= 1911 in tennis =

This page covers all the important events in the sport of tennis in 1911. It provides the results of notable tournaments throughout the year on both the men's and women's ILTF tennis circuits.

== Australian Open ==
Category	Champion(s)	Finalist(s)	Score
Singles	(Australia) Norman Brookes	(Australia) Horace Rice	6–1, 6–2, 6–3
Doubles	(Australia) Rodney Heath (United Kingdom of Great Britain and Ireland) Randolph Lycett	(Australia) John Addison (Australia) Norman Brookes	6–2, 7–5, 6–0

== French Open ==
Not a Grand Slam event.

== Wimbledon ==
Category	Champion(s)	Finalist(s)	Score
Men's singles	(New Zealand) Anthony Wilding	(United Kingdom of Great Britain and Ireland) Herbert Roper Barrett	6–4, 4–6, 2–6, 6–2 retired
Women's singles	(United Kingdom of Great Britain and Ireland) Dorothea Lambert Chambers	(United Kingdom of Great Britain and Ireland) Dora Boothby	6–0, 6–0
Men's doubles	(France) Max Decugis (France) André Gobert	(United Kingdom of Great Britain and Ireland) Major Ritchie (New Zealand) Anthony Wilding	9–7, 5–7, 6–3, 2–6, 6–2

== US Open ==
Category	Champion(s)	Finalist(s)	Score
Men's singles	(United States) William Larned	(United States) Maurice McLoughlin	6–4, 6–4, 6–2
Women's singles	(United States) Hazel Hotchkiss	(United States) Florence Sutton	8–10, 6–1, 9–7
Men's doubles	(United States) Raymond Little (United States) Gustav Touchard	(United States) Fred Alexander (United States) Harold Hackett	7–5, 13–15, 6–2, 6–4
Women's doubles	(United States) Hazel Hotchkiss (United States) Eleonora Sears	(United States) Dorothy Green (United States) Florence Sutton	6–4, 4–6, 6–2
Mixed doubles	(United States) Hazel Hotchkiss (United States) Wallace F. Johnson	(United States) Edna Wildey (United States) Herbert M. Tilden	6–4, 6–4
