= List of US Open mixed doubles champions =

US Open Mixed Doubles Champions
- Location: Flushing Meadows, Queens; New York City; United States
- Venue: USTA Billie Jean King National Tennis Center
- Governing body: USTA
- Created: 1887; 139 years ago
- Editions: 138 events (2026); 58 events (Open Era)
- Surface: Grass (1887–1974); Clay (Note: Played on HarTru surface.) (1975–1977); Hard (Note: Played on DecoTurf surface.) (1978–present)
- Prize money: Total: US$65,000,000 (2023); Winner: US$170,000 (2023)
- Trophy: US Open Trophy
- Website: Official website

Most titles
- Amateur era: 9: Margaret Osborne duPont
- Open era: 4: Marty Riessen; 4: Bob Bryan

Current champion
- Karolína Muchová; Jakub Menšík

The following pairings won the U.S. Open tennis championship in mixed doubles.

== 2025 format change ==
In 2025 there was a big format change. The tournament took place over two days with the Final being played before day one of the US Open. The matches were being played in best-of-three-sets with short sets to four games, no-ad scoring, tiebreakers at four-all, and a 10-point match tiebreak in lieu of a third set. The final was a best-of-three set match to six games, featuring no-ad scoring, with tiebreakers at six-all with a 10-point match tiebreaker in lieu of a third set.

== Finals ==
=== U.S. National Championships ===
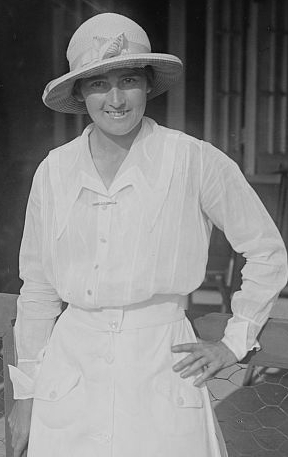
American Mary Browne won four mixed doubles titles

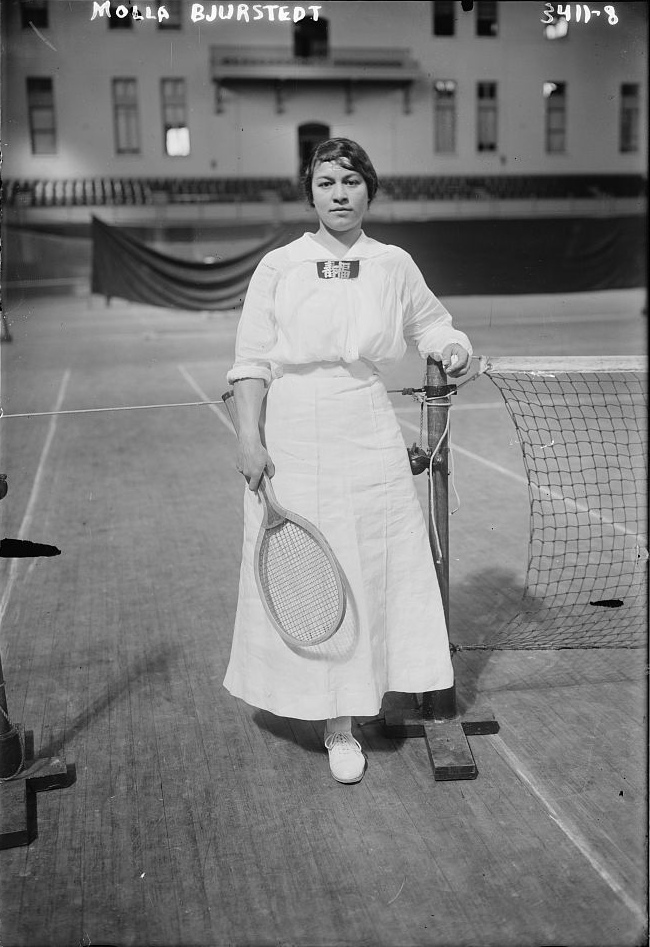
Molla Bjurstedt Mallory participated in eight mixed doubles finals and won three titles

Key
† Unofficial event that did not carry championship status.

Year	Champions	Runners-up	Score
1887	(United States) L. Stokes (United States) Joseph Clark †	(United States) Laura Knight (United States) E. D. Faries	7–5, 6–4
1888	(United States) Marian Wright (United States) Joseph Clark †	(United States) Adeline Robinson (United States) P. Johnson	1–6, 6–5, 6–4, 6–3
1889	(United States) Grace Roosevelt (United States) A. E. Wright †	(United States) Bertha Townsend (United States) C. T. Lee	6–1, 6–3, 3–6, 6–3
1890	(United Kingdom) Mabel Cahill (United States) Rodmond Beach †	(United States) Bertha Townsend (United States) C. T. Lee	6–2, 3–6, 6–2
1891	(United Kingdom) Mabel Cahill (United States) M. R. Wright †	(United States) Grace Roosevelt (United States) C. T. Lee	6–4, 6–0, 7–5
1892	(United Kingdom) Mabel Cahill (United States) Clarence Hobart	(United States) Elisabeth Moore (United States) Rodmond Beach	6–1, 6–3
1893	(United States) Ellen Roosevelt (United States) Clarence Hobart	(United States) Ethel Bankson (United States) Robert N. Willson, Jr.	6–1, 4–6, 10–6
1894	(United States) Juliette Atkinson (United States) Edwin Fischer	(United States) Mrs. McFadden (United States) Gustav Remak, Jr.	6–3, 6–2, 6–1
1895	(United States) Juliette Atkinson (United States) Edwin Fischer	(United States) Amy Williams (United States) Mantle Fielding	4–6, 8–6, 6–2
1896	(United States) Juliette Atkinson (United States) Edwin Fischer	(United States) Amy Williams (United States) Mantle Fielding	6–2, 6–3, 6–3
1897	(United States) Laura Henson (United States) D. L. Magruder	(United States) Maud Banks (United States) R. A. Griffin	6–4, 6–3, 7–5
1898	(United States) Carrie Neely (United States) Edwin Fischer	(United States) Helen Chapman (United States) J. A. Hill	6–2, 6–4, 8–6
1899	(United States) Elizabeth Rastall (United States) Albert L. Hoskins	(United States) Jane Craven (United States) James P. Gardner	6–4, 6–0, def.
1900	(United States) Margaret Hunnewell (United States) Alfred Codman	(United States) T. Shaw (United States) George Atkinson	11–9, 6–3, 6–1
1901	(United States) Marion Jones (United States) Raymond Little	(United States) Myrtle McAteer (United States) Dr. Clyde Stevens	6–4, 6–4, 7–5
1902	(United States) Elisabeth Moore (United States) Wylie Grant	(United States) Elizabeth Rastall (United States) Albert L. Hoskins	6–2, 6–1
1903	(United States) Helen Chapman (United States) Harry F. Allen	(United States) Carrie Neely (United States) W. H. Rowland	6–4, 7–5
1904	(United States) Elisabeth Moore (United States) Wylie Grant	(United States) May Sutton (United States) F. B. Dallas	6–2, 6–1
1905	(United States) Augusta Schultz Hobart (United States) Clarence Hobart	(United States) Elisabeth Moore (Australia) Edward Dewhurst	6–2, 6–4
1906	(United States) Sarah Coffin (Australia) Edward Dewhurst	(United States) Margaret Johnson (United States) J. B. Johnson	6–3, 7–5
1907	(United States) May Sayers (United States) Wallace F. Johnson	(United States) Natalie Wildey (United States) Herbert M. Tilden	6–1, 7–5
1908	(United States) Nathaniel Niles (United States) Edith Rotch	(United States) Raymond Little (United States) Louise Hammond	6–4, 4–6, 6–4
1909	(United States) Hazel Hotchkiss Wightman (United States) Wallace F. Johnson	(United States) Raymond Little (United States) Louise Hammond	6–2, 6–0
1910	(United States) Hazel Hotchkiss Wightman (United States) Joseph R. Carpenter, Jr.	(United States) Herbert M. Tilden (United States) Edna Wildey	6–2, 6–2
1911	(United States) Hazel Hotchkiss Wightman (United States) Wallace F. Johnson	(United States) Herbert M. Tilden (United States) Edna Wildey	6–4, 6–4
1912	(United States) Mary K. Browne (United States) R. Norris Williams	(United States) William Clothier (United States) Eleonora Sears	6–4, 2–6, 11–9
1913	(United States) Mary K. Browne (United States) Bill Tilden	(United Kingdom) C. S. Rogers (United States) Dorothy Green	7–5, 7–5
1914	(United States) Mary K. Browne (United States) Bill Tilden	(United States) J. R. Rowland (United States) Margaretta Myers	6–1, 6–4
1915	(United States) Hazel Hotchkiss Wightman (United States) Harry C. Johnson	(United States) Irving Wright (Norway) Molla Bjurstedt Mallory	6–0, 6–1
1916	(United States) Eleonora Sears (United States) Willis E. Davis	(United States) Florence Ballin (United States) Bill Tilden	6–4, 7–5
1917	(Norway) Molla Bjurstedt Mallory (United States) Irving Wright	(United States) Florence Ballin (United States) Bill Tilden	10–12, 6–1, 6–3
1918	(United States) Hazel Hotchkiss Wightman (United States) Irving Wright	(Norway) Molla Bjurstedt Mallory (United States) Fred Alexander	6–2, 6–3
1919	(United States) Marion Zinderstein (United States) Vincent Richards	(United States) Florence Ballin (United States) Bill Tilden	2–6, 11–9, 6–2
1920	(United States) Hazel Hotchkiss Wightman (United States) Wallace F. Johnson	(United States) Molla Bjurstedt Mallory (United States) Craig Biddle	6–4, 6–3
1921	(United States) Mary K. Browne (United States) Bill Johnston	(United States) Molla Bjurstedt Mallory (United States) Bill Tilden	3–6, 6–4, 6–3
1922	(United States) Molla Bjurstedt Mallory (United States) Bill Tilden	(United States) Howard Kinsey (United States) Helen Wills	6–4, 6–3
1923	(United States) Molla Bjurstedt Mallory (United States) Bill Tilden	(Australia) John B. Hawkes (United Kingdom) Kitty McKane Godfree	6–3, 2–6, 10–8
1924	(United States) Helen Wills (United States) Vincent Richards	(United States) Molla Bjurstedt Mallory (United States) Bill Tilden	6–8, 7–5, 6–0
1925	(United Kingdom) Kitty McKane Godfree (Australia) John B. Hawkes	(United States) Vincent Richards (United Kingdom) Ermyntrude Harvey	6–2, 6–4
1926	(United States) Elizabeth Ryan (France) Jean Borotra	(France) René Lacoste (United States) Hazel Hotchkiss Wightman	6–4, 7–5
1927	(United Kingdom) Eileen Bennett Whittingstall (France) Henri Cochet	(France) René Lacoste (United States) Hazel Hotchkiss Wightman	6–2, 6–0, 6–3
1928	(United States) Helen Wills (Australia) John B. Hawkes	(Australia) Edgar Moon (United Kingdom) Edith Cross	6–1, 6–3
1929	(United Kingdom) Betty Nuthall (United States) George Lott	(United Kingdom) Henry W. Austin (United Kingdom) Phyllis Covell	6–3, 6–3
1930	(United States) Edith Cross (United States) Wilmer Allison	(United States) Frank Shields (United States) Marjorie Morrill	6–4, 6–4
1931	(United Kingdom) Betty Nuthall (United States) George Lott	(United States) Wilmer Allison (United States) Anna McCune Harper	6–3, 6–3
1932	(United States) Sarah Palfrey Cooke (United Kingdom) Fred Perry	(United States) Ellsworth Vines (United States) Helen Jacobs	6–3, 7–5
1933	(United States) Elizabeth Ryan (United States) Ellsworth Vines	(United States) Sarah Palfrey Cooke (United States) George Lott	11–9, 6–1
1934	(United States) Helen Jacobs (United States) George Lott	(United States) Elizabeth Ryan (United States) Lester Stoefen	4–6, 13–11, 6–2
1935	(United States) Sarah Palfrey Cooke (Spain) Enrique Maier	(United Kingdom) Kay Stammers (Czechoslovakia) Roderich Menzel	6–4, 4–6, 6–3
1936	(United States) Alice Marble (United States) Gene Mako	(United States) Sarah Palfrey Cooke (United States) Don Budge	6–3, 6–2
1937	(United States) Sarah Palfrey Cooke (United States) Don Budge	(France) Sylvie Henrotin (France) Yvon Petra	6–2, 8–10, 6–0
1938	(United States) Alice Marble (United States) Don Budge	(Australia) Thelma Coyne Long (Australia) John Bromwich	6–1, 6–2
1939	(United States) Alice Marble (Australia) Harry Hopman	(United States) Sarah Palfrey Cooke (United States) Elwood Cooke	9–7, 6–1
1940	(United States) Alice Marble (United States) Bobby Riggs	(United States) Dorothy Bundy Cheney (United States) Jack Kramer	9–7, 6–1
1941	(United States) Sarah Palfrey Cooke (United States) Jack Kramer	(United States) Pauline Betz (United States) Bobby Riggs	4–6, 6–4, 6–4
1942	(United States) Louise Brough (United States) Ted Schroeder	(Argentina) Alejo Russell (United States) Patricia Todd	3–6, 6–1, 6–4
1943	(United States) Margaret Osborne (United States) Bill Talbert	(Ecuador) Pancho Segura (United States) Pauline Betz	10–6, 6–4
1944	(United States) Margaret Osborne (United States) Bill Talbert	(United States) Donald McNeill (United States) Dorothy Bundy	6–2, 6–3
1945	(United States) Margaret Osborne (United States) Bill Talbert	(United States) Bob Falkenburg (United States) Doris Hart	6–4, 6–4
1946	(United States) Margaret Osborne (United States) Bill Talbert	(United States) Robert Kimbrell (United States) Louise Brough	6–3, 6–4
1947	(United States) Louise Brough (Australia) John Bromwich	(Ecuador) Pancho Segura (United States) Gussie Moran	6–3, 6–1
1948	(United States) Louise Brough (United States) Tom Brown	(United States) Bill Talbert (United States) Margaret Osborne duPont	6–4, 6–4
1949	(United States) Louise Brough (South Africa) Eric Sturgess	(United States) Bill Talbert (United States) Margaret Osborne duPont	4–6, 6–3, 7–5
1950	(United States) Margaret Osborne duPont (Australia) Ken McGregor	(United States) Doris Hart (Australia) Frank Sedgman	6–4, 3–6, 6–3
1951	(United States) Doris Hart (Australia) Frank Sedgman	(United States) Shirley Fry (Australia) Mervyn Rose	6–3, 6–2
1952	(United States) Doris Hart (Australia) Frank Sedgman	(Australia) Thelma Long (Australia) Lew Hoad	6–3, 7–5
1953	(United States) Doris Hart (United States) Vic Seixas	(United States) Julia Ann Sampson (Australia) Rex Hartwig	6–2, 4–6, 6–4
1954	(United States) Doris Hart (United States) Vic Seixas	(United States) Margaret Osborne duPont (Australia) Ken Rosewall	4–6, 6–1, 6–1
1955	(United States) Doris Hart (United States) Vic Seixas	(United States) Shirley Fry (United States) Gardnar Mulloy	7–5, 5–7, 6–2
1956	(United States) Margaret Osborne duPont (Australia) Ken Rosewall	(United States) Darlene Hard (Australia) Lew Hoad	9–7, 6–1
1957	(United States) Althea Gibson (Denmark) Kurt Nielsen	(United States) Darlene Hard (Australia) Bob Howe	6–3, 9–7
1958	(United States) Margaret Osborne duPont (Australia) Neale Fraser	(Brazil) Maria Bueno (United States) Alex Olmedo	6–3, 3–6, 9–7
1959	(United States) Margaret Osborne duPont (Australia) Neale Fraser	(Australia) Bob Mark (United States) Janet Hopps	7–5, 13–15, 6–2
1960	(United States) Margaret Osborne duPont (Australia) Neale Fraser	(Mexico) Antonio Palafox (Brazil) Maria Bueno	6–3, 6–2
1961	(Australia) Margaret Smith (Australia) Bob Mark	(United States) Dennis Ralston (United States) Darlene Hard	def.
1962	(Australia) Margaret Smith (Australia) Fred Stolle	(United States) Frank Froehling (Australia) Lesley Turner Bowrey	7–5, 6–2
1963	(Australia) Margaret Smith (Australia) Ken Fletcher	(United States) Ed Rubinoff (Australia) Judy Tegart	3–6, 8–6, 6–2
1964	(Australia) Margaret Smith (Australia) John Newcombe	(United States) Ed Rubinoff (Australia) Judy Tegart	10–6, 4–6, 6–3
1965	(Australia) Margaret Court (Australia) Fred Stolle	(United States) Frank Froehling (Australia) Judy Tegart	6–2, 6–2
1966	(United States) Donna Floyd Fales (Australia) Owen Davidson	(United States) Ed Rubinoff (United States) Carol Aucamp	6–1, 6–3
1967	(United States) Billie Jean King (Australia) Owen Davidson	(United States) Rosemary Casals (United States) Stan Smith	6–3, 6–2

=== US Open ===
Year	Champions	Runners-up	Score
1968 (Note: The mixed doubles event was not part of the 1968 US Open. Result listed is of the 1968 U.S. Amateur Championships held at the Longwood Cricket Club near Boston in August of that year.)	(United States) Mary-Ann Eisel (United Kingdom) Peter Curtis	(United States) Tory Fretz (United States) Gerry Perry	6–4, 7–5
1969	(Australia) Margaret Court (United States) Marty Riessen	(France) Françoise Dürr (United States) Dennis Ralston	6–4, 7–5
1970	(Australia) Margaret Court (United States) Marty Riessen	(Australia) Judy Tegart Dalton (South Africa) Frew McMillan	6–4, 6–4
1971	(United States) Billie Jean King (Australia) Owen Davidson	(Netherlands) Betty Stöve (South Africa) Bob Maud	6–3, 7–5
1972	(Australia) Margaret Court (United States) Marty Riessen	(United States) Rosemary Casals (Romania) Ilie Năstase	6–3, 7–5
1973	(United States) Billie Jean King (Australia) Owen Davidson	(Australia) Margaret Court (United States) Marty Riessen	6–3, 3–6, 7–6
1974	(United States) Pam Teeguarden (Australia) Geoff Masters	(United States) Chris Evert (United States) Jimmy Connors	6–1, 7–6
1975	(United States) Rosemary Casals (United States) Dick Stockton	(United States) Billie Jean King (Australia) Fred Stolle	6‐3, 6‐7, 6‐3
1976	(United States) Billie Jean King (Australia) Phil Dent	(Netherlands) Betty Stöve (South Africa) Frew McMillan	3–6, 6–2, 7–5
1977	(Netherlands) Betty Stöve (South Africa) Frew McMillan	(United States) Billie Jean King (United States) Vitas Gerulaitis	6–2, 3–6, 6–3
1978	(Netherlands) Betty Stöve (South Africa) Frew McMillan	(United States) Billie Jean King (Australia) Ray Ruffels	6–3, 7–6
1979	(South Africa) Greer Stevens (South Africa) Bob Hewitt	(Netherlands) Betty Stöve (South Africa) Frew McMillan	6–3, 7–5
1980	(Australia) Wendy Turnbull (United States) Marty Riessen	(Netherlands) Betty Stöve (South Africa) Frew McMillan	7–5, 6–2
1981	(United States) Anne Smith (South Africa) Kevin Curren	(United States) JoAnne Russell (United States) Steve Denton	6–4, 7–6
1982	(United States) Anne Smith (South Africa) Kevin Curren	(United States) Barbara Potter (United States) Ferdi Taygan	6–7, 7–6, 7–6
1983	(Australia) Elizabeth Sayers Smylie (Australia) John Fitzgerald	(United States) Barbara Potter (United States) Ferdi Taygan	3–6, 6–3, 6–4
1984	(Bulgaria) Manuela Maleeva (United States) Tom Gullikson	(Australia) Elizabeth Sayers Smylie (Australia) John Fitzgerald	2–6, 7–5, 6–4
1985	(United States) Martina Navratilova (Switzerland) Heinz Günthardt	(Australia) Elizabeth Sayers Smylie (Australia) John Fitzgerald	6–3, 6–4
1986	(Italy) Raffaella Reggi (Spain) Sergio Casal	(United States) Martina Navratilova (United States) Peter Fleming	6–4, 6–4
1987	(United States) Martina Navratilova (Spain) Emilio Sánchez Vicario	(United States) Betsy Nagelsen (United States) Paul Annacone	6–4, 6–7, 7–6
1988	(Czechoslovakia) Jana Novotná (United States) Jim Pugh	(Australia) Elizabeth Sayers Smylie (United States) Patrick McEnroe	7–5, 6–3
1989	(United States) Robin White (United States) Shelby Cannon	(United States) Meredith McGrath (United States) Rick Leach	3–6, 6–2, 7–5
1990	(Australia) Elizabeth Sayers Smylie (Australia) Todd Woodbridge	(Soviet Union) Natalia Zvereva (United States) Jim Pugh	6–4, 6–2
1991	(Netherlands) Manon Bollegraf (Netherlands) Tom Nijssen	(Spain) Arantxa Sánchez Vicario (Spain) Emilio Sánchez Vicario	6–2, 7–6
1992	(Australia) Nicole Provis (Australia) Mark Woodforde	(Czechoslovakia) Helena Suková (Netherlands) Tom Nijssen	4–6, 6–3, 6–3
1993	(Czech Republic) Helena Suková (Australia) Todd Woodbridge	(United States) Martina Navratilova (Australia) Mark Woodforde	6–3, 7–6
1994	(South Africa) Elna Reinach (United States) Patrick Galbraith	(Czech Republic) Jana Novotná (Australia) Todd Woodbridge	6–2, 6–4
1995	(United States) Meredith McGrath (United States) Matt Lucena	(United States) Gigi Fernández (Czech Republic) Cyril Suk	6–4, 6–4
1996	(United States) Lisa Raymond (United States) Patrick Galbraith	(Netherlands) Manon Bollegraf (United States) Rick Leach	7–6, 7–6
1997	(Netherlands) Manon Bollegraf (United States) Rick Leach	(Argentina) Mercedes Paz (Argentina) Pablo Albano	3–6, 7–5, 7–6^{(7–3)}
1998	(United States) Serena Williams (Belarus) Max Mirnyi	(United States) Lisa Raymond (United States) Patrick Galbraith	6–2, 6–2
1999	(Japan) Ai Sugiyama (India) Mahesh Bhupathi	(United States) Kimberly Po (United States) Donald Johnson	6–4, 6–4
2000	(Spain) Arantxa Sánchez Vicario (United States) Jared Palmer	(Russia) Anna Kournikova (Belarus) Max Mirnyi	6–4, 6–3
2001	(Australia) Rennae Stubbs (Australia) Todd Woodbridge	(United States) Lisa Raymond (India) Leander Paes	6–4, 5–7, 7–6
2002	(United States) Lisa Raymond (United States) Mike Bryan	(Slovenia) Katarina Srebotnik (United States) Bob Bryan	7–6, 7–6
2003	(Slovenia) Katarina Srebotnik (United States) Bob Bryan	(Russia) Lina Krasnoroutskaya (Canada) Daniel Nestor	5–7, 7–5, [10–5]
2004	(Russia) Vera Zvonareva (United States) Bob Bryan	(Australia) Alicia Molik (Australia) Todd Woodbridge	6–3, 6–4
2005	(Slovakia) Daniela Hantuchová (India) Mahesh Bhupathi	(Slovenia) Katarina Srebotnik (Serbia and Montenegro) Nenad Zimonjić	6–4, 6–2
2006	(United States) Martina Navratilova (United States) Bob Bryan	(Czech Republic) Květa Peschke (Czech Republic) Martin Damm	6–2, 6–3
2007	(Belarus) Victoria Azarenka (Belarus) Max Mirnyi	(United States) Meghann Shaughnessy (India) Leander Paes	6–4, 7–6^{(8–6)}
2008	(Zimbabwe) Cara Black (India) Leander Paes	(United States) Liezel Huber (United Kingdom) Jamie Murray	7–6^{(8–6)}, 6–4
2009	(United States) Carly Gullickson (United States) Travis Parrot	(Zimbabwe) Cara Black (India) Leander Paes	6–2, 6–4
2010	(United States) Liezel Huber (United States) Bob Bryan	(Czech Republic) Květa Peschke (Pakistan) Aisam-ul-Haq Qureshi	6–4, 6–4
2011	(United States) Melanie Oudin (United States) Jack Sock	(Argentina) Gisela Dulko (Argentina) Eduardo Schwank	7–6, 4–6, [10–8]
2012	(Russia) Ekaterina Makarova (Brazil) Bruno Soares	(Czech Republic) Květa Peschke (Poland) Marcin Matkowski	6–7, 6–1, [12–10]
2013	(Czech Republic) Andrea Hlaváčková (Belarus) Max Mirnyi	(United States) Abigail Spears (Mexico) Santiago González	7–6^{(7–5)}, 6–3
2014	(India) Sania Mirza (Brazil) Bruno Soares	(United States) Abigail Spears (Mexico) Santiago González	6–1, 2–6, [11–9]
2015	(Switzerland) Martina Hingis (India) Leander Paes	(United States) Bethanie Mattek-Sands (United States) Sam Querrey	6–4, 3–6, [10–7]
2016	(Germany) Laura Siegemund (Croatia) Mate Pavić	(United States) Coco Vandeweghe (United States) Rajeev Ram	6–4, 6–4
2017	(Switzerland) Martina Hingis (United Kingdom) Jamie Murray	(Chinese Taipei) Chan Hao-ching (New Zealand) Michael Venus	6–1, 4–6, [10–8]
2018	(United States) Bethanie Mattek-Sands (United Kingdom) Jamie Murray	(Poland) Alicja Rosolska (Croatia) Nikola Mektić	2–6, 6–3, [11–9]
2019	(United States) Bethanie Mattek-Sands (United Kingdom) Jamie Murray	(Chinese Taipei) Chan Hao-ching (New Zealand) Michael Venus	6–2, 6–3
2020	No competition due to the COVID-19 pandemic		
2021	(United States) Desirae Krawczyk (United Kingdom) Joe Salisbury	(Mexico) Giuliana Olmos (El Salvador) Marcelo Arévalo	7–5, 6–2
2022	(Australia) Storm Sanders (Australia) John Peers	(Belgium) Kirsten Flipkens (France) Édouard Roger-Vasselin	4–6, 6–4, [10–7]
2023	(Kazakhstan) Anna Danilina (Finland) Harri Heliövaara	(United States) Jessica Pegula (United States) Austin Krajicek	6–3, 6–4
2024	(Italy) Sara Errani (Italy) Andrea Vavassori	(United States) Taylor Townsend (United States) Donald Young	7–6^{(7–0)}, 7–5
2025	(Italy) Sara Errani (Italy) Andrea Vavassori	(Poland) Iga Świątek (Norway) Casper Ruud	6–3, 5–7, [10–6]
2026	(Czech Republic) Karolína Muchová (Czech Republic) Jakub Menšík	(Switzerland) Belinda Bencic (Italy) Flavio Cobolli	6–3, 1–6, [10–6]

== See also ==
U.S. Open other competitions

- List of US Open men's singles champions
- List of US Open men's doubles champions
- List of US Open women's singles champions
- List of US Open women's doubles champions

Grand Slam mixed doubles

- List of Australian Open mixed doubles champions
- List of French Open mixed doubles champions
- List of Wimbledon mixed doubles champions
- List of Grand Slam mixed doubles champions
