= 1909 U.S. National Championships – Women's singles =

Women's singles
- 1909 U.S. National Championships

Final
- Champion: (United States) Hazel Hotchkiss
- Runner-up: (United States) Maud Barger-Wallach
- Score: 6–0, 6–1

Details
- Draw: 32
- Seeds: –

Events
Singles	men	women
Doubles	men	women
← 1908 ·	U.S. National Championships	· 1910 →

Hazel Hotchkiss won the singles tennis title of the 1909 U.S. Women's National Singles Championship by defeating reigning champion Maud Barger-Wallach 6–0, 6–1 in the challenge round. Hotchkiss had won the right to challenge Barger-Wallach by defeating Louise Hammond 6–8, 6–1, 6–4 in the final of the All Comers' competition. The event was played on outdoor grass courts and held at the Philadelphia Cricket Club in Wissahickon Heights, Chestnut Hill, Philadelphia from June 21 through June 27, 1909.

== Draw ==
=== Challenge round ===
Challenge Round
(United States) Maud Barger-Wallach	0	1
(United States) Hazel Hotchkiss	6	6

=== All Comers' finals ===
Quarterfinals
(United States) Emily Scott	3	0
(United States) Hazel Hotchkiss	6	6
(United States) Edith Rotch	6	6
(United States) Alice Day	1	0
(Canada) Lois Moyes	6	8
(United States) Margaret Roberts	1	6
(United States) Gwendolyn Rees	4	1
(United States) Louise Hammond	6	6

Semifinals
(United States) Hazel Hotchkiss	6	7
(United States) Edith Rotch	2	5
(Canada) Lois Moyes	0	2
(United States) Louise Hammond	6	6

Finals
(United States) Hazel Hotchkiss	6	6	6
(United States) Louise Hammond	8	1	4

Preceded by 1909 Wimbledon Championships – Women's singles	Grand Slam women's singles	Succeeded by 1910 Wimbledon Championships – Women's singles
