= 1909 U.S. National Championships (tennis) =

- Date: August 17–27 (M); June 21–27 (W)
- Edition: 29th
- Category: Grand Slam
- Surface: Grass
- Location: Newport, R.I., United States (M); Philadelphia, PA, United States (W)

Champions

Men's singles
- (United States) William Larned

Women's singles
- (United States) Hazel Hotchkiss

Men's doubles
- (United States) Fred Alexander / (United States) Harold Hackett

Women's doubles
- (United States) Hazel Hotchkiss / (United States) Edith Rotch

Mixed doubles
- (United States) Hazel Hotchkiss / (United States) Wallace F. Johnson
- U.S. National Championships

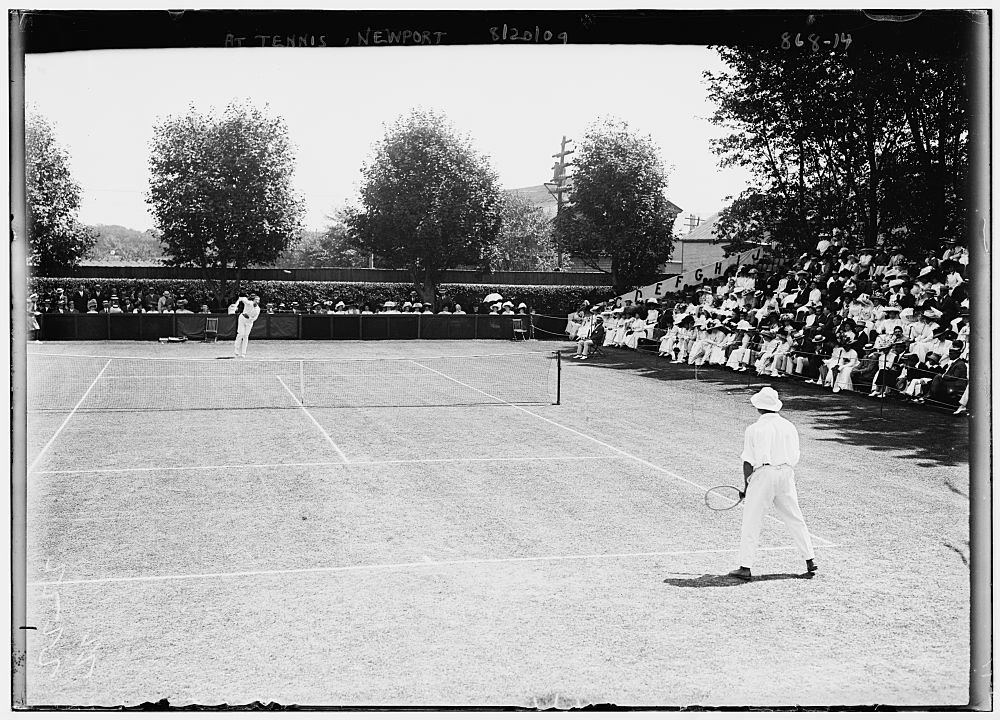
Tennis players on Newport Casino Court (August 20, 1909)

The 1909 U.S. National Championships tennis tournament (now known as the US Open) was a tennis tournament that took place in June and August of 1909.

The women's tournament was held from June 21 to June 27 on the outdoor grass courts at the Philadelphia Cricket Club in Philadelphia, Pennsylvania. The men's tournament was held from August 17 to August 27 on the outdoor grass courts at the Newport Casino in Newport, Rhode Island. It was the 29th U.S. National Championships and the second Grand Slam tournament of the three played that year.

== Finals ==
=== Men's singles ===
(United States) William Larned (USA) defeated (United States) William Clothier (USA) 6–1, 6–2, 5–7, 1–6, 6–1

=== Women's singles ===
(United States) Hazel Hotchkiss (USA) defeated (United States) Maud Barger-Wallach (USA) 6–0, 6–1

=== Men's doubles ===
(United States) Fred Alexander (USA) / (United States) Harold Hackett (USA) defeated (United States) Maurice McLoughlin (USA) / (United States) George Janes (USA) 6–4, 6–4, 6–0

=== Women's doubles ===
(United States) Hazel Hotchkiss (USA) / (United States) Edith Rotch (USA) defeated (United States) Dorothy Green (USA) / (Canada) Lois Moyes (CAN) 6–1, 6–1

=== Mixed doubles ===
(United States) Hazel Hotchkiss (USA) / (United States) Wallace F. Johnson (USA) defeated (United States) Louise Hammond Raymond (USA) / (United States) Raymond Little (USA) 6–2, 6–0

Preceded by 1909 Wimbledon Championships	Grand Slams	Succeeded by 1909 Australasian Championships
