= George W. Wightman =

American sports official (1890–1963)

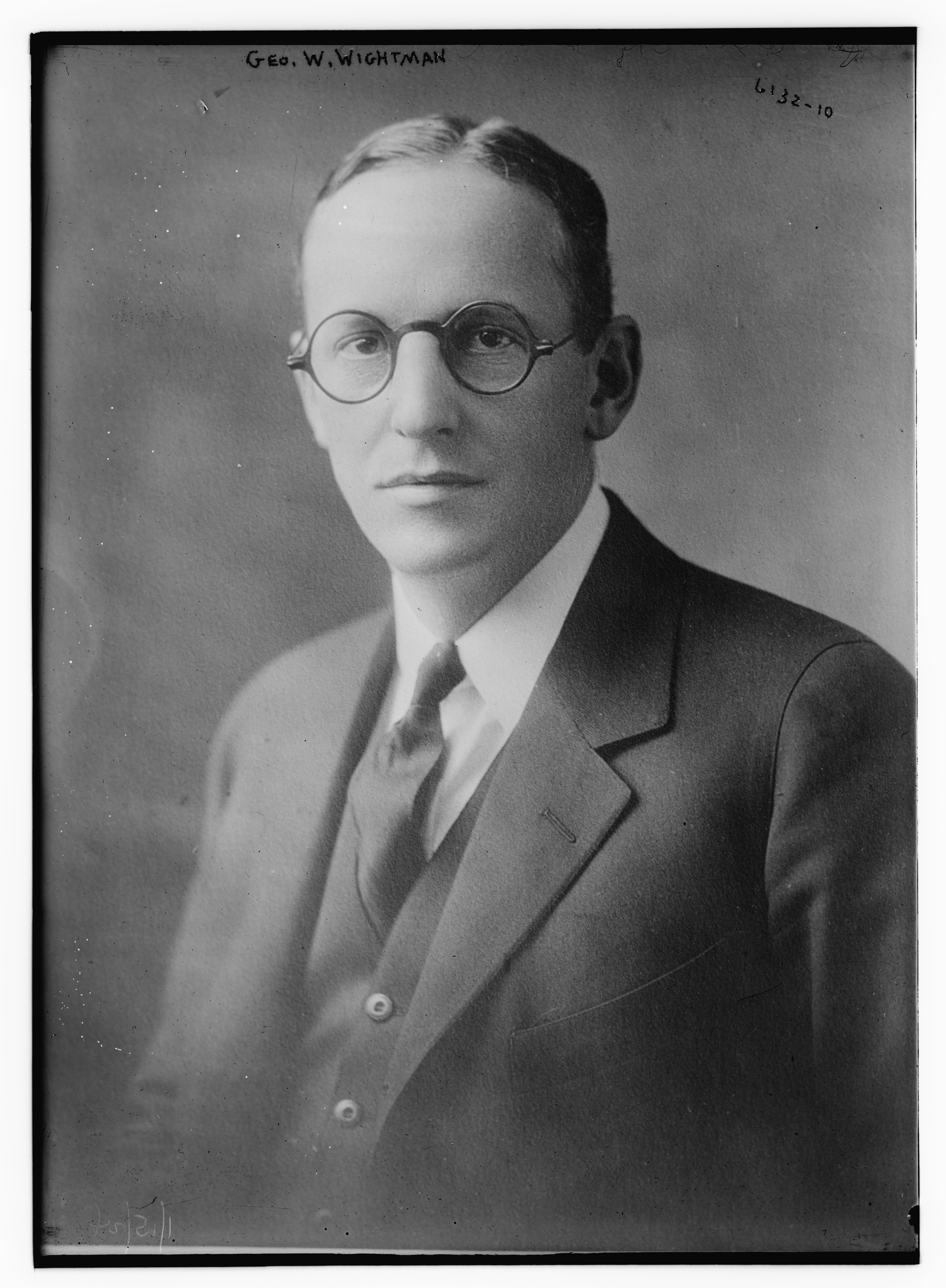
- Born: December 17, 1890; Boston, Massachusetts
- Died: May 25, 1963 (aged 72); Boston, Massachusetts
- Known for: President of the United States Lawn Tennis Association and the Boston Athletic Association; Husband of Hazel Hotchkiss Wightman
- Spouses: Hazel Hotchkiss (m. 1912; div. 1940); Eleanor McPeake (m. 1940; death 1963)
- Children: 6

George William Wightman (December 17, 1890 – May 25, 1963) was an American sports official who was president of the United States Lawn Tennis Association and the Boston Athletic Association. He was the husband of tennis champion Hazel Hotchkiss Wightman.

== Early life ==
Wightman was born in Boston on December 17, 1890, to George Henry Wightman and Flora Ellis (Arnold) Wightman. His father was an associate of Andrew Carnegie and a pioneer of amateur tennis. Wightman prepared for college at the Noble and Greenough School, where he was a was captain of the baseball team. He graduated from Harvard College in 1912 and Harvard Law School in 1915. In 1914, he won the school's tennis championship. He was also a noted yachtsman was a finalist in the 1917 national court tennis championship.

Wightman was admitted the bar in 1915 and in 1919 was made a partner in Hale and Dorr.

== Personal life ==
In 1912, Wightman married U.S. National Tennis Champion Hazel Hotchkiss. They had five children. The couple divorced in 1940 and Wightman married Eleanor McPeake. They had one daughter.

== United States Lawn Tennis Association ==
Wightman was elected treasurer of the United States Lawn Tennis Association in 1917, but resigned the following year after he entered into active military service. He was elected secretary of the organization after the war, but stepped down in 1921 due to business obligations. He was elected vice president of the organization in 1923 was, for all practical purposes, the head of the organization after president Dwight F. Davis became United States Assistant Secretary of War. The following year, he succeeded Davis as president. Shortly after his election, the USLTA passed a player-writer rule that prevented players from receiving monetary compensation for writing articles on tennis tournaments they were competing in. The rule caused Vincent Richards and world's number 1 ranked player Bill Tilden to quit the Davis Cup team. Wightman, who wanted to keep tennis an amateur sport, supported the rule, writing that "our amateur rule provides that "a person shall cease to be an amateur – by pursuing, or assisting in the pursuit of tennis – as a means of livelihood or for gain or any emolument." Your president believes that the player-writer interpretation of the foregoing provision is entirely sound, and furthermore that it is absolutely necessary if the game of tennis is to continue an amateur sport". He did not run for reelection in 1925 due to business considerations.

== Boston Athletic Association ==
Wightman also held leadership positions with the Boston Athletic Association. In 1925, Wightman, then the club's vice president, issued a statement deploring the rough tactics the B.A.A governing committee believed Fort Pitt Hornet players were allowed to employ in a game where B.A.A hockey player Leo Hughes lost an eye. In 1926, Wightman succeeded Henry G. Lapham as president of the B.A.A. He remained in this position until April 1928.

== American Olympic Committee ==
In 1927, Wightman succeeded Lapham as third vice president of the American Olympic Committee. He served as chairman of the New England fundraising committee and was in charge of preparations for the 1928 United States Olympic track and field trials, which were held at Harvard Stadium. He resigned from the Olympic Committee on July 10, 1928, in protest of the decision to allow Charley Paddock, whose amateur status was questioned, to compete for a place on the Olympic team.

== Death ==
Wightman died on May 26, 1963, at Massachusetts General Hospital. He was survived by his six children.
