= New York Tennis Club Open =

New York Tennis Club open

Defunct tennis tournament
- Founded: 1886; 140 years ago
- Location: 1. 147th St. and Nicholas Ave, Manhattan; 2. 123rd St. and Nicholas Ave, Manhattan; 3. Columbia Oval on Gun Hill Rd, Bronx; 4. 238th and Broadway, Bronx; 5. 3081 Harding Ave, Bronx
- Surface: Clay

The New York Lawn Tennis Club was founded in 1886. Its first annual open tournament was held from September to October, 1886. It was played on dirt courts at 147th St. and Nicholas Ave. in Manhattan (Washington Heights section). Their quarters were demolished to make way for new construction in 1898. The club's courts ceremoniously opened at 123rd St. and Nicholas Ave. in 1901. The tournament games were played at the Columbia Oval from 1912 to 1917. The club moved out of Manhattan to 238th and Broadway in the Bronx, 1918. It actually took over and restored the former house and courts of the West Side Tennis Club. Its fourth and final move was to the Throggs Neck section of the Bronx in 1928.

== Finals ==
=== Men's singles ===
(Incomplete roll)

Year	Champions	Runners-up	Score
1886	(United States) Oliver Campbell	(United States) P. B. Ruggles	6–4, 6–3, 6–4
1887	(United States) Clarence Hobart	(United States) P. B. Ruggles	6–2, 6–1, 6–2
1888	(United States) Edward MacMullen	(United States) Clarence Hobart	7–5, 4–6, 6–2, 6–3
1889	(United States) A. W. Post	(United States) Edward L. Hall	6–3, 6–1, 6–3
1890	(United Kingdom) Charles Eames	(United States) Carman Runyon	6–3, 6–2, 6–1
1890	(United States) Arthur Runyon	(United States) Stephen Millett	2–6, 6–3, 6–2
1893	(United States) Gordon Parker	(United States) Stephen Millett	1–6, 6–4, 7–5, 5–7, 6–4
1895	(United States) Clarence Hobart (2)	(United States) Leo Ware	6–3, 3–6, 6–3, 6–2
1897	(United States) J. Parmly Paret	(United States) P. B. Ruggles	6–1, 6–1, 6–3
1901	(United States) J. Parmly Paret (2)	(United States) Irving Wright	6–3, 6–2, 6–3
1902	(United States) Harold Hackett	(United States) C. C. Kelley	7–5, 6–3, 4–6, 6–0
1903	(United States) J. Parmly Paret (3)	(United States) Robert LeRoy	4–6, 6–3, 6–4, 6–2
1904	(United States) Robert LeRoy	(United States) Fred Anderson	7–5, default
1905	(United States) Fred Anderson	(United States) Harold Hackett	6–2, 5-2, default
1906	(United States) Harold Hackett (2)	(United States) C. C. Kelley	6–4, 7–5, 8–6
1907	(United States) Harold Hackett (3)	(United States) Henry Mollenhauer	6–2, 6–3, 1–6, 1–6, 6–2
1908	(United States) Ross Burchard	(United States) Gustave F. Touchard	6–4, 9–7, 5–7, 6–1
1909	(United States) Gustave F. Touchard	(United States) Theodore Pell	6–4, 3–6, 6–3, 12–10
1910	(United States) Gustave F. Touchard (2)	(United States) Wylie Grant	6–3, 10–8, 1–6, 6–2
1911	(United States) Gustave F. Touchard (3)	(United States) Walter Merrill Hall	4–6, 7–5, 6–3, 4–6, 6–2
1912	(United States) Wylie Grant	(United States) S. Howard Voshell	6–2, 10–8, 6–1
1914	(United States) Arthur Lovibond	(United States) Hasley Wood	6–4, 6–4, 6–4
1915	(United States) Arthur Lovibond (2)	(United States) Arthur Waite	6–1, 6–3, 8–6, 7–9, 6–4
1918	(United States) Bill Tilden	(United States) S. Howard Voshell	6–4, 4–6, 6–2, 3–6, 6–2
1919	(United States) S. Howard Voshell	(United States) Harold Throckmorton	6–0, 6–3, 4–6, 6–1
1920	(Japan) Ichiya Kumagae	(United States) S. Howard Voshell	6–0, 6–1, 6–3
1921	(United States) Vincent Richards	(United States) A. J. Cawse	6–0, 6–2, 6–4
1922	(United States) Vincent Richards (2)	(United States) Francis Hunter	6–2, 6–4, 3–6, 6–4
1923	(United States) George King	(United States) Watson Washburn	6–4, 0–6, 6–3, 6–2
1924	(United States) Herbert Bowman	(United States) Elliot Binzen	6–4, 6–2, 6–3
1925	(United States) Bill Tilden (2)	(United States) Vincent Richards	6–3, 6–3, 6–4
1926	(United States) Francis Hunter	(United States) Percy Kynaston	6–0, 6–0, 6–4
1927	(United States) Frank Shields	(United States) Gregory Mangin	5-7, 6–4, 3–6, 6–3, 6–4
1928	(United States) Julius Seligson	(United States) Herbert Bowman	7-5, 3–6, 6–2, 6–0

=== Women's singles ===
(Incomplete roll; not held every year)

Year	Champions	Runners-up	Score
1886	(United States) Miss Smallwood	(United States) Miss Leslie	6–3, 6–4
1887	(United States) Miss Smallwood (2)	(United States) Miss Grundy	6–4, 1–6, 6–2
1888	(United States) Mrs. Badgeley	(United States) unknown	unknown
1890	(United States) Adeline McKinlay	(United States) Miss V. Hobart	6–3, 6–4
1903	(United States) Elisabeth Moore	(United States) Anna Risch	6–3, 6–4, 6–4
1908	(United States) Elisabeth Moore (2)	(United States) Margret Johnson	6–2, 7–5
1916	(Norway) Molla Bjurstedt	(United States) Marie Wagner	6–3, 6–3
1917	(United States) Marie Wagner	(United States) Bessie Holden	6–2, 6–1
