= William Cragin =

American tennis player (1876–1943)

- Full name: William Briggs Cragin Jr.
- Country (sports): United States
- Born: September 21, 1876 Fairfield, Connecticut, US
- Died: September 16, 1943 (aged 66) Los Angeles, California, US

Grand Slam singles results
- US Open: QF (1909, 1910)

William Briggs Cragin Jr. (September 21, 1876 – September 16, 1943) was an American tennis player active in the early 20th century.

== Tennis career ==
Cragin reached the quarterfinals of the U.S. National Championships in 1909 and 1910, having to qualify in the former via the preliminary round. In 1911 and 1912 he was runner-up in singles at the U.S. National Indoor Championships. Partnering Gustave F. Touchard, he was the runner-up in doubles at the 1914 U.S. National Indoor Championships.
