= 1910 U.S. National Championships (tennis) =

- Date: August 15–25 (M); June 20–26 (W)
- Edition: 30th
- Category: Grand Slam
- Surface: Grass
- Location: Newport, R.I., United States (M); Philadelphia, PA, United States (W)
- Venue: Newport Casino (M); Philadelphia Cricket Club (W)

Champions

Men's singles
- (United States) William Larned

Women's singles
- (United States) Hazel Hotchkiss

Men's doubles
- (United States) Fred Alexander / (United States) Harold Hackett

Women's doubles
- (United States) Hazel Hotchkiss / (United States) Edith Rotch

Mixed doubles
- (United States) Hazel Hotchkiss / (United States) Joseph Carpenter, Jr.
- U.S. National Championships

The 1910 U.S. National Championships (now known as the US Open) took place on the outdoor grass courts at the Newport Casino in Newport, Rhode Island. The men's singles tournament ran from August 15 until August 25 while the women's singles and doubles championship took place from June 20 to June 26 at the Philadelphia Cricket Club in Chestnut Hill. It was the 30th staging of the U.S. National Championships, and the third Grand Slam tennis event of the year.

== Finals ==
=== Men's singles ===
(United States) William Larned (USA) defeated (United States) Tom Bundy (USA) 6–1, 5–7, 6–0, 6–8, 6–1

=== Women's singles ===
(United States) Hazel Hotchkiss (USA) defeated (United States) Louise Hammond (USA) 6–4, 6–2

=== Men's doubles ===
(United States) Fred Alexander (USA) / (United States) Harold Hackett (USA) defeated (United States) Tom Bundy (USA) / (United States) Trowridge Hendrick (USA) 6–1, 8–6, 6–3

=== Women's doubles ===
(United States) Hazel Hotchkiss (USA) / (United States) Edith Rotch (USA) defeated (United States) Adelaide Browning (USA) / (United States) Edna Wildey (USA) 6–4, 6–4

=== Mixed doubles ===
(United States) Hazel Hotchkiss (USA) / (United States) Joseph Carpenter, Jr. (USA) defeated (United States) Edna Wildey (USA) / (United States) Herbert M. Tilden (USA) 6–2, 6–2

Preceded by 1910 Wimbledon Championships	Grand Slams	Succeeded by 1911 Wimbledon Championships
