= 1911 U.S. National Championships (tennis) =

- Date: August 21 – September 3 (M); June 12 – 17 (W)
- Edition: 31st
- Category: Grand Slam
- Surface: Grass (outdoor)
- Location: Newport, R.I., United States (M); Philadelphia, PA, United States (W)
- Venue: Newport Casino (M); Philadelphia Cricket Club (W)

Champions

Men's singles
- (United States) William Larned

Women's singles
- (United States) Hazel Hotchkiss

Men's doubles
- (United States) Raymond Little / (United States) Gustav Touchard

Women's doubles
- (United States) Hazel Hotchkiss / (United States) Eleonora Sears

Mixed doubles
- (United States) Hazel Hotchkiss / (United States) Wallace F. Johnson
- U.S. National Championships

The 1911 U.S. National Championships (now known as the US Open) took place on the outdoor grass courts at the Newport Casino in Newport, Rhode Island. The men's singles tournament ran from August 21 until September 3 while the women's singles and doubles championship took place from June 12 to June 17 at the Philadelphia Cricket Club in Chestnut Hill. It was the 31st staging of the U.S. National Championships, and the second Grand Slam tennis event of the year. William Larned won the men's singles championship for a record seventh and final time.

== Finals ==
=== Men's singles ===
(United States) William Larned (USA) defeated (United States) Maurice McLoughlin (USA) 6–4, 6–4, 6–2

=== Women's singles ===
(United States) Hazel Hotchkiss (USA) defeated (United States) Florence Sutton (USA) 8–10, 6–1, 9–7

=== Men's doubles ===
(United States) Raymond Little (USA) / (United States) Gustav Touchard (USA) defeated (United States) Fred Alexander (USA) / (United States) Harold Hackett (USA) 7–5, 13–15, 6–2, 6–4

=== Women's doubles ===
(United States) Hazel Hotchkiss (USA) / (United States) Eleonora Sears (USA) defeated (United States) Dorothy Green (USA) / (United States) Florence Sutton (USA) 6–4, 4–6, 6–2

=== Mixed doubles ===
(United States) Hazel Hotchkiss (USA) / (United States) Wallace F. Johnson (USA) defeated (United States) Edna Wildey (USA) / (United States) Herbert M. Tilden (USA) 6–4, 6–4

Preceded by 1911 Wimbledon Championships	Grand Slams	Succeeded by 1911 Australasian Championships
