= 1910 U.S. National Championships – Women's singles =

Women's singles
- 1910 U.S. National Championships

Final
- Champion: (United States) Hazel Hotchkiss
- Runner-up: (United States) Louise Hammond
- Score: 6–4, 6–2

Details
- Draw: 29
- Seeds: –

Events
Singles	men	women
Doubles	men	women
- U.S. National Championships

Reigning champion Hazel Hotchkiss won the singles tennis title of the 1910 U.S. Women's National Singles Championship by defeating Louise Hammond 6–4, 6–2 in the challenge round. Hammond had won the right to challenge Hotchkiss by defeating Adelaide Browning 6–2, 6–4 in the final of the All Comers' competition. The event was played on outdoor grass courts and held at the Philadelphia Cricket Club in Wissahickon Heights, Chestnut Hill, Philadelphia, from June 20 through June 26, 1910.

== Draw ==
=== Challenge round ===
Challenge Round
(United States) Hazel Hotchkiss	6	6
(United States) Louise Hammond	4	2

=== All Comers' finals ===
Quarterfinals
(United States) Carrie Neely	1	6
(United States) Louise Hammond	6	8
(United States) Connie Sullivan	2	4
(United States) Edith Rotch	6	6
(United States) Edna Wildey	6	6
(Canada) Lois Moyes	3	4
(United States) Adelaide Browning	3	6	6
(United States) Dorothy Green	6	3	2

Semifinals
(United States) Louise Hammond	7	6
(United States) Edith Rotch	5	2
(United States) Edna Wildey	1	4
(United States) Adelaide Browning	6	6

Finals
(United States) Louise Hammond	6	6
(United States) Adelaide Browning	2	4

Preceded by 1910 Wimbledon Championships – Women's singles	Grand Slam women's singles	Succeeded by 1911 Wimbledon Championships – Women's singles
