= 1909 U.S. National Championships – Men's singles =

Men's singles
- 1909 U.S. National Championships

Final
- Champion: (United States) William Larned
- Runner-up: (United States) William Clothier
- Score: 6–1, 6–2, 5–7, 1–6, 6–1

Events
| Singles | men | women |
| Doubles | men | women |
| ← 1908 · | U.S. National Championships | · 1910 → |

Defending champion William Larned defeated William Clothier in the Challenge Round 6–1, 6–2, 5–7, 1–6, 6–1 to win the men's singles tennis title at the 1909 U.S. National Championships. Clothier defeated Maurice McLoughlin in the All Comers' Final.

The event was held at the Newport Casino in Newport, R.I. in the United States. There were more than 128 players in the draw.

== Challenge round ==
| Challenge Round |
| (United States) William Larned | 6 | 6 | 5 | 1 | 6 |
| (United States) William Clothier | 1 | 2 | 7 | 6 | 1 |

== All Comers' finals ==
Quarterfinals
(United States) William Clothier | 6 | 7 | 6
(United States) Edward Whitney | 1 | 5 | 4
(United States) Tom Bundy | 6 | 7 | 6
(United States) William Cragin | 1 | 5 | 2
(United States) Richard Palmer | 5 | 4 | 2
(United States) Maurice McLoughlin | 7 | 6 | 6
(United States) Fred Inman | 4 | 6 | 6 | 6 | 2
(United States) Gus Touchard | 6 | 4 | 4 | 8 | 6

Semifinals
(United States) William Clothier | 7 | 7 | 6
(United States) Tom Bundy | 5 | 5 | 3
(United States) Maurice McLoughlin | 6 | 4 | 7 | 6
(United States) Gus Touchard | 3 | 6 | 5 | 2

Finals
(United States) William Clothier | 7 | 6 | 9 | 6
(United States) Maurice McLoughlin | 5 | 4 | 11 | 3

== Earlier rounds ==
1st round - H. Simmons (United States) d. (United States) W. Jones w/o
R. Gaunt (United States) d. (United States) W. Manice 6–1,6–3,6–0
G. Adee (United States) d. (United States) C. Woodward w/o
R. Stevens (United States) d. (United States) G. Brooke w/o
H. Powell (United States) d. (United States) J. Darragh 6–3,4–6,6–4,6–3
H. Martin (United States) d. (United States) W. Connell 6–0,6–3,8–6
W. Cragin (United States) d. (United States) W. Finley 6–0,6–0,6–1
I. Thomas (United States) d. (United States) R. McCloud 3–6,6–4,6–1,6–4
S. Cutting (United States) d. (United States) A. Cassils 6–2,6–2,6–4
G. Hobbs (United States) d. (United States)
G. Hinckley (United States) d. (United States) C. Gardner w/o
E. Taylor (United States) d. (United States) C. Porter 4–6,6–2,6–4,6–3
N. Niles (United States) d. (United States) S. Beals w/o
A. Reggio (United States) d. (United States) C. Hobart w/o
A. Neargaard (United States) d. (United States) J. Jones w/o
J. Snow (United States) d. (United States) A. Thacher w/o
S. Millett (United States) d. (United States) G. Wagner w/o
T. Pell (United States) d. (United States) D. Mathey 6–2,6–4,6–2
G. Janes (United States) d. (United States) J. Williams 6–1,6–0,6–2
G. Gardner (United States) d. (United States) W. Keene w/o
P. Hawk (United States) d. (United States) C. Pell 1–6,6–0,17–15,9–7
F. Colston (United States) d. (United States) J. Ames 7–5,3–6,1–6,7–5,6–3
E. Donn (United States) d. (United States) S. Merrihew w/o
W. Johnson (United States) d. (United States) A. Winsor 6–2,6–0,6–0
O. Hinck (United States) d. (United States) W. Pate 6–2,6–1,6–1
S. Bain (United States) d. (United States) E. Torrey 8–6,3–6,6–4,1–6,6–2
W. Roberts (United States) d. (United States) L. Grant 6–3,6–0,6–1
W. Grant (United States) d. (United States) R. Terry w/o
E. Larned (United States) d. (United States) G. Rushmore w/o
D. Dilworth (United States) d. (United States) C. Hale w/o
T. Slidell (United States) d. (United States) W. Stewart w/o
C. Johnston (United States) d. (United States) R. LeRoy w/o
R. Palmer (United States) d. (United States) C. Watson w/o
H. Pell (United States) d. (United States) H. Tallant w/o
B. Rives (United States) d. (United States) P. Randolph w/o
R. Hazard (United States) d. (United States) A. Peterson w/o

2nd round - K. Behr (United States) d. (United States) W. Bourne 6–2,6–0,6–1
N. Wadsworth (United States) d. (United States) F. Soule 6–0,6–2,6–2
N. Vose (United States) d. (United States) H. Alexander w/o
C. Sands (United States) d. (United States) T. Blumer w/o
H. Slocum (United States) d. (United States) G. Thompson w/o
N. Peebles (United States) d. (United States) C. Runyan w/o
F. Hughes (United States) d. (United States) G. Parrish w/o
W. Clothier (United States) d. (United States) A. Dabney w/o
C. Cooke (United States) d. (United States) W. Grosvenor 6–1,6–0,6–2
E. Sheppard (United States) d. (United States) J. DuBarry 6–2,6–1,6–0
P. Fosdick (United States) d. (United States) H. Kirkover w/o
H. Scott (United States) d. (United States) F. Thomas 6–2,6–2,6–0
E. Whitney (United States) d. (United States) S. Sinsabaugh 7–5,6–2,6–1
W. Rosenbaum (United States) d. (United States) R. Oakley w/o
H. MacKinney (United States) d. (United States) F. Paul 8–6,7–5,6–3
G. Groesbeck (United States) d. (United States) H. Stiness w/o
S. Henshaw (United States) d. (United States) E. Frank 6–0,6–1,6–2
E. Leo (United States) d. (United States) G. Knowlton 6–2,7–5,6–3
T. Bundy (United States) d. (United States) W. Bennett 6–1,6–3,6–1
G. Church (United States) d. (United States) E. Gould 7–5,6–1,6–3
G. Smith (United States) d. (United States) S. Johnson 4–6,6–3,3–6,6–3,6–2
N. Johnson (United States) d. (United States) G. Douglas w/o
H. Ballou (United States) d. (United States) E. Cross w/o
R. Gaunt (United States) d. (United States) H. Simmons 4–6,8–6,6–0,2–6,6–3
R. Stevens (United States) d. (United States) G. Adee 3–6,6–2,9–7,6–1
H. Martin (United States) d. (United States) H. Powell 6–3,6–2,6–4
W. Cragin (United States) d. (United States) I. Thomas 6–0,6–0,6–0
S. Cutting (United States) d. (United States) G. Hobbs 6–1,6–0,6–0
G. Hinckley (United States) d. (United States) E. Taylor 7–5,6–2,3–6,4–6,6–2
N. Niles (United States) d. (United States) A. Reggio 6–3,6–3,6–1
A. Neargaard (United States) d. (United States) J. Snow w/o
T. Pell (United States) d. (United States) S. Millett w/o
G. Gardner (United States) d. (United States) G. Janes 8–6,1–6,1–6,7–5,8–6
F. Colston (United States) d. (United States) P. Hawk 6–3,6–4,6–4
W. Johnson (United States) d. (United States) E. Donn 6–0,6–1,6–1
O. Hinck (United States) d. (United States) S. Bain 6–2,6–1,6–3
W. Grant (United States) d. (United States) W. Roberts 6–2,5–7,6–1,6–1
E. Larned (United States) d. (United States) D. Dilworth w/o
T. Slidell (United States) d. (United States) C. Johnston 6–3,12-10,4–6,3–6,6–4
R. Palmer (United States) d. (United States) H. Pell 6–1,6–0,6–2
R. Hazard (United States) d. (United States) B. Rives 6–2,6–3,6–4
M. McLoughlin (United States) d. (United States) J. Willis 6–1,6–2,6–2
M. Long (United States) d. (United States) F. Harris 6–1,6–4,6–4
T. Trask (United States) d. (United States) C. Mills 6–0,6–2,6–0
C. Bull (United States) d. (United States) G. Dionne 6–2,6–1,3–6,6–0
J. Seabury (United States) d. (United States) G. Pike 4–6,7–5,6–4,6–0
R. Thomas (United States) d. (United States) G. Hollister w/o
A. Stillman (United States) d. (United States) L. Wallis 8–10,6–1,10–8,6–4
R. Seaver (United States) d. (United States) J. Neely 6–0,6–4,6–4
F. Inman (United States) d. (United States) F. Williams w/o
C. Plimpton (United States) d. (United States) W. Patten w/o
A. Gammell (United States) d. (United States) R. Bishop w/o
C. King (United States) d. (United States) T. Potter 2–6,6–4,6–4,6–4
E. Stille (United States) d. (United States) G. Phelps w/o
C. Rogers (United States) d. (United States) J. Kopf 6–1,6–4,6–3
F. Burnham (United States) d. (United States) D. Woodward 6–3,6–3,6–0
F. Sulloway (United States) d. (United States) G. Beals 6–3,6–4,6–1
A. Baker (United States) d. (United States) G. McFadden w/o
R. Gambrill (United States) d. (United States) G. Keeler 6–0,6–0,6–0
G. Touchard (United States) d. (United States) D. Meyer w/o
C. Runyan (United States) d. (United States) P. Martin w/o
S. Pendergast (United States) d. (United States) S. French 6–1,6–0,6–0
B. Wagenr (United States) d. (United States) S. H. Boshell 6–3,6–1,6–2
B. Colie (United States) d. (United States) G. Leamy w/o

3rd round - K. Behr (United States) d. (United States) N. Wadsworth 6–4,1–6,6–2,6–1
C. Sands (United States) d. (United States) N. Vose 6–1,6–2,6–4
H. Slocum (United States) d. (United States) N. Peebles 6–3,3–6,7–5,6–3
W. Clothier (United States) d. (United States) F. Hughes w/o
C. Cooke (United States) d. (United States) E. Sheppard 6–0,6–0,7–5
H. Scott (United States) d. (United States) P. Fosdick 7–5,7–5,7–5
E. Whitney (United States) d. (United States) W. Rosenbaum w/o
H. MacKinney (United States) d. (United States) G. Groesbeck 6–2,8–6,6–2
S. Henshaw (United States) d. (United States) E. Leo 7–5,3–6,6–4,6–3
T. Bundy (United States) d. (United States) G. Church 4–6,6–1,7–5,6–3
N. Johnaon (United States) d. (United States) G. Smith 6–4,6–8,6–3,6–2
R. Gaunt (United States) d. (United States) H. Ballou 6–2,6–4,6–1
R. Stevens (United States) d. (United States) H. Martin w/o
W. Cragin (United States) d. (United States) S. Cutting 9–7,6–4,6–4
N. Niles (United States) d. (United States) G. Hinckley w/o
T. Pell (United States) d. (United States) A. Neargaard 6–2,6–2,6–1
F. Colston (United States) d. (United States) G. Gardner 6–2,3–6,6–1,7–5
W. Johnson (United States) d. (United States) G. Hinck 6–1,6–4,6–1
E. Larned (United States) d. (United States) W. Grant 6–2,6–0,6–4
R. Palmer (United States) d. (United States) T. Slidell 6–4,6–2,6–3
M. McLoughlin (United States) d. (United States) R. Hazard 6–3,6–1,6–1
M. Long (United States) d. (United States) T. Trask 6–3,6–4,6–0
C. Bull (United States) d. (United States) J. Seabury 2–6,6–2,6–2,6–4
A. Stillman (United States) d. (United States) R. Thomas 6–2,6–1,7–5
F. Inman (United States) d. (United States) R. Seaver 6–3,7–5,6–4
C. Plimpton (United States) d. (United States) A. Gammell 6–0,6–4,6–4
E. Stille (United States) d. (United States) C. King 6–1,6–3,3-3 rtd.
C. Rogers (United States) d. (United States) F. Burnham w/o
F. Sulloway (United States) d. (United States) A. Baker 6–2,6–1,6–2
G. Touchard (United States) d. (United States) R. Gambrill 6–0,6–0,6–4
S. Pendergast (United States) d. (United States) C. Runyan 6–0,6–0,6–3
B. Wagner (United States) d. (United States) B. Colie 6–0,6–1,6–1

4th round - K. Behr (United States) d. (United States) C. Sands w/o
W. Clothier (United States) d. (United States) H. Slocum 8–6,6–3,6–4
H. Scott (United States) d. (United States) C. Cooke
E. Whitney (United States) d. (United States) H. MacKinney 5–7,6–2,6–0,8–6
T. Bundy (United States) d. (United States) S. Henshaw 6–2,6–3,6–1
N. Johnson (United States) d. (United States) R. Gaunt 5–7,–64,6–3,6–1
W. Cragin (United States) d. (United States) R. Stevens 3–6,6–0,6–2,6–3
T. Pell (United States) d. (United States) N. Niles 3–6,6–4,3–6,6–4,8–6
F. Colston (United States) d. (United States) W. Johnson 3–6,6–4,6–3,1–6,6–3
R. Palmer (United States) d. (United States) E. Larned 5–7,6–4,6–2,6–1
M. McLoughlin (United States) d. (United States) M. Long 7–5,6–2,5–7,2–6,10–8
C. Bull (United States) d. (United States) A. Stillman 8–10,5–7,6–0,6–1,6–4
F. Inman (United States) d. (United States) C. Plimpton 6–4,6–4,6–3
C. Rogers (United States) d. (United States) E. Stille 6–0,7–5,6–0
G. Touchard (United States) d. (United States) F. Sulloway 6–3,4–6,6–4,6–4
B. Wagner (United States) d. (United States) S. Pendergast 6–4,4–6,6–2,9–7

5th round - W. Clothier (United States) d. (United States) K. Behr 2–6,6–2,6–3,6–4
E. Whitney (United States) d. (United States) H. Scott 5–7,6–0,6–2,6–3
T. Bundy (United States) d. (United States) N. Johnson 6–0,6–0,6–1
W. Cragin (United States) d. (United States) T. Pell 2–6,6–2,6–4,6–3
R. Palmer (United States) d. (United States) F. Colston 0–6,6–4,6–1,5–7,6–4
M. McLoughlin (United States) d. (United States) C. Bull 6–4,6–4,6–2
F. Inman (United States) d. (United States) C. Rogers 6–4,6–2,6–2
G. Touchard (United States) d. (United States) B. Wagner 6–3,6–2,10–8

| Preceded by 1909 Wimbledon Championships – Men's singles | Grand Slam men's singles | Succeeded by 1910 Australasian Championships – Men's singles |
