= 1911 U.S. National Championships – Men's singles =

Men's singles
- 1911 U.S. National Championships

Final
- Champion: (United States) William Larned
- Runner-up: (United States) Maurice McLoughlin
- Score: 6–4, 6–4, 6–2

Events
Singles	men	women
Doubles	men	women
- U.S. National Championships

Defending champion William Larned defeated Maurice McLoughlin in the Challenge Round 6–4, 6–4, 6–2 to win the men's singles tennis title at the 1911 U.S. National Championships. McLoughlin defeated Beals Wright in the All Comers' Final.

The event was held at the Newport Casino in Newport, R.I. in the United States. There were more than 128 players in the draw.

== Challenge round ==
Challenge Round
(United States) William Larned	6	6	6
(United States) Maurice McLoughlin	4	4	2

== All Comers' finals ==
Quarterfinals
(United States) Carlton Gardner	3	4	5
(United States) Gus Touchard	6	6	7
(United States) Maurice McLoughlin	6	6	6
(United States) Watson Washburn	1	2	4
(United States) Beals Wright	6	1	6	10	7
(United States) Nathaniel Niles	8	6	3	8	5
(United States) Tom Bundy	6	8	6
(United States) Jed Jones	3	6	3

Semifinals
(United States) Gus Touchard	2	4	3
(United States) Maurice McLoughlin	6	6	6
(United States) Beals Wright	6	6	6
(United States) Tom Bundy	4	3	1

Finals
(United States) Maurice McLoughlin	6	4	7	6
(United States) Beals Wright	4	6	5	3

== Earlier rounds ==
1st round - W. Rosenbaum (United States) d. (United States) G. Parrish w/o
R. Dana (United States) d. (United States) N. Johnson w/o
O. Pepper (United States) d. (United States) A. Kennedy jr w/o
J. Nelson (United States) d. (United States) T. Sailor 6-1,6-3,6-3
J. Ames (United States) d. (United States) R. McClave 6-0,6-2,6-2
R. Little (United States) d. (United States) F. French w/o
F. Fall (United States) d. (United States) D. Noblit 6-2,6-3,6-4
A. Bell (United States) d. (United States) E. Palmer w/o
F. Harris (United States) d. (United States) W. Palmer w/o
R. Schwengers (United States) d. (United States) L. Brown w/o
K. Behr (United States) d. (United States) R. Stevens 6-4,4-6,6-4,6-4
W. Hall (United States) d. (United States) W. Bates w/o
F. Robinson (United States) d. (United States) L. Hobbs 4-6,6-4,5-7,6-3,8-6
N. Emmons (United States) d. (United States) N. Wendall w/o
N. Vose (United States) d. (United States) R. Crouse w/o
T. Slidwell (United States) d. (United States) G. Hill w/o
H. Thomas (United States) d. (United States) H. Clark w/o
A. Cragin (United States) d. (United States) E. Stille 6-3,6-1,6-3
W. Washburn (United States) d. (United States) E. Carrol w/o
E. Woods (United States) d. (United States) P. Harrower w/o
E. Middleton (United States) d. (United States) G. Adee w/o
H. Webber (United States) d. (United States) G. Frailey 6-3,1-6,6-1,7-5
G. Groesbeck (United States) d. (United States) B. Phillips w/o
E. Larned (United States) d. (United States) A. Champlin 6-0,6-0,6-1
A. Dabney (United States) d. (United States) A. Merriam 6-1,6-1,6-4
J. Billings (United States) d. (United States) E. Peck
C. Cole (United States) d. (United States) E. Frank 6-1,6-3,6-1
M. McLoughlin (United States) d. (United States) G. Nettleton 6-2,6-4,6-3
T. Pell (United States) d. (United States) M. Chace w/o
F. Roche (United States) d. (United States) W. Iselin 7-5,6-2,6-3
C. Cutting (United States) d. (United States) W. Heyl 6-2,6-2,6-1
P. Fosdick (United States) d. (United States) F. Jones 6-1,6-2,6-1
J. Cushman (United States) d. (United States) J. Lippincott 6-1,6-0,6-1
B. Law (United States) d. (United States) G. Post w/o
T. Ridgeway (United States) d. (United States) S. Merrihew 6-3,10-8,6-3
G. Gardner (United States) d. (United States) P. Cummings 6-0,6-2,6-1
H. Tallant (United States) d. (United States) R. Stead 6-1,6-0,6-0
A. Lapsley (United States) d. (United States) C. Richardson w/o
C. Andrews (United States) d. (United States) C. Neibel 6-0,6-3,6-2
E. Carroll (United States) d. (United States) H. Johnson w/o
G. Bartholemew (United States) d. (United States) C. Sands w/o
J. Carpenter (United States) d. (United States) W. Bourne 6-0,6-0,6-3
G. Beals (United States) d. (United States) S. Heaton w/o
W. Connell (United States) d. (United States) C. Smith 6-1,6-3,6-1
S. Pearson (United States) d. (United States) F. Hall 6-3,5-7,6-2,4-6,6-2
C. Lipscom (United States) d. (United States) R. Bishop w/o
G. Lyon (United States) d. (United States) F. Frelinghuysen 6-4,6-3,6-2
D. Josephs (United States) d. (United States) L. Thomas 6-3,6-3,6-3
J. Brown (United States) d. (United States) J. DuBarry w/o
W. Hunt (United States) d. (United States) J. Tomlinson w/o
B. Wright (United States) d. (United States) J. Alexander 6-0,6-1,6-0
E. Lloyd (United States) d. (United States) A. Thurber w/o
W. Anderson (United States) d. (United States) H. Colton 6-1,7-5,6-2
N. Niles (United States) d. (United States) C. Bull 6-0,6-1,6-0
H. Chormley (United States) d. (United States) G. Thompson w/o
W. Williams (United States) d. (United States) L. Grant 6-1,6-3,6-0
G. Wightman (United States) d. (United States) W. Low 6-0,6-1,6-2
R. Gates (United States) d. (United States) G. Drew w/o
L. Waider (United States) d. (United States) G. Hobbs 6-1,6-0,6-2
S. Minot (United States) d. (United States) O. Marshall 6-2,6-3,6-2
M. Long (United States) d. (United States) L. Wilmerding w/o
J. Devereux (United States) d. (United States) G. Ordway 6-3,6-0,6-0
E. Leonard (United States) d. (United States) C. Hatch w/o
J. Nicholl (United States) d. (United States) W. Clothier w/o
M. Charlock (United States) d. (United States) T. Williams 6-2,6-1,6-1
H. Peck (United States) d. (United States) P. Ingraham w/o
M. Whiting (United States) d. (United States) L. Walthall w/o
G. Gallatin (United States) d. (United States) F. Bassett w/o
G. Caner (United States) d. (United States) F. Winsor w/o
D. Mathey (United States) d. (United States) E. Fischer w/o
E. Whitney (United States) d. (United States) D. Appleton 6-1,6-4,6-2
T. Bundy (United States) d. (United States) F. Inman 4-6,6-4,6-0,6-2
R. Seaver (United States) d. (United States) C. Fisher 6-1,5-7,6-3,6-4
R. Weeden (United States) d. (United States) C. Cutting w/o

2nd round - H. Slocum (United States) d. (United States) S. Adams 6-3,6-1,6-0
L. Curtis (United States) d. (United States) A. Cassils 6-1,2-6,7-5,1-6,6-2
W. Roberts (United States) d. (United States) F. Washburn 7-5,2-6,13-11,2-6,6-2
E. Gross (United States) d. (United States) A. Sands 6-1,7-5,6-3
J. Armstrong (United States) d. (United States) C. Beck 6-1,6-0,6-1
J. Brown (United States) d. (United States) W. Astor 6-1,6-1,6-4
W. Burton (United States) d. (United States) R. Bray 6-3,3-6,6-3,6-1
C. Gardner (United States) d. (United States) F. Watrous 6-3,6-3,6-4
W. Pate (United States) d. (United States) F. Paul w/o
E. Peaslee (United States) d. (United States) H. Simmons 6-2,6-3,2-6,6-3
G. Touchard (United States) d. (United States) J. McVeagh w/o
F. Gates (United States) d. (United States) R. Lyman 6-1,6-4,6-1
G. Grier (United States) d. (United States) R. Stevenson 3-6,8-6,6-0,6-0
R. Palmer (United States) d. (United States) W. Rosenbaum 6-2,6-4,1-6,6-3
R. Dana (United States) d. (United States) O. Pepper 6-0,6-1,6-0
J. Ames (United States) d. (United States) J. Nelson 6-1,6-2,5-7,5-7,6-4
R. Little (United States) d. (United States) F. Fall 6-1,6-2,6-2
F. Harris (United States) d. (United States) A. Bell 6-0,6-0,6-0
K. Behr (United States) d. (United States) R. Schwengers 6-0,6-1,6-3
W. Hall (United States) d. (United States) F. Robinson 6-0,6-1,6-1
N. Vose (United States) d. (United States) N. Emmons 6-3,7-5,6-0
G. Slidwell (United States) d. (United States) H. Thomas 6-2,6-3,6-0
W. Washburn (United States) d. (United States) A. Cragin 6-4,6-4,6-2
E. Middleton (United States) d. (United States) E. Woods w/o
G. Groesbeck (United States) d. (United States) H. Webber 7-5,6-0,6-0
A. Dabney (United States) d. (United States) E. Larned 6-4,2-6,6-2,9-11,6-1
C. Cole (United States) d. (United States) J. Billings 6-2,2-6,6-2,4-6,6-3
M. McLoughlin (United States) d. (United States) T. Pell w/o
C. Cutting (United States) d. (United States) F. Roche 6-1,6-2,6-1
J. Cushman (United States) d. (United States) P. Fosdick 6-1,7-5,6-1
T. Ridgeway (United States) d. (United States) B. Law 6-1,2-6,7-5,6-4
G. Gardner (United States) d. (United States) H. Tallant 6-3,6-3 rtd.
C. Andrews (United States) d. (United States) A. Lapsley w/o
G. Bartholemew (United States) d. (United States) E. Carroll w/o
J. Carpenter (United States) d. (United States) G. Beals 6-2,6-2,6-3
S. Pearson (United States) d. (United States) W. Connell 7-5,2-6,8-6,6-3
G. Lyon (United States) d. (United States) C. Lipscom 0-6,6-0,6-1,6-0
J. Brown (United States) d. (United States) D. Josephs 3-6,6-4,6-2,6-2
B. Wright (United States) d. (United States) W. Hunt 6-0,6-1,6-1
W. Anderson (United States) d. (United States) E. Lloyd 6-0,6-1,6-0
N. Niles (United States) d. (United States) H. Chormley 6-0,6-0,6-0
G. Wightman (United States) d. (United States) W. Williams 6-0,6-0,6-0
L. Waidner (United States) d. (United States) R. Gates 6-1,6-1,6-1
M. Long (United States) d. (United States) S. Minot 6-3,6-2,6-4
J. Devereux (United States) d. (United States) E. Leonard w/o
J. Nicholl (United States) d. (United States) M. Charlock 4-6,0-6,10-8,6-1,6-0
M. Whiting (United States) d. (United States) H. Peck 6-4,6-1,6-0
G. Caner (United States) d. (United States) G. Gallatin 6-4,6-2,6-3
D. Mathey (United States) d. (United States) E. Whitney 2-6,8-6,7-5,7-5
T. Bundy (United States) d. (United States) R. Seaver 6-3,6-0,7-5
W. Burden (United States) d. (United States) R. Weeden 6-1,6-0,6-0
W. Schroeder (United States) d. (United States) E. Woods w/o
H. MacKinney (United States) d. (United States) R. Black 11-9,6-3,6-2
C. Adams (United States) d. (United States) E. Torrey w/o
G. Church (United States) d. (United States) J. Jackson 6-1,6-1,6-1
B. Wagner (United States) d. (United States) Q. McKean 6-1,7-5,5-7,6-2
A. Hammett (United States) d. (United States) S. Henshaw 6-2,4-6,6-4,6-3
B. M. Grant (United States) d. (United States) P. Hawk w/o
W. Johnson (United States) d. (United States) F. Pelzer 6-0,6-3,6-4
C. Bull (United States) d. (United States) E. Pendergast 6-2,6-2,6-2
C. Leonard (United States) d. (United States) W. O'Brien 6-2,6-4,6-2
W. Izard (United States) d. (United States) L. Freeman 8-6,6-4,6-3
C. Biddle (United States) d. (United States) G. Nichols 6-3,6-0,6-1
J. Jones (United States) d. (United States) R. McCloud 6-4,6-0,6-0

3rd round - H. Slocum (United States) d. (United States) L. Curtis 6-3,6-0,6-2
E. Gross (United States) d. (United States) W. Roberts 6-3,6-4,6-2
J. Armstrong (United States) d. (United States) J. Brown 6-3,6-3,6-2
C. Gardner (United States) d. (United States) W. Burton 7-5,6-3,6-4
W. Pate (United States) d. (United States) E. Peaslee 6-3,6-4,6-2
G. Touchard (United States) d. (United States) F. Gates 6-3,4-6,5-7,6-3,6-1
R. Palmer (United States) d. (United States) G. Grier 6-1,6-2,6-2
J. Ames (United States) d. (United States) R. Dana 10-8,6-1,6-1
R. Little (United States) d. (United States) F. Harris 6-4,6-1,6-3
K. Behr (United States) d. (United States) W. Hall 6-3,4-6,6-2,6-0
T. Slidwell (United States) d. (United States) N. Vose 6-2,6-0,6-0
W. Washburn (United States) d. (United States) E. Middleton 6-3,6-3,6-4
A. Dabney (United States) d. (United States) G. Groesbeck 6-4,6-0,6-1
M. McLoughlin (United States) d. (United States) C. Cole 6-2,6-1,6-1
C. Cutting (United States) d. (United States) J. Cushman 6-3,6-2,6-1
G. Gardner (United States) d. (United States) T. Ridgeway 6-1,6-0,6-4
C. Andrews (United States) d. (United States) G. Bartholemew 6-3,6-2,6-4
J. Carpenter (United States) d. (United States) S. Pearson 6-1,6-1,6-4
G. Lyon (United States) d. (United States) J. Brown 6-3,6-1,6-3
B. Wright (United States) d. (United States) W. Anderson 6-0,6-1,6-2
N. Niles (United States) d. (United States) G. Wightman 6-3,6-0,6-3
M. Long (United States) d. (United States) L. Waidner 6-3,3-6,7-5,6-1
J. Devereux (United States) d. (United States) J. Nicholl w/o
G. Caner (United States) d. (United States) M. Whiting 6-4,6-2,6-2
T. Bundy (United States) d. (United States) D. Mathey 6-1,6-2,0-6,6-3
W. Burden (United States) d. (United States) W. Schroeder 6-0,6-0,6-2
H. MacKinney (United States) d. (United States) C. Adams 6-4,4-6,6-2,10-8
G. Church (United States) d. (United States) B. Wagner 6-2,6-0,6-2
A. Hammett (United States) d. (United States) B. M. Grant 6-2,6-3,6-3
C. Bull (United States) d. (United States) W. Johnson 6-4,6-8,6-8,7-5,6-4
C. Leonard (United States) d. (United States) W. Izard 7-9,6-0,6-2,2-6,6-2
J. Jones (United States) d. (United States) C. Biddle 6-3,6-2,6-1

4th round - E. Gross (United States) d. (United States) H. Slocum 6-3,3-6,6-4,6-3
C. Gardner (United States) d. (United States) J. Armstrong 6-1,6-2,6-2
G. Touchard (United States) d. (United States) W. Pate 6-4,8-6,6-2
R. Palmer (United States) d. (United States) J. Ames 6-4,4-6,2-6,8-6,6-2
R. Little (United States) d. (United States) K. Behr 6-0,10-8,6-8,1-6,6-4
W. Washburn (United States) d. (United States) T. Slidwell 6-8,8-6,6-3,6-3
M. McLoughlin (United States) d. (United States) A. Dabney 6-3,6-2,7-5
G. Gardner (United States) d. (United States) C. Cutting 6-3,6-2,6-2
C. Andrews (United States) d. (United States) J. Carpenter 6-1,6-1,2-6,6-4
B. Wright (United States) d. (United States) G. Lyon 6-3,6-4,6-4
N. Niles (United States) d. (United States) M. Long 6-4,6-2,3-6,6-3
G. Caner (United States) d. (United States) J. Devereux 6-3,6-3,6-3
T. Bundy (United States) d. (United States) W. Burden 6-3,6-4,6-4
G. Church (United States) d. (United States) H. MacKinney 6-3,6-1,8-6
C. Bull (United States) d. (United States) A. Hammett 4-6,6-3,6-4,6-3
J. Jones (United States) d. (United States) C. Leonard 6-4,6-0,6-0

5th round - C. Gardner (United States) d. (United States) E. Gross 3-6,6-3,6-4,6-3
G. Touchard (United States) d. (United States) R. Palmer 6-1,6-3,6-4
W. Washburn (United States) d. (United States) R. Little 9-7,5-7,3-6,6-2,6-4
M. McLoughlin (United States) d. (United States) G. Gardner 6-4,6-4,8-6
B. Wright (United States) d. (United States) C. Andrews 6-1,6-4,4-6,6-2
N. Niles (United States) d. (United States) G. Caner 6-1,6-1,6-2
T. Bundy (United States) d. (United States) G. Church 8-6,3-6,6-8,6-1,7-5
J. Jones (United States) d. (United States) C. Bull 6-0,8-10,6-4,6-1

Preceded by 1911 Wimbledon Championships – Men's singles	Grand Slam men's singles	Succeeded by 1912 Australasian Championships – Men's singles
