= Hazel Hotchkiss Wightman =

American tennis and badminton player

Hazel Hotchkiss Wightman CBE
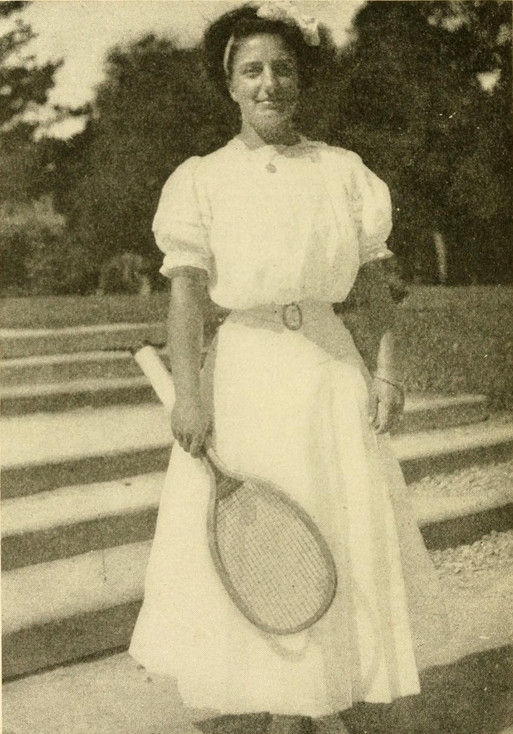
- Wightman in 1910
- Full name: Hazel Virginia Hotchkiss Wightman
- ITF name: Hazel Wightman
- Country (sports): United States
- Born: December 20, 1886 Healdsburg, California, U.S.
- Died: December 5, 1974 (aged 87) Newton, Massachusetts, U.S.
- Plays: Right-handed
- Int. Tennis HoF: 1957 (member page)

Grand Slam singles results
- Wimbledon: 3R (1924)
- US Open: W (1909, 1910, 1911, 1919)

Grand Slam doubles results
- Wimbledon: W (1924)
- US Open: W (1909, 1910, 1911, 1915, 1924, 1928)

Grand Slam mixed doubles results
- US Open: W (1909, 1910, 1911, 1915, 1918, 1920)
Medal record
Olympic Games – Tennis
Gold medal – first place	1924 Paris	Doubles
Gold medal – first place	1924 Paris	Mixed doubles

Hazel Virginia Hotchkiss Wightman, CBE (née Hotchkiss; December 20, 1886 – December 5, 1974) was an American tennis player and founder of the Wightman Cup, an annual team competition for British and American women. She dominated American women's tennis before World War I and won 45 U.S. titles during her life.

== Personal life ==
Wightman was born Hazel Virginia Hotchkiss in Healdsburg, California, to William Joseph and Emma Lucretia (Grove) Hotchkiss. In February 1912, at the age of 25, she married George W. Wightman of Boston. Her father-in-law, George Henry Wightman, was a leader in the steel industry, as an associate of Andrew Carnegie, and one of the country's foremost pioneers of amateur tennis.

She became a member of Kappa Kappa Gamma at the University of California, Berkeley and served as the chapter's president.

Wightman was the mother of five children. She died at her home in Chestnut Hill, Massachusetts on December 5, 1974, aged 87.

In 1973, Queen Elizabeth II made her an honorary Commander of the Order of the British Empire.

== Career highlights ==
Wightman dominated American women's tennis before World War I and had an unparalleled reputation for sportsmanship. Wightman won a lifetime total of 45 U.S. titles, the last at age 68. She won 16 titles overall at the U.S. Championships, four of them in singles (1909–11, 1919). Nine of her titles at the U.S. Championships came from 1909 to 1911, when she swept the singles, women's doubles, and mixed doubles competitions three consecutive years.

Wightman is known as the "Queen Mother of American Tennis" or "Lady Tennis" for her lifelong participation in and promotion of women's tennis and because she was instrumental in organizing the Ladies International Tennis Challenge between British and American women's teams, better known as the Wightman Cup. The cup first was held in 1923 and continued through 1989. She played five years on the American team and was the captain of the American team from inception of the competition through 1948. The cup was composed of five singles and two doubles matches. The cup was donated in 1923 by Wightman in honor of her husband. The first contest at Forest Hills, New York on August 11 and 13, 1923 was won by the United States.

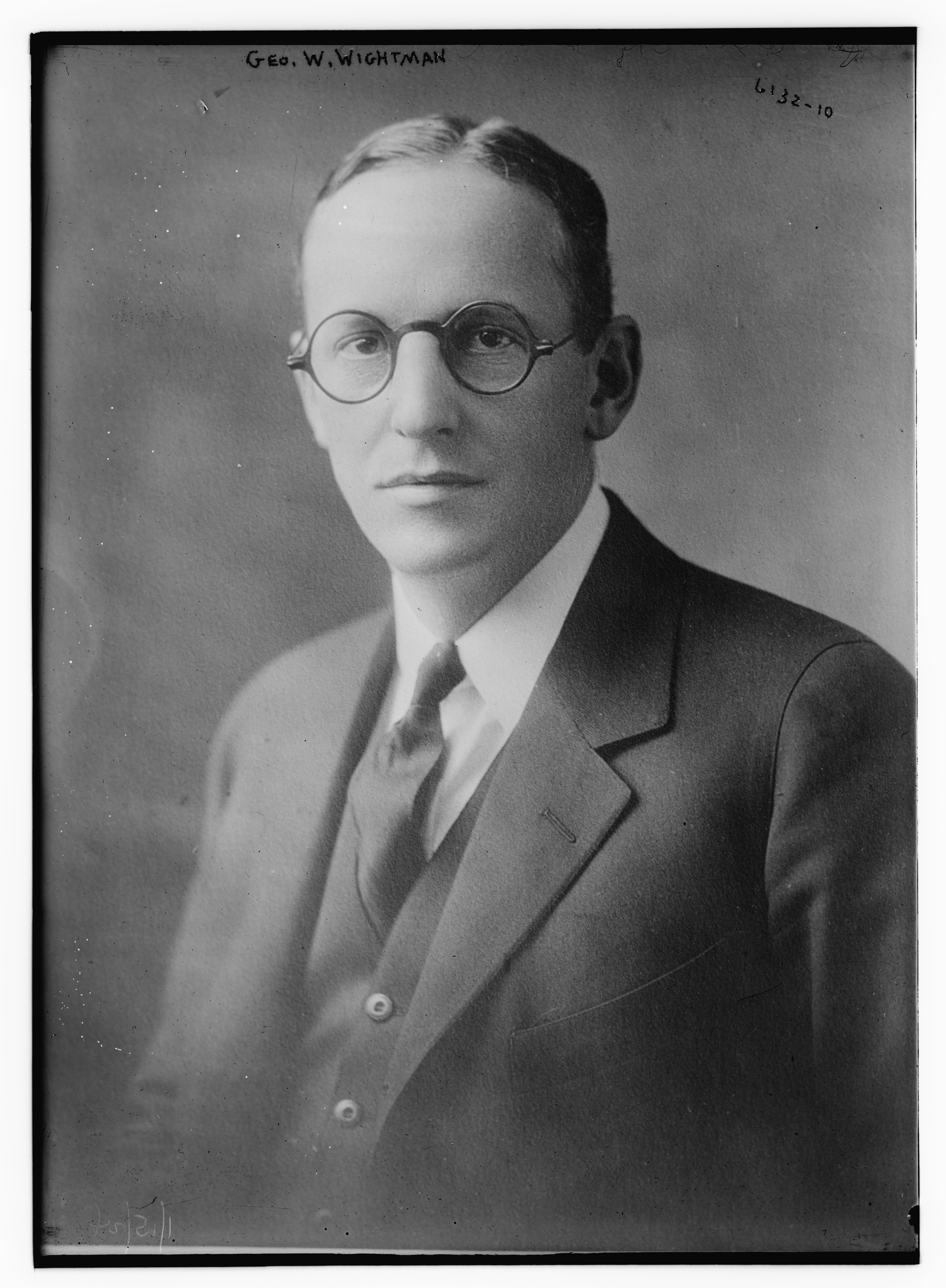
George W. Wightman

Born during the early days of American tennis, Wightman was a frail and awkward child. Her doctor recommended that she take up a sport to strengthen herself. Her brother suggested tennis as it was considered a "genteel" sport. Wightman learned to play at the nearby courts of the University of California, Berkeley where she graduated in 1911. Her rivalry with fellow Californian May Sutton shaped a new women's game, with Wightman attacking the net to counter Sutton's dominating forehand.

Wightman devoted herself to teaching young people, opening her home near Boston's Longwood Cricket Club to aspiring champions. In recognition of Wightman's contributions to tennis, the USTA Service Bowl was donated in her honor. In 1973, Wightman was appointed as an honorary Commander of the Order of the British Empire.

- 17 Grand Slam titles (4 singles, 7 women's doubles, 6 mixed doubles)
- Won all three titles at the U.S. Championships: 1909–1911
- Won singles title at the U.S. Championships: 1909–1911, 1919
- Runner-up in singles at the U.S. Championships: 1915
- Won women's doubles title at the U.S. Championships: 1909–1911, 1915, 1924, 1928
- Runner-up in women's doubles at the U.S. Championships: 1919, 1923
- Won mixed doubles title at the U.S. Championships: 1909–1911, 1915, 1918, 1920
- Runner-up in mixed doubles at the U.S. Championships: 1926
- Won women's doubles title at Wimbledon: 1924
- Olympic gold medalist in women's doubles and mixed doubles: 1924
- Won singles title at the U.S. Indoor Championships: 1919, 1927
- Won women's doubles title at the U.S. Indoor Championships: 1919, 1921, 1924, 1927–1931, 1933, 1943
- Runner-up in women's doubles at the U.S. Indoor Championships: 1923, 1926, 1932, 1941, 1946
- Won mixed doubles title at the U.S. Indoor Championships: 1923, 1924, 1926–1928
- Won doubles title at the U.S. Grass Court Championships (for age 40 and over): 1940–1942, 1944, 1946–1950, 1952, 1954
- U.S. Wightman Cup team member: 1923, 1924, 1927, 1929, 1931
- U.S. Wightman Cup team captain: 1923, 1924, 1927, 1929, 1931, 1933, 1935, 1937–1939, 1946–1948
- Winner of USTA Service Bowl, donated in Wightman's honor: 1940, 1946
- Author of Better Tennis
- Coached several women champions, including Sarah Palfrey Cooke, Helen Wills Moody, and Helen Jacobs
- Inducted into the International Tennis Hall of Fame in 1957
- Appointed as an Honorary Commander of the Order of the British Empire by Queen Elizabeth II in 1973
- Inducted into the International Women's Sports Hall of Fame in 1986
- First honoree in the University of California women's athlete hall of fame

== Career in depth ==
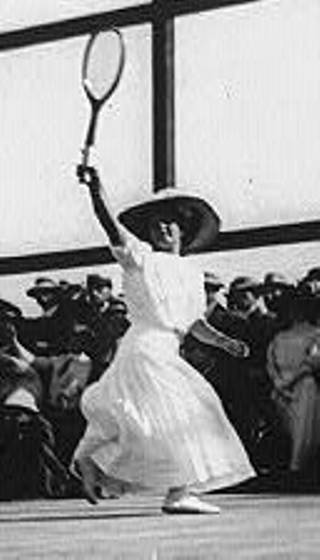

Though short in stature, Wightman anticipated and moved extremely well around a tennis court. She perfected her volleying style early, hitting the ball against the family home in Berkeley, California, where she grew up and graduated from the University of California. She refused to let the ball bounce because the yard was so uneven. She used to play against her four brothers and then the proud and spiky Sutton sisters.

Wightman was a shy, somewhat awed, and fascinated 22-year-old college girl when she arrived at the Philadelphia Cricket Club in 1909 for the U.S. Championships. She never before played on grass, but she used her attacking style and rock-ribbed volleying—she was the first woman to rely so heavily on the volley—to win the all-comers final over Louise Hammond 6–8, 6–1, 6–4 and then the title over 39-year-old Maud Barger-Wallach 6–0, 6–1. Wightman also won the women's doubles and mixed doubles titles that year.

In the 1910 Washington State Championships, Wightman won one of the few recorded "Golden Matches" in which the winner did not lose a point. She defeated a Miss Huiskamp (first name unknown).

Wightman successfully defended all three titles at the U.S. National Championships in 1910 and 1911. Wightman easily defeated Hammond in the 1910 singles final. May Sutton, an old West Coast rival and singles titlist at the U.S. Championships in 1904, pushed Wightman hard in the 1911 singles final before Wightman prevailed 8–10, 6–4, 9–7.

The most remarkable comeback in Wightman's career came at the singles final of the 1911 Niagara International Tennis Tournament against Sutton. After losing the first set 0–6 and going down 1–5 in the second, she won 12 straight games and the title 0–6, 7–5, 6–0.

In 1912, Wightman married Bostonian George Wightman and did not defend her U.S. titles. However, responding to a challenge from her father to win after becoming a mother, which would be a U.S. first, she played again in 1915, losing the singles final to Molla Bjurstedt Mallory but winning the women's doubles and mixed doubles titles. At age 32, she won her fourth singles title with the loss of only one set, beating Marion Zinderstein 6–1, 6–2 in the final. She also reached the women's doubles final. Thereafter, her success (U.S. adult titles between 1909 and 1943) was limited to doubles.

Wightman envisioned a team tournament for women similar to the Davis Cup and offered a silver vase as prize. In 1923, the British and Americans had the strongest women players. So, Julian Myrick of the United States Lawn Tennis Association decided that a U.S.-Britain competition would be in order for the Wightman Cup. The event, with Wightman captaining and playing for a winning U.S. side, opened the newly constructed stadium at Forest Hills, New York. A treasured series, it lasted through 1989, disbanding when the event was no longer competitive.

Wightman, devoted to the game in all aspects, generously instructed innumerable players at no charge throughout her life. She also teamed with two of her protégées who later joined her in the International Tennis Hall of Fame to win important titles: Wimbledon, U.S., and Olympic doubles titles with Helen Wills Moody in 1924 and U.S. Indoor women's doubles titles with Sarah Palfrey Cooke from 1928 through 1931. Her second Olympic gold medal in 1924 came in mixed doubles with Dick Williams.

The last of Wightman's record 34 U.S. adult titles was recorded in 1943 as she, 56, and Pauline Betz Addie won the women's doubles title at the U.S. Indoor Championships over Lillian Lopaus and Judy Atterbury, 7–5, 6–1.

Wightman was included in the year-end top 10 rankings issued by the United States Lawn Tennis Association in 1915, 1918, and 1919 and was the top ranked U.S. player in 1919 (rankings began in 1913).

== Grand Slam finals ==
=== Singles: 5 ( 4 titles, 1 runner-up) ===
Result	Year	Championship	Surface	Opponent	Score	Ref.
Win	1909	U.S. National Championships	Grass	(United States) Maud Barger-Wallach	6–0, 6–1	
Win	1910	U.S. National Championships	Grass	(United States) Louise Hammond Raymond	6–4, 6–2	
Win	1911	U.S. National Championships	Grass	(United States) Florence Sutton	8–10, 6–1, 9–7	
Loss	1915	U.S. National Championships	Grass	(United States) Molla Bjurstedt	6–4, 2–6, 0–6	
Win	1919	U.S. National Championships	Grass	(United States) Marion Zinderstein	6–1, 6–2	

=== Doubles: 9 (7 titles, 2 runner-ups) ===
Result	Year	Championship	Surface	Partner	Opponents	Score	Ref.
Win	1909	U.S. National Championships	Grass	(United States) Edith Rotch	(United States) Dorothy Green (Canada) Lois Moyes	6–1, 6–1	
Win	1910	U.S. National Championships	Grass	(United States) Edith Rotch	(United States) Adelaide Browning (United States) Edna Wildey	6–4, 6–4	
Win	1911	U.S. National Championships	Grass	(United States) Eleonora Sears	(United States) Dorothy Green (United States) Florence Sutton	6–4, 4–6, 6–2	
Win	1915	U.S. National Championships	Grass	(United States) Eleonora Sears	(United States) G. L. Chapman (United States) Helen Homans McLean	10–8, 6–2	
Loss	1919	U.S. National Championships	Grass	(United States) Eleonora Sears	(United States) Eleanor Goss (United States) Marion Zinderstein	8–10, 7–9	
Loss	1923	U.S. National Championships	Grass	(United States) Eleanor Goss	(United Kingdom) Phyllis Howkins Covell (United Kingdom) Kitty McKane	6–2, 2–6, 1–6	
Win	1924	Wimbledon	Grass	(United States) Helen Wills	(United Kingdom) Phyllis Howkins Covell (United Kingdom) Kitty McKane	6–4, 6–4	
Win	1924	U.S. National Championships	Grass	(United States) Helen Wills	(United States) Eleanor Goss (United States) Marion Zinderstein Jessup	6–4, 6–3	
Win	1928	U.S. National Championships	Grass	(United States) Helen Wills	(United States) Edith Cross (United States) Anna McCune Harper	6–2, 6–2	

=== Mixed doubles: 8 (6 titles, 2 runner-ups) ===
Result	Year	Championship	Surface	Partner	Opponents	Score	Ref.
Win	1909	U.S. National Championships	Grass	(United States) Wallace Johnson	(United States) Louise Hammond Raymond (United States) Raymond Little	6–2, 6–0	
Win	1910	U.S. National Championships	Grass	(United States) Joseph Carpenter	(United States) Edna Wildey (United States) Herbert M. Tilden	6–2, 6–2	
Win	1911	U.S. National Championships	Grass	(United States) Wallace Johnson	(United States) Edna Wildey (United States) Herbert M. Tilden	6–4, 6–4	
Win	1915	U.S. National Championships	Grass	(United States) Harry Johnson	(United States) Molla Bjurstedt (United States) Irving Wright	6–0, 6–1	
Win	1918	U.S. National Championships	Grass	(United States) Irving Wright	(United States) Molla Bjurstedt (United States) Fred Alexander	6–2, 6–3	
Win	1920	U.S. National Championships	Grass	(United States) Wallace Johnson	(United States) Molla Bjurstedt Mallory (United States) Craig Biddle	6–4, 6–3	
Loss	1926	U.S. National Championships	Grass	(France) René Lacoste	(United States) Elizabeth Ryan (France) Jean Borotra	4–6, 5–7	
Loss	1927	U.S. National Championships	Grass	(France) René Lacoste	(United Kingdom) Eileen Bennett (France) Henri Cochet	2–6, 6–0, 3–6	

== Grand Slam singles tournament timeline ==
Key
W	F	SF	QF	#R	RR	Q#	DNQ	A	NH

(W) winner; (F) finalist; (SF) semifinalist; (QF) quarterfinalist; (#R) rounds 4, 3, 2, 1; (RR) round-robin stage; (Q#) qualification round; (DNQ) did not qualify; (A) absent; (NH) not held; (SR) strike rate (events won / competed); (W–L) win–loss record.

Tournament	1909	1910	1911	1912 – 1914	1915	1916 – 1918	1919	1920	1921	1922	1923	1924	1925	1926	1927	1928	Career SR
Australian Championships	NH	NH	NH	NH	NH	NH	NH	NH	NH	A	A	A	A	A	A	A	0 / 0
French Championships^{*}	R	R	R	A	NH	NH	NH	A	A	A	A	NH	A	A	A	A	0 / 0
Wimbledon	A	A	A	A	NH	NH	A	A	A	A	A	3R	A	A	A	A	0 / 1
U.S. Championships	W	W	W	A	F	A	W	A	A	A	A	A	A	3R	1R	QF	4 / 8
SR	1 / 1	1 / 1	1 / 1	0 / 0	0 / 1	0 / 0	1 / 1	0 / 0	0 / 0	0 / 0	0 / 0	0 / 1	0 / 0	0 / 1	0 / 1	0 / 1	4 / 9

- R = tournament restricted to French nationals.

^{*}Through 1923, the French Championships were open only to French nationals. The World Hard Court Championships (WHCC), actually played on clay in Paris or Brussels, began in 1912 and were open to all nationalities. The results from that tournament are shown here from 1912 through 1914 and from 1920 through 1923. The Olympics replaced the WHCC in 1924, as the Olympics were held in Paris. Beginning in 1925, the French Championships were open to all nationalities, with the results shown here beginning with that year.
