= Harold Hackett =

American tennis player

- Full name: Harold Humphrey Hackett
- Country (sports): United States
- Born: July 12, 1878 Hingham, Massachusetts, U.S.
- Died: November 20, 1937 (aged 59) New York City, New York, U.S.
- Plays: Right-handed (1-handed backhand)
- Int. Tennis HoF: 1961 (member page)

Singles
- Highest ranking: No. 7 (1906 U.S. ranking)

Grand Slam singles results
- US Open: QF (1906)

Doubles

Grand Slam doubles results
- US Open: W (1907, 1908, 1909, 1910)

Harold Humphrey Hackett (July 12, 1878 – November 20, 1937) was an American tennis player.

== Biography ==
Born in Hingham, Massachusetts, but a long-time resident of New York, Hackett turned in his best results in doubles with Fred Alexander. Beginning in 1905, they were finalists at the U.S. National Championships a record seven consecutive years, winning in 1907, 1908, 1909, and 1910.

A graduate of Yale University, Hackett and Princeton University graduate Alexander won the U.S. Indoor doubles three times (1906–08), and he teamed with Walter Hall to win the U.S. Clay Court doubles title in 1912.

The following year, 1913, he was player-captain of the U.S. Davis Cup team that beat the United Kingdom in the final to win the Cup.

Hackett was ranked in the U.S. Top 10 twice: No. 9 in 1902 and at No. 7 in 1906 (when he was a U.S. quarter-finalist). He was inducted into the International Tennis Hall of Fame in 1961.

Hackett was a member of the Tennis Players' Committee who in 1915 advocated moving the National Tennis Championships from Newport, MA to Forrest Hills, NY.

In 1911, Hackett's wife divorced him for alleged acts of cruelty and that he publicly accused her of having a dozen affairs. On one occasion she said her and their two children were ill with ptomaine poisoning and Hackett was summoned immediately. Hackett arrived the following morning and only wanted to discuss their expense accounts, then quickly departed two hours later -- not to be heard from again for several months.

== Grand Slam finals ==
=== Doubles (4 titles, 3 runner-ups) ===
Result	Year	Championship	Surface	Partner	Opponents	Score
Loss	1905	U.S. Championships	Grass	(United States) Fred Alexander	(United States) Holcombe Ward (United States) Beals Wright	4–6, 4–6, 1–6
Loss	1906	U.S. Championships	Grass	(United States) Fred Alexander	(United States) Holcombe Ward (United States) Beals Wright	3–6, 6–3, 3–6, 3–6
Win	1907	U.S. Championships	Grass	(United States) Fred Alexander	(United States) Nat Thornton (United States) Bryan M. Grant	6–2, 6–1, 6–1
Win	1908	U.S. Championships	Grass	(United States) Fred Alexander	(United States) Raymond Little (United States) Beals Wright	6–1, 7–5, 6–2
Win	1909	U.S. Championships	Grass	(United States) Fred Alexander	(United States) George Janes (United States) Maurice McLoughlin	6–4, 6–4, 6–0
Win	1910	U.S. Championships	Grass	(United States) Fred Alexander	(United States) Tom Bundy (United States) Trowbridge Hendrick	6–1, 8–6, 6–3
Loss	1911	U.S. Championships	Grass	(United States) Fred Alexander	(United States) Raymond Little (United States) Gustav Touchard	5–7, 15–13, 2–6, 4–6
