= 1911 U.S. National Championships – Women's singles =

Women's singles
- 1911 U.S. National Championships

Final
- Champion: (United States) Hazel Hotchkiss
- Runner-up: (United States) Florence Sutton
- Score: 8–10, 6–1, 9–7

Details
- Draw: 41
- Seeds: –

Events
| Singles | men | women |
| Doubles | men | women |
- U.S. National Championships

Reigning champion Hazel Hotchkiss won the singles tennis title of the 1911 U.S. Women's National Singles Championship by defeating Florence Sutton 8–10, 6–1, 9–7 in the challenge round. Sutton had won the right to challenge Hotchkiss by defeating Eleonora Sears 6–2, 6–1 in the final of the All Comers' competition. The event was played on outdoor grass courts and held at the Philadelphia Cricket Club in Wissahickon Heights, Chestnut Hill, Philadelphia, from June 12 through June 17, 1911.

== Draw ==
=== Challenge round ===
| Challenge Round |
| (United States) Hazel Hotchkiss | 8 | 6 | 9 |
| (United States) Florence Sutton | 10 | 1 | 7 |

=== All Comers' finals ===
Quarterfinals
(United States) Carrie Hardy | 2 | 2
(United States) Eleonora Sears | 6 | 6
(United States) Mrs. Warren | 3 | 6 | 6
(United States) Edith Handy | 6 | 2 | 3
(United States) Florence Sutton | 6 | 6
(United States) Edna Wildey | 1 | 3
(United States) Adelaide Browning | 6 | 3 | 6
(United States) Marie Wagner | 3 | 6 | 2

Semifinals
(United States) Eleonora Sears | 6 | 6
(United States) Mrs. Warren | 1 | 3
(United States) Florence Sutton | 6 | 6
(United States) Adelaide Browning | 3 | 2

Finals
(United States) Eleonora Sears | 2 | 1
(United States) Florence Sutton | 6 | 6

| Preceded by 1911 Wimbledon Championships – Women's singles | Grand Slam women's singles | Succeeded by 1912 Wimbledon Championships – Women's singles |
