= Raymond D. Little =

American tennis player

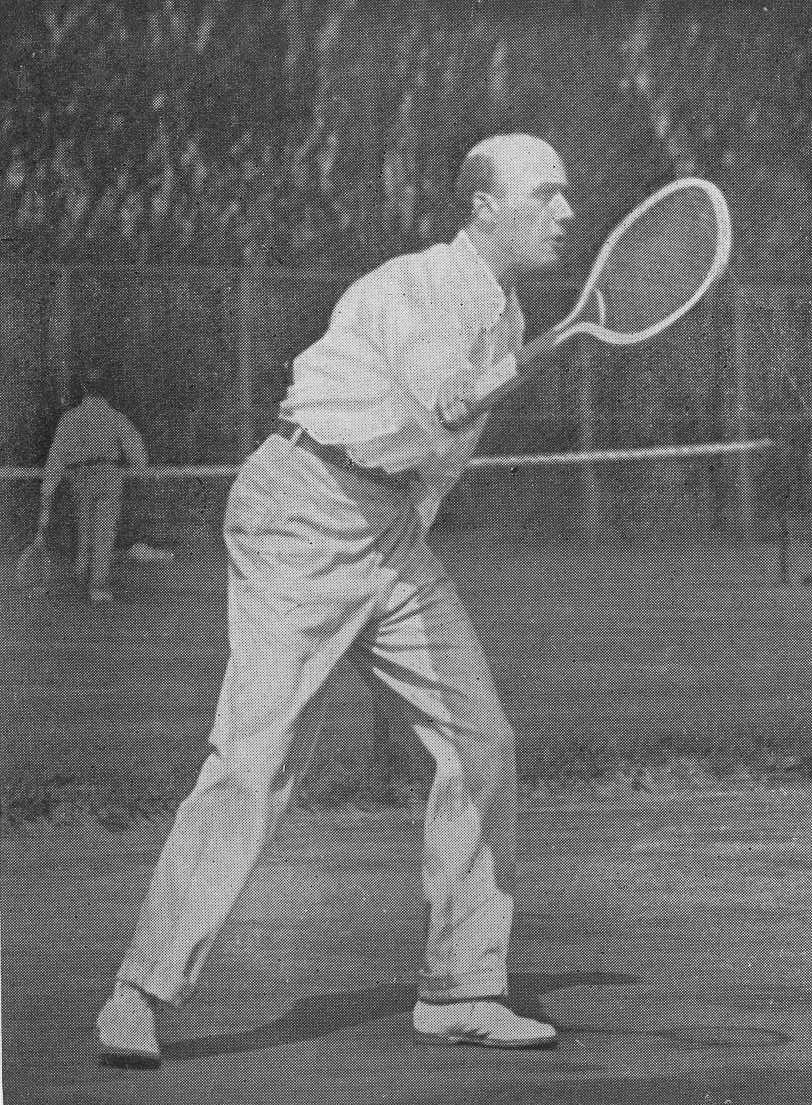
- Full name: Raymond Demorest Little
- Country (sports): United States
- Born: January 5, 1880
- Died: July 29, 1932 (aged 52) New York, NY
- Turned pro: 1897 (amateur tour)
- Retired: 1916
- Plays: Right-handed (one-handed backhand)

Grand Slam singles results
- Wimbledon: QF (1906)
- US Open: SF (1901, 1906)

Grand Slam doubles results
- Wimbledon: SF (1906)
- US Open: W (1911)

Grand Slam mixed doubles results
- US Open: W (1901)

Raymond Demorest Little (January 5, 1880 – July 29, 1932) was an American tennis player. He was ranked in the U.S. Top 10 eleven times between 1900 and 1912, his highest ranking coming in 1907 when he was ranked No. 4. He played on the United States Davis Cup team, and also won the intercollegiate tennis title for Princeton University in 1900.

== Biography ==
Little was born on January 5, 1880. His father was Joseph J. Little, an English-born Democratic Party member of Congress, publishing executive, and civil war veteran.

He attended Princeton University, where he was the president of Colonial Club. He was also captain for the Princeton Tigers men's ice hockey team in 1901.

At the Cincinnati Open, the oldest tournament in the U.S. played in its original city, Little reached 12 finals in eight appearances between 1900 and 1907: four singles finals, six doubles finals and two mixed doubles finals. In those 12 finals appearances, his only loss came in the singles final of 1903, when he was defeated by Kreigh Collins, an outstanding player out of Chicago. Little's three singles titles came in 1900, 1901 and 1902, his six doubles titles were in 1900, 1901, 1904, 1905, 1906 & 1907, and his mixed doubles titles came in 1901 with Marion Jones Farquhar and 1905 with May Sutton. He appeared in the first ever Cincinnati Open (1899) and when he played his final singles match in 1909 his singles record in Cincinnati stood at 23-5.

Little won the 1900 American intercollegiate singles tennis championship as a student at Princeton University. At the U.S. National Championships he paired with Gus Touchard to win the 1911 doubles title and reach the 1912 doubles final. He also reached the doubles final in 1900, 1904 and 1908. Little reached the semifinals of the singles in 1901 (beating William Clothier before losing to Beals Wright) and 1906 (beating Harold Hackett before losing to Karl Behr).

He died by suicide on July 29, 1932.

== Grand Slam finals ==
=== Doubles (1 title, 4 runner-ups) ===
Result	Year	Championship	Surface	Partner	Opponents	Score
Loss	1900	U.S. National Championships	Grass	(United States) Fred Alexander	(United States) Dwight F. Davis (United States) Holcombe Ward	4–6, 7–9, 10–12
Loss	1904	U.S. National Championships	Grass	(United States) Kreigh Collins	(United States) Holcombe Ward (United States) Beals Wright	6–1, 2–6, 6–3, 4–6, 1–6
Loss	1908	U.S. National Championships	Grass	(United States) Beals Wright	(United States) Fred Alexander (United States) Harold Hackett	1–6, 5–7, 2–6
Win	1911	U.S. National Championships	Grass	(United States) Gustave Touchard	(United States) Fred Alexander (United States) Harold Hackett	7–5, 13–15, 6–2, 6–4
Loss	1912	U.S. National Championships	Grass	(United States) Gustave Touchard	(United States) Tom Bundy (United States) Maurice McLoughlin	6–3, 2–6, 1–6, 5–7

=== Mixed doubles (1 title, 2 runner-ups) ===
Result	Year	Championship	Surface	Partner	Opponents	Score
Win	1901	U.S. National Championships	Grass	(United States) Marion Jones	(United States) Myrtle Rastall (United States) Clyde Stevens	6–4, 6–4, 7–5
Loss	1908	U.S. National Championships	Grass	(United States) Louise Hammond Raymond	(United States) Nathaniel Niles (United States) Edith Rotch	4–6, 6–4, 4–6
Loss	1909	U.S. National Championships	Grass	(United States) Louise Hammond Raymond	(United States) Wallace F. Johnson (United States) Hazel Hotchkiss Wightman	2–6, 0–6
