= Herbert M. Tilden =

American tennis player

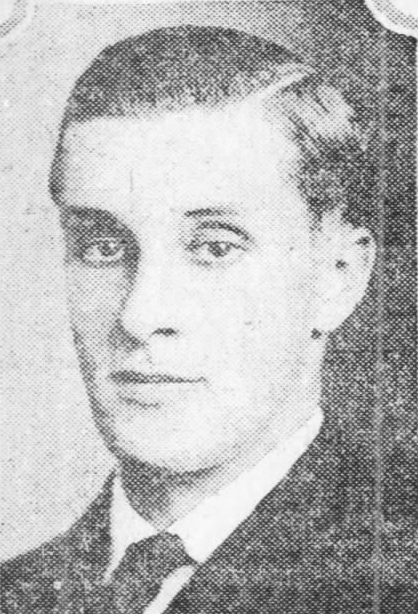
- Herbert M. Tilden
- Born: November 2, 1885
- Died: September 22, 1915 (aged 29)
- Relatives: Bill Tilden (brother)
- Tennis career
- Country (sports): United States
- College: Penn State University

Doubles

Grand Slam doubles results
- US Open: F (1907, 1910, 1911)

Herbert Marmaduke Tilden (November 2, 1885 – September 22, 1915) was an American tennis player, and elder brother of tennis champion Bill Tilden.

== Career ==
Tilden reached the final of the mixed doubles competition at the U.S. National Championships three times: in 1907, 1910, and 1911. In 1907, he partnered with Natalie Wildey and lost the final against May Sayers and Californian Wallace Johnson in two straight sets. In 1910, he teamed with Natalie's sister Edna and lost in two sets to Hazel Hotchkiss Wightman and Joseph Carpenter, Jr. His last mixed doubles came a year later, in 1911, again with Edna Wildey and they lost in two sets, this time to Hazel Hotchkiss Wightman and Wallace Johnson.

Tilden won the NCAA Collegiate doubles tennis title in 1908 with Alexander Thayer playing for Penn State University. The final required eight sets, the match was postponed at 6–6 in the fifth set due to darkness and was replayed 6–2, 5–7, 8–6, 5–7, 6–6—unfinished, 6–4, 6–3, 6–4. Tilden won the Delaware State doubles title in 1913 together with Alexander Thayer, beating George Church and A.M. Kidder in the final of the All-Comers tournament and F.C. Inman and A. Holmes in the challenge round.

Tilden was the older brother of multiple Grand Slam tournament winner Bill Tilden. Herbert Tilden died on September 22, 1915, from pneumonia.

== Grand Slam finals ==
=== Mixed doubles (3 runner-ups) ===
Result	Year	Championship	Surface	Partner	Opponents	Score
Loss	1907	U.S. National Championships	Grass	(United States) Natalie Wildey	(United States) May Sayers (United States) Wallace F. Johnson	1–6, 5–7
Loss	1910	U.S. National Championships	Grass	(United States) Edna Wildey	(United States) Hazel Hotchkiss Wightman (United States) Joseph Carpenter, Jr.	2–6, 2–6
Loss	1911	U.S. National Championships	Grass	(United States) Edna Wildey	(United States) Hazel Hotchkiss Wightman (United States) Wallace F. Johnson	4–6, 4–6
