= Florence Sutton =

American tennis player

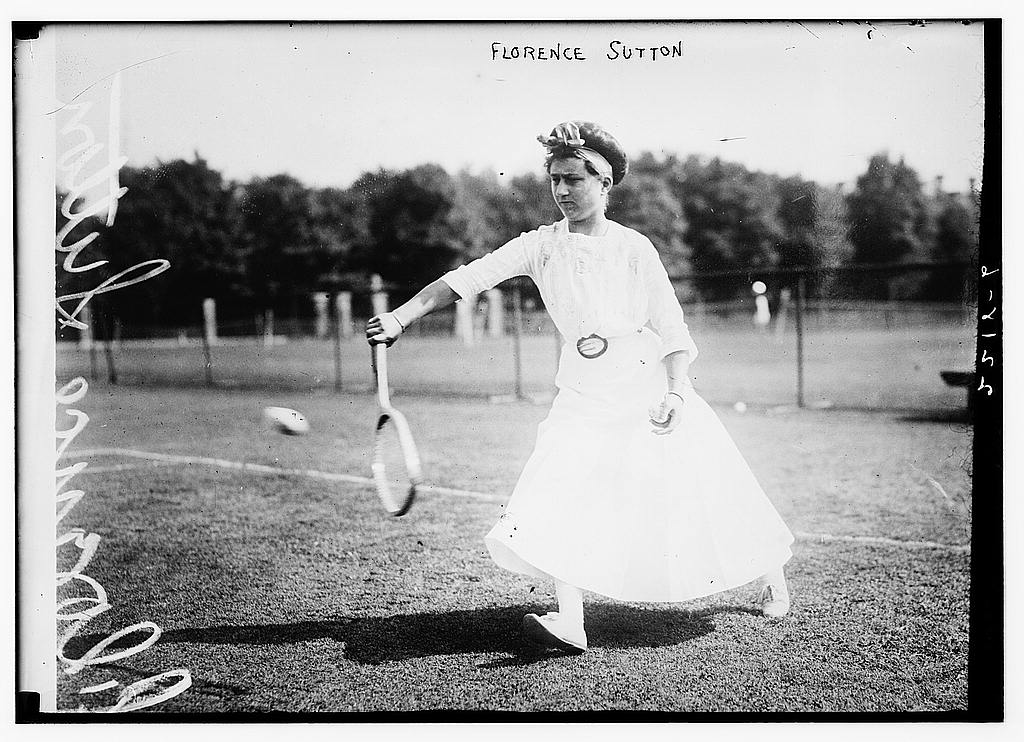
- Sutton in 1911
- Full name: Florence E. Sutton
- Country (sports): United States
- Born: September 2, 1883
- Died: October 16, 1974 (aged 91)

Singles

Grand Slam singles results
- US Open: F (1911)

Doubles

Grand Slam doubles results
- US Open: F (1911)

Florence E. Sutton (September 2, 1883 – October 16, 1974) was an American tennis player.

== Biography ==
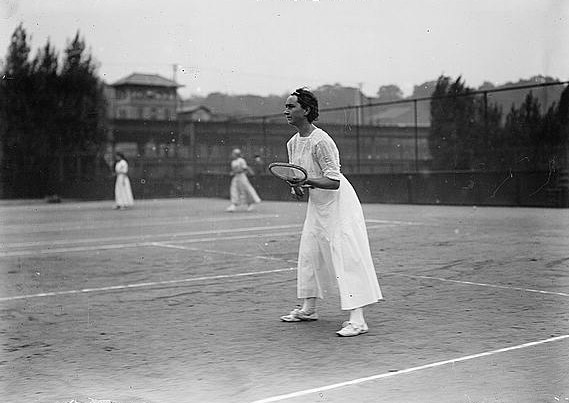
Florence Sutton

She was born on September 2, 1883, to Adolphus De Gruchy Sutton and Adelina Esther Godfray. She was the sister of tennis champion May Godfrey Sutton and the aunt of U.S. National singles champion John Doeg and Australian Championship winner Dorothy Cheney.

Sutton was a finalist for both singles and doubles titles in the US Open in 1911. In the singles final she lost Hazel Hotchkiss Wightman in three sets.

She achieved a highest national ranking of No.2 in 1914.

She also played, with her sisters May and Violet, on the Pasadena High School basketball team, which went undefeated in 1900.

In 1924, after her active playing career, she became a tennis coach at the Women's National Golf and Tennis Club in Glen Head. Sutton died on October 16, 1974.

== Grand Slam finals ==
=== Singles (1 runner-up) ===
Result	Year	Championship	Surface	Opponent	Score
Loss	1911	US National Championships	Grass	(United States) Hazel Hotchkiss	10–8, 1–6, 7–9

=== Doubles (1 runner-up) ===
Result	Year	Championship	Surface	Partner	Opponents	Score
Loss	1911	US National Championships	Grass	(United States) Dorothy Green	(United States) Hazel Hotchkiss (United States) Eleonora Sears	6–4, 4–6, 6–2

== Other significant finals ==
=== Singles (1 runner-up) ===
Result	Year	Tournament	Opponent	Score
Loss	1906	Cincinnati Open	(United States) May Sutton	5–7, 2–6

=== Doubles (1 runner-up) ===
Result	Year	Tournament	Partner	Opponents	Score
Loss	1906	Cincinnati Open	(United States) Lula Belden	(United States) May Sutton (United States) Marjorie Dodd	3–6, 6–3, 3–6
