= Louise Hammond Raymond =

American tennis player

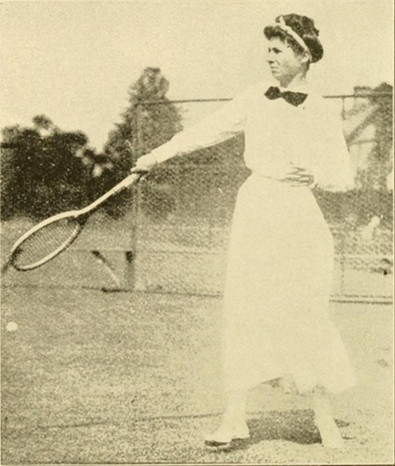
- Hammond in 1910
- Full name: Louise Ellsworth Hammond Raymond
- Country (sports): United States
- Born: December 29, 1886; New York, NY, United States
- Died: August 3, 1991 (aged 104); Scarsdale, NY, United States

Singles

Grand Slam singles results
- US Open: F (1910, 1916)

Doubles

Grand Slam doubles results
- US Open: F (1914, 1915)

Grand Slam mixed doubles results
- US Open: F (1908, 1909)

Louise Hammond Raymond (née Hammond; December 29, 1886 – August 3, 1991) was an American tennis player.

== Career ==
She reached the women's singles final of the 1910 U.S. National Championships which she lost to compatriot Hazel Hotchkiss Wightman in straight sets. She again reached the women's singles final in 1916 and this time was defeated by the Norwegian Molla Bjurstedt 0–6, 1–6 in 22 minutes. This was the shortest Grand Slam final in history.

In 1909 she reached the finals of the women's doubles at the U.S. Indoor Championships.

In 1908 and 1909 she reached the mixed doubles finals at the U.S. National Championships together with Raymond Little.

In 1910 she won the Middle States Championships after defeating Mrs. G. L. Chapman in the final round and the default of Carrie Neely in the challenge round.

In 1914 she won the Middle States Championships (Montrose, New Jersey) at the Orange Lawn Tennis Club by defeating title holder Edith Rotch in the challenge round in straight sets.

== Grand Slam finals ==
=== Singles (2 runners-up) ===
Result	Year	Championship	Surface	Opponent	Score
Loss	1910	U.S. National Championships	Grass	(United States) Hazel Hotchkiss Wightman	4–6, 2–6
Loss	1916	U.S. National Championships	Grass	(Norway) Molla Bjurstedt	0–6, 1–6

=== Doubles (2 runners-up) ===
Result	Year	Championship	Surface	Partner	Opponents	Score
Loss	1914	U.S. National Championships	Grass	(United States) Edna Wildey	(United States) Mary K. Browne (United States) Louise Riddell Williams	8–10, 2–6
Loss	1916	U.S. National Championships	Grass	(United States) Edna Wildey	(Norway) Molla Bjurstedt (United States) Eleonora Sears	6–4, 2–6, 8–10

=== Mixed doubles (2 runners-up) ===
Result	Year	Championship	Surface	Partner	Opponents	Score
Loss	1908	U.S. National Championships	Grass	(United States) Raymond D. Little	(United States) Nathaniel Niles (United States) Edith Rotch	4–6, 6–4, 4–6
Loss	1909	U.S. National Championships	Grass	(United States) Raymond D. Little	(United States) Wallace F. Johnson (United States) Hazel Hotchkiss Wightman	2–6, 0–6
