= Gustave F. Touchard =

American tennis player (1888–1918)

Gus Touchard
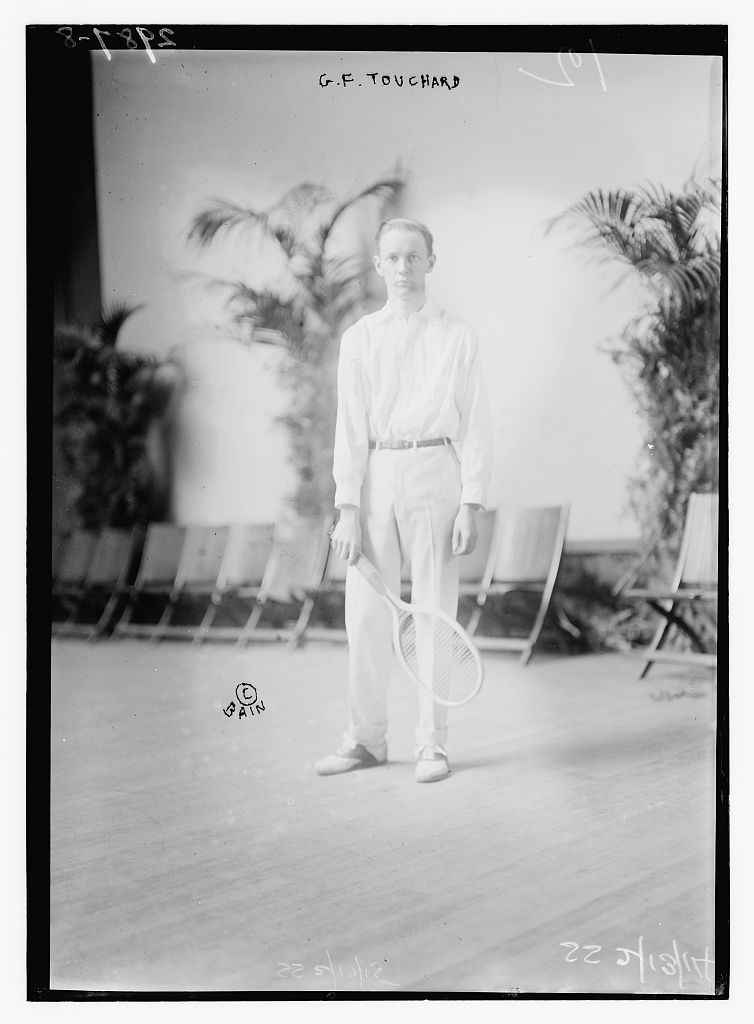
- Touchard, c. 1910–1915
- Full name: Gustave Fitzhugh Touchard Jr.
- Country (sports): United States
- Born: January 11, 1888 New York
- Died: September 5, 1918 (aged 30) Toronto, Canada
- Turned pro: 1907 (amateur tour)
- Retired: 1915

Singles
- Career record: 74–22
- Career titles: 9
- Highest ranking: No. 4 (U.S. ranking)

Grand Slam singles results
- US Open: SF (1909, 1911)

Grand Slam doubles results
- US Open: W (1911)

Gustave "Gus" Fitzhugh Touchard Jr. (or Gustav) (January 11, 1888 – September 5, 1918) was an American tennis player in the early part of the 20th century. He was ranked as high as No. 4 in the United States during his career.

== Tennis career ==
He played his first tennis tournament in 1907 at the New York Tennis Club Open where he reached the semi finals. In 1908 he reached his first final at the New York Metropolitan Championships where he was defeated by Ross Burchard.

In 1909 he went to win four singles titles that season including the Amackassin Club Invitation against Frederick Clark Inman, the Harlem Tennis Club Invitation against Wylie Grant, the Bronx County Championships against Theodore Pell, and the New York Tennis Club Open against Theodore Pell, He was also a finalist at the New England Championships the same year.

At the US Nationals, Touchard paired with Raymond D. Little to win the 1911 doubles title and reach the 1912 doubles final. At the Tri-State Championships in Cincinnati, Touchard won the 1912 singles title over Richard H. Palmer. He reached the singles final again in 1913, losing to William S. McEllroy.

He won the U.S. National Indoor Tennis Championships title three consecutive years (1913, 1914 and 1915), and won the singles title at the New Jersey State Championships in 1915. In 1912, he reached the final of the US Clay Court Championship, losing to Richard Norris Williams.

== Grand Slam finals ==
=== Doubles (1 title) ===
Result	Year	Championship	Surface	Partner	Opponents	Score
Win	1911	U.S. Championships	Grass	(United States) Raymond Little	(United States) Fred Alexander (United States) Harold Hackett	7–5, 13–15, 6–2, 6–4

== Grand Slam tournament performance timeline ==
Key
W	F	SF	QF	#R	RR	Q#	DNQ	A	NH

(W) winner; (F) finalist; (SF) semifinalist; (QF) quarterfinalist; (#R) rounds 4, 3, 2, 1; (RR) round-robin stage; (Q#) qualification round; (DNQ) did not qualify; (A) absent; (NH) not held; (SR) strike rate (events won / competed); (W–L) win–loss record.

Tournament	1908	1909	1910	1911	1912	1913	1914
Grand Slam tournaments
Australasian Championships	A	A	A	A	A	A	A
Wimbledon	A	A	A	A	A	A	A
US National Championships	QF	SF	Q1	SF	Q1	1R	QF

== Personal life ==
He was born in New York on January 11, 1888 to Gustave and Margaret McPherson Touchard.

On October 11, 1911 he married Emeline Williams Holmes. The marriage resulted in at least one child, Emlen Holmes, who was born May 24, 1914.

In July 1915, Touchard confessed to a charge of stealing 24 dozen golf balls from the sporting goods store where he was employed.

He joined the Royal Flying Corps Canada at Camp Borden after having been turned down by the United States aviation corps. He died in 1918 in Toronto General Hospital of a throat operation.
