= Fred Alexander =

American tennis player

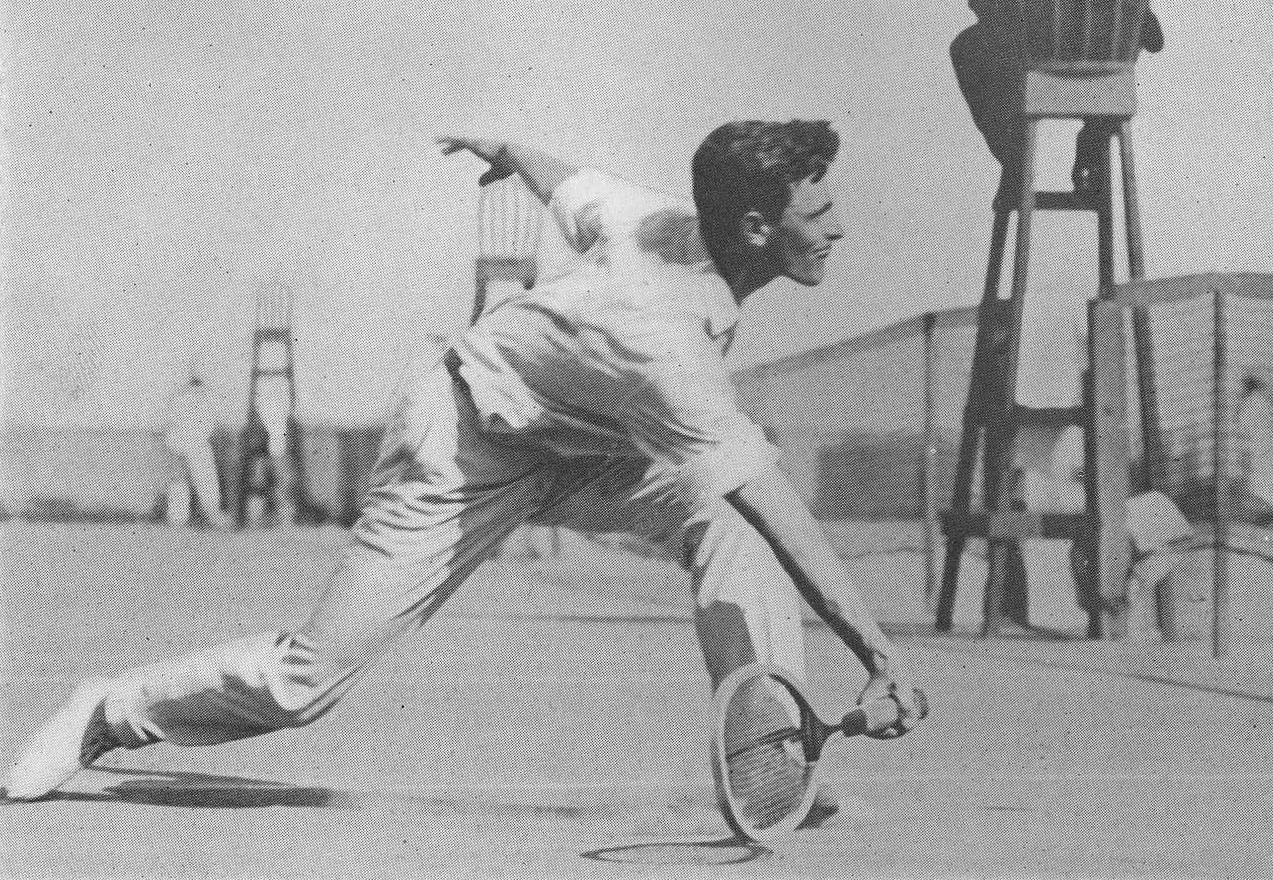
- Alexander playing a low forehand volley
- Full name: Frederick Beasley Alexander
- Country (sports): United States
- Born: August 14, 1880 Sea Bright, NJ, U.S.
- Died: March 3, 1969 (aged 88) Beverly Hills, CA, U.S.
- Turned pro: 1899 (amateur tour)
- Retired: 1920
- Plays: Right-handed (one-handed backhand)
- College: Princeton University
- Int. Tennis HoF: 1961 (member page)

Singles
- Career record: 29–11
- Highest ranking: No. 7 (1909, ITHF)

Grand Slam singles results
- Australian Open: W (1908)
- US Open: F (1908)

Doubles
- Career record: 0–0

Grand Slam doubles results
- Australian Open: W (1908)
- US Open: W (1907, 1908, 1909, 1910, 1917)

Grand Slam mixed doubles results
- US Open: F (1918)

Team competitions
- Davis Cup: F (1908^{Ch})

Frederick Beasley Alexander (August 14, 1880 – March 3, 1969) was an American tennis player in the early 20th century. He won the singles title at the 1908 Australasian Championships and six double titles at Grand Slam events.

== Career ==
In 1908, Alexander became the first foreigner to win the singles title at the Australasian/Australian Championships, the amateur precursor to the Australian Open. He then teamed with Alfred Dunlop, the man he defeated in the final, to win the doubles.

Alexander attended Princeton University and won the Intercollegiate doubles championship in 1900 and the singles in 1901. Between 1904 and 1918, he was a U.S. top 10 player six times. He was a finalist in doubles at the U.S. Championships, precursor to the US Open, seven straight times beginning in 1905. He and partner Harold Hackett won the U.S. doubles each year from 1907 to 1910. At age 37, Alexander won again in 1917, partnering with Harold Throckmorton. In the singles, Alexander reached the all comers final in 1908, beating William Clothier, then losing to Beals Wright in straight sets.

He competed in the U.S. Davis Cup team in 1908, which lost the final against Australia at the Albert Ground. Alexander lost both his singles matches against Norman Brookes and Anthony Wilding as well as the doubles match against these two with his partner Beals Wright.

In 1915, he wrote How to Play Lawn Tennis, part of the Spalding's athletic library series.

Alexander was inducted into the International Tennis Hall of Fame in 1961.

== U.S. Indoor Championships ==
- Men's Doubles champion: 1906, 1907, 1908, 1911, 1912, 1917

== Grand Slam finals ==
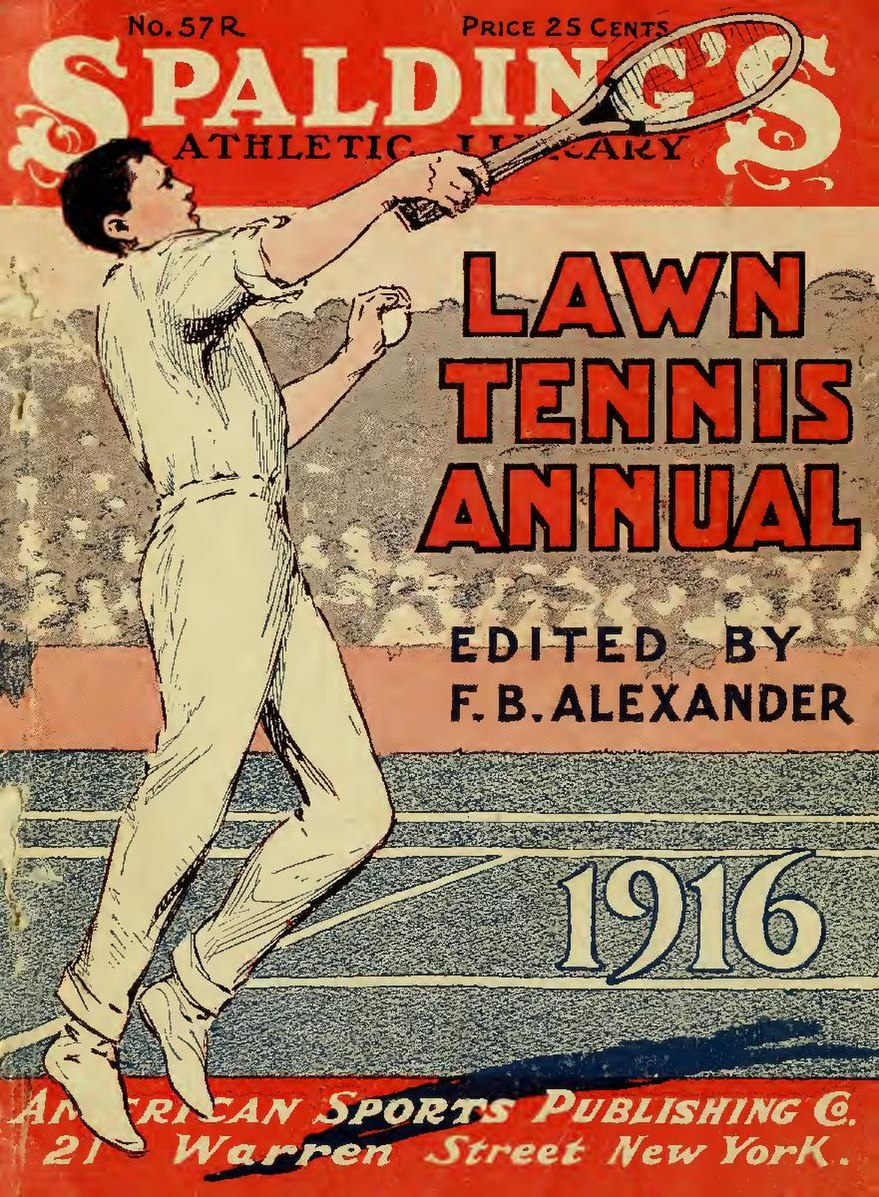
Spalding's Lawn Tennis Annual 1916 edited by Fred Alexander

=== Singles (1 title) ===
Result	Year	Championship	Surface	Opponent	Score
Win	1908	Australasian Championships	Grass	(New Zealand) Alfred Dunlop	3–6, 3–6, 6–0, 6–2, 6–3

=== Doubles (6 titles, 5 runner-ups) ===
Result	Year	Championship	Surface	Partner	Opponents	Score
Loss	1900	U.S. Championships	Grass	(United States) Raymond Little	(United States) Dwight Davis (United States) Holcombe Ward	4–6, 7–9, 10–12
Loss	1905	U.S. Championships	Grass	(United States) Harold Hackett	(United States) Holcombe Ward (United States) Beals Wright	4–6, 4–6, 1–6
Loss	1906	U.S. Championships	Grass	(United States) Harold Hackett	(United States) Holcombe Ward (United States) Beals Wright	3–6, 6–3, 3–6, 3–6
Win	1907	U.S. Championships	Grass	(United States) Harold Hackett	(United States) Nat Thornton (United States) Bryan M. Grant	6–2, 6–1, 6–1
Win	1908	Australasian Championships	Grass	(Australia) Alfred Dunlop	(Australia) G. G. Sharp (New Zealand) Anthony Wilding	6–3, 6–2, 6–1
Win	1908	U.S. Championships	Grass	(United States) Harold Hackett	(United States) Raymond Little (United States) Beals Wright	6–1, 7–5, 6–2
Win	1909	U.S. Championships	Grass	(United States) Harold Hackett	(United States) George Janes (United States) Maurice McLoughlin	6–4, 6–4, 6–0
Win	1910	U.S. Championships	Grass	(United States) Harold Hackett	(United States) Tom Bundy (United States) Trowridge Hendrick	6–1, 8–6, 6–3
Loss	1911	U.S. Championships	Grass	(United States) Harold Hackett	(United States) Raymond Little (United States) Gustav Touchard	5–7, 15–13, 2–6, 4–6
Win	1917	U.S. Championships	Grass	(United States) Harold Throckmorton	(United States) Harry Johnson (United States) Irving Wright	11–9, 6–4, 6–4
Loss	1918	U.S. Championships	Grass	(United States) Beals Wright	(United States) Vincent Richards (United States) Bill Tilden	3–6, 4–6, 6–3, 6–2, 2–6
