= Edith Rotch =

American tennis player

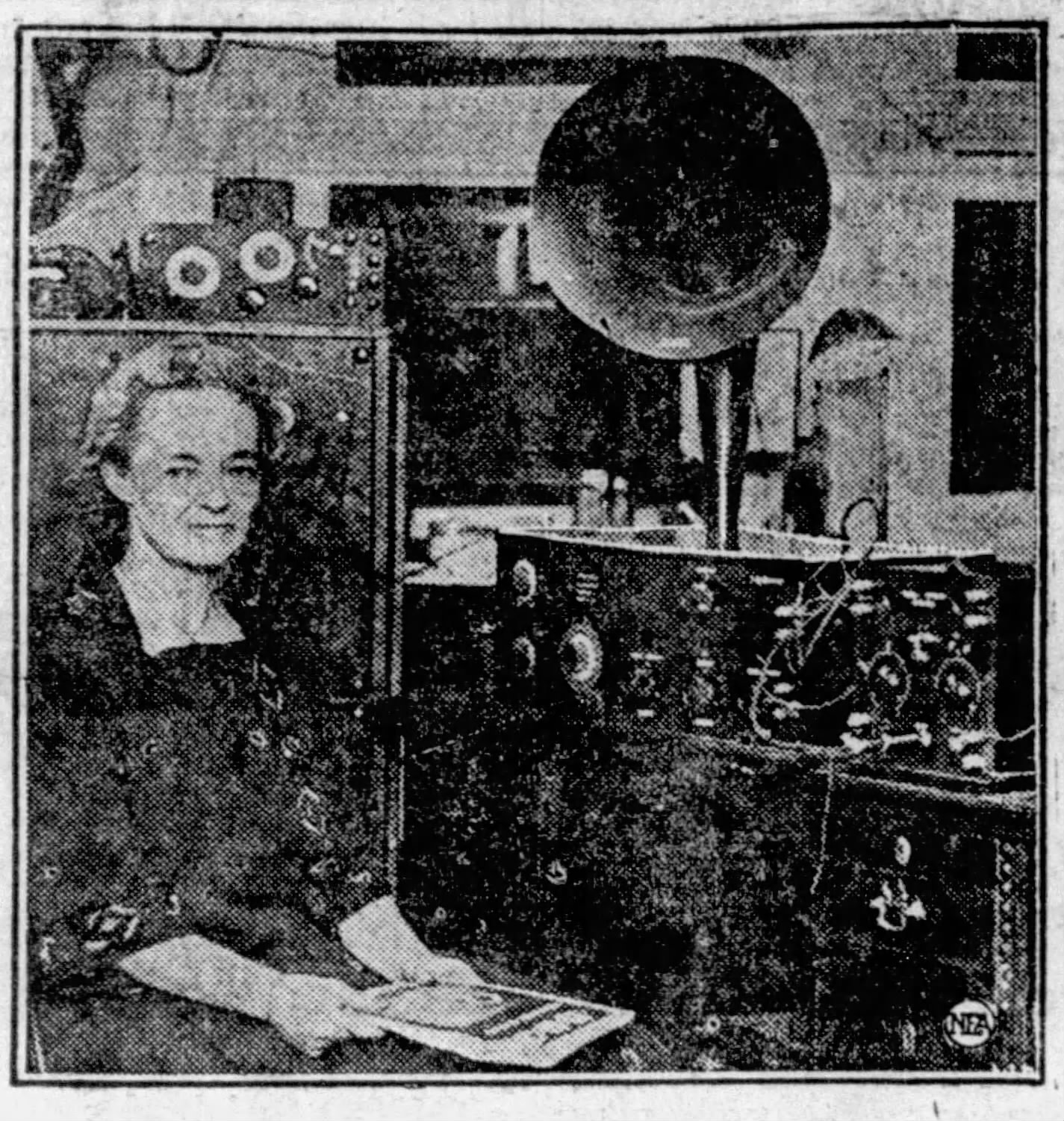
- Rotch in 1924 with radio equipment
- Full name: Edith Eliot Rotch
- Country (sports): United States
- Born: August 11, 1874
- Died: December 11, 1969 (aged 95)

Singles

Grand Slam singles results
- US Open: SF (1896)

Doubles

Grand Slam doubles results
- US Open: W (1909, 1910)

Grand Slam mixed doubles results
- US Open: W (1908)

Edith Eliot Rotch (August 11, 1874-December 11, 1969) was an American tennis player of the start of the 20th century. Born and raised in greater Boston, she was a 1901 magna cum laude graduate of Radcliffe College in Cambridge, Massachusetts. During a successful tennis career, on three occasions, she won the US Women's National Championship : in mixed doubles in 1908 (with Nathaniel Niles) and in women's doubles with Hazel Hotchkiss Wightman in 1909 and 1910. In addition to tennis, she won local trophies in ice skating. By the late 1910s, she had become active in amateur radio. Her ham call letters were 1RO, and later 1ZR. She had her own ham station and administered the licensing exam to other amateurs.

== Grand Slam finals ==
=== Doubles (2 titles) ===
Result	Year	Championship	Surface	Partner	Opponents	Score
Win	1909	U.S. National Championships	Grass	(United States) Hazel Hotchkiss	(United States) Dorothy Green (Canada) Lois Moyes	6–1, 6–1
Win	1910	U.S. National Championships	Grass	(United States) Hazel Hotchkiss	(United States) Adelaide Browning (United States) Edna Wildey	6–4, 6–4

=== Mixed doubles (1 title) ===
Result	Year	Championship	Surface	Partner	Opponents	Score
Win	1908	U.S. National Championships	Grass	(United States) Nathaniel Niles	(United States) Louise Hammond (United States) Raymond Little	6–4, 4–6, 6–4
