= 1912 in tennis =

This page covers all the important events in the sport of tennis in 1912. It provides the results of notable tournaments throughout the year on both the men's and women's ILTF tennis circuits.

== Australian Open ==
Category	Champion(s)	Finalist(s)	Score
Men's singles	(United Kingdom of Great Britain and Ireland) James Cecil Parke	(United Kingdom of Great Britain and Ireland) Alfred Beamish	3–6, 6–3, 1–6, 6–1, 7–5.
Men's doubles	(United Kingdom of Great Britain and Ireland) Charles Dixon (United Kingdom of Great Britain and Ireland) James Cecil Parke	(United Kingdom of Great Britain and Ireland) Alfred Beamish (United Kingdom of Great Britain and Ireland) Gordon Lowe	6–4, 6–4, 6–2.

== French Open ==
Not a Grand Slam event.

== Wimbledon ==
Category	Champion(s)	Finalist(s)	Score
Men's singles	(New Zealand) Anthony Wilding	(United Kingdom of Great Britain and Ireland) Arthur Gore	6–4, 6–4, 4–6, 6–4
Women's singles	(United Kingdom of Great Britain and Ireland) Ethel Larcombe	(United Kingdom of Great Britain and Ireland) Charlotte Sterry	6–3, 6–1
Men's doubles	(United Kingdom of Great Britain and Ireland) Herbert Roper Barrett (United Kingdom of Great Britain and Ireland) Charles Dixon	(France) Max Decugis (France) André Gobert	3–6, 6–3, 6–4, 7–5

== US Open ==
Category	Champion(s)	Finalist(s)	Score
Men's singles	(United States) Maurice McLoughlin	(United States) Wallace F. Johnson	3–6, 2–6, 6–2, 6–4, 6–2
Women's singles	(United States) Mary Browne	(United States) Eleonora Sears	6–4, 6–2
Men's doubles	(United States) Maurice McLoughlin (United States) Tom Bundy	(United States) Raymond Little (United States) Gustave F. Touchard	3–6, 6–2, 6–1, 7–5
Women's doubles	(United States) Mary Browne (United States) Dorothy Greene	(United States) Maud Barger-Wallach (United States) Mrs. Frederick Schmitz	6–2, 5–7, 6–0
Mixed doubles	(United States) Mary Browne (United States) R. Norris Williams	(United States) Eleonora Sears (United States) William Clothier	6–4, 2–6, 11–9
