= 1913 in tennis =

This page covers all the important events in the sport of tennis in 1913. It provides the results of notable tournaments throughout the year on both the men's and women's ILTF tennis circuits.

== Australian Open ==
Category	Champion(s)	Finalist(s)	Score
Singles	(Australia) Ernie Parker	(New Zealand) Harry Parker	2–6, 6–1, 6–3, 6–2
Doubles	(Australia) Alf Hedeman (Australia) Ernie Parker	(New Zealand) Harry Parker (Australia) Roy Taylor	8–6, 4–6, 6–4, 6–4

== French Open ==
Not a Grand Slam event.

== Wimbledon ==
Category	Champion(s)	Finalist(s)	Score
Men's singles	(New Zealand) Anthony Wilding	(United States) Maurice McLoughlin	8–6, 6–3, 10–8
Women's singles	(United Kingdom) Dorothea Lambert Chambers	(United Kingdom) Winifred McNair	6–0, 6–4
Men's doubles	(United Kingdom) Herbert Roper Barrett (United Kingdom) Charles Dixon	(Germany) Heinrich Kleinschroth (Germany) Friedrich Rahe	6–2, 6–4, 4–6, 6–2
Women's doubles	(United Kingdom) Dora Boothby' (United Kingdom) Winifred McNair	(United Kingdom) Dorothea Lambert Chambers (United Kingdom) Charlotte Sterry	4–6, 2–4 retired
Mixed doubles	(United Kingdom) Hope Crisp (United Kingdom) Agnes Tuckey	(United Kingdom) James Cecil Parke (United Kingdom) Ethel Larcombe	3–6, 5–3 retired

== US Open ==
Category	Champion(s)	Finalist(s)	Score
Men's singles	(United States) Maurice McLoughlin	(United States) R. Norris Williams	6–4, 5–7, 6–3, 6–1
Women's singles	(United States) Mary Browne	(United States) Dorothy Green	6–2, 7–5
Men's doubles	(United States) Maurice McLoughlin (United States) Tom Bundy	(United States) John Strachan (United States) Clarence Griffin	6–4, 7–5, 6–1
Women's doubles	(United States) Mary Browne (United States) Louise Riddell Williams	(United States) Dorothy Green (United States) Edna Wildey	12–10, 2–6, 6–3
Mixed doubles	(United States) Mary Browne (United States) Bill Tilden	(United States) Dorothy Green (United States) C. S. Rogers	7–5, 7–5
