= 1912 in sports =

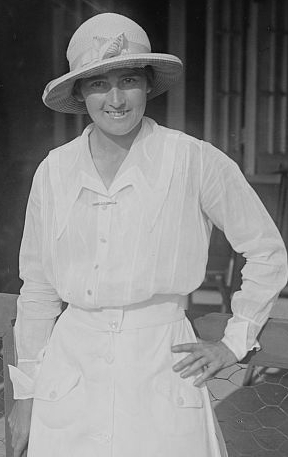
American tennis champion Mary Browne

1912 in sports describes the year's events in world sport.

== American football ==
College championship

- College football national championship – Harvard Crimson

== Association football ==
Brazil

- Santos FC, officially founded

Colombia

- Deportivo Cali, officially founded

England

- The Football League – Blackburn Rovers 49 points, Everton 46, Newcastle United 44, Bolton Wanderers 43, The Wednesday 41, Aston Villa 41
- 20 April: FA Cup final – Barnsley 1–0 West Bromwich Albion at Bramall Lane, Sheffield (replay following 0–0 draw at Crystal Palace)

Germany

- National Championship – Holstein Kiel 1–0 Karlsruher FV at Hamburg-Hoheluft

Iceland

- Iceland's premier division, now known as Landsbankadeild, is established with KR winning the inaugural title.

Scotland

- Scottish Football League – Rangers
- Scottish Cup – Celtic 2–0 Clyde at Ibrox Park

== Athletics ==
Men's 100 metres

- The first world record in the 100 metres for men is recognised by the International Amateur Athletics Federation, now known as the International Association of Athletics Federations (IAAF), after Donald Lippincott (USA) runs a time of 10.6 at Stockholm.

Men's 1500 metres

- The first world record in the 1500 metres for men is recognised by the IAAF after Abel Kiviat (USA) runs a time of 3:55.8 at Cambridge, Massachusetts.

== Australian rules football ==
AFL Premiership

- Essendon wins the 16th VFL Premiership: Essendon 5.17 (47) d South Melbourne 4.9 (33) at Melbourne Cricket Ground (MCG)

== Bandy ==
Sweden

- Championship final – IFK Uppsala 1–1 Djurgårdens IF (declared a tie; no replay played)

== Baseball ==
World Series

- 8–16 October — Boston Red Sox (AL) defeats New York Giants (NL) to win the 1912 World Series by 4 games to 3 with one tie

Events

- 20 April — Boston Red Sox open the new Fenway Park with a 7–6 11-inning win over New York Yankees before 27,000. Minutes later, the Detroit Tigers open the remodelled Navin Park (later named Tiger Stadium) with a 6–5 11-inning win over Cleveland Indians before 24,384.
- Winnipeg Maroons win the Northern League championship

== Boxing ==
Events

- 22 February — Johnny Kilbane wins the World Featherweight Championship when he defeats Abe Attell over 20 rounds at Vernon, California. Attell has held the title since 1903; Kilbane will hold it until 1923.
- 28 November — Ad Wolgast loses his World Lightweight Championship to Willie Ritchie following a 16th round foul at Colma, California. Ritchie holds the title until 1914.

Lineal world champions

- World Heavyweight Championship – Jack Johnson
- World Light Heavyweight Championship – vacant
- World Middleweight Championship – vacant
- World Welterweight Championship – vacant
- World Lightweight Championship – Ad Wolgast → Willie Ritchie
- World Featherweight Championship – Abe Attell → Johnny Kilbane
- World Bantamweight Championship – Johnny Coulon

== Canadian football ==
- The Hamilton Alerts are suspended briefly by the ORFU after refusing to replay a match against the Toronto Rowing Club
- McGill does not play in the final due to college studies
- Interprovincial Rugby Football Union - Toronto Argonauts
- Ontario Rugby Football Union - Hamilton Alerts
- Western Rugby Football Union - Regina
- Intercollegiate Rugby Football Union - McGill
- 4th Grey Cup – Hamilton Alerts defeat Toronto Argonauts 11–4

== Cricket ==
Events

- A triangular Test tournament is played in England between England, Australia and South Africa. England wins with Australia second.

England

- County Championship – Yorkshire
- Minor Counties Championship – in abeyance
- Most runs – David Denton 2127 @ 42.54 (HS 221)
- Most wickets – Colin Blythe 178 @ 12.26 (BB 8–36)
- Wisden Cricketers of the Year – no award

Australia

- Sheffield Shield – New South Wales
- Most runs – Wilfred Rhodes 1098 @ 54.90 (HS 179)
- Most wickets – Frank Foster 62 @ 20.19 (BB 7–36)

India

- Bombay Triangular – Parsees

New Zealand

- Plunket Shield – Auckland

South Africa

- Currie Cup – not contested

West Indies

- Inter-Colonial Tournament – Barbados

== Cycling ==
Tour de France

- Odile Defraye (Belgium) wins the 10th Tour de France

== Figure skating ==
World Figure Skating Championships

- World Men's Champion – Fritz Kachler (Austria)
- World Women's Champion – Opika von Méray Horváth (Hungary)
- World Pairs Champions – Phyllis Johnson / James H. Johnson (Great Britain)

== Golf ==
Major tournaments

- British Open – Ted Ray
- US Open – John McDermott

Other tournaments

- British Amateur – John Ball
- US Amateur – Jerome Travers

== Horse racing ==
England

- Grand National – Jerry M
- 1,000 Guineas Stakes – Tagalie
- 2,000 Guineas Stakes – Sweeper II
- The Derby – Tagalie
- The Oaks – Mirska
- St. Leger Stakes – Tracery

'Australia

- Melbourne Cup – Piastre

Canada

- King's Plate – Heresy

Ireland

- Irish Grand National – Small Polly
- Irish Derby Stakes – Civility

USA

- Kentucky Derby – Worth
- Preakness Stakes – Colonel Holloway
- Belmont Stakes – not contested due to anti-betting legislation in New York State

== Ice hockey ==
Stanley Cup

- Quebec Bulldogs wins the National Hockey Association (NHA) championship and the Stanley Cup. Quebec then defeats Moncton in a Cup challenge.

Events

- March — Winnipeg Victorias repeats as Allan Cup winners
- March — New Westminster Royals wins the inaugural Pacific Coast Hockey Association (PCHA) championship
- December — Toronto NHA teams, the Blueshirts and Tecumsehs, join the NHA

== Olympic Games ==
1912 Summer Olympics

- The 1912 Summer Olympics takes place in Stockholm
- First usage of electronic timing and public address systems
- Sweden wins the most medals (65) and United States the most gold medals (25)

== Rowing ==
The Boat Race

- 1 April — Oxford wins the 69th Oxford and Cambridge Boat Race

== Rugby league ==
England

- Championship – Huddersfield
- Challenge Cup final – Dewsbury 8–5 Oldham at Headingley Rugby Stadium, Leeds
- Lancashire League Championship – Wigan
- Yorkshire League Championship – Huddersfield
- Lancashire County Cup – Rochdale Hornets 12–5 Oldham
- Yorkshire County Cup – Huddersfield 22–10 Hull Kingston Rovers

International

- The Ashes are won by Australia as they defeat Great Britain 33–8 in the 3rd Test of the 1911–12 Kangaroo tour of Great Britain at Villa Park before a crowd of 4,000.
- 1912 New Zealand rugby league tour of Australia

Australia

- NSW Premiership – Eastern Suburbs (outright winner)

== Rugby union ==
Five Nations Championship

- 30th Five Nations Championship series is shared by England and Ireland

== Speed skating ==
Speed Skating World Championships

- Men's All-round Champion – Oscar Mathisen (Norway)

== Tennis ==
Australia

- Australian Men's Singles Championship – James Cecil Parke (GC) defeats Alfred Beamish (GB) 3–6 6–3 1–6 6–1 7–5

England

- Wimbledon Men's Singles Championship – Anthony Wilding (New Zealand) defeats Arthur Gore (GB) 6–4 6–4 4–6 6–4
- Wimbledon Women's Singles Championship – Ethel Thomson Larcombe (GB) defeats Charlotte Cooper Sterry (GB) 6–3 6–1

France

- French Men's Singles Championship – Max Decugis (France) defeats André Gobert (France): details unknown
- French Women's Singles Championship – Jeanne Matthey (France) defeats Marie Danet (France): details unknown

USA

- American Men's Singles Championship – Maurice McLoughlin (USA) defeats Wallace Johnson (USA) 3–6 2–6 6–2 6–4 6–2
- American Women's Singles Championship – Mary Browne (USA) defeats Eleonora Sears (USA) 6–4 6–2

Davis Cup

- 1912 International Lawn Tennis Challenge – British Isles 3–2 Australasia at Albert Ground (grass) Melbourne, Australia
