= 1913 U.S. National Championships – Women's singles =

Women's singles
- 1913 U.S. National Championships

Final
- Champion: (United States) Mary Browne
- Runner-up: (United States) Dorothy Green
- Score: 6–2, 7–5

Details
- Draw: 37
- Seeds: –

Events
Singles	men	women
Doubles	men	women
- U.S. National Championships

Reigning champion Mary Browne won the singles tennis title of the 1913 U.S. Women's National Singles Championship by defeating Dorothy Green 6–2, 7–5 in the challenge round. Green had won the right to challenge Browne by defeating Edna Wildey 6–3, 6–4 in the final of the All Comers' competition. The event was played on outdoor grass courts and held at the Philadelphia Cricket Club in Wissahickon Heights, Chestnut Hill, Philadelphia in the United States, from June 9 through June 14, 1913.

== Draw ==
=== Challenge round ===
Challenge Round
(United States) Mary Browne	6	7
(United States) Dorothy Green	2	5

=== All Comers' finals ===
Quarterfinals
(United States) Marion Crasswell	0	2
(United States) Edna Wildey	6	6
(United States) Mrs. H.J.D. Paul	2	6	7
(United States) Flora Brown Harvey	6	3	5
(United States) Dorothy Green	6	6
(United States) Mrs. Herold	4	2
(United States) Helen Alexander	0	6	2
(United States) Louise Riddell Williams	6	4	6

Semifinals
(United States) Edna Wildey	6	6
(United States) Mrs. H.J.D. Paul	1	2
(United States) Dorothy Green	7	6
(United States) Louise Riddell Williams	5	3

Finals
(United States) Edna Wildey	3	4
(United States) Dorothy Green	6	6

Preceded by 1912 Wimbledon Championships – Women's singles	Grand Slam women's singles	Succeeded by 1913 Wimbledon Championships – Women's singles
