= 1912 U.S. National Championships (tennis) =

- Date: August 19–26 (M); June 10–15 (W)
- Edition: 32nd
- Category: Grand Slam
- Surface: Grass (outdoor)
- Location: Newport, R.I., United States (M); Philadelphia, PA, United States (W)
- Venue: Newport Casino (M); Philadelphia Cricket Club (W)

Champions

Men's singles
- (United States) Maurice McLoughlin

Women's singles
- (United States) Mary Browne

Men's doubles
- (United States) Maurice McLoughlin / (United States) Tom Bundy

Women's doubles
- (United States) Dorothy Green / (United States) Mary Browne

Mixed doubles
- (United States) Mary Browne / (United States) R. Norris Williams
← 1911 ·	U.S. National Championships	· 1913 →

The 1912 U.S. National Championships (now known as the US Open) took place on the outdoor grass courts at the Newport Casino in Newport, Rhode Island. The men's singles tournament ran from August 19 until August 26 while the women's singles and doubles championship took place from June 10 to June 15 at the Philadelphia Cricket Club in Chestnut Hill. It was the 32nd staging of the U.S. National Championships, and the second Grand Slam tennis event of the year. The challenge round was abolished in this edition, thus requiring all participants, including the defending champion, to play the main draw.

== Finals ==
=== Men's singles ===
(United States) Maurice McLoughlin defeated (United States) Wallace F. Johnson 3–6, 2–6, 6–2, 6–4, 6–2

=== Women's singles ===
(United States) Mary Browne defeated (United States) Eleonora Sears 6–4, 6–2

=== Men's doubles ===
(United States) Maurice McLoughlin / (United States) Tom Bundy defeated (United States) Raymond Little / (United States) Gustave F. Touchard 3–6, 6–2, 6–1, 7–5

=== Women's doubles ===
(United States) Mary Browne / (United States) Dorothy Greene defeated (United States) Maud Barger-Wallach / (United States) Mrs. Frederick Schmitz 6–2, 5–7, 6–0

=== Mixed doubles ===
(United States) Mary Browne / (United States) R. Norris Williams defeated (United States) Eleonora Sears / (United States) William Clothier 6–4, 2–6, 11–9

Preceded by 1912 Wimbledon Championships	Grand Slams	Succeeded by 1912 Australasian Championships
