= 1913 U.S. National Championships (tennis) =

- Date: August 18–26 (M); June 9–14 (W)
- Edition: 33rd
- Category: Grand Slam
- Surface: Gras
- Location: Newport, R.I., United States (M); Philadelphia, PA, United States (W)
- Venue: Newport Casino (M); Philadelphia Cricket Club (W)

Champions

Men's singles
- (United States) Maurice McLoughlin

Women's singles
- (United States) Mary Browne

Men's doubles
- (United States) Maurice McLoughlin / (United States) Tom Bundy

Women's doubles
- (United States) Mary Browne / (United States) Louise Riddell Williams

Mixed doubles
- (United States) Mary Browne / (United States) Bill Tilden
- U.S. National Championships

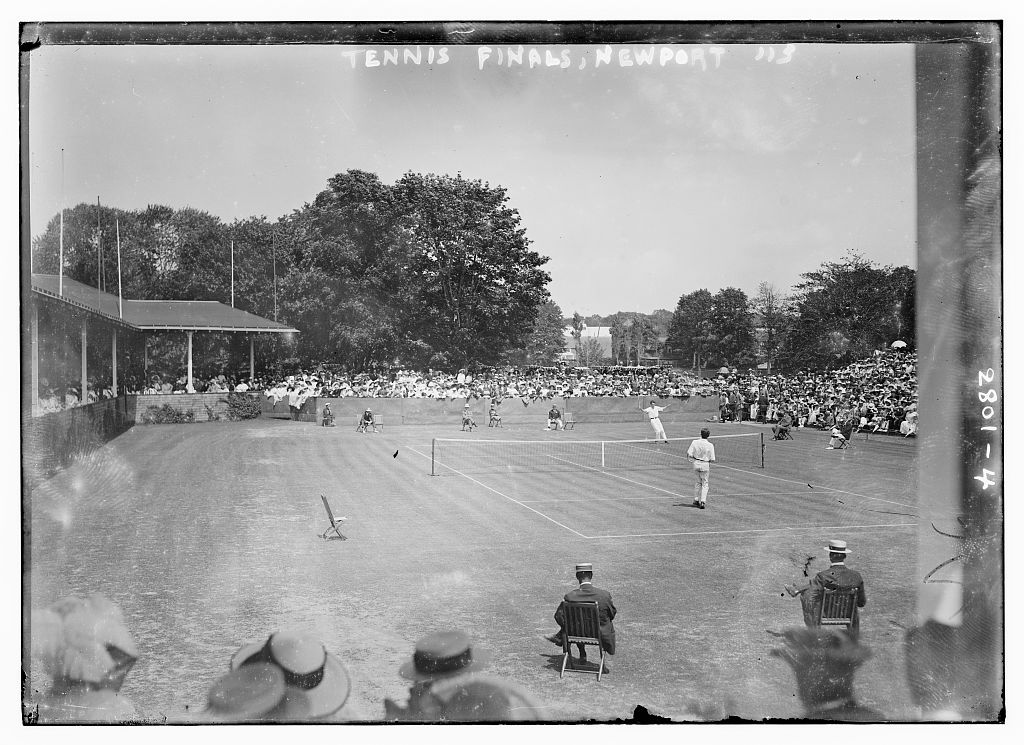
1913 men's final at Newport - McLoughlin serving

The 1913 U.S. National Championships (now known as the US Open) took place on the outdoor grass courts at the Newport Casino in Newport, Rhode Island. The men's singles tournament ran from August 18 until August 26 while the women's singles and doubles championship took place from June 9 to June 14 at the Philadelphia Cricket Club in Chestnut Hill. It was the 33rd staging of the U.S. National Championships, and the second Grand Slam tennis event of the year. Future seven-time singles champion Bill Tilden won his first U.S. Championship title, partnering Mary Browne in the mixed doubles.

== Finals ==
=== Men's singles ===
(United States) Maurice McLoughlin defeated (United States) R. Norris Williams 6–4, 5–7, 6–3, 6–1

=== Women's singles ===
(United States) Mary Browne defeated (United States) Dorothy Green 6–2, 7–5

=== Men's doubles ===
(United States) Maurice McLoughlin / (United States) Tom Bundy defeated (United States) John Strachan / (United States) Clarence Griffin 6–4, 7–5, 6–1

=== Women's doubles ===
(United States) Mary Browne / (United States) Louise Riddell Williams defeated (United States) Dorothy Green / (United States) Edna Wildey 12–10, 2–6, 6–3

=== Mixed doubles ===
(United States) Mary Browne / (United States) Bill Tilden defeated (United States) Dorothy Green / (United States) C. S. Rogers 7–5, 7–5

Preceded by 1913 Wimbledon Championships	Grand Slams	Succeeded by 1913 Australasian Championships
