= 1914 U.S. National Championships (tennis) =

- Date: August 24 – September 1 (M); June 8 – 13 (W)
- Edition: 34th
- Category: Grand Slam
- Surface: Grass (outdoor)
- Location: Newport, R.I., United States (M); Philadelphia, PA, United States (W)
- Venue: Newport Casino (M); Philadelphia Cricket Club (W)

Champions

Men's singles
- (United States) R. Norris Williams

Women's singles
- (United States) Mary Browne

Men's doubles
- (United States) Maurice McLoughlin / (United States) Tom Bundy

Women's doubles
- (United States) Mary Browne / (United States) Louise Riddell Williams

Mixed doubles
- (United States) Mary Browne / (United States) Bill Tilden
- U.S. National Championships

The 1914 U.S. National Championships (now known as the US Open) took place on the outdoor grass courts at the Newport Casino in Newport, Rhode Island. The men's singles tournament ran from August 24 until September 1 while the women's singles and doubles championship took place from June 8 to June 13 at the Philadelphia Cricket Club in Chestnut Hill. It was the 34th staging of the U.S. National Championships, and the second Grand Slam tennis event of the year. It was the final edition of the national championships held at the Newport Casino in Newport, Rhode Island before relocation to the West Side Tennis Club at Forest Hills, New York.

Participation in the tournament was affected by the outbreak of World War I. The 1914 Wimbledon finalists Norman Brookes and Anthony Wilding had won the Davis Cup for Australasia two weeks before the tournament, defeating the United States team in the challenge round played at the West Side Tennis Club in New York. Both players were entered for the U.S. National Championships but withdrew and returned to England.

== Finals ==
=== Men's singles ===
(United States) R. Norris Williams defeated (United States) Maurice McLoughlin 6–3, 8–6, 10–8

=== Women's singles ===
(United States) Mary Browne defeated (United States) Marie Wagner 6–2, 1–6, 6–1

=== Men's doubles ===
(United States) Maurice McLoughlin / (United States) Tom Bundy defeated (United States) George Church / (United States) Dean Mathey 6–4, 6–2, 6–4

=== Women's doubles ===
(United States) Mary Browne / (United States) Louise Riddell Williams defeated (United States) Louise Hammond Raymond / (United States) Edna Wildey 10–8, 6–2

=== Mixed doubles ===
(United States) Mary Browne / (United States) Bill Tilden defeated (United States) Margarette Myers / (United States) J. R. Rowland 6–1, 6–4

Preceded by 1914 Wimbledon Championships	Grand Slams	Succeeded by 1914 Australasian Championships
