= Elia Fottrell =

American tennis player

- Full name: Elia Francis Fottrell
- Country (sports): United States
- Born: February 3, 1893; California, United States
- Died: September 15, 1974 (aged 81); San Mateo, California, United States
- Turned pro: 1913 (amateur tour)
- Retired: 1916

Singles

Grand Slam singles results
- US Open: SF (1914)

Elia Fottrell (1893–1974) was an American tennis player. He was from California. He was ambidextrous and could play with the racket in either hand. Fottrell reached the semifinals in the 1914 U.S. Championships singles, beating Nat Niles and Gus Touchard before losing easily to R. Norris Williams.
