= 1914 U.S. National Championships – Women's singles =

Women's singles
- 1914 U.S. National Championships

Final
- Champion: (United States) Mary Browne
- Runner-up: (United States) Marie Wagner
- Score: 6–2, 1–6, 6–1

Details
- Draw: 46
- Seeds: –

Events
Singles	men	women
Doubles	men	women
- U.S. National Championships

Reigning champion Mary Browne won the singles tennis title of the 1914 U.S. Women's National Singles Championship by defeating Marie Wagner 6–2, 1–6, 6–1 in the challenge round. It was Browne's third successive singles title. Wagner had won the right to challenge Browne by defeating Clare Cassel 6–3, 6–4 in the final of the All Comers' competition. The event was played on outdoor grass courts and held at the Philadelphia Cricket Club in Wissahickon Heights, Chestnut Hill, Philadelphia in the United States, from June 8 through June 13, 1914.

== Draw ==
=== Challenge round ===
Challenge Round
(United States) Mary Browne	6	1	6
(United States) Marie Wagner	2	6	1

=== All Comers' finals ===
Quarterfinals
(United States) Marie Wagner	6	6
(United States) Carrie Neely	2	3
(United States) Louise Raymond	4	6	6
(United States) Connie Sullivan	6	2	1
(United States) Isabel Pendleton	6	6
(United States) Margaretta Myers	2	1
(United States) Ann Sheafe	6	4	1
(United States) Clare Cassel	4	6	6

Semifinals
(United States) Marie Wagner	6	6
(United States) Louise Raymond	4	4
(United States) Isabel Pendleton	1	2
(United States) Clare Cassel	6	6

Finals
(United States) Marie Wagner	6	7
(United States) Clare Cassel	1	5

Preceded by 1914 Wimbledon Championships – Women's singles	Grand Slam women's singles	Succeeded by 1915 Wimbledon Championships – Women's singles
