= 1921 U.S. National Championships (tennis) =

- Date: September 9–19 (M); August 15–20 (W)
- Edition: 41st
- Category: Grand Slam (ITF)
- Surface: Grass
- Location: Philadelphia, Pennsylvania, US (MS); Forest Hills, New York, US (WS, WD); Chestnut Hill, Massachusetts (MD, XD)
- Venue: Germantown Cricket Club (MS); West Side Tennis Club (WS, WD); Longwood Cricket Club (MD, XD)

Champions

Men's singles
- (United States) Bill Tilden

Women's singles
- (United States) Molla Bjurstedt Mallory

Men's doubles
- (United States) Bill Tilden / (United States) Vincent Richards

Women's doubles
- (United States) Mary Browne / (United States) Louise Riddell Williams

Mixed doubles
- (United States) Mary Browne / (United States) Bill Johnston
- U.S. National Championships

The 1921 U.S. National Championships (now known as the US Open) was a tennis tournament that took place on the outdoor grass courts at three locations in the United States. The men's singles event was held from September 9 until September 19 at the Germantown Cricket Club in Philadelphia, while the women's singles and doubles events were held from August 15 until August 20 at the West Side Tennis Club in Forest Hills, New York. The men's and mixed doubles competitions took place at Longwood Cricket Club in Chestnut Hill, Massachusetts. It was the 41st staging of the U.S. National Championships and the second Grand Slam tennis event of the year.

Although Molla Bjurstedt Mallory won the women's singles event for the sixth time in seven years, her victory was overshadowed by her second-round win over Suzanne Lenglen, who was making her only ever competitive appearance in the United States. Lenglen retired from the match after losing the first set, the only competitive loss of her career after World War I.

== Finals ==
=== Men's singles ===
(United States) Bill Tilden defeated (United States) Wallace F. Johnson 6–1, 6–3, 6–1

=== Women's singles ===
(United States) Molla Bjurstedt Mallory defeated (United States) Mary Browne 4–6, 6–4, 6–2

=== Men's doubles ===
(United States) Bill Tilden / (United States) Vincent Richards defeated (United States) Richard Norris Williams / (United States) Watson Washburn 13–11, 12–10, 6–1

=== Women's doubles ===
(United States) Mary Browne / (United States) Louise Riddell Williams defeated (United States) Helen Gilleaudeau / (United States) Aletta Bailey Morris 6–3, 6–2

=== Mixed doubles ===
(United States) Mary Browne / (United States) Bill Johnston defeated (United States) Molla Bjurstedt Mallory / (United States) Bill Tilden 3–6, 6–4, 6–3

Preceded by 1921 Wimbledon Championships	Grand Slams	Succeeded by 1921 Australasian Championships
