= 1914 U.S. National Championships – Men's singles =

Men's singles
- 1914 U.S. National Championships

Final
- Champion: (United States) R. Norris Williams
- Runner-up: (United States) Maurice McLoughlin
- Score: 6–3, 8–6, 10–8

Events
Singles	men	women
Doubles	men	women
← 1913 ·	U.S. National Championships	· 1915 →

Richard Norris Williams defeated Maurice McLoughlin 6–3, 8–6, 10–8 in the final to win the men's singles tennis title at the 1914 U.S. National Championships. The event was held at the Newport Casino in Newport, R.I. in the United States. There were more than 128 players in the draw.

== Final eight ==
Quarterfinals
(United States) Gus Touchard	1	1	2
(United States) Elia Fottrell	6	6	6
(United States) R. Norris Williams	6	6	7
(United States) Karl Behr	1	2	5
(United States) William Clothier	6	9	6
(United States) Wallace F. Johnson	2	7	1
(United States) Clarence Griffin	1	4	6	6
(United States) Maurice McLoughlin	6	6	3	8

Semifinals
(United States) Elia Fottrell	4	3	2
(United States) R. Norris Williams	6	6	6
(United States) William Clothier	4	4	3
(United States) Maurice McLoughlin	6	6	6

Final
(United States) R. Norris Williams	6	8	10
(United States) Maurice McLoughlin	3	6	8

== Earlier rounds ==
1st round - B. Wagner (United States) d. (United States) G. Wrenn 7-5,7-5,6-1
G. Achelis (United States) d. (United States) E. Stille 6-1,6-0,6-4
L. Tailer (United States) d. (United States) J. Waterbury 3-6,6-3,6-3,6-2
J. Geary (United States) d. (United States) F. Magoun 6-0,6-8,7-9,6-1,9-7
H. MacKinney (United States) d. (United States) R. Gatewood w/o
L. Beekman (United States) d. (United States) A. Kidder 13-11,8-6,4-4 rtd.
J. Devereux (United States) d. (United States) C. Beck 6-3,6-0,6-1
F. Marden (United States) d. (United States) R. Palmer w/o
F. Frelinghuysen (United States) d. (United States) H. Webber 4-6,6-3,6-0,6-4
R. Little (United States) d. (United States) W. Blair 6-2,6-2,6-3

2nd round - B. Hoppin (United States) d. (United States) F. Budlong w/o
H. Johnson (United States) d. (United States) J. Carpenter 6-3,6-3,6-1
F. Inman (United States) d. (United States) L. Hobbs 6-3,6-1,6-4
D. Cunningham (United States) d. (United States) N. Johnson 6-1,7-5,6-1
E. Whitney (United States) d. (United States) R. Weeden 6-1,6-1,6-3
W. Heyl (United States) d. (United States) J. Jackson 6-1,6-3,6-2
G. Touchard (United States) d. (United States) E. Torrey 6-1,6-1,6-2
W. Pate (United States) d. (United States) R. Rowell w/o
G. Roberts (United States) d. (United States) L. Jennings 6-8,6-3,6-2,6-0
E. Fottrell (United States) d. (United States) A. Phillips w/o
H. Simmonds (United States) d. (United States) S. Hoffman w/o
C. Childs (United States) d. (United States) K. Stern 6-2,6-4,7-5
D. Mathey (United States) d. (United States) V. Astor w/o
J. Brown (United States) d. (United States) A. Watters 6-0,6-1,6-0
N. Niles (United States) d. (United States) D. Watters 6-3,7-5,6-2
G. Humphreys (United States) d. (United States) R. Swain w/o
J. Hubbard (United States) d. (Australia) N. Brookes w/o
S. Thayer (United States) d. (United States) W. Rosenbaum 4-6,6-2,4-6,6-3,6-4
A. Sands (United States) d. (United States) J. Cushman w/o
C. Major (United States) d. (United States) F. Roche 6-1,4-6,6-1 rtd.
R. N. Williams (United States) d. (United States) H. Schmidt w/o
W. Johnston (United States) d. (United States) C. Bull 6-3,6-3,6-4
A. Dabney (United States) d. (United States) D. Josephs 6-2,6-2,10-8
H. Voshell (United States) d. (United States) A. Champlin 6-1,6-2,6-1
R. LeRoy (United States) d. (United States) G. Lyon 6-1,6-0,6-1
W. Phillips (United States) d. (United States) A. Chouteau 8-6,6-0,6-4
O. Sweet (United States) d. (United States) J. Gignoux w/o
K. Behr (United States) d. (United States) N. Vose 6-2,6-0,6-1
R. L. Murray (United States) d. (United States) F. Paul w/o
B. Wagner (United States) d. (United States) R. Stevenson 6-1,6-4,6-3
G. Achelis (United States) d. (United States) L. Tailer 6-2,6-1,6-0
H. MacKinney (United States) d. (United States) J. Geary 6-1,6-1,6-1
L. Beekman (United States) d. (United States) J. Devereux 6-1,6-1,6-2
F. Frelinghuysen (United States) d. (United States) F. Marden 6-2,6-0,6-2
R. Little (United States) d. (United States) R. Sailer 6-1,6-0,6-2
W. Clothier (United States) d. (United States) C. Watson w/o
H. Throckmorton (United States) d. (United States) J. Randolph 6-2,11-9,6-3
R. Seaver (United States) d. (United States) L. Causey 6-0,6-2,6-1
W. Washburn (United States) d. (United States) B. Law 6-2,6-4,4-6,6-4
R. Harte (United States) d. (United States) W. Wright 6-1,6-2,6-3
H. Owen (United States) d. (United States) W. Bourne 4-6,6-3,6-3,6-1
K. Robottom (United States) d. (United States) C. Sherman 10-8,2-6,6-2,6-4
T. Pell (United States) d. (United States) G. Church w/o
G. Groesbeck (United States) d. (United States) F. Hopkins 6-4,5-7,6-4,6-3
R. C. Thomas (United States) d. (New Zealand) A. Wilding w/o
H. Harvey (United States) d. (United States) G. Boyd w/o
W. Johnson (United States) d. (United States) J. Bruns 6-1,6-2,6-2
L. Curtis (United States) d. (United States) C. Craigin 6-4,6-4 rtd.
C. Griffin (United States) d. (United States) W. Brownell 6-1,6-3,6-3
J. Thomas (United States) d. (United States) B. Yonine 6-1,6-2,6-0
A. Hammett (United States) d. (United States) C. Wistar 6-0,6-1,6-1
A. Fox (United States) d. (United States) G. Beals 6-3,2-6,2-6,6-2,6-1
E. Morgan (United States) d. (United States) W. Larned w/o
R. Stevens (United States) d. (United States) C. Landers 6-2,6-0,6-1
E. McCormick (United States) d. (United States) S. Merrihew 7-5,6-0,6-1
G. Gardner (United States) d. (United States) E. Swift 6-2,6-1,6-3
C. Smith (United States) d. (United States) H. Nickerson w/o
M. McLoughlin (United States) d. (United States) H. Sturdy 6-1,6-2,6-2
L. Cooper (United States) d. (United States) R. Maynard w/o
I. Wright (United States) d. (United States) W. Hall 6-3,6-4,6-8,6-4
R. Hazard (United States) d. (United States) V. Miner 6-3,4-6,6-3,6-2
E. Pearson (United States) d. (United States) E. Carey 6-1,6-0,6-1
P. Wright (United States) d. (United States) R. Brown w/o
E. Gould (United States) d. (United States) W. Roberts w/o

3rd round - H. Johnson (United States) d. (United States) B. Hoppin 6-0,6-3,6-0
F. Inman (United States) d. (United States) D. Cunningham 6-0,6-1,6-4
E. Whitney (United States) d. (United States) W. Heyl 6-0,6-1,6-1
G. Touchard (United States) d. (United States) W. Pate 6-2,6-2,6-3
E. Fottrell (United States) d. (United States) G. Roberts 6-4,6-2,4-6,6-1
C. Childs (United States) d. (United States) H. Simmonds 6-0,6-4,6-1
D. Mathey (United States) d. (United States) J. Brown 6-3,7-5,6-0
N. Niles (United States) d. (United States) G. Humphreys 6-0,6-0,6-1
S. Thayer (United States) d. (United States) J. Hubbard 6-0,6-1,6-3
C. Major (United States) d. (United States) A. Sands 7-5,7-9,6-4,7-9,6-4
R. N. Williams (United States) d. (United States) W. Johnston 9-7,3-6,6-3,6-3
A. Dabney (United States) d. (United States) H. Voshell 6-3,16-14,6-8,3-6,8-6
R. LeRoy (United States) d. (United States) W. Phillips 6-4,6-4,6-2
K. Behr (United States) d. (United States) O. Sweet 6-0,6-3,6-1
R. L. Murray (United States) d. (United States) B. Wagner 6-1,6-1,6-3
H. MacKinney (United States) d. (United States) G. Achelis 6-3,6-1,6-3
L. Beekman (United States) d. (United States) F. Frelinghuysen 6-2,6-3,6-2
W. Clothier (United States) d. (United States) R. Little 6-0,6-0,6-0
H. Throckmorton (United States) d. (United States) R. Seaver 2-6,6-2,6-3,4-6,6-3
W. Washburn (United States) d. (United States) R. Harte 1-6,6-3,7-5,7-5
H. Owen (United States) d. (United States) K. Robottom 6-2,6-2,6-4
T. Pell (United States) d. (United States) G. Groesbeck 6-0,6-1,6-1
H. Harvey (United States) d. (United States) R. C.Thomas 6-2,6-2,6-2
W. Johnson (United States) d. (United States) L. Curtis 6-0,6-3,6-1
C. Griffin (United States) d. (United States) J. Thomas 6-1,6-4,8-6
A. Hammett (United States) d. (United States) A. Fox 6-3,6-3,6-4
R. Stevens (United States) d. (United States) E. Morgan 6-0,6-0,6-1
G. Gardner (United States) d. (United States) E. McCormick 6-4,4-6,6-0,6-2
M. McLoughlin (United States) d. (United States) C. Smith 6-1,6-2,6-0
I. Wright (United States) d. (United States) L. Cooper 2-6,6-2,6-2,6-3
E. Pearson (United States) d. (United States) R. Hazard 6-0,6-0,6-2
P. Wright (United States) d. (United States) E. Gould 6-0,7-5,3-6,6-0

4th round - F. Inman (United States) d. (United States) H. Johnson 6-2,6-8,6-4,6-8,9-7
G. Touchard (United States) d. (United States) E. Whitney 6-4,5-7,6-3,4-6,12-10
E. Fottrell (United States) d. (United States) C. Childs 6-1,6-2,6-4
N. Niles (United States) d. (United States) D. Mathey 6-3,6-3,6-3
C. Major (United States) d. (United States) S. Thayer 2-6,6-4,6-3,4-6,10-8
R. N. Williams (United States) d. (United States) A. Dabney 6-3,6-4,6-1
K. Behr (United States) d. (United States) R. LeRoy 6-2,6-4,2-6,6-3
R. L. Murray (United States) d. (United States) H. MacKinney 7-5,6-1,6-1
W. Clothier (United States) d. (United States) L. Beekman 6-4,8-6,6-2
W. Washburn (United States) d. (United States) H. Throckmorton 6-1,6-1,6-1
T. Pell (United States) d. (United States) H. Owen 6-0,6-0,6-1
W. Johnson (United States) d. (United States) H. Harvey 6-3,6-1,6-3
C. Griffin (United States) d. (United States) A. Hammett 6-3,6-3,6-3
G. Gardner (United States) d. (United States) R. Stevens 6-1,6-2,6-2
M. McLoughlin (United States) d. (United States) I. Wright 6-0,6-2,6-1
E. Pearson (United States) d. (United States) P. Wright 8-6,6-1,6-1

5th round - G. Touchard (United States) d. (United States) F. Inman 4-6,1-6,6-3,6-3,6-0
E. Fottrell (United States) d. (United States) N. Niles 2-6,9-7,8-6,6-2
R. N. Williams (United States) d. (United States) C. Major 7-5,7-5,6-1
K. Behr (United States) d. (United States) R. L. Murray 3-6,6-2,7-5,3-6,8-6
W. Clothier (United States) d. (United States) W. Washburn 6-2,6-4,4-6,6-1
W. Johnson (United States) d. (United States) T. Pell 3-6,6-1,6-0,6-4
C. Griffin (United States) d. (United States) G. Gardner w/o
M. McLoughlin (United States) d. (United States) E. Pearson 6-1,6-2,6-3
