= Tom Bundy =

American tennis player

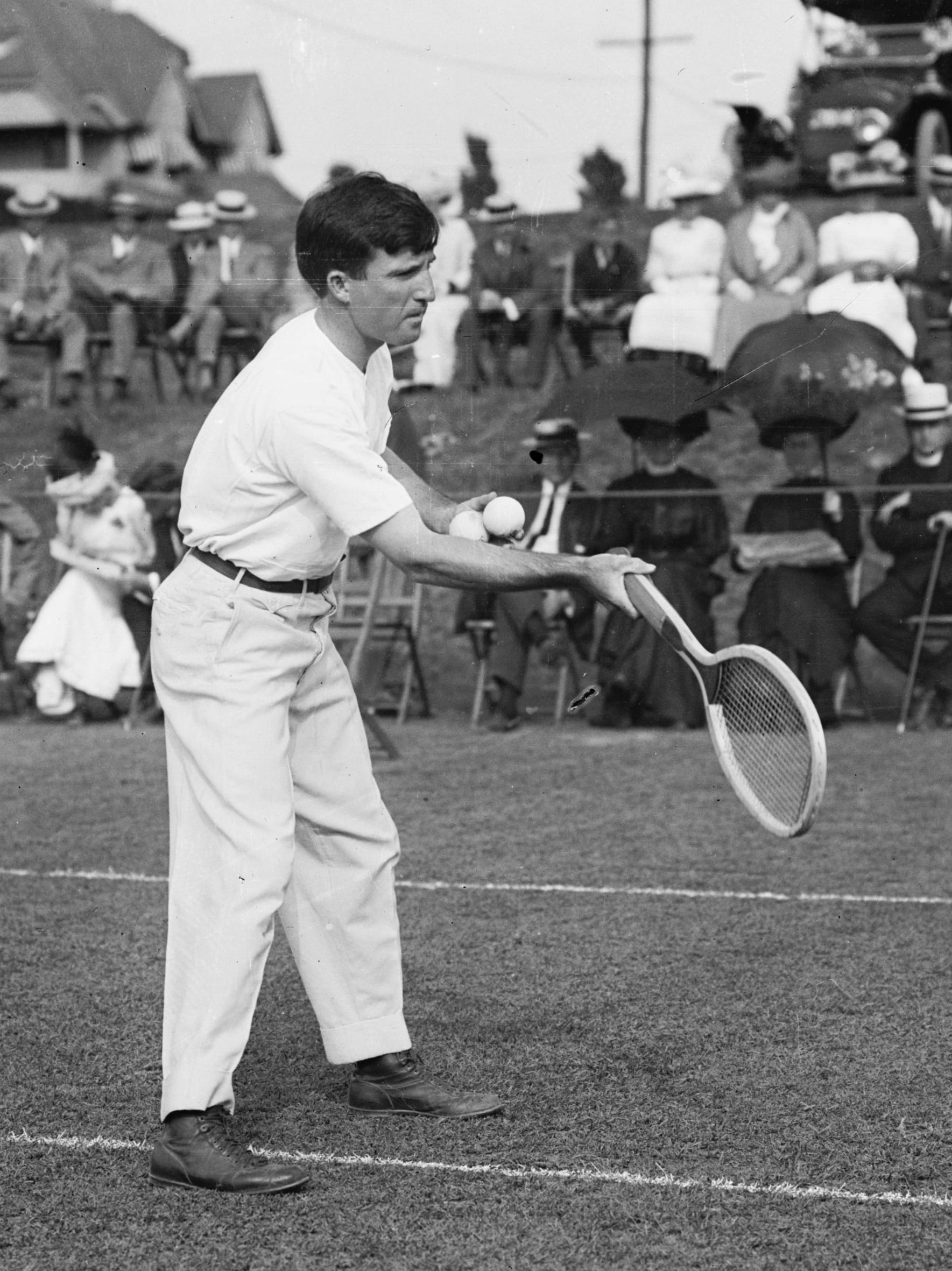
- Tom Bundy at the U.S. National Championships
- Full name: Thomas Clark Bundy
- Country (sports): United States
- Born: October 8, 1881 Los Angeles, California, U.S.
- Died: October 13, 1945 (aged 64) Los Angeles, California, U.S.

Singles

Grand Slam singles results
- US Open: F (1910^{Ch})

Doubles

Grand Slam doubles results
- US Open: W (1912, 1913, 1914)

Thomas Clark Bundy (October 8, 1881 – October 13, 1945) was a tennis player from Los Angeles, California, who was active in the early 20th century. With Maurice McLoughlin, he won three doubles titles at the U.S. National Championships. Bundy Drive, a major thoroughfare in West Los Angeles, is named for him.

== Tennis career ==
Bundy won the All-Comers singles final against Beals Wright, but finished runner-up to William Larned in a five-set Challenge Round at the U.S. National Championships in 1910. He also reached the semifinals in 1909 and 1911. Bundy won three consecutive doubles titles at the championships, alongside Maurice McLoughlin, in 1912, 1913, and 1914.

When the Los Angeles Tennis Club was founded in 1920 Bundy was elected as its first president.

== Personal life ==
On December 11, 1912 Bundy married tennis player U.S. National Championships and Wimbledon champion May Sutton. They separated in 1923 and were divorced in 1940. The couple had four children including daughter Dorothy Cheney, a tennis player who won the singles title at the 1938 Australian Championships.

== Grand Slam finals ==
=== Singles (1 runner-up) ===
Result	Year	Championship	Surface	Opponent	Score
Loss	1910	U.S. National Championships	Grass	(United States) William Larned	1–6, 7–5, 0–6, 8–6, 1–6

=== Doubles (3 titles, 2 runner-ups) ===
Result	Year	Championship	Surface	Partner	Opponents	Score
Loss	1910	U.S. National Championships	Grass	(United States) Trowridge Hendrick	(United States) Fred Alexander (United States) Harold Hackett	1–6, 6–8, 3–6
Win	1912	U.S. National Championships	Grass	(United States) Maurice McLoughlin	(United States) Raymond Little (United States) Gustave Touchard	3–6, 6–2, 6–1, 7–5
Win	1913	U.S. National Championships	Grass	(United States) Maurice McLoughlin	(United States) John Strachan (United States) Clarence Griffin	6–4, 7–5, 6–1
Win	1914	U.S. National Championships	Grass	(United States) Maurice McLoughlin	(United States) George Church (United States) Dean Mathey	6–4, 6–2, 6–4
Loss	1915	U.S. National Championships	Grass	(United States) Maurice McLoughlin	(United States) Bill Johnston (United States) Clarence Griffin	6–2, 3–6, 4–6, 6–3, 3–6

== Grand Slam tournament singles performance timeline ==
Key
W	F	SF	QF	#R	RR	Q#	DNQ	A	NH

(W) winner; (F) finalist; (SF) semifinalist; (QF) quarterfinalist; (#R) rounds 4, 3, 2, 1; (RR) round-robin stage; (Q#) qualification round; (DNQ) did not qualify; (A) absent; (NH) not held; (SR) strike rate (events won / competed); (W–L) win–loss record.

Tournament	1909	1910	1911	1912	1913
Australian Open	A	A	A	A	A
Wimbledon	A	A	A	A	A
US Open	SF	F^{Ch}	SF	4R	2R
