= Eleonora Sears =

American tennis player

- Full name: Eleonora Randolph Sears
- Country (sports): United States
- Born: September 28, 1881 Boston, Massachusetts, U.S.
- Died: March 16, 1968 (aged 86) Palm Beach, Florida, U.S.
- Plays: Right-handed
- Int. Tennis HoF: 1968 (member page)

Singles
- Highest ranking: No.6 (US ranking)

Grand Slam singles results
- Wimbledon: 2R (1923)
- US Open: F (1912)

Grand Slam doubles results
- Wimbledon: 2R (1924)
- US Open: W (1911, 1915, 1916, 1917)

Grand Slam mixed doubles results
- Wimbledon: 2R (1923)
- US Open: W (1916)

Eleonora Randolph Sears (September 28, 1881 – March 16, 1968) was an American tennis champion of the 1910s. In addition, she was a champion squash player, and prominent in other sports; she is considered one of the leading all-round women athletes of the first half of the 20th century.

== Early life ==
Sears was the daughter of Boston businessman Frederick Richard Sears and a granddaughter of T. Jefferson Coolidge (who was a great-grandson of Thomas Jefferson) and Hetty Appleton, and a cousin of Henry Cabot Lodge. Sears' father was also known for playing the first tennis game in the United States, his opponent being his cousin James Dwight who brought the game from Europe.

Sears was raised in wealth and privilege. She was acquainted with Corinne Douglass Robinson, Eleanor Roosevelt and Alice Roosevelt, all related to President Theodore Roosevelt. She played tennis at a competition organized by Ava Lowle Willing, the wife of John Jacob Astor IV, and she attended the wedding of tennis champion Robert Wrenn. For a while she dated Harold Stirling Vanderbilt, the sporty scion of the Vanderbilt fortune.

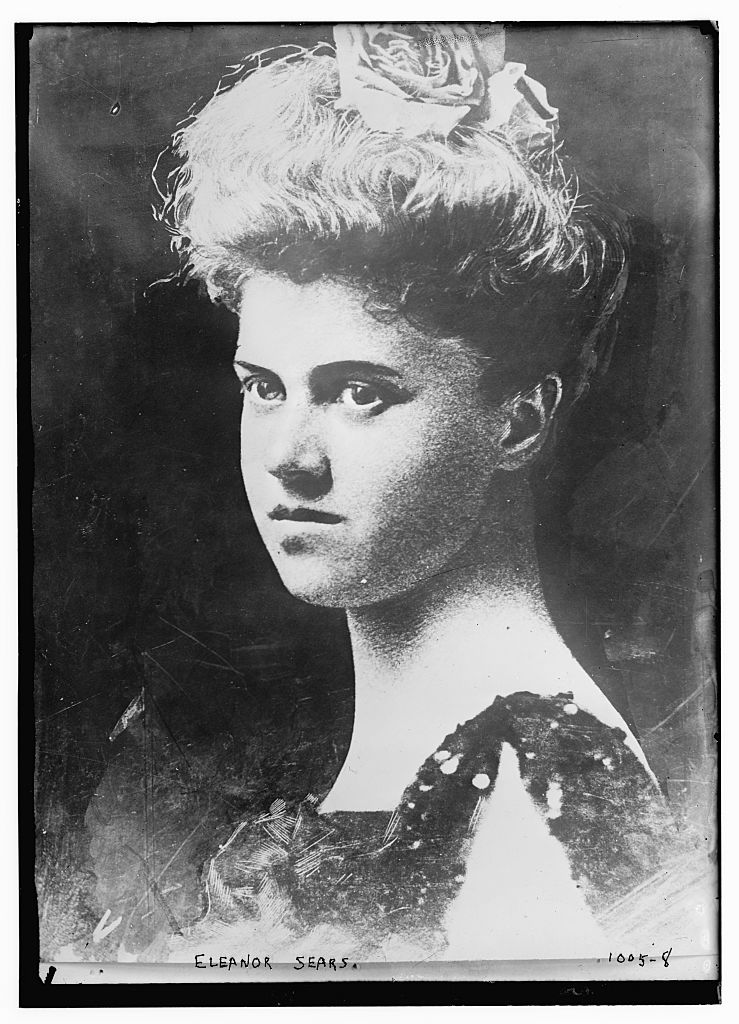
Portrait of Sears (unknown date)

== Career ==
Sears won the women's doubles at the U. S. Women's National Championships four times, including three consecutively (1915–1917). In singles, she was a finalist in 1912, where she was beaten in straight sets by Mary Browne. She teamed with Willis E. Davis to take the national mixed doubles championship in 1916.

In August 1938 at the age of 56, she lost to Dorothy Bundy in the second round of the Essex County Club Invitational in Manchester, Massachusetts 6–0, 6–1.

She lived in Boston, and eventually inherited a waterfront mansion known as “Rock Edge" in Beverly, MA to use as a summer residence. In later years it became her primary residence, and she was living there when she died in 1968.

She purchased the Burrland Farm for horses in 1955, then "deliberately gutted and burned [its mansion] down" in 1961 to reduce property taxes. She sold the farm in 1966.

She was inducted into the International Tennis Hall of Fame in 1968, joining her uncle Richard (inducted 1955).

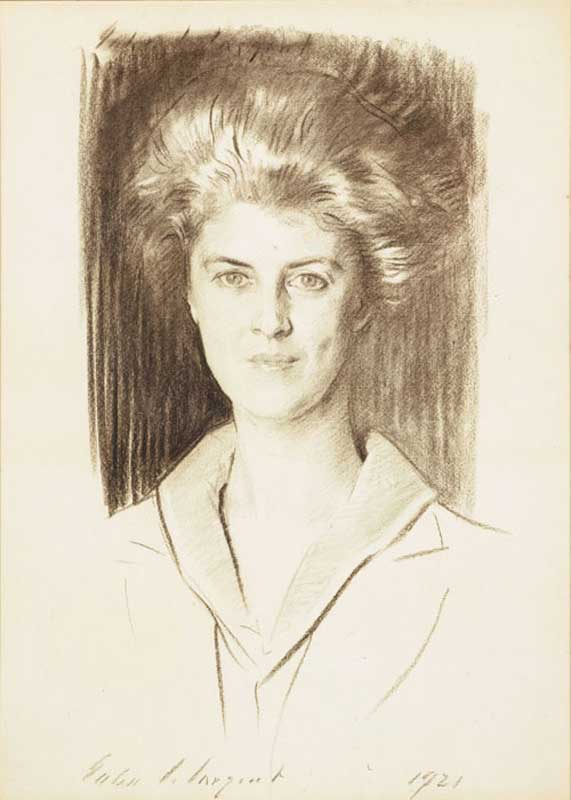
Portrait of Sears by John Singer Sargent (1921)

Eleonora Sears rode horses competitively and was elected to the U. S. Show Jumping Hall of Fame in 1992. She also owned and raced Thoroughbred horses. She was the first woman to play polo on a men's team.

Sears was the first female national squash champion, a founder of the Women's Squash Racquets Association, and coach of the U. S. Women's International Squash Team.

She gained media attention for her long-distance walks and hikes. As well, she was one of the first American women to drive an automobile and fly a plane. She played 19 sports in all, including rifle shooting, boxing, football, and ice skating. Her habit of wearing trousers, both when competing in sports and in public, was criticized in media and social circles.

== Grand Slam finals ==
=== Singles: 1 (1 runner-up) ===
Result	Year	Championship	Surface	Opponent	Score
Loss	1912	U. S. National Championships	Grass	(United States) Mary Browne	4–6, 2–6

=== Doubles: 5 (4 titles, 1 runner-up) ===
Result	Year	Championship	Surface	Partner	Opponents	Score
Win	1911	U. S. National Championships	Grass	(United States) Hazel Hotchkiss	(United States) Dorothy Green (United States) Florence Sutton	6–4, 4–6, 6–2
Win	1915	U.S. National Championships	Grass	(United States) Hazel Hotchkiss	(United States) Helen McLean (United States) Mrs. G. L. Chapman	10–8, 6–2
Win	1916	U. S. National Championships	Grass	(Norway) Molla Bjurstedt	(United States) Louise Raymond (United States) Edna Wildey	4–6, 6–2, 10–8
Win	1917	U. S. National Championships	Grass	(Norway) Molla Bjurstedt	(United States) Phyllis Walsh (United States) Grace Robert LeRoy	6–2, 6–4
Loss	1919	U. S. National Championships	Grass	(United States) Hazel Hotchkiss	(United States) Marion Zinderstein (United States) Eleanor Goss	8–10, 7–9

=== Mixed doubles: 2 (1 title, 1 runner-up) ===
Result	Year	Championship	Surface	Partner	Opponents	Score
Loss	1912	U. S. National Championships	Grass	(United States) William Clothier	(United States) Mary Browne (United States) R. Norris Williams	4–6, 6–2, 9–11
Win	1916	U. S. National Championships	Grass	(United States) Willis E. Davis	(United States) Florence Ballin (United States) Bill Tilden	6–4, 7–5

== Later life and death ==
Later in life she lived in Florida with Marie V. Gendron (July 22, 1903 – January 26, 2004), nickname madame, who, at Sears' death, inherited her whole estate. She retained half of it, including Sears' house in Florida, jewelry and works of arts, and gave the rest to six Massachusetts hospitals.

== See also ==
- International Tennis Hall of Fame
