= John Strachan (tennis) =

American tennis player

John R. Strachan
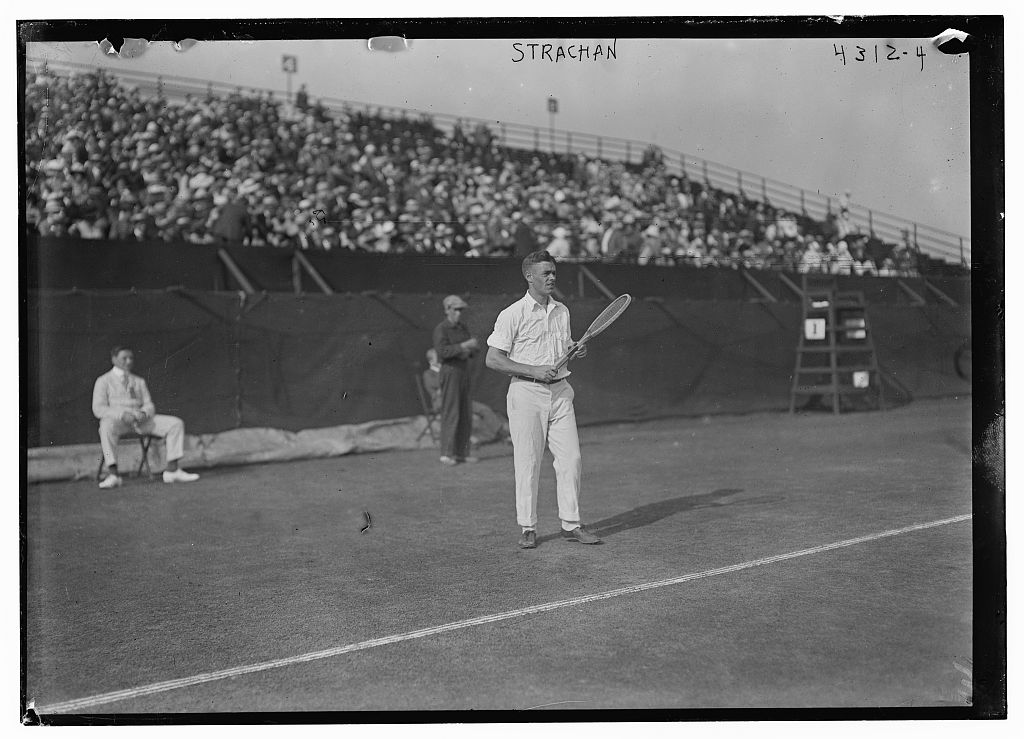
- Strachan at the U.S. National Championships in 1917
- Full name: John R. Strachan
- Country (sports): United States
- Born: March 17, 1895 San Francisco, USA
- Died: December 11, 1970 (aged 75)
- Plays: Right-handed (one-handed backhand)

Singles

Grand Slam singles results
- US Open: SF (1917)

Doubles

Grand Slam doubles results
- US Open: F (1913)

John Richard Strachan (March 17, 1895 – December 11, 1970) was an American tennis player active in the 1910s.

== Biography ==
He was born in San Francisco, California on 17 March 1895.

Strachan reached the semifinals of the U.S. National Championships in 1917 and the quarterfinals in 1913.

Alongside doubles partner Clarence Griffin, Strachan won the Pacific Coast Lawn Tennis Championship in 1913.

He died on 11 December 1970 in San Francisco, California.

== Grand Slam finals ==
=== Doubles (1 runner-up) ===
Result	Year	Championship	Surface	Partner	Opponents	Score
Loss	1913	U.S. Championships	Grass	(United States) Clarence Griffin	(United States) Maurice E. McLoughlin (United States) Tom Bundy	4–6, 5–7, 1–6
