= 1911–12 Challenge Cup =

Rugby league competition

- Duration: 5 rounds
- Highest attendance: 15,271
- Winners: Dewsbury
- Runners-up: Oldham

The 1911–12 Challenge Cup was the 16th staging of rugby league's oldest knockout competition, the Challenge Cup.

The final was contested by Dewsbury and Oldham at Headingley Rugby Stadium in Leeds.

The final was played on Saturday, 27 April 1912, where Dewsbury caused an upset to beat Oldham 8–5 at Headingley in front of a crowd of 15,271.

Dewsbury won the Challenge Cup in their first appearance in the final.

== First round ==
Date	Team One	Team Two	Score
17 Feb	Barrow	St Helens	13-3
17 Feb	Batley	Runcorn	22-0
17 Feb	Beverley	Hull Kingston Rovers	5-34
17 Feb	Bradford Northern	Rochdale Hornets	0-13
17 Feb	Broughton Rangers	Bramley	25-3
17 Feb	Coventry	Oldham	3-21
17 Feb	Dewsbury	Lane End Utd	36-9
17 Feb	Halifax	Ebbw Vale	10-2
17 Feb	Huddersfield	Swinton	30-0
17 Feb	Hull FC	York	20-8
17 Feb	Leigh	Hunslet	13-0
17 Feb	Millom	Keighley	0-11
17 Feb	Normanton St John's	Warrington	6-6
17 Feb	Wakefield Trinity	Leeds	10-2
17 Feb	Widnes	Salford	3-8
17 Feb	Wigan	Wg. Highfield	35-10
19 Feb - replay	Warrington	Normanton St John's	75-0

== Second round ==
Date	Team One	Team Two	Score
02 Mar	Barrow	Batley	0-0
02 Mar	Halifax	Broughton Rangers	19-8
02 Mar	Hull FC	Rochdale Hornets	27-5
02 Mar	Hull Kingston Rovers	Warrington	3-3
02 Mar	Keighley	Wakefield Trinity	2-13
02 Mar	Leigh	Huddersfield	6-33
02 Mar	Oldham	Wigan	12-8
02 Mar	Salford	Dewsbury	8-9
05 Mar - replay	Batley	Barrow	7-5
06 Mar - replay	Warrington	Hull Kingston Rovers	3-0

== Quarter-finals ==
Date	Team One	Team Two	Score
23 Mar	Dewsbury	Batley	5-2
23 Mar	Hull FC	Halifax	2-11
23 Mar	Oldham	Huddersfield	2-0
23 Mar	Warrington	Wakefield Trinity	3-3
27 Mar - replay	Wakefield Trinity	Warrington	10-5

== Semi-finals ==
Date	Team One	Team Two	Score
13 Apr	Halifax	Dewsbury	5-8
13 Apr	Oldham	Wakefield Trinity	17-0

== Final ==
Date	Team One	Team Two	Score
27 Apr	Dewsbury	Oldham	8-5
