= 1913 U.S. National Championships – Men's singles =

Tennis tournament held in 1913

Men's singles
- 1913 U.S. National Championships

Final
- Champion: (United States) Maurice McLoughlin
- Runner-up: (United States) R. Norris Williams
- Score: 6–4, 5–7, 6–3, 6–1

Events
Singles	men	women
Doubles	men	women
← 1912 ·	U.S. National Championships	· 1914 →

Maurice McLoughlin defeated R. Norris Williams 6–4, 5–7, 6–3, 6–1 in the final to win the men's singles tennis title at the 1913 U.S. National Championships. The event was held at the Newport Casino in Newport, R.I. in the United States. There were more than 128 players in the draw.

== Draw ==
=== Finals ===
Quarterfinals
(United States) Leonard Beekman	0	7	2
(United States) Nathaniel Niles	6	9	6
(United States) Watson Washburn	1	5	3
(United States) R. Norris Williams	6	7	6
(United States) John Strachan	6	2	2	4
(United States) Wallace F. Johnson	2	6	6	6
(United States) Maurice McLoughlin	6	7	6
(United States) William Clothier	3	5	4

Semifinals
(United States) Nathaniel Niles	4	5	6	1
(United States) R. Norris Williams	6	7	3	6
(United States) Wallace F. Johnson	0	5	1
(United States) Maurice McLoughlin	6	7	6

Final
(United States) R. Norris Williams	4	7	3	1
(United States) Maurice McLoughlin	6	5	6	6

=== Earlier rounds ===
1st round - R. Griswold (United States) d. (United States) C. Beck 9-7,9-7,6-3
G. Burgess (United States) d. (United States) J. Calvert 6-0,6-2,6-1
W. Johnston (United States) d. (United States) G. Adee w/o
W. Blair (United States) d. (United States) I. Shelley 6-4,6-4,8-6
C. Lipscom (United States) d. (United States) C. Leonard w/o
G. Caner (United States) d. (United States) Joseph Dwight 6-1,6-2,6-3
E. Wilson (United States) d. (United States) K. Von Lersner 6-2,3-6,6-1,2-6,4-5 rtd.
H. Voshell (United States) d. (United States) H. Hartshorn w/o
G. Touchard (United States) d. (United States) W. Roberts 6-2,6-0,6-3
R. N. Williams (United States) d. (United States) R. Seaver w/o
C. Bull (United States) d. (United States) E. Gould 6-2,6-0,6-1
F. Marden (United States) d. (United States) S. Merrihew 6-2,6-2,10-8
F. Inman (United States) d. (United States) J. Thomas 6-4,10-8,11-9
F. Colston (United States) d. (United States) S. Rogers 7-9,6-2,6-3,5-7,7-5
A. Kennedy jr (United States) d. (United States) R. Baggs 7-5,6-1,2-6,6-3
J. Strachan (United States) d. (United States) F. Frelinghuysen 6-1,6-2,6-3
T. Bundy (United States) d. (United States) A. Kennedy 6-1,6-1,6-0
H. Von Lersner (United States) d. (United States) L. Hobbs 6-2,6-2,6-1
D. Mathey (United States) d. (United States) R. Johnson 6-1,6-1,6-1
C. Griffin (United States) d. (United States) E. Woods w/o

2nd round - F. Cole (United States) d. (United States) W. Thomson w/o
H. Swain (United States) d. (United States) C. Frailey 6-2,6-4,6-1
W. Huyl (United States) d. (United States) H. Hackett w/o
G. Wightman (United States) d. (United States) E. Diepholz w/o
L. Beekman (United States) d. (United States) A. Tobey 6-4,6-3,6-3
P. Fosdick (United States) d. (United States) D. Morgan 6-4,6-1,6-0
W. Burden (United States) d. (United States) L. Thomas 6-0,6-2,6-1
A. Champlin (United States) d. (United States) L. Goldman w/o
G. Gardner (United States) d. (United States) E. Taylor w/o
H. Owen (United States) d. (United States) E. Stille 3-6,6-3,6-8,6-2,10-8
P. Sheldon (United States) d. (United States) R. Gambrill w/o
H. MacKinney (United States) d. (United States) C. Childs 6-3,6-0,6-3
N. Niles (United States) d. (United States) J. Carpenter 6-2,6-3,6-1
W. McKim (United States) d. (United States) N. Vose 6-2,6-3,7-5
G. Beals (United States) d. (United States) A. Dutton 6-0,6-2,6-3
A. Hammett (United States) d. (United States) C. Buchanan 6-3,6-0,6-2
J. Weber (United States) d. (United States) F. Roche 6-8,6-3,6-1,6-2
A. Dabney (United States) d. (United States) P. Valle 6-0,6-2,6-0
R. Evans (United States) d. (United States) R. Stevens 6-3,6-4,6-2
G. Phillips (United States) d. (United States) E. Pearson 7-5,2-6,6-3,7-5
A. Codman (United States) d. (United States) A. Merriam w/o
H. Johnson (United States) d. (United States) G. Rushmore 6-3,6-1,6-0
W. Kenyon (United States) d. (United States) S. Cushman 6-1,6-3,6-1
W. Washburn (United States) d. (United States) D. Josephs 6-2,6-1,6-3
C. Cutting (United States) d. (United States) H. Harvey 6-3,6-3,6-3
B. Law (United States) d. (United States) F. Dixon 6-1,6-3,6-4
J. Cameron (United States) d. (United States) F. Harris w/o
G. Burgess (United States) d. (United States) R. Griswold 6-4,6-1,6-0
W. Johnston (United States) d. (United States) W. Blair 6-3,6-2,6-2
G. Caner (United States) d. (United States) C. Lipscom w/o
H. Voshell (United States) d. (United States) E. Wilson 6-2,7-5,6-1
R. N. Williams (United States) d. (United States) G. Touchard 3-6,6-4,1-6,6-4,7-5
C. Bull (United States) d. (United States) F. Marden 8-6,7-5,6-3
F. Inman (United States) d. (United States) F. Colston 2-6,6-4,6-2,6-1
J. Strachan (United States) d. (United States) A. Kennedy jr 6-1,6-4,6-1
T. Bundy (United States) d. (United States) H. von Lernser 6-0,6-1,6-2
D. Mathey (United States) d. (United States) C. Griffin w/o
G. Groesbeck (United States) d. (United States) G. Lewis 6-3,6-2,3-6,6-2
E. Whitney (United States) d. (United States) M. Kernochan 6-1,6-0,6-0
R. Seabury (United States) d. (United States) W. Dean 6-0,6-3,6-0
K. Behr (United States) d. (United States) E. Leonard w/o
R. Hazard (United States) d. (United States) A. Sands 8-6,8-6,6-3
J. Brown (United States) d. (United States) E. Peaslee w/o
S. Henshaw (United States) d. (United States) J. Taylor 6-2,6-0,6-2
E. Conlin (United States) d. (United States) E. Donn 2-6,7-5,3-6,6-4,7-5
J. Moore (United States) d. (United States) L. Dreyfus w/o
W. Johnson (United States) d. (United States) S. McKean w/o
H. Slocum (United States) d. (United States) L. Curtis 6-3,6-2,6-3
F. Drew (United States) d. (United States) S. Paine 6-1,6-4,6-0
W. Brownell (United States) d. (United States) F. Fearing w/o
M. McLoughlin (United States) d. (United States) A. Pinchot 6-2,6-0,6-2
H. Nickerson (United States) d. (United States) W. Bourne 6-2,6-2,6-3
R. Palmer (United States) d. (United States) J. Gratz 6-1,6-1,6-2
C. Felton (United States) d. (United States) T. Dunlap 6-0,6-0,6-1
J. Armstrong (United States) d. (United States) J. Bell 7-5,6-3,6-4
R. LeRoy (United States) d. (United States) A. Peterson 6-1,6-1,6-1
E. Pendergast (United States) d. (United States) E. Torrey 6-4,6-3,6-4
F. Watrous (United States) d. (United States) R. Sommer 6-4,6-1,6-1
G. Church (United States) d. (United States) W. Kuhn 6-4,6-2,6-1
W. Clothier (United States) d. (United States) B. Wagner 6-2,6-0,6-3
W. Pate (United States) d. (United States) H. Beyer 6-0,6-1,6-2
F. Paul (United States) d. (United States) G. Peak w/o
W. Rosenbaum (United States) d. (United States) E. Krumbhaar 6-3,7-5,7-5
F. Woodward (United States) d. (United States) W. Larned w/o

3rd round - F. Cole (United States) d. (United States) H. Swain 6-1,6-3,6-1
G. Wightman (United States) d. (United States) W. Huyl 6-3,6-1,6-1
L. Beekman (United States) d. (United States) P. Fosdick 6-0,6-1,6-0
W. Burden (United States) d. (United States) A. Champlin 8-6,6-1,6-4
G. Gardner (United States) d. (United States) H. Owen 6-1,6-2,6-1
H. MacKinney (United States) d. (United States) P. Sheldon 6-3,6-0,6-2
N. Niles (United States) d. (United States) W. McKim 6-3,6-1,6-2
G. Beals (United States) d. (United States) A. Hammett 8-6,6-3,6-1
A. Dabney (United States) d. (United States) J. Weber 12-10,6-1,6-4
R. Evans (United States) d. (United States) G. Phillips 6-4,6-4,7-5
H. Johnson (United States) d. (United States) A. Codman 6-3,6-4,6-2
W. Washburn (United States) d. (United States) W. Kenyon 6-0,6-0,6-0
B. Law (United States) d. (United States) C. Cutting 7-5,6-4,3-6,6-3
G. Burgess (United States) d. (United States) J. Cameron w/o
W. Johnston (United States) d. (United States) G. Caner 8-6,6-1,6-2
R. N. Williams (United States) d. (United States) H. Voshell 6-2,6-3,3-6,6-4
C. Bull (United States) d. (United States) F. Inman 10-8,5-7,5-7,6-2,6-4
J. Strachan (United States) d. (United States) T. Bundy 6-2,6-3,6-4
D. Mathey (United States) d. (United States) G. Groesbeck 6-2,6-0,7-5
E. Whitney (United States) d. (United States) R. Seabury 1-6,6-3,6-3,6-3
R. Hazard (United States) d. (United States) K. Behr w/o
J. Brown (United States) d. (United States) S. Henshaw 6-2,6-2,2-6,6-1
J. Moore (United States) d. (United States) E. Conlin 6-2,6-4,6-1
W. Johnson (United States) d. (United States) H. Slocum 6-1,6-3,6-3
W. Brownell (United States) d. (United States) F. Drew 2-6,6-2,7-9,6-2,6-1
M. McLoughlin (United States) d. (United States) H. Nickerson 6-3,6-1,6-3
R. Palmer (United States) d. (United States) C. Felton 6-4,6-3,6-3
R. LeRoy (United States) d. (United States) J. Armstrong 6-4,4-6,6-1,7-5
F. Watrous (United States) d. (United States) E. Pendergast 7-5,4-6,6-1,6-3
W. Clothier (United States) d. (United States) G. Church 6-0,3-6,6-3,6-3
W. Pate (United States) d. (United States) F. Paul 6-2,6-3,2-6,6-3
W. Rosenbaum (United States) d. (United States) F. Woodward 6-2,6-1,6-2

4th round - F. Cole (United States) d. (United States) G. Wightman 8-6,6-1,6-3
L. Beekman (United States) d. (United States) W. Burden 6-4,7-5,6-1
G. Gardner (United States) d. (United States) H. MacKinney 6-2,6-3,6-4
N. Niles (United States) d. (United States) G. Beals 6-2,6-3,6-4
R. Evans (United States) d. (United States) A. Dabney 6-3,6-1,9-7
W. Washburn (United States) d. (United States) H. Johnson 6-4,6-3,6-3
B. Law (United States) d. (United States) G. Burgess 4-6,6-0,6-0,6-3
R. N. Williams (United States) d. (United States) W. Johnston 6-3,6-4,3-6,8-6
J. Strachan (United States) d. (United States) C. Bull 6-1,6-3,6-2
E. Whitney (United States) d. (United States) D. Mathey 8-6,9-7,7-5
J. Brown (United States) d. (United States) R. Hazard 6-3,3-6,6-3,6-1
W. Johnson (United States) d. (United States) J. Moore 6-2,6-0,6-2
M. McLoughlin (United States) d. (United States) W. Brownell 6-0,6-1,6-2
R. LeRoy (United States) d. (United States) R. Palmer 6-0,6-2,6-1
W. Clothier (United States) d. (United States) F. Watrous 6-1,6-2,6-0
W. Pate d . W. Rosenbaum 6-3,6-3,6-2

5th round - L. Beekman (United States) d. (United States) F. Cole 3-6,4-6,7-5,6-2,6-3
N. Niles (United States) d. (United States) G. Gardner 6-3,6-4,4-6,6-1
W. Washburn (United States) d. (United States) R. Evans 6-2,6-2,2-6,6-2
R. N. Williams (United States) d. (United States) B. Law 6-4,8-6,6-1
J. Strachan (United States) d. (United States) E. Whitney 6-4,8-6,6-1
W. Johnson (United States) d. (United States) J. Brown 6-3,6-1,6-3
M. McLoughlin (United States) d. (United States) R. LeRoy 6-2,6-4,6-4
W. Clothier (United States) d. (United States) W. Pate 6-0,6-2,6-1

Preceded by 1913 Wimbledon Championships – Men's singles	Grand Slam men's singles	Succeeded by 1914 Australasian Championships – Men's singles
