= 1912 U.S. National Championships – Women's singles =

Women's singles
- 1912 U.S. National Championships

Final
- Champion: (United States) Mary Browne
- Runner-up: (United States) Eleonora Sears
- Score: 6–4, 6–2

Details
- Draw: 35
- Seeds: –

Events
Singles	men	women
Doubles	men	women
- U.S. National Championships

Mary Browne defeated Eleonora Sears 6–4, 6–2 in the tennis final of the 1912 U.S. Women's National Singles Championship. The event was held at the Philadelphia Cricket Club in Philadelphia in the United States from June 10 through June 15, 1912. The defending champion, Hazel Hotchkiss Wightman, did not participate in this edition and therefore no challenge round was played.

== Draw ==
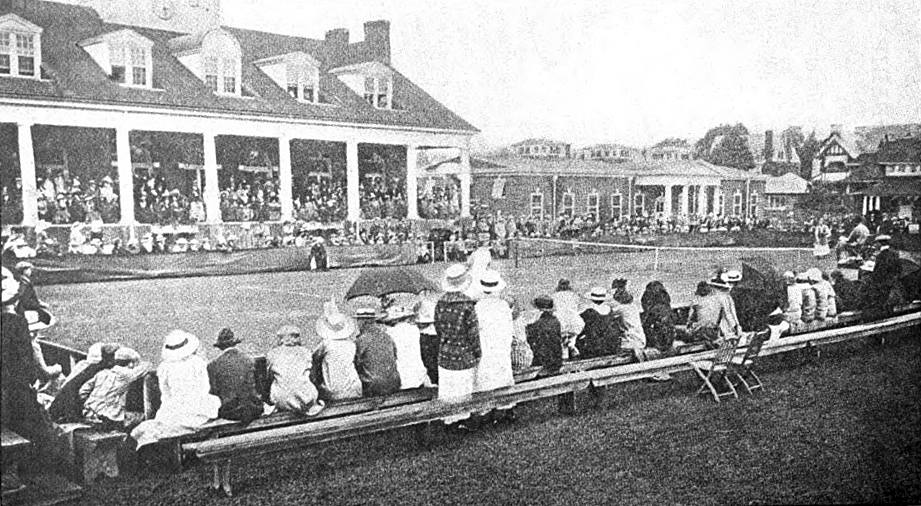
1912 U.S. Women's National Championship

=== Finals ===
Quarterfinals
(United States) Mary Browne	6	6
(United States) Marian Fenno	0	4
(United States) Adelaide Browning	6	10
(United States) Augusta Schmitz	1	8
(United States) Eleonora Sears	6	6
(United States) Helen Alexander	2	2
(United States) Effie Wheeler
(United States) Mary Merrick	w/o

Semifinals
(United States) Mary Browne	6	3	9
(United States) Adelaide Browning	4	6	7
(United States) Eleonora Sears	5	6	6
(United States) Mary Merrick	7	0	2

Finals
(United States) Mary Browne	6	6
(United States) Eleonora Sears	4	2

Preceded by 1911 Wimbledon Championships – Women's singles	Grand Slam women's singles	Succeeded by 1912 Wimbledon Championships – Women's singles
