= 1912 Wimbledon Championships – Women's singles =

Women's singles
- 1912 Wimbledon Championships

Final
- Champion: (United Kingdom) Ethel Larcombe
- Runner-up: (United Kingdom) Charlotte Sterry
- Score: 6–3, 6–1

Details
- Draw: 34
- Seeds: –

Events
Singles	men	women
Doubles	men	women
← 1911 ·	Wimbledon Championships	· 1913 →

Ethel Larcombe defeated Charlotte Sterry 6–3, 6–1 in the all comers' final to win the ladies' singles tennis title at the 1912 Wimbledon Championships. The reigning champion Dorothea Lambert Chambers did not defend her title.

== Draw ==
=== Key ===
- Q = Qualifier
- WC = Wild card
- LL = Lucky loser
- Alt = Alternate
- SE = Special exempt
- PR = Protected ranking
- ITF = ITF entry
- JE = Junior exempt
- w/o = Walkover
- r = Retired
- d = Defaulted
- SR = Special ranking

=== All comers' finals ===
Quarterfinals
(United Kingdom) Winifred Longhurst	1	3
(United Kingdom) Charlotte Sterry	6	6
(United Kingdom) Dorothy Holman	7	6
(United Kingdom) Agnes Morton	5	2
(United Kingdom) Ethel Larcombe	6	5	6
(United Kingdom) Winifred McNair	2	7	0
(United Kingdom) Blanche Hillyard	3	8	6
(United States) Elizabeth Ryan	6	6	3

Semifinals
(United Kingdom) Charlotte Sterry	6	4	7
(United Kingdom) Dorothy Holman	3	6	5
(United Kingdom) Ethel Larcombe	6	6
(United Kingdom) Blanche Hillyard	1	0

Final
(United Kingdom) Charlotte Sterry	3	1
(United Kingdom) Ethel Larcombe	6	6

=== Top half ===
==== Section 1 ====
First round

Second round
(United Kingdom) Agnes Tuckey
(United Kingdom) Mrs V Woodhouse	w/o
(United Kingdom) Winifred Longhurst	6	6
(United Kingdom) Phyllis Satterthwaite	4	2
(United Kingdom) Dora Boothby	6	6
(United Kingdom) Edith Johnson	4	3
(United Kingdom) Charlotte Sterry	12	7
(United Kingdom) Mabel Parton	10	5

Third round
(United Kingdom) A Tuckey	6	6	1
(United Kingdom) W Longhurst	8	3	6
(United Kingdom) D Boothby	2	6	1
(United Kingdom) C Sterry	6	4	6

Quarterfinals
(United Kingdom) W Longhurst	1	3
(United Kingdom) C Sterry	6	6

==== Section 2 ====
First round
(United Kingdom) Olive Manser	4	6	6
(United Kingdom) Mrs WL Hollick	6	4	4

Second round
(United Kingdom) Helen Aitchison
(United Kingdom) Mrs Scott	w/o
(United Kingdom) Dorothy Holman	6	6
(United Kingdom) Beryl Tulloch	0	2
(United Kingdom) Madeline O'Neill	6	7
(United Kingdom) J Tripp	3	5
(United Kingdom) Agnes Morton	7	6
(United Kingdom) O Manser	5	2

Third round
(United Kingdom) H Aitchison	w/o
(United Kingdom) D Holman
(United Kingdom) M O'Neill	2	1
(United Kingdom) A Morton	6	6

Quarterfinals
(United Kingdom) D Holman	7	6
(United Kingdom) A Morton	5	2

=== Bottom half ===
==== Section 3 ====
First round
(United Kingdom) J Coles	6	6
(United Kingdom) EA Longhurst	3	4

Second round
(United Kingdom) J Coles	1	1
(United Kingdom) Edith Hannam	6	6
(United Kingdom) Ethel Larcombe
(United Kingdom) Hilda Lane	w/o
(United Kingdom) Tessa Hall
(United Kingdom) Mrs Armstrong	w/o
(United Kingdom) Winifred McNair	6	6
(United Kingdom) Vera Spofforth	3	2

Third round
(United Kingdom) E Hannam	5	6
(United Kingdom) E Larcombe	7	8
(United Kingdom) T Hall	1	2
(United Kingdom) W McNair	6	6

Quarterfinals
(United Kingdom) E Larcombe	6	5	6
(United Kingdom) W McNair	2	7	0

==== Section 4 ====
First round

Second round
(United Kingdom) Blanche Hillyard	2	6	7
(United Kingdom) Winifred Beamish	6	1	5
(United Kingdom) Miss Kribben
Miss Schultz	w/o
(United Kingdom) D Allen	8	5	6
(France) Marie Decugis	6	7	3
(United States) Elizabeth Ryan	7	6
(Belgium) Jeanne Liebrechts	5	3

Third round
(United Kingdom) B Hillyard
(United Kingdom) Miss Kribben	w/o
(United Kingdom) D Allen	1	2
(United States) E Ryan	6	6

Quarterfinals
(United Kingdom) B Hillyard	3	8	6
(United States) E Ryan	6	6	3

The nationality of Miss Schultz is unknown.

Preceded by 1912 U.S. National Championships – Women's singles	Grand Slam women's singles	Succeeded by 1913 U.S. National Championships – Women's singles
