= Louise Riddell Williams =

American tennis player

Louise R. Williams
- Country (sports): United States

Doubles

Grand Slam doubles results
- US Open: W (1913, 1914, 1921)

Louise Riddell Williams was an American tennis player in the early 20th century. She won the U.S. National Championship in women's doubles with Mary Kendall Browne in 1913, 1914 and 1921.

In 1914, she was named as a director of a new Chicago tennis club slated to open the following year.

== Grand Slam finals ==
=== Doubles (3 titles) ===
Result	Year	Championship	Surface	Partner	Opponents	Score
Win	1913	U.S. National Championships	Grass	(United States) Mary Kendall Browne	(United States) Dorothy Green (United States) Edna Wildey	12–10, 2–6, 6–3
Win	1914	U.S. National Championships	Grass	(United States) Mary Kendall Browne	(United States) Louise Raymond (United States) Edna Wildey	10–8, 6–2
Win	1921	U.S. National Championships	Grass	(United States) Mary Kendall Browne	(United States) Helen Gilleaudeau (United States) Mrs. L.G. Morris	6–3, 6–2
