= Edna Wildey =

American tennis player (1882–1970)

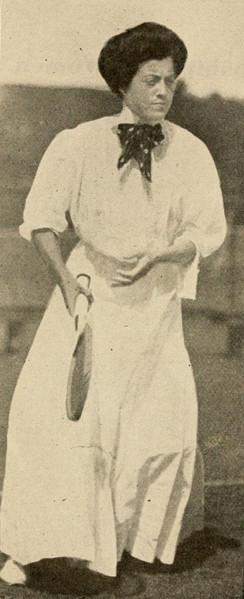
- Wildey in 1911
- Country (sports): United States
- Born: November 24, 1882 Brooklyn, New York, U.S.
- Died: March 29, 1970 (aged 87) San Angelo, Texas, U.S.

Singles

Grand Slam singles results
- US Open: F (1913)

Doubles

Grand Slam doubles results
- US Open: F (1907, 1910, 1913, 1914, 1916)

Grand Slam mixed doubles results
- US Open: F (1910, 1911)

Edna Wildey Welty (November 24, 1882 – March 29, 1970) was an American tennis player of the start of the 20th century.

Wildey who originated from Plainfield, New Jersey reached the women's doubles final of the U.S. National Championship five times but did not succeed in winning a title. She reached the finals of the mixed doubles twice but again did not win a title.

== Grand Slam finals ==
=== Doubles (5 runner-ups) ===
| Result | Year | Championship | Surface | Partner | Opponents | Score |
|---|---|---|---|---|---|---|
| Loss | 1907 | US National Championships | Grass | (United States) Natalie Wildey | (United States) Marie Wimer (United States) Carrie Neely | 1–6, 6–2, 4–6 |
| Loss | 1910 | US National Championships | Grass | (United States) Adelaide Browning | (United States) Hazel Hotchkiss Wightman (United States) Edith Rotch | 4–6, 4–6 |
| Loss | 1913 | US National Championships | Grass | (United States) Dorothy Green | (United States) Mary K. Browne (United States) Louise Riddell Williams | 10–12, 6–2, 3–6 |
| Loss | 1914 | US National Championships | Grass | (United States) Louise Raymond | (United States) Mary K. Browne (United States) Louise Riddell Williams | 8–10, 2–6 |
| Loss | 1916 | US National Championships | Grass | (United States) Louise Raymond | (Norway) Molla Bjurstedt Mallory (United States) Eleonora Sears | 6–4, 2–6, 8–10 |

=== Mixed doubles (2 runner-ups) ===
| Result | Year | Championship | Surface | Partner | Opponents | Score |
|---|---|---|---|---|---|---|
| Loss | 1910 | US National Championships | Grass | (United States) Herbert M. Tilden | (United States) Hazel Hotchkiss Wightman (United States) Joseph Carpenter Jr. | 2–6, 2–6 |
| Loss | 1911 | US National Championships | Grass | (United States) Herbert M. Tilden | (United States) Hazel Hotchkiss Wightman (United States) Wallace Johnson | 4–6, 4–6 |
