= Maurice McLoughlin =

American tennis player

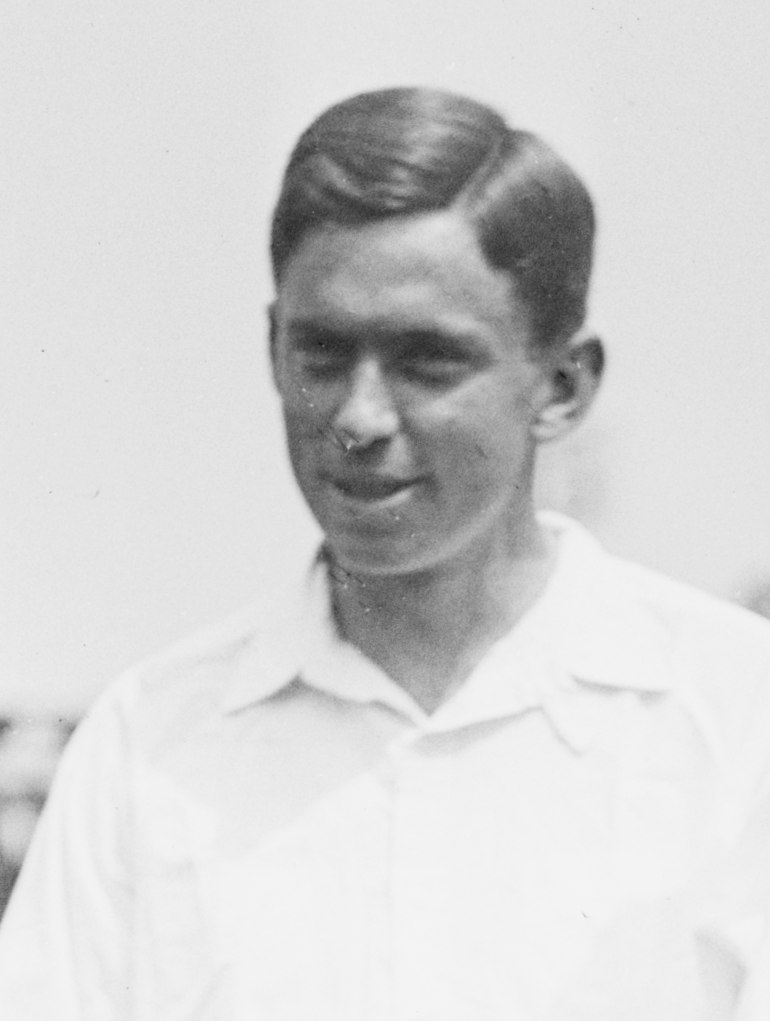
- Full name: Maurice Evans McLoughlin
- Country (sports): United States
- Residence: AKA "The California Comet"
- Born: January 7, 1890 Carson City, Nevada
- Died: December 10, 1957 (aged 67) Hermosa Beach, California
- Turned pro: 1906 (amateur circuit)
- Retired: 1919
- Plays: Right-handed (one-handed backhand)
- Int. Tennis HoF: 1957 (member page)

Singles
- Career record: 189–25 (88.3%)
- Career titles: 29
- Highest ranking: No. 1 (1914, A. Wallis Myers)

Grand Slam singles results
- Wimbledon: F (1913^{Ch})
- US Open: W (1912, 1913)

Grand Slam doubles results
- US Open: W (1912, 1913, 1914)

Team competitions
- Davis Cup: W (1913)

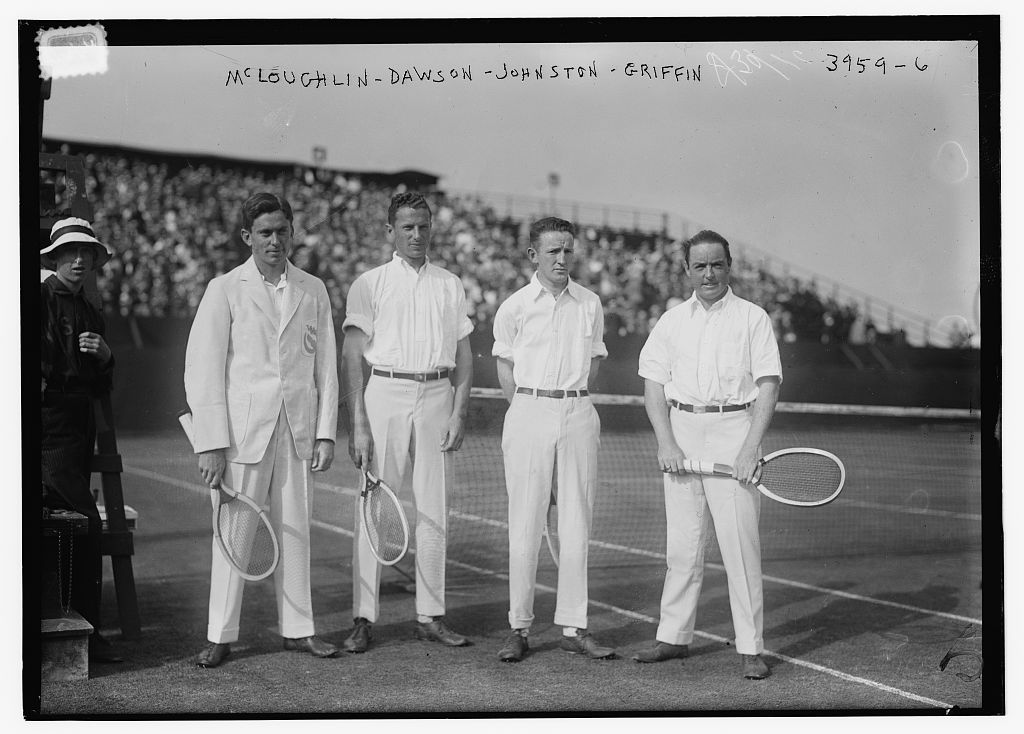
Maurice McLoughlin (1890-1957), Henry Ward Dawson (1890-1963), William Johnston (1894-1946), Clarence Griffin (1888-1973) on August 30, 1916 at the national men's doubles championship.

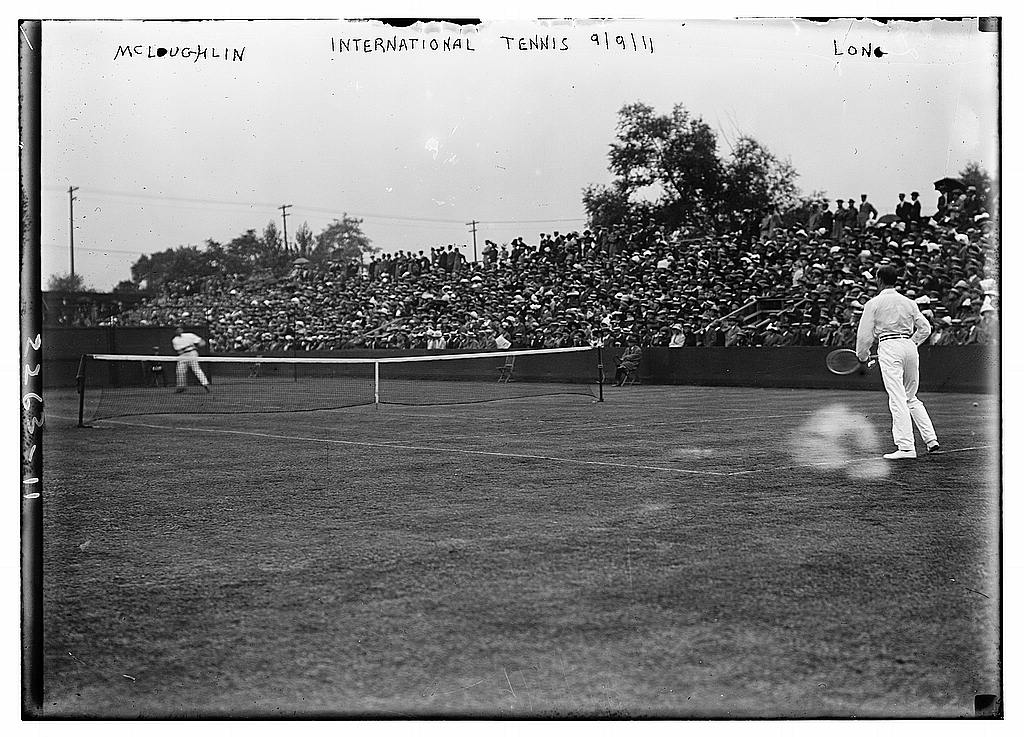
McLoughlin vs. Melville H. Long on September 9, 1911 at The Championships, Wimbledon

Maurice Evans McLoughlin (January 7, 1890 – December 10, 1957) was an American tennis player. Known for his powerful serve, overhead, and volley, McLoughlin was the first male tennis champion from the western United States.

== Biography ==
He was born on January 7, 1890, in Carson City, Nevada.

At the U.S. Championships, he won the singles twice, 1912 and 1913, and the doubles three times with Thomas Bundy, 1912-1914. In 1913 he also became the first American to be a finalist in the singles at Wimbledon when he defeated Stanley Doust in the final of the All-Comers tournament. He lost the Challenge Round in straight sets to defending champion Anthony Wilding.

The "California Comet" was the World No. 1 player for 1914. He married Helen Mears in 1918 and they had three children.

He died on December 10, 1957, in Hermosa Beach, California.

== Legacy ==
In 1915, McLoughlin published an instructional tennis book titled Tennis as I Play It, ghostwritten by Sinclair Lewis.

McLoughlin was inducted into the International Tennis Hall of Fame in Newport, Rhode Island in 1957.

== Grand Slam finals ==
=== Singles: (2 titles, 4 runner-up) ===
Result	Year	Championship	Surface	Opponent	Score
Loss	1911	U.S. National Championships	Grass	(United States) William Larned	4–6, 4–6, 2–6
Win	1912	U.S. National Championships	Grass	(United States) Wallace F. Johnson	3–6, 2–6, 6–2, 6–4, 6–2
Loss	1913	Wimbledon	Grass	(New Zealand) Anthony Wilding	6–8, 3–6, 8–10
Win	1913	U.S. National Championships	Grass	(United States) Richard Norris Williams	6–4, 5–7, 6–3, 6–1
Loss	1914	U.S. National Championships	Grass	(United States) Richard Norris Williams	3–6, 6–8, 8–10
Loss	1915	U.S. National Championships	Grass	(United States) Bill Johnston	6–1, 0–6, 5–7, 8–10

=== Doubles (3 titles, 2 runner-ups) ===
Result	Year	Championship	Surface	Partner	Opponents	Score
Win	1912	U.S. National Championships	Grass	(United States) Tom Bundy	(United States) Raymond Little (United States) Gustave Touchard	3–6, 6–2, 6–1, 7–5
Win	1913	U.S. National Championships	Grass	(United States) Tom Bundy	(United States) John Strachan (United States) Clarence Griffin	6–4, 7–5, 6–1
Win	1914	U.S. National Championships	Grass	(United States) Tom Bundy	(United States) George Church (United States) Dean Mathey	6–4, 6–2, 6–4
Loss	1915	U.S. National Championships	Grass	(United States) Tom Bundy	(United States) Clarence Griffin (United States) Bill Johnston	6–2, 3–6, 4–6, 6–3, 3–6
Loss	1916	U.S. National Championships	Grass	(United States) Henry Ward Dawson	(United States) Clarence Griffin (United States) Bill Johnston	4–6, 3–6, 7–5, 3–6

== Singles performance timeline ==
Key
W	F	SF	QF	#R	RR	Q#	DNQ	A	NH

(W) winner; (F) finalist; (SF) semifinalist; (QF) quarterfinalist; (#R) rounds 4, 3, 2, 1; (RR) round-robin stage; (Q#) qualification round; (DNQ) did not qualify; (A) absent; (NH) not held; (SR) strike rate (events won / competed); (W–L) win–loss record.

Events with a challenge round: (W_{C}) won; (CR) lost the challenge round; (F_{A}) all comers' finalist

	1909	1910	1911	1912	1913	1914	1915	1916	1917	1918	1919	SR	W–L	Win %
Grand Slam tournaments
Australian	A	A	A	A	A	A	A	Not held			A	0 / 0	–	–
French	Only for French club members						Not held					0 / 0	–	–
Wimbledon	A	A	A	A	CR	A	Not held				A	0 / 1	7–1	87.5
U.S.	F_{A}	QF	CR	W_{C}	W	F	F	4R	A	A	QF	2 / 9	51–7	87.9
Win–loss	6–1	4–1	7–1	8–0	14–1	6–1	6–1	3–1			4–1	2 / 10	58–8	87.9
