= Mary Browne =

American tennis player

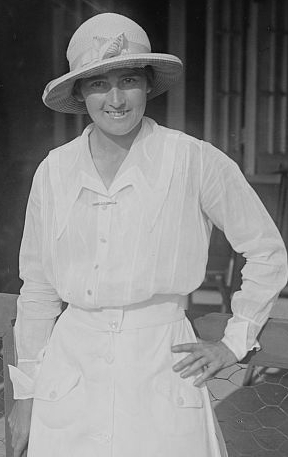
- Full name: Mary Kendall Browne
- Country (sports): United States
- Born: June 3, 1891 Ventura County, California, U.S.
- Died: August 19, 1971 (aged 80) Laguna Hills, U.S.
- Height: 5 ft 2 in (1.57 m)
- Plays: Right-handed
- Int. Tennis HoF: 1957 (member page)

Singles
- Highest ranking: No. 1 (U.S. Singles Ranking)

Grand Slam singles results
- French Open: F (1926)
- US Open: W (1912, 1913, 1914)

Doubles

Grand Slam doubles results
- Wimbledon: W (1926)
- US Open: W (1912, 1913, 1914, 1921, 1925)

Grand Slam mixed doubles results
- Wimbledon: F (1926)
- US Open: W (1912, 1913, 1914, 1921)

Mary Kendall Browne (June 3, 1891 – August 19, 1971) was an American professional tennis player and an amateur golfer. She was born in Ventura County, California.

== Biography ==
According to A. Wallis Myers of The Daily Telegraph and the Daily Mail, Browne was ranked in the world top 10 in 1921 (when the rankings began), 1924, and 1926, reaching a career high of world no. 3 in those rankings in 1921. Browne was included in the year-end top 10 rankings issued by the United States Lawn Tennis Association in 1913 (when the rankings began), 1914, 1921, 1924, and 1925. She was the top-ranked U.S. player in 1914. She also played golf and was runner-up at the 1924 U.S. Women's Amateur to champion Dorothy Campbell Hurd. She took part in the 1925 and 1926 editions of the Wightman Cup, an annual women's team tennis competition between the United States and Great Britain.

She later became a coach at the University of Chicago, where she is credited with inventing the backboard for use in practice. She later transferred to the University of Washington and then Lake Erie College.

She died in Laguna Hills on August 19, 1971, age 80, of complications from kidney failure.

Browne was inducted into the International Tennis Hall of Fame in 1957.

== Grand Slam finals ==
=== Singles (3 titles, 2 runners-up) ===
Result	Year	Championship	Surface	Opponent	Score
Win	1912	U.S. National Championships	Grass	(United States) Eleonora Sears	6–4, 6–2
Win	1913	U.S. National Championships	Grass	(United States) Dorothy Green	6–2, 7–5
Win	1914	U.S. National Championships	Grass	(United States) Marie Wagner	6–2, 1–6, 6–1
Loss	1921	U.S. National Championships	Grass	(United States) Molla Mallory	6–4, 4–6, 2–6
Loss	1926	French Championships	Clay	(France) Suzanne Lenglen	1–6, 0–6

=== Doubles (6 titles, 1 runner-up) ===
Result	Year	Championship	Surface	Partner	Opponents	Score
Win	1912	U.S. National Championships	Grass	(United States) Dorothy Green	(United States) Maud Barger-Wallach (United States) Mrs. Frederick Schmitz	6–2, 5–7, 6–0
Win	1913	U.S. National Championships	Grass	(United States) Louise Riddell Williams	(United States) Dorothy Green (United States) Edna Wildey	12–10, 2–6, 6–3
Win	1914	U.S. National Championships	Grass	(United States) Louise Riddell Williams	(United States) Louise Raymond (United States) Edna Wildey	10–8, 6–2
Win	1921	U.S. National Championships	Grass	(United States) Louise Riddell Williams	(United States) Helen Gilleaudeau (United States) Mrs. L.G. Morris	6–3, 6–2
Win	1925	U.S. National Championships	Grass	(United States) Helen Wills	(United States) May Sutton Bundy (United States) Elizabeth Ryan	6–4, 6–3
Win	1926	Wimbledon	Grass	(United States) Elizabeth Ryan	(United Kingdom) Evelyn Colyer (United Kingdom) Kitty McKane Godfree	6–1, 6–1
Loss	1926	U.S. National Championships	Grass	(United States) Charlotte Hosmer Chapin	(United States) Eleanor Goss (United States) Elizabeth Ryan	6–3, 4–6, 10–12

=== Mixed Doubles (4 titles, 1 runner-up) ===
Result	Year	Championship	Surface	Partner	Opponents	Score
Win	1912	U.S. National Championships	Grass	(United States) R. Norris Williams	(United States) Eleonora Sears (United States) Bill Clothier	6–4, 2–6, 11–9
Win	1913	U.S. National Championships	Grass	(United States) Bill Tilden	(United States) Dorothy Green (United Kingdom) C.S. Rogers	7–5, 7–5
Win	1914	U.S. National Championships	Grass	(United States) Bill Tilden	(United States) Margaretta Myers (United States) J. R. Rowland	6–1, 6–4
Win	1921	U.S. National Championships	Grass	(United States) Bill Johnston	(United States) Molla Bjurstedt Mallory (United States) Bill Tilden	3–6, 6–4, 6–3
Loss	1926	Wimbledon	Grass	(United States) Howard Kinsey	(United Kingdom) Kathleen McKane (United Kingdom) Leslie Godfree	3–6, 4–6

== Grand Slam singles tournament timeline ==
Key
W	F	SF	QF	#R	RR	Q#	DNQ	A	NH

(W) winner; (F) finalist; (SF) semifinalist; (QF) quarterfinalist; (#R) rounds 4, 3, 2, 1; (RR) round-robin stage; (Q#) qualification round; (DNQ) did not qualify; (A) absent; (NH) not held; (SR) strike rate (events won / competed); (W–L) win–loss record.

Tournament	1912	1913	1914	1915	1916	1917	1918	1919	1920	1921	1922	1923	1924	1925	1926	Career SR
Australian Championships	NH	NH	NH	NH	NH	NH	NH	NH	NH	NH	A	A	A	A	A	0 / 0
French Championships^{1}	A	A	A	NH	NH	NH	NH	NH	A	A	A	A	NH	A	F	0 / 1
Wimbledon	A	A	A	NH	NH	NH	NH	A	A	A	A	A	A	A	1R	0 / 1
U.S. Championships	W	W	W	A	A	A	A	A	A	F	A	A	SF	3R	SF	3 / 7
SR	1 / 1	1 / 1	1 / 1	0 / 0	0 / 0	0 / 0	0 / 0	0 / 0	0 / 0	0 / 1	0 / 0	0 / 0	0 / 1	0 / 1	0 / 3	3 / 9

^{1}Through 1923, the French Championships were open only to French nationals. The World Hard Court Championships (WHCC), actually played on clay in Paris or Brussels, began in 1912 and were open to all nationalities. The results from that tournament are shown here from 1912 through 1914 and from 1920 through 1923. The Olympics replaced the WHCC in 1924, as the Olympics were held in Paris. Beginning in 1925, the French Championships were open to all nationalities, with the results shown here beginning with that year.

== See also ==
- Performance timelines for all female tennis players since 1978 who reached at least one Grand Slam final
