= 1912 U.S. National Championships – Men's singles =

Men's singles
- 1912 U.S. National Championships

Final
- Champion: (United States) Maurice McLoughlin
- Runner-up: (United States) Wallace F. Johnson
- Score: 3–6, 2–6, 6–2, 6–4, 6–2

Events
Singles	men	women
Doubles	men	women
← 1911 ·	U.S. National Championships	· 1913 →

Maurice McLoughlin defeated Wallace F. Johnson 3–6, 2–6, 6–2, 6–4, 6–2 in the final to win the men's singles tennis title at the 1912 U.S. National Championships. The event was held at the Newport Casino in Newport, R.I. in the United States. The challenge round was abolished in this edition, thus requiring all participants, including the defending champion, to play the main draw. There were more than 128 players in the draw.

== Draw ==
=== Finals ===
Quarterfinals
(United States) R. Norris Williams	4	7	4	6	3
(United States) Maurice McLoughlin	6	5	7	3	6
(United States) William Clothier	7	6	6
(United States) Raymond Little	5	0	1
(United States) George Church	2	2	0
(United States) Karl Behr	6	6	6
(United States) Wallace F. Johnson	8	8	3	6
(United States) Watson Washburn	6	2	6	3

Semifinals
(United States) Maurice McLoughlin	8	6	3	6
(United States) William Clothier	6	2	6	4
(United States) Karl Behr	6	0	3	2
(United States) Wallace F. Johnson	4	6	6	6

Final
(United States) Maurice McLoughlin	3	2	7	6	6
(United States) Wallace F. Johnson	6	6	2	4	2

=== Earlier rounds ===
1st round - E. Pickman (United States) d. (United States) W. Burden 7-5,4-6,4-6,6-1,7-5
A. Man (United States) d. (United States) D. Codlington w/o
G. Gardner (United States) d. (United States) F. Sulloway 3-6,6-2,6-4,6-3
G. Caner (United States) d. (United States) H. Kleinschroth 4-6,9-7,6-2,6-2
E. Pendergast (United States) d. (United States) E. Champlin 6-1,6-3,6-1
N. Niles (United States) d. (United States) H. MacKinney 6-2,6-0,6-0
W. Roberts (United States) d. (United States) W. Hazard 6-4,6-2,6-3
R. Evans (United States) d. (United States) F. Letson 6-0,6-1,6-1
W. Bourne (United States) d. (United States) C. Beck 6-4,6-3,3-6,3-6,6-3
W. Rosenbaum (United States) d. (United States) H. Norton 6-3,6-3,6-2
C. Jones (United States) d. (United States) F. Easton 6-3,6-1,6-3
R. Stevens (United States) d. (United States) J. Quinn 6-0,6-0,6-2
J. Brown (United States) d. (United States) C. Neibel 6-1,6-3,6-1
R. Little (United States) d. (United States) G. Touchard 6-3,6-2,6-1
S. Miller (United States) d. (United States) W. Connell w/o
R. Dana (United States) d. (United States) W. Harrison 6-4,6-3,6-1
E. Peaslee (United States) d. (United States) E. Rodgers w/o
A. Devens (United States) d. (United States) R. McCloud 1-6,6-2,6-2,6-4
W. McKim (United States) d. (United States) L. Curtis 3-6,6-3,6-3,6-4
C. Lipscom (United States) d. (United States) W. Gilvenw/o
W. Pate (United States) d. (United States) G. Wightman 6-2,6-3,6-3
H. Boyer (United States) d. (United States) E. Miller w/o
R. Baggs (United States) d. (United States) R. Harte w/o
T. Bundy (United States) d. (United States) G. Adee w/o
J. Nelson (United States) d. (United States) F. Colston 6-2,6-2,2-6,11-9
G. Church (United States) d. (United States) R. Palmer w/o
S. McKean (United States) d. (United States) H. Carpenter w/o
R. Crouse (United States) d. (United States) G. MacKinney w/o
C. Cutting (United States) d. (United States) E. Frank w/o
A. Cragin (United States) d. (United States) R. Hazard 6-4,3-6,6-4,6-2
H. Register (United States) d. (United States) E. Boyer 6-2,6-1,6-1

2nd round - C. Biddle (United States) d. (United States) W. Brownell 6-1,6-1,6-1
R. Maynard (United States) d. (United States) E. Gould 6-1,6-1,6-4
R. N. Williams (United States) d. (United States) N. Vose 6-0,6-3,6-2
S. Parker (United States) d. (United States) J. DuBarry 6-0,6-1,6-2
W. Hall (United States) d. (United States) H. Stiness w/o
R. Gatewood (United States) d. (United States) H. Smith 4-6,2-6,6-4,7-5,6-3
C. Herd (United States) d. (United States) J. Weber w/o
W. Kuhn (United States) d. (United States) H. Thomas w/o
M. Charlock (United States) d. (United States) A. Phillips 6-1,6-1,6-2
J. Hubbard (United States) d. (United States) W. Parsons
H. Slocum (United States) d. (United States) E. Stille 6-0,6-1,6-1
R. Seabury (United States) d. (United States) H. Simmons 15-13,5-7,6-2,6-3
F. Washburn (United States) d. (United States) W. Preston w/o
M. McLoughlin (United States) d. (United States) F. McNair 6-0,6-2,6-1
J. Montgomery (United States) d. (United States) W. Williams 6-3,6-4,6-2
A. Kennedy jr (United States) d. (United States) R. Auspitzer w/o
J. Williams (United States) d. (United States) G. Taylor 6-2,6-1,6-1
M. Whiting (United States) d. (United States) E. Leonard w/o
W. Preston (United States) d. (United States) H. Braley w/o
H. Harvey (United States) d. (United States) R. Griswold 6-1,6-2,6-4
C. Frailey (United States) d. (United States) C. Amory w/o
G. Beals (United States) d. (United States) A. Tobey 6-2,9-7,6-3
E. Larned (United States) d. (United States) P. Gibson 6-1,6-2,6-1
W. Clothier (United States) d. (United States) J. Reese 6-0,6-1,6-0
A. Man (United States) d. (United States) E. Pickman
G. Gardner (United States) d. (United States) G. Caner 6-2,6-1,6-2
N. Niles (United States) d. (United States) E. Pendergast
R. Evans (United States) d. (United States) W. Roberts
W. Rosenbaum (United States) d. (United States) W. Bourne
R. Stevens (United States) d. (United States) C. Jones
R. Little (United States) d. (United States) J. Brown
R. Dana (United States) d. (United States) S. Miller
E. Peaslee (United States) d. (United States) A. Devens
W. McKim (United States) d. (United States) C. Lipscom
W. Pate (United States) d. (United States) H. Boyer 6-0,6-0,6-1
T. Bundy (United States) d. (United States) R. Baggs 6-3,6-1,6-1
G. Church (United States) d. (United States) J. Nelson
S. McKean (United States) d. (United States) R. Crouse 6-3,6-2,6-3
C. Cutting (United States) d. (United States) A. Cragin 7-5,6-3,9-7
H. Register (United States) d. (United States) E. Torrey 6-4,6-2,6-0
K. Behr (United States) d. (United States) S. R. Smith 6-1,6-2,6-3
A. Hammett (United States) d. (United States) C. Leonard
A. Kennedy (United States) d. (United States) D. Mathey w/o
V. Ward (United States) d. (United States) S. Frelinghuysen w/o
C. Rogers (United States) d. (United States) W. Dean 6-0,6-1,6-4
E. Law (United States) d. (United States) P. Foster 6-2,6-4,6-2
R. Cowan (United States) d. (United States) R. Thayer 6-3,6-2,6-1
C. Porter (United States) d. (United States) P. Roberts 6-2,2-6,8-6,6-3
H. Webber (United States) d. (United States) S. Merrihew 6-4,2-6,6-4,6-3
W. Johnson (United States) d. (United States) W. M. Tilden 6-2,6-3,6-4
F. Paul (United States) d. (United States) M. Taylor 6-1,6-3,6-4
J. Carpenter (United States) d. (United States) G. Adams w/o
J. Cushman (United States) d. (United States) J. Downey w/o
A. Dabney (United States) d. (United States) F. Harris w/o
H. Voshell (United States) d. (United States) G. Knowlton 6-1,6-2,6-0
F. Inman (United States) d. (United States) A. Sands 6-3,6-2,6-2
H. Johnson (United States) d. (United States) G. Phillips 6-1,6-4,6-1
H. Nickerson (United States) d. (United States) M. Volek 6-4,6-0,6-0
W. Washburn (United States) d. (United States) H. Taylor w/o
W. Izard (United States) d. (United States) F. Feitshans 8-6,6-1,6-2
S. Henshaw (United States) d. (United States) B. Wright w/o
J. Devereux (United States) d. (United States) H. Colton w/o
H. Ewer (United States) d. (United States) W. Heyl 6-4,6-3,6-3
R. Seaver (United States) d. (United States) M. Hamilton 6-1,6-1,6-2

3rd round - C. Biddle (United States) d. (United States) R. Maynard 6-0,6-2,6-1
R. N. Williams (United States) d. (United States) S. Parker 6-3,6-2,6-1
W. Hall (United States) d. (United States) R. Gatewood 6-3,6-3,6-2
C. Herd (United States) d. (United States) W. Kuhn 6-4,6-3,2-6,6-3
M. Charlock (United States) d. (United States) J. Hubbard 6-0,6-0,6-2
H. Slocum (United States) d. (United States) R. Seabury 6-4,6-0,3-6,6-2
M. McLoughlin (United States) d. (United States) F. Washburn 6-0,6-2,6-1
J. Montgomery (United States) d. (United States) A. Kennedy jr w/o
M. Whiting (United States) d. (United States) J. Williams 2-6,4-6,6-2,12-10,13-11
W. Preston (United States) d. (United States) H. Harvey 6-0,3-6,6-4,6-4
G. Beals (United States) d. (United States) C. Frailey 6-3,6-1,6-3
W. Clothier (United States) d. (United States) E. Larned 7-5,6-4,12-10
G. Gardner (United States) d. (United States) A. Man 6-4,6-1,4-6,6-3
N. Niles (United States) d. (United States) R. Evans 6-1,6-4,6-4
R. Stevens (United States) d. (United States) W. Rosenbaum 6-4,6-4,6-4
R. Little (United States) d. (United States) R. Dana 7-5,6-2,6-1
W. McKim (United States) d. (United States) E. Peaslee 6-4,0-6,6-2,11-3,6-2
T. Bundy (United States) d. (United States) W. Pate 6-0,6-0,6-2
G. Church (United States) d. (United States) S. McKean 6-0,6-3,6-0
C. Cutting (United States) d. (United States) H. Register 6-2,6-3,6-4
K. Behr (United States) d. (United States) A. Hammett 6-2,8-6,6-4
V. Ward (United States) d. (United States) A. Kennedy 6-4,6-2,7-5
C. Rogers (United States) d. (United States) E. Law 6-1,6-1,6-1
C. Porter (United States) d. (United States) R. Cowan 2-6,6-4,6-2,7-5
W. Johnson (United States) d. (United States) H. Webber 6-1,6-2,6-2
J. Carpenter (United States) d. (United States) F. Paul 6-0,6-8,6-0,6-1
A. Dabney (United States) d. (United States) J. Cushman 4-6,6-1,6-8,6-3,6-2
F. Inman (United States) d. (United States) H. Voshell 6-3,9-7,6-3
H. Johnson (United States) d. (United States) H. Nickerson 6-8,6-3,6-4,6-2
W. Washburn (United States) d. (United States) W. Izard 2-6,6-1,7-5,6-4
S. Henshaw (United States) d. (United States) J. Devereux 4-6,9-7,6-4,7-5
R. Seaver (United States) d. (United States) H. Ewer 6-1,6-2,6-8,6-1

4th round - R. N. Williams (United States) d. (United States) C. Biddle 7-9,6-3,6-0,6-0
C. Herd (United States) d. (United States) W. Hall 6-4,7-5,7-5
H. Slocum (United States) d. (United States) M. Charlock 6-2,6-0,6-2
M. McLoughlin (United States) d. (United States) J. Montgomery 6-1,6-2,6-3
W. Preston (United States) d. (United States) M. Whiting 9-7,6-4,6-3
W. Clothier (United States) d. (United States) G. Beals 6-1,8-6,6-0
G. Gardner (United States) d. (United States) N. Niles 6-3,4-6,4-6,6-1,6-3
R. Little (United States) d. (United States) R. Stevens 6-0,6-1,6-0
T. Bundy (United States) d. (United States) W. McKim 6-0,6-2,6-4
G. Church (United States) d. (United States) C. Cutting 6-4,4-6,6-1,4-6,6-1
K. Behr (United States) d. (United States) V. Ward 6-3,6-2,6-2
C. Rogers (United States) d. (United States) C. Porter 6-3,6-0,6-1
W. Johnson (United States) d. (United States) J. Carpenter 6-3,6-0,6-1
A. Dabney (United States) d. (United States) F. Inman 6-1,6-4,4-6,6-2
W. Washburn (United States) d. (United States) H. Johnson 4-6,6-2,6-3,9-7
R. Seaver (United States) d. (United States) S. Henshaw 6-1,6-2,6-3

5th round - R. N. Williams (United States) d. (United States) C. Herd 6-1,6-1,6-1
M. McLoughlin (United States) d. (United States) H. Slocum 6-1,6-4,6-2
W. Clothier (United States) d. (United States) W. Preston 6-1,6-1,6-1
R. Little (United States) d. (United States) G. Gardner 6-4,7-5,6-2
G. Church (United States) d. (United States) T. Bundy w/o
K. Behr (United States) d. (United States) C. Rogers 7-5,6-4,6-4
W. Johnson (United States) d. (United States) A. Dabney 6-4,6-2,6-1
W. Washburn (United States) d. (United States) R. Seaver 10-12,6-4,6-1,6-3

Preceded by 1912 Wimbledon Championships – Men's singles	Grand Slam men's singles	Succeeded by 1913 Australasian Championships – Men's singles
