= Wallace F. Johnson =

American tennis player

- Full name: Wallace Ford Johnson
- Country (sports): United States
- Born: July 13, 1889 Philadelphia, Pennsylvania, United States
- Died: February 15, 1971 (aged 81) Philadelphia, Pennsylvania, United States
- Turned pro: 1929 (amateur tour from 1904)
- Retired: 1930
- Plays: Right-handed (1-handed backhand)
- College: University of Pennsylvania

Singles
- Highest ranking: No. 8 (1913, E.B. Dewhurst)

Grand Slam singles results
- Wimbledon: 4R (1913)
- US Open: F (1912, 1921)
- Professional majors
- US Pro: QF (1929)

Grand Slam mixed doubles results
- US Open: W (1907, 1909, 1911, 1920)

Team competitions
- Davis Cup: W (1913)

Wallace Ford Johnson (July 13, 1889 – February 15, 1971) of Philadelphia was an American tennis player in the early 20th century.

== Career ==
Johnson played collegiate tennis at the University of Pennsylvania, where in 1909 he won NCAA championships in both singles, against Melville H. Long, and doubles.

At the U.S. National Championships, Johnson reached the singles final in both 1912 and 1921 before falling to future International Tennis Hall of Famers Maurice McLoughlin and Bill Tilden. He also won U.S. mixed doubles championships in 1907, 1909, 1911, and 1920. All but his 1907 title came with Hazel Hotchkiss Wightman; the 1907 title was with May Sayers. Johnson was ranked the U.S. No. 4 in 1922 and World No. 8 in 1913 by Dr. E.B. Dewhurst.

He also played on the U.S. Davis Cup team in 1913 defeating the German Oskar Kreuzer in the semifinal round.

At the Cincinnati Open, Johnson paired with Richard H. Palmer to win the doubles title in 1910 and reach the doubles final in 1911, and was a singles finalist in 1910 and a singles semifinalist in 1911.

Johnson coached the University of Pennsylvania men's tennis team from 1929 until 1959. Johnson also served as Penn's men's squash coach for 30 years (1929–54, 56–59) and guided LeRoy Lewis to the National Squash Championship in 1937 and 1938.

In 1999, Johnson was posthumously enshrined into the ITA Collegiate Tennis Hall of Fame, and in 2008 he was enshrined into the USTA/Middle States Section Hall of Fame.

== Grand Slam finals ==
=== Singles (2 runner-ups) ===
Result	Year	Championship	Surface	Opponent	Score
Loss	1912	U.S. Championships	Grass	(United States) Maurice E. McLoughlin	6–3, 6–2, 2–6, 4–6, 2–6
Loss	1921	U.S. Championships	Grass	(United States) Bill Tilden	1–6, 3–6, 1–6

=== Mixed doubles (4 titles) ===
Result	Year	Championship	Surface	Partner	Opponents	Score
Win	1907	U.S. Championships	Grass	(United States) May Sayers	(United States) Natalie Wildey (United States) Herbert M. Tilden	6–1, 7–5
Win	1909	U.S. Championships	Grass	(United States) Hazel Hotchkiss Wightman	(United States) Louise Hammond Raymond (United States) Raymond Little	6–2, 6–0
Win	1911	U.S. Championships	Grass	(United States) Hazel Hotchkiss Wightman	(United States) Edna Wildey (United States) Herbert M. Tilden	6–4, 6–4
Win	1920	U.S. Championships	Grass	(United States) Hazel Hotchkiss Wightman	(United States) Molla Bjurstedt Mallory (United States) Craig Biddle	6–4, 6–3

== Singles performance timeline ==
Key
W	F	SF	QF	#R	RR	Q#	DNQ	A	NH

(W) winner; (F) finalist; (SF) semifinalist; (QF) quarterfinalist; (#R) rounds 4, 3, 2, 1; (RR) round-robin stage; (Q#) qualification round; (DNQ) did not qualify; (A) absent; (NH) not held; (SR) strike rate (events won / competed); (W–L) win–loss record.

Events with a challenge round: (W_{C}) won; (CR) lost the challenge round; (F_{A}) all comers' finalist

	1904	1905	1906	1907	1908	1909	1910	1911	1912	1913	1914	1915	1916	1917	1918	1919	1920	1921	1922	1923	1924	1925	1926	1927	1928	1929	1930	SR	W–L	Win %
Grand Slam tournaments																												0 / 24	55–24	69.6
Australian	NH	A	A	A	A	A	A	A	A	A	A	A	Not held			A	A	A	A	A	A	A	A	A	A	A	A	0 / 0	–	–
French	Only for French club members											Not held					Only for French club members					A	A	A	A	A	A	0 / 0	–	–
Wimbledon	A	A	A	A	A	A	A	A	A	4R	A	Not held				A	A	A	A	A	A	A	A	A	A	A	A	0 / 1	2–1	66.7
U.S.	3R	3R	2R	QF	4R	4R	2R	3R	F	SF	QF	2R	QF	A	A	SF	SF	F	4R	1R	QF	QF	1R	1R	1R	A	A	0 / 23	53–23	69.7
Pro Slam tournaments																												0 / 2	3–2	60.0
U.S. Pro	Not held																							A	A	QF	3R	0 / 2	3–2	60.0
French Pro	Not held																										A	0 / 0	–	–
Wembley Pro	Not held																											0 / 0	–	–
Win–loss	0–1	1–1	0–1	3–1	2–1	3–1	0–1	1–1	6–1	6–2	4–1	1–1	3–1			5–1	4–1	6–1	3–1	0–1	4–1	3–1	0–1	0–1	0–1	2–1	1–1	0 / 26	58–26	69.0
