= R. Norris Williams =

American tennis player (1891–1968)

Richard Norris Williams
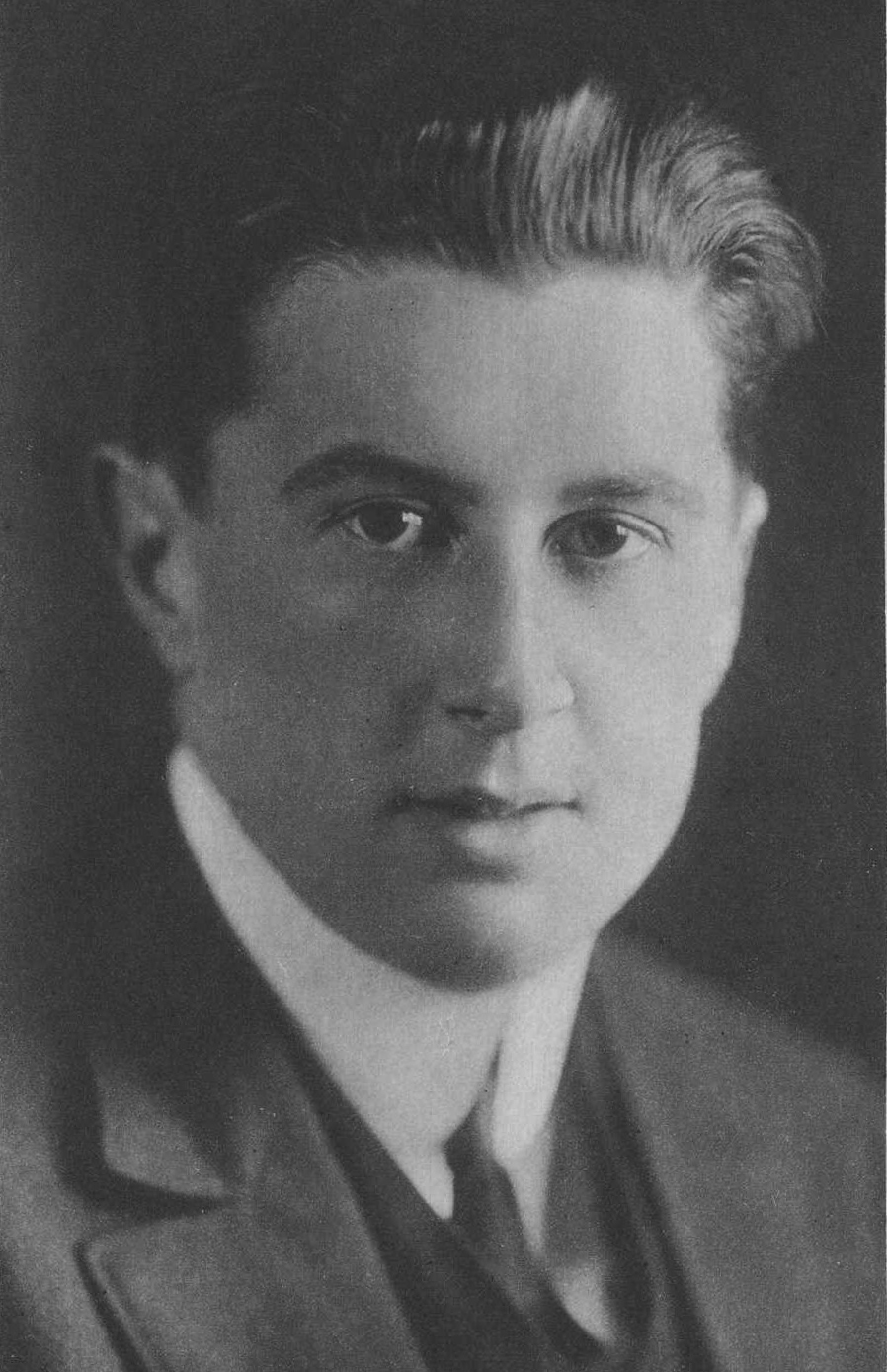
- Full name: Richard Norris Williams II
- Country (sports): United States
- Born: January 29, 1891 Geneva, Switzerland
- Died: June 2, 1968 (aged 77) Philadelphia, Pennsylvania, U.S.
- Plays: Right-handed (one-handed backhand)
- Int. Tennis HoF: 1957 (member page)

Singles
- Career record: 205–75
- Career titles: 26
- Highest ranking: No. 1 (1916 USLTA)

Grand Slam singles results
- Wimbledon: SF (1924)
- US Open: W (1914, 1916)

Other tournaments
- Olympic Games: QF (1924)

Grand Slam doubles results
- Wimbledon: W (1920)
- US Open: W (1925, 1926)

Grand Slam mixed doubles results
- Wimbledon: QF (1924)
- US Open: W (1912)
Medal record
Men's tennis
Representing the United States
Olympic Games
Gold medal – first place	1924 Paris	Mixed doubles

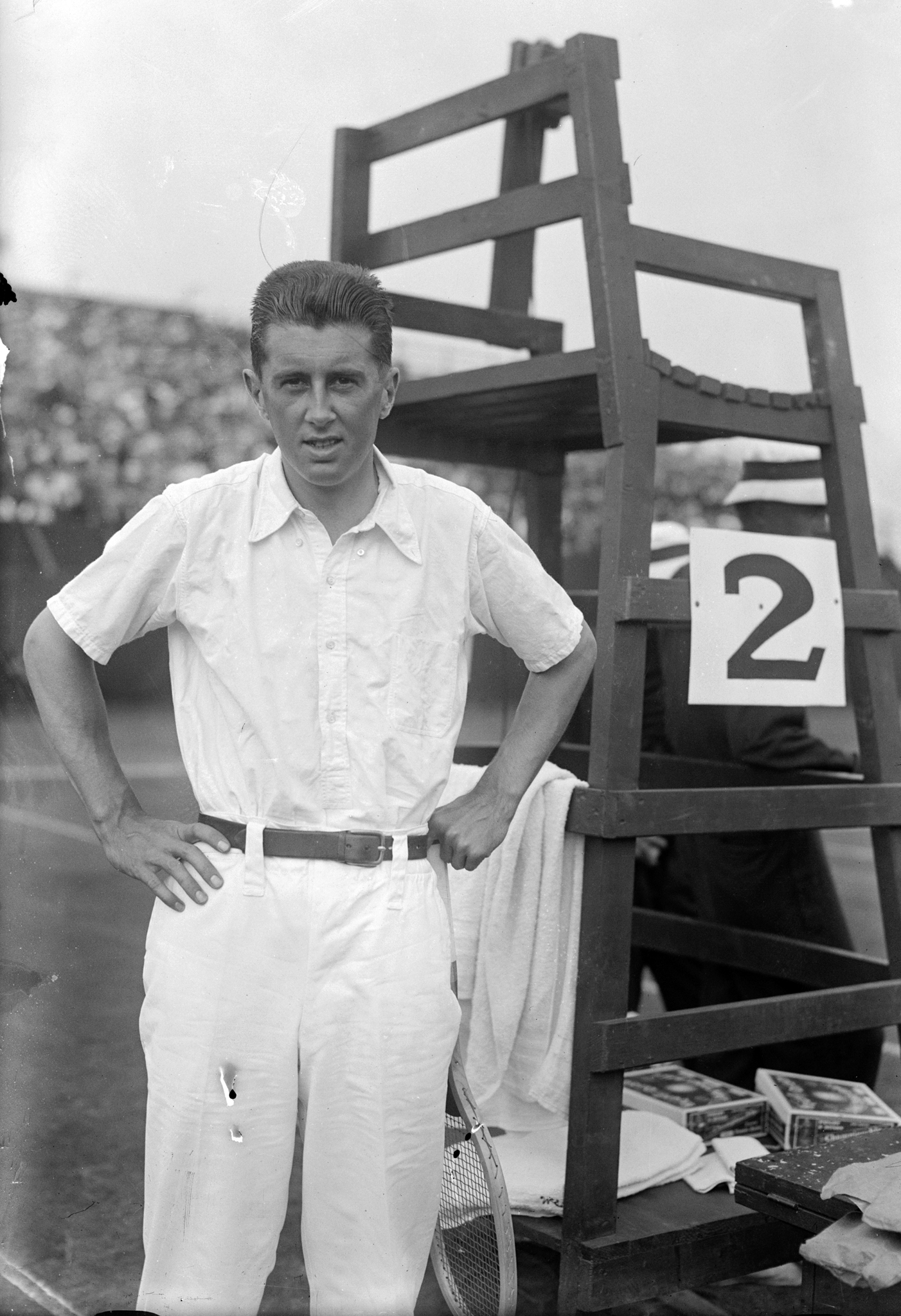
Williams in 1916 at his match against Bill Johnston

Richard Norris Williams II (January 29, 1891 – June 2, 1968), generally known as R. Norris Williams, was an American tennis player and passenger aboard RMS Titanic. He survived the sinking of the Titanic. He won the U.S. National Tennis Championships in men's singles in 1914 and 1916. He was ranked the U.S. No. 1 player for 1916 by the USLTA, and world No. 2 for 1914.

== Biography ==
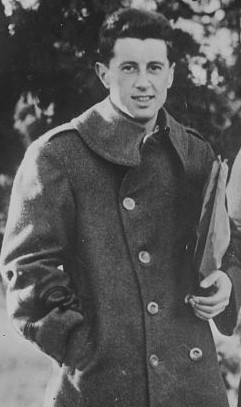
Richard Norris Williams II

Williams was born in Geneva, Switzerland, the son of Philadelphia parents Charles Duane Williams, a direct descendant from Benjamin Franklin, and Lydia Biddle White. He was tutored privately at a Swiss boarding school and spoke fluent French and German. He started playing tennis at age 12, mainly under the guidance of his father.

On January 11, 1919, in Paris, France, Williams married Jean Haddock (1890–1929), daughter of Arthur Henry and Matilda (Stewart) Haddock. They had four children. Jean died aged 38 on April 20, 1929, in Philadelphia. Williams remarried Frances West Gillmore (1908–2001), daughter of Major General Quincy Adams Gillmore II and Frances West (Hemsley) Gillmore, on October 2, 1930. She was a great-granddaughter of Quincy Adams Gillmore.

== Tennis career ==
In 1911, Williams won the Swiss Championship. A year later, he entered Harvard University and became the intercollegiate tennis champion in singles (1913, 1915) and doubles (1914, 1915).

In 1913, Williams lost to Maurice McLoughlin at both the Wimbledon Championships and at the U.S. Championships.

Williams is best known for his two men's singles titles at the U.S. Championships. In 1914 he defeated Bill Johnston in the second round and McLoughlin in the final. In 1916 he defeated Bill Johnston in the final.

Williams also won the U.S. Clay Court Championships in 1912 and again in 1915. He won the Pennsylvania Lawn Tennis Championships at the Merion Cricket Club on grass in 1912 defeating eight-time champion Wallace F. Johnson in the final and again in 1914 defeating Bill Tilden in the final. In 1925 he won the Newport Casino Championships defeating McLoughlin in the final.

In 1920, after returning from WWI, Williams won at Norwood on grass in Britain in 1920 defeating Johnston, the ranking world No. 1 at that time, in the semifinal and James Cecil Parke, the world ranked No. 4 for that year, in the final. In 1922 at Glen Cove, Long Island, N.Y. on grass Williams won the Nassau Bowl defeating Frank Hunter in the final in three straight sets.

At age 36, Williams won the Pennsylvania Lawn Tennis Championships at Merion Cricket Club again in 1927 defeating Manuel Alonso Areizaga, ranked world No. 5 for that year, in the final in four sets.

He was also on the victorious American Davis Cup team twice: in 1925 and 1926 and was considered a fine doubles player.

During the 1924 Olympics, at the age of 33 (and with a sprained ankle), Richard Norris Williams became a gold medalist in the mixed doubles, partnering Hazel Hotchkiss Wightman. He went on to captain several winning Davis Cup teams from 1921 through 1926 as well as the 1934 team. At age 44, he retired from Championship Tennis.

=== Rankings ===
Williams was ranked among the world's top ten from 1912 to 1914, reaching No. 2 in 1914, and again from 1919 to 1923. In the U.S. he was ranked No. 2 by the USLTA for four straight years from 1912 to 1915 and reached U.S. No. 1 in 1916. Williams was ranked U.S. No. 3 by the USLTA in 1920 and again in 1923.

=== Style ===
Williams had a reputation in singles of always hitting as hard as possible and always trying to hit winners near the lines. This made him an extremely erratic player, but when his game was sporadically "on", he was considered unbeatable. New York Times tennis writer Allison Danzig claimed that Williams had “one of the most daring attacks tennis had seen. He never played safe. He stood in close, took the ball on the rise, often on the half volley, and played for the lines.” “At his best he was unbeatable, and more dazzling than Tilden."

He was inducted into the International Tennis Hall of Fame (Newport, Rhode Island) in 1957.

== RMS Titanic ==
Williams also gained fame as being a survivor of the RMS Titanic disaster in April 1912. He and his father, Charles Duane Williams, were traveling first class on the liner when it struck an iceberg and sank. Shortly after the collision, Williams freed a trapped passenger from a cabin by breaking down a door. He was reprimanded by a steward, who threatened to fine him for damaging White Star Line property, an event that inspired a scene in James Cameron's film Titanic (1997). Williams remained on the doomed liner almost until the very end. At one point Williams' father tried to get a steward to fill his flask. The flask was given to Williams and remains in the Williams family.

As Titanic began her final plunge, father and son jumped into the water. While Dick was able to save himself, his father was killed by the first funnel falling from the ship. Williams stated, "I saw one of the four great funnels come crashing down on top of him. Just for one instant I stood there transfixed – not because it had only missed me by a few feet … curiously enough not because it had killed my father for whom I had a far more than normal feeling of love and attachment; but there I was transfixed wondering at the enormous size of this funnel, still belching smoke. It seemed to me that two cars could have been driven through it side by side." He made his way to the partially submerged Collapsible A, holding onto its side for quite a while before getting in. When Williams entered the water, he was wearing a fur coat which he quickly discarded along with his shoes. Those in Collapsible A who survived were eventually picked up by Fifth Officer Harold Lowe on Lifeboat No. 14 and taken to RMS Carpathia. Although abandoned by RMS Carpathia, Collapsible A was recovered a month later by RMS Oceanic. On board the lifeboat was the discarded fur coat which was returned to Williams by the White Star Line.

After entering the lifeboat, he spent several hours knee-deep in the freezing water. Carpathia arrived on the scene to rescue survivors. The ordeal left his legs so severely frostbitten that the Carpathia's doctor wanted to amputate them. Williams, who did not want his tennis career to be cut short, opted instead to work through the injury by simply getting up and walking around every two hours, around the clock. The choice worked out well for him: later that year, he won his first U.S. Tennis Championship, in mixed doubles, and went on to win many more championships including the Davis Cup with fellow survivor Karl Behr.

It was not until after the publication of A Night to Remember (1955), a book about the Titanic disaster, that Williams became acquainted with its author Walter Lord. In 1962, Williams met with Lord and gave a detailed account of the sinking.

== Military service, business career, historical society ==
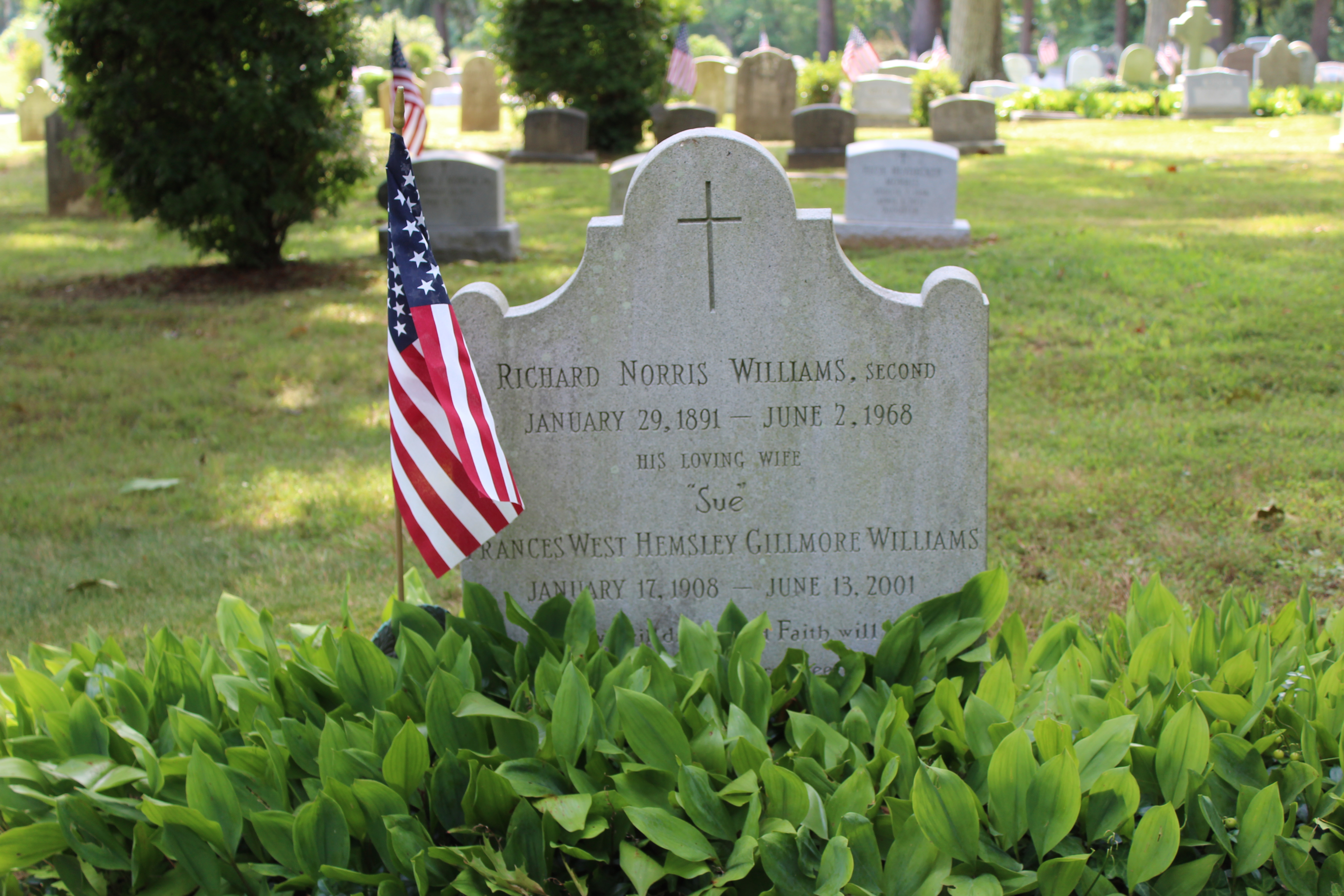
R. Norris Williams Tombstone in St. David's Episcopal Church graveyard

Williams served in the United States Army during World War I and was awarded the Croix de Guerre and the Legion of Honor. After the war, he continued playing championship tennis.

Williams, also a noted Philadelphia investment banker, was president of the Historical Society of Pennsylvania.

=== Death ===
Richard Norris Williams died of emphysema on June 2, 1968, aged 77, in Bryn Mawr, Pennsylvania. He was interred at St. David's Episcopal Church in Radnor, Pennsylvania.

== Grand Slam finals ==
=== Singles: 3 (2 titles, 1 runner-up) ===
Result	Year	Championship	Surface	Opponent	Score
Loss	1913	U.S. National Championships	Grass	(United States) Maurice McLoughlin	4–6, 7–5, 3–6, 1–6
Win	1914	U.S. National Championships	Grass	(United States) Maurice McLoughlin	6–3, 8–6, 10–8
Win	1916	U.S. National Championships	Grass	(United States) Bill Johnston	4–6, 6–4, 0–6, 6–2, 6–4

=== Doubles: 7 (3 titles, 4 runners-up) ===
Result	Year	Championship	Surface	Partner	Opponents	Score
Win	1920	Wimbledon	Grass	(United States) Chuck Garland	(United Kingdom) Algernon Kingscote (United Kingdom of Great Britain and Ireland) James Parke	4–6, 6–4, 7–5, 6–2
Loss	1921	U.S. National Championships	Grass	(United States) Watson Washburn	(United States) Vincent Richards (United States) Bill Tilden	11–13, 10–12, 1–6
Loss	1923	U.S. National Championships	Grass	(United States) Watson Washburn	(United Kingdom) Brian Norton (United States) Bill Tilden	6–3, 2–6, 3–6, 7–5, 2–6
Loss	1924	Wimbledon	Grass	(United States) Watson Washburn	(United States) Frank Hunter (United States) Vincent Richards	3–6, 6–3, 10–8, 6–8, 3–6
Win	1925	U.S. National Championships	Grass	(United States) Vincent Richards	(United States) Gerald Patterson (United States) John Hawkes	6–2, 8–10, 6–4, 11–9
Win	1926	U.S. National Championships	Grass	(United States) Vincent Richards	(United States) Bill Tilden (United States) Alfred Chapin	6–4, 6–8, 11–9, 6–3
Loss	1927	U.S. National Championships	Grass	(United States) Bill Johnston	(United States) Frank Hunter (United States) Bill Tilden	8–10, 3–6, 3–6

=== Mixed doubles: 1 title ===
Result	Year	Championship	Surface	Partner	Opponents	Score
Win	1912	U.S. National Championships	Grass	(United States) Mary Browne	(United States) Eleonora Sears (United States) Bill Clothier	6–4, 2–6, 11–9

== Singles performance timeline ==
Key
W	F	SF	QF	#R	RR	Q#	P#	DNQ	A	Z#	PO	G	S	B	NMS	NTI	P	NH

(W) winner; (F) finalist; (SF) semifinalist; (QF) quarterfinalist; (#R) rounds 4, 3, 2, 1; (RR) round-robin stage; (Q#) qualification round; (P#) preliminary round; (DNQ) did not qualify; (A) absent; (Z#) Davis/Fed Cup Zonal Group (with number indication) or (PO) play-off; (G) gold, (S) silver or (B) bronze Olympic/Paralympic medal; (NMS) not a Masters tournament; (NTI) not a Tier I tournament; (P) postponed; (NH) not held; (SR) strike rate (events won / competed); (W–L) win–loss record.

Events with a challenge round: (W_{C}) won; (CR) lost the challenge round; (F_{A}) all comers' finalist

	1912		1913	1914	1915	1916	1917	1918	1919	1920	1921	1922	1923	1924	1925	1926	1927	1928	1929	1930	1931	1932	1933	1934	1935	SR	W–L	Win %
Grand Slam tournaments
French	OF		OF	OF	Not held					Only for French club members					A	A	A	A	A	A	A	A	A	A	A	0 / 0	–	–
Wimbledon	A		4R	A	Not held				A	QF	A	A	A	SF	A	A	A	A	A	A	A	A	A	2R	A	0 / 4	12–4	75.0
U.S.	QF		F	W	SF	W	SF	A	SF	4R	4R	QF	QF	2R	SF	QF	A	1R	QF	4R	2R	3R	2R	A	2R	2 / 21	65–19	77.4
Australian	A		A	A	A	Not held			A	A	A	A	A	A	A	A	A	A	A	A	A	A	A	A	A	0 / 0	–	–
Win–loss	4–1		8–2	6–0	4–1	7–0	4–1		5–1	7–2	3–1	4–1	2–1	5–2	4–1	3–1		0–1	3–1	2–1	1–1	2–1	1–1	1–1	1–1	2 / 25	77–23	77.0
National representation
Olympics	A	A	Not held							A	Not held			QF	Not held											0 / 1	3–1	75.0
