= Dorothy Green (tennis) =

American tennis player

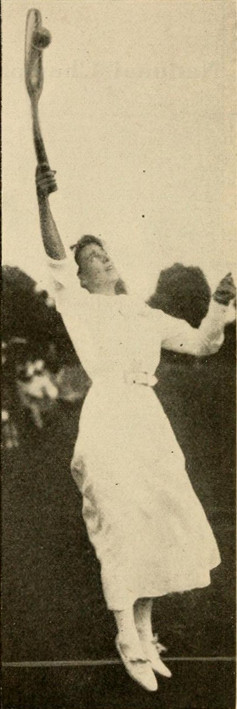
- Green in 1911
- Country (sports): United States
- Born: 31 March 1887
- Died: 13 December 1964 (aged 78)

Singles

Grand Slam singles results
- US Open: F (1913)

Doubles

Grand Slam doubles results
- US Open: W (1912)

Grand Slam mixed doubles results
- US Open: F (1913)

Dorothy Green (March 31, 1887 – December 13, 1964) was an American tennis player of the start of the 20th century.

In 1912, she won the women's doubles at the US Women's National Championship with Mary Kendall Browne, who beat her the following year in the singles final.

Green was a member of the Merion Cricket Club.

== Grand Slam finals ==
=== Singles (1 runner-up) ===
Result	Year	Championship	Surface	Opponent	Score
Loss	1913	U.S. National Championships	Grass	(United States) Mary Browne	2–6, 5–7

=== Doubles (1 title, 3 runner-ups) ===
Result	Year	Championship	Surface	Partner	Opponents	Score
Loss	1909	U.S. National Championships	Grass	(Canada) Lois Moyes	(United States) Hazel Hotchkiss (United States) Edith Rotch	1–6, 1–6
Loss	1911	U.S. National Championships	Grass	(United States) Florence Sutton	(United States) Hazel Hotchkiss (United States) Eleonora Sears	4–6, 6–4, 2–6
Win	1912	U.S. National Championships	Grass	(United States) Mary Browne	(United States) Maud Barger-Wallach (United States) Mrs. Frederick Schmitz	6–2, 5–7, 6–0
Loss	1913	U.S. National Championships	Grass	(United States) Edna Wildey	(United States) Mary Browne (United States) Louise Riddell Williams	10–12, 6–2, 3–6

=== Mixed doubles ===
Result	Year	Championship	Surface	Partner	Opponents	Score
Loss	1913	U.S. National Championships	Grass	(United Kingdom) C.S. Rogers	(United States) Mary Browne (United States) Bill Tilden	5–7, 5–7
