= List of US Open women's doubles champions =

US Open Women's Doubles Champions
- Location: Flushing Meadows, Queens; New York City; United States
- Venue: USTA Billie Jean King National Tennis Center
- Governing body: USTA
- Created: 1889; 137 years ago
- Editions: 137 events (2025); 58 events (Open Era)
- Surface: Grass (1889–1974); Clay (Note: Played on HarTru surface.) (1975–1977); Hard (Note: Played on DecoTurf surface.) (1978–present)
- Prize money: Total: US$65,000,000 (2023); Winner: US$700,000 (2023)
- Trophy: US Open Trophy
- Website: Official website

Current champion
- Kateřina Siniaková; Taylor Townsend

The following pairings won the US Open tennis championship at Women's Doubles.

== Champions ==
=== U.S. National Championships ===
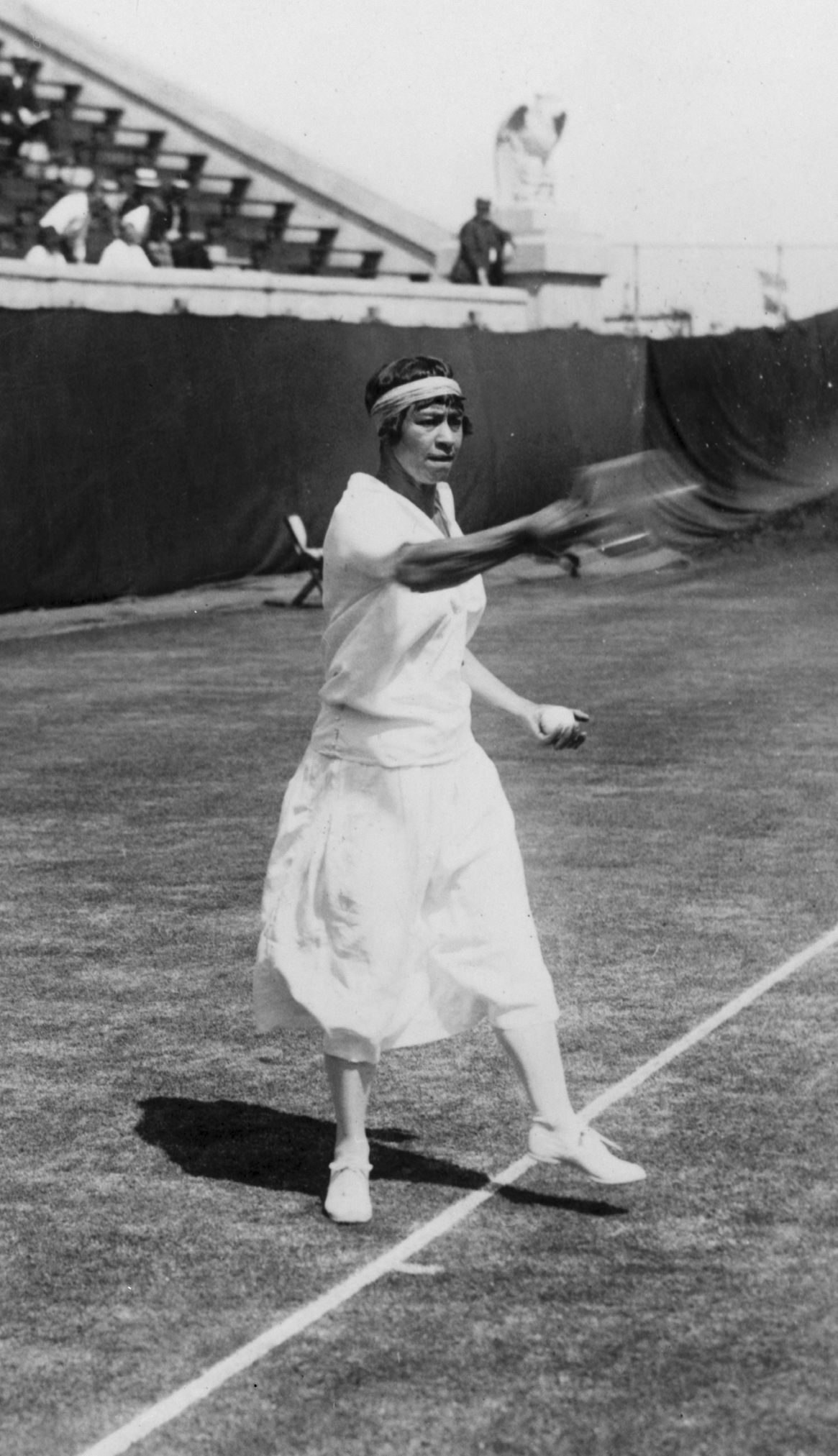
Molla Bjurstedt Mallory won the women's doubles title in 1916 and 1917 together with Eleonora Sears

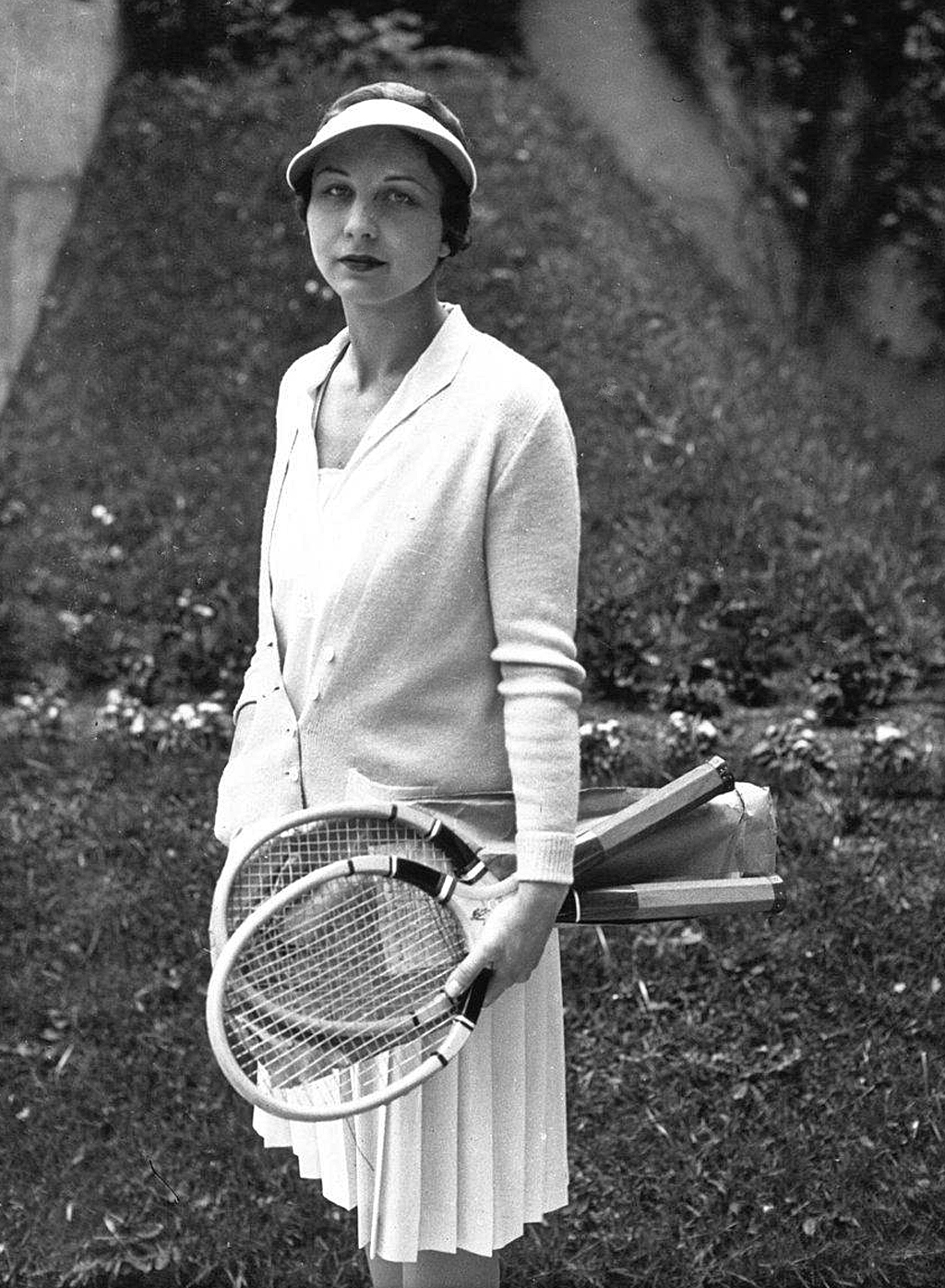
Helen Wills Moody won the women's doubles title four times in the interbellum years

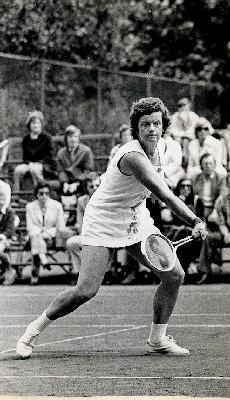
Dutch player Betty Stöve won the doubles title in 1977 and 1979

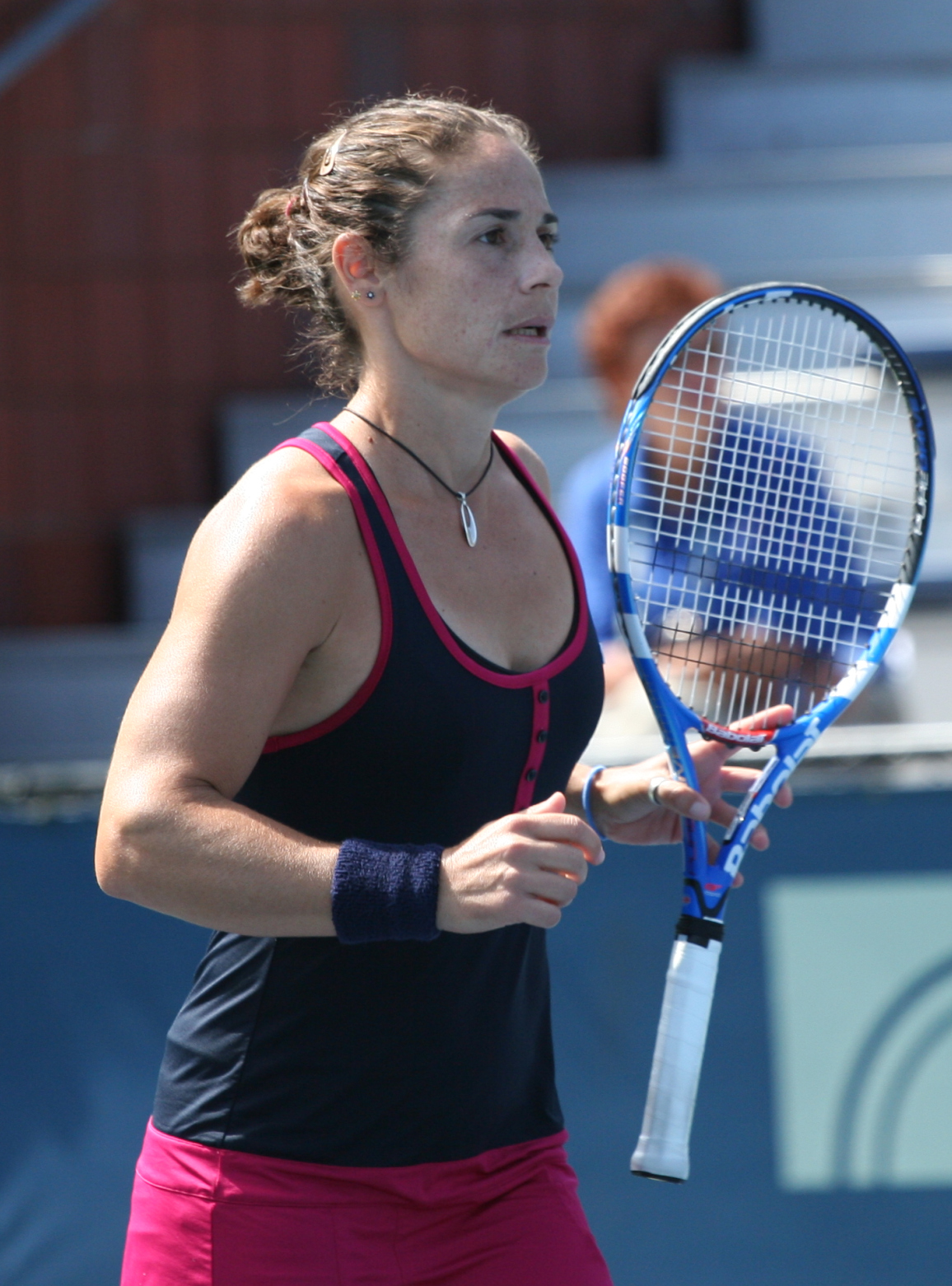
Virginia Ruano Pascual won 10 women's doubles titles in her career and three of those were at the US Open

Year	Champions	Runners-up	Score
1889	(United States) Bertha Townsend (United States) Margarette Ballard	(United States) Marian Wright (United States) Laura Knight	6–0, 6–2
1890	(United States) Ellen Roosevelt (United States) Grace Roosevelt	(United States) Bertha Townsend (United States) Margarette Ballard	6–1, 6–2
1891	(United Kingdom) Mabel Cahill (United States) Emma Leavitt-Morgan	(United States) Ellen Roosevelt (United States) Grace Roosevelt	2–6, 8–6, 6–4
1892	(United Kingdom) Mabel Cahill (United States) Adeline McKinlay	(United States) Helen Day Harris (United States) Amy Williams	6–1, 6–3
1893	(United States) Aline Terry (United States) Harriet Butler	(United States) Augusta Schultz (United States) Miss Stone	6–4, 6–3
1894	(United States) Helen Hellwig (United States) Juliette Atkinson	(United States) Annabella C. Wistar (United States) Amy Williams	6–4, 8–6, 6–2
1895	(United States) Helen Hellwig (United States) Juliette Atkinson	(United States) Elisabeth Moore (United States) Amy Williams	6–2, 6–2, 12–10
1896	(United States) Elisabeth Moore (United States) Juliette Atkinson	(United States) Annabella C. Wistar (United States) Amy Williams	6–4, 7–5
1897	(United States) Juliette Atkinson (United States) Kathleen Atkinson	(United States) Mrs. F. Edwards (United States) Elizabeth Rastall	6–2, 6–1, 6–1
1898	(United States) Juliette Atkinson (United States) Kathleen Atkinson	(United States) Marie Wimer (United States) Carrie Neely	6–1, 2–6, 4–6, 6–1, 6–2
1899	(United States) Jane Craven (United States) Myrtle McAteer	(United States) Maud Banks (United States) Elizabeth Rastall	6–1, 6–1, 7–5
1900	(United States) Edith Parker (United States) Hallie Champlin	(United States) Marie Wimer (United States) Myrtle McAteer	9–7, 6–2, 6–2
1901	(United States) Juliette Atkinson (United States) Myrtle McAteer	(United States) Marion Jones (United States) Elisabeth Moore	default
1902	(United States) Juliette Atkinson (United States) Marion Jones	(United States) Maud Banks (United States) Nona Closterman	6–2, 7–5
1903	(United States) Elisabeth Moore (United States) Carrie Neely	(United States) Miriam Hall (United States) Marion Jones	6–4, 6–1, 6–1
1904	(United States) May Sutton (United States) Miriam Hall	(United States) Elisabeth Moore (United States) Carrie Neely	3–6, 6–3, 6–3
1905	(United States) Helen Homans (United States) Carrie Neely	(United States) Marjorie Oberteuffer (United States) Virginia Maule	6–0, 6–1
1906	(United States) Ann Burdette Coe (United States) Ethel Bliss Platt	(United States) Helen Homans (United States) Clover Boldt	6–4, 6–4
1907	(United States) Marie Wimer (United States) Carrie Neely	(United States) Edna Wildey (United States) Natalie Wildey	6–1, 2–6, 6–4
1908	(United States) Evelyn Sears (United States) Margaret Curtis	(United States) Carrie Neely (United States) Miriam Steever	6–3, 5–7, 9–7
1909	(United States) Hazel Hotchkiss Wightman (United States) Edith Rotch	(United States) Dorothy Green (Canada) Lois Moyes	6–1, 6–1
1910	(United States) Hazel Hotchkiss Wightman (United States) Edith Rotch	(United States) Adelaide Browning (United States) Edna Wildey	6–4, 6–4
1911	(United States) Hazel Hotchkiss Wightman (United States) Eleonora Sears	(United States) Dorothy Green (United States) Florence Sutton	6–4, 4–6, 6–2
1912	(United States) Dorothy Green (United States) Mary K. Browne	(United States) Maud Barger-Wallach (United Kingdom of Great Britain and Ireland) Mrs. Frederick Schmitz	6–2, 5–7, 6–0
1913	(United States) Mary K. Browne (United States) Louise Riddell Williams	(United States) Dorothy Green (United States) Edna Wildey	12–10, 2–6, 6–3
1914	(United States) Mary K. Browne (United States) Louise Riddell Williams	(United States) Louise Raymond (United States) Edna Wildey	10–8, 6–2
1915	(United States) Hazel Hotchkiss Wightman (United States) Eleonora Sears	(United States) Helen Homans McLean (United States) Mrs. G. L. Chapman	10–8, 6–2
1916	(Norway) Molla Bjurstedt (United States) Eleonora Sears	(United States) Louise Raymond (United States) Edna Wildey	4–6, 6–2, 10–8
1917	(Norway) Molla Bjurstedt (United States) Eleonora Sears	(United States) Phyllis Walsh (United States) Grace Moore LeRoy	6–2, 6–4
1918	(United States) Marion Zinderstein (United States) Eleanor Goss	(Norway) Molla Bjurstedt (Norway) Anna Rogge	7–5, 8–6
1919	(United States) Marion Zinderstein (United States) Eleanor Goss	(United States) Eleonora Sears (United States) Hazel Hotchkiss Wightman	10–8, 9–7
1920	(United States) Marion Zinderstein (United States) Eleanor Goss	(United States) Eleanor Tennant (United States) Helen Baker	6–3, 6–1
1921	(United States) Mary K. Browne (United States) Louise Riddell Williams	(United States) Helen Gilleaudeau (United States) Aletta Bailey Morris	6–3, 6–2
1922	(United States) Marion Zinderstein Jessup (United States) Helen Wills Moody	(United States) Edith Sigourney (United States) Molla Bjurstedt Mallory	6–4, 7–9, 6–3
1923	(United Kingdom) Kitty McKane Godfree (United Kingdom) Phyllis Howkins Covell	(United States) Hazel Hotchkiss Wightman (United States) Eleanor Goss	2–6, 6–2, 6–1
1924	(United States) Hazel Hotchkiss Wightman (United States) Helen Wills Moody	(United States) Eleanor Goss (United States) Marion Jessup	6–4, 6–3
1925	(United States) Mary K. Browne (United States) Helen Wills Moody	(United States) May Bundy (United States) Elizabeth Ryan	6–4, 6–3
1926	(United States) Elizabeth Ryan (United States) Eleanor Goss	(United Kingdom) Mary K. Browne (United States) Charlotte Hosmer Chapin	3–6, 6–4, 12–10
1927	(United Kingdom) Kitty McKane Godfree (United Kingdom) Ermyntrude Harvey	(United Kingdom) Betty Nuthall (United Kingdom) Joan Fry	6–1, 4–6, 6–4
1928	(United States) Hazel Hotchkiss Wightman (United States) Helen Wills Moody	(United States) Edith Cross (United States) Anna McCune Harper	6–2, 6–2
1929	(United Kingdom) Phoebe Holcroft Watson (United Kingdom) Peggy Michell	(United Kingdom) Phyllis Covell (United Kingdom) Dorothy Shepherd-Barron	2–6, 6–3, 6–4
1930	(United Kingdom) Betty Nuthall (United States) Sarah Palfrey Cooke	(United States) Edith Cross (United States) Anna McCune Harper	3–6, 6–3, 7–5
1931	(United Kingdom) Betty Nuthall (United Kingdom) Eileen Bennett Whittingstall	(United States) Helen Jacobs (United Kingdom) Dorothy Round	6–2, 6–4
1932	(United States) Helen Jacobs (United States) Sarah Palfrey Cooke	(United States) Alice Marble (United States) Marjorie Morrill	8–6, 6–1
1933	(United Kingdom) Betty Nuthall (United Kingdom) Freda James	(United States) Helen Wills Moody (United States) Elizabeth Ryan	default
1934	(United States) Helen Jacobs (United States) Sarah Palfrey Cooke	(United States) Carolin Babcock (United States) Dorothy Andrus	4–6, 6–3, 6–4
1935	(United States) Helen Jacobs (United States) Sarah Palfrey Cooke	(United States) Carolin Babcock (United States) Dorothy Andrus	6–4, 6–2
1936	(United States) Marjorie Gladman Van Ryn (United States) Carolin Babcock Stark	(United States) Helen Jacobs (United States) Sarah Palfrey Cooke	9–7, 2–6, 6–4
1937	(United States) Sarah Palfrey Cooke (United States) Alice Marble	(United States) Marjorie Gladman Van Ryn (United States) Carolin Babcock	7–5, 6–4
1938	(United States) Sarah Palfrey Cooke (United States) Alice Marble	(France) Simonne Mathieu (Poland) Jadwiga Jędrzejowska	6–8, 6–4, 6–3
1939	(United States) Sarah Palfrey Cooke (United States) Alice Marble	(United Kingdom) Kay Stammers (United Kingdom) Freda Hammersley	7–5, 8–6
1940	(United States) Sarah Palfrey Cooke (United States) Alice Marble	(United States) Dorothy Bundy (United States) Marjorie Gladman Van Ryn	6–4, 6–3
1941	(United States) Sarah Palfrey Cooke (United States) Margaret Osborne duPont	(United States) Dorothy Bundy (United States) Pauline Betz	3–6, 6–1, 6–4
1942	(United States) Louise Brough (United States) Margaret Osborne duPont	(United States) Pauline Betz (United States) Doris Hart	2–6, 7–5, 6–0
1943	(United States) Louise Brough (United States) Margaret Osborne duPont	(United States) Pauline Betz (United States) Doris Hart	6–4, 6–3
1944	(United States) Louise Brough (United States) Margaret Osborne duPont	(United States) Pauline Betz (United States) Doris Hart	4–6, 6–4, 6–3
1945	(United States) Louise Brough (United States) Margaret Osborne duPont	(United States) Pauline Betz (United States) Doris Hart	6–3, 6–3
1946	(United States) Louise Brough (United States) Margaret Osborne duPont	(United States) Mary Prentiss (United States) Patricia Todd	6–1, 6–3
1947	(United States) Louise Brough (United States) Margaret Osborne duPont	(United States) Doris Hart (United States) Patricia Todd	5–7, 6–3, 7–5
1948	(United States) Louise Brough (United States) Margaret Osborne duPont	(United States) Doris Hart (United States) Patricia Todd	6–4, 8–10, 6–1
1949	(United States) Louise Brough (United States) Margaret Osborne duPont	(United States) Doris Hart (United States) Shirley Fry	6–4, 10–8
1950	(United States) Louise Brough (United States) Margaret Osborne duPont	(United States) Doris Hart (United States) Shirley Fry	6–2, 6–3
1951	(United States) Doris Hart (United States) Shirley Fry	(United States) Nancy Chaffee (United States) Patricia Todd	6–4, 6–2
1952	(United States) Doris Hart (United States) Shirley Fry	(United States) Louise Brough (United States) Maureen Connolly	10–8, 6–4
1953	(United States) Doris Hart (United States) Shirley Fry	(United States) Louise Brough (United States) Margaret Osborne duPont	6–2, 7–9, 9–7
1954	(United States) Doris Hart (United States) Shirley Fry	(United States) Louise Brough (United States) Margaret Osborne duPont	6–4, 6–4
1955	(United States) Louise Brough (United States) Margaret Osborne duPont	(United States) Doris Hart (United States) Shirley Fry	6–3, 1–6, 6–3
1956	(United States) Louise Brough (United States) Margaret Osborne duPont	(United States) Betty Pratt (United States) Shirley Fry	6–3, 6–0
1957	(United States) Louise Brough (United States) Margaret Osborne duPont	(United States) Althea Gibson (United States) Darlene Hard	6–2, 7–5
1958	(United States) Jeanne Arth (United States) Darlene Hard	(United States) Althea Gibson (Brazil) Maria Bueno	2–6, 6–3, 6–4
1959	(United States) Jeanne Arth (United States) Darlene Hard	(Brazil) Maria Bueno (United States) Sally Moore	6–2, 6–3
1960	(Brazil) Maria Bueno (United States) Darlene Hard	(United Kingdom) Ann Haydon (United Kingdom) Deidre Catt	6–1, 6–1
1961	(United States) Darlene Hard (Australia) Lesley Turner Bowrey	(West Germany) Edda Buding (Mexico) Yola Ramírez	6–4, 5–7, 6–0
1962	(Brazil) Maria Bueno (United States) Darlene Hard	(United States) Billie Jean Moffitt (United States) Karen Susman	4–6, 6–3, 6–2
1963	(Australia) Robyn Ebbern (Australia) Margaret Smith	(United States) Darlene Hard (Brazil) Maria Bueno	4–6, 10–8, 6–3
1964	(United States) Billie Jean King (United States) Karen Hantze Susman	(Australia) Margaret Smith (Australia) Lesley Turner Bowrey	3–6, 6–2, 6–4
1965	(United States) Carole Caldwell Graebner (United States) Nancy Richey	(United States) Billie Jean Moffitt (United States) Karen Susman	6–4, 6–4
1966	(Brazil) Maria Bueno (United States) Nancy Richey	(United States) Billie Jean Moffitt (United States) Rosemary Casals	6–3, 6–4
1967	(United States) Rosemary Casals (United States) Billie Jean King	(United States) Mary-Ann Eisel (United States) Donna Floyd Fales	4–6, 6–3, 6–4

=== US Open ===
Year	Champions	Runners-up	Score
1968	(Brazil) Maria Bueno (Australia) Margaret Court	(United States) Rosemary Casals (United States) Billie Jean King	4–6, 9–7, 8–6
1969	(France) Françoise Dürr (United States) Darlene Hard	(Australia) Margaret Court (United Kingdom) Virginia Wade	0–6, 6–3, 6–4
1970	(Australia) Margaret Court (Australia) Judy Tegart-Dalton	(United States) Rosemary Casals (United Kingdom) Virginia Wade	6–3, 6–4
1971	(United States) Rosemary Casals (Australia) Judy Tegart-Dalton	(France) Gail Sherriff Chanfreau (France) Françoise Dürr	6–3, 6–3
1972	(France) Françoise Dürr (Netherlands) Betty Stöve	(Australia) Margaret Court (United Kingdom) Virginia Wade	6–3, 1–6, 6–3
1973	(Australia) Margaret Court (United Kingdom) Virginia Wade	(United States) Rosemary Casals (United States) Billie Jean King	3–6, 6–3, 7–5
1974	(United States) Rosemary Casals (United States) Billie Jean King	(France) Françoise Dürr (Netherlands) Betty Stöve	7–6, 6–7, 6–4
1975	(Australia) Margaret Court (United Kingdom) Virginia Wade	(United States) Rosemary Casals (United States) Billie Jean King	7–5, 2–6, 7–6
1976	(South Africa) Delina Boshoff (South Africa) Ilana Kloss	(Soviet Union) Olga Morozova (United Kingdom) Virginia Wade	6–1, 6–4
1977	(United States) Martina Navratilova (Netherlands) Betty Stöve	(United States) Renée Richards (United States) Betty Ann Grubb Stuart	6–1, 7–6
1978	(United States) Billie Jean King (United States) Martina Navratilova	(Australia) Kerry Melville Reid (Australia) Wendy Turnbull	7–6, 6–4
1979	(Netherlands) Betty Stöve (Australia) Wendy Turnbull	(United States) Billie Jean King (United States) Martina Navratilova	6–4, 6–3
1980	(United States) Billie Jean King (United States) Martina Navratilova	(United States) Pam Shriver (Netherlands) Betty Stöve	7–6, 7–5
1981	(United States) Kathy Jordan (United States) Anne Smith	(United States) Rosemary Casals (Australia) Wendy Turnbull	6–3, 6–3
1982	(United States) Rosemary Casals (Australia) Wendy Turnbull	(United States) Barbara Potter (United States) Sharon Walsh	6–4, 6–4
1983	(United States) Martina Navratilova (United States) Pam Shriver	(South Africa) Rosalyn Fairbank (United States) Candy Reynolds	6–7, 6–1, 6–3
1984	(United States) Martina Navratilova (United States) Pam Shriver	(United Kingdom) Anne Hobbs (Australia) Wendy Turnbull	6–2, 6–4
1985	(West Germany) Claudia Kohde-Kilsch (Czechoslovakia) Helena Suková	(United States) Martina Navratilova (United States) Pam Shriver	6–7, 6–2, 6–3
1986	(United States) Martina Navratilova (United States) Pam Shriver	(Czechoslovakia) Hana Mandlíková (Australia) Wendy Turnbull	6–4, 3–6, 6–3
1987	(United States) Martina Navratilova (United States) Pam Shriver	(United States) Kathy Jordan (Australia) Elizabeth Sayers Smylie	5–7, 6–4, 6–2
1988	(United States) Gigi Fernández (United States) Robin White	(United States) Patty Fendick (Canada) Jill Hetherington	6–4, 6–1
1989	(Australia) Hana Mandlíková (United States) Martina Navratilova	(United States) Mary Joe Fernández (United States) Pam Shriver	5–7, 6–4, 6–4
1990	(United States) Gigi Fernández (United States) Martina Navratilova	(Czechoslovakia) Jana Novotná (Czechoslovakia) Helena Suková	6–2, 6–4
1991	(United States) Pam Shriver (Soviet Union) Natalia Zvereva	(Czechoslovakia) Jana Novotná (Soviet Union) Larisa Savchenko Neiland	6–4, 4–6, 7–6
1992	(United States) Gigi Fernández (Commonwealth of Independent States) Natalia Zvereva	(Czechoslovakia) Jana Novotná (Latvia) Larisa Savchenko Neiland	7–6, 6–1
1993	(Spain) Arantxa Sánchez Vicario (Czech Republic) Helena Suková	(South Africa) Amanda Coetzer (Argentina) Inés Gorrochategui	6–4, 6–2
1994	(Czech Republic) Jana Novotná (Spain) Arantxa Sánchez Vicario	(Bulgaria) Katerina Maleeva (United States) Robin White	6–3, 6–3
1995	(United States) Gigi Fernández (Belarus) Natalia Zvereva	(Netherlands) Brenda Schultz-McCarthy (Australia) Rennae Stubbs	7–5, 6–3
1996	(United States) Gigi Fernández (Belarus) Natalia Zvereva	(Czech Republic) Jana Novotná (Spain) Arantxa Sánchez Vicario	1–6, 6–1, 6–4
1997	(United States) Lindsay Davenport (Czech Republic) Jana Novotná	(United States) Gigi Fernández (Belarus) Natalia Zvereva	6–3, 6–4
1998	(Switzerland) Martina Hingis (Czech Republic) Jana Novotná	(United States) Lindsay Davenport (Belarus) Natalia Zvereva	6–3, 6–3
1999	(United States) Serena Williams (United States) Venus Williams	(United States) Chanda Rubin (France) Sandrine Testud	4–6, 6–1, 6–4
2000	(France) Julie Halard-Decugis (Japan) Ai Sugiyama	(Zimbabwe) Cara Black (Russia) Elena Likhovtseva	6–0, 1–6, 6–1
2001	(United States) Lisa Raymond (Australia) Rennae Stubbs	(United States) Kimberly Po-Messerli (France) Nathalie Tauziat	6–2, 5–7, 7–5
2002	(Spain) Virginia Ruano Pascual (Argentina) Paola Suárez	(Russia) Elena Dementieva (Slovakia) Janette Husárová	6–2, 6–1
2003	(Spain) Virginia Ruano Pascual (Argentina) Paola Suárez	(Russia) Svetlana Kuznetsova (United States) Martina Navratilova	6–2, 6–2
2004	(Spain) Virginia Ruano Pascual (Argentina) Paola Suárez	(Russia) Svetlana Kuznetsova (Russia) Elena Likhovtseva	6–4, 7–5
2005	(United States) Lisa Raymond (Australia) Samantha Stosur	(Russia) Elena Dementieva (Italy) Flavia Pennetta	6–2, 5–7, 6–3
2006	(France) Nathalie Dechy (Russia) Vera Zvonareva	(Russia) Dinara Safina (Slovenia) Katarina Srebotnik	7–6, 7–5
2007	(France) Nathalie Dechy (Russia) Dinara Safina	(Chinese Taipei) Chan Yung-jan (Chinese Taipei) Chuang Chia-jung	6–4, 6–2
2008	(Zimbabwe) Cara Black (United States) Liezel Huber	(United States) Lisa Raymond (Australia) Samantha Stosur	6–3, 7–6^{(8–6)}
2009	(United States) Serena Williams (United States) Venus Williams	(Zimbabwe) Cara Black (United States) Liezel Huber	6–2, 6–2
2010	(United States) Vania King (Kazakhstan) Yaroslava Shvedova	(United States) Liezel Huber (Russia) Nadia Petrova	2–6, 6–4, 7–6^{(7–4)}
2011	(United States) Liezel Huber (United States) Lisa Raymond	(United States) Vania King (Kazakhstan) Yaroslava Shvedova	4–6, 7–6^{(7–5)}, 7–6^{(7–3)}
2012	(Italy) Sara Errani (Italy) Roberta Vinci	(Czech Republic) Andrea Hlaváčková (Czech Republic) Lucie Hradecká	6–4, 6–2
2013	(Czech Republic) Andrea Hlaváčková (Czech Republic) Lucie Hradecká	(Australia) Ashleigh Barty (Australia) Casey Dellacqua	6–7^{(4–7)}, 6–1, 6–4
2014	(Russia) Ekaterina Makarova (Russia) Elena Vesnina	(Switzerland) Martina Hingis (Italy) Flavia Pennetta	2–6, 6–3, 6–2
2015	(Switzerland) Martina Hingis (India) Sania Mirza	(Australia) Casey Dellacqua (Kazakhstan) Yaroslava Shvedova	6–3, 6–3
2016	(United States) Bethanie Mattek-Sands (Czech Republic) Lucie Šafářová	(France) Caroline Garcia (France) Kristina Mladenovic	2–6, 7–6^{(7–5)}, 6–4
2017	(Chinese Taipei) Chan Yung-jan (Switzerland) Martina Hingis	(Czech Republic) Lucie Hradecká (Czech Republic) Kateřina Siniaková	6–3, 6–2
2018	(Australia) Ashleigh Barty (United States) CoCo Vandeweghe	(Hungary) Tímea Babos (France) Kristina Mladenovic	3–6, 7–6^{(7–2)}, 7–6^{(8–6)}
2019	(Belgium) Elise Mertens (Belarus) Aryna Sabalenka	(Australia) Ashleigh Barty (Belarus) Victoria Azarenka	7–5, 7–5
2020	(Germany) Laura Siegemund (Russia) Vera Zvonareva	(United States) Nicole Melichar (China) Xu Yifan	6–4, 6–4
2021	(Australia) Samantha Stosur (China) Zhang Shuai	(United States) Coco Gauff (United States) Caty McNally	6–3, 3–6, 6–3
2022	(Czech Republic) Barbora Krejčíková (Czech Republic) Kateřina Siniaková	(United States) Caty McNally (United States) Taylor Townsend	3–6, 7–5, 6–1
2023	(Canada) Gabriela Dabrowski (New Zealand) Erin Routliffe	(Germany) Laura Siegemund; Vera Zvonareva	7–6^{(11–9)}, 6–3
2024	(Ukraine) Lyudmyla Kichenok (Latvia) Jeļena Ostapenko	(France) Kristina Mladenovic (China) Zhang Shuai	6–4, 6–3
2025	(Canada) Gabriela Dabrowski (New Zealand) Erin Routliffe	(Czech Republic) Kateřina Siniaková (United States) Taylor Townsend	6–4, 6–4
2026	(Czech Republic) Kateřina Siniaková (United States) Taylor Townsend	(United States) Ashlyn Krueger (United States) Robin Montgomery	5–7, 6–0, 6–2

== See also ==
US Open other competitions

- List of US Open men's singles champions
- List of US Open men's doubles champions
- List of US Open women's singles champions
- List of US Open mixed doubles champions

Grand Slam women's doubles

- List of Australian Open women's doubles champions
- List of French Open women's doubles champions
- List of Wimbledon ladies' doubles champions
- List of Grand Slam women's doubles champions
