= 1900 in tennis =

This page covers all the important events in the sport of tennis in 1900. It provides the results of notable tournaments throughout the year on both the men's and women's ILTF tennis circuits.

== Australian Open ==
No event.

== French Open ==
Not a Grand Slam event.

== Wimbledon ==
Category	Champion(s)	Finalist(s)	Score
Men's singles	(United Kingdom of Great Britain and Ireland) Reginald Doherty	(United Kingdom of Great Britain and Ireland) Sydney Smith	6–8, 6–3, 6–1, 5–7, 11–9
Women's singles	(United Kingdom of Great Britain and Ireland) Blanche Hillyard	(United Kingdom of Great Britain and Ireland) Charlotte Cooper	4–6, 6–4, 6–4
Men's doubles	(United Kingdom of Great Britain and Ireland) Laurence Doherty (United Kingdom of Great Britain and Ireland) Reginald Doherty	(United Kingdom of Great Britain and Ireland) Herbert Roper Barrett (United Kingdom of Great Britain and Ireland) Harold Nisbet	9–7, 7–5, 4–6, 3–6, 6–3

== US Open ==
Category	Champion(s)	Finalist(s)	Score
Men's singles	(United States) Malcolm Whitman	(United States) William Larned	6–4, 1–6, 6–2, 6–2
Women's singles	(United States) Myrtle McAteer	(United States) Edith Parker	6–2, 6–2, 6–0
Men's doubles	(United States) Holcombe Ward (United States) Dwight Davis	(United States) Fred Alexander (United States) Raymond Little	6–4, 9–7, 12–10
Women's doubles	(United States) Hallie Champlin (United States) Edith Parker	(United States) Marie Wimer (United States) Myrtle McAteer	9–7, 6–2, 6–2
Mixed doubles	(United States) Margaret Hunnewell (United States) Alfred Codman	(United States) T. Shaw (United States) George Atkinson	11–9, 6–3, 6–1
