= List of US Open champions =

The following is a list of US Open champions in tennis:

== Champions ==
=== Senior ===
Year	Singles		Doubles		
Year	Men	Women	Men	Women	Mixed
1881	(United States) Richard Sears (x7)	No competition	(United States) Clarence Clark (United States) Frederick Winslow Taylor	No competition	No competition
1882	(United States) Richard Sears (x7)	No competition	(United States) Richard Sears (United States) James Dwight (x3)	No competition	No competition
1883	(United States) Richard Sears (x7)	No competition	(United States) Richard Sears (United States) James Dwight (x3)	No competition	No competition
1884	(United States) Richard Sears (x7)	No competition	(United States) Richard Sears (United States) James Dwight (x3)	No competition	No competition
1885	(United States) Richard Sears (x7)	No competition	(United States) Richard Sears (United States) Joseph Clark	No competition	No competition
1886	(United States) Richard Sears (x7)	No competition	(United States) Richard Sears (United States) James Dwight (x2)	No competition	No competition
1887	(United States) Richard Sears (x7)	(United States) Ellen Hansell	(United States) Richard Sears (United States) James Dwight (x2)	No competition	No competition
1888	(United States) Henry Slocum (x2)	(United States) Bertha Townsend (x2)	(United States) Oliver Campbell (United States) Valentine Hall	No competition	No competition
1889	(United States) Henry Slocum (x2)	(United States) Bertha Townsend (x2)	(United States) Henry Slocum (United States) Howard Taylor	(United States) Bertha Townsend (United States) Margarette Ballard	No competition
1890	(United States) Oliver Campbell (x3)	(United States) Ellen Roosevelt	(United States) Valentine Hall (United States) Clarence Hobart	(United States) Ellen Roosevelt (United States) Grace Roosevelt	No competition
1891	(United States) Oliver Campbell (x3)	(United Kingdom) Mabel Cahill (x2)	(United States) Oliver Campbell (United States) Bob Huntington (x2)	(United Kingdom) Mabel Cahill (United States) Emma Leavitt-Morgan	No competition
1892	(United States) Oliver Campbell (x3)	(United Kingdom) Mabel Cahill (x2)	(United States) Oliver Campbell (United States) Bob Huntington (x2)	(United Kingdom) Mabel Cahill (United States) Adeline McKinlay	(United Kingdom) Mabel Cahill (United States) Clarence Hobart
1893	(United States) Robert Wrenn (x2)	(United States) Aline Terry	(United States) Clarence Hobart (United States) Fred Hovey (x2)	(United States) Aline Terry (United States) Harriet Butler	(United States) Ellen Roosevelt (United States) Clarence Hobart
1894	(United States) Robert Wrenn (x2)	(United States) Helen Hellwig	(United States) Clarence Hobart (United States) Fred Hovey (x2)	(United States) Helen Hellwig (United States) Juliette Atkinson (x2)	(United States) Juliette Atkinson (United States) Edwin Fischer (x3)
1895	(United States) Fred Hovey	(United States) Juliette Atkinson	(United States) Malcolm Chace (United States) Robert Wrenn	(United States) Helen Hellwig (United States) Juliette Atkinson (x2)	(United States) Juliette Atkinson (United States) Edwin Fischer (x3)
1896	(United States) Robert Wrenn (x2)	(United States) Elisabeth Moore	(United States) Carr Neel (United States) Sam Neel	(United States) Elisabeth Moore (United States) Juliette Atkinson	(United States) Juliette Atkinson (United States) Edwin Fischer (x3)
1897	(United States) Robert Wrenn (x2)	(United States) Juliette Atkinson (x2)	(Canada) Leo Ware (United States) George Sheldon (x2)	(United States) Juliette Atkinson (United States) Kathleen Atkinson (x2)	(United States) Laura Henson (United States) D. L. Magruder
1898	(United States) Malcolm Whitman (x3)	(United States) Juliette Atkinson (x2)	(Canada) Leo Ware (United States) George Sheldon (x2)	(United States) Juliette Atkinson (United States) Kathleen Atkinson (x2)	(United States) Carrie Neely (United States) Edwin Fischer
1899	(United States) Malcolm Whitman (x3)	(United States) Marion Jones	(United States) Holcombe Ward (United States) Dwight F. Davis (x3)	(United States) Jane Craven (United States) Myrtle McAteer	(United States) Elizabeth Rastall (United States) Albert L. Hoskins
1900	(United States) Malcolm Whitman (x3)	(United States) Myrtle McAteer	(United States) Holcombe Ward (United States) Dwight F. Davis (x3)	(United States) Edith Parker (United States) Hallie Champlin	(United States) Margaret Hunnewell (United States) Alfred Codman
1901	(United States) William Larned (x2)	(United States) Elisabeth Moore	(United States) Holcombe Ward (United States) Dwight F. Davis (x3)	(United States) Juliette Atkinson (United States) Myrtle McAteer	(United States) Marion Jones (United States) Raymond Little
1902	(United States) William Larned (x2)	(United States) Marion Jones	(United Kingdom of Great Britain and Ireland) Reginald Doherty (United Kingdom of Great Britain and Ireland) Laurence Doherty (x2)	(United States) Juliette Atkinson (United States) Marion Jones	(United States) Elisabeth Moore (United States) Wylie Grant
1903	(United Kingdom) Laurence Doherty	(United States) Elisabeth Moore	(United Kingdom of Great Britain and Ireland) Reginald Doherty (United Kingdom of Great Britain and Ireland) Laurence Doherty (x2)	(United States) Elisabeth Moore (United States) Carrie Neely	(United States) Helen Chapman (United States) Harry F. Allen
1904	(United States) Holcombe Ward	(United States) May Sutton Bundy	(United States) Holcombe Ward (United States) Beals Wright (x3)	(United States) May Sutton (United States) Miriam Hall	(United States) Elisabeth Moore (United States) Wylie Grant
1905	(United States) Beals Wright	(United States) Elisabeth Moore	(United States) Holcombe Ward (United States) Beals Wright (x3)	(United States) Helen Homans (United States) Carrie Neely	(United States) Augusta Schultz Hobart (United States) Clarence Hobart
1906	(United States) William Clothier	(United States) Helen Homans	(United States) Holcombe Ward (United States) Beals Wright (x3)	(United States) Ann Burdette Coe (United States) Ethel Bliss Platt	(United States) Sarah Coffin (Australia) Edward Dewhurst
1907	(United States) William Larned (x5)	(United States) Evelyn Sears	(United States) Fred Alexander (United States) Harold Hackett (x4)	(United States) Marie Wimer (United States) Carrie Neely	(United States) May Sayers (United States) Wallace F. Johnson
1908	(United States) William Larned (x5)	(United States) Maud Barger-Wallach	(United States) Fred Alexander (United States) Harold Hackett (x4)	(United States) Evelyn Sears (United States) Margaret Curtis	(United States) Nathaniel Niles (United States) Edith Rotch
1909	(United States) William Larned (x5)	(United States) Hazel Hotchkiss Wightman (x3)	(United States) Fred Alexander (United States) Harold Hackett (x4)	(United States) Hazel Hotchkiss Wightman (United States) Edith Rotch (x2)	(United States) Hazel Hotchkiss Wightman (United States) Wallace F. Johnson
1910	(United States) William Larned (x5)	(United States) Hazel Hotchkiss Wightman (x3)	(United States) Fred Alexander (United States) Harold Hackett (x4)	(United States) Hazel Hotchkiss Wightman (United States) Edith Rotch (x2)	(United States) Hazel Hotchkiss Wightman (United States) Joseph R. Carpenter, Jr.
1911	(United States) William Larned (x5)	(United States) Hazel Hotchkiss Wightman (x3)	(United States) Raymond Little (United States) Gus Touchard	(United States) Hazel Hotchkiss Wightman (United States) Eleonora Sears	(United States) Hazel Hotchkiss Wightman (United States) Wallace F. Johnson
1912	(United States) Maurice McLoughlin (x2)	(United States) Mary Browne (x3)	(United States) Maurice McLoughlin (United States) Tom Bundy (x3)	(United States) Dorothy Green (United States) Mary K. Browne	(United States) Mary K. Browne (United States) R. Norris Williams
1913	(United States) Maurice McLoughlin (x2)	(United States) Mary Browne (x3)	(United States) Maurice McLoughlin (United States) Tom Bundy (x3)	(United States) Mary K. Browne (United States) Louise Riddell Williams (x2)	(United States) Mary K. Browne (United States) Bill Tilden (x2)
1914	(United States) Richard Williams	(United States) Mary Browne (x3)	(United States) Maurice McLoughlin (United States) Tom Bundy (x3)	(United States) Mary K. Browne (United States) Louise Riddell Williams (x2)	(United States) Mary K. Browne (United States) Bill Tilden (x2)
1915	(United States) William Johnston	(Norway) Molla Bjurstedt Mallory (x4)	(United States) Clarence Griffin (United States) Bill Johnston (x2)	(United States) Hazel Hotchkiss Wightman (United States) Eleonora Sears	(United States) Hazel Hotchkiss Wightman (United States) Harry C. Johnson
1916	(United States) Richard Williams	(Norway) Molla Bjurstedt Mallory (x4)	(United States) Clarence Griffin (United States) Bill Johnston (x2)	(Norway) Molla Bjurstedt (United States) Eleonora Sears (x2)	(United States) Eleonora Sears (United States) Willis E. Davis
1917	(United States) Robert Lindley Murray (x2)	(Norway) Molla Bjurstedt Mallory (x4)	(United States) Fred Alexander (United States) Harold Throckmorton	(Norway) Molla Bjurstedt (United States) Eleonora Sears (x2)	(Norway) Molla Bjurstedt Mallory (United States) Irving Wright
1918	(United States) Robert Lindley Murray (x2)	(Norway) Molla Bjurstedt Mallory (x4)	(United States) Vincent Richards (United States) Bill Tilden	(United States) Marion Zinderstein (United States) Eleanor Goss (x3)	(United States) Hazel Hotchkiss Wightman (United States) Irving Wright
1919	(United States) William Johnston	(United States) Hazel Hotchkiss Wightman	(Australia) Norman Brookes (Australia) Gerald Patterson	(United States) Marion Zinderstein (United States) Eleanor Goss (x3)	(United States) Marion Zinderstein (United States) Vincent Richards
1920	(United States) Bill Tilden (x6)	(United States) Molla Bjurstedt Mallory (x3)	(United States) Clarence Griffin (United States) Bill Johnston	(United States) Marion Zinderstein (United States) Eleanor Goss (x3)	(United States) Hazel Hotchkiss Wightman (United States) Wallace F. Johnson
1921	(United States) Bill Tilden (x6)	(United States) Molla Bjurstedt Mallory (x3)	(United States) Vincent Richards (United States) Bill Tilden (x2)	(United States) Mary K. Browne (United States) Louise Riddell Williams	(United States) Mary K. Browne (United States) Bill Johnston
1922	(United States) Bill Tilden (x6)	(United States) Molla Bjurstedt Mallory (x3)	(United States) Vincent Richards (United States) Bill Tilden (x2)	(United States) Marion Zinderstein Jessup (United States) Helen Wills Moody	(United States) Molla Bjurstedt Mallory (United States) Bill Tilden (x2)
1923	(United States) Bill Tilden (x6)	(United States) Helen Wills Moody (x3)	(South Africa) Brian Norton (United States) Bill Tilden	(United Kingdom) Kitty McKane Godfree (United Kingdom) Phyllis Howkins Covell	(United States) Molla Bjurstedt Mallory (United States) Bill Tilden (x2)
1924	(United States) Bill Tilden (x6)	(United States) Helen Wills Moody (x3)	(United States) Howard Kinsey (United States) Robert Kinsey	(United States) Hazel Hotchkiss Wightman (United States) Helen Wills Moody	(United States) Helen Wills (United States) Vincent Richards
1925	(United States) Bill Tilden (x6)	(United States) Helen Wills Moody (x3)	(United States) Vincent Richards (United States) R. Norris Williams (x2)	(United States) Mary K. Browne (United States) Helen Wills Moody	(United Kingdom) Kitty McKane Godfree (Australia) John B. Hawkes
1926	(France) René Lacoste (x2)	(United States) Molla Bjurstedt Mallory	(United States) Vincent Richards (United States) R. Norris Williams (x2)	(United States) Elizabeth Ryan (United States) Eleanor Goss	(United States) Elizabeth Ryan (France) Jean Borotra
1927	(France) René Lacoste (x2)	(United States) Helen Wills Moody (x3)	(United States) Frank Hunter (United States) Bill Tilden	(United Kingdom) Kitty McKane Godfree (United Kingdom) Ermyntrude Harvey	(United Kingdom) Eileen Bennett Whittingstall (France) Henri Cochet
1928	(France) Henri Cochet	(United States) Helen Wills Moody (x3)	(United States) George Lott (United States) John F. Hennessey	(United States) Hazel Hotchkiss Wightman (United States) Helen Wills Moody	(United States) Helen Wills (Australia) John B. Hawkes
1929	(United States) Bill Tilden	(United States) Helen Wills Moody (x3)	(United States) George Lott (United States) John Doeg (x2)	(United Kingdom) Phoebe Holcroft Watson (United Kingdom) Peggy Michell	(United Kingdom) Betty Nuthall Shoemaker (United States) George Lott
1930	(United States) John Doeg	(United Kingdom) Betty Nuthall	(United States) George Lott (United States) John Doeg (x2)	(United Kingdom) Betty Nuthall (United States) Sarah Palfrey Cooke	(United States) Edith Cross (United States) Wilmer Allison
1931	(United States) Ellsworth Vines (x2)	(United States) Helen Wills Moody	(United States) Wilmer Allison (United States) John Van Ryn	(United Kingdom) Betty Nuthall (United Kingdom) Eileen Bennett Whittingstall	(United Kingdom) Betty Nuthall Shoemaker (United States) George Lott
1932	(United States) Ellsworth Vines (x2)	(United States) Helen Jacobs (x4)	(United States) Ellsworth Vines (United States) Keith Gledhill	(United States) Helen Jacobs (United States) Sarah Palfrey Cooke	(United States) Sarah Palfrey Cooke (United Kingdom) Fred Perry
1933	(United Kingdom) Fred Perry (x2)	(United States) Helen Jacobs (x4)	(United States) George Lott (United States) Lester Stoefen (x2)	(United Kingdom) Betty Nuthall (United Kingdom) Freda James	(United States) Elizabeth Ryan (United States) Ellsworth Vines
1934	(United Kingdom) Fred Perry (x2)	(United States) Helen Jacobs (x4)	(United States) George Lott (United States) Lester Stoefen (x2)	(United States) Helen Jacobs (United States) Sarah Palfrey Cooke	(United States) Helen Jacobs (United States) George Lott
1935	(United States) Wilmer Allison	(United States) Helen Jacobs (x4)	(United States) Wilmer Allison (United States) John Van Ryn	(United States) Helen Jacobs (United States) Sarah Palfrey Cooke	(United States) Sarah Palfrey Cooke (Spain) Enrique Maier
1936	(United Kingdom) Fred Perry	(United States) Alice Marble	(United States) Don Budge (United States) Gene Mako	(United States) Marjorie Gladman Van Ryn (United States) Carolin Babcock Stark	(United States) Alice Marble (United States) Gene Mako
1937	(United States) Don Budge (x2)	(Chile) Anita Lizana	(Nazi Germany) Gottfried von Cramm (Nazi Germany) Henner Henkel	(United States) Sarah Palfrey Cooke (United States) Alice Marble (x4)	(United States) Sarah Palfrey Cooke (United States) Don Budge
1938	(United States) Don Budge (x2)	(United States) Alice Marble (x3)	(United States) Don Budge (United States) Gene Mako	(United States) Sarah Palfrey Cooke (United States) Alice Marble (x4)	(United States) Alice Marble (United States) Don Budge
1939	(United States) Bobby Riggs	(United States) Alice Marble (x3)	(Australia) John Bromwich (Australia) Adrian Quist	(United States) Sarah Palfrey Cooke (United States) Alice Marble (x4)	(United States) Alice Marble (Australia) Harry Hopman
1940	(United States) Don McNeill	(United States) Alice Marble (x3)	(United States) Jack Kramer (United States) Ted Schroeder (x2)	(United States) Sarah Palfrey Cooke (United States) Alice Marble (x4)	(United States) Alice Marble (United States) Bobby Riggs
1941	(United States) Bobby Riggs	(United States) Sarah Palfrey Cooke	(United States) Jack Kramer (United States) Ted Schroeder (x2)	(United States) Sarah Palfrey Cooke (United States) Margaret Osborne duPont	(United States) Sarah Palfrey Cooke (United States) Jack Kramer
1942	(United States) Ted Schroeder	(United States) Pauline Betz (x3)	(United States) Gardnar Mulloy (United States) Bill Talbert	(United States) Louise Brough (United States) Margaret Osborne duPont (x9)	(United States) Louise Brough (United States) Ted Schroeder
1943	(United States) Joseph Hunt	(United States) Pauline Betz (x3)	(United States) Jack Kramer (United States) Frank Parker	(United States) Louise Brough (United States) Margaret Osborne duPont (x9)	(United States) Margaret Osborne duPont (United States) Bill Talbert (x4)
1944	(United States) Frank Parker (x2)	(United States) Pauline Betz (x3)	(United States) Robert Falkenburg (United States) Don McNeill	(United States) Louise Brough (United States) Margaret Osborne duPont (x9)	(United States) Margaret Osborne duPont (United States) Bill Talbert (x4)
1945	(United States) Frank Parker (x2)	(United States) Sarah Palfrey Cooke	(United States) Gardnar Mulloy (United States) Bill Talbert (x2)	(United States) Louise Brough (United States) Margaret Osborne duPont (x9)	(United States) Margaret Osborne duPont (United States) Bill Talbert (x4)
1946	(United States) Jack Kramer (x2)	(United States) Pauline Betz	(United States) Gardnar Mulloy (United States) Bill Talbert (x2)	(United States) Louise Brough (United States) Margaret Osborne duPont (x9)	(United States) Margaret Osborne duPont (United States) Bill Talbert (x4)
1947	(United States) Jack Kramer (x2)	(United States) Louise Brough	(United States) Jack Kramer (United States) Ted Schroeder	(United States) Louise Brough (United States) Margaret Osborne duPont (x9)	(United States) Louise Brough (Australia) John Bromwich
1948	(United States) Pancho Gonzales (x2)	(United States) Margaret Osborne duPont (x3)	(United States) Gardnar Mulloy (United States) Bill Talbert	(United States) Louise Brough (United States) Margaret Osborne duPont (x9)	(United States) Louise Brough (United States) Tom Brown
1949	(United States) Pancho Gonzales (x2)	(United States) Margaret Osborne duPont (x3)	(Australia) John Bromwich (Australia) Bill Sidwell	(United States) Louise Brough (United States) Margaret Osborne duPont (x9)	(United States) Louise Brough (South Africa) Eric Sturgess
1950	(United States) Arthur Larsen	(United States) Margaret Osborne duPont (x3)	(Australia) John Bromwich (Australia) Frank Sedgman	(United States) Louise Brough (United States) Margaret Osborne duPont (x9)	(United States) Margaret Osborne duPont (Australia) Ken McGregor
1951	(Australia) Frank Sedgman (x2)	(United States) Maureen Connolly (x3)	(Australia) Ken McGregor (Australia) Frank Sedgman	(United States) Doris Hart (United States) Shirley Fry (x4)	(United States) Doris Hart (Australia) Frank Sedgman (x2)
1952	(Australia) Frank Sedgman (x2)	(United States) Maureen Connolly (x3)	(Australia) Mervyn Rose (United States) Vic Seixas	(United States) Doris Hart (United States) Shirley Fry (x4)	(United States) Doris Hart (Australia) Frank Sedgman (x2)
1953	(United States) Tony Trabert	(United States) Maureen Connolly (x3)	(Australia) Rex Hartwig (Australia) Mervyn Rose	(United States) Doris Hart (United States) Shirley Fry (x4)	(United States) Doris Hart (United States) Vic Seixas (x3)
1954	(United States) Vic Seixas	(United States) Doris Hart (x2)	(United States) Vic Seixas (United States) Tony Trabert	(United States) Doris Hart (United States) Shirley Fry (x4)	(United States) Doris Hart (United States) Vic Seixas (x3)
1955	(United States) Tony Trabert	(United States) Doris Hart (x2)	(Japan) Kosei Kamo (Japan) Atsushi Miyagi	(United States) Louise Brough (United States) Margaret Osborne duPont (x3)	(United States) Doris Hart (United States) Vic Seixas (x3)
1956	(Australia) Ken Rosewall	(United States) Shirley Fry	(Australia) Lew Hoad (Australia) Ken Rosewall	(United States) Louise Brough (United States) Margaret Osborne duPont (x3)	(United States) Margaret Osborne duPont (Australia) Ken Rosewall
1957	(Australia) Malcolm Anderson	(United States) Althea Gibson (x2)	(Australia) Ashley Cooper (Australia) Neale Fraser	(United States) Louise Brough (United States) Margaret Osborne duPont (x3)	(United States) Althea Gibson (Denmark) Kurt Nielsen
1958	(Australia) Ashley Cooper	(United States) Althea Gibson (x2)	(United States) Alex Olmedo (United States) Ham Richardson	(United States) Jeanne Arth (United States) Darlene Hard (x2)	(United States) Margaret Osborne duPont (Australia) Neale Fraser (x3)
1959	(Australia) Neale Fraser (x2)	(Brazil) Maria Bueno	(Australia) Roy Emerson (Australia) Neale Fraser (x2)	(United States) Jeanne Arth (United States) Darlene Hard (x2)	(United States) Margaret Osborne duPont (Australia) Neale Fraser (x3)
1960	(Australia) Neale Fraser (x2)	(United States) Darlene Hard (x2)	(Australia) Roy Emerson (Australia) Neale Fraser (x2)	(Brazil) Maria Bueno (United States) Darlene Hard	(United States) Margaret Osborne duPont (Australia) Neale Fraser (x3)
1961	(Australia) Roy Emerson	(United States) Darlene Hard (x2)	(United States) Chuck McKinley (United States) Dennis Ralston	(United States) Darlene Hard (Australia) Lesley Turner Bowrey	(Australia) Margaret Court (Australia) Bob Mark
1962	(Australia) Rod Laver	(Australia) Margaret Smith Court	(Mexico) Rafael Osuna (Mexico) Antonio Palafox	(Brazil) Maria Bueno (United States) Darlene Hard	(Australia) Margaret Court (Australia) Fred Stolle
1963	(Mexico) Rafael Osuna	(Brazil) Maria Bueno (x2)	(United States) Chuck McKinley (United States) Dennis Ralston (x2)	(Australia) Robyn Ebbern (Australia) Margaret Smith	(Australia) Margaret Court (Australia) Ken Fletcher
1964	(Australia) Roy Emerson	(Brazil) Maria Bueno (x2)	(United States) Chuck McKinley (United States) Dennis Ralston (x2)	(United States) Billie Jean King (United States) Karen Hantze Susman	(Australia) Margaret Court (Australia) John Newcombe
1965	(Spain) Manuel Santana	(Australia) Margaret Smith Court	(Australia) Roy Emerson (Australia) Fred Stolle (x2)	(United States) Carole Caldwell Graebner (United States) Nancy Richey	(Australia) Margaret Court (Australia) Fred Stolle
1966	(Australia) Fred Stolle	(Brazil) Maria Bueno	(Australia) Roy Emerson (Australia) Fred Stolle (x2)	(Brazil) Maria Bueno (United States) Nancy Richey	(United States) Donna Floyd Fales (Australia) Owen Davidson
1967	(Australia) John Newcombe	(United States) Billie Jean Moffitt King	(Australia) John Newcombe (Australia) Tony Roche	(United States) Rosemary Casals (United States) Billie Jean King	(United States) Billie Jean King (Australia) Owen Davidson
1968	↓ Open Era ↓				
1968	(United States) Arthur Ashe	(United Kingdom) Virginia Wade	(United States) Robert Lutz (United States) Stan Smith	(Brazil) Maria Bueno (Australia) Margaret Court	(United States) Mary-Ann Eisel (United Kingdom) Peter Curtis
1969	(Australia) Rod Laver	(Australia) Margaret Court (x2)	(Australia) Ken Rosewall (Australia) Fred Stolle	(France) Françoise Dürr (United States) Darlene Hard	(Australia) Margaret Court (United States) Marty Riessen (x2)
1970	(Australia) Ken Rosewall	(Australia) Margaret Court (x2)	(France) Pierre Barthès (Socialist Federal Republic of Yugoslavia) Nikola Pilić	(Australia) Margaret Court (Australia) Judy Tegart-Dalton	(Australia) Margaret Court (United States) Marty Riessen (x2)
1971	(United States) Stan Smith	(United States) Billie Jean King (x2)	(Australia) John Newcombe (United Kingdom) Roger Taylor	(United States) Rosemary Casals (Australia) Judy Tegart Dalton	(United States) Billie Jean King (Australia) Owen Davidson
1972	(Romania) Ilie Năstase	(United States) Billie Jean King (x2)	(South Africa) Cliff Drysdale (United Kingdom) Roger Taylor	(France) Françoise Dürr (Netherlands) Betty Stöve	(Australia) Margaret Court (United States) Marty Riessen
1973	(Australia) John Newcombe	(Australia) Margaret Court	(Australia) Owen Davidson (Australia) John Newcombe	(Australia) Margaret Court (United Kingdom) Virginia Wade	(United States) Billie Jean King (Australia) Owen Davidson
1974	(United States) Jimmy Connors	(United States) Billie Jean King	(United States) Robert Lutz (United States) Stan Smith	(United States) Rosemary Casals (United States) Billie Jean King	(United States) Pam Teeguarden (Australia) Geoff Masters
1975	(Spain) Manuel Orantes	(United States) Chris Evert (x4)	(United States) Jimmy Connors (Romania) Ilie Năstase	(Australia) Margaret Court (United Kingdom) Virginia Wade	(United States) Rosemary Casals (United States) Dick Stockton
1976	(United States) Jimmy Connors	(United States) Chris Evert (x4)	(Netherlands) Tom Okker (United States) Marty Riessen	(South Africa) Delina Boshoff (South Africa) Ilana Kloss	(United States) Billie Jean King (Australia) Phil Dent
1977	(Argentina) Guillermo Vilas	(United States) Chris Evert (x4)	(South Africa) Bob Hewitt (South Africa) Frew McMillan	(United States) Martina Navratilova (Netherlands) Betty Stöve	(Netherlands) Betty Stöve (South Africa) Frew McMillan (x2)
1978	(United States) Jimmy Connors	(United States) Chris Evert (x4)	(United States) Robert Lutz (United States) Stan Smith	(United States) Billie Jean King (United States) Martina Navratilova	(Netherlands) Betty Stöve (South Africa) Frew McMillan (x2)
1979	(United States) John McEnroe (x3)	(United States) Tracy Austin	(United States) Peter Fleming (United States) John McEnroe	(Netherlands) Betty Stöve (Australia) Wendy Turnbull	(South Africa) Greer Stevens (South Africa) Bob Hewitt
1980	(United States) John McEnroe (x3)	(United States) Chris Evert	(United States) Robert Lutz (United States) Stan Smith	(United States) Billie Jean King (United States) Martina Navratilova	(Australia) Wendy Turnbull (United States) Marty Riessen
1981	(United States) John McEnroe (x3)	(United States) Tracy Austin	(United States) Peter Fleming (United States) John McEnroe	(United States) Anne Smith (United States) Kathy Jordan	(United States) Anne Smith (South Africa) Kevin Curren (x2)
1982	(United States) Jimmy Connors (x2)	(United States) Chris Evert	(South Africa) Kevin Curren (United States) Steve Denton	(United States) Rosemary Casals (Australia) Wendy Turnbull	(United States) Anne Smith (South Africa) Kevin Curren (x2)
1983	(United States) Jimmy Connors (x2)	(United States) Martina Navratilova (x2)	(United States) Peter Fleming (United States) John McEnroe	(United States) Martina Navratilova (United States) Pam Shriver (x2)	(Australia) Elizabeth Sayers Smylie (Australia) John Fitzgerald
1984	(United States) John McEnroe	(United States) Martina Navratilova (x2)	(Australia) John Fitzgerald (Czechoslovakia) Tomáš Šmíd	(United States) Martina Navratilova (United States) Pam Shriver (x2)	(Bulgaria) Manuela Maleeva (United States) Tom Gullikson
1985	(Czechoslovakia) Ivan Lendl (x3)	(Czechoslovakia) Hana Mandlíková	(United States) Ken Flach (United States) Robert Seguso	(West Germany) Claudia Kohde-Kilsch (Czechoslovakia) Helena Suková	(United States) Martina Navratilova (Switzerland) Heinz Günthardt
1986	(Czechoslovakia) Ivan Lendl (x3)	(United States) Martina Navratilova (x2)	(Ecuador) Andrés Gómez (Socialist Federal Republic of Yugoslavia) Slobodan Živojinović	(United States) Martina Navratilova (United States) Pam Shriver (x2)	(Italy) Raffaella Reggi (Spain) Sergio Casal
1987	(Czechoslovakia) Ivan Lendl (x3)	(United States) Martina Navratilova (x2)	(Sweden) Stefan Edberg (Sweden) Anders Järryd	(United States) Martina Navratilova (United States) Pam Shriver (x2)	(United States) Martina Navratilova (Spain) Emilio Sánchez
1988	(Sweden) Mats Wilander	(West Germany) Steffi Graf (x2)	(Spain) Sergio Casal (Spain) Emilio Sánchez	(United States) Gigi Fernández (United States) Robin White	(Czechoslovakia) Jana Novotná (United States) Jim Pugh
1989	(West Germany) Boris Becker	(West Germany) Steffi Graf (x2)	(United States) John McEnroe (Australia) Mark Woodforde	(Australia) Hana Mandlíková (United States) Martina Navratilova	(United States) Robin White (United States) Shelby Cannon
1990	(United States) Pete Sampras	(Argentina) Gabriela Sabatini	(South Africa) Pieter Aldrich (South Africa) Danie Visser	(United States) Gigi Fernández (United States) Martina Navratilova	(Australia) Elizabeth Sayers Smylie (Australia) Todd Woodbridge
1991	(Sweden) Stefan Edberg (x2)	(Socialist Federal Republic of Yugoslavia) / (Federal Republic of Yugoslavia) Monica Seles (x2)	(Australia) John Fitzgerald (Sweden) Anders Järryd	(United States) Pam Shriver (Soviet Union) Natalia Zvereva	(Netherlands) Manon Bollegraf (Netherlands) Tom Nijssen
1992	(Sweden) Stefan Edberg (x2)	(Socialist Federal Republic of Yugoslavia) / (Federal Republic of Yugoslavia) Monica Seles (x2)	(United States) Jim Grabb (United States) Richey Reneberg	(United States) Gigi Fernández (Commonwealth of Independent States) Natalia Zvereva	(Australia) Nicole Provis (Australia) Mark Woodforde
1993	(United States) Pete Sampras	(Germany) Steffi Graf	(United States) Ken Flach (United States) Rick Leach	(Spain) Arantxa Sánchez Vicario (Czech Republic) Helena Suková	(Czech Republic) Helena Suková (Australia) Todd Woodbridge
1994	(United States) Andre Agassi	(Spain) Arantxa Sánchez Vicario	(Netherlands) Jacco Eltingh (Netherlands) Paul Haarhuis	(Czech Republic) Jana Novotná (Spain) Arantxa Sánchez Vicario	(South Africa) Elna Reinach (United States) Patrick Galbraith
1995	(United States) Pete Sampras (x2)	(Germany) Steffi Graf (x2)	(Australia) Todd Woodbridge (Australia) Mark Woodforde (x2)	(United States) Gigi Fernández (Belarus) Natalia Zvereva (x2)	(United States) Meredith McGrath (United States) Matt Lucena
1996	(United States) Pete Sampras (x2)	(Germany) Steffi Graf (x2)	(Australia) Todd Woodbridge (Australia) Mark Woodforde (x2)	(United States) Gigi Fernández (Belarus) Natalia Zvereva (x2)	(United States) Lisa Raymond (United States) Patrick Galbraith
1997	(Australia) Patrick Rafter (x2)	(Switzerland) Martina Hingis	(Russia) Yevgeny Kafelnikov (Czech Republic) Daniel Vacek	(United States) Lindsay Davenport (Czech Republic) Jana Novotná	(Netherlands) Manon Bollegraf (United States) Rick Leach
1998	(Australia) Patrick Rafter (x2)	(United States) Lindsay Davenport	(Australia) Sandon Stolle (Czech Republic) Cyril Suk	(Switzerland) Martina Hingis (Czech Republic) Jana Novotná	(United States) Serena Williams (Belarus) Max Mirnyi
1999	(United States) Andre Agassi	(United States) Serena Williams	(Canada) Sébastien Lareau (United States) Alex O'Brien	(United States) Serena Williams (United States) Venus Williams	(Japan) Ai Sugiyama (India) Mahesh Bhupathi
2000	(Russia) Marat Safin	(United States) Venus Williams (x2)	(Australia) Lleyton Hewitt (Belarus) Max Mirnyi	(France) Julie Halard (Japan) Ai Sugiyama	(Spain) Arantxa Sánchez Vicario (United States) Jared Palmer
2001	(Australia) Lleyton Hewitt	(United States) Venus Williams (x2)	(Zimbabwe) Wayne Black (Zimbabwe) Kevin Ullyett	(United States) Lisa Raymond (Australia) Rennae Stubbs	(Australia) Rennae Stubbs (Australia) Todd Woodbridge
2002	(United States) Pete Sampras	(United States) Serena Williams	(India) Mahesh Bhupathi (Belarus) Max Mirnyi	(Spain) Virginia Ruano Pascual (Argentina) Paola Suárez (x3)	(United States) Lisa Raymond (United States) Mike Bryan
2003	(United States) Andy Roddick	(Belgium) Justine Henin	(Sweden) Jonas Björkman (Australia) Todd Woodbridge	(Spain) Virginia Ruano Pascual (Argentina) Paola Suárez (x3)	(Slovenia) Katarina Srebotnik (United States) Bob Bryan
2004	(Switzerland) Roger Federer (x5)	(Russia) Svetlana Kuznetsova	(The Bahamas) Mark Knowles (Canada) Daniel Nestor	(Spain) Virginia Ruano Pascual (Argentina) Paola Suárez (x3)	(Russia) Vera Zvonareva (United States) Bob Bryan
2005	(Switzerland) Roger Federer (x5)	(Belgium) Kim Clijsters	(United States) Bob Bryan (United States) Mike Bryan	(United States) Lisa Raymond (Australia) Samantha Stosur	(Slovakia) Daniela Hantuchová (India) Mahesh Bhupathi
2006	(Switzerland) Roger Federer (x5)	(Russia) Maria Sharapova	(Czech Republic) Martin Damm (India) Leander Paes	(France) Nathalie Dechy (Russia) Vera Zvonareva	(United States) Martina Navratilova (United States) Bob Bryan
2007	(Switzerland) Roger Federer (x5)	(Belgium) Justine Henin	(Sweden) Simon Aspelin (Austria) Julian Knowle	(France) Nathalie Dechy (Russia) Dinara Safina	(Belarus) Victoria Azarenka (Belarus) Max Mirnyi
2008	(Switzerland) Roger Federer (x5)	(United States) Serena Williams	(United States) Bob Bryan (United States) Mike Bryan	(Zimbabwe) Cara Black (United States) Liezel Huber	(Zimbabwe) Cara Black (India) Leander Paes
2009	(Argentina) Juan Martín del Potro	(Belgium) Kim Clijsters (x2)	(Czech Republic) Lukáš Dlouhý (India) Leander Paes	(United States) Serena Williams (United States) Venus Williams	(United States) Carly Gullickson (United States) Travis Parrott
2010	(Spain) Rafael Nadal	(Belgium) Kim Clijsters (x2)	(United States) Bob Bryan (United States) Mike Bryan	(United States) Vania King (Kazakhstan) Yaroslava Shvedova	(United States) Liezel Huber (United States) Bob Bryan
2011	(Serbia) Novak Djokovic	(Australia) Samantha Stosur	(Austria) Jürgen Melzer (Germany) Philipp Petzschner	(United States) Liezel Huber (United States) Lisa Raymond	(United States) Melanie Oudin (United States) Jack Sock
2012	(United Kingdom) Andy Murray	(United States) Serena Williams (x3)	(United States) Bob Bryan (United States) Mike Bryan	(Italy) Sara Errani (Italy) Roberta Vinci	(Russia) Ekaterina Makarova (Brazil) Bruno Soares
2013	(Spain) Rafael Nadal	(United States) Serena Williams (x3)	(India) Leander Paes (Czech Republic) Radek Štěpánek	(Czech Republic) Andrea Hlaváčková (Czech Republic) Lucie Hradecká	(Czech Republic) Andrea Hlaváčková (Belarus) Max Mirnyi
2014	(Croatia) Marin Čilić	(United States) Serena Williams (x3)	(United States) Bob Bryan (United States) Mike Bryan	(Russia) Ekaterina Makarova (Russia) Elena Vesnina	(India) Sania Mirza (Brazil) Bruno Soares
2015	(Serbia) Novak Djokovic	(Italy) Flavia Pennetta	(France) Pierre-Hugues Herbert (France) Nicolas Mahut	(Switzerland) Martina Hingis (India) Sania Mirza	(Switzerland) Martina Hingis (India) Leander Paes
2016	(Switzerland) Stan Wawrinka	(Germany) Angelique Kerber	(United Kingdom) Jamie Murray (Brazil) Bruno Soares	(United States) Bethanie Mattek-Sands (Czech Republic) Lucie Šafářová	(Germany) Laura Siegemund (Croatia) Mate Pavić
2017	(Spain) Rafael Nadal	(United States) Sloane Stephens	(Netherlands) Jean-Julien Rojer (Romania) Horia Tecău	(Chinese Taipei) Chan Yung-jan (Switzerland) Martina Hingis	(Switzerland) Martina Hingis (United Kingdom) Jamie Murray
2018	(Serbia) Novak Djokovic	(Japan) Naomi Osaka	(United States) Mike Bryan (United States) Jack Sock	(Australia) Ashleigh Barty (United States) CoCo Vandeweghe	(United States) Bethanie Mattek-Sands (United Kingdom) Jamie Murray (x2)
2019	(Spain) Rafael Nadal	(Canada) Bianca Andreescu	(Colombia) Juan Sebastián Cabal (Colombia) Robert Farah	(Belgium) Elise Mertens (Belarus) Aryna Sabalenka	(United States) Bethanie Mattek-Sands (United Kingdom) Jamie Murray (x2)
2020	(Austria) Dominic Thiem	(Japan) Naomi Osaka	(Croatia) Mate Pavić (Brazil) Bruno Soares	(Germany) Laura Siegemund (Russia) Vera Zvonareva	No competition
2021	(Russia) Daniil Medvedev	(United Kingdom) Emma Raducanu	(United States) Rajeev Ram (United Kingdom) Joe Salisbury (x3)	(Australia) Samantha Stosur (China) Zhang Shuai	(United States) Desirae Krawczyk (United Kingdom) Joe Salisbury
2022	(Spain) Carlos Alcaraz	(Poland) Iga Świątek	(United States) Rajeev Ram (United Kingdom) Joe Salisbury (x3)	(Czech Republic) Barbora Krejčíková (Czech Republic) Kateřina Siniaková	(Australia) Storm Sanders (Australia) John Peers
2023	(Serbia) Novak Djokovic	(United States) Coco Gauff	(United States) Rajeev Ram (United Kingdom) Joe Salisbury (x3)	(Canada) Gabriela Dabrowski (New Zealand) Erin Routliffe	(Kazakhstan) Anna Danilina (Finland) Harri Heliövaara
2024	(Italy) Jannik Sinner	Aryna Sabalenka (x2)	(Australia) Max Purcell (Australia) Jordan Thompson	(Ukraine) Lyudmyla Kichenok (Latvia) Jeļena Ostapenko	(Italy) Sara Errani (Italy) Andrea Vavassori (x2)
2025	(Spain) Carlos Alcaraz	Aryna Sabalenka (x2)	(Spain) Marcel Granollers (Argentina) Horacio Zeballos	(Canada) Gabriela Dabrowski (New Zealand) Erin Routliffe	(Italy) Sara Errani (Italy) Andrea Vavassori (x2)
2026	(Germany) Alexander Zverev	(Kazakhstan) Elena Rybakina	(United States) Christian Harrison (United Kingdom) Neal Skupski	(Czech Republic) Kateřina Siniaková (United States) Taylor Townsend	(Czech Republic) Karolína Muchová (Czech Republic) Jakub Menšík

=== Wheelchair ===
Year	Singles			Doubles		
Year	Men	Women	Quad	Men	Women	Quad
2005	(Netherlands) Robin Ammerlaan (x2)	(Netherlands) Esther Vergeer (x3)	No competition	(Netherlands) Robin Ammerlaan (France) Michaël Jérémiasz (x2)	(Netherlands) Korie Homan (Netherlands) Esther Vergeer	No competition
2006	(Netherlands) Robin Ammerlaan (x2)	(Netherlands) Esther Vergeer (x3)	No competition	(Netherlands) Robin Ammerlaan (France) Michaël Jérémiasz (x2)	(Netherlands) Jiske Griffioen (Netherlands) Esther Vergeer (x2)	No competition
2007	(Japan) Shingo Kunieda	(Netherlands) Esther Vergeer (x3)	(United Kingdom) Peter Norfolk	(Japan) Satoshi Saida (Japan) Shingo Kunieda	(Netherlands) Jiske Griffioen (Netherlands) Esther Vergeer (x2)	(United States) Nick Taylor (United States) David Wagner
2008	No competition (2008 Paralympics)					
2009	(Japan) Shingo Kunieda (x3)	(Netherlands) Esther Vergeer (x3)	(United Kingdom) Peter Norfolk	(France) Stéphane Houdet (Sweden) Stefan Olsson	(Netherlands) Korie Homan (Netherlands) Esther Vergeer	(United States) Nick Taylor (United States) David Wagner (x3)
2010	(Japan) Shingo Kunieda (x3)	(Netherlands) Esther Vergeer (x3)	(United States) David Wagner (x2)	(Netherlands) Maikel Scheffers (Netherlands) Ronald Vink	(Netherlands) Esther Vergeer (Netherlands) Sharon Walraven (x2)	(United States) Nick Taylor (United States) David Wagner (x3)
2011	(Japan) Shingo Kunieda (x3)	(Netherlands) Esther Vergeer (x3)	(United States) David Wagner (x2)	(France) Stéphane Houdet (France) Nicolas Peifer	(Netherlands) Esther Vergeer (Netherlands) Sharon Walraven (x2)	(United States) Nick Taylor (United States) David Wagner (x3)
2012	No competition (2012 Paralympics)					
2013	(France) Stéphane Houdet	(Netherlands) Aniek van Koot	(South Africa) Lucas Sithole	(France) Michaël Jeremiasz (Netherlands) Maikel Scheffers	(Netherlands) Jiske Griffioen (Netherlands) Aniek van Koot	(United States) Nick Taylor (United States) David Wagner (x3)
2014	(Japan) Shingo Kunieda (x2)	(Japan) Yui Kamiji	(United Kingdom) Andy Lapthorne	(France) Stéphane Houdet (Japan) Shingo Kunieda	(Japan) Yui Kamiji (United Kingdom) Jordanne Whiley	(United States) Nick Taylor (United States) David Wagner (x3)
2015	(Japan) Shingo Kunieda (x2)	(United Kingdom) Jordanne Whiley	(Australia) Dylan Alcott	(France) Stéphane Houdet (United Kingdom) Gordon Reid	(Netherlands) Jiske Griffioen (Netherlands) Aniek van Koot	(United States) Nick Taylor (United States) David Wagner (x3)
2016	No competition (2016 Paralympics)					
2017	(France) Stéphane Houdet	(Japan) Yui Kamiji	(United States) David Wagner	(United Kingdom) Alfie Hewett (United Kingdom) Gordon Reid (x5)	(Netherlands) Marjolein Buis (Netherlands) Diede de Groot	(United Kingdom) Andy Lapthorne (United States) David Wagner (x2)
2018	(United Kingdom) Alfie Hewett (x2)	(Netherlands) Diede de Groot (x6)	(Australia) Dylan Alcott	(United Kingdom) Alfie Hewett (United Kingdom) Gordon Reid (x5)	(Netherlands) Diede de Groot (Japan) Yui Kamiji	(United Kingdom) Andy Lapthorne (United States) David Wagner (x2)
2019	(United Kingdom) Alfie Hewett (x2)	(Netherlands) Diede de Groot (x6)	(United Kingdom) Andy Lapthorne	(United Kingdom) Alfie Hewett (United Kingdom) Gordon Reid (x5)	(Netherlands) Diede de Groot (Netherlands) Aniek van Koot	(Australia) Dylan Alcott (United Kingdom) Andy Lapthorne (x2)
2020	(Japan) Shingo Kunieda (x2)	(Netherlands) Diede de Groot (x6)	(Netherlands) Sam Schröder	(United Kingdom) Alfie Hewett (United Kingdom) Gordon Reid (x5)	(Japan) Yui Kamiji (United Kingdom) Jordanne Whiley	(Australia) Dylan Alcott (United Kingdom) Andy Lapthorne (x2)
2021	(Japan) Shingo Kunieda (x2)	(Netherlands) Diede de Groot (x6)	(Australia) Dylan Alcott	(United Kingdom) Alfie Hewett (United Kingdom) Gordon Reid (x5)	(Netherlands) Diede de Groot (Netherlands) Aniek van Koot (x2)	(Netherlands) Sam Schröder (Netherlands) Niels Vink (x3)
2022	(United Kingdom) Alfie Hewett (x2)	(Netherlands) Diede de Groot (x6)	(Netherlands) Niels Vink	(Spain) Martín de la Puente (France) Nicolas Peifer	(Netherlands) Diede de Groot (Netherlands) Aniek van Koot (x2)	(Netherlands) Sam Schröder (Netherlands) Niels Vink (x3)
2023	(United Kingdom) Alfie Hewett (x2)	(Netherlands) Diede de Groot (x6)	(Netherlands) Sam Schröder	(France) Stéphane Houdet (Japan) Takashi Sanada	(Japan) Yui Kamiji (South Africa) Kgothatso Montjane	(Netherlands) Sam Schröder (Netherlands) Niels Vink (x3)
2024	No competition (2024 Paralympics)					
2025	(Japan) Tokito Oda	(Japan) Yui Kamiji (x2)	(Netherlands) Niels Vink (x2)	(Argentina) Gustavo Fernández (Japan) Tokito Oda	(China) Li Xiaohui (China) Wang Ziying	(Israel) Guy Sasson (Netherlands) Niels Vink
2026	(United Kingdom) Alfie Hewett	(Japan) Yui Kamiji (x2)	(Netherlands) Niels Vink (x2)	(United Kingdom) Alfie Hewett (United Kingdom) Gordon Reid	(Japan) Yui Kamiji (China) Zhu Zhenzhen	(Netherlands) Sam Schröder (Australia) Jin Woodman

=== Junior ===
Year	Singles		Doubles	
Year	Boys'	Girls'	Boys'	Girls'
1973	(United States) Billy Martin (x2)	No competition	No competition	No competition
1974	(United States) Billy Martin (x2)	(South Africa) Ilana Kloss	No competition	No competition
1975	(United States) Howard Schoenfield	(Soviet Union) Natasha Chmyreva	No competition	No competition
1976	(Ecuador) Ricardo Ycaza	(South Africa) Marise Kruger	No competition	No competition
1977	(United States) Van Winitsky	(Argentina) Claudia Casabianca	No competition	No competition
1978	(Sweden) Per Hjertquist	(United States) Linda Siegel	No competition	No competition
1979	(United States) Scott Davis	(United States) Alycia Moulton	No competition	No competition
1980	(United States) Mike Falberg	(United States) Susan Mascarin	No competition	No competition
1981	(Sweden) Thomas Högstedt	(United States) Zina Garrison	No competition	No competition
1982	(Australia) Pat Cash	(United States) Beth Herr	(United States) Jonathan Canter (United States) Michael Kures	(United States) Penny Barg (United States) Beth Herr
1983	(Sweden) Stefan Edberg ‡	(Australia) Elizabeth Minter	(Australia) Mark Kratzmann (Australia) Simon Youl	(United States) Ann Hulbert (Australia) Bernadette Randall
1984	(Australia) Mark Kratzmann	(Bulgaria) Katerina Maleeva	(Mexico) Leonardo Lavalle (Romania) Mihnea Năstase	(Argentina) Mercedes Paz (Argentina) Gabriela Sabatini
1985	(United States) Tim Trigueiro	(Italy) Laura Garrone	(United States) Joey Blake (United States) Darren Yates	(Czechoslovakia) Andrea Holíková (Czechoslovakia) Radomira Zrubáková
1986	(Spain) Javier Sánchez	(United States) Elly Hakami	(Spain) Tomás Carbonell (Spain) Javier Sánchez	(Czechoslovakia) Jana Novotná ‡ (Czechoslovakia) Radomira Zrubáková
1987	(United States) David Wheaton	(Soviet Union) Natalia Zvereva	(Socialist Federal Republic of Yugoslavia) Goran Ivanišević (Italy) Diego Nargiso	(United States) Meredith McGrath (United States) Kimberly Po (x2)
1988	(Venezuela) Nicolás Pereira	(United States) Carrie Cunningham	(United States) Jonathan Stark (United States) John Yancey	(United States) Meredith McGrath (United States) Kimberly Po (x2)
1989	(United States) Jonathan Stark	(United States) Jennifer Capriati	(South Africa) Wayne Ferreira (South Africa) Grant Stafford	(United States) Jennifer Capriati (United States) Meredith McGrath
1990	(Italy) Andrea Gaudenzi	(Bulgaria) Magdalena Maleeva	(Canada) Sébastien Leblanc (Canada) Greg Rusedski	(Australia) Kristin Godridge (Australia) Nicole Pratt
1991	(India) Leander Paes	(Czechoslovakia) Karina Habšudová	(Morocco) Karim Alami (United States) John-Laffnie de Jager	(Australia) Kristin Godridge (Australia) Kirrily Sharpe
1992	(United States) Brian Dunn	(United States) Lindsay Davenport ‡	(United States) Jimmy Jackson (United States) Eric Taino	(United States) Lindsay Davenport ‡ (United States) Nicole London
1993	(Chile) Marcelo Ríos	(Italy) Maria Francesca Bentivoglio	(South Africa) Neville Godwin (South Africa) Gareth Williams	(United States) Nicole London (United States) Julie Steven
1994	(Netherlands) Sjeng Schalken	(United States) Meilen Tu	(Australia) Ben Ellwood (Ecuador) Nicolás Lapentti	(South Africa) Surina De Beer (Netherlands) Chantal Reuter
1995	(Germany) Nicolas Kiefer	(United States) Tara Snyder	(South Korea) Lee Jong-min (Canada) Jocelyn Robichaud	(United States) Corina Morariu (Czech Republic) Ludmilla Varmuzova
1996	(Germany) Daniel Elsner	(Croatia) Mirjana Lučić	(United States) Bob Bryan ‡ (United States) Mike Bryan ‡	(South Africa) Surina de Beer (South Africa) Jessica Steck
1997	(France) Arnaud Di Pasquale	(Zimbabwe) Cara Black	(Chile) Nicolás Massú (Chile) Fernando González	(United States) Marissa Irvin (United States) Alexandra Stevenson
1998	(Argentina) David Nalbandian	(Australia) Jelena Dokic	(United States) K. J. Hippensteel (United States) David Martin	(Belgium) Kim Clijsters (Denmark) Eva Dyrberg
1999	(Finland) Jarkko Nieminen	(Russia) Lina Krasnoroutskaya	(France) Julien Benneteau (France) Nicolas Mahut ‡	(Czech Republic) Daniela Bedáňová (Uzbekistan) Iroda Tulyaganova
2000	(United States) Andy Roddick ‡	(Argentina) María Salerni	(United Kingdom) Lee Childs (United Kingdom) James Nelson	(Argentina) Gisela Dulko (Argentina) María Salerni
2001	(Luxembourg) Gilles Müller	(France) Marion Bartoli	(Czech Republic) Tomáš Berdych (Switzerland) Stéphane Bohli	(Russia) Galina Fokina (Russia) Svetlana Kuznetsova
2002	(France) Richard Gasquet	(Russia) Maria Kirilenko	(Netherlands) Michel Koning (Netherlands) Bas van der Valk	(Belgium) Elke Clijsters (Belgium) Kirsten Flipkens
2003	(France) Jo-Wilfried Tsonga	(Belgium) Kirsten Flipkens	No competition due to inclement weather	
2004	(United Kingdom) Andy Murray ‡	(Netherlands) Michaëlla Krajicek	(United States) Brendan Evans (United States) Scott Oudsema	(New Zealand) Marina Eraković (Netherlands) Michaëlla Krajicek
2005	(United States) Ryan Sweeting	(Belarus) Victoria Azarenka †	(United States) Alex Clayton (United States) Donald Young	(Czech Republic) Nikola Fraňková (Russia) Alisa Kleybanova
2006	(Czech Republic) Dušan Lojda	(Russia) Anastasia Pavlyuchenkova	(United States) Jamie Hunt (United States) Nathaniel Schnugg	(Romania) Mihaela Buzărnescu (Romania) Ioana Olaru
2007	(Lithuania) Ričardas Berankis	(Slovakia) Kristína Kučová	(France) Jonathan Eysseric (France) Jérôme Inzerillo	(Belarus) Ksenia Milevskaya (Poland) Urszula Radwańska
2008	(Bulgaria) Grigor Dimitrov	(United States) CoCo Vandeweghe	(Austria) Niki Moser (Germany) Cedrik-Marcel Stebe	(Thailand) Noppawan Lertcheewakarn (Sweden) Sandra Roma
2009	(Australia) Bernard Tomic	(United Kingdom) Heather Watson	(Hungary) Márton Fucsovics (Chinese Taipei) Hsieh Cheng-peng	(Russia) Valeria Solovyeva (Ukraine) Maryna Zanevska
2010	(United States) Jack Sock	(Russia) Daria Gavrilova	(Peru) Duilio Beretta (Ecuador) Roberto Quiroz	(Hungary) Tímea Babos (United States) Sloane Stephens
2011	(United Kingdom) Oliver Golding	(United States) Grace Min	(Germany) Robin Kern (Germany) Julian Lenz	(Russia) Irina Khromacheva (Netherlands) Demi Schuurs
2012	(Canada) Filip Peliwo	(United States) Samantha Crawford	(United Kingdom) Kyle Edmund (Portugal) Frederico Ferreira Silva	(United States) Gabrielle Andrews (United States) Taylor Townsend ‡
2013	(Croatia) Borna Ćorić	(Croatia) Ana Konjuh	(Poland) Kamil Majchrzak (United States) Martin Redlicki	(Czech Republic) Barbora Krejčíková ‡ (Czech Republic) Kateřina Siniaková ‡
2014	(Australia) Omar Jasika	(Czech Republic) Marie Bouzková	(Australia) Omar Jasika (Japan) Naoki Nakagawa	(Turkey) İpek Soylu (Switzerland) Jil Teichmann
2015	(United States) Taylor Harry Fritz †	(Hungary) Dalma Gálfi	(Canada) Félix Auger-Aliassime (Canada) Denis Shapovalov	(Slovakia) Viktória Kužmová (Russia) Aleksandra Pospelova
2016	(Canada) Félix Auger-Aliassime	(United States) Kayla Day	(Bolivia) Juan Carlos Aguilar (Brazil) Felipe Meligeni Alves	(United States) Jada Hart (United States) Ena Shibahara
2017	(China) Wu Yibing	(United States) Amanda Anisimova †	(Chinese Taipei) Hsu Yu-hsiou (China) Wu Yibing	(Serbia) Olga Danilović (Ukraine) Marta Kostyuk
2018	(Brazil) Thiago Seyboth Wild	(China) Wang Xiyu	(Bulgaria) Adrian Andreev (United Kingdom) Anton Matusevich	(United States) Coco Gauff (United States) Caty McNally †
2019	(Czech Republic) Jonáš Forejtek	(Colombia) Camila Osorio	(United States) Eliot Spizzirri (United States) Tyler Zink	(Latvia) Kamilla Bartone (Russia) Oksana Selekhmeteva
2020	No competition due to the COVID-19 pandemic			
2021	(Spain) Daniel Rincón	(United States) Robin Montgomery	(France) Max Westphal (Hong Kong) Coleman Wong	(United States) Ashlyn Krueger † (United States) Robin Montgomery †
2022	(Spain) Martín Landaluce	(Philippines) Alex Eala	(United States) Ozan Baris (United States) Nishesh Basavareddy	(Czech Republic) Lucie Havlíčková; Diana Shnaider
2023	(Brazil) João Fonseca	(United States) Katherine Hui	(Sweden) Max Dahlin (Estonia) Oliver Ojakäär	(Romania) Mara Gae; Anastasiia Gureva
2024	(Spain) Rafael Jódar	(United Kingdom) Mika Stojsavljevic	(Czech Republic) Maxim Mrva (Japan) Rei Sakamoto	(Morocco) Malak El Allami (Norway) Emily Sartz-Lunde
2025	(Bulgaria) Ivan Ivanov	(Belgium) Jeline Vandromme	(United States) Keaton Hance (United States) Jack Kennedy	(Czech Republic) Alena Kovačková (Czech Republic) Jana Kovačková
2026	(United States) Marcel Latak	(China) Sun Xinran	(France) Aaron Gabet (Spain) Valentín González-Galiño	(United States) Annika Penickova (United States) Kristina Penickova

‡ = a player who won both the junior and senior title.

† = a player who won the junior title and reached the senior final.

=== Junior wheelchair ===
Year	Singles		Doubles	
Year	Boys	Girls	Boys	Girls
2022	(United Kingdom) Ben Bartram	(Brazil) Jade Lanai Oliveira Moreira	(United Kingdom) Ben Bartram (United Kingdom) Dahnon Ward	(Brazil) Jade Lanai (United States) Maylee Phelps
2023	(United Kingdom) Dahnon Ward	(France) Ksénia Chasteau	(United Kingdom) Joshua Johns (United Kingdom) Dahnon Ward	(France) Ksénia Chasteau (United States) Maylee Phelps
2024	(United States) Charlie Cooper	(Japan) Yuma Takamuro	(Netherlands) Ivar van Rijt (Australia) Benjamin Wenzel	(Japan) Rio Okano (Japan) Yuma Takamuro
2025	(Austria) Maximilian Taucher	(United States) Sabina Czauz	(United Kingdom) Ruben Harris (Austria) Maximilian Taucher	(United States) Sabina Czauz (Japan) Seira Matsuoka
2026	(United Kingdom) Matthew Knoesen	(Japan) Seira Matsuoka	(Japan) Hirofumi Inoue (United Kingdom) Matthew Knoesen	(Colombia) Paula Michelle López Meza (Japan) Seira Matsuoka

‡ = a player who won both the junior and senior title.
† = a player who won the junior title and reached the senior final.

== See also ==
Lists of champions of specific events

- List of US Open men's singles champions
- List of US Open women's singles champions
- List of US Open men's doubles champions
- List of US Open women's doubles champions
- List of US Open mixed doubles champions

Other Grand Slam tournament champions

- List of Australian Open champions
- List of French Open champions
- List of Wimbledon champions
