= Niagara International Championship =

Defunct tennis tournament
- Event name: Niagara International Tennis Tournament
- Founded: 1885
- Abolished: 1923
- Location: Niagara-on-the-Lake, Canada
- Surface: Grass / outdoor

The Niagara International Championship was a tennis tournament held in Niagara-on-the-Lake, Canada between 1885 and 1923. The tournament was played on outdoor grass courts at the Queen's Royal Hotel and was held in the second half of August. In the final year, 1923, the tournament was held on the courts of the Clifton Hotel.

== Finals ==
=== Men's singles ===
Year	Champions	Runners-up	Score
1885	(Canada) Henry Gordon Mackenzie	(Canada) Robert Orr Shaw Wood	6–2, 6–1, 6-1
1886			
1887	(United States) E.C. Knight	(United States) S. Burrell	6–4, 6-1
1888	(United States) Ganson Depew	(Canada) Robert Orr Shaw Wood	6–4, 4–6, 3–6, 6–3, 6-0
1889			
1890	(United States) Edward E. Tanner	(Canada) Henry Gordon Mackenzie	6–4, 6–3, 6-1
1891	(United States) J.P. Bowman	(United States) Edward E. Tanner	default
1892	(United States) Arthur E. Fuller	(United States) Fritz K. Ward	6–3, 3–6, 6–3, 6–8, 6-4
1893	(United States) Fritz K. Ward	(United States) Arthur E. Fuller	8–6, 2–6, 6–4, 6–0
1894	(United States) Malcolm G. Chase	(United States) Fritz K. Ward	6–3, 6–1, 8–6
1895	(United States) Carr Neel	(United States) Edwin P. Fischer	6–2, 6–2, 6-1
1896	(United States) Carr Neel	(United States) Fritz K. Ward	6–2, 6–3, 6–3
1897	(United States) William S. Bond	(United States) Malcolm D. Whitman	7–9, 6–3, 2–6, 6–4, 6–3
1898	(United States) William S. Bond	(United States) Leo Ware	6–4, 1–6, 6–4, 10–8
1899	(United States) Raymond D. Little	(United States) William S. Bond	6–2, 5–7, 6–4, 2–6, 6–4
1900	(United States) Raymond D. Little	(United States) Harold H. Hackett	6–2, 4–6, 8–6, 6–2
1901	(United States) Raymond D. Little	(United States) Edwin P. Fischer	6–3, 4–6, 6–2
1902	(United States) Beals C. Wright	(United States) Harold H. Hackett	4–6, 6–4, 4–6, 6–1, 6–1
1903	(United States) Edwin P. Fischer	(United States) Beals C. Wright	walkover
1904	(United States) Alphonzo Edward Bell	(United States) Robert LeRoy	7–5, 6–4, 4–6, 4–6, 6–2
1905	(United States) Irving Wright	(Canada) D.M. Stewart	13–11, 8–6, 6–4
1906	(United States) Irving Wright	(United States) Harry C. Johnson	default
1907	(United States) Irving Wright	(Canada) James F. Foulkes	6–1, 6–4, 6–2
1908	(United States) Nathaniel Niles	(United States) Irving Wright	1–6, 2–6, 6–4, 6–4, 6–4
1909	(United States) Nathaniel Niles	(United States) George C. Janes	6–1, 6–1, 6–1
1910	(United States) Nathaniel Niles	(United States) Henry C. Wick	6–1, 6–4, 6–0
1911	(United States) Edwin H. Whitney	(United States) Fred H. Harris	6–2, 6–2, 5–7, 4–6, 6–3
1912	(United States) Richard Norris Williams	(United States) William S. McEllroy	6–3, 6–3, 6–4
1913	(United States) Clarence Griffin	(United States) Edwin H. Whitney	9–7, 1–6, 6–2, 9–7
1914	(United States) Clarence Griffin	(United States) George M. Church	3–6, 6–1, 6–2, 6–2
1915	No competition (due to WWI)		
1916	No competition (due to WWI)		
1917	No competition (due to WWI)		
1918	No competition (due to WWI)		
1919	(Japan) Ichiya Kumagae	(United States) Vincent (Vinnie) Richards	6-1, 6–4, 6–4.
1920	(United States) Harold Taylor	(United States) James Weber	6–3, 3–6 default
1921	(United States) Robert Lindley Murray	(United States) Clifford Herd	7–5, 8–6, 6–3
1922	(United States) Robert Lindley Murray	(United States) Armand Bruneau	6–2, 6–2, 6–2
1923	(United States) Robert Lindley Murray	(United States) Herbert Bowman	6–2, 4–6, 6–2, 3–6, 6–3

=== Women's singles ===
Year	Champions	Runners-up	Score
1893	(Canada) Maude Delano-Osborne	(Canada) Mrs. Sydney Smith	6–8, 6–3, 6–3
1894	(Canada) Maude Delano-Osborne	(Canada) Mrs. Whithead	4–6, 6–3, 6–4
1896	(United States) Juliette Atkinson	(United States) Kathleen Atkinson	
1897	(United States) Juliette Atkinson	(United States) Mrs. Eustace Smith	6–4, 6–3
1898	(United States) Juliette Atkinson	(United States) Marie Wimer	10–8, 7–9, 6–4, 6–3
1899	(United States) Edith Parker	(United States) Hallie Champlin	4–6, 6–4, 6–2, 4–6, 6–2
1900	(United States) Marie Wimer	(United States) Edith Parker	9–7, 3–6, 6–3, 6–2
1901	(United States) Marion Jones	(United States) Carrie Neely	6-3 7-5 3-6 6-0
1902	(United States) Carrie Neely	(United States) Nona Closterman	6–4, 6–2
1903	(United States) Myrtle McAteer	(United States) Carrie Neely	6–4, 6–3
1905	(Canada) Violet Summerhayes	(United States) Miss Day	6–2, 6–3
1907	(United States) May Sutton	(United States) Edith Rotch	6–2, 6–1
1908	(United States) Marie Wagner	(Canada) Lois Moyes Bickle	6–4, 6–2
1909	(United States) May Sutton	(United States) J.H. Hannam	6–2, 6–1
1910	(Canada) Lois Moyes Bickle	(United States) Alice Day Beard	6–3, 6–4
1911	(United States) Hazel Hotchkiss	(United States) May Sutton	0–6, 7–5, 6–0
1912	(United States) Mary K. Browne	(United States) Dorothy Green	6–2, 7–5
1913	(United States) Louise Riddell Williams	(United States) Mary K. Browne	8–6, 3–6, 6–4
1914	(Canada) Lois Moyes Bickle	(United States) Edith Rotch	6–0, 6–4
