= 1900 in sports =

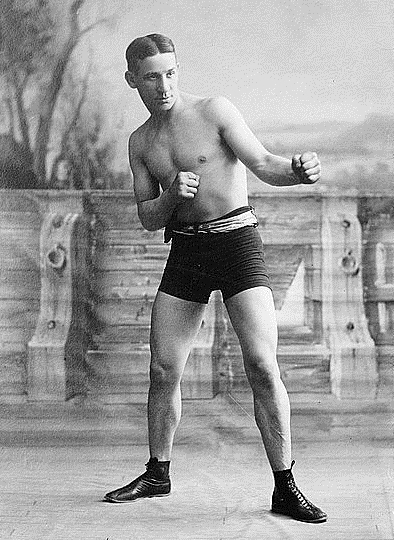
Tommy Ryan was one of boxing's greatest champions

1900 in sports describes the year's events in world sport.

== American football ==
College championship

- College football national championship – Yale Bulldogs

Professional Championships

- Western Pennsylvania championship – Homestead Library & Athletic Club

== Association football ==
Australia

- The Tasmanian Soccer Association is founded

England

- The Football League – Aston Villa 50 points, Sheffield United 48, Sunderland 41, Wolves 39, Newcastle United 36, Derby County 36
- FA Cup final – Bury 4–0 Southampton at Crystal Palace, London.

Germany

- German Football Association (i.e., the Deutscher Fußball-Bund or DFB) founded in Leipzig by representatives of 86 clubs (28 January).
- FC Bayern Munich founded on 27 February as Schwabinger Bayern at a meeting in Munich's Gisela Restaurant by dissident players from a club called MTV 1879. The name was later changed to Bayern Roten (Reds).

Italy

- Lazio of Rome officially founded on January 9.

Olympic Games

- Football at the 1900 Summer Olympics:
1. Upton Park FC (Great Britain)
2. Club Française (France)
3. Université de Bruxelles (Belgium)

Scotland

- Scottish Football League – Rangers
- Scottish Cup final – Celtic 4–3 Queen's Park at Ibrox Park

Uruguay

- Formation of the Uruguayan Football Association (Asociación Uruguaya de Fútbol or AUF)

== Athletics ==
- USA Outdoor Track and Field Championships
- Jack Caffery wins the fourth running of the Boston Marathon

== Australian rules football ==
VFL Premiership

- Melbourne Football Club wins the 4th VFL Premiership: Melbourne 4.10 (34) d Fitzroy 3.12 (30) at East Melbourne

== Baseball ==
National championship

- National League championship – Brooklyn Superbas

Events

- 1900 – Six cities, Boston, Detroit, Milwaukee, Baltimore, Chicago and St. Louis, agree to form baseball's American League.
- The National League contracts from twelve to eight clubs in a circuit of eight cities that will persist through 1952.
- The Western League takes the name "American League" and moves teams into Chicago and Cleveland. The Chicago White Stockings win the pennant in this one season under the new name and the old minor league status.

== Boxing ==
Lineal world champions

- World Heavyweight Championship – James J. Jeffries
- World Middleweight Championship – Tommy Ryan
- World Welterweight Championship – "Mysterious" Billy Smith → William "Matty" Matthews → Eddie Connolly → James "Rube" Ferns → William "Matty" Matthews
- World Lightweight Championship – Frank Erne
- World Featherweight Championship – George Dixon → "Terrible" Terry McGovern
- World Bantamweight Championship – title vacant

Events

- 11 May. After 23 rounds, James J. Jeffries knocks out James J. Corbett to retain the world heavyweight championship.

== Canadian Football ==
- The ORFU bans CIRFU players from its league.
- Ontario Rugby Football Union - Ottawa Rough Riders
- Quebec Rugby Football Union - Brockville
- Manitoba Rugby Football Union - Winnipeg
- Intercollegiate Rugby Football Union - McGill
- Dominion Championship - Ottawa Rough Riders defeat Brockville 17-10

== Cricket ==
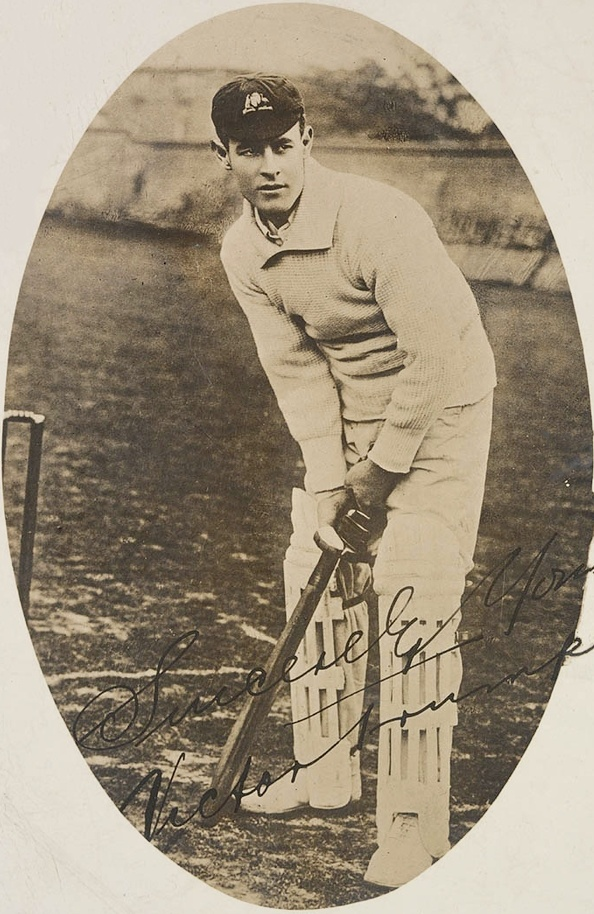
Victor Trumper led the Australian batting averages

Events

- Cricket is suspended in South Africa for the next three seasons on account of the Boer War.
- Yorkshire completes the County Championship season unbeaten, the first time this has happened since the start of the official championship in 1890.
- The Minor Counties Championship ends in a three-way tie between three future first-class clubs.

England

- County Championship – Yorkshire
- Minor Counties Championship – Durham, Glamorgan and Northamptonshire share the title
- Most runs – K S Ranjitsinhji 3065 @ 87.57 (HS 275)
- Most wickets – Wilfred Rhodes 261 @ 13.81 (BB 8–23)
- Wisden Cricketers of the Year – R. E. Foster, Schofield Haigh, George Herbert Hirst, Tom Taylor, John Tunnicliffe

Australia

- Sheffield Shield – New South Wales
- Most runs – Victor Trumper 721 @ 72.10 (HS 208)
- Most wickets – Monty Noble 37 @ 20.64 (BB 6–91)

India

- Bombay Presidency – Europeans shared with Parsees

South Africa

- Currie Cup – not contested

West Indies

- Inter-Colonial Tournament – Barbados

== Figure skating ==
World Figure Skating Championships

- World Men's Champion – Gustav Hügel (Austria)

== Golf ==
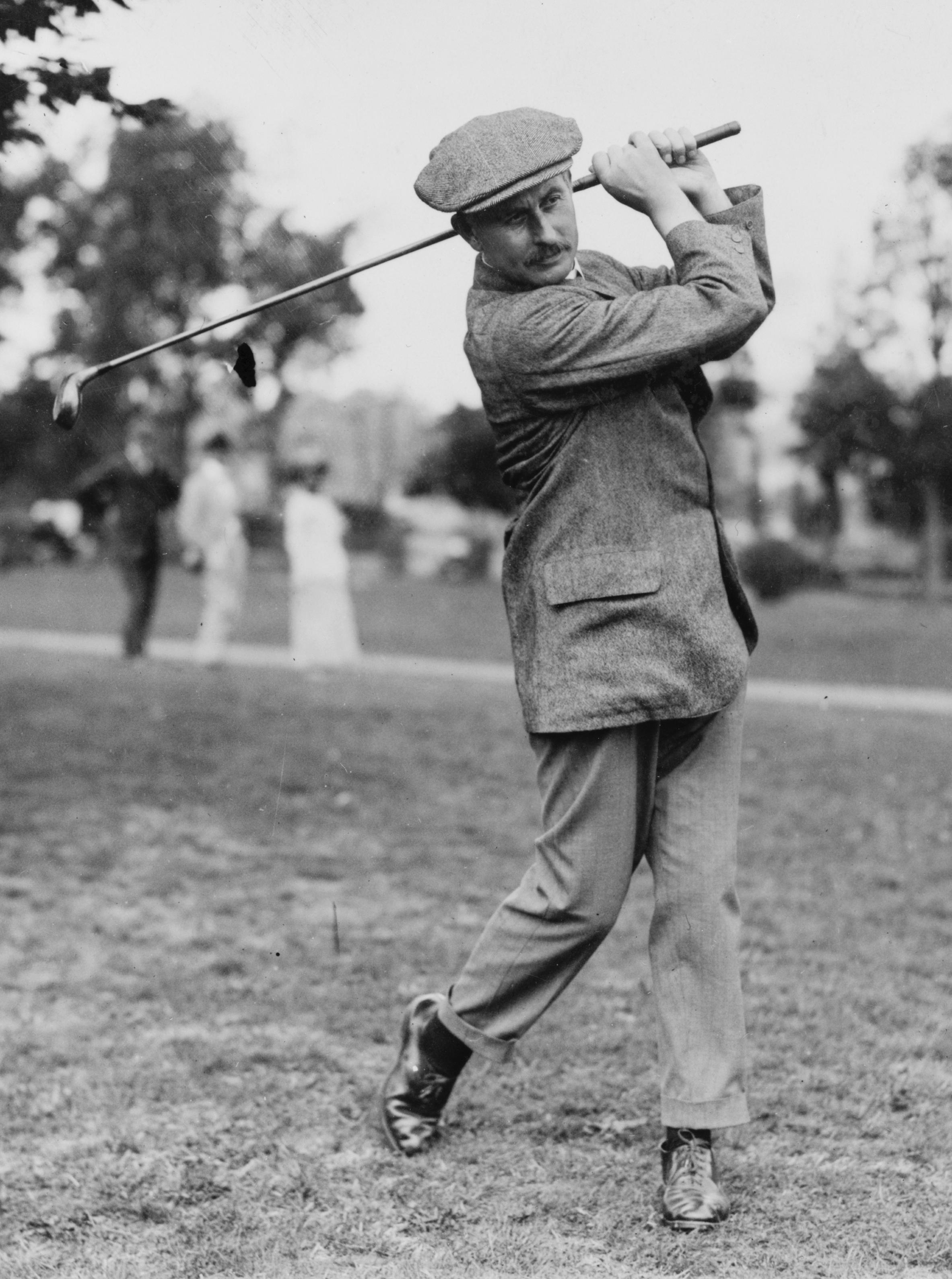
Harry Vardon won his only US Open title in 1900

Major tournaments

- British Open – John Henry Taylor
- U.S. Open – Harry Vardon

Other tournaments

- British Amateur – Harold Hilton
- British Ladies Amateur Golf Championship – Rhona Adair
- US Amateur – Walter Travis
- US Women's Amateur – Frances C. Griscom
- Canadian Amateur Championship – George Lyon
- Olympic Games (Men) – Charles Sands
- Olympic Games (Women) – Margaret Ives Abbott

== Horse racing ==
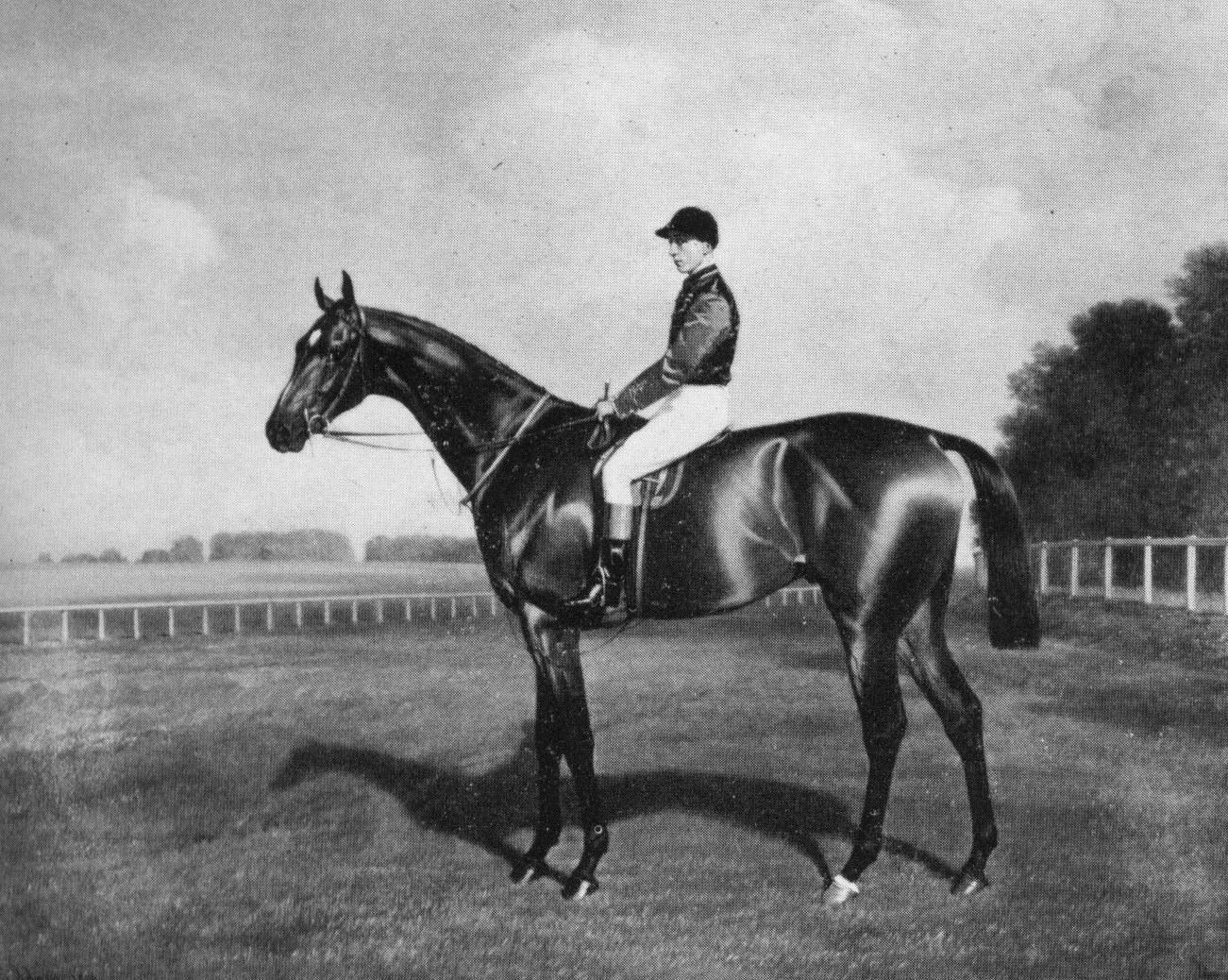
Diamond Jubilee won the Triple Crown in England

England

- Grand National – Ambush II
- 1,000 Guineas Stakes – Winifreda
- 2,000 Guineas Stakes – Diamond Jubilee
- The Derby – Diamond Jubilee
- The Oaks – La Roche
- St. Leger Stakes – Diamond Jubilee

Australia

- Melbourne Cup – Clean Sweep

Canada

- Queen's Plate – Dalmoor

Ireland

- Irish Grand National – Mavis of Meath
- Irish Derby Stakes – Gallinaria

USA

- Kentucky Derby – Lieut. Gibson
- Preakness Stakes – Jean Bereaud
- Belmont Stakes – Ildrim

== Ice hockey ==
Stanley Cup

- 12–16 February — Montreal Shamrocks successfully defends the Stanley Cup, defeating Winnipeg Victorias in a best–of–three series 2–1.
- 5–7 March — Montreal Shamrocks defeats Halifax Crescents in a Cup challenge best–of–three series 2–0.

Other events

- 10 March — Montreal Shamrocks wins the Canadian Amateur Hockey League (CAHL) championship for the second successive season with a regular season record of 7–1.

== Motor racing ==
Gordon Bennett Cup

- James Gordon Bennett, Jr., owner of the New York Herald newspaper and the International Herald Tribune, establishes the Gordon Bennett Cup. He hopes that the creation of an international event will drive automobile manufacturers to improve their cars. Each country is allowed to enter up to three cars, which must be fully built in the country that they represent and entered by that country's automotive governing body. International racing colours are first established in this event.
- The trophy is awarded annually until 1905, after which the Automobile Club de France (ACF) holds the first Grand Prix motor racing event on the Circuit de la Sarthe at Le Mans
- The inaugural Gordon Bennett Cup (Paris to Lyon) is won by Fernand Charron (France) driving a Panhard & Levassor

Paris-Toulouse-Paris Trail

- The Paris-Toulouse-Paris Trail is run on 25–28 July over 1347 km and won by Alfred Velghe (France) driving a Mors in a time of 20:50:09. The race is in retrospect sometimes referred to as the V Grand Prix de l'ACF.

== Olympic Games ==
1900 Summer Olympics

- The 1900 Summer Olympics takes place in Paris but the Olympic status of the games is underplayed and many competitors do not realise that they have participated in the modern Olympics.
- Women take part in the modern Olympics for the first time. The first sportswomen to compete in the games are Mme. Brohy and Mlle. Ohnier of France in croquet. The first female champion is Charlotte Cooper of Great Britain in tennis.
- France wins the most medals (100), and the most gold medals (25).

== Rowing ==
The Boat Race

- 31 March — Cambridge wins the 57th Oxford and Cambridge Boat Race

== Rugby league ==
England

- Championship – not contested
- Challenge Cup final – Swinton 16–8 Salford at Fallowfield Stadium, Manchester
- Lancashire League Championship – Runcorn
- Yorkshire League Championship – Bradford FC

== Rugby union ==
Home Nations Championship

- 18th Home Nations Championship series is won by Wales

== Speed skating ==
Speed Skating World Championships

- Men's All-round Champion – Edvard Engelsaas (Norway)

== Tennis ==
Events

- 9 February — Davis Cup competition is established, the inaugural competition being called the International Lawn Tennis Challenge and involving only Great Britain and the USA.
- 15 August — Dwight F. Davis and Holcombe Ward win the first Davis Cup over Englishmen E.D.Black and H.R.Barett. (3-0, when the last match was halted by rain after Davis won the first set 9–7)

England

- Wimbledon Men's Singles Championship – Reginald Doherty (GB) defeats Sydney Smith (GB) 6–8 6–3 6–1 6–2
- Wimbledon Women's Singles Championship – Blanche Bingley Hillyard (GB) defeats Charlotte Cooper-Sterry (GB) 4–6 6–4 6–4

France

- French Men's Singles Championship – Paul Aymé (France) defeats André Prévost (France): details unknown
- French Women's Singles Championship – Hélène Prévost (France) wins: details unknown

USA

- American Men's Singles Championship – Malcolm Whitman (USA) defeats William Larned (USA) 6–4 1–6 6–2 6–2
- American Women's Singles Championship – Myrtle McAteer (USA) defeats Edith Parker (USA) 6–2 6–2 6–0

Davis Cup

- 1900 International Lawn Tennis Challenge – United States 3–0 British Isles at Longwood Cricket Club (grass) Boston, United States
