= 1900 U.S. National Championships – Women's singles =

Women's singles
- 1900 U.S. National Championships

Final
- Champion: (United States) Myrtle McAteer
- Runner-up: (United States) Edith Parker
- Score: 6–2, 6–2, 6–0

Details
- Draw: 16
- Seeds: –

Events
Singles	men	women
Doubles	men	women
← 1899 ·	U.S. National Championships	· 1901 →

Myrtle McAteer won the singles tennis title of the 1900 U.S. Women's National Singles Championship by defeating Edith Parker 6–2, 6–2, 6–0 in the final of the All Comers' competition. The reigning champion Marion Jones did not defend her title and therefore no challenge round was held. The event was played on outdoor grass courts and held at the Philadelphia Cricket Club in Wissahickon Heights, Chestnut Hill, Philadelphia from June 19 through June 23, 1900.

== Draw ==
=== All Comers' finals ===
Quarterfinals
(United States) Huldah Steel	2	6	5
(United States) Dorothea Morris	6	4	7
(United States) Hallie Champlin	6	2
(United States) Edith Parker	8	6
(United States) Marie Wimer	3	3
(United States) Myrtle McAteer	6	6
(United States) Maud Banks	6	3	6
(United States) Margaret Hunnewell	3	6	3

Semifinals
(United States) Dorothea Morris	6	4	6
(United States) Edith Parker	3	6	1
(United States) Myrtle McAteer	6	7
(United States) Maud Banks	4	5

Finals
(United States) Edith Parker	2	2	0
(United States) Myrtle McAteer	6	6	6

Preceded by 1900 Wimbledon Championships – Women's singles	Grand Slam women's singles	Succeeded by 1901 Wimbledon Championships – Women's singles
