= 1899 U.S. National Championships – Women's singles =

Women's singles
- 1899 U.S. National Championships

Final
- Champion: (United States) Marion Jones
- Runner-up: (United States) Maud Banks
- Score: 6–1, 6–1, 7–5

Details
- Draw: 15
- Seeds: –

Events
Singles	men	women
Doubles	men	women
- U.S. National Championships

Marion Jones won the singles tennis title of the 1899 U.S. Women's National Singles Championship by defeating Maud Banks 6–1, 6–1, 7–5 in the final of the All Comers' competition. The reigning champion Juliette Atkinson did not defend her title and therefore no challenge round was held. The event was played on outdoor grass courts and held at the Philadelphia Cricket Club in Wissahickon Heights, Chestnut Hill, Philadelphia from June 21 through June 24, 1899.

== Draw ==
=== All Comers' finals ===
Quarterfinals
(United States) Maud Banks	7	7
(United States) Myrtle McAteer	5	5
(United States) Carrie Neely	6	6
(United States) Georgina Jones	2	2
(United States) Marion Jones	6	6
(United States) Hallie Champlin	1	2
(United States) Edith Parker	5	6	1
(United States) Jane Craven	7	3	6

Semifinals
(United States) Maud Banks	6	4	6
(United States) Carrie Neely	3	6	1
(United States) Marion Jones	6	6
(United States) Jane Craven	1	0

Finals
(United States) Maud Banks	1	1	5
(United States) Marion Jones	6	6	7

Preceded by 1899 Wimbledon Championships – Women's singles	Grand Slam women's singles	Succeeded by 1900 Wimbledon Championships – Women's singles
