= 1900 U.S. National Championships (tennis) =

- Date: August 13–21 (M); June 19–23 (W)
- Edition: 20th
- Category: Grand Slam
- Surface: Grass
- Location: Newport, R.I., United States (M); Philadelphia, PA, United States (W)

Champions

Men's singles
- (United States) Malcolm Whitman

Women's singles
- (United States) Myrtle McAteer

Men's doubles
- (United States) Holcombe Ward / (United States) Dwight Davis

Women's doubles
- (United States) Hallie Champlin / (United States) Edith Parker

Mixed doubles
- (United States) Margaret Hunnewell / (United States) Alfred Codman
- U.S. National Championships

The 1900 U.S. National Championships (now known as the US Open) was a tennis tournament that took place in June and August of 1900. The women's tournament was held from June 19 to June 23 on the outdoor grass courts at the Philadelphia Cricket Club in Philadelphia, Pennsylvania. The men's tournament was held from August 13 to August 21 on the outdoor grass courts at the Newport Casino in Newport, Rhode Island. It was the 20th U.S. National Championships and the second Grand Slam tournament of the year.

== Finals ==
=== Men's singles ===
(United States) Malcolm Whitman defeated (United States) William Larned 6–4, 1–6, 6–2, 6–2

=== Women's singles ===
(United States) Myrtle McAteer defeated (United States) Edith Parker 6–2, 6–2, 6–0

=== Men's doubles ===
(United States) Holcombe Ward / (United States) Dwight Davis defeated (United States) Fred Alexander / (United States) Raymond Little 6–4, 9–7, 12–10

=== Women's doubles ===
(United States) Hallie Champlin / (United States) Edith Parker defeated (United States) Marie Wimer / (United States) Myrtle McAteer 9–7, 6–2, 6–2

=== Mixed doubles ===
(United States) Margaret Hunnewell / (United States) Alfred Codman defeated (United States) T. Shaw / (United States) George Atkinson 11–9, 6–3, 6–1

Preceded by 1900 Wimbledon Championships	Grand Slams	Succeeded by 1901 Wimbledon Championships
