= 1900 Wimbledon Championships =

- Date: 25 June – 4 July
- Edition: 24th
- Category: Grand Slam
- Surface: Grass
- Location: Worple Road; SW19, Wimbledon, London, United Kingdom
- Venue: All England Lawn Tennis and Croquet Club

Champions

Men's singles
- (United Kingdom of Great Britain and Ireland) Reginald Doherty

Women's singles
- (United Kingdom of Great Britain and Ireland) Blanche Hillyard

Men's doubles
- (United Kingdom of Great Britain and Ireland) Laurence Doherty / (United Kingdom of Great Britain and Ireland) Reginald Doherty
- Wimbledon Championships

The 1900 Wimbledon Championships took place on the outdoor grass courts at the All England Lawn Tennis and Croquet Club in Wimbledon, London, United Kingdom. The tournament ran from 25 June until 4 July. It was the 24th staging of the Wimbledon Championships, and the first Grand Slam tennis event of 1900.

This was the final Wimbledon tournament during the reign of Queen Victoria.

== Champions ==
=== Men's singles ===
(United Kingdom of Great Britain and Ireland) Reginald Doherty defeated (United Kingdom of Great Britain and Ireland) Sydney Smith 6–8, 6–3, 6–1, 5–7, 11–9

=== Women's singles ===
(United Kingdom of Great Britain and Ireland) Blanche Hillyard defeated (United Kingdom of Great Britain and Ireland) Charlotte Cooper 4–6, 6–4, 6–4

=== Men's doubles ===
(United Kingdom of Great Britain and Ireland) Laurence Doherty / (United Kingdom of Great Britain and Ireland) Reginald Doherty defeated (United Kingdom of Great Britain and Ireland) Herbert Roper Barrett / (United Kingdom of Great Britain and Ireland) Harold Nisbet 9–7, 7–5, 4–6, 3–6, 6–3

Preceded by 1899 U.S. National Championships	Grand Slams	Succeeded by 1900 U.S. National Championships
