= Lois Moyes Bickle =

Canadian tennis player

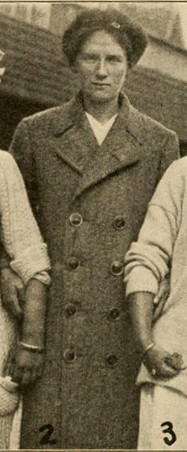
- Moyes, c. 1911
- Full name: Lois Moyes Bickle
- Country (sports): Canada
- Born: 28 July 1881; Bedford Park, Toronto, Ontario, Canada
- Died: 15 November 1952 (aged 71); Ontario, Canada
- Plays: Right-handed

Singles

Grand Slam singles results
- US Open: SF (1909)

Doubles

Grand Slam doubles results
- US Open: F (1909)

Lois Wilkie Moyes Bickle (née Moyes; 28 July 1881 – 15 November 1952) was a female tennis player from Canada who was active in the first decades of the 20th century.

She won a record ten singles titles (1906–1908, 1910, 1913, 1914, 1920–1922, 1924) at the Canadian Championships. In addition she won nine Canadian Championships doubles titles (1910, 1913, 1914, 1919–1924). Eight of these were won partnering Florence Best whom she defeated in the 1913, 1914 and 1920 singles final. In 1913 and 1921 Moyes Bickle also won the mixed doubles title.

In 1910 and 1914 she won the singles title at the Niagara International Tennis Tournament.

Moyes Bickle reached the semifinals of the singles event at the 1909 U.S. Championships, which she lost in straight sets to Louise Hammond. In 1922, she defeated Leslie Bancroft in the finals of the singles event at the U.S. Women's Clay Court Championships in Buffalo, New York.

She married Harold "Harry" Bickle on 28 September 1912 in Deer Park, Toronto.

In 1991, she was inducted into the Canadian Tennis Hall of Fame.

== Grand Slam finals ==
=== Doubles (1 runner-up) ===
| Result | Year | Championship | Surface | Partner | Opponents | Score |
|---|---|---|---|---|---|---|
| Loss | 1909 | U.S. National Championships | Grass | (United States) Dorothy Green | (United States) Hazel Hotchkiss (United States) Edith Rotch | 1–6, 1–6 |
