= Helen Gilleaudeau =

American tennis player

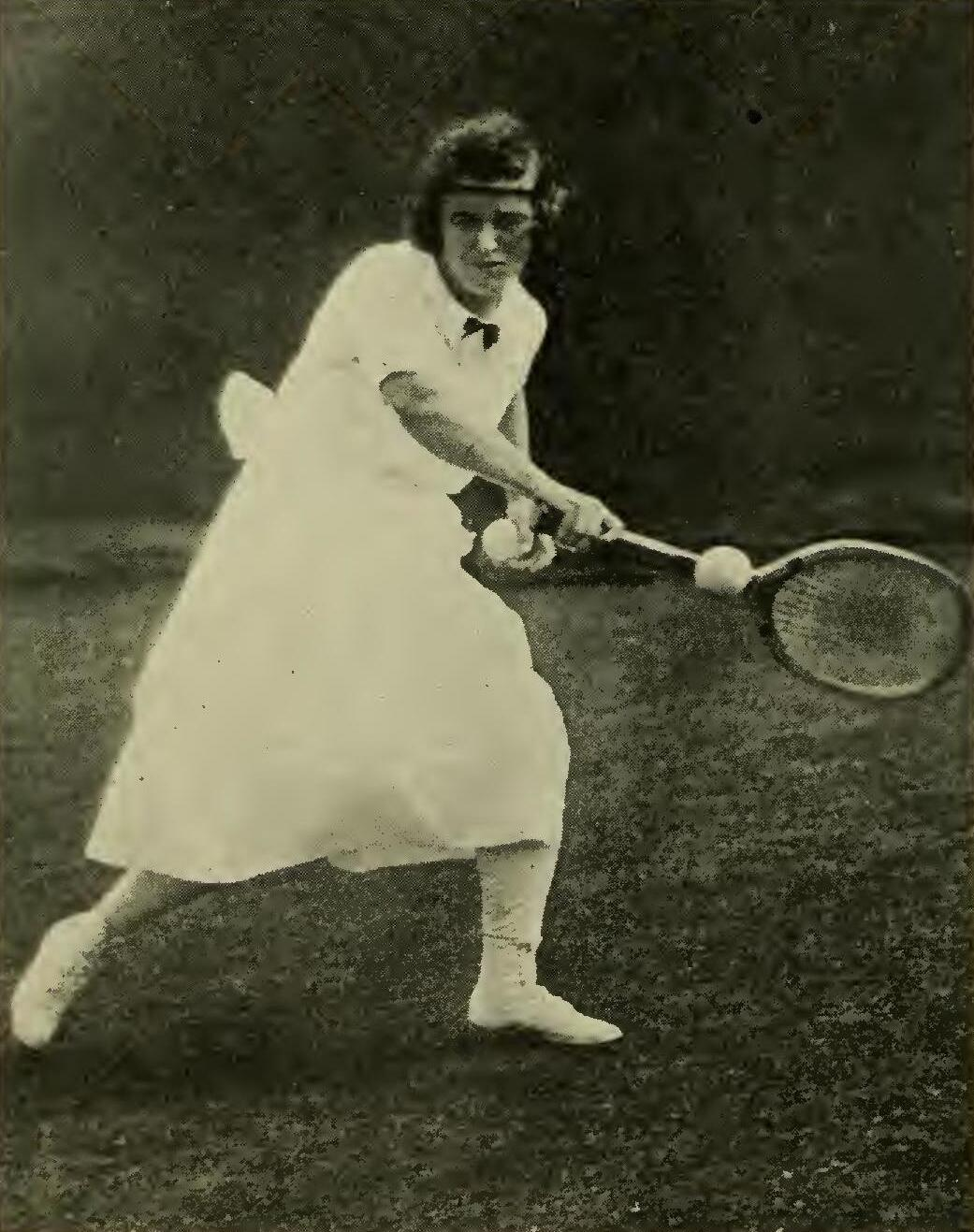
- Country (sports): United States
- Born: 1896; Mamaroneck, New York, US
- Died: 1959
- Plays: Right-handed

Singles

Grand Slam singles results
- US Open: QF (1921)

Doubles

Grand Slam doubles results
- US Open: F (1921)

Helen Claire Gilleaudeau (1896 – 1959) was an American tennis player who was active in the 1920s.

Gilleaudeau competed in the doubles event of the 1921 U.S. National Championships, held at the Longwood Cricket Club in Chestnut Hill, Massachusetts, with her partner Aletta Bailey Morris. They reached the final which was lost in straight sets to Mary Browne and Louise Riddell Williams. In the singles event she reached the quarterfinals where she was beaten by May Sutton Bundy.

She was ranked in the U.S. national top ten in 1919, 1921, 1922, and in 1923 when she reached her highest ranking of No. 5.

Gilleaudeau won the Connecticut State singles championship in 1921, 1922 and 1926.

She married Clifford J. Lockhorn on June 30, 1923 in Mamaroneck. He died in November 1946 after an illness.

== Grand Slam finals ==
=== Doubles: 1 runner-up ===
Result	Year	Championship	Surface	Partner	Opponents	Score
Loss	1921	U.S. National Championships	Grass	(United States) Aletta Bailey Morris	(United States) Mary Browne (United States) Louise Riddell Williams	2–6, 3–6
