= 1900 Wimbledon Championships – Women's singles =

Women's singles
- 1900 Wimbledon Championships

Final
- Champion: (United Kingdom) Blanche Hillyard
- Runner-up: (United Kingdom) Charlotte Cooper
- Score: 4–6, 6–4, 6–4

Details
- Draw: 16
- Seeds: –

Events
Singles	men	women
Doubles	men	women
← 1899 ·	Wimbledon Championships	· 1901 →

Charlotte Cooper defeated Louisa Martin 8–6, 5–7, 6–1 in the All Comers' Final, but the reigning champion Blanche Hillyard defeated Cooper 4–6, 6–4, 6–4 in the challenge round to win the ladies' singles tennis title at the 1900 Wimbledon Championships. Marion Jones (USA) was the first female competitor from overseas.

== Draw ==
=== Key ===
- Q = Qualifier
- WC = Wild card
- LL = Lucky loser
- Alt = Alternate
- SE = Special exempt
- PR = Protected ranking
- ITF = ITF entry
- JE = Junior exempt
- w/o = Walkover
- r = Retired
- d = Defaulted
- SR = Special ranking

=== Challenge round ===
Challenge Round
(United Kingdom) Charlotte Cooper	6	4	4
(United Kingdom) Blanche Hillyard	4	6	6

=== All Comers ===
First round
(United Kingdom) Muriel Robb	6	6
(United Kingdom) Alice Pickering	3	4
(United Kingdom) Charlotte Cooper	7	6
(United Kingdom) Henriette Horncastle	5	2
(United Kingdom) Beryl Tulloch	6	2	6
(United Kingdom) Helen Smythe	3	6	1
(United Kingdom) Edith Greville	5	6	6
(United Kingdom) E.J. Bromfield	7	4	3
(United States) Marion Jones	6	6
(United Kingdom) Ursula Templeman	3	4
(United Kingdom) Ellen Evered	6	9
(United Kingdom) Toupie Lowther	3	7
(United Kingdom) Dorothea Douglass
(United Kingdom) MW Fisher	w/o
(United Kingdom) Louisa Martin	6	6
(United Kingdom) Miss Ireland	0	2

Quarterfinals
(United Kingdom) Muriel Robb	3	7
(United Kingdom) Charlotte Cooper	6	9
(United Kingdom) Beryl Tulloch	5	0
(United Kingdom) Edith Austin Greville	7	6
(United States) Marion Jones	5	2
(United Kingdom) Ellen Evered	7	6
(United Kingdom) Dorothea Douglass	4	3
(United Kingdom) Louisa Martin	6	6

Semifinals
(United Kingdom) Charlotte Cooper	6	6
(United Kingdom) Edith Greville	1	2
(United Kingdom) Ellen Evered	0	2
(United Kingdom) Louisa Martin	6	6

Final
(United Kingdom) Charlotte Cooper	8	5	6
(United Kingdom) Louisa Martin	6	7	1

Preceded by 1899 U.S. National Championships – Women's singles	Grand Slam women's singles	Succeeded by 1900 U.S. National Championships – Women's singles
