= Marie Wimer =

American tennis player (1876–1965)

- Country (sports): United States
- Born: February 11, 1876
- Died: February 9, 1965 (aged 88)

Doubles

Grand Slam doubles results
- US Open: Win (1907); Loss (1898, 1900)

Marie Wimer (February 11, 1876—February 9, 1965) was an American tennis player at the start of the 20th century.

Notably, in 1907, she won the women's doubles at the US Women's National Championship with Carrie Neely.

At the Cincinnati Open she:

- reached the singles semifinals in 1903 and the singles quarterfinals in 1904.
- paired with Myrtle McAteer to win the 1904 doubles title (defeating Winona Closterman and Carrie Neely in the final) and reach the 1903 doubles final (where they fell to Closterman and Neely)

== Grand Slam finals ==
=== Doubles (1 title, 2 runner-ups) ===
| Result | Year | Championship | Surface | Partner | Opponents | Score |
|---|---|---|---|---|---|---|
| Loss | 1898 | U.S. National Championships | Grass | (United States) Carrie Neely | (United States) Juliette Atkinson (United States) Kathleen Atkinson | 1–6, 6–2, 6–4, 1–6 |
| Loss | 1900 | U.S. National Championships | Grass | (United States) Myrtle McAteer | (United States) Edith Parker (United States) Hallie Champlin | 7–9, 2–6, 2–6 |
| Win | 1907 | U.S. National Championships | Grass | (United States) Carrie Neely | (United States) Edna Wildey (United States) Natalie Widley | 6–1, 2–6, 6–4 |
