= Maud Banks =

American tennis player

Maude Banks
- Full name: Maude S. Banks
- Country (sports): (United States)
- Born: September 1879 England; emigrated to the U.S. in 1883
- Died: 1967 England
- Plays: Right-handed

Grand Slam doubles results
- US Open: L (1902)

Grand Slam mixed doubles results
- US Open: L (1897)

Maud Banks of Philadelphia, Pennsylvania was an English-born American tennis champion who played in the latter stages of the 19th century and in the early part of the 20th century.

== Career ==
She reached the singles final of the all-comers tournament at the U.S. National Championships in 1899, a time when women played best-of-five set finals. She lost that final to Marion Jones, 1–6, 1–6, 5–7. She reached the semifinals in both singles and doubles the next year, losing to Myrtle McAteer of Pittsburgh in both matches (Banks teamed with Bessie Rastall and McAteer with Marie Wimer).

She teamed with Winona Closterman of Cincinnati to reach the doubles final at the U.S. National Championships in 1902, losing to the team of Juliette Atkinson and Marion Jones.

Banks also was a quarterfinalist at the U.S. National Championships in 1897, losing to Juliette Atkinson.

At the Cincinnati Masters, Banks reached five finals. She won the singles title in 1902 (over Closterman), and was runner-up in 1900 (falling to McAteer), won doubles titles in 1900 (with McAteer) and 1902 (with Hallie Champlin), and was a mixed doubles runner-up in 1899 (with John Hammond). The Cincinnati tournament began in 1899, making Banks one of its first champions.

== Grand Slam finals ==
=== Doubles (1 runner-up) ===
Result	Year	Championship	Surface	Partner	Opponents	Score
Loss	1902	U.S. Championships	Grass	(United States) Winona Closterman	(United States) Juliette Atkinson (United States) Marion Jones	2–6, 5–7

=== Mixed doubles (1 runner-up) ===
Result	Year	Championship	Surface	Partner	Opponents	Score
Loss	1897	U.S. Championships	Grass	(United States) B.L.C. Griffith	(United States) Laura Henson (United States) D.L. Magruder	4–6, 3–6, 5–7
