= Hallie Champlin Fenton =

American tennis player

Hallie Champlin
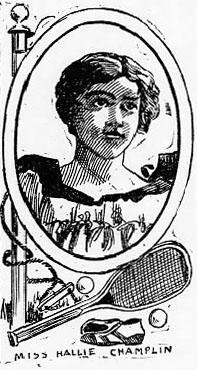
- Drawing of Hallie Champlin (1900)
- Born: Hallie Elizabeth Champlin; October 1, 1872; Missouri
- Died: December 19, 1935 (aged 63); Manhattan, New York
- Occupations: tennis player, painter
- Years active: Hallie Elizabeth Champlin
- Known for: US Women's National Championship (doubles)

Hallie Elizabeth Champlin Hyde Fenton (October 1, 1872 – December 19, 1935) was an American tennis player and painter.

== Early life ==
Hallie Elizabeth Champlin was born October 1, 1872, in St. Louis, Missouri, the daughter of Henry Clay Champlin, a grain dealer, and Susan Isabella Hyde Champlin.

== Tennis career ==
Champlin won the US Women's National Championship in women's doubles with Edith Parker, defeating opponents Marie Wimer and Myrtle McAteer in three straight sets.

In 1902 she won the doubles title at the Cincinnati tournament with Maud Banks against Winona Closterman and Carrie Neely, winning in straight sets.

== Painting career ==
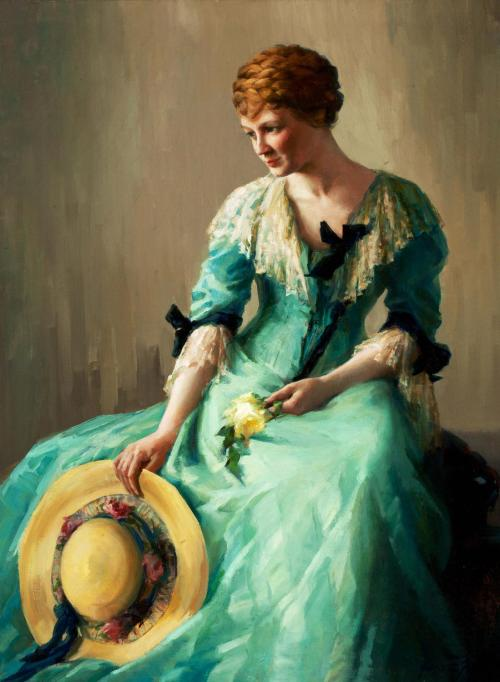
Portrait of a Girl in Blue c. 1900

Fenton studied at the Art Institute of Chicago, the Corcoran School of Art, Washington, D.C., and under Jacques Blanche in Paris. She exhibited work from 1898 to the 1930s and won prizes at the 1907 Illinois State Fair.

== Personal life ==
In 1904, she married Edward Breckenridge Hyde. He died in 1906. In 1912, she married architect Warden H. Fenton.

== Grand Slam finals ==
=== Doubles (1 title) ===
| Result | Year | Championship | Surface | Partner | Opponents | Score |
|---|---|---|---|---|---|---|
| Winner | 1900 | U.S. National Championships | Grass | (United States) Edith Parker | (United States) Marie Wimer (United States) Myrtle McAteer | 9–7, 6–2, 6–2 |
