= Edith Parker =

American tennis player

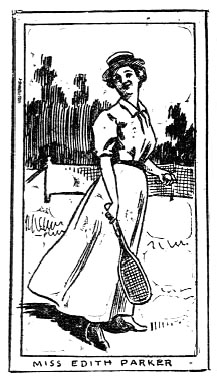
- Drawing of Edith Parker
- Country (sports): United States

Singles

Grand Slam singles results
- US Open: F (1900)

Doubles

Grand Slam doubles results
- US Open: W (1900)

Edith Parker (October 18, 1876 - September 10, 1974) was an American tennis player from the start of the 20th century.

== Career ==
In 1900, she reached the final of the women's singles of the US Women's National Championship, where she was beaten by Myrtle McAteer, but then beat her in the women's doubles final with Hallie Champlin.

At the Cincinnati Open, she reached the All-Comers singles final in 1909 (losing to Edith Hannam), the singles semifinals in 1901 (falling to Juliette Atkinson), 1904 (falling to Winona Closterman), and 1910 (losing to Rhea Fairbairn of Toronto). She also reached the singles quarterfinals in 1899 (losing to Myrtle McAteer).

In 1899 she won the singles title at the Niagara International Tennis Tournament, and reached the final the following year. In 1909 at the Western Tennis Championships she reached the singles final before falling to Carrie Neely.

== Grand Slam finals ==
=== Singles (1 runner-up) ===
Result	Year	Championship	Surface	Opponent	Score
Loss	1900 (Note: This result is for the "all comers' final", the winner of which goes on to play the year's previous winner in the "challenge round", who qualified directly.)	US National Championships	Grass	(United States) Myrtle McAteer	2–6, 2–6, 0–6

=== Doubles (1 title) ===
Result	Year	Championship	Surface	Partner	Opponents	Score
Winner	1900	US National Championships	Grass	(United States) Hallie Champlin	(United States) Marie Wimer (United States) Myrtle McAteer	9–7, 6–2, 6–2

== Personal life ==
On February 15, 1909, in Chicago, Illinois, Parker married Charles Neville Beard (1872-1943). Thereafter she was referred to as "Mrs. C.N. Beard" in newspapers and tennis periodicals.
