= Winona Closterman =

American tennis player

- Country (sports): United States
- Born: September 15, 1877; Cincinnati, Ohio, U.S.
- Died: July 23, 1944 (aged 66)

Winona Closterman (September 15, 1877 in Cincinnati, Ohio – July 23, 1944) was an American female tennis player.

== Career ==
At the U.S. National Championships in 1902, she reached the doubles finals with Maud Banks and the singles quarterfinals (before falling to Carrie Neely).

At the Cincinnati Open, she made 14 finals appearances, winning singles titles in 1901 and 1903, a doubles title in 1903, and mixed doubles titles in 1899, 1902 and 1904. She also reached two singles finals (1902 and 1904), two singles semifinals (1899 and 1900), five other doubles finals (1899–1902 and 1904), and one other mixed doubles final (1903) at Cincinnati. In 1901, she beat two future "International Tennis Hall of Famers" players en route to the singles title. The first was 1899 U.S. singles champ Marion Jones of Nevada in the semifinals (whom she beat 7–5, 6–0) and Juliette Atkinson in the final, whom she beat in straight sets in the best-of-five format, 6–2, 8–6, 6–1. She made a total of six women's singles appearances and finished her career in Cincinnati with a record of 17-4.

At the Western Tennis Championships in Chicago, Closterman won the 1906 singles title (defeating Miriam Steever in the final), and reached three additional singles finals: 1901, 1903 and 1907. She lost the 1901 final and the 1903 final to McAteer, and the 1907 final to Carrie Neely.

At the Southern Women's Tennis Championship, she won the 1903 singles title (defeating Elisabeth Moore in the final, 6-3, 5-7, 6-2) and was a singles finalist in 1901.

== Grand Slam finals ==
=== Doubles (1 runner-up) ===
Result	Year	Championship	Surface	Partner	Opponents	Score
Loss	1902	U.S. Championships	Grass	(United States) Maud Banks	(United States) Juliette Atkinson (United States) Marion Jones	2–6, 5–7
