= Myrtle McAteer =

American tennis player

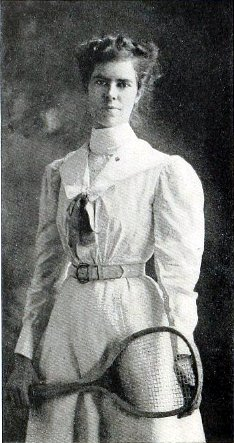
- McAteer in 1901
- Country (sports): United States
- Born: June 12, 1878 Pittsburgh, Pennsylvania, United States
- Died: October 26, 1952 (aged 74) Los Angeles, California, United States

Singles

Grand Slam singles results
- US Open: W (1900)

Doubles

Grand Slam doubles results
- US Open: W (1899, 1901)

Grand Slam mixed doubles results
- US Open: F (1901)

Myrtle McAteer (June 12, 1878 – October 26, 1952) was an American tennis player around the turn of the 20th century.

== Tennis career ==
At the U.S. National Championships (now known as the U.S. Open), McAteer won the singles title in 1900, and doubles titles in 1899 and 1901. She also was a singles finalist in 1901, a doubles finalist in 1900, and a mixed doubles finalist in 1901. She won the 1899 U.S. National Championships in women's doubles tennis, alongside her teammate Dr. Jane Craven.

McAteer was also the first singles champion of the storied event in Cincinnati. She knocked out future International Tennis Hall of Famer Juliette Atkinson in the singles final in 1899 to take the title. In all, she reached 10 finals in Cincinnati, and in addition to her singles title in 1899 she won singles titles in 1900 and 1904, and doubles titles in 1899, 1900, 1904 & 1905. Her other finalist appearances came in singles in 1903 and 1905, and in doubles in 1903.

She made five appearances in Cincinnati and amassed a 14-2 singles record, with her only losses coming in the 1903 final (to Winona Closterman) and the 1905 Challenge Round to May Sutton.

At the U.S. Clay Court Championships in 1915, she was a singles quarterfinalist and a mixed doubles semifinalist.

She died in Los Angeles, California in 1952.

== Grand Slam finals ==
=== Singles (1 title) ===
Result	Year	Championship	Surface	Opponent	Score
Win	1900	US National Championships	Grass	(United States) Edith Parker	6–2, 6–2, 6–0

=== Doubles (2 titles) ===
Result	Year	Championship	Surface	Partner	Opponents	Score
Win	1899	US National Championships	Grass	(United States) Jane Craven	(United States) Maud Banks (United States) Elizabeth Rastall	6–1, 6–1, 7–5
Winner	1901	US National Championships	Grass	(United States) Juliette Atkinson	(United States) Marion Jones (United States) Elisabeth Moore	default

=== Mixed doubles (1 runner-up) ===
Result	Year	Championship	Surface	Partner	Opponents	Score
Loss	1901	U.S. Championships	Grass	(United States) Clyde Stevens	(United States) Marion Jones (United States) Raymond Little	4–6, 4–6, 5–7
