= 1908 in tennis =

This page covers all the important events in the sport of tennis in 1908. It provides the results of notable tournaments throughout the year on both the men's and women's ILTF tennis circuits.

== Australian Open ==
Category	Champion(s)	Finalist(s)	Score
Singles	(United States) Fred Alexander	(Australia) Alfred Dunlop	3–6, 3–6, 6–0, 6–2, 6–3
Doubles	(United States) Fred Alexander (Australia) Alfred Dunlop	(Australia) Granville G. Sharp (New Zealand) Anthony Wilding	6–3, 6–2, 6–1

== French Open ==
Not a Grand Slam event.

== Wimbledon ==
Category	Champion(s)	Finalist(s)	Score
Men's singles	(United Kingdom of Great Britain and Ireland) Arthur Gore	(United Kingdom of Great Britain and Ireland) Herbert Roper Barrett	6–3, 6–2, 4–6, 3–6, 6–4
Women's singles	(United Kingdom of Great Britain and Ireland) Charlotte Sterry	(United Kingdom of Great Britain and Ireland) Agnes Morton	6–4, 6–4
Men's doubles	(United Kingdom of Great Britain and Ireland) Major Ritchie (New Zealand) Anthony Wilding	(United Kingdom of Great Britain and Ireland) Herbert Roper Barrett (United Kingdom of Great Britain and Ireland) Arthur Gore	6–1, 6–2, 1–6, 9–7

== US Open ==
Category	Champion(s)	Finalist(s)	Score
Men's singles	(United States) William Larned	(United States) Beals Wright	6–1, 6–2, 8–6
Women's singles	(United States) Maud Barger-Wallach	(United States) Evelyn Sears	6–3, 1–6, 6–3
Men's doubles	(United States) Fred Alexander (United States) Harold Hackett	(United States) Raymond Little (United States) Beals Wright	6–1, 7–5, 6–2
Women's doubles	(United States) Evelyn Sears (United States) Margaret Curtis	(United States) Carrie Neely (United States) Miriam Steever	6–3, 5–7, 9–7
Mixed doubles	(United States) Edith Rotch (United States) Nathaniel Niles	(United States) Louise Hammond Raymond (United States) Raymond Little	6–4, 4–6, 6–4
