= 1907 in sports =

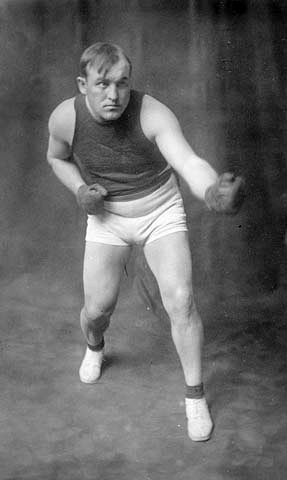
World heavyweight boxing champion Tommy Burns

1907 in sports describes the year's events in world sport.

== American football ==
College championship

- College football national championship – Yale Bulldogs

Events

- For the first time, fans are entertained by a marching band during halftime of the University of Illinois game against the University of Chicago.

== Association football ==
Egypt

- Al Ahly SC founded in Cairo (24 April)

England

- The Football League – Newcastle United 51 points, Bristol City 48, Everton 45, Sheffield United 45, Aston Villa 44, Bolton Wanderers 44
- FA Cup final – The Wednesday 2–1 Everton at Crystal Palace, London

Germany

- National Championship – Freiburger FC 3–1 Viktoria Berlin at Mannheim

Scotland

- Scottish Football League – Celtic
- Scottish Cup final – Celtic 3–0 Hearts at Hampden Park

Turkey

- Fenerbahce SK founded in Istanbul (19 July)

== Athletics ==
Marathon

- 28 November — Johnny Hayes wins the inaugural Yonkers Marathon.

== Australian rules football ==
VFL Premiership

- Carlton wins the 11th VFL Premiership – Carlton 6.14 (50) d South Melbourne 6.9 (45) at Melbourne Cricket Ground (MCG)

== Bandy ==
International

Bandy was included in the winter games held in Helsinki, Finland, similar to the Nordic Games. Finland was represented by the club Polyteknikkojen Urheiluseura (PUS) but the winner of the competition was a combined team from Sweden, which defeated PUS as well as a team from St. Petersburg, Russia.

Sweden

- Swedish national championship inaugurated.
- Championship final – IFK Uppsala 4–1 IFK Gävle

== Baseball ==
World Series

- 8–12 October — Chicago Cubs (NL) defeats Detroit Tigers (AL) to win the 1907 World Series by 4 games to 0 with one tie

Events

- Winnipeg Maroons wins the Northern League Championship

Dominican Republic

- Tigres del Licey, a famous professional baseball club in Dominican Republic, officially founded in Santo Domingo on November 7.

== Boxing ==
Events

- 8 May. Canadian Tommy Burns retains his world heavyweight boxing title by beating Philadelphia Jack O'Brien on points after 20 rounds in Los Angeles.
- Following two successful title defences in California, Burns travels to London, where he defeats British heavyweight champion Gunner Moir.

Lineal world champions

- World Heavyweight Championship – Tommy Burns
- World Light Heavyweight Championship – vacant
- World Middleweight Championship – vacant → Stanley Ketchel
- World Welterweight Championship – William "Honey" Mellody → Mike "Twin" Sullivan
- World Lightweight Championship – Joe Gans
- World Featherweight Championship – Abe Attell
- World Bantamweight Championship – Jimmy Walsh

== Canadian Football ==
- The ORFU and QRFU unite to form the Interprovincial Rugby Football Union (IRFU). The ORFU would remain as a lesser competition for smaller clubs.
- The Saskatchewan Rugby Football Union is founded.
- The Calgary Rugby Football Union is formed. From 1907 to 1911, the champion of the Calgary league would play the champion of the Edmonton league, before the two merged to form a province wide competition.
- Interprovincial Rugby Football Union - Montreal
- Ontario Rugby Football Union - Peterboro
- Manitoba Rugby Football Union - Winnipeg Rowing Club
- Intercollegiate Rugby Football Union - Ottawa College
- Saskatchewan Rugby Football Union - Moose Jaw
- Edmonton defeats Calgary in two games to win the Alberta Rugby Football League
- Dominion Championship - Montreal defeats Peterboro 71-10

== Cricket ==
England

- County Championship – Nottinghamshire
- Minor Counties Championship – Lancashire II
- Most runs – Tom Hayward 2353 @ 45.25 (HS 161)
- Most wickets – Edward Dennett 201 @ 16.05 (BB 8–9)
- Wisden Cricketers of the Year – Albert Hallam, Reggie Schwarz, Frank Tarrant, Bert Vogler, Thomas Wass

Australia

- Sheffield Shield – New South Wales
- Most runs – Bert Hopkins 617 @ 56.09 (HS 171)
- Most wickets – Leonard Garnsey 32 @ 21.93 (HS 6–35)

India

- Bombay Presidency – Hindus

New Zealand

- Plunket Shield – Canterbury

South Africa

- Currie Cup – not contested

West Indies

- Inter-Colonial Tournament – Trinidad and Tobago

== Cycling ==
Tour de France

- Lucien Petit-Breton (France) wins the 5th Tour de France

== Figure skating ==
World Figure Skating Championships

- World Men's Champion – Ulrich Salchow (Sweden)
- World Women's Champion – Madge Syers-Cave (Great Britain)

== Golf ==
Events

- Arnaud Massy (France) becomes the first overseas British Open champion

Major tournaments

- British Open – Arnaud Massy (France)
- US Open – Alec Ross

Other tournaments

- British Amateur – John Ball
- US Amateur – Jerome Travers

== Horse racing ==
England

- Grand National – Eremon
- 1,000 Guineas Stakes – Witch Elm
- 2,000 Guineas Stakes – Slieve Gallion
- The Derby – Orby
- The Oaks – Glass Doll
- St. Leger Stakes – Wool Winder

Australia

- Melbourne Cup – Poseidon

Canada

- King's Plate – Kelvin

Ireland

- Irish Grand National – Sweet Cecil
- Irish Derby Stakes – Orby

United States

- Kentucky Derby – Pink Star
- Preakness Stakes – Don Enrique
- Belmont Stakes – Peter Pan

== Ice hockey ==
Stanley Cup

- 17–21 January — Kenora Thistles defeats Montreal Wanderers two games to none in a Stanley Cup challenge. Kenora, Ontario is the smallest town ever to win the Stanley Cup.
- 16–18 March — Kenora Thistles defeats Brandon, Manitoba to win the Manitoba title and defends the Stanley Cup.
- 23–25 March — Montreal Wanderers regains the Stanley Cup by defeating the Thistles two games to none in a rematch.

Events

- 9 March — Montreal Wanderers wins the Eastern Canada Amateur Hockey Association (ECAHA) title.
- Stratford 14th Regiment defeats Kingston Frontenacs 8–6 to win Ontario Hockey Association title.

== Rowing ==
The Boat Race

- 16 March — Cambridge wins the 64th Oxford and Cambridge Boat Race

== Rugby league ==
- 1907–08 New Zealand rugby tour of Australia and Great Britain

England

- Championship – Halifax
- Challenge Cup final – Warrington 17–3 Oldham at Wheater's Field, Broughton
- Lancashire League Championship – not contested
- Yorkshire League Championship – not contested
- Lancashire County Cup – Broughton Rangers 15–6 Warrington
- Yorkshire County Cup – Bradford F.C. 8–5 Hull Kingston Rovers

Australia

- The newly formed New South Wales Rugby League conducts its first game of rugby: a match in Sydney between New Zealand and New South Wales

== Rugby union ==
Home Nations Championship

- 25th Home Nations Championship series is won by Scotland

== Speed skating ==
Speed Skating World Championships

- Men's All-round Champion – none declared

== Tennis ==
Events

- Norman Brookes (Australia) becomes the first overseas winner of the Wimbledon Men's Singles Championship

Australia

- Australian Men's Singles Championship – Horace Rice (Australia) defeats Harry Parker (Australia) 6–3 6–4 6–4

England

- Wimbledon Men's Singles Championship – Norman Brookes (Australia) defeats Arthur Gore (GB) 6–4 6–2 6–2
- Wimbledon Women's Singles Championship – May Sutton Bundy (USA) defeats Dorothea Douglass Lambert Chambers (GB) 6–1 6–4

France

- French Men's Singles Championship – Max Decugis (France) defeats Robert Wallet (France): details unknown
- French Women's Singles Championship – Comtesse de Kermel (France) defeats d'Elva (France): details unknown

USA

- American Men's Singles Championship – William Larned (USA) defeats Robert LeRoy (USA) 6–2 6–2 6–4
- American Women's Singles Championship – Evelyn Sears (USA) defeats Carrie Neely (USA) 6–3 6–2

Davis Cup

- 1907 International Lawn Tennis Challenge – Australasia 3–2 British Isles at Warple Road (grass) London, United Kingdom
