= List of Grand Slam women's singles finals =

This is a list of all the Grand Slam women's singles finals in tennis. From the 1884 Wimbledon Championships up to and including the 2026 Wimbledon Championships, there have been 467 finals contested between 233 different women, with 133 champions emerging.

== Chronological list ==
☆ Player's first Grand Slam title.
† Player's only Grand Slam final.
‡ Player's only Grand Slam title.

=== Amateur Era ===
Year	Championship	Champion	Runner-up	Score in the final				
Year	Championship	Champion	Runner-up	Set 1	Set 2	Set 3	Set 4	Set 5
1884	Wimbledon	(United Kingdom) Maud Watson^{☆}	(United Kingdom) Lilian Watson^{†}	6–8	6–3	6–3		
1885	Wimbledon	(United Kingdom) Maud Watson	(United Kingdom) Blanche Bingley	6–1	7–5			
1886	Wimbledon	(United Kingdom) Blanche Bingley^{☆}	(United Kingdom) Maud Watson	6–3	6–3			
1887	Wimbledon	(United Kingdom) Lottie Dod^{☆}	(United Kingdom) Blanche Bingley	6–2	6–0			
1887	U.S. National	(United States) Ellen Hansell^{☆‡}	(United States) Laura Knight^{†}	6–1	6–0			
1888	Wimbledon	(United Kingdom) Lottie Dod	(United Kingdom) Blanche Bingley Hillyard	6–3	6–3			
1888	U.S. National	(United States) Bertha Townsend^{☆}	(United States) Ellen Hansell	6–3	7–5			
1889	Wimbledon	(United Kingdom) Blanche Bingley Hillyard	(United Kingdom) Helen Rice	4–6	8–6	6–4		
1889	U.S. National	(United States) Bertha Townsend	(United States) Lida D. Voorhes^{†}	7–5	6–2			
1890	Wimbledon	(United Kingdom of Great Britain and Ireland) Helen Rice^{☆‡}	(United Kingdom of Great Britain and Ireland) May Jacks^{†}	6–4	6–1			
1890	U.S. National	(United States) Ellen Roosevelt^{☆‡}	(United States) Bertha Townsend	6–2	6–2			
1891	Wimbledon	(United Kingdom) Lottie Dod	(United Kingdom) Blanche Bingley Hillyard	6–2	6–1			
1891	U.S. National	(United Kingdom) Mabel Cahill^{☆}	(United States) Ellen Roosevelt	6–4	6–1	4–6	6–3	
1892	Wimbledon	(United Kingdom) Lottie Dod	(United Kingdom) Blanche Bingley Hillyard	6–1	6–1			
1892	U.S. National	(United Kingdom) Mabel Cahill	(United States) Elisabeth Moore	5–7	6–3	6–4	4–6	6–2
1893	Wimbledon	(United Kingdom) Lottie Dod	(United Kingdom) Blanche Bingley Hillyard	6–8	6–1	6–4		
1893	U.S. National	(United States) Aline Terry^{☆‡}	(United States) Augusta Schultz^{†}	6–1	6–3			
1894	Wimbledon	(United Kingdom) Blanche Bingley Hillyard	(United Kingdom) Edith Austin^{†}	6–1	6–1			
1894	U.S. National	(United States) Helen Hellwig^{☆‡}	(United States) Aline Terry	7–5	3–6	6–0	3–6	6–3
1895	Wimbledon	(United Kingdom) Charlotte Cooper^{☆}	(United Kingdom) Helen Jackson^{†}	7–5	8–6			
1895	U.S. National	(United States) Juliette Atkinson^{☆}	(United States) Helen Hellwig	6–4	6–2	6–1		
1896	Wimbledon	(United Kingdom) Charlotte Cooper	(United Kingdom) Alice Pickering^{†}	6–2	6–3			
1896	U.S. National	(United States) Elisabeth Moore^{☆}	(United States) Juliette Atkinson	6–4	4–6	6–2	6–2	
1897	Wimbledon	(United Kingdom) Blanche Bingley Hillyard	(United Kingdom) Charlotte Cooper	5–7	7–5	6–2		
1897	U.S. National	(United States) Juliette Atkinson	(United States) Elisabeth Moore	6–3	6–3	4–6	3–6	6–3
1898	Wimbledon	(United Kingdom) Charlotte Cooper	(United Kingdom) Louisa Martin^{†}	6–4	6–4			
1898	U.S. National	(United States) Juliette Atkinson	(United States) Marion Jones	6–3	5–7	6–4	2–6	7–5
1899	Wimbledon	(United Kingdom) Blanche Bingley Hillyard	(United Kingdom) Charlotte Cooper	6–2	6–3			
1899	U.S. National	(United States) Marion Jones^{☆}	(United States) Maud Banks^{†}	6–1	6–1	7–5		
1900	Wimbledon	(United Kingdom) Blanche Bingley Hillyard	(United Kingdom) Charlotte Cooper	4–6	6–4	6–4		
1900	U.S. National	(United States) Myrtle McAteer^{☆‡}	(United States) Edith Parker^{†}	6–2	6–2	6–0		
1901	Wimbledon	(United Kingdom) Charlotte Cooper Sterry	(United Kingdom) Blanche Bingley Hillyard	6–2	6–2			
1901	U.S. National	(United States) Elisabeth Moore	(United States) Myrtle McAteer	6–4	3–6	7–5	2–6	6–2
1902	Wimbledon	(United Kingdom) Muriel Robb^{☆†‡}	(United Kingdom) Charlotte Cooper Sterry	7–5	6–1			
1902	U.S. National	(United States) Marion Jones	(United States) Elisabeth Moore	6–1	1–0 ret.			
1903	Wimbledon	(United Kingdom) Dorothea Douglass^{☆}	(United Kingdom) Ethel Thomson	4–6	6–4	6–2		
1903	U.S. National	(United States) Elisabeth Moore	(United States) Marion Jones	7–5	8–6			
1904	Wimbledon	(United Kingdom) Dorothea Douglass	(United Kingdom) Charlotte Cooper Sterry	6–0	6–3			
1904	U.S. National	(United States) May Sutton^{☆}	(United States) Elisabeth Moore	6–1	6–2			
1905	Wimbledon	(United States) May Sutton	(United Kingdom) Dorothea Douglass	6–3	6–4			
1905	U.S. National	(United States) Elisabeth Moore	(United States) Helen Homans	6–4	5–7	6–1		
1906	Wimbledon	(United Kingdom) Dorothea Douglass	(United States) May Sutton	6–3	9–7			
1906	U.S. National	(United States) Helen Homans^{☆‡}	(United States) Maud Barger-Wallach	6–4	6–3			
1907	Wimbledon	(United States) May Sutton	(United Kingdom) Dorothea Douglass Lambert Chambers	6–1	6–4			
1907	U.S. National	(United States) Evelyn Sears^{☆‡}	(United States) Carrie Neely^{†}	6–3	6–2			
1908	Wimbledon	(United Kingdom) Charlotte Cooper Sterry	(United Kingdom) Agnes Morton	6–4	6–4			
1908	U.S. National	(United States) Maud Barger-Wallach^{☆‡}	(United States) Evelyn Sears	6–3	1–6	6–3		
1909	Wimbledon	(United Kingdom) Dora Boothby^{☆‡}	(United Kingdom) Agnes Morton	6–4	4–6	8–6		
1909	U.S. National	(United States) Hazel Hotchkiss^{☆}	(United States) Maud Barger-Wallach	6–0	6–1			
1910	Wimbledon	(United Kingdom) Dorothea Douglass Lambert Chambers	(United Kingdom) Dora Boothby	6–2	6–2			
1910	U.S. National	(United States) Hazel Hotchkiss	(United States) Louise Hammond	6–4	6–2			
1911	Wimbledon	(United Kingdom) Dorothea Douglass Lambert Chambers	(United Kingdom) Dora Boothby	6–0	6–0			
1911	U.S. National	(United States) Hazel Hotchkiss	(United States) Florence Sutton^{†}	8–10	6–1	9–7		
1912	Wimbledon	(United Kingdom) Ethel Thomson Larcombe^{☆‡}	(United Kingdom) Charlotte Cooper Sterry	6–3	6–1			
1912	U.S. National	(United States) Mary Browne^{☆}	(United States) Eleonora Sears^{†}	6–4	6–2			
1913	Wimbledon	(United Kingdom) Dorothea Douglass Lambert Chambers	(United Kingdom) Winifred McNair^{†}	6–0	6–4			
1913	U.S. National	(United States) Mary Browne	(United States) Dorothy Green^{†}	6–2	7–5			
1914	Wimbledon	(United Kingdom) Dorothea Douglass Lambert Chambers	(United Kingdom) Ethel Thomson Larcombe	7–5	6–4			
1914	U.S. National	(United States) Mary Browne	(United States) Marie Wagner^{†}	6–2	1–6	6–1		
1915	U.S. National	(Norway) Molla Bjurstedt^{☆}	(United States) Hazel Hotchkiss Wightman	4–6	6–2	6–0		
1916	U.S. National	(Norway) Molla Bjurstedt	(United States) Louise Hammond Raymond	6–0	6–1			
1917	U.S. National	(Norway) Molla Bjurstedt	(United States) Marion Vanderhoef^{†}	4–6	6–0	6–2		
1918	U.S. National	(Norway) Molla Bjurstedt	(United States) Eleanor Goss^{†}	6–4	6–3			
1919	Wimbledon (details)	(France) Suzanne Lenglen^{☆}	(United Kingdom) Dorothea Douglass Lambert Chambers	10–8	4–6	9–7		
1919	U.S. National	(United States) Hazel Hotchkiss Wightman	(United States) Marion Zinderstein	6–1	6–2			
1920	Wimbledon	(France) Suzanne Lenglen	(United Kingdom) Dorothea Douglass Lambert Chambers	6–3	6–0			
1920	U.S. National	(United States) Molla Bjurstedt Mallory	(United States) Marion Zinderstein	6–3	6–1			
1921	Wimbledon	(France) Suzanne Lenglen	(United States) Elizabeth Ryan	6–2	6–0			
1921	U.S. National	(United States) Molla Bjurstedt Mallory	(United States) Mary Browne	4–6	6–4	6–2		
1922	Australasian	(Australia) Margaret Molesworth^{☆}	(Australia) Esna Boyd	6–3	10–8			
1922	Wimbledon	(France) Suzanne Lenglen	(United States) Molla Bjurstedt Mallory	6–2	6–0			
1922	U.S. National	(United States) Molla Bjurstedt Mallory	(United States) Helen Wills	6–3	6–1			
1923	Australasian	(Australia) Margaret Molesworth	(Australia) Esna Boyd	6–1	7–5			
1923	Wimbledon	(France) Suzanne Lenglen	(United Kingdom) Kathleen McKane	6–2	6–2			
1923	U.S. National	(United States) Helen Wills^{☆}	(United States) Molla Bjurstedt Mallory	6–2	6–1			
1924	Australasian	(Australia) Sylvia Lance^{☆‡}	(Australia) Esna Boyd	6–3	3–6	8–6		
1924	Wimbledon	(United Kingdom) Kathleen McKane^{☆}	(United States) Helen Wills	4–6	6–4	6–4		
1924	U.S. National	(United States) Helen Wills	(United States) Molla Bjurstedt Mallory	6–1	6–3			
1925	Australasian	(Australia) Daphne Akhurst^{☆}	(Australia) Esna Boyd	1–6	8–6	6–4		
1925	French	(France) Suzanne Lenglen	(United Kingdom) Kathleen McKane	6–1	6–2			
1925	Wimbledon	(France) Suzanne Lenglen	(United Kingdom) Joan Fry^{†}	6–2	6–0			
1925	U.S. National	(United States) Helen Wills	(United Kingdom) Kathleen McKane	3–6	6–0	6–2		
1926	Australasian	(Australia) Daphne Akhurst	(Australia) Esna Boyd	6–1	6–3			
1926	French	(France) Suzanne Lenglen	(United States) Mary Browne	6–1	6–0			
1926	Wimbledon	(United Kingdom) Kathleen McKane Godfree	(Spain) Lilí Álvarez	6–2	4–6	6–3		
1926	U.S. National	(United States) Molla Bjurstedt Mallory	(United States) Elizabeth Ryan	4–6	6–4	9–7		
1927	Australian	(Australia) Esna Boyd^{☆‡}	(Australia) Sylvia Lance Harper	5–7	6–1	6–2		
1927	French	(Netherlands) Kea Bouman^{☆†‡}	(South Africa) Irene Peacock^{†}	6–2	6–4			
1927	Wimbledon	(United States) Helen Wills	(Spain) Lilí Álvarez	6–2	6–4			
1927	U.S. National	(United States) Helen Wills	(United Kingdom) Betty Nuthall	6–1	6–4			
1928	Australian	(Australia) Daphne Akhurst	(Australia) Esna Boyd	7–5	6–2			
1928	French	(United States) Helen Wills	(United Kingdom) Eileen Bennett	6–1	6–2			
1928	Wimbledon	(United States) Helen Wills	(Spain) Lilí Álvarez	6–2	6–3			
1928	U.S. National	(United States) Helen Wills	(United States) Helen Jacobs	6–2	6–1			
1929	Australian	(Australia) Daphne Akhurst	(Australia) Louie Bickerton^{†}	6–1	5–7	6–2		
1929	French	(United States) Helen Wills	(France) Simonne Mathieu	6–3	6–4			
1929	Wimbledon	(United States) Helen Wills	(United States) Helen Jacobs	6–1	6–2			
1929	U.S. National	(United States) Helen Wills	(United Kingdom) Phoebe Holcroft Watson^{†}	6–4	6–2			
1930	Australian	(Australia) Daphne Akhurst	(Australia) Sylvia Lance Harper	10–8	2–6	7–5		
1930	French	(United States) Helen Wills Moody	(United States) Helen Jacobs	6–2	6–1			
1930	Wimbledon	(United States) Helen Wills Moody	(United States) Elizabeth Ryan	6–2	6–2			
1930	U.S. National	(United Kingdom) Betty Nuthall^{☆‡}	(United States) Anna McCune Harper^{†}	6–1	6–4			
1931	Australian	(Australia) Coral McInnes Buttsworth^{☆}	(Australia) Marjorie Cox Crawford^{†}	1–6	6–3	6–4		
1931	French	(Weimar Republic) Cilly Aussem^{☆}	(United Kingdom) Betty Nuthall	8–6	6–1			
1931	Wimbledon	(Weimar Republic) Cilly Aussem	(Weimar Republic) Hilde Krahwinkel	6–2	7–5			
1931	U.S. National	(United States) Helen Wills Moody	(United Kingdom) Eileen Bennett Whitingstall	6–4	6–1			
1932	Australian	(Australia) Coral McInnes Buttsworth	(Australia) Kathleen Le Messurier^{†}	9–7	6–4			
1932	French	(United States) Helen Wills Moody	(France) Simonne Mathieu	7–5	6–1			
1932	Wimbledon	(United States) Helen Wills Moody	(United States) Helen Jacobs	6–3	6–1			
1932	U.S. National	(United States) Helen Jacobs^{☆}	(United States) Carolin Babcock^{†}	6–2	6–2			
1933	Australian	(Australia) Joan Hartigan^{☆}	(Australia) Coral McInnes Buttsworth	6–4	6–3			
1933	French	(United Kingdom) Peggy Scriven Vivian^{☆}	(France) Simonne Mathieu	6–2	4–6	6–4		
1933	Wimbledon	(United States) Helen Wills Moody	(United Kingdom) Dorothy Round	6–4	6–8	6–3		
1933	U.S. National	(United States) Helen Jacobs	(United States) Helen Wills Moody	8–6	3–6	3–0 ret.		
1934	Australian	(Australia) Joan Hartigan	(Australia) Margaret Molesworth	6–1	6–4			
1934	French	(United Kingdom) Peggy Scriven Vivian	(United States) Helen Jacobs	7–5	4–6	6–1		
1934	Wimbledon	(United Kingdom) Dorothy Round^{☆}	(United States) Helen Jacobs	6–2	5–7	6–3		
1934	U.S. National	(United States) Helen Jacobs	(United States) Sarah Palfrey	6–1	6–4			
1935	Australian	(United Kingdom) Dorothy Round	(United Kingdom) Nancy Lyle^{†}	1–6	6–1	6–3		
1935	French	(Denmark) Hilde Krahwinkel Sperling^{☆} (Note: Krahwinkel Sperling became a dual-citizen of Denmark after marrying in 1933. In January 1934, she declared she would be representing Denmark and had become a member of the Hellerup Idrætsklub.)	(France) Simonne Mathieu	6–2	6–1			
1935	Wimbledon	(United States) Helen Wills Moody	(United States) Helen Jacobs	6–3	3–6	7–5		
1935	U.S. National	(United States) Helen Jacobs	(United States) Sarah Palfrey Fabyan	6–2	6–4			
1936	Australian	(Australia) Joan Hartigan	(Australia) Nancye Wynne	6–4	6–4			
1936	French	(Denmark) Hilde Krahwinkel Sperling	(France) Simonne Mathieu	6–3	6–4			
1936	Wimbledon	(United States) Helen Jacobs	(Nazi Germany) Hilde Krahwinkel Sperling	6–2	4–6	7–5		
1936	U.S. National	(United States) Alice Marble^{☆}	(United States) Helen Jacobs	4–6	6–3	6–2		
1937	Australian	(Australia) Nancye Wynne^{☆}	(Australia) Emily Hood Westacott	6–3	5–7	6–4		
1937	French	(Denmark) Hilde Krahwinkel Sperling	(France) Simonne Mathieu	6–2	6–4			
1937	Wimbledon	(United Kingdom) Dorothy Round	(Poland) Jadwiga Jędrzejowska	6–2	2–6	7–5		
1937	U.S. National	(Chile) Anita Lizana^{☆†‡}	(Poland) Jadwiga Jędrzejowska	6–4	6–2			
1938	Australian	(United States) Dorothy Bundy Cheney^{☆†‡}	(Australia) Dorothy Stevenson^{†}	6–3	6–2			
1938	French	(France) Simonne Mathieu^{☆}	(France) Nelly Adamson Landry	6–0	6–3			
1938	Wimbledon	(United States) Helen Wills Moody	(United States) Helen Jacobs	6–4	6–0			
1938	U.S. National	(United States) Alice Marble	(Australia) Nancye Wynne	6–0	6–3			
1939	Australian	(Australia) Emily Hood Westacott^{☆‡}	(Australia) Nell Hall Hopman	6–1	6–2			
1939	French	(France) Simonne Mathieu	(Poland) Jadwiga Jędrzejowska	6–3	8–6			
1939	Wimbledon	(United States) Alice Marble	(United Kingdom) Kay Stammers^{†}	6–2	6–0			
1939	U.S. National	(United States) Alice Marble	(United States) Helen Jacobs	6–0	8–10	6–4		
1940	Australian	(Australia) Nancye Wynne	(Australia) Thelma Coyne	5–7	6–4	6–0		
1940	U.S. National	(United States) Alice Marble	(United States) Helen Jacobs	6–2	6–3			
1941	U.S. National	(United States) Sarah Palfrey Cooke^{☆}	(United States) Pauline Betz	7–5	6–2			
1942	U.S. National	(United States) Pauline Betz^{☆}	(United States) Louise Brough	4–6	6–1	6–4		
1943	U.S. National	(United States) Pauline Betz	(United States) Louise Brough	6–3	5–7	6–3		
1944	U.S. National	(United States) Pauline Betz	(United States) Margaret Osborne	6–3	8–6			
1945	U.S. National	(United States) Sarah Palfrey Cooke	(United States) Pauline Betz	3–6	8–6	6–4		
1946	Australian	(Australia) Nancye Wynne Bolton	(Australia) Joyce Fitch^{†}	6–4	6–4			
1946	French	(United States) Margaret Osborne^{☆}	(United States) Pauline Betz	1–6	8–6	7–5		
1946	Wimbledon	(United States) Pauline Betz	(United States) Louise Brough	6–2	6–4			
1946	U.S. National	(United States) Pauline Betz	(United States) Doris Hart	11–9	6–3			
1947	Australian	(Australia) Nancye Wynne Bolton	(Australia) Nell Hall Hopman	6–3	6–2			
1947	French	(United States) Patricia Canning Todd^{☆‡}	(United States) Doris Hart	6–3	3–6	6–4		
1947	Wimbledon	(United States) Margaret Osborne	(United States) Doris Hart	6–2	6–4			
1947	U.S. National	(United States) Louise Brough^{☆}	(United States) Margaret Osborne	8–6	4–6	6–1		
1948	Australian	(Australia) Nancye Wynne Bolton	(Australia) Marie Toomey^{†}	6–3	6–1			
1948	French	(France) Nelly Adamson Landry^{☆‡}	(United States) Shirley Fry	6–2	0–6	6–0		
1948	Wimbledon	(United States) Louise Brough	(United States) Doris Hart	6–3	8–6			
1948	U.S. National	(United States) Margaret Osborne duPont	(United States) Louise Brough	4–6	6–4	15–13		
1949	Australian	(United States) Doris Hart^{☆}	(Australia) Nancye Wynne Bolton	6–3	6–4			
1949	French	(United States) Margaret Osborne duPont	(France) Nelly Adamson Landry	7–5	6–2			
1949	Wimbledon	(United States) Louise Brough	(United States) Margaret Osborne duPont	10–8	1–6	10–8		
1949	U.S. National	(United States) Margaret Osborne duPont	(United States) Doris Hart	6–3	6–1			
1950	Australian	(United States) Louise Brough	(United States) Doris Hart	6–4	3–6	6–4		
1950	French	(United States) Doris Hart	(United States) Patricia Canning Todd	6–4	4–6	6–2		
1950	Wimbledon	(United States) Louise Brough	(United States) Margaret Osborne duPont	6–1	3–6	6–1		
1950	U.S. National	(United States) Margaret Osborne duPont	(United States) Doris Hart	6–4	6–3			
1951	Australian	(Australia) Nancye Wynne Bolton	(Australia) Thelma Coyne Long	6–1	7–5			
1951	French	(United States) Shirley Fry^{☆}	(United States) Doris Hart	6–3	3–6	6–3		
1951	Wimbledon	(United States) Doris Hart	(United States) Shirley Fry	6–1	6–0			
1951	U.S. National	(United States) Maureen Connolly^{☆}	(United States) Shirley Fry	6–3	1–6	6–4		
1952	Australian	(Australia) Thelma Coyne Long	(Australia) Helen Angwin^{†}	6–2	6–3			
1952	French	(United States) Doris Hart	(United States) Shirley Fry	6–4	6–4			
1952	Wimbledon	(United States) Maureen Connolly	(United States) Louise Brough	7–5	6–3			
1952	U.S. National	(United States) Maureen Connolly	(United States) Doris Hart	6–3	7–5			
1953	Australian	(United States) Maureen Connolly	(United States) Julia Sampson^{†}	6–3	6–2			
1953	French	(United States) Maureen Connolly	(United States) Doris Hart	6–2	6–4			
1953	Wimbledon	(United States) Maureen Connolly	(United States) Doris Hart	8–6	7–5			
1953	U.S. National	(United States) Maureen Connolly	(United States) Doris Hart	6–2	6–4			
1954	Australian	(Australia) Thelma Coyne Long	(Australia) Jennifer Staley^{†}	6–3	6–4			
1954	French	(United States) Maureen Connolly	(France) Ginette Bucaille^{†}	6–4	6–1			
1954	Wimbledon	(United States) Maureen Connolly	(United States) Louise Brough	6–2	7–5			
1954	U.S. National	(United States) Doris Hart	(United States) Louise Brough	6–8	6–1	8–6		
1955	Australian	(Australia) Beryl Penrose^{☆†‡}	(Australia) Thelma Coyne Long	6–4	6–3			
1955	French	(United Kingdom) Angela Mortimer^{☆}	(United States) Dorothy Head Knode	2–6	7–5	10–8		
1955	Wimbledon	(United States) Louise Brough	(United States) Beverly Baker Fleitz^{†}	7–5	8–6			
1955	U.S. National	(United States) Doris Hart	(United Kingdom) Patricia Ward^{†}	6–4	6–2			
1956	Australian	(Australia) Mary Carter^{☆}	(Australia) Thelma Coyne Long	3–6	6–2	9–7		
1956	French	(United States) Althea Gibson^{☆}	(United Kingdom) Angela Mortimer	6–0	12–10			
1956	Wimbledon	(United States) Shirley Fry	(United Kingdom) Angela Buxton^{†}	6–3	6–1			
1956	U.S. National	(United States) Shirley Fry	(United States) Althea Gibson	6–3	6–4			
1957	Australian	(United States) Shirley Fry	(United States) Althea Gibson	6–3	6–4			
1957	French	(United Kingdom) Shirley Bloomer^{☆‡}	(United States) Dorothy Head Knode	6–1	6–3			
1957	Wimbledon	(United States) Althea Gibson	(United States) Darlene Hard	6–3	6–2			
1957	U.S. National	(United States) Althea Gibson	(United States) Louise Brough	6–3	6–2			
1958	Australian	(United Kingdom) Angela Mortimer	(Australia) Lorraine Coghlan^{†}	6–3	6–4			
1958	French	(Hungary) Zsuzsa Körmöczy^{☆‡}	(United Kingdom) Shirley Bloomer	6–4	1–6	6–2		
1958	Wimbledon	(United States) Althea Gibson	(United Kingdom) Angela Mortimer	8–6	6–2			
1958	U.S. National	(United States) Althea Gibson	(United States) Darlene Hard	3–6	6–1	6–2		
1959	Australian	(Australia) Mary Carter Reitano	(South Africa) Renée Schuurman^{†}	6–2	6–3			
1959	French	(United Kingdom) Christine Truman^{☆‡}	(Hungary) Zsuzsa Körmöczy	6–4	7–5			
1959	Wimbledon	(Brazil) Maria Bueno^{☆}	(United States) Darlene Hard	6–4	6–3			
1959	U.S. National	(Brazil) Maria Bueno	(United Kingdom) Christine Truman	6–1	6–4			
1960	Australian	(Australia) Margaret Smith^{☆}	(Australia) Jan Lehane	7–5	6–2			
1960	French	(United States) Darlene Hard^{☆}	(Mexico) Yola Ramírez	6–3	6–4			
1960	Wimbledon	(Brazil) Maria Bueno	(South Africa) Sandra Reynolds^{†}	8–6	6–0			
1960	U.S. National	(United States) Darlene Hard	(Brazil) Maria Bueno	6–4	10–12	6–4		
1961	Australian	(Australia) Margaret Smith	(Australia) Jan Lehane	6–1	6–4			
1961	French	(United Kingdom) Ann Haydon^{☆}	(Mexico) Yola Ramírez	6–2	6–1			
1961	Wimbledon	(United Kingdom) Angela Mortimer	(United Kingdom) Christine Truman	4–6	6–4	7–5		
1961	U.S. National	(United States) Darlene Hard	(United Kingdom) Ann Haydon	6–3	6–4			
1962	Australian	(Australia) Margaret Smith	(Australia) Jan Lehane	6–0	6–2			
1962	French	(Australia) Margaret Smith	(Australia) Lesley Turner	6–3	3–6	7–5		
1962	Wimbledon	(United States) Karen Hantze Susman^{☆†‡}	(Czechoslovakia) Věra Suková^{†}	6–4	6–4			
1962	U.S. National	(Australia) Margaret Smith	(United States) Darlene Hard	9–7	6–4			
1963	Australian	(Australia) Margaret Smith	(Australia) Jan Lehane	6–2	6–2			
1963	French	(Australia) Lesley Turner^{☆}	(United Kingdom) Ann Haydon-Jones	2–6	6–3	7–5		
1963	Wimbledon	(Australia) Margaret Smith	(United States) Billie Jean Moffitt	6–3	6–4			
1963	U.S. National	(Brazil) Maria Bueno	(Australia) Margaret Smith	7–5	6–4			
1964	Australian	(Australia) Margaret Smith	(Australia) Lesley Turner	6–3	6–2			
1964	French	(Australia) Margaret Smith	(Brazil) Maria Bueno	5–7	6–1	6–2		
1964	Wimbledon	(Brazil) Maria Bueno	(Australia) Margaret Smith	6–4	7–9	6–3		
1964	U.S. National	(Brazil) Maria Bueno	(United States) Carole Caldwell Graebner^{†}	6–1	6–0			
1965	Australian	(Australia) Margaret Smith	(Brazil) Maria Bueno	5–7	6–4	5–2 ret.		
1965	French	(Australia) Lesley Turner	(Australia) Margaret Smith	6–3	6–4			
1965	Wimbledon	(Australia) Margaret Smith	(Brazil) Maria Bueno	6–4	7–5			
1965	U.S. National	(Australia) Margaret Smith	(United States) Billie Jean Moffitt	8–6	7–5			
1966	Australian	(Australia) Margaret Smith	(United States) Nancy Richey	w/o				
1966	French	(United Kingdom) Ann Haydon-Jones	(United States) Nancy Richey	6–3	6–1			
1966	Wimbledon	(United States) Billie Jean King^{☆}	(Brazil) Maria Bueno	6–3	3–6	6–1		
1966	U.S. National	(Brazil) Maria Bueno	(United States) Nancy Richey	6–3	6–1			
1967	Australian	(United States) Nancy Richey^{☆}	(Australia) Lesley Turner	6–1	6–4			
1967	French	(France) Françoise Dürr^{☆†‡}	(Australia) Lesley Turner	4–6	6–3	6–4		
1967	Wimbledon	(United States) Billie Jean King	(United Kingdom) Ann Haydon-Jones	6–3	6–4			
1967	U.S. National	(United States) Billie Jean King	(United Kingdom) Ann Haydon-Jones	11–9	6–4			
1968	Australian	(United States) Billie Jean King	(Australia) Margaret Court	6–1	6–2			

=== Open Era ===
Year	Championship	Champion	Runner-up	Score in the final		
Year	Championship	Champion	Runner-up	Set 1	Set 2	Set 3
1968	French Open	(United States) Nancy Richey^{☆}	(United Kingdom) Ann Haydon-Jones	5–7	6–4	6–1
1968	Wimbledon	(United States) Billie Jean King	(Australia) Judy Tegart-Dalton^{†}	9–7	7–5	
1968	US Open	(United Kingdom) Virginia Wade^{☆}	(United States) Billie Jean King	6–4	6–4	
1969	Australian Open	(Australia) Margaret Court	(United States) Billie Jean King	6–4	6–1	
1969	French Open	(Australia) Margaret Court	(United Kingdom) Ann Haydon-Jones	6–1	4–6	6–3
1969	Wimbledon	(United Kingdom) Ann Haydon-Jones^{☆}	(United States) Billie Jean King	3–6	6–3	6–2
1969	US Open	(Australia) Margaret Court	(United States) Nancy Richey	6–2	6–2	
1970	Australian Open	(Australia) Margaret Court	(Australia) Kerry Melville Reid	6–1	6–3	
1970	French Open	(Australia) Margaret Court	(West Germany) Helga Niessen Masthoff^{†}	6–2	6–4	
1970	Wimbledon	(Australia) Margaret Court	(United States) Billie Jean King	14–12	11–9	
1970	US Open	(Australia) Margaret Court	(United States) Rosemary Casals	6–2	2–6	6–1
1971	Australian Open	(Australia) Margaret Court	(Australia) Evonne Goolagong	2–6	7–6^{7–0}	7–5
1971	French Open	(Australia) Evonne Goolagong^{☆}	(Australia) Helen Gourlay Cawley	6–3	7–5	
1971	Wimbledon	(Australia) Evonne Goolagong	(Australia) Margaret Court	6–4	6–1	
1971	US Open	(United States) Billie Jean King	(United States) Rosemary Casals	6–4	7–6	
1972	Australian Open	(United Kingdom) Virginia Wade	(Australia) Evonne Goolagong	6–4	6–4	
1972	French Open	(United States) Billie Jean King	(Australia) Evonne Goolagong	6–3	6–3	
1972	Wimbledon	(United States) Billie Jean King	(Australia) Evonne Goolagong	6–3	6–3	
1972	US Open	(United States) Billie Jean King	(Australia) Kerry Melville Reid	6–3	7–5	
1973	Australian Open	(Australia) Margaret Court	(Australia) Evonne Goolagong	6–4	7–5	
1973	French Open	(Australia) Margaret Court	(United States) Chris Evert	6–7^{5–7}	7–6^{8–6}	6–4
1973	Wimbledon	(United States) Billie Jean King	(United States) Chris Evert	6–0	7–5	
1973	US Open	(Australia) Margaret Court	(Australia) Evonne Goolagong	7–6	5–7	6–2
1974	Australian Open	(Australia) Evonne Goolagong	(United States) Chris Evert	7–6^{7–5}	4–6	6–0
1974	French Open	(United States) Chris Evert^{☆}	(Soviet Union) Olga Morozova	6–1	6–2	
1974	Wimbledon	(United States) Chris Evert	(Soviet Union) Olga Morozova	6–0	6–4	
1974	US Open	(United States) Billie Jean King	(Australia) Evonne Goolagong	3–6	6–3	7–5
1975	Australian Open	(Australia) Evonne Goolagong	(Czechoslovakia) Martina Navratilova	6–3	6–2	
1975	French Open	(United States) Chris Evert	(Czechoslovakia) Martina Navratilova	2–6	6–2	6–1
1975	Wimbledon	(United States) Billie Jean King	(Australia) Evonne Goolagong	6–0	6–1	
1975	US Open	(United States) Chris Evert	(Australia) Evonne Goolagong Cawley	5–7	6–4	6–2
1976	Australian Open	(Australia) Evonne Goolagong Cawley	(Czechoslovakia) Renáta Tomanová	6–2	6–2	
1976	French Open	(United Kingdom) Sue Barker^{☆†‡}	(Czechoslovakia) Renáta Tomanová	6–2	0–6	6–2
1976	Wimbledon	(United States) Chris Evert	(Australia) Evonne Goolagong Cawley	6–3	4–6	8–6
1976	US Open	(United States) Chris Evert	(Australia) Evonne Goolagong Cawley	6–3	6–0	
1977	Australian Open ^{(January)}	(Australia) Kerry Melville Reid^{☆‡}	(Australia) Dianne Fromholtz Balestrat^{†}	7–5	6–2	
1977	French Open	(Socialist Federal Republic of Yugoslavia) Mima Jaušovec^{☆‡}	(Romania) Florența Mihai^{†}	6–2	6–7	6–1
1977	Wimbledon	(United Kingdom) Virginia Wade	(Netherlands) Betty Stöve^{†}	4–6	6–3	6–1
1977	US Open	(United States) Chris Evert	(Australia) Wendy Turnbull	7–6	6–2	
1977	Australian Open ^{(December)}	(Australia) Evonne Goolagong Cawley	(Australia) Helen Gourlay Cawley	6–3	6–0	
1978	French Open	(Romania) Virginia Ruzici^{☆‡}	(Socialist Federal Republic of Yugoslavia) Mima Jaušovec	6–2	6–2	
1978	Wimbledon	(United States) Martina Navratilova^{☆}	(United States) Chris Evert	2–6	6–4	7–5
1978	US Open	(United States) Chris Evert	(United States) Pam Shriver^{†}	7–5	6–4	
1978	Australian Open	(Australia) Christine O'Neil^{☆†‡}	(United States) Betsy Nagelsen^{†}	6–3	7–6^{7–3}	
1979	French Open	(United States) Chris Evert	(Australia) Wendy Turnbull	6–2	6–0	
1979	Wimbledon	(United States) Martina Navratilova	(United States) Chris Evert	6–4	6–4	
1979	US Open	(United States) Tracy Austin^{☆}	(United States) Chris Evert	6–4	6–3	
1979	Australian Open	(United States) Barbara Jordan^{☆†‡}	(United States) Sharon Walsh^{†}	6–3	6–3	
1980	French Open	(United States) Chris Evert	(Romania) Virginia Ruzici	6–0	6–3	
1980	Wimbledon	(Australia) Evonne Goolagong Cawley	(United States) Chris Evert	6–1	7–6	
1980	US Open	(United States) Chris Evert	(Czechoslovakia) Hana Mandlíková	5–7	6–1	6–1
1980	Australian Open	(Czechoslovakia) Hana Mandlíková^{☆}	(Australia) Wendy Turnbull	6–0	7–5	
1981	French Open	(Czechoslovakia) Hana Mandlíková	(West Germany) Sylvia Hanika^{†}	6–2	6–4	
1981	Wimbledon	(United States) Chris Evert	(Czechoslovakia) Hana Mandlíková	6–2	6–2	
1981	US Open	(United States) Tracy Austin	(United States) Martina Navratilova	1–6	7–6^{7–4}	7–6^{7–1}
1981	Australian Open	(United States) Martina Navratilova	(United States) Chris Evert	6–7^{4–7}	6–4	7–5
1982	French Open	(United States) Martina Navratilova	(United States) Andrea Jaeger	7–6^{8–6}	6–1	
1982	Wimbledon	(United States) Martina Navratilova	(United States) Chris Evert	6–1	3–6	6–2
1982	US Open	(United States) Chris Evert	(Czechoslovakia) Hana Mandlíková	6–3	6–1	
1982	Australian Open	(United States) Chris Evert	(United States) Martina Navratilova	6–3	2–6	6–3
1983	French Open	(United States) Chris Evert	(Socialist Federal Republic of Yugoslavia) Mima Jaušovec	6–1	6–2	
1983	Wimbledon	(United States) Martina Navratilova	(United States) Andrea Jaeger	6–0	6–3	
1983	US Open	(United States) Martina Navratilova	(United States) Chris Evert	6–1	6–3	
1983	Australian Open	(United States) Martina Navratilova	(United States) Kathy Jordan^{†}	6–2	7–6^{7–5}	
1984	French Open	(United States) Martina Navratilova	(United States) Chris Evert	6–3	6–1	
1984	Wimbledon	(United States) Martina Navratilova	(United States) Chris Evert	7–6^{7–5}	6–2	
1984	US Open	(United States) Martina Navratilova	(United States) Chris Evert	4–6	6–4	6–4
1984	Australian Open	(United States) Chris Evert	(Czechoslovakia) Helena Suková	6–7^{4–7}	6–1	6–3
1985	French Open	(United States) Chris Evert	(United States) Martina Navratilova	6–3	6–7^{4–7}	7–5
1985	Wimbledon	(United States) Martina Navratilova	(United States) Chris Evert	4–6	6–3	6–2
1985	US Open	(Czechoslovakia) Hana Mandlíková	(United States) Martina Navratilova	7–6^{7–3}	1–6	7–6^{7–2}
1985	Australian Open	(United States) Martina Navratilova	(United States) Chris Evert	6–2	4–6	6–2
1986	French Open	(United States) Chris Evert	(United States) Martina Navratilova	2–6	6–3	6–3
1986	Wimbledon	(United States) Martina Navratilova	(Czechoslovakia) Hana Mandlíková	7–6^{7–1}	6–3	
1986	US Open	(United States) Martina Navratilova	(Czechoslovakia) Helena Suková	6–3	6–2	
1987	Australian Open	(Czechoslovakia) Hana Mandlíková	(United States) Martina Navratilova	7–5	7–6^{7–1}	
1987	French Open	(West Germany) Steffi Graf^{☆}	(United States) Martina Navratilova	6–4	4–6	8–6
1987	Wimbledon	(United States) Martina Navratilova	(West Germany) Steffi Graf	7-5	6–3	
1987	US Open	(United States) Martina Navratilova	(West Germany) Steffi Graf	7–6^{7–4}	6–1	
1988	Australian Open	(West Germany) Steffi Graf	(United States) Chris Evert	6–1	7–6^{7–3}	
1988	French Open	(West Germany) Steffi Graf	(Soviet Union) Natasha Zvereva^{†}	6–0	6–0	
1988	Wimbledon	(West Germany) Steffi Graf	(United States) Martina Navratilova	5–7	6–2	6–1
1988	US Open	(West Germany) Steffi Graf	(Argentina) Gabriela Sabatini	6–3	3–6	6–1
1989	Australian Open	(West Germany) Steffi Graf	(Czechoslovakia) Helena Suková	6–4	6–4	
1989	French Open	(Spain) Arantxa Sánchez Vicario^{☆}	(West Germany) Steffi Graf	7–6^{8–6}	3–6	7–5
1989	Wimbledon	(West Germany) Steffi Graf	(United States) Martina Navratilova	6–2	6–7^{1–7}	6–1
1989	US Open	(West Germany) Steffi Graf	(United States) Martina Navratilova	3–6	7–5	6–1
1990	Australian Open	(West Germany) Steffi Graf	(United States) Mary Joe Fernández	6–3	6–4	
1990	French Open	(Socialist Federal Republic of Yugoslavia) Monica Seles^{☆}	(West Germany) Steffi Graf	7–6^{8–6}	6–4	
1990	Wimbledon	(United States) Martina Navratilova	(United States) Zina Garrison^{†}	6–4	6–1	
1990	US Open	(Argentina) Gabriela Sabatini^{☆‡}	(West Germany) Steffi Graf	6–2	7–6^{7–4}	
1991	Australian Open	(Socialist Federal Republic of Yugoslavia) Monica Seles	(Czechoslovakia) Jana Novotná	5–7	6–3	6–1
1991	French Open	(Socialist Federal Republic of Yugoslavia) Monica Seles	(Spain) Arantxa Sánchez Vicario	6–3	6–4	
1991	Wimbledon	(Germany) Steffi Graf	(Argentina) Gabriela Sabatini	6–4	3–6	8–6
1991	US Open	(Socialist Federal Republic of Yugoslavia) Monica Seles	(United States) Martina Navratilova	7–6^{7–1}	6–1	
1992	Australian Open	(Socialist Federal Republic of Yugoslavia) Monica Seles	(United States) Mary Joe Fernández	6–2	6–3	
1992	French Open	(Serbia and Montenegro) Monica Seles	(Germany) Steffi Graf	6–2	3–6	10–8
1992	Wimbledon	(Germany) Steffi Graf	(Serbia and Montenegro) Monica Seles	6–2	6–1	
1992	US Open	(Serbia and Montenegro) Monica Seles	(Spain) Arantxa Sánchez Vicario	6–3	6–3	
1993	Australian Open	(Serbia and Montenegro) Monica Seles	(Germany) Steffi Graf	4–6	6–3	6–2
1993	French Open	(Germany) Steffi Graf	(United States) Mary Joe Fernández	4–6	6–2	6–4
1993	Wimbledon	(Germany) Steffi Graf	(Czech Republic) Jana Novotná	7–6^{8–6}	1–6	6–4
1993	US Open	(Germany) Steffi Graf	(Czech Republic) Helena Suková	6–3	6–3	
1994	Australian Open	(Germany) Steffi Graf	(Spain) Arantxa Sánchez Vicario	6–0	6–2	
1994	French Open	(Spain) Arantxa Sánchez Vicario	(France) Mary Pierce	6–4	6–4	
1994	Wimbledon	(Spain) Conchita Martínez^{☆‡}	(United States) Martina Navratilova	6–4	3–6	6–3
1994	US Open	(Spain) Arantxa Sánchez Vicario	(Germany) Steffi Graf	1–6	7–6^{7–3}	6–4
1995	Australian Open	(France) Mary Pierce^{☆}	(Spain) Arantxa Sánchez Vicario	6–3	6–2	
1995	French Open	(Germany) Steffi Graf	(Spain) Arantxa Sánchez Vicario	7–5	4–6	6–0
1995	Wimbledon	(Germany) Steffi Graf	(Spain) Arantxa Sánchez Vicario	4–6	6–1	7–5
1995	US Open	(Germany) Steffi Graf	(United States) Monica Seles	7–6^{8–6}	0–6	6–3
1996	Australian Open	(United States) Monica Seles	(Germany) Anke Huber^{†}	6–4	6–1	
1996	French Open	(Germany) Steffi Graf	(Spain) Arantxa Sánchez Vicario	6–3	6–7^{4–7}	10–8
1996	Wimbledon	(Germany) Steffi Graf	(Spain) Arantxa Sánchez Vicario	6–3	7–5	
1996	US Open	(Germany) Steffi Graf	(United States) Monica Seles	7–5	6–4	
1997	Australian Open	(Switzerland) Martina Hingis^{☆}	(France) Mary Pierce	6–2	6–2	
1997	French Open	(Croatia) Iva Majoli^{☆†‡}	(Switzerland) Martina Hingis	6–4	6–2	
1997	Wimbledon	(Switzerland) Martina Hingis	(Czech Republic) Jana Novotná	2–6	6–3	6–3
1997	US Open	(Switzerland) Martina Hingis	(United States) Venus Williams	6–0	6–4	
1998	Australian Open	(Switzerland) Martina Hingis	(Spain) Conchita Martínez	6–3	6–3	
1998	French Open	(Spain) Arantxa Sánchez Vicario	(United States) Monica Seles	7–6^{7–5}	0–6	6–2
1998	Wimbledon	(Czech Republic) Jana Novotná^{☆‡}	(France) Nathalie Tauziat^{†}	6–4	7–6^{7–2}	
1998	US Open	(United States) Lindsay Davenport^{☆}	(Switzerland) Martina Hingis	6–3	7–5	
1999	Australian Open	(Switzerland) Martina Hingis	(France) Amélie Mauresmo	6–2	6–3	
1999	French Open	(Germany) Steffi Graf	(Switzerland) Martina Hingis	4–6	7–5	6–2
1999	Wimbledon	(United States) Lindsay Davenport	(Germany) Steffi Graf	6–4	7–5	
1999	US Open	(United States) Serena Williams^{☆}	(Switzerland) Martina Hingis	6–3	7–6^{7–4}	
2000	Australian Open	(United States) Lindsay Davenport	(Switzerland) Martina Hingis	6–1	7–5	
2000	French Open	(France) Mary Pierce	(Spain) Conchita Martínez	6–2	7–5	
2000	Wimbledon	(United States) Venus Williams^{☆}	(United States) Lindsay Davenport	6–3	7–6^{7–3}	
2000	US Open	(United States) Venus Williams	(United States) Lindsay Davenport	6–4	7–5	
2001	Australian Open	(United States) Jennifer Capriati^{☆}	(Switzerland) Martina Hingis	6–4	6–3	
2001	French Open	(United States) Jennifer Capriati	(Belgium) Kim Clijsters	1–6	6–4	12–10
2001	Wimbledon	(United States) Venus Williams	(Belgium) Justine Henin	6–1	3–6	6–0
2001	US Open	(United States) Venus Williams	(United States) Serena Williams	6–2	6–4	
2002	Australian Open	(United States) Jennifer Capriati	(Switzerland) Martina Hingis	4–6	7–6^{9–7}	6–2
2002	French Open	(United States) Serena Williams	(United States) Venus Williams	7–5	6–3	
2002	Wimbledon	(United States) Serena Williams	(United States) Venus Williams	7–6^{7–4}	6–3	
2002	US Open	(United States) Serena Williams	(United States) Venus Williams	6–4	6–3	
2003	Australian Open	(United States) Serena Williams	(United States) Venus Williams	7–6^{7–4}	3–6	6–4
2003	French Open	(Belgium) Justine Henin^{☆}	(Belgium) Kim Clijsters	6–0	6–4	
2003	Wimbledon	(United States) Serena Williams	(United States) Venus Williams	4–6	6–4	6–2
2003	US Open	(Belgium) Justine Henin	(Belgium) Kim Clijsters	7–5	6–1	
2004	Australian Open	(Belgium) Justine Henin	(Belgium) Kim Clijsters	6–3	4–6	6–3
2004	French Open	(Russia) Anastasia Myskina^{☆†‡}	(Russia) Elena Dementieva	6–1	6–2	
2004	Wimbledon	(Russia) Maria Sharapova^{☆}	(United States) Serena Williams	6–1	6–4	
2004	US Open	(Russia) Svetlana Kuznetsova^{☆}	(Russia) Elena Dementieva	6–3	7–5	
2005	Australian Open	(United States) Serena Williams	(United States) Lindsay Davenport	2–6	6–3	6–0
2005	French Open	(Belgium) Justine Henin	(France) Mary Pierce	6–1	6–1	
2005	Wimbledon	(United States) Venus Williams	(United States) Lindsay Davenport	4–6	7–6^{7–4}	9–7
2005	US Open	(Belgium) Kim Clijsters^{☆}	(France) Mary Pierce	6–3	6–1	
2006	Australian Open	(France) Amélie Mauresmo^{☆}	(Belgium) Justine Henin	6–1	2–0 ret.	
2006	French Open	(Belgium) Justine Henin	(Russia) Svetlana Kuznetsova	6–4	6–4	
2006	Wimbledon	(France) Amélie Mauresmo	(Belgium) Justine Henin	2–6	6–3	6–4
2006	US Open	(Russia) Maria Sharapova	(Belgium) Justine Henin	6–4	6–4	
2007	Australian Open	(United States) Serena Williams	(Russia) Maria Sharapova	6–1	6–2	
2007	French Open	(Belgium) Justine Henin	(Serbia) Ana Ivanovic	6–1	6–2	
2007	Wimbledon	(United States) Venus Williams	(France) Marion Bartoli	6–4	6–1	
2007	US Open	(Belgium) Justine Henin	(Russia) Svetlana Kuznetsova	6–1	6–3	
2008	Australian Open	(Russia) Maria Sharapova	(Serbia) Ana Ivanovic	7–5	6–3	
2008	French Open	(Serbia) Ana Ivanovic^{☆‡}	(Russia) Dinara Safina	6–4	6–3	
2008	Wimbledon	(United States) Venus Williams	(United States) Serena Williams	7–5	6–4	
2008	US Open	(United States) Serena Williams	(Serbia) Jelena Janković^{†}	6–4	7–5	
2009	Australian Open	(United States) Serena Williams	(Russia) Dinara Safina	6–0	6–3	
2009	French Open	(Russia) Svetlana Kuznetsova	(Russia) Dinara Safina	6–4	6–2	
2009	Wimbledon	(United States) Serena Williams	(United States) Venus Williams	7–6^{7–3}	6–2	
2009	US Open	(Belgium) Kim Clijsters	(Denmark) Caroline Wozniacki	7–5	6–3	
2010	Australian Open	(United States) Serena Williams	(Belgium) Justine Henin	6–4	3–6	6–2
2010	French Open	(Italy) Francesca Schiavone^{☆‡}	(Australia) Samantha Stosur	6–4	7–6^{7–2}	
2010	Wimbledon	(United States) Serena Williams	(Russia) Vera Zvonareva	6–3	6–2	
2010	US Open	(Belgium) Kim Clijsters	(Russia) Vera Zvonareva	6–2	6–1	
2011	Australian Open	(Belgium) Kim Clijsters	(China) Li Na	3–6	6–3	6–3
2011	French Open	(China) Li Na^{☆}	(Italy) Francesca Schiavone	6–4	7–6^{7–0}	
2011	Wimbledon	(Czech Republic) Petra Kvitová^{☆}	(Russia) Maria Sharapova	6–3	6–4	
2011	US Open	(Australia) Samantha Stosur^{☆‡}	(United States) Serena Williams	6–2	6–3	
2012	Australian Open	(Belarus) Victoria Azarenka^{☆}	(Russia) Maria Sharapova	6–3	6–0	
2012	French Open	(Russia) Maria Sharapova	(Italy) Sara Errani^{†}	6–3	6–2	
2012	Wimbledon	(United States) Serena Williams	(Poland) Agnieszka Radwańska^{†}	6–1	5–7	6–2
2012	US Open	(United States) Serena Williams	(Belarus) Victoria Azarenka	6–2	2–6	7–5
2013	Australian Open	(Belarus) Victoria Azarenka	(China) Li Na	4–6	6–4	6–3
2013	French Open	(United States) Serena Williams	(Russia) Maria Sharapova	6–4	6–4	
2013	Wimbledon	(France) Marion Bartoli^{☆‡}	(Germany) Sabine Lisicki^{†}	6–1	6–4	
2013	US Open	(United States) Serena Williams	(Belarus) Victoria Azarenka	7–5	6–7^{6–8}	6–1
2014	Australian Open	(China) Li Na	(Slovakia) Dominika Cibulková^{†}	7–6^{7–3}	6–0	
2014	French Open	(Russia) Maria Sharapova	(Romania) Simona Halep	6–4	6–7^{5–7}	6–4
2014	Wimbledon	(Czech Republic) Petra Kvitová	(Canada) Eugenie Bouchard^{†}	6–3	6–0	
2014	US Open	(United States) Serena Williams	(Denmark) Caroline Wozniacki	6–3	6–3	
2015	Australian Open	(United States) Serena Williams	(Russia) Maria Sharapova	6–3	7–6^{7–5}	
2015	French Open	(United States) Serena Williams	(Czech Republic) Lucie Šafářová^{†}	6–3	6–7^{2–7}	6–2
2015	Wimbledon	(United States) Serena Williams	(Spain) Garbiñe Muguruza	6–4	6–4	
2015	US Open	(Italy) Flavia Pennetta^{☆†‡}	(Italy) Roberta Vinci^{†}	7–6^{7–4}	6–2	
2016	Australian Open	(Germany) Angelique Kerber^{☆}	(United States) Serena Williams	6–4	3–6	6–4
2016	French Open	(Spain) Garbiñe Muguruza^{☆}	(United States) Serena Williams	7–5	6–4	
2016	Wimbledon	(United States) Serena Williams	(Germany) Angelique Kerber	7–5	6–3	
2016	US Open	(Germany) Angelique Kerber	(Czech Republic) Karolína Plíšková	6–3	4–6	6–4
2017	Australian Open	(United States) Serena Williams	(United States) Venus Williams	6–4	6–4	
2017	French Open	(Latvia) Jeļena Ostapenko^{☆†‡}	(Romania) Simona Halep	4–6	6–4	6–3
2017	Wimbledon	(Spain) Garbiñe Muguruza	(United States) Venus Williams	7–5	6–0	
2017	US Open	(United States) Sloane Stephens^{☆‡}	(United States) Madison Keys	6–3	6–0	
2018	Australian Open	(Denmark) Caroline Wozniacki^{☆‡}	(Romania) Simona Halep	7–6^{7–2}	3–6	6–4
2018	French Open	(Romania) Simona Halep^{☆}	(United States) Sloane Stephens	3–6	6–4	6–1
2018	Wimbledon	(Germany) Angelique Kerber	(United States) Serena Williams	6–3	6–3	
2018	US Open (details)	(Japan) Naomi Osaka^{☆}	(United States) Serena Williams	6–2	6–4	
2019	Australian Open	(Japan) Naomi Osaka	(Czech Republic) Petra Kvitová	7–6^{7–2}	5–7	6–4
2019	French Open	(Australia) Ashleigh Barty^{☆}	(Czech Republic) Markéta Vondroušová	6–1	6–3	
2019	Wimbledon	(Romania) Simona Halep	(United States) Serena Williams	6–2	6–2	
2019	US Open	(Canada) Bianca Andreescu^{☆†‡}	(United States) Serena Williams	6–3	7–5	
2020	Australian Open	(United States) Sofia Kenin^{☆‡}	(Spain) Garbiñe Muguruza	4–6	6–2	6–2
2020	US Open	(Japan) Naomi Osaka	(Belarus) Victoria Azarenka	1–6	6–3	6–3
2020	French Open	(Poland) Iga Świątek^{☆}	(United States) Sofia Kenin	6–4	6–1	
2021	Australian Open	(Japan) Naomi Osaka	(United States) Jennifer Brady^{†}	6–4	6–3	
2021	French Open	(Czech Republic) Barbora Krejčíková^{☆}	(Russia) Anastasia Pavlyuchenkova^{†}	6–1	2–6	6–4
2021	Wimbledon	(Australia) Ashleigh Barty	(Czech Republic) Karolína Plíšková	6–3	6–7^{4–7}	6–3
2021	US Open	(United Kingdom) Emma Raducanu^{☆†‡}	(Canada) Leylah Fernandez^{†}	6–4	6–3	
2022	Australian Open	(Australia) Ashleigh Barty	(United States) Danielle Collins^{†}	6–3	7–6^{7–2}	
2022	French Open	(Poland) Iga Świątek	(United States) Coco Gauff	6–1	6–3	
2022	Wimbledon	(Kazakhstan) Elena Rybakina^{☆}	(Tunisia) Ons Jabeur	3–6	6–2	6–2
2022	US Open	(Poland) Iga Świątek	(Tunisia) Ons Jabeur	6–2	7–6^{7–5}	
2023	Australian Open	(Note: On 1 March 2022, the WTA announced that players from Russia and Belarus will not be allowed to compete under the name or flags of Russia or Belarus following the 2022 Russian invasion of Ukraine.) Aryna Sabalenka^{☆}	(Kazakhstan) Elena Rybakina	4–6	6–3	6–4
2023	French Open	(Poland) Iga Świątek	(Czech Republic) Karolína Muchová	6–2	5–7	6–4
2023	Wimbledon	(Czech Republic) Markéta Vondroušová^{☆‡}	(Tunisia) Ons Jabeur	6–4	6–4	
2023	US Open	(United States) Coco Gauff^{☆}	Aryna Sabalenka	2–6	6–3	6–2
2024	Australian Open	Aryna Sabalenka	(China) Zheng Qinwen^{†}	6–3	6–2	
2024	French Open	(Poland) Iga Świątek	(Italy) Jasmine Paolini	6–2	6–1	
2024	Wimbledon	(Czech Republic) Barbora Krejčíková	(Italy) Jasmine Paolini	6–2	2–6	6–4
2024	US Open	Aryna Sabalenka	(United States) Jessica Pegula^{†}	7–5	7–5	
2025	Australian Open	(United States) Madison Keys^{☆‡}	Aryna Sabalenka	6–3	2–6	7–5
2025	French Open	(United States) Coco Gauff	Aryna Sabalenka	6–7^{5–7}	6–2	6–4
2025	Wimbledon	(Poland) Iga Świątek	(United States) Amanda Anisimova	6–0	6–0	
2025	US Open	Aryna Sabalenka	(United States) Amanda Anisimova	6–3	7–6^{7–3}	
2026	Australian Open	(Kazakhstan) Elena Rybakina	Aryna Sabalenka	6–4	4–6	6–4
2026	French Open	Mirra Andreeva^{☆†‡}	(Poland) Maja Chwalińska^{†}	6–3	6–2	
2026	Wimbledon	(Czech Republic) Linda Nosková^{☆†‡}	(Czech Republic) Karolína Muchová	6–2	5–7	6–3
2026	US Open	(Kazakhstan) Elena Rybakina	Aryna Sabalenka	6–4	5–7	6–2

== Records and statistics ==
=== Longest and shortest finals ===
==== Longest by number of games ====
Best of 3 (post-tiebreaker introduction)
1996 French Open: 40 games.
(Germany) Steffi Graf	6	6^{4}	10
(Spain) Arantxa Sánchez Vicario	3	7^{7}	8

Best of 3 (pre-tiebreaker introduction)
1948 U.S. National Championships: 48 games.
(United States) Margaret Osborne duPont	4	6	15
(United States) Louise Brough	6	4	13

Best of 5 (U.S. National Championships 1891–1901)
1898 U.S. National Championships challenge round: 51 games. (Note: However, in 1902, Muriel Robb defeated Charlotte Cooper Sterry 7–5, 6–1 after abandonment of an overnight score of 4–6, 13–11, thus needing a total of 53 games to win the title.)
(United States) Juliette Atkinson	6	5	6	2	7
(United States) Marion Jones	3	7	4	6	5

==== Shortest by number of games ====
1911 Wimbledon Championships: 12 games.
(United Kingdom) Dorothea Douglass Lambert Chambers	6	6
(United Kingdom) Dora Boothby	0	0

1988 French Open: 12 games.
(West Germany) Steffi Graf	6	6
(Soviet Union) Natasha Zvereva	0	0

2025 Wimbledon Championships: 12 games.
(Poland) Iga Świątek	6	6
(United States) Amanda Anisimova	0	0

=== First-timer finals ===
There have been 27 finals contested between first-time finalists (12 in the Open Era):

Tournament	Winner	Runner-up
1884 Wimbledon	(United Kingdom) Maud Watson	(United Kingdom) Lilian Watson
1887 U.S. National	(United States) Ellen Hansell	(United States) Laura Knight
1893 U.S. National	(United States) Aline Terry	(United States) Augusta Schultz
1895 Wimbledon	(United Kingdom) Charlotte Cooper	(United Kingdom) Helen Jackson
1900 U.S. National	(United States) Myrtle McAteer	(United States) Edith Parker
1903 Wimbledon	(United Kingdom) Dorothea Douglass	(United Kingdom) Ethel Thomson
1907 U.S. National	(United States) Evelyn Sears	(United States) Carrie Neely
1912 U.S. National	(United States) Mary Browne	(United States) Eleonora Sears
1922 Australasian	(Australia) Margaret Molesworth	(Australia) Esna Boyd
1927 French	(Netherlands) Kea Bouman	(South Africa) Irene Peacock
1931 Australian	(Australia) Coral McInnes Buttsworth	(Australia) Marjorie Cox Crawford
1938 Australian	(United States) Dorothy Bundy Cheney	(Australia) Dorothy Stevenson
1955 French	(United Kingdom) Angela Mortimer	(United States) Dorothy Head Knode
1960 Australian	(Australia) Margaret Smith	(Australia) Jan Lehane
1962 Wimbledon	(United States) Karen Hantze Susman	(Czechoslovakia) Věra Suková
1977 French Open	(Socialist Federal Republic of Yugoslavia) Mima Jaušovec	(Romania) Florența Mihai
1978 Australian Open	(Australia) Chris O'Neil	(United States) Betsy Nagelsen
1979 Australian Open	(United States) Barbara Jordan	(United States) Sharon Walsh
2004 French Open	(Russia) Anastasia Myskina	(Russia) Elena Dementieva
2010 French Open	(Italy) Francesca Schiavone	(Australia) Samantha Stosur
2015 US Open	(Italy) Flavia Pennetta	(Italy) Roberta Vinci
2017 US Open	(United States) Sloane Stephens	(United States) Madison Keys
2019 French Open	(Australia) Ashleigh Barty	(Czech Republic) Markéta Vondroušová
2021 French Open	(Czech Republic) Barbora Krejčíková	(Russia) Anastasia Pavlyuchenkova
2021 US Open	(United Kingdom) Emma Raducanu	(Canada) Leylah Fernandez
2022 Wimbledon	(Kazakhstan) Elena Rybakina	(Tunisia) Ons Jabeur
2026 French Open	Mirra Andreeva	(Poland) Maja Chwalińska

=== All-countrywomen finals (Open Era) ===
Six countries (Australia, Belgium, Czech Republic, Italy, Russia and the United States) have had two countrywomen meet in a final in the Open Era:

Tournament	Winner	Runner-up
1970 Australian Open	(Australia) Margaret Court	(Australia) Kerry Melville
1971 Australian Open	(Australia) Margaret Court	(Australia) Evonne Goolagong
1971 French Open	(Australia) Evonne Goolagong	(Australia) Helen Gourlay
1971 Wimbledon	(Australia) Evonne Goolagong	(Australia) Margaret Court
1971 US Open	(United States) Billie Jean King	(United States) Rosemary Casals
1973 Australian Open	(Australia) Margaret Court	(Australia) Evonne Goolagong
1973 Wimbledon	(United States) Billie Jean King	(United States) Chris Evert
1973 US Open	(Australia) Margaret Court	(Australia) Evonne Goolagong
1977 Australian Open (Jan)	(Australia) Kerry Melville	(Australia) Dianne Fromholtz
1977 Australian Open (Dec)	(Australia) Evonne Goolagong	(Australia) Helen Gourlay
1978 Wimbledon	(United States) Martina Navratilova	(United States) Chris Evert (Note: Evert defeated Navratilova in their first Grand Slam final meeting at the 1975 French Open when Navratilova was competing for Czechoslovakia.)
1978 US Open	(United States) Chris Evert	(United States) Pam Shriver
1979 Wimbledon	(United States) Martina Navratilova	(United States) Chris Evert Lloyd
1979 US Open	(United States) Tracy Austin	(United States) Chris Evert Lloyd
1979 Australian Open	(United States) Barbara Jordan	(United States) Sharon Walsh
1981 US Open	(United States) Tracy Austin	(United States) Martina Navratilova
1981 Australian Open	(United States) Martina Navratilova	(United States) Chris Evert Lloyd
1982 French Open	(United States) Martina Navratilova	(United States) Andrea Jaeger
1982 Wimbledon	(United States) Martina Navratilova	(United States) Chris Evert Lloyd
1982 Australian Open	(United States) Chris Evert Lloyd	(United States) Martina Navratilova
1983 Wimbledon	(United States) Martina Navratilova	(United States) Andrea Jaeger
1983 US Open	(United States) Martina Navratilova	(United States) Chris Evert Lloyd
1984 French Open	(United States) Martina Navratilova	(United States) Chris Evert Lloyd
1984 Wimbledon	(United States) Martina Navratilova	(United States) Chris Evert Lloyd
1984 US Open	(United States) Martina Navratilova	(United States) Chris Evert Lloyd
1985 French Open	(United States) Chris Evert Lloyd	(United States) Martina Navratilova
1985 Wimbledon	(United States) Martina Navratilova	(United States) Chris Evert Lloyd
1985 Australian Open	(United States) Martina Navratilova	(United States) Chris Evert Lloyd
1986 French Open	(United States) Chris Evert Lloyd	(United States) Martina Navratilova
1990 Wimbledon	(United States) Martina Navratilova	(United States) Zina Garrison
2000 Wimbledon	(United States) Venus Williams	(United States) Lindsay Davenport
2000 US Open	(United States) Venus Williams	(United States) Lindsay Davenport
2001 US Open	(United States) Venus Williams	(United States) Serena Williams
2002 French Open	(United States) Serena Williams	(United States) Venus Williams
2002 Wimbledon	(United States) Serena Williams	(United States) Venus Williams
2002 US Open	(United States) Serena Williams	(United States) Venus Williams
2003 Australian Open	(United States) Serena Williams	(United States) Venus Williams
2003 French Open	(Belgium) Justine Henin-Hardenne	(Belgium) Kim Clijsters
2003 Wimbledon	(United States) Serena Williams	(United States) Venus Williams
2003 US Open	(Belgium) Justine Henin-Hardenne	(Belgium) Kim Clijsters
2004 Australian Open	(Belgium) Justine Henin-Hardenne	(Belgium) Kim Clijsters
2004 French Open	(Russia) Anastasia Myskina	(Russia) Elena Dementieva
2004 US Open	(Russia) Svetlana Kuznetsova	(Russia) Elena Dementieva
2005 Australian Open	(United States) Serena Williams	(United States) Lindsay Davenport
2005 Wimbledon	(United States) Venus Williams	(United States) Lindsay Davenport
2008 Wimbledon	(United States) Venus Williams	(United States) Serena Williams
2009 French Open	(Russia) Svetlana Kuznetsova	(Russia) Dinara Safina
2009 Wimbledon	(United States) Serena Williams	(United States) Venus Williams
2015 US Open	(Italy) Flavia Pennetta	(Italy) Roberta Vinci
2017 Australian Open	(United States) Serena Williams	(United States) Venus Williams
2017 US Open	(United States) Sloane Stephens	(United States) Madison Keys
2026 Wimbledon	(Czech Republic) Linda Nosková	(Czech Republic) Karolína Muchová

== See also ==
- List of Grand Slam women's singles champions
- List of Grand Slam men's singles finals
