= Chronological list of women's Grand Slam tennis champions =

Following is a list of female tennis players who have won at least one of the four Grand Slam titles in singles. They are listed here in order of their first win. Players in bold are still active.

Key	Player completed a Grand Slam (event in bold)
Key	Player completed a non-calendar year Grand Slam (event in bold)
Key	Player completed a career Grand Slam (event in bold)

#	Champion	Year	First major	Majors	Australian Open	French Open	Wimbledon	US Open
1	(United Kingdom) Maud Watson	1884	Wimbledon	2			1884, 1885	
2	(United Kingdom) Blanche Bingley Hillyard	1886	Wimbledon	6			1886, 1889, 1894, 1897, 1899, 1900	
3	(United Kingdom) Lottie Dod	1887	Wimbledon	5			1887, 1888, 1891, 1892, 1893	
4	(United States) Ellen Hansell	1887	U.S. National Championships	1				1887
5	(United States) Bertha Townsend	1888	U.S. National Championships	2				1888, 1889
6	(United Kingdom) Helena Rice	1889	Wimbledon	1			1890	
7	(United States) Ellen Roosevelt	1890	U.S. National Championships	1				1890
8	(United Kingdom) Mabel Cahill	1891	U.S. National Championships	2				1891, 1892
9	(United States) Aline Terry	1893	U.S. National Championships	1				1893
10	(United States) Helen Hellwig	1894	U.S. National Championships	1				1894
11	(United Kingdom) Charlotte Cooper Sterry	1895	Wimbledon	5			1895, 1896, 1898, 1901, 1908	
12	(United States) Juliette Atkinson	1895	U.S. National Championships	3				1895, 1897, 1898
13	(United States) Elisabeth Moore	1896	U.S. National Championships	4				1896, 1901, 1903, 1905
14	(United States) Marion Jones	1899	U.S. National Championships	2				1899, 1902
15	(United States) Myrtle McAteer	1900	U.S. National Championships	1				1900
16	(United Kingdom) Muriel Robb	1902	Wimbledon	1			1902	
17	(United States) May Sutton	1904	U.S. National Championships	3			1905, 1907	1904
18	(United Kingdom) Dorothea Lambert Chambers	1903	Wimbledon	7			1903, 1904, 1906, 1910, 1911, 1913, 1914	
19	(United States) Helen Homans	1906	U.S. National Championships	1				1906
20	(United States) Evelyn Sears	1907	U.S. National Championships	1				1907
21	(United States) Maud Barger	1908	U.S. National Championships	1				1908
22	(United Kingdom) Dora Boothby	1909	Wimbledon	1			1909	
23	(United States) Hazel Hotchkiss Wightman	1909	U.S. National Championships	4				1909, 1910, 1911, 1919
24	(United Kingdom) Ethel Thomson	1912	Wimbledon	1			1912	
25	(United States) Mary Browne	1912	U.S. National Championships	3				1912, 1913, 1914
26	(Norway) / (United States) Molla Bjurstedt Mallory	1915	U.S. National Championships	8				1915, 1916, 1917, 1918, 1920, 1921, 1922, 1926
27	(France) Suzanne Lenglen	1919	Wimbledon	8		1925, 1926	1919, 1920, 1921, 1922, 1923, 1925	
28	(Australia) Margaret Molesworth	1922	Australasian Championships	2	1922, 1923			
29	(United States) Helen Wills Moody	1923	U.S. National Championships	19		1928, 1929, 1930, 1932	1927, 1928, 1929, 1930, 1932, 1933, 1935, 1938	1923, 1924, 1925, 1927, 1928, 1929, 1931
30	(Australia) Sylvia Lance	1924	Australasian Championships	1				
31	(United Kingdom) Kathleen McKane	1924	Wimbledon	2			1924, 1926	
32	(Australia) Daphne Akhurst Cozens	1925	Australasian Championships	5	1925, 1926, 1928, 1929, 1930			
33	(Australia) Esna Boyd	1927	Australian Championships	1				
34	(Netherlands) Kea Bouman	1927	French Championships	1		1927		
35	(United Kingdom) Betty Nuthall Shoemaker	1930	U.S. National Championships	1				1930
36	(Australia) Coral Buttsworth	1931	Australian Championships	2	1931, 1932			
37	(Germany) Cilly Aussem	1931	French Championships	2		1931	1931	
38	(United States) Helen Jacobs	1932	U.S. National Championships	5			1936	1932, 1933, 1934, 1935
39	(Australia) Joan Hartigan	1933	Australian Championships	3	1933, 1934, 1936			
40	(United Kingdom) Margaret Scriven	1933	French Championships	2		1933, 1934		
41	(United Kingdom) Dorothy Round Little	1934	Wimbledon	3	1935		1934, 1937	
42	(Germany) Hilde Krahwinkel Sperling	1935	French Championships	3		1935, 1936, 1937		
43	(United States) Alice Marble	1936	U.S. National Championships	5			1939	1936, 1938, 1939, 1940
44	(Australia) Nancye Wynne Bolton	1937	Australian Championships	6	1937, 1940, 1946, 1947, 1948, 1951			
45	(Chile) Anita Lizana	1937	U.S. National Championships	1				1937
46	(United States) Dorothy Bundy Cheney	1938	Australian Championships	1	1938			
47	(France) Simonne Mathieu	1938	French Championships	2		1938, 1939		
48	(Australia) Emily Hood Westacott	1939	Australian Championships	1	1939			
49	(United States) Sarah Palfrey	1941	U.S. National Championships	2				1941, 1945
50	(United States) Pauline Betz Addie	1942	U.S. National Championships	5			1946	1942, 1943, 1944, 1946
51	(United States) Margaret Osborne duPont	1946	French Championships	6		1946, 1949	1947	1948, 1949, 1950
52	(United States) Patricia Canning Todd	1947	French Championships	1		1947		
53	(United States) Louise Brough Clapp	1947	U.S. National Championships	6	1950		1948, 1949, 1950, 1955	1947
54	(France) Nelly Adamson Landry	1948	French Championships	1		1948		
55	(United States) Doris Hart	1949	Australian Championships	6	1949	1950, 1952	1951	**1954**, 1955
56	(United States) Shirley Fry Irvin	1951	French Championships	4	**1957**	1951	1956	1956
57	(United States) Maureen Connolly Brinker	1951	U.S. National Championships	9	1953	1953, 1954	1952, 1953, 1954	1951, 1952, **1953**
58	(Australia) Thelma Coyne Long	1952	Australian Championships	2	1952, 1954			
59	(Australia) Beryl Penrose Collier	1956	Australian Championships	1	1955			
60	(United Kingdom) Angela Mortimer Barrett	1955	French Championships	3	1958	1955	1961	
61	(Australia) Mary Carter Reitano	1956	Australian Championships	2	1956, 1959			
62	(United States) Althea Gibson	1956	French Championships	5		1956	1957, 1958	1957, 1958
63	(United Kingdom) Shirley Bloomer Brasher	1957	French Championships	1		1957		
64	(Hungary) Zsuzsi Körmöczy	1958	French Championships	1		1958		
65	(United Kingdom) Christine Truman Janes	1959	French Championships	1		1959		
66	(Brazil) Maria Bueno	1959	Wimbledon	7			1959, 1960, 1964	1959, 1963, 1964, 1966
67	(Australia) Margaret Court	1960	Australian Championships	**24**	1960, 1961, 1962, 1963, 1964, 1965, 1966, 1969, 1970, 1971, 1973	1962, 1964, 1969, 1970, 1973	1963, 1965, 1970	1962, 1965, 1969, **1970**, 1973
68	(United States) Darlene Hard	1960	French Championships	3		1960		1960, 1961
69	(United Kingdom) Ann Haydon	1961	French Championships	3		1961, 1966	1969	
70	(United States) Karen Hantze Susman	1962	Wimbledon	1			1962	
71	(Australia) Lesley Turner Bowrey	1963	French Championships	2		1963, 1965		
72	(United States) Billie Jean King	1966	Wimbledon	12	1968	**1972**	1966, 1967, 1968, 1972, 1973, 1975	1967, 1971, 1972, 1974
73	(United States) Nancy Richey	1967	Australian Championships	2	1967	1968		
74	(France) Françoise Dürr	1967	French Championships	1		1967		
75	(United Kingdom) Virginia Wade	1968	US Open	3	1972		1977	1968
76	(Australia) Evonne Goolagong Cawley	1971	French Open	7	1974, 1975, 1976, 1977^{Dec}	1971	1971, 1980	
77	(United States) Chris Evert	1974	French Open	18	**1982**, 1984	1974, 1975, 1979, 1980, 1983, 1985, 1986	1974, 1976, 1981	1975, 1976, 1977, 1978, 1980, 1982
78	(United Kingdom) Sue Barker	1976	French Open	1		1976		
79	(Australia) Kerry Melville Reid	1977	Australian Open	1	1977^{Jan}			
80	(Socialist Federal Republic of Yugoslavia) Mima Jaušovec	1977	French Open	1		1977		
81	(Australia) Chris O'Neil	1978	Australian Open	1	1978			
82	(Romania) Virginia Ruzici	1978	French Open	1		1978		
83	(United States) Martina Navratilova	1978	Wimbledon	18	1981, 1983, 1985	1982, 1984	1978, 1979, 1982, 1983, 1984, 1985, 1986, 1987, 1990	1983, **1984**, 1986, 1987
84	(United States) Barbara Jordan	1979	Australian Open	1	1979			
85	(United States) Tracy Austin	1979	US Open	2				1979, 1981
86	(Czech Republic) Hana Mandlíková	1980	Australian Open	4	1980, 1987	1981		1985
87	(Germany) Steffi Graf	1987	French Open	22	1988, 1989, 1990, 1994	1987, 1988, 1993, 1995, 1996, 1999	1988, 1989, 1991, 1992, 1993, 1995, 1996	**1988**, 1989, 1993, 1995, 1996
88	(Spain) Arantxa Sánchez Vicario	1989	French Open	4		1989, 1994, 1998		1994
89	(Socialist Federal Republic of Yugoslavia) / (Federal Republic of Yugoslavia) / (United States) Monica Seles	1990	French Open	9	1991, 1992, 1993, 1996	1990, 1991, 1992		1991, 1992
90	(Argentina) Gabriela Sabatini	1990	US Open	1				1990
91	(Spain) Conchita Martínez	1994	Wimbledon	1			1994	
92	(France) Mary Pierce	1995	Australian Open	2	1995	2000		
93	(Switzerland) Martina Hingis	1997	Australian Open	5	1997, 1998, 1999		1997	1997
94	(Croatia) Iva Majoli	1997	French Open	1		1997		
95	(Czech Republic) Jana Novotná	1998	Wimbledon	1			1998	
96	(United States) Lindsay Davenport	1998	US Open	3	2000		1999	1998
97	(United States) Serena Williams	1999	US Open	23	**2003**, 2005, 2007, 2009, 2010, 2015, 2017	2002, 2013, 2015	2002, 2003, 2009, 2010, 2012, **2015**, 2016	1999, 2002, 2008, 2012, 2013, 2014
98	(United States) **Venus Williams**	2000	Wimbledon	7			2000, 2001, 2005, 2007, 2008	2000, 2001
99	(United States) Jennifer Capriati	2001	Australian Open	3	2001, 2002	2001		
100	(Belgium) Justine Henin	2003	French Open	7	2004	2003, 2005, 2006, 2007		2003, 2007
101	(Russia) Anastasia Myskina	2004	French Open	1		2004		
102	(Russia) Maria Sharapova	2004	Wimbledon	5	2008	**2012**, 2014	2004	2006
103	(Russia) Svetlana Kuznetsova	2004	US Open	2		2009		2004
104	(Belgium) Kim Clijsters	2005	US Open	4	2011			2005, 2009, 2010
105	(France) Amélie Mauresmo	2006	Australian Open	2	2006		2006	
106	(Serbia) Ana Ivanovic	2008	French Open	1		2008		
107	(Italy) Francesca Schiavone	2010	French Open	1		2010		
108	(China) Li Na	2011	French Open	2	2014	2011		
109	(Czech Republic) Petra Kvitová	2011	Wimbledon	2			2011, 2014	
110	(Australia) Samantha Stosur	2011	US Open	1				2011
111	(Belarus) **Victoria Azarenka**	2012	Australian Open	2	2012, 2013			
112	(France) Marion Bartoli	2013	Wimbledon	1			2013	
113	(Italy) Flavia Pennetta	2015	US Open	1				2015
114	(Germany) Angelique Kerber	2016	Australian Open	3	2016		2018	2016
115	(Spain) Garbiñe Muguruza	2016	French Open	2		2016	2017	
116	(Latvia) **Jeļena Ostapenko**	2017	French Open	1		2017		
117	(United States) **Sloane Stephens**	2017	US Open	1				2017
118	(Denmark) Caroline Wozniacki	2018	Australian Open	1	2018			
119	(Romania) Simona Halep	2018	French Open	2		2018	2019	
120	(Japan) **Naomi Osaka**	2018	US Open	4	2019, 2021			2018, 2020
121	(Australia) Ashleigh Barty	2019	French Open	3	2022	2019	2021	
122	(Canada) **Bianca Andreescu**	2019	US Open	1				2019
123	(United States) **Sofia Kenin**	2020	Australian Open	1	2020			
124	(Poland) **Iga Świątek**	2020	French Open	6		2020, 2022, 2023, 2024	2025	2022
125	(Czech Republic) **Barbora Krejčíková**	2021	French Open	2		2021	2024	
126	(United Kingdom) **Emma Raducanu**	2021	US Open	1				2021
127	(Kazakhstan) **Elena Rybakina**	2022	Wimbledon	3	2026		2022	2026
128	**Aryna Sabalenka**	2023	Australian Open	4	2023, 2024			2024, 2025
129	(Czech Republic) **Markéta Vondroušová**	2023	Wimbledon	1			2023	
130	(United States) **Coco Gauff**	2023	US Open	2		2025		2023
131	(United States) **Madison Keys**	2025	Australian Open	1	2025			
132	**Mirra Andreeva**	2026	French Open	1		2026		
133	(Czech Republic) **Linda Nosková**	2026	Wimbledon	1			2026	
Players	Events			Majors	Australian Open	French Open	Wimbledon	US Open
133	Totals			467	100	96	132	139

== See also ==
- List of Grand Slam women's singles champions
- Chronological list of men's Grand Slam tennis champions
- List of Grand Slam women's singles finals
- List of WTA Tour top-level tournament singles champions
