= List of Grand Slam singles finals =

The following are lists of Grand Slam singles finals in tennis:

- List of Grand Slam men's singles finals
- List of Grand Slam women's singles finals
