= 1908 U.S. National Championships (tennis) =

- Date: August 18–29 (M); June 22–27 (W)
- Edition: 28th
- Category: Grand Slam
- Surface: Grass
- Location: Newport, R.I., United States (M); Philadelphia, PA, United States (W)

Champions

Men's singles
- (United States) William Larned

Women's singles
- (United States) Maud Barger-Wallach

Men's doubles
- (United States) Fred Alexander / (United States) Harold Hackett

Women's doubles
- (United States) Evelyn Sears / (United States) Margaret Curtis

Mixed doubles
- (United States) Edith Rotch / (United States) Nathaniel Niles
- U.S. National Championships

The 1908 U.S. National Championships (now known as the US Open) was a tennis tournament that took place in June and August of 1908.

The women's tournament was held from June 22 to June 27 on the outdoor grass courts at the Philadelphia Cricket Club in Philadelphia, Pennsylvania. The men's tournament was held from August 18 to August 29 on the outdoor grass courts at the Newport Casino in Newport, Rhode Island. It was the 28th U.S. National Championships and the second Grand Slam tournament of the three played that year.

== Finals ==
=== Men's singles ===
(United States) William Larned (USA) defeated (United States) Beals Wright (USA) 6–1, 6–2, 8–6

=== Women's singles ===
(United States) Maud Barger-Wallach (USA) defeated (United States) Evelyn Sears (USA) 6–3, 1–6, 6–3

=== Men's doubles ===
(United States) Fred Alexander (USA) / (United States) Harold Hackett (USA) defeated (United States) Raymond Little (USA) / (United States) Beals Wright (USA) 6–1, 7–5, 6–2

=== Women's doubles ===
(United States) Evelyn Sears (USA) / (United States) Margaret Curtis (USA) defeated (United States) Carrie Neely (USA) / (United States) Miriam Steever (USA) 6–3, 5–7, 9–7

=== Mixed doubles ===
(United States) Edith Rotch (USA) / (United States) Nathaniel Niles (USA) defeated (United States) Louise Hammond Raymond (USA) / (United States) Raymond Little (USA) 6–4, 4–6, 6–4

Preceded by 1908 Wimbledon Championships	Grand Slams	Succeeded by 1908 Australasian Championships
