= Western Championships =

Western States Championships Western Sectional Championships Western Championships

Defunct tennis tournament
- Tour: USTA Circuit (1887–1922); ILTF Circuit (1923–1969); ILTF Grand Prix Circuit (1970–78)
- Founded: 1887; 139 years ago
- Abolished: 1978; 48 years ago
- Location: Various
- Surface: Clay/Grass/Hard

The Western Championships also known as the Western States Championships or Western Sectional Championships was a men's and women's open tennis tournament staged annually at various locations from 1887 until 1978.

== History ==
On July 4, 1887, the first Championships of the Western States were inaugurated at the Scarlett Ribbon Club in Chicago, Illinois, United States, and the first men's champion was Charles Amherst Chase. In 1895 a women's championship event was added to the schedule which was won by Marion Capwell.

In 1973 the final ladies championship was held that was won by the Australian player Evonne Goolagong. The men's tournament continued to play until 1978 which was won by the American player Eddie Dibbs.

The championships were part of the USLTA Circuit from 1887 until 1923. It became of part of the ILTF Circuit following the United States joining the International Lawn Tennis Federation in 1925 until 1969 In 1970 the tournament became part of the ILTF Grand Prix Circuit. In 1955 and from 1969 until 1973 the women's event was also valid as the Tri-State Championships.

== Locations ==
The championships have been played in the following cities; Chicago, Cincinnati, Harbor Springs, Indianapolis, Kansas City, Lake Forest, Minnetonka, Neenah, River Forest and Sharonville.

== Finals ==
=== Men's singles ===
(incomplete roll)

Year	Location	Champion	Runner up	Score
Western States Championships
↓ USNLTA Circuit ↓
1887	Chicago	(United States) Charles A. Chase	(United States) B.F. Cummins	7-5, 6-3, 6-4
1888	Chicago	(United States) Charles A. Chase (2)	(United States) E.W. McClellan	6-4, 6-2, 6-1
1889	Chicago	(United States) Charles A. Chase (3)	(United States) Samuel T. Chase	6-4, 6-4, 6-3
1890	Chicago	(United States) Charles A. Chase (4)	(United States) John Ryerson	6-3, 6-3, 5-7, 6-4
1891	Chicago	(United States) Samuel T. Chase	(United States) B.F. Cummins	3-6, 6-2, 6-3, 6-2
1892	Chicago	(United States) Samuel T. Chase (2)	(United States) John Ryerson	6-4, 6-3, 6-2
1893	Evanston	(United States) Samuel T. Chase (3)	(United States) Evarts Wrenn	6-3, 6-0, 6-4
1897	Chicago	(United States) Kreigh Collins	(United States) Carr Neel	6-3, 7-5, 7-9, 9-7
1899	Chicago	(United States) Carr Neel	(United States) Kreigh Collins	6-4, 6-3, 6-3
1900	Chicago	(United States) Kreigh Collins (2)	(United States) Carr Neel	w.o.
1907	Lake Forest	(United States) Nat Emerson	(United States) Harry Waidner	6-4, 2-6, 6-1, 6-3
1908	Chicago	(United States) Nat Emerson (2)	(United States) Harry Waidner	8-10, 6-0, 3-6, 6-1, 7-5
Western Championships
1919	Kansas City	(United States) Willis E. Davis)	(United States) Ralph Burdick	10-8, 4-6, 6-3, 2-6, 6-2
1921	Indianapolis	(United States) Vinnie Richards	(United States) Walter T. Hayes	6-1, 6-4, 6-2
1922	Chicago	(United States) John F. Hennessey	(United States) Walter Wesbrook	6-3, 5-7, 6-1, 11-9
↓ ILTF Circuit ↓
1923	Chicago	(United States) Walter Wesbrook	(United States) George Lott	?
1924	Indianapolis	(United States) Bill Tilden II	(United States) John F. Hennessey	6-2, 6-1, 6-2
1925	Detroit	(United States) Harvey Snodgrass	(United States) Walter Wesbrook	3-6, 8-6, 7-5, 8-6
1926	Indianapolis	(United States) Alfred H. Chapin	(South Africa) Brian Norton	6-4, 5-7, 6-3, 2-6, 6-1
1927	Dayton	(United States) George Lott	(United States) John F. Hennessey	7-5, 7-5, 6-4
1928	Chicago	(United States) Emmett Pare	(Taiwan) Stanley Gordon Lum	6-4, 4-6, 6-3, 6-3
1929	Skokie	(United States) Keith Gledhill	(United States) Ellsworth Vines	12-10, 0-6, 6-2, 5-7, 6-1
1930	Chicago	(United States) Harris Coggeshall	(United States) Clifford Sutter	2-2 sets retd.
1931	Chicago	(United States) Harris Coggeshall (2)	(Canada) Marcel Rainville	?
1932	River Forest	(United States) Frank Parker	(United States) Lester Stoefen	2-6, 7-5, 6-4, 6-2
1933	Chicago	(United States) George Lott (2)	(United States) Frank Parker	0-6, 7-5, 6-1, 3-6, 6-2
1934	River Forest	(United States) Bryan Grant	(United States) John McDiarmid	6-1, 6-3, 6-3
1935	Chicago	(United States) Wilbur Coen	(United States) John McDiarmid	6-4, 6-2, 6-2
1936	Harbor Springs	(United States) Ernie Sutter	(United States) Julius Heldman	6-4, 6-0, 6-3
1937	Harbor Springs	(United States) Walter Senior	(United States) William Murphy	6-4, 6-2, 10-8
1939	Chicago	(United States) William Murphy	(United States) Jack Tidball	6-8, 6-1, 6-1, 9-7
1940	Indianapolis	(United States) Bobby Riggs	(United States) Welby Van Horn	6-3, 6-1, 6-2
1941	Indianapolis	(United States) Bobby Riggs (2)	(United States) Don McNeill	7-5, 3-6, 10-8, 6-4
1942	Chicago	(United States) Seymour Greenberg	(United States) Jimmy Evert	7-5, 6-0, 6-2
1944	Neenah	(Ecuador) Pancho Segura	(United States) Bill Talbert	3-6, 6-1 4-6, 6-3, 11-9
1945	Neenah	(United States) Bill Talbert	(United States) Elwood Cooke	6-2, 6-8, 7-5
1946	Indianapolis	(United States) Bill Talbert (2)	(United States) Seymour Greenberg	6-2, 6-2, 4-6, 7-5
1947	Chicago	(United States) Gardner Larned	(United States) Seymour Greenberg	6-2, 6-2, 4-6, 7-5
1948	Indianapolis	(United States) Pancho Gonzales	(United States) Jack Tuero	6-3, 6-1, 6-3
1949	Chicago	(United States) James Brink	(United States) Herbert (Buddy) Behrens	7-5, 6-4, 6-3
1950	Indianapolis	(United States) Herb Flam	(United States) Tony Trabert	6-3, 6-3, 6-4
1951	Chicago	(United States) Bernard Bartzen	(United States) Seymour Greenberg	6-3, 6-1
1952	Indianapolis	(United States) Art Larsen	(United States) Dick Savitt	6-2, 1-6, 8-6, 6-4
1953	Milwaukee	(United States) Noel Brown	(Australia) George Worthington	6-3, 6-1, 7-5
1954	Indianapolis	(United States) Vic Seixas	(United States) Ham Richardson	7-5, 3-6, 2-6, 6-2, 6-1
1955	Cincinnati	(United States) Bernard Bartzen (2)	(United States) Tony Trabert	7-9, 11-9, 6-4
1956	Indianapolis	(United States) Vic Seixas	(United States) Edward Moylan	6-4, 6-,3 4-6, 6-2
1957	Milwaukee	(United States) Vic Seixas (2)	(United States) Bernard Bartzen	7-5, 6-2, 6-2
1958	Indianapolis	(Peru) Alex Olmedo	(United States) Bernard Bartzen	1-6, 8-6, 6-0
1959	Milwaukee	(United States) Bernard Bartzen (3)	(Australia) Warren Woodcock	6-1, 6-2, 3-6, 6-2
1960	Indianapolis	(United States) Whitney Reed	(United Kingdom) Reg Bennett	6-2, 6-4, 6-3
1961	Milwaukee	(United States) Donald Dell	(United States) Marty Riessen	2-6, 7-9, 6-0, 6-0, 6-3
1962	Indianapolis	(Puerto Rico) Charlie Pasarell	(United States) Marty Riessen	2-6, 3-6, 6-4, 6-1, 6-2
1963	Milwaukee	(United States) Billy Lenoir	(United States) Marty Riessen	8-10, 2-6, 6-0, 6-1, 6-2
1964	Indianapolis	(United States) Dennis Ralston	(United States) Marty Riessen	6-4, 6-1, 6-1
1965	Milwaukee	(United States) Cliff Richey	(United States) Marty Riessen	5-7, 6-4, 6-3, 6-3
1966	Indianapolis	(United States) Cliff Richey (2)	(United States) Dennis Ralston	6-1, 1-6, 6-1, 6-2
1967	Indianapolis	(Canada) Mike Belkin	(Ecuador) Pancho Guzmán	3-6, 6-3, 6-1, 6-2
1968	Indianapolis	(Chile) Jaime Fillol	(United States) Cliff Richey	6-1, 7-5, 6-2
↓ Open era ↓
1969	Cincinnati	(United States) Cliff Richey (3)	(Australia) Allan Stone	6–1, 6–2.
↓ Grand Prix circuit ↓
1970	Cincinnati	(Australia) Ken Rosewall	(United States) Cliff Richey	7–9, 9–7, 8–6
1971	Cincinnati	(United States) Stan Smith	(Spain) Juan Gisbert, Sr.	7–6, 6–3
1972	Cincinnati	(United States) Jimmy Connors	(Argentina) Guillermo Vilas	6–3, 6–3
1973	Cincinnati	(Romania) Ilie Năstase	(Spain) Manuel Orantes	5–7, 6–3, 6–4
1974	Cincinnati	(United States) Marty Riessen	(United States) Robert Lutz	7–6^{(8–6)}, 7–6^{(7–5)}
1975	Cincinnati	(United States) Tom Gorman	(United States) Sherwood Stewart	7–5, 2–6, 6–4
1976	Cincinnati	(United States) Roscoe Tanner	(United States) Eddie Dibbs	7–6, 6–3
1977	Cincinnati	(United States) Harold Solomon	(United Kingdom) Mark Cox	6–2, 6–3
1979	Cincinnati	(United States) Eddie Dibbs	(Mexico) Raúl Ramírez	5–7, 6–3, 6–2

=== Women' singles ===
(incomplete roll)

Year	Location	Champion	Runner up	Score
Western States Championships
↓ USNLTA Circuit ↓
1895	Chicago	(United States) Marion Capwell	(United States) Carrie Neely	6-2, 6-2, 3-6, 4-6, 7-5
1896	Chicago	(United States) Jennie Craven	(United States) Carrie Neely	8-6, 6-3, 6-0
1897	Chicago	(United States) Louise Pound	(United States) Jennie Craven	6-0, 6-3, 7-5
1898	Chicago	(United States) Juliette Atkinson	(United States) Louise Pound	6-4, 6-3, 7-5
1899	Chicago	(United States) Juliette Atkinson (2)	(United States) Myrtle McAteer	5-7, 10-8, 6-4, 6-2
1900	Chicago	(United States) Myrtle McAteer	(United States) Maud Banks	6-3, 6-4, 5-7, 6-2
1901	Chicago	(United States) Myrtle McAteer (2)	(United States) Winona Closterman	6-2, 6-1, 6-1
1902	Chicago	(United States) Myrtle McAteer (3)	(United States) Carrie Neely	9-7, 4-6, 6-0
1903	Chicago	(United States) Myrtle McAteer (4)	(United States) Winona Closterman	8-6, 6-1
1904	Chicago	(United States) May Sutton	(United States) Marie Wimer	6-2, 6-1
1905	Chicago	(United States) Myrtle McAteer (5)	(United States) Carrie Neely	6-4, 6-2
1906	Chicago	(United States) Winona Closterman Neff	(United States) Miriam Steever	5-7, 6-4, 6-2
1907	Lake Forest	(United States) Carrie Neely	(United States) Louise Riddell Williams	7-5, 6-4
1908	Chicago	(United States) Carrie Neely (2)	(United States) Miriam Steever	3-6, 6-4, 6-2
1909	Lake Forest	(United States) Carrie Neely (3)	(United States) Alice Day Beard	6-1, 7-5
1910	Lake Forest	(United States) Gwendolyn Rees	(United States) Carrie Neely	5-7, 6-2, 7-5
1911	Lake Forest	(United States) Hazel Hotchkiss	(United States) Carrie Neely	6-1, 6-1
1912	Lake Forest	(United States) May Sutton (2)	(United States) Mary Browne	6-0, 6-3
1913	Lake Forest	(United States) Gwendolyn Rees (2)	(United States) Carrie Neely	6-2, 6-4
1914	Lake Forest	(United States) Mary Browne	(United States) Louise Riddell Williams	6-4, 6-3
1915	Lake Forest	(United States) Carrie Neely (4)	(United States) Louise Pound	6-3, 6-4
1916	Lake Forest	(United States) Marguerite Davis	(United States) Carrie Neely	6-3, 6-3
1917	Chicago	(United States) Carrie Neely (5)	(United States) Mary K. Voorhees	6-0, 6-3
1918	Chicago	(United States) Carrie Neely (6)	(United States) Ethel Billings Northup	6-3, 6-4
Western Championships
1919	Kansas City	(United States) Corinne Gould	(United States) Marguerite Davis	4-6, 6-0, 6-1
1920	Cincinnati	(United States) Roberta Esch	(United States) Mildred Rask	8-6, 4-6 6-3
1921	Indianapolis	(United States) Mrs H.S. Adams	(United States) Ruth Wise	6-2, 6-3
1922	Chicago	(United States) Marion Leighton	(United States) Jessie Grieve	6-1, 6-1
↓ ILTF Circuit ↓
1923	Chicago	(United States) Ruth Smith Riese	(United States) Marion Leighton	6-1, 7-5
1924	Indianapolis	(United States) Marion Leighton (2)	(United States) Lillian Litt Alter	6-2, 6-4
1925	Detroit	(United States) Mrs J. Johnston	(United States) Marion Leighton	5-7, 7-5, 7-5
1926	Indianapolis	(United States) Charlotte Hosmer Chapin	(United States) Marion Leighton	6-2, 7-5
1927	Dayton	(United States) Marion Leighton (3)	(United States) Clara Zinke	2-6, 7-5, 6-4
1928	Dayton	(United States) Marjorie Gladman	(United States) Ruth Smith Riese	6-1, 6-3
1929	Glencoe	(United States) Ruth Bailey	(United States) Clara Zinke	6-2, 6-3
1930	Chicago	(United States) Catherine Wolf	(United States) Clara Zinke	3-6, 6-4, 6-1
1931	Chicago	(United States) Catherine Wolf (2)	(United States) Mae Ceurvorst	1-6, 6-0, 6-2
1932	River Forest	(United States) Dorothy Weisel Hack	(United States) Catherine Wolf	6-4, 4-6, 11-9
1933	Chicago	(United States) Catherine Wolf (3)	(United States) Helen Fulton	6-3, 6-3
1934	River Forest	(United States) Gracyn Wheeler	(United States) Esther Hare Bartosh	6-3, 6-1
1935	Chicago	(United States) Catherine Wolf (4)	(United States) Eunice Dean	6-0, 6-3
1936	Harbor Springs	(United States) Catherine Wolf (5)	(United States) Elizabeth Kesting	6-4, 6-4
1937	Harbor Springs	(United States) Catherine Wolf (6)	(United States) Elizabeth Kesting	7-5, 4-6, 6-4
1939	Chicago	(United States) Virginia Wolfenden	(United States) Patricia Canning	5-7, 6-1, 6-1
1940	Indianapolis	(United States) Alice Marble	(United States) Virginia Wolfenden	6-2, 8-6
1941	Indianapolis	(United States) Pauline Betz	(United States) Dorothy Bundy	9-7, 4-6, 6-3
1942	Chicago	(United States) Catherine Wolf (7)	(United States) Baba Lewis	6-3, 6-4
1944	Neenah	(United States) Pauline Betz (2)	(United States) Dorothy Bundy	6-1, 6-2
1945	Neenah	(United States) Doris Hart	(United States) Mary Arnold	6-3, 8-6
1946	Indianapolis	(United States) Mary Arnold Prentiss	(United States) Shirley Fry	3-6, 6-1, 6-3
1947	Chicago	(United States) Lucille Davidson	(United States) Doris Popple	6-4, 1-6, 6-4
1948	Indianapolis	(United States) Dorothy Head	(United States) Baba Lewis	6-3, 6-3
1949	Chicago	(Romania) Magda Rurac	(United States) Beverly Baker	2-6, 6-3, 7-5
1950	Indianapolis	(United States) Beverly Baker	(Mexico) Melita Ramirez	6-1, 6-2
1951	Chicago	(United States) Toby Greenberg	(United States) Jeanne Arth	6-1, 3-6, 6-3
1952	Indianapolis	(United States) Anita Kanter	(United States) Karol Fageros	7-5, 6-4
1953	Milwaukee	(Australia) Thelma Coyne Long	(United States) Althea Gibson	7-5, 6-3
1954	Indianapolis	(United States) Lois Felix	(United States) Ethel Norton	6-3, 3-6, 6-2
1955	Cincinnati	(United States) Mimi Arnold	(United States) Barbara Breit	6-4, 6-3
1956	Indianapolis	(United States) Mary Ann Mitchell	(United States) Barbara Green	6-8, 6-2, 6-2
1957	Milwaukee	(United States) Karol Fageros	(United States) Lois Felix	6-3, 6-2
1958	Indianapolis	(United States) Susan Hodgeman	(United States) Marilyn Montgomery	6-3, 6-0
1959	Milwaukee	(United States) Karol Fageros (2)	(United States) Dottie Head Knode	3-6, 6-4, 6-3
1960	Indianapolis	(United States) Susan Hodgeman	(United States) Farel Footman	6-1, 6-2
1961	Milwaukee	(Brazil) Mary Habicht	(United States) Lynn Haines	1-6, 6-2, 6-0
1962	Indianapolis	(United States) Tory Ann Fretz	(United States) Julie Heldman	8-6, 6-3
1963	Milwaukee	(United States) Nancy Richey	(United States) Vicki Palmer	6-2, 7-5
1964	Indianapolis	(United States) Julie Heldman	(United States) Jean Danilovich	6-4, 0-6, 7-5
1965	Milwaukee	(United States) Nancy Richey (2)	(United States) Carole Caldwell Graebner	6-1, 6-0
1966	Indianapolis	(United States) Nancy Richey (3)	(United States) Peachy Kellmeyer	6-0, 6-1
1967	Indianapolis	(United States) Nancy Richey (4)	(Australia) Kerry Melville	6-4, 6-0
1968	Indianapolis	(United States) Nancy Richey (5)	(United States) Stephanie DeFina	6-3, 6-2
↓ Open era ↓
1969	Cincinnati	(Australia) Lesley Turner Bowrey	(France) Gail Sherriff Chanfreau	1-6, 7-5, 10-10, ret.
↓ Grand Prix circuit ↓
1970	Cincinnati	(United States) Rosemary Casals	(United States) Nancy Richey	6-3, 6-3
1971	Cincinnati	(United Kingdom) Virginia Wade	(United States) Linda Tuero	6-3, 6-3
1972	Cincinnati	(Australia) Margaret Smith Court	(Australia) Evonne Goolagong	3-6, 6-2, 7-5
1973	Cincinnati	(Australia) Evonne Goolagong	(United States) Chris Evert	6-2, 7-5

== Tournament statistics ==
=== Men ===
- Most Singles Titles: (United States) Charles A. Chase (4)
- Most Singles Finals: (United States) Marty Riessen (6)

=== Women ===
- Most Singles Titles: (United States) Catherine Wolf (7)
- Most Singles Finals: (United States) Carrie Neely (14)

== See also ==
- Western Indoor Open (indoor event from 1920 to 1978)
