= 1907 U.S. National Championships (tennis) =

- Date: August 20–28 (M); June 25 – July 2 (W)
- Edition: 27th
- Category: Grand Slam
- Surface: Grass
- Location: Newport, R.I., United States (M); Philadelphia, PA, United States (W)

Champions

Men's singles
- (United States) William Larned

Women's singles
- (United States) Evelyn Sears

Men's doubles
- (United States) Fred Alexander / (United States) Harold Hackett

Women's doubles
- (United States) Marie Wimer / (United States) Carrie Neely

Mixed doubles
- (United States) May Sayers / (United States) Wallace F. Johnson
- U.S. National Championships

The 1907 U.S. National Championships tennis tournament (now known as the US Open) was a tennis tournament that took place from June to August of 1907.

The women's tournament was held from June 25 to July 2 on the outdoor grass courts at the Philadelphia Cricket Club in Philadelphia, Pennsylvania. The men's tournament was held from August 20 to August 28 on the outdoor grass courts at the Newport Casino in Newport, Rhode Island. It was the 27th U.S. National Championships and the third Grand Slam tournament of the three played that year.

== Finals ==
=== Men's singles ===
(United States) William Larned defeated (United States) Robert LeRoy 6–2, 6–2, 6–4

=== Women's singles ===
(United States) Evelyn Sears defeated (United States) Carrie Neely 6–3, 6-2

=== Men's doubles ===
(United States) Fred Alexander (USA) / (United States) Harold Hackett (USA) defeated (United States) Nat Thornton (USA) / (United States) Bryan M. Grant (USA) 6–2, 6–1, 6–1

=== Women's doubles ===
(United States) Marie Wimer (USA) / (United States) Carrie Neely (USA) defeated (United States) Edna Wildey (USA) / (United States) Natalie Wildey (USA) 6–1, 2–6, 6–4

=== Mixed doubles ===
(United States) May Sayers (USA) / (United States) Wallace F. Johnson (USA) defeated (United States) Natalie Widley (USA) / (United States) Herbert M. Tilden (USA) 6–1, 7–5

Preceded by 1907 Australasian Championships	Grand Slams	Succeeded by 1908 Wimbledon Championships
