= 1908 U.S. National Championships – Women's singles =

Women's singles
- 1908 U.S. National Championships

Final
- Champion: (United States) Maud Barger-Wallach
- Runner-up: (United States) Evelyn Sears
- Score: 6–3, 1–6, 6–3

Details
- Draw: 58
- Seeds: –

Events
| Singles | men | women |
| Doubles | men | women |
| ← 1907 · | U.S. National Championships | · 1909 → |

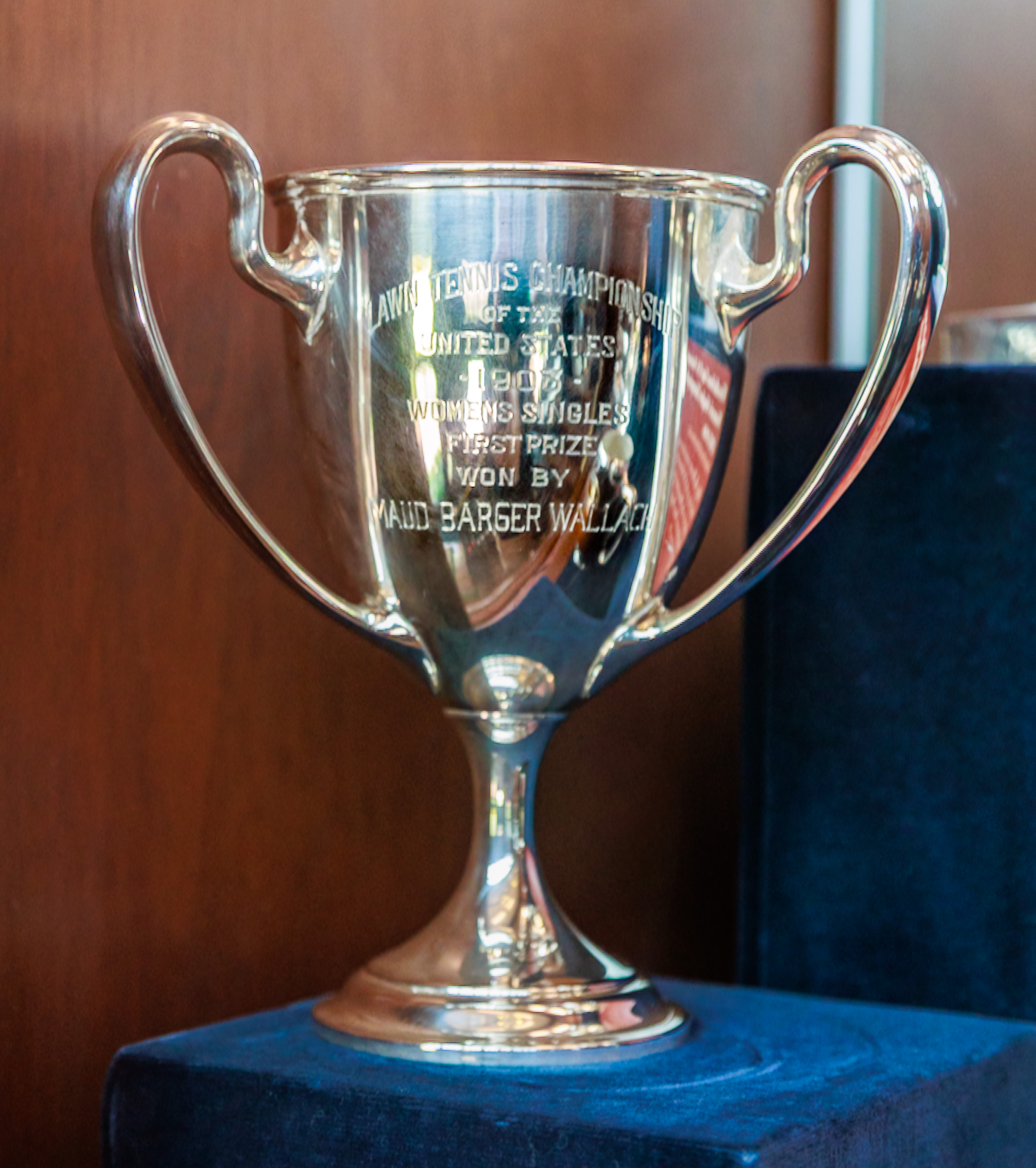
Barger-Wallach's 1908 National Women's Singles Championship Trophy at the International Tennis Hall of Fame museum

Maud Barger-Wallach won the singles tennis title of the 1908 U.S. Women's National Singles Championship by defeating reigning champion Evelyn Sears 6–3, 1–6, 6–3 in the challenge round. Barger-Wallach had won the right to challenge Sears by defeating Marie Wagner 4–6, 6–1, 6–3 in the final of the All Comers' competition. The event was played on outdoor grass courts and held at the Philadelphia Cricket Club in Wissahickon Heights, Chestnut Hill, Philadelphia, from June 22 through June 27, 1908.

== Draw ==
=== Challenge round ===
| Challenge Round |
| (United States) Evelyn Sears | 3 | 6 | 3 |
| (United States) Maud Barger-Wallach | 6 | 1 | 6 |

=== All Comers' finals ===
Quarterfinals
(United States) Helen Pouch | 6 | 5 | 1
(United States) Edith Rotch | 2 | 7 | 6
(United States) Matilda Borda | 2 | 3
(United States) Maud Barger-Wallach | 6 | 6
(United States) Margaret Johnson | 8 | 6
(United States) Eleanor Cohen | 6 | 2
(United States) Marie Wagner | 6 | 4 | 7
(United States) Carrie Neely | 4 | 6 | 5

Semifinals
(United States) Edith Rotch | 2 | 4
(United States) Maud Barger-Wallach | 6 | 6
(United States) Margaret Johnson | 5 | 2
(United States) Marie Wagner | 7 | 6

Finals
(United States) Maud Barger-Wallach | 4 | 6 | 6
(United States) Marie Wagner | 6 | 1 | 3

| Preceded by 1908 Wimbledon Championships – Women's singles | Grand Slam women's singles | Succeeded by 1909 Wimbledon Championships – Women's singles |
