= Gwendolyn Rees =

American tennis player

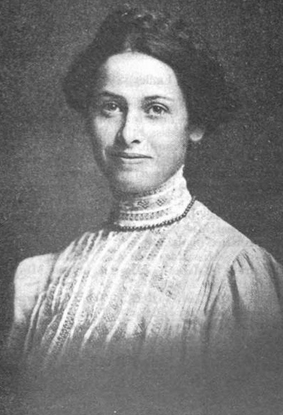
- Gwendolyn Rees, from a 1911 publication
- Born: April 5, 1892; Emporia, Kansas, U.S.
- Died: April 16, 1939 (aged 47); Mission, Texas, U.S.
- Other name: Gwendolyn Wagner
- Occupation: Tennis player

Gwendolyn Rees Wagner (April 5, 1892 – April 16, 1939) was an American women's tennis player, ranked tenth in the United States in 1913. She won the Western Championship in 1913.

== Early life and education ==
Rees was born in Emporia, Kansas, the daughter of William Rees and Sarah Ann Jones Rees. Her father and maternal grandparents were all from Wales.

== Career ==
Rees was a nationally ranked tennis player. She competed at the Middle States championship in New Jersey in 1909, and lost to Louise Hammond in the quarterfinals at the 1909 U.S. National Championships in Philadelphia. In 1910 she competed in singles and doubles events at the Western Championship tennis tournament, held in Illinois. In 1913, she won the Central West women's tennis championship, held at Kansas City, and the ladies' singles title at the Annual Northwestern Championship, held in Minnesota. She won both the singles and the ladies' doubles titles at the 1913 Western Championship held at the Onwentsia Club in Chicago. She played in at least one state championship event after she married in 1916.

The Gwendolyn Rees Cup was a women's tennis award, donated by William Rees and given at an event held at the Hamilton Grange Lawn Tennis Club in New York City.

== Personal life and legacy ==
Rees married Charles Pennell Wagner in 1916; they lived in Minnesota and had three sons. She died in 1939, at the age of 47, while visiting her parents in Mission, Texas. In 2002, she was inducted into the USTA Northern Hall of Fame.
