= Miriam Steever =

American tennis player

- Country (sports): United States

Singles

Grand Slam singles results
- US Open: 4th round (1916)

Doubles

Grand Slam doubles results
- US Open: Runner-up (1908)

Miriam Steever was an American amateur tennis player in the early part of the 20th century. She was from Chicago, Illinois.

== Tennis career ==
Steever paired with Carrie Neely to reach the doubles final at the 1908 U.S. National Championships (now known as the U.S. Open). Steever also reached the fourth round in singles at the U.S. Nationals in 1916.

In 1910 at the Cincinnati Open, Steever won the singles title and was a doubles finalist (with Dr. Jane Craven).

Steever's other achievements on the tennis court included:

Year	Competition	Result	Partner	Ref(s)
1907	Western Championships	Doubles titlist		
1909	Illinois State Championships	Singles titlist		
1910	Bi-State Championship (Kentucky & Ohio)	Doubles finalist	Edith Parker	
1910	Illinois State Championships	Doubles titlist	Carrie Neely	
1910	Illinois State Championships	Mixed doubles titlist	J. J. Forstall	
1910	Illinois State Championships	Singles titlist		
1910	Ohio State Championships	Doubles finalist	Jane Craven	
1910	Ohio State Championships	Mixed doubles finalist	Dr. Lee	
1910	Niagara-on-the-Lake	Doubles finalist	Jane Craven	
1910	Niagara-on-the-Lake	Mixed doubles winner	Hoerr	
1912	Illinois State Championships	Singles finalist		
1914	Illinois State Championships	Doubles winner	Edith Parker	
1915	Western Championships	Singles semifinalist		
1916	Delaware State Championships	Doubles quarters	Taylor	
1916	Delaware State Championships	Single semis		
1916	Western Championships	Doubles titlist	Mary K. Vorhees	

== Grand Slam finals ==
=== Doubles (1 runner-up) ===
Result	Year	Championship	Surface	Partner	Opponents	Score
Loss	1908	US National Championship	Grass	(United States) Carrie Neely	(United States) Evelyn Sears (United States) Margaret Curtis	3–6, 7–5, 7–9
