= 1907 Grand National =

English steeplechase horse race

- Grand National
- Location: Aintree Racecourse
- Date: 22 March 1907
- Winning horse: Eremon
- Starting price: 8/1
- Jockey: Alf Newey
- Trainer: Tom Coulthwaite
- Owner: Stanley Howard
- Conditions: Good

The 1907 Grand National was the 69th renewal of the renewal of the Grand National horse race that took place at Aintree Racecourse near Liverpool, England, on 22 March 1907.

The race was won by Eremon, an 8/1 bet ridden by jockey Alf Newey and trained by Tom Coulthwaite.

Tom West finished in second place, Patlander was third and Ravenscliffe fourth.

Twenty-three horses ran and all but one returned safely to the stables. Kilts was fatally injured in a fall at the first fence.

== Finishing Order ==
| Position | Name | Jockey | Age | Handicap (st-lb) | SP | Distance |
|---|---|---|---|---|---|---|
| 01 | Eremon | Alfred Newey | 7 | 10-01 | 8/1 | 6 Lengths |
| 02 | Tom West | H Murphy | 8 | 09-12 | 100/6 | |
| 03 | Patlander | J Lynn | 11 | 10-07 | 50/1 | |
| 04 | Ravenscliffe | Frank Lyall | 9 | 10-09 | 100/7 | |
| 05 | Barabbas II | Richard Morgan | 6 | 10-05 | 20/1 | |
| 06 | Ascetic's Silver | Aubrey Hastings | 10 | 12-05 | 7/1 | |
| 07 | Buckaway II | Harry Aylin | 9 | 10-04 | 40/1 | |
| 08 | Napper Tandy | Captain Collins | 10 | 10-13 | 33/1 | |

== Non-finishers ==
| Fence | Name | Jockey | Age | Handicap (st-lb) | SP | Fate |
|---|---|---|---|---|---|---|
| 11 | Timothy Titus | Charles Kelly | 9 | 11-10 | 100/8 | Fell |
| ? | Drumcree | Walter Bulteel | 13 | 11-09 | 20/1 | Fell |
| 22 | Roman Law | Algernon Anthony | 9 | 11-07 | 50/1 | Pulled Up |
| 27 | Red Lad | Joe Dillon | 7 | 11-03 | 7/1 | Fell |
| 18 | Seisdon Prince | M Phelan | 8 | 11-00 | 50/1 | Pulled Up |
| 03 | Rathvale | Edmund Driscoll | 6 | 10-13 | 20/1 | Fell |
| 15 | Extravagance | George Goswell | 6 | 10-11 | 10/1 | Fell |
| 08 | Centre Board | J Cain | 7 | 10-11 | 20/1 | Refused |
| 27 | Bouchal Ogue | C Graham | 11 | 10-07 | 50/1 | Fell |
| 22 | York II | T Moran | 8 | 10-06 | 50/1 | Fell |
| 01 | Kilts | R Harper | 7 | 10-03 | 100/6 | Fell |
| 24 | Detail | William Payne | 11 | 10-00 | 40/1 | Fell |
| 27 | Loop Head | A Hogan | 8 | 09-12 | 50/1 | Fell |
| ? | Teddy III | Mr O'B Butler | 9 | 09-13 | 50/1 | ? |
| ? | Foreman | Lawn | 8 | 09-07 | 50/1 | ? |
