= 1907 World Allround Speed Skating Championships =

International speed skating competition

World Allround Speed Skating Championships
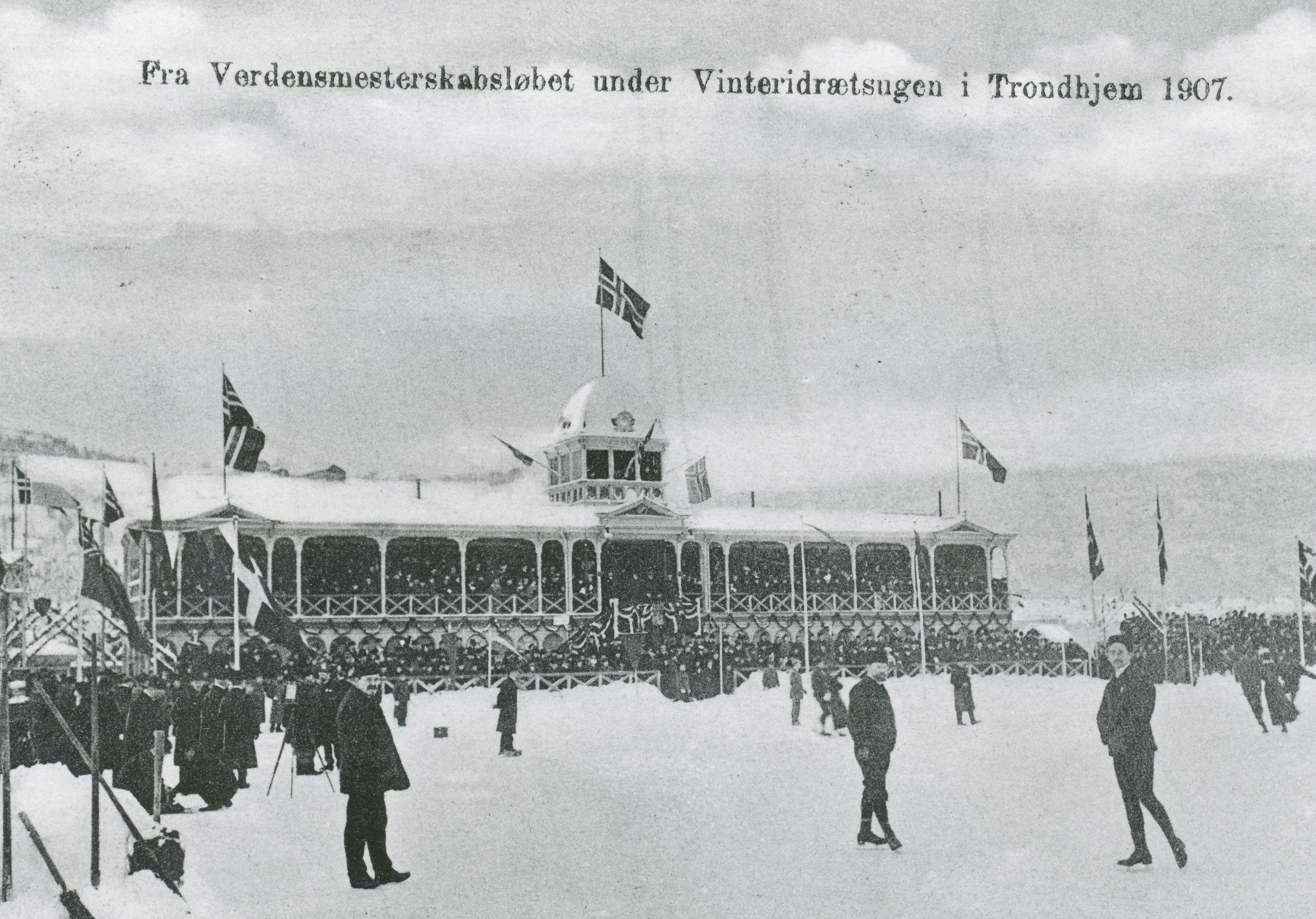
- Ice rink at the World Championships in 1907
- Venue: Øen Stadion, Trondheim, Norway
- Dates: 21–22 February
- Competitors: 14 from 3 nations

Medalist men
1st place, gold medalist(s)		Not declared

The 1907 World Allround Speed Skating Championships took place at 21 and 22 February 1907 at the ice rink Øen Stadion in Trondheim, Norway.

There was no defending champion.

There was no World champion declared, no one won three of the four distances.

== Allround results ==
Place	Athlete	Country	500m	5000m	1500m	10000m
NC1	Antti Wiklund	Finland	48.2 (3)	9:30.0 (2)	2:33.0 (1)	19:22.4 (2)
NC2	Gunnar Strömstén	Finland	48.0 (2)	9:27.6 (1)	2:38.2 (4)	19:09.4 (1)
NC3	Erkki Vanhala	Finland	48.8 (4)	9:36.0 (3)	2:34.6 (2)	19:43.6 (5)
NC4	Oscar Mathisen	Norway	50.4 (9)	9:40.8 (4)	2:36.2 (3)	19:23.0 (3)
NC5	Martin Sæterhaug	Norway	49.4 (5)	10:01.4 (7)	2:38.4 (5)	19:46.2 (6)
NC6	John Røst	Norway	50.2 (8)	9:50.0 (6)	2:45.6 (11)	19:41.6 (4)
NC7	Magnus Johansen	Norway	52.8 (13)	10:15.2 (9)	2:45.2 (10)	20:31.4 (7)
NC8	Einar Hansen	Norway	50.8 (11)	10:25.2 (11)	2:44.8 (8)	20:59.8 (8)
NC	Alf Horne	Norway	49.6 (6)	10:29.6 (13)	2:44.2 (7)	NS
NC	Oluf Jacobsen	Norway	49.6 (6)	10:13.8 (8)	2:42.0 (6)	NS
NC	Frithjof Hansen	Norway	50.6 (10)	10:36.8 (14)	2:49.4 (12)	NS
NC	Sverre Andersen	Norway	51.6 (12)	10:23.0 (10)	2:44.8 (8)	NS
NC	Ejnar Sørensen	Denmark	53.8 (14)	10:26.2 (12)	NS	NS
NC	Oluf Steen	Norway	47.4 (1)	9:45.4 (5)	NS	NS

* = Fell
NC = Not classified
NF = Not finished
NS = Not started
DQ = Disqualified

Source: SpeedSkatingStats.com

== Rules ==
Four distances have to be skated:

- 500m
- 1500m
- 5000m
- 10000m

One could only win the World Championships by winning at least three of the four distances, so there would be no World Champion if no skater won at least three distances.

Silver and bronze medals were not awarded.
