= 1907 U.S. National Championships – Women's singles =

Women's singles
- 1907 U.S. National Championships

Final
- Champion: (United States) Evelyn Sears
- Runner-up: (United States) Carrie Neely
- Score: 6–3, 6-2

Details
- Draw: 40
- Seeds: –

Events
Singles	men	women
Doubles	men	women
← 1906 ·	U.S. National Championships	· 1908 →

Evelyn Sears won the singles tennis title of the 1907 U.S. Women's National Singles Championship by defeating Carrie Neely 6–3, 6–2 in the final of the All Comers' tournament. Helen Homans was the reigning champion but did not defend her title in the Challenge Round. The event was played on outdoor grass courts and held at the Philadelphia Cricket Club in Wissahickon Heights, Chestnut Hill, Philadelphia from June 25 through July 2, 1907.

== Draw ==
=== All Comers' finals ===
Quarterfinals
(United States) Elizabeth Ostheimer	1	1
(United States) Evelyn Sears	6	6
(United States) Augusta Chapman	6	6
(United States) Phyllis Green	2	0
(United States) Rachel Harlan	6	4	3
(United States) Carrie Neely	2	6	6
(United States) Emily Scott	4	2
(United States) Helen Pouch	6	6

Semifinals
(United States) Evelyn Sears	6	6
(United States) Augusta Chapman	2	1
(United States) Carrie Neely	8	7
(United States) Helen Pouch	6	5

Finals
(United States) Evelyn Sears	6	6
(United States) Carrie Neely	3	2

Preceded by 1907 Wimbledon Championships – Women's singles	Grand Slam women's singles	Succeeded by 1908 Wimbledon Championships – Women's singles
