= Maud Barger-Wallach =

American tennis player

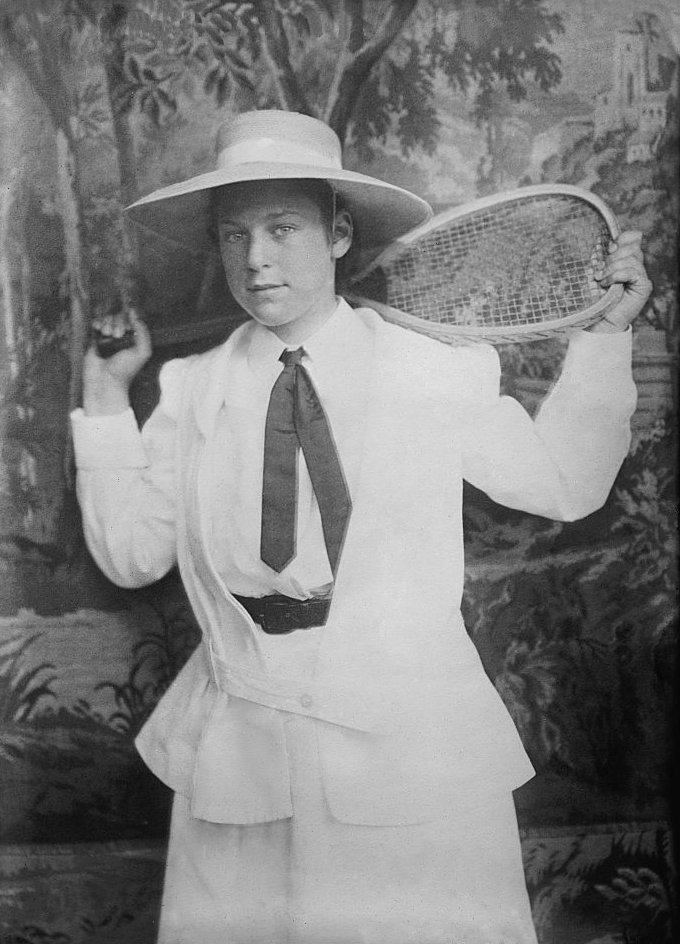
- Country (sports): United States
- Born: June 15, 1870; New York, New York
- Died: April 2, 1954 (aged 83); Baltimore, Maryland
- Plays: Right-handed
- Int. Tennis HoF: 1958 (member page)

Singles

Grand Slam singles results
- US Open: W (1908)

Doubles

Grand Slam doubles results
- US Open: F (1912)

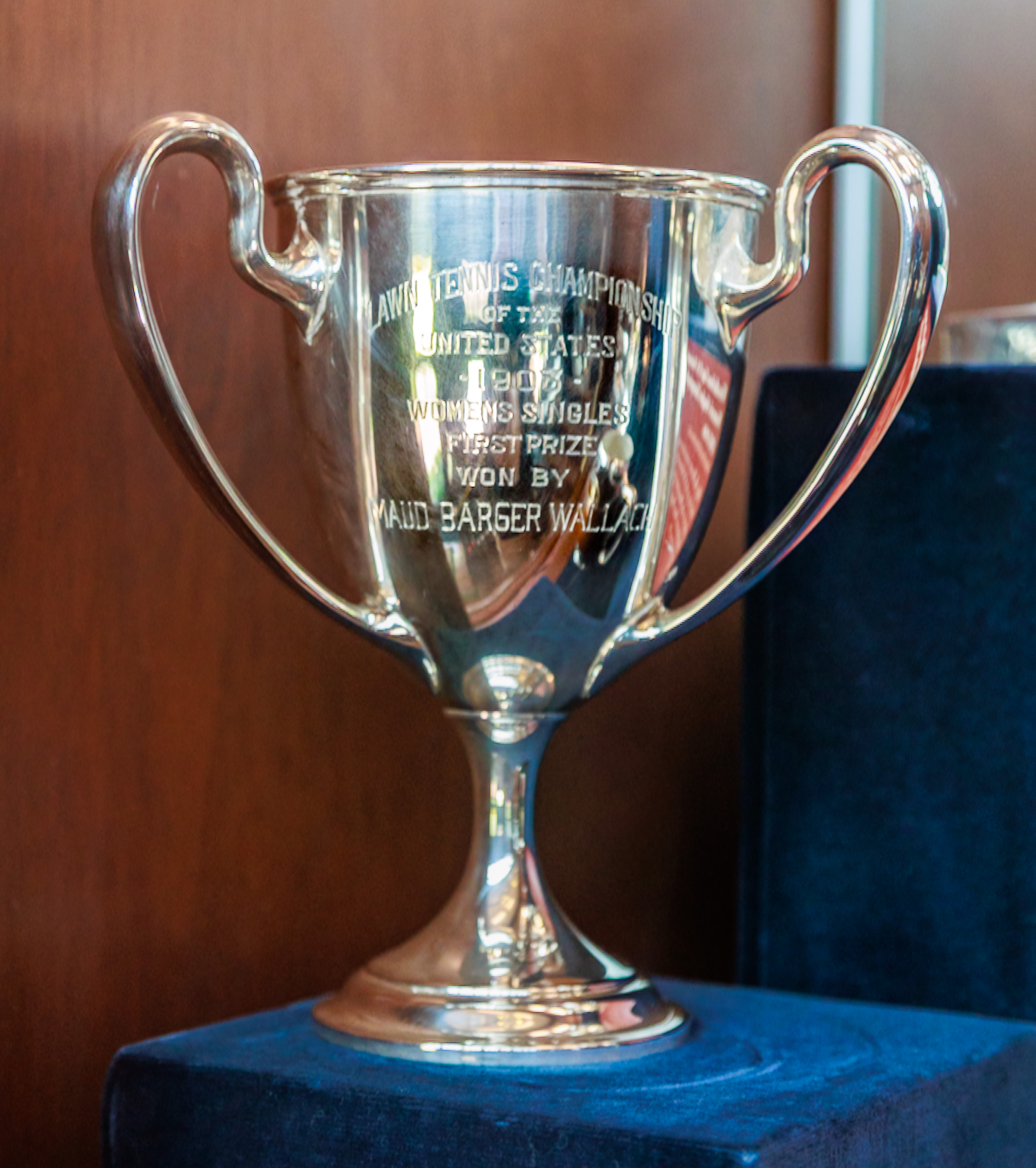
Barger-Wallach's 1908 National Women's Singles Championship Trophy at the International Tennis Hall of Fame museum

Maud Barger-Wallach (June 15, 1870 – April 2, 1954) was an American tennis player of the early 1900s.

== Biography ==
She was the daughter of Samuel F. Barger, a lawyer and director of the New York Central Railroad, and Edna Jenie LaFavor. In June 1890 she married sportsman Richard Wallach.

She only began playing tennis when she was about 30 years old. In 1908, Barger-Wallach became the oldest U.S. Open champion at the age of 38 (42-year-old Molla Mallory won in 1926, taking away her old-age record).

At the age of 61 in 1931, she traveled overseas with the U.S. men's tennis contingent, and when Sidney Wood of the U.S. won the Wimbledon Gentlemen's Singles over Frank Shields of the U.S. in the final, in a walkover because Shields was injured, Wood gave his trophy to Barger-Wallach to hold until the next time that he and Shields should play each other on grass (as at Wimbledon), telling her to give it to the winner. Wood finally met Shields in a tournament on grass at Queen's Club in London three years later, beating him, and Barger-Wallach then gave Wood's Wimbledon trophy to him.

She was a right-handed baseline player with an accurate but soft forehand and a weak backhand which, if possible, she tried to run around. She had an unorthodox playing style characterized by an underhand serve, accurate placements as well as tennis intelligence and determination.

Barger-Wallach was inducted in the International Tennis Hall of Fame in 1958.

== Grand Slam finals ==
=== Singles: 3 (1 title, 2 runners-up) ===
Result	Year	Championship	Surface	Opponent	Score
Loss	1906	U.S. National Championships	Grass	(United States) Helen Homans	4–6, 3–6
Win	1908	U.S. National Championships	Grass	(United States) Evelyn Sears	6–3, 1–6, 6–3
Loss	1909	U.S. National Championships	Grass	(United States) Hazel Hotchkiss	0–6, 1–6

=== Doubles: 1 runner-up ===
Result	Year	Championship	Surface	Partner	Opponents	Score
Loss	1912	U.S. National Championships	Grass	(United Kingdom) Mrs. Frederick Schmitz	(United States) Mary Browne (United States) Dorothy Green	2–6, 7–5, 0–6
