= Evelyn Sears =

American tennis player

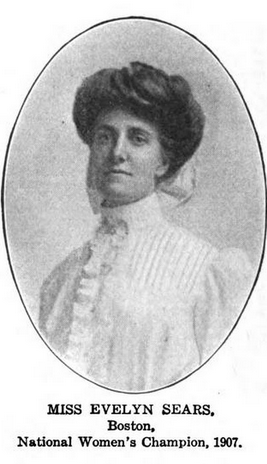
- Evelyn Sears, from a 1908 publication
- Full name: Evelyn Georgianna Sears
- Country (sports): United States
- Born: March 9, 1875 Waltham, MA, United States
- Died: November 10, 1966 (aged 91) Waltham, MA, United States

Grand Slam singles results
- US Open: W (1907)

Grand Slam doubles results
- US Open: W (1908)

Evelyn Georgianna Sears (March 9, 1875 – November 10, 1966) was an American tennis player at the beginning of the 20th century.

In 1907, she won the U.S. National Championship women's singles title, after beating Carrie Neely 6–3, 6–2 in the All-Comers final and the default of reigning champion Helen Homans in the Challenge Round. She also won the women's doubles title in 1908 with Margaret Curtis, beating Carrie Neely and Miriam Steever, 6–3, 5–7, 9–7.

She was a cousin of the seven times winner of the men's singles title at the U.S. National Championship Richard Sears.

== Grand Slam finals ==
=== Singles (1 title, 1 runner-up) ===
Result	Year	Championship	Surface	Opponent	Score
Win	1907	U.S. National Championships	Grass	(United States) Helen Homans	default
Loss	1908	U.S. National Championships	Grass	(United States) Maud Barger-Wallach	3–6, 6–1, 3–6

=== Doubles (1 title) ===
Result	Year	Championship	Surface	Partner	Opponents	Score
Win	1908	US National Championship	Grass	(United States) Margaret Curtis	(United States) Carrie Neely (United States) Miriam Steever	6–3, 5–7, 9–7
