= Carrie Neely =

American tennis player

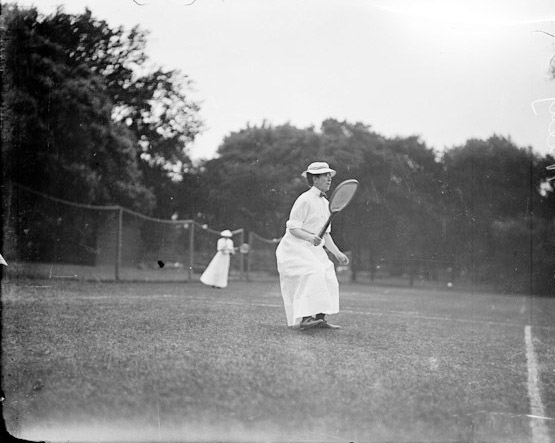
- Full name: Carrie Blair Neely
- Country (sports): USA
- Born: January 24, 1876 Chicago, IL, United States
- Died: November 29, 1938 (aged 62) Chicago, IL, United States

Grand Slam singles results
- US Open: F (1907)

Grand Slam doubles results
- US Open: W (1903, 1905, 1907)

Grand Slam mixed doubles results
- US Open: W (1898)

Carrie Neely (January 24, 1876 – November 29, 1938) was an American tennis player from the beginning of the 20th century.

== Biography ==
Carrie Neely was educated at the Dearborn Seminary, Chicago.

== Tennis career ==
In 1907, she reached the women's singles All Comer's final of the U.S. Women's National Championship, where she was beaten by Evelyn Sears.

She also won the mixed doubles in 1898, and won the women's doubles on three occasions (1903, 1905 and 1907).

At the Tri-State Tennis Tournament (current Cincinnati Open), she reached the singles final in 1915, the semifinals in 1902, 1903, 1904 and 1912, and the quarterfinals in 1901 and 1916. She paired with Winona Closterman to win the doubles title in 1902 and 1903, and teamed with Closterman again in 1904 to reach the doubles final. She won the mixed doubles title with Nat Emerson in 1903, and paired with Kreigh Collins, also of Chicago, to reach the mixed doubles final in 1901.

Neely won the Niagara International Tennis Tournament in 1902.

== Grand Slam finals ==
=== Singles (1 runner-up) ===
Result	Year	Championship	Surface	Opponent	Score
Loss	1907	U.S. National Championship	Grass	(United States) Evelyn Sears	3–6, 2–6

=== Doubles (3 titles, 3 runners-up) ===
Result	Year	Championship	Surface	Partner	Opponents	Score
Loss	1898	U.S. National Championship	Grass	(United States) Marie Wimer	(United States) Juliette Atkinson (United States) Kathleen Atkinson	1–6, 6–2, 6–4, 1–6, 2–6
Win	1903	U.S. National Championship	Grass	(United States) Elisabeth Moore	(United States) Miriam Hall (United States) Marion Jones	8–4, 6–1, 6–1
Loss	1904	U.S. National Championship	Grass	(United States) Elisabeth Moore	(United States) May Sutton Bundy (United States) Miriam Hall	6–3, 3–6, 3–6
Win	1905	U.S. National Championship	Grass	(United States) Helen Homans	(United States) F. Obertauffer (United States) Virginia Maule	6–0, 6–1
Win	1907	U.S. National Championship	Grass	(United States) Marie Wimer	(United States) Edna Wildey (United States) Natalie Widely	6–1, 2–6, 6–4
Loss	1908	U.S. National Championship	Grass	(United States) Miriam Steever	(United States) Evelyn Sears (United States) Margaret Curtis	3–6, 7–5, 7–9

=== Mixed doubles (1 title, 1 runner-up) ===
Result	Year	Championship	Surface	Partner	Opponents	Score
Win	1898	U.S. National Championship	Grass	(United States) Edwin Fischer	(United States) Helen Chapman (United States) J. A. Hill	6–2, 6–4, 8–6
Loss	1903	U.S. National Championship	Grass	(United States) W. H. Rowland	(United States) Helen Chapman (United States) Harry Allen	4–6, 5–7
