= 1892 in tennis =

This page covers all the important events in the sport of tennis in 1892. It provides the results of notable tournaments throughout the year on both the men's and women's ILTF tennis circuits.

== Australian Open ==
No event.

== French Open ==
Not a Grand Slam event.

== Wimbledon ==
| Category | Champion(s) | Finalist(s) | Score |
|---|---|---|---|
| Men's singles | (United Kingdom) Wilfred Baddeley | (United Kingdom) Joshua Pim | 4–6, 6–3, 6–3, 6–2 |
| Women's singles | (United Kingdom) Lottie Dod | (United Kingdom) Blanche Hillyard | 6–1, 6–1 |
| Men's doubles | (United Kingdom) Harry Barlow (United Kingdom) Ernest Lewis | (United Kingdom) Herbert Baddeley (United Kingdom) Wilfred Baddeley | 4–6, 6–2, 8–6, 6–4 |

== US Open ==
| Category | Champion(s) | Finalist(s) | Score |
|---|---|---|---|
| Men's singles | (United States) Oliver Campbell | (United States) Fred Hovey | 7–5, 3–6, 6–3, 7–5 |
| Women's singles | (Ireland) Mabel Cahill | (United States) Elisabeth Moore | 5–7, 6–3, 6–4, 4–6, 6–2 |
| Men's doubles | (United States) Oliver Campbell (United States) Bob Huntington | (United States) Valentine Hall (United States) Edward Hall | 6–4, 6–2, 4–6, 6–3 |
| Women's doubles | (Ireland) Mabel Cahill (United States) Adeline McKinlay | (United States) Helen Day Harris (United States) Amy Williams | 6–1, 6–3 |
| Mixed doubles | (Ireland) Mabel Cahill (United States) Clarence Hobart | (United States) Elisabeth Moore (United States) Rodmond V. Beach | 6–3, 6–4 |
