= 1891 in tennis =

This page covers all the important events in the sport of tennis in 1891. It provides the results of notable tournaments throughout the year on both the men's and women's ILTF tennis circuits.

== Australian Open ==
No event.

== French Open ==
Not a Grand Slam event.

== Wimbledon ==
Category	Champion(s)	Finalist(s)	Score
Men's singles	(United Kingdom) Wilfred Baddeley	(United Kingdom) Joshua Pim	6–4, 1–6, 7–5, 6–0
Women's singles	(United Kingdom) Lottie Dod	(United Kingdom) Blanche Hillyard	6–2, 6–1
Men's doubles	(United Kingdom) Herbert Baddeley (United Kingdom) Wilfred Baddeley	(United Kingdom) Joshua Pim (United Kingdom) Frank Stoker	6–1, 6–3, 1–6, 6–2

== US Open ==
Category	Champion(s)	Finalist(s)	Score
Men's singles	(United States) Oliver Campbell	(United States) Clarence Hobart	2–6, 7–5, 7–9, 6–1, 6–2
Women's singles	(Ireland) Mabel Cahill	(United States) Ellen Roosevelt	6–4, 6–1, 4–6, 6–3
Men's doubles	(United States) Oliver Campbell (United States) Bob Huntington	(United States) Valentine Hall (United States) Clarence Hobart	6–3, 6–4, 8–6
Women's doubles	(Ireland) Mabel Cahill (United States) Emma Leavitt Morgan	(United States) Grace Roosevelt (United States) Ellen Roosevelt	2–6, 8–6, 6–4
Mixed doubles	(Ireland) Mabel Cahill; Wright	(United States) Grace Roosevelt; Lee	6–4, 6–0, 7–5 (Note: The Mixed Doubles event was not an official event in 1891)
