= Tennis Ireland =

Governing body for tennis on the island of Ireland

- Sport: Tennis
- Founded: 1908
- Affiliation: Tennis Europe
- Regional affiliation: Europe
- Headquarters: Building 2, Sport HQ 2, Sport Ireland Campus, Snugborough Road, Blanchardstown, Dublin 15
- President: Gerry Smyth
- Chairman: Ronan Reid
- CEO: Kevin Quinn
- Secretary: Rosamund Thompson

Official website
- www.tennisireland.ie
- (Republic of Ireland)

Tennis Ireland is the governing body for tennis for the island of Ireland, with responsibilities for clubs and competitions. It was founded in 1908 and has almost 180 affiliated clubs and with approximately 80,000 players. Tennis Ireland is divided into four Branches corresponding to the four provinces of Ireland, with its national headquarters located on the Sport Ireland Campus. Tennis Ireland governs the Ireland Davis Cup team and the Ireland Billie Jean King Cup team.

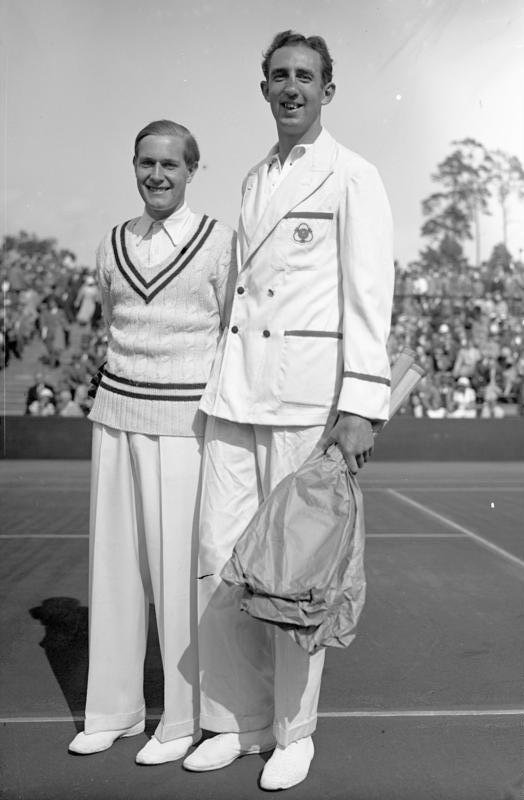
Gottfried von Cramm (Germany) and C.S. Rogers (Ireland) at a Davis Cup match, June, 1932 in Berlin

== History ==
Tennis Ireland was formed in 1908 as the Irish Lawn Tennis Association, a federation of 14 Irish tennis clubs. It became independent of the Lawn Tennis Association following the creation of the Irish Free State in 1922.

== Competitions ==
- Davis Cup
- Fed Cup

== Notable winners of the Irish Championships/Irish Open ==
Below is a list of Irish Championships/Irish Open winners some of whom were also Grand Slam finalists or former World No. 1 tennis players.

=== Men's ===
- Vere St. Leger Goold – 1879
- William Renshaw – 1880, 1881, 1882
- Ernest Renshaw – 1883, 1887, 1888
- Herbert Lawford – 1884, 1885, 1886
- Willoughby Hamilton – 1889
- Ernest Lewis – 1890, 1891
- Joshua Pim – 1893, 1894, 1895
- Wilfred Baddeley – 1896
- Reginald Doherty – 1899, 1900, 1901
- Laurence Doherty – 1902
- James Cecil Parke – 1904, 1905, 1908, 1909, 1910, 1911, 1912, 1913
- Frank Riseley – 1906
- Major Ritchie – 1907
- George Lyttleton-Rogers – 1928, 1936, 1937
- Sidney Wood – 1932
- Dinny Pails – 1946
- Tony Mottram – 1947
- Eric Sturgess – 1948
- Abe Segal – 1951
- Budge Patty – 1956
- Ashley Cooper – 1957
- Neale Fraser – 1958
- Mike Davies – 1958
- Dennis Ralston – 1960
- Rod Laver – 1962
- Bobby Wilson – 1963, 1964
- Tony Roche – 1965, 1970
- Tom Okker – 1968
- Bob Hewitt – 1969, 1972
- Cliff Drysdale – 1971
- Sherwood Stewart – 1974
- Bob Carmichael – 1978
- Paul Kronk – 1979
- Greg Rusedski – 1993, 1994, 1996

=== Ladies ===
- May Langrishe - 1879, 1883, 1886
- Maud Watson - 1884, 1885
- Lottie Dod - 1887
- Louisa Martin - 1889-1892, 1896, 1899-1900, 1902-1903
- Blanche Bingley Hillyard - 1888, 1894, 1897
- Charlotte Cooper - 1895, 1898
- Muriel Robb - 1901
- Elizabeth Ryan - 1919-1921, 1923
- Jadwiga Jędrzejowska - 1932
- Hilde Krahwinkel Sperling - 1934
- Helen Wills Moody - 1938
- Alice Marble - 1939
- Louise Brough - 1946
- Maureen Connolly - 1952, 1954
- Angela Mortimer - 1953
- Ann Haydon Jones - 1961
- Billie Jean King - 1963, 1969
- Maria Bueno - 1964, 1965
- Margaret Court - 1966, 1968, 1971, 1973
- Virginia Wade - 1970
- Evonne Goolagong Cawley - 1972

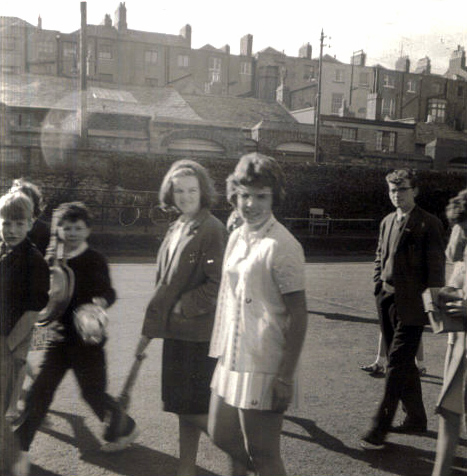
Billy Jean Moffitt (later King) at the Irish Open at Fitzwilliam Lawn Tennis Club, Dublin in the 1960s

== Irish Major Tournament Champions ==
Below is a list of Irish grand slam, Davis Cup, and Olympic champions. In total an Irish player has won a singles grand slam on eight occasions, a doubles grand slam on five occasions and a mixed doubles grand slam on four occasions. Irish players have won six Olympic medals in tennis. Eight Irish individuals have either won a grand slam event or an Olympic medal in tennis. All of these victories occurred prior to Ireland's secession from the United Kingdom; as such these individuals competed under the flag of the United Kingdom rather than the Flag of Ireland.

=== List of Irish Grand Slam Men's Singles Champions ===
==== Wimbledon ====
- Willoughby Hamilton – 1890
- Joshua Pim – 1893, 1894
- Harold Mahony – 1896

==== Australian Open ====
- James Cecil Parke – 1912

=== List of Irish Grand Slam Men's Doubles Champions ===
==== Wimbledon ====
- Joshua Pim – 1890, 1893
- Frank Stoker – 1890, 1893
- James Cecil Parke – 1912

=== List of Irish Grand Slam Women's Singles Champions ===
==== Wimbledon ====
- Lena Rice – 1890

==== US Open ====
- Mabel Cahill – 1891, 1892

=== List of Irish Grand Slam Women's Doubles Champions ===
==== US Open ====
- Mabel Cahill – 1891, 1892

=== List of Irish Mixed Doubles Champions ===
==== Wimbledon ====
- James Cecil Parke – 1914

==== US Open ====
- Mabel Cahill – 1890, 1891, 1892

=== List of Irish Davis Cup Champions ===
- James Cecil Parke – 1912*

=== List of Irish Olympic Medalists ===
- John Boland – Gold: 1896 Men's Singles*, 1896 Men's Doubles*
- Harold Mahony – Silver: 1900 Men's Singles*, 1900 Mixed doubles*
  Bronze: 1900 Men's Doubles*
- James Cecil Parke – Silver: 1908 Men's Outdoor doubles*

*Participants competed for the British Isles

== Irish Champions of Major professional tennis tournaments before the Open Era ==
Before the advent of the Open era of tennis competitions in April 1968, only amateurs were allowed to compete in established tournaments, including the four majors. However, many top tennis players turned professional to play legally for prize money in the years before the open era. There were also major pro events, where the world's top professional male players often played. These tournaments held with a certain tradition and longevity. According to Ellsworth Vines, "the Wembley tournament in London..., the U.S. professional championship, and to some extent the tournament in Paris were the major professional tournaments prior to 1968." Below is a list of Irish Champions at these events.

=== Men's Doubles Champions ===
==== French Pro Championship ====
- Albert Burke – 1936

== Clubs ==
- Claremont Railway Tennis Club
- Fitzwilliam Lawn Tennis Club

== See also ==
- Irish Open
- Ireland Davis Cup team
- Ireland Billie Jean King Cup team
- Sport in Ireland
