= List of Grand Slam mixed doubles champions =

This is a list of Mixed Doubles Grand Slam tennis tournament champions.

Although several players have won at least one title in each of the four majors to achieve the Career Grand Slam, only three players have won the Grand Slam, all four titles in a single calendar year. This includes one team, Margaret Court and Ken Fletcher in 1963, as well as Court and Owen Davidson separately with different partners. Billie Jean King completed the "non-calendar year Grand Slam" by winning all four majors in a row in a period spanning two calendar years.

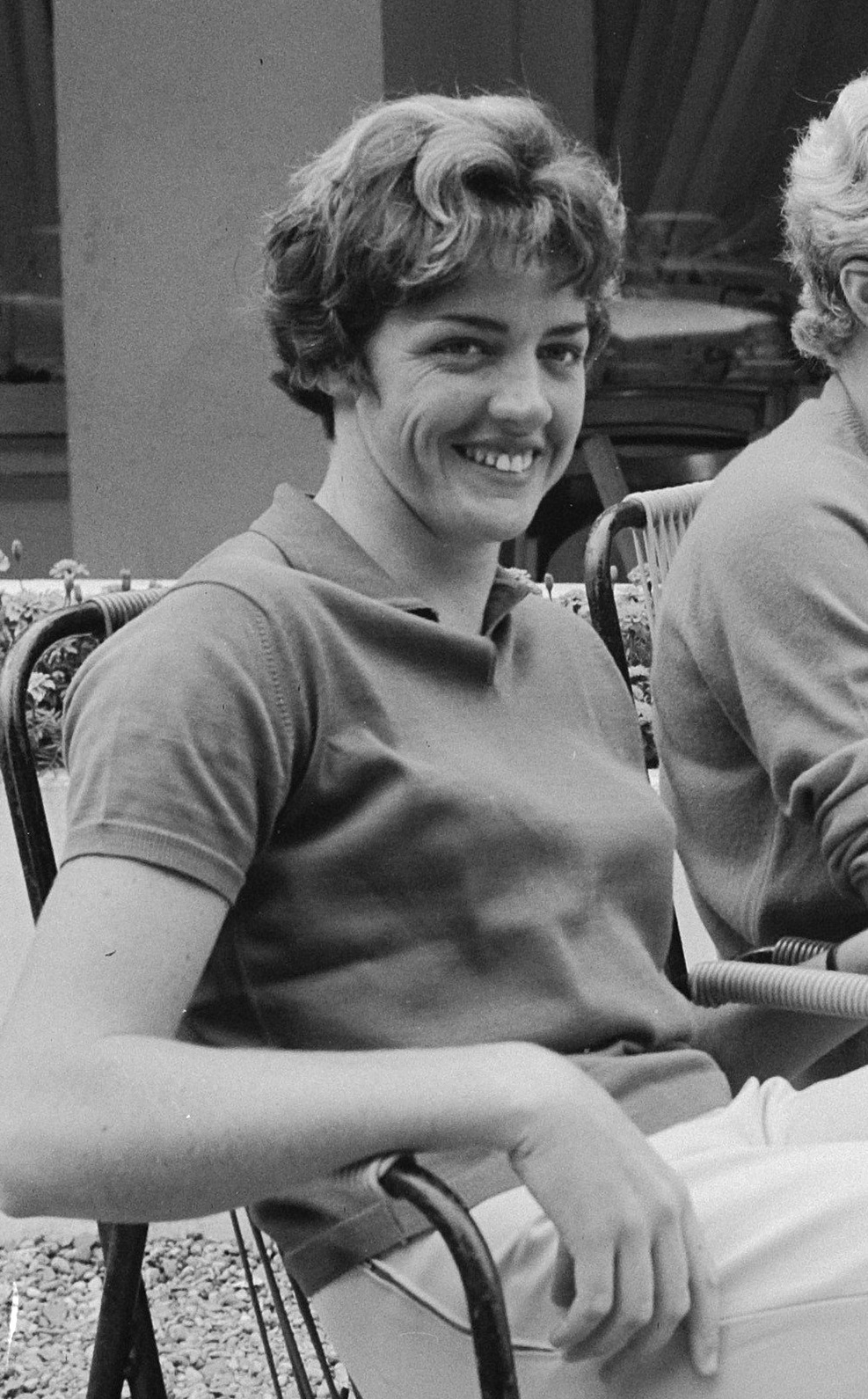
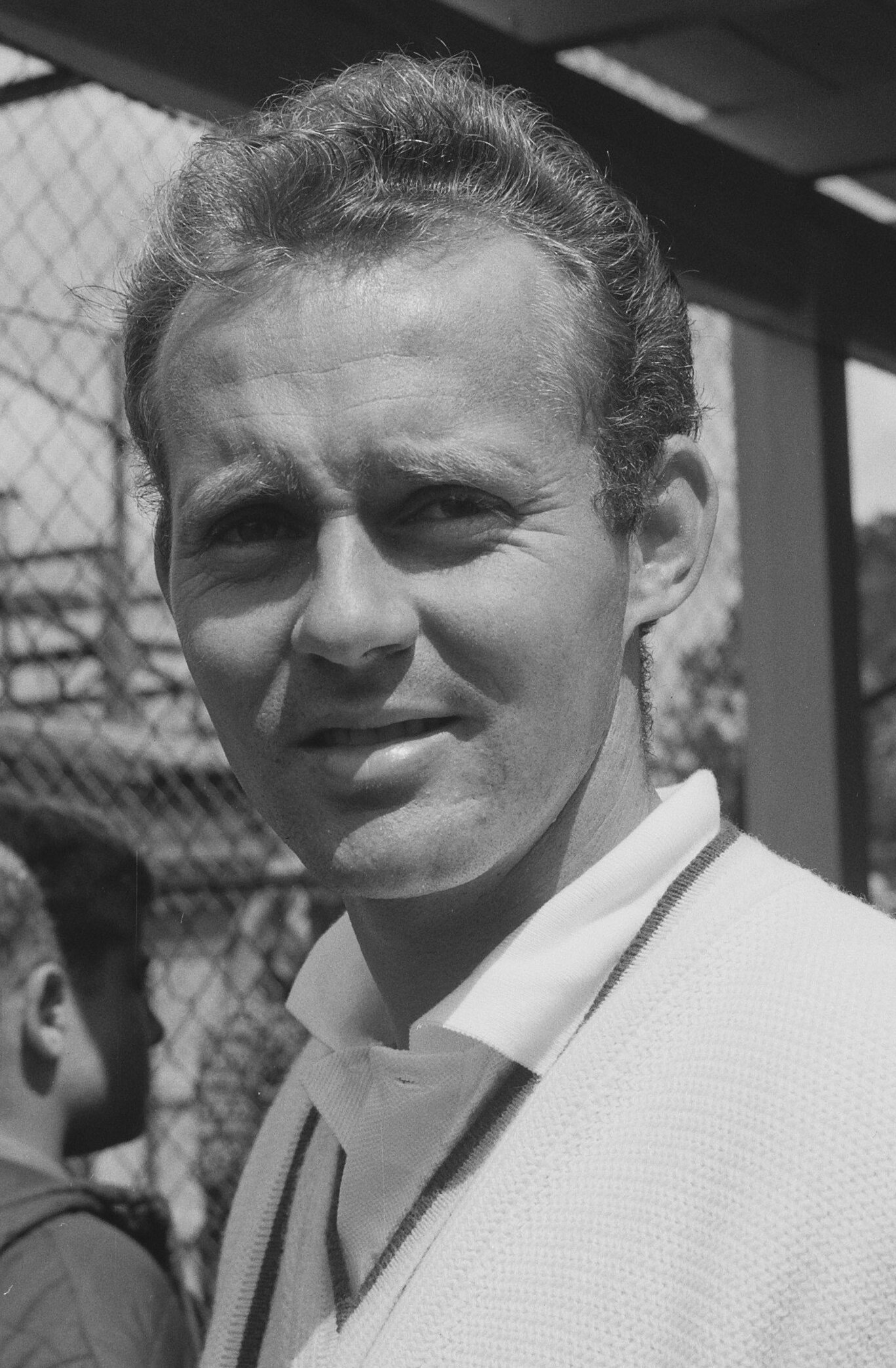
Margaret Court and Ken Fletcher won an all-time record 6 consecutive majors as a team; the only team to complete the Grand Slam.

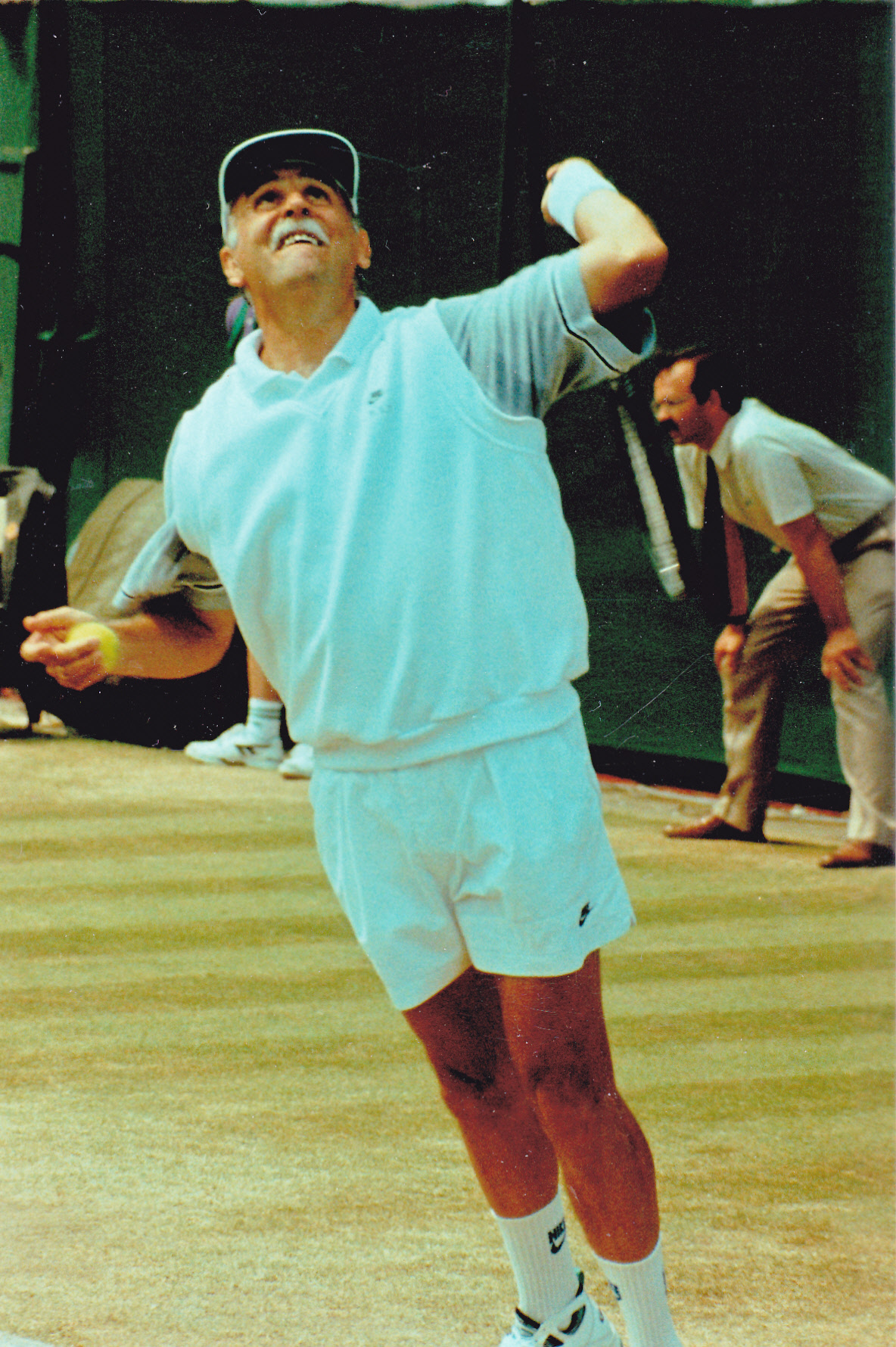
Owen Davidson is the most recent player to complete the Grand Slam.

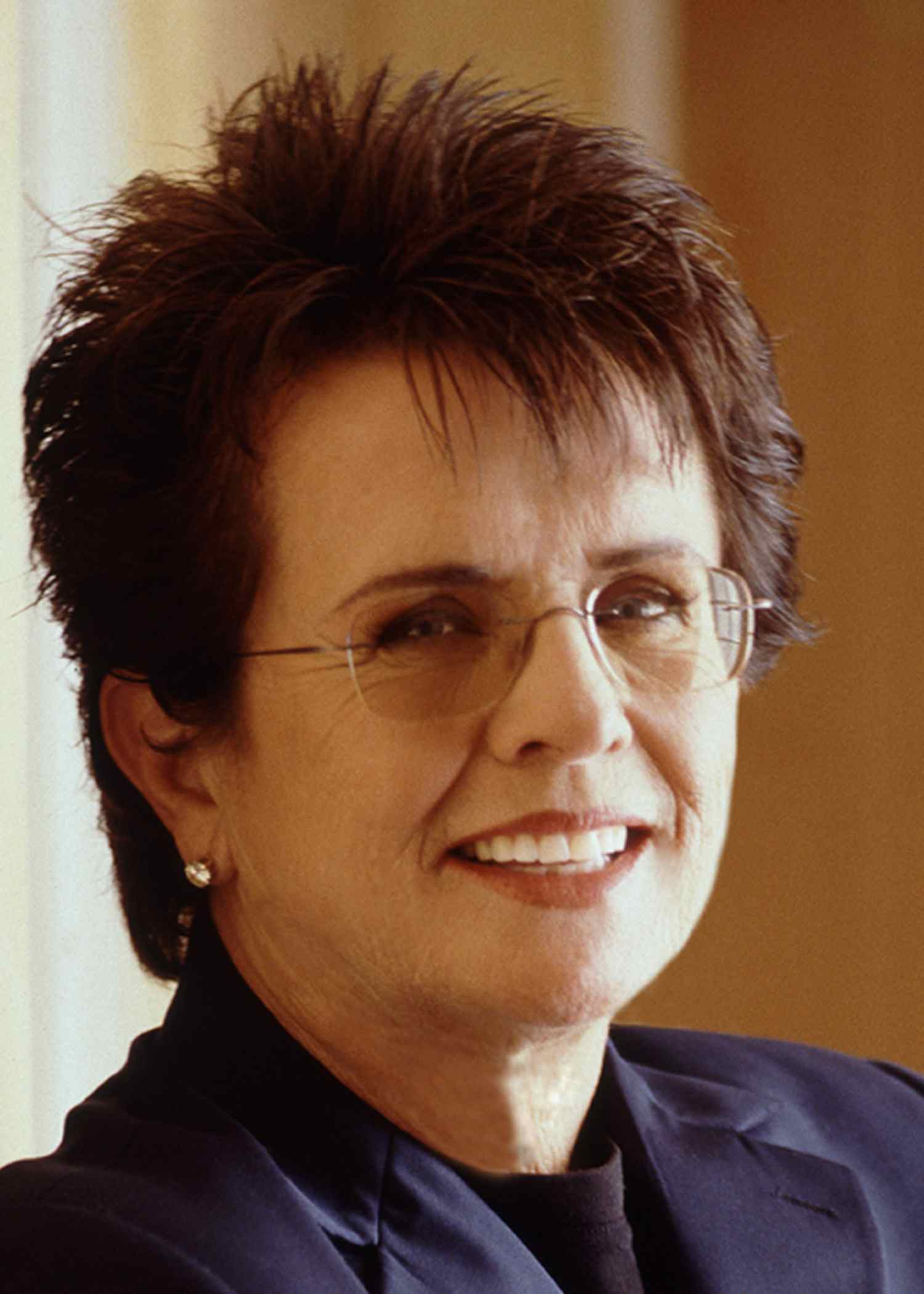
Billie Jean King accomplished the non-calendar year Grand Slam between 1967 and 1968.

== Champions by year ==
Tournament surface
AU	Hard (1988–Present); Grass (1905–1987)
FR	Clay
WB	Grass
US	Hard (1978–Present); Clay (1975–1977); Grass (1881–1974)
Flag Icon Key
List of National Flags

Year	Australian Open	French Open	Wimbledon	US Open
1887	started in 1922	started in 1925 (Note: Through 1924, the French Championships were open only to select French club players. Beginning in 1925, the French Championships were open to all nationalities, with the results shown here beginning with that year.)	started in 1913	(United States) L. Stokes (1/1) (United States) Joseph S. Clark (1/2)
1888	tournament not created	tournament not created	tournament not created	(United States) Marian Wright (1/1) (United States) Joseph S. Clark (2/2)
1889	tournament not created	tournament not created	tournament not created	(United States) Grace Roosevelt (1/1) (United States) A. E. Wright (1/1)
1890	tournament not created	tournament not created	tournament not created	(United Kingdom) Mabel Cahill (1/3) (United States) Rodmond Beach (1/1)
1891	tournament not created	tournament not created	tournament not created	(United Kingdom) Mabel Cahill (2/3) (United States) M. R. Wright (1/1)
1892	tournament not created	tournament not created	tournament not created	(United Kingdom) Mabel Cahill (3/3) (United States) Clarence Hobart (1/3)
1893	tournament not created	tournament not created	tournament not created	(United States) Ellen Roosevelt (1/1) (United States) Clarence Hobart (2/3)
1894	tournament not created	tournament not created	tournament not created	(United States) Juliette Atkinson (1/3) (United States) Edwin Fischer (1/4)
1895	tournament not created	tournament not created	tournament not created	(United States) Juliette Atkinson (2/3) (United States) Edwin Fischer (2/4)
1896	tournament not created	tournament not created	tournament not created	(United States) Juliette Atkinson (3/3) (United States) Edwin Fischer (3/4)
1897	tournament not created	tournament not created	tournament not created	(United States) Laura Henson (1/1) (United States) D. L. Magruder (1/1)
1898	tournament not created	tournament not created	tournament not created	(United States) Carrie Neely (1/1) (United States) Edwin Fischer (4/4)
1899	tournament not created	tournament not created	tournament not created	(United States) Elizabeth Rastall (1/1) (United States) Albert Hoskins (1/1)
1900	tournament not created	tournament not created	tournament not created	(United States) Margaret Hunnewell (1/1) (United States) Alfred Codman (1/1)
1901	tournament not created	tournament not created	tournament not created	(United States) Marion Jones (1/1) (United States) Raymond Little (1/1)
1902	tournament not created	tournament not created	tournament not created	(United States) Elisabeth Moore (1/2) (United States) Wylie Grant (1/2)
1903	tournament not created	tournament not created	tournament not created	(United States) Helen Chapman (1/1) (United States) Harry Allen (1/1)
1904	tournament not created	tournament not created	tournament not created	(United States) Elisabeth Moore (2/2) (United States) Wylie Grant (2/2)
1905	tournament not created	tournament not created	tournament not created	(United States) Augusta Schultz (1/1) (United States) Clarence Hobart (3/3)
1906	tournament not created	tournament not created	tournament not created	(United States) Sarah Coffin (1/1) (Australia) Edward Dewhurst (1/1)
1907	tournament not created	tournament not created	tournament not created	(United States) May Sayres (1/1) (United States) Wallace Johnson (1/4)
1908	tournament not created	tournament not created	tournament not created	(United States) Edith Rotch (1/1) (United States) Nathaniel Niles (1/1)
1909	tournament not created	tournament not created	tournament not created	(United States) Hazel Hotchkiss Wightman (1/6) (United States) Wallace Johnson (2/4)
1910	tournament not created	tournament not created	tournament not created	(United States) Hazel Hotchkiss Wightman (2/6) (United States) Joe Carpenter (1/1)
1911	tournament not created	tournament not created	tournament not created	(United States) Hazel Hotchkiss Wightman (3/6) (United States) Wallace Johnson (3/4)
1912	tournament not created	tournament not created	tournament not created	(United States) Mary Browne (1/4) (United States) Richard Williams (1/1)
1913	tournament not created	tournament not created	(United Kingdom) Agnes Tuckey (1/1) (United Kingdom) Hope Crisp (1/1)	(United States) Mary Browne (2/4) (United States) Bill Tilden (1/5)
1914	tournament not created	tournament not created	(United Kingdom) Ethel Thomson Larcombe (1/1) (United Kingdom) James Parke (1/1)	(United States) Mary Browne (3/4) (United States) Bill Tilden (2/5)
1915	tournament not created	tournament not created	World War I	(United States) Hazel Hotchkiss Wightman (4/6) (United States) Harry Johnson (1/1)
1916	tournament not created	tournament not created	World War I	(United States) Eleonora R. Sears (1/1) (United States) Willis E. Davis (1/1)
1917	tournament not created	tournament not created	World War I	(Norway) Molla Bjurstedt (1/3) (United States) Irving Wright (1/2)
1918	tournament not created	tournament not created	World War I	(United States) Hazel Hotchkiss Wightman (5/6) (United States) Irving Wright (2/2)
1919	tournament not created	tournament not created	(United States) Elizabeth Ryan (1/9) (United Kingdom) Randolph Lycett (1/3)	(United States) Marion Zinderstein (1/1) (United States) Vincent Richards (1/2)
1920	tournament not created	tournament not created	(France) Suzanne Lenglen (1/5) (Australia) Gerald Patterson (1/1)	(United States) Hazel Hotchkiss Wightman (6/6) (United States) Wallace Johnson (4/4)
1921	tournament not created	tournament not created	(United States) Elizabeth Ryan (2/9) (United Kingdom) Randolph Lycett (2/3)	(United States) Mary Browne (4/4) (United States) William Johnston (1/1)
1922	(Australia) Esna Boyd Robertson (1/3) (Australia) John Hawkes (1/5)	tournament not created	(France) Suzanne Lenglen (2/5) (Australia) Pat O'Hara Wood (1/1)	(United States) Molla Bjurstedt Mallory (2/3) (United States) Bill Tilden (3/5)
1923	(Australia) Sylvia Lance Harper (1/1) (Australia) Horace Rice (1/1)	tournament not created	(United States) Elizabeth Ryan (3/9) (United Kingdom) Randolph Lycett (3/3)	(United States) Molla Bjurstedt Mallory (3/3) (United States) Bill Tilden (4/5)
1924	(Australia) Daphne Akhurst Cozens (1/4) (Australia) Jim Willard (1/2)	tournament not created	(United Kingdom) Kathleen McKane Godfree (1/3) (United Kingdom) Brian Gilbert (1/1)	(United States) Helen Wills Moody (1/3) (United States) Vincent Richards (2/2)
1925	(Australia) Daphne Akhurst Cozens (2/4) (Australia) Jim Willard (2/2)	(France) Suzanne Lenglen (3/5) (France) Jacques Brugnon (1/2)	(France) Suzanne Lenglen (4/5) (France) Jean Borotra (1/5)	(United Kingdom) Kathleen McKane Godfree (2/3) (Australia) John Hawkes (2/5)
1926	(Australia) Esna Boyd Robertson (2/3) (Australia) John Hawkes (3/5)	(France) Suzanne Lenglen (5/5) (France) Jacques Brugnon (2/2)	(United Kingdom) Kathleen McKane Godfree (3/3) (United Kingdom) Leslie Godfree (1/1)	(United States) Elizabeth Ryan (4/9) (France) Jean Borotra (2/5)
1927	(Australia) Esna Boyd Robertson (3/3) (Australia) John Hawkes (4/5)	(France) Marguerite Broquedis Bordes (1/1) (France) Jean Borotra (3/5)	(United States) Elizabeth Ryan (5/9) (United States) Frank Hunter (1/2)	(United Kingdom) Eileen Bennett Whittingstall (1/3) (France) Henri Cochet (1/3)
1928	(Australia) Daphne Akhurst Cozens (3/4) (France) Jean Borotra (4/5)	(United Kingdom) Eileen Bennett Whittingstall (2/3) (France) Henri Cochet (2/3)	(United States) Elizabeth Ryan (6/9) (South Africa) Patrick Spence (1/2)	(United States) Helen Wills Moody (2/3) (Australia) John Hawkes (5/5)
1929	(Australia) Daphne Akhurst Cozens (4/4) (Australia) Edgar Moon (1/2)	(United Kingdom) Eileen Bennett Whittingstall (3/3) (France) Henri Cochet (3/3)	(United States) Helen Wills Moody (3/3) (United States) Frank Hunter (2/2)	(United Kingdom) Betty Nuthall Shoemaker (1/4) (United States) George Lott (1/4)
1930	(Australia) Nell Hall Hopman (1/4) (Australia) Harry Hopman (1/5)	(Germany) Cilly Aussem (1/1) (United States) Bill Tilden (5/5)	(United States) Elizabeth Ryan (7/9) (Australia) Jack Crawford (1/5)	(United States) Edith Cross (1/1) (United States) Wilmer Allison (1/1)
1931	(Australia) Marjorie Cox Crawford (1/3) (Australia) Jack Crawford (2/5)	(United Kingdom) Betty Nuthall Shoemaker (2/4) (South Africa) Patrick Spence (2/2)	(United States) Anna McCune Harper (1/1) (United States) George Lott (2/4)	(United Kingdom) Betty Nuthall Shoemaker (3/4) (United States) George Lott (3/4)
1932	(Australia) Marjorie Cox Crawford (2/3) (Australia) Jack Crawford (3/5)	(United Kingdom) Betty Nuthall Shoemaker (4/4) (United Kingdom) Fred Perry (1/4)	(United States) Elizabeth Ryan (8/9) (Spain) Enrique Maier (1/2)	(United States) Sarah Palfrey (1/5) (United Kingdom) Fred Perry (2/4)
1933	(Australia) Marjorie Cox Crawford (3/3) (Australia) Jack Crawford (4/5)	(United Kingdom) Margaret Scriven Vivian (1/1) (Australia) Jack Crawford (5/5)	(Germany) Hilde Krahwinkel Sperling (1/1) (Germany) Gottfried von Cramm (1/1)	(United States) Elizabeth Ryan (9/9) (United States) Ellsworth Vines (1/1)
1934	(Australia) Joan Hartigan Bathurst (1/1) (Australia) Edgar Moon (2/2)	(France) Colette Rosambert (1/1) (France) Jean Borotra (5/5)	(United Kingdom) Dorothy Round Little (1/3) (Japan) Ryuki Miki (1/1)	(United States) Helen Jacobs (1/1) (United States) George Lott (4/4)
1935	(Australia) Louise Bickerton (1/1) (France) Christian Boussus (1/1)	(Switzerland) Lolette Payot (1/1) (France) Marcel Bernard (1/2)	(United Kingdom) Dorothy Round Little (2/3) (United Kingdom) Fred Perry (3/4)	(United States) Sarah Palfrey Cooke (2/5) (Spain) Enrique Maier (2/2)
1936	(Australia) Nell Hall Hopman (2/4) (Australia) Harry Hopman (2/5)	(United Kingdom) Billie Yorke (1/1) (France) Marcel Bernard (2/2)	(United Kingdom) Dorothy Round Little (3/3) (United Kingdom) Fred Perry (4/4)	(United States) Alice Marble (1/7) (United States) Gene Mako (1/1)
1937	(Australia) Nell Hall Hopman (3/4) (Australia) Harry Hopman (3/5)	(France) Simonne Mathieu (1/2) (France) Yvon Petra (1/1)	(United States) Alice Marble (2/7) (United States) Don Budge (1/4)	(United States) Sarah Palfrey Cooke (3/5) (United States) Don Budge (2/4)
1938	(Australia) Margaret Wilson (1/1) (Australia) John Bromwich (1/4)	(France) Simonne Mathieu (2/2) (Kingdom of Yugoslavia) Dragutin Mitić (1/1)	(United States) Alice Marble (3/7) (United States) Don Budge (3/4)	(United States) Alice Marble (4/7) (United States) Don Budge (4/4)
1939	(Australia) Nell Hall Hopman (4/4) (Australia) Harry Hopman (4/5)	(United States) Sarah Palfrey Cooke (4/5) (United States) Elwood Cooke (1/1)	(United States) Alice Marble (5/7) (United States) Bobby Riggs (1/2)	(United States) Alice Marble (6/7) (Australia) Harry Hopman (5/5)
1940	(Australia) Nancye Wynne Bolton (1/4) (Australia) Colin Long (1/4)	tournament cancelled	World War II	(United States) Alice Marble (7/7) (United States) Bobby Riggs (2/2)
1941	World War II	France held under German occupation	World War II	(United States) Sarah Palfrey Cooke (5/5) (United States) Jack Kramer (1/1)
1942	World War II	France held under German occupation	World War II	(United States) Louise Brough Clapp (1/8) (United States) Fred Schroeder (1/1)
1943	World War II	France held under German occupation	World War II	(United States) Margaret Osborne duPont (1/10) (United States) William Talbert (1/4)
1944	World War II	France held under German occupation	World War II	(United States) Margaret Osborne duPont (2/10) (United States) William Talbert (2/4)
1945	World War II	France held under German occupation	World War II	(United States) Margaret Osborne duPont (3/10) (United States) William Talbert (3/4)
1946	(Australia) Nancye Wynne Bolton (2/4) (Australia) Colin Long (2/4)	(United States) Pauline Betz Addie (1/1) (United States) Budge Patty (1/1)	(United States) Louise Brough Clapp (2/8) (United States) Thomas Brown (1/2)	(United States) Margaret Osborne duPont (4/10) (United States) William Talbert (4/4)
1947	(Australia) Nancye Wynne Bolton (3/4) (Australia) Colin Long (3/4)	(South Africa) Sheila Summers (1/3) (South Africa) Eric Sturgess (1/5)	(United States) Louise Brough Clapp (3/8) (Australia) John Bromwich (2/4)	(United States) Louise Brough Clapp (4/8) (Australia) John Bromwich (3/4)
1948	(Australia) Nancye Wynne Bolton (4/4) (Australia) Colin Long (4/4)	(United States) Patricia Canning Todd (1/1) (Czechoslovakia) Jaroslav Drobný (1/1)	(United States) Louise Brough Clapp (5/8) (Australia) John Bromwich (4/4)	(United States) Louise Brough Clapp (6/8) (United States) Thomas Brown (2/2)
1949	(United States) Doris Hart (1/15) (Australia) Frank Sedgman (1/8)	(South Africa) Sheila Summers (2/3) (South Africa) Eric Sturgess (2/5)	(South Africa) Sheila Summers (3/3) (South Africa) Eric Sturgess (3/5)	(United States) Louise Brough Clapp (7/8) (South Africa) Eric Sturgess (4/5)
1950	(United States) Doris Hart (2/15) (Australia) Frank Sedgman (2/8)	(United States) Barbara Scofield (1/1) (Argentina) Enrique Morea (1/1)	(United States) Louise Brough Clapp (8/8) (South Africa) Eric Sturgess (5/5)	(United States) Margaret Osborne duPont (5/10) (Australia) Ken McGregor (1/1)
1951	(Australia) Thelma Coyne Long (1/5) (Australia) George Worthington (1/3)	(United States) Doris Hart (3/15) (Australia) Frank Sedgman (3/8)	(United States) Doris Hart (4/15) (Australia) Frank Sedgman (4/8)	(United States) Doris Hart (5/15) (Australia) Frank Sedgman (5/8)
1952	(Australia) Thelma Coyne Long (2/5) (Australia) George Worthington (2/3)	(United States) Doris Hart (6/15) (Australia) Frank Sedgman (6/8)	(United States) Doris Hart (7/15) (Australia) Frank Sedgman (7/8)	(United States) Doris Hart (8/15) (Australia) Frank Sedgman (8/8)
1953	(United States) Julia Sampson Hayward (1/1) (Australia) Rex Hartwig (1/2)	(United States) Doris Hart (9/15) (United States) Vic Seixas (1/8)	(United States) Doris Hart (10/15) (United States) Vic Seixas (2/8)	(United States) Doris Hart (11/15) (United States) Vic Seixas (3/8)
1954	(Australia) Thelma Coyne Long (3/5) (Australia) Rex Hartwig (2/2)	(United States) Maureen Connolly Brinker (1/1) (Australia) Lew Hoad (1/1)	(United States) Doris Hart (12/15) (United States) Vic Seixas (4/8)	(United States) Doris Hart (13/15) (United States) Vic Seixas (5/8)
1955	(Australia) Thelma Coyne Long (4/5) (Australia) George Worthington (3/3)	(United States) Darlene Hard (1/5) (South Africa) Gordon Forbes (1/1)	(United States) Doris Hart (14/15) (United States) Vic Seixas (6/8)	(United States) Doris Hart (15/15) (United States) Vic Seixas (7/8)
1956	(Australia) Beryl Penrose Collier (1/1) (Australia) Neale Fraser (1/5)	(Australia) Thelma Coyne Long (5/5) (Chile) Luis Ayala (1/1)	(United States) Shirley Fry Irvin (1/1) (United States) Vic Seixas (8/8)	(United States) Margaret Osborne duPont (6/10) (Australia) Ken Rosewall (1/1)
1957	(Australia) Fay Muller (1/1) (Australia) Mal Anderson (1/1)	(Czechoslovakia) Věra Puzejova Suková (1/1) (Czechoslovakia) Jiří Javorský (1/1)	(United States) Darlene Hard (2/5) (Australia) Mervyn Rose (1/1)	(United States) Althea Gibson (1/1) (Denmark) Kurt Nielsen (1/1)
1958	(Australia) Mary Bevis Hawton (1/1) (Australia) Robert Howe (1/4)	(United Kingdom) Shirley Bloomer Brasher (1/1) (Italy) Nicola Pietrangeli (1/1)	(Australia) Lorraine Coghlan Robinson (1/1) (Australia) Robert Howe (2/4)	(United States) Margaret Osborne duPont (7/10) (Australia) Neale Fraser (2/5)
1959	(South Africa) Sandra Reynolds Price (1/1) (Australia) Bob Mark (1/2)	(Mexico) Yola Ramírez Ochoa (1/1) (United Kingdom) Billy Knight (1/1)	(United States) Darlene Hard (3/5) (Australia) Rod Laver (1/3)	(United States) Margaret Osborne duPont (8/10) (Australia) Neale Fraser (3/5)
1960	(Australia) Jan Lehane O'Neill (1/2) (South Africa) Trevor Fancutt (1/1)	(Brazil) Maria Bueno (1/1) (Australia) Robert Howe (3/4)	(United States) Darlene Hard (4/5) (Australia) Rod Laver (2/3)	(United States) Margaret Osborne duPont (9/10) (Australia) Neale Fraser (4/5)
1961	(Australia) Jan Lehane O'Neill (2/2) (Australia) Bob Hewitt (1/6)	(United States) Darlene Hard (5/5) (Australia) Rod Laver (3/3)	(Australia) Lesley Turner Bowrey (1/4) (Australia) Fred Stolle (1/7)	(Australia) Margaret Court (1/21) (Australia) Bob Mark (2/2)
1962	(Australia) Lesley Turner Bowrey (2/4) (Australia) Fred Stolle (2/7)	(South Africa) Renée Schuurman Haygarth (1/1) (Australia) Robert Howe (4/4)	(United States) Margaret Osborne duPont (10/10) (Australia) Neale Fraser (5/5)	(Australia) Margaret Court (2/21) (Australia) Fred Stolle (3/7)
1963	(Australia) Margaret Court (3/21) (Australia) Ken Fletcher (1/10)	(Australia) Margaret Court (4/21) (Australia) Ken Fletcher (2/10)	(Australia) Margaret Court (5/21) (Australia) Ken Fletcher (3/10)	(Australia) Margaret Court (6/21) (Australia) Ken Fletcher (4/10)
1964	(Australia) Margaret Court (7/21) (Australia) Ken Fletcher (5/10)	(Australia) Margaret Court (8/21) (Australia) Ken Fletcher (6/10)	(Australia) Lesley Turner Bowrey (3/4) (Australia) Fred Stolle (4/7)	(Australia) Margaret Court (9/21) (Australia) John Newcombe (1/2)
1965	(Australia) Margaret Court (10/21) (Australia) John Newcombe (2/2)	(Australia) Margaret Court (11/21) (Australia) Ken Fletcher (7/10)	(Australia) Margaret Court (12/21) (Australia) Ken Fletcher (8/10)	(Australia) Margaret Court (13/21) (Australia) Fred Stolle (5/7)
1965	shared with	(Australia) Margaret Court (11/21) (Australia) Ken Fletcher (7/10)	(Australia) Margaret Court (12/21) (Australia) Ken Fletcher (8/10)	(Australia) Margaret Court (13/21) (Australia) Fred Stolle (5/7)
1965	(Australia) Robyn Ebbern (1/1) (Australia) Owen Davidson (1/11)	(Australia) Margaret Court (11/21) (Australia) Ken Fletcher (7/10)	(Australia) Margaret Court (12/21) (Australia) Ken Fletcher (8/10)	(Australia) Margaret Court (13/21) (Australia) Fred Stolle (5/7)
1966	(Australia) Judy Tegart-Dalton (1/1) (Australia) Tony Roche (1/2)	(South Africa) Annette Van Zyl (1/1) (South Africa) Frew McMillan (1/5)	(Australia) Margaret Court (14/21) (Australia) Ken Fletcher (9/10)	(United States) Donna Floyd Fales (1/1) (Australia) Owen Davidson (2/11)
1967	(Australia) Lesley Turner Bowrey (4/4) (Australia) Owen Davidson (3/11)	(United States) Billie Jean King (1/11) (Australia) Owen Davidson (4/11)	(United States) Billie Jean King (2/11) (Australia) Owen Davidson (5/11)	(United States) Billie Jean King (3/11) (Australia) Owen Davidson (6/11)
1968	(United States) Billie Jean King (4/11) (Australia) Dick Crealy (1/1)	↓ Open Era ↓		
1968	↓ Open Era ↓	(France) Françoise Dürr (1/4) (France) Jean-Claude Barclay (1/3)	(Australia) Margaret Court (15/21) (Australia) Ken Fletcher (10/10)	(United States) Mary-Ann Eisel (1/1) (United Kingdom) Peter Curtis (1/1)
1969	Margaret Court (16/21) (United States) Marty Riessen (1/7)	(Australia) Margaret Court (17/21) (United States) Marty Riessen (2/7)	(United Kingdom) Ann Haydon-Jones (2/2) (Australia) Fred Stolle (7/7)	(Australia) Margaret Court (18/21) (United States) Marty Riessen (3/7)
1969	shared with	(Australia) Margaret Court (17/21) (United States) Marty Riessen (2/7)	(United Kingdom) Ann Haydon-Jones (2/2) (Australia) Fred Stolle (7/7)	(Australia) Margaret Court (18/21) (United States) Marty Riessen (3/7)
1969	(United Kingdom) Ann Haydon-Jones (1/2) (Australia) Fred Stolle (6/7)	(Australia) Margaret Court (17/21) (United States) Marty Riessen (2/7)	(United Kingdom) Ann Haydon-Jones (2/2) (Australia) Fred Stolle (7/7)	(Australia) Margaret Court (18/21) (United States) Marty Riessen (3/7)
1970	not played	(United States) Billie Jean King (5/11) (South Africa) Bob Hewitt (2/6)	(United States) Rosemary Casals (1/3) (Romania) Ilie Năstase (1/2)	(Australia) Margaret Court (19/21) (United States) Marty Riessen (4/7)
1971	not played	(France) Françoise Dürr (2/4) (France) Jean-Claude Barclay (2/3)	(United States) Billie Jean King (6/11) (Australia) Owen Davidson (7/11)	(United States) Billie Jean King (7/11) (Australia) Owen Davidson (8/11)
1972	not played	(Australia) Evonne Goolagong Cawley (1/1) (Australia) Kim Warwick (1/2)	(United States) Rosemary Casals (2/3) (Romania) Ilie Năstase (2/2)	(Australia) Margaret Court (20/21) (United States) Marty Riessen (5/7)
1973	not played	(France) Françoise Dürr (3/4) (France) Jean-Claude Barclay (3/3)	(United States) Billie Jean King (8/11) (Australia) Owen Davidson (9/11)	(United States) Billie Jean King (9/11) (Australia) Owen Davidson (10/11)
1974	not played	(Czechoslovakia) Martina Navratilova (1/10) (Colombia) Iván Molina (1/1)	(United States) Billie Jean King (10/11) (Australia) Owen Davidson (11/11)	(United States) Pam Teeguarden (1/1) (Australia) Geoff Masters (1/1)
1975	not played	(Uruguay) Fiorella Bonicelli (1/1) (Brazil) Thomaz Koch (1/1)	(Australia) Margaret Court (21/21) (United States) Marty Riessen (6/7)	(United States) Rosemary Casals (3/3) (United States) Dick Stockton (1/2)
1976	not played	(South Africa) Ilana Kloss (1/1) (Australia) Kim Warwick (2/2)	(France) Françoise Dürr (4/4) (Australia) Tony Roche (2/2)	(United States) Billie Jean King (11/11) (Australia) Phil Dent (1/1)
1977	not played	(United States) Mary Carillo (1/1) (United States) John McEnroe (1/1)	(South Africa) Greer Stevens (1/3) (South Africa) Bob Hewitt (3/6)	(Netherlands) Betty Stöve (1/4) (South Africa) Frew McMillan (2/5)
1978	not played	(Czechoslovakia) Renáta Tomanová (1/1) (Czechoslovakia) Pavel Složil (1/1)	(Netherlands) Betty Stöve (2/4) (South Africa) Frew McMillan (3/5)	(Netherlands) Betty Stöve (3/4) (South Africa) Frew McMillan (4/5)
1979	not played	(Australia) Wendy Turnbull (1/5) (South Africa) Bob Hewitt (4/6)	(South Africa) Greer Stevens (2/3) (South Africa) Bob Hewitt (5/6)	(South Africa) Greer Stevens (3/3) (South Africa) Bob Hewitt (6/6)
1980	not played	(United States) Anne Smith (1/5) (United States) Billy Martin (1/1)	(United States) Tracy Austin (1/1) (United States) John Austin (1/1)	(Australia) Wendy Turnbull (2/5) (United States) Marty Riessen (7/7)
1981	not played	(United States) Andrea Jaeger (1/1) (United States) Jimmy Arias (1/1)	(Netherlands) Betty Stöve (4/4) (South Africa) Frew McMillan (5/5)	(United States) Anne Smith (2/5) (South Africa) Kevin Curren (1/3)
1982	not played	(Australia) Wendy Turnbull (3/5) (United Kingdom) John Lloyd (1/3)	(United States) Anne Smith (3/5) (South Africa) Kevin Curren (2/3)	(United States) Anne Smith (4/5) (South Africa) Kevin Curren (3/3)
1983	not played	(United States) Barbara Jordan (1/1) (United States) Eliot Teltscher (1/1)	(Australia) Wendy Turnbull (4/5) (United Kingdom) John Lloyd (2/3)	(Australia) Elizabeth Sayers (1/3) (Australia) John Fitzgerald (1/2)
1984	not played	(United States) Anne Smith (5/5) (United States) Dick Stockton (2/2)	(Australia) Wendy Turnbull (5/5) (United Kingdom) John Lloyd (3/3)	(Bulgaria) Manuela Maleeva Fragniere (1/1) (United States) Tom Gullikson (1/1)
1985	not played	(United States) Martina Navratilova (2/10) (Switzerland) Heinz Günthardt (1/2)	(United States) Martina Navratilova (3/10) (Australia) Paul McNamee (1/1)	(United States) Martina Navratilova (4/10) (Switzerland) Heinz Günthardt (2/2)
1986	not played	(United States) Kathy Jordan (1/2) (United States) Ken Flach (1/2)	(United States) Kathy Jordan (2/2) (United States) Ken Flach (2/2)	(Italy) Raffaella Reggi (1/1) (Spain) Sergio Casal (1/1)
1987	(United States) Zina Garrison (1/3) (United States) Sherwood Stewart (1/2)	(United States) Pam Shriver (1/1) (Spain) Emilio Sánchez (1/2)	(United Kingdom) Jo Durie (1/2) (United Kingdom) Jeremy Bates (1/2)	(United States) Martina Navratilova (5/10) (Spain) Emilio Sánchez (2/2)
1988	(Czechoslovakia) Jana Novotná (1/4) (United States) Jim Pugh (1/5)	(United States) Lori McNeil (1/1) (Mexico) Jorge Lozano (1/2)	(United States) Zina Garrison (2/3) (United States) Sherwood Stewart (2/2)	(Czechoslovakia) Jana Novotná (2/4) (United States) Jim Pugh (2/5)
1989	(Czechoslovakia) Jana Novotná (3/4) (United States) Jim Pugh (3/5)	(Netherlands) Manon Bollegraf (1/4) (Netherlands) Tom Nijssen (1/2)	(Czechoslovakia) Jana Novotná (4/4) (United States) Jim Pugh (4/5)	(United States) Robin White (1/1) (United States) Shelby Cannon (1/1)
1990	(Soviet Union) Natasha Zvereva (1/2) (United States) Jim Pugh (5/5)	(Spain) Arantxa Sánchez Vicario (1/4) (Mexico) Jorge Lozano (2/2)	(United States) Zina Garrison (3/3) (United States) Rick Leach (1/4)	(Australia) Elizabeth Sayers Smylie (2/3) (Australia) Todd Woodbridge (1/6)
1991	(United Kingdom) Jo Durie (2/2) (United Kingdom) Jeremy Bates (2/2)	(Czechoslovakia) Helena Suková (1/5) (Czechoslovakia) Cyril Suk (1/4)	(Australia) Elizabeth Sayers Smylie (3/3) (Australia) John Fitzgerald (2/2)	(Netherlands) Manon Bollegraf (2/4) (Netherlands) Tom Nijssen (2/2)
1992	(Australia) Nicole Provis (1/2) (Australia) Mark Woodforde (1/5)	(Spain) Arantxa Sánchez Vicario (2/4) (Australia) Todd Woodbridge (2/6)	(Latvia) Larisa Savchenko Neiland (1/4) (Czechoslovakia) Cyril Suk (2/4)	(Australia) Nicole Provis (2/2) (Australia) Mark Woodforde (2/5)
1993	(Spain) Arantxa Sánchez Vicario (3/4) (Australia) Todd Woodbridge (3/6)	(Russia) Eugenia Maniokova (1/1) (Russia) Andrei Olhovskiy (1/2)	(United States) Martina Navratilova (6/10) (Australia) Mark Woodforde (3/5)	(Czech Republic) Helena Suková (2/5) (Australia) Todd Woodbridge (4/6)
1994	(Latvia) Larisa Savchenko Neiland (2/4) (Russia) Andrei Olhovskiy (2/2)	(Netherlands) Kristie Boogert (1/1) (Netherlands) Menno Oosting (1/1)	(Czech Republic) Helena Suková (3/5) (Australia) Todd Woodbridge (5/6)	(South Africa) Elna Reinach (1/1) (United States) Patrick Galbraith (1/2)
1995	(Belarus) Natasha Zvereva (2/2) (United States) Rick Leach (2/4)	(Latvia) Larisa Savchenko Neiland (3/4) (Australia) Mark Woodforde (4/5)	(United States) Martina Navratilova (7/10) (United States) Jonathan Stark (1/1)	(United States) Meredith McGrath (1/1) (United States) Matt Lucena (1/1)
1996	(Latvia) Larisa Savchenko Neiland (4/4) (Australia) Mark Woodforde (5/5)	(Argentina) Patricia Tarabini (1/1) (Argentina) Javier Frana (1/1)	(Czech Republic) Helena Suková (4/5) (Czech Republic) Cyril Suk (3/4)	(United States) Lisa Raymond (1/5) (United States) Patrick Galbraith (2/2)
1997	(Netherlands) Manon Bollegraf (3/4) (United States) Rick Leach (3/4)	(Japan) Rika Hiraki (1/1) (India) Mahesh Bhupathi (1/8)	(Czech Republic) Helena Suková (5/5) (Czech Republic) Cyril Suk (4/4)	(Netherlands) Manon Bollegraf (4/4) (United States) Rick Leach (4/4)
1998	(United States) Venus Williams (1/2) (United States) Justin Gimelstob (1/2)	(United States) Venus Williams (2/2) (United States) Justin Gimelstob (2/2)	(United States) Serena Williams (1/2) (Belarus) Max Mirnyi (1/4)	(United States) Serena Williams (2/2) (Belarus) Max Mirnyi (2/4)
1999	(South Africa) Mariaan de Swardt (1/2) (South Africa) David Adams (1/2)	(Slovenia) Katarina Srebotnik (1/5) (South Africa) Piet Norval (1/1)	(United States) Lisa Raymond (2/5) (India) Leander Paes (1/10)	(Japan) Ai Sugiyama (1/1) (India) Mahesh Bhupathi (2/8)
2000	(Australia) Rennae Stubbs (1/2) (United States) Jared Palmer (1/2)	(South Africa) Mariaan de Swardt (2/2) (South Africa) David Adams (2/2)	(United States) Kimberly Po-Messerli (1/1) (United States) Donald Johnson (1/1)	(Spain) Arantxa Sánchez Vicario (4/4) (United States) Jared Palmer (2/2)
2001	(United States) Corina Morariu (1/1) (South Africa) Ellis Ferreira (1/1)	(Spain) Virginia Ruano Pascual (1/1) (Spain) Tomás Carbonell (1/1)	(Slovakia) Daniela Hantuchová (1/4) (Czech Republic) Leoš Friedl (1/1)	(Australia) Rennae Stubbs (2/2) (Australia) Todd Woodbridge (6/6)
2002	(Slovakia) Daniela Hantuchová (2/4) (Zimbabwe) Kevin Ullyett (1/1)	(Zimbabwe) Cara Black (1/5) (Zimbabwe) Wayne Black (1/2)	(Russia) Elena Likhovtseva (1/2) (India) Mahesh Bhupathi (3/8)	(United States) Lisa Raymond (3/5) (United States) Mike Bryan (1/4)
2003	(United States) Martina Navratilova (8/10) (India) Leander Paes (2/10)	(United States) Lisa Raymond (4/5) (United States) Mike Bryan (2/4)	(United States) Martina Navratilova (9/10) (India) Leander Paes (3/10)	(Slovenia) Katarina Srebotnik (2/5) (United States) Bob Bryan (1/7)
2004	(Russia) Elena Bovina (1/1) (Serbia and Montenegro) Nenad Zimonjić (1/5)	(France) Tatiana Golovin (1/1) (France) Richard Gasquet (1/1)	(Zimbabwe) Cara Black (2/5) (Zimbabwe) Wayne Black (2/2)	(Russia) Vera Zvonareva (1/2) (United States) Bob Bryan (2/7)
2005	(Australia) Samantha Stosur (1/3) (Australia) Scott Draper (1/1)	(Slovakia) Daniela Hantuchová (3/4) (France) Fabrice Santoro (1/1)	(France) Mary Pierce (1/1) (India) Mahesh Bhupathi (4/8)	(Slovakia) Daniela Hantuchová (4/4) (India) Mahesh Bhupathi (5/8)
2006	(Switzerland) Martina Hingis (1/7) (India) Mahesh Bhupathi (6/8)	(Slovenia) Katarina Srebotnik (3/5) (Serbia and Montenegro) Nenad Zimonjić (2/5)	(Russia) Vera Zvonareva (2/2) (Israel) Andy Ram (1/2)	(United States) Martina Navratilova (10/10) (United States) Bob Bryan(3/7)
2007	(Russia) Elena Likhovtseva (2/2) (Canada) Daniel Nestor (1/4)	(France) Nathalie Dechy (1/1) (Israel) Andy Ram (2/2)	(Serbia) Jelena Janković (1/1) (United Kingdom) Jamie Murray (1/5)	(Belarus) Victoria Azarenka (1/2) (Belarus) Max Mirnyi (3/4)
2008	(China) Sun Tiantian (1/1) (Serbia) Nenad Zimonjić (3/5)	(Belarus) Victoria Azarenka (2/2) (United States) Bob Bryan (4/7)	(Australia) Samantha Stosur (2/3) (United States) Bob Bryan (5/7)	(Zimbabwe) Cara Black (3/5) (India) Leander Paes (4/10)
2009	(India) Sania Mirza (1/3) (India) Mahesh Bhupathi (7/8)	(United States) Liezel Huber (1/2) (United States) Bob Bryan (6/7)	(Germany) Anna-Lena Grönefeld (1/2) (The Bahamas) Mark Knowles (1/1)	(United States) Carly Gullickson (1/1) (United States) Travis Parrott (1/1)
2010	(Zimbabwe) Cara Black (4/5) (India) Leander Paes (5/10)	(Slovenia) Katarina Srebotnik (4/5) (Serbia) Nenad Zimonjić (4/5)	(Zimbabwe) Cara Black (5/5) (India) Leander Paes (6/10)	(United States) Liezel Huber (2/2) (United States) Bob Bryan (7/7)
2011	(Slovenia) Katarina Srebotnik (5/5) (Canada) Daniel Nestor (2/4)	(Australia) Casey Dellacqua (1/1) (United States) Scott Lipsky (1/1)	(Czech Republic) Iveta Benešová (1/1) (Austria) Jürgen Melzer (1/1)	(United States) Melanie Oudin (1/1) (United States) Jack Sock (1/1)
2012	(United States) Bethanie Mattek-Sands (1/4) (Romania) Horia Tecău (1/1)	(India) Sania Mirza (2/3) (India) Mahesh Bhupathi (8/8)	(United States) Lisa Raymond (5/5) (United States) Mike Bryan (3/4)	(Russia) Ekaterina Makarova (1/1) (Brazil) Bruno Soares (1/3)
2013	(Australia) Jarmila Gajdošová (1/1) (Australia) Matthew Ebden (1/1)	(Czech Republic) Lucie Hradecká (1/1) (Czech Republic) František Čermák (1/1)	(France) Kristina Mladenovic (1/3) (Canada) Daniel Nestor (3/4)	(Czech Republic) Andrea Hlaváčková (1/1) (Belarus) Max Mirnyi (4/4)
2014	(France) Kristina Mladenovic (2/3) (Canada) Daniel Nestor (4/4)	(Germany) Anna-Lena Grönefeld (2/2) (Netherlands) Jean-Julien Rojer (1/1)	(Australia) Samantha Stosur (3/3) (Serbia) Nenad Zimonjić (5/5)	(India) Sania Mirza (3/3) (Brazil) Bruno Soares (2/3)
2015	(Switzerland) Martina Hingis (2/7) (India) Leander Paes (7/10)	(United States) Bethanie Mattek-Sands (2/4) (United States) Mike Bryan (4/4)	(Switzerland) Martina Hingis (3/7) (India) Leander Paes (8/10)	(Switzerland) Martina Hingis (4/7) (India) Leander Paes (9/10)
2016	(Russia) Elena Vesnina (1/1) (Brazil) Bruno Soares (3/3)	(Switzerland) Martina Hingis (5/7) (India) Leander Paes (10/10)	(United Kingdom) Heather Watson (1/1) (Finland) Henri Kontinen (1/1)	(Germany) Laura Siegemund (1/2) (Croatia) Mate Pavić (1/3)
2017	(United States) Abigail Spears (1/1) (Colombia) Juan Sebastián Cabal (1/1)	(Canada) Gabriela Dabrowski (1/2) (India) Rohan Bopanna (1/1)	(Switzerland) Martina Hingis (6/7) (United Kingdom) Jamie Murray (2/5)	(Switzerland) Martina Hingis (7/7) (United Kingdom) Jamie Murray (3/5)
2018	(Canada) Gabriela Dabrowski (2/2) (Croatia) Mate Pavić (2/3)	(Chinese Taipei) Latisha Chan (1/3) (Croatia) Ivan Dodig (1/4)	(United States) Nicole Melichar (1/1) (Austria) Alexander Peya (1/1)	(United States) Bethanie Mattek-Sands (3/4) (United Kingdom) Jamie Murray (4/5)
2019	(Czech Republic) Barbora Krejčíková (1/3) (United States) Rajeev Ram (1/2)	(Chinese Taipei) Latisha Chan (2/3) (Croatia) Ivan Dodig (2/4)	(Chinese Taipei) Latisha Chan (3/3) (Croatia) Ivan Dodig (3/4)	(United States) Bethanie Mattek-Sands (4/4) (United Kingdom) Jamie Murray (5/5)
2020	(Czech Republic) Barbora Krejčíková (2/3) (Croatia) Nikola Mektić (1/1)	Mixed doubles event not held due to COVID-19 pandemic.	Tournament cancelled due to COVID-19 pandemic.	Mixed doubles event not held due to COVID-19 pandemic.
2021	(Czech Republic) Barbora Krejčíková (3/3) (United States) Rajeev Ram (2/2)	(United States) Desirae Krawczyk (1/4) (United Kingdom) Joe Salisbury (1/2)	(United States) Desirae Krawczyk (2/4) (United Kingdom) Neal Skupski (1/2)	(United States) Desirae Krawczyk (3/4) (United Kingdom) Joe Salisbury (2/2)
2022	(France) Kristina Mladenovic (3/3) (Croatia) Ivan Dodig (4/4)	(Japan) Ena Shibahara (1/1) (Netherlands) Wesley Koolhof (1/1)	(United States) Desirae Krawczyk (4/4) (United Kingdom) Neal Skupski (2/2)	(Australia) Storm Sanders (1/1) (Australia) John Peers (1/3)
2023	(Brazil) Luisa Stefani (1/1) (Brazil) Rafael Matos (1/1)	(Japan) Miyu Kato (1/1) (Germany) Tim Pütz (1/1)	(Ukraine) Lyudmyla Kichenok (1/1) (Croatia) Mate Pavić (3/3)	(Kazakhstan) Anna Danilina (1/1) (Finland) Harri Heliövaara (1/1)
2024	(Chinese Taipei) Hsieh Su-wei (1/2) (Poland) Jan Zieliński (1/2)	(Germany) Laura Siegemund (2/2) (France) Édouard Roger-Vasselin (1/1)	(Chinese Taipei) Hsieh Su-wei (2/2) (Poland) Jan Zieliński (2/2)	(Italy) Sara Errani (1/4) (Italy) Andrea Vavassori (1/4)
2025	(Australia) Olivia Gadecki (1/2) (Australia) John Peers (2/3)	(Italy) Sara Errani (2/4) (Italy) Andrea Vavassori (2/4)	(Czech Republic) Kateřina Siniaková (1/1) (Netherlands) Sem Verbeek (1/1)	(Italy) Sara Errani (3/4) (Italy) Andrea Vavassori (3/4)
2026	(Australia) Olivia Gadecki (2/2) (Australia) John Peers (3/3)	(Italy) Sara Errani (4/4) (Italy) Andrea Vavassori (4/4)	(Latvia) Jeļena Ostapenko (1/1) (El Salvador) Marcelo Arévalo (1/1)	(Czech Republic) Karolína Muchová (1/1) (Czech Republic) Jakub Menšík (1/1)
Year	Australian Open	French Open	Wimbledon	US Open

== Champions list ==
=== Most Grand Slam mixed doubles titles ===
AO Australian Open	WIM Wimbledon
FO French Open	USO US Open

==== Individual ====
Active players and tournament records indicated in bold.

Titles	Player	AO	FO	WIM	USO	Years
21	(Australia) Margaret Court	**4**	**4**	5	8	1961–1975
15	(United States) Doris Hart	2	3	5	5	1949–1955
11	(Australia) Owen Davidson	2	1	4	4	1965–1974
11	(United States) Billie Jean King	1	2	4	4	1967–1976
10	(United States) Margaret Osborne duPont	0	0	1	**9**	1943–1962
10	(Australia) Ken Fletcher	2	3	4	1	1953–1968
10	(Czechoslovakia) / (United States) Martina Navratilova	1	2	4	3	1974–2006
10	(India) Leander Paes	3	1	4	2	1999–2016
9	(United States) Elizabeth Ryan	0	0	**7**	2	1919–1933
8	(United States) Louise Brough	0	0	4	4	1942–1950
8	(Australia) Frank Sedgman	2	2	2	2	1949–1952
8	(United States) Vic Seixas	0	1	4	3	1953–1956
8	(India) Mahesh Bhupathi	2	2	2	2	1997–2012
7	(United States) Alice Marble	0	0	3	4	1936–1940
7	(Australia) Fred Stolle	2	0	3	2	1961–1969
7	(United States) Marty Riessen	1	1	1	4	1969–1980
7	(United States) Bob Bryan	0	2	1	4	2003–2010
7	(Switzerland) Martina Hingis	2	1	2	2	2006–2017
6	(United States) Hazel Hotchkiss Wightman	0	0	0	6	1909–1920
6	(Australia) / (South Africa) Bob Hewitt	1	2	2	1	1961–1979
6	(Australia) Todd Woodbridge	1	1	1	3	1990–2001

==== Team ====
Active teams and tournament records indicated in bold.

Titles	Player	AO	FO	WIM	USO	Years
10	(Australia) Margaret Court (Australia) Ken Fletcher	2	**3**	**4**	1	1963–1968
8	(United States) Doris Hart (Australia) Frank Sedgman	2	2	2	2	1949–1952
8	(United States) Billie Jean King (Australia) Owen Davidson	0	1	**4**	3	1967–1974
7	(United States) Doris Hart (United States) Vic Seixas	0	1	3	3	1953–1955
6	(Australia) Margaret Court (United States) Marty Riessen	1 (Note: The 1969 Australian Open final was not played – title shared with Ann Haydon-Jones and Fred Stolle.)	1	1	3	1969–1975
4	(Australia) Nell Hall Hopman (Australia) Harry Hopman	**4**	0	0	0	1930–1939
4	(Australia) Nancye Wynne Bolton (Australia) Colin Long	**4**	0	0	0	1940–1948
4	(United States) Margaret Osborne duPont (United States) William Talbert	0	0	0	**4**	1943–1946
4	(United States) Margaret Osborne duPont (Australia) Neale Fraser	0	0	1	3	1958–1962
4	(Netherlands) Betty Stöve (South Africa) Frew McMillan	0	0	2	2	1977–1981
4	(Czech Republic) Jana Novotná (United States) Jim Pugh	2	0	1	1	1988–1989
4	(India) Leander Paes (Switzerland) Martina Hingis	1	1	1	1	2015–2016
4	**(Italy) Sara Errani** **(Italy) Andrea Vavassori**	0	2	0	2	2024–2026
Top 10

== Grand Slam achievements ==
Grasscourt major	Claycourt major	Hardcourt major

=== Grand Slam ===
Players who held all four Grand Slam titles simultaneously (in a calendar year).

Player	Australian Open	French Open	Wimbledon	US Open
(Australia) Margaret Court	1963	1963	1963	1963
(Australia) Ken Fletcher	1963	1963	1963	1963
(Australia) Margaret Court (2)	1965	1965	1965	1965
(Australia) Owen Davidson	1967	1967	1967	1967

=== Non-calendar year Grand Slam ===
Players who held all four Grand Slam titles simultaneously (not in a calendar year).

Player	Australian Open	French Open	Wimbledon	US Open
(United States) Billie Jean King (Note: With Owen Davidson and Dick Crealy.)	**1968**	1967	1967	1967

=== Career Grand Slam ===
Players who won all four Grand Slam titles over the course of their careers.

- The event at which the Career Grand Slam was completed indicated in **bold**.

==== Individual ====
Period	Player	Australian Open	French Open	Wimbledon	US Open
Amateur Era	(France) Jean Borotra	**1928**	1927	1925	1926
Amateur Era	(United States) Doris Hart	1949	1951	1951	**1951**
Amateur Era	(Australia) Frank Sedgman	1949	1951	1951	**1951**
Amateur Era	(United States) Doris Hart (2)	1950	1952	1952	**1952**
Amateur Era	(Australia) Frank Sedgman (2)	1950	1952	1952	**1952**
Amateur Era	(Australia) Margaret Court	1963	1963	**1963**	1961
Amateur Era	(Australia) Ken Fletcher	1963	1963	1963	**1963**
Amateur Era	(Australia) Margaret Court (2)	1964	1964	**1965**	1962
Amateur Era	(Australia) Margaret Court (3)	1965	1965	**1966**	1963
Amateur Era	(Australia) Owen Davidson	1965	1967	**1967**	1966
Amateur Era	(United States) Billie Jean King	**1968**	1967	1967	1967
Open Era	(Australia) Margaret Court (4)	1969	**1969**	1968	1964
Open Era	(United States) Marty Riessen	1969	1969	**1975**	1969
Open Era	(Australia) / (South Africa) Bob Hewitt	1961	1970	1977	**1979**
Open Era	(Australia) Todd Woodbridge	1993	1992	**1994**	1990
Open Era	(Australia) Mark Woodforde	1992	**1995**	1993	1992
Open Era	(Czech Republic) / (United States) Martina Navratilova	**2003**	1974	1985	1985
Open Era	(Slovakia) Daniela Hantuchová	2002	2005	2001	**2005**
Open Era	(India) Mahesh Bhupathi	**2006**	1997	2002	1999
Open Era	(Zimbabwe) Cara Black	**2010**	2002	2004	2008
Open Era	(India) Mahesh Bhupathi (2)	2009	**2012**	2005	2005
Open Era	(India) Leander Paes	2003	**2016**	1999	2008
Open Era	(Switzerland) Martina Hingis	2006	**2016**	2015	2015

==== Team ====
Period	Player	Australian Open	French Open	Wimbledon	US Open
**Amateur Era**	(United States) Doris Hart (Australia) Frank Sedgman	1949	1951	1951	**1951**
**Amateur Era**	(United States) Doris Hart (2) (Australia) Frank Sedgman (2)	1950	1952	1952	**1952**
**Amateur Era**	(Australia) Ken Fletcher (Australia) Margaret Court	1963	1963	1963	**1963**
**Open Era**	(Australia) Margaret Court (2) (United States) Marty Riessen	1969	1969	**1975**	1969
**Open Era**	(India) Leander Paes (Switzerland) Martina Hingis	2015	**2016**	2015	2015

=== Career Surface Slam ===
Players who won Grand Slam titles on clay, grass and hard courts over the course of their careers.

- The event at which the Career Surface Slam was completed indicated in **bold**

==== Individual ====
Player	Clay court slam	Hard court slam	Grass court slam
(South Africa) Frew McMillan	1966 French Open	**1978 US Open**	1978 Wimbledon Championships
(Australia) / (South Africa) Bob Hewitt	1970 French Open	**1979 US Open**	1961 Australian Championships
(United States) Marty Riessen	1969 French Open	**1980 US Open**	1969 Australian Open
(United States) Anne Smith	1980 French Open	1981 US Open	**1982 Wimbledon Championships**
(Australia) Wendy Turnbull	1979 French Open	1980 US Open	**1983 Wimbledon Championships**
(Czechoslovakia) / (United States) Martina Navratilova	1974 French Open	**1985 US Open**	1985 Wimbledon Championships
(United States) Martina Navratilova (2)	1985 French Open	1987 US Open	**1993 Wimbledon Championships**
(Australia) Todd Woodbridge	1992 French Open	1990 US Open	**1994 Wimbledon Championships**
(Czechoslovakia) / (Czech Republic) Helena Suková	1991 French Open	1993 US Open	**1994 Wimbledon Championships**
(Australia) Mark Woodforde	**1995 French Open**	1992 Australian Open	1993 Wimbledon Championships
(Latvia) Larisa Neiland	**1995 French Open**	1994 Australian Open	1992 Wimbledon Championships
(India) Mahesh Bhupathi	1997 French Open	1999 US Open	**2002 Wimbledon Championships**
(United States) Lisa Raymond	**2003 French Open**	1996 US Open	1999 Wimbledon Championships
(Slovakia) Daniela Hantuchová	**2005 French Open**	2002 Australian Open	2001 Wimbledon Championships
(United States) Bob Bryan	2008 French Open	2003 US Open	**2008 Wimbledon Championships**
(Zimbabwe) Cara Black	2002 French Open	**2008 US Open**	2004 Wimbledon Championships
(India) Mahesh Bhupathi (2)	**2012 French Open**	2005 US Open	2005 Wimbledon Championships
(United States) Mike Bryan	2003 French Open	2002 US Open	**2012 Wimbledon Championships**
(Serbia and Montenegro) / (Serbia) Nenad Zimonjić	2006 French Open	2004 Australian Open	**2014 Wimbledon Championships**
(India) Leander Paes	**2016 French Open**	2003 Australian Open	1999 Wimbledon Championships
(Switzerland) Martina Hingis	**2016 French Open**	2006 Australian Open	2015 Wimbledon Championships
(Croatia) Ivan Dodig	2018 French Open	**2022 Australian Open**	2019 Wimbledon Championships
(United States) Desirae Krawczyk	2021 French Open	**2021 US Open**	2021 Wimbledon Championships

==== Team ====
Player	Clay court slam	Hard court slam	Grass court slam
(United States) Mike Bryan (United States) Lisa Raymond	2003 French Open	2002 US Open	**2012 Wimbledon Championships**
(Switzerland) Martina Hingis (India) Leander Paes	**2016 French Open**	2015 Australian Open	2015 Wimbledon Championships

== Multiples titles in a season ==
♠ Player won all four major tournaments in the same year.

=== Three titles ===
★ Surface Slam (major titles on 3 different surfaces in the same season). (Note: The US Open switched to hard in 1978, and the Australian Open was played on grass until 1987.)

Australian—French—Wimbledon
1963^{♠}	(Australia) Ken Fletcher (Australia) Margaret Court
1965^{♠}	(Australia) Margaret Court
1967^{♠}	(Australia) Owen Davidson

| class="col-break " style=" padding-left: 1em;" |

Australian—French—U.S.
1963^{♠}	(Australia) Ken Fletcher (Australia) Margaret Court
1964	(Australia) Margaret Court
1965^{♠}	(Australia) Margaret Court
1967^{♠}	(Australia) Owen Davidson
Open Era
1969	(United States) Marty Riessen (Australia) Margaret Court

Australian—Wimbledon—U.S.
1963^{♠}	(Australia) Ken Fletcher (Australia) Margaret Court
1965^{♠}	(Australia) Margaret Court
1967^{♠}	(Australia) Owen Davidson
Open Era
2015	(Switzerland) Martina Hingis (India) Leander Paes

French—Wimbledon—U.S.
1949	(South Africa) Eric Sturgess
1951	(Australia) Frank Sedgman (United States) Doris Hart
1952	(Australia) Frank Sedgman (United States) Doris Hart
1953	(United States) Vic Seixas (United States) Doris Hart
1963^{♠}	(Australia) Ken Fletcher (Australia) Margaret Court
1965^{♠}	(Australia) Margaret Court
1967	(United States) Billie Jean King (Australia) Owen Davidson^{♠}
Open Era
1979^{★}	(South Africa) Bob Hewitt (Note: No Australian Open competition (1970–1986).)
1985^{★}	(United States) Martina Navratilova
2021^{★}	(United States) Desirae Krawczyk

=== Two titles ===
● Three-Quarter Slam (3 major titles in the same year).
‡ Channel Slam (French and Wimbledon title double).

Australian—French
1933	(Australia) Jack Crawford
1963^{♠}	(Australia) Ken Fletcher (Australia) Margaret Court^{●}
1964	(Australia) Ken Fletcher (Australia) Margaret Court^{●}
1965^{♠}	(Australia) Margaret Court
1967^{♠}	(Australia) Owen Davidson
Open Era
1969^{●}	(United States) Marty Riessen (Australia) Margaret Court
1998	(United States) Venus Williams (United States) Justin Gimelstob

| class="col-break " style=" padding-left: 1em;" |

Australian—Wimbledon
1958	(Australia) Robert Howe
1963^{♠}	(Australia) Ken Fletcher (Australia) Margaret Court
1965^{♠}	(Australia) Margaret Court
1967^{♠}	(Australia) Owen Davidson
Open Era
1969	(United Kingdom) Ann Haydon-Jones (Australia) Fred Stolle
1989	(Czechoslovakia) Jana Novotná (United States) Jim Pugh
2003	(United States) Martina Navratilova (India) Leander Paes
2005	(Slovakia) Daniela Hantuchová
2010	(Zimbabwe) Cara Black (India) Leander Paes
2015^{●}	(Switzerland) Martina Hingis (India) Leander Paes
2024	(Chinese Taipei) Hsieh Su-wei (Poland) Jan Zieliński

Australian—U.S.
1962	(Australia) Fred Stolle
1963^{♠}	(Australia) Ken Fletcher (Australia) Margaret Court
1964^{●}	(Australia) Margaret Court
1965^{♠}	(Australia) Margaret Court
1967^{♠}	(Australia) Owen Davidson
Open Era
1969^{●}	(United States) Marty Riessen (Australia) Margaret Court
1988	(Czechoslovakia) Jana Novotná (United States) Jim Pugh
1992	(Australia) Nicole Provis (Australia) Mark Woodforde
1993	(Australia) Todd Woodbridge
1997	(Netherlands) Manon Bollegraf (United States) Rick Leach
2000	(United States) Jared Palmer
2015^{●}	(Switzerland) Martina Hingis (India) Leander Paes

French—Wimbledon ‡
1925	(France) Suzanne Lenglen
1949	(South Africa) Eric Sturgess^{●} (South Africa) Sheila Piercey Summers
1951^{●}	(Australia) Frank Sedgman (United States) Doris Hart
1952^{●}	(Australia) Frank Sedgman (United States) Doris Hart
1953^{●}	(United States) Vic Seixas (United States) Doris Hart
1963^{♠}	(Australia) Ken Fletcher (Australia) Margaret Court^{♠}
1965	(Australia) Ken Fletcher (Australia) Margaret Court^{♠}
1967	(United States) Billie Jean King (Australia) Owen Davidson^{♠}
Open Era
1979^{●}	(South Africa) Bob Hewitt
1985^{●}	(United States) Martina Navrátilová
1986	(United States) Kathy Jordan (United States) Ken Flach
2008	(United States) Bob Bryan
2019	(Chinese Taipei) Latisha Chan (Croatia) Ivan Dodig
2021^{●}	(United States) Desirae Krawczyk

French—U.S.
1931	(United Kingdom) Betty Nuthall
1932	(United Kingdom) Fred Perry
1949^{●}	(South Africa) Eric Sturgess
1951^{●}	(Australia) Frank Sedgman (United States) Doris Hart
1952^{●}	(Australia) Frank Sedgman (United States) Doris Hart
1953^{●}	(United States) Vic Seixas (United States) Doris Hart
1963^{♠}	(Australia) Ken Fletcher (Australia) Margaret Court
1964^{●}	(Australia) Margaret Court
1965^{♠}	(Australia) Margaret Court
1967	(United States) Billie Jean King (Australia) Owen Davidson^{♠}
Open Era
1969^{●}	(United States) Marty Riessen (Australia) Margaret Court
1979^{●}	(South Africa) Bob Hewitt
1985	(United States) Martina Navrátilová^{●} (Switzerland) Heinz Günthardt
1987	(Spain) Emilio Sánchez
2021	(United States) Desirae Krawczyk^{●} (United Kingdom) Joe Salisbury
2025	(Italy) Sara Errani (Italy) Andrea Vavassori

Wimbledon—U.S.
1931	(United States) George Lott
1937	(United States) Don Budge
1938	(United States) Alice Marble (United States) Don Budge
1939	(United States) Alice Marble
1947	(United States) Louise Brough (Australia) John Bromwich
1948	(United States) Louise Brough
1949^{●}	(South Africa) Eric Sturgess
1951^{●}	(Australia) Frank Sedgman (United States) Doris Hart
1952^{●}	(Australia) Frank Sedgman (United States) Doris Hart
1953^{●}	(United States) Vic Seixas (United States) Doris Hart
1954	(United States) Vic Seixas (United States) Doris Hart
1955	(United States) Vic Seixas (United States) Doris Hart
1963^{♠}	(Australia) Ken Fletcher (Australia) Margaret Court
1965^{♠}	(Australia) Margaret Court
1967	(United States) Billie Jean King (Australia) Owen Davidson^{♠}
Open Era
1971	(United States) Billie Jean King (Australia) Owen Davidson
1973	(United States) Billie Jean King (Australia) Owen Davidson
1978	(Netherlands) Betty Stöve (South Africa) Frew McMillan
1979	(South Africa) Bob Hewitt^{●} (South Africa) Greer Stevens
1982	(United States) Anne Smith (South Africa) Kevin Curren
1985^{●}	(United States) Martina Navrátilová
1998	(United States) Serena Williams (Belarus) Max Mirnyi
2005	(India) Mahesh Bhupathi
2015^{●}	(Switzerland) Martina Hingis (India) Leander Paes
2017	(Switzerland) Martina Hingis (United Kingdom) Jamie Murray
2021^{●}	(United States) Desirae Krawczyk

== Tournament stats ==
=== Most titles per tournament ===
Tournament	Titles	Player
Australian Open	4	(Australia) Harry Hopman
Australian Open	4	(Australia) Thelma Coyne Long
Australian Open	4	(Australia) Margaret Court
French Open	4	(Australia) Margaret Court
Wimbledon	7	(United States) Elizabeth Ryan
US Open	9	(United States) Margaret Osborne duPont

== Most consecutive titles ==
AO Australian Open	WIM Wimbledon
FO French Open	USO US Open

=== Overall record ===
==== Per player ====
Titles	Player	First event	Last event
7	(Australia) Margaret Court	1962 USO	1964 FO
6	(Australia) Ken Fletcher	1963 AO	1964 FO
5	(Australia) Margaret Court (2)	1964 USO	1965 USO
5	(Australia) Owen Davidson	1966 USO	1967 USO
4	(United States) Billie Jean King	1967 FO	1968 AO

| class="col-break " style=" padding-left: 2em;" |

==== Per team ====
Titles	Player	First event	Last event
6	(Australia) Margaret Court (Australia) Ken Fletcher	1963 AO	1964 FO
3	(United States) Doris Hart (Australia) Frank Sedgman	1951 FO	1951 USO
3	(United States) Doris Hart (Australia) Frank Sedgman	1952 FO	1952 USO
3	(United States) Doris Hart (United States) Vic Seixas	1953 FO	1953 USO
3	(United States) Billie Jean King (Australia) Owen Davidson	1967 FO	1967 USO

=== At one tournament ===
==== Per player ====
Titles	Player	Tourn.	Years
5	(United States) Doris Hart	WIM	1951–55
5	(United States) Doris Hart	USO	1951–55
5	(Australia) Margaret Court	USO	1961–65
4	(United States) Margaret Osborne	USO	1943–46
4	(United States) William Talbert	USO	1943–46
4	(United States) Vic Seixas	WIM	1953–56

| class="col-break " style=" padding-left: 2em;" |

==== Per team ====
Titles	Team	Tourn.	Years
4	(United States) Margaret Osborne (United States) William Talbert	USO	1943–46
3	(United States) Juliette Atkinson (United States) Edwin Fischer	USO	1894–96
3	(Australia) Marjorie Cox Crawford (Australia) Jack Crawford	AO	1931–33
3	(Australia) Nancye Wynne Bolton (Australia) Colin Long	AO	1946–48
3	(United States) Doris Hart (United States) Vic Seixas	WIM	1953–55
3	(United States) Doris Hart (United States) Vic Seixas	USO	1953–55
3	(United States) Margaret Osborne (2) (Australia) Neale Fraser	USO	1958–60
3	(Australia) Margaret Court (Australia) Ken Fletcher	FO	1963–65

== Grand slam titles by decade ==
as of 2026 US Open.

1880s

2	Clark

1	G. Roosevelt, Stokes, A. E. Wright, M. Wright

1890s

4	Fischer

3	Atkinson, Cahill

2	Hobart

1	Beach, Henson, Hoskins, Magruder, Neely, Rastall, E. Roosevelt, M. R. Wright

1900s

2	Grant, W. Johnson, Moore

1	Allen, Chapman, Codman, Coffin, Dewhurst, Hobart, Hotchkiss Wightman, Hunnewell, Jones, Little, Niles, Rotch, Sayres, Schultz

1910s

4	Hotchkiss Wightman

3	Browne

2	Tilden, I. Wright

1	Bjurstedt, Carpenter, Crisp, Davis, H. Johnson, W. Johnson, Lycett, Parke, Richards, Ryan, Sears, Thomson Larcombe, Tuckey, R. Williams, Zinderstein

1920s

5	Hawkes, Lenglen, Ryan

4	Akhurst Cozens, Borotra

3	Bennet Whittingstall, Boyd Robertson, Cochet, McKane Godfree, Wills Moody

2	Bjurstedt Mallory, Brugnon, Hunter, Lycett, Tilden, Willard

1	Broquedis Bordes, Browne, Gilbert, Godfree, Hotchkiss Wightman, W. Johnson, Johnston, Lance Harper, Lott, Moon, Nuthall Shoemaker, O'Hara Wood, Patterson, Rice, Richards, Spence

1930s

6	Marble

5	Crawford, Hopman

4	Budge, Hall Hopman, Palfrey Cooke, Perry

3	Cox Crawford, Lott, Nuthall Shoemaker, Round Little, Ryan

2	Bernard, Maier, Mathieu

1	Allison, Aussem, Bickerton, Borotra, Boussus, Bromwich, Cooke, Cross, Hartigan Bathurst, Jacobs, Krahwinkel Sperling, Mako, McCune Harper, Miki, Mitić, Moon, Payot, Petra, Riggs, Rosambert, Scriven Vivian, Spence, Tilden, Vines, von Cramm, Wilson, Yorke

1940s

7	Brough Clapp

4	Long, Osborne duPont, Sturgess, Talbert, Wynne Bolton

3	Bromwich, Summers

2	Brown

1	Betz Addie, Canning Todd, Drobný, Hart, Kramer, Marble, Palfrey Cooke, Patty, Riggs, Schroeder, Sedgman

1950s

14	Hart

8	Seixas

7	Sedgman

5	Coyne Long

4	Osborne duPont

3	Fraser, Hard, Worthington

2	Hartwig, Howe

1	Anderson, Ayala, Bevis Hawton, Bloomer Brasher, Brough Clapp, Coghlan Robinson, Connoly Brinker, Forbes, Fry Irvin, Gibson, Hoad, Javorský, Knight, Laver, Mark, McGregor, Morea, Muller, Nielsen, Penrose Collier, Pietrangeli, Puzejova Suková, Ramírez Ochoa, Reynolds Price, Rose, Rosewall, Sampson Hayward, Scofield, Sturgess

1960s

18	Court

10	Fletcher

7	Stolle

6	Davidson

4	B. J. King, Turner Bowrey

3	Riessen

2	Fraser, Hard, Haydon-Jones, Howe, Laver, Lehane O'Neill, Newcombe, Osborne duPont

1	Barclay, Bueno, Crealy, Curtis, Durr, Ebbern, Eisel, Fancutt, Floyd Fales, Hewitt, Mark, McMillan, Roche, Schuurman Haygarth, Tegart-Dalton, Van Zyl

1970s

7	B. J. King

5	Davidson, Hewitt

3	Casals, Court, Dürr, McMillan, Riessen, Stevens, Stöve

2	Barclay, Năstase, Warwick

1	Bonicelli, Carillo, Dent, Goolagong Cawley, Kloss, Koch, Masters, McEnroe, Molina, Navratilova, Roche, Složil, Stockton, Teeguarden, Tomanová, Turnbull

1980s

5	Smith

4	Navratilova, Novotná, Pugh, Turnbull

3	Curren, Lloyd

2	Flach, Garrison, Günthardt, K. Jordan, Sánchez, Stewart

1	Arias, J. Austin, T. Austin, Bates, Bollegraf, Cannon, Casal, Durie, Fitzgerald, Gullikson, Jaeger, B. Jordan, Lozano, Maleeva Fragniere, Martin, McMillan, McNamee, McNeil, Nijssen, Reggi, Riessen, Sayers Smylie, Shriver, Stockton, Stöve, Teltscher, White

1990s

5	Suková, Woodbridge, Woodforde

4	Leach, Savchenko Neiland, Suk

3	Bollegraf, Sánchez Vicario

2	Bhupathi, Galbraith, Gimelstob, Mirnyi, Navratilova, Olhovskiy, Provis, Raymond, Sayers Smylie, S. Williams, V. Williams, Zvereva

1	Adams, Bates, Boogert, de Swardt, Durie, Fitzgerald, Frana, Garrison, Hiraki, Lozano, Lucena, Maniokova, McGrath, Nijssen, Norval, Oosting, Paes, Pugh, Reinach, Srebotnik, Stark, Sugiyama, Tarabini

2000s

6	B. Bryan

5	Bhupathi

4	Hantuchová

3	C. Black, Navratilova, Paes, Zimonjić

2	Azarenka, W. Black, M. Bryan, Likhovtseva, Palmer, A. Ram, Raymond, Srebotnik, Stosur, Stubbs, Zvonareva

1	Adams, Bovina, Carbonell, de Swardt, Dechy, Draper, Ferreira, Friedl, Gasquet, Golovin, Grönefeld, Gullickson, Hingis, Huber, Janković, D. Johnson, Knowles, Mirnyi, Mirza, Morariu, Murray, Nestor, Parrott, Pierce, Po-Messerli, Ruano Pascual, Sánchez Vicario, Santoro, Sun, Ullyett, Woodbridge

2010s

6	Hingis, Paes

4	Mattek-Sands, Murray

3	Chan, Dodig, Nestor, Soares

2	C. Black, M. Bryan, Dabrowski, Mirza, Mladenovic, Pavić, Srebotnik, Zimonjić

1	Benešová, Bhupathi, Bopanna, B. Bryan, Cabal, Čermák, Dellacqua, Ebden, Gajdošová, Grönefeld, Hlaváčková, Hradecká, Huber, Kontinen, Krejčíková, Lipsky, Makarova, Melichar, Melzer, Mirnyi, Oudin, Peya, R. Ram, Raymond, Rojer, Siegemund, Sock, Spears, Stosur, Tecău, Vesnina, Watson

2020s

4	Errani, Krawczyk, Vavassori

3	Peers

2	Gadecki, Hsieh, Krejčíková, Salisbury, Skupski, Zieliński

1	Arévalo, Danilina, Dodig, Heliövaara, Kato, Kichenok, Koolhof, Matos, Mektić, Menšík, Mladenovic, Muchová, Ostapenko, Pavić, Pütz, R. Ram, Roger-Vasselin, Sanders, Shibahara, Siegemund, Siniaková, Stefani, Verbeek

== Grand Slam titles by country ==
Note: Titles, won by a team of players from same country, count as one title, not two.

=== All-time ===
as of 2026 US Open.

207	United States (129 players)

139	Australia (69 players)

44	Great Britain (26 players)

30	South Africa (18 players)

29	France (19 players)

23	Czechoslovakia / Czech Republic (18 players)

20	India (4 players)

12	Netherlands (8 players)

10	Soviet Union / Russia (8 players), Spain (6 players), Switzerland (3 players)

8	Croatia (3 players)

7	Germany (6 players), Yugoslavia / Serbia and Montenegro / Serbia (3 players)

6	Belarus (3 players), Brazil (5 players), Canada (2 players), Italy (4 players), Zimbabwe (3 players)

5	Chinese Taipei (2 players), Japan (5 players), Latvia (2 players), Slovenia (1 player)

4	Slovakia (1 player)

3	Mexico (2 players), Romania (2 players)

2	Argentina (3 players), Austria (2 players), Colombia (2 players), Finland (2 players), Israel (1 player), Poland (1 player)

1	Bahamas, Bulgaria, Chile, China, Denmark, El Salvador, Kazakhstan, Norway, Ukraine, Uruguay

=== Open Era ===
as of 2026 US Open.

90	United States (53 players)

47	Australia (25 players)

21	Czechoslovakia / Czech Republic (15 players)

20	India (4 players)

18	Great Britain (9 players), South Africa (10 players)

12	France (9 players), Netherlands (8 players)

10	Soviet Union / Russia (8 players)

9	Switzerland (2 players)

8	Croatia (3 players), Spain (5 players)

6	Belarus (3 players), Canada (2 players), Serbia and Montenegro / Serbia (2 players), Zimbabwe (3 players)

5	Brazil (4 players), Chinese Taipei (2 players), Germany (3 players), Italy (3 players), Latvia (2 players), Slovenia (1 player)

4	Japan (4 players), Slovakia (1 player)

3	Romania (2 players)

2	Austria (2 players), Colombia (2 players), Finland (2 players), Israel (1 player), Mexico (1 player), Poland (1 player)

1	Argentina (2 players), Bahamas, Bulgaria, China, El Salvador, Kazakhstan, Ukraine, Uruguay

== See also ==
- Grand Slam (tennis)
- List of Grand Slam–related tennis records
- List of Grand Slam men's singles champions
- List of Grand Slam women's singles champions
- List of Grand Slam men's doubles champions
- List of Grand Slam women's doubles champions
