= 1892 in sports =

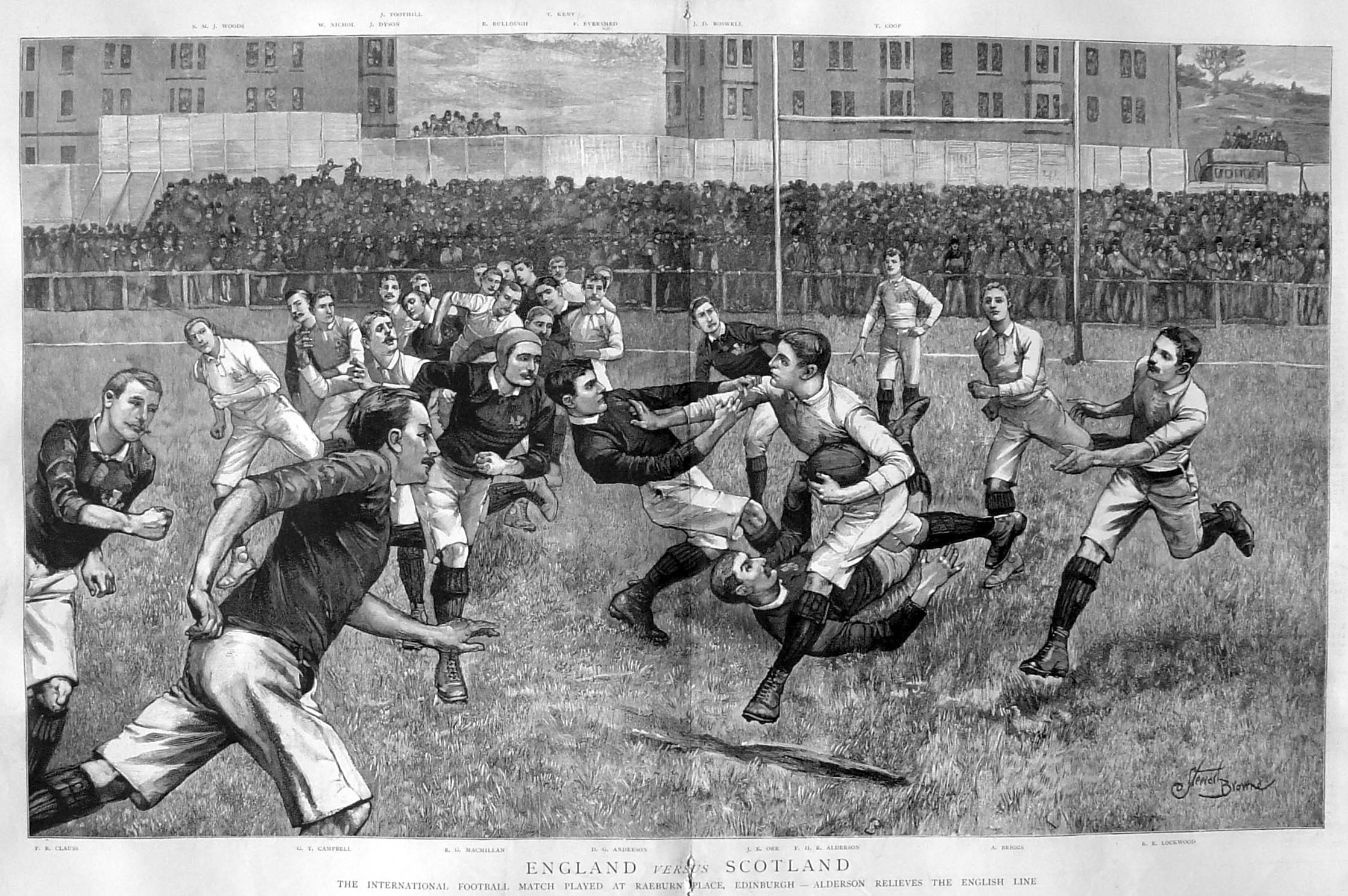
Rugby football – England plays Scotland for the Calcutta Cup in 1892

1892 in sports describes the year's events in world sport.

== American football ==
College championship

- College football national championship – Yale Bulldogs

Non-college amateur championships

- Western Pennsylvania champions – Allegheny Athletic Association

Events

- September 28 – The first night football game is attempted between Wyoming Seminary and Mansfield State.
- 12 November – Pudge Heffelfinger is paid $500 by the Allegheny Athletic Association to play in a game against the Pittsburgh Athletic Club. He is considered the first professional football player of all time.

== Association football ==
Bohemia

- SK Slavia Prague was founded in Czechoslovakia

England

- The Football League – Sunderland 42 points, Preston North End 37, Bolton Wanderers 36, Aston Villa 30, Everton 28, Wolves 26
- FA Cup final – West Bromwich Albion 3–0 Aston Villa in the last final to be played at The Oval.
- 13 March — Liverpool Football Club is founded after Everton is split by a faction fight at board level over the proposed purchase of the freehold at Anfield. One faction, retaining the club's name and players, quits Anfield and moves across Stanley Park to establish a new home at Goodison Park. The other faction, which owns Anfield, decides to establish a new club there and this is called Liverpool F.C.. The new club joins the Lancashire League prior to the 1892–1893 season.
- With the demise of the rival Football Alliance, the Football League is able to expand by inviting former Alliance members to join it. Membership doubles from 14 to 28 clubs with divisions introduced for the first time in the 1892–93 season. The original Football League becomes the new First Division, expanded to 16 teams; and the new Second Division is formed with 12 teams, many of them former members of the Alliance.
- Darwen is relegated from the First Division; Newton Heath (Manchester United), Nottingham Forest and Sheffield Wednesday are elected to the First Division for 1892–93. Members of the new Second Division are Ardwick (Manchester City), Bootle (league members 1892–93), Burton United (1892–1907), Crewe Alexandra, Darwen, Grimsby Town, Lincoln City, Northwich Victoria (1892–94), Burslem Port Vale (1892–1907), Sheffield United, Small Heath (Birmingham City) and Walsall.

Germany

- July 25 — Hertha Berlin founded as one of the oldest clubs in Germany

Nederland

- May 14 — Dutch professional football club SBV Vitesse founded in Arnhem

Scotland

- Scottish Football League – Dumbarton
- Scottish Cup final – Celtic 5–1 Queen's Park at Ibrox Park
- The SFL is reduced to 10 teams for 1892–93 after Cambuslang and Vale of Leven are expelled.

== Athletics ==
Events

- C. B. Fry equals the world record for the long jump of 23 ft. 5in – the record stands for 18 months.
- USA Outdoor Track and Field Championships

== Australian Rules Football ==
- Victorian Football Association premiers - Essendon
- SANFL premiers - South Adelaide
- WAFL premiers - Fremantle

== Baseball ==
National championship

- The "National League and American Association" is the sole major league in baseball after incorporating four clubs from the former American Association into the expanded and restructured National League and buying out the four others.
- The National League plays a split season, Boston Beaneaters winning the first half, Cleveland Spiders winning the second. At the end of the season, Boston defeats Cleveland 5–0 in a championship series. The experiment will not be repeated but it will be adapted after two-month interruption of the 1981 season.

== Basketball ==
Events

- January 15 – James Naismith's rules for basketball are published for the first time in the Springfield YMCA International Training School's newspaper, in an article titled "A New Game." They said it was called "Basketball."
- March 11 – First basketball game played in public, between students and faculty at the Springfield YMCA. The final score was 5–1 in favor of the students, with the only goal for the faculty being scored by Amos Alonzo Stagg. A crowd of 200 spectators watched the game.

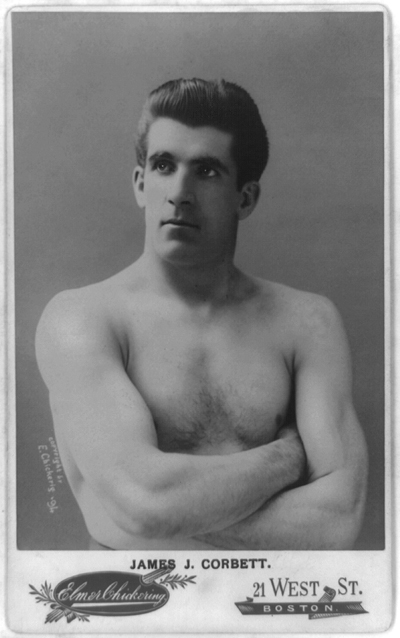
James J. Corbett, known as "Gentleman Jim"

== Boxing ==
Events

- 7 September — James J. Corbett wins the World Heavyweight Championship with a 21st-round knockout of John L. Sullivan at the Olympic Club in New Orleans. Sullivan is gradually worn down by Corbett's combination of elusive footwork and fast jabs. Corbett holds the title until 1897.

Lineal world champions

- World Heavyweight Championship – John L. Sullivan → James J. Corbett
- World Middleweight Championship – Bob Fitzsimmons
- World Welterweight Championship – vacant → "Mysterious" Billy Smith
- World Lightweight Championship – Jack McAuliffe
- World Featherweight Championship – George Dixon

== Canadian Football ==
- The Manitoba Rugby Football Union is founded. The first champion is St John's Rugby Football Club.
- Ontario Rugby Football Union - Osgoode Hall.
- Quebec Rugby Football Union - Montreal.
- Northwest Championship - Winnipeg.
- Dominion Championship - Osgoode Hall defeats Montreal 45–5.

== Cricket ==
Events

- The English cricket team in Australia in 1891–92 tours Australia and Ceylon. The team, captained by W G Grace, is organised by Lord Sheffield who later subscribes his Sheffield Shield to Australian domestic first-class cricket. 29 matches are played in total, of which 12 are won, two lost and 15 drawn. Eight of the games are first–class including three Tests versus Australia. Australia win the Test series 2–1 to claim The Ashes.
- Beginning of first-class cricket in India as the annual Bombay Presidency Matches between the Europeans and the Parsees are recognised as the inaugural first-class fixtures. Soon afterwards, the inaugural first-class tour of India by an overseas team takes place when Lord Hawke organises his 1892–93 English touring team.

England

- County Championship – Surrey
- Most runs – Herbie Hewett 1407 @ 35.17 (HS 201)
- Most wickets – J T Hearne 163 @ 15.39 (BB 9–41)
- Wisden Five Batsmen of the Year – Herbie Hewett, Lionel Palairet, Walter Read, Stanley Scott, Andrew Stoddart

Australia

- Most runs – Jack Lyons 557 @ 55.70 (HS 145)
- Most wickets – George Giffen 50 @ 17.30 (BB 9–96)

South Africa

- Currie Cup – Western Province

West Indies

- Inter-Colonial Tournament – not contested

== Golf ==
Major tournaments

- British Open – Harold Hilton

Other tournaments

- British Amateur – John Ball

== Horse racing ==
Events

- 11 May — African-American jockey Alonzo "Lonnie" Clayton, aged 15, becomes the youngest rider ever to win the Kentucky Derby

England

- Grand National – Father O'Flynn
- 1,000 Guineas Stakes – La Fleche
- 2,000 Guineas Stakes – Bona Vista
- The Derby – Sir Hugo
- The Oaks – La Fleche
- St. Leger Stakes – La Fleche

Australia

- Melbourne Cup – Glenloth

Canada

- Queen's Plate – O'Donohue

Ireland

- Irish Grand National – Springfield Maid
- Irish Derby Stakes – Roy Neil

USA

- Kentucky Derby – Azra
- Preakness Stakes – not run
- Belmont Stakes – Patron

== Ice hockey ==
- 10 January — Ottawa Hockey Club defeats the Montreal Hockey Club 4–3 to become Amateur Hockey Association of Canada (AHAC) champions
- 2 March — Ottawa Hockey Club wins its second consecutive Ontario Hockey Association (OHA) title, defeating Toronto Osgoode Hall 10–4.
- 7 March — Montreal Hockey Club defeats Ottawa 1–0 to regain the AHAC title for the fifth consecutive year.
- 18 March — At a celebration dinner to honour the Ottawa Hockey Club, Canadian Governor-General Lord Stanley announces his new trophy to be awarded to the ice hockey champions of Canada. Originally known as the "Dominion Hockey Challenge Cup", it becomes known as the Stanley Cup, the championship trophy of the National Hockey League (NHL).
- 11 November — The Manitoba Hockey Association is founded to organize ice hockey play in Manitoba.

== Ice skating ==
Events

- The International Skating Union, the world governing body for ice skating, is founded in the Netherlands.

== Rowing ==
The Boat Race

- 9 April — Oxford wins the 49th Oxford and Cambridge Boat Race

== Rugby football ==
- February 22 - A league that preceded the Canadian Football League Manitoba Rugby Football Union was founded

Home Nations Championship

- The 10th series is contested by England, Ireland, Scotland and Wales. England wins all its three games to take the title.

== Tennis ==
England

- Wimbledon Men's Singles Championship – Wilfred Baddeley (GB) defeats Joshua Pim (Ireland) 4–6 6–3 6–3 6–2
- Wimbledon Women's Singles Championship – Lottie Dod (GB) defeats Blanche Bingley Hillyard (GB) 6–1 6–1

France

- French Men's Singles Championship – Jean Schopfer (France) defeats Fassitt (GB) 6–2 1–6 6–2

USA

- American Men's Singles Championship – Oliver Campbell (USA) defeats Fred Hovey (USA) 7–5 3–6 6–3 7–5
- American Women's Singles Championship – Mabel Cahill (GB) defeats Elisabeth Moore (USA) 5–7 6–3 6–4 4–6 6–2
