= 1891 U.S. National Championships – Men's singles =

Men's singles
- 1891 U.S. National Championships

Final
- Champion: (United States) Oliver Campbell
- Runner-up: (United States) Clarence Hobart
- Score: 2–6, 7–5, 7–9, 6–1, 6–2

Events
Singles	men	women
Doubles	men	women
← 1890 ·	U.S. National Championships	· 1892 →

Defending champion Oliver Campbell defeated Clarence Hobart in the challenge round, 2–6, 7–5, 7–9, 6–1, 6–2 to win the men's singles tennis title at the 1891 U.S. National Championships.

== Draw ==
=== Challenge round ===
Challenge round
(United States) O Campbell	2	7	7	6	6
(United States) C Hobart	6	5	9	1	2

=== Finals ===
Semifinals
(United States) C Hobart	6	6	6
(United States) VG Hall	2	4	2
(United States) F Hovey	6	6	3	1	6
(United States) M Smith	4	2	6	6	4

Finals
(United States) C Hobart	6	3	6	6	6
(United States) F Hovey	4	6	4	8	0

=== Earlier rounds ===
==== Section 1 ====
First round
H Colby	6	4	6	6
EK Rowland	1	6	1	1
FLV Hoppin	w/	o
FJ Bentley
(United States) EL Hall	6	6	2	6
(United States) M Fielding	2	3	6	4
(United States) S McCormick	5	7	6	6
W Hoopes	7	5	1	2
WV Johnson	6	6	6
S Woodward	2	2	2
(United States) C Hobart	8	6	6
(United States) TP Borden	6	3	3
(United States) C Bunting	6	6	4	7	6
JA Hovey	4	8	6	5	4
(United States) J Ryerson	6	6	6
ML Pratt	2	3	3

Second round
H Colby	1	11	6	3	6
FLV Hoppin	6	9	4	6	3
(United States) EL Hall	5	7	6	6
(United States) S McCormick	7	5	1	2
WV Johnson	1	4	3
(United States) C Hobart	6	6	6
(United States) C Bunting	1	2	4
(United States) J Ryerson	6	6	6

Third round
H Colby	0	6	0	4
(United States) EL Hall	6	3	6	6
(United States) C Hobart	w/	o
(United States) J Ryerson

Quarterfinals
(United States) EL Hall	6	4	9	4
(United States) C Hobart	3	6	11	6

==== Section 2 ====
First round
(United States) CT Lee	6	6	6
H Satterlee	0	1	1
WP Jenks	6	6	9
JF Turrill	0	0	7
(United States) E Colby	11	4	6	7
BJ Carroll	9	6	3	5
(United States) W Larned	8	6	8
(United States) H McCormick	6	4	6
(United States) VG Hall	6	6	6
FM Pile	1	1	1
(United States) R Stevens	2	6	4	6	6
(United States) B Lamb	6	3	6	2	1
(United States) ST Chase	6	6	6
(United States) G Herrick	2	2	1
(United States) B Huntington	w/	o
R Johnson

Second round
(United States) CT Lee	6	6	6
WP Jenks	1	1	2
(United States) E Colby	1	1	1
(United States) W Larned	6	6	6
(United States) VG Hall	2	6	6	6
(United States) R Stevens	6	2	4	1
(United States) ST Chase	3	6	6	6
(United States) B Huntington	6	4	3	3

Third round
(United States) CT Lee	6	6	6
(United States) W Larned	2	2	4
(United States) VG Hall	6	2	6	6
(United States) ST Chase	4	6	2	3

Quarterfinals
(United States) CT Lee	4	4	6	0
(United States) VG Hall	6	6	0	6

==== Section 3 ====
First round
(United States) F Hovey	6	6	6
LR Parker	1	3	1
HG Bixby	6	6	6
(United States) J Nichols	4	4	1
(United States) PS Sears	5	6	6	10
(United States) D Miller	7	3	2	3
(United States) W Orcutt	6	10	6
(United States) EW Gould	3	8	1
H.I. Wilcox	6	2	6	6
(United States) WK Fowler	4	6	3	4
(United States) CR Budlong	3	6	6	6
ES Rushmore	6	4	3	2
(United States) AWS Post	6	6	6
(United States) GT Scott	3	3	2
(United States) GR Fearing	6	6	6
(United States) CA Brown	0	1	1

Second round
(United States) F Hovey	6	6	2	6
HG Bixby	3	4	6	4
(United States) PS Sears	6	6	2	7
(United States) W Orcutt	4	3	6	5
H.I. Wilcox	6	6	6
(United States) CR Budlong	4	2	2
(United States) AWS Post	6	6	4	6
(United States) GR Fearing	3	3	6	4

Third round
(United States) F Hovey	5	3	6	13	6
(United States) PS Sears	7	6	2	11	2
H.I. Wilcox	6	2	3	1
(United States) AWS Post	0	6	6	6

Quarterfinals
(United States) F Hovey	4	6	6	2	6
(United States) AWS Post	6	4	3	6	0

==== Section 4 ====
First round
(United States) M Smith	7	6	6
(United States) DW Candler	5	2	1
(United States) G Brown	6	6	8
(United States) BS de Garmendia	1	0	6
(United States) B O'Connor	6	7	8
GN Notion	0	5	6
PS Oscanyan	6	4	6	6
(United States) E Stille	2	6	4	3
(United States) T Horton	6	6	6
EA Thompson	2	2	2
(United States) J Clark	6	4	6	6
ES White	1	6	1	3
JHF Hunt	6	6	6
(United States) AWS Post	3	4	1
(United States) A Empie Wright	w/	o
WH Trotter

Second round
(United States) M Smith	6	6	6
(United States) G Brown	0	4	2
(United States) B O'Connor	6	6	6
PS Oscanyan	3	2	1
(United States) T Horton	0	1	3
(United States) J Clark	6	6	6
JHF Hunt	w/	o
(United States) A Empie Wright

Third round
(United States) M Smith	6	6	6
(United States) B O'Connor	2	2	3
(United States) J Clark	6	6	6
JHF Hunt	4	2	4

Quarterfinals
(United States) M Smith	6	6	6
(United States) J Clark	1	0	4

Preceded by 1891 Wimbledon Championships – Men's Singles	Grand Slam men's singles	Succeeded by 1892 Wimbledon Championships – Men's singles
