= 1892 U.S. National Championships (tennis) =

- Date: August 23–30 (M); June 21–25 (W)
- Edition: 12th
- Category: Grand Slam
- Surface: Grass
- Location: Philadelphia, PA (WS, WD, MX); Newport, R.I. (MS (MD))

Champions

Men's singles
- (United States) Oliver Campbell

Women's singles
- (Ireland) Mabel Cahill

Men's doubles
- (United States) Oliver Campbell / (United States) Bob Huntington

Women's doubles
- (Ireland) Mabel Cahill / (United States) Adeline McKinlay

Mixed doubles
- (Ireland) Mabel Cahill / (United States) Clarence Hobart
- U.S. National Championships

The 1892 U.S. National Championships (now known as the US Open) was a tennis tournament that took place in June and August of 1892. The women's tournament was held from June 21 to June 25 on the outdoor grass courts at the Philadelphia Cricket Club in Philadelphia, Pennsylvania. The men's tournament was held from August 23 to August 30 on the outdoor grass courts at the Newport Casino in Newport, Rhode Island. This tournament saw the introduction of the U.S. National Mixed Doubles Championship which was played, like the women's singles and women's doubles competition, at the Philadelphia Cricket Club. It was the 12th U.S. National Championships and the second Grand Slam tournament of the year.

== Finals ==
=== Men's singles ===
(United States) Oliver Campbell defeated (United States) Fred Hovey 7–5, 3–6, 6–3, 7–5

=== Women's singles ===
(Ireland) Mabel Cahill defeated (United States) Elisabeth Moore 5–7, 6–3, 6–4, 4–6, 6–2

=== Men's doubles ===
(United States) Oliver Campbell / (United States) Bob Huntington defeated (United States) Valentine Hall / (United States) Edward Hall 6–4, 6–2, 4–6, 6–3

=== Women's doubles ===
(Ireland) Mabel Cahill / (United States) Adeline McKinlay defeated (United States) Helen Day Harris / (United States) Amy Williams 6–1, 6–3

=== Mixed doubles ===
(Ireland) Mabel Cahill / (United States) Clarence Hobart defeated (United States) Elisabeth Moore / (United States) Rodmond V. Beach 6–3, 6–4

Preceded by 1892 Wimbledon Championships	Grand Slams	Succeeded by 1893 Wimbledon Championships
