= Gravel Hill Plantation (Hampton, South Carolina) =

Historic house in South Carolina, United States

- U.S. National Register of Historic Places
- Location within South Carolina Location within the United States
- Location: 3954 Augusta Stage Coach Rd, Garnett, South Carolina
- Coordinates: 32.63798°N 81.29702°W
- Area: 20 acres (8.1 ha)
- Built: c. 1910
- Built by: Huntington, Robert Palmer
- Architectural style: Shingle Style, Rustic Style
- NRHP reference No.: 10000240
- Added to NRHP: May 10, 2010

Gravel Hill Plantation is a historic hunting plantation complex located at Garnett, Hampton County, South Carolina. It was built in 1910, and is the 20-acre core of a large hunting plantation that includes eleven historic buildings; nine of them were designed and built by the owner, Robert Palmer Huntington. The complex includes three residential buildings, a kitchen and dining facility, ice house, stables and ancillary service buildings. Also on the property are a corn crib and a tenant's house. It is a rare example of the Adirondack or Rustic Style in South Carolina.

It was listed on the National Register of Historic Places in 2010.
