= 1891 U.S. National Championships (tennis) =

- Date: August 22 - August 31 (M); June 23 - June 27 (W)
- Edition: 11th
- Category: Grand Slam
- Surface: Grass
- Location: Newport, R.I., United States (M); Philadelphia, PA, United States (W)

Champions

Men's singles
- (United States) Oliver Campbell

Women's singles
- (Ireland) Mabel Cahill

Men's doubles
- (United States) Oliver Campbell / (United States) Bob Huntington

Women's doubles
- (Ireland) Mabel Cahill / (United States) Emma Leavitt Morgan
- U.S. National Championships

The 1891 U.S. National Championships (now known as the US Open) was a tennis tournament that took place in June and August of 1891. The women's tournament was held from June 23 to June 27 on the outdoor grass courts at the Philadelphia Cricket Club in Philadelphia, Pennsylvania. The men's tournament was held from August 22 to August 31 on the outdoor grass courts at the Newport Casino in Newport, Rhode Island. It was the 11th U.S. National Championships and the second Grand Slam tournament of the year.:

== Finals ==
=== Men's singles ===
(United States) Oliver Campbell defeated (United States) Clarence Hobart 2–6, 7–5, 7–9, 6–1, 6–2

=== Women's singles ===
(Ireland) Mabel Cahill defeated (United States) Ellen Roosevelt 6–4, 6–1, 4–6, 6–3

=== Men's doubles ===
(United States) Oliver Campbell / (United States) Bob Huntington defeated (United States) Valentine Hall / (United States) Clarence Hobart 6–3, 6–4, 8–6

=== Women's doubles ===
(Ireland) Mabel Cahill / (United States) Emma Leavitt Morgan defeated (United States) Grace Roosevelt / (United States) Ellen Roosevelt 2–6, 8–6, 6–4

=== Mixed doubles ===
(Ireland) Mabel Cahill / Wright defeated (United States) Grace Roosevelt / Lee 6–4, 6–0, 7–5 †

† - The Mixed Doubles event was not an official event in 1891

| Preceded by 1891 Wimbledon Championships | Grand Slams | Succeeded by 1892 Wimbledon Championships |
