= 1892 U.S. National Championships – Men's singles =

Men's singles
- 1892 U.S. National Championships

Final
- Champion: (United States) Oliver Campbell
- Runner-up: (United States) Fred Hovey
- Score: 7–5, 3–6, 6–3, 7–5

Events
Singles	men	women
Doubles	men	women
← 1891 ·	U.S. National Championships	· 1893 →

Two-time defending champion Oliver Campbell defeated Fred Hovey in the challenge round, 7–5, 3–6, 6–3, 7–5 to win the men's singles tennis title at the 1892 U.S. National Championships.

== Draw ==
=== Challenge round ===
Challenge round
(United States) O Campbell	7	3	6	7
(United States) F Hovey	5	6	3	5

=== Finals ===
Quarterfinals
(United States) R Wrenn	6	4	9	6
(United States) M Fielding	1	6	7	0
(United States) R Stevens	1	4	0
(United States) F Hovey	6	6	6
(United States) EL Hall	1	6	4	6	6
(United States) ST Chase	6	3	6	2	3
(United States) W Larned	6	6	7
(United States) VG Hall	4	3	5

Semifinals
(United States) R Wrenn	4	5	3
(United States) F Hovey	6	7	6
(United States) EL Hall	6	0	4	6	6
(United States) W Larned	3	6	6	1	8

Final
(United States) F Hovey	6	6	7
(United States) W Larned	0	2	5

=== Earlier rounds ===
==== Section 1 ====
First round

Second round
(United States) A Empie Wright	1	8	1
(United States) R Wrenn	6	10	6
(United States) M Chace	4	6	1	6	4
(United States) P Knapp	6	4	6	2	6
(United States) CR Budlong	3	6	2	8	6
(United States) J Clark	6	2	6	6	3
HD Betts	6	6	6
GH Pratt	4	2	3

Third round
(United States) R Wrenn	12	6	4	9	6
(United States) P Knapp	14	2	6	7	1
(United States) CR Budlong	6	6	6
HD Betts	1	4	2

Fourth round
(United States) R Wrenn	8	6	6
(United States) CR Budlong	6	4	1

==== Section 2 ====
First round

Second round
RM Thomas	6	6	5	6
(United States) GT Scott	4	2	7	4
(United States) M Fielding	6	6	6
ED Hewins	0	1	1
NH Emmons	4	7	7	2	6
CR Wyokoff	6	5	5	6	4
WV Johnson
(United States) G Herrick	w/	o

Third round
RM Thomas
(United States) M Fielding	w/	o
NH Emmons	5	3	1
(United States) G Herrick	7	6	6

Fourth round
(United States) M Fielding	2	3	6	7	6
(United States) G Herrick	6	6	2	5	2

==== Section 3 ====
First round

Second round
(United States) TP Borden	2	4	0
(United States) R Stevens	6	6	6
EK Rowland	2	1	3
(United States) H McCormick	6	6	6
(United States) W Ames	7	8	6
AN Winslow	5	6	4
(United States) BS de Garmendia
(United States) J Nichols	w/	o

Third round
(United States) R Stevens	6	4	7	6
(United States) H McCormick	0	6	5	1
(United States) W Ames	4	8	6	6
(United States) J Nichols	6	6	4	1

Fourth round
(United States) R Stevens	6	6	6
(United States) W Ames	1	1	2

==== Section 4 ====
First round
(United States) W McKittrick	7	6	6
EB Stevens	5	1	0
KS Green	9	6	6
HW Cozzens	7	4	1
(United States) AWS Post	6	6	8	3	6
HG Bixby	4	8	6	6	2

Second round
(United States) S Howland	6	6	1	6	4
(United States) A Codman	4	2	6	8	6
GS Bryan	1	1	2
(United States) F Hovey	6	6	6
HM Billings	6	6	6	6
(United States) W McKittrick	3	2	8	4
KS Green	1	0	1
(United States) AWS Post	6	6	6

Third round
(United States) A Codman	3	1	3
(United States) F Hovey	6	6	6
HM Billings	0	4	5
(United States) AWS Post	6	6	7

Fourth round
(United States) F Hovey	6	6	5	6
(United States) AWS Post	2	4	7	0

==== Section 5 ====
First round
BB Manchester	6	6	6
HH Pigott	4	4	3
(United States) T Horton	6	6	6
(United States) E Stille	4	1	1
(United States) EL Hall	w/	o
CE Lord

Second round
BB Manchester	5	3	1
(United States) T Horton	7	6	6
(United States) EL Hall	6	6	6
(United States) JC Davidson	2	4	4
(United States) C Hobart	6	6	6
GC Thomas	1	1	3
M Bruce	2	3	4
(United States) C Hubbard	6	6	6

Third round
(United States) T Horton	4	2	2
(United States) EL Hall	6	6	6
(United States) C Hobart	6	6	6
(United States) C Hubbard	1	1	2

Fourth round
(United States) EL Hall	8	4	4	6	6
(United States) C Hobart	6	6	6	2	3

==== Section 6 ====
First round

Second round
(United States) QA Shaw	6	6	6
GT Rice	0	4	4
(United States) ST Chase	7	11	4	6	6
(United States) DW Candler	5	13	6	2	2
(United States) M Smith	7	6	6
(United States) B Huntington	5	3	1
(United States) W Floyd	w/	o
(United States) A Thomson

Third round
(United States) QA Shaw	4	6	3
(United States) ST Chase	6	8	6
(United States) M Smith	6	6	7
(United States) W Floyd	2	1	5

Fourth round
(United States) ST Chase	7	5	6	2	6
(United States) M Smith	5	7	8	6	1

==== Section 7 ====
First round

Second round
(United States) H Slocum	6	6	6
(United States) J Ryerson	0	0	0
(United States) W Larned	7	6	6
(United States) GR Fearing	5	3	1
(United States) WH Barnes	w/	o
J Geer
WR Roberts	4	2	4
WD Goforth	6	6	6

Third round
(United States) H Slocum	1	3	6	4
(United States) W Larned	6	6	3	6
(United States) WH Barnes	3	4	1
WD Goforth	6	6	6

Fourth round
(United States) W Larned	6	6	6
WD Goforth	0	3	3

==== Section 8 ====
First round

Second round
(United States) VG Hall	6	3	8	6
(United States) PS Sears	3	6	6	4
(United States) C Tete	4	4	1
(United States) RN Dana	6	6	6
HE Woodworth	4	5	6
AB Emmons	6	7	10
(United States) WF Metcalfe	7	1	6	0
FB Winslow	5	6	8	6

Third round
(United States) VG Hall	6	6	6
(United States) RN Dana	3	2	2
AB Emmons	1	3	2
FB Winslow	6	6	6

Fourth round
(United States) VG Hall	6	6	6
FB Winslow	4	4	3

Preceded by 1892 Wimbledon Championships – Men's Singles	Grand Slam men's singles	Succeeded by 1893 Wimbledon Championships – Men's singles
