= Marmaduke Smith =

American tennis player

- Full name: Marmaduke Dudley Smith
- Country (sports): United States
- Born: 28 October 1868 Montgomery County, Pennsylvania, United States
- Died: 17 March 1935 (aged 66) Mahoning Township, Pennsylvania, United States.

Singles
- Career titles: 4

Grand Slam singles results
- US Open: SF (1891)

Marmaduke Dudley Smith (28 October 1868 – 17 March 1935) was an American tennis player active in the late 19th century.

== Tennis career ==
Smith reached the semifinals of the U.S. National Championships in 1891 (beating Joseph Clark before losing to Fred Hovey). Smith was a three time winner of the Pennsylvania Lawn Tennis Championships in 1894, 1896 and 1897. He also won the singles title at the Phildelpia and District Championships in September 1891.
