= Adeline McKinlay =

American tennis player

- Born: January 13, 1865; Dubuque, Iowa, U.S.
- Died: July 6, 1955 (aged 90); New York City, New York, U.S.
- Education: Vassar College
- Spouse: Horace Hatch (m. 1893)
- Tennis career

Doubles

Grand Slam doubles results
- US Open: 1st (1892)

Adeline "Addie" Maud McKinlay (January 13, 1868 in Dubuque - July 6, 1955 in New York City) was an American tennis player.

== Biography ==
Adeline McKinlay was born January 13, 1865 in Dubuque, Iowa. Her father was a Scottish immigrant, whose name was often mistaken for "McKinley." She graduated from Vassar College in 1888 and began training for the US Women's National Championship.

She notably won the US Women's National Championship in 1892 in women's doubles with Mabel Cahill. McKinlay went on to represent the New York Tennis Club. After settling in New York, she married Horace Hatch on 12 October 1893 in the First Baptist Church, Manhattan.

McKinley died on July 6, 1955 in New York City. She left a son and a daughter.

== Grand Slam doubles finals ==
Outcome	Year	Championship	Surface	Partner	Opponents	Score
Winner	1892	U.S. Championships	Grass	(United Kingdom) Mabel Cahill	(United States) Phyllis Walsh (United States) Grace Robert LeRoy	6–1, 6–3
