= 1891 U.S. National Championships – Women's singles =

Women's singles
- 1891 U.S. National Championships

Final
- Champion: (United Kingdom) Mabel Cahill
- Runner-up: (United States) Ellen Roosevelt
- Score: 6–4, 6–1, 4–6, 6–3

Details
- Draw: 8(+CR)
- Seeds: –

Events
Singles	men	women
Doubles	men	women
- U.S. National Championships

Mabel Cahill won the singles tennis title by defeating reigning champion Ellen Roosevelt 6–4, 6–1, 4–6, 6–3 in the Challenge Round of the 1891 U.S. Women's National Singles Championship. Cahill had won the right to challenge Ellen Roosevelt by defeating her sister Grace Roosevelt 6–3, 7–5 in the final of the All Comers' competition. The event was played on outdoor grass courts and held at the Philadelphia Cricket Club in Chestnut Hill, Philadelphia from June 23 through June 27, 1891.

The event is notable for its change from a best-of-three to a best-of-five format in the final round, a format that continued until 1901, excluding 1893. This was, and still is, unusual for a women's tournament, and was the only stretch of time where a best-of-five format was played at a women's grand slam event.

== Draw ==
=== Challenge round ===
Challenge Round
(United States) Ellen Roosevelt	4	1	6	3
(United Kingdom) Mabel Cahill	6	6	4	6

=== All Comers' finals ===
Preliminary Round
(United States) Helen Day Harris	5	6	6
(United States) Fannie K. Gregory	6	5	1

First round
(United States) Adelaide Clarkson	6	6
(United States) Emma Leavitt Morgan	0	0
(United States) Grace Roosevelt	3	6	6
(United States) Helen Day Harris	6	3	4
(United Kingdom) Mabel Cahill	6	6
(United States) Annabella Wistar	5	4
(United States) Lida Voorhees	4	6	6
(United States) Amy Williams	6	3	3

Semi-finals
(United States) Adelaide Clarkson	1	1
(United States) Grace Roosevelt	6	6
(United Kingdom) Mabel Cahill	6	6
(United States) Lida Voorhees	1	0

Final
(United States) Grace Roosevelt	3	5
(United Kingdom) Mabel Cahill	6	7

Preceded by 1891 Wimbledon Championships – Women's singles	Grand Slam women's singles	Succeeded by 1892 Wimbledon Championships – Women's singles
