= Edward L. Hall =

American tennis player

Edward Ludlow Hall, Jr.
- Country (sports): United States
- Born: March 17, 1872; New York City, New York
- Died: 1932 (aged 59–60)

Singles
- Career record: 77–29
- Career titles: 12
- Highest ranking: No. 6 (1893 U.S. ranking)

Grand Slam singles results
- US Open: SF (1892)

Doubles

Grand Slam doubles results
- US Open: F (1892)

Edward Ludlow Hall (March 17, 1872 – 1932) was an American tennis player who was active at the end of the 19th century. He was the son of Valentine Hall Jr. and an uncle of First Lady Eleanor Roosevelt. He was active from 1890 to 1930 and won 12 career singles titles.

== Career ==
He played his first tournament in 1887 at the New England Championships. He won his first singles title at the Montclair Open in 1890. In 1892 he reached the men's doubles final at the U.S. National Championships together with his elder brother Valentine Gill Hall III (1867—1934). They lost the final, played at the Philadelphia Cricket Club, to Oliver Campbell and Bob Huntington in four sets. Hall reached the semifinals in the singles and the quarterfinals the year before.

Together with his brother he won the National Eastern Doubles Championships in 1892. In July 1892 Eddie defeated his brother Valentine in the final of the Southampton Invitation in New York. In August 1892 Hall won the Nahant Invitation with eight victories and one defeat. Eddie also won the Southern Championships in 1891, 1892, and 1893, the Montclair Open in 1890 and the inaugural Longwood Challenge Bowl in 1891. In 1900 he won his final singles title at the New Jersey State Championships. In addition he was a two time losing finalist at the Kebo Valley Club Open in 1890 and 1892.

== Grand Slam finals ==
=== Doubles (1 runner-up) ===
Result	Year	Championship	Surface	Partner	Opponents	Score
Loss	1892	U.S. Championships	Grass	(United States) Valentine Hall	(United States) Oliver Campbell (United States) Bob Huntington	6–4, 6–2, 4–6, 6–3
