= Rodmond Beach =

American tennis player (1865–1898)

- Full name: Rodmond Vernon Beach
- Country (sports): United States
- Born: May 18, 1865 New Haven, Connecticut, United States
- Died: September 28, 1898 (aged 33) Ponce, Puerto Rico

Grand Slam mixed doubles results
- US Open: F (1892)

Rodmond Vernon Beach (May 18, 1865 – September 28, 1898) was an American tennis player.

Born in New Haven, Connecticut, Beach was the son of a lawyer and attended Yale Law School, which he graduated from in 1889. He had two brothers and one sister.

Beach was active in tennis during his youth and won an unofficial mixed doubles title at the 1890 U.S. National Championships, partnering Mabel Cahill. In 1892, Beach and Elisabeth Moore were the losing mixed doubles finalists.

During the Spanish–American War, Beach was posted to Puerto Rico with the 1st United States Volunteer Engineers to serve as a First Lieutenant and Adjutant. He died of typhoid fever in Ponce at the age of 33.

== Grand Slam finals ==
=== Mixed doubles (1 runner-up) ===
Result	Year	Championship	Surface	Partner	Opponents	Score
Loss	1892	U.S. Championships	Grass	(United States) Elisabeth Moore	(United States) Clarence Hobart (United Kingdom) Mabel Cahill	1–6, 3–6
