= 1892 U.S. National Championships – Women's singles =

Women's singles
- 1892 U.S. National Championships

Final
- Champion: (United Kingdom) Mabel Cahill
- Runner-up: (United States) Elisabeth Moore
- Score: 5–7, 6–3, 6–4, 4–6, 6–2

Details
- Draw: 8 + CR
- Seeds: –

Events
Singles	men	women
Doubles	men	women
- U.S. National Championships

Mabel Cahill won the singles tennis title by defeating challenger Elisabeth Moore, a 16-year old player from the Hohokus Valley Tennis Club, 5–7, 6–3, 6–4, 4–6, 6–2 in the Challenge Round of the 1892 U.S. Women's National Singles Championship. Moore had won the right to challenge Cahill by defeating Helen Day Harris 5–7, 6–1, 6–1 in the final of the All Comers' competition. The event was played on outdoor grass courts and held at the Philadelphia Cricket Club in Chestnut Hill, Philadelphia from June 21 through June 25, 1892.

== Draw ==
=== Challenge round ===
Challenge Round
(United Kingdom) Mabel Cahill	5	6	6	4	6
(United States) Elisabeth Moore	7	3	4	6	2

=== All Comers' finals ===
Preliminary Round
(United States) Harriet Butler	6	6
(United States) Amy Williams	2	1
(United States) Annabella Wistar	6	5	6
(United States) Ethel Bankson	2	7	2
(United States) Augusta Schultz	6	3	6
(United States) Elsie Donaldson	1	6	3

First round
(United States) Elisabeth Moore	6	6
(United States) Elisabeth Slevin	0	0
(United States) Harriet Butler	4	6	8
(United States) Annabella Wistar	6	2	6
(United States) Augusta Schultz	6	6
(United States) Josephine White	1	1
(United States) Helen Day Harris	6	4	6
(United States) Hattie Beaumont	2	6	2

Semi-finals
(United States) Elisabeth Moore	w/o
(United States) Annabella Wistar
(United States) Augusta Schultz	2	6
(United States) Helen Day Harris	6	8

Final
(United States) Elisabeth Moore	5	6	6
(United States) Helen Day Harris	7	1	1

Preceded by 1892 Wimbledon Championships – Women's singles	Grand Slam women's singles	Succeeded by 1893 Wimbledon Championships – Women's singles
