= Emma Leavitt-Morgan =

American tennis player and golfer

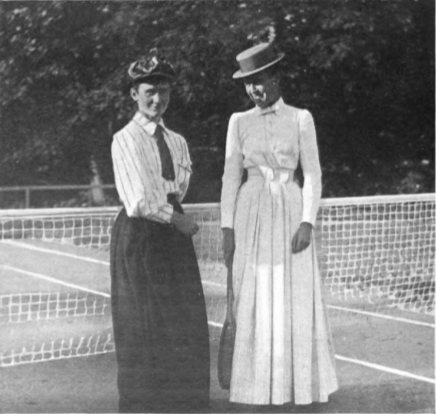
- Leavitt-Morgan (right) with Mabel Cahill
- Country (sports): United States
- Born: May 22, 1865; Great Barrington, Massachusetts, U.S.
- Died: December 29, 1956 (aged 91); New York, U.S.
- Plays: Left-handed

Doubles

Grand Slam doubles results
- US Open: W (1891)

Emma Leavitt-Morgan (née Leavitt; May 22, 1865 – December 29, 1956) was an American tennis and golf player, often listed as Mrs. W. Fellowes-Morgan.

== Biography ==
Mary Emma Leavitt was born in Great Barrington, Massachusetts, the daughter of Henry Sheldon Leavitt and Martha Ann Young Leavitt. She was married to William Fellowes Morgan, Sr. in 1885. They had three children. Their daughters were Polly and Beatrice. Their son was William Fellowes Morgan Jr.

She died in 1956, aged 91 years. Her gravesite is in Green-Wood Cemetery in Brooklyn, New York.

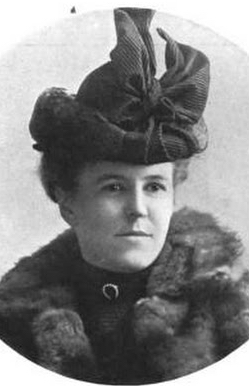
Emma Leavitt-Morgan, from a 1901 publication.

== Sports ==
With Mabel Cahill, Emma Leavitt-Morgan won, in 1891, the third women's doubles of the American National Championships, what is now the US Open. She was also a golfer, a member of the Baltusrol Golf Club.

== Grand Slam finals ==
=== Doubles (1 title) ===
Result	Year	Championship	Surface	Partner	Opponents	Score
Win	1891	US National Championships	Grass	(United Kingdom of Great Britain and Ireland) (Note: At this time, Ireland was part of the United Kingdom.) Mabel Cahill	(United States) Grace Roosevelt (United States) Ellen Roosevelt	2–6, 8–6, 6–4
