= Bob Huntington =

American tennis player (1869–1949)

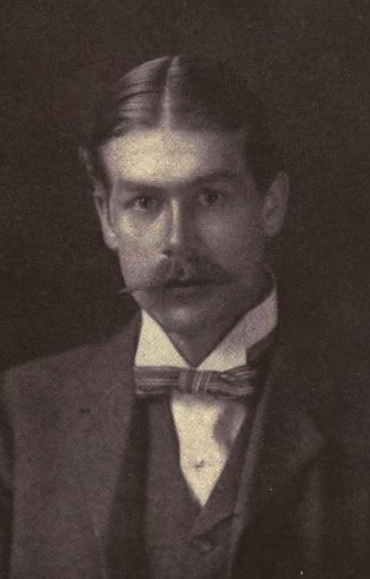
- Full name: Robert Palmer Huntington, Jr.
- Country (sports): United States
- Born: January 15, 1869 Louisville, Kentucky, U.S.
- Died: March 12, 1949 (aged 80) Poughkeepsie, New York, U.S.
- College: Yale University

Grand Slam singles results
- US Open: SF (1890, 1902)

Grand Slam doubles results
- US Open: W (1891, 1892)

Robert Palmer Huntington Jr. (January 15, 1869 – March 12, 1949) was an American tennis player. He was the grandson of New York born Indiana pioneer Judge Elisha Mills Huntington.

== Architectural career ==
Huntington joined the architectural firm of Hoppin & Koen, led by Francis L. V. Hoppin (1867–1941) and Terence A. Koen (1858–1923) after a period with J.P. Morgan & Co. He became a full partner in 1902, and they practiced together until he retired in 1908. The firm was based in Manhattan, New York and is known for police stations, fire stations and dignified town houses in the Beaux Arts Style. Huntington, who was independently wealthy, owned 300 acres on the Hudson River at Staatsburg, New York where he designed and built his residence, Hopeland House, a thirty-five room Tudor Revival mansion(demolished). In addition, he designed his own house in rural Hampton County, South Carolina; his house there at Gravel Hill Plantation, a National Register of Historic Places property, is his only known work south of New York.

== Tennis career ==
An 1891 graduate from Yale University, Huntington won the singles title at the New England Championships in 1890, and the intercollegiate tennis singles title in 1889.

In 1891 and 1892 he won the men's doubles title at the U.S. National Championships together with compatriot Oliver Campbell. In the singles tournament he reached the semifinals in 1890, losing to his doubles partner and eventual champion Oliver Campbell, and again more than a decade later in 1902, losing in four sets to Malcolm Whitman. Huntington also reached the quarterfinals in 1899 and 1903.

=== Grand Slam finals ===
==== Doubles (2 titles, 1 runner-up) ====
Result	Year	Championship	Surface	Partner	Opponents	Score
Win	1891	U.S. Championships	Grass	(United States) Oliver Campbell	(United States) Valentine Hall (United States) Clarence Hobart	6–3, 6–4, 8–6
Win	1892	U.S. Championships	Grass	(United States) Oliver Campbell	(United States) Edward L. Hall (United States) Valentine Hall	6–4, 6–2, 4–6, 6–3
Loss	1893	U.S. Championships	Grass	(United States) Oliver Campbell	(United States) Clarence Hobart (United States) Fred Hovey	3–6, 4–6, 6–4, 2–6
