= Mabel Cahill =

Irish tennis player

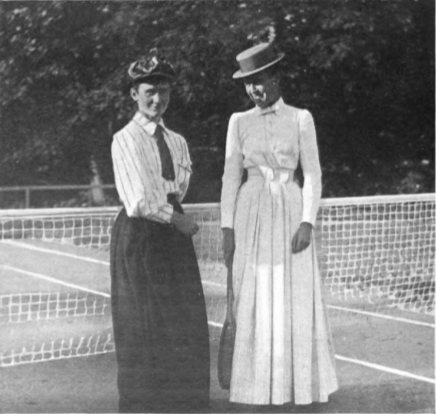
- Cahill (left) with Emma Leavitt-Morgan
- Full name: Mabel Esmonde Cahill
- Country (sports): United Kingdom of Great Britain and Ireland
- Born: 2 April 1863; Ballyragget, County Kilkenny, Ireland
- Died: 2 February 1905 (aged 41); Ormskirk, Lancashire, England
- Plays: Right-handed
- Int. Tennis HoF: 1976 (member page)

Singles

Grand Slam singles results
- US Open: W (1891, 1892)

Doubles

Grand Slam doubles results
- US Open: W (1891, 1892)

Grand Slam mixed doubles results
- US Open: W (1892) 1890, 1891 not official

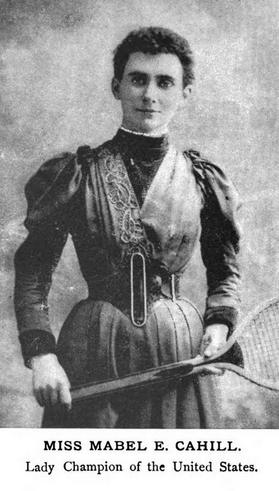
Mabel E. Cahill, from an 1892 publication.

Mabel Esmonde Cahill (2 April 1863 – 2 February 1905) was an Irish female tennis player, active in the late 19th century, and was the first foreign woman to win a major tennis tournament when she won the 1891 US National Championships.

== Early life and family ==
Mabel Cahill was born on 2 April 1863 in the family home of Ballyragget House, Ballyragget, County Kilkenny, the twelfth child of thirteen. She had 5 sisters and 7 brothers. Being part of this society resulted in having social events held by the upper class. In this case, tennis parties. During this time, it was quite uncommon for women to obtain a secondary level school degree; however, it has been recorded that Mabel attended Roscrea School with two of her brothers, a fee paying school. There is strong evidence to suggest that Mabel and two of her sisters enrolled in Sacred Heart Convent Secondary School.

After school, Mabel moved from her family town of Ballyraggett to the city of Dublin in the year of 1886. where she joined a lawn tennis club which sparked her love for the sport. Three years after moving to Dublin, Mabel decided to emigrate to America. She boarded the SS Arizona in Liverpool, and she took up residency in New York City at the age of 29.

== Career ==
Cahill won the Orange Club ladies championship in 1890 and 1891. Cahill became the first foreign woman to win a major tournament when she defeated Ellen Roosevelt in the 1891 US Championships women's final at the Philadelphia Cricket Club. She also won the Mixed Doubles event alongside M.R. Wright, though at the time this was not listed as an official event. She successfully defended her women's singles title in 1892 and also won the women's doubles title with Adeline McKinlay and the mixed doubles title with Clarence Hobart. She did not defend her titles in 1893.

Cahill also won multiple titles at other tournaments including the Middle States Championships ladies singles title four times consecutivley (1890–1893), the New Jersey State Championships (1890) held at South Orange, NJ, the Kilkenny County and City Tournament (1884, 1886) held at Kilkenny, Ireland

== Grand Slam finals ==
=== Singles (2 titles) ===
| Result | Year | Championship | Surface | Opponent | Score |
|---|---|---|---|---|---|
| Win | 1891 | U.S. Championships | Grass | (United States) Ellen Roosevelt | 6–4, 6–1, 4–6, 6–3 |
| Win | 1892 | U.S. Championships | Grass | (United States) Elisabeth Moore | 5–7, 6–3, 6–4, 4–6, 6–2 |

=== Doubles (2 titles) ===
| Result | Year | Championship | Surface | Partner | Opponents | Score |
|---|---|---|---|---|---|---|
| Win | 1891 | U.S. Championships | Grass | (United States) Emma Leavitt-Morgan | (United States) Ellen Roosevelt (United States) Grace Roosevelt | 2–6, 8–6, 6–4 |
| Win | 1892 | U.S. Championships | Grass | (United States) Adeline McKinlay | (United States) Helen Day Harris (United States) Amy Reeve Williams | 6–1, 6–3 |

=== Mixed doubles (1 title) ===
| Result | Year | Championship | Surface | Partner | Opponents | Score |
|---|---|---|---|---|---|---|
| Win | 1892 | U.S. Championships | Grass | (United States) Clarence Hobart | (United States) Elisabeth Moore (United States) Rodmond Beach | 6–1, 6–3 |

== Later life and death ==
Cahill also attempted to start a career as a writer during her time in America. She wrote a romantic novel called Her Playthings: Men which was published in 1891 but it was not successful. Her short stories Carved in marble and Purple Sparkling were not well received. In 1893 she contributed two articles to the Ladies' Home Journal, The art of playing good tennis and Arranging a tennis tournament. She performed as a chorus girl in music halls. Her later years were troubled, and she died on 2 February 1905 at the Ormskirk Union Workhouse. She was buried in Ormskirk on 6 February.

After her death in 1936, the Irish Lawn Tennis Association placed an advertisement in the national press asking that a representative of hers come forward to collect a gold medallion struck to honour her achievements in tennis in America. It is not known if the medallion was collected. In 1976, Cahill was inducted into the International Tennis Hall of Fame, where she is the only Irish representative.
