= 1899 in tennis =

This page covers all the important events in the sport of tennis in 1899. It provides the results of notable tournaments throughout the year on both the men's and women's ILTF tennis circuits.

== Australian Open ==
No event.

== French Open ==
Not a Grand Slam event.

== Wimbledon ==
Category	Champion(s)	Finalist(s)	Score
Men's singles	(United Kingdom) Reginald Doherty	(United Kingdom) Arthur Gore	1–6, 4–6, 6–3, 6–3, 6–3
Women's singles	(United Kingdom) Blanche Hillyard	(United Kingdom) Charlotte Cooper	6–2, 6–3
Men's doubles	(United Kingdom) Laurence Doherty (United Kingdom) Reginald Doherty	(United States) Clarence Hobart (United Kingdom) Harold Nisbet	7–5, 6–0, 6–2

== US Open ==
Category	Champion(s)	Finalist(s)	Score
Men's singles	(United States) Malcolm Whitman	(United States) J. Parmly Paret	6–1, 6–2, 3–6, 7–5
Women's singles	(United States) Marion Jones	(United States) Maud Banks	6–1, 6–1, 7–5
Men's doubles	(United States) Holcombe Ward (United States) Dwight Davis	(United States) Leo Ware (United States) George Sheldon	6–4, 6–4, 6–3
Women's doubles	(United States) Jane Craven (United States) Myrtle McAteer	(United States) Maud Banks (United States) Elizabeth Rastall	6–1, 6–1, 7–5
Mixed doubles	(United States) Elizabeth Rastall (United States) Albert Hoskins	(United States) Jane Craven (United States) James Gardner	6–4, 6–0, ret.
