= 1897 U.S. National Championships – Men's singles =

Men's singles
- 1897 U.S. National Championships

Final
- Champion: (United States) Robert Wrenn
- Runner-up: (United Kingdom) Wilberforce Eaves
- Score: 4–6, 8–6, 6–3, 2–6, 6–2

Events
Singles	men	women
Doubles	men	women
← 1896 ·	U.S. National Championships	· 1898 →

Defending champion Robert Wrenn defeated Wilberforce Eaves in the challenge round, 4–6, 8–6, 6–3, 2–6, 6–2 to win the men's singles tennis title at the 1897 U.S. National Championships. A delegation of British players, including reigning Wimbledon champion Eaves, competed at this year's U.S. championships.

== Draw ==
=== Challenge round ===
Challenge round
(United States) R Wrenn	4	8	6	2	6
(United Kingdom) W Eaves	6	6	3	6	2

=== Finals ===
Semifinals
(United Kingdom) H Nisbet	3	2	9	6	6
(United States) W Larned	6	6	7	4	4
(United Kingdom) W Eaves	6	6	6
(United States) LE Ware	0	2	4

Final
(United Kingdom) H Nisbet	5	3	2
(United Kingdom) W Eaves	7	6	6

=== Earlier rounds ===
==== Section 1 ====
First round
(United States) MD Whitman	6	6	6
(United States) W Clothier	3	0	0
(United Kingdom) H Mahony	6	6	6
(United States) E Stille	3	3	3
JC Goodfellow	6	6	6	6
(United States) TR Pell	3	8	2	2
JK Willing	w/	o
(United States) J Talmage
(United Kingdom) H Nisbet	2	6	6	6
(United States) H Hackett	6	4	3	4
(United States) J Ryerson	6	11	3	6
(United States) RD Little	3	9	6	3
(United States) BC Wright	6	6	6
(United States) P Marshall	0	1	1

Second round
FF Brooks
(United States) MD Whitman	w/	o
(United Kingdom) H Mahony	6	6	6
JC Goodfellow	4	0	1
JK Willing	3	2	4
(United Kingdom) H Nisbet	6	6	6
(United States) J Ryerson	2	4	6	7	3
(United States) BC Wright	6	6	3	5	6

Third round
(United States) MD Whitman	9	6	6
(United Kingdom) H Mahony	7	3	3
(United Kingdom) H Nisbet	6	6	6
(United States) BC Wright	3	4	3

Quarterfinals
(United States) MD Whitman	6	6	4	6	5
(United Kingdom) H Nisbet	8	4	6	3	7

==== Section 2 ====
First round
(United States) W Larned	6	6	6
(United States) AP Hawes	2	3	0
(United States) GL Wrenn	6	3	6	5	6
(United States) CP Dodge	3	6	3	7	3
J Forbes	6	6	6
ES White	3	4	2
(United States) P MacMahon	w/	o
(United States) D Miller
(United States) R Stevens	w/	o
(United States) M Chace
(United States) M Smith	6	7	6
(United States) R McKittrick	2	5	4
(United States) EP Fischer	6	6	6
(United States) CA Gould	1	4	3
(United States) WS Bond	6	6	6
(United States) AWS Post	1	3	1

Second round
(United States) W Larned	8	3	6	8
(United States) GL Wrenn	6	6	2	6
J Forbes	6	6	1	6
(United States) P MacMahon	1	3	6	0
(United States) R Stevens
(United States) M Smith	w/	o
(United States) EP Fischer	4	6	2	6	6
(United States) WS Bond	6	3	6	2	4

Third round
(United States) W Larned	6	6	6
J Forbes	3	1	4
(United States) M Smith	5	6	2
(United States) EP Fischer	7	8	6

Quarterfinals
(United States) W Larned	6	6	6
(United States) EP Fischer	4	1	3

==== Section 3 ====
First round
(United States) D Davis	1	6	6	6
(United States) R Hooker	6	1	4	4
(United States) E Wrenn	6	6	6
(United States) R Thurber	4	3	0
(United Kingdom) M Goodbody	w/	o
(United States) H McKittrick
(United States) J Parmly Paret	6	6	6
(United States) G Sheldon	0	0	3
(United Kingdom) W Eaves	6	6	6
FB Stevens	2	2	3
(United States) CR Budlong	6	6	6
(United States) WKAuchincloss	3	3	1
(United States) J Neely	4	6	6	2	6
(United States) T Gross	6	2	2	6	3
(United States) JC Davidson	6	6	6
(United States) H Avery	3	4	2

Second round
(United States) D Davis	5	2	0
(United States) E Wrenn	7	6	6
(United Kingdom) M Goodbody	4	4	0
(United States) J Parmly Paret	6	6	6
(United Kingdom) W Eaves	6	4	6	6
(United States) CR Budlong	4	6	0	3
(United States) J Neely	6	6	6
(United States) JC Davidson	2	4	2

Third round
(United States) E Wrenn	3	7	4	1
(United States) J Parmly Paret	6	5	6	6
(United Kingdom) W Eaves	7	6	6
(United States) J Neely	5	2	2

Quarterfinals
(United States) J Parmly Paret	4	1	6	3
(United Kingdom) W Eaves	6	6	3	6

==== Section 4 ====
First round
OM Bostwick	9	9	6
(United Kingdom) B Goodbody	7	7	3
(United States) H Ward	6	6	6
(United States) A Codman	3	3	4
WW Reece	2	6	5	6	10
(United States) H Plummer	6	4	7	4	8
GW Lee	6	6	6
(United States) WD Brownell	1	2	4
(United States) SA Cushman	6	6	6
(United States) R Proctor	1	2	1
(United States) LE Ware	6	6	6
EA Freshman	1	2	1
B Marshall	w/	o
(United States) K McEnroe

Second round
OM Bostwick	1	2	3
(United States) H Ward	6	6	6
WW Reece	4	1	r
GW Lee	6	6
(United States) SA Cushman	2	2	1
(United States) LE Ware	6	6	6
B Marshall
(United States) H Holt	w/	o

Third round
(United States) H Ward	6	4	6	6
GW Lee	4	6	4	4
(United States) LE Ware	6	6	6
(United States) H Holt	3	2	1

Quarterfinals
(United States) H Ward	3	4	4
(United States) LE Ware	6	6	6

Preceded by 1896 Wimbledon Championships – Men's Singles	Grand Slam men's singles	Succeeded by 1897 Wimbledon Championships – Men's singles
