= List of male singles tennis players =

This is a list of top international male singles tennis players, both past and present.

It includes players who have met one or more of the following criteria in singles:

- Officially ranked among the top 25 players by the Association of Tennis Professionals (since 1973)
- Ranked among the top 10 by an expert (e.g. A. Wallis Myers) before 1973
- Reached the quarterfinals of a Grand Slam tournament
- Reached the finals of year-end championships
- Won a medal at the Olympic Games

Players who have won at least one Grand Slam singles title or have been ranked world no. 1 in singles are in bold. Players who are still active on the tour are in italics.

== List ==
- Active players shown in italics

Name	Birth	Death	Nationality	HoF	Rank (Note: Highest rank achieved in career.)	Highest inclusion criteria
Robert Abdesselam	1920	2006	France			1949 French Championships quarterfinalist
José Acasuso	1982	–	Argentina		20	Ranking in 2006
András Ádám-Stolpa	1921	2010	Hungary			1947 French Championships quarterfinalist
**Andre Agassi**	1970	–	United States	2011	**1**	Winner of 8 Grand Slam titles and a **career Super Slam** completed in 1999 + 1 Olympic gold medal + 1 Year-End Championship → **1992 Wimbledon champion** • **1994/1999 US Open champion** • **1995/2000/2001/2003 Australian Open champion** • **1999 French Open champion** • **1996 Olympic gold medalist** • **1990 ATP Tour World Championships winner** • **Year-End No. 1** in 1999 • ranking **world no. 1** for 101 weeks
Ronald Agénor	1964	–	Haiti		22	1989 French Open quarterfinalist • ranking in 1989
Juan Aguilera	1962	–	Spain		7	Ranking in 1984
Karim Alami	1973	–	Morocco		25	Ranking in 2000
**Carlos Alcaraz**	2003	–	Spain		**1**	Winner of 7 Grand Slam titles and a career Grand Slam completed in 2026 → **2026 Australian Open champion** • **2022/2025 U.S. Open champion** • **2023/2024 Wimbledon Champion** • **2024/2025 French Open champion** • 2025 Tour Finals finalist • 2024 Olympic silver medalist • **Year-End No. 1** in 2022 and 2025 **• ranking world no. 1** **for 66 weeks** in 2022, 2023, 2025 and 2026.
Fred Alexander	1880	1969	United States	1961		Winner of 1 Grand Slam title → **1908 Australasian Championships winner (Now known as the Australian Open)**
John Alexander	1951	–	Australia		8	1977 (December) Australian Open semifinalist • ranking in 1975
Wilmer Allison	1904	1977	United States	1963	4	Winner of 1 Grand Slam title → **1935 United States champion**, 1934 finalist • 1930 Wimbledon finalist • ranking in 1932 and 1935
Nicolás Almagro	1985	–	Spain		9	2008/2010/2012 French Open quarterfinalist • 2013 Australian Open quarterfinalist • ranking in 2011
Manuel Alonso	1895	1984	Spain	1977	5	1921 Wimbledon semifinalist • rated world no. 5 in 1927
Felicisimo Ampon	1920	1997	Philippines			1952, 1953 French Championships quarterfinalist
Vijay Amritraj	1953	–	India	2024 (Note: Inducted into the 'contributor' category.)	16	1973 and 1981 Wimbledon quarterfinalist • 1973 and 1974 U.S. Open quarterfinalist • ranking in 1980
Mario Ančić	1984	–	Croatia		7	2004 Wimbledon semifinalist • ranking in 2006
**James Anderson**	1894	1973	Australia	2013	3	Winner of 3 Grand Slam titles → **1922, 1924 and 1925 Australasian champion** • rated world no. 3 in 1924 and 1925
Kevin Anderson	1986	–	South Africa		5	2018 Wimbledon finalist • 2017 US Open finalist • ranking in 2018
Mal Anderson	1935	2026	Australia	2000	2	Winner of 1 Grand Slam title → **1957 United States champion** • rated amateur world no. 2 in 1957 and 1958
Igor Andreev	1983	–	Russia		18	2007 French Open quarterfinalist • ranking in 2008
John Andrews	1952	–	United States			1975 French Open quarterfinalist
Matt Anger	1963	–	United States		23	Ranking in 1986
Paul Annacone	1963	–	United States		12	1984 Wimbledon quarterfinalist • Ranking in 1986
Hicham Arazi	1973	–	Morocco		22	1997 and 1998 French Open quarterfinalist • 2000 and 2004 Australian Open quarterfinalist • ranking in 2001
Jimmy Arias	1964	–	United States		5	1983 U.S. Open semifinalist • ranking in 1984
Matteo Arnaldi	2001		Italy			2026 French Open semifinalist
Jordi Arrese	1964	–	Spain		23	1992 Olympic silver medalist • ranking in 1991
József Asbóth	1917	1986	Hungary			Winner of 1 Grand Slam title → **1947 French champion** • 1948 Wimbledon semifinalist
**Arthur Ashe**	1943	1993	United States	1985	2	Winner of 3 Grand Slam titles → **1968 U.S. Open champion** • **1970 Australian Open champion** • **1975 Wimbledon champion** • ranking in 1975
Félix Auger-Aliassime	2000	–	Canada		4	2021/2025 U.S. Open semifinalist • 2022 Australian Open quarterfinalist • 2021/2026 Wimbledon quarterfinalist • 2026 French Open quarterfinalist • Ranking in 2026
Bunny Austin	1906	2000	(United Kingdom) Great Britain	1997	2	1932 and 1938 Wimbledon finalist • 1937 French finalist • amateur ranking in 1931
Luis Ayala	1932	2024	Chile		5	1958 and 1960 French finalist • ranking in 1958
**Wilfred Baddeley**	1872	1929	(United Kingdom) Great Britain	2013		Winner of 3 Grand Slam titles → **1891, 1892 and 1895 Wimbledon champion**, 1893, 1894 and 1896 runner-up
Sebastián Báez	2000	–	Argentina		18	Ranking in 2024
Marcos Baghdatis	1985	–	Cyprus		8	2006 Australian Open finalist • 2006 Wimbledon semifinalist • ranking in 2006
Corrado Barazzutti	1953	–	Italy		7	1977 U.S. Open semifinalist • 1978 French Open semifinalist • ranking in 1978
Herbert Roper Barrett	1873	1943	(United Kingdom) Great Britain			1908, 1909 and 1911 Wimbledon finalist
Pierre Barthès	1941	–	France			Ranked a world top-20 player for 1971
Nikoloz Basilashvili	1992	–	(Georgia (country)) Georgia		16	Ranking in 2019
Roberto Bautista Agut	1988	–	Spain		9	Ranking in 2020 • 2016 Olympics quarterfinals • 2019 Wimbledon semifinalist
Alfred Beamish	1879	1944	(United Kingdom) Great Britain			1912 Australasian championships finalist
**Boris Becker**	1967	–	West Germany/Germany	2003	**1**	Winner of 6 Grand Slam titles → **1985/1986/1989 Wimbledon champion** • **1989 U.S. Open champion** • **1991/1996 Australian Open champion** • 1988 Masters Grand Prix champion; 1992/1995 ATP Tour World champion • **ranking world no. 1 for 12 weeks** in 1991
Karl Behr	1885	1949	United States	1969		1906 U.S. Championship finalist
Mike Belkin	1945	–	Canada			1968 Australian Championships quarterfinalist
Alphonzo Bell	1875	1947	United States			1904 Olympic bronze medalist
Thomaz Bellucci	1987	–	Brazil		21	Ranking in 2010
Eduardo Bengoechea	1959	–	Argentina		21	Ranking in 1987
Julien Benneteau	1981	–	France		25	2006 French Open quarterfinalist • ranking in 2014
Alberto Berasategui	1973	–	Spain		7	1994 French Open finalist • ranking in 1994
Tomáš Berdych	1985	–	Czech Republic		4	2010 Wimbledon finalist • 2011 Tour Finals semifinalist • ranking in 2015
Lennart Bergelin	1925	2008	Sweden			1946/1948/1951 Wimbledon quarterfinalist
Jay Berger	1966	–	United States		7	1989 U.S. Open quarterfinalist • 1989 French Open quarterfinalist • ranking in 1990
Christian Bergström	1967	–	Sweden			1993 Australian Open quarterfinalist
Marcel Bernard	1914	1994	France			Winner of 1 Grand Slam title → 1946 **French Championships champion**
Matteo Berrettini	1996	–	Italy		6	2022 Australian Open semifinalist • 2021/2026 French Open quarterfinalist • 2021 Wimbledon finalist • 2019 U.S. Open semifinalist • Ranking in 2022
Paolo Bertolucci	1951	–	Italy		12	1973 French Open quarterfinalist • ranking in 1973
Henry Billington	1909	1980	(United Kingdom) Great Britain			1939 French Championships quarterfinalist
Jonas Björkman	1972	–	Sweden		4	1997 U.S. Open semifinalist • 2006 Wimbledon semifinalist • ranking in 1997
Byron Black	1969	–	Zimbabwe		22	1995 U.S. Open quarterfinalist • 2000 Wimbledon quarterfinalist • ranking in 1996
James Blake	1979	–	United States		4	2005/2006 U.S. Open quarterfinalist • 2008 Australian Open quarterfinalist • 2006 Tour Finals finalist • ranking in 2006
Galo Blanco	1976	–	Spain			1997 French Open quarterfinalist
Alexander Blockx	2005	–	Belgium			2026 U.S. Open quarterfinalist
Arnaud Boetsch	1969	–	France		12	Ranking in 1996
John Boland	1870	1958	(United Kingdom) Great Britain			1896 Olympic gold medalist
**Björn Borg**	1956	–	Sweden	1987	**1**	Winner of 11 Grand Slam titles → **1974/1975/1978/1979/1980/1981 French Open champion** • **1976/1977/1978/1979/1980 Wimbledon champion** • 1979/1980 Masters Grand Prix champion • **Year-End No. 1** in 1979 and 1980 • ranking **world no. 1** for 109 weeks → for 1 week in 1977, 32 in 1979, 49 in 1980 and 27 in 1981
**Jean Borotra**	1898	1994	France	1976	2	Winner of 5 Grand Slam titles → **1924 and 1931 French champion** • **1924 and 1926 Wimbledon champion** • **1928 Australian champion** • ranking in 1926
Jeff Borowiak	1949	–	United States		25	Ranking in 1977
William Bowrey	1943	–	Australia			Winner of 1 Grand Slam title → **1968 Australian champion**
Christian Boussus	1908	2003	France			1931 French Championships finalist, 1928 Wimbledon semifinalist
Jacques Brichant	1930	2011	Belgium			1958 French Championships semifinalist
**H. Briggs**			(United Kingdom) Great Britain			Won inaugural French championships in 1891
Godfrey Brinley	1864	1939	United States			1885 U.S. Championships finalist
**John Bromwich**	1918	1999	Australia	1984	2	Winner of 2 Grand Slam titles → **1939 and 1946 Australian champion** • ranking in 1939
**Norman Brookes**	1877	1968	Australia	1977		Winner of 3 Grand Slam titles → **1907 and 1914 Wimbledon champion** • **1911 Australasian champion**
Geoff Brown	1924	2001	(United Kingdom) Great Britain		3	1946 Wimbledon finalist • amateur ranking in 1946
Tom Brown	1922	2011	United States			1946 United States finalist • 1947 Wimbledon finalist
Jacques Brugnon	1895	1978	France	1976	9	1926 Wimbledon semifinalist • rated world no. 9 in 1927
**Sergi Bruguera**	1971	–	Spain		3	Winner of 2 Grand Slam titles → 1993/1994 **French Open champion** • 1996 Olympic silver medalist • ranking in 1994
Alexander Bublik	1997	–	Kazakhstan		10	2025 French Open quarterfinalist • Ranking in 2026
Butch Buchholz	1940	–	United States	2005	5	1960 U.S. National semifinalist • ranking in 1960
**Don Budge**	1915	2000	United States	1964	**1**	Winner of 6 Grand Slam titles → **1937 and 1938 Wimbledon champion** • **1937 and 1938 United States champion** • **1938 French champion** • **1938 Australian champion** • **rated amateur world no. 1 for 2 years**, 1937 through 1938
Darren Cahill	1965	–	Australia		22	Ranking in 1989 • 1988 U.S. Open semifinalist
**Oliver Campbell**	1871	1953	United States	1955		Winner of 3 Grand Slam titles → **1890, 1891 and 1892 United States champion**
Agustín Calleri	1976	–	Argentina		16	Ranking in 2003
Omar Camporese	1968	–	Italy		18	Ranking in 1992
Francesco Cancellotti	1963	–	Italy		21	Ranking in 1985
Guillermo Cañas	1977	–	Argentina		8	Ranking in 2005 ◌ 2002/2005/2007 French Open quarterfinalist
Cristiano Caratti	1970	–	Italy			1991 Australian Open quarterfinalist
George Caridia	1869	1937	(United Kingdom) Great Britain			1903 Wimbledon semifinalist • 1908 Olympic indoor silver medalist
Kent Carlsson	1968	–	Sweden		6	Ranking in 1988
Pablo Carreño Busta	1991	–	Spain		10	Ranking in 2017 • 2017/2020 U.S. Open semifinalist • 2020 Olympic bronze medalist
Ross Case	1951	–	Australia		13	Ranking in 1976 ◌ 1974 Australian Open semifinalist
**Pat Cash**	1965	–	Australia		4	Winner of 1 Grand Slam title → **1987 Wimbledon champion** • ranking in 1988
Marco Cecchinato	1992	–	Italy		16	2018 French Open semifinalist • ranking in 2019
František Cejnar	1917	1965	Czechoslovakia			1937, 1938 French Championships quarterfinalist • 1938 Wimbledon quarterfinalist
Francisco Cerundolo	1998	–	Argentina		18	Ranking in 2025
Malcolm Chace	1875	1955	United States	1961		1894 United States semifinalist
Thierry Champion	1966	–	France			1990 French Open quarterfinalist • 1991 Wimbledon quarterfinalist
**Michael Chang**	1972	–	United States	2008	2	Winner of 1 Grand Slam title → **1989 French Open champion** • ranking in 1996
Jérémy Chardy	1987	–	France		25	2013 Australian Open quarterfinalist • ranking in 2013
Juan Ignacio Chela	1979	–	Argentina		15	2004/2011 French Open quarterfinalist • 2007 US Open quarterfinalist • ranking in 2004
Andrei Cherkasov	1970	–	Soviet Union/Russia		13	1990 Australian Open quarterfinalist • 1990 U.S. Open quarterfinalist • 1992 Olympic bronze medalist • ranking in 1991
Andrei Chesnokov	1966	–	Soviet Union/Russia		9	1989 French Open semifinalist • ranking in 1991
Herbert Chipp	1850	1903	(United Kingdom) Great Britain			1884 Wimbledon semifinalist
**Marin Čilić**	1988	–	Croatia		3	**2014 U.S. Open champion** • 2017 Wimbledon finalist • 2018 Australian Open finalist • 2022 French Open semifinalist • 2010 Australian Open semifinalist • ranking in 2018
Clarence Clark	1859	1937	United States	1983		1882 U.S. Championship finalist
Joseph Clark	1861	1956	United States	1955		1885/1886/1887 U.S. Championship semifinalist
Francisco Clavet	1968	–	Spain		18	Ranking in 1992
Arnaud Clément	1977	–	France		10	2001 Australian Open finalist • ranking in 2001
José Luis Clerc	1958	–	Argentina		4	1981 and 1982 French Open semifinalist • ranking in 1981
William Clothier	1881	1962	United States	1956		Winner of 1 Grand Slam title → **1906 United States champion**
Flavio Cobolli	2002	–	Italy		6	2025 French Open finalist • 2025/2026 Wimbledon quarterfinalist • Ranking in 2026
**Henri Cochet**	1901	1987	France	1976	**1**	Winner of 7 Grand Slam titles → **1926, 1928, 1930 and 1932 French champion** • **1927 and 1929 Wimbledon champion** • **1928 United States champion** • 1924 Olympic silver medalist • **rated world no. 1 amateur for 3 years**, 1928 through 1930
**Jimmy Connors**	1952	–	United States	1998	**1**	Winner of 8 Grand Slam titles → **1974 Australian Open champion**, 1975 finalist • **1974 and 1982 Wimbledon champion** • **1974, 1976, 1978, 1982 and 1983 U.S. Open champion** • 1977 Masters Grand Prix champion • **Year-End No. 1** from 1974 to 1978 • **ranking world no. 1 for 268 weeks** → 22 weeks in 1974, 52 weeks in 1975, 52 weeks in 1976, 51 weeks in 1977, 52 weeks in 1978, 22 weeks in 1979, 8 weeks in 1982 and 9 weeks in 1983
Elwood Cooke	1913	2004	United States			1939 Wimbledon finalist
**Ashley Cooper**	1936	2020	Australia	1991	**1**	Winner of 4 Grand Slam titles → **1957 and 1958 Australian champion** • **1958 Wimbledon champion** • **1958 United States champion** • **amateur ranking no. 1** for 1957 and 1958
John Cooper	1946	–	Australia			1971 and 1972 Australian Open quarterfinalist
Patricio Cornejo	1944	–	Chile			1974 French Open quarterfinalist
Guillermo Coria	1982	–	Argentina		3	2004 French Open finalist • ranking in 2004
Borna Ćorić	1996	–	Croatia		12	2020 US Open quarterfinalist • ranking in 2018
Àlex Corretja	1974	–	Spain		2	1998/2001 French Open finalist • 1998 Masters champion • ranking in 1999
**Albert Costa**	1975	–	Spain		6	Winner of 1 Grand Slam title → **2002 French Open champion** • ranking in 2002
Carlos Costa	1968	–	Spain		10	Ranking in 1992
**Jim Courier**	1970	–	United States	2005	**1**	Winner of 4 Grand Slam titles → **1991 and 1992 French Open champion** • **1992 and 1993 Australian Open champion** • **Year-End No. 1** in 1992 • ranking **world no. 1** for 58 weeks in 1992
Mark Cox	1943	–	(United Kingdom) Great Britain		13	1971 Australian Open quarterfinalist • ranking in 1977
**Gottfried von Cramm**	1909	1976	/ Germany	1977		Winner of 2 Grand Slam titles → 1934/1936 **French champion**, 1935 finalist • 1935/1936/1937 Wimbledon finalist • 1937 U.S. finalist
**Jack Crawford**	1908	1991	Australia	1979	**1**	Winner of 6 Grand slam titles → **1931, 1932, 1933 and 1935 Australian champion** • **1933 French champion** • **1933 Wimbledon champion** • **amateur ranking**, 1933
Dick Crealy	1944	–	Australia			1970 Australian Open finalist
Gianni Cucelli	1916	1977	Italy			1947, 1948 and 1949 French Championships quarterfinalist
Pablo Cuevas	1986	–	Uruguay		19	Ranking in 2016
Kevin Curren	1958	–	South Africa/United States		5	1984 Australian Open finalist • 1985 Wimbledon finalist • ranking in 1985
Luciano Darderi	2002	–	Italy		16	Ranking in 2026
Alejandro Davidovich Fokina	1999	–	Spain		14	2021 French Open quarterfinalist • Ranking in 2025
Owen Davidson	1943	2023	Australia	2010	8	1966 Wimbledon semifinalist • ranking in 1967
Sven Davidson	1928	2008	Sweden	2007		Winner of 1 Grand slam title → **1957 French champion**
Dwight Davis	1879	1945	United States	1956		1898 United States finalist
Scott Davis	1962	–	United States		11	1984 Australian Open quarterfinalist • ranking in 1985
Franco Davín	1970	–	Argentina			1991 French Open quarterfinalist
Nikolay Davydenko	1981	–	Russia		3	2005/2007 French Open semifinalist • 2006/2007 U.S. Open semifinalist • 2009 Tour Finals champion • ranking in 2006
Max Decugis	1882	1978	France			1911, 1912 Wimbledon semifinalist • 1906 Olympic gold medalist (Intercalated Games)
Donald Dell	1938	–	United States	2009		1961 U.S. Championship quarterfinalist
**Juan Martín del Potro**	1988	–	Argentina		3	Winner of 1 Grand Slam title → **2009 U.S. Open champion** • 2009 Tour finals finalist • 2012 Olympic bronze medalist • 2016 Olympics silver medalist • ranking in 2018
Alex de Minaur	1999	–	Australia		5	2025/2026 Australian Open quarterfinalist • 2024 French Open quarterfinalist • 2024 Wimbledon quarterfinalist • 2020/2024/2025 US Open quarterfinalist • ranking in 2026
Phil Dent	1950	–	Australia		17	1974 Australian Open finalist • ranking in 1977
Taylor Dent	1981	–	United States		21	Ranking in 2005
Steve Denton	1956	–	United States		12	1981 and 1982 Australian Open finalist • ranking in 1983
Bernard Destremau	1917	2002	France			1937 French Championships semifinalist
Filip Dewulf	1972	–	Belgium			1997 French Open semifinalist
Colin Dibley	1944	–	Australia			1979 Australian Open semifinalist
Eddie Dibbs	1951	–	United States		5	1975 and 1976 French Open semifinalist • ranking in 1978
Mark Dickson	1959	–	United States			1983 U.S. Open quarterfinalist
Keith Diepraam	1942	–	South Africa			1965 Wimbledon quarterfinalist
Grigor Dimitrov	1991	–	Bulgaria		3	2014 Wimbledon semifinalist • 2017 Australian Open semifinalist • 2024 French Open quarterfinalist • 2019 US Open semifinalist • ranking in 2017 • 2017 **Tour Finals champion**
Charles P. Dixon	1873	1939	(United Kingdom) Great Britain		6	1901, 1911 Wimbledon finalist • 1912 Olympic indoor silver medalist • rated world no. 6 in 1913
Arnaud Di Pasquale	1979	–	France			2000 Olympic bronze medalist
**Novak Djokovic**	1987	–	Serbia		**1**	Winner of 24 Grand Slam titles including a triple Career Grand Slam in 2016, 2021 and 2023 → 2008/2011/2012/2013/2015/2016/2019/2020/2021/2023 **Australian Open champion (10)** • 2011/2014/2015/2018/2019/2021/2022 **Wimbledon champion (7)** • 2011/2015/2018/2023 **U.S. Open champion (4)** • 2016/2021/2023 **French Open champion (3)** • 2008/12/13/14/15/22/23 **Tour finals champion (7)** • **2024 Olympic gold medalist**, 2008 Olympic bronze medalist • **Year-End no. 1** in 2011, 2012, 2014, 2015, 2018, 2020, 2021 and 2023 • ranking **world no. 1** at a record of **428** weeks (2011–2024)
John Doeg	1908	1978	United States	1962		**1930 United States champion**
**Laurence Doherty**	1875	1919	(United Kingdom) Great Britain	1980		Winner of 6 Grand Slam titles and 1 Olympic gold medal → **1902, 1903, 1904, 1905 and 1906 Wimbledon champion** • **1903 United States champion** • **1900 Olympic gold medalist**
**Reginald Doherty**	1872	1910	(United Kingdom) Great Britain	1980		Winner of 4 Grand Slam titles → **1897, 1898, 1899 and 1900 Wimbledon champion** • 1902 United States runner-up • 1900 Olympic bronze medalist
Alexandr Dolgopolov	1988	–	Ukraine		13	2011 Australian Open quarterfinalist • ranking in 2012
Irvin Dorfman	1926	2006	United States			1950 French Championships quarterfinalist
Sláva Doseděl	1970	–	Czech Republic			1999 U.S. Open quarterfinalist
Stanley Doust	1879	1961	Australia			1913 Wimbledon finalist
Jack Draper	2001		(United Kingdom) Great Britain		4	Ranking in 2025 • 2024 U.S. Open semifinalist
Hendrik Dreekmann	1975	–	West Germany			1994 French Open quarterfinalist
Brad Drewett	1958	2013	Australia			1975 Australian Open quarterfinalist
**Jaroslav Drobný**	1921	2001	/Czechoslovakia/Egypt	1983		Winner of 3 Grand Slam titles → **1951 and 1952 French champion** • **1954 Wimbledon champion**
Cliff Drysdale	1941	–	South Africa	2013	13	1968 U.S. Open quarterfinalist • 1969 Wimbledon quarterfinalist • 1971 Australian Open quarterfinalist • ranking in 1974
Robin Drysdale	1952	–	(United Kingdom) Great Britain			1977 (December) Australian Open quarterfinalist
Pat DuPré	1954	–	United States		14	1979 Wimbledon semifinalist • ranking in 1980
**James Dwight**	1852	1917	United States	1955		1883 U.S. Championship finalist
Damir Džumhur	1992	–	Bosnia and Herzegovina		23	Ranking in 2018
Wilberforce Eaves	1867	1920	(United Kingdom) Great Britain			1895, 1896, 1897 Wimbledon finalist • 1897(Ch) U.S. Championships finalist • 1908 Olympic outdoor bronze medalist
**Stefan Edberg**	1966	–	Sweden	2004	**1**	Winner of 6 Grand Slam titles → **1985 and 1987 Australian Open champion** • **1988 and 1990 Wimbledon champion** • **1991 and 1992 U.S. Open champion** • 1989 Masters Grand Prix champion • 1988 Olympic bronze medalist • **Year-End No. 1** in 1990 and 1991 • **ranking no. 1 for 72 weeks** → 21 weeks in 1990, 40 in 1991 and 11 in 1992
**Mark Edmondson**	1954	–	Australia		15	Winner of 1 Grand slam title → **1976 Australian Open champion** • ranking in 1982
Kyle Edmund	1995	–	(United Kingdom) Great Britain		14	2018 Australian Open semifinalist • ranking in 2018
Younes El Aynaoui	1971	–	Morocco		14	2000 and 2003 Australian Open quarterfinalist • 2002 and 2003 U.S. Open quarterfinalist • ranking in 2003
Ismail El Shafei	1947	–	Egypt			1974 Wimbledon quarterfinalist
Jacco Eltingh	1970	–	Netherlands		19	1995 Australian Open quarterfinalist, 1995 Wimbledon quarterfinalist • ranking in 1995.
**Roy Emerson**	1936	–	Australia	1982	**1**	Winner of 12 Grand Slam titles → **1961, 1963, 1964, 1965, 1966 and 1967 Australian champion** • **1961 and 1964 United States champion** • **1963 and 1967 French champion** • **1964 and 1965 Wimbledon champion** • **ranking world no. 1 amateur for two years**, 1964 and 1965
Thomas Enqvist	1974	–	Sweden		4	1999 Australian Open finalist, 1996 quarterfinalist • 2001 Wimbledon quarterfinalist • ranking in 1999
Nicolas Escudé	1976	–	France		17	1998 Australian Open semifinalist • ranking in 2000
Lestocq Robert Erskine	1857	1916	(United Kingdom) Great Britain			1878 Wimbledon All Comers finalist
Christopher Eubanks	1996	–	United States			2023 Wimbledon quarterfinalist
Dan Evans	1990	–	(United Kingdom) Great Britain		21	Ranking in 2023
Kelly Evernden	1961	–	New Zealand			1987 Australian Open quarterfinalist
Brian Fairlie	1948	–	New Zealand		24	Ranking in 1973
Robert Falkenburg	1926	2022	United States	1974		Winner of 1 Grand Slam title → **1948 Wimbledon champion**
**Roger Federer**	1981	–	Switzerland		**1**	Winner of 20 Grand Slam titles and a **career Grand Slam** completed in 2009 ◌ **2003/2004/2005/2006/2007/2009/2012/2017 Wimbledon champion (8)** • **2004/2006/2007/2010/2017/2018 Australian Open champion (6)** • **2004/2005/2006/2007/2008 U.S. Open champion (5)** • **2009 French Open champion** • **2003/2004/2006/2007/2010/2011 Tour Finals champion (6)** • 2012 Olympics silver medalist • **Year-End No. 1** in between 2004 and 2007 and in 2009 • Ranking: **world no. 1 for 310 weeks** (2004–2018) of which 237 consecutive (also a record) (2004–2008)
Peter Feigl	1951	–	Austria			1978 Australian Open quarterfinalist
Wayne Ferreira	1971	–	/ South Africa		6	1992 and 2003 Australian Open semifinalist • ranking in 1995
David Ferrer	1982	–	Spain		3	2013 French Open finalist • 2007 Tour Finals finalist • ranking in 2013
**Juan Carlos Ferrero**	1980	–	Spain		**1**	Winner of 1 Grand Slam title → **2003 French Open champion** • 2002 Tour Finals finalist, 2001 semifinalist • **ranking world no. 1 for 8 weeks**, in 2003
Arthur Fery	2002		(United Kingdom) Great Britain			2026 Wimbledon semifinalist
Wojtek Fibak	1952	–	Poland		10	1977 and 1980 French Open quarterfinalist • 1980 Wimbledon quarterfinalist • 1980 U.S. Open quarterfinalist • ranking in 1977
Marcelo Filippini	1967	–	Uruguay			1999 French Open quarterfinalist
Jaime Fillol	1946	–	Chile		14	1975 U.S. Open quarterfinalist • ranking in 1974
Arthur Fils	2004	–	France		11	Ranking in 2026
Mardy Fish	1981	–	United States		7	2007 Australian Open quarterfinalist • 2008 U.S. Open quarterfinalist • 2011 Wimbledon quarterfinalist • 2004 Olympic single silver medalist • ranking in 2011
John Fitzgerald	1960	–	Australia		25	Ranking in 1988
Herbie Flam	1928	1980	United States		5	1950 United States finalist • 1957 French finalist • ranking in 1957
Peter Fleming	1955	–	United States		8	1980 Wimbledon quarterfinalist • ranking in 1980
Fabio Fognini	1987	–	Italy		9	2011 French Open quarterfinalist • ranking in 2019
João Fonseca	2006	–	Brazil		24	2026 French Open quarterfinalist • Ranking in 2025
Gordon Forbes	1934	2020	South Africa			1962 United States quarterfinalist
Guy Forget	1965	–	France		4	1991 and 1993 Australian Open quarterfinalist • 1991, 1992 and 1994 Wimbledon quarterfinalist • ranking in 1991
Željko Franulović	1947	–	(Socialist Federal Republic of Yugoslavia) Yugoslavia		8	1970 French Open finalist • ranking in 1991
**Neale Fraser**	1933	2024	Australia	1984	**1**	Winner of 3 Grand Slam titles → **1959 and 1960 United States champion** • **1960 Wimbledon champion** • **amateur No. 1 ranking**, 1959 and 1960
Rod Frawley	1952	–	Australia			1979 Australian Open quarterfinalist
Taylor Fritz	1997	–	United States		4	2024 Australian Open quarterfinalist • 2025 Wimbledon semifinalist • 2024 US Open finalist • 2024 Tour Finals finalist • Ranking in 2024
Frank Froehling	1942	2020	United States			1971 French Open semifinalist
Otto Froitzheim	1884	1962	Germany			1914 Wimbledon finalist • 1908 Olympic outdoor silver medalist
Richard Fromberg	1970	–	Australia		24	Ranking in 1990
Márton Fucsovics	1992	–	Hungary			2021 Wimbledon quarterfinalist
Renzo Furlan	1970	–	Italy		19	1995 French Open quarterfinalist • ranking in 1996
Jan-Michael Gambill	1977	–	United States		14	2004 Wimbledon quarterfinalist • ranking in 2001
Guillermo García López	1983	–	Spain		23	Ranking in 2011
Cristian Garín	1996	–	Chile		17	2022 Wimbledon quarterfinalist • Ranking in 2021
Chuck Garland	1898	1971	United States	1969		1919, 1920 Wimbledon semifinalist
Richard Gasquet	1986	–	France		7	2007 and 2015 Wimbledon semifinalist • 2013 US Open semifinalist • ranking in 2007
Andrea Gaudenzi	1973	–	Italy		18	Ranking in 1995
**Gastón Gaudio**	1978	–	Argentina		5	Winner of 1 Grand Slam title → **2004 French Open champion** • 2005 Tour Finals semifinalist • ranking in 2005
Maurice Germot	1882	1958	France			1914 Wimbledon quarterfinalist • 1906 Olympic silver medalist (Intercalated Games)
**Vitas Gerulaitis**	1954	1994	United States		3	Winner of 1 Grand Slam title → **1977(December) Australian Open champion** • 1979 and 1981 Masters Grand Prix finalist • ranking in 1978
Sam Giammalva	1934	–	United States			1955 U.S. Championships quarterfinalist
Sammy Giammalva Jr.	1963	–	United States			1982 Australian Open quarterfinalist
Bob Giltinan	1949	–	Australia		16	Ranking in 1974 ◌ 1977(December) Australian Open semifinalist
Robby Ginepri	1982	–	United States		15	Ranking in 2005 ◌ 2005 U.S. Open semifinalist
**Andrés Gimeno**	1938	2019	Spain	2009	10	Winner of one Grand Slam titles → 1972 **French champion** • ranking amateur in 1969
Juan Gisbert Sr.	1942	–	/ Spain			1968 Australian Championships finalist
Drew Gitlin	1958	–	United States			1982 Australian Open quarterfinalist
Brad Gilbert	1961	–	United States		4	Ranking in 1990 ◌ 1987 U.S. Open quarterfinalist • 1990 Wimbledon quarterfinalist • 1988 Olympics bronze medalist
Hans Gildemeister	1956	–	Chile		12	Ranking in 1980 ◌ 1978/1979/1980 French Open quarterfinalist
Shlomo Glickstein	1958	–	Israel		22	Ranking in 1982 ◌ 1981 Australian Open quarterfinalist
William Glyn	1860	1939	United States			1881 U.S. Championships finalist
André Gobert	1890	1951	France		3	1912 Wimbledon finalist • 1912 Olympic indoor gold medalist • rated world no. 3 in 1919
David Goffin	1990	–	Belgium		7	2016 French Open quarterfinalist • 2017 Australian Open quarterfinalist • 2019/2022 Wimbledon quarterfinalist • 2017 Tour Finals finalist • ranking in 2017
Dan Goldie	1963	–	United States			1989 Wimbledon quarterfinalist
Jérôme Golmard	1973	2017	France		22	Ranking in 1999
**Andrés Gómez**	1960	–	Ecuador		4	Winner of 1 Grand Slam title → **1990 French Open champion**, 1984, 1986 and 1987 quarterfinalist • 1984 Wimbledon quarterfinalist • 1984 U.S. Open quarterfinalist • ranking in 1990
**Pancho Gonzales**	1928	1995	United States	1968	**1**	Winner of 2 Grand Slam titles → **1948 and 1949 United States champion** • 1968 French Open semifinalist • 1968 U.S. Open quarterfinalist • **rated world no. 1 for 8 years**, 1952, 1954, 1955, 1956, 1957, 1958, 1959 and (as co-no.1) 1960
Fernando González	1980	–	Chile		5	2007 Australian Open finalist • 2008 Olympic silver medalist, 2004 bronze medalist • ranking in 2007
Vere St. Leger Goold	1853	1909	Ireland			1879 Wimbledon finalist
**Arthur Gore**	1868	1928	(United Kingdom) Great Britain	2006	**1**	Winner of 3 Grand Slam titles → **1900, 1901 and 1909 Wimbledon champion** • 1908 Olympic indoor gold medallist • rated world no. 1 in 1901
**Spencer Gore**	1850	1906	(United Kingdom) Great Britain			Winner of 1 Grand Slam title → **1877 Wimbledon champion**, 1878 finalist
Tom Gorman	1946	–	United States		8	1971 Wimbledon semifinalist • 1972 U.S. Open semifinalist • 1973 French Open semifinalist • ranking in 1973
Brian Gottfried	1952	–	United States		3	1977 French Open finalist • ranking in 1977
Georges Goven	1948	–	France			1970 French Open semifinalist
Clark Graebner	1943	–	United States		7	1967 United States finalist • ranking in 1968
Bryan Grant	1910	1986	United States	1972	6	1935 U.S. Open semifinalist • ranking in 1937
**Colin Gregory**	1903	1959	(United Kingdom) Great Britain			Winner of 1 Grand Slam title → **1929 Australian champion**
Seymour Greenberg	1920	2006	United States			1942, 1943, 1944, and 1945 U.S. National Championships quarterfinalist
Tallon Griekspoor	1996	–	Netherlands		21	Ranking in 2023
Clarence Griffin	1888	1973	United States	1970		1916 U.S. Championship semifinalist
Charles Walder Grinstead	1860	1930	(United Kingdom) Great Britain			Finalist in 1884 Wimbledon Championships – Gentlemen's singles
Sébastien Grosjean	1978	–	France		4	2001 Australian Open semifinalist • 2001 French Open semifinalist • 2003 and 2004 Wimbledon semifinalist • 2001 Tennis Masters Cup finalist • winner of 1 ATP Masters Series event • ranking in 2002
Ernests Gulbis	1988	–	Latvia		10	2014 French Open semifinalist• ranking in 2014
Tim Gullikson	1951	1996	United States		15	1979 Wimbledon quarterfinalist • ranking in 1979
Tom Gullikson	1951	–	United States			1982 U.S. Open quarterfinalist
István Gulyás	1931	2000	Hungary			1966 French finalist, 1971 quarterfinalist
Jan Gunnarsson	1962	–	Sweden		25	1989 Australian Open semifinalist • ranking in 1985
Heinz Günthardt	1959	–	Switzerland		22	1985 Wimbledon quarterfinalist • 1985 U.S. Open quarterfinalist • ranking in 1986
Magnus Gustafsson	1967	–	Sweden		10	1994 Australian Open quarterfinalist • ranking in 1991
Paul Haarhuis	1966	–	Netherlands		18	1991 U.S. Open quarterfinalist • ranking in 1995
Tommy Haas	1978	–	Germany		2	2000 Olympic silver medalist • 1999/2002/2007 Australian Open semifinalist • 2009 Wimbledon semifinalist • ranking in 2002
Harold Hackett	1878	1937	United States	1961		1906 United quarterfinalist
Frank Hadow	1855	1946	(United Kingdom) Great Britain			Winner of 1 Grand Slam title → **1878 Wimbledon champion**, 1879 runner-up
Edward L. Hall	1872	1932	United States			1892 U.S. Championships semifinalist
Valentine Hall	1867	1934	United States			1891 U.S. Championships semifinalist
Willoughby Hamilton	1864	1943	Ireland			Winner of 1 Grand Slam title → **1890 Wimbledon champion**, 1889 semifinalist
Victor Hănescu	1981	–	Romania			2005 French Open quarterfinalist
Charles Hare	1915	1996	(United Kingdom) Great Britain			1937 French Championships quarterfinalist, 1937 U.S. Championships quarterfinalist
Rodney Harmon	1961	–	United States			1982 U.S. Open quarterfinalist
Lloyd Harris	1997	–	South Africa			2021 U.S. Open quarterfinalist
**John Hartley**	1849	1935	(United Kingdom) Great Britain			Winner of 2 Grand Slam titles → **1879 and 1880 Wimbledon champion**, 1881 runner-up
John Hawkes	1899	1990	Australia			Winner of 1 Grand Slam title → 1926 **Australasian champion** • 1928 French Championships semifinalist
**Rodney Heath**	1884	1936	Australia			Winner of 2 Grand Slam titles → 1905/1910 Australian champion
Charles Heathcote	1841	1915	(United Kingdom) Great Britain			1877 Wimbledon All-Comers semifinalist
Henner Henkel	1915	1943	/ Germany			Winner of 1 Grand Slam title → 1937 **French champion** • 1938, 1939 Wimbledon semifinalist
Tim Henman	1974	–	(United Kingdom) Great Britain		4	1998, 1999, 2001 and 2002 Wimbledon semifinalist • 2004 French Open semifinalist • 2004 U.S. Open semifinalist • ranking in 2002
John Hennessey	1900	1981	United States		8	Ranking in 1927 and 1928
Bob Hewitt	1940	–	Australia/ South Africa		6	1960, 1962 and 1963 Australian semifinalist • ranking amateur, 1967
**Lleyton Hewitt**	1981	–	Australia	2022	**1**	Winner of 2 Grand Slam titles → **2001 U.S. Open champion** • **2002 Wimbledon champion** • 2001/2002 Tour Finals champion • **Year-End No. 1** in 2001 and 2002 • **ranking no. 1 for 80 weeks**
José Higueras	1953	–	Spain		6	1982 and 1983 French Open semifinalist, 1977 and 1979 quarterfinalist – ranking in 1983
Jakob Hlasek	1964	–	Switzerland		22	1991 French Open quarterfinalist • ranking in 1985
**Lew Hoad**	1934	1994	Australia	1980	**1**	Winner of 4 Grand Slam titles → **1956 and 1957 Wimbledon champion** • **1956 French champion** • **1956 Australian champion** • **ranking world no. 1 amateur for 2 years**, 1953, 1956. **ranking world no. 1 professional 1959 Ampol points**
Clarence Hobart	1870	1930	United States			1891, 1905 U.S. Championships finalist • 1898 Wimbledon semifinalist
Henrik Holm	1968	–	Sweden		17	Ranking in 1993
Ronald Holmberg	1938	–	United States		7	1959 U.S. Championships semifinalist • 1961 French Championships quarterfinalist • ranking in 1960
Greg Holmes	1963	–	United States		22	Ranking in 1985
Chip Hooper	1958	–	United States		17	Ranking in 1982
Harry Hopman	1906	1985	Australia	1978		1930, 1931 and 1932 Australian Championships finalist
Fred Hovey	1868	1945	United States	1974		**1895 United States champion**, 1896 finalist
Dominik Hrbatý	1978	–	Slovakia		12	1999 French Open semifinalist • ranking in 2004
Jiří Hřebec	1950	–	Czechoslovakia		25	Ranking in 1974
Pat Hughes	1902	1997	(United Kingdom) Great Britain			1931 French Championships semifinalist
Ugo Humbert	1998	–	France		13	Ranking in 2024
Joe Hunt	1919	1945	United States	1966		Winner of 1 Grand Slam title → **1943 U.S. champion**
Frank Hunter	1894	1981	United States	1961		1923 Wimbledon finalist • 1928 and 1929 United States finalist
Hubert Hurkacz	1997	–	Poland		6	2021 Wimbledon semifinalist • 2024 Australian Open quarterfinalist • ranking in 2024
John Isner	1985	–	United States		8	2018 Wimbledon semifinalist • 2011/2018 U.S. Open quarterfinalist • ranking in 2018
**Goran Ivanišević**	1971	–	(Socialist Federal Republic of Yugoslavia) Yugoslavia / Croatia	2020	2	Winner of 1 Grand Slam title → **2001 Wimbledon champion** • 1996 U.S. Open semifinalist • 1992 Olympic bronze medalist • ranking in 1994
Sydney Jacob	1879	1977	India			1925 French Championships semifinalist, 1925 Wimbledon quarterfinalist
Martín Jaite	1964	–	Argentina		10	1985 French Open quarterfinalist • ranking in 1990
Jerzy Janowicz	1990	–	Poland		14	2013 Wimbledon semifinalist • ranking in 2013
Nicolás Jarry	1995	–	Chile		16	Ranking in 2024
Anders Järryd	1961	–	Sweden		5	1985 Wimbledon semifinalist • ranking in 1985
François Jauffret	1942	–	France		20	1974 French Open semifinalist • 1966 French Championships semifinalist • ranking in 1974
Eric Jelen	1965	–	Germany		23	Ranking in 1986
Rafael Jódar	2006	–	Spain		11	2026 French Open quarterfinalist • Ranking in 2026
Joachim Johansson	1982	–	Sweden		9	2004 U.S. Open semifinalist • ranking in 2005
**Thomas Johansson**	1975	–	Sweden		7	Winner of 1 Grand Slam title → **2002 Australian Open champion** • 2005 Wimbledon semifinalist • 1998/2000 US Open quarterfinalist • ranking in 2002
Steve Johnson	1989	–	United States		21	Ranking in 2016 • 2016 Olympics quarterfinalist
**Bill Johnston**	1894	1946	United States	1958	**1**	Winner of 3 Grand Slam titles → **1915 and 1919 United States champion** • **1923 Wimbledon champion** (results incomplete as tournament drawsheets unavailable) • co-ranking **world no. 1 for 1919**
Boro Jovanović	1939	2023	(Socialist Federal Republic of Yugoslavia) Yugoslavia			1968 French Open quarterfinalist
**Yevgeny Kafelnikov**	1974	–	Russia	2019	**1**	Winner of 2 Grand Slam titles and 1 Olympic gold medal → **1996 French Open champion** • **1999 Australian Open champion** • **2000 Olympic gold medalist** • **ranking no. 1 for 6 weeks**, in 1999
Aslan Karatsev	1993	–	Russia		14	2021 Australian Open semifinalist • ranking in 2021
Bernd Karbacher	1968	–	West Germany		22	1996 French Open quarterfinalist • 1996 U.S. Open quarterfinalist • ranking in 1995
Ivo Karlović	1979	–	Croatia		14	2009 Wimbledon quarterfinalist • Ranking in 2008
Dimitrios Kasdaglis	1872	1931	Greece			1896 Olympic silver medalist
Béla von Kehrling	1891	1937	Hungary			1926/1929 French Championships quarterfinalist • 1929 Wimbledon quarterfinalist
Karen Khachanov	1996	–	Russia		8	2023 Australian Open semifinalist • 2019/2023 French Open quarterfinalist • 2021/2025 Wimbledon quarterfinalist • 2022/2026 U.S. Open semifinalist • 2020 Olympic silver medalist • Ranking in 2019
Nicolas Kiefer	1977	–	Germany		4	2006 Australian Open semifinalist • 1997 Wimbledon quarterfinalist • 2000 U.S. Open quarterfinalist • 1999 Tour Finals semifinalist • Ranking in 2000
Howard Kinsey	1899	1966	United States			1926 Wimbledon finalist
Algernon Kingscote	1888	1964	(United Kingdom) Great Britain			Winner of 1 Grand Slam title → **1919 Australian champion** • 1919 Wimbledon finalist
Vernon Kirby	1911	1994	South Africa			1934 U.S. Championships semifinalist • 1934 Wimbledon quarterfinalist
Harold Kitson	1874	1951	South Africa			1912 Olympic silver medalist
Martin Kližan	1989	–	Slovakia		24	Ranking in 2015
Percy Knapp	1863	1917	United States			1885, 1890 U.S. Championships finalist
Billy Knight	1935	–	(United Kingdom) Great Britain			1959 French quarterfinalist
Thomaz Koch	1945	–	Brazil		24	1969 French Open quarterfinalist • ranking in 1974
**Jan Kodeš**	1946	–	(Czech Republic) Czechoslovakia	1990		Winner of 3 Grand Slam titles → **1970 and 1971 French Open champion** • **1973 Wimbledon champion**
Philipp Kohlschreiber	1983	–	Germany		16	2012 Wimbledon quarterfinalist • ranking in 2012
**Petr Korda**	1968	–	Czechoslovakia / Czech Republic		2	Winner of 1 Grand Slam title → **1998 Australian Open champion** • ranking in 1998
Sebastian Korda	2000	–	United States		15	2023 Australian Open quarterfinalist • ranking in 2024
Stefan Koubek	1977	–	Austria		20	2002 Australian Open quarterfinalist • ranking in 2000
Jan Koželuh	1904	1979	Czechoslovakia			1926 and 1927 Wimbledon quarterfinalist
**Karel Koželuh**	1895	1950	Czechoslovakia	2006		**Rated professional world no. 1 for four years**, 1926, 1927, 1928 and 1929
**Richard Krajicek**	1971	–	Netherlands		4	Winner of 1 Grand Slam title → **1996 Wimbledon champion** • ranking in 1999
**Jack Kramer**	1921	2009	United States	1968	**1**	Winner of 3 Grand Slam titles → **1946 and 1947 United States champion** • **1947 Wimbledon champion** • **rated world no. 1 for 5 years** → 1947, 1948, 1949, 1950 and 1951
Oscar Kreuzer	1887	1968	Germany			1913 Wimbledon semifinalist • 1912 Olympic bronze medalist
Aaron Krickstein	1967	–	United States		6	1989 U.S. Open semifinalist • 1995 Australian Open semifinalist • ranking in 1990
**Johan Kriek**	1958	–	South Africa / United States		7	Winner of 2 Grand Slam titles → **1981 and 1982 Australian Open champion** • ranking in 1984
Ramanathan Krishnan	1937	–	India			1960 and 1961 Wimbledon semifinalist
Ramesh Krishnan	1961	–	India		23	1981 and 1987 U.S. Open quarterfinalist • 1986 Wimbledon quarterfinalist • ranking in 1985
Paul Kronk	1954	–	Australia			1978 Australian Open quarterfinalist
Łukasz Kubot	1982	–	Poland			2013 Wimbledon quarterfinalist
**Gustavo Kuerten**	1976	–	Brazil	2012	**1**	Winner of 3 Grand Slam titles → **1997/2000/2001 French Open champion** • 2000 Tennis Masters Cup champion • **Year-End No. 1** in 2000 • **ranking no. 1 for 43 weeks**in 2000–2001
Karol Kučera	1974	–	Slovakia		6	1998 Australian Open semifinalist • ranking in 1998
Patrik Kühnen	1966	–	(West Germany) Germany			1988 Wimbledon quarterfinalist
Nicklas Kulti	1971	–	Sweden			1992 French Open quarterfinalist
Ichiya Kumagae	1890	1968	Japan			1918 U.S. Championships semifinalist • 1920 Olympics silver medalist
Nick Kyrgios	1995	–	Australia		13	2022 Wimbledon finalist • 2022 U.S. Open quarterfinalist • 2015 Australian Open quarterfinalist • 2014 Wimbledon quarterfinalist • Ranking in 2016
**René Lacoste**	1904	1996	France	1976	**1**	Winner of 7 Grand Slam titles → **1925, 1927 and 1929 French champion**, 1926 and 1928 finalist • **1925 and 1928 Wimbledon champion**, 1924 finalist, 1927 semifinalist • **1926 and 1927 United States champion** • **rated world no. 1 for 2 years**
Dušan Lajović	1990	–	Serbia		23	Ranking in 2019
Nicolás Lapentti	1976	–	Ecuador		6	1999 Australian Open semifinalist • ranking in 1999
**William Larned**	1872	1926	United States	1956		Winner of 7 Grand Slam titles → **1901, 1902, 1907, 1908, 1909, 1910 and 1911 United States champion**, 1900 and 1903 finalist • **rated world no. 1 for 5 years** → 1901 and 1902 (co-rated), 1908, 1909 and 1910
Art Larsen	1925	2012	United States	1969		Winner of 1 Grand Slam title → **1950 United States champion**, 1954 finalist
Magnus Larsson	1970	–	Sweden		10	1994 French Open semifinalist • ranking in 1995
**Rod Laver**	1938	–	Australia	1981	**1**	Winner of 11 Grand Slam titles → **1960 and 1962 Australian champion**; **1969 Australian Open champion** • **1962 French champion**; **1969 French Open champion**, 1968 finalist • **1961, 1962, 1968 and 1969 Wimbledon champion** • **1962 United States champion**; **1969 U.S. Open champion** • 1970 Masters Grand Prix finalist • **rated world no. 1 for 7 years** → 1964 (co-rated), 1965, 1966, 1967, 1968, 1969 and 1970 (co-rated)
Herbert Lawford	1851	1925	(United Kingdom) Great Britain	2006		Winner of 1 Grand Slam title → **1887 Wimbledon champion**, 1880, 1884, 1885, 1886 and 1888 finalist, 1878, 1881 and 1882 and All-Comers semifinalist
Henri Leconte	1963	–	France		5	1988 French Open finalist • ranking in 1986
Harry Lee	1907	1998	(United Kingdom) Great Britain			1933 French Championships semifinalist
Jiří Lehečka	2001	–	(Czech Republic) Czechia		12	2023 Australian Open quarterfinalist • 2025 U.S. Open quarterfinalist • Ranking in 2026
**Ivan Lendl**	1960	–	(Czech Republic) Czechoslovakia/United States	2001	**1**	winner of 8 Grand Slam titles → **1984, 1986 and 1987 French Open champion** • **1985, 1986 and 1987 U.S. Open champion** • **1989 and 1990 Australian Open champion** • 1981, 1982, 1985, 1986 and 1987 Masters Grand Prix champion • **Year-End No. 1** in 1985, 1986, 1987 and 1989 • **ranking no. 1 for 270 weeks** → 17 weeks in 1983, 15 in 1984, 17 in 1985, 52 in 1986, 52 in 1987, 37 in 1988, 48 in 1989 and 32 in 1990
Edgar Leonard	1881	1948	United States			1904 U.S. Championship semifinalist • 1904 Olympic bronze medalist
Robert LeRoy	1885	1946	United States			1907 U.S. Championship finalist • 1904 Olympic silver medalist
Ernest Lewis	1867	1930	(United Kingdom) Great Britain			1886, 1888, 1892, 1894 Wimbledon finalist
Chris Lewis	1957	–	New Zealand		19	1983 Wimbledon finalist • ranking in 1979
Ivan Ljubičić	1979	–	Croatia		3	2006 French Open semifinalist • ranking in 2006
Michaël Llodra	1980	–	France		21	Ranking in 2011
John Lloyd	1954	–	(United Kingdom) Great Britain			1977 (December) Australian Open finalist
Feliciano López	1981	–	Spain		12	2005/2008/2011 Wimbledon quarterfinalist • 2015 US Open quarterfinalist • ranking in 2015
George Lott	1906	1991	United States	1964		1931 United States finalist
Gordon Lowe	1884	1972	(United Kingdom) Great Britain			Winner of 1 Grand Slam title → 1915 **Australian champion** • 1911, 1923 Wimbledon semifinalist
Yen-hsun Lu	1983	–	(Taiwan) Chinese Taipei			2010 Wimbledon quarterfinalist
Peter Lundgren	1965	–	Sweden		25	Ranking in 1987
Jan-Erik Lundqvist	1937	–	Sweden		3	1961, 1964 French Championships semifinalist • ranking in 1964
Bob Lutz	1949	–	United States		7	1970 Australian Open semifinalist • ranking in 1972
Randolph Lycett	1886	1935	(United Kingdom) Great Britain			1922 Wimbledon finalist, 1905 Australian semifinalist
George Lyttleton Rogers	1906	1963	(United Kingdom) Great Britain			1930, 1932 French Championships quarterfinalist
Tomáš Macháč	2000		(Czech Republic) Czechia		20	Ranking in 2025
Barry MacKay	1935	2012	United States			1959 Wimbledon semifinalist • 1959 Australian semifinalist
Harold Mahony	1867	1905	(United Kingdom) Great Britain			Winner of 1 Grand Slam title → **1896 Wimbledon champion** • 1900 Olympics silver medalist
Gene Mako	1916	2013	United States	1973	9	1938 United States finalist • ranking in 1938
Xavier Malisse	1980	–	Belgium		19	2002 Wimbledon semifinalist • ranking in 2002
Boris Maneff	1916	1960	Switzerland			1936 French Championships quarterfinalist
Amos Mansdorf	1965	–	Israel		18	1992 Australian Open quarterfinalist • ranking in 1987
Alberto Mancini	1969	–	Argentina		8	1989 French Open quarterfinalist • ranking in 1989
Gregory Mangin	1907	1978	United States			1928, 1930, 1933, 1935, 1926 U.S. Championships quarterfinalist • 1930 Wimbledon quarterfinalist • 1933 French Championships quarterfinalist
Adrian Mannarino	1988	–	France		17	Ranking in 2024
Bruce Manson	1956	–	United States			1981 U.S. Open quarterfinalist
Félix Mantilla	1974	–	Spain		10	1998 French Open semifinalist • ranking in 1998
John Marks	1952	–	Australia			1978 Australian Open finalist
William Marshall	1849	1921	(United Kingdom) Great Britain			1877 Wimbledon runner-up
Billy Martin	1956	–	United States			1977 Wimbledon quarterfinalist
Todd Martin	1970	–	United States		4	1994 Australian Open finalist • 1999 U.S. Open finalist • ranking in 1999
Tomás Martín Etcheverry	1999	–	Argentina		25	2023 French Open quarterfinalist • Ranking in 2026
Nicolás Massú	1979	–	Chile		9	Winner of 2 Olympic gold medals ◌ **2004 Olympic gold medalist** • ranking in 2004
Geoff Masters	1950	–	Australia			1974 Australian Open quarterfinalist
Wally Masur	1963	–	Australia		15	1987 Australian Open semifinalist • 1993 U.S. Open semifinalist • ranking in 1993
Paul-Henri Mathieu	1982	–	France		12	Ranking in 2008
Shuzo Matsuoka	1967	–	Japan			1995 Wimbledon quarterfinalist
Andreas Maurer	1958	–	West Germany		24	Ranking in 1986
Theodore Mavrogordato	1883	1941	(United Kingdom) Great Britain			1909/1914/1920 Wimbledon semifinalist
Florian Mayer	1983	–	Germany		18	2004/2012 Wimbledon quarterfinalist • ranking in 2011
Gene Mayer	1956	–	United States		4	1980 and 1982 Wimbledon quarterfinalist • 1982 and 1984 U.S. Open quarterfinalist • ranking in 1980
Leonardo Mayer	1987	–	Argentina		21	Ranking in 2015
Sandy Mayer	1952	–	United States		7	1973 Wimbledon semifinalist • ranking in 1982
Tim Mayotte	1960	–	United States		7	1983 Australian Open semifinalist • 1982 Wimbledon semifinalist • 1988 Olympic silver medalist • ranking in 1988
**John McEnroe**	1959	–	United States	1999	**1**	Winner of 7 Grand Slam titles → **1979, 1980, 1981 and 1984 U.S. Open champion** • **1981, 1983 and 1984 Wimbledon champion** • 1978, 1983 and 1984 Masters Grand Prix champion • **Year-End No. 1** from 1981 to 1984 • **ranking no. 1 for 170 weeks** → 4 weeks in 1980, 23 in 1981, 45 in 1982, 26 in 1983, 37 in 1984, 35 in 1985 • ranking no. 1 for 267 weeks → 37 weeks in 1979, 52 in 1980, 41 in 1981, 48 in 1982, 52 in 1983, 37 in 1984
Patrick McEnroe	1966	–	United States			1991 Australian Open semifinalist
Vivian McGrath	1916	1978	Australia			Winner of 1 Grand Slam title → **1927 Australian champion**
Ken McGregor	1929	2007	Australia	1999	3	Winner of 1 Grand Slam title → **1952 Australian champion** • ranking in 1952
Chuck McKinley	1941	1986	United States	1986	2	Winner of 1 Grand Slam title → **1963 Wimbledon champion** • ranking in 1963
**Maurice McLoughlin**	1890	1957	United States	1957	**1**	Winner of 2 Grand Slam titles → **1912 and 1913 United States champion**, 1911, 1914 and 1915 finalist • 1913 Wimbledon finalist (results likely incomplete as most drawsheets are unavailable) • **rated world no. 1 for 1 year**, 1914
Peter McNamara	1955	2019	Australia		7	1980 Australian Open semifinalist • ranking in 1983
Paul McNamee	1954	–	Australia		24	Ranking in 1986
Don McNeill	1918	1996	United States	1965		Winner of 2 Grand Slam titles → **1939 French champion, 1940 United States champion**
Frew McMillan	1942	–	South Africa	1992		Quarterfinalist 1972 US Open
Miloslav Mečíř	1964	–	Czechoslovakia		4	1988 **Olympic gold medalist** • 1986 US Open finalist • 1989 Australian Open finalist • ranking in 1988
Andrei Medvedev	1974	–	Soviet Union / Ukraine		4	1999 French Open finalist • ranking in 1994
**Daniil Medvedev**	1996	–	Russia		**1**	**2021 US Open Champion** • **2020 Tour finals champion** • 2021 French Open quarterfinalist • 2023/2024 Wimbledon semifinalist • 2021/2022/2024 Australian Open Finalist • 2020 US Open semifinalist • Ranking in 2022 • **World no. 1 for 16 weeks (2022)**
Ernest George Meers	1848	1928	(United Kingdom) Great Britain			1889 U.S. Championships semifinalist • 1895 Wimbledon semifinalist
Karl Meiler	1949	2014	West Germany		20	Ranking in 1973
Fernando Meligeni	1971	–	Brazil		25	1999 French Open semifinalist • ranking in 1999
Jürgen Melzer	1981	–	Austria		8	2010 French Open semifinalist • ranking in 2011
Jakub Menšík	2005		(Czech Republic) Czechia		12	2026 French Open semifinalist • Ranking in 2026
Roderich Menzel	1907	1987	Czechoslovakia			1938 French Championships finalist
Giuseppe Merlo	1927	2019	Italy			1955, 1956 French Championships semifinalist
Alex Metreveli	1944	–	Soviet Union			1972 French Open semifinalist • 1972 Australian Open semifinalist
Alex Michelsen	2004	–	United States			2026 U.S. Open quarterfinalist
Max Mirnyi	1977	–	Belarus		18	2002 US Open quarterfinalist • ranking in 2003
Dragutin Mitić	1917	1986	(Socialist Federal Republic of Yugoslavia) Yugoslavia			1938, 1946, 1949 French Championships quarterfinalist
Juan Mónaco	1984	–	Argentina		10	Ranking in 2012
Gaël Monfils	1986	–	France		6	2016/2022 Australian Open quarterfinalist • 2008 French Open semifinalist • 2016 US Open semifinalist • ranking in 2016
Albert Montañés	1980	–	Spain		22	Ranking in 2010
Edgar Moon	1904	1976	Australia			**1930 Australian champion**
Raymond Moore	1946	–	South Africa			1977 US Open quarterfinalist
Enrique Morea	1920	2006	Argentina			1953, 1954 French Championships semifinalist
Umberto De Morpurgo	1896	1961	Italy		8	1930 French Championships semifinalist • 1924 Olympic bronze medalist • rated world no. 8 in 1930
Buster Mottram	1955	–	(United Kingdom) Great Britain		15	Ranking in 1983
**Carlos Moyá**	1976	–	Spain		**1**	Winner of 1 Grand Slam title → 1998 **French Open champion** • 1998 Tour Finals finalist, 1997/2002 semifinalist • ranking **world no. 1** for 2 weeks in 1999
Marty Mulligan	1940	–	Australia			1962 Wimbledon finalist
Gardnar Mulloy	1913	2016	United States	1972	7	1952 U.S. finalist • ranking in 1952
Gilles Müller	1983	–	Luxembourg		21	2008 U.S. Open quarterfinalist • Ranking in 2017
**Andy Murray**	1987	–	(United Kingdom) Great Britain		**1**	Winner of 3 Grand Slam titles → **2012 US Open champion** •**2013 and 2016 Wimbledon Champion** • **2016 Tour Finals champion** • winner of 2 Olympic gold medals → 2012 and 2016 **Olympic gold medalist** • **Year-End no. 1** in 2016 • **ranking world no. 1 for 41 weeks (2016–17)**
Robert Murray	1892	1970	United States	1958		1917/1918 **U.S. champion**
Lorenzo Musetti	2002	–	Italy		5	2026 Australian Open quarterfinalist • 2025 French Open semifinalist • 2024 Wimbledon semifinalist • 2025 U.S. Open quarterfinalist • 2024 Olympic bronze medalist • Ranking in 2026
**Thomas Muster**	1967	–	Austria		**1**	Winner of 1 Grand Slam title → 1995 **French Open champion** • ranking **world no. 1** for 6 weeks
**Rafael Nadal**	1986	–	Spain		**1**	Winner of 22 Grand Slam titles including a **career Grand Slam** achieved in 2010 and 2 Olympic gold medals → 2005/2006/2007/2008/2010/2011/2012/2013/2014/2017/2018/2019/2020/2022 **French Open champion (14)** • 2008/2010 **Wimbledon champion (2)** • 2010/2013/2017/2019 **US Open champion (4)** • 2009/2022 **Australian Open champion (2)** • 2010/2013 Tour Finals finalist, 2006/2007/2015/2020 semifinalist • 2008 **Olympic single gold medalist** • **Year-End No. 1** in 2008, 2010, 2013, 2017 and 2019 • **world no. 1 for 209 weeks (2008–2020)**
Brandon Nakashima	2001	–	United States		16	Ranking in 2026
David Nalbandian	1982	–	Argentina		3	2002 Wimbledon finalist • 2005 **Tour Finals champion**, 2006 semifinalist • ranking in 2006
**Ilie Năstase**	1946	–	Romania	1991	**1**	Winner of 2 Grand Slam titles → 1972 **US Open champion** • 1973 **French Open champion** • 1971/1972/1973/1975 **Masters champion**, 1974 finalist • **Year-End No. 1** in 1973 • ranking **world no. 1** for 40 weeks and for 1973
Carr Neel	1873	1949	United States			1895, 1896 U.S. Championships semifinalist
**John Newcombe**	1944	–	Australia	1986	**1**	Winner of 7 Grand Slam titles → 1967/1970/1971 **Wimbledon champion** • 1967/1973 **US Open champion** • 1973/1975 **Australian Open champion** • ranking **world no. 1**
Kurt Nielsen	1930	2011	Denmark			1953/1955 Wimbledon finalist
Jarkko Nieminen	1981	–	Finland		13	2005 U.S. Open quarterfinalist • 2006 Wimbledon quarterfinalist • 2008 Australian Open quarterfinalist • ranking in 2006
Nathaniel Niles	1886	1932	United States			1917 U.S. Championships finalist
Harold Nisbet	1873	1937	(United Kingdom) Great Britain			1897 U.S. Championships finalist
Kei Nishikori	1989	–	Japan		4	2014 US Open finalist • 2012/2015/2016/2019 Australian Open quarterfinalist • 2015/2017/2019 French Open quarterfinalist • 2018/2019 Wimbledon quarterfinalist • 2014,2016 Tour finals semifinalist • 2016 Olympic bronze medalist • ranking in 2015
Yoshihito Nishioka	1995	–	Japan		24	Ranking in 2023
**Yannick Noah**	1960	–	France	2005	3	Winner of 1 Grand Slam title → 1983 **French Open champion** • ranking in 1986
Magnus Norman	1976	–	Sweden		2	2000 French Open finalist • Ranking in 2000
Cameron Norrie	1995	–	(United Kingdom) Great Britain		8	Ranking in 2022 • 2022 Wimbledon semifinalist
Arthur Norris			(United Kingdom) Great Britain			1900 Olympic bronze medalist
Brian Norton	1899	1956	South Africa			1921 Wimbledon finalist
Karel Nováček	1965	–	Czechoslovakia / Czech Republic			1994 US Open semifinalist • 1987/1993 French Open quarterfinalist
Jiří Novák	1975	–	Czech Republic		5	2002 Australian Open semifinalist • ranking in 2002
**Hans Nüsslein**	1910	1991	/ Germany	2006	**1**	Ranking in 1933 and 1934
Joakim Nyström	1963	–	Sweden		7	Ranking in 1986
**Pat O'Hara Wood**	1891	1961	Australia	1986	7	Winner of 2 Grand Slam titles → 1920/1923 Australian champion • rated world no. 7 in 1922
Tom Okker	1944	–	Netherlands			1968 US Open finalist, 1971 semifinalist • 1969 French Open semifinalist, 1973 quarterfinalist • 1971 Australian Open semifinalist, 1970 quarterfinalist • 1978 Wimbledon semifinalist, 1968/1969/1975/1979 quarterfinalist
**Alex Olmedo**	1936	2020	Peru / United States	1987		Winner of 2 Grand Slam titles → 1959 **Australian champion** • 1959 **Wimbledon champion** • 1959 U.S. finalist
Reilly Opelka	1997	–	United States		17	Ranking in 2022
**Manuel Orantes**	1949	–	/Spain	2012		Winner of 1 Grand Slam title → 1975 **US Open champion**, 1976/1977 quarterfinalist • 1974 French Open finalist, 1972 semifinalist, 1976/1978 quarterfinalist • 1972 Wimbledon semifinalist • 1968 Australian Open quarterfinalist • 1976 **Masters champion**
Jim Osborne	1945	–	United States			1971 U.S. Open quarterfinalist
**Rafael Osuna**	1938	1969	Mexico	1979	**1**	Winner of 1 Grand Slam title → 1963 **U.S. Open champion** • ranking no. 1 in 1963
Leander Paes	1973	–	India	2024		1996 Olympic bronze medalist
Dinny Pails	1921	1986	Australia			Winner of 1 Grand Slam title → 1946 **Australian champion**, 1947 finalist • 1947 Wimbledon semifinalist, 1946 quarterfinalist
Benoît Paire	1989	–	France		18	Ranking in 2016
Josip Palada	1912	1994	(Socialist Federal Republic of Yugoslavia) Yugoslavia			1938 French Championships semifinalist
Antonio Palafox	1936	–	Mexico			1965 U.S. Championships quarterfinalist
**Adriano Panatta**	1950	–	Italy		4	Winner of 1 Grand Slam title → 1976 **French Open champion** • 1976 **Davis Cup champion** • ranking in 1976
Jahial Parmly Paret	1870	1952	United States			1899 U.S. Championships finalist
James Cecil Parke	1881	1946	(United Kingdom) Great Britain			Winner of 1 Grand Slam title → 1912 **Australian champion**
**Frank Parker**	1916	1997	United States	1966		Winner of 4 Grand Slam titles → 1944, 1945 **U.S. champion**, 1948, 1949 **French champion** • 1937 Wimbledon semifinalist
Cecil Parr	1847	1928	(United Kingdom) Great Britain			1879 Wimbledon All-Comers semifinalist
Onny Parun	1947	–	New Zealand			1973 Australian Open finalist
Charlie Pasarell	1944	–	United States	2013		1965 U.S. quarterfinalist • 1976 Wimbledon quarterfinalist
Konstantinos Paspatis	1878	1903	Greece			1896 Olympic bronze medalist
David Pate	1962	–	United States		18	Ranking in 1987
**Gerald Patterson**	1895	1967	Australia	1989	**1**	Winner of 3 Grand Slam titles → 1919/1922 Wimbledon champion • 1927 Australian champion • Rated co-**world no. 1** in 1919 with "Little Bill" Johnston
Andrew Pattison	1949	–	Rhodesia		24	Ranking in 1974
**Budge Patty**	1924	2021	United States	1977	**1**	Winner of 2 Grand Slam titles → 1950 **French champion** • 1950 **Wimbledon champion** • ranking in 1950
Tommy Paul	1997	–	United States		8	2023 Australian Open semifinalist • 2025 French Open quarterfinalist • 2024 Wimbledon quarterfinalist • Ranking in 2025
Andrei Pavel	1974	–	Romania		13	2002 French Open quarterfinalist • ranking in 2004
Víctor Pecci	1955	–	Paraguay		9	Ranking in 1980
Theodore Pell	1879	1967	United States	1966		1915 United States semifinalist
Guido Pella	1990	–	Argentina		20	Ranking in 2019 • 2019 Wimbledon quarterfinalist
Pierre Pellizza	1917	1974	France			1946 Wimbledon quarterfinalist
Guillermo Pérez Roldán	1969	–	Argentina		13	Ranking in 1988
Mikael Pernfors	1963	–	Sweden		10	1986 French Open finalist • 1990 Australian Open quarterfinalist • ranking in 1986
**Fred Perry**	1909	1995	(United Kingdom) Great Britain	1975	**1**	Winner of 8 Grand Slam titles, including a Career Slam → 1933/1934/1936 **U.S. champion** • 1934/1935/1936 **Wimbledon champion** • 1934 **Australian champion** • 1935 **French champion** • rated **world no. 1** for 5 years
Yvon Petra	1916	1984	France	2016		Winner of 1 Grand Slam title → 1946 **Wimbledon champion**
Hank Pfister	1953	–	United States		19	1978/1981/1982 Australian Open semifinalist • ranking in 1983
Mark Philippoussis	1976	–	Australia		8	1998 US Open finalist • 2003 Wimbledon finalist • ranking in 1999
Barry Phillips-Moore	1937	2023	Australia			1968 Australian Championships semifinalist
**Nicola Pietrangeli**	1933	2025	Italy	1986	3	Winner of 2 Grand Slam titles → 1959 and 1960 French Open champion • ranking in 1959
Nikola Pilić	1939	2025	(Socialist Federal Republic of Yugoslavia) Yugoslavia			1973 French Open finalist
**Joshua Pim**	1869	1942	(Republic of Ireland) Ireland			Winner of 2 Grand Slam titles → 1893, 1894 **Wimbledon champion**
Libor Pimek	1963	–	Czechoslovakia		21	Ranking in 1985
Ulrich Pinner	1954	–	West Germany		19	Ranking in 1979
Cédric Pioline	1969	–	France			1993 US Open finalist • 1997 Wimbledon finalist • 1998 French Open semifinalist
Hans-Jürgen Pohmann	1947	–	West Germany			1974 French Open quarterfinalist
Alexander Popp	1976	–	Germany			2000/2003 Wimbledon quarterfinalist
Alexei Popyrin	1999	–	Australia		19	Ranking in 2025
Vasek Pospisil	1990	–	Canada		25	2015 Wimbledon quarterfinalist • ranking in 2014
Lucas Pouille	1994	–	France		10	2019 Australian Open semifinalist • 2016 Wimbledon quarterfinalist • 2016 U.S. Open quarterfinalist • Ranking in 2018
Goran Prpić	1964	–	Croatia		16	1991 Australian Open quarterfinalist • 1993 French Open quarterfinalist • Ranking in 1991
Patrick Proisy	1949	–	France		23	1973 French Open finalist • Ranking in 1973
Mariano Puerta	1978	–	Argentina		9	2005 French Open finalist • Ranking in 2005
Franjo Punčec	1913	1985	(Socialist Federal Republic of Yugoslavia) Yugoslavia			1938 French Championships semifinalist • 1938/1939 Wimbledon semifinalist
Mel Purcell	1959	–	United States		21	Ranking in 1980
Sam Querrey	1987	–	United States		11	2017 Wimbledon semifinalist • 2017 U.S. Open quarterfinalist • Ranking in 2018
**Adrian Quist**	1913	1991	Australia	1984		Winner of 3 Grand Slam titles → 1936/1940/1948 **Australian champion**
**Patrick Rafter**	1972	–	Australia	2006	**1**	Winner of 2 Grand Slam titles → 1997/1998 **U.S. Open champion** • 2000/2001 Wimbledon finalist • 1997 French Open semifinalist • 2001 Australian Open semifinalist • Ranking **world no. 1** for 1 week
Dennis Ralston	1942	2020	United States	1987	5	1966 Wimbledon finalist • Ranking in 1966
Raúl Ramírez	1953	–	Mexico		4	Ranking in 1976
Albert Ramos Viñolas	1988	–	Spain		17	French Open quarterfinalist • Ranking in 2016
Milos Raonic	1990	–	Canada		3	2016 Australian Open finalist • 2014 French Open semifinalist • 2016 Wimbledon finalist • 2016 Tour Finals semifinalist • Ranking in 2016
Louis Raymond	1895	1962	South Africa			1924 Wimbledon semifinalist • **1920 Olympic gold medalist**
Richey Reneberg	1965	–	United States		20	Ranking in 1991
Peter Rennert	1958	–	United States			1980 Australian Open quarterfinalist
**Ernest Renshaw**	1861	1899	(United Kingdom) Great Britain	1983		Winner of 1 Grand Slam title → 1888 **Wimbledon champion**
**William Renshaw**	1861	1904	(United Kingdom) Great Britain	1983		Winner of 7 Grand Slam titles → 1881/1882/1883/1884/1885/1886/1889 **Wimbledon champion**
George E. Richards	1921	1992	United States			1942 U.S. National Championships quarterfinalist
Vinnie Richards	1903	1959	United States	1961	2	1922/1924/1925/1926 U.S. Championship semifinalist • 1926 French Championships semifinalist • **1924 Olympic gold medalist** • rated world no. 2 in 1924
Cliff Richey	1946	–	United States		16	1970/1972 U.S. Open semifinalist • Ranking in 1973
**Bobby Riggs**	1918	1995	United States	1967		Winner of 3 Grand Slam titles → 1939 **Wimbledon champion** • 1939/1941 **U.S. champion** • Ranked **world no. 1** for 3 years
Marty Riessen	1941	–	United States		11	1971 Australian Open quarterfinalist • 1971 U.S. Open quarterfinalist • Ranking in 1974
Arthur Rinderknech	1995	–	France		24	Ranking in 2026
**Marcelo Ríos**	1975	–	Chile		**1**	1998 Australian Open finalist • Ranking **world no. 1** for 6 weeks in 1998
Frank Riseley	1877	1959	(United Kingdom) Great Britain			1903(Ch)/1904(Ch)/1906(Ch) Wimbledon finalist
Major Ritchie	1870	1955	(United Kingdom) Great Britain			1902/1903/1904/1909(Ch) Wimbledon finalist • 1908 Olympic outdoor gold medalist • 1908 Olympic indoor bronze medalist
Tommy Robredo	1982	–	Spain		5	2007 Australian Open quarterfinalist • 2003/2005/2007/2009/2013 French Open quarterfinalist • 2013 U.S. Open quarterfinalist • Ranking in 2006
**Tony Roche**	1945	–	Australia	1986	2	1966 **French champion** • Ranking in 1969
Olivier Rochus	1981	–	Belgium		24	Ranking in 2005
**Andy Roddick**	1982	–	United States	2017	**1**	Winner of 1 Grand Slam title • 2003 **U.S. Open champion** • 2003/2004/2007 Masters semifinalist • **Year-End No. 1** in 2003 • Ranking **world no. 1** for 13 weeks in 2003–2004
Christophe Roger-Vasselin	1957	–	France			1983 French Open semifinalist
**Mervyn Rose**	1930	2017	Australia	2001	3	Winner of 2 Grand Slam titles • 1954 **Australian champion** • 1958 **French champion** • Ranking in 1958
**Ken Rosewall**	1934	–	Australia	1980	**1**	Winner of 8 Grand Slam titles • 1953/1955/1971(O)/1972(O) **Australian (Open) champion** • 1953/1968(O) **French (Open) champion** • 1956/1970(O) **US (Open) champion** • Ranking in 1961
Marc Rosset	1970	–	Switzerland		9	1992 **Olympic gold medalist** • 1996 French Open semifinalist • Ranking in 1995
Derrick Rostagno	1965	–	United States		13	1988 U.S. Open quarterfinalist • Ranking in 1991
Andrey Rublev	1997	–	Russia		5	2017/2020/2022/2023 U.S. Open quarterfinalist • 2020/2022 French Open quarterfinalist • 2021/2023/2024 Australian Open quarterfinalist • 2023 Wimbledon quarterfinalist • 2022 Tour Finals semifinalist • Ranking in 2021
Ray Ruffels	1946	–	Australia			1969/1975 Australian Open semifinalist
Holger Rune	2003	–	Denmark		4	2022/2023 French Open quarterfinalist • 2023 Wimbledon quarterfinalist • Ranking in 2023
Greg Rusedski	1973	–	(United Kingdom) Great Britain		4	1997 U.S. Open finalist • Ranking in 1997
Alejo Russell	1916	1977	Argentina			1942/1945 U.S. National Championships quarterfinalist
Casper Ruud	1998	–	Norway		2	2022 U.S. Open finalist • 2022/2023 French Open finalist • 2022 Tour Finals finalist • Ranking in 2022
André Sá	1978	–	Brazil			2002 Wimbledon quarterfinalist
John Sadri	1956	–	United States		14	Ranking in 1980
**Marat Safin**	1980	–	Russia	2016	**1**	Winner of 2 Grand Slam titles → 2000 **US Open champion** • 2005 **Australian Open champion** • 2000/2004 Masters semifinalist • Ranking **world no. 1** for 9 weeks
Roman Safiullin	1997	–	Russia			2023 Wimbledon quarterfinalist
**Pete Sampras**	1971	–	United States	2007	**1**	Winner of 14 Grand Slam titles → 1990/1993/1995/1996/2002 **US Open champion** • 1993/1994/1995/1997/1998/1999/2000 **Wimbledon champion** • 1994/1997 **Australian Open champion** • 1991/1994/1996/1997/1999 **Masters champion** • **Year-End No. 1** from 1993 to 1998 • Ranking **world no. 1** for 286 weeks
Emilio Sánchez	1965	–	Spain		7	1988 French Open quarterfinalist • 1988 U.S. Open quarterfinalist • Ranking in 1990
Javier Sánchez	1968	–	Spain		23	1991/1996 U.S. Open quarterfinalist • Ranking in 1994
Tennys Sandgren	1991	–	United States			2018/2020 Australian Open quarterfinalist
**Manuel Santana**	1938	2021	Spain	1984	**1**	Winner of 4 Grand Slam titles → 1961/1964 **French champion** • 1965 **U.S. champion** • 1966 **Wimbledon champion** • Ranking **world no. 1** amateur in 1966
Fabrice Santoro	1972	–	France		17	2006 Australian Open quarterfinalist • Ranking in 2001
Jiro Sato	1908	1934	Japan		3	1931/1933 French championship semifinalist • 1932 Australian championship semifinalist • 1932/1933 Wimbledon semifinalist • Ranking in 1933
**Dick Savitt**	1927	2023	United States	1976	2	Winner of 2 Grand Slam titles → 1951 **Wimbledon champion** • 1951 **Australian champion** • Ranking in 1951
Bill Scanlon	1956	2021	United States		9	Ranking in 1984
Sjeng Schalken	1976	–	Netherlands		11	2002 U.S. Open semifinalist • Ranking in 2003
Michiel Schapers	1959	–	Netherlands		25	1985/1988 Australian Open quarterfinalist • Ranking in 1988
Richard Schlesinger	1900	1968	Australia			1924/1929 Australian Championships finalist
**Ted Schroeder**	1921	2006	United States	1966		Winner of 2 Grand Slam titles → 1942 **U.S. champion** • 1949 **Wimbledon champion**
Rainer Schüttler	1976	–	Germany		5	2003 Australian Open finalist • 2003 Masters semifinalist • Ranking in 2003
Diego Schwartzman	1992	–	Argentina		8	2020 French Open semifinalist • 2017/2019 U.S. Open quarterfinalist • Ranking in 2020
Gene Scott	1937	2006	United States	2008		1967 U.S. Championship semifinalist
**Richard Sears**	1861	1943	United States	1955		Winner of 7 Grand Slam titles • 1881–1887 **U.S. champion**
**Frank Sedgman**	1927	–	Australia	1979	**1**	Winner of 5 Grand Slam titles • 1949/1950 **Australian champion** • 1951/1952 **U.S. champion** • 1952 **Wimbledon champion** • Considered **world no. 1** amateur for 1952
Abe Segal	1930	2016	South Africa			1964 Wimbledon quarterfinalist
**Pancho Segura**	1921	2017	United States	1984		1942/1943/1944/1945/1946/1947 U.S. semifinalist • Considered **world no. 1** professional for 1950/1952
**Vic Seixas**	1923	2024	United States	1971		Winner of 2 Grand Slam titles • 1953 **Wimbledon champion** • 1954 **U.S. champion**
Andreas Seppi	1984	–	Italy		18	Ranking in 2013
Denis Shapovalov	1999	–	Canada		10	2022 Australian Open quarterfinalist • 2020 U.S. Open quarterfinalist • Ranking in 2020
Quincy Shaw	1869	1960	United States			1889 U.S Championships finalist
Ben Shelton	2002	–	United States		4	2025 Australian Open semifinalist • 2025 Wimbledon quarterfinalist • 2026 U.S. Open finalist • Ranking in 2026
Frank Shields	1909	1975	United States	1964		1930 U.S. Championships finalist • 1931 Wimbledon finalist
Zenzo Shimizu	1891	1977	Japan			1920 Wimbledon (challenge round) finalist
Bill Sidwell	1920	2021	Australia		10	1948–1950 Australian Championships semifinalist – Ranking in 1949
Jan Siemerink	1970	–	Netherlands		14	1998 Wimbledon quarterfinalist • Ranking in 1998
Gilles Simon	1984	–	France		6	2009 Australian Open quarterfinalist • 2015 Wimbledon quarterfinalist • 2008 Masters semifinalist • Ranking in 2009
**Jannik Sinner**	2001	–	Italy		**1**	**2024/2025 Australian Open champion** • 2025 French Open finalist • **2025/2026 Wimbledon champion** • **2024 US Open champion** • **2024/2025 Tour Finals champion** • Ranking in 2024 • **Year-End No. 1** in 2024 **• ranking world no. 1** **for 87 weeks** in 2024, 2025 and 2026.
Orlando Sirola	1928	1995	Italy			1960 French Championships semifinalist
Dick Skeen	1906	1994	United States			Ranked no. 2 in professional tennis in 1941
Horst Skoff	1968	2008	Austria		18	Ranking in 1990
**Henry Slocum**	1862	1949	United States	1955		Winner of 2 Grand Slam titles • 1888/1889 **U.S. champion**
Pavel Složil	1955	–	Czechoslovakia		12	Ranking in 1984
Tomáš Šmíd	1956	–	Czechoslovakia		11	Ranking in 1984
**Stan Smith**	1946	–	United States	1987	**1**	Winner of 2 Grand Slam titles • 1971 **U.S. Open champion** • 1972 **Wimbledon champion** • 1970 **Masters champion** • Ranking **world no. 1** for 1972 (year-end)
Sydney Howard Smith	1872	1947	(United Kingdom) Great Britain			1899/1900(Ch)/1905 Wimbledon finalist
Jack Sock	1992	–	United States		8	Ranking in 2017
Robin Söderling	1984	–	Sweden		4	2009/2010 French Open finalist • 2009 Masters semifinalist • Ranking in 2010
Harold Solomon	1952	–	United States		5	Ranking in 1980
Lorenzo Sonego	1995	–	Italy		21	2025 Australian Open quarterfinalist • Ranking in 2021
Vince Spadea	1974	–	United States		18	1999 Australian Open quarterfinalist • Ranking in 2005
Pat Spence	1872	1947	South Africa			1927 French Championships semifinalist
Franco Squillari	1975	–	Argentina		11	2000 French Open semifinalist • Ranking in 2000
Milan Šrejber	1963	–	Czechoslovakia		23	1986 U.S. Open quarterfinalist • Ranking in 1986
Paradorn Srichaphan	1979	–	Thailand		9	Ranking in 2003
Carl-Uwe Steeb	1967	–	West Germany/		14	Ranking in 1990
Giorgio de Stefani	1904	1992	Italy			1932 French Championships singles finalist, 1935 Australian Championships singles quarterfinalist
Ulf Stenlund	1967	–	Sweden		23	Ranking in 1987
Radek Štěpánek	1978	–	Czech Republic		8	2006 Wimbledon quarterfinalist • Ranking in 2006
Brett Steven	1969	–	New Zealand			1993 Australian Open quarterfinalist
**Michael Stich**	1968	–	Germany	2018	2	Winner of 1 Grand Slam title • 1991 **Wimbledon champion** • 1993 **Masters champion**
Dick Stockton	1951	–	United States			1974 Wimbledon semifinalist
Les Stoefen	1911	1970	United States			1934 U.S. Championships semifinalist
**Fred Stolle**	1938	2025	Australia	1985	2	Winner of 2 Grand Slam titles • 1965 **French champion**• 1966 **U.S. champion**
Jason Stoltenberg	1970	–	Australia		19	1996 Wimbledon semifinalist • Ranking in 1994
Allan Stone	1945	–	Australia			1972 Australian Open semifinalist
Jan-Lennard Struff	1990	–	Germany		21	2026 Wimbledon quarterfinalist • Ranking in 2023
Eric Sturgess	1920	2004	South Africa		6	1947/1951 French Championships finalist, 1948 U.S. Championships finalist • Ranking in 1948
Henrik Sundström	1964	–	Sweden		6	1984 French Open quarterfinalist • Ranking in 1984
Jonas Svensson	1966	–	Sweden		10	1988 French Open semifinalist • Ranking in 1991
Ottó Szigeti	1911	1976	Hungary			1939 French Championships semifinalist
Bill Talbert	1918	1999	United States	1967		1944/1945 U.S. Championships finalist
**Roscoe Tanner**	1951	–	United States		4	Winner of 1 Grand Slam title • 1977 **Australian Open champion** • Ranking in 1979
Momčilo Tapavica	1872	1949	Hungary			1896 Olympic bronze medalist
Balázs Taróczy	1954	–	Hungary		13	1976/1981 French Open quarterfinalist • Ranking in 1982
Alejandro Tabilo	1997	–	Chile		19	Ranking in 2024
Howard Taylor	1865	1920	United States			1884(Ch)/1886/1887/1888 U.S. Championships finalist
Roger Taylor	1941	–	(United Kingdom) Great Britain		11	Ranking in 1973
**Brian Teacher**	1954	–	United States		7	Winner of 1 Grand Slam title • 1980 **Australian Open champion** • Ranking in 1981
Eliot Teltscher	1959	–	United States		6	Ranking in 1982
Ben Testerman	1962	–	United States		22	Ranking in 1984
**Dominic Thiem**	1993	–	Austria		3	**2020 U.S. Open Champion** • 2020 Australian Open finalist • 2018/2019 French Open finalist • 2019/2020 Tour Finals finalist • Ranking in 2020
Frances Tiafoe	1998	–	United States		8	2019 Australian Open quarterfinalist • 2025 French Open quarterfinalist • 2022/2024/2026 U.S. Open semifinalist • Ranking in 2026
Learner Tien	2005	–	United States		12	2026 Australian Open quarterfinalist • Ranking in 2026
**Bill Tilden**	1893	1953	United States	1959	**1**	Winner of 10 Grand Slam titles • 1920/1921/1922/1923/1924/1925/1929 **U.S. champion** • 1920/1921/1930 **Wimbledon champion** • 7 times **world no. 1**
Mikael Tillström	1972	–	Sweden			1996 Australian Open quarterfinalist
Henk Timmer	1904	1998	Netherlands			1927/1929 Wimbledon quarterfinalist
Janko Tipsarević	1984	–	Serbia		8	2011/2012 US Open quarterfinalist • Ranking in 2012
Ion Țiriac	1939	–	Romania	2013		1968 French Open quarterfinalist
Ignacy Tłoczyński	1911	2000	Poland			1939 French Championships quarterfinalist
Bernard Tomic	1992	–	Australia		17	2011 Wimbledon quarterfinalist • Ranking in 2016
**Tony Trabert**	1930	2021	United States	1970	1	Winner of 5 Grand Slam titles • 1953/1955 **U.S. champion** • 1954/1955 **French champion** • 1955 **Wimbledon champion** • Ranking world number 1 amateur in 1953
Viktor Troicki	1986	–	Serbia		12	Ranking in 2011
Stefanos Tsitsipas	1998	–	Greece		3	2021 French Open finalist • 2023 Australian Open finalist • **2019 Tour Finals champion** • Ranking in 2021
Jo-Wilfried Tsonga	1985	–	France		5	2008 Australian Open finalist • 2011 Tour Finals finalist • ranking in 2012
Thierry Tulasne	1963	–	France		10	Ranking in 1986
Dmitry Tursunov	1982	–	Russia		20	Ranking in 2006
Valentin Vacherot	1998	–	Monaco		16	Ranking in 2026
Botic van de Zandschulp	1995	–	Netherlands		22	2021/2026 U.S. Open quarterfinalist • Ranking in 2022
John Van Ryn	1905	1999	United States	1963	8	1929/1930/1931/1936/1937 U.S. Championship quarterfinalist • rated world no. 8 in 1929
Robert Van't Hof	1959	–	United States		25	Ranking in 1983
Fernando Verdasco	1983	–	Spain		7	2009 Australian Open semifinalist • Ranking in 2009
Martin Verkerk	1978	–	Netherlands		14	2003 French Open finalist • Ranking in 2003
Ian Vermaak	1933	2025	South Africa		10	1959 French Championships finalist • Ranking in 1959
Armando Vieira	1925	2010	Brazil			1951 Wimbledon quarterfinalist
**Guillermo Vilas**	1952	–	Argentina	1991	2	Winner of 4 Grand Slam titles • 1977 **French Open champion** • 1977 **U.S. Open champion** • 1978/1979 **Australian Open champion** • 1974 **Masters champion**
**Ellsworth Vines**	1911	1994	United States	1962	**1**	Winner of 3 Grand Slam titles • 1931/1932 **U.S. Champion** • 1932 **Wimbledon Champion** • Rated **world no 1** for 4 years (1932/1935/1936/1937)
Adrian Voinea	1974	–	Romania			1995 French Open quarterfinalist
Filippo Volandri	1981	–	Italy		25	Ranking in 2007
Alexander Volkov	1967	2019	Russia		14	1993 US Open semifinalist • Ranking in 1994
Butch Walts	1955	–	United States			1978 U.S. Open quarterfinalist
Holcombe Ward	1878	1961	United States	1956		Winner of 1 Grand Slam title • 1904 **U.S. champion**
Leo Ware	1876	1914	United States			1897/1898/1899/1901 U.S. semifinalist
Kim Warwick	1952	–	Australia		15	1980 Australian Open finalist • Ranking in 1981
Watson Washburn	1894	1973	United States	1965		1911/1912/1913/1916/1920 U.S. Championship quarterfinalist
Philippe Washer	1924	2015	Belgium			1957 French Championships quarterfinalist
MaliVai Washington	1969	–	United States		11	1996 Wimbledon finalist • 1994 Australian Open quarterfinalist • Ranking in 1992
**Stan Wawrinka**	1985	–	Switzerland		3	Winner of 3 Grand Slam singles titles • **2014 Australian Open champion** • **2015 French Open champion** • **2016 US Open champion** • 2013/2014/2015 Tour Finals semifinalist • Ranking in 2014
David Wheaton	1969	–	United States		12	1991 Wimbledon semifinalist • Ranking in 1992
**Malcolm Whitman**	1877	1932	United States	1955		Winner of 3 Grand Slam titles • 1898/1899/1900 **US champion**
**Mats Wilander**	1964	–	Sweden	2002	**1**	Winner of 7 Grand Slam titles • 1982/1985/1988 **French Open champion** • 1983/1984/1988 **Australian Open champion** • 1988 **U.S. Open champion** • 1987 Masters finalist • **Year-End No. 1** in 1988 • Ranking **world no. 1** for 20 weeks
**Tony Wilding**	1883	1915	New Zealand	1978	**1**	Winner of 6 Grand Slam titles → 1906/1909 **Australian champion** • 1910/1911/1912/1913 **Wimbledon champion** • Ranking in 1913 1912 • Olympic indoor bronze medalist
**R. Norris Williams**	1891	1968	United States	1957	5	1914, 1916 **US champion** • Ranking in 1913
Tim Wilkison	1959	–	United States		23	1986 US Open quarterfinalist • Ranking in 1986
Bobby Wilson	1935	2020	(United Kingdom) Great Britain			1958/1959/1961/1963 Wimbledon quarterfinalist • 1960/1963 U.S. National quarterfinalist • 1963 French Championships quarterfinalist
Charles Winslow	1888	1963	South Africa			1912 Olympic gold medalist • 1920 Olympic bronze medalist
Todd Witsken	1963	1998	United States			1988 Australian Open quarterfinalist
Sidney Wood	1911	2009	United States	1964		Winner of 1 Grand Slam title → 1931 **Wimbledon champion** • 1935 U.S. Championships finalist
Todd Woodbridge	1971	–	Australia	2010	19	Ranking in 1997
Mark Woodforde	1965	–	Australia	2010	19	Ranking in 1996
Chris Woodruff	1973	–	United States			2000 Australian Open quarterfinalist
**Robert Wrenn**	1873	1925	United States	1955		Winner of 4 Grand Slam titles → 1893, 1894, 1896 and 1897 **US champion**
George Wrenn	1865	1948	United States			1900 U.S. Championships finalist
**Beals Wright**	1879	1925	United States	1956		Winner of 1 Grand Slam title → 1905 **US champion** • Winner of 1 Olympic gold medal → 1904
Mikhail Youzhny	1982	–	Russia		8	2006/2010 US Open semifinalist • Ranking in 2008
Jaime Yzaga	1967	–	Peru		18	1991 Australian Open quarterfinalist • 1994 U.S. Open quarterfinalist • Ranking in 1989
Mariano Zabaleta	1978	–	Argentina		20	2001 U.S. Open quarterfinalist • Ranking in 2000
Vladimír Zedník	1947	–	Czechoslovakia			1973 Australian Open quarterfinalist
Slobodan Živojinović	1963	–	(Socialist Federal Republic of Yugoslavia) Yugoslavia		19	1985 Australian Open semifinalist • 1986 Wimbledon semifinalist • Ranking in 1987
**Alexander Zverev**	1997	–	Germany		**1**	2025 Australian Open finalist • **2026 French Open champion** • 2026 Wimbledon finalist • **2026 U.S. Open champion** • **2018/2021 Tour Finals champion** • 2020 Olympic gold medalist • **Year-End No. 1** in 2026
Mischa Zverev	1987	–	Germany		25	2017 Australian Open quarterfinalist • Ranking in 2017

== See also ==
- List of male doubles tennis players
- List of female tennis players
- Lists of tennis players
- Lists of sportspeople
- List of ATP number 1 ranked singles tennis players
- World number 1 ranked male tennis players
- Top ten ranked male tennis players
- Top ten ranked male tennis players (1912–1972)
- List of Grand Slam men's singles champions
