= 1899 U.S. National Championships – Men's singles =

Men's singles
- 1899 U.S. National Championships

Final
- Champion: (United States) Malcolm D. Whitman
- Runner-up: (United States) Jahial Parmly Paret
- Score: 6–1, 6–2, 3–6, 7–5

Events
Singles	men	women
Doubles	men	women
← 1898 ·	U.S. National Championships	· 1900 →

Defending champion Malcolm Whitman defeated Jahial Parmly Paret in the challenge round, 6–1, 6–2, 3–6, 7–5 to win the men's singles tennis title at the 1899 U.S. National Championships.

== Draw ==
=== Challenge round ===
Challenge round
(United States) MD Whitman	6	6	3	7
(United States) J Parmly Paret	1	2	6	5

=== Finals ===
Semifinals
(United States) LE Ware	5	2	4
(United States) J Parmly Paret	7	6	6
(United States) D Davis	6	6	8
(United States) K Collins	4	1	6

Final
(United States) J Parmly Paret	7	8	6	2	6
(United States) D Davis	5	10	3	6	4

=== Earlier rounds ===
==== Section 1 ====
First round

Second round
(United States) J Appleton Allen
(United States) NH Mundy	w/	o
(United States) H Ward	6	6	4	6
(United States) CR Budlong	4	4	6	2
EA Freshman	2	4	3
(United States) A Codman	6	6	6
(United States) N McLeod
(United States) LE Ware	w/	o

Third round
(United States) NH Mundy	6	8	2	0
(United States) H Ward	4	10	6	6
(United States) A Codman	7	3	3
(United States) LE Ware	9	6	6

Quarterfinals
(United States) H Ward	6	4	11	2	4
(United States) LE Ware	3	6	9	6	6

==== Section 2 ====
First round
(United States) R Stevens	w/	o
(United States) D Miller
(United States) RD Little	w/	o
(United States) F Huntington
(United States) B Huntington	6	8	6
(United States) R McKittrick	2	6	4

Second round
(United States) M Chace	6	8	0	3
(United States) J Parmly Paret	3	10	6	6
(United States) W Larned
(United States) H Avery	w/	o
(United States) HW Stiness
(United States) R Stevens	w/	o
(United States) RD Little	4	6	4
(United States) B Huntington	6	8	6

Third round
(United States) J Parmly Paret	6	6	6
(United States) H Avery	2	3	3
(United States) R Stevens	6	6	3	3	1
(United States) B Huntington	2	3	6	6	6

Quarterfinals
(United States) J Parmly Paret	3	6	4	6	6
(United States) B Huntington	6	3	6	4	0

==== Section 3 ====
First round
(United States) WS Bond	6	4	6	6
(United States) W Clothier	3	6	4	4
(United States) JS Bridges	w/	o
(United States) P Whitney
(United States) BC Wright	w/	o
(United States) G Sheldon

Second round
(United States) WS Bond	6	6	6
(United States) JS Bridges	1	2	0
(United States) BC Wright	6	6	6
(United States) LJ Grant	2	2	1
(United States) CN Beard	6	6	8
(United States) DS Ricker	2	2	6
(United States) D Davis	6	6	6
(United States) HG Whitehead	2	4	0

Third round
(United States) WS Bond	4	6	7	4	6
(United States) BC Wright	6	4	5	6	3
(United States) CN Beard	0	1
(United States) D Davis	6	6

Quarterfinals
(United States) WS Bond	4	4	6	4
(United States) D Davis	6	6	1	6

==== Section 4 ====
First round

Second round
(United States) GL Wrenn	5	8	7	6
(United States) EP Fischer	7	6	5	2
(United States) JS Taylor	5	3	6	3	6
JK Willing	7	6	3	6	2
(United States) T Sturgis	3	1	1
(United States) K Collins	6	6	6
(United States) WC Grant	w/	o
(United States) E Stille

Third round
(United States) GL Wrenn	6	6	6
(United States) JS Taylor	2	3	3
(United States) K Collins	6	6	6
(United States) WC Grant	1	1	2

Quarterfinals
(United States) GL Wrenn	6	6	6	4	3
(United States) K Collins	8	4	4	6	6

Preceded by 1899 Wimbledon Championships – Men's Singles	Grand Slam men's singles	Succeeded by 1900 Wimbledon Championships – Men's singles
