= 1899 U.S. National Championships (tennis) =

- Date: August 14–21 (M); June 21–24 (W)
- Edition: 19th
- Category: Grand Slam
- Surface: Grass
- Location: Newport, R.I., United States (M); Philadelphia, PA, United States (W)

Champions

Men's singles
- (United States) Malcolm Whitman

Women's singles
- (United States) Marion Jones

Men's doubles
- (United States) Holcombe Ward / (United States) Dwight Davis

Women's doubles
- (United States) Jane Craven / (United States) Myrtle McAteer

Mixed doubles
- (United States) Elizabeth Rastall / (United States) Albert Hoskins
- U.S. National Championships

The 1899 U.S. National Championships (now known as the US Open) was a tennis tournament that took place in June and August of 1899.The women's tournament was held from June 21 to June 24 on the outdoor grass courts at the Philadelphia Cricket Club in Philadelphia, Pennsylvania. The men's tournament was held from August 14 to August 21 on the outdoor grass courts at the Newport Casino in Newport, Rhode Island. It was the 19th U.S. National Championships and the second Grand Slam tournament of the year.

== Finals ==
=== Men's singles ===
(United States) Malcolm Whitman defeated (United States) J. Parmly Paret 6–1, 6–2, 3–6, 7–5

=== Women's singles ===
(United States) Marion Jones defeated (United States) Maud Banks 6–1, 6–1, 7–5

=== Men's doubles ===
(United States) Holcombe Ward / (United States) Dwight Davis defeated (United States) Leo Ware / (United States) George Sheldon 6–4, 6–4, 6–3

=== Women's doubles ===
(United States) Jane Craven / (United States) Myrtle McAteer defeated (United States) Maud Banks / (United States) Elizabeth Rastall 6–1, 6–1, 7–5

=== Mixed doubles ===
(United States) Elizabeth Rastall / (United States) Albert Hoskins defeated (United States) Jane Craven / (United States) James Gardner 6–4, 6–0, ret.

Preceded by 1899 Wimbledon Championships	Grand Slams	Succeeded by 1900 Wimbledon Championships
