= Richard Hooker (disambiguation) =

Richard Hooker (1554–1600) was an English priest and theologian.

Richard Hooker may also refer to:

- Richard Hooker (author) (1924–1997), American writer and surgeon
- Richard Hooker (tennis), played in 1898 U.S. National Championships – Men's Singles

== See also ==
- Richard Hooker Wilmer (1816–1900), bishop of Alabama
