= 1898 U.S. National Championships – Men's singles =

Men's singles
- 1898 U.S. National Championships

Final
- Champion: (United States) Malcolm D. Whitman
- Runner-up: (United States) Robert Wrenn
- Score: w/o

Events
Singles	men	women
Doubles	men	women
← 1897 ·	U.S. National Championships	· 1899 →

Malcolm Whitman defeated Dwight F. Davis in the All Comers final, 3–6, 6–2, 6–2, 6–1 to win the men's singles tennis title at the 1898 U.S. National Championships. Two-time reigning champion Robert Wrenn did not defend his title.

== Draw ==
=== Challenge round ===
Challenge round
(United States) R Wrenn
(United States) MD Whitman	w/o

=== Finals ===
Semifinals
(United States) WS Bond	13	4	3
(United States) D Davis	11	6	6
(United States) LE Ware	2	0	2
(United States) MD Whitman	6	6	6

Final
(United States) D Davis	6	2	2	1
(United States) MD Whitman	3	6	6	6

=== Earlier rounds ===
==== Section 1 ====
First round
(United States) H Ward	6	2	4
(United States) G Sheldon	3	6	6	r
(United States) RH Carleton	6	6	6
(United States) C Whitbeck	1	4	1
(United States) H Hackett	6	7	8
(United States) R Hooker	2	5	6

Second round
(United States) BS Harris	0	2	0
(United States) WS Bond	6	6	6
(United States) RD Little	2	2	2
J Forbes	6	6	6
WS Clough
(United States) H Ward	w/o
(United States) RH Carleton	4	2	2
(United States) H Hackett	6	6	6

Third round
(United States) WS Bond	6	6	6
J Forbes	1	3	1
(United States) H Ward	6	6	3	6
(United States) H Hackett	2	3	6	0

Quarterfinals
(United States) WS Bond	6	6	6
(United States) H Ward	3	3	4

==== Section 2 ====
First round
(United States) H Avery	w/o
(United States) GS Keyes
(United States) S Ware	w/o
(United States) H Foulke
(United States) G Belden	6	6	6
(United States) ER Marvin	2	2	3
(United States) R Stevens	6	6	2	6
(United States) GH Miles	0	4	6	2
(United States) JC Davidson	6	6	6
(United States) SA Cushman	3	1	3
(United States) D Davis	6	8	6
(United States) H Plummer	2	6	0
(United States) A Codman	5	6	7	6
(United States) T Gross	7	3	5	3
EA Freshman	w/o
(United States) D Miller

Second round
(United States) H Avery	3	4	6	6	4
(United States) S Ware	6	6	1	3	6
(United States) G Belden	4	0	6	4
(United States) R Stevens	6	6	4	6
(United States) JC Davidson	6	1	3	4
(United States) D Davis	4	6	6	6
(United States) A Codman	6	7	6
EA Freshman	2	5	0

Third round
(United States) S Ware	1	3	1
(United States) R Stevens	6	6	6
(United States) D Davis	6	6	6	6
(United States) A Codman	8	4	2	2

Quarterfinals
(United States) R Stevens	6	4	5
(United States) D Davis	8	6	7

==== Section 3 ====
First round
(United States) L Fitzgerald	w/o
(United States) LJ Grant
(United States) LE Ware	6	6	6
(United States) EP Fischer	2	3	1
(United States) W Clothier	6	6	6
(United States) E Stille	4	3	4
(United States) S Millett	4	6	6	6
(United States) H Cole	6	4	0	4
GW Lee	5	5	6
(United States) WKAuchincloss	2	2	4
(United States) J Bramhall	6	6	6
(United States) CO Wheeler	1	3	2
(United States) HL Ewer	6	6	6
(United States) LH Cook	2	2	4
JK Willing	w/o
(United States) WC Grant

Second round
(United States) L Fitzgerald
(United States) LE Ware	w/o
(United States) W Clothier	6	7	2	1	0
(United States) S Millett	2	5	6	6	6
GW Lee	6	6	6
(United States) J Bramhall	2	1	1
(United States) HL Ewer	7	4	6	6
JK Willing	5	6	4	3

Third round
(United States) LE Ware	6	6	6
(United States) S Millett	3	0	1
GW Lee	9	7	3	7	6
(United States) HL Ewer	7	9	6	5	1

Quarterfinals
(United States) LE Ware	6	6	6
GW Lee	2	3	4

==== Section 4 ====
First round
(United States) MD Whitman	6	6	6
(United States) JF Brice	1	0	0
(United States) WD Brownell	6	6	2	6
(United States) D Emery	4	3	6	0

Second round
(United States) MD Whitman	6	6	6
(United States) WD Brownell	0	2	2
(United States) GL Wrenn	8	6	6
(United States) J Talmage	6	1	3
(United States) B Wright	4	3	4
(United States) CR Budlong	6	6	6
(United States) J Parmly Paret	9	6	6
(United States) R McKittrick	7	4	3

Third round
(United States) MD Whitman	6	6	6
(United States) GL Wrenn	2	1	1
(United States) CR Budlong	5	3	5	6	6
(United States) J Parmly Paret	1	6	7	3	4

Quarterfinals
(United States) MD Whitman	11	4	6	8
(United States) CR Budlong	9	6	2	6

Preceded by 1897 Wimbledon Championships – Men's Singles	Grand Slam men's singles	Succeeded by 1898 Wimbledon Championships – Men's singles
