= 1900 U.S. National Championships – Men's singles =

Men's singles
- 1900 U.S. National Championships

Final
- Champion: (United States) Malcolm Whitman
- Runner-up: (United States) William Larned
- Score: 6–4, 1–6, 6–2, 6–2

Events
Singles	men	women
Doubles	men	women
- U.S. National Championships

Two-time defending champion Malcolm Whitman defeated William Larned in the challenge round, 6–4, 1–6, 6–2, 6–2 to win the men's singles tennis title at the 1900 U.S. National Championships. The event was held at the Newport Casino in Newport, R.I., United States.

Larned had defeated George Wrenn in the All Comers' Final.

== Draw ==
=== Challenge round ===
Challenge Round
(United States) Malcolm Whitman	6	1	6	6
(United States) William Larned	4	6	2	2

=== Final eight ===
Quarterfinals
(United States) Dwight Davis	6	6	6	3	2
(United States) Beals Wright	4	4	8	6	6
(United States) Malcolm Chace	1	1	6	0
(United States) William Larned	6	6	4	6
(United Kingdom) Arthur Gore	6	7	6
(United Kingdom) Ernest Black	0	5	0
(United States) George Wrenn	6	6	6
(United States) Robert Wrenn	4	1	1

Semifinals
(United States) Beals Wright	9	6	6	3
(United States) William Larned	11	8	1	6
(United Kingdom) Arthur Gore	7	6	6	2	2
(United States) George Wrenn	9	1	0	6	6

Finals
(United States) William Larned	6	6	6
(United States) George Wrenn	3	2	2

=== Earlier rounds ===
==== Section 1 ====
First round
(United States) K Horton	2	9	8	6
(United States) RC Thomas	6	7	6	4
(United States) K Collins	5	6	7	7
(United States) J Parmly Paret	7	1	5	5
(United States) LE Ware	6	6	6
(United States) IC Wright	2	4	2
(United States) BC Wright	6	6	6
(United States) HE Foster	1	1	2

Second round
(United States) D Davis	6	6	6
(United States) H Avery	0	3	1
(United States) J Appleton Allen	w/	o
(United States) LDT Quimby
(United States) K Horton	2	4	0
(United States) K Collins	6	6	6
(United States) LE Ware	3	2	4
(United States) BC Wright	6	6	6

Third round
(United States) D Davis	6	0	6	7
(United States) J Appleton Allen	4	6	4	5
(United States) K Collins	3	6	6	3	4
(United States) BC Wright	6	1	4	6	6

Quarterfinals
(United States) D Davis	6	6	6	3	2
(United States) BC Wright	4	4	8	6	6

==== Section 2 ====
First round
GW Lee	3	6	4	7	6
(United States) GS Keyes	6	2	6	5	3
(United States) F Alexander	6	6	6
C Schley	3	1	2
(United States) M Chace	6	6	0	6
(United States) A Codman	0	1	6	2
(United States) EP Fischer	2	7	6	6
(United States) LH Waidner	6	5	4	3
(United States) S Hardy	w/	o
(United States) HH Hunnewell
(United States) SC Williams	w/	o
(United States) WA Warnock
(United States) W Larned	6	6	6
(United States) RH Allen	0	0	2
(United States) JD Pell	w/	o
(United States) JC Davidson

Second round
GW Lee	2	3	4
(United States) F Alexander	6	6	6
(United States) M Chace	3	6	6	4	6
(United States) EP Fischer	6	2	3	6	4
(United States) S Hardy	w/	o
(United States) SC Williams
(United States) W Larned	6	6	6
(United States) JD Pell	0	1	0

Third round
(United States) F Alexander	2	3	2
(United States) M Chace	6	6	6
(United States) S Hardy	1	1	3
(United States) W Larned	6	6	6

Quarterfinals
(United States) M Chace	1	1	6	0
(United States) W Larned	6	6	4	6

==== Section 3 ====
First round
HC Clews	w/	o
(United States) R Peters
(United Kingdom) A Gore	w/	o
HM Ashe
(United States) H Ward	w/	o
HN Rawlins
(United States) W Clothier	w/	o
(United States) C Angier
(United States) CR Budlong	6	6	6
EA Taft	0	0	2
AF Fuller	w/	o
(United States) E Stille
(United Kingdom) E Black	w/	o
H Thornton
(United States) S Hardy	6	7	6
WE Putnam	2	5	2

Second round
HC Clews	0	0	0
(United Kingdom) A Gore	6	6	6
(United States) H Ward	6	6	7
(United States) W Clothier	4	3	5
(United States) CR Budlong	6	6	6
AF Fuller	1	2	1
(United Kingdom) E Black	6	3	6	3	6
(United States) S Hardy	2	6	3	6	2

Third round
(United Kingdom) A Gore	6	2	3	7	6
(United States) H Ward	1	6	6	5	3
(United States) CR Budlong	6	6	4	11	4
(United Kingdom) E Black	8	2	6	6	6

Quarterfinals
(United Kingdom) A Gore	6	7	6
(United Kingdom) E Black	0	5	0

==== Section 4 ====
First round
(United States) H Hackett	6	6	6
(United States) H Plummer	4	0	4
(United States) GL Wrenn	w/	o
W Friedman
(United States) J Ryerson	6	6	6
EP Kirkland	1	2	3

Second round
(United States) H Hackett	1	6	7	4
(United States) GL Wrenn	6	4	9	6
(United States) J Ryerson	0	1	6	2
(United States) RD Little	6	6	3	6
(United States) D Miller
H Stevens	w/	o
(United States) R Wrenn	6	6	6
(United States) JR Carpenter	3	0	1

Third round
(United States) GL Wrenn	1	6	6	6
(United States) RD Little	6	2	0	2
H Stevens	0	1	5
(United States) R Wrenn	6	6	7

Quarterfinals
(United States) GL Wrenn	6	6	6
(United States) R Wrenn	4	1	4

Preceded by 1900 Wimbledon Championships – Men's Singles	Grand Slam men's singles	Succeeded by 1901 Wimbledon Championships – Men's singles
