= West Superior Invitation =

Defunct tennis tournament
- Tour: USNLTA Circuit
- Founded: 1895
- Abolished: 1899
- Location: West Superior, Wisconsin, United States
- Surface: Clay / outdoor

The West Superior Invitation was a men's clay court tennis tournament first held on courts at the West Superior Lawn Tennis Club, West Superior, Wisconsin, United States from 1895 to 1899. The event operated in a round robin tournament format. It was an officially sanctioned event of the United States National Lawn Tennis Association. The 1897 edition was won by William Scott Bond who was the U.S. No 10 ranked player, the following season he would rise to No.3.

== Finals ==
=== Singles ===
(incomplete roll)

| Year | Champions | Runners-up | Score |
|---|---|---|---|
| 1897 | (United States) William S. Bond | (United States) Walter A. Bethel | won. |
