= 1900 International Lawn Tennis Challenge =

1900 edition of the International Lawn Tennis Challenge

Details
- Duration: 8 – 10 August 1900
- Edition: 1st
- Teams: 2

Champion
- Winning nation: United States

The 1900 International Lawn Tennis Challenge was the first edition of what is now known as the Davis Cup.

== History ==
The tournament was conceived in 1899 by four members of the Harvard University tennis team, who came up with the idea of challenging the British to a tennis competition. Once the idea received the go-ahead from the United States Lawn Tennis Association and the British Lawn Tennis Association, Dwight F. Davis, one of the four Harvard players, designed a tournament format and spent money from his own pocket to purchase an appropriate sterling silver trophy from Shreve, Crump & Low. The first match between the United States and the British Isles was held at the Longwood Cricket Club in Boston, Massachusetts in 1900. The American team, of which Davis was a part, won the first three matches and the Challenge.

== Teams ==
=== United States ===
- Dwight Davis: A left-hander who possessed the twist serve, backing this up with steady ground strokes and volleys. In 1899, Davis won the Intercollegiate and US National Doubles Championships with Ward.
- Holcombe Ward: A right-hander and credited with originating the twist serve. He won the Intercollegiate and US National Doubles Championships with Davis in 1899.
- Malcolm Whitman: A right-hander who appeared in the quarterfinals of the 1896 and 1897 US National Championships and won in 1898, defeating Dwight F. Davis in the all-comers final and receiving the title because 1897 champion Robert Wrenn was fighting in the Spanish–American War. Prior to the Challenge he had placed in the U.S. Top 10 three times, and was ranked No. 1 in 1898 and 1899.

=== British Isles ===
- Ernest Black
- Arthur Gore: A right-hander who appeared in the semifinals of the 1898 Wimbledon Championships, the Challenge Round of the 1899 Championships – losing to Reginald Doherty – and the all-comers final of the 1900 Championships, losing to Sydney Smith.
- Herbert Roper Barrett: A right-hander who appeared in the semifinals of the 1899 Wimbledon Championships and the quarterfinals of the 1900 Championships. He also teamed with Harold Nisbet to reach the Challenge Round in the doubles at the latter Championships, losing to Laurence and Reginald Doherty.

== Result ==
United States vs. British Isles

United States
3
Longwood Cricket Club, Boston, MA, United States
8–10 August 1900
Grass

British Isles
0

			1	2	3	4	5
1	(United States) (United Kingdom)	Dwight Davis; Ernest Black	4; 6	6; 2	6; 4	6; 4
2	(United States) (United Kingdom)	Malcolm Whitman; Arthur Gore	6; 1	6; 3	6; 2
3	(United States) (United Kingdom)	Dwight Davis / Holcombe Ward; Ernest Black / Herbert Roper Barrett	6; 4	6; 4	6; 4
4	(United States) (United Kingdom)	Dwight Davis; Arthur Gore	9; 7	9; 9				not completed
5	(United States) (United Kingdom)	Malcolm Whitman; Ernest Black						not played
