= Ernest Black =

British tennis player

- Full name: Ernest Douglas Black
- Country (sports): United Kingdom
- Born: 14 June 1876 Sheffield, Yorkshire, England
- Died: 13 February 1931 (aged 54) Halifax, Nova Scotia, Canada
- Turned pro: 1893 (amateur)
- Retired: 1923

Singles
- Career record: 143/61 (70.4%)
- Career titles: 11

Grand Slam singles results
- Wimbledon: 2R (1921)
- US Open: QF (1900)

Team competitions
- Davis Cup: F (1900)

Captain Ernest Douglas Black (14 June 1876 – 13 February 1931) was a British tennis player active in the late 19th century and early 20th century.

== Tennis career ==
Black reached the quarterfinals of the U.S. National Championships in 1900, losing to the only other competing British player, future three-time Wimbledon champion Arthur Gore. He competed in the very first edition of the Davis Cup (then known as the International Lawn Tennis Challenge) in 1900.

He immigrated to Canada and was the Nova Scotia champion.

== Later life ==
Black, the son of Scottish parents, worked as an engineer. He served in the Canadian Expeditionary Force in the First World War. In 1917, he married Mary Agnes Cayzer, daughter of Sir Charles Cayzer, 1st Baronet and sister of Herbert Cayzer, 1st Baron Rotherwick. He died in 1931 in Halifax, Nova Scotia.
