= Elizabeth Rastall =

American tennis player

Elizabeth J. Rastall was an American female tennis player who was active at the turn of the 19th and 20th century.

== Career ==
Rastall won the mixed doubles title at the U.S. Championships in 1902. Together with her partner Albert Hoskins they defeated Jane Craven and James Gardner.

== Grand Slam finals ==
=== Doubles (2 runner-ups) ===
Result	Year	Championship	Surface	Partner	Opponents	Score
Loss	1897	U.S. Championships	Grass	(United States) Mrs. F. Edwards	(United States) Juliette Atkinson (United States) Kathleen Atkinson	2–6, 1–6, 1–6
Loss	1899	U.S. Championships	Grass	(United States) Maud Banks	(United States) Jane Craven (United States) Myrtle McAteer	1–6, 1–6, 5–7

=== Mixed doubles (1 title, 1 runner-up) ===
Result	Year	Championship	Surface	Partner	Opponents	Score
Win	1899	U.S. Championships	Grass	(United States) Albert Hoskins	(United States) Jane Craven (United States) James P. Gardner	6–4, 6–0, def.
Loss	1902	U.S. Championships	Grass	(United States) Albert Hoskins	(United States) Elisabeth Moore (United States) Wylie Grant	2–6, 1–6
