= William S. Bond (tennis) =

American tennis player

William Bond
- Full name: William Scott Bond
- Country (sports): United States
- Born: May 9, 1876. Chicago, Illinois, United States
- Died: August 2, 1951 (aged 75); Chicago, United States
- Turned pro: 1897 (amateur)
- Retired: 1901

Singles
- Career record: 59-22 (72.8%)
- Career titles: 4

Grand Slam singles results
- US Open: SF (1898)

William Scott Bond (May 9, 1876 – August 2, 1951) was an American former U.S. No 3. ranked tennis player. He was a semi finalist at the 1898 U.S. National Championships. He was active from 1897 to 1901 and won 4 singles titles.

== Tennis career ==
He played and won his first tournament in 1897 at the West Superior Invitation held in West Superior, Illinois. The same year he played at the U.S. National Championships for the first time where he lost in the second round to Edwin Fischer.

In 1898 he was a finalist at the Western States Championships losing to Kreigh Collins. He made it to the semi finals stage of the U.S. Championship that season, but lost to Dwight F. Davis.

He won the Niagara International Championship tournament at Niagara-on-the-Lake in Canada twice in 1897 and 1898.

In 1899 he reached the quarter finals of the U.S. Championship's that year losing to Dwight Filley Davis, and won his fourth and final title at the Chicago Invitation held at the Kenwood Country Club.

In 1901 he played his final singles event at the Niagara International where he went out in the quarter finals.
