= Jane Craven =

American tennis player, physician, World War I ambulance driver and medic, nun

Jane Wells Craven
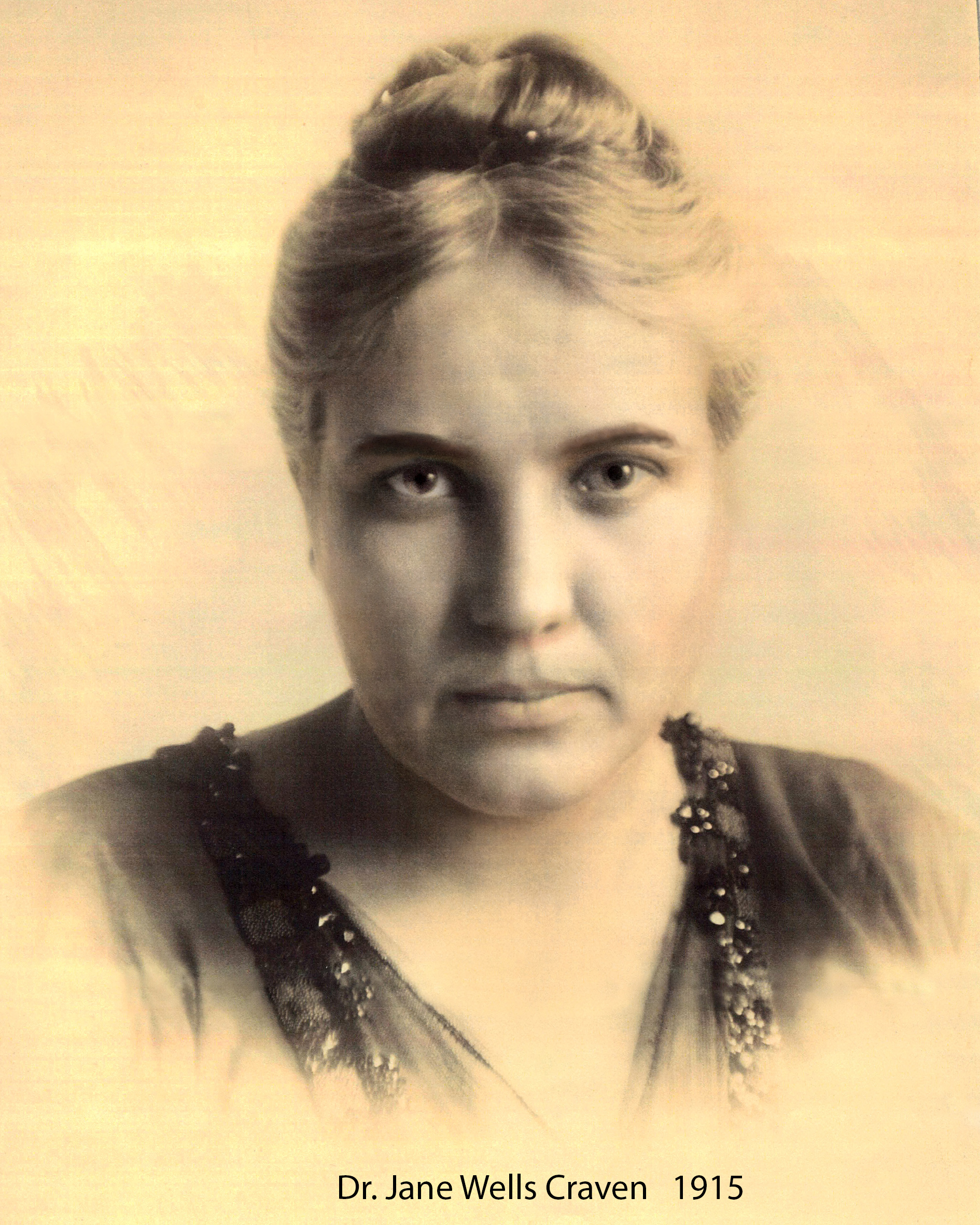
- Craven in 1915
- Born: January 25, 1875; Lucknow, India
- Died: March 3, 1958 (aged 83)
- Other names: Sister Elizabeth
- Education: Northwestern University; American School of Osteopathy
- Occupations: physician, tennis player, WWI ambulance driver, nun

Jane Wells Craven (January 25, 1875 - March 3, 1958) was an American doctor, prize-winning tennis player, World War I ambulance driver and medic. Craven won the 1899 U.S. National Championships in women's doubles tennis, alongside her teammate Myrtle McAteer. She was awarded the Croix de Guerre in 1917 for her medical service in France during World War I. She later became a Roman Catholic nun and took the name Sister Elizabeth.

== Early life and education ==
Jane Wells Craven was born on 25 January 1875 in Lucknow, India, to Jane Maria (née Wells) (died 1914) and Reverend Thomas Craven. Her parents married in 1870, her mother was from New York state and her father was a Welsh-born Methodist Missionary. "Jennie," as she was known in the family, had three siblings: Theodora (born 1872), Henry (born 1874) and Merritt (born 1876).

The Craven family immigrated to the United States in 1879 and had settled in Evanston, Illinois, by 1880, where Jane Wells Craven attended Evanston Township high school. She studied medicine at Northwestern University in Evanston, graduating around 1898 with a Doctor of Osteopathic Medicine (D.O.) degree from the American School of Osteopathy. Her siblings Theodora and Henry also attended Northwestern.

Craven eventually began playing lawn tennis and won the 1899 US Women's National Championship in women's doubles with Myrtle McAteer. They later played together on 30 June 1909 and won a qualifying match in the Western Pennsylvania Tennis Association tournament.

In 1900, Craven narrowly escaped marrying a serial bigamist when one of his wives wrote to her and warned her of the situation. She replied "Thank you for your warning. Have learned the truth in time".

== Medical career ==
By 1899, Craven was living and working in osteopathic medicine in Pittsburgh, Pennsylvania, as listed in the city's directory.

By 1905, Craven had returned to her birthplace of Lucknow in India and was using her medical expertise to help to plague victims there. She spoke Hindi. Before 1910, she worked in Egypt, again as part of medical teams fighting contagious diseases and plague. By 1911, Craven had returned to Pittsburgh, when she was runner-up to Hazel Hotchkiss in a tennis event.

Whilst living in Pittsburgh, Craven visited the Iron City Fishing Club in Moon Bay, Woods Bay in the Massasauga Provincial Park, Ontario, Canada. She purchased Island B69 in 1912, built a cottage on it and called it Dilkusha, from Hindi. Craven sold the island in 1920, having reportedly found solace there from the traumas of her medical work in World War One.

== World War One ==
Craven was instrumental in raising funds in Pittsburgh to take a field ambulance and crew to the French front during World War I. She intended to drive the ambulance herself. Despite her qualifications as a doctor, she served as a nurse close to the front lines. At the time, doctors of osteopathy weren't allowed to join the US Military Medical Corps. It was reported that "she narrowly escaped being captured by the Germans" on more than one occasion and that "her courage gained the admiration of the General Commander of Verdun", Auguste Hirschauer.

In December 1917, she was awarded the Croix de Guerre for her work during the war. She is thought to be the first American woman to be honored with the award.

== Conversion and becoming a nun ==
Craven was born into a Protestant family, but formally converted to Catholicism soon after surviving her experiences during the First World War. General Auguste Hirschauer stood as godfather at her baptism. She joined the Daughters of Charity of Saint Vincent de Paul under the name of Sister Elizabeth. Initially based in France in the commune of Neuilly in the western suburbs of Paris, her role in the sisterhood was to care for the incurably sick and infirm. She later worked in Istanbul, Turkey, in the early 1930s.

== Second World War ==
Sister Elizabeth was arrested three times by German invaders in France during the Second World War. She was known to have "expressed herself openly and freely" and was often called to the mayor's office at the Mairie, who warned her to be careful when expressing her opinions. She was arrested in Bayeux, but was released and travelled back to Paris with another nun in a car, driving past vast lines of German mechanized equipment. She was arrested for a second time on her arrival in Paris, and accused of espionage. Asked what she had observed on her journey, Sister Elizabeth offered such vague answers that she and her fellow nun were released by the Nazis.

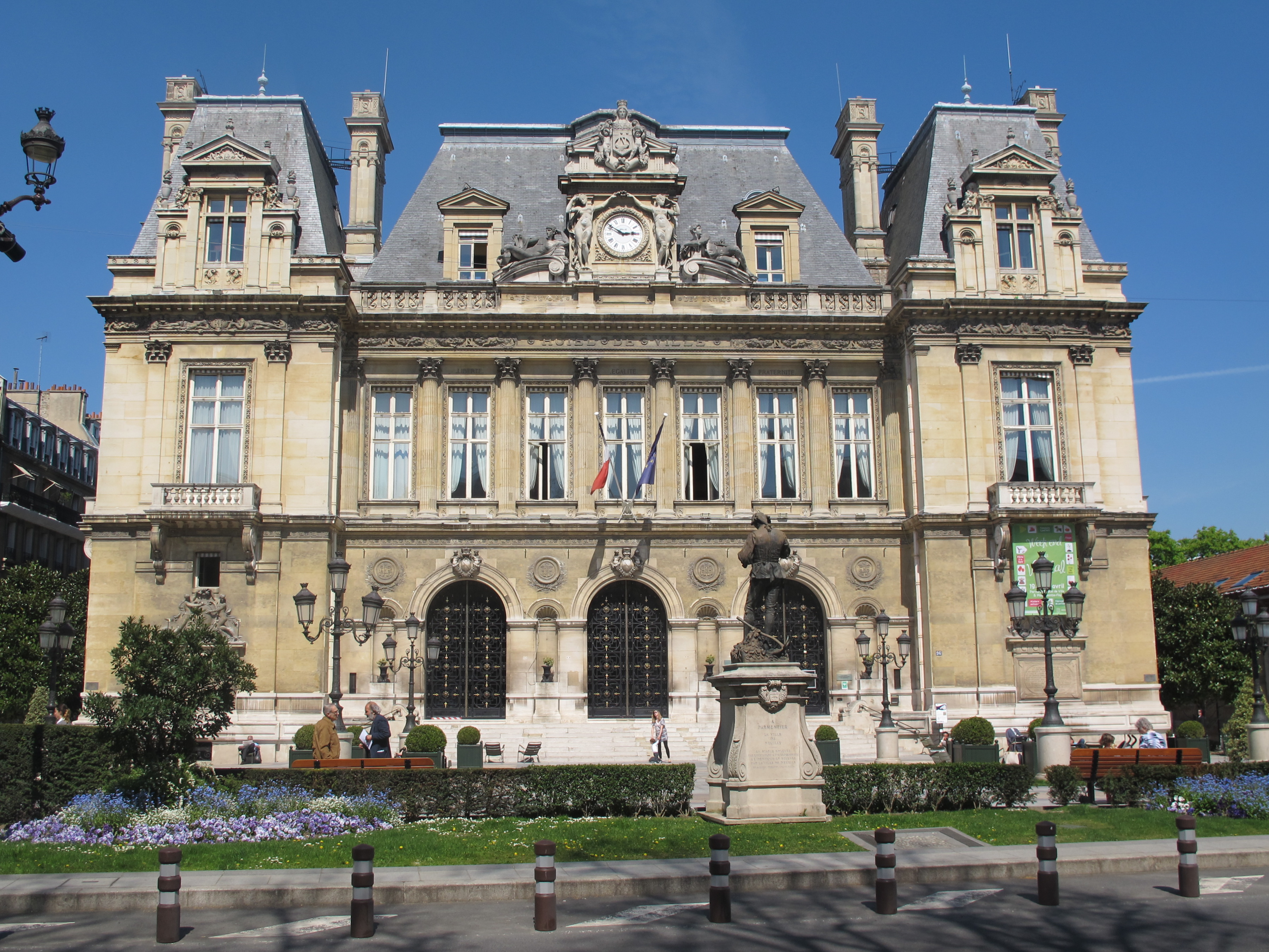
Mairie de Neuilly-sur-Seine

Sister Elizabeth's third arrested was during a round up of British and Canadian Religious by the occupying forces, with the intent of sending them to Besançon, in eastern France. She faked a serious illness, which led to her release.

The Daughters of Charity of Saint Vincent de Paul had a house at Arromanches, Normandy, connected to the community at Neuilly. A Mulberry harbour artificial port was installed there as part of the Invasion of Normandy in June 1944 and the town was subject to significant bombardments. Sister Elizabeth and another nun traveled there by car to rescue "a quantity of precious metal threatened with destruction", retrieving it safely and returning to Neuilly.

In the postwar era in 1947, Sister Elizabeth was asked to attend the mayor's office once more. On arrival, she asked: "What have I done now to be summoned again to the Town Hall?" to be met with the news she was to be awarded the Cross of the Legion of Honour. She was later presented with the medal at the same ceremony as Winston Churchill, Britain's wartime leader. His daughters had asked to be present to see the nun honored.

== Tennis ==
=== Grand Slam finals ===
==== Doubles (1 title) ====
Result	Year	Championship	Surface	Partner	Opponents	Score
Win	1899	U.S. National Championships	Grass	(United States) Myrtle McAteer	(United States) Maud Banks (United States) Elizabeth Rastall	6–1, 6–1, 7–5

==== Mixed doubles (1 runner-up) ====
Result	Year	Championship	Surface	Partner	Opponents	Score
Loss	1899	U.S. National Championships	Grass	(United States) James P. Gardner	(United States) Elizabeth Rastall (United States) Albert Hoskins	6–4, 6–0 & ab.

=== Other finals ===
==== Doubles (1 runner-up) ====
Result	Year	Tournament	Partner	Opponents	Score
Loss	1910	Cincinnati	(United States) Miriam Steever	(United States) Martha Kinsey (United States) Helen McLaughlin	6–1, 4–6, 3–6
