= George Wrenn =

American tennis player

- Full name: George Lawson Wrenn
- Country (sports): United States
- Born: July 2, 1875; Highland Park, Lake County, Illinois, U.S.
- Died: July 29, 1948 (aged 73); Long Island, New York, U.S.

Singles

Grand Slam singles results
- US Open: F (1900)

George Lawson Wrenn (July 2, 1875 – July 29, 1948) was an American tennis player active in the late 19th century and early 20th century.

== Tennis career ==
Wrenn reached the all-comers final of the U.S. National Championships in 1900 (beating his brother Robert and Arthur Gore before losing to William Larned) and the quarterfinals in 1896 and 1899.
