= Clarence R. Budlong =

American tennis player

Clarence Budlong
- Full name: Clarence Rhodes Budlong
- Country (sports): United States
- Born: September 3, 1874; Rhode Island
- Died: January 25, 1946 (aged 71); Providence, Rhode Island
- Turned pro: 1891 (amateur tour)
- Retired: 1902
- College: Brown University

Singles
- Career titles: 5

Grand Slam singles results
- US Open: QF (1895, 1898)

Clarence Rhodes Budlong (September 3, 1874 – January 25, 1946) was an American tennis player active in the late 19th century.

== Tennis career ==
Budlong reached the quarterfinals of the U.S. National Championships in 1895 and 1898.

He was a two time winner of the Rhode Island State Championships in 1898 and 1899.
