= Malcolm Whitman =

American tennis player

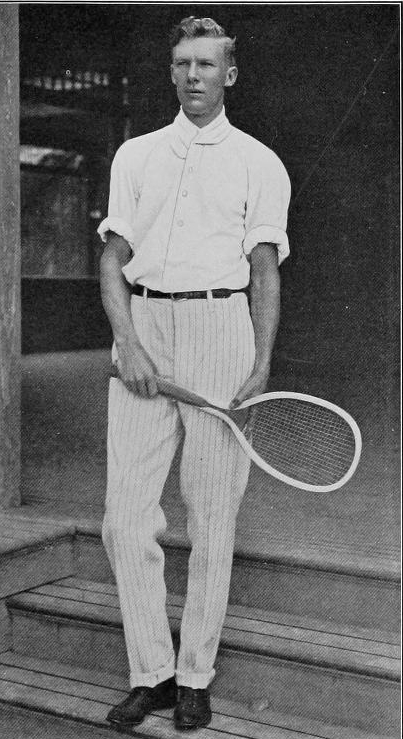
- Full name: Malcolm Douglass Whitman
- Country (sports): United States
- Born: March 15, 1877 New York City, United States
- Died: December 28, 1932 (aged 55) New York City, United States
- Height: 1.87 m (6 ft 2 in)
- Turned pro: 1896 (amateur tour)
- Retired: 1917
- Plays: Right-handed (one-handed backhand)
- Int. Tennis HoF: 1955 (member page)

Singles
- Career record: 110–28 (79.7%)
- Career titles: 17
- Highest ranking: No. 1 (1900, ITHF)

Grand Slam singles results
- US Open: W (1898, 1899, 1900)

Team competitions
- Davis Cup: W (1900, 1902)

Malcolm "Mal" Douglass Whitman (March 15, 1877 – December 28, 1932) was an American tennis player who won three singles titles at the U.S. National Championships.

== Biography ==
He graduated from The Roxbury Latin School, where he is celebrated as one of its greatest athletes. Whitman was American intercollegiate singles tennis champion in 1896 and doubles champion in 1897 and 1898 as a student at Harvard University. He graduated from Harvard Law School in 1899 and received his bachelor in law degree in 1902.

In 1896, Whitman entered his first U.S. National Championships at the Newport Casino and lost in the quarterfinals to Bill Larned. In 1897, he lost in the quarterfinals, this time against Harold Nisbet. Whitman is best known for this hat-trick of singles titles at the U.S. National Championships. Between 1898 and 1900, he stayed undefeated there. In 1901, he did not compete and in the 1902 Championships, and he lost in the All-Comers final to Englishman Reginald Doherty. According to the Doherty brothers, Malcolm Whitman and Bill Larned were at the time the best American singles players.

He played on the inaugural American Davis Cup squad in 1900 and beat Englishman Arthur Gore in Boston, Massachusetts to help his US team win the trophy. In the 1902 Davis Cup final against Great Britain in Brooklyn, he contributed to his team's win by defeating Joshua Pim and Reginald Doherty in the singles.

Whitman retired from tennis in 1902 at the age of 25. He was a member of the executive committee of the U.S. National Lawn Tennis Association and held management positions in several companies.

In 1932, he wrote a book on the origin of tennis titled Tennis - Origins and Mysteries.

== Grand Slam finals ==
=== Singles: 3 titles ===
Result	Year	Championship	Surface	Opponent	Score
Win	1898	U.S. National Championships	Grass	(United States) Dwight Davis	3–6, 6–2, 6–2, 6–1
Win	1899	U.S. National Championships	Grass	(United States) J. Parmly Paret	6–1, 6–2, 3–6, 7–5
Win	1900	U.S. National Championships	Grass	(United States) William Larned	6–4, 1–6, 6–2, 6–2

== Playing style ==
In their book R.F. and H.L. Doherty - On Lawn Tennis (1903) multiple Wimbledon champions Reginald and Lawrence Doherty described Whitman's playing style:

Whitman is very safe everywhere, and has not a weak point. We believe he has only been beaten once in the last five years. Perhaps his backhand is almost as good as his forehand. He plays the volleying game, as nearly all the Americans do, and gets up to the net on every possible occasion, and when at the net is very hard to pass. He is wonderfully sure on his volley and, besides, has an enormous reach, and is very active and severe overhead. On the ground he plays rather a soft but still an accurate game, and gets more pace on the ball than he seems to. His length is always excellent. He hits the ball rather low, and passes well. And he has that supreme merit - that he rarely misses easy strokes.

— On Lawn Tennis - 1903

== Personal life ==
Whitman married his first wife, Janet McCook in 1907. She died in December 1909 after the birth of their second child. In July 1912, Whitman married Jennie Adeline Crocker but they divorced in 1924. In 1926, Whitman married Lucilla Mara de Vescovi, known as the Countess Mara. In December 1931, his daughter Mary, 16, from his second marriage, died of pneumonia. On December 28, 1932, Whitman committed suicide by jumping off an apartment building in New York after a nervous breakdown.

== Bibliography ==
- Malcolm Douglass Whitman: Tennis Origins and Mysteries. With an historical bibliography by Robert W. Henderson. Derrydale Press, New York NY 1932, (ISBN 0-486-43357-9).
- Malcolm D. Whitman: "Fly Fishing Up to Date. Privately printed by The Plimpton Press, Norwood, Mass 1924
- Malcolm D. Whitman, writing under the pseudonym Icarus de Plume: "The Island of Elcadar" Marshall Jones Co., Boston 1921
