= J. Parmly Paret =

American tennis player and writer

Jahial Parmly Paret
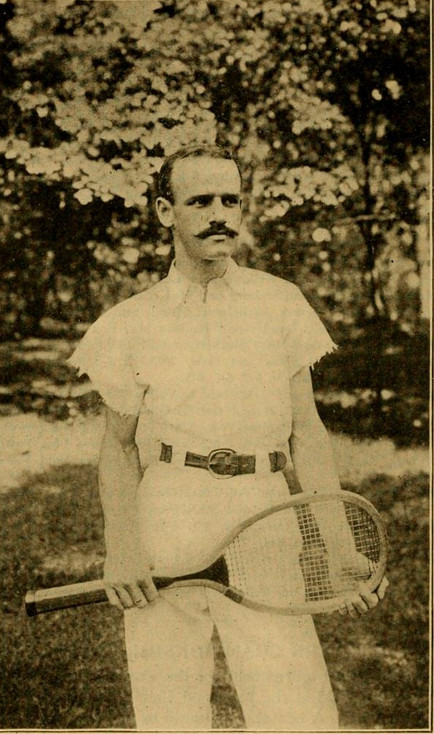
- Paret, c. 1899
- Country (sports): United States
- Born: October 3, 1870; Bayonne, New Jersey, USA
- Died: November 24, 1952 (aged 82); Pasadena, Los Angeles, USA
- Turned pro: 1889 (amateur tour)
- Retired: 1903

Singles
- Career record: 201–83 (70.7%)
- Career titles: 15

Grand Slam singles results
- Wimbledon: 2R (1898)
- US Open: F (1899^{Ch})

Doubles

Grand Slam doubles results
- Wimbledon: 1R (1898)

Jahial "John" Parmly Paret (October 3, 1870 – November 24, 1952) was a tennis player and writer from the United States.

Paret won the All-Comers final, but finished runner-up to Malcolm Whitman in the Challenge Round of the U.S. National Championships men's singles event, in 1899. He also reached the quarterfinals in 1897. The biggest title win of his career came at the 1902 U.S. National Indoor Championships where he defeated Wylie Grant.

Parmly Paret became the author or several books about tennis technique and strategy, including Lawn Tennis : its Past, Present, and Future (1904), Methods and Players of Modern Lawn Tennis (1915) and Mechanics of the Game of Lawn Tennis (1926).

== Grand Slam finals ==
=== Singles (1 runner-up) ===
Result	Year	Championship	Surface	Opponent	Score
Loss	1899	U.S. National Championships	Grass	(United States) Malcolm Whitman	1–6, 2–6, 6–3, 5–7
