= 1902 in tennis =

This page covers all the important events in the sport of tennis in 1902. It provides the results of notable tournaments throughout the year on both the men's and women's ILTF tennis circuits.

== Australian Open ==
No event.

== French Open ==
Not a Grand Slam event.

== Wimbledon ==
Category	Champion(s)	Finalist(s)	Score
Men's singles	(United Kingdom of Great Britain and Ireland) Laurence Doherty	(United Kingdom of Great Britain and Ireland) Arthur Gore	6–4, 6–3, 3–6, 6–0
Women's singles	(United Kingdom of Great Britain and Ireland) Muriel Robb	(United Kingdom of Great Britain and Ireland) Charlotte Sterry	7–5, 6–1
Men's doubles	(United Kingdom of Great Britain and Ireland) Frank Riseley (United Kingdom of Great Britain and Ireland) Sydney Smith	(United Kingdom of Great Britain and Ireland) Laurence Doherty (United Kingdom of Great Britain and Ireland) Reginald Doherty	4–6, 8–6, 6–3, 4–6, 11–9

== US Open ==
Category	Champion(s)	Finalist(s)	Score
Men's singles	(United States) William Larned	(United Kingdom) Reginald Doherty	4–6, 6–2, 6–4, 8–6
Women's singles	(United States) Marion Jones	(United States) Elisabeth Moore	6–1, 1–0, ret.
Men's doubles	(United Kingdom) Reginald Doherty (United Kingdom) Laurence Doherty	(United States) Holcombe Ward (United States) Dwight F. Davis	11–9, 12–10, 6–4
Women's doubles	(United States) Juliette Atkinson (United States) Marion Jones	(United States) Maud Banks (United States) Winona Closterman	6–2, 7–5
Mixed doubles	(United States) Elisabeth Moore (United States) Wylie Grant	(United States) Elizabeth Rastall (United States) Albert Hoskins	6–2, 6–1
