= 1903 in tennis =

This page covers all the important events in the sport of tennis in 1903. It provides the results of notable tournaments throughout the year on both the men's and women's ILTF tennis circuits.

== Australian Open ==
No event.

== French Open ==
Not a Grand Slam event.

== Wimbledon ==
Category	Champion(s)	Finalist(s)	Score
Men's singles	(United Kingdom of Great Britain and Ireland) Laurence Doherty	(United Kingdom of Great Britain and Ireland) Frank Riseley	7–5, 6–3, 6–0
Women's singles	(United Kingdom of Great Britain and Ireland) Dorothea Douglass	(United Kingdom of Great Britain and Ireland) Ethel Thomson	4–6, 6–4, 6–2
Men's doubles	(United Kingdom of Great Britain and Ireland) Laurence Doherty (United Kingdom of Great Britain and Ireland) Reginald Doherty	(United Kingdom of Great Britain and Ireland) Frank Riseley (United Kingdom of Great Britain and Ireland) Sydney Smith	6–4, 6–4, 6–4

== US Open ==
Category	Champion(s)	Finalist(s)	Score
Men's singles	(United Kingdom) Laurence Doherty	(United States) William Larned	6–0, 6–3, 10–8
Women's singles	(United States) Elisabeth Moore	(United States) Marion Jones	7–5, 8–6
Men's doubles	(United Kingdom) Reginald Doherty (United Kingdom) Laurence Doherty	(United States) Kreigh Collins (United States) Harry Wainder	7–5, 6–3, 6–3
Women's doubles	(United States) Elisabeth Moore (United States) Carrie Neely	(United States) Miriam Hall (United States) Marion Jones	4–6, 6–1, 6–1
Mixed doubles	(United States) Helen Chapman (United States) Harry Allen	(United States) Carrie Neely (United States) W. H. Rowland	6–4, 7–5
