= 1901 in tennis =

This page covers all the important events in the sport of tennis in 1901. It provides the results of notable tournaments throughout the year on both the men's and women's ILTF tennis circuits.

== Australian Open ==
No event.

== French Open ==
Not a Grand Slam event.

== Wimbledon ==
Category	Champion(s)	Finalist(s)	Score
Men's singles	(United Kingdom of Great Britain and Ireland) Arthur Gore	(United Kingdom of Great Britain and Ireland) Reginald Doherty	4–6, 7–5, 6–4, 6–4
Women's singles	(United Kingdom of Great Britain and Ireland) Charlotte Sterry	(United Kingdom of Great Britain and Ireland) Blanche Hillyard	6–2, 6–2
Men's doubles	(United Kingdom of Great Britain and Ireland) Laurence Doherty (United Kingdom of Great Britain and Ireland) Reginald Doherty	(United States) Dwight Davis (United States) Holcombe Ward	4–6, 6–2, 6–3, 9–7

== US Open ==
Category	Champion(s)	Finalist(s)	Score
Men's singles	(United States) William Larned	(United States) Beals Wright	6–2, 6–8, 6–4, 6–4
Women's singles	(United States) Elisabeth Moore	(United States) Myrtle McAteer	6–4, 3–6, 7–5, 2–6, 6–2
Men's doubles	(United States) Holcombe Ward (United States) Dwight Davis	(United States) Leo Ware (United States) Beals Wright	6–3, 9–7, 6–11
Women's doubles	(United States) Juliette Atkinson (United States) Myrtle McAteer	(United States) Marion Jones (United States) Elisabeth Moore	default
Mixed doubles	(United States) Marion Jones (United States) Raymond Little	(United States) Myrtle McAteer (United States) Clyde Stevens	6–4, 6–4, 7–5
