= List of female tennis players =

This is a list of female tennis players who meet one or more of the following criteria:

- Singles:
  - Officially ranked among the top 25 by the Women's Tennis Association (since 1975)
  - Ranked among the top 10 by an expert (e.g. A. Wallis Myers) before 1975
  - Reached the quarterfinals of a Grand Slam tournament
  - Reached the finals of or won the year-end championships
  - Won a medal at the Olympic Games
- Doubles:
  - Won a Grand Slam tournament or year-end championship
  - Officially ranked No. 1 by the WTA (since 1984)
  - Won a medal at the Olympic Games

== List ==
Name	Nationality	Birth	Death	Grand Slam singles titles	Notes
Betsy Abbas	Egypt				1960 French Championships quarterfinalist
Jane Albert	United States	1946			1965 Wimbledon quarterfinalist
Leslie Allen	United States	1957			Ranked world No. 21 in 1983
Lili de Álvarez Valdene	Spain	1905	1998		Ranked world No. 2 at the end of the year in 1927 and 1928 • 1926/1927/1928 Wimbledon runner-up
Sophie Amiach	France	1963			Singles: 1984 Australian Open quarterfinalist ◌ Doubles: 1980 Australian Open quarterfinalist
Josette Amouretti	France	1914	1990		1954 French Championships quarterfinalist
Mirra Andreeva	Russia	2007			2026 French Open champion • Ranked world No. 9 in singles and No. 28 in doubles in 2025
Bianca Andreescu	Canada	2000		1	Singles: ranked world No. 4 in 2019 • 2019 US Open champion
Sabine Appelmans	Belgium	1972			Ranked world No. 16 in singles and world No. 21 in doubles in 1997 ◌ Singles: 1997 Australian Open quarterfinalist
Laura Arraya (Gildemeister)	Argentina; Peru	1967			Ranked world No. 14 in singles in 1990 and world No. 27 in doubles in 1988
Jeanne Arth	United States	1935			Doubles: 1959 Wimbledon champion • 1956/1959 U.S. champion
Shinobu Asagoe	Japan	1976			Ranked world No. 21 in singles in 2005 and world No. 13 in doubles in 2006
Juliette Atkinson	United States	1873	1944	3	1895/1897/1898 U.S. Championships champion
Kathleen Atkinson	United States	1875	1957		Doubles: 1897/1898 U.S. Championships champion
Cilly Aussem	Germany	1909	1963	2	Ranked world No. 2 at the end of the year in 1930 and 1931 ◌ Singles: 1931 French champion • 1931 Wimbledon champion ◌ Mixed doubles: 1930 French champion
Tracy Austin	United States	1962		2	Ranked world No. 1 in 1980 ◌ Singles: 1979/1981 US Open champion • 1980 WTA Finals champion ◌ Mixed doubles: 1980 Wimbledon champion
Élisabeth d'Ayen	France	1898	1969		1920 Olympic bronze medalist in women's doubles
Victoria Azarenka	Belarus	1989		2	Ranked world No. 1 in singles in 2012 and world No. 7 in doubles in 2008 ◌ Singles: 2012/2013 Australian Open champion ◌ Mixed doubles: 2007 US Open champion • 2008 French Open champion
Tímea Babos	Hungary	1993			Ranked world No. 25 in singles in 2016 and world No. 1 in doubles in 2018
Timea Bacsinszky	Switzerland	1989			Ranked world No.9 in singles in 2016.
Paula Badosa	Spain	1997			Ranked world No. 2 in singles in 2022 • 2025 Australian Open Semifinalist
Dianne Fromholtz Balestrat	Australia	1956			Ranked world No. 4 in 1979 ◌ Doubles: 1977 Australian Open champion
Sybille Bammer	Austria	1980			Ranked world No. 19 in 2007
Maud Barger-Wallach	United States	1870	1954	1	1908 U.S. Championships champion
Sue Barker	United Kingdom	1956		1	Ranked world No. 3 • 1976 French Open champion
Pilar Barril	Spain	1931	2011		1961 French Championships quarterfinalist
Mona Barthel	Germany	1990			Ranked world No. 23 in singles in 2013 and world No. 63 in doubles in 2015
Jane Bartkowicz	United States	1949			Ranked world No. 8 at the end of the year in 1969
Marion Bartoli	France	1984		1	Ranked world No. 7 in singles in 2012 and world No. 15 in doubles in 2004 ◌ Singles: 2013 Wimbledon champion
Ashleigh Barty	Australia	1996		3	Singles: ranked world No. 1 in 2019/2020/2021 • 2019 French Open champion • 2021 Wimbledon champion • 2022 Australian Open champion • 2019 WTA Finals champion ◌ Doubles: ranked world No. 5 in doubles in 2018 • 2018 US Open champion
Carling Bassett-Seguso	Canada	1967			Ranked world No. 8 in 1985
Yayuk Basuki	Indonesia	1970			Ranked world No. 19 in singles in 1997 and world No. 9 in doubles in 1998
Joan Hartigan Bathurst	Australia	1912	2000	3	Ranked world No. 8 at the end of the year in 1934 ◌ Singles: 1933/1934/1936 Australian champion ◌ Mixed doubles: 1934 Australian champion
Norma Baylon	Argentina	1942			1964 Wimbledon quarterfinalist • 1965 French quarterfinalist • 1965/1966 U.S. quarterfinalist
Geraldine Beamish	United Kingdom	1885	1972		Ranked world No. 4 at the end of the year in 1923 • 1919/1922/1923 Wimbledon semifinalist • 1921 Wimbledon women's doubles runner-up • 1920 Olympic silver medalist in women's doubles
Claire Beckingham	United Kingdom				Singles: 1926 Wimbledon quarterfinalist
Dája Bedáňová	Czech Republic	1983			Ranked world No. 16 in singles and world No. 34 in doubles in 2002
Irina-Camelia Begu	Romania	1990			Ranked world No. 22 in singles and world No. 30 in doubles in 2016
Belinda Bencic	Switzerland	1997			Ranked world No. 7 in singles and world No. 59 in doubles in 2016 ◌ Singles: 2020 Olympic gold medalist • 2019 US Open semifinalist
Mirka Koželuhová	Czechoslovakia	1951			Singles: 1978 French Open quarterfinalist
Iveta Benešová	Czech Republic	1983			Ranked world No. 25 in singles in 2009 and world No. 17 in doubles in 2011
Kiki Bertens	Netherlands	1991			Ranked world No. 8 in singles in 2019 ◌ Singles: 2016 French open semifinalist and 2018 Wimbledon quarterfinalist
Pauline Betz Addie	United States	1919	2011	5	Ranked world No. 1 at the end of the year in 1946 • 1946 Wimbledon champion • 1942/1943/1944/1946 U.S. Championships champion ◌ Mixed doubles: 1946 French Championships champion
Louie Bickerton	Australia	1902	1998		Doubles: 1927/1929/1931 Australian Championships champion ◌ Mixed doubles: 1935 Australian Championships champion
Blanche Bingley Hillyard	United Kingdom	1863	1946	6	1886/1890/1894/1897/1899/1900 Wimbledon champion
Cara Black	Zimbabwe	1979			Ranked world No. 31 in singles in 1999 and world No. 1 in doubles in 2005 ◌ Doubles: 2007 Australian Open champion • 2004/2005/2007 Wimbledon champion • 2008 US Open champion ◌ Mixed doubles: 2010 Australian Open champion • 2003 French Open champion • 2004/2010 Wimbledon champion • 2008 US Open champion
Jill Blackman	Australia	1936			1963 French Championships quarterfinalist
Molly Blair	United Kingdom	1918	2004		1949 Wimbledon quarterfinalist
Manon Bollegraf	Netherlands	1964			Ranked world No. 29 in singles in 1990 and world No. 4 in doubles in 1990 ◌ Mixed doubles: 1997 Australian Open champion • 1989 French Open champion • 1991/1997 US Open champion
Nancye Wynne Bolton	Australia	1916	2001	6	Ranked world No. 4 at the end of the year in 1947 and 1948 • 1937/1940/1946/1947/1948/1951 Australian Championships champion ◌ Doubles: 1936/1937/1938/1939/1940/1947/1948/1949/1951/1952 Australian Championships champion ◌ Mixed doubles: 1940/1946/1947/1948 Australian Championships champion
Alona Bondarenko	Ukraine	1984			Ranked world No. 19 in singles in 2008 and world No. 11 in doubles in 2008 ◌ Doubles: 2008 Australian Open champion
Kateryna Bondarenko	Ukraine	1986			Ranked world No. 29 in singles in 2009 and world No. 9 in doubles in 2008 ◌ Doubles: 2008 Australian Open champion
Lisa Bonder-Kreiss	United States	1965			Ranked world No. 9 in 1984
Fiorella Bonicelli	Uruguay	1951			Doubles:1976 French Open champion ◌ Mixed doubles: 1975 French Open champion
Kristie Boogert	Netherlands	1973			Ranked world No. 29 in singles in 1996 and world No. 16 in doubles in 1997 ◌ Doubles: 2000 Olympic silver medalist ◌ Mixed doubles: 1994 French Open champion
Penelope Dora Boothby	United Kingdom	1881	1970	1	Singles: 1909 Wimbledon champion • 1908 Olympic silver medalist
Linky Boshoff	South Africa	1956			1974 Wimbledon quarterfinalist • 1977 French Open quarterfinalist
Annalisa Bossi	Italy	1915	2015		Singles: 1949 French semifinalist
Jean Bostock	United Kingdom	1922	1965		Ranked world No. 6 at the end of 1948 ◌ Singles: 1946 Wimbledon quarterfinalist
Eugenie Bouchard	Canada	1994			Ranked world No. 5 in singles in 2014 ◌ Singles: 2014 Wimbledon finalist
Kornelia Bouman	Netherlands	1903	1998	1	Ranked world No. 8 at the end of the year in 1928 • 1927 French champion ◌ Doubles: 1929 French champion ◌ Mixed doubles: 1924 Olympic bronze medalist
Elena Bovina	Russia	1983			Ranked world No. 14 in singles in 2005 and world No. 14 in doubles in 2003
Nicole (Provis) Bradtke	Australia	1969			Ranked world No. 24 in singles in 1993 and world No. 11 in doubles in 1992 • 1992 Olympic bronze medalist in women's doubles
Shirley Brasher	United Kingdom	1934		1	Ranked world No. 3 at the end of the year in 1957 • 1957 French Championships champion ◌ Doubles: 1957 French Championships champion ◌ Mixed doubles: 1958 French Championships champion
Heather Brewer-Segal	Bermuda	1931	2006		1955/1958 French Championships semifinalist
Marguerite Broquedis	France	1893	1983	2	1913/1914 French Championships champion ◌ Mixed doubles: 1911/1924 French Championships champion ◌ 1912 Olympic gold medalist in singles and bronze medalist in mixed doubles
Louise Brough	United States	1923	2014	6	Ranked world No. 1 at the end of the year in 1955 • 1947 U.S. Championships champion • 1950 Australian Championships champion • 1948/1949/1950/1955 Wimbledon champion ◌ Doubles: 1950 Australian Championships champion • 1946/1947/1949 French Championships champion • 1946/1948/1949/1950/1954 Wimbledon champion • 1942/1943/1944/1945/1946/1947/1948/1949/1950/1955/1956/1957 U.S. Championships champion ◌ Mixed doubles: 1946/1947/1948/1950 Wimbledon champion • 1942/1947/1948/1949 U.S. Championships champion
Mary Kendall Browne	United States	1891	1971	3	Ranked world No. 3 at the end of the year in 1921 • 1912/1913/1914 U.S. Championships champion ◌ Doubles: 1912/1913/1914/1921/1925 U.S. Championships champion • 1926 Wimbledon champion ◌ Mixed doubles: 1912/1913/1914/1921 U.S. Championships champion
Ginette Bucaille	France	1921	2021		Ranked world No. 10 at the end of the year 1954 • 1954 French Championships runner-up
Iva Budařová	Czech Republic	1960			Ranked world No. 24 in 1983
Edda Buding	West Germany	1936	2014		1959 Wimbledon quarterfinalist • 1956 French Championships quarterfinalist
Ilse Buding	West Germany	1939	2023		1956 French Championships quarterfinalist
Maria Bueno	Brazil	1939	2018	7	Ranked world No. 1 at the end of the year in 1959 and 1960 • 1959/1960/1964 Wimbledon champion • 1959/1963/1964/1966 U.S. Championships champion ◌ Doubles: 1958/1960/1963/1965/1966 Wimbledon champion • 1960/1962/1966/1968 U.S. Championships champion • 1960 Australian Championships champion • 1960 French Championships champion ◌ Mixed doubles: 1960 French Championships champion
Bettina Bunge	West Germany	1963			Ranked world No. 7 in 1983
Coral Buttsworth	Australia	1900	1985	2	1931/1932 Australian Championships champion ◌ Doubles: 1932 Australian Championships champion
Angela Buxton	United Kingdom	1934	2020		Ranked world No. 6 at the end of the year in 1956 ◌ Doubles: 1956 French Championships champion • 1956 Wimbledon champion
Mihaela Buzărnescu	Romania	1988			Ranked world No. 20 in singles in 2018 and world No. 28 in doubles in 2018
Mabel Cahill	United Kingdom	1863	1905	2	1891/1892 U.S. Championships champion
Els Callens	Belgium	1970			2000 Olympic bronze medalist in women's doubles
Jennifer Capriati	United States	1976		3	Ranked world No. 1 in singles for a total of 17 weeks in 2001 & 2002 ◌ Singles: 2001/2002 Australian Open champion • 2001 French Open champion • 1992 Olympic gold medalist
Mary Carillo	United States	1957			Ranked world No. 33 in singles in 1980 ◌ Mixed doubles: 1977 French Open champion
Pam Casale	United States	1963			Ranked world No. 14 in 1984
Rosemary Casals	United States	1948			Ranked world No. 3 at the end of 1970 ◌ Doubles: 1967/1968/1969/1970/1971/1973 Wimbledon champion • 1967/1971/1974/1982 US Open champion ◌ Mixed doubles: 1970/1972 Wimbledon champion • 1975 US Open champion
Michelle (Torres) Casati	United States	1967			Ranked world No. 18 in 1984
Helen Gourlay Cawley	Australia	1946			Doubles: 1972/1976/1977 (January)/1977 (December) Australian Open champion • 1977 Wimbledon champion
Arlette de Cazalet	France				Singles: 1951 French quarterfinalist
Sandra Cecchini	Italy	1965			Ranked world No. 15 in 1988
Anna Chakvetadze	Russia	1987			Ranked world No. 5 in singles and world No. 53 in doubles in 2007 ◌ Singles: 2007 US Open semifinalist
Latisha Chan	Chinese Taipei	1989			Ranked world No. 1 in doubles in 2017
Dorothy Bundy Cheney	United States	1916	2014	1	Ranked world No. 6 at the end of the year in 1946 • 1938 Australian champion
Natasha Chmyreva	Soviet Union	1958	2015		1975 Australian Open semifinalist
Dominika Cibulková	Slovakia	1989			Ranked world No. 4 in singles in 2017 • Australian Open Runner-up 2014
Sorana Cîrstea	Romania	1990			Ranked world No. 21 in singles in 2013 and world No. 35 in doubles in 2009
Kim Clijsters	Belgium	1983		4	Ranked world No. 1 in singles and doubles in 2003 ◌ Singles: 2005/2009/2010 US Open champion • 2011 Australian Open champion • 2002/2003/2010 WTA Finals champion ◌ Doubles: 2003 French Open champion • 2003 Wimbledon champion
Amanda Coetzer	South Africa	1971			Ranked world No. 3 in singles in 1997 and world No. 15 in doubles in 1993
Lorraine Coghlan Robinson	Australia	1937			Mixed doubles: 1958 Wimbledon mixed doubles champion
J. S. Colegate	United Kingdom				1924 Wimbledon quarterfinalist
Patricia Coleman	Australia	1953			1972 Australian Open quarterfinalist
Beryl Penrose Collier	Australia	1930	2021	1	Ranked world No. 8 at the end of the year in 1955 • 1955 Australian Championships champion
Evelyn Colyer	United Kingdom	1902	1930		1924 Olympic bronze medalist in women's doubles
Maureen Connolly Brinker	United States	1934	1969	9	Ranked world No. 1 at the end of the year from 1952 through 1954 • 1953 Australian Championships champion • 1953/1954 French Championships champion • 1952/1953/1954 Wimbledon champion • 1951/1952/1953 U.S. Championships champion ◌ Doubles: 1953 Australian Championships champion • 1954 French Championships champion ◌ Mixed doubles: 1954 French Championships champion
Hélène Contostavlos	Greece	1903	1963		1926 Wimbledon quarterfinalist
Sarah Palfrey Cooke	United States	1912	1996	2	Ranked world No. 4 at the end of the year in 1934 • 1941/1945 U.S. Championships champion ◌ Doubles: 1930/1932/1934/1935/1937/1938/1939/1940/1941 U.S. Championships champion • 1938/1939 Wimbledon champion ◌ Mixed doubles: 1932/1935/1937/1941 U.S. Championships champion • 1939 French Championships champion
Charlotte Cooper Sterry	United Kingdom	1870	1966	5	1895/1896/1898/1901/1908 Wimbledon champion • 1900 Olympic gold medalist in singles and mixed doubles
Belinda Cordwell	New Zealand	1965			Ranked world No. 17 in 1989
Alizé Cornet	France	1990			Ranked world No. 11 in singles in 2009
Margaret (Smith) Court	Australia	1942		24	• Ranked world No. 1 at the end of the year from 1962 through 1965 and in 1969, 1970, and 1973 • One of three players to have won every possible title (singles, doubles, mixed doubles) at all four Grand Slam events. • Australian Open champion 1960/1961/1962/1963/1964/1965/1966/1969/1970/1971/1973 • French Open champion 1962/1964/1969/1970/1973 • Wimbledon champion 1963/1965/1970 • US Open champion 1962/1965/1969/1970/1973 ◌ Doubles: Australian Open champion 1961/1962/1963/1965/1969/1970/1971/1973 • French Open champion 1964/1965/1966/1973 • Wimbledon champion 1964/1969 • US Open champion 1963/1968/1970/1973/1975 ◌ Mixed doubles: Australian Championships champion 1963/1964/1965/1969 • French Open champion 1963/1964/1965/1969 • Wimbledon champion 1963/1965/1966/1968/1975 • US Open champion 1961/1962/1963/1964/1965/1969/1970/1972
Paule Courteix	France				1959 French Championships quarterfinalist
Phyllis Covell	United Kingdom	1895	1982		1923 U.S. Championships women's doubles champion • 1924 Olympic silver medalist in women's doubles
Thelma Coyne Long	Australia	1918	2015	2	Ranked world No. 7 at year-end in 1952 • 1952/1954 Australian Championships champion • 1936/1937/1938/1939/1940/1947/1948/1949/1951/1952/1956/1958 Australian Championships women's doubles champion
Daphne Akhurst Cozens	Australia	1903	1933	5	Ranked world No. 3 at the end of the year in 1928 • 1925/1926/1928/1929/1930 Australian Championships champion • 1924/1925/1928/1929/1931 Australian Championships women's doubles champion • 1924/1925/1928/1929 Australian Championships mixed doubles champion
Marjorie Cox Crawford	Australia	1903	1983		Doubles: 1932 Australian champion ◌ Mixed doubles: 1931/1932/1933 Australian champion
Annabel Croft	United Kingdom	1966			Ranked world No. 24 in singles in 1985
Isabel Cueto	West Germany	1968			Ranked world No. 20 in singles in 1989 and world No. 77 in doubles in 1987
Joan Curry	United Kingdom	1918	2020		Ranked world No. 9 at the end of 1949 • 1949/1952 French Championships quarterfinalist
Eleni Daniilidou	Greece	1982			Ranked world No. 14 in singles in 2003 and world No. 21 in doubles in 2007
Rosa-Maria Reyes Darmon	Mexico	1939	2024		1959 French Championships semifinalist
Kimiko Date-Krumm	Japan	1970			Ranked world No. 4 in singles in 1995 and world No. 33 in doubles in 1992
Lindsay Davenport	United States	1976		3	Ranked world No. 1 in singles at the end of the year in 1998/2001/2004 & 2005 and world No. 2 in doubles at the end of the year in 1997 • Ranked world No. 1 in singles for a total of 98 weeks from 1998 through 2002 and from 2004 through 2006 ◌ Singles: 1998 US Open champion • 1999 Wimbledon champion • 2000 Australian Open champion • 1996 Olympic gold medalist • 1999 WTA Finals champion • 1998 French Open semifinalist ◌ Doubles: 1996 French Open champion • 1997 US Open champion • 1999 Wimbledon champion • 1996/1997/1998 WTA Finals champion
Barbara Scofield	United States	1926	2023		Ranked world No. 5 at the end of the year in 1950 • 1950 French Championships semifinalist
Nathalie Dechy	France	1979			Ranked world No. 11 in singles in 2006 and world No. 8 in doubles in 2007
Casey Dellacqua	Australia	1985			Ranked world No. 26 in singles in 2014 and world No. 5 in doubles in 2015 • 2011 French Open mixed doubles champion •
Elena Dementieva	Russia	1981			Ranked world No. 3 in singles in 2009 and world No. 5 in doubles in 2003 ◌ Singles: 2008 Olympic gold medalist • 2004 French Open finalist • 2004 US Open finalist • 2009 Australian Open semifinalist • 2008/2009 Wimbledon semifinalist ◌ Doubles: 2002 WTA Finals champion
Lottie Dod	United Kingdom	1871	1960	5	1887/1888/1891/1892/1893 Wimbledon champion
Jelena Dokić	Australia (Socialist Federal Republic of Yugoslavia) Yugoslavia (Serbia and Montenegro) Serbia and Montenegro	1983			Ranked world No. 4 in singles and world No. 10 in doubles in 2002 ◌ Singles: 2000 Wimbledon semifinalist • 2009 Australian Open quarterfinalist • 2002 French Open quarterfinalist
Ruxandra Dragomir Ilie	Romania	1972			Ranked world No. 15 in singles and world No. 21 in doubles in 1997
Gisela Dulko	Argentina	1985			Ranked world No. 26 in singles in 2005 and world No. 1 in doubles in 2010 ◌ Doubles: 2011 Australian Open champion • 2010 WTA Finals champion
Annette Van Zyl Du Plooy	South Africa	1943			Ranked world No. 6 at the end of the year in 1965 and 1966 • 1966 French Championships mixed doubles champion
Margaret Osborne duPont	United States	1918	2012	6	Ranked world No. 1 at the end of the year from 1947 through 1950 • 1946/1949 French Championships champion • 1948/1949/1950 U.S. Championships champion • 1947 Wimbledon champion • 1946/1947/1949 French Championships women's doubles champion • 1946/1948/1949/1950/1954 Wimbledon women's doubles champion • 1941/1942/1943/1944/1945/1946/1947/1948/1949/1950/1955/1956/1957 U.S. Championships women's doubles champion • 1962 Wimbledon mixed doubles champion • 1943/1944/1945/1946/1950/1956/1958/1959/1960 U.S. Championships mixed doubles champion
Jo Durie	United Kingdom	1960			Ranked world No. 5 in 1984 ◌ Singles: 1983 French Open semifinalist • 1983 US Open semifinalist • 1983 Australian Open quarterfinalist • 1984 Wimbledon quarterfinalist ◌ Mixed doubles: 1991 Australian champion • 1987 Wimbledon champion
Françoise Dürr	France	1942		1	Ranked world No. 3 at the end of 1967 ◌ Singles: 1967 French champion ◌ Doubles: 1967 French champion • 1968/1969/1970/1971 French Open champion • 1969/1972 US Open champion ◌ Mixed doubles: 1968/1971/1973 French Open champion • 1976 Wimbledon champion
Robyn Ebbern	Australia	1944			Ranked world No. 9 at the end of the year in 1964 • 1963 French Championships quarterfinalist • 1962/1963 Australian Championships women's doubles champion • 1963 U.S. Championships women's doubles champion • 1963 Australian Championships mixed doubles champion (shared – final abandoned because of rain)
Katja Ebbinghaus	West Germany	1948			1972/1973/1974 French Open quarterfinalist
Mary-Ann Eisel	United States	1946			1967 Wimbledon quarterfinalist
Silvia Farina Elia	Italy	1972			Ranked world No. 11 in singles in 2002 and world No. 24 in doubles in 1999
Sara Errani	Italy	1987			Ranked world No. 6 in singles in 2012 and No. 1 in doubles in 2012 • 2012 French Open women's doubles champion • 2012 US Open women's doubles champion • 2013 Australian Open women's doubles champion • ITF World Champion in doubles, 2012 (with Roberta Vinci)
Chris Evert	United States	1954		18	Ranked world No. 1 at the end of the year in 1975, 1976, 1977, 1980, and 1981 • Ranked world No. 1 for a total of 262 weeks from 1975 through 1982 and in 1985 • 1974/1975/1979/1980/1983/1985/1986 French Open champion • 1974/1976/1981 Wimbledon champion • 1975/1976/1977/1978/1980/1982 US Open champion • 1982/1984 Australian Open champion • 1974/1975 French Open women's doubles champion • 1976 Wimbledon women's doubles champion
Rosalyn (Fairbank) Nideffer	South Africa; United States	1960			Ranked world No. 15 in singles in 1990 and world No. 12 in doubles in 1986 • 1981/1983 French Open women's doubles champion
Donna Floyd Fales	United States	1940			1963 Wimbledon quarterfinalist • 1962 French Championships quarterfinalist
Patty Fendick	United States	1965			Ranked world No. 19 in singles and world No. 4 in doubles in 1989 • 1991 Australian Open women's doubles champion
Gigi Fernández	Puerto Rico; United States	1964			Ranked world No. 17 in singles and world No. 1 in doubles in 1991 • 1988/1990/1992/1995/1996 US Open women's doubles champion • 1991/1992/1993/1994/1995/1997 French Open women's doubles champion • 1992/1993/1994/1997 Wimbledon women's doubles champion • 1993/1994 Australian Open women's doubles champion • 1992/1996 Olympic gold medalist in women's doubles
Mary Joe Fernández	United States	1971			Ranked world No. 4 in singles in 1990 and world No. 4 in doubles in 1991 ◌ Singles: 1990/1992 Australian Open finalist • 1993 French Open finalist • 1991 Wimbledon semifinalist • 1990/1992 US Open semifinalist • 1992 Olympic bronze medalist ◌ Doubles: 1991 Australian Open champion • 1996 French Open champion • 1992/1996 Olympic gold medalist • 1996 WTA Finals champion
Joyce Fitch Rymer	Australia	1922	2012		1946 Australian Championships women's doubles champion
Beverly Baker Fleitz	United States	1930	2014		Ranked world No. 3 at the end of the year in 1954, 1955, and 1958 • 1955 French Championships women's doubles champion
Helen Fletcher Barker	United Kingdom	1931	2022		Ranked world No. 8 at the end of the year in 1954 • 1954 Wimbledon quarterfinalist
Kirsten Flipkens	Belgium	1986			Ranked world No. 13 in 2013 • 2013 Wimbledon semifinalist
Amy Frazier	United States	1972			Ranked world No. 13 in singles in 1995 and world No. 24 in doubles in 1993
Shirley Fry Irvin	United States	1927	2021	4	Ranked world No. 1 at the end of the year in 1956 • 1957 Australian Championships champion • 1951 French Championships champion • 1956 Wimbledon champion • 1956 U.S. Championships champion • 1957 Australian Championships women's doubles champion • 1950/1951/1952/1953 French Championships women's doubles champion • 1951/1952/1953 Wimbledon women's doubles champion • 1951/1952/1953/1954 U.S. Championships women's doubles champion • 1956 Wimbledon mixed doubles champion
Bettina Fulco-Villella	Argentina	1968			Ranked world No. 23 in singles in 1988 and world No. 62 in doubles in 1991
Bonnie Gadusek	United States	1963			Ranked world No. 8 in 1984
Donna Ganz	United States	1954			1975 French Open quarterfinalist
Tathiana Garbin	Italy	1977			Ranked world No. 22 in singles in 2007 and world No. 25 in doubles in 2001
Caroline Garcia	France	1993			Ranked world No. 4 in singles in 2018 and world No. 2 in doubles in 2016 • 2016 French Open women's doubles champion
Zina Garrison (Jackson)	United States	1963			Ranked world No. 4 in singles in 1989 and world No. 5 in doubles in 1988 • 1987 Australian Open mixed doubles champion • 1988/1990 Wimbledon mixed doubles champion
Coco Gauff	United States	2004		2	Ranked world No. 2 in singles in 2024 and world No. 1 in doubles in 2022 • 2023 US Open champion • 2025 French Open champion
Ruta Gerulaitis	United States	1955			1979 French Open quarterfinalist
Althea Gibson	United States	1927	2003	5	Ranked world No. 1 at the end of the year in 1957 and 1958 • 1956 French Championships champion • 1957/1958 Wimbledon Championships champion • 1957/1958 U.S. Championships champion
Camila Giorgi	Italy	1991			2018 Wimbledon quarterfinalist
Raquel Giscafré	Argentina	1949			1974 French Open semifinalist
Kathleen McKane Godfree	United Kingdom	1896	1992	2	Ranked world No. 2 at the end of the year in 1923, 1924, and 1926 • 1924/1926 Wimbledon Championships champion • 1924 Olympic silver medalist in women's doubles and bronze medalist in singles • 1920 Olympic gold medalist in women's doubles, silver medalist in mixed doubles, and bronze medalist in singles
Elsie Goldsack Pittman	United Kingdom	1904	1975		Ranked world No. 10 at the end of the year in 1929 and 1931 • 1929 Wimbledon semifinalist
Tatiana Golovin	France	1988			Ranked world No. 12 in singles in 2008 and world No. 91 in doubles in 2007
Viktorija Golubic	Switzerland	1992			2020 Olympic silver medalist in women's doubles
Kate Gompert	United States	1963			Ranked world No. 18 in 1987
Evonne Goolagong Cawley	Australia	1951		7	Ranked world No. 1 in 1976 • 1974/1975/1976/1977(December) Australian Open Champion • 1971 French Open champion • 1971/1980 Wimbledon champion • 1971/1974/1975/1976/1977(December) Australian Open women's doubles champion • 1974 Wimbledon women's doubles champion • 1972 French Open mixed doubles champion
Julia Görges	Germany	1988			Ranked world No. 9 in singles in 2018 and world No. 12 in doubles in 2016 • 2018 Wimbledon semifinalist
Inés Gorrochategui	Argentina	1973			Ranked world No. 19 in singles in 1994 and world No. 9 in doubles in 1995
Eleanor Goss	United States	1895	1982		Ranked world No. 6 at the end of the year in 1923, 1924, and 1925 • 1918 U.S. Championships runner-up • 1918/1919/1920/1926 U.S. Championships women's doubles champion
Carole Caldwell Graebner	United States	1943	2008		Ranked world No. 4 at the end of the year in 1964 • 1965 U.S. Championships women's doubles champion • 1966 Australian Championships women's doubles champion
Steffi Graf	Germany	1969		22	Ranked world No. 1 at the end of the year in 1987, 1988, 1989, 1990, 1993, 1994, 1995, and 1996 • 1988/1989/1990/1994 Australian Open champion • 1987/1988/1993/1995/1996/1999 French Open champion • 1988/1989/1991/1992/1993/1995/1996 Wimbledon champion • 1988/1989/1993/1995/1996 US Open champion • 1988 Wimbledon women's doubles champion • 1992 Olympic silver medalist in singles • 1988 Olympic gold medalist in singles and bronze medalist in doubles. Ranked world No. 1 for 377 weeks.
Rita Grande	Italy	1975			Ranked world No. 24 in singles and world No. 26 in doubles in 2001
Trudy Groenman	Netherlands	1944			1966 Wimbledon quarterfinalist
Anna-Lena Grönefeld	Germany	1985			Ranked world No. 14 in singles and world No. 7 in doubles in 2006 • 2009 Wimbledon mixed doubles champion • 2014 French Open mixed doubles champion
Jarmila (Gajdošová) Wolfe	Australia; Slovakia	1987			Singles: ranked world No. 25 in 2011 ◌ Doubles: ranked world No. 51 in 2007 ◌ Mixed doubles: 2013 Australian Open champion
Carly Gullickson	United States	1986			Singles: ranked world No. 123 in 2009 ◌ Doubles: ranked world No. 52 in doubles in 2006 ◌ Mixed doubles: 2009 US Open champion
Michèle Gurdal	Belgium	1952			Singles: 1979 Australian Open quarterfinalist
Melissa Gurney	United States	1969			Singles: ranked world No. 17 in 1987
Karina Habšudová	Slovakia	1973			Singles: ranked world No. 10 in 1997
Sabine Hack	Germany	1969			Ranked world No. 13 in singles in 1995 and world No. 94 in doubles in 1994
Beatriz Haddad Maia	Brazil	1996			Ranked World No. 10 in singles and in doubles in 2023 ◌ Singles: 2023 French Open semifinalist • 2024 US Open quarterfinalist ◌ Doubles: 2022 Australian Open runner up in women's doubles • 2022 French Open quarterfinalist in mixed doubles • 2023 US Open quarterfinalist in women's doubles
Julie Halard-Decugis	France	1970			Ranked world No. 7 in singles and world No. 1 in doubles in 2000 ◌ Singles: 1993/2000 Australian Open quarterfinalist • 1994 French Open quarterfinalist ◌ Doubles: 2000 US Open champion
Simona Halep	Romania	1991		2	Singles: ranked world No. 1 in 2017 • 2018 French Open champion • 2019 Wimbledon champion
Jamie Hampton	United States	1990			Singles: ranked world No. 24 in 2013
Sylvia Hanika	West Germany	1959			Ranked world No. 5 in 1983
Ellen Hansell	United States	1869	1937	1	1887 U.S. Championships champion
Daniela Hantuchová	Slovakia	1983			Ranked world No. 5 in singles in 2003 and in doubles in 2002 ◌ Mixed doubles: 2001 Wimbledon champion • 2002 Australian Open champion • 2005 French Open champion • 2005 US Open champion
Darlene Hard	United States	1936	2021	3	Ranked world No. 2 at year-end in 1957, 1960, and 1961 • 1960 French Championships champion • 1960/1961 U.S. Championships champion • 1957/1959/1960/1963 Wimbledon women's doubles champion • 1955/1957/1960 French Championships women's doubles champion • 1958/1959/1960/1961/1962 U.S. Championships women's doubles champion • 1957/1959/1960 Wimbledon mixed doubles champion • 1955/1961 French Championships mixed doubles champion
Mary Hardwick	United Kingdom	1913	2001		Ranked world No. 8 at year-end in 1939 • 1939 Wimbledon quarterfinalist
Tanya Harford	South Africa	1958			1981 French Open women's doubles champion
Anna McCune Harper	United States	1902	1999		1931 Wimbledon mixed doubles champion • Top-ranked player in the United States in 1930
Kerry Harris	Australia	1949			1972 Australian Open women's doubles champion
Betty Harrison	United Kingdom	1920	2017		1950 Wimbledon quarterfinalist
Doris Hart	United States	1925	2015	6	Ranked world No. 1 at year-end in 1951 • 1949 Australian Championships champion • 1950/1952 French Championships champion • 1951 Wimbledon champion • 1954/1955 U.S. Championships champion • 1950 Australian Championships women's doubles champion • 1948/1950/1951/1952/1953 French Championships women's doubles champion • 1947/1951/1952/1953 Wimbledon women's doubles champion • 1951/1952/1953/1954 U.S. Championships women's doubles champion • 1949/1950 Australian Championships mixed doubles champion • 1951/1952/1953 French Championships mixed doubles champion • 1951/1952/1953/1954/1955 Wimbledon mixed doubles champion • 1951/1952/1953/1954/1955 U.S. Championships mixed doubles champion
Kathleen Harter	United States	1946			1967 Wimbledon semifinalist
Linda Harvey-Wild	United States	1971			Ranked world No. 23 in singles and world No. 17 in doubles in 1996
Barbara Hawcroft	Australia	1950			1972 Australian Open quarterfinalist
Mary Hawton	Australia	1924	1981		Doubles: 1946/1954/1955/1956/1958 Australian Championships champion
Marie Hazel	United Kingdom				1923 Wimbledon quarterfinalist
Mary Heeley	United Kingdom	1911	2002		Ranked world No. 6 at year-end in 1932 • 1932 Wimbledon semifinalist
Bobbie Heine Miller	South Africa	1909	2016		Ranked world No. 5 at year-end in 1929 • 1929 Wimbledon quarterfinalist • 1927 French Championships women's doubles champion
Julie Heldman	United States	1945			Ranked world No. 5 at year-end in 1969
Helen Hellwig	United States	1874	1960	1	1894 U.S. Championships champion in singles and doubles
Justine Henin	Belgium	1982		7	Ranked world No. 1 in singles at the end of the year in 2003/2006/2007 and world No. 23 in doubles in 2002 ◌ Singles: 2003/2005/2006/2007 French Open champion • 2003/2007 US Open champion • 2004 Australian Open champion • 2004 Olympic gold medalist • 2006/2007 WTA Finals champion • 2001/2006 Wimbledon finalist ◌ Ranked world No. 1 for 125 weeks
Betty Hilton	United Kingdom	1920	2017		Ranked world No. 6 at year-end in 1949 ◌ Singles: 1949 Wimbledon quarterfinalist • 1946 French quarterfinalist
Martina Hingis	Switzerland	1980		5	Ranked world No. 1 in singles at the end of the year in 1997/1999/2000 and world No. 1 in doubles in 1998 ◌ Singles: 1997/1998/1999 Australian Open champion • 1997 Wimbledon champion • 1997 US Open champion • 1998/2000 WTA Finals champion • 1997/1999 French Open finalist ◌ Doubles: 1996/1998/2015 Wimbledon champion • 1997/1998/1999/2002/2016 Australian Open champion • 1998/2000 French Open champion • 1998/2015/2017 US Open champion ◌ Mixed doubles: 2006/2015 Australian Open champion • 2016 French Open champion • 2015/2017 Wimbledon champion • 2015/2017 US Open champion ◌ Ranked world No. 1 for 209 weeks
Rika Hiraki	Japan	1971			Ranked world No. 72 in singles and world No. 26 in doubles in 1997 • 1997 French Open mixed doubles champion
Andrea Hlaváčková	Czech Republic	1986			Ranked world No. 58 in singles and world No. 3 in doubles in 2012 ◌ Doubles: 2011 French Open champion • 2013 US Open champion • 2017 WTA Finals champion ◌ Mixed doubles: 2013 US Open champion
Jenny Hoad	Australia	1934	2024		1954 Australian Championships runner-up
Patti Hogan	United States	1949			1972 Wimbledon quarterfinalist
Dorothy Holman	United Kingdom	1883	1979		1912/1913 Wimbledon semifinalist • 1920 Olympic silver medalist in singles and women's doubles
Miloslava Holubová	Czechoslovakia	1949			1976 French Open quarterfinalist
Helen Homans	United States	1877	1949	1	1906 U.S. Championships champion
Emily Hood Westacott	Australia	1910	1980	1	1939 Australian Championships champion in singles • 1930/1933/1934 Australian Championships champion in doubles
Nell Hall Hopman	Australia	1909	1968		1939/1947 Australian Championships runner-up • 1930/1936/1937/1939 Australian Championships mixed doubles champion • 1954 French Championships women's doubles champion
Marie-Louise Horn	Germany	1912	1991		Ranked world No. 8 at year-end in 1932 and 1937 • 1936 Wimbledon quarterfinalist
Kathleen Horvath	United States	1965			Ranked world No. 10 in singles in 1984 and world No. 45 in doubles in 1988 ◌ Singles: 1983/1984 French Open quarterfinalist
Justina Bricka Horwitz	United States	1943			Singles: 1965 Wimbledon quarterfinalist
Lucie Hradecká	Czech Republic	1985			Ranked world No. 41 in singles and world No. 4 in doubles in 2012 ◌ Doubles: 2011 French Open champion • 2013 US Open champion
Hsieh Su-wei	Chinese Taipei	1986			Ranked world No. 23 in singles in 2013 and world No. 1 in doubles in 2014 ◌ Doubles: 2013 Wimbledon Champion • 2014 French Open champion • 2013 WTA Finals champion
Anke Huber	Germany	1974			Ranked world No. 4 in singles in 1996 and world No. 30 in doubles in 2000 ◌ Singles: 1996 Australian Open finalist • 1993 French Open semifinalist • 1999/2000 US Open quarterfinalist
Liezel (Horn) Huber	South Africa; United States	1976			Ranked world No. 131 in singles in 1999 and world No. 1 in doubles in 2007 • 2005/2007 Wimbledon women's doubles champion • 2007 Australian Open women's doubles champion • 2008 US Open women's doubles champion • 2009 French Open mixed doubles champion • 2010 US Open mixed doubles champion
Lesley Hunt	Australia	1950			Ranked world No. 9 at year-end in 1974
Storm Hunter	Australia	1994			Ranked world No. 1 in doubles in 2023 • 2022 US Open mixed doubles champion
Janette Husárová	Slovakia	1974			Ranked world No. 3 in doubles in 2003 • 2002 WTA Finals champion in doubles
Ana Ivanovic	Serbia	1987		1	Ranked world No. 1 in singles in 2008 and world No. 50 in doubles in 2006 ◌ Singles: 2008 French Open champion • 2008 Australian Open finalist • 2007 Wimbledon semifinalist • 2012 US Open quarterfinalist
Ons Jabeur	Tunisia	1994			Ranked world No. 2 in 2022 in Singles • 2022 Wimbledon Finalist • 2022 US Open Finalist
Helen Jacobs	United States	1908	1997	5	Ranked world No. 1 at the end of the year in 1936 • 1932/1933/1934/1935 U.S. Championships champion • 1936 Wimbledon champion • 1932/1934/1935 U.S. Championships women's doubles champion • 1934 U.S. Championships mixed doubles champion
Andrea Jaeger	United States	1965			Ranked world No. 3 at the end of the year in 1982 and 1983 • 1981 French Open mixed doubles champion
Freda James	United Kingdom	1911	1988		Doubles: 1935/1936 Wimbledon champion • 1933 U.S. Championships champion
Jelena Janković	Serbia	1985			Ranked world No. 1 in singles at the end of the year in 2008 and world No. 43 in doubles in 2006 ◌ Singles: 2008 US Open finalist • 2007/2008/2010 French Open semifinalist • 2008 Australian Open semifinalist ◌ Mixed doubles: 2007 Wimbledon champion
Mima Jaušovec	(Socialist Federal Republic of Yugoslavia) Yugoslavia	1956		1	Ranked world No. 8 at year-end in 1976 • 1977 French Open champion • 1978 French Open women's doubles champion
Jadwiga Jędrzejowska	Poland	1912	1980		Ranked world No. 3 at year-end in 1937 • 1939 French Championships women's doubles champion
Marion Jessup	United States	1897	1979		Ranked world No. 8 at year-end in 1922 • 1919/1920 U.S. Championships runner-up • 1918/1919/1920/1921 U.S. Championships women's doubles champion • 1919 U.S. Championships mixed doubles champion • 1924 Olympic silver medalist in mixed doubles
Ann Haydon Jones	United Kingdom	1938		3	Ranked world No. 2 at year-end in 1967 and 1969 • 1961/1966 French Championships champion • 1969 Wimbledon champion • 1963/1968/1969 French Championships women's doubles champion • 1969 Australian Championships mixed doubles champion • 1969 Wimbledon mixed doubles champion
Marion Jones Farquhar	United States	1879	1965	2	1899/1902 U.S. Championships champion • 1902 U.S. Championships women's doubles champion • 1901 U.S. Championships mixed doubles champion • 1900 Olympic bronze medalist in singles and mixed doubles
Barbara Jordan	United States	1957		1	Ranked world No. 78 in 1983 • 1979 Australian Open champion • 1983 French Open mixed doubles champion
Kathy Jordan	United States	1959			Ranked world No. 5 in singles and world No. 6 in doubles in 1984 • 1980 French Open women's doubles champion • 1980/1985 Wimbledon women's doubles champion • 1981 Australian Open women's doubles champion • 1981 US Open women's doubles champion • 1986 French Open mixed doubles champion • 1986 Wimbledon mixed doubles champion
Yone Kamio	Japan	1971			Ranked world No. 24 in singles in 1995 and world No. 65 in doubles in 1994
Carina Karlsson	Sweden	1963			1984 Wimbledon quarterfinalist
Daria Kasatkina	Russia	1997			Ranked world No. 8 in singles in 2022 and No. 43 in doubles in 2016
Helen Kelesi	Canada	1969			Ranked world No. 13 in singles in 1989 and world No. 26 in doubles in 1991
Sofia Kenin	United States	1998		1	Ranked world No. 4 at the end of the year in 2020 • 2020 Australian Open champion
Angelique Kerber	Germany	1988		3	Singles: ranked world No. 1 in 2016 • 2016 Australian Open champion • 2016 US Open champion • 2018 Wimbledon champion
Madison Keys	United States	1995		1	Ranked world No. 5 in singles in 2025 ◌ Singles: 2025 Australian Open Champion
Billie Jean King	United States	1943		12	Ranked world No. 1 at the end of the year in 1966, 1967, 1968, 1971, 1972, and 1974 • 1966/1967/1968/1972/1973/1975 Wimbledon champion • 1967/1971/1972/1974 US Open champion • 1968 Australian Championships champion • 1972 French Open champion • 1961/1962/1965/1967/1968/1970/1971/1972/1973/1979 Wimbledon women's doubles champion • 1972 French Open women's doubles champion • 1964/1967/1974/1978/1980 US Open women's doubles champion • 1968 Australian Championships mixed doubles champion • 1967/1970 French Open mixed doubles champion • 1967/1971/1973/1974 Wimbledon mixed doubles champion • 1967/1971/1973/1976 US Open mixed doubles champion
Vania King	United States	1989			Ranked world No. 50 in singles in 2006 and world No. 4 in doubles in 2010 • 2010 Wimbledon women's doubles champion • 2010 US Open women's doubles champion
Maria Kirilenko	Russia	1987			Ranked world No. 10 in singles in 2008 and world No. 9 in doubles in 2011
Alisa Kleybanova	Russia	1989			Ranked world No. 20 in singles in 2011 and world No. 10 in doubles in 2010
Ilana Kloss	South Africa	1956			Ranked world No. 19 in singles in 1979 and world No. 1 in doubles in 1976
Dorothy Head Knode	United States	1925	2015		Ranked world No. 5 at year-end in 1955 and 1957 • 1955/1957 French Championships runner-up
Claudia Kohde-Kilsch	West Germany	1963			Ranked world No. 4 in 1985 • 1985 US Open women's doubles champion • 1987 Wimbledon women's doubles champion • 1988 Olympic bronze medalist in women's doubles
Dorothea Köring	Germany	1880	1945		1912 Olympic silver medalist in singles and gold medalist in mixed doubles
Zsuzsa Körmöczy	Hungary	1924	2006	1	Ranked world No. 2 at year-end in 1958 • 1958 French Championships champion
Johanna Konta	Australia; United Kingdom	1991			Ranked career high world No.4 in singles in 2016 • 2016 Australian open Semifinalist
Anett Kontaveit	Estonia	1995			Ranked world No. 2 in singles in 2022 • 2020 Australian Open quarterfinalist • 2021 WTA Finals runner-up
Klára Koukalová	Czech Republic	1982			Ranked world No. 20 in singles in 2013 and world No. 31 in doubles in 2014
Anna Kournikova	Russia	1981			Ranked world No. 8 in singles in 2000 and world No. 1 in doubles in 1999 • 1999/2002 Australian Open women's doubles champion
Karen Krantzcke	Australia	1946	1977		Ranked world No. 9 at year-end in 1970 • 1970 French Open semifinalist • 1970/1977 Australian Open semifinalist • 1968 Australian Championships women's doubles champion
Lina Krasnoroutskaya	Russia	1984			Ranked world No. 25 in singles and world No. 22 in doubles in 2004
Barbora Krejčíková	(Czech Republic) Czechia	1995		2	Singles: ranked world No. 2 in 2022 • 2021 French Open champion • 2024 Wimbledon champion ◌ Doubles: ranked world No. 1 in 2018 • 2022/2023 Australian Open champion • 2018/2021 French Open champion • 2018/2022 Wimbledon champion • 2022 US Open champion
Anne Kremer	Luxembourg	1975			Ranked world No. 18 in singles in 2002
Joannette Kruger	South Africa	1973			Ranked world No. 21 in singles in 1998 and world No. 91 in doubles in 2002
Marise Kruger	South Africa	1958			1978 Wimbledon quarterfinalist
Kathy Kuykendall	United States	1956			1976 French Open quarterfinalist
Svetlana Kuznetsova	Russia	1985		2	Singles: ranked world No. 2 at the end of the year in 2007 • 2004 US Open champion • 2009 French Open champion ◌ Doubles: 2005/2012 Australian Open champion
Petra Kvitová	Czech Republic	1990		2	Ranked world No. 2 in singles in 2011 • 2011/2014 Wimbledon champion • 2019 Australian Open finalist • 2012/2020 French Open semifinalist • 2015/2017 US Open quarterfinalist
Simone Lafargue	France	1914	2010		1945 French Championships runner-up
Joan Fry	United Kingdom	1906	1985		Ranked world No. 7 at year-end in 1926 • 1925 Wimbledon runner-up
Dorothea Lambert Chambers	United Kingdom	1878	1960	7	1903/1904/1906/1910/1911/1913/1914 Wimbledon champion• 1908 Olympic gold medalist in singles
Sylvia Lance Harper	Australia	1895	1982	1	Ranked world No. 10 in 1924 • 1924 Australian Championships champion • 1923/1924/1925 Australian Championships women's doubles champion • 1923 Australian Championships mixed doubles champion
Nelly Adamson Landry	France	1916	2010	1	Ranked world No. 7 at year-end in 1946 • 1948 French Championships champion
Ethel Thomson Larcombe	United Kingdom	1879	1965	1	1912 Wimbledon champion • 1914 Wimbledon mixed doubles champion
Silvana Lazzarino	Italy	1933			1954 French Championships semifinalist
Andrea Leand	United States	1964			Ranked world No. 19 in 1983
Jan Lehane O'Neill	Australia	1941			Ranked world No. 7 at year-end in 1963 • 1960/1961/1962/1963 Australian Championships runner-up • 1960/1961 Australian Championships mixed doubles champion
Suzanne Lenglen	France	1899	1938	12	Ranked world No. 1 at year-end from 1921 through 1926 • 1919/1920/1921/1922/1923/1925 Wimbledon champion • 1920/1921/1922/1923/1925/1926 French Championships champion
Varvara Lepchenko	Uzbekistan; United States	1986			Ranked world No. 19 in singles 2012 and world No. 40 in doubles in 2013
Dorothy Levine	United States				1954 French Championships quarterfinalist
Li Na	China	1982		2	Ranked world No. 2 in singles in 2014 and world No. 54 in doubles in 2006 • 2011/2013 Australian Open runner-up • 2011 French Open champion • 2014 Australian Open champion
Li Ting	China	1980			Ranked world No. 136 in singles in 2005 and world No. 19 in doubles in 2004 • Gold medalist in women's doubles at the 2004 Olympics
Elena Likhovtseva	Russia	1975			Ranked world No. 15 in singles in 1999 and world No. 3 in doubles in 2004 • 2002 Wimbledon mixed doubles champion • 2007 Australian Open mixed doubles champion
Catarina Lindqvist	Sweden	1963			Ranked world No. 10 in 1985
Sabine Lisicki	Germany	1989			Ranked world No. 12 and world No. 35 in doubles in 2012 • 2009 Wimbledon quarterfinalist • 2011 Wimbledon semifinalist • 2012 Wimbledon quarterfinalist • 2013 Wimbledon finalist • 2014 Wimbledon quarterfinalist
Dorothy Round Little	United Kingdom	1908	1982	3	Ranked world No. 1 at year-end in 1934 • 1934/1937 Wimbledon champion • 1935 Australian Championships champion • 1934/1935/1936 Wimbledon mixed doubles champion
Anita Lizana	Chile	1915	1994	1	Ranked world No. 1 at year-end in 1937 • 1937 U.S. Championships champion
Nuria Llagostera Vives	Spain	1980			2009 WTA Finals champion in doubles
Peanut Louie Harper	United States	1960			Ranked world No. 19 in singles in 1985 and world No. 31 in doubles in 1992
Gail Sherriff; Chanfreau Lovera	France	1945			1968/1971 French Open quarterfinalist
Mirjana Lučić	Croatia	1982			Ranked world No. 20 in singles in 2017 and world No. 19 in doubles in 1998 • 1998 Australian Open women's doubles champion • 1999 Wimbledon semifinalist • 2017 Australian Open semifinalist
Ivanna Madrgua-Osses	Argentina	1961			1980 French Open quarterfinalist • 1980/1983 US Open quarterfinalist
Gretchen (Rush) Magers	United States	1964			Ranked world No. 22 in singles in 1985 and world No. 18 in doubles in 1990
Iva Majoli	Croatia	1977		1	Ranked world No. 4 in singles in 1996 and world No. 24 in doubles in 1995 • 1997 French Open champion
Ekaterina Makarova	Russia	1988			Ranked world No. 8 in singles and world No. 1 in doubles • 2013 French Open women's doubles champion • 2014 US Open women's doubles champion • 2012 US Open mixed doubles champion • 2016 Olympics women's doubles gold medalist
Katerina Maleeva	Bulgaria	1969			Ranked world No. 6 in singles in 1990 and world No. 24 in doubles in 1994
Magdalena Maleeva	Bulgaria	1975			Ranked world No. 4 in singles in 1996 and world No. 13 in doubles in 2004
Manuela Maleeva-Fragnière	Bulgaria	1967			Ranked world No. 3 in 1985 • 1984 US Open mixed doubles champion
Molla Bjurstedt Mallory	Norway; United States	1884	1959	8	Ranked world No. 2 at year-end in 1921 and 1922 • 1915/1916/1917/1918/1920/1921/1922/1926 U.S. Championships champion • 1916/1917 U.S. Championships women's doubles champion • 1917/1922/1923 U.S. Championships mixed doubles champion
Hana Mandlíková	Czechoslovakia; Australia	1962		4	Ranked world No. 3 in 1984 • 1980/1987 Australian Open champion • 1981 French Open champion • 1985 US Open champion • 1989 US Open women's doubles champion
Lucia Manfredi	Italy				1947 French Championships quarterfinalist
Eugenia Maniokova	Soviet Union; Russia	1968			Ranked world No. 68 in singles in 1992 and world No. 18 in doubles in 1994 • 1993 French Open mixed doubles champion
Alice Marble	United States	1913	1990	5	Ranked world No. 1 at the end of the year in 1939 • 1936/1938/1939/1940 U.S. Championships champion • 1939 Wimbledon champion • 1937/1938/1939/1940 U.S. Championships women's doubles champion • 1938/1939 Wimbledon women's doubles champion • 1936/1938/1939/1940 U.S. Championships mixed doubles champion • 1937/1938/1939 Wimbledon mixed doubles champion
Norma Marsh	Australia	1936			1958 Australian Championship semifinalist
Regina Maršíková	Czechoslovakia	1958			1977/1978 French Open semifinalist
Cecilia Martinez	United States	1947			1970 Wimbledon quarterfinalist
Conchita Martínez	Spain	1972		1	Ranked world No. 2 at the end of the year in 1995 • 1994 Wimbledon champion • 1992/2004 Olympic silver medalist in women's doubles • 1996 Olympic bronze medalist in women's doubles
María José Martínez Sánchez	Spain	1982			Ranked world No. 19 in singles and world No. 4 in doubles in 2010
Helga Niessen Masthoff	West Germany	1941			Ranked world No. 6 at year-end in 1970 • 1970 French Open runner-up • 1976 French Open women's doubles runner-up
Simonne Mathieu	France	1908	1980	2	Ranked world No. 3 at year-end in 1932 • 1938/1939 French Championships champion • 1933/1934/1937 Wimbledon women's doubles champion • 1933/1934/1936/1937/1938/1939 French Championships women's doubles champion • 1937/1938 French Championships mixed doubles champion
Christine Matison	Australia	1951			1978 Australian Open semifinalist
Bethanie Mattek-Sands	United States	1985			Ranked world No. 30 in singles in 2011 and world No. 1 in doubles in 2017 • 2012 Australian Open mixed doubles champion
Amélie Mauresmo	France	1979		2	Ranked world No. 1 in 2004 and 2006 • 2006 Australian Open champion • 2006 Wimbledon champion
Kathy May	United States	1956			1977/1978 French Open quarterfinalist • 1978 US Open quarterfinalist • Ranked 10th in singles in 1977
Myrtle McAteer	United States	1878	1952	1	1900 U.S. Championships champion
Meredith McGrath	United States	1971			Ranked world No. 18 in singles in 1996 and world No. 5 in doubles in 1994 • 1995 US Open mixed doubles champion
Christina McHale	United States	1992			Ranked world No. 24 in singles in 2012 and world No. 35 in doubles in 2017
Mary McIlquham	Netherlands	1901			1929 Wimbledon quarterfinalist
Winifred McNair	United Kingdom	1877	1954		1913 Wimbledon women's doubles champion • 1920 Olympic gold medalist in women's doubles
Lori McNeil	United States	1963			Ranked world No. 9 in singles in 1988 and world No. 4 in doubles in 1987 • 1987 Australian Open women's doubles champion • 1988 French Open mixed doubles champion
Rachel McQuillan	Australia	1971			1992 Olympic bronze medalist in women's doubles
Anabel Medina Garrigues	Spain	1982			Ranked world No. 16 in singles in 2009 and world No. 3 in doubles in 2008 • 2008/2009 French Open women's doubles champion
Natalia Medvedeva	Soviet Union; Ukraine	1971			Ranked world No. 23 in singles in 2003 and world No. 21 in doubles in 1994
Christiane Mercelis	Belgium	1931	2024		1957 French quarterfinalist
Elise Mertens	Belgium	1995			Ranked world No. 12 in singles in 2018 and world No. 1 in doubles in 2021 ◌ Singles: 2018 Australian Open semifinalist • 2019/2020 US Open quarterfinalist ◌ Doubles: 2019 US Open doubles champion • 2021 Australian Open doubles champion
Leila Meskhi	Soviet Union (Georgia (country)) Georgia	1968			Ranked world No. 12 in singles in 1991 and world No. 21 in doubles in 1995
Margaret "Peggy" Michel	United States	1949			1974/1975 Australian Open women's doubles champion • 1974 Wimbledon women's doubles champion
Peggy Michell	United Kingdom	1905	1941		Doubles: 1928/1929 Wimbledon champion 1929 U.S. Championships champion
Florența Mihai	Romania	1955			Singles: 1977 French Open runner-up
Anne Minter	Australia	1963			Ranked world No. 23 in singles in 1988 and world No. 68 in doubles in 1990
Sania Mirza	India	1986			Ranked world No. 27 in singles and world No. 1 in doubles. Three Grand Slam titles in mixed doubles. By far the most successful female player from India.
Kristina Mladenovic	France	1993			Ranked world No. 10 in singles in 2017 and world No. 1 in doubles in 2019 ◌ Singles: 2015 US Open quarterfinalist • 2017 French Open quarterfinalist ◌ Doubles: 2016/2019/2020/2022 French Open champion ◌ Mixed doubles: 2013 Wimbledon champion • 2014/2022 Australian Open champion
Corinne Molesworth	United Kingdom	1949			1972 French Open quarterfinalist
Margaret Molesworth	Australia	1894	1985	2	Ranked world No. 10 at year-end in 1922 and 1923 • 1922/1923 Australian Championships champion • 1930/1933/1934 Australian Championships women's doubles champion
Alicia Molik	Australia	1981			Ranked world No. 8 in singles and world No. 6 in doubles in 2005 ◌ Singles: 2005 Australian Open quarterfinalist • 2004 Olympic bronze medalist ◌ Doubles: 2005 Australian Open champion • 2007 French Open champion
Dominique Monami	Belgium	1973			Ranked world No. 9 in singles in 1998 and world No. 21 in doubles in 2000 ◌ Singles: 1997/1999 Australian Open quarterfinalist
Ángeles Montolio	Spain	1975			Ranked world No. 22 in singles in 2002
Helen Wills Moody	United States	1905	1998	19	Ranked world No. 1 at the end of the year in 1927, 1928, 1929, 1930, 1931, 1932, 1933, 1935, and 1938 • 1923/1924/1925/1927/1928/1929/1931 U.S. Championships champion • 1927/1928/1929/1930/1932/1933/1935/1938 Wimbledon champion • 1928/1929/1930/1932 French Championships champion • 1922/1924/1925/1928 U.S. Championships women's doubles champion • 1924/1927/1930 Wimbledon women's doubles champion • 1930/1932 French Championships women's doubles champion • 1924/1928 U.S. Championships mixed doubles champion • 1929 Wimbledon mixed doubles champion • 1924 Olympic gold medalist in singles and in doubles
Elisabeth Moore	United States	1876	1959	4	1896/1901/1903/1905 U.S. Championships champion
Sally Moore Huss	United States	1940			Ranked world No. 9 at year-end in 1959 • 1959 Wimbledon semifinalist
Corina Morariu	United States	1978			Ranked world No. 29 in singles in 1998 and world No. 1 in doubles in 2000 • 1999 Wimbledon women's doubles champion • 2001 Australian Open mixed doubles champion
Olga Morozova	Soviet Union	1949			Ranked world No. 7 at year-end in 1975 • 1974 French Open women's doubles champion
Angela Mortimer Barrett	United Kingdom	1932		3	Ranked world No. 1 at year-end in 1961 • 1955 French Championships champion • 1958 Australian Championships champion • 1961 Wimbledon champion • 1955 Wimbledon women's doubles champion
Joy Gannon Mottram	United Kingdom	1928			1952 French Championships quarterfinalist
Alycia Moulton	United States	1961			Ranked world No. 18 in singles in 1984 and world No. 28 in doubles in 1987
Karolína Muchová	Czech Republic	1996			
Phyllis Mudford King	United Kingdom	1905	2006		Ranked world No. 7 at year-end in 1930 • 1930 Wimbledon quarterfinalist • 1931 Wimbledon women's doubles champion
Garbiñe Muguruza	Spain	1993		2	Singles: ranked world No. 1 in singles in 2017, ranked world No. 10 in doubles in 2015 ◌ Singles: 2016 French open champion • 2017 Wimbledon champion • 2020 Australian Open finalist
Anastasia Myskina	Russia	1981		1	Ranked world No. 2 in singles in 2004 and world No. 15 in doubles in 2005 • 2004 French Open champion
Kyōko Nagatsuka	Japan	1974			Ranked world No. 28 in singles and world No. 31 in doubles in 1995
Betsy Nagelsen	United States	1956			Ranked world No. 25 in singles in 1986 and world No. 11 in doubles in 1988 • 1978/1980 Australian Open women's doubles champion
Henrieta Nagyová	Slovakia	1978			Ranked world No. 21 in singles in 2001 and world No. 37 in doubles in 2002
Martina Navratilova	Czechoslovakia; United States	1956		18	Ranked world No. 1 at year-end in 1978, 1979, 1982, 1983, 1984, 1985, and 1986 • 1978/1979/1982/1983/1984/1985/1986/1987/1990 Wimbledon champion • 1981/1983/1985 Australian Open champion • 1982/1984 French Open champion • 1983/1984/1986/1987 US Open champion • 1980/1982/1983/1984/1985/1987/1988/1989 Australian Open women's doubles champion • 1975/1982/1984/1985/1986/1987/1988 French Open women's doubles champion • 1976/1979/1981/1982/1983/1984/1986 Wimbledon women's doubles champion • 1977/1978/1980/1983/1984/1986/1987/1989/1990 US Open women's doubles champion • 2003 Australian Open mixed doubles champion • 1974/1985 French Open mixed doubles champion • 1985/1993/1995/2003 Wimbledon mixed doubles champion • 1985/1987/2006 US Open mixed doubles champion • Ranked world No. 1 for 331 weeks
Carrie Neely	United States	1876	1938		Doubles: 1903/1905/1907 U.S. Championships champion
Larisa (Savchenko) Neiland	Latvia	1966			Ranked world No. 13 in singles in 1988 and world No. 1 in doubles in 1992 • 1989 French Open women's doubles champion • 1991 Wimbledon women's doubles champion • 1992 Wimbledon mixed-doubles champion • 1994/1996 Australian Open mixed-doubles champion • 1995 French Open mixed-doubles champion
Janet Newberry	United States	1953			1975/1977 French Open semifinalist
Jana Novotná	Czechoslovakia; Czech Republic	1968	2017	1	Ranked world No. 2 in singles at the end of the year in 1997 and world No. 1 in doubles in 1990 • 1998 Wimbledon champion • 1989/1990/1995/1998 Wimbledon women's doubles champion • 1990/1995 Australian Open women's doubles champion • 1990/1991/1998 French Open women's doubles champion • 1994/1997/1998 US Open women's doubles champion • 1988/1989 Australian Open mixed doubles champion • 1988 US Open mixed doubles champion • 1989 Wimbledon mixed doubles champion
Yola Ramírez Ochoa	Mexico	1935			Ranked world No. 6 at year-end in 1961 • 1958 French Championships women's doubles champion • 1959 French Championships mixed doubles champion
Meryl O'Hara Wood	Australia		1958		Doubles: 1926/1927 Australian Championships champion
Chris O'Neil	Australia	1956		1	1978 Australian Open champion
Naomi Osaka	Japan	1997		4	Singles: ranked world No. 1 in 2019 • 2018/2020 US Open champion • 2019/2021 Australian Open champion
Jeļena Ostapenko	Latvia	1997		1	Singles: ranked world No. 5 in 2018 • 2017 French Open champion • 2018 Wimbledon semifinalist ◌ Doubles: ranked No. 32 in 2017
Miriam Oremans	Netherlands	1972			Ranked world No. 25 in singles in 1993 and world No. 19 in doubles in 1997 ◌ Doubles: 2000 Olympic silver medalist
Melanie Oudin	United States	1991			Ranked world No. 31 in singles in 2010 and world No. 125 in doubles in 2011 • 2011 US Open mixed doubles champion
Tatiana Panova	Russia	1976			Ranked world No. 20 in singles in 2002 and world No. 75 in doubles in 2003
Jasmine Paolini	Italy	1996			Ranked world No. 4 in singles in 2024 and world No. 7 in doubles in 2025 • 2024 Olympic Gold medalist • 2024 French Open finalist • 2024 Wimbledon Championships finalist
Pascale Paradis	France	1966			Ranked world No. 20 in singles and world No. 38 in doubles in 1988
Susan Chatrier Partridge	France	1930	1999		1953 French Championships quarterfinalist
Barbara Paulus	Austria	1970			Ranked world No. 10 in singles in 1996 and world No. 83 in doubles in 1989
Lolette Payot	Switzerland	1910	1988		Ranked world No. 4 at year-end in 1932 • 1932/1934/1935 French Championships quarterfinalist • 1931/1933/1934 Wimbledon Championships quarterfinalist • 1935 French Championships mixed doubles champion
Irene Bowder Peacock	South Africa	1892	1978		Ranked world No. 6 at year-end in 1922 • 1927 French Championships runner-up • 1927 French Championships women's doubles champion
Shahar Pe'er	Israel	1987			Ranked world No. 11 in singles in 2011 and world No. 14 in doubles in 2008
Jessica Pegula	United States	1994			Ranked world No. 3 in singles in 2022 and world No. 1 in doubles in 2023
Peng Shuai	China	1986			Ranked world No. 14 in singles in 2011 and world No. 1 in doubles in 2014
Flavia Pennetta	Italy	1982		1	Ranked world No. 6 in singles in 2009 and world No. 1 in doubles in 2011 ◌ Singles: 2015 US Open champion • 2014 Australian Open quarterfinalist ◌ Doubles: 2011 Australian Open champion • 2010 WTA Finals champions
Květa (Hrdličková) Peschke	Czech Republic	1975			Ranked world No. 26 in singles in 2005 and world No. 1 in doubles in 2011 • 2011 Wimbledon doubles champion
Andrea Petkovic	Germany	1987			Ranked world No. 9 in singles in 2011 and world No. 68 in doubles in 2009
Nadia Petrova	Russia	1982			Ranked world No. 3 in singles in 2006 and world No. 3 in doubles in 2005
Eva Pfaff	West Germany	1961			Ranked world No. 17 in singles in 1983 and world No. 16 in doubles in 1988
Terry Phelps	United States	1966			Ranked world No. 20 in singles in 1986 and world No. 37 in doubles in 1989
Mary Pierce	France	1975		2	Ranked world No. 3 in singles in 1995 and world No. 3 in doubles in 2000 • 1995 Australian Open champion • 2000 French Open champion • 2000 French Open women's doubles champion • 2005 Wimbledon mixed doubles champion
Laura Pigossi	Brazil	1994			2020 Olympic bronze medalist in women's doubles
Marie; Neumannová Pinterova	Czechoslovakia; Hungary	1946			1974 French Open quarterfinalist
Sylvia Plischke	Austria	1977			Ranked world No. 27 in singles in 1999 and world No. 78 in doubles in 2001 • 1999 French Open quarterfinals
Karolína Plíšková	Czech Republic	1992			Ranked world No. 1 in singles in 2017 • 2016 US Open finalist
Kimberly Po-Messerli	United States	1971			Ranked world No. 14 in singles in 1997 and world No. 6 in doubles in 2001 • 2000 Wimbledon mixed doubles champion
Claudia Porwik	Germany	1968			Ranked world No. 29 in singles in 1990 and world No. 24 in doubles in 1994 • 1990 Australian Open quarterfinals
Barbara Potter	United States	1961			Ranked world No. 10 in singles in 1983, and world No. 15 in doubles in 1988
Betty Rosenquest Pratt	United States	1925	2016		Ranked world No. 7 at year-end in 1954 • 1954 Wimbledon semifinalist
Mary Prentiss	United States	1916	1975		1948 French Championships quarterfinalist
Yvonne Prévost	France	1878	1942		1900 Olympic silver medalist
Sandra Reynolds Price	South Africa	1934			Ranked world No. 3 at year-end in 1960 • 1959 Australian Championships women's doubles champion • 1959/1961/1962 French Championships women's doubles champion • 1959 Australian Championships mixed doubles champion
Monica Puig	Puerto Rico	1993			Singles: 2016 Olympic gold medalist
Jean Quertier	United Kingdom	1925	2019		Ranked world No. 9 at year-end in 1952 • 1948/1952 Wimbledon quarterfinalist • 1953 French Championships quarterfinalist
Emma Raducanu	United Kingdom	2002		1	Singles: ranked world No. 10 in 2022 • 2021 US Open champion
Agnieszka Radwańska	Poland	1989			Ranked world No. 2 in singles in 2012 and world No. 25 in doubles in 2011
Lisa Raymond	United States	1973			Ranked world No. 15 in singles in 1997 and world No. 1 in doubles in 2000 • 2000 Australian Open women's doubles champion • 2001 Wimbledon women's doubles champion • 2001/2005 US Open women's doubles champion • 2006 French Open women's doubles champion • 1996/2002 US Open mixed doubles champion • 1999 Wimbledon mixed doubles champion • 2003 French Open mixed doubles champion
Virginie Razzano	France	1983			Ranked world No. 16 in singles in 2009 and world No. 82 in doubles in 2001
Hazel Redick-Smith	South Africa	1926	1996		1952 French Championships semifinalist
Raffaella Reggi	Italy	1965			Ranked world No. 13 in singles in 1988 and world No. 25 in doubles in 1991
Stephanie Rehe	United States	1969			Ranked world No. 10 in singles in 1989 and world No. 10 in doubles in 1992
Kerry Melville Reid	Australia	1947		1	Ranked world No. 5 at year-end in 1971 • 1977 (January) Australian Open champion • 1968/1977 Australian Championships/Open women's doubles champion • 1978 Wimbledon women's doubles champion
Elna Reinach	South Africa	1968			Ranked world No. 26 in singles in 1989 and world No. 10 in doubles in 1990 • 1994 US Open mixed doubles champion
Jennifer Mundel Reinbold	South Africa	1962			1983 Wimbledon quarterfinalist
Mary Carter Reitano	Australia	1934		2	1956/1959 Australian Championships champion • 1961 Australian Championships women's doubles champion • 1960/1961 Australian Championships mixed doubles champion
Aravane Rezaï	France	1987			Ranked world No. 16 in singles in 2010
Lena Rice	United Kingdom	1866	1907	1	1890 Wimbledon champion
Nancy Richey (Gunter)	United States	1942		2	Ranked world No. 3 at the end of the year in 1968 • 1967 Australian Championships champion • 1968 French Open champion • 1966 Australian Championships women's doubles champion • 1965/1966 U.S. Championships women's doubles champion
Louise Riddell Williams	United States	1884	1958		Doubles: 1913/1914/1921 U.S. Championships champion
Joan Ridley O'Meara	United Kingdom	1903	1983		1929 Wimbledon semifinalist
Helen Rihbany	United States	1916	1998		1949 Wimbledon semifinalist
Kathy Rinaldi	United States	1967			Ranked world No. 7 in singles in 1986 and world No. 13 in doubles in 1993
Barbara Rittner	Germany	1973			Ranked world No. 24 in singles in 1993 and world No. 23 in doubles in 2002
Muriel Robb	United Kingdom	1878	1907	1	1902 Wimbledon champion
Esna Boyd Robertson	Australia	1899	1966	1	Ranked world No. 10 at year-end in 1928 • 1927 Australian Championships champion • 1922/1923/1926/1928 Australian Championships women's doubles champion • 1922/1926/1927 Australian Championships mixed doubles champion
Madzy Rollin Couquerque	Netherlands	1903	1994		1938 French Championships semifinalist
Ellen Roosevelt	United States	1868	1954	1	1890 U.S. Championships champion in singles and doubles
E. F. Rose	United Kingdom				1923 Wimbledon quarterfinalist
Hedwiga Rosenbaumová	Bohemia	1864	1939		1900 Olympic bronze medalist
Edith Rotch	United States	1874	1969		Doubles: 1909/1910 U.S. Championships champion
Odile de Roubin	France	1948			1973 French Open quarterfinalist
Erin Routliffe	New Zealand	1995			Ranked world No. 1 in doubles in 2024 • 2023 US Open doubles champion
Virginia Ruano Pascual	Spain	1973			Ranked world No. 28 in singles in 1999 and world No. 1 in doubles in 2003 • 2001/2002/2004/2005/2008 French Open women's doubles champion • 2002/2003/2004 US Open women's doubles champion • 2004 Australian Open women's doubles champion • 2000 French Open mixed doubles champion
Chanda Rubin	United States	1976			Ranked world No. 6 in singles in 1996 and world No. 9 in doubles in 1996 • 1996 Australian Open semifinalist • 1995/2000/2003 French Open quarterfinalist • 1996 Australian Open women's doubles champion
Magda Rurac	Romania	1918	1995		Ranked world No. 9 at year-end in 1948 • 1947 French Championships quarterfinalist
Joanne Russell	United States	1954			Ranked world No. 22 in singles in 1983 and world No. 32 in doubles in 1987
Virginia Ruzici	Romania	1955		1	Ranked world No. 8 in 1979 • 1978 French Open champion • 1978 French Open women's doubles champion
Elizabeth Ryan	United States	1892	1979		Ranked world No. 3 at year-end in 1927 • 1914/1922/1930/1932/1933/1934 French Championships women's doubles champion • 1914/1919/1920/1921/1922/1923/1925/1926/1927/1930/1933/1934 Wimbledon women's doubles champion • 1926 U.S. Championships women's doubles champion • 1913/1914 French Championships mixed doubles champion • 1919/1921/1923/1927/1928/1930/1932 Wimbledon mixed doubles champion • 1926/1933 U.S. Championships mixed doubles champion
Elena Rybakina	Kazakhstan	1999		1	Ranked world No. 3 in singles in 2023 • 2022 Wimbledon Champion
Magdaléna Rybáriková	Slovakia	1988			Ranked world No. 17 in 2018 • 2017 Wimbledon semifinalist • 2014 Wimbledon doubles semifinalist
Aryna Sabalenka	Belarus	1998		4	Ranked world No. 1 in 2023 • 2023/2024 Australian Open champion • 2024/2025 US Open Champion
Gabriela Sabatini	Argentina	1970		1	Ranked world No. 3 in singles in 1989 and world No. 3 in doubles in 1988 • 1990 US Open champion • 1988 Wimbledon women's doubles champion. 1988 Olympic silver medalist in singles.
Lucie Šafářová	Czech Republic	1987			Ranked world No. 5 in singles in 2015 and world No. 1 in doubles in 2017
Dinara Safina	Russia	1986			Ranked world No. 1 in singles in 2009 and world No. 8 in doubles in 2008 • 2007 US Open women's doubles champion
Maria Sakkari	Greece	1995			Ranked world No. 3 in singles in 2022 • 2021 French Open Semifinalist • 2021 US Open Semifinalist
Arantxa Sánchez Vicario	Spain	1971		4	Ranked world No. 1 in singles in 1995 and world No. 1 in doubles in 1992 • 1989/1994/1998 French Open champion • 1994 US Open champion • 1992/1995/1996 Australian Open women's doubles champion • 1993/1994 US Open women's doubles champion • 1995 Wimbledon women's doubles champion • 1990/1992 French Open mixed doubles champion • 1993 Australian Open mixed doubles champion • 2000 US Open mixed doubles champion
Christina Sandberg	Sweden	1948			1970 Australian Open quarterfinals
Mara Santangelo	Italy	1981			Ranked world No. 27 in singles and world No. 5 in doubles in 2007 • 2007 French Open women's doubles champion
Phyllis Satterthwaite	United Kingdom	1886	1962		Ranked world No. 8 at year-end in 1924 • 1924 Wimbledon semifinalist
Kazuko Sawamatsu	Japan	1951			1975 French Open quarterfinalist • 1975 Wimbledon women's doubles champion
Naoko Sawamatsu	Japan	1973			Ranked world No. 14 in singles and world No. 98 in doubles in 1995
Mary Sawyer	Australia	1957			1979 Australian Open semifinalist
Marijke Schaar	Netherlands	1944			1971 French Open semifinalist
Barbara Schett	Austria	1976			Ranked world No. 7 in singles in 1999 and world No. 8 in doubles in 2001 ◌ Singles: 1999 US Open quarterfinalist • 1999 WTA Finals quarterfinalist
Francesca Schiavone	Italy	1980		1	Ranked world No. 4 in singles in 2011 and world No. 8 in doubles in 2007 ◌ Singles: 2010 French Open champion, 2003/2010 US Open quarterfinalist, 2009 Wimbledon quarterfinalist, 2011 Australian Open quarterfinalist
Patty Schnyder	Switzerland	1978			Ranked world No. 7 in singles and world No. 15 in doubles in 2005 ◌ Singles: 2004 Australian Open semifinalist • 1998/2008 French Open quarterfinalist • 1998/2008 US Open quarterfinalist
Brenda Schultz-McCarthy	Netherlands	1970			Ranked world No. 9 in singles in 1996 and world No. 7 in doubles in 1995
Helga Schultze	West Germany	1940	2015		Ranked world No. 5 at year-end in 1964 • 1964 French Championships semifinalist
Renée Schuurman	South Africa	1939	2001		Ranked world No. 8 at year-end in 1963 • 1959 Australian Championships women's doubles champion • 1959/1961/1962/1963 French Championships women's doubles champion • 1962 French Championships mixed doubles champion
Barbara Schwartz	Austria	1979			Ranked world No. 40 in singles in 1999 • 1999 French Open quarter-finals
Margaret Scriven Vivian	United Kingdom	1912	2001	2	Ranked world No. 5 at year-end in 1933 and 1934 • 1933/1934 French champion • 1935 French women's doubles champion • 1935 French mixed doubles champion
Eleonora Sears	United States	1881	1968		Doubles: 1911/1915/1916/1917 U.S. Championships champion
Evelyn Sears	United States	1875	1966	1	1907 U.S. Championships champion
Anne-Marie Seghers	France	1911	2012		1949/1954 French Championships quarter-finalist
Monica Seles	(Socialist Federal Republic of Yugoslavia) Yugoslavia; United States	1973		9	Ranked world No. 1 in singles at the end of 1991/1992/1995 and ranked world No. 16 in doubles in 1991 • 1991/1992/1993/1996 Australian Open champion • 1990/1991/1992 French Open champion • 1991/1992 US Open champion • 1990/1991/1992 WTA Finals champion • 1992 Wimbledon finalist • 2000 Olympic bronze medalist
Magüi Serna	Spain	1979			Ranked world No. 19 in singles and world No. 25 in doubles in 2004
Anastasija Sevastova	Latvia	1990			Ranked world No. 11 in singles in 2018 • 2018 US Open semifinalist
Maria Sharapova	Russia	1987		5	Ranked world No. 1 in 2005 ◌ Singles: 2004 Wimbledon champion • 2006 US Open champion • 2008 Australian Open champion • 2012/2014 French Open champion • 2004 WTA Finals champion • 2012 Olympic silver medalist
Meghann Shaughnessy	United States	1979			Ranked world No. 11 in singles in 2001 and world No. 4 in doubles in 2005
Winnie Shaw	United Kingdom	1947	1992		1970 Wimbledon quarterfinalist
Dorothy Shepherd-Barron	United Kingdom	1897	1953		1921/1924 Wimbledon quarterfinalist • 1924 Olympic bronze medalist in women's doubles • 1931 Wimbledon women's doubles champion
Betty Nuthall Shoemaker	United Kingdom	1911	1983	1	Ranked world No. 4 at the end of the year in 1929 • 1930 U.S. Championships champion • 1930/1931/1933 U.S. Championships women's doubles champion • 1931 French Championships women's doubles champion • 1929/1931 U.S. Championships mixed doubles champion • 1931/1932 French Championships mixed doubles champion
Pam Shriver	United States	1962			Ranked world No. 3 in 1984 • 1984/1985/1987/1988 French Open women's doubles champion • 1981/1982/1983/1984/1986 Wimbledon women's doubles champion • 1983/1984/1986/1987/1991 US Open women's doubles champion • 1982/1983/1984/1985/1987/1988/1989 Australian Open women's doubles champion • 1987 Wimbledon mixed-doubles champion
Yaroslava Shvedova	Russia; Kazakhstan	1987			Ranked world No. 25 in singles in 2012 and world No. 3 in doubles in 2016 • 2010 Wimbledon women's doubles champion • 2010 US Open women's doubles champion
Anne-Gaëlle Sidot	France	1979			Ranked world No. 24 in singles in 2000 and world No. 15 in doubles in 2001
Laura Siegemund	Germany	1988			Ranked world No. 27 in singles in 2016 and world No. 5 in doubles in 2023 • 2020 US Open women's doubles champion • Mixed doubles: 2016 US Open champion • 2023 WTA Finals champion in doubles
Brigitte Simon-Glinel	France	1956			1978 French Open semifinalist
Kateřina Siniaková	(Czech Republic) Czechia	1996			Ranked world No. 1 in doubles in 2018 • 2020 Olympic gold medalist in women's doubles
Susan Sloane-Lundy	United States	1970			Ranked world No. 19 in 1989
Anna Smashnova (Pistolesi)	Israel	1976			Ranked world No. 15 in 2003
Anne Smith	United States	1959			Ranked world No. 12 in 1982 • 1981 Australian Open women's doubles champion • 1980/1982 French Open women's doubles champion • 1980 Wimbledon women's doubles champion • 1981 US Open women's doubles champion • 1980/1984 French Open mixed-doubles champion • 1982 Wimbledon mixed-doubles champion • 1981/1982 US Open mixed-doubles champion
Elizabeth Smylie	Australia	1963			Ranked world No. 20 in singles in 1987 and world No. 5 in doubles in 1988 • 1985 Wimbledon women's doubles champion • 1991 Wimbledon mixed-doubles champion • 1983/1990 US Open mixed-doubles champion
Abigail Spears	United States	1981			2017 Australian Open mixed doubles champion
Hilde Krahwinkel Sperling	Germany; Denmark	1908	1981	3	Ranked world No. 2 at year-end in 1936 • 1935/1936/1937 French Championships champion • 1933 Wimbledon mixed doubles champion
Irina Spîrlea	Romania	1974			Ranked world No. 7 in singles in 1997 and world No. 16 in doubles in 1995
Karolina Šprem	Croatia	1984			Ranked world No. 17 in 2004
Katarina Srebotnik	Slovenia	1981			Ranked world No. 20 in singles in 2006 and world No. 1 in doubles in 2011 • 1999/2006/2010 French Open mixed doubles champion • 2003 US Open mixed doubles champion • 2011 Australian Open mixed doubles champion
Kay Stammers Bullitt	United Kingdom	1914	2005		Ranked world No. 2 at year-end in 1939 • 1935 French Championships women's doubles champion • 1935/1936 Wimbledon women's doubles champion
Carolin Babcock Stark	United States	1912	1987		Ranked world No. 10 at year-end in 1934 and 1936 • 1936 U.S. Championships women's doubles champion
Luisa Stefani	Brazil	1997			Ranked world No. 9 in doubles in 2021 ◌ Doubles: 2020 Olympic bronze medalist in women's doubles • 2021 and 2023 US Open doubles semifinalist • 2023 Wimbledon quarterfinalist • 2024 Australian Open quarterfinalist •2023 Australian Open mixed doubles champion• 2023 French Open mixed doubles quarterfinalist
Sloane Stephens	United States	1993		1	Ranked world No. 3 in singles in 2018 ◌ Singles: 2017 US Open champion
Greer Stevens	South Africa	1957			Ranked world No. 10 at year-end in 1980 • 1980 Wimbledon quarterfinalist
Alexandra Stevenson	United States	1980			Ranked world No. 18 in singles in 2002 and world No. 67 in doubles in 2003
Samantha Stosur	Australia	1984		1	Ranked world No. 4 in singles in 2011 and world No. 1 in doubles in 2006 ◌ Singles: 2011 US Open Champion • 2010 French Open finalist • 2010/2011 WTA Finals semifinalist ◌ Doubles: 2006 French Open champion • 2005 US Open champion • 2005/2006 WTA Finals champion ◌ Mixed doubles: 2005 Australian Open champion • 2008/2014 Wimbledon champion
Betty Stöve	Netherlands	1945			Ranked world No. 5 in 1977 • 1972/1979 French Open women's doubles champion • 1972 Wimbledon women's doubles champion • 1972/1977/1979 US Open women's doubles champion • 1978/1981 Wimbledon mixed-doubles champion • 1977/1978 US Open mixed-doubles champion
Barbora Strýcová	Czech Republic	1986			Ranked world No. 16 in singles in 2017 and world No. 1 in doubles in 2019 • 2016 Olympic bronze medalist in women's doubles
Rennae Stubbs	Australia	1971			Ranked world No. 64 in 1996 • 2000 Australian Open women's doubles champion • 2001/2004 Wimbledon women's doubles champion • 2001 US Open women's doubles champion • 2000 Australian Open mixed-doubles champion • 2001 US Open mixed-doubles champion
Paola Suárez	Argentina	1976			Ranked world No. 9 in singles in 2004 and world No. 1 in doubles in 2002 ◌ Doubles: 2001/2002/2004/2005 French Open champion • 2002/2003/2004 US Open champion • 2004 Australian Open champion
Carla Suárez Navarro	Spain	1988			Ranked world No. 6 in singles in 2016 and world No. 11 in doubles in 2015 ◌ Singles: 2008/2014 French Open quarterfinalist • 2009/2016/2018 Australian Open quarterfinalist • 2013 US Open quarterfinalist
Elena Subirats	Mexico	1947			1968 French Open quarterfinalist
Ai Sugiyama	Japan	1975			Ranked world No. 8 in singles in 2004 and world No. 1 in doubles in 2000 ◌ Doubles: 2000 US Open champion • 2003 French Open champion • 2003 Wimbledon champion ◌ Mixed doubles: 1999 US Open champion
Helena Suková	Czech Republic	1965			Ranked world No. 4 in 1985 • 1990/1992 Australian Open women's doubles champion • 1990 French Open women's doubles champion • 1987/1989/1990/1996 Wimbledon women's doubles champion • 1985/1993 US Open women's doubles champion • 1991 French Open mixed-doubles champion • 1994/1996/1997 Wimbledon mixed-doubles champion • 1993 US Open mixed-doubles champion
Věra Suková	Czechoslovakia	1931	1982		Ranked world No. 5 at the end of the year in 1962 • 1962 Wimbledon finalist • 1957/1963 French semifinalist • 1962 US quarterfinalist ◌ Mixed doubles: 1957 French champion
Sheila Piercey Summers	South Africa	1919	2005		Ranked world No. 6 at the end of the year in 1947 • 1947/1949 French Championships mixed-doubles champion • 1949 Wimbledon mixed-doubles champion
Sun Tiantian	China	1981			Ranked world No. 77 in singles and world No. 16 in doubles in 2007 ◌ Doubles: 2004 Olympics gold medalist ◌ Mixed doubles: 2008 Australian Open champion
Karen Hantze Susman	United States	1942		1	Ranked world No. 4 at the end of the year in 1962 • 1962 Wimbledon champion • 1961/1962 Wimbledon women's doubles champion • 1964 U.S. Championships women's doubles champion
May Sutton Bundy	United States	1886	1975	3	1904 U.S. Championships champion • 1905/1907 Wimbledon champion • 1904 U.S. Championships women's doubles champion
Astrid Suurbeek	Netherlands	1947			1968 Australian Open quarterfinalist
Elina Svitolina	Ukraine	1994			Ranked world No. 3 in singles in 2017 and world No. 108 in doubles in 2015 ◌ Singles: 2019, 2023 Wimbledon semifinalist • 2019 US Open semifinalist • 2018 WTA Finals champion
Mariaan de Swardt	South Africa	1971			Ranked world No. 28 in singles in 1996 and world No. 11 in doubles in 1998 • 1999 Australian Open mixed doubles champion • 2000 French Open mixed doubles champion
Iga Świątek	Poland	2001		6	Singles: ranked world No. 1 in 2022 • 2020, 2022, 2023, 2024 French Open champion, 2022 US Open champion, 2025 Wimbledon ◌ Doubles: 2021 French Open finalist
Éva Szabó	Hungary	1945			1975 French Open quarter-finalist
Ágnes Szávay	Hungary	1988			Ranked world No. 13 in singles in 2008 and world No. 22 in doubles in 2007
Silvija Talaja	Croatia	1978			Ranked world No. 18 in singles in 2000 and world No. 54 in doubles in 2004
Tamarine Tanasugarn	Thailand	1977			Ranked world No. 19 in singles in 2002 and world No. 15 in doubles in 2004
Catherine Tanvier	France	1965			Ranked world No. 20 in singles in 1984 and world No. 16 in doubles in 1986
Billie Tapscott	South Africa	1903	1970		1927 French, 1929 Wimbledon quarterfinalist
Patricia Tarabini	Argentina	1968			Ranked world No. 29 in singles and world No. 12 in doubles in 1888 • 1996 French Open mixed doubles champion
Nathalie Tauziat	France	1967			Ranked world No. 3 in singles in 2000 and world No. 3 in doubles in 2002 ◌ Singles: 1998 Wimbledon finalist • 1991 French Open quarterfinalist • 2000 US Open quarterfinalist
Pam Teeguarden	United States	1951			1977 French Open quarterfinalist
Judy Tegart Dalton	Australia	1937			Ranked world No. 7 at the end of the year in 1968 • 1968 Wimbledon runner-up • 1964/1967/1969/1970 Australian Championships/Open women's doubles champion • 1966 Wimbledon women's doubles champion • 1966 French Championships women's doubles champion • 1970/1971 US Open women's doubles champion
Andrea Temesvári	Hungary	1966			Ranked world No. 7 in 1984 • 1986 French Open women's doubles champion
Aline Terry	United States			1	1893 U.S. Championships champion in singles and doubles
Sandrine Testud	France	1972			Ranked world No. 9 in singles and world No. 8 in doubles in 2000 ◌ Singles: 1997 US Open quarterfinalist • 1998 Australian Open quarterfinalist
Patricia Canning Todd	United States	1922	2015	1	Ranked world No. 4 at the end of the year in 1950 • 1947 French Championships champion • 1948 French Championships women's doubles champion • 1947 Wimbledon women's doubles champion • 1948 French Championships mixed doubles champion
Renáta Tomanová	Czechoslovakia	1954			Ranked world no. 22 ◌ Singles: 1976 Australian Open finalist • 1976 French Open finalist ◌ Doubles: 1978 Australian Open champion ◌ Mixed doubles: 1978 French Open champion
Bertha Townsend	United States	1869	1909	2	1888/1889 U.S. Championships champion
Taylor Townsend	United States	1996			Ranked world No. 2 in doubles in 2025 • 2024 Wimbledon Champion and 2025 Australian Open Champion in doubles
Christine Truman Janes	United Kingdom	1941		1	Ranked world No. 2 at the end of the year in 1959 ◌ Singles: 1959 French champion ◌ Doubles: 1960 Australian champion
Kay Tuckey	United Kingdom	c.1921	2016		Ranked world No. 10 at year-end in 1951 • 1951 Wimbledon quarterfinalist
Linda Tuero	United States	1950			1971 French Open quarter-finalist
Iroda Tulyaganova	Uzbekistan	1982			Ranked world No. 16 in singles and world No. 28 in doubles in 2002
Wendy Turnbull	Australia	1952			Ranked world No. 3 in singles in 1985 • 1977 US Open runner-up • 1979 French Open runner-up • 1980 Australian Open runner-up • 1978 Wimbledon women's doubles champion • 1979 French Open women's doubles champion • 1979/1982 US Open women's doubles champion • 1979/1982 French Open mixed-doubles champion • 1980 US Open mixed-doubles champion • 1983/1984 Australian Open mixed-doubles champion
Lesley Turner Bowrey	Australia	1942		2	Ranked world No. 2 at the end of the year in 1963 • 1963/1965 French Championships champion • 1964/1965/1967 Australian Championships women's doubles champion • 1964/1965 French Championships women's doubles champion • 1964 Wimbledon women's doubles champion • 1961 U.S. Championships women's doubles champion • 1961/1964 Wimbledon mixed doubles champion
C Tyrell	United Kingdom				1926 Wimbledon quarterfinalist
Vladimíra Uhlířová	Czech Republic	1978			Ranked world No. 18 in doubles in 2007
Nicole Vaidišová	Czech Republic	1989			Ranked world No. 7 in singles in 2007 • Singles: 2006 French Open semifinalist • 2007 Australian Open semifinalist • 2007/2008 Wimbledon quarterfinalist
Donna Vekić	Croatia	1996			Ranked world No. 17 in 2025 • 2024 Olympic silver medalist
Lucia Valerio	Italy	1905	1996		1933 Wimbledon quarterfinalist
Molly Van Nostrand	United States	1965			1985 Wimbledon quarterfinalist
Coco Vandeweghe	United States	1991			Ranked world No. 9 in singles in 2017 and world No. 18 in doubles in 2016 • Singles: 2017 Australian Open semifinalist • 2017 US Open semifinalist • 2015/2017 Wimbledon quarterfinalist
Yvonne Vermaak	South Africa	1956			Ranked world No. 20 in 1983
Elena Vesnina	Russia	1986			Ranked world No. 13 in singles in 2017 and world No. 1 in doubles in 2018 • 2013 French Open women's doubles champion • 2014 US Open women's doubles champion • 2016 Australian Open mixed doubles champion • 2016 Olympics women's doubles gold medalist
Roberta Vinci	Italy	1983			Ranked world No. 12 in singles in 2013 and world No. 1 in doubles in 2012 • Year-end world No. 1 in doubles in 2012 • 2012 French Open women's doubles champion • 2012 US Open women's doubles champion • 2013 Australian Open women's doubles champion • ITF World Champion in doubles, 2012 (with Sara Errani)
Julie Vlasto	France	1903	1985		1924 Olympic silver medalist
Erika Vollmer	Germany	1925	2021		1953 Wimbledon quarterfinalist
Markéta Vondroušová	(Czech Republic) Czechia	1999		1	Ranked No. 6 in 2023 in Singles • 2023 Wimbledon champion • 2020 Olympic silver medalist
Vlasta Vopičková	Czechoslovakia	1944			1968 and 1970 French Open quarter-finalist
Bernice Carr Vukovich	South Africa	1938			1960 US Open quarter-finals
Virginia Wade	United Kingdom	1945		3	Ranked world No. 2 at the end of the year in 1968 • 1968 US Open champion • 1977 Wimbledon champion • 1972 Australian Open champion • 1973 Australian Open women's doubles champion • 1973 French Open women's doubles champion • 1973 and 1975 US Open women's doubles champion
Jean Walker-Smith	United Kingdom	1924	2010		Ranked world No. 5 at the end of the year in 1951 • 1951 French Championships semifinalist
Wang Qiang	China	1992			Ranked world No. 22 in singles in 2018
Patricia Ward Hales	United Kingdom	1929	1985		Ranked world No. 8 at the end of the year in 1956
Heather Watson	United Kingdom	1992			2016 Wimbledon mixed doubles champion
Maud Watson	United Kingdom	1864	1946	2	1884/1885 Wimbledon champion
Phoebe Holcroft Watson	United Kingdom	1898	1980		Ranked world No. 2 at year-end in 1929 • 1929 U.S. Championships runner-up • 1928/1929 Wimbledon women's doubles champion • 1929 U.S. Championships women's doubles champion • 1928 French Championships women's doubles champion
Maria Teran Weiss	Argentina	1918	1984		1948/1952 French quarterfinalist
Alice Weiwers	Luxembourg				1946 French quarterfinalist
Mimi Arnold	United States	1939			1958 Wimbledon quarterfinalist
Nancy Chaffee	United States	1929	2002		Ranked world No. 4 at year-end in 1951 • 1951 Wimbledon quarterfinalist
Anne White	United States	1961			Ranked world No. 19 in singles in 1986 and world No. 18 in doubles in 1988
Robin White	United States	1963			Ranked world No. 15 in singles in 1987 and world No. 8 in doubles in 1990 • 1988 US Open women's doubles champion • 1989 US Open mixed-doubles champion
Eileen Bennett Whittingstall	United Kingdom	1907	1979		Ranked world No. 3 at year-end in 1931 • 1928 French Championships runner-up • 1931 U.S. Championships runner-up • 1928/1931 French Championships women's doubles champion • 1931 U.S. Championships women's doubles champion • 1928/1929 French Championships mixed-doubles champion • 1927 U.S. Championships mixed-doubles champion
Yanina Wickmayer	Belgium	1989			Ranked world No. 12 in singles and world No. 72 in doubles in 2010 ◌ Singles: 2009 US Open semifinalist
Judith Wiesner	Austria	1966			Ranked world No. 12 in singles in 1997 and world No. 29 in doubles in 1989 • 1996 Wimbledon quarterfinalist • 1996 US Open quarterfinalist
Hazel; Hotchkiss Wightman	United States	1886	1974	4	1909/1910/1911/1919 U.S. Championships champion • 1909/1910/1911/1915/1924/1928 U.S. Championships women's doubles champion • 1924 Wimbledon women's doubles champion • 1909/1910/1911/1915/1918/1920 U.S. Championships mixed doubles champion • 1924 Olympic gold medalist in women's doubles and mixed doubles
Serena Williams	United States	1981		23	Ranked world No. 1 at the end of the year in 2002, 2009, 2013, 2014 and 2015, and ranked world No. 1 in doubles in 2010 • ITF World Champion: singles, 2002, 2009, 2012; doubles, 2009 (with Venus Williams) • 2003/2005/2007/2009/2010/2015/2017 Australian Open champion • 2002/2013/2015 French Open champion • 2002/2003/2009/2010/2012/2015/2016 Wimbledon champion • 1999/2002/2008/2012/2013/2014 US Open champion • 2012 Olympic Singles Gold Medalist • 2000/2008/2012 Olympic Doubles Gold Medalist • 2001/2003/2009/2010 Australian Open women's doubles champion • 1999/2010 French Open women's doubles champion • 2000/2002/2008/2009/2012/2016 Wimbledon women's doubles champion • 1999/2009 US Open women's doubles champion • 1998 Wimbledon mixed-doubles champion • 1998 US Open mixed-doubles champion • Ranked world No. 1 for a total of 300 weeks One of the Williams sisters (with Venus).
Venus Williams	United States	1980		7	Ranked world No. 1 in singles in 2002 and world No. 1 in doubles in 2010 • ITF World Champion in doubles, 2009 (with Serena Williams) • 2000/2001/2005/2007/2008 Wimbledon champion • 2000/2001 US Open champion • 2000 Olympic Singles Gold Medalist • 2000/2008/2012 Olympic Doubles Gold Medalist • 2001/2003/2009/2010 Australian Open women's doubles champion • 1999/2010 French Open women's doubles champion • 2000/2002/2008/2009/2012/2016 Wimbledon women's doubles champion • 1999/2009 US Open women's doubles champion • 1998 Australian Open mixed-doubles champion • 1998 French Open mixed-doubles champion • Ranked world No. 1 for a total of 11 weeks One of the Williams sisters (with Serena).
Ruth Winch	United Kingdom	1870	1952		1908 Olympic bronze medalist
Julia Wipplinger	South Africa	1923			1952 French quarterfinalist
Marianne Werdel Witmeyer	United States	1967			Ranked world No. 21 in singles in 1995 and world No. 45 in doubles in 1992
Caroline Wozniacki	Denmark	1990		1	Ranked world No. 1 in singles at the end of the year in 2010 and world No. 52 in doubles in 2014 ◌ Singles: 2018 Australian Open champion • 2009/2014 US Open finalist • 2010/2017 French Open quarterfinalist • 2017 WTA Finals champion
Aleksandra Wozniak	Canada	1987			Ranked world No. 21 in 2009
Qinwen Zheng	China	2002			Ranked world No. 5 in 2024 • 2024 Olympics Singles Gold Medal Winner
Yan Zi	China	1984			Ranked world No. 40 in singles in 2008 and world No. 4 in doubles in 2006 • 2006 Australian Open women's doubles champion • 2006 Wimbledon women's doubles champion
Billie Yorke	United Kingdom	1910	2000		Doubles: 1936/1937/1938 French Championships champion 1937 Wimbledon champion
Zhang Shuai	China	1989			Ranked world No. 23 in singles in 2016
Zheng Jie	China	1983			Ranked world No. 15 in singles in 2009 and world No. 3 in doubles in 2006 • 2006 Australian Open women's doubles champion • 2006 Wimbledon women's doubles champion
Radka Zrubáková	Czech Republic	1970			Ranked world No. 22 in singles in 1991 and world No. 38 in doubles in 1993
Fabiola Zuluaga	Colombia	1979			Ranked world No. 16 in singles in 2005
Natasha Zvereva	Belarus	1971			Ranked world No. 5 in singles in 1989 and world No. 1 in doubles in 1991 • 1989/1992/1993/1994/1995/1997 French Open women's doubles champion • 1991/1992/1995/1996 US Open women's doubles champion • 1991/1992/1993/1994/1997 Wimbledon women's doubles champion • 1993/1994/1997 Australian Open women's doubles champion • 1990 & 1995 Australian Open mixed-doubles champion
Vera Zvonareva	Russia	1984			Ranked world No. 2 in singles in 2010 and world No. 9 in doubles in 2005 • 2006 US Open women's doubles champion • 2012 Australian Open women's doubles champion • 2004 US Open mixed-doubles champion • 2006 Wimbledon mixed-doubles champion

== See also ==
- List of male tennis players
- List of sportspeople
- List of WTA number 1 ranked singles tennis players
- List of WTA number 1 ranked doubles tennis players
- Top ten ranked female tennis players
- Top ten ranked female tennis players (1921–1974)
- List of Grand Slam women's singles champions
