= 1903 U.S. National Championships – Women's singles =

Women's singles
- 1903 U.S. National Championships

Final
- Champion: (United States) Elisabeth Moore
- Runner-up: (United States) Marion Jones
- Score: 7–5, 8–6

Details
- Draw: 11
- Seeds: –

Events
Singles	men	women
Doubles	men	women
← 1902 ·	U.S. National Championships	· 1904 →

Elisabeth Moore won the singles tennis title of the 1903 U.S. Women's National Singles Championship by defeating reigning champion Marion Jones 7–5, 8–6 in the challenge round. Moore had won the right to challenge Jones by defeating Carrie Neely 6–2, 6–4 in the final of the All Comers' competition. The event was played on outdoor grass courts and held at the Philadelphia Cricket Club in Wissahickon Heights, Chestnut Hill, Philadelphia, from June 24 through June 27, 1903.

== Draw ==
=== Challenge round ===
Challenge Round
(United States) Marion Jones	5	6
(United States) Elisabeth Moore	7	8

=== All Comers' finals ===
Quarterfinals
(United States) Marjorie Oberteuffer	6	6
(United States) Gertrude Fetterman	2	3
(United States) Elisabeth Moore	6	6
(United States) Miriam Hall	2	0
(United States) Carrie Neely	6	6
(United States) Clara Chase	0	1
(United States) Helen Chapman	6	8
(United States) Corrine Mock	1	6

Semifinals
(United States) Marjorie Oberteuffer	0	0
(United States) Elisabeth Moore	6	6
(United States) Carrie Neely	6	6
(United States) Helen Chapman	0	1

Finals
(United States) Elisabeth Moore	6	6
(United States) Carrie Neely	2	4

Preceded by 1903 Wimbledon Championships – Women's singles	Grand Slam women's singles	Succeeded by 1904 Wimbledon Championships – Women's singles
