= 1902 U.S. National Championships – Women's singles =

Women's singles
- 1902 U.S. National Championships

Final
- Champion: (United States) Marion Jones
- Runner-up: (United States) Elisabeth Moore
- Score: 6–1, 1–0, ret.

Details
- Draw: 17
- Seeds: –

Events
Singles	men	women
Doubles	men	women
← 1901 ·	U.S. National Championships	· 1903 →

Marion Jones won the singles tennis title of the 1902 U.S. Women's National Singles Championship by defeating reigning champion Elisabeth Moore 6–1, 1–0, in the challenge round. Moore was unwell during the challenge match and partially fainted at the beginning of the second set due to the onset of a high fever and subsequently had to default. Jones had won the right to challenge Moore by defeating Carrie Neely 8–6, 6–4 in the final of the All Comers' competition. The event was played on outdoor grass courts and held at the Philadelphia Cricket Club in Wissahickon Heights, Chestnut Hill, Philadelphia from June 24 through June 27, 1902.

The United States National Lawn Tennis Association (USNLTA) changed the format for the matches from best-of-five to best-of-three sets.

== Draw ==
=== Challenge round ===
Challenge Round
(United States) Elisabeth Moore	1	0^{r}
(United States) Marion Jones	6	1

=== All Comers' finals ===
Quarterfinals
(United States) Clara Chase	1	3
(United States) Juliette Atkinson	6	6
(United States) Carrie Neely	6	6
(United States) Winona Closterman	2	0
(United States) Helen Chapman	6	3	7
(United States) Amy Fielding	4	6	5
(United States) Marion Jones	6	6
(United States) Marie Wimer	4	0

Semifinals
(United States) Juliette Atkinson	6	6	2
(United States) Carrie Neely	8	3	6
(United States) Helen Chapman	1	0
(United States) Marion Jones	6	6

Finals
(United States) Carrie Neely	6	4
(United States) Marion Jones	8	6

Preceded by 1902 Wimbledon Championships – Women's singles	Grand Slam women's singles	Succeeded by 1903 Wimbledon Championships – Women's singles
