= 1903 U.S. National Championships (tennis) =

- Date: August 18–26 (M); June 24–27 (W)
- Edition: 23rd
- Category: Grand Slam
- Surface: Grass
- Location: Newport, R.I., United States (M); Philadelphia, PA, United States (W)

Champions

Men's singles
- (United Kingdom) Laurence Doherty

Women's singles
- (United States) Elisabeth Moore

Men's doubles
- (United Kingdom) Reginald Doherty / (United Kingdom) Laurence Doherty

Women's doubles
- (United States) Elisabeth Moore / (United States) Carrie Neely

Mixed doubles
- (United States) Helen Chapman / (United States) Harry Allen
- U.S. National Championships

The 1903 U.S. National Championships (now known as the US Open) was a tennis tournament that took place in June and August of 1903. The women's tournament was held from June 24 to June 27 on the outdoor grass courts at the Philadelphia Cricket Club in Philadelphia, Pennsylvania. The men's tournament was held from August 16 to August 24 on the outdoor grass courts at the Newport Casino in Newport, Rhode Island. It was the 23rd United States National Championships and the second Grand Slam tournament of the year. British Laurence Doherty became the first non-US winner of the men's championship.

== Finals ==
=== Men's singles ===
(United Kingdom) Laurence Doherty (GBR) defeated (United States) William Larned (USA) 6–0, 6–3, 10–8

=== Women's singles ===
(United States) Elisabeth Moore (USA) defeated (United States) Marion Jones (USA) 7–5, 8–6

=== Men's doubles ===
(United Kingdom) Reginald Doherty (GBR) / (United Kingdom) Laurence Doherty (GBR) defeated (United States) Kreigh Collins (USA) / (United States) Harry Wainder (USA) 7–5, 6–3, 6–3

=== Women's doubles ===
(United States) Elisabeth Moore (USA) / (United States) Carrie Neely (USA) defeated (United States) Miriam Hall (USA) / (United States) Marion Jones (USA) 4–6, 6–1, 6–1

=== Mixed doubles ===
(United States) Helen Chapman (USA) / (United States) Harry Allen (USA) defeated (United States) Carrie Neely (USA) / (United States) W. H. Rowland (USA) 6–4, 7–5

Preceded by 1903 Wimbledon Championships	Grand Slams	Succeeded by 1904 Wimbledon Championships
