= 1901 U.S. National Championships – Women's singles =

Women's singles
- 1901 U.S. National Championships

Final
- Champion: (United States) Elisabeth Moore
- Runner-up: (United States) Myrtle McAteer
- Score: 6–4, 3–6, 7–5, 2–6, 6–2

Details
- Draw: 11
- Seeds: –

Events
Singles	men	women
Doubles	men	women
← 1900 ·	U.S. National Championships	· 1902 →

Elisabeth Moore won the singles tennis title of the 1901 U.S. Women's National Singles Championship by defeating reigning champion Myrtle McAteer 6–4, 3–6, 7–5, 2–6, 6–2 in the challenge round. The draw included four past or present champions. Moore had won the right to challenge McAteer by defeating Marion Jones 4–6, 1–6, 9–7, 9–7, 6–3 in the final of the All Comers' competition. The event was played on outdoor grass courts and held at the Philadelphia Cricket Club in Wissahickon Heights, Chestnut Hill, Philadelphia from June 25 through June 29, 1901.

== Draw ==
=== Challenge round ===
Challenge Round
(United States) Myrtle McAteer	4	6	5	6	2
(United States) Elisabeth Moore	6	3	7	2	6

=== All Comers' finals ===
Quarterfinals
(United States) Elisabeth Moore	6	7
(United States) Carrie Neely	1	5
(United States) Juliette Atkinson	6	6
(United States) Helen Huey	2	4
(United States) Emma Warren	7	6
(United States) Georgina Jones	5	4
(United States) Helen Dillingham	w/o
(United States) Marion Jones

Semifinals
(United States) Elisabeth Moore	6	9
(United States) Juliette Atkinson	2	7
(United States) Emma Warren	1	2
(United States) Marion Jones	6	6

Finals
(United States) Elisabeth Moore	4	1	9	9	6
(United States) Marion Jones	6	6	7	7	3

Preceded by 1901 Wimbledon Championships – Women's singles	Grand Slam women's singles	Succeeded by 1902 Wimbledon Championships – Women's singles
