= 1903 Wimbledon Championships – Women's singles =

Women's singles
- 1903 Wimbledon Championships

Final
- Champion: (United Kingdom) Dorothea Douglass
- Runner-up: (United Kingdom) Ethel Thomson
- Score: 4–6, 6–4, 6–2

Details
- Draw: 28
- Seeds: –

Events
Singles	men	women
Doubles	men	women
← 1902 ·	Wimbledon Championships	· 1904 →

Dorothea Douglass defeated Ethel Thomson 4–6, 6–4, 6–2 in the all comers' final to win the ladies' singles tennis title at the 1903 Wimbledon Championships. The reigning champion Muriel Robb did not defend her title.

== Draw ==
=== Key ===
- Q = Qualifier
- WC = Wild card
- LL = Lucky loser
- Alt = Alternate
- ITF = ITF entry
- PR = Protected ranking
- SR = Special ranking
- SE = Special exempt
- JE = Junior exempt
- JR = Junior Accelerator Programme entrant
- CO = College Accelerator Programme entrant
- NG = Next Gen Accelerator Program entrant
- w/o = Walkover
- r = Retired
- d = Defaulted

=== All comers' finals ===
Semifinals
(United Kingdom) Toupie Lowther	4	2
(United Kingdom) Dorothea Douglass	6	6
(United Kingdom) Ethel Thomson	6	6
(United Kingdom) Alice Greene	3	1

Final
(United Kingdom) Dorothea Douglass	4	6	6
(United Kingdom) Ethel Thomson	6	4	2

=== Top half ===
First round
(United Kingdom) E Walter
(United Kingdom) Bertha Steedman	w/o
(United Kingdom) Agnes Morton	6	6
(United Kingdom) CHE Meyer	1	3
(United Kingdom) Hilda Lane	6	8
(United Kingdom) Ellen Mary Stawell-Brown	2	6
(United Kingdom) Gertrude Houselander	6	6
(United Kingdom) M Stoneham	1	1
(United Kingdom) Violet Pinckney	0
(United Kingdom) A Bell	0^{r}
(United Kingdom) Dorothea Douglass
(United Kingdom) Mrs Riseley	w/o

Second round
(United Kingdom) Toupie Lowther	8	6
(United Kingdom) Winifred Longhurst	6	3
(United Kingdom) E Walter	2	2
(United Kingdom) A Morton	6	6
(United Kingdom) H Lane	6	1	7
(United Kingdom) G Houselander	1	6	9
(United Kingdom) V Pinckney	w/o
(United Kingdom) D Douglass

Quarterfinals
(United Kingdom) T Lowther	6	6
(United Kingdom) A Morton	1	0
(United Kingdom) G Houselander	2	0
(United Kingdom) D Douglass	6	6

Semifinals
(United Kingdom) T Lowther	4	2
(United Kingdom) D Douglass	6	6

=== Bottom half ===
First round
(United Kingdom) Constance Wilson	1	6	6
(United Kingdom) Edith Greville	6	2	2
(United Kingdom) L Ripley
(United Kingdom) Mrs M Chatterton	w/o
(United Kingdom) EL Bosworth	6	6
(United Kingdom) Henrietta Horncastle	1	1
(United Kingdom) Ethel Thomson	6	6
(United Kingdom) Beryl Tulloch	3	2
(United Kingdom) H Smythe
(United Kingdom) CB Bell	w/o
(United Kingdom) Edith Bromfield	6	6
(United Kingdom) EA Longhurst	3	3

Second round
(United Kingdom) C Wilson	6	6
(United Kingdom) L Ripley	2	1
(United Kingdom) EL Bosworth	4	1
(United Kingdom) E Thomson	6	6
(United Kingdom) H Smythe	0	2
(United Kingdom) E Bromfield	6	6
(United Kingdom) Alice Greene	6	6
(United Kingdom) Mrs Newton	1	2

Quarterfinals
(United Kingdom) C Wilson	4	6
(United Kingdom) E Thomson	6	8
(United Kingdom) E Bromfield	0	6	3
(United Kingdom) A Greene	6	4	6

Semifinals
(United Kingdom) E Thomson	6	6
(United Kingdom) A Greene	3	1

Preceded by 1902 U.S. National Championships – Women's singles	Grand Slam women's singles	Succeeded by 1903 U.S. National Championships – Women's singles
