= 1901 U.S. National Championships (tennis) =

- Date: August 19–27 (M); June 25–29 (W)
- Edition: 21st
- Category: Grand Slam
- Surface: Grass
- Location: Newport, R.I., United States (M); Philadelphia, PA, United States (W)

Champions

Men's singles
- (United States) William Larned

Women's singles
- (United States) Elisabeth Moore

Men's doubles
- (United States) Holcombe Ward / (United States) Dwight Davis

Women's doubles
- (United States) Juliette Atkinson / (United States) Myrtle McAteer

Mixed doubles
- (United States) Marion Jones / (United States) Raymond Little
- U.S. National Championships

The 1901 U.S. National Championships (now known as the US Open) was a tennis tournament that took place in June and August of 1901. The women's tournament was held from June 25 to June 29 on the outdoor grass courts at the Philadelphia Cricket Club in Philadelphia, Pennsylvania. The men's tournament was held from August 19 to August 27 on the outdoor grass courts at the Newport Casino in Newport, Rhode Island. It was the 21st U.S. National Championships and the second Grand Slam tournament of the year.

== Finals ==
=== Men's singles ===
(United States) William Larned defeated (United States) Beals Wright 6–2, 6–8, 6–4, 6–4

=== Women's singles ===
(United States) Elisabeth Moore defeated (United States) Myrtle McAteer 6–4, 3–6, 7–5, 2–6, 6–2

=== Men's doubles ===
(United States) Holcombe Ward / (United States) Dwight Davis defeated (United States) Leo Ware / (United States) Beals Wright 6–3, 9–7, 6–11

=== Women's doubles ===
(United States) Juliette Atkinson / (United States) Myrtle McAteer defeated (United States) Marion Jones / (United States) Elisabeth Moore default

=== Mixed doubles ===
(United States) Marion Jones / (United States) Raymond Little defeated (United States) Myrtle McAteer / (United States) Clyde Stevens 6–4, 6–4, 7–5

Preceded by 1901 Wimbledon Championships	Grand Slams	Succeeded by 1902 Wimbledon Championships
