= 1902 U.S. National Championships (tennis) =

- Date: August 18–27 (M); June 24–27 (W)
- Edition: 22nd
- Category: Grand Slam
- Surface: Grass
- Location: Newport, R.I., United States (M); Philadelphia, PA, United States (W)

Champions

Men's singles
- (United States) William Larned

Women's singles
- (United States) Marion Jones

Men's doubles
- (United Kingdom) Reginald Doherty / (United Kingdom) Laurence Doherty

Women's doubles
- (United States) Juliette Atkinson / (United States) Marion Jones

Mixed doubles
- (United States) Elisabeth Moore / (United States) Wylie Grant
- U.S. National Championships

The 1902 United States National Championships (now known as the US Open) was a Grand Slam tennis tournament that took place in June and August of 1902. The men's tournament was held from August 18 to August 27 on the outdoor grass courts at the Newport Casino in Newport, Rhode Island. The women's tournament was held from June 24 to June 27 on the outdoor grass courts at the Philadelphia Cricket Club in Philadelphia, Pennsylvania, United States. It was the 22nd U.S. National Championships and the second Grand Slam tournament of the year. William Larned and Marion Jones won the singles titles.

== Finals ==
=== Men's singles ===
(United States) William Larned defeated (United Kingdom) Reginald Doherty 4–6, 6–2, 6–4, 8–6

=== Women's singles ===
(United States) Marion Jones defeated (United States) Elisabeth Moore 6–1, 1–0, ret.

=== Men's doubles ===
(United Kingdom) Reginald Doherty / (United Kingdom) Laurence Doherty defeated (United States) Holcombe Ward / (United States) Dwight F. Davis 11–9, 12–10, 6–4

=== Women's doubles ===
(United States) Juliette Atkinson / (United States) Marion Jones defeated (United States) Maud Banks / (United States) Winona Closterman 6–2, 7–5

=== Mixed doubles ===
(United States) Elisabeth Moore / (United States) Wylie Grant defeated (United States) Elizabeth Rastall / (United States) Albert Hoskins 6–2, 6–1

Preceded by 1902 Wimbledon Championships	Grand Slams	Succeeded by 1903 Wimbledon Championships
