= Wylie Grant =

American tennis player

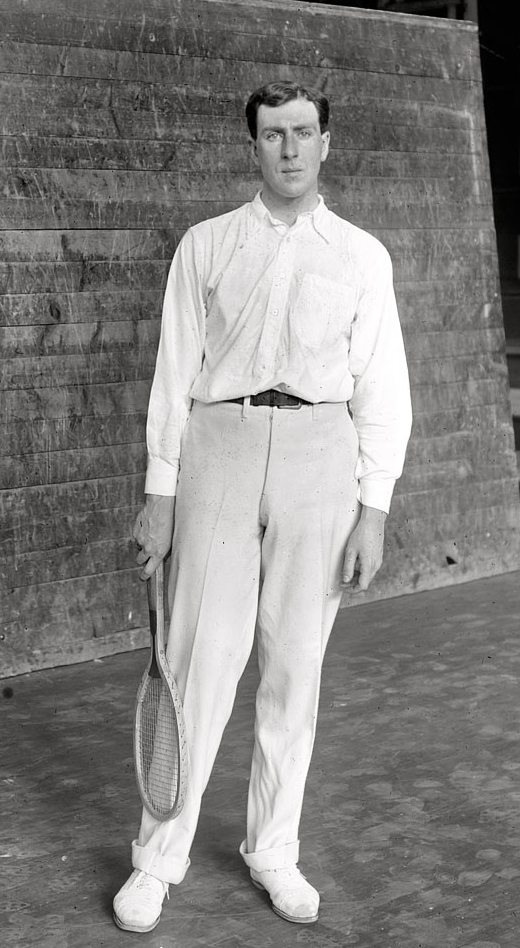
- Grant in 1908
- Full name: Wylie Cameron Grant
- Country (sports): United States
- Born: November 24, 1879 Brooklyn, New York, US
- Died: November 16, 1968 (aged 88) Stratford, Ontario, Canada

Grand Slam singles results
- Wimbledon: 4R (1908)
- US Open: 3R (1899)

Other tournaments
- Olympic Games: 1R (1900)

Grand Slam mixed doubles results
- US Open: W (1902, 1904)

Wylie Cameron Grant (November 24, 1879 – November 16, 1968) was an American tennis champion.

In 1902 and 1904 he won the U.S. National Championships mixed doubles title together with Elisabeth Moore. He was the singles runner-up at the Irish Championships in 1908.

== Biography ==
Grant was born on November 24, 1879. In 1894, Grant first entered the singles at the U.S. Championships aged 14 years 8 months and is the youngest men's singles competitor in the tournament's history. He lost in the first round to N. Lord.

In 1905 Grant and Edward Dewhurst made it to the final round of the lawn tennis doubles championship at the St. Nicholas Rink.

Grant won the singles title at the U.S. National Indoor Tennis Championships, played on wooden courts at the Seventh Regiment Armory in New York, on five occasions (1903, 1904, 1906, 1908 and 1912).

In 1914 Grant and George C. Shafer took the title from Gustave F. Touchard and William Cragin, in the championship round of the U. S. men's indoor doubles in New York City.

== Grand Slam finals ==
=== Mixed doubles (2 titles) ===
Result	Year	Championship	Surface	Partner	Opponents	Score
Win	1902	U.S. National Championships	Grass	(United States) Elisabeth Moore	(United States) Elizabeth Rastall (United States) Albert L. Hoskins	6–2, 6–1
Win	1904	U.S. National Championships	Grass	(United States) Elisabeth Moore	(United States) May Sutton (United States) F. B. Dallas	6–2, 6–1

== See also ==
- List of US Open mixed doubles champions
