= 1901 Wimbledon Championships – Women's singles =

Women's singles
- 1901 Wimbledon Championships

Final
- Champion: (United Kingdom) Charlotte Sterry
- Runner-up: (United Kingdom) Blanche Hillyard
- Score: 6–2, 6–2

Details
- Draw: 30
- Seeds: –

Events
Singles	men	women
Doubles	men	women
← 1900 ·	Wimbledon Championships	· 1902 →

Charlotte Sterry defeated Louisa Martin 6–3, 6–4 in the All Comers' Final, and then defeated the reigning champion Blanche Hillyard 6–2, 6–2 in the challenge round to win the ladies' singles tennis title at the 1901 Wimbledon Championships. Mme Pop was the first female competitor from France to participate in the Wimbledon Championships.

== Draw ==
=== Key ===
- Q = Qualifier
- WC = Wild card
- LL = Lucky loser
- Alt = Alternate
- SE = Special exempt
- PR = Protected ranking
- ITF = ITF entry
- JE = Junior exempt
- w/o = Walkover
- r = Retired
- d = Defaulted
- SR = Special ranking

=== Challenge round ===
Challenge Round
(United Kingdom) Charlotte Sterry	6	6
(United Kingdom) Blanche Hillyard	2	2

=== All comers' finals ===
Semifinals
(United Kingdom) Louisa Martin	7	6
(United Kingdom) Agnes Morton	5	2
(United Kingdom) Charlotte Sterry	6	6
(United Kingdom) Miss Adams	1	1

Final
(United Kingdom) Louisa Martin	3	4
(United Kingdom) Charlotte Sterry	6	6

=== Top half ===
First round
(United Kingdom) Edith Greville	6	6
(United Kingdom) CHE Meyer	1	0
(United Kingdom) Louisa Martin
(United Kingdom) Mrs M Chatterton	w/o
(United Kingdom) Mrs Norton Barry	6	6
(United Kingdom) CB Bell	3	0
(United Kingdom) E Monckton	8	7
(United Kingdom) A Bell	6	5
(United Kingdom) Agnes Morton	6	6
(United Kingdom) Edith Johnson	2	2
(United Kingdom) Alice Pickering	6	6	6
(United Kingdom) Ellen Mary Stawell-Brown	8	2	1
(United Kingdom) Toupie Lowther
(United Kingdom) Miss Francis	w/o

Second round
(France) Mme Popp	0	1
(United Kingdom) E Greville	6	6
(United Kingdom) L Martin	6	4	6
(United Kingdom) Mrs N Barry	4	6	1
(United Kingdom) E Monckton	1	2
(United Kingdom) A Morton	6	6
(United Kingdom) A Pickering	7	6
(United Kingdom) T Lowther	5	1

Quarterfinals
(United Kingdom) E Greville	6	3	4
(United Kingdom) L Martin	4	6	6
(United Kingdom) A Morton	6	7
(United Kingdom) A Pickering	3	5

Semifinals
(United Kingdom) L Martin	7	6
(United Kingdom) A Morton	5	2

=== Bottom half ===
First round
(United Kingdom) Ellen Evered
(United Kingdom) Henrietta Horncastle	w/o
(United Kingdom) Muriel Robb	7	6	6
(United Kingdom) Ruth Winch	9	4	4
(United Kingdom) Dorothea Douglass	7	6	6
(United Kingdom) Edith Bromfield	9	1	3
(United Kingdom) Charlotte Sterry	6	6
(United Kingdom) Ruth Durlacher	2	4
(United Kingdom) Miss Hughes D'Aeth	6	6
(United Kingdom) Beryl Tulloch	3	2
(United Kingdom) C Parsons-Smith
(United Kingdom) C Webber	w/o
(United Kingdom) Miss Adams	6	6
(United Kingdom) A Martin	0	0

Second round
(United Kingdom) E Evered	3	6	3
(United Kingdom) M Robb	6	4	6
(United Kingdom) D Douglass	4	2
(United Kingdom) C Sterry	6	6
(United Kingdom) Miss Hughes D'Aeth
(United Kingdom) C Parsons-Smith	w/o
(United Kingdom) Miss Adams
(United Kingdom) D Slater	w/o

Quarterfinals
(United Kingdom) M Robb	0	0
(United Kingdom) C Sterry	6	6
(United Kingdom) Miss Hughes D'Aeth	1	0
(United Kingdom) Miss Adams	6	6

Semifinals
(United Kingdom) C Sterry	6	6
(United Kingdom) Miss Adams	1	1

Preceded by 1900 U.S. National Championships – Women's singles	Grand Slam women's singles	Succeeded by 1901 U.S. National Championships – Women's singles
