= 1902 Wimbledon Championships – Women's singles =

Tennis tournament

Women's singles
- 1902 Wimbledon Championships

Final
- Champion: (United Kingdom) Muriel Robb
- Runner-up: (United Kingdom) Charlotte Sterry
- Score: 7–5, 6–1

Details
- Draw: 22
- Seeds: –

Events
Singles	men	women
Doubles	men	women
← 1901 ·	Wimbledon Championships	· 1903 →

Muriel Robb defeated Agnes Morton 6–2, 6–4 in the All Comers' Final, and then defeated the reigning champion Charlotte Sterry 7–5, 6–1 in the challenge round to win the ladies' singles tennis title at the 1902 Wimbledon Championships, after their first match was abandoned at 4–6, 13–11 due to rain.

== Draw ==
=== Key ===
- Q = Qualifier
- WC = Wild card
- LL = Lucky loser
- Alt = Alternate
- SE = Special exempt
- PR = Protected ranking
- ITF = ITF entry
- JE = Junior exempt
- w/o = Walkover
- r = Retired
- d = Defaulted
- SR = Special ranking

=== Challenge round ===
Challenge Round
(United Kingdom) Muriel Robb	7	6
(United Kingdom) Charlotte Sterry	5	1

=== All comers' finals ===
Semifinals
(United Kingdom) Muriel Robb	6	2	9
(United Kingdom) Dorothea Douglass	4	6	7
(United Kingdom) Agnes Morton	7	6
(United Kingdom) Edith Greville	5	4

Final
(United Kingdom) Muriel Robb	6	6
(United Kingdom) Agnes Morton	2	4

=== Top half ===
First round
(United Kingdom) Dorothea Douglass
(United Kingdom) Henrietta Horncastle	w/o
(United Kingdom) Ruth Durlacher
(United Kingdom) Beryl Tulloch	w/o
(United Kingdom) Alice Greene	6	6
(United Kingdom) Ellen Mary Stawell-Brown	1	3

Second round
(United Kingdom) Hilda Lane	6	6	9
(United Kingdom) Blanche Hillyard	2	8	7
(United Kingdom) Muriel Robb	6	4	6
(United Kingdom) Edith Bromfield	3	6	4
(United Kingdom) E Godfrey	w/o
(United Kingdom) D Douglass
(United Kingdom) R Durlacher	6	6
(United Kingdom) A Greene	3	2

Quarterfinals
(United Kingdom) H Lane	1	5
(United Kingdom) M Robb	6	7
(United Kingdom) D Douglass	6	10
(United Kingdom) R Durlacher	2	8

Semifinals
(United Kingdom) M Robb	6	2	9
(United Kingdom) D Douglass	4	6	7

=== Bottom half ===
First round
(United Kingdom) CHE Meyer
(United Kingdom) Edith Johnson	w/o
(United Kingdom) Winifred Longhurst
(United Kingdom) E Burrill	w/o
(United Kingdom) Agnes Morton	6	6
(United Kingdom) Ethel Thomson	4	4

Second round
(United Kingdom) CHE Meyer	1	2
(United Kingdom) W Longhurst	6	6
(United Kingdom) A Morton
(United Kingdom) Mrs LR Hausberg	w/o
(United Kingdom) Edith Greville
(United Kingdom) CB Bell	w/o
(United Kingdom) Bertha Steedman	6	8	6
(United Kingdom) Constance Wilson	3	10	4

Quarterfinals
(United Kingdom) W Longhurst	3	4
(United Kingdom) A Morton	6	6
(United Kingdom) E Greville	6	3	6
(United Kingdom) B Steedman	1	6	2

Semifinals
(United Kingdom) A Morton	7	6
(United Kingdom) E Greville	5	4

Preceded by 1901 U.S. National Championships – Women's singles	Grand Slam women's singles	Succeeded by 1902 U.S. National Championships – Women's singles
