= Muriel Robb =

English tennis player (1878–1907)

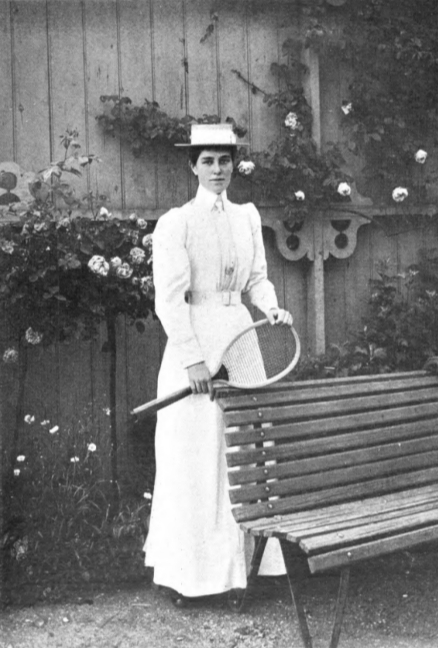
- Full name: Muriel Evelyn Robb
- Country (sports): United Kingdom
- Born: 13 May 1878 Newcastle upon Tyne, England
- Died: 12 February 1907 (aged 28) Newcastle upon Tyne, England
- Plays: Right–handed

Singles

Grand Slam singles results
- Wimbledon: W (1902)

Other tournaments

Muriel Evelyn Robb (13 May 1878 – 12 February 1907) was an English female tennis player. She is best remembered for her ladies' singles title at the 1902 Wimbledon Championships. She also won the Irish and Scottish singles titles in 1901 and the Welsh singles title in 1899. She attended the Cheltenham Ladies’ College, in Gloucestershire from 1893 to 1897 and was a member of the Jesmond Lawn Tennis Club in Newcastle. From 1899 to 1902, she participated in four Wimbledon Championships and reached at least the quarterfinals on all occasions.

She was diagnosed with Lymphadenoma and battled the disease for two years and four months before she died on 12 February 1907 in Jesmond, Newcastle upon Tyne. The death certificate listed “exhaustion and cardiac failure” as the immediate cause.

== Grand Slam record ==
=== Wimbledon ===
- Singles champion: 1902

This match set a record for the longest women's final. On the first day of play rain stopped play at 4–6, 13–11. It was replayed the next day when Robb won 7–5, 6–1.

== Grand Slam finals ==
=== Singles (1 title) ===
Result	Year	Championship	Surface	Opponent	Score
Win	1902	Wimbledon	Grass	(United Kingdom) Charlotte Cooper Sterry	7–5, 6–1

== Grand Slam performance timeline ==
Key
W	F	SF	QF	#R	RR	Q#	DNQ	A	NH

(W) winner; (F) finalist; (SF) semifinalist; (QF) quarterfinalist; (#R) rounds 4, 3, 2, 1; (RR) round-robin stage; (Q#) qualification round; (DNQ) did not qualify; (A) absent; (NH) not held; (SR) strike rate (events won / competed); (W–L) win–loss record.

	1899	1900	1901	1902
Wimbledon	QF	QF	QF	W

=== See also ===
- Performance timelines for all female tennis players since 1978 who reached at least one Grand Slam final
