= Miriam Hall =

American tennis player

- Born: November 17, 1877
- Died: June 18, 1954 (aged 76); Alameda County, California, U.S.
- College: University of California, Berkeley

Doubles

Grand Slam doubles results
- US Open: 1st (1904); 2nd (1903)

Miriam Hall (November 17, 1877 - June 18, 1954), was an American tennis player of the start of the 20th century. She was the first woman player from San Francisco to draw national attention when she lost the 1903 U.S. Women's National Championship doubles finals with partner Marion Jones of Southern California. Notably, in 1904, she won the women's doubles at the U.S. Women's National Championship with 17-year-old May Sutton. Circa 1911, she attended University of California, Berkeley, where she became its top player for the next few years while in her 30s. She wrote an instructional book Tennis for Girls in 1914. She coached tennis, including serving as women's tennis coach of UC-Berkeley for at least the 1915 season. She later taught tennis at a private school in Berkeley. She never married and died in Alameda County, California.

== Grand Slam finals ==
=== Doubles (1 title, 1 runner-up) ===
Result	Year	Championship	Surface	Partner	Opponents	Score
Loss	1903	U.S. National Championships	Grass	(United States) Marion Jones	(United States) Elisabeth Moore (United States) Carrie Neely	6–4, 1–6, 1–6
Win	1904	U.S. National Championships	Grass	(United States) May Sutton	(United States) Elisabeth Moore (United States) Carrie Neely	3–6, 6–3, 6–3
