= Elisabeth Moore =

American tennis player (1876–1959)

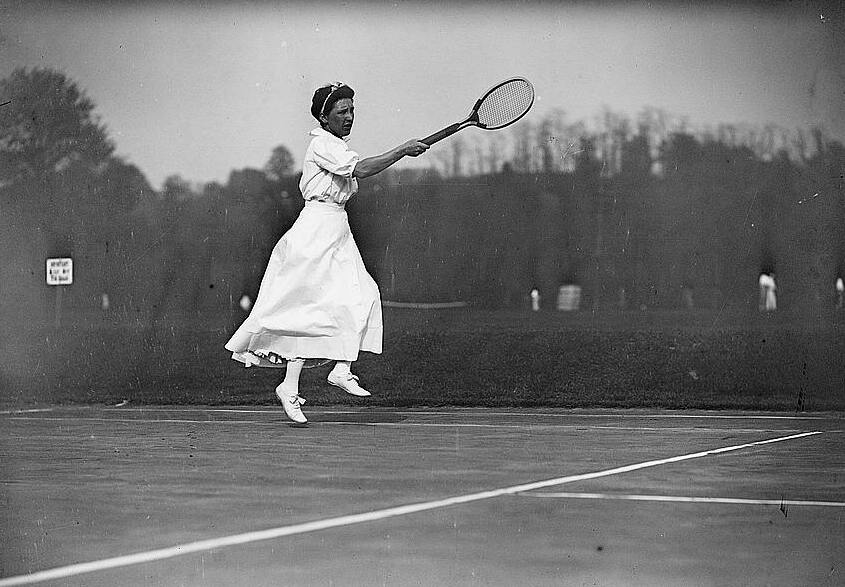
- Moore circa 1912
- Full name: Elisabeth Holmes Moore
- Country (sports): United States
- Born: March 5, 1876 Brooklyn, New York, United States
- Died: January 22, 1959 (aged 82) Starke, Florida, United States
- Plays: Right-handed (one-handed backhand)
- Int. Tennis HoF: 1971 (member page)

Grand Slam singles results
- US Open: W (1896, 1901, 1903, 1905)

Grand Slam doubles results
- US Open: W (1896, 1903)

Grand Slam mixed doubles results
- US Open: W (1902, 1904)

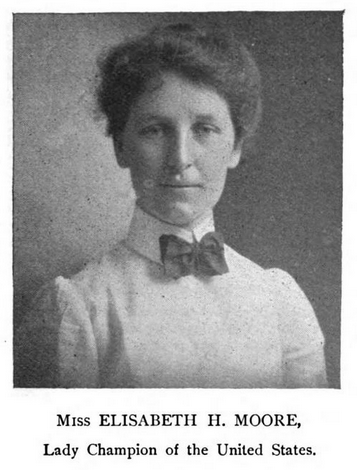
Elisabeth Holmes Moore, from a 1902 publication.

Elisabeth 'Bessie' Holmes Moore (March 5, 1876 – January 22, 1959) was an American tennis champion who was active at the beginning of the 20th century. Moore won the singles title at the U.S. Championships on four occasions. She was inducted into the International Tennis Hall of Fame in 1971.

== Biography ==
Elisabeth Moore was born on March 5, 1876, in Brooklyn, the daughter of George Edward Moore (1840–1911), an affluent cotton broker, and Sarah Z. Orr (1857–1942). She was raised and schooled in Ridgewood, New Jersey. She learned to play tennis at age 12. Moore reached her first U.S. National Championships singles final in 1892 at the age of 16 years and three months, losing to Mabel Cahill from Ireland in the first five-set match contested between two women. In the final years of the 19th century, she had a rivalry with Juliette Atkinson.

She won the inaugural U.S. Indoor Women's Singles Championship in 1907, defeating Marie Wagner in the final in three sets. In 1908, she also won the inaugural indoor doubles title with partner Helen Pouch.

Elisabeth Moore died on January 22, 1959, in Starke, Florida, from congestive heart failure.

== Grand Slam finals ==
=== Singles (4 titles, 5 runners-up) ===
Result	Year	Championship	Surface	Opponent	Score
Loss	1892	U.S. National Championships	Grass	(Republic of Ireland) Mabel Cahill	7–5, 3–6, 4–6, 6–4, 2–6
Win	1896	U.S. National Championships	Grass	(United States) Juliette Atkinson	6–4, 4–6, 6–2, 6–2
Loss	1897	U.S. National Championships	Grass	(United States) Juliette Atkinson	3–6, 3–6, 6–4, 6–3, 3–6
Win	1901	U.S. National Championships	Grass	(United States) Myrtle McAteer	6–4, 3–6, 7–5, 2–6, 6–2
Loss	1902	U.S. National Championships	Grass	(United States) Marion Jones	1–6, 0–1 retired
Win	1903	U.S. National Championships	Grass	(United States) Marion Jones	7–5, 8–6
Loss	1904	U.S. National Championships	Grass	(United States) May Sutton	1–6, 2–6
Win	1905	U.S. National Championships	Grass	(United States) May Sutton	default
Loss	1906	U.S. National Championships	Grass	(United States) Helen Homans	default

=== Doubles (2 titles, 3 runner-ups) ===
Result	Year	Championship	Surface	Partner	Opponents	Score
Loss	1895	U.S. National Championships	Grass	(United States) Amy Williams	(United States) Juliette Atkinson (United States) Helen Hellwig	2–6, 2–6, 10–12
Win	1896	U.S. National Championships	Grass	(United States) Juliette Atkinson	(United States) Annabella C. Wistar (United States) Amy Williams	6–4, 7–5
Loss	1901	U.S. National Championships	Grass	(United States) Marion Jones	(United States) Juliette Atkinson (United States) Myrtle McAteer	default
Win	1903	U.S. National Championships	Grass	(United States) Carrie Neely	(United States) Miriam Hall (United States) Marion Jones	6–4, 6–1, 6–1
Loss	1904	U.S. National Championships	Grass	(United States) Carrie Neely	(United States) May Sutton Bundy (United States) Miriam Hall	6–3, 3–6, 3–6

=== Mixed doubles (2 titles) ===
Result	Year	Championship	Surface	Partner	Opponents	Score
Win	1902	U.S. National Championships	Grass	(United States) Wylie Grant	(United States) Elizabeth Rastall (United States) Albert L. Hoskins	6–2, 6–1
Win	1904	U.S. National Championships	Grass	(United States) Wylie Grant	(United States) May Sutton (United States) F. B. Dallas	6–2, 6–1
