= Marion Jones Farquhar =

American tennis player (1879–1965)

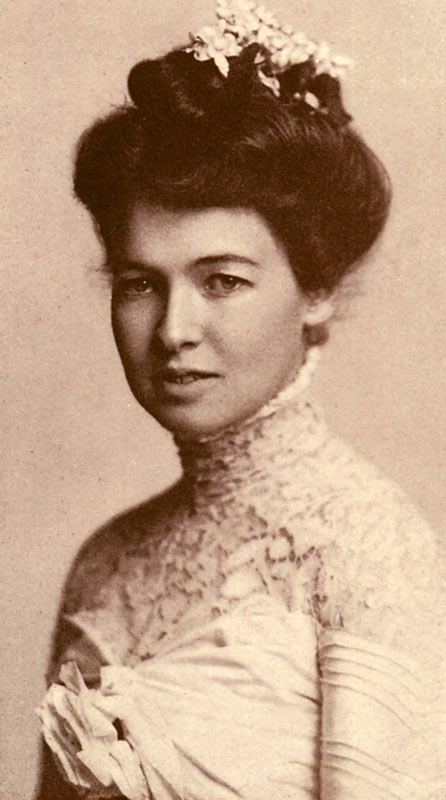
- Country (sports): United States
- Born: November 2, 1879 Gold Hill, Nevada, U.S.
- Died: March 14, 1965 (aged 85) Los Angeles, California, U.S.
- Plays: Right-handed
- Int. Tennis HoF: 2006 (member page)

Singles
- Career record: no value

Grand Slam singles results
- Wimbledon: QF (1900)
- US Open: W (1899, 1902)

Doubles
- Career record: no value

Grand Slam doubles results
- US Open: W (1902)

Grand Slam mixed doubles results
- US Open: W (1901)
Medal record
Olympic Games
Representing United States
Bronze medal – third place	1900 Paris	Singles
Representing a Mixed team
Bronze medal – third place	1900 Paris	Mixed doubles

Marion Jones Farquhar (née Jones; November 2, 1879 – March 14, 1965) was an American tennis player. She won the women's singles titles at the 1899 and 1902 U.S. Championships. She was inducted into the International Tennis Hall of Fame in 2006.

== Early life ==
Jones was the daughter of Nevada Senator John Percival Jones, co-founder of the town of Santa Monica, California, and Georgina Frances Sullivan.

== Career ==
Jones was the first Californian to reach the finals at the women's U.S. Tennis Championships in 1898 where she had a championship point against Juliette Atkinson but lost in five sets. She won the U.S. women's tennis title in 1899 and 1902, and the U.S. mixed doubles title in 1901. At the 1900 Summer Olympics, she was the first American woman to win an Olympic medal. Her sister, Georgina also competed in the 1900 Olympic tennis events. In 1900, Jones was the first non-British woman to play at Wimbledon where she reached the quarterfinals in which she was eliminated by G.E. Evered in straight sets.

She was mainly a baseline player who possessed a solid backhand and forehand and who had good accuracy in her shots.

== Grand Slam finals ==
=== Singles : 2 titles, 2 runners-up ===
Result	Year	Championship	Surface	Opponent	Score
Loss	1898	U.S. Championships	Grass	(United States) Juliette Atkinson	3–6, 7–5, 4–6, 6–2, 5–7
Win	1899	U.S. Championships	Grass	(United States) Maud Banks	6–1, 6–1, 7–5
Win	1902	U.S. Championships (2)	Grass	(United States) Elisabeth Moore	6–1, 1–0 retired
Loss	1903	U.S. Championships	Grass	(United States) Elisabeth Moore	5–7, 6–8

=== Doubles : 1 titles, 2 runners-up ===
Result	Year	Championship	Surface	Partner	Opponents	Score
Loss	1901	U.S. Championships	Grass	(United States) Elisabeth Moore	(United States) Juliette Atkinson (United States) Myrtle McAteer	default
Win	1902	U.S. Championships	Grass	(United States) Juliette Atkinson	(United States) Maud Banks (United States) Winona Closterman	6–2, 7–5
Loss	1903	U.S. Championships	Grass	(United States) Miriam Hall	(United States) Elisabeth Moore (United States) Carrie Neely	6–4, 1–6, 1–6

=== Mixed doubles : 1 title ===
Result	Year	Championship	Surface	Partner	Opponents	Score
Win	1901	U.S. Championships	Grass	(United States) Raymond Little	(United States) Myrtle McAteer (United States) Clyde Stevens	6–4, 6–4, 7–5

== Personal life ==
She married architect Robert D. Farquhar in New York City, in 1903. They had three children: David Farquhar (1904 – 1977), John Percival Farquhar (1912 – 1993) and Colin Farquhar (1913 – 1967). From 1920 until 1961, Marion Jones Farquhar lived in Greenwich Village, where she was well known as a violinist and voice coach. She also translated opera librettos and for a short time was head of the New York Chamber Opera. In 1961, she moved back to Los Angeles, where she lived until her death.
