= 1903 U.S. National Championships – Men's singles =

Men's singles
- 1903 U.S. National Championships

Final
- Champion: (United Kingdom) Laurence Doherty
- Runner-up: (United States) William Larned
- Score: 6–0, 6–3, 10–8

Events
Singles	men	women
Doubles	men	women
← 1902 ·	U.S. National Championships	· 1904 →

Laurence Doherty defeated the two-time defending champion William Larned 6–0, 6–3, 10–8 to win the men's singles tennis title at the 1903 U.S. National Championships. Doherty had defeated William Clothier in the All Comers' Final, which was delayed by a day due to rain.

The event was held at the Newport Casino in Newport, R.I., United States. The entry list consisted of 97 players, which was slightly smaller than that of the previous year.

== Challenge round ==
Challenge Round
(United States) William Larned	0	3	8
(United Kingdom) Laurence Doherty	6	6	10

== Draw ==
=== All Comers' finals ===
Quarterfinals
(United States) R.C. Seaver	3	2	1
(United States) Richard Carleton	6	6	6
(United Kingdom) Reginald Doherty
(United Kingdom) Laurence Doherty	w/o
(United States) Edward Larned	6	4	6	6
(United States) Bob Huntington	0	6	0	3
(United States) Harry Allen	3	1	2
(United States) William Clothier	6	6	6

Semifinals
(United States) Richard Carleton	2	0	0
(United Kingdom) Laurence Doherty	6	6	6
(United States) Edward Larned	3	1	2
(United States) William Clothier	6	6	6

Finals
(United Kingdom) Laurence Doherty	6	6	6
(United States) William Clothier	3	2	3

=== Earlier rounds ===
Section 1

First round

Second round
(United States) Waidner	4	12	2	6	6
(United States) Jones	6	10	6	4	1
(United States) Seaver	2	1	3
(United States) Conner	6	6	6
(United States) Sedgwick	1	5	8	2
(United States) Norman	6	7	6	6
(United States) Dionne	2	6	6	8	7
(United States) Cole	6	3	8	6	5

Third round
(United States) Waidner	d.	f.
(United States) Seaver
19	(United States) Norman	4	3	2
(United States) Dionne	6	6	6

Fourth round
(United States) Seaver	6	6	7
(United States) Dionne	1	0	5

Section 2

First round

Second round
(United States) Cross	2	5	0
(United States) Carleton	6	7	6
(United States) Freshman	6	6	4	3	6
(United States) Behr	1	3	6	6	1
(United States) Bailey	1	2	4
(United States) Whitman	6	6	6
(United States) Neeley
(United States) Smith	w/o

Third round
(United States) Carleton	6	6	6
(United States) Freshman	2	3	3
(United States) Whitman	3	8	6	7
(United States) Smith	6	6	0	5

Fourth round
(United States) Carleton	6	6	6
7	(United States) Whitman	3	2	1

Section 3

First round

Second round
(United States) Ryerson	0	1	1
(United States) Collins	6	6	6
(United States) Merrill	1	2	1
(United Kingdom) RF Doherty	6	6	6
(United States) Henshaw	4	1	2
(United States) Paret	6	6	6
(United States) Horton	3	4	4
(United States) Beals	6	6	6

Third round
(United States) Collins	2	6	8	3
(United Kingdom) RF Doherty	6	2	10	6
(United States) Paret	3	8	6	10
(United States) Beals	6	6	3	8

Fourth round
(United Kingdom) RF Doherty	6	6	6
(United States) Paret	0	1	2

Section 4

First round
(United States) Relyea	0	1	1
(United Kingdom) HL Doherty	6	6	6
(United States) Stevens	6	6	6
(United States) Dana	0	1	1
(United States) Leech
(United States) Stiness	w/o
(United States) Miller	6	6	7
(United States) Henshaw	0	1	5
(United States) Peters
(United Kingdom) Dering	w/o
(United States) Gates	4	6	4	4
(United States) Stillman	6	2	6	6
3	(United States) Otis
(United Kingdom) Mahony	w/o

Second round
(United States) Colket	2	2	0
(United Kingdom) HL Doherty	6	6	6
(United States) Stevens	w/o
(United States) Stiness
(United States) Miller	7	6	7	6
(United Kingdom) Dering	5	8	9	8
(United States) Stillman	3	2	3
(United Kingdom) Mahony	6	6	6

Third round
9	(United Kingdom) HL Doherty	6	6	6
(United States) Stevens	4	2	2
(United Kingdom) Dering	5	3	2
(United Kingdom) Mahony	7	6	6

Fourth round
(United Kingdom) HL Doherty	6	6	6
3	(United Kingdom) Mahony	3	2	4

Section 5

First round
(United States) Read	6	4	5	4
(United States) Horton	4	6	7	6
(United States) Mahan	6	6	6
(United States) Adee	3	3	2
(United States) Slocum	w/o
(United States) Thomas
(United States) Melland	6	6	6
(United States) Burlingame	0	0	0
(United States) EP Larned	6	6	6
(United States) Clarke	1	1	3
(United States) Bartlett	3	5	6	1
(United States) Scott	6	7	4	6

Second round
(United States) Horton	8	4	7	6
(United States) Mahan	6	6	5	0
(United States) Slocum	5	2	4
(United States) Melland	7	6	6
17	(United States) EP Larned	6	6	6
(United States) Scott	2	2	2
(United States) Manson
(United States) Avery	w/o

Third round
(United States) Horton	6	8	8
(United States) Melland	3	6	6
(United States) EP Larned	6	6	6
(United States) Avery	2	3	1

Fourth round
(United States) Horton	7	6	2
(United States) EP Larned	9	8	6

Section 6

First round

Second round
(United States) Morris	1	0	1
(United States) Leonard	6	6	6
(United States) White	7	2	1	6	3
(United States) Bull	5	6	6	3	6
(United States) Burden	6	6	6
(United States) Scott	4	0	4
(United States) Hoskins	2	2	2
5	(United States) Huntington	6	6	6

Third round
(United States) Leonard	6	6	6
(United States) Bull	1	4	2
(United States) Burden	1	2	4
5	(United States) Huntington	6	6	6

Fourth round
(United States) Leonard	11	7	4	5	3
(United States) Huntington	9	5	6	7	6

Section 7

First round

Second round
(United States) Codman	7	6	6
(United States) Appleton	5	2	3
(United States) Blanding	w/o
(United States) Devens
(United States) Reid
(United States) Ridgway	w/o
(United States) Havermayer
(United States) Allen	w/o

Third round
(United States) Codman	6	6	6
(United States) Blanding	3	0	1
(United States) Ridgway	5	4	1
(United States) Allen	7	6	6

Fourth round
(United States) Codman	0	2	0
(United States) Allen	6	6	6

Section 8

First round

Second round
(United States) Lamb	1	2	3
(United States) Ward	6	6	6
(United States) Willis	6	6	6
(United States) Livermore	2	4	4
(United States) Holt
(United States) Sands	w/o
(United States) Wright	6	4	4	1
(United States) Clothier	4	6	6	6

Third round
(United States) Ward	w/o
(United States) Willis
(United States) Sands	2	6	3	1
1	(United States) Clothier	6	4	6	6

Fourth round
(United States) Ward	2	4	7	5
(United States) Clothier	6	6	5	7

Preceded by 1903 Wimbledon Championships – Men's singles	Grand Slam men's singles	Succeeded by 1904 Wimbledon Championships – Men's singles
