= 1901 U.S. National Championships – Men's singles =

Men's singles
- 1901 U.S. National Championships

Final
- Champion: (United States) William Larned
- Runner-up: (United States) Malcolm Whitman
- Score: walkover

Events
Singles	men	women
Doubles	men	women
← 1900 ·	U.S. National Championships	· 1902 →

William Larned defeated Beals Wright in the all comers' final, 6–2, 6–8, 6–4, 6–4 to win the men's singles tennis title at the 1901 U.S. National Championships. Three-time reigning champion Malcolm Whitman did not defend his title. The event was held at the Newport Casino in Newport, R.I., United States.

== Draw ==
=== Challenge round ===
Challenge round
(United States) MD Whitman
(United States) W Larned	w/o

=== Finals ===
Semifinals
(United States) LE Ware	3	2	2
(United States) W Larned	6	6	6
(United States) RD Little	5	6	1	2
(United States) BC Wright	7	2	6	6

Final
(United States) W Larned	6	6	6	6
(United States) BC Wright	2	8	4	4

=== Earlier rounds ===
==== Section 1 ====
First round
FC Mahoney	w/o
(United States) RC Seaver
(United States) H Avery	6	6	6
(United States) L Adams	0	2	4
(United States) EW Leonard	w/o
(United States) E Stille
(United States) G Vaughan	4	6	6	3	6
C Allison	6	2	1	6	1

Second round
(United States) LE Ware	6	6	6
(United States) DB Eldridge	0	1	1
(United States) H Oelrichs	4	2	1
(United States) JS Seabury	6	6	6
FC Mahoney	0	2	1
(United States) H Avery	6	6	6
(United States) EW Leonard	6	3	6	6
(United States) G Vaughan	4	6	3	1

Third round
(United States) LE Ware	6	6	6
(United States) JS Seabury	1	4	2
(United States) H Avery	3	8	3	2
(United States) EW Leonard	6	6	6	6

Quarterfinals
(United States) LE Ware	6	6	6
(United States) EW Leonard	2	2	1

==== Section 2 ====
First round
(United States) IC Wright	7	2	6	2	6
(United States) JD Pell	5	6	2	6	3
(United States) R Stevens	6	6	6
(United States) R Leroy	4	2	3
(United States) F Alexander	6	6	6
(United States) C Pell	1	1	2
(United States) W Larned	6	6	6
TA McGinley	0	2	2
(United States) DG Eldridge	6	6	4	6
(United States) G Grisworld	1	2	6	0
(United States) WL Foulke	6	6	6
JJ Astor	2	2	4
(United States) K McEnroe	w/o
(United States) H Hackett
(United States) EP Larned	6	6	6
(United States) NG Johnson	1	2	0

Second round
(United States) IC Wright	6	4	0
(United States) R Stevens	8	8	6
(United States) F Alexander	2	3	2
(United States) W Larned	6	6	6
(United States) DG Eldridge	1	3	0
(United States) WL Foulke	6	6	6
(United States) K McEnroe
(United States) EP Larned	w/o

Third round
(United States) R Stevens	1	5	6
(United States) W Larned	6	7	8
(United States) WL Foulke	0	1	1
(United States) EP Larned	6	6	6

Quarterfinals
(United States) W Larned	w/o
(United States) EP Larned

==== Section 3 ====
First round
(United States) DF Appleton	6	6	6
EC Potter	0	1	0
(United States) RD Little	6	8	8
L Wilmerding	3	6	6
(United States) NH Mundy	w/o
IT Burden
(United States) W Kurtz	6	6	6
(United States) R Honey	1	2	0
(United States) W Clothier	6	6	6
(United States) CS Lee	0	1	1
(United States) A Stillman	w/o
(United States) EP Fischer
(United States) J Parmly Paret	6	6	6
(United States) CE Sands	3	3	2
JB Read	w/o
(United States) K Collins

Second round
(United States) DF Appleton	1	2	1
(United States) RD Little	6	6	6
(United States) NH Mundy	0	2	0
(United States) W Kurtz	6	6	6
(United States) W Clothier	6	6	6
(United States) A Stillman	2	0	1
(United States) J Parmly Paret	5	6	9	6
JB Read	7	3	7	1

Third round
(United States) RD Little	6	6	6
(United States) W Kurtz	1	3	4
(United States) W Clothier	6	0	6	4	6
(United States) J Parmly Paret	1	6	3	6	4

Quarterfinals
(United States) RD Little	6	10	1	6
(United States) W Clothier	3	8	6	1

==== Section 4 ====
First round
(United States) D Davis	6	6	6
SC Whipple	2	1	2
(United States) H Ward	w/o
GS Keyes
(United States) BC Wright	6	6	6
(United States) C Childs	2	3	1
(United States) P Pierson	w/o
(United States) H Plummer

Second round
(United States) D Davis	1	6	6	6
(United States) H Ward	6	2	3	4
(United States) BC Wright	6	6	6
(United States) P Pierson	1	0	2
CL Grimestead
L De Forrest	w/o
(United States) C Hobart	6	6	6
AF Fuller	2	0	3

Third round
(United States) D Davis	2	6	3
(United States) BC Wright	6	8	6
L De Forrest	0	3	0
(United States) C Hobart	6	6	6

Quarterfinals
(United States) BC Wright	6	8	6
(United States) C Hobart	3	6	4

Preceded by 1901 Wimbledon Championships – Men's Singles	Grand Slam men's singles	Succeeded by 1902 Wimbledon Championships – Men's singles
