= Tennis Club de Paris =

Tennis club in Paris, France

Coordinates: 48°50′5″N 2°15′25″E

- Nickname: TCP
- Sport: Tennis, Padel, etc.
- Founded: 1895
- Based in: Paris
- Location: 15 avenue Félix-D'Hérelle 75016 Paris
- Colours: Blue and Green
- President: Jean-François Alcan

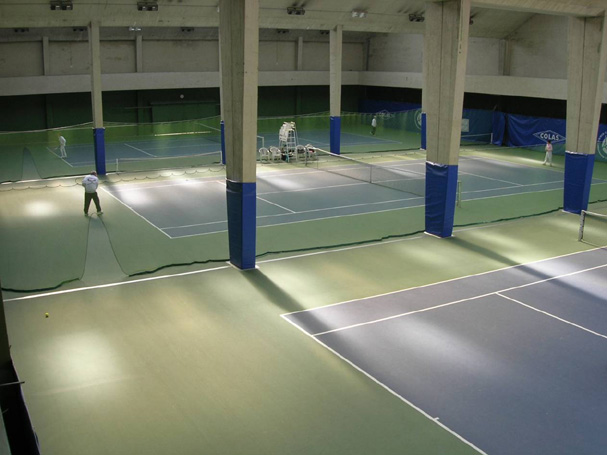
Covered quickset courts

Tennis Club de Paris (Tennis Club of Paris), also known as the TCP, is a tennis club founded in 1895 in Paris.

== History ==
=== 1895 to 1930 ===
In 1895, a few sportsmen, including Armand Masson and Paul Lecaron, had the idea of creating a tennis club that would bring together covered parquet courts and open clay courts.

These first founding members of the TCP, who were also patrons, financed the rental of a piece of land located at the corner of rue de Civry (at no. 2) and boulevard Exelmans and extending as far as boulevard Murat, halfway between Porte d'Auteuil and Porte de Saint Cloud, by means of shares at a nominal rate of 5,000 francs. They had just formed the Société Anonyme Immobilière du Tennis Club de Paris. In association with the owner of the land, they also financed the construction of 4 covered parquet courts and 5 open clay courts. In compensation for their financing, the first founding members were admitted as life members of the TCP, but legal disputes ensued as the club's financial balance was precarious.

Members of the TCP included some of the earliest French tennis players. Before the First World War, the champions of the time like André Gobert and Max Decugis played at the TCP. They are followed by the Four Musketeers: Jean Borotra, Jacques Brugnon, Henri Cochet, and René Lacoste.

In 1923, the TCP adopted the law of 1901 and became the Association Sportive du Tennis Club de Paris, tenant of the SA Immobilière du TCP. Albert Canet was the first President of the TCP as an Association under the 1901 law. He later became President of the French Lawn Tennis Federation.

=== 1930 to 1945 ===
In 1930, on the death of his friend Albert Canet, Jean Borotra took over the presidency of the TCP, which then had about 1000 members. The lease on the rue de Civry had not been renewed. It was then that from 1934 onwards, Jean Borotra, helped by Georges Glasser, Gabriel Guy, Pierre Candeliez, efficient members of the Committee and Robert Foulon, Secretary of the French Lawn Tennis Federation, undertook to convince the Government, the City of Paris and the Sports Federations of the need to build, with the collaboration of the TCP, a large multisports stadium unprecedented in Europe. This operation, carried out with the collaboration of the State, the City of Paris, the TCP itself, and the 1937 Exhibition, could be realised and in 1938 the TCP moved into new premises.

It was therefore necessary to appeal to new founding members to finance the complete fitting out of the new TCP. The payment was 15,000 francs and each founding member was entitled to all the benefits of the club for 20 years, i.e. until 1958 (at that time, the active membership fee was 1,500 francs per year with the benefits that still exist today: balls, lights, hut, and towels). Thanks to this technical and financial effort, the TCP signed a 50-year lease with the City of Paris in 1937. These facilities, in great demand in the capital, were fully used by all the sports federations in covered halls.

The complex included a section administered by the city, which took the name of "Stade Pierre-de-Coubertin" and included a large covered stadium with 4000 seats and another small stadium with about 800 seats; a second small stadium was to be built later. Another section was rented to the TCP with a large hall with 6 covered wooden courts, a fitness room as well as the lounges, restaurants, luxuriously furnished changing rooms, and ancillary facilities necessary for the life of a large club. The TCP itself had built 8 clay courts (six of which were unfortunately separated by the Avenue Georges Lafont).

The operation proved to be balanced in 1938 and 1939. The winter sports events were played there included the French International Championships, the Paris-London Meeting, etc. and the King Gustav V of Sweden Cup, created by Jean Borotra and the TCP for this occasion.

As World War II broke out, from September 1939 to May 1940, the TCP saw reduced activities under the leadership of Robert Foulon. During the German Occupation of France, the TCP gradually resumed moderate activities, until September 15, 1943, the date of the last bombing of Paris, when an American squadron, charged with attacking Renault's "O" factory located on the Ile Seguin, used for the assembly of German tanks, collaterally-damaged the "Stade de Coubertin – TCP" complex, which was completely destroyed by 12 500-kilogram bombs.

=== 1945 to 1965 ===
At the end of the war, Pierre Candeliez, President of the TCP, with the help of his Committee and the support of the French Lawn Tennis Federation, obtained the reconstruction of this sports complex from the City of Paris. The joint efforts of the city, the Federation, and the TCP gradually returned the buildings to their original form: first the open courts, then the covered courts, and finally the large stadium.

On the other hand, the construction of the ancillary facilities was significantly delayed; the difficulties associated with this period did not allow it to be carried out again with the same splendour as in 1937, but it nevertheless met the expectations of the members. The TCP alone had to face the task of repairing its installations and interior fittings.

In order to collect the necessary funds, Jean Borotra, with 6 Davis Cup victories under his belt, organised and carried out major trips around the world in 1947: the United States, Africa and Asia. This initiative was well-received by multiple players, including Robert Abdesselam, Marcel Bernard, Jacques Brugnon, Henri Cochet, Bernard Destremau, and his teammates Roger Dubuc and Gil de Kermadec.

The return of the Tennis Club de Paris with the provision of the new covered courts coincided with its victory in the French men's team championship in 1950. During the winter, the club's facilities were used for important tournaments such as the Tournoi de la Toussaint, the Coupe Canet or the French International Championships on covered courts. As the facilities of the Coubertin Stadium are no longer large enough to ensure sufficient revenue for professional players, the top players ceased playing at the TCP. Pierre Candeliez died prematurely in 1951, and Georges Glasser took over the presidency until 1965.

=== from 1965 to the present day ===
The TCP men's first team won the French team championship in 1987, more than 37 years after their first title. For the men's team, this was their second and last title, as the following year, it was the club's women's team who won their first title in the women's championship. This title was held until 1990, when it was relinquished to the Basque Coast club. It was not until 13 years later that a TC Paris team reached the final of the championship and lost 6–2 to TC Thionville in Toulouse.

The men's team lost the 2012 championship final 4–0 to Villa Primrose, a Bordeaux club that had been waiting for a title for over a hundred years. After a surprise defeat by the small club TC Quimperlé in the final the following year, the Parisian club was crowned French Champion in 2014 for its third consecutive final against TC Lille, winning 4–2 in the final after having swept Sarcelles in the semi-final, despite being the arch-favourite this year.

== Presidents ==
- 1895–1923 Paul Lecaron
- 1924–1930 Albert Canet
- 1931–1941 Jean Borotra
- 1942–1951 Pierre Candeliez
- 1952–1965 Georges Glasser
- 1966–1974 Gabriel Guy
- 1975–1985 Jacques Carot
- 1986–1986 Dominique Droulers
- 1987–1992 Jean-Pierre Courcol
- 1993–1995 Alain Pfirter
- 1996–1999 Philippe Seghers
- 2000–2004 Michel Leclercq
- 2005–Incumbent Jean-François Alcan

== Achievements ==
- French men's team champion (3) :
  - Winner in 1950, 1987 and 2014
  - Finalist in 2012, 2013 and 2015
- French women's team champion (5):
  - Winner in 1927, 1988, 1989, 1990 and 2015

== Notable players ==
=== Men ===
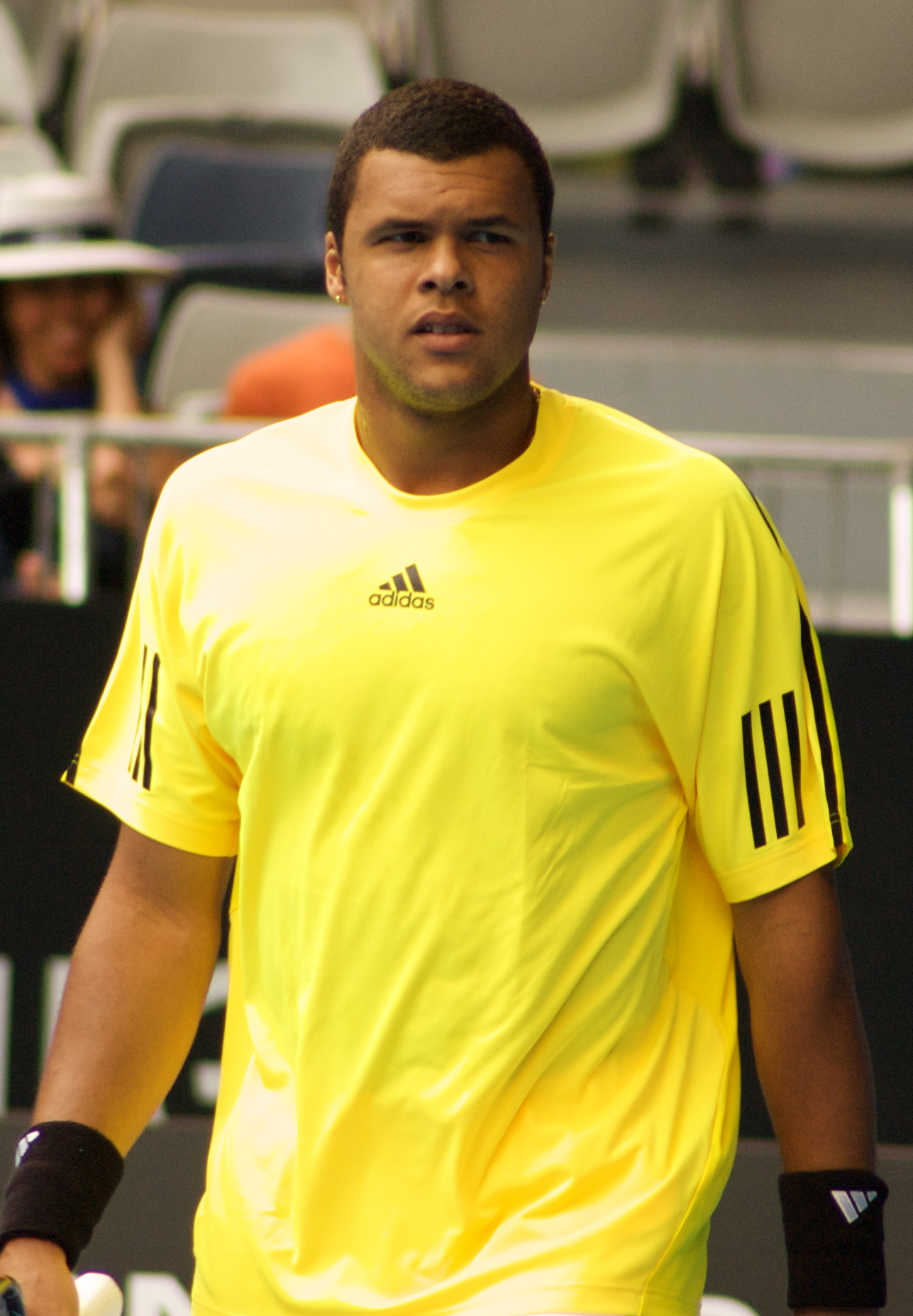
Jo-Wilfried Tsonga

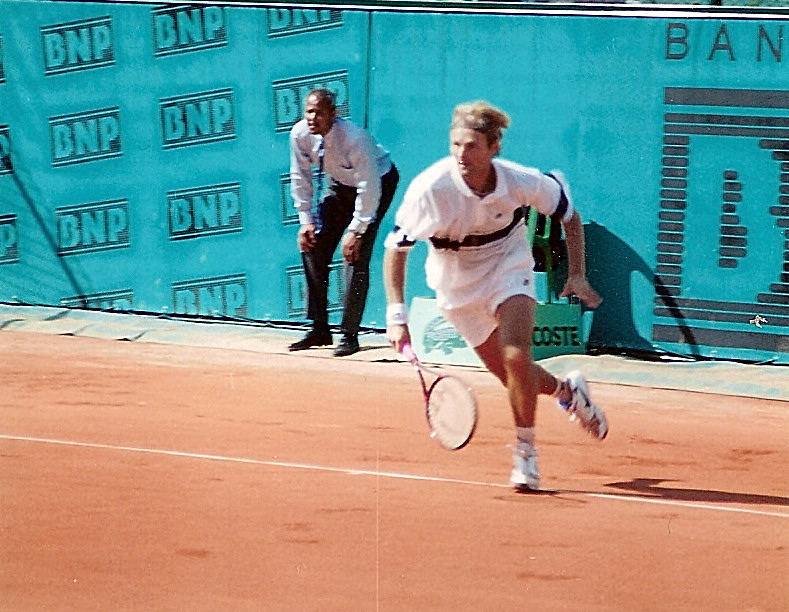
Thierry Champion

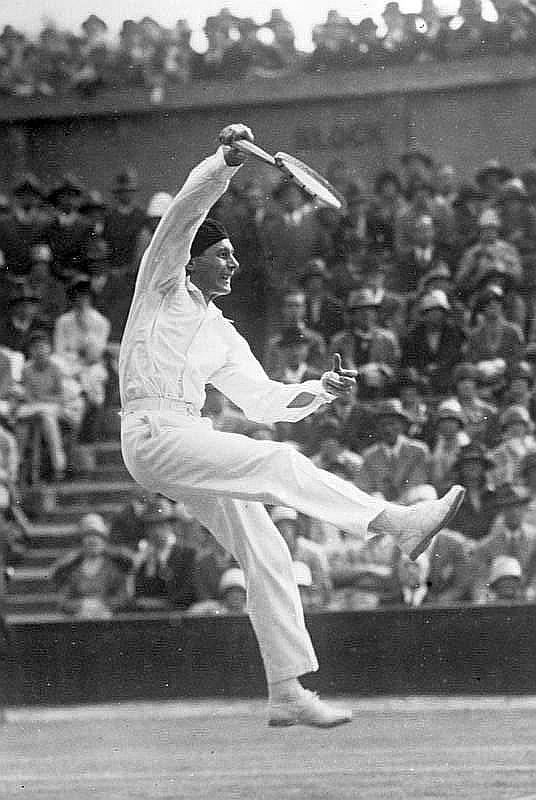
Jean Borotra

- Robert Abdesselam
- Paul Aymé
- Julien Benneteau
- Marcel Bernard
- Jean Borotra
- Christian Boussus
- Jacques Brugnon
- Albert Canet
- Thierry Champion
- Andrei Chesnokov
- Max Decugis
- Bernard Destremau
- Georges Gault
- Richard Gasquet
- Augustin Gensse
- Maurice Germot
- André Gobert
- Sébastien Grosjean
- Jérôme Haehnel
- Paul Lebreton
- Alexandre Sidorenko
- Jo-Wilfried Tsonga
- André Vacherot
- Michel Vacherot
- Stanislas Wawrinka
- Éric Winogradsky

=== Women ===
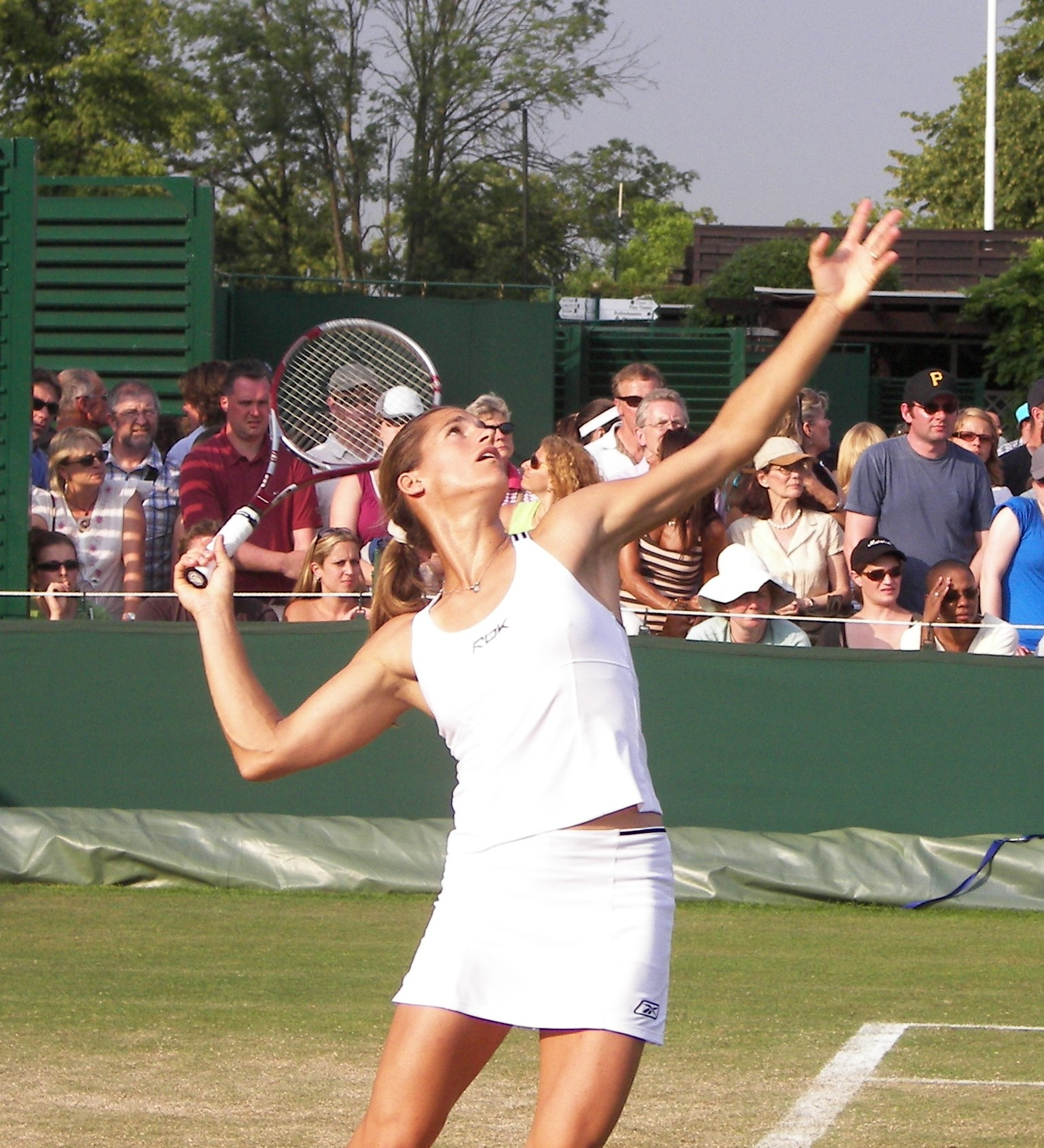
Amélie Mauresmo

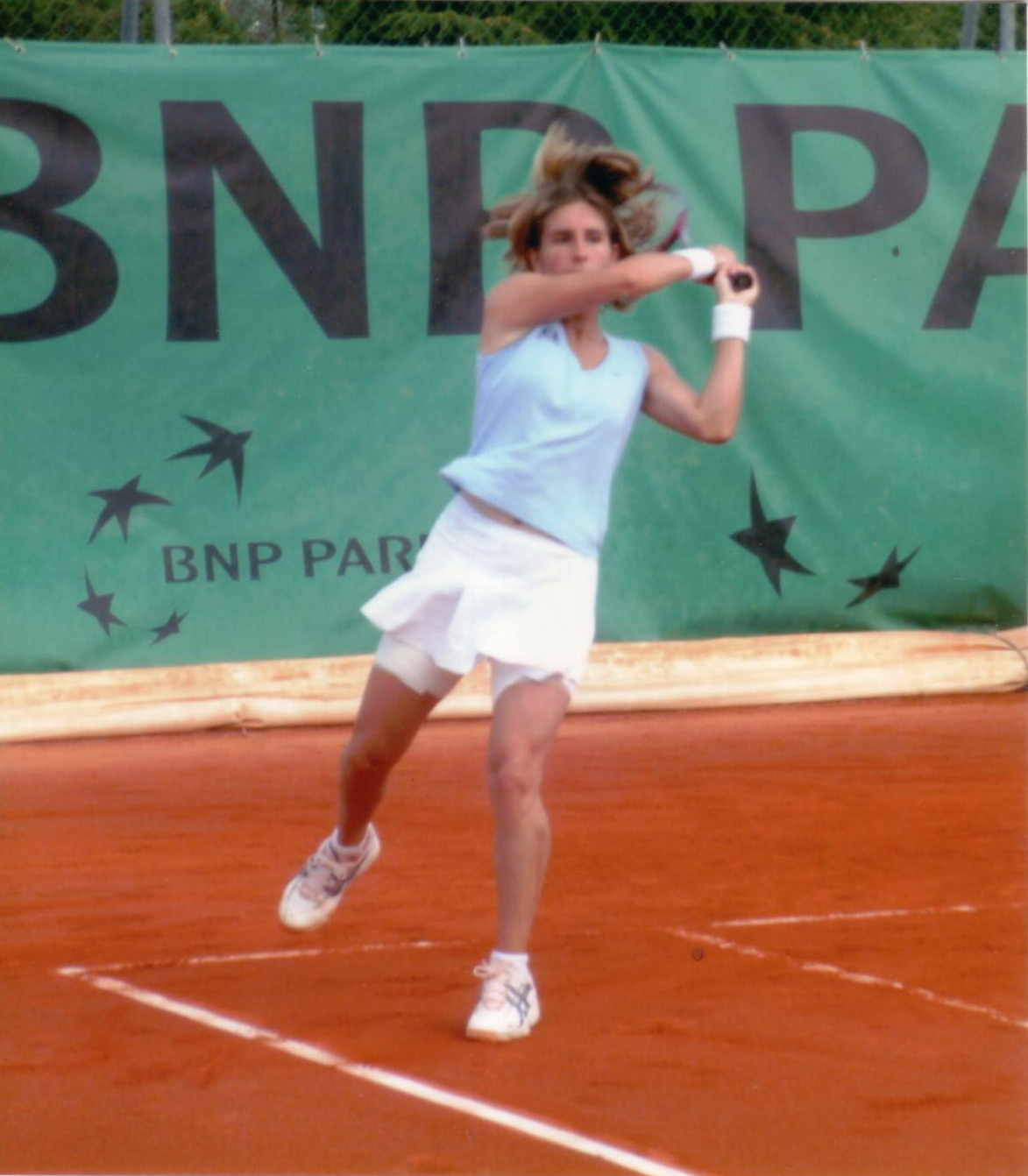
Émilie Loit

- Sophie Amiach
- Amélie Cocheteux
- Alexia Dechaume
- Stéphanie Foretz
- Nathalie Herreman
- Émilie Loit
- Amélie Mauresmo
- Pauline Parmentier
- Marie-Ève Pelletier
- Dally Randriantefy
- Olivia Sanchez
- Anne-Marie Seghers
- Anne-Gaëlle Sidot
- Sandrine Testud
- Nathalie Viérin
