= Middle States Championships =

Defunct tennis tournament
- Founded: 1885
- Abolished: 1977 (men); 2005 (women)
- Editions: 93 (men); 121 (women)
- Location: Hoboken (1885-88, 91); Philadelphia (1920-50,53,58,60-68); Rochester (1890); South Orange (1892, 96,99, 1900-1916, 1918-19); Mountain Station (1893-95,97); Staten island (1917)
- Surface: outdoor (grass)

The Middle States Championships, also known as the Middle States Sectional Championships or Championship of the Middle States, was a regional level tennis tournament held at various locations from 1885 to 1968.

== History ==
The spring Championship of the Middle States were first staged at the St George's Cricket Club, Hoboken, New Jersey on 10–12 June 1885. The first winner of the men's singles event was Richard D. Sears. The tournament was classified as a regional championship by the United States Lawn Tennis Association until 1900 when they started to be referred to as sectional championships (a geographic, competitive term, but nothing to do with how they are governed.

== Finals ==
=== Men's Singles ===
Year	Location	Winner	Runner-up	Score
↓ USNLTA Circuit ↓
1885	Hoboken	(United States) Richard Sears	(United States) Howard Taylor	6–4, 6–1, 6–3
1886	Hoboken	(United States) Robert Livingston Beeckman	(United Kingdom) William Edward Glyn	1–6, 8–6, 6–2, 6–8, 6–1
1887	Hoboken	(United States) Robert Livingston Beeckman (2)	(United States) Howard Taylor	6–3, 8–6, 6–4
1888	Hoboken	(United States) Edward Peale MacMullen	(United States) Robert Livingston Beeckman	6–0, 6–4, 0–6, 8–6
1889	Hoboken	(United States) Howard Taylor	(United States) Clarence Hobart	5–7, 6–2, 6–2, 4–6, 6–1
1890	Rochester	(United States) Howard Taylor (2)	(United States) Albert Empie Wright	5–7, 6–3, 6–3, 6–4
1891	Hoboken	(United States) Charles Edward Sands	(United States) Howard Taylor	w.o.
1892	South Orange	(United States) Richard W. Stevens	(United States) Charles Edward Sands	6–3, 6–3, 6–1
1893	Mountain Station	(United States) Richard W. Stevens (2)	(United States) Arthur Ellsworth Foote	6–3, 6–3, 6–2
1894	Mountain Station	(United States) Bill Larned	(United States) Richard W. Stevens (3)	6–4, 4–6, 6–2, 6–2
1895	Mountain Station	(United States) Bill Larned (2)	(United States) John Howland	15–13, 8–6, 6–4
1896	South Orange	(United States) Clarence Hobart	(United States) Bill Larned	w.o.
1897	Mountain Station	(United States) Bill Larned (3)	(United States) Clarence Hobart	w.o.
1899	South Orange	(United States) Bill Larned (4)	(United States) Malcolm Whitman	6–1, 4–6, 6–4, 6–2
1900	South Orange	(United States) Malcolm Whitman (2)	(United States) Dwight F. Davis	3–6, 6–3, 6–4, 6–3
1901	South Orange	(United States) Bill Larned (5)	(United States) Malcolm Whitman	w.o.
1902	South Orange	(United States) Holcombe Ward	(United States) Fred Larned	?
1903	South Orange	(United States) Stephen C. Millett	(United States) Holcombe Ward	?
1904	South Orange	(United States) Clarence Hobart (2)	(United States) Stephen C. Millett	6-2, 0-4, 7-5, 7-9, 7-5
1905	South Orange	(United States) Fred Alexander	(United States) Clarence Hobart	2-6, 4-6, 6-4, 6-3, 8-6
1906	South Orange	(United States) Bill Larned (6)	Fred Alexander	8-6, 7-5, 6-3
1907	South Orange	(United States) Bill Larned (7)	(United States) Raymond D. Little	3–6, 6–2, 6–2, 6–2
1908	South Orange	(United States) Edward Larned	(United States) Bill Larned	w.o.
1909	South Orange	(United States) Edward Larned (2)	(United States) Wallace F. Johnson	6–2, 6–4, 7–5
1911	South Orange	(United States) Walter Merrill Hall	(United States) Nathaniel Niles	6–8, 5–4, default
1918	South Orange	(United States) Walter Merrill Hall (2)	(United States) Roosevelt Pell	6–3, 6–2, 6–0
1919	South Orange	(United States) Walter Merrill Hall (3)	(United States) Leonard A. Beekman	4–6, 6–3, 6–2, 4–6, 6–2
1920	Philadelphia	(United States) Wallace F. Johnson	(United States) Kenneth D. Fisher	6–4, 6–3, 6–1
1921	Philadelphia	(United States) Carl Fischer	(United States) Philip Bovier Hawk	1–6, 6–4, 12–10, 0–6, 6–3
1922	Philadelphia	(United States) Carl Fischer (2)	(United States) ?	?
1923	Philadelphia	(United States) Wallace F. Johnson (2)	(United States) Carl Fischer	3–6, 6–3, 3–6, 6–2, 6–3
↓ ILTF Circuit ↓
1924	Philadelphia	(United States) Wallace F. Johnson (3)	(United States) Wallace Wendell Scott	?
1925	Philadelphia	(United States) Fritz Mercur	(United States) Edward M. Mann	7–5, 3–6, 8–6
1926	Philadelphia	(United States) Bill Tilden	(Spain) Manuel Alonso de Areyzaga	6–3, 6–4, 3–6, 6–4
1927	Philadelphia	(Spain) Manuel Alonso de Areyzaga	(United States) Cranston William Holman	7–5, 3–6, 6–3, 6–2
1935	Pittsburgh	(United States) Gilbert A. Hunt	(United States) Guy Cheng	6–8, 6–0, 7–5
1936	Pittsburgh	(United States) Barnie Walsh	(United States) Arthur Hendrix	3–6, 4–6, 8–6, 7–5, 6–1
1937	Philadelphia	(United States) Julius Heldman	(United States) Robert Harman	6–3, 6–2, 1–6, 2–6, 6–2
1939	Bethesda	(United States) Barnie Walsh (2)	(United States) Hugh J. Lynch	1–6, 6–1, 6–4, 6–3
1943	Philadelphia	(United States) James Brink	(United States) Gene Garrett	6–1, 6–1, 6–3
1945	Richmond	(United States) Jimmy Evert	(United States) Bren Macken	6–1, 6–0, 6–1

=== Women's Singles ===
Incomplete Roll

Year	Location	Winner	Runner-up	Score
↓ USNLTA Circuit ↓
1890	Rochester	(Ireland) Mabel Cahill	(United States) ?	?
1891	Hoboken	(Ireland) Mabel Cahill (2)	(United States) Emma Leavitt-Morgan	7–5, 7–5
1892	South Orange	(Ireland) Mabel Cahill (3)	(United States) Augusta Schultz	6–1, 6–1
1893	Mountain Station	(Ireland) Mabel Cahill (4)	(United States) Helena Hellwig	6–1, 6–1
1894	Mountain Station	(United States) Juliette Atkinson	(United States) Helena Hellwig	6–8, 6–4, 7–5, 8–10, 6–3
1896	South Orange	(United States) Elisabeth Moore	(United States) Juliette Atkinson	6–4, 4–6, 2–1, retired
1901	South Orange	(United States) Juliette Atkinson (2)	(United States) Margaret Johnson	6–1, 5–7, 6–8, 7–5, 6–3
1902	South Orange	(United States) Maud Banks	(United States) Marion Jones	6–2, 5–7, 6–3
1903	South Orange	(United States) Carrie Neely	(United States) Marion Jones	6–4, 2–6, 6–2
1904	South Orange	(United States) May Sutton	(United States) Carrie Neely	6–1, 6–1
1905	South Orange	(United States) Carrie Neely (2)	(United States) Alice Day	6–1, 6–2
1906	South Orange	(United States) Helen Homans	(United States) Alice Day	6–0, 6–2
1907	South Orange	(United States) Carrie Neely (3)	(United States) Marie Wagner	6–4, 6–3
1908	South Orange	(United States) Carrie Neely (4)	(United States) Marie Wagner	w.o.
1909	South Orange	(United States) Louise Hammond	(United States) Augusta Bradley Chapman	6–3, 6–4
1910	South Orange	(United States) Louise Hammond (2)	(United States) Carrie Neely	3–6, 6–1, 6–4
1911	South Orange	(United States) Hazel Hotchkiss	(United States) Louise Hammond Raymond	6–2, 6–2
1912	South Orange	(United States) Edythe Parker Beard	(United States) Polly Sheldon	5–7, 6–4, 6–2
1913	South Orange	(United States) Edith Rotch	(United States) Alice Day Beard	7–5, 6–1
1914	South Orange	(United States) Louise Hammond Raymond (3)	(United States) Edith Rotch	6–2 6–3
1915	South Orange	(Norway) Molla Bjurstedt	(United States) Ina Kissel	6–1, 6–3
1916	South Orange	(United States) Ina Kissel	(United States) Grace Moore LeRoy	4–6, 6–2, 6–1
1917	Staten Island	(United States) Patricia Butlin Hitchins	(United States) Helen Gilleaudeau	5–7, 6–4, 6–1
1918	South Orange	(United States) Adelaide Browning Green	(United States) Natalie Browning	6–2, 4–6, 6–0
1919	South Orange	(United States) Helene Pollak	(United States) Florence Ballin	6–1. 7–5
1920	Philadelphia	(United States) Ida Wilson Huff	(United States) Edith Kurtz Newhall	6–2, 6–3
1921	Philadelphia	(United States) Molla Bjurstedt Mallory (2)	(United States) Edith Sigourney	6–0, 6–3
1922	Philadelphia	(United States) Molla Bjurstedt Mallory (3)	(United States) Marion Zinderstein Jessup	6–1, 6–1
1923	Philadelphia	(United States) Eleanor Goss	(United States) Molla Bjurstedt Mallory	7–5 4–6 6–3
↓ ILTF Circuit ↓
1924	Philadelphia	(United States) Molla Bjurstedt Mallory (4)	(United States) Anne Townsend	6–1 6–0
1925	Philadelphia	(United States) Molla Bjurstedt Mallory (5)	(United States) Marion Zinderstein Jessup	6–3, 4–6, 6–2
1926	Philadelphia	(United States) Elizabeth Ryan	(United States) Hazel Hotchkiss Wightman	6–3, 6–2
1927	Philadelphia	(United States) Molla Bjurstedt Mallory (6)	(Netherlands) Kea Bouman	6–4, 6–4
1928	Philadelphia	(United States) Molla Bjurstedt Mallory (7)	(United States) Hazel Hotchkiss Wightman	6–3, 11–9
1929	Philadelphia	(United States) Virginia Hilleary	(United States) Sarah Neilson Madeira	3–6, 6–3, 6–3
1930	Philadelphia	(United States) Virginia Hilleary (2)	(United States) Dorothy Andrus	6–1, 6–4
1931	Philadelphia	(United Kingdom) Elsie Goldsack Pittman	(United Kingdom) Joan Ridley	6–4, 4–6, 6–2
1932	Philadelphia	(United Kingdom) Elsie Goldsack Pittman (2)	(United Kingdom) Joan Ridley	6–1, 6–2
1933	Philadelphia	(United Kingdom) Joan Ridley	(United States) Alice Francis	6–1, 6–2

== Sources ==
- Hall, Valentine Gill (1889). "Tournaments of 1885: Summary". Lawn tennis in America. Biographical sketches of all the prominent players ... knotty points, and all the latest rules and directions governing handicaps, umpires, and rules for playing. New York: New York, D. W. Granbery & co.
- Heathcote, John Moyer (1891). Tennis. London: Longmans, [Green,].
- Kimball, Warren F. (2017). "2: The Founding Gentlemen 1877-1913". The United States Tennis Association: Raising the Game. Lincoln, Nebraska: U of Nebraska Press.
- Nieuwland, Alex. "Tournament – Middle States Championships". www.tennisarchives.com. A. Nieuwland.
- Paret, Jahial Parmly; Allen, J. P.; Alexander, Frederick B.; Hardy, Samuel [from old catalog (1918). Spalding's tennis annual . New York: New York, American sports publishing company
