= Richard Stevens (tennis) =

American tennis player

- Country (sports): United States
- Turned pro: 1882 (amateur tour)
- Retired: 1916

Singles
- Career record: 107–55 (66.04%)
- Career titles: 5

Grand Slam singles results
- US Open: QF (1892, 1893, 1894, 1896, 1898, 1905)

Richard Stevens was an American tennis player active in the late 19th century and early 20th century, He was a six time singles quarter finalist at the U.S. National Championships. He was active from 1882 to 1916 and won 5 career singles title.

== Career ==
He played his first event in 1882 at the San Gabriel Tournament in San Gabriel, Palm Coast, Florida where he reached the final before losing tro Arthur Allen. Stevens reached the quarterfinals of the U.S. National Championships six times: in 1892, 1893, 1894, 1896, 1898 and 1905.

His other career singles highlights included winning the Seabright Invitational in 1892, the Westchester Invitation in 1892, the Middle States Championships two years in a row in 1892 and 1893, and the New Jersey State Championships in 1899. In addition he was also a two time finalist at the Longwood Bowl in 1893 and 1894, and a finalist at the Seabright Invitational in 1895. He played his final singles tournament 1916 U.S. National Championships.

== Singles performance timeline ==
Key
W	F	SF	QF	#R	RR	Q#	DNQ	A	NH

(W) winner; (F) finalist; (SF) semifinalist; (QF) quarterfinalist; (#R) rounds 4, 3, 2, 1; (RR) round-robin stage; (Q#) qualification round; (DNQ) did not qualify; (A) absent; (NH) not held; (SR) strike rate (events won / competed); (W–L) win–loss record.

Events with a challenge round: (W_{C}) won; (CR) lost the challenge round; (F_{A}) all comers' finalist

	1891	1892	1893	1894	1895	1896	1897	1898	1899	1900	1901	1902	1903	1904	1905	1906	1907	1908	1909	1910	1911	1912	1913	1914	1915	1916	SR	W–L	Win %
Grand Slam tournaments
French	Only for French club members																								NH	NH	0 / 0	–	–
Wimbledon	A	A	A	A	A	A	A	A	A	A	A	A	A	A	A	A	A	A	A	A	A	A	A	A	NH	NH	0 / 0	–	–
U.S.	2R	QF	QF	QF	A	QF	A	QF	3R	A	3R	3R	3R	4R	QF	A	A	5R	4R	A	1R	4R	2R	4R	2R	3R	0 / 20	37–20	64.9
Australian	Not held														A	A	A	A	A	A	A	A	A	A	A	NH	0 / 0	–	–
Win–loss	1–1	3–1	3–1	2–1		3–1		3–1	0–1		2–1	2–1	1–1	2–1	4–1			2–1	1–1		0–1	3–1	0–1	2–1	1–1	2–1	0 / 20	37–20	64.9
