= André Prévost =

André Prévost may refer to:

- André Prévost (tennis) (1860–1919), French tennis player
- André Prévost (composer) (1934–2001), Canadian composer and teacher
