= New Jersey State Championships =

Defunct tennis tournament
- Founded: 1882-1973
- Location: Various
- Surface: outdoor (grass), outdoor (clay)

The New Jersey State Championships also known as the New Jersey State Tennis Championships or New Jersey State Sectional Championships was a men's and women's tennis tournament first staged in 1882 in Newark, New Jersey USA. The tournament was played at various times on clay courts and grass courts, and ran until 1968 for women's events, and 1973 for men's events.

== History ==
The New Jersey State Championships, was a men's and women's tennis tournament first staged in 1882 in Newark, New Jersey USA. The first winner of the men's singles was American player Joseph Sill Clark. The first known women's singles event was staged in 1889 which was one by Gertrude Williams. The final men's singles winner was Peter Fleming in 1973. The final women's singles event winner was Pat Stewart in 1968. It was a featured regular series event on the Men's Amateur Tour (1876-1967) and the Women's Amateur Tour (1876-1967).

== Finals ==
Incomplete Roll

=== Men's Singles ===
Year	Location	Winner	Runner-up	Score
↓ USNLTA Circuit ↓
1882	Newark	(United States) Joseph Sill Clark	(United States) ?	?
1886	South Orange	(United States) Richard Field Conover	(United States) R.J. Halsey	6-3, 6–3, 6-0
1889	South Orange	(United States) Clarence Hobart	(United States) W.K. Fowler	6-0, 6–4, 6-4
1890	South Orange	(United States) Clarence Hobart (2)	(United States) Duncan William Candler	w.o.
1891	South Orange	(United States) Clarence Hobart (3)	(United States) Richard W. Stevens	?
1894	Ridgewood	(United States) Frederick Jessup	(United States) C.F. Walz	6-1, 6–2, 6-2
1895	Ridgewood	(United States) Frederick Jessup (2)	(United States) George H. Miles	2-6, 6–2, 4–6, 6–2, 6-3
1896	Ridgewood	(United States) Jahial Parmly Paret	(United States) Richard H. Palmer	6-2, 6–2, 6-1
1899	South Orange	(United States) Richard W. Stevens	(United States) Stephen Caldwell Millett	6-2, 4–6, 4–6, 7–5, 6-4
1900	South Orange	(United States) Eddie Hall	(United States) Richard W. Stevens	6-4, 6–3, 6–8, 6-2
1906	Morristown	(Canada) Frederick George Anderson	(United States) Theodore Pell	6-4 8-6 3-6 6-4
1907.	Morristown	(United States) Edward Penniman Larned	(United States) Theodore Pell	6-4 8-6 3-6 6-4
1908	Morristown	(United States) Richard H. Palmer	(United States) Edward Penniman Larned	w.o.
1919	Montclair	(United States) Harold Throckmorton	(United States) P.F. Ball	6-2, 6–0, 8–10, 3–6, 6-3
1920	Montclair	(United States) Harold Throckmorton (2)	(United States) Willard H. Botsford	6-2, 6–0, 8–10, 3–6, 6-3
1921	Montclair	(United States) Vanderbilt B. Ward	(United States) Edward J. Oelsner	6-3, 10–8, 6-2
1922	Montclair	(United States) Herbert Bowman	(Japan) Seiichiro Kashio	6-3, 10–8, 6-2
1923	Montclair	(United States) Anton Frederick Von Bernuth	(United States) Percy Lloyd Kynaston	?
1924	Montclair	(United States) Lindsay Dunham	(United States) Percy Lloyd Kynaston	1-6, 6–2, 6–3, 6-1
↓ ILTF Circuit ↓
1925	Montclair	(United States) Herbert Bowman (2)	(Spain) José María Alonso	6-3, 6–4, 7-5
1926	Montclair	(United States) Herbert Bowman (3)	(United States) Allen Hawthorne Behr	6-1, 6–1, 6-2
1927	Montclair	(United States) Herbert Bowman (4)	(United States) Fred C. Anderson	6-1, 6–3, 4–6, 4–6, 6-1
1928	Montclair	(United States) Wilmer Allison	(United States) Berkeley Bell	?
1929	Montclair	(United States) Gregory Mangin	(United States) Bruce Barnes	6-4, 4–6, 6–2, 6-3
1930	Montclair	(United States) Herbert Bowman (5)	(United States) Julius Seligson	5-7, 9–7, 5–7, 6–3, 8-6
1931	Montclair	(United States) Richard T. Murphy	(United States) David Jones	9-7, 7–5, 3–6, 3–6, 8-6
1932	Montclair	(United States) Richard T. Murphy (2)	(United States) David Jones	9-7, 7–5, 3–6, 3–6, 8-6
1933	Montclair	(United States) Gregory Mangin	(United States) Herbert Bowman	8-6, 6–4, 4–6, 6-3
1934	Montclair	(United States) Cliff Sutter	(United States) Gregory Mangin	8-6, 6–4, 6-0
1935	Montclair	(United States) Gregory Mangin	(United States) William (Bill) Lurie	6-2, 2–6, 7-,5 6-4
1936	Montclair	(United States) Frank Bowden	(United States) Leonard Hartman	6-3, 6–2, 6-3
1937	Montclair	(United States) Donald S. Hawley	(United States) Gerard Podesta	4-6, 7–5, 6–4, 3–6, 8-6
1938	Montclair	(United States) Donald S. Hawley (2)	(United States) Robert Peacock	6-4, 6–4, 6-4
1939	South Orange	(United States) Richard (Dick) McKee	(United States) William (Bill) McGehee	6-4, 6–1, 6-2
1940	South Orange	(United States) Elwood Thomas Cooke	(United States) Hal Surface	6-2, 7–5, 6-4
1941	South Orange	(United States) Frank Kovacs	(United States) Jack Kramer	1-6, 6–1, 6–3, 6-1
1942	South Orange	(Ecuador) Pancho Segura	(Czechoslovakia) Ladislav Hecht	6-0, 6–0, 6-0
1943	Elizabeth	(Ecuador) Pancho Segura (2)	(United States) Robert J. Odman	6-2, 7–5, 6-1
1944	South Orange	(United States) Jack McManis	(United States) Richard J. Bender	6-2, 6–2, 6-1
1946	South Orange	(United States) Ted Schroeder	(United States) Don McNeill	2-6, 3–6, 6–4, 6–2, 6-3
1947	South Orange	(United States) Dick Savitt	(Chile) Ricardo Balbiers	6-1, 6–2, 6-3
1948	West Orange	(United States) Pancho Gonzales	(United States) Don McNeill	6-3, 4–6, 2–6, 6–4, 6-0
1965	Kearney	(United States) Peter Fishbach	(United States) John Reese	6-4, 5–7, 6-2 3–6, 6-3
1966	East Orange	(United States) Frank Froehling	(United States) Robert Barker	6-2, 6-3
1968	Morristown	(United States) Jeff Miller	(United States) Cliff Montgomery	6-2, 6–3, 6-4
↓ Open era ↓
1970	Kearney	(United States) Steve Ross	(United States) Steve Siegel	6-4, 6–3, 0–6, 6-3
1971	Kearney	(United States) Steve Ross (2)	(United States) Bob Kahn	6-3, 6–0, 6-0
1972	Clifton	(United States) Steve Ross (3)	(United States) Andy Finn	3-6, 6–4, 6-2
1973	Arlington	(United States) Peter Fleming	(United States) Steve Ross	3-6, 6–4, 6-2

=== Women's Singles ===
Incomplete Roll

Year	Location	Winner	Runner-up	Score
↓ USNLTA Circuit ↓
1889	South Orange	(United States) Gertrude Williams	(United States) Lida Voorhees	6-4, 6-2
1890	South Orange	(Ireland) Mabel Cahill	(United States) Emma Leavitt-Morgan	6-3, 6-1
1896	Ridgewood	(United States) Elisabeth Moore	(United States) Lulu Mowry	6-4, 6–8, 6-1
1905	Morristown	(United States) Alice Day	(United States) Marion Behr	6-3, 6-4
1906	Morristown	(United States) Alice Day (2)	(United States) Edna Wildey	4-6, 6–4, 6-1
1907	Morristown	(United States) Elizabeth Moore (2)	(United States) Marie Wagner	4-6 6-2 6-4
1908	Morristown	(United States) Marie Wagner	(United States) Augusta Bradley Chapman	6-3, 6-1
1909	Morristown	(United States) Marie Wagner (2)	(United States) Helen Hellwig Pouch	6-2, 7-5
1910	Morristown	(United States) Marie Wagner (3)	(United States) Esther Smith	6–2, 6-1
1911	Morristown	(United States) Helen Homans McLean	(United States) Elizabeth C. Bunce	6–4, 6-2
1912	Morristown	(United States) Edythe Parker Beard	(United States) Miriam Steever	6–3, 6-2
1913	Morristown	(United States) Helen Homans McLean	(United States) Marie Wagner	6-4, 8-6
1914	Morristown	(United States) Anita Carrington	(United States) Laura Fischer Pope	6-1, 6-1
1915	Morristown	(United States) Helen Homans McLean (2)	(United States) Marie Wagner	6-1, 6-2
1918	South Orange	(Norway) Molla Bjurstedt	(United States) Marion Zinderstein	6-3, 6-2
1919	South Orange	(Norway) Molla Bjurstedt (2)	(United States) Florence Sheldon	6-1, 6-1
1920	South Orange	(United States) Florence Ballin	(United States) Mrs Rawson Wood	6-4, 7-5
1921	Englewood	(United States) Helene Pollak Falk	(United States) Patricia Butlin Hitchins	6-1, 6-4
1922	Englewood	(United States) Marion Chapman	(United States) Dorothy Walker Waring	6-2, 6-1
1923	South Orange	(United States) Lilian Scharman	(United States) Edna Hauselt	1-6, 6–2, 6-4
↓ ILTF Circuit ↓
1924	South Orange	(United States) Grace Moore Le Roy	(United States) Theodora Sohst	6-2, 6-4
1925	South Orange	(United States) Clare Cassell	(United States) Hildegarde Turle Taylor	6-1, 6-0
1926	Westfield	(United States) Gladys Taylor Hawk	(United States) Hazel Sawyer Wells	7-5, 6-2
1927	Westfield	(United States) Marjorie Morrill	(United States) Clara Greenspan	7-5, 11-9
1929	Westfield	(United States) Charlotte Miller	(United States) Mary Keller	6-4, 11-9
1930	Westfield	(United States) Norma Taubele	(United States) Alice Francis	6-3, 6-1
1931	Westfield	(United States) Alice Francis	(United States) Mrs Christian E. Muhl	6-4, 0–6, 6-2
1932	Hackensack	(United States) Maud Rosenbaum Levi	(United States) Grace Surber	6-2, 6-2
1933	Hackensack	(United States) Maud Rosenbaum Levi (2)	(United States) Grace Surber	6-4, 6-3
1934	Hackensack	(United States) Norma Taubele (2)	(United States) Grace Surber	6-3, 5–7, 6-1
1935	Hackensack	(United States) Maud Rosenbaum Levi (3)	(United States) Norma Taubele	4-6, 6-1 6-2
1936	Hackensack	(United States) Eunice Dean	(United States) Norma Taubele	6-4, 1–6, 6-2
1937	Hackensack	(United States) Eunice Dean (2)	(United States) Millicent Hirsch	3-6, 7–5, 6-3
1938	Hackensack	(United States) Helen Bernhard	(United States) Eunice Dean	6-0 3-3 (suspended)
1939	Hackensack	(United States) Norma Taubele (3)	(United States) Millicent Hirsch	6-2, 4–6, 6-2
1940	Hackensack	(United States) Millicent Hirsch	(United States) Norma Taubele	6-0, 6-1
1968	East Orange	(United States) Pat Stewart	(United States) Louise Gonnerman	12-10, 6-1
↓ Open era ↓

== Sources ==
- Player Profile: Richard Murphy". ATP Tour. ATP.
- Player Profile: William Lurie". ATP Tour. ATP.
- Player Profile: John Reese". ATP Tour. ATP.
- "The Cornell Daily Sun: Sport Page". cdsun-cornell.veridiansoftware.com. Cornell University Library. 28 October 1947.
- Sclar, Ari F. (15 April 2015). Beyond Stereotypes: American Jews and Sports. West Lafayette: Purdue University Press. ISBN 978-1-61249-356-5.
- Times, The New York (10 June 1926). "Feibleman Winner in Jersey Tennis; Reaches Round Before Semi-Finals in State Tourney by Defeating Dunham". The New York Times.
- Waldman, Frank (1949). Famous American Athletes of Today. Boston: L.C. Page.
- Wright & Ditson Officially Adopted Lawn Tennis Guide. New York: Wright & Ditson. 1908.
