= Tennis at the 1900 Summer Olympics – Men's singles =

Olympic tennis event

Men's singles tennis at the Games of the II Olympiad
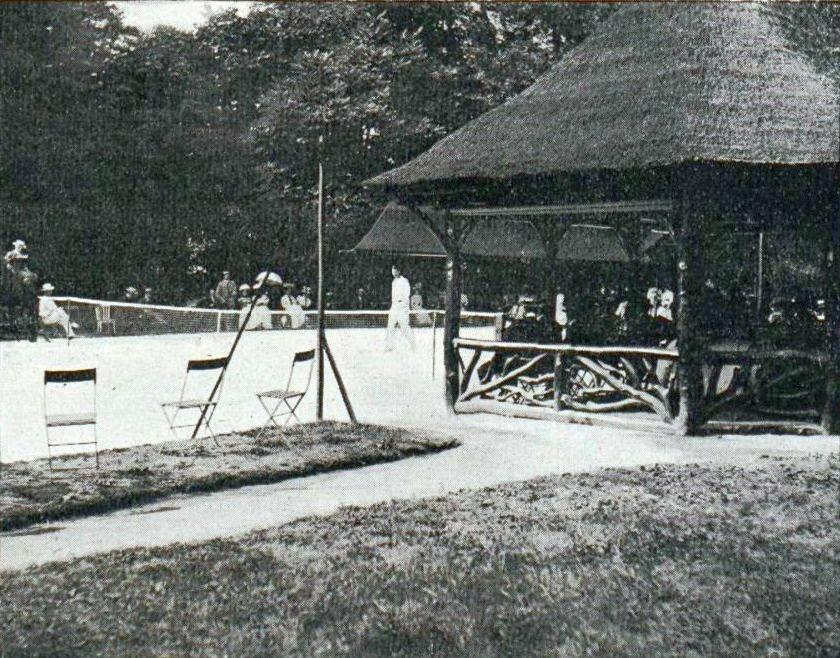
- Tennis at the 1900 Olympics
- Venue: Île de Puteaux
- Dates: 6–11 July 1900
- Competitors: 13 from 3 nations

Medalists
1st place, gold medalist(s)		Laurence Doherty; Great Britain
2nd place, silver medalist(s)		Harold Mahony; Great Britain
3rd place, bronze medalist(s)		Reginald Doherty; Great Britain
3rd place, bronze medalist(s)		Arthur Norris; Great Britain

Men's singles
- Tennis at the 1900 Summer Olympics

Events
Singles	men	women
Doubles	men		mixed
← 1896 ·	Summer Olympics	· 1904 →

The men's singles was an event on the tennis at the 1900 Summer Olympics program in Paris. It was held on 6 July and 11 July 1900. A total of 13 players from three nations competed, with two additional players withdrawing. This was the first time in Olympic history that Great Britain had a medal sweep in an event. Laurence Doherty took top honors, beating Harold Mahony in the final. Laurence's brother Reginald refused to play Laurence in the semifinals and forfeited; he and Arthur Norris are considered bronze medalists.

== Background ==
This was the second appearance of the men's singles tennis. The event has been held at every Summer Olympics where tennis has been on the program: from 1896 to 1924 and then from 1988 to the current program. Demonstration events were held in 1968 and 1984.

The Doherty brothers of Great Britain were heavily favored. Reginald Doherty had just won his fourth straight The Championships, Wimbledon singles title. Laurence Doherty would later win five (1902–1906). Their strongest competition was likely Harold Mahony, who had won Wimbledon in 1896 and the European championship in 1899. Max Decugis was the strongest non-British player (and would win 8 French championships after the Games), but he withdrew; André Prévost was the 1900 French runner-up.

The United States made its debut in the event. France and Great Britain both made their second appearance.

== Competition format ==
The competition was a single-elimination tournament with no bronze-medal match (both semifinal losers tied for third). All matches before the final were best-of-three sets; the final was best-of-five sets.

== Schedule ==
Date	Time	Round
Friday, 6 July 1900; Saturday, 7 July 1900; Sunday, 8 July 1900; Monday, 9 July 1900; Tuesday, 10 July 1900; Wednesday, 11 July 1900		Round 1 Quarterfinals; Semifinals; Final

== Draw ==
=== Key ===
- Q = Qualifier
- WC = Wild card
- LL = Lucky loser
- Alt = Alternate
- SE = Special exempt
- PR = Protected ranking
- ITF = ITF entry
- JE = Junior exempt
- w/o = Walkover
- r = Retired
- d = Defaulted
- SR = Special ranking

=== Finals ===
Quarterfinals
Harold Mahony (GBR)	6	6
Charles Sands (USA)	2	3
Arthur Norris (GBR)	6	6
André Prévost (FRA)	4	4
Archibald Warden (GBR)
Wylie Grant (USA)	w/o

Semifinals
Max Decugis (FRA)	w/o
Harold Mahony (GBR)
Arthur Norris (GBR)	6	6
Archibald Warden (GBR)	4	2

Final (gold-medal match)
Harold Mahony (GBR)	8	6
Arthur Norris (GBR)	6	1
Final (gold-medal match)
Laurence Doherty (GBR)	3
Reginald Doherty (GBR)	w/o

== Results summary ==
Rank	Player	Nation	Round of 16	Quarterfinals	Semifinals	Final
1st place, gold medalist(s)	Laurence Doherty	Great Britain	Lebréton (FRA); W 6–2, 6–3	de Garmendia (USA); W 6–2, 8–6	R Doherty (GBR); W w/o	Mahony (GBR); W 6–4, 6–2, 6–3
2nd place, silver medalist(s)	Harold Mahony	Great Britain	Sands (USA); W 6–2, 6–3	Decugis (FRA); W w/o	Norris (GBR); W 8–6, 6–1	L Doherty (GBR); L 6–4, 6–2, 6–3
3rd place, bronze medalist(s)	Reginald Doherty	Great Britain	Durand (FRA); W 6–2, 6–3	Lecaron (FRA); W 6–2, 6–1	L Doherty (GBR); L w/o	Did not advance
3rd place, bronze medalist(s)	Arthur Norris	Great Britain	Prévost (FRA); W 6–4, 6–4	Warden (GBR); W 6–4, 6–2	Mahony (GBR); L 8–6, 6–1	Did not advance
5	Basil Spalding de Garmendia	United States	Voigt (USA); W 6–1, 6–3	L Doherty (GBR); L 6–2, 8–6	did not advance	
5	Paul Lecaron	France	Lippmann (FRA); W 6–0, 6–1	R Doherty (GBR); L 6–2, 6–1	did not advance	
5	Archibald Warden	Great Britain	Grant (USA); W w/o	Norris (GBR); L 6–4, 6–2	did not advance	
8	Étienne Durand	France	R Doherty (GBR); L 6–2, 6–3	did not advance		
8	Pierre Lebréton	France	L Doherty (GBR); L 6–2, 6–3	did not advance		
8	Albert Lippmann	France	Lecaron (FRA); L 6–0, 6–1	did not advance		
8	André Prévost	France	Norris (GBR); L 6–4, 6–4	did not advance		
8	Charles Sands	United States	Mahony (GBR); L 6–2, 6–3	did not advance		
8	Charles Voigt	United States	Garmendia (USA); L 6–1, 6–3	did not advance		
—	Max Decugis	France	Bye	Mahony (GBR); L w/o	did not advance	
—	Wylie C. Grant	United States	Warden (GBR); L w/o	did not advance		
