= Richard Carleton (tennis) =

American tennis player (1875–1939)

- Full name: Richard Hugh Carleton
- Country (sports): United States
- Born: September 8, 1875 Illinois, United States
- Died: August 12, 1939 (aged 63) New Hampshire, United States
- Turned pro: 1894 (amateur tour)
- Retired: 1904

Singles

Grand Slam singles results
- US Open: SF (1903)

Richard Carleton (1875–1939) was an American tennis player. He excelled at tennis while at Harvard and played tennis at the Crescent Athletic Club. Carleton lost his first match at the U.S. Championships in 1896 to Edwin Fischer. In 1898 he lost in round two to Harold Hackett. Carleton reached the semi-finals of the U.S. Championships in 1903, and in beating Malcolm Whitman's younger brother was "steady and sure in the placing of his strokes." Carleton lost his semifinal to Laurence Doherty.
