= Reginald Doherty =

British tennis player

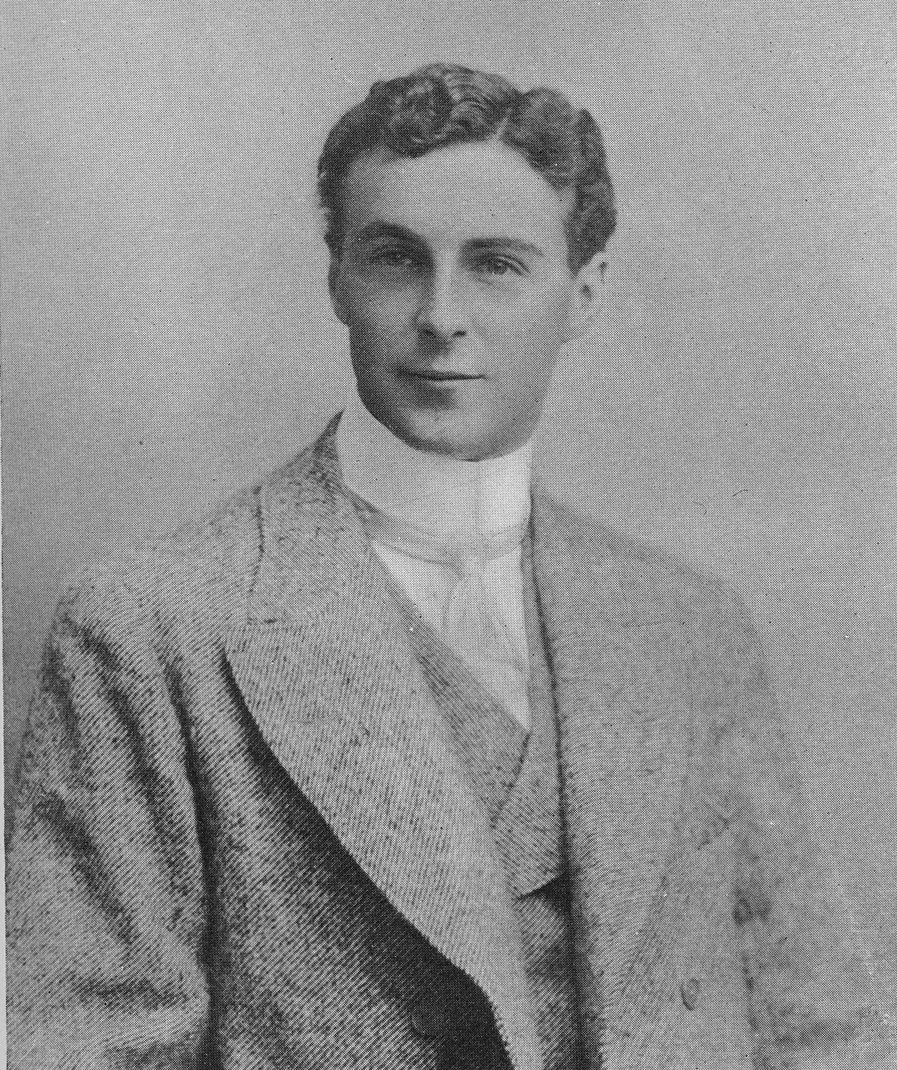
- Full name: Reginald Frank Doherty
- Country (sports): United Kingdom
- Born: 14 October 1872 Wimbledon, Surrey, England
- Died: 29 December 1910 (aged 38) Kensington, London, England
- Height: 1.85 m (6 ft 1 in)
- Turned pro: 1891 (amateur)
- Retired: 1910
- Plays: Right-handed (one-handed backhand)
- Int. Tennis HoF: 1980 (member page)

Singles
- Career record: 211–96
- Career titles: 36
- Highest ranking: No. 1 (1897, ITHF)

Grand Slam singles results
- Wimbledon: W (1897, 1898, 1899, 1900)
- US Open: F (1902^{Ch})

Grand Slam doubles results
- Wimbledon: W (1897, 1898, 1899, 1900, 1901, 1903, 1904, 1905)
- US Open: W (1902, 1903)

Team competitions
- Davis Cup: W (1903, 1904, 1905, 1906)
Medal record
Olympic Games – Tennis
| Gold medal – first place | 1900 Paris | Doubles |
| Gold medal – first place | 1900 Paris | Mixed doubles |
| Gold medal – first place | 1908 London | Doubles |
| Bronze medal – third place | 1900 Paris | Singles |

Reginald "Reggie" or "R. F." Frank Doherty (14 October 1872 – 29 December 1910) was a British tennis player and the older brother of tennis player Laurence Doherty. He was known in the tennis world as "R.F." rather than "Reggie". He was a four-time Wimbledon singles champion and a triple Olympic Gold medalist in doubles and mixed doubles.

== Early life ==
Doherty was born on 14 October 1872 at Beulah Villa in Wimbledon, the oldest son of William Doherty, a printer, and his wife Catherine Ann Davis. Doherty began tennis early in life and as a boy at Westminster School showed great promise. At age 14, he won the boys' singles title at an open championship in Llandudno. Doherty was educated at Trinity Hall, Cambridge, where he played for the Cambridge University Lawn Tennis Club. In 1895 and 1896, he was part of the Cambridge team that beat Oxford and won the Scottish and Essex championships.

== Career ==
Grand Slam tournaments

Doherty played in his first Wimbledon Championships in 1894 and lost in the first round to Clement Cazalet in four sets. In 1897 Doherty won his first singles Wimbledon title after beating reigning champion Harold Mahony in three straight sets (6–4, 6–4, 6–3). He successfully defended his title for the next three years (1898, 1899, 1900). In 1898 he did so by beating his brother in the Challenge Round in five sets. In 1901 he finally lost his Wimbledon crown when he was defeated in the Challenge Round by Arthur Gore in four sets). He was also a runner-up at the US Championships in 1902 where he was beaten by the defending American champion William Larned in four sets. Together with his brother Laurie he won eight Wimbledon Championships doubles titles and two US Championship doubles titles.

Davis Cup

Doherty represented the British Isles in the prestigious Davis Cup contest from 1902 to 1906. In 1902 he won the doubles match with his brother but lost the final and decisive singles match against American Malcolm Whitman in straight sets. In 1903 he contributed significantly to his team's first Davis Cup title against the United States by winning the doubles match and the decisive singles match against Robert Wrenn. Doherty won the Davis Cup trophy a further three times (1904, 1905, 1906) although in these years he only competed, and won, in the doubles matches.

Olympics

Doherty won the doubles title (gold medals were not given at the 1900 Games) at the 1900 Olympic Games in Paris with his brother. He also competed in the singles tournament and reached the semifinal, where he was scheduled to play against his brother. Reggie withdrew, since the brothers refused to play each other before the final. He also won the mixed doubles title with five-time Wimbledon champion Charlotte Cooper. Doherty did not compete in the 1904 Olympics in St. Louis. In the 1908 Olympics in London, Reggie again won the doubles title, this time with compatriot George Hillyard.

R.F. Doherty was inducted into the International Tennis Hall of Fame in 1980 together with his brother.

== Death ==
Doherty died of heart failure and neurasthenia on 29 December 1910 at age 38 at his home in Kensington, a day after returning from a convalescence stay in a sanatorium in Davos, Switzerland.

According to his obituary in The New York Times, Doherty had "been in ill health for some time". The article further stated he "held at various times every important championship the world of tennis has for a man to win. He was not beaten until he began to fail in health". Both brothers apparently had respiratory problems throughout their lives.

R.F. and his brother had been urged to take up lawn tennis by their father, reportedly for health reasons.

== Grand Slam finals ==
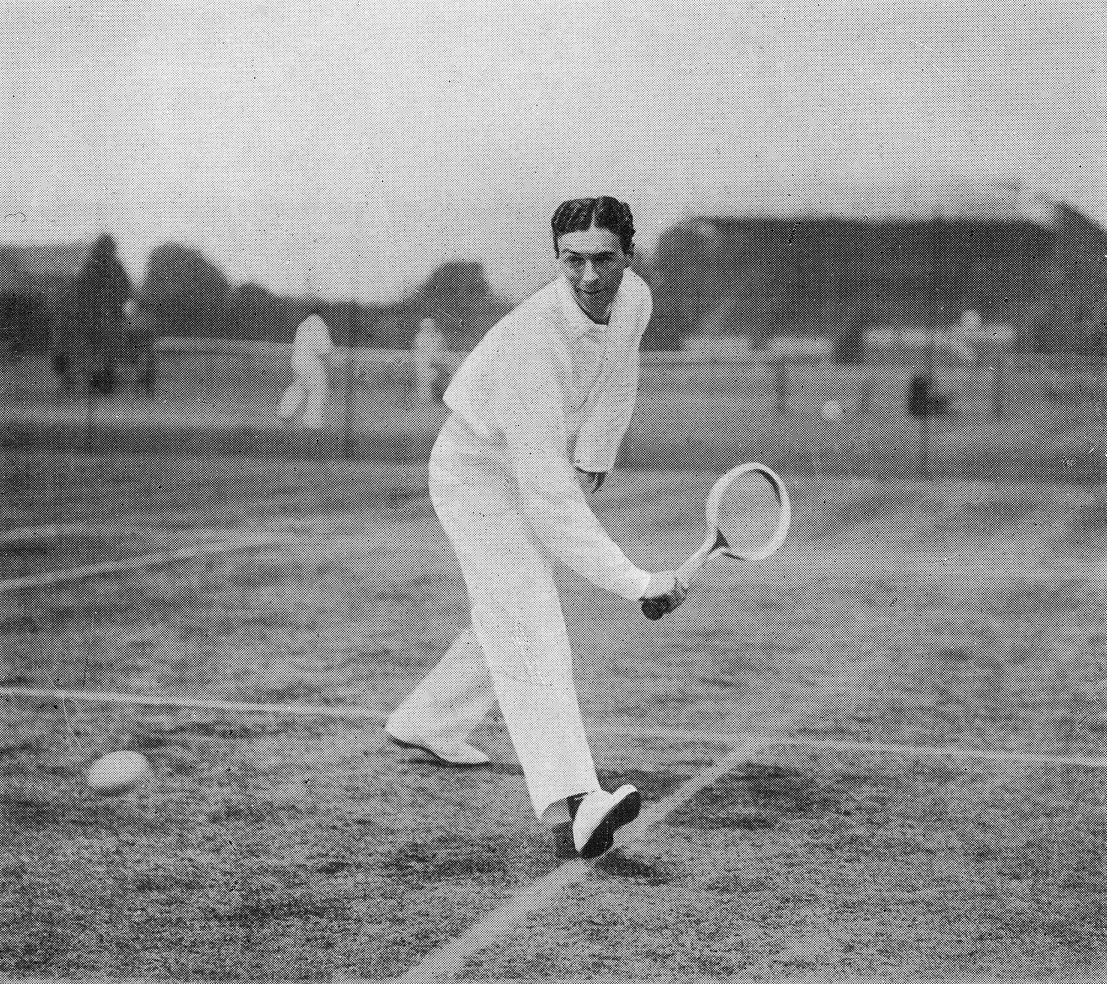
Reginald Doherty – Beginning of a low backhand drive

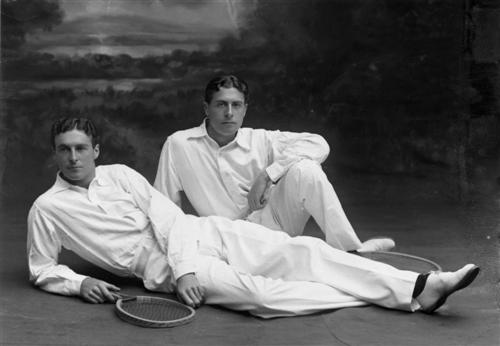
Reginald Doherty (left) with his brother Laurence.

=== Singles: 6 (4 titles, 2 runners-up) ===
| Result | Year | Championship | Surface | Opponent | Score |
|---|---|---|---|---|---|
| Win | 1897 | Wimbledon | Grass | (United Kingdom of Great Britain and Ireland) Harold Mahony | 6–4, 6–4, 6–3 |
| Win | 1898 | Wimbledon | Grass | (United Kingdom of Great Britain and Ireland) Laurence Doherty | 6–3, 6–3, 2–6, 5–7, 6–1 |
| Win | 1899 | Wimbledon | Grass | (United Kingdom of Great Britain and Ireland) Arthur Gore | 1–6, 4–6, 6–3, 6–3, 6–3 |
| Win | 1900 | Wimbledon | Grass | (United Kingdom of Great Britain and Ireland) Sydney Smith | 6–8, 6–3, 6–1, 5–7, 11–9 |
| Loss | 1901 | Wimbledon | Grass | (United Kingdom of Great Britain and Ireland) Arthur Gore | 6–4, 5–7, 4–6, 4–6 |
| Loss | 1902 | U.S. National Championships | Grass | (United States) William Larned | 6–4, 2–6, 4–6, 6–8 |

=== Doubles: 13 (10 titles, 3 runners-up) ===
| Result | Year | Championship | Surface | Partner | Opponents | Score |
|---|---|---|---|---|---|---|
| Loss | 1896 | Wimbledon | Grass | (United Kingdom of Great Britain and Ireland) Harold Nisbet | (United Kingdom of Great Britain and Ireland) Herbert Baddeley (United Kingdom of Great Britain and Ireland) Wilfred Baddeley | 6–1, 6–3, 4–6, 2–6, 1–6 |
| Win | 1897 | Wimbledon | Grass | (United Kingdom of Great Britain and Ireland) Laurence Doherty | (United Kingdom of Great Britain and Ireland) Herbert Baddeley (United Kingdom of Great Britain and Ireland) Wilfred Baddeley | 6–4, 4–6, 8–6, 6–4 |
| Win | 1898 | Wimbledon | Grass | (United Kingdom of Great Britain and Ireland) Laurence Doherty | (United States) Clarence Hobart (United Kingdom of Great Britain and Ireland) Harold Nisbet | 6–4, 6–4, 6–2 |
| Win | 1899 | Wimbledon | Grass | (United Kingdom of Great Britain and Ireland) Laurence Doherty | (United States) Clarence Hobart (United Kingdom of Great Britain and Ireland) Harold Nisbet | 7–5, 6–0, 6–2 |
| Win | 1900 | Wimbledon | Grass | (United Kingdom of Great Britain and Ireland) Laurence Doherty | (United Kingdom of Great Britain and Ireland) Herbert Roper Barrett (United Kingdom of Great Britain and Ireland) Harold Nisbet | 9–7, 7–5, 4–6, 3–6, 6–3 |
| Win | 1901 | Wimbledon | Grass | (United Kingdom of Great Britain and Ireland) Laurence Doherty | (United States) Dwight Davis (United States) Holcombe Ward | 4–6, 6–2, 6–3, 9–7 |
| Loss | 1902 | Wimbledon | Grass | (United Kingdom of Great Britain and Ireland) Laurence Doherty | (United Kingdom of Great Britain and Ireland) Frank Riseley (United Kingdom of Great Britain and Ireland) Sydney Smith | 6–4, 6–8, 3–6, 6–4, 9–11 |
| Win | 1902 | U.S. National Championships | Grass | (United Kingdom of Great Britain and Ireland) Laurence Doherty | (United States) Dwight Davis (United States) Holcombe Ward | 11–9, 12–10, 6–4 |
| Win | 1903 | Wimbledon | Grass | (United Kingdom of Great Britain and Ireland) Laurence Doherty | (United Kingdom of Great Britain and Ireland) Frank Riseley (United Kingdom of Great Britain and Ireland) Sydney Smith | 6–4, 6–4, 6–4 |
| Win | 1903 | U.S. National Championships | Grass | (United Kingdom of Great Britain and Ireland) Laurence Doherty | (United States) Kreigh Collins (United States) L. Harry Waidner | 7–5, 6–3, 6–3 |
| Win | 1904 | Wimbledon | Grass | (United Kingdom of Great Britain and Ireland) Laurence Doherty | (United Kingdom of Great Britain and Ireland) Frank Riseley (United Kingdom of Great Britain and Ireland) Sydney Smith | 6–1, 6–2, 6–4 |
| Win | 1905 | Wimbledon | Grass | (United Kingdom of Great Britain and Ireland) Laurence Doherty | (United Kingdom of Great Britain and Ireland) Frank Riseley (United Kingdom of Great Britain and Ireland) Sydney Smith | 6–2, 6–4, 6–8, 6–3 |
| Loss | 1906 | Wimbledon | Grass | (United Kingdom of Great Britain and Ireland) Laurence Doherty | (United Kingdom of Great Britain and Ireland) Frank Riseley (United Kingdom of Great Britain and Ireland) Sydney Smith | 8–6, 4–6, 7–5, 3–6, 3–6 |

== Career finals ==
Titles by surface
Clay (18–4)
Grass (14–12)
Hard (1–0)
Wood (3–0)

=== Singles titles (36) ===
| No. | Date | Tournament | Surface | Opponent | Score |
|---|---|---|---|---|---|
| 1. | 1895 | Essex Championships, Colchester, England | Grass | (England) Herbert Ramon Yglesias | 6–3, 6–1, 6–0 |
| 2. | 1895 | Scottish Championships, Moffat, Scotland | Grass | (Scotland) Richard Millar Watson | walkover |
| 3. | 1895 | Welsh Covered Court Championships, Llandudno, Wales | Wood | (Wales) William S. N. Heard | walkover |
| 4. | 1895 | Exmouth LTC Tournament, Exmouth, England | Grass | (United Kingdom) Harry S. Barlow | 6–1, 7–5, 6–2 |
| 5. | 1896 | Baden Baden International, Baden-Baden, Germany | Clay | (Germany) Count Voss | 6–1, 7–5, 6–2 |
| 6. | 1896 | East of England Championships, England | Grass | (United Kingdom) Edward Roy Allen | 6–4, 8–6 |
| 7. | 1896 | Essex Championships, Colchester, England | Grass | (England) Laurence Doherty | walkover |
| 8. | 1896 | Scottish Championships, Moffat, Scotland | Grass | (United Kingdom) Edward Roy Allen | 13–11, 6–4 retired. |
| 9. | 1896 | The Homburg Cup, Bad Homburg vor der Höhe, Germany | Clay | (United Kingdom) William M. Cranston | walkover |
| 10. | 1896 | Welsh Covered Court Championships, Llandudno, Wales | Wood | (England) Laurence Doherty | walkover |
| 11. | 1897 | Baden Baden International, Baden-Baden, Germany | Clay | (United Kingdom) Laurence Doherty | walkover |
| 12. | 1897 | Wimbledon Championships, London, England | Grass | (United Kingdom) Wilberforce Eaves | 6–3, 7–5, 2–0 ret |
| 13. | 1897 | South of France Championships, Nice, France | Clay | (Germany) Count Voss | 6–2, 6–4, 3–6, 6–1 |
| 14. | 1897 | The Homburg Cup, Bad Homburg vor der Höhe, Germany | Clay | (United Kingdom) George Hillyard | walkover |
| 15. | 1897 | Monte-Carlo Cup, Monte Carlo, France | Clay | (United Kingdom) Conway W. Blackwood Price | 6–2, 6–1, 6–2 |
| 16. | 1897 | Scottish Championships, Moffat, Scotland | Grass | (England) Laurence Doherty | walkover |
| 17. | 1897 | Cannes Championships, Cannes, France | Clay | (France) M.G. Gongoltz | 6–2, 6–4, 6–3 |
| 18. | 1897 | Welsh Covered Court Championships, Llandudno, Wales | Wood | (England) Laurence Doherty | walkover |
| 19. | 1898 | Wimbledon Championships, London, England | Grass | (England) Laurence Doherty | 6–3, 6–3, 2–6, 5–7, 6–1 |
| 20. | 1898 | The Homburg Cup, Bad Homburg vor der Höhe, Germany | Clay | (England) Laurence Doherty | walkover |
| 21. | 1898 | Monte-Carlo Cup, Monte Carlo, France | Clay | (Germany) Count Voss | 4–6, 6–3, 6–3, 4–0 Retired. |
| 22. | 1899 | Irish Championships Dublin, Ireland | Grass | (Ireland) Harold Mahony | 6–3, 6–4, 5–7, 6–4 |
| 23. | 1899 | Wimbledon Championships London, England | Grass | (United Kingdom) Arthur Gore | 1–6, 4–6, 6–3, 6–3, 6–3 |
| 24. | 1899 | Monte-Carlo Cup, Monte Carlo, France | Clay | (Germany) Count Voss | 6–2 Ret. |
| 25. | 1899 | Heiligendammer Cup, Heiligendammer, Germany | Clay | (Germany) Georg Wantzelius | 6–2, 6–1, 6–2 |
| 26. | 1899 | The Homburg Cup, Bad Homburg vor der Höhe, Germany | Clay | (United States) Clarence Hobart | 3–6, 4–6, 6–0, 6–3, 6–4 |
| 27. | 1899 | South of France Championships, Nice, France | Clay | (Germany) Count Voss | 6–0, 6–0 6–0 |
| 28. | 1900 | Irish Championships Dublin, Ireland | Grass | (England) Arthur Gore | 6–4, 7–5, 7–9, 7–9, 6–3 |
| 29. | 1900 | Wimbledon Championships London, England | Grass | (United Kingdom) Sydney Howard Smith | 6–8, 6–3, 6–1, 6–2 |
| 30. | 1901 | Irish Championships Dublin, Ireland | Grass | (England) Laurence Doherty | 6–4, 4–6 ret. |
| 31. | 1902 | Monte-Carlo Cup, Monte Carlo, France | Clay | (United Kingdom) George Hillyard | 6–1, 6–4, 6–3 |
| 32. | 1902 | Paris International Championships, Paris, France | Clay | (France) Paul Lebreton | walkover |
| 33. | 1903 | Monte-Carlo Cup, Monte Carlo, France | Clay | (United Kingdom) Frank Riseley | 6–1, 14–16 Ret. |
| 34. | 1903 | Paris International Championships, Paris, France | Clay | (France) Max Decugis | 6–4, 6–3, 8–6 |
| 35. | 1904 | Monte-Carlo Cup, Monte Carlo, France | Clay | (United Kingdom) Josiah Ritchie | 6–1, 7–5, 3–6, 7–5 |
| 36. | 1909 | South African Championships, Johannesburg, South Africa | Hard | (United Kingdom) Lionel Escombe | 6–3, 6–1, 6–1 |

=== Singles runners-up (16) ===
| No. | Date | Tournament | Surface | Opponent | Score |
|---|---|---|---|---|---|
| 1. | 1895 | Colchester Championship, Colchester, England | Grass | (England) Charles Allen | walkover |
| 2. | 1896 | Irish Championships, Dublin, Ireland | Grass | (Ireland) Harold Mahony | 6–2, 6–2, 6–4 |
| 3. | 1896 | Queen's Club Championships, London, England | Grass | (Ireland) Harold Mahony | 11–9, 6–4, 6–4 |
| 4. | 1896 | Sussex Championships, Exmouth, England | Grass | (England) Wilfred Baddeley | 6–1, 6–2, 6–3 |
| 5. | 1897 | Irish Championships, Dublin, Ireland | Grass | (England) Wilberforce Eaves | 6–4, 6–3, 3–6, 6–2 |
| 6. | 1897 | Northern Lawn Tennis Association Tournament, Manchester, England | Grass | (England) Wilfred Baddeley | 6–2, 7–5, 2–6, 6–0 |
| 7. | 1898 | South of France Championships, Nice, France | Clay | (England) Laurence Doherty | walkover |
| 8. | 1898 | Irish Championships, Dublin, Ireland | Grass | (Ireland) Harold Mahony | 6–3, 8–6, 6–3 |
| 9. | 1898 | Scottish Championships, Moffat, Scotland | Grass | (England) Laurence Doherty | walkover |
| 10. | 1899 | Championship of Europe, Bad Homburg, Germany | Clay | (Ireland) Harold Mahony | walkover |
| 11. | 1900 | South of France Championships, Nice, France | Clay | (England) Laurence Doherty | walkover |
| 12. | 1901 | Wimbledon Championships, London, England | Grass | (England) Arthur Gore | 4–6, 7–5, 6–4, 6–4 |
| 13. | 1902 | U.S. National Championships, Newport, RI, USA | Grass | (United States) William Larned | 4–6, 6–2, 6–4, 8–6 |
| 14 | 1902 | South of France Championships, Nice, France | Clay | (England) Laurence Doherty | walkover |
| 15. | 1902 | Irish Championships, Dublin, Ireland | Grass | (England) Laurence Doherty | walkover |
| 16 | 1905 | East Grinstead Open, East Grinstead, England | Grass | (United Kingdom) Roderick James McNair | walkover |
