= Charles Voigt =

American tennis player

Charles Adolph Voigt
- Born: May 2, 1869; San Jose, California, United States
- Died: July 3, 1929 (aged 60); London, England

Charles Adolph Voigt (May 2, 1869 – July 3, 1929) was an American tennis player. He competed in the men's singles event at the 1900 Summer Olympics.
