= 1902 U.S. National Championships – Men's singles =

Men's singles
- 1902 U.S. National Championships

Final
- Champion: (United States) William Larned
- Runner-up: (United Kingdom) Reginald Doherty
- Score: 4–6, 6–2, 6–4, 8–6

Events
Singles	men	women
Doubles	men	women
- U.S. National Championships

Defending champion William Larned defeated Reginald Doherty in the Challenge Round, 4–6, 6–2, 6–4, 8–6 to win the men's singles tennis title at the 1902 U.S. National Championships. The event was held at the Newport Casino in Newport, R.I., United States. Doherty had defeated Malcolm Whitman in the All Comers' Final.

== Draw ==
=== Challenge round ===
Challenge Round
(United States) William Larned	4	6	6	8
(United Kingdom) Reginald Doherty	6	2	4	6

=== All Comers' finals ===
Quarterfinals
(United States) Bob Huntington	8	6	6
(United States) Raymond Little	6	2	2
(United States) Kreigh Collins	0	1	4
(United States) Malcolm Whitman	6	6	6
(United Kingdom) Laurence Doherty	6	6	6
(United States) Leo Ware	3	2	2
(United Kingdom) Reginald Doherty	w/o
(United States) Harry Waidner

Semifinals
(United States) Bob Huntington	8	6	1	2
(United States) Malcolm Whitman	10	4	6	6
(United Kingdom) Laurence Doherty
(United Kingdom) Reginald Doherty	w/o

Finals
(United States) Malcolm Whitman	1	6	3	0
(United Kingdom) Reginald Doherty	6	3	6	6

=== Earlier rounds ===
==== Section 1 ====
First round

Second round
(United States) B Huntington	w/o
(United States) P. O'Connor
(United States) B Hoffman	w/o
FC Mahoney
(United States) S Waller	6	6	6
(United States) H Oelrichs	1	1	0
(United States) CE Sands	7	4	2	1
(United States) D Davis	5	6	6	6

Third round
(United States) B Huntington	6	6	6
(United States) B Hoffman	1	1	1
(United States) S Waller	w/o
(United States) D Davis

Fourth round
(United States) B Huntington	6	6	6
(United States) S Waller	0	4	3

==== Section 2 ====
First round

Second round
(United States) RD Little	3	6	6	6
(United States) A Codman	6	2	1	3
(United States) RF Manning
(United States) PP Sharples	w/o
(United States) AC McMaster	6	6	6
(United States) JF Brice	0	2	1
(United States) H Avery	6	6	6
(United States) C Biddle	2	2	4

Third round
(United States) RD Little	6	6	7
(United States) PP Sharples	4	0	5
(United States) AC McMaster	6	2	3	5
(United States) H Avery	2	6	6	7

Fourth round
(United States) RD Little	6	6	6
(United States) H Avery	4	4	4

==== Section 3 ====
First round
(United States) R Hunt	w/o
(United States) CF Watson Jr.
(United States) SC Williams	6	6	6
TE Watson	0	0	1

Second round
HH Whitman	w/o
FJ Otis
L De Forrest	w/o
(United States) D Miller
(United Kingdom) BG Franckenstein	0	1	0
(United States) K Collins	6	6	6
(United States) R Hunt	9	6	6
(United States) SC Williams	7	3	3

Third round
HH Whitman	w/o
L De Forrest
(United States) K Collins	8	6	4	6	6
(United States) R Hunt	6	4	6	8	1

Fourth round
HH Whitman	2	3
(United States) K Collins	6	6

==== Section 4 ====
First round
G La Dunn	6	6	6
WE Brice	4	1	0
(United States) P Knapp	1	6	6	6
BM Grant	6	2	2	0
(United States) MD Whitman	6	6	6
FR Smith	0	1	0
(United States) JS Seabury	w/o
(United States) IC Wright
(United States) HW Warner	6	6	6
(United States) B Wood	0	0	0
(United States) TR Pell	6	6	6
R Lyons	0	2	2
(United States) BC Wright	6	6	6
JH Ballinger	1	1	2
(United States) J Parmly Paret	6	6	6
I Lyons	2	0	1

Second round
G La Dunn	0	4	3
(United States) P Knapp	6	6	6
(United States) MD Whitman	6	6	6
(United States) JS Seabury	0	1	0
(United States) HW Warner	6	4	0	6	6
(United States) TR Pell	3	6	6	3	4
(United States) BC Wright	6	6	6
(United States) J Parmly Paret	3	4	2

Third round
(United States) P Knapp	0	1	1
(United States) MD Whitman	6	6	6
(United States) HW Warner	2	0	1
(United States) BC Wright	6	6	6

Fourth round
(United States) MD Whitman	6	4	6	7
(United States) BC Wright	3	6	3	5

==== Section 5 ====
First round
(United States) H Masson	w/o
A De Navarro
(United States) R Stevens	6	6	6
WH Bates	0	0	1
(United Kingdom) L Doherty	6	6	6
(United States) L Hoyt	1	1	1
(United States) C Hobart	w/o
(United States) J Talmage
(United States) DF Appleton	6	6	8
(United States) G McFadden	1	1	6
(United States) J Willis	6	6	6
(United States) CH Hatch	1	1	0
(United States) CR Budlong	w/o
W McKribben
(United States) HF Allen	3	4	6	7	6
(United States) RC Seaver	6	6	2	5	4

Second round
(United States) H Masson	0	0	2
(United States) R Stevens	6	6	6
(United Kingdom) L Doherty	6	6	7
(United States) C Hobart	3	3	5
(United States) DF Appleton	6	6	6
(United States) J Willis	4	3	4
(United States) CR Budlong	6	0	3
(United States) HF Allen	8	6	6

Third round
(United States) R Stevens	1	6	6	1
(United Kingdom) L Doherty	6	4	8	6
(United States) DF Appleton	0	6	1
(United States) HF Allen	6	8	6

Fourth round
(United Kingdom) L Doherty	6	6	6
(United States) HF Allen	0	2	0

==== Section 6 ====
First round
(United States) LE Ware	6	6	6
(United States) J Neely	1	3	4

Second round
(United States) LE Ware	6	6	6
(United States) A Heaton	1	3	2
(United States) RR Fischer	0	0	1
(United States) CS Lee	6	6	6
(United States) H Plummer	1	3	6
(United Kingdom) J Pim	6	6	8
SC Whipple	6	6	3	6
HR Sedgwick	2	2	6	1

Third round
(United States) LE Ware	6	6	6
(United States) CS Lee	0	1	0
(United Kingdom) J Pim	6	6	6
SC Whipple	0	0	4

Fourth round
(United States) LE Ware	7	7	6
(United Kingdom) J Pim	5	5	3

==== Section 7 ====
First round

Second round
(United States) JC Davidson	0	2	0
(United Kingdom) R Doherty	6	6	6
RB Cutting	3	5	3
(United States) LE Mahan	6	7	6
J Walker	6	6	6
WW Hoffman	1	1	0
(United States) TH Behr	2	2	2
(United States) W Clothier	6	6	6

Third round
(United Kingdom) R Doherty	6	6	6
(United States) LE Mahan	2	0	4
J Walker
(United States) W Clothier	w/o

Fourth round
(United Kingdom) R Doherty	3	7	6	6
(United States) W Clothier	6	5	4	2

==== Section 8 ====
First round

Second round
LW Glazebrook	6	7	6
(United States) A Stillman	2	5	3
(United States) H Ward	w/o
(United States) WA Warnock
(United States) EW Leonard	6	8	6
(United States) WL Foulke	0	6	3
(United States) G Herrick
(United States) LH Waidner	w/o

Third round
LW Glazebrook	w/o
(United States) H Ward
(United States) EW Leonard	7	6	2	6	4
(United States) LH Waidner	5	3	6	8	6

Fourth round
LW Glazebrook	1	2	2
(United States) LH Waidner	6	6	6

Preceded by 1902 Wimbledon Championships – Men's singles	Grand Slam men's singles	Succeeded by 1902 Wimbledon Championships – Men's singles
