= Tennis at the 1900 Summer Olympics – Men's doubles =

1900 Olympic tennis tournament

Men's doubles tennis at the Games of the II Olympiad
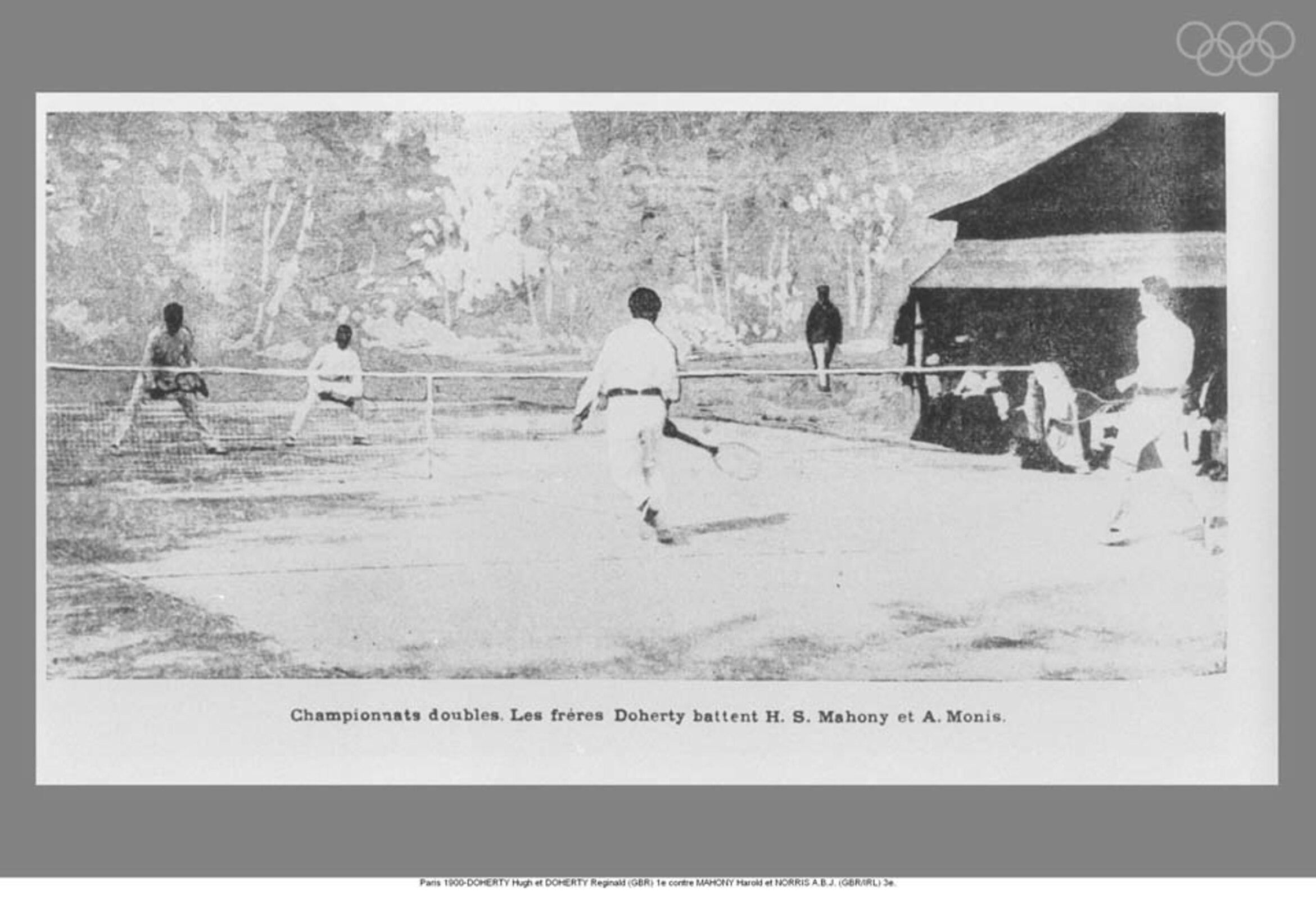
- Semifinal match between the Doherty brothers and Mahony/Norris
- Venue: Ile de Puteaux
- Dates: 6–11 July 1900
- Competitors: 8 teams (16 players) from 3 nations

Medalists
1st place, gold medalist(s)		Great Britain: Laurence Doherty; Reginald Doherty
2nd place, silver medalist(s)		Mixed team: Max Décugis; Basil Spalding de Garmendia
3rd place, bronze medalist(s)		France: Guy de la Chapelle; André Prévost
3rd place, bronze medalist(s)		Great Britain: Harold Mahony; Arthur Norris

Men's doubles
- Tennis at the 1900 Summer Olympics

Events
Singles	men	women
Doubles	men		mixed
← 1896 ·	Summer Olympics	· 1904 →

The men's doubles was an event on the tennis at the 1900 Summer Olympics program in Paris from 6 to 11 July. Sixteen players from 3 nations competed as eight pairs, including two mixed teams. The event was won by brothers Laurence Doherty and Reginald Doherty, defeating Max Décugis of France and Basil Spalding de Garmendia of the United States in the final. With no bronze-medal match, bronzes went to two teams: the French pair of Guy de la Chapelle and André Prévost and the British pair of Harold Mahony
Arthur Norris.

== Background ==
This was the second appearance of the men's doubles tennis. The event has been held at every Summer Olympics where tennis has been on the program: from 1896 to 1924 and then from 1988 to the current program. A demonstration event was held in 1968.

The Doherty brothers of Great Britain were heavily favored. Reginald Doherty had just won his fourth straight The Championships, Wimbledon singles title. Laurence Doherty would later win five (1902–1906). There were some significant other players, including Max Decugis (who would win 8 French championships after the Games) and Harold Mahony (who had won Wimbledon in 1896 and the European championship in 1899), but none of the pairs opposing the Doherty brothers were considered to have a chance.

The United States and France each made their debut in the event. Great Britain made its second appearance.

== Competition format ==
The competition was a single-elimination tournament with no bronze-medal match (both semifinal losers tied for third). All matches before the final were best-of-three sets; the final was best-of-five sets. Tiebreaks had not been invented yet.

== Schedule ==
Date	Time	Round
Friday, 6 July 1900; Saturday, 7 July 1900; Sunday, 8 July 1900; Monday, 9 July 1900; Tuesday, 10 July 1900; Wednesday, 11 July 1900		Quarterfinals; Semifinals; Final

== Draw ==
=== Key ===
- Q = Qualifier
- WC = Wild card
- LL = Lucky loser
- Alt = Alternate
- SE = Special exempt
- PR = Protected ranking
- ITF = ITF entry
- JE = Junior exempt
- w/o = Walkover
- r = Retired
- d = Defaulted
- SR = Special ranking

=== Draw ===
Quarterfinals
Max Decugis (FRA); Basil de Garmendia (USA)	6	7
Charles Sands (USA); Archibald Warden (GBR)	3	5
Guy de la Chapelle (FRA); André Prévost (FRA)	6	7	6
Elie de Lastours (FRA); Guy Lejeune (FRA)	3	9	2
Harold Mahony (GBR); Arthur Norris (GBR)	6	6	6
Étienne Durand (FRA); Adrien Fauchier-Magnan (FRA)	8	1	3
Laurence Doherty (GBR); Reginald Doherty (GBR)	6	6
Pierre Lebréton (FRA); Paul Lecaron (FRA)	2	3

Semifinals
Max Decugis (FRA); Basil de Garmendia (USA)	6	6
Guy de la Chapelle (FRA); André Prévost (FRA)	2	4
Harold Mahony (GBR); Arthur Norris (GBR)	4	1
Laurence Doherty (GBR); Reginald Doherty (GBR)	6	6

Final (gold-medal match)
Max Decugis (FRA); Basil de Garmendia (USA)	1	1	0
Laurence Doherty (GBR); Reginald Doherty (GBR)	6	6	6

== Results summary ==
Rank	Players	Nation	Quarterfinals	Semifinals	Final
1st place, gold medalist(s)	Laurence Doherty; Reginald Doherty	Great Britain	P Lebréton (FRA); P Lecaron (FRA); W 6–2, 6–3	H Mahony (GBR); A Norris (GBR); W 6–4, 6–1	M Decugis (FRA); B Spalding de Garmendia (USA); W 6–1, 6–1, 6–0
2nd place, silver medalist(s)	Max Decugis; Basil Spalding de Garmendia	Mixed team	C Sands (USA); A Warden (GBR); W 6–3, 7–5	G de la Chapelle (FRA); A Prévost (FRA); W 6–2, 6–4	L Doherty (GBR); R Doherty (GBR); L 6–1, 6–1, 6–0
3rd place, bronze medalist(s)	Guy de la Chapelle; André Prévost	France	E de Lastours (FRA); G Lejeune (FRA); W 6–3, 7–9, 6–2	M Decugis (FRA); B Spalding de Garmendia (USA); L 6–2, 6–4	Did not advance
3rd place, bronze medalist(s)	Harold Mahony; Arthur Norris	Great Britain	É Durand (FRA); A Fauchier-Magnan (FRA); W 6–8, 6–1, 6–3	L Doherty (GBR); R Doherty (GBR); L 6–4, 6–1	Did not advance
5	Étienne Durand; Adrien Fauchier-Magnan	France	H Mahony (GBR); A Norris (GBR); L 6–8, 6–1, 6–3	did not advance	
5	Élie, Count de Lastours; Guy Lejeune	France	G de la Chapelle (FRA); A Prévost (FRA); L 6–3, 7–9, 6–2	did not advance	
5	Pierre Lebréton; Paul Lecaron	France	L Doherty (GBR); R Doherty (GBR); L 6–2, 6–3	did not advance	
5	Charles Sands; Archibald Warden	Mixed team	M Decugis (FRA); B Spalding de Garmendia (USA); L 6–3, 7–5	did not advance	
