= Seabright Lawn Tennis and Cricket Club =

- U.S. National Register of Historic Places
- U.S. National Historic Landmark
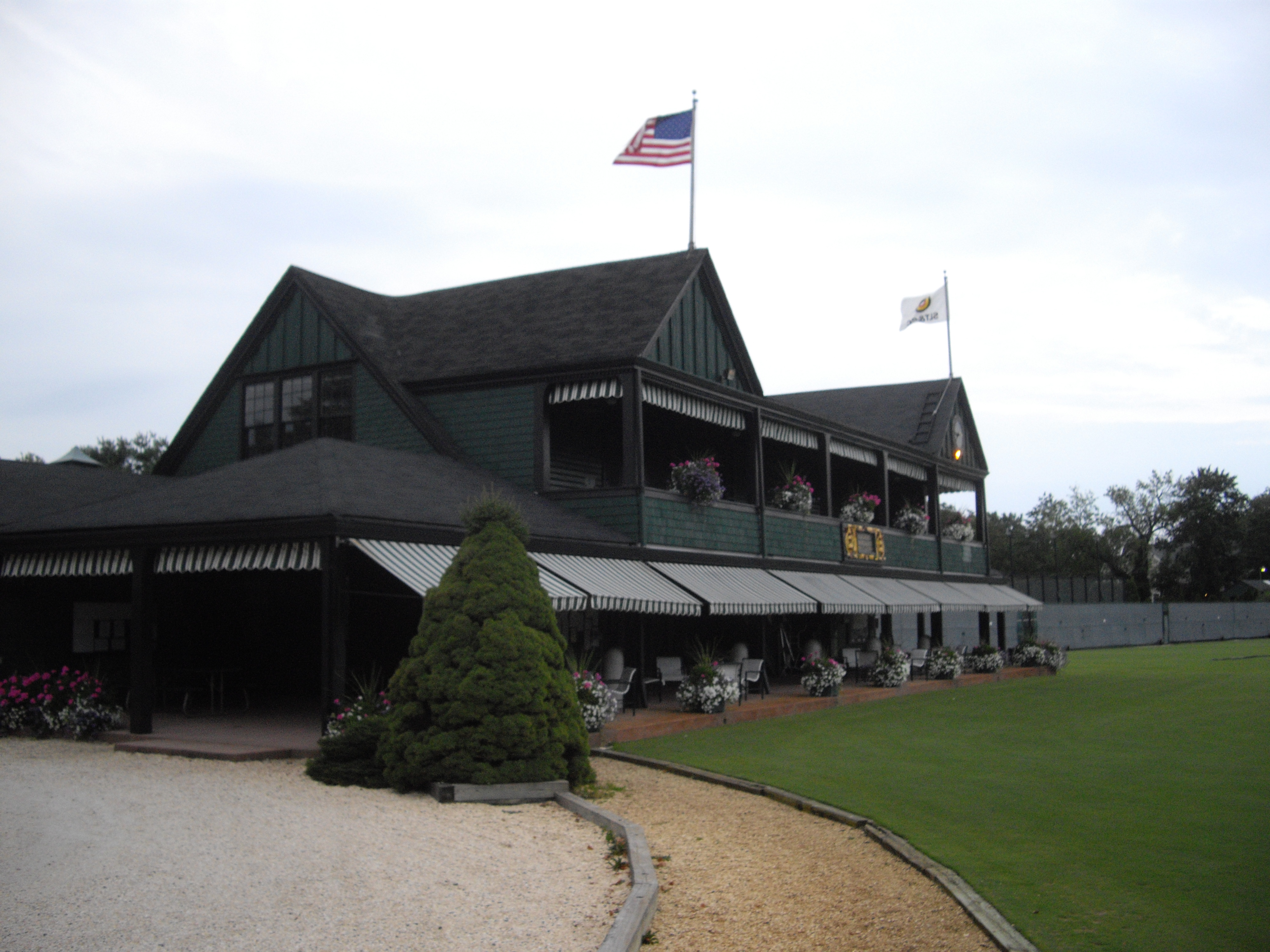

- Location within Monmouth County, New Jersey Location within New Jersey Location within the United States
- Location: 5 Tennis Court Lane, Rumson, New Jersey
- Coordinates: 40°21′59.3″N 73°59′0.8″W
- Area: 6.6 acres (2.7 ha)
- Built: 1877
- Architect: Renwick, Aspinwall & Russell; Withers, Creighton
- Architectural style: Shingle Style, Tudor Revival
- NRHP reference No.: 91000883

Significant dates
- Added to NRHP: July 9, 1991
- Designated NHL: October 5, 1992

The Seabright Lawn Tennis and Cricket Club is a historic private sports club in Rumson, Monmouth County, New Jersey, United States. Founded in 1877 and incorporated in 1886, it is one of the oldest active tennis clubs and claims to be the oldest lawn tennis club in the United States. Most of the club's present facilities were designated a National Historic Landmark in 1992 in recognition of this history.

== Description ==
The Seabright Lawn Tennis and Cricket Club is located in eastern Rumson, on more than 6 acres (2.4 ha) of land at the junction of Rumson Road and Tennis Court Lane. The clubhouse is located near the northern end of the property, with much of the property given over to tennis courts. The clubhouse was built in 1886 to a design by Renwick, Aspinwall and Russell, and is a Tudor Revival example of a 19th-century casino, or gathering place for entertainment and socialization.

The tennis facilities are divided into five groups. Three bands of lawn tennis courts are laid out south of the clubhouse, with a fourth band of hard-surface courts between those and Rumson Road. To the east of these are a fifth group of clay courts. A single court is located just northwest of the clubhouse at the northern edge of the property.

== History ==
The first documented instance of lawn tennis to be played in the United States took place in 1874 on Staten Island. In the wake of this event, several clubs dedicated to the sport were organized. Seabright's exact date of organization is uncertain: it claims a date 1876, but contemporaries have claimed 1877 as the founding date of Seabright and other early tennis clubs. Although it originally also included cricket and archery, interest in those sports waned, and the club's cricket pitch was converted into tennis courts in 1890. The club's historic interest in archery is marked by its logo, which resembles a bullseye.

The Seabright Invitational Tournament was a major tennis competition held from 1884 through 1950. It was ended not because of funding, but because the members grew tired of the fuss of organizing the event.
