= Étienne Durand =

French tennis player

- Full name: Étienne Durand

Étienne Durand was a French tennis player. He competed in the men's singles and doubles events at the 1900 Summer Olympics.
