= Seabright Invitational Tournament =

Defunct tennis tournament
- Tour: ILTF World Circuit
- Founded: 1884; 142 years ago
- Abolished: 1950; 76 years ago
- Location: Rumson, New Jersey, United States
- Venue: Seabright Lawn Tennis and Cricket Club
- Surface: Grass

The Seabright Invitational Tournament also known as the Seabright Invitation was a men's and women's grass court tennis tournament staged annually at the Seabright Lawn Tennis and Cricket Club, Rumson, New Jersey, United States from 1884 to 1950.

== History ==
The Seabright Lawn Tennis and Cricket Club is a historic private sports club in Rumson, Monmouth County, New Jersey in the United States. It was founded in 1877 and incorporated officially in 1886. In 1884, the club held its first Seabright Invitational Tournament, the men's singles was won Joseph Sill Clark Sr. The tournament continued to be staged annually until 1889 when it was discontinued.

In 1894 the tournament was reestablished, and in 1920 a permanent women's event was finally added to the schedule. The event was suspended from 1943 to 1945 because of World War II. It resumed in 1946 and continued to be held until 1949. In 1950, the organizing committee of Seabright Lawn Tennis and Cricket Club voted to discontinue the event, due to ongoing cost of the maintenance of the grass courts, and the budget needed to build new permanent spectator seating made it untenable. Contrary to official sources the other reason the tournament was ended was not because of funding, but because the members grew tired of the fuss of organizing the event.

== Finals ==
=== Men's singles ===
(Incomplete roll)

Year	Winners	Runners-up	Score
1886	(United States) H.W. Bucknall	(United States) Richard Stevens	6–2, 6–1, 6–1.
1888	(United States) H. Alexander	(United States) W. Ward	6–2, 6–4.
1891	(United States) Richard Stevens	(United States) A.W. Post	2–6, 1–6, 6–0, 6–3, 6–2
1892	(United States) Richard Stevens (2)	(United States) S.M. Allen	6–2, 6–1, 6–1.
1893	(United States) Bill Larned	(United States) Richard Stevens	walkover
1895	(United States) Bill Larned (2)	(United States) John Howland	7–5, 4–6, 6–1, 6–2.
1919	(United States) Bill Larned (3)	(United States) Leonard Beekman	6–3, 3–6, 6–2, 6–1.
1920	(United States) Watson Washburn	(United States) Willis Davis	1–6, 6–4, 6–3, 6–3.
1921	(United States) Bill Johnston	(United States) Dick Williams	6–0, 6–4, 6–2.
1922	(United States) Bill Johnston (2)	(United States) Dick Williams	6–0, 6–2, 6–3.
1923	(United States) Bill Johnston (3)	(United States) Dick Williams	?
1924	(United States) Howard Kinsey	(United States) Bill Johnston	?
1925	(United States) Vinnie Richards	(United States) James Anderson	6–1, 4–6, 6–0, 6–0.
1926	(United States) Vinnie Richards (2)	(Spain) Manuel Alonso Areizaga	6–2, 10–8.
1927	(United States) Bill Tilden II	(United States) Francis Hunter	6–4, 6–1, 8–6.
1928	(United States) John Van Ryn	(United States) Wilmer Allison	6–8, 6–1, 6–4, 4–6, 10–10, ret.
1929	(United States) John Doeg	(United States) Dick Williams	6–3, 7–5, 8–6.
1930	(United States) Sidney Wood	(United States) Ellsworth Vines	6–2, 6–2, 6–0.
1931	(United States) Ellsworth Vines	(United States) John Doeg	10–12, 6–8, 6–3, 8–6, 6–1.
1932	(United States) Sidney Wood (2)	(United States) Gregory Mangin	1–6, 6–2, 6–2, 6–4
1933	(United States) Frank Shields	(United States) Gregory Mangin	6–1, 6–3, 6–1
1934	(United States) Berkeley Bell	(United States) Bryan Grant	5–7 6–1 6–3 2–6 6–4.
1935	(United States) Gregory Mangin	(United States) Wilmer Hines	6–8, 6–4, 3–6, 6–2, 7–5.
1936	(United States) John McDiarmid	(United States) Joe Hunt	9–7, 6–2, 6–2.
1937	(United States) Bobby Riggs	(United States) Wilmer Allison	w.o.
1938	(United States) Bobby Riggs (2)	(United States) Elwood Thomas Cooke	6–1, 6–3, 6–1.
1939	(United States) Frank Parker	(United States) Don McNeill	6–3, 8–6, 6–0.
1940	(United States) Bobby Riggs (3)	(United States) Frank Kovacs	2–6, 0–6, 6–3, 11–9, 10–8.
1941	(United States) Bobby Riggs (4)	(United States) Ted Schroeder	6–4, 6–4, 6–0.
1942/1943	Not held (due to World War I)		
1945	(United States) Bill Talbert	(United States) Gardnar Mulloy	6–2, 3–6, 6–2, 6–4.
1946	(United States) Jack Kramer	(United States) Gardnar Mulloy	6–4, 6–4, 6–4.
1947	(United States) Gardnar Mulloy	(United States) Frank Parker	w.o.
1948	(United States) Earl Cochell	(United States) Bill Talbert	9–7, 8–6, 6–4.
1949	(United States) Earl Cochell (2)	(Italy) Gianni Cucelli	6–2, 2–6, 6–0, 6–1.

=== Women's singles ===
(Incomplete roll)

Year	Winners	Runners-up	Score
1888	(United States) Miss Clarkson	(United States) B. Lockwood	6–2, 6–0.
1917	(United States) Mary Browne	(United States) Miss Grundy	6–4, 1–6, 6–2.
1920	(United States) Marion Zinderstein	(United States) Eleanor Tennant	6–4, 6–2
1921	(United States) Molla Bjurstedt Mallory	(United States) Eleanor Goss	8–6, 6–3
1922	(United States) Molla Bjurstedt Mallory (2)	(United States) Leslie Bancroft	6–1, 6–2
1923	(United States) Molla Bjurstedt Mallory (3)	(United Kingdom) Mabel Davy Clayton	6–2, 6–3
1924	(United States) Mary Browne (2)	(United States) Mayme McDonald	6–0, 6–1
1925	(United States) Elizabeth Ryan	(United States) Helen Wills	6–3, 6–3
1926	(United States) Elizabeth Ryan (2)	(United States) Helen Wills	6–4, 6–1
1927	(United States) Molla Bjurstedt Mallory (4)	(United States) Helen Jacobs	6–2, 1–6, 6–1
1928	(United States) Helen Jacobs	(United States) Marjorie Gladman	9–7, 6–3
1929	(United States) Helen Jacobs (2)	(United States) Edith Cross	6–1, 6–2
1930	(United States) Anna McCune Harper	(United States) Josephine Cruickshank	6–4, 6–4
1931	(United States) Helen Wills-Moody	(United States) Helen Jacobs	6–0, 6–0
1932	(United States) Helen Jacobs (3)	(United States) Josephine Cruickshank	6–4, 6–3
1933	(United States) Sarah Palfrey	(United States) Helen Jacobs	6–1, 2–6, 7–5
1934	(United States) Carolin Babcock	(United States) Helen Jacobs	6–4, 6–2
1935	(United States) Ethel Burkhardt Arnold	(United States) Gracyn Wheeler	6–1, 6–0
1936	(United States) Alice Marble	(United States) Carolin Babcock	6–0, 6–3
1937	(United States) Alice Marble (2)	(Poland) Jadwiga Jędrzejowska	6–3, 5–7, 8–6
1938	(United States) Alice Marble (3)	(United States) Dorothy Bundy	6–2, 6–2
1939	(United States) Helen Bernhard	(United States) Dorothy Workman	6–3, 7–5
1940	(United States) Alice Marble (4)	(United Kingdom) Mary Hardwick	6–2, 6–0
1941	(United States) Sarah Palfrey Cooke (2)	(United States) Helen Bernhard	6–,8 6–2, 7–5
1942/1943	Not held (due to World War I)		
1944	(United States) Pauline Betz	(United States) Margaret Osborne	6–2, 2–6, 6–3
1945	(United States) Pauline Betz (2)	(United States) Louise Brough	10–8, 6–3
1946	(United States) Shirley Fry	(United States) Mary Arnold Prentiss	6–4, 3–6, 6–2
1947	(United States) Dorothy Head	(United States) Shirley Fry	7–5 6–4
1948	(United States) Gussie Moran	(United States) Louise Snow Isaacs	6–2, 6–2

== Other tournaments ==
The club during the 1880s early 1890s also organised other tournaments usually as a one off events occasionally a couple of editions.
