= San Gabriel Tournament =

Defunct tennis tournament
- Founded: 1882; 143 years ago
- Abolished: 1882; 143 years ago
- Location: San Gabriel, Palm Coast, Florida, United States
- Venue: San Gabriel Lawn Tennis Club
- Surface: Hard

The San Gabriel Tournament was an American late 19th century men's hard court tennis tournament first staged only one time at San Gabriel, Palm Coast, Florida, United States in June 1882.

== History ==
The San Gabriel Tournament was a late 19th century tennis men's tennis tournament staged only one known time at San Gabriel, Florida, USA in June 1882. The winner of the men's singles was American player Arthur Allen who defeated Richard Stevens in the final.

== Finals ==
=== Men's Singles ===
Year	Winner	Runner-up	Score
1882	(United States) Arthur Allen	(United States) Richard Stevens	4–6, 6–3, 6–4, 7–5
