= Basil Spalding de Garmendia =

American tennis player

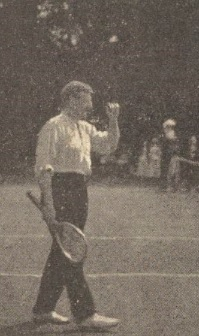
- Country (sports): United States
- Born: February 28, 1860 Baltimore, Maryland, USA
- Died: November 9, 1932 (aged 72) St. Raphaël, France
- Turned pro: 1884 (amateur)
- Retired: 1912

Singles
- Career record: 15–36
- Career titles: 0

Grand Slam singles results
- French Open: QF (1901)
- US Open: 2R (1892, 1895)

Other tournaments
- Olympic Games: QF (1900)

Other doubles tournaments
- Olympic Games: Silver Medal (1900)
- Last updated on: September 18, 2012.

Olympic medal record

Men's tennis

Representing a Mixed team
Silver medal – second place	1900 Paris	Men's doubles

Basil Spalding de Garmendia (February 28, 1860 – November 9, 1932) was an American tennis player who competed in the 1900 Summer Olympics.

Spalding de Garmendia was born in Baltimore, Maryland to the wealthy family Garmendia, of Spanish ancestry. In 1900 he won a Silver medal in Men's Doubles event with Max Décugis of France. In the singles, he reached the quarter-finals, losing to Laurence Doherty.

He married to tennis player Mary de Garmendia (1868-1923) who was from New York City. He played with her the mixed double with handicap at the 1900 Summer Olympics where they finished in fifth place. This is an event that is nowadays not recognized by the IOC as an Olympic event.
