= Adrien Fauchier-Magnan =

French tennis player

- Full name: Marie Joseph Adrien Fauchier-Magnan
- Born: 19 November 1873; Paris, France
- Died: 6 August 1963 (aged 89); Cannes, France

Marie Joseph Adrien Fauchier-Magnan (19 November 1873 – 6 August 1963) was a French tennis player. He competed in the men's doubles event at the 1900 Summer Olympics.
