= André Prévost (tennis) =

French tennis player

- Full name: André Adrien Hippolyte Prévost
- Born: 26 March 1860 Paris, Second French Empire
- Died: 15 February 1919 (aged 58) Neuilly-sur-Seine, France
Medal record
Men's tennis
Representing France
Olympic Games
Bronze medal – third place	1900 Paris	Men's doubles

André Adrien Hippolyte Prévost (26 March 1860 – 15 February 1919) was a tennis player competing for France. In 1900, he finished as the runner-up to Paul Aymé in the singles event of the Amateur French Championships . Prévost also competed in the 1900 Summer Olympics in Paris, where he and Georges de la Chapelle shared the bronze medal with Harold Mahony and Arthur Norris in the men's doubles event. His relative, Yvonne, won silver in the women's singles.

== Grand Slam finals ==
=== Singles: 1 (0–1) ===
Outcome	Year	Championship	Surface	Opponent in the final	Score in the final
Runner-up	1900	French Championships	Clay (red)	(France) Paul Aymé	6–3, 6–0
