= Albert Lippmann =

French tennis player

- Full name: Albert Lippmann

Albert Lippmann was a French tennis player. He competed in the men's singles event at the 1900 Summer Olympics.
