= Harry Waidner =

American tennis player

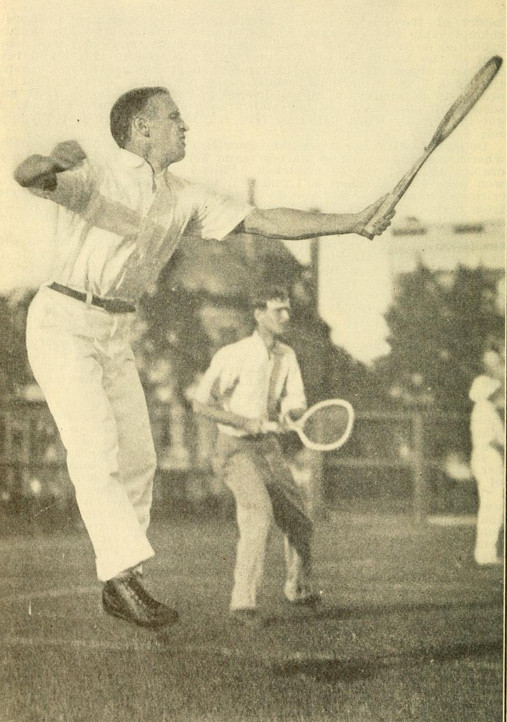
- Waidner in 1904
- Full name: Luis Harry Waidner
- Country (sports): United States
- Born: November 16, 1874 Chicago, Illinois
- Died: August 11, 1944 (aged 69) Evanston, Illinois

Singles

Grand Slam singles results
- US Open: QF (1902)

Louis Harry Waidner (November 16, 1874 – August 11, 1944) was an American tennis player in the early 20th century.

In 1903, Waidner teamed with Kreigh Collins to reach the doubles final of the U.S. Nationals, losing to Reginald Doherty and Laurence Doherty, 7–5, 6–3, 6–3.

At the tennis tournament in Cincinnati, Waidner reached three finals: the 1904 singles final and doubles finals in 1901 and 1903. He lost the singles final to future International Tennis Hall of Famer Beals Wright, 7–5, 6–0, 6–3.

A former president of the USTA/Midwest Section, Waidner has been enshrined in the USTA/Midwest Hall of Fame. He also served as a member of the executive committee of the United States Tennis Association.
