= Arthur Norris =

British tennis player

- Full name: Arthur J.B. Norris
- Country (sports): United Kingdom
- Retired: 1909

Singles

Grand Slam singles results
- Wimbledon: 3R (1903)

Doubles

Grand Slam doubles results
- Wimbledon: QF (1898, 1901, 1903)
Medal record
Men's tennis
Representing United Kingdom
Olympic Games
Bronze medal – third place	1900 Paris	Singles
Bronze medal – third place	1900 Paris	Doubles

Arthur J.B. Norris was a tennis player from Great Britain. At the 1900 Summer Olympics he won two bronze medals, one in singles and one in doubles.
