= Guy de la Chapelle =

French tennis player (1868–1923)

- Full name: Luc Henri Hervé Guy Gardye de la Chapelle
- Born: 16 July 1868; Farges-Allichamps, Second French Empire
- Died: 27 August 1923 (aged 55)
Medal record
Men's tennis
Representing France
Olympic Games
Bronze medal – third place	1900 Paris	Men's doubles

Luc Henri Hervé Guy Gardye de la Chapelle (16 July 1868 – 27 August 1923) was a French tennis player. He competed in the men's doubles event at the 1900 Summer Olympics winning a bronze medal.
