= Paul Lecaron =

French tennis player

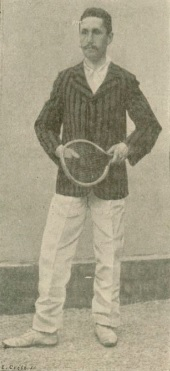
- Full name: Paul Émile Lecaron
- Born: 29 July 1863; Neuilly-sur-Seine, Second French Empire
- Died: 17 September 1940 (aged 77); Paris, Vichy France

Paul Lecaron (29 July 1863 – 17 September 1940) was a French tennis player. He competed in the men's singles and doubles events at the 1900 Summer Olympics.

On the death of his elder brother Maurice Lecaron (1858–1907), and subsequently his father Jean Emile Lecaron (1830–1909), he would inherit in 1885 the perfumes and cosmetics company Gellé Frères which his grandfather Jean Baptiste Augustin Gellé (1801–1895) founded in 1826.

He was named a knight in the National Order of the Legion of Honour in 1921, then an officer in 1926.

He died in 1940 at his residence, Avenue Kléber in Paris.
