= Paul Lebreton =

French tennis player

Louis Paul Lebreton (19 October 1875 in Paris – 31 March 1960 in Paris) was a French tennis player. He was born Bordeaux and died in Lyon. He was three-time a runner-up in the singles event of the Amateur French Championships, losing in 1898 and 1899 to Paul Aymé, and in 1901 to André Vacherot.

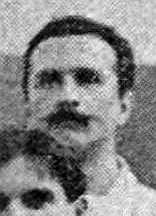
Paul Lebreton en 1902 (Tennis Club de Paris)

He also competed in the men's singles and doubles events at the 1900 Summer Olympics.

== Grand Slam finals ==
=== Singles: 3 (0-3) ===
Outcome	Year	Championship	Surface	Opponent in the final	Score in the final
Runner-up	1898	French Championships	Clay (red)	(France) Paul Aymé	–
Runner-up	1899	French Championships	Clay (red)	(France) Paul Aymé	–
Runner-up	1901	French Championships	Clay (red)	(France) André Vacherot	–
