= Alice Francis Wolf =

American tennis player and squash player

Alice (Francis) Constant Wolf (1907–1990) was a squash player and tennis player who competed in singles and doubles during the 1920s through 1940s. During her career, Wolf won five singles titles, three doubles titles, and four mixed double titles. She reached her highest rank of 10th in women's tennis in the U.S. in 1927. Competing with her husband, Henry, Wolf won the New Jersey State Mixed Doubles Championship at the Westfield Tennis Club in Westfield, New Jersey, four times.

== Early life and education ==
Wolf was born on January 6, 1907, in Orange, New Jersey. She graduated from the Beard School (now Morristown-Beard School) in Orange, NJ in 1924. Morristown-Beard School inducted her into their Athletic Hall of Fame in 1989.

== Tennis achievements in singles ==
Wolf won the 1927 Ardsley Invitational played in Ardsley-on-Hudson, New York, and she finished second in the tournament in 1928 and 1932. She captured the 1928 Bermuda Championship in Hamilton, Bermuda, and the 1928 Mason & Dixon Championships in White Sulphur Springs, West Virginia. Wolf also won the 1928 North and South Tournament in Pinehurst, North Carolina, and the 1931 New Jersey state championship. In 1926, Wolf finished second in the Maryland state championships played in Baltimore. During her teenage years, Wolf finished second in the 1925 Women's National Indoor Tennis Championship.

== Tennis achievements in doubles ==
Wolf won the 1936 Women's Easter Clay Court Doubles Championship and the 1933 Middle States Tennis Doubles Championship. She also won the 1926 Women's Metropolitan Clay Court Doubles Championship.

== Junior tennis achievements ==
Wolf won the 1925 Girls National Indoor Tennis Championships, and she finished second in the 1924 tournament. She also won the 1924 Atlantic Coast Girls Championship played at the Ocean City Club in Ocean City, NJ and the 1925 New Jersey State Women's Tennis Doubles Championship played in Englewood, NJ. In 1925, Wolf captured the Metropolitan Junior Mixed Doubles Championship at the Briarcliff Lodge Tennis and Sports Club in Briarcliff Manor, NY.

== Service to tennis ==
While competing in tennis, Wolf also served the sport. She chaired the tournament committee of the Women's Eastern Clay Court Championship played in Montclair, New Jersey, in 1934.

== Family ==
Alice Wolf married Henry Florian Wolf, a champion of the National Squash Tennis Tournament, at the Orange Lawn Tennis Club on April 17, 1934. They had eight children together: Harry Jr., John, Paul II, Amy, Diana, Alice, Patricia, and Pamela. Henry Florian Wolf won the National Squash Tennis Tournament in 11 successive years (1929–1940). He had an undefeated record in team matches and squash tennis tournaments.
