= Charles Sands =

American golfer, tennis, and real tennis player

- Full name: Charles Edward Sands
- Country (sports): United States
- Born: December 22, 1865 New York, U.S.
- Died: August 9, 1945 (aged 79) Brookville, New York, U.S.
- Height: 181 cm (5 ft 11 in)
- Turned pro: 1886 (amateur tour)
- Retired: 1911

Singles

Grand Slam singles results
- US Open: QF (1894)

Other tournaments
- Olympic Games: 1R (1900)

Doubles

Other doubles tournaments
- Olympic Games: QF (1900)

Mixed doubles

Other mixed doubles tournaments
- Olympic Games: 1R (1900)
Medal record
Men's golf
Representing United States
Olympic Games
Gold medal – first place	1900 Paris	Individual

Charles Edward Sands (December 22, 1865 – August 9, 1945) was an American golfer, tennis and real tennis player who competed in the 1900 Summer Olympics and in the 1908 Summer Olympics.

== Education ==
Sands was educated at Columbia College, where he played tennis and golf, and graduated in 1887. He was posthumously inducted into the Athletics Hall of Fame in 2018.

== Sports career ==
In 1900, he won the gold medal in the men's individual golf competition.

Sands also participated as a lawn tennis player in July 1890 when he won the Northwestern Championships played at the Hotel St. Louis, Minnetonka, Minnesota. In 1891 he won the Middle States Championships held in Hoboken against Howard Taylor.

At the 1900 Olympics, in the singles tournament he was eliminated in the first round. Sands and his British partner Archibald Warden were also eliminated in the first round of the doubles event. Also the mixed doubles competition ended for him and his partner Georgina Jones after the first round.

Eight years later Sands was again eliminated in the first round, this time from the real tennis tournament.
