= Kreigh Collins (tennis) =

American tennis player

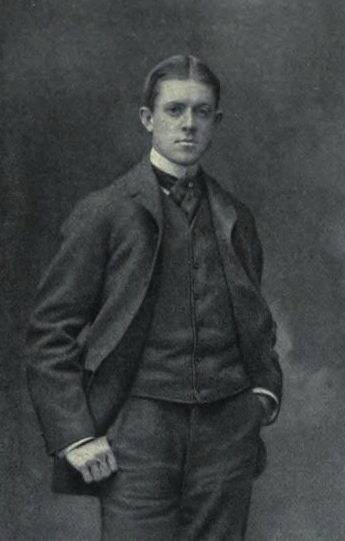
- Country (sports): United States
- Born: January 1875; Illinois, U.S.
- Died: November 16, 1909 (aged 34); Chicago, Illinois, U.S.
- Plays: Right-handed (one-handed backhand)

Singles
- Highest ranking: No. 5 (1899 U.S. ranking)

Grand Slam singles results
- Wimbledon: 3R (1906)
- US Open: SF (1899, 1905)

Doubles

Grand Slam doubles results
- Wimbledon: SF (1906)
- US Open: F (1903, 1904)

Kreigh Collins (January 1875 – November 16, 1909) was an American tennis player from Chicago at the turn of the 20th century. He was ranked No. 5 in the United States in singles in 1899, 1900, 1903 and 1904.

== Tennis career ==
In 1903, he reached the doubles final with L. Harry Waidner at the U.S. National Championships (now known as the U.S. Open) which they lost to the English brothers Reginald and Laurence Doherty in three close sets, 11–9, 12–10, 6–4. The following year, 1904, Collins again reached the doubles finals, this time partnered with Raymond Little and lost in five sets to Holcombe Ward and Beals Wright. In singles, he reached the semifinals twice, in 1899 and 1905, and the quarterfinals in 1902.

At the Cincinnati Open, the oldest tournament in the U.S. played in its original city, Collins won the singles title in 1903 and reached singles finals in 1901, 1902 and 1905. He also was a doubles finalist in 1901 and 1903 (both times with L. Harry Waidner), and a mixed doubles finalist in 1901 (with Carrie Neely).

He also won eight singles titles and four doubles titles at the Western Tennis Championship.

Collins has been inducted into the USTA/Midwest Hall of Fame.

== Personal life ==
He married Ruth Howells Coffin in 1898. In 1906, he went with the United States Davis Cup team to England, but did not compete due to trouble with his eyesight. By the next year, his poor eyesight had forced him completely out of competitive tennis. Collins died on 16 November 1909, after being struck by an electric street car in Chicago.

== Grand Slam finals ==
=== Doubles (2 runner-ups) ===
| Result | Year | Championship | Surface | Partner | Opponents | Score |
|---|---|---|---|---|---|---|
| Runner-up | 1903 | U.S. Championships | Grass | (United States) L. Harry Waidner | (United Kingdom) Reginald Doherty (United Kingdom) Laurence Doherty | 5–7, 3–6, 3–6 |
| Runner-up | 1904 | U.S. Championships | Grass | (United States) Raymond Little | (United States) Holcombe Ward (United States) Beals Wright | 6–1, 2–6, 6–3, 4–6, 1–6 |
