= Edward Larned =

American tennis player

Edward P. Larned
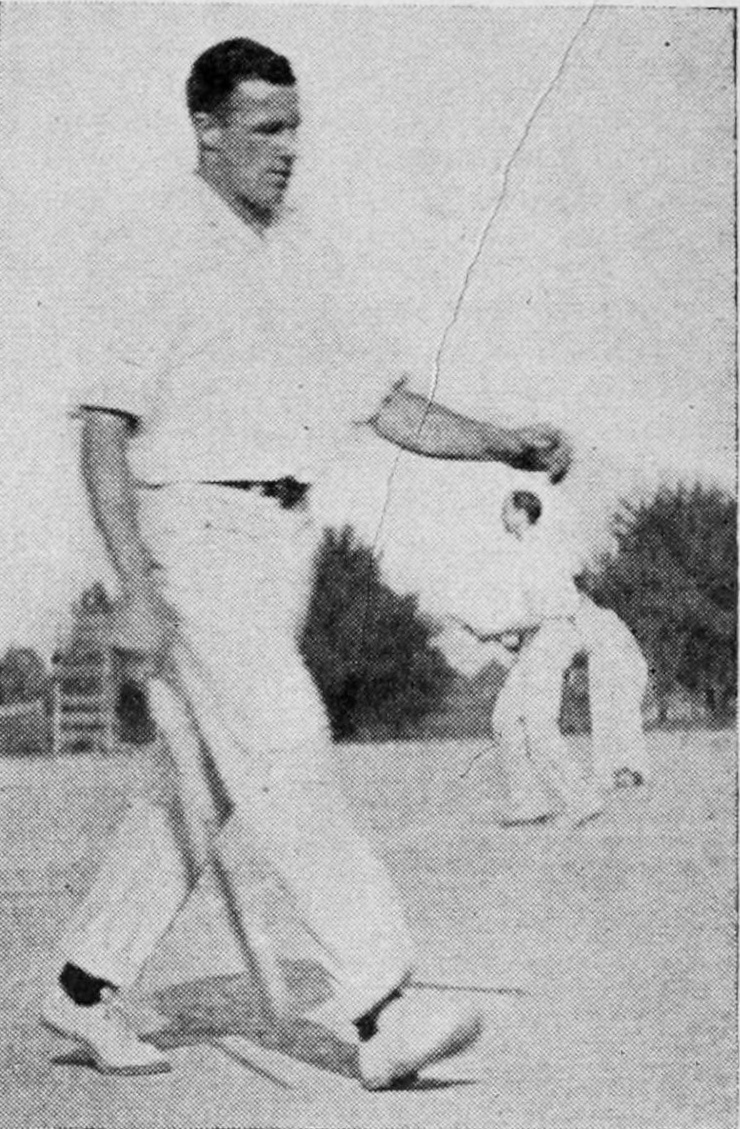
- Full name: Edward Penniman Larned
- Country (sports): United States
- Born: October 28, 1882 Summit, New Jersey, U.S.
- Died: March 20, 1927 (aged 44) Miami, Florida, U.S.
- Turned pro: 1899 (amateur tour)
- Retired: 1918

Singles

Grand Slam singles results
- US Open: SF (1903)

Edward Penniman Larned (Note: Sometimes known as Edwin.) (1882–1927) was an American tennis player. Larned's American roots could be traced back to just after the arrival of the Mayflower. He was born in New Jersey, but later moved to Florida. Larned's elder brother William Larned was seven times U. S. singles champion. Edward was a decade younger than William. He reached the quarter-finals of the U. S. Championships in 1901 (where he handed a walkover to his brother). In 1903 he lost in the semi-finals to William Clothier in straight sets. He reached the fourth round in 1909, lost in round two in 1911, round three in 1912 and round three in 1916. Larned made his last appearance in 1918, where he lost in round one. He was married to Caroline Lesley Fuller, the sister of R. Buckminster Fuller. Larned died from influenza in Miami in 1927, aged 44.
