= All England Plate =

Defunct tennis tournament
- Tour: ILTF
- Founded: 1896; 129 years ago
- Abolished: 1989; 36 years ago
- Location: Wimbledon, London, England
- Venue: All England Lawn Tennis Club
- Surface: Grass

The All England Plate, also referred to as the Wimbledon Plate, was a tennis competition held at the Wimbledon Championships which consisted of players who were defeated in the first or second rounds of the singles competition. The first edition, for male players only, was held in 1896 and the winner was awarded £5 prize money and the runner-up £3. In 1933 the first women's edition was held. In 1975 the competition also became open to players who had lost in the third round of the singles competition as well as players who only participated in the doubles competition. The last edition of the men's tournament was held in 1981 and for the women in 1989.

== Finals ==
=== Men ===
| Year | Country | Champions | Country | Runners-up | Score in the final |
|---|---|---|---|---|---|
| 1896 | BRI | Arthur Gore | BRI | Lawrence Doherty | 1–6, 6–2, 7–5 |
| 1897 | BRI | Herbert Baddeley | BRI | Ernest Crawley | 6–1, 6–3, 5–7, 6–2 |
| 1898 | BRI | George Hillyard | BRI | Allan Pearson | 6–3, 8–6 |
| 1899 | BRI | Wilberforce Eaves | BRI | George Hillyard | w.o. |
| 1900 | BRI | George Greville | BRI | Ernest Black | 6–2, 4–6, 6–3 |
| 1901 | BRI | Philip Pearson | BRI | H. W. Davies | 6–1, 4–6, 6–2, 7–5 |
| 1902 | BRI | Brame Hillyard | BRI | Herbert Lawford | 8–6, 6–1 |
| 1903 | BRI | Arthur Gore | USA | Clarence Hobart | 7–5, 6–3 |
| 1904 | BRI | George Greville | BRI | Brame Hillyard | 6–3, 6–0 |
| 1905 | BRI | Wilberforce Eaves | AUS | B. Murphy | 6–3, 6–2 |
| 1906 | BRI | George Hillyard | BRI | Theodore Mavrogordato | 6–2, 6–4 |
| 1907 | NZL | Anthony Wilding | AUT | Kurt von Wessely | 6–3, 6–4 |
| 1908 | GER | Oscar Kreuzer | RSA | Victor Gauntlett | 6–3, 6–4 |
| 1909 | CAN | Robert Powell | NZL | Harry Parker | 3–6, 6–3, 6–1 |
| 1910 | FRA | André Gobert | NZL | Percival Davson | 6–4, 6–4 |
| 1911 | BRI | Arthur Lowe | BRI | A. C. Parke | 6–0, 8–6 |
| 1912 | BRI | Frank Pearson | AUS | F. E. Barritt | 6–0, 10–8 |
| 1913 | BRI | Gordon Lowe | BRI | F. F. Roe | 8–10, 6–3, 6–3 |
| 1914 | BRI | Charles P. Dixon | BRI | R. W. F. Harding | 6–1, 6–2 |
| 1915 | No competition (due to World War I) | | | | |
| 1916 | No competition (due to World War I) | | | | |
| 1917 | No competition (due to World War I) | | | | |
| 1918 | No competition (due to World War I) | | | | |
| 1919 | BRI | F. R. L. Crawford | BRI | Max Woosnam | 6–3, 5–7, 7–5 |
| 1920 | BRI | Gordon Lowe | BRI | Charles P. Dixon | 1–6, 8–6, 6–3 |
| 1921 | BRI | Brian Gilbert | NZL | Frank Fisher | 7–5, 4–6, 6–0 |
| 1922 | RSA | Brian Norton | AUS | Rupert Wertheim | 6–2, 6–2 |
| 1923 | BEL | Jean Washer | BRI | Josiah Ritchie | 6–3, 6–4 |
| 1924 | RSA | Jack Condon | BRI | Jack Hillyard | 7–5, 6–2 |
| 1925 | HUN | Béla von Kehrling | FRA | Roger George | 6–3, 6–4 |
| 1926 | BRI | Brian Gilbert | BRI | F. R. L. Crawford | 10–8, 6–2 |
| 1927 | FRA | Antoine Gentien | BRI | Oswald Turnbull | 1–6, 6–2, 6–0 |
| 1928 | IND | Mohammed Sleem | BRI | Brian Gilbert | 6–3, 6–3 |
| 1929 | USA | Bud Chandler | BRI | William Powell | 6–4, 6–1 |
| 1930 | FRA | Emmanuel du Plaix | NZL | Cam Malfroy | 6–1, 9–7 |
| 1931 | RSA | Vernon Kirby | IRL | George Lyttleton-Rogers | 2–6, 6–3, 6–3 |
| 1932 | FRA | Henri Cochet | JPN | Takeo Kuwabara | 6–2, 6–4 |
| 1933 | GBR | Frank Wilde | GBR | Patrick Wheatley | 6–2, 6–4 |
| 1934 | AUT | Hermann Artens | GBR | Raymond Tuckey | 5–7, 7–5, 6–1 |
| 1935 | JPN | Jiro Yamagishi | FRA | Jean Lesueur | 6–2, 6–2 |
| 1936 | USA | D. N. Jones | GBR | Ian Collins | 6–0, 6–2 |
| 1937 | USA | Wayne Sabin | RSA | Norman Farquharson | 2–6, 6–0, 6–3 |
| 1938 | GBR | Don Butler | HUN | Ottó Szigeti | 6–1, 8–10, 6–3 |
| 1939 | USA | Don McNeill | BEL | Jacques Van den Eynde | 8–6, 6–2 |
| 1940 | No competition (due to World War II) | | | | |
| 1941 | No competition (due to World War II) | | | | |
| 1942 | No competition (due to World War II) | | | | |
| 1943 | No competition (due to World War II) | | | | |
| 1944 | No competition (due to World War II) | | | | |
| 1945 | No competition (due to World War II) | | | | |
| 1946 | FRA | Robert Abdesselam | POL | Czesław Spychała | 7–5, 6–3 |
| 1947 | RSA | Eric Sturgess | GBR | Tony Mottram | 6–3, 6–3 |
| 1948 | PHI | Felicisimo Ampon | ARG | Heraldo Weiss | 11–9, 6–4 |
| 1949 | USA | Earl Cochell | IRL | Guy Jackson | 4–6, 6–3, 6–1 |
| 1950 | GBR | Geoff Paish | BEL | Jacques Brichant | 6–4, 6–4 |
| 1951 | RSA | Nigel Cockburn | HKG | Ip Koon Hung | 7–5, 5–7, 10–8 |
| 1952 | CHI | Luis Ayala | IND | Naresh Kumar | 8–6, 6–2 |
| 1953 | GBR | Geoff Paish | USA | John Ager | 4–6, 6–2 |
| 1954 | USA | Hugh Stewart | BRA | Armando Vieira | 8–6, 6–0, 7–5 |
| 1955 | AUS | Neale Fraser | AUS | Bob Howe | 6–2, 7–5 |
| 1956 | USA | Hugh Stewart | USA | Gardnar Mulloy | 4–6, 6–4, 6–4 |
| 1957 | RSA | Gordon Forbes | RSA | Abe Segal | 10–8, 11–13, 6–3 |
| 1958 | FRA | Paul Rémy | FRA | Jean Noël Grinda | 6–3, 11–9 |
| 1959 | TCH | Jiří Javorský | USA | Mal Fox | 6–3, 6–2 |
| 1960 | DEN | Torben Ulrich | ITA | Orlando Sirola | 6–4, 7–5 |
| 1961 | DEN | Jørgen Ulrich | IND | Naresh Kumar | 6–4, 10–12, 6–3 |
| 1962 | USA | Jon Douglas | RSA | Abe Segal | 3–6, 6–2, 6–3 |
| 1963 | USA | Gene Scott | NZL | Ian Crookenden | w.o. |
| 1964 | GBR | Bobby Wilson | AUS | Bill Bowrey | 6–4, 6–3 |
| 1965 | AUS | Owen Davidson | NED | Tom Okker | 6–3, 8–6 |
| 1966 | GBR | Roger Taylor | AUS | Bob Howe | 6–4, 2–6, 7–5 |
| 1967 | USA | Jim McManus | USA | Gene Scott | 6–3, 6–2 |
| 1968 | GBR | Gerald Battrick | USA | Herb Fitzgibbon | 6–4, 3–6, 7–5 |
| 1969 | BRA | Thomaz Koch | AUS | Ray Ruffels | 6–1, 6–3 |
| 1970 | RSA | Bob Maud | USA | Roy Barth | 6–3, 6–3 |
| 1971 | AUS | Dick Crealy | CHI | Patricio Cornejo | 6–3, 6–4 |
| 1972 | AUS | Kim Warwick | | N/A | w.o. |
| 1973 | GBR | John Clifton | USA | Steve Messmer | 6–4, 4–6, 6–1 |
| 1974 | URS | Teimuraz Kakulia | AUS | Paul Kronk | 6–3, 5–7 |
| 1975 | BRA | Thomaz Koch | USA | Vitas Gerulaitis | 6–3, 6–2 |
| 1976 | NZL | Brian Fairlie | GBR | Roger Taylor | 4–6, 6–3, 6–4 |
| 1977 | USA | Marty Riessen | USA | Raz Reid | 6–4, 5–7, 9–7 |
| 1978 | AUS | Dale Collings | USA | Tim Wilkison | 3–6, 9–8, 6–4 |
| 1979 | AUS | Paul Kronk | AUS | Mark Edmondson | 6–7, 6–2, 6–4 |
| 1980 | ISR | Shlomo Glickstein | FRA | Patrice Dominguez | 6–3, 7–6 |
| 1981 | AUS | David Carter | AUS | Chris Johnstone | 6–3, 6–4 |

=== Women ===
| Year | Country | Champions | Country | Runners-up | Score in the final |
|---|---|---|---|---|---|
| 1933 | FRA | Colette Rosambert | FRA | Jacqueline Goldschmidt | 6–4, 6–1 |
| 1934 | ITA | Lucia Valerio | GBR | Jean Saunders | 7–5, 6–3 |
| 1935 | ITA | Lucia Valerio | GBR | Alex McOstrich | 6–1, 1–6, 6–1 |
| 1936 | GBR | Florence Ford | GBR | Mona Riddell | 6–4, 6–4 |
| 1937 | GBR | Freda James | GBR | Margot Lumb | 6–0, 7–5 |
| 1938 | AUS | Dorothy Stevenson | AUS | Joan Hartigan | 6–4, 6–4 |
| 1939 | GBR | Mrs. Alex McKelvie | LUX | Alice Weiwers | 6–4, 4–6, 6–2 |
| 1940 | No competition (due to World War II) | | | | |
| 1941 | No competition (due to World War II) | | | | |
| 1942 | No competition (due to World War II) | | | | |
| 1943 | No competition (due to World War II) | | | | |
| 1944 | No competition (due to World War II) | | | | |
| 1945 | No competition (due to World War II) | | | | |
| 1946 | POL | Jadwiga Jędrzejowska | GBR | Patsy O'Connell | 6–4, 7–5 |
| 1947 | POL | Jadwiga Jędrzejowska | GBR | Molly Blair | 6–2, 7–5 |
| 1948 | ARG | Maria Weiss | GBR | Betty Wilford | 6–1, 5–7, 7–5 |
| 1949 | ITA | Annalisa Bossi | SWE | Bibbi Gullbrandsson | 6–0, 7–5 |
| 1950 | GBR | Kay Tuckey | USA | Betty Rosenquest | 6–4, 6–1 |
| 1951 | RSA | Beryl Bartlett | GBR | Georgie Woodgate | 3–6, 6–1, 6–2 |
| 1952 | EGY | Betsy Abbas | GBR | Gem Hoahing | 0–6, 6–4, 6–3 |
| 1953 | GBR | Pat Harrison | IRL | Betty Lombard | 1–6, 6–3, 6–3 |
| 1954 | GBR | Rosemary Walsh | GBR | Pat Hird | 6–2, 7–5 |
| 1955 | AUS | Fay Muller | USA | Lois Felix | 6–4, 6–4 |
| 1956 | AUS | Thelma Coyne Long | FRG | Ilse Buding | 6–3, 6–4 |
| 1957 | AUS | Margaret Hellyer | RSA | Renée Schuurman | 6–4, 6–4 |
| 1958 | RSA | Sandra Reynolds | AUS | Margaret Hellyer | 6–2, 6–2 |
| 1959 | GBR | Shirley Brasher | CAN | Hanna Sladek | 3–6, 6–3, 7–5 |
| 1960 | GBR | Deidre Catt | GBR | Lorna Cawthorn | 6–3, 6–2 |
| 1961 | GBR | Rita Bentley | URS | Anna Dmitrieva | 6–4, 3–6, 6–3 |
| 1962 | RSA | Marlene Gerson | AUS | Margaret Hellyer | 6–2, 6–1 |
| 1963 | FRA | Françoise Dürr | URS | Anna Dmitrieva | 6–1, 6–3 |
| 1964 | TCH | Věra Suková | USA | Justina Bricka | 0–6, 6–2, 6–2 |
| 1965 | URS | Anna Dmitrieva | GBR | Nell Truman | 6–2, 6–1 |
| 1966 | RSA | Pat Walkden | GBR | Robin Lloyd | 6–4, 6–0 |
| 1967 | USA | Patti Hogan | AUS | Gail Sherriff | 6–2, 9–7 |
| 1968 | GBR | Virginia Wade | USA | Kathleen Harter | 6–2, 12–10 |
| 1969 | USA | Betty-Ann Grubb | RSA | Laura Rossouw | 6–3, 4–6, 6–4 |
| 1970 | AUS | Evonne Goolagong | INA | Lita Liem | 6–2, 6–1 |
| 1971 | GBR | Janice Wainwright | NED | Betty Stöve | 6–4, 0–6, 6–2 |
| 1972 | AUS | Karen Krantzcke | USA | Sharon Walsh | 6–1, 6–4 |
| 1973 | AUS | Helen Gourlay | GBR | Veronica Burton | 6–1, 4–6, 6–1 |
| 1974 | URS | Marina Kroschina | GBR | Lindsey Beaven | 6–3, 8–6 |
| 1975 | AUS | Dianne Fromholtz | GBR | Veronica Burton | 6–4, 6–2 |
| 1976 | SWE | Mimmi Wikstedt | USA | Bunny Bruning | 4–6, 6–3, 6–3 |
| 1977 | RSA | Yvonne Vermaak | GBR | Sue Mappin | 6–2, 7–5 |
| 1978 | USA | Mona Guerrant | TCH | Hana Strachoňová | 6–2, 8–6 |
| 1979 | GBR | Sue Barker | ITA | Sabina Simmonds | 7–6, 6–0 |
| 1980 | RSA | Rosalyn Fairbank | USA | Sharon Walsh | 6–4, 6–2 |
| 1981 | AUS | Sue Saliba | USA | Pam Casale | 6–3, 6–3 |
| 1982 | BRA | Cláudia Monteiro | USA | Renee Blount | 6–3, 2–6, 6–2 |
| 1983 | GBR | Amanda Brown | AUS | Amanda Tobin | 3–6, 6–3, 6–4 |
| 1984 | USA | Melissa Brown | USA | Robin White | 6–2, 7–5 |
| 1985 | RSA | Elna Reinach | USA | Terry Holladay | 6–4, 6–2 |
| 1986 | USA | Pam Shriver | USA | Stephanie Rehe | 4–6, 7–6^{(7–1)}, 6–0 |
| 1987 | GBR | Sara Gomer | USA | Kate Gompert | 6–3, 6–4 |
| 1988 | USA | Gretchen Magers | GBR | Sara Gomer | 6–1, ret. |
| 1989 | USA | Wendy White | RSA | Elna Reinach | 6–3, 6–4 |
