= 1900 Wimbledon Championships – Men's doubles =

Men's doubles
- 1900 Wimbledon Championships

Final
- Champions: (United Kingdom) Laurence Doherty (United Kingdom) Reginald Doherty
- Runners-up: (United Kingdom) Herbert Roper Barrett (United Kingdom) Harold Nisbet
- Score: 9–7, 7–5, 4–6, 3–6, 6–3

Details
- Draw: 14
- Seeds: –

Events
Singles	men	women
Doubles	men	women
← 1899 ·	Wimbledon Championships	· 1901 →

Herbert Roper Barrett and Harold Nisbet defeated Frank Riseley and Sydney Smith 6–2, 2–6, 6–8, 8–6, 6–2 in the All Comers' Final, but the reigning champions Laurence Doherty and Reginald Doherty defeated Barrett and Nisbet 9–7, 7–5, 4–6, 3–6, 6–3 in the challenge round to win the gentlemen's doubles tennis title at the 1900 Wimbledon Championships.

== Draw ==
=== Key ===
- Q = Qualifier
- WC = Wild card
- LL = Lucky loser
- Alt = Alternate
- SE = Special exempt
- PR = Protected ranking
- ITF = ITF entry
- JE = Junior exempt
- w/o = Walkover
- r = Retired
- d = Defaulted
- SR = Special ranking

=== Challenge round ===
Challenge Round
(United Kingdom) Herbert Roper Barrett (United Kingdom) Harold Nisbet	7	5	6	6	3
(United Kingdom) Laurence Doherty (United Kingdom) Reginald Doherty	9	7	4	3	6

=== All Comers' ===
First round
(United Kingdom) Arthur Gore (United Kingdom) George Simond
(United Kingdom) A Raleigh (United Kingdom) Lionel Escombe	w/o
(United Kingdom) David Hawes (United Kingdom) Allan Pearson	6	6	6
(United Kingdom) Gillibrand Evered (United Kingdom) Wilfred Milne	3	1	4
(United Kingdom) Frank Riseley (United Kingdom) Sydney Smith	6	6	7
(United Kingdom) Charles Dixon (United Kingdom) Major Ritchie	3	3	5
(United Kingdom) Frederick Plaskitt (United Kingdom) FN BWarden	6	6	7
(United Kingdom) Nigel Davidson (United Kingdom) Roderick McNair	3	3	5
(United Kingdom) Clement Cazalet (United Kingdom) George Hillyard	6	6	6
(United Kingdom) Hugh Plaskitt (United Kingdom) B Wood-Hill	1	4	2
(United Kingdom) Herbert Roper Barrett (United Kingdom) Harold Nisbet	6	6	6
(United Kingdom) John Flavelle (United Kingdom) Frederick Payn	3	3	4

Quarterfinals
(United Kingdom) Walter Bailey (United Kingdom) Brame Hillyard	4	6	6	3
(United Kingdom) Arthur Gore (United Kingdom) George Simond	6	3	8	6
(United Kingdom) David Hawes (United Kingdom) Allan Pearson	2	2	0
(United Kingdom) Frank Riseley (United Kingdom) Sydney Smith	6	6	6
(United Kingdom) Frederick Plaskitt (United Kingdom) FN Warden	1	4	1
(United Kingdom) Clement Cazalet (United Kingdom) George Hillyard	6	6	6
(United Kingdom) Herbert Roper Barrett (United Kingdom) Harold Nisbet	6	11	6
(United Kingdom) Ernest Black (United Kingdom) Harold Mahony	3	9	2

Semifinals
(United Kingdom) Arthur Gore (United Kingdom) George Simond	3	5	1
(United Kingdom) Frank Riseley (United Kingdom) Sydney Smith	6	7	6
(United Kingdom) Clement Cazalet (United Kingdom) George Hillyard	3	9	2
(United Kingdom) Herbert Roper Barrett (United Kingdom) Harold Nisbet	6	11	6

Final
(United Kingdom) Frank Riseley (United Kingdom) Sydney Smith	2	6	8	6	2
(United Kingdom) Herbert Roper Barrett (United Kingdom) Harold Nisbet	6	2	6	8	6
