= 1902 Wimbledon Championships – Men's doubles =

Men's doubles
- 1902 Wimbledon Championships

Final
- Champions: (United Kingdom) Frank Riseley (United Kingdom) Sydney Smith
- Runners-up: (United Kingdom) Laurence Doherty (United Kingdom) Reginald Doherty
- Score: 4–6, 8–6, 6–3, 4–6, 11–9

Details
- Draw: 19
- Seeds: –

Events
Singles	men	women
Doubles	men	women
← 1901 ·	Wimbledon Championships	· 1903 →

Frank Riseley and Sydney Smith defeated Clement Cazalet and George Hillyard 7–5, 2–6, 3–6, 6–3, 6–1 in the All Comers' Final, and then defeated the reigning champions Laurence Doherty and Reginald Doherty 4–6, 8–6, 6–3, 4–6, 11–9 in the challenge round to win the gentlemen's doubles tennis title at the 1902 Wimbledon Championships.

== Draw ==
=== Key ===
- Q = Qualifier
- WC = Wild card
- LL = Lucky loser
- Alt = Alternate
- SE = Special exempt
- PR = Protected ranking
- ITF = ITF entry
- JE = Junior exempt
- w/o = Walkover
- r = Retired
- d = Defaulted
- SR = Special ranking

=== Challenge round ===
Challenge round
(United Kingdom) Frank Riseley (United Kingdom) Sydney Smith	4	8	6	4	11
(United Kingdom) Laurence Doherty (United Kingdom) Reginald Doherty	6	6	3	6	9

=== All comers' finals ===
Semifinals
(Belgium) William le Maire de Warzée (Belgium) Paul de Borman	4	3	3
(United Kingdom) Frank Riseley (United Kingdom) Sydney Smith	6	6	6
(United Kingdom) Clement Cazalet (United Kingdom) George Hillyard	6	4	9	6
(United Kingdom) George Ball-Greene (United Kingdom) Herbert Roper Barrett	2	6	7	2

Final
(United Kingdom) Frank Riseley (United Kingdom) Sydney Smith	7	2	3	6	6
(United Kingdom) Clement Cazalet (United Kingdom) George Hillyard	5	6	6	3	1

=== Top half ===
First round
(United Kingdom) Major Ritchie (United Kingdom) HM Sweetman
(United Kingdom) Alfred Crawley (United Kingdom) Walter Crawley	w/o
(United Kingdom) Frank Riseley (United Kingdom) Sydney Smith	6	6	6
(United Kingdom) A Raleigh (United Kingdom) ER Clarke	2	2	2

Second round
(Belgium) William le Maire de Warzée (Belgium) Paul de Borman	6	6	6
(United Kingdom) Edmund Donisthorpe (United Kingdom) Frank Donisthorpe	3	4	4
(United Kingdom) Leslie Hausburg (United Kingdom) Charles Simond
(United Kingdom) RM Sweetman (United Kingdom) E Yatman	w/o
(United Kingdom) COS Hatton (United Kingdom) CH Martin	6	6	6
(United Kingdom) F Good (United Kingdom) Brame Hillyard	3	1	3
(United Kingdom) M Ritchie (United Kingdom) HM Sweetman	2	4	5
(United Kingdom) F Riseley (United Kingdom) S Smith	6	6	7

Quarterfinals
(Belgium) W le Maire de Warzée (Belgium) P de Borman	4	3	6	6	6
(United Kingdom) L Hausburg (United Kingdom) C Simond	6	6	4	1	1
(United Kingdom) COS Hatton (United Kingdom) CH Martin	w/o
(United Kingdom) F Riseley (United Kingdom) S Smith

Semifinals
(Belgium) W le Maire de Warzée (Belgium) P de Borman	4	3	3
(United Kingdom) F Riseley (United Kingdom) S Smith	6	6	6

=== Bottom half ===
First round
(United Kingdom) Allan Pearson (United Kingdom) R Williams	6	6	6	6
(United Kingdom) JK Frost (United Kingdom) CH Mounsey	2	8	1	2
(United Kingdom) Clement Cazalet (United Kingdom) George Hillyard	6	9	2	6
(United Kingdom) HL Fleming (United Kingdom) Harold Mahony	3	7	6	2

Second round
(United Kingdom) A Pearson (United Kingdom) R Williams	7	6	6	6
(United Kingdom) C Cazalet (United Kingdom) G Hillyard	5	8	1	1
(United Kingdom) George Caridia (United Kingdom) George Simond
(United Kingdom) Lionel Escombe (United Kingdom) Robert Hough	w/o
(United Kingdom) Walter Bailey (United Kingdom) L Mossop	7	6	6
(United Kingdom) Evelyn Mellor (United Kingdom) A Walker	5	2	2
(United Kingdom) George Ball-Greene (United Kingdom) Herbert Roper Barrett	6	6	6
(United Kingdom) Arthur Norris (United Kingdom) Henry Wilson-Fox	2	4	2

Quarterfinals
(United Kingdom) C Cazalet (United Kingdom) G Hillyard	6	6	6
(United Kingdom) G Caridia (United Kingdom) G Simond	4	0	4
(United Kingdom) W Bailey (United Kingdom) L Mossop	2	2	4
(United Kingdom) G Ball-Greene (United Kingdom) HR Barrett	6	6	6

Semifinals
(United Kingdom) C Cazalet (United Kingdom) G Hillyard	6	4	9	6
(United Kingdom) G Ball-Greene (United Kingdom) HR Barrett	2	6	7	2
