= 1906 Wimbledon Championships – Men's doubles =

Men's doubles
- 1906 Wimbledon Championships

Final
- Champions: (United Kingdom) Frank Riseley (United Kingdom) Sydney Smith
- Runners-up: (United Kingdom) Laurence Doherty (United Kingdom) Reginald Doherty
- Score: 6–8, 6–4, 5–7, 6–3, 6–3

Details
- Draw: 28
- Seeds: –

Events
Singles	men	women
Doubles	men	women
← 1905 ·	Wimbledon Championships	· 1907 →

Frank Riseley and Sydney Smith defeated Clement Cazalet and George Simond 6–2, 6–2, 5–7, 6–4 in the All Comers' Final, and then defeated the reigning champions Laurence Doherty and Reginald Doherty 6–8, 6–4, 5–7, 6–3, 6–3 in the challenge round to win the gentlemen's doubles tennis title at the 1906 Wimbledon Championships.

== Draw ==
=== Key ===
- Q = Qualifier
- WC = Wild card
- LL = Lucky loser
- Alt = Alternate
- SE = Special exempt
- PR = Protected ranking
- ITF = ITF entry
- JE = Junior exempt
- w/o = Walkover
- r = Retired
- d = Defaulted
- SR = Special ranking

=== Challenge round ===
Challenge Round
(United Kingdom) Frank Riseley (United Kingdom) Sydney Smith	6	6	5	6	6
(United Kingdom) Laurence Doherty (United Kingdom) Reginald Doherty	8	4	7	3	3

=== All comers' finals ===
Semifinals
(United Kingdom) Frank Riseley (United Kingdom) Sydney Smith	6	7	6
(United Kingdom) Major Ritchie (New Zealand) Anthony Wilding	4	5	3
(United States) Kreigh Collins (United States) Raymond Little	6	9	3	4	4
(United Kingdom) Clement Cazalet (United Kingdom) George Simond	2	7	6	6	6

Final
(United Kingdom) Frank Riseley (United Kingdom) Sydney Smith	6	6	5	6
(United Kingdom) Clement Cazalet (United Kingdom) George Simond	2	2	7	4

=== Top half ===
First round
(United Kingdom) Frank Riseley (United Kingdom) Sydney Smith	6	6	6
(Germany) L Kulenkampff (Germany) Carl Zenger	0	0	1
(United Kingdom) Arthur Lowe (United Kingdom) Gordon Lowe	1	6	6	7
(United Kingdom) Lionel Escombe (United Kingdom) Robert Hough	6	1	2	5
(United Kingdom) ER Clarke (United Kingdom) EW Timmis	6	6	6
(United Kingdom) Walter Bailey (United Kingdom) JK Frost	3	3	3
(United Kingdom) Major Ritchie (New Zealand) Anthony Wilding	6	6	6
(United Kingdom) Kenneth Powell (United Kingdom) Leslie Powell	1	2	3
(Germany) RF Kalberer (United Kingdom) JS Talbot	7	4	4	6	9
(United Kingdom) CM Mounsey (United Kingdom) Alfred Sterry	5	6	6	3	7
(United Kingdom) TD Stoward (United Kingdom) George Thomas	6	6	9
(United States) ER Paterson (Germany) Ferdinand Uhl	1	2	7

Second round
(United Kingdom) Arthur Gore (United Kingdom) George Hillyard	6	6	6
(United Kingdom) Roderick McNair (United Kingdom) Albert Prebble	3	2	4
(United Kingdom) F Riseley (United Kingdom) S Smith	6	6	6
(United Kingdom) A Lowe (United Kingdom) G Lowe	2	0	2
(United Kingdom) ER Clarke (United Kingdom) EW Timmis	2	2	1
(United Kingdom) M Ritchie (New Zealand) A Wilding	6	6	6
(Germany) RF Kalberer (United Kingdom) JS Talbot	3	3	5
(United Kingdom) TD Stoward (United Kingdom) G Thomas	6	6	7

Quarterfinals
(United Kingdom) AW Gore (United Kingdom) GW Hillyard	2	1	4
(United Kingdom) F Riseley (United Kingdom) S Smith	6	6	6
(United Kingdom) M Ritchie (New Zealand) A Wilding	7	6	6	6
(United Kingdom) TD Stoward (United Kingdom) G Thomas	9	3	3	1

Semifinals
(United Kingdom) F Riseley (United Kingdom) S Smith	6	7	6
(United Kingdom) M Ritchie (New Zealand) A Wilding	4	5	3

=== Bottom half ===
First round
(United Kingdom) Alfred Beamish (United Kingdom) Henry Pollard	6	3	6	6
(United Kingdom) John Ganzoni (United Kingdom) Charles Gouldesborough	2	6	3	1
(United Kingdom) Fritz Goldberg (United Kingdom) JB Ward	6	8	6
(United Kingdom) WS Andrews (United Kingdom) EN Crowder	4	6	2
(United States) Kreigh Collins (United States) Raymond Little
(United Kingdom) Frederick Plaskitt (United Kingdom) Hugh Plaskitt	w/o
(United Kingdom) Charles Simond (United Kingdom) Alfred Taylor
(United Kingdom) Capt. Beasley (United Kingdom) P Jacob	w/o
(United Kingdom) George Ball-Greene (United Kingdom) Wilberforce Eaves	6	6	6
(United Kingdom) FW Perceval (United Kingdom) O Plunkett	2	2	3
(United Kingdom) Clement Cazalet (United Kingdom) George Simond	6	6	6
(United Kingdom) Evan Gwynne-Evans (United Kingdom) Theodore Mavrogordato	3	2	4

Second round
(United Kingdom) A Beamish (United Kingdom) H Pollard	6	7	4	10
(United Kingdom) F Goldberg (United Kingdom) JB Ward	1	5	6	8
(United States) K Collins (United States) R Little	6	7	6
(United Kingdom) C Simond (United Kingdom) A Taylor	2	5	2
(United Kingdom) G Ball-Greene (United Kingdom) W Eaves	4	8	1
(United Kingdom) C Cazalet (United Kingdom) G Simond	6	10	6
(United Kingdom) EL Bristow (United Kingdom) Cecil Hartley	6	4	7	7
(United Kingdom) Peter Hicks (Germany) Heinrich Schomburgk	2	6	5	5

Quarterfinals
(United Kingdom) A Beamish (United Kingdom) H Pollard	3	2	5
(United States) K Collins (United States) R Little	6	6	7
(United Kingdom) C Cazalet (United Kingdom) G Simond	6	6	6
(United Kingdom) EL Bristow (United Kingdom) C Hartley	3	3	3

Semifinals
(United States) K Collins (United States) R Little	6	9	3	4	4
(United Kingdom) C Cazalet (United Kingdom) G Simond	2	7	6	6	6
