= 1900 Wimbledon Championships – Men's singles =

Men's singles
- 1900 Wimbledon Championships

Final
- Champion: (United Kingdom) Reginald Doherty
- Runner-up: (United Kingdom) Sydney Smith
- Score: 6–8, 6–3, 6–1, 6–2

Details
- Draw: 34
- Seeds: –

Events
| Singles | men | women |
| Doubles | men | women |
| ← 1899 · | Wimbledon Championships | · 1901 → |

Sydney Smith defeated Arthur Gore 6–4, 4–6, 6–2, 6–1 in the All Comers' Final, but the reigning champion Reginald Doherty defeated Smith 6–8, 6–3, 6–1, 6–2 in the challenge round to win the gentlemen's singles tennis title at the 1900 Wimbledon Championships.

== Draw ==
=== Key ===
- Q = Qualifier
- WC = Wild card
- LL = Lucky loser
- Alt = Alternate
- SE = Special exempt
- PR = Protected ranking
- ITF = ITF entry
- JE = Junior exempt
- w/o = Walkover
- r = Retired
- d = Defaulted
- SR = Special ranking

=== Challenge round ===
| Challenge Round |
| (United Kingdom) Sydney Smith | 8 | 3 | 1 | 2 |
| (United Kingdom) Reginald Doherty | 6 | 6 | 6 | 6 |

=== All comers' finals ===
Quarterfinals
(United Kingdom) Frederick Plaskitt | 3 | 2 | 0
(United Kingdom) Arthur Gore | 6 | 6 | 6
(United Kingdom) Laurence Doherty | 6 | 6 | 6
(United Kingdom) Roderick McNair | 1 | 2 | 4
(United Kingdom) Sydney Smith | 6 | 4 | 7 | 6
(United Kingdom) Herbert Roper Barrett | 1 | 6 | 5 | 2
(United Kingdom) Harold Nisbet | 6 | 6 | 6 | 3 | 6
(United Kingdom) Frederick Payn | 2 | 8 | 4 | 6 | 2

Semifinals
(United Kingdom) Arthur Gore | 4 | 8 | 8 | 6
(United Kingdom) Laurence Doherty | 6 | 6 | 6 | 1
(United Kingdom) Sydney Smith | 6 | 6 | 6
(United Kingdom) Harold Nisbet | 0 | 1 | 1

Final
(United Kingdom) Arthur Gore | 4 | 6 | 2 | 1
(United Kingdom) Sydney Smith | 6 | 4 | 6 | 6

=== Top half ===
==== Section 1 ====
First round

Second round
(United Kingdom) Robert Hough | 5 | 6 | 3 | 7 | 6
(United Kingdom) FN Warden | 7 | 3 | 6 | 5 | 4
(United Kingdom) Frederick Plaskitt | 6 | 6 | 6
(United Kingdom) Oswald Milne | 3 | 4 | 3
(United Kingdom) Clement Cazalet | 7 | 6 | 6 | 8 | 6
(United Kingdom) Harold Mahony | 5 | 2 | 8 | 10 | 4
(United Kingdom) David Hawes | 1 | 2 | 3
(United Kingdom) Arthur Gore | 6 | 6 | 6

Third round
(United Kingdom) R Hough | 6 | 3 | 4 | 4
(United Kingdom) F Plaskitt | 3 | 6 | 6 | 6
(United Kingdom) C Cazalet | 1 | 7 | 2 | 2
(United Kingdom) A Gore | 6 | 5 | 6 | 6

Fourth round
(United Kingdom) F Plaskitt | 6 | 6 | 6
(United Kingdom) A Gore | 3 | 2 | 0

==== Section 2 ====
First round
(United Kingdom) Nigel Davidson | 6 | 6 | 6 | 4
(United Kingdom) S Herbert | 3 | 8 | 3 | 0^{r}

Second round
(United Kingdom) Frank Riseley | w/o
(United Kingdom) Allan Pearson
(United Kingdom) Laurence Doherty | 6 | 6 | 6
(United Kingdom) Ernest Wills | 0 | 4 | 1
(United Kingdom) S Baddeley | 6 | 6 | 6
(United Kingdom) A Raleigh | 0 | 1 | 3
(United Kingdom) Roderick McNair | 6 | 6 | 5 | 6
(United Kingdom) N Davidson | 2 | 2 | 7 | 0

Third round
(United Kingdom) A Pearson | 3 | 1 | 3
(United Kingdom) L Doherty | 6 | 6 | 6
(United Kingdom) S Baddeley | 1 | 1 | 6 | 6 | 3
(United Kingdom) R McNair | 6 | 6 | 4 | 3 | 6

Fourth round
(United Kingdom) L Doherty | 6 | 6 | 6
(United Kingdom) R McNair | 1 | 2 | 4

=== Bottom half ===
==== Section 3 ====
First round
(United Kingdom) Sydney Smith | 6 | 6 | 3 | 6 | 9
(United Kingdom) Ernest Black | 4 | 8 | 6 | 1 | 7

Second round
(United Kingdom) S Smith | 6 | 6 | 5 | 3 | 6
(United Kingdom) George Greville | 1 | 3 | 7 | 6 | 1
(United Kingdom) GL Orme | 2 | 6 | 4 | 6 | 6
(United Kingdom) John Flavelle | 6 | 1 | 6 | 4 | 1
(United Kingdom) Herbert Roper Barrett | 6 | 6 | 6
(United Kingdom) George Simond | 3 | 1 | 2
(United Kingdom) Charles Dixon
(United Kingdom) Brame Hillyard | w/o

Third round
(United Kingdom) S Smith | 6 | 6 | 6
(United Kingdom) GL Orme | 1 | 2 | 2
(United Kingdom) HR Barrett | 6 | 6 | 6
(United Kingdom) C Dixon | 4 | 0 | 3

Fourth round
(United Kingdom) S Smith | 6 | 4 | 7 | 6 | 2
(United Kingdom) HR Barrett | 1 | 6 | 5 | 2 | 2

==== Section 4 ====
First round

Second round
(United Kingdom) Gillibrand Evered | 6 | 7 | 6
(United Kingdom) Herbert Chipp | 2 | 5 | 0
(United Kingdom) Harold Nisbet
(United Kingdom) B Wood-Hill | w/o
(United Kingdom) Frederick Payn | 6 | 6 | 6
(United Kingdom) Hugh Plaskitt | 4 | 4 | 4
(United Kingdom) Lionel Escombe | 3 | 4 | 4
(United Kingdom) Major Ritchie | 6 | 6 | 6

Third round
(United Kingdom) GE Evered | 3 | 0 | 3
(United Kingdom) H Nisbet | 6 | 6 | 6
(United Kingdom) F Payn | 6 | 2 | 2 | 6 | 7
(United Kingdom) M Ritchie | 3 | 6 | 6 | 4 | 5

Fourth round
(United Kingdom) H Nisbet | 6 | 6 | 6 | 3 | 6
(United Kingdom) F Payn | 2 | 8 | 4 | 6 | 2

| Preceded by 1899 U.S. National Championships – Men's singles | Grand Slam men's singles | Succeeded by 1901 U.S. National Championships – Men's singles |
