= 1903 Wimbledon Championships – Men's singles =

Men's singles
- 1903 Wimbledon Championships

Final
- Champion: (United Kingdom) Laurence Doherty
- Runner-up: (United Kingdom) Frank Riseley
- Score: 7–5, 6–3, 6–0

Details
- Draw: 42
- Seeds: –

Events
Singles	men	women
Doubles	men	women
← 1902 ·	Wimbledon Championships	· 1904 →

Frank Riseley defeated Major Ritchie 1–6, 6–3, 8–6, 13–11 in the All Comers' Final, but the reigning champion Laurence Doherty defeated Riseley 7–5, 6–3, 6–0 in the challenge round to win the gentlemen's singles tennis title at the 1903 Wimbledon Championships.

== Draw ==
=== Key ===
- Q = Qualifier
- WC = Wild card
- LL = Lucky loser
- Alt = Alternate
- SE = Special exempt
- PR = Protected ranking
- ITF = ITF entry
- JE = Junior exempt
- w/o = Walkover
- r = Retired
- d = Defaulted
- SR = Special ranking

=== Challenge round ===
Challenge Round
(United Kingdom) Frank Riseley	5	3	0
(United Kingdom) Laurence Doherty	7	6	6

=== All comers' finals ===
Quarterfinals
(United Kingdom) Brame Hillyard	1	4	4
(United Kingdom) Frank Riseley	6	6	6
(United Kingdom) Henry Pollard	2	3	1
(United Kingdom) Sydney Smith	6	6	6
(United Kingdom) George Caridia	6	6	6
(United Kingdom) Ernest Stanley Salmon	3	4	2
(United Kingdom) Major Ritchie	6	6	6
(United Kingdom) Ernest Wills	1	2	2

Semifinals
(United Kingdom) Frank Riseley	7	6	7	1	9
(United Kingdom) Sydney Smith	5	3	9	6	7
(United Kingdom) George Caridia	1	0	6	1
(United Kingdom) Major Ritchie	6	6	4	6

Final
(United Kingdom) Frank Riseley	1	6	8	13
(United Kingdom) Major Ritchie	6	3	6	11

=== Top half ===
==== Section 1 ====
First round

Second round
(United Kingdom) Brame Hillyard
(United Kingdom) Lionel Escombe	w/o
(United Kingdom) David Hawes	7	3	6	6
(United Kingdom) John Flavelle	5	6	3	0
(United Kingdom) Arthur Norris	6	6	6
(Netherlands) Thomas Vreede	0	4	0
(United Kingdom) Frank Riseley	6	6	6
(Netherlands) Broose van Groenou	0	2	0

Third round
(United Kingdom) B Hillyard	6	3	6	7
(United Kingdom) D Hawes	4	6	3	5
(United Kingdom) A Norris	2	0	3
(United Kingdom) F Riseley	6	6	6

Quarterfinals
(United Kingdom) B Hillyard	6	6	6
(United Kingdom) F Riseley	1	4	4

==== Section 2 ====
First round
(United Kingdom) Frank Donisthorpe	6	6	6
(United Kingdom) Evelyn Mellor	3	3	2
(United Kingdom) Sydney Smith	6	6	6
(United Kingdom) R Williams	1	3	1
(United Kingdom) Arthur Gore	6	6	6
(United Kingdom) FJ Barker	1	2	3
(United Kingdom) Harold Mahony	6	6	6
(United Kingdom) George Ball-Greene	2	4	3
(United Kingdom) Sydney Adams
(United Kingdom) Walter Crawley	w/o

Second round
(United Kingdom) Henry Pollard	6	6	6
(United Kingdom) LL Whiteway	1	1	4
(United Kingdom) Henry Wilson-Fox	4	6	6	4	3
(United Kingdom) F Donisthorpe	6	2	3	6	6
(United Kingdom) S Smith	6	6	6
(United Kingdom) A Gore	4	3	3
(United Kingdom) H Mahony	6	6	6
(United Kingdom) S Adams	4	4	1

Third round
(United Kingdom) H Pollard	8	6	4	7	7
(United Kingdom) F Donisthorpe	6	3	6	9	5
(United Kingdom) S Smith	6	6	7
(United Kingdom) H Mahony	3	4	5

Quarterfinals
(United Kingdom) H Pollard	6	6	6
(United Kingdom) S Smith	2	3	1

=== Bottom half ===
==== Section 3 ====
First round
(United Kingdom) George Caridia	7	6	6
(United Kingdom) HR Fussell	5	1	2
(United States) Clarence Hobart	5	6	6	6
(United Kingdom) Stanley Franklin	7	2	2	0
(United Kingdom) Frederick Payn	6	6	6
(United Kingdom) E Yatman	3	2	4
(United Kingdom) Roderick McNair	6	6	3	6
(United Kingdom) Frederick Plaskitt	3	2	6	3
(United Kingdom) Charles Simond	6	5	6	6
(United Kingdom) Percy Pinckney	3	7	4	3

Second round
(United Kingdom) G Caridia	8	6	6
(United States) C Hobart	6	2	1
(United Kingdom) F Payn	6	10	6
(United Kingdom) R McNair	3	8	2
(United Kingdom) C Simond	2	6	3	7
(United Kingdom) Albert Prebble	6	1	6	9
(United Kingdom) Ernest Salmon	6	6	6
(United Kingdom) William Martin	4	3	4

Third round
(United Kingdom) G Caridia	2	11	3	7	6
(United Kingdom) F Payn	6	9	6	5	2
(United Kingdom) A Prebble	6	3	2	3
(United Kingdom) ES Salmon	3	6	6	6

Quarterfinals
(United Kingdom) G Caridia	6	6	6
(United Kingdom) ES Salmon	3	4	2

==== Section 4 ====
First round

Second round
(United Kingdom) George Greville	6	6	6
(United Kingdom) ER Clarke	2	0	2
(United Kingdom) Major Ritchie	6	6	6
(United Kingdom) Charlie Finlason	1	2	0
(United Kingdom) GL Orme	6	6	9
(United Kingdom) Robert Hough	1	1	7
(United Kingdom) Ernest Wills	6	6	3	6
(United Kingdom) AH Greening	2	4	6	2

Third round
(United Kingdom) G Greville	5	14	3	2
(United Kingdom) M Ritchie	7	12	6	6
(United Kingdom) GL Orme	5	6	2	4
(United Kingdom) E Wills	7	1	6	6

Quarterfinals
(United Kingdom) M Ritchie	6	6	6
(United Kingdom) E Wills	1	2	2

Preceded by 1903 U.S. National Championships – Men's singles	Grand Slam men's singles	Succeeded by 1904 U.S. National Championships – Men's singles
