= 1902 Wimbledon Championships – Men's singles =

Men's singles
- 1902 Wimbledon Championships

Final
- Champion: (United Kingdom) Laurence Doherty
- Runner-up: (United Kingdom) Arthur Gore
- Score: 6–4, 6–3, 3–6, 6–0

Details
- Draw: 42
- Seeds: –

Events
Singles	men	women
Doubles	men	women
← 1901 ·	Wimbledon Championships	· 1903 →

Laurence Doherty defeated Major Ritchie 8–6, 6–3, 7–5 in the All Comers' Final, and then defeated the reigning champion Arthur Gore 6–4, 6–3, 3–6, 6–0 in the challenge round to win the gentlemen's singles tennis title at the 1902 Wimbledon Championships.

== Draw ==
=== Key ===
- Q = Qualifier
- WC = Wild card
- LL = Lucky loser
- Alt = Alternate
- ITF = ITF entry
- PR = Protected ranking
- SR = Special ranking
- SE = Special exempt
- JE = Junior exempt
- JR = Junior Accelerator Programme entrant
- CO = College Accelerator Programme entrant
- NG = Next Gen Accelerator Program entrant
- w/o = Walkover
- r = Retired
- d = Defaulted

=== Challenge round ===
Challenge Round
(United Kingdom) Laurence Doherty	6	6	3	6
(United Kingdom) Arthur Gore	4	3	6	0

=== All comers' finals ===
Quarterfinals
(United Kingdom) Major Ritchie	6	6	2	6
(United Kingdom) Alfred Crawley	2	1	6	3
(United Kingdom) Sydney Smith	6	6	6
(United Kingdom) Herbert Roper Barrett	3	4	3
(United Kingdom) George Greville	1	6	3	5
(United Kingdom) Laurence Doherty	6	4	6	7
(United Kingdom) Frederick Payn	2	2	4
(United Kingdom) Harold Mahony	6	6	6

Semifinals
(United Kingdom) Major Ritchie	6	4	6	6
(United Kingdom) Sydney Smith	4	6	4	4
(United Kingdom) Laurence Doherty	4	4	8	2
(United Kingdom) Harold Mahony	6	6	6	0^{r}

Final
(United Kingdom) Major Ritchie	6	3	5
(United Kingdom) Laurence Doherty	8	6	7

=== Top half ===
==== Section 1 ====
First round

Second round
(United Kingdom) Major Ritchie	6	6	6
(United Kingdom) Roderick McNair	3	0	1
(United Kingdom) George Hillyard	6	6	6
(United Kingdom) Evelyn Mellor	3	0	1
(United Kingdom) E Yatman
(United Kingdom) AW Andrews	w/o
(United Kingdom) Alfred Crawley	6	6	6
(United Kingdom) Arthur Norris	4	1	2

Third round
(United Kingdom) M Ritchie	5	6	0
(United Kingdom) G Hillyard	7	4	0^{r}
(United Kingdom) E Yatman	5	3	2
(United Kingdom) A Crawley	7	6	6

Quarterfinals
(United Kingdom) M Ritchie	6	6	2	6
(United Kingdom) A Crawley	2	1	6	3

==== Section 2 ====
First round
(United Kingdom) Sydney Smith	6	6	7
(United Kingdom) RM Sweetman	3	0	5
(United Kingdom) HM Sweetman	6	6	6
(United Kingdom) JB Ward	1	3	2
(United Kingdom) Herbert Roper Barrett	11	6	6
(United Kingdom) George Ball Greene	9	2	2
(United Kingdom) George Simond	6	6	3	6
(United Kingdom) ER Clarke	3	1	6	1
(United Kingdom) Allan Pearson	6	6	6
(United Kingdom) A Walker	4	0	2

Second round
(Belgium) Paul de Borman	6	7	6
(United Kingdom) Ernest Salmon	3	5	2
(United Kingdom) Henry Pollard	0	4	3
(United Kingdom) S Smith	6	6	6
(United Kingdom) HM Sweetman	6	2	1
(United Kingdom) HR Barrett	8	6	6
(United Kingdom) G Simond	6	8	7
(United Kingdom) A Pearson	1	6	5

Third round
(Belgium) P de Borman	5	4	6
(United Kingdom) S Smith	7	6	8
(United Kingdom) HR Barrett	6	6	9
(United Kingdom) G Simond	2	1	7

Quarterfinals
(United Kingdom) S Smith	6	6	6
(United Kingdom) H Barrett	3	4	3

=== Bottom half ===
==== Section 3 ====
First round
(United Kingdom) George Greville	6	6	4	6
(United Kingdom) Brame Hillyard	3	1	6	3
(United Kingdom) Walter Crawley	6	6	6
(United Kingdom) A Raleigh	0	2	0
(United Kingdom) Robert Hough
(United Kingdom) Reginald Doherty	w/o
(United Kingdom) George Caridia	6	6	6
(United Kingdom) H Whale	1	2	2
(United Kingdom) Frank Riseley	6	6	6
(United Kingdom) FW Brambeer	0	1	2

Second round
(United Kingdom) G Greville	6	6	7	4	6
(United Kingdom) W Crawley	1	2	9	6	0
(United Kingdom) R Hough	4	5	4
(United Kingdom) G Caridia	6	7	6
(United Kingdom) F Riseley	6	6	6
(United Kingdom) HL Fleming	0	0	2
(United Kingdom) Laurence Doherty
(United Kingdom) Leslie Hausburg	w/o

Third round
(United Kingdom) G Greville	6	6	6
(United Kingdom) G Caridia	4	3	0
(United Kingdom) F Riseley	4	1	3
(United Kingdom) L Doherty	6	6	6

Quarterfinals
(United Kingdom) G Greville	1	6	3	5
(United Kingdom) L Doherty	6	4	6	7

==== Section 4 ====
First round

Second round
(United Kingdom) Frederick Payn
(United Kingdom) Charles Pritchett	w/o
(Belgium) William le Maire de Warzée	6	6	6
(United Kingdom) Lionel Escombe	2	1	1
(United Kingdom) Harold Mahony	6	6	6
(United Kingdom) Sydney Adams	3	1	4
(United Kingdom) Henry Wilson-Fox	6	6	3	4	8
(United Kingdom) Ernest Wills	0	2	6	6	6

Third round
(United Kingdom) F Payn	6	6	6
(Belgium) W le Maire de Warzée	2	0	3
(United Kingdom) H Mahony	6	6	6
(United Kingdom) H Wilson-Fox	4	0	4

Quarterfinals
(United Kingdom) F Payn	6	6	6
(United Kingdom) H Mahony	2	2	4

Preceded by 1902 U.S. National Championships – Men's singles	Grand Slam men's singles	Succeeded by 1903 U.S. National Championships – Men's singles
