= 1901 Wimbledon Championships – Men's singles =

Men's singles
- 1901 Wimbledon Championships

Final
- Champion: (United Kingdom of Great Britain and Ireland) Arthur Gore
- Runner-up: (United Kingdom of Great Britain and Ireland) Reginald Doherty
- Score: 4–6, 7–5, 6–4, 6–4

Details
- Draw: 36
- Seeds: –

Events
Singles	men	women
Doubles	men	women
← 1900 ·	Wimbledon Championships	· 1902 →

Arthur Gore defeated Sydney Smith 6–4, 6–0, 6–3 in the All Comers' Final, and then defeated the reigning champion Reginald Doherty 4–6, 7–5, 6–4, 6–4 in the challenge round to win the gentlemen's singles tennis title at the 1901 Wimbledon Championships.

== Draw ==
=== Key ===
- Q = Qualifier
- WC = Wild card
- LL = Lucky loser
- Alt = Alternate
- SE = Special exempt
- PR = Protected ranking
- ITF = ITF entry
- JE = Junior exempt
- w/o = Walkover
- r = Retired
- d = Defaulted
- SR = Special ranking

=== Challenge round ===
Challenge Round
(United Kingdom) Arthur Gore	4	7	6	6
(United Kingdom) Reginald Doherty	6	5	4	4

=== All comers' finals ===
Quarterfinals
(United Kingdom) Harold Mahony	6	6	3	6
(United Kingdom) Roderick McNair	4	3	6	3
(United Kingdom) George Simond	4	5	6	3
(United Kingdom) Charles Dixon	6	7	1	6
(United Kingdom) Herbert Roper Barrett	7	6	8
(United Kingdom) Sydney Smith	5	4	6
(United Kingdom) George Hillyard	1	6	6	6	2
(United Kingdom) Arthur Gore	6	2	4	8	6

Semifinals
(United Kingdom) Harold Mahony	3	4	9
(United Kingdom) Charles Dixon	6	6	11
(United Kingdom) Herbert Roper Barrett	6	1	5
(United Kingdom) Arthur Gore	8	6	7

Final
(United Kingdom) Charles Dixon	4	0	3
(United Kingdom) Arthur Gore	6	6	6

=== Top half ===
==== Section 1 ====
First round

Second round
(United Kingdom) Harold Mahony	8	6	5	6
(United Kingdom) Allan Pearson	6	4	7	1
(United Kingdom) Clement Cazalet	6	6	6
(United Kingdom) A Raleigh	2	2	4
(United Kingdom) Roderick McNair	6	7	6
(United Kingdom) FW Brambeer	3	5	4
(United Kingdom) Gillibrand Evered	8	6	4	7
(United Kingdom) Robert Hough	6	3	6	5

Third round
(United Kingdom) H Mahony	8	2	6	6
(United Kingdom) C Cazalet	6	6	1	0
(United Kingdom) R McNair	4	6	6	6
(United Kingdom) GE Evered	6	1	1	3

Quarterfinals
(United Kingdom) H Mahony	6	6	3	6
(United Kingdom) R McNair	4	3	6	3

==== Section 2 ====
First round
(United Kingdom) David Hawes
(United Kingdom) James Crispe	w/o
(United Kingdom) Frederick Payn	6	6	6
(United Kingdom) Capt. Barton	2	2	4

Second round
(United Kingdom) George Simond	2	6	6	6
(United Kingdom) Arthur Norris	6	4	2	3
(United Kingdom) CL Nedwill	10	6	1	0	6
(United Kingdom) Walter Crawley	8	0	6	6	4
(United Kingdom) Charles Dixon	6	6	4	8
(United Kingdom) H Wilson	3	3	6	6
(United Kingdom) D Hawes	3	3	4
(United Kingdom) F Payn	6	6	6

Third round
(United Kingdom) G Simond	6	6	6
(United Kingdom) CL Nedwill	1	3	3
(United Kingdom) C Dixon	6	6	6
(United Kingdom) F Payn	3	4	4

Quarterfinals
(United Kingdom) G Simond	6	7	1	6
(United Kingdom) C Dixon	4	5	6	3

=== Bottom half ===
==== Section 3 ====
First round
(United Kingdom) Philip Pearson	8	6	6
(United Kingdom) AW Andrews	6	2	3
(United Kingdom) Herbert Roper Barrett	6	6	6
(United Kingdom) HM Sweetman	2	2	3

Second round
(United Kingdom) P Pearson	4	4	3
(United Kingdom) HR Barrett	6	6	6
(United Kingdom) Major Ritchie	3	6	6	6	6
(United Kingdom) HW Davies	6	2	8	3	3
(United Kingdom) Wilberforce Eaves	5	7	7	6
(United Kingdom) B Wood-Hill	7	5	5	1
(United Kingdom) Sydney Smith	6	6	6
(United Kingdom) Sydney Adams	2	2	0

Third round
(United Kingdom) HR Barrett	6	8	6
(United Kingdom) M Ritchie	2	6	4
(United Kingdom) W Eaves	0	2	3
(United Kingdom) S Smith	6	6	6

Quarterfinals
(United Kingdom) HR Barrett	7	6	8
(United Kingdom) S Smith	5	4	6

==== Section 4 ====
First round

Second round
(United Kingdom) Laurence Doherty	6	6	6
(United Kingdom) Ernest Wills	1	0	2
(United Kingdom) George Hillyard	6	7	6	6
(United Kingdom) George Greville	8	5	2	1
(United Kingdom) Arthur Gore	6	3	6	6
(United Kingdom) E Yatman	1	6	4	3
(New Zealand) Harry Parker	2	4	6	6	11
(United Kingdom) Brame Hillyard	6	6	1	2	9

Third round
(United Kingdom) L Doherty	6	6	1	4	3
(United Kingdom) G Hillyard	0	4	6	6	6
(United Kingdom) A Gore	6	6	3	6
(New Zealand) H Parker	1	4	6	4

Quarterfinals
(United Kingdom) G Hillyard	6	2	4	8	2
(United Kingdom) A Gore	1	6	6	6	6

Preceded by 1900 U.S. National Championships – Men's singles	Grand Slam men's singles	Succeeded by 1902 U.S. National Championships – Men's singles
