= 1897 Wimbledon Championships – Men's singles =

Men's singles
- 1897 Wimbledon Championships

Final
- Champion: (United Kingdom) Reginald Doherty
- Runner-up: (United Kingdom) Harold Mahony
- Score: 6–4, 6–4, 6–3

Details
- Draw: 31
- Seeds: –

Events
Singles	men	women
Doubles	men	women
← 1896 ·	Wimbledon Championships	· 1898 →

Reginald Doherty defeated Wilberforce Eaves 6–3, 7–5, 2–0 (retired) in the All Comers' Final, and then defeated the reigning champion Harold Mahony 6–4, 6–4, 6–3 in the challenge round to win the gentlemen's singles tennis title at the 1897 Wimbledon Championships.

== Draw ==
=== Key ===
- Q = Qualifier
- WC = Wild card
- LL = Lucky loser
- Alt = Alternate
- SE = Special exempt
- PR = Protected ranking
- ITF = ITF entry
- JE = Junior exempt
- w/o = Walkover
- r = Retired
- d = Defaulted
- SR = Special ranking

=== Challenge round ===
Challenge Round
(United Kingdom) Reginald Doherty	6	6	6
(United Kingdom) Harold Mahony	4	4	3

=== All comers' finals ===
Semifinals
(United Kingdom) Sydney Smith	2	7	6	2	1
(United Kingdom) Wilberforce Eaves	6	5	1	6	6
(United Kingdom) Wilfred Baddeley	3	0	3
(United Kingdom) Reginald Doherty	6	6	6

Final
(United Kingdom) Wilberforce Eaves	3	5	0^{r}
(United Kingdom) Reginald Doherty	6	7	2

=== Top half ===
First round
(United Kingdom) Clement Cazalet	6	6	10
(United Kingdom) SC Atkey	2	2	8
(United Kingdom) Sydney Smith	7	8	6
(United Kingdom) Arthur Hallward	5	6	3
(United Kingdom) George Hillyard
(United Kingdom) W Wallace	w/o
(United Kingdom) Alfred Taylor	6	6	3	3	6
(United Kingdom) Gillibrand Evered	1	3	6	6	4
(United Kingdom) George Greville	6	6	6
(United Kingdom) Arthur Norris	2	2	1
(United Kingdom) JJ Stone	5	2	3
(United Kingdom) Arthur Gore	7	6	6
(United Kingdom) Wilberforce Eaves	6	6	6
(United Kingdom) R Sheldon	3	3	2
(United Kingdom) Arthur Riseley	6	6	6
(United Kingdom) Frederick Plaskitt	0	2	4

Second round
(United Kingdom) C Cazalet	6	6	2	2	1
(United Kingdom) S Smith	4	3	6	6	6
(United Kingdom) G Hillyard	6	6	6
(United Kingdom) A Taylor	2	2	1
(United Kingdom) G Greville
(United Kingdom) A Gore	w/o
(United Kingdom) W Eaves	8	6	6	6
(United Kingdom) A Riseley	10	3	1	4

Quarterfinals
(United Kingdom) S Smith	3	6	6	6
(United Kingdom) G Hillyard	6	4	2	4
(United Kingdom) G Greville	1	2	10	0
(United Kingdom) W Eaves	6	6	8	6

Semifinals
(United Kingdom) S Smith	2	7	6	2	1
(United Kingdom) W Eaves	6	5	1	6	6

=== Bottom half ===
First round
(United Kingdom) Harold Nisbet	6	6	7	6
(United Kingdom) Robert Hough	3	2	9	3
(United Kingdom) Wilfred Baddeley
(United Kingdom) David Hawes	w/o
(United Kingdom) Alfred Crawley
(United Kingdom) Archdale Palmer	w/o
(United Kingdom) Laurence Doherty	6	6	8
(United Kingdom) Herbert Baddeley	4	4	6
(United Kingdom) Reginald Doherty	11	1	6	6
(United Kingdom) George Simond	9	6	4	3
(United Kingdom) FSM Bates	4	3	5
(United Kingdom) Oswald Milne	6	6	7
(United Kingdom) Frank Riseley
(United Kingdom) Manliffe Goodbody	w/o

Second round
(United Kingdom) H Nisbet	2	2	5
(United Kingdom) W Baddeley	6	6	7
(United Kingdom) A Crawley	0	2	5
(United Kingdom) L Doherty	6	6	7
(United Kingdom) R Doherty	6	6	9
(United Kingdom) O Milne	2	1	7
(United Kingdom) F Riseley	6	6	6
(United Kingdom) Major Ritchie	3	2	1

Quarterfinals
(United Kingdom) W Baddeley	6	6	6
(United Kingdom) L Doherty	4	2	2
(United Kingdom) R Doherty
(United Kingdom) F Riseley	w/o

Semifinals
(United Kingdom) W Baddeley	3	0	3
(United Kingdom) R Doherty	6	6	6

Preceded by 1896 U.S. National Championships – Men's singles	Grand Slam men's singles	Succeeded by 1898 U.S. National Championships – Men's singles
