= 1906 Wimbledon Championships – Men's singles =

Men's singles
- 1906 Wimbledon Championships

Final
- Champion: (United Kingdom) Laurence Doherty
- Runner-up: (United Kingdom) Frank Riseley
- Score: 6–4, 4–6, 6–2, 6–3

Details
- Draw: 69
- Seeds: –

Events
Singles	men	women
Doubles	men	women
← 1905 ·	Wimbledon Championships	· 1907 →

Reigning champion Laurence Doherty defeated Frank Riseley 6–4, 4–6, 6–2, 6–3 in the challenge round to win the gentlemen's singles tennis title at the 1906 Wimbledon Championships. Riseley had defeated Arthur Gore in the All Comers' Final.

== Draw ==
=== Key ===
- Q = Qualifier
- WC = Wild card
- LL = Lucky loser
- Alt = Alternate
- SE = Special exempt
- PR = Protected ranking
- ITF = ITF entry
- JE = Junior exempt
- w/o = Walkover
- r = Retired
- d = Defaulted
- SR = Special ranking

=== Challenge round ===
Challenge Round
(United Kingdom) Frank Riseley	4	6	2	3
(United Kingdom) Laurence Doherty	6	4	6	6

=== All comers' finals ===
Quarterfinals
(New Zealand) Anthony Wilding	6	6	4	3	6
(United Kingdom) Major Ritchie	4	1	6	6	2
(United Kingdom) Arthur Gore	6	6	8
(United Kingdom) Alfred Crawley	0	1	6
(United States) Raymond Little	3	1	4
(United Kingdom) Frank Riseley	6	6	6
(United Kingdom) Sydney Smith	6	4	7	0
(United Kingdom) Clement Cazalet	2	6	5	0^{r}

Semifinals
(New Zealand) Anthony Wilding	7	1	6
(United Kingdom) Arthur Gore	9	6	8
(United Kingdom) Frank Riseley	8	2	6	6
(United Kingdom) Sydney Smith	6	6	2	4

Final
(United Kingdom) Arthur Gore	3	3	4
(United Kingdom) Frank Riseley	6	6	6

=== Top half ===
==== Section 1 ====
First round

Second round
(United Kingdom) Peter Hicks	3	7	4	9	6
(United Kingdom) Leslie Powell	6	5	6	7	1
(United Kingdom) Alfred Beamish	6	6	6
(United Kingdom) WP Groser	2	3	4
(United Kingdom) Robert Hough
(Germany) RF Kalberer	w/o
(New Zealand) Anthony Wilding	6	6	6
(United Kingdom) HJW Fosbery	1	0	1

Third round
(United Kingdom) P Hicks	3	4	5
(United Kingdom) A Beamish	6	6	7
(United Kingdom) R Hough	0	3	2
(New Zealand) A Wilding	6	6	6

Fourth round
(United Kingdom) A Beamish	1	3	4
(New Zealand) A Wilding	6	6	6

==== Section 2 ====
First round

Second round
(United Kingdom) AL Bentley	7	6	6
(United Kingdom) Roderick McNair	5	1	4
(United Kingdom) Major Ritchie	6	6	6
(United Kingdom) Alfred Taylor	1	4	0
(Germany) Carl Zenger
(United Kingdom) George Caridia	w/o
(United Kingdom) Albert Prebble	6	6	6
(United Kingdom) Arthur Lowe	2	4	4

Third round
(United Kingdom) AL Bentley	0	1	2
(United Kingdom) M Ritchie	6	6	6
(Germany) C Zenger	0	1	1
(United Kingdom) A Prebble	6	6	6

Fourth round
(United Kingdom) M Ritchie	6	6	6
(United Kingdom) A Prebble	2	1	3

==== Section 3 ====
First round

Second round
(United Kingdom) EW Timmis	7	1	6	6
(United Kingdom) ER Clarke	5	6	3	2
(United Kingdom) Lionel Escombe	6	6	6
(United Kingdom) GL Orme	2	2	4
(United Kingdom) Arthur Gore	6	6	6
(United Kingdom) JB Ward	1	2	1
(United Kingdom) George Ball-Greene
(United Kingdom) George Thomas	w/o

Third round
(United Kingdom) EW Timmis	1	7	2
(United Kingdom) L Escombe	6	9	6
(United Kingdom) A Gore	6	7	6
(United Kingdom) G Ball-Greene	4	5	3

Fourth round
(United Kingdom) L Escombe	6	4	6	3
(United Kingdom) A Gore	8	6	1	6

==== Section 4 ====
First round
(United Kingdom) Theodore Mavrogordato
(Germany) L Kulenkampff	w/o
(United Kingdom) Kenneth Ingram
(United Kingdom) Wilberforce Eaves	w/o
(United Kingdom) Cecil Hartley	7	6	3	6
(United Kingdom) Eustace White	5	2	6	1

Second round
(United Kingdom) Fritz Goldberg	6	6	9
(United Kingdom) WE Lane	1	4	7
(United Kingdom) Gordon Lowe	6	6	6
(United Kingdom) Charles Gouldesborough	0	2	3
(United Kingdom) Alfred Crawley	4	6	6	6
(United Kingdom) T Mavrogordato	6	4	3	3
(United Kingdom) K Ingram	4	2	6	6	4
(United Kingdom) C Hartley	6	6	2	4	6

Third round
(United Kingdom) F Goldberg	6	6	6
(United Kingdom) G Lowe	4	1	2
(United Kingdom) A Crawley	6	6	6
(United Kingdom) C Hartley	2	4	0

Fourth round
(United Kingdom) F Goldberg	5	1	0
(United Kingdom) A Crawley	7	6	6

=== Bottom half ===
==== Section 5 ====
First round
(United States) Raymond Little	6	6	6
(United Kingdom) AR Sawyer	1	2	1
(United Kingdom) PJG Pipon	4	6	7	4	9
(United Kingdom) DH Rutherglen	6	3	5	6	7

Second round
(United States) R Little	6	6	7
(United Kingdom) PJG Pipon	1	4	5
(United Kingdom) SF Card
(United Kingdom) Dudley Larcombe	w/o
(United Kingdom) JK Frost
(United Kingdom) E Warnant	w/o
(United Kingdom) TD Stoward	6	6	6
(United Kingdom) E Morris Hall	0	2	0

Third round
(United States) R Little
(United Kingdom) SF Card	w/o
(United Kingdom) JK Frost	2	3	1
(United Kingdom) TD Stoward	6	6	6

Fourth round
(United States) R Little	6	8	6
(United Kingdom) TD Stoward	0	6	4

==== Section 6 ====
First round

Second round
(United States) Kreigh Collins	6	6	6
(United States) ER Paterson	1	1	2
(United Kingdom) Kenneth Powell	4	8	6	6
(United Kingdom) Charles Simond	6	6	3	1
(United Kingdom) Frank Riseley	6	6	6
(United Kingdom) JS Talbot	0	1	1
(Germany) Heinrich Schomburgk
(United Kingdom) George Hillyard	w/o

Third round
(United States) K Collins	4	6	4	6	2
(United Kingdom) K Powell	6	3	6	4	6
(United Kingdom) F Riseley	6	6	6
(Germany) H Schomburgk	1	2	0

Fourth round
(United Kingdom) K Powell	1	2	2
(United Kingdom) F Riseley	6	6	6

==== Section 7 ====
First round

Second round
(United Kingdom) John Flavelle	6	6	6
(United Kingdom) Hugh Comyn	0	1	3
(United Kingdom) George Simond	6	6	6
(United Kingdom) Nigel Davidson	3	1	3
(United Kingdom) Sydney Smith	6	6	6
(United Kingdom) David Hawes	2	1	2
(United Kingdom) Thomas Haydon
(United Kingdom) Henry Pollard	w/o

Third round
(United Kingdom) J Flavelle	6	6	7
(United Kingdom) G Simond	2	4	5
(United Kingdom) S Smith	6	6	6
(United Kingdom) T Haydon	1	1	2

Fourth round
(United Kingdom) J Flavelle	0	1	4
(United Kingdom) S Smith	6	6	6

==== Section 8 ====
First round

Second round
(United Kingdom) Sydney Adams	3	6	6	3	6
(United Kingdom) Evan Gwynne-Evans	6	4	3	6	4
(United Kingdom) Clement Cazalet	6	6	6
(United Kingdom) WJ Lancaster	4	2	3
(United Kingdom) Ernest Wills	6	6	6
(United Kingdom) Frank Pearce	2	3	0
(United Kingdom) EL Bristow	7	6	3
(United Kingdom) Stanley Franklin	5	3	0^{r}

Third round
(United Kingdom) S Adams	4	5	4
(United Kingdom) C Cazalet	6	7	6
(United Kingdom) E Wills	6	6	10	0^{r}
(United Kingdom) EL Bristow	4	3	12	0

Fourth round
(United Kingdom) C Cazalet	6	6	3	4	6
(United Kingdom) EL Bristow	2	3	6	6	2

Preceded by 1905 Australasian Championships – Men's singles	Grand Slam men's singles	Succeeded by 1906 U.S. National Championships – Men's singles
