= 1898 Wimbledon Championships – Men's singles =

Men's singles
- 1898 Wimbledon Championships

Final
- Champion: (United Kingdom) Reginald Doherty
- Runner-up: (United Kingdom) Laurence Doherty
- Score: 6–3, 6–3, 2–6, 5–7, 6–1

Details
- Draw: 37
- Seeds: –

Events
Singles	men	women
Doubles	men	women
← 1897 ·	Wimbledon Championships	· 1899 →

Laurence Doherty defeated Harold Mahony 6–1, 6–2, 4–6, 2–6, 14–12 in the All Comers Final, but the reigning champion Reginald Doherty defeated Laurence Doherty 6–3, 6–3, 2–6, 5–7, 6–1 in the challenge round to win the gentlemen's singles tennis title at the 1898 Wimbledon Championships.

== Draw ==
=== Key ===
- Q = Qualifier
- WC = Wild card
- LL = Lucky loser
- Alt = Alternate
- SE = Special exempt
- PR = Protected ranking
- ITF = ITF entry
- JE = Junior exempt
- w/o = Walkover
- r = Retired
- d = Defaulted
- SR = Special ranking

=== Challenge round ===
Challenge Round
(United Kingdom) Laurence Doherty	3	3	6	7	1
(United Kingdom) Reginald Doherty	6	6	2	5	6

=== All comers' finals ===
Quarterfinals
(United Kingdom) Major Ritchie	2	6	3	2
(United States) Clarence Hobart	6	3	6	6
(United Kingdom) Laurence Doherty	6	6	3	6
(United Kingdom) John Flavelle	2	3	6	0
(United Kingdom) Arthur Gore	4	6	4	6	7
(United Kingdom) Sydney Smith	6	0	6	3	5
(United Kingdom) Harold Mahony	6	6	6
(United Kingdom) George Simond	2	4	4

Semifinals
(United States) Clarence Hobart	1	4	3
(United Kingdom) Laurence Doherty	6	6	6
(United Kingdom) Arthur Gore	2	6	6	2	4
(United Kingdom) Harold Mahony	6	3	4	6	6

Final
(United Kingdom) Laurence Doherty	6	6	4	2	14
(United Kingdom) Harold Mahony	1	2	6	6	12

=== Top half ===
==== Section 1 ====
First round

Second round
(United Kingdom) Major Ritchie	2	6	6	8	6
(United Kingdom) Harry Barlow	6	2	8	6	1
(United Kingdom) J Johnstone	5	0	5
(United Kingdom) Robert Hough	7	6	7
(United States) Clarence Hobart	9	6	6
(United Kingdom) Gillibrand Evered	7	1	3
(United Kingdom) Frederick Payn	3	6	6	3	6
(United Kingdom) LT Ball	6	4	4	6	4

Third round
(United Kingdom) M Ritchie	6	6	7
(United Kingdom) R Hough	1	4	5
(United States) C Hobart	6	4	6	6
(United Kingdom) F Payn	1	6	3	3

Quarterfinals
(United Kingdom) M Ritchie	2	6	3	2
(United States) C Hobart	6	3	6	6

==== Section 2 ====
First round
(United Kingdom) Allan Pearson	1	6	6	6
(United Kingdom) JH Hechle	6	0	0	4
(United Kingdom) MRL White	7	1	6	6
(United Kingdom) Arthur Norris	5	6	0	0
(United Kingdom) E Stanley	7	6	6
(United Kingdom) Alexander Mackay	5	2	4

Second round
(United Kingdom) Herbert Roper Barrett	4	6	3	6	9
(United Kingdom) George Caridia	6	2	6	4	7
(United Kingdom) Laurence Doherty	6	6	6
(United Kingdom) George Hillyard	1	3	1
(United Kingdom) John Flavelle	6	4	6	6
(United Kingdom) A Pearson	3	6	4	3
(United Kingdom) MRL White	3	6	6	4	6
(United Kingdom) E Stanley	6	4	3	6	2

Third round
(United Kingdom) HR Barrett	1	4	1
(United Kingdom) L Doherty	6	6	6
(United Kingdom) J Flavelle	7	6	6	6
(United Kingdom) MRL White	9	4	1	4

Quarterfinals
(United Kingdom) L Doherty	6	6	3	6
(United Kingdom) J Flavelle	2	3	6	0

=== Bottom half ===
==== Section 3 ====
First round
(United Kingdom) Arthur Gore
(United Kingdom) John Boucher	w/o
(United Kingdom) Harold Nisbet	7	6	8
(United Kingdom) Frederick Plaskitt	5	4	6

Second round
(United Kingdom) A Gore	9	0	6	6
(United Kingdom) H Nisbet	7	6	1	4
(United Kingdom) George Greville	6	6	6
(United States) Wylie Grant	1	0	1
(United Kingdom) Sydney Smith
(United Kingdom) Wilberforce Eaves	w/o
(United Kingdom) David Hawes	6	4	12	7
(United Kingdom) George Mewburn	3	6	10	5

Third round
(United Kingdom) A Gore	4	6	8	12
(United Kingdom) G Greville	6	4	6	10
(United Kingdom) S Smith	6	6	6
(United Kingdom) D Hawes	1	2	2

Quarterfinals
(United Kingdom) A Gore	4	6	4	6	7
(United Kingdom) S Smith	6	0	6	3	5

==== Section 4 ====
First round

Second round
(United Kingdom) Harold Mahony	6	6	6
(United Kingdom) S Baddeley	3	3	2
(United Kingdom) Philip Pearson	6	6	6
(United Kingdom) RF Leslie	1	2	1
(United Kingdom) Oswald Milne
(United Kingdom) Horace Chapman	w/o
(United Kingdom) George Simond	9	3	6	12
(United States) Jahial Parmly Paret	7	6	3	10

Third round
(United Kingdom) H Mahony	6	6	6	6
(United Kingdom) P Pearson	4	3	8	1
(United Kingdom) O Milne	2	4	1
(United Kingdom) G Simond	6	6	6

Quarterfinals
(United Kingdom) H Mahony	6	6	6
(United Kingdom) G Simond	2	4	4

Preceded by 1897 U.S. National Championships – Men's singles	Grand Slam men's singles	Succeeded by 1899 U.S. National Championships – Men's singles
