= 1899 Wimbledon Championships – Men's singles =

Men's singles
- 1899 Wimbledon Championships

Final
- Champion: (United Kingdom) Reginald Doherty
- Runner-up: (United Kingdom) Arthur Gore
- Score: 1–6, 4–6, 6–3, 6–3, 6–3

Details
- Draw: 37
- Seeds: –

Events
Singles	men	women
Doubles	men	women
← 1898 ·	Wimbledon Championships	· 1900 →

Arthur Gore defeated Sydney Smith 3–6, 6–1, 6–2, 6–4 in the All Comers' Final, but the reigning champion Reginald Doherty defeated Gore 1–6, 4–6, 6–3, 6–3, 6–3 in the challenge round to win the gentlemen's singles tennis title at the 1899 Wimbledon Championships.

== Draw ==
=== Key ===
- Q = Qualifier
- WC = Wild card
- LL = Lucky loser
- Alt = Alternate
- SE = Special exempt
- PR = Protected ranking
- ITF = ITF entry
- JE = Junior exempt
- w/o = Walkover
- r = Retired
- d = Defaulted
- SR = Special ranking

=== Challenge round ===
Challenge Round
(United Kingdom) Arthur Gore	6	6	3	3	3
(United Kingdom) Reginald Doherty	1	4	6	6	6

=== All comers' finals ===
Quarterfinals
(United Kingdom) Philip Pearson	3	2	7
(United Kingdom) Arthur Gore	6	6	9
(United Kingdom) George Greville	3	7	6	8
(United Kingdom) Harold Mahony	6	9	2	10
(United Kingdom) Harold Nisbet	3	5	4
(United Kingdom) Sydney Smith	6	7	6
(United States) Clarence Hobart	6	5	4
(United Kingdom) Herbert Roper Barrett	8	7	6

Semifinals
(United Kingdom) Arthur Gore	6	4	3	7	6
(United Kingdom) Harold Mahony	3	6	6	5	1
(United Kingdom) Sydney Smith	2	11	4	8	8
(United Kingdom) Herbert Roper Barrett	6	9	6	6	6

Final
(United Kingdom) Arthur Gore	3	6	6	6
(United Kingdom) Sydney Smith	6	1	2	4

=== Top half ===
==== Section 1 ====
First round

Second round
(United Kingdom) Philip Pearson	6	6	6
(United Kingdom) Frederick Plaskitt	1	0	3
(United Kingdom) Major Ritchie	6	3	6	4	6
(United Kingdom) Wilberforce Eaves	4	6	4	6	4
(United Kingdom) Arthur Gore	8	6	6
(United Kingdom) Ambrose Dudley	6	2	3
(United Kingdom) SVR Drapes	2	4	1
(United Kingdom) George Caridia	6	6	6

Third round
(United Kingdom) P Pearson	6	6	6
(United Kingdom) M Ritchie	3	2	4
(United Kingdom) A Gore	6	6	6
(United Kingdom) G Caridia	2	1	4

Quarterfinals
(United Kingdom) P Pearson	3	2	7
(United Kingdom) A Gore	6	6	9

==== Section 2 ====
First round
(United Kingdom) George Simond
(United Kingdom) Clement Cazalet	w/o
(United Kingdom) Harold Mahony
(United Kingdom) William Doherty	w/o
(United Kingdom) David Hawes	7	6	5	6
(United Kingdom) Frederick Payn	5	0	7	3

Second round
(United Kingdom) George Hillyard	w/o
(United Kingdom) George Greville
(United Kingdom) MRL White	5	7	6	6
(United Kingdom) Archibald McNair	7	5	4	1
(United Kingdom) Alexander Mackay	1	0	1
(United Kingdom) G Simond	6	6	6
(United Kingdom) H Mahony	6	7	6
(United Kingdom) D Hawes	3	5	2

Third round
(United Kingdom) G Greville	6	6	6
(United Kingdom) MRL White	0	3	2
(United Kingdom) G Simond	2	6	6	2
(United Kingdom) H Mahony	6	4	8	6

Quarterfinals
(United Kingdom) G Greville	3	7	6	8
(United Kingdom) H Mahony	6	9	2	10

=== Bottom half ===
==== Section 3 ====
First round
(United Kingdom) Harold Nisbet	6	6	6
(United Kingdom) J Johnstone	0	3	1
(United Kingdom) Roy Allen	6	7	7
(United Kingdom) Nelson Wright	4	5	5

Second round
(United Kingdom) H Nisbet	6	6	6
(United Kingdom) R Allen	3	4	0
(United Kingdom) Maurice Day	1	2	6	6	6
(United Kingdom) Allan Pearson	6	6	3	4	1
(United Kingdom) John Flavelle
(United Kingdom) Roderick McNair	w/o
(United Kingdom) Sydney Smith	6	6	6
(United Kingdom) E Reynolds	1	1	1

Third round
(United Kingdom) H Nisbet	6	6	6
(United Kingdom) M Day	4	3	3
(United Kingdom) J Flavelle	6	6	1	5	2
(United Kingdom) S Smith	4	4	6	7	6

Quarterfinals
(United Kingdom) H Nisbet	3	5	4
(United Kingdom) S Smith	6	7	6

==== Section 4 ====
First round

Second round
(United Kingdom) James Crispe	6	6	6
(United Kingdom) B Wood-Hill	3	3	1
(United States) Clarence Hobart	6	6	4	6
(United Kingdom) Charles Dixon	3	1	6	2
(United Kingdom) Oswald Milne	4	10	3	8
(United Kingdom) Robert Hough	6	8	6	10
(United Kingdom) Charles Allen	0	0	0
(United Kingdom) Herbert Roper Barrett	6	6	6

Third round
(United Kingdom) J Crispe	3	6	7	3
(United States) C Hobart	6	2	9	6
(United Kingdom) R Hough	1	3	3
(United Kingdom) HR Barrett	6	6	6

Quarterfinals
(United States) C Hobart	6	5	4
(United Kingdom) HR Barrett	8	7	6

Preceded by 1898 U.S. National Championships – Men's singles	Grand Slam men's singles	Succeeded by 1900 U.S. National Championships – Men's singles
