= 1906 Wimbledon Championships =

- Date: 25 June – 5 July
- Edition: 30th
- Category: Grand Slam
- Surface: Grass
- Location: Worple Road; SW19, Wimbledon, London, United Kingdom
- Venue: All England Lawn Tennis and Croquet Club

Champions

Men's singles
- (United Kingdom of Great Britain and Ireland) Laurence Doherty

Women's singles
- (United Kingdom of Great Britain and Ireland) Dorothea Douglass

Men's doubles
- (United Kingdom of Great Britain and Ireland) Frank Riseley / (United Kingdom of Great Britain and Ireland) Sydney Smith
- Wimbledon Championships

The 1906 Wimbledon Championships took place on the outdoor grass courts at the All England Lawn Tennis and Croquet Club in Wimbledon, London, United Kingdom. The tournament ran from 25 June until 5 July. It was the 30th staging of the Wimbledon Championships, and the first Grand Slam tennis event of 1906.

== Champions ==
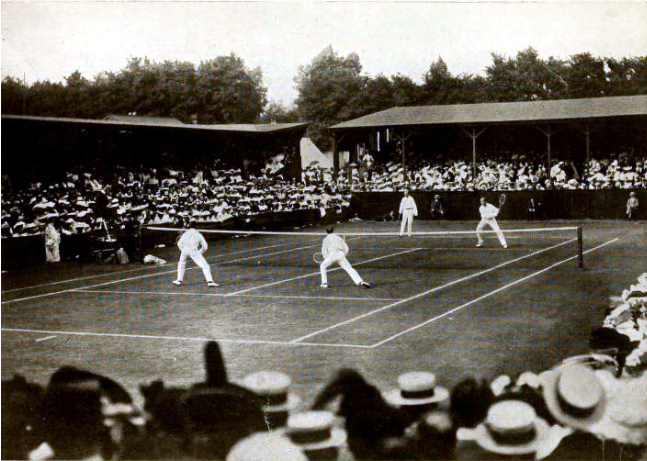
Wimbledon 1906, Men's doubles final

=== Men's singles ===
(United Kingdom of Great Britain and Ireland) Laurence Doherty defeated (United Kingdom of Great Britain and Ireland) Frank Riseley, 6–4, 4–6, 6–2, 6–3

=== Women's singles ===
(United Kingdom of Great Britain and Ireland) Dorothea Douglass defeated (United States) May Sutton, 6–3, 9–7

=== Men's doubles ===
(United Kingdom of Great Britain and Ireland) Frank Riseley / (United Kingdom of Great Britain and Ireland) Sydney Smith defeated (United Kingdom of Great Britain and Ireland) Laurence Doherty / (United Kingdom of Great Britain and Ireland) Reginald Doherty, 6–8, 6–4, 5–7, 6–3, 6–3

| Preceded by 1905 Australasian Championships | Grand Slams | Succeeded by 1906 U.S. National Championships |
