= John Flavelle =

British tennis player

- Full name: Dr. John Mason Flavelle
- Country (sports): United Kingdom
- Born: 1863 Kensington, London, United Kingdom
- Died: 1 December 1947 (aged 84) Hampstead, London, United Kingdom
- Turned pro: 1891 (amateur tour)
- Retired: 1924

Grand Slam singles results
- Wimbledon: QF (1895, 1898)

John Flavelle (1863–1947) was a British tennis player with a long career.

Flavelle was a medical doctor. He was married to fellow player Helen Reckitt. According to A. Wallis Myers, John Flavelle travelled all over the world playing and watching tennis (which was unusual in that era). Of Flavelle's style of play, A. Wallis Myers (in his book Lawn Tennis At Home and Abroad in 1903) said "He is essentially a baseline player and, volleying only on the rarest of occasions and with a somewhat indifferent service, relies almost entirely on a low forehand drive on which he gets a lot of top." At his first Wimbledon in 1895, Flavelle lost in the quarter finals to Ernest Meers. At Wimbledon 1898 he lost in the quarterfinals to Laurence Doherty, though he did win a set. Flavelle reached the Wimbledon last 16 in 1906 (beating George Simond before losing to Sydney Smith). In his last appearance aged 57 in 1920, Flavelle lost easily in round one to Bill Johnston. Flavelle was runner up in several important tournaments: the German Open in 1902 (Challenge Round to Max Decugis) and 1903 (all comer's final to Major Ritchie), the French Covered Court Championships in 1905 (to Ritchie) and Queen's in 1906 (losing to Ritchie).
