= 1902 Wimbledon Championships =

- Date: 23 June – 2 July
- Edition: 26th
- Category: Grand Slam
- Surface: Grass
- Location: Worple Road; SW19, Wimbledon, London, United Kingdom
- Venue: All England Lawn Tennis and Croquet Club

Champions

Men's singles
- (United Kingdom of Great Britain and Ireland) Laurence Doherty

Women's singles
- (United Kingdom of Great Britain and Ireland) Muriel Robb

Men's doubles
- (United Kingdom of Great Britain and Ireland) Frank Riseley / (United Kingdom of Great Britain and Ireland) Sydney Smith
- Wimbledon Championships

The 1902 Wimbledon Championships took place on the outdoor grass courts at the All England Lawn Tennis and Croquet Club in Wimbledon, London, United Kingdom. The tournament ran from 23 June until 2 July 1902. It was the 26th staging of the Wimbledon Championships, and the first Grand Slam event of 1902. The women's final (challenge round) is the only match in the history of Wimbledon that was played twice over. Charlotte Cooper Sterry played Muriel Robb in miserable weather conditions on Tuesday, 1 July and the match was abandoned with the score at one set all, 6–4, 11–13. The match was restarted afresh the next day, and Muriel Robb won the rematch 7–5, 6–1.

It was the first edition of the Wimbledon Championships in which all the matches where played with tennis balls manufactured by Slazenger, initiating one of the oldest enduring sponsorship deals in sport, that continues until today.

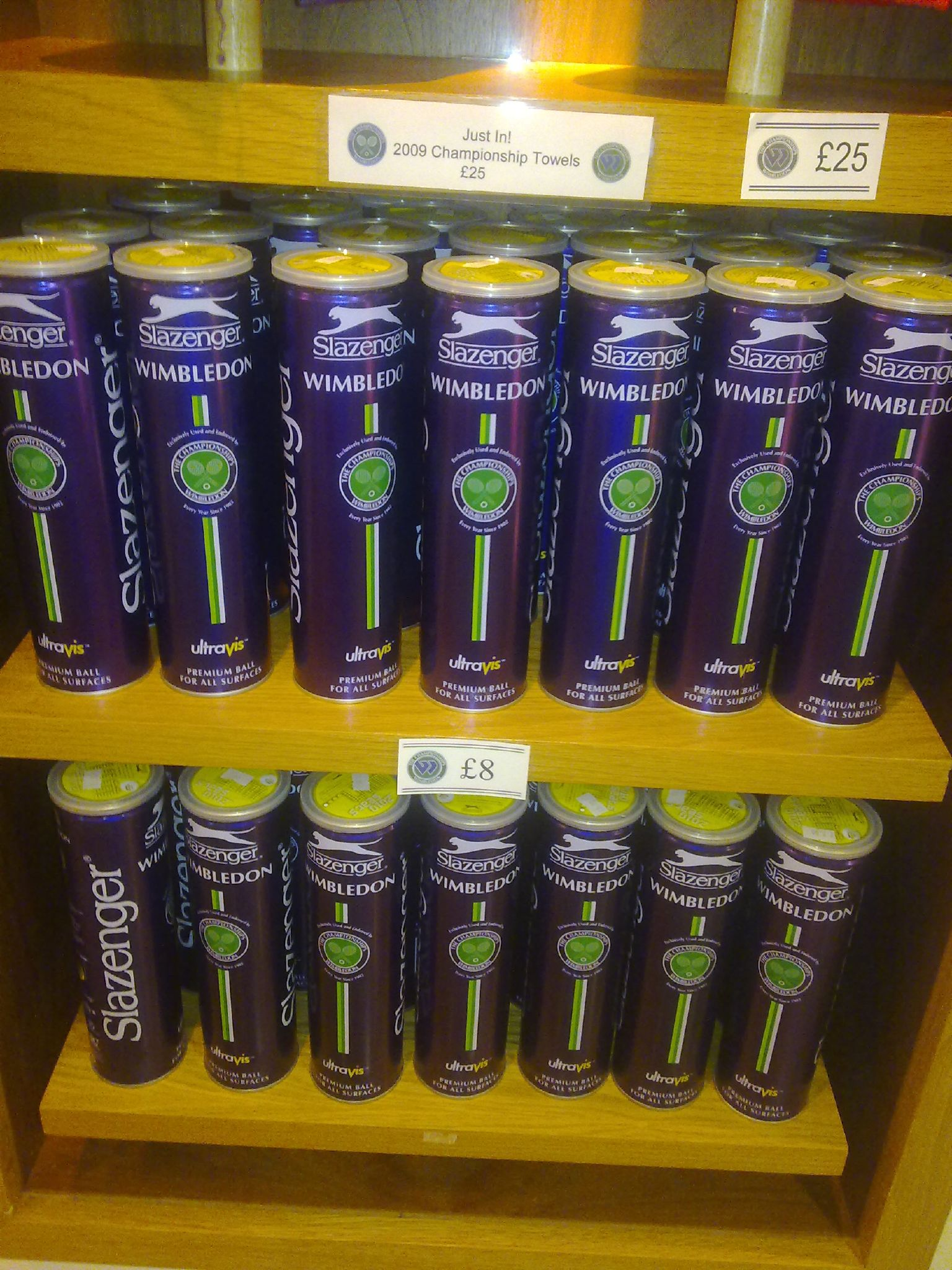
Tubes of Wimbledon tennis balls manufactured by Slazenger

== Champions ==
=== Men's singles ===
(United Kingdom of Great Britain and Ireland) Laurence Doherty defeated (United Kingdom of Great Britain and Ireland) Arthur Gore 6–4, 6–3, 3–6, 6–0

=== Women's singles ===
(United Kingdom of Great Britain and Ireland) Muriel Robb defeated (United Kingdom of Great Britain and Ireland) Charlotte Sterry 7–5, 6–1

=== Men's doubles ===
(United Kingdom of Great Britain and Ireland) Frank Riseley / (United Kingdom of Great Britain and Ireland) Sydney Smith defeated (United Kingdom of Great Britain and Ireland) Laurence Doherty / (United Kingdom of Great Britain and Ireland) Reginald Doherty 4–6, 8–6, 6–3, 4–6, 11–9

Preceded by 1901 U.S. National Championships	Grand Slams	Succeeded by 1902 U.S. National Championships
