= Gordon Forbes =

Gordon Forbes may refer to:

- Gordon Forbes (British Army officer) (1738–1797), British Army general
- Gordon Forbes (politician) (1920–2003), American lawyer and politician
- Gordon Forbes (tennis) (1934–2020), South African tennis player and author
- Gordon Forbes (figure skater) (born c. 1959), Canadian figure skater
