= Ernest Crawley =

Ball game expert

Alfred Crawley
- Full name: Alfred Ernest Crawley
- Country (sports): England
- Born: 11 July 1867; Lincoln, Lincolnshire, England
- Died: 21 October 1924 (aged 57); London, England

Singles

Grand Slam singles results
- Wimbledon: QF (1902, 1906)

Doubles

Grand Slam doubles results
- Wimbledon: 1R (1897, 1902)

Alfred Ernest Crawley (11 July 1867 – 21 October 1924) was an English schoolmaster, sexologist, anthropologist, sports journalist and exponent of ball games.

== Biography ==
Ernest Crawley was born in Lincoln, Lincolnshire, the eldest child of Rev. Samuel Crawley, rector of Oddington, Oxfordshire. He was the elder brother of the Olympic lawn tennis player Walter Crawley. He was educated at Sedbergh School and Emmanuel College, Cambridge, where he graduated BA in classics in 1890. He became an assistant master for seven years at St John's School, Leatherhead, before teaching at Lancing College from 1898 to 1901 and at Bradfield School from 1901 to 1905. From 1905 until the Lent Term of 1906 he taught the Sixth Form at Abingdon School. In 1906 he became headmaster of Derby School, though he resigned in December 1908 and took up journalism. In 1913, he resigned from being a clergyman under the terms of the Clerical Disabilities Act 1870 (33 & 34 Vict. c. 91).

Crawley reached the quarterfinals of Wimbledon in 1902 and 1906. He also reached the quarterfinals of Queens in 1913. Though lawn tennis was Crawley's favourite sport, "he was also fond of golf, figure-skating, fives, and revolver shooting". His Book of the Ball (1914) compared several games, trying to discover and illustrate general principles governing the behaviour of the ball. Crawley wrote on sport for publications including The Observer, The Times, and Fry's Magazine.

Crawley's best-known anthropological book, The Mystic Rose (1902), dealt with the anthropology of marriage. He emphasised the importance of marriage ceremonies, explaining sexual and marriage custom with reference to taboo. He contributed to the Encyclopaedia of Religion and Ethics on a range of anthropological topics: 'Anointing', 'Chastity', 'Cursing and Blessing', 'Dress', 'Drinks, Drinking', 'Fire', 'Fire-Gods', 'Food', 'Kissing', 'Life and Death (Primitive)', 'Oath (Introductory and Primitive)', 'Obscenity', 'Ordeal (Introductory and Primitive)', 'Orgy', and 'Processions and Dances'. He was a Fellow of the Royal Anthropological Institute and the Sociological Society.

Crawley died on 21 October 1924 in Kensington.

== Works ==
- 'Branchos', Folk-Lore, Vol. 6, No. 2 (June 1895), pp. 267–69
- 'Achilles at Skyros', The Classical Review, Vol. 7 No. 6 (June 1893), pp. 243–45
- 'Sexual Taboo: a study in the relations of the sexes', Journal of the Anthropological Institute, Vol. 24 (1895), pp. 116–25
- 'Sexual Taboo: a study in the relations of the sexes (Part II)', Journal of the Anthropological Institute, Vol. 24 (1895), pp. 219–35
- 'Sexual Taboo: a study in the relations of the sexes (Part III)', Journal of the Anthropological Institute, Vol. 24 (1895), pp. 430–446
- 'Taboos of Commensality', Folk-Lore
- The mystic rose: a study of primitive marriage, 1902.
  - Revised and enlarged ed., 2 vols, 1927. Ed. by Theodore Besterman.
- Translation into Greek for multilingual private printing of Rubáiyát of Omar Khayyám, the astronomer-poet of Persia, English tr. by Edward Fitzgerald, privately printed on hand-made paper / Japanese vellum, 1902
- The tree of life: a study of religion, 1905
- 'The origin and function of religion', in Sociological Society, ed., Sociological Papers, Vol. 3, 1906, pp. 243–278, Excerpts online here.
- 'Exogamy and the Mating of Cousins', in Anthropological Essays presented to E. B. Tylor, 1907, pp.52–68
- The idea of the soul, 1909
- Review of The Threshold of Religion by R. R. Marett, Man, Vol. 9 (1909). pp. 140–41
- 'Primitive eugenics', The Eugenics Review, Jan. 1910, pp. 275–80. Reprinted online here.
- 'Totemism Unveiled', Nature 84 (1910), pp. 31–2
- Book of the ball, 1913
- Lawn tennis, 1919.
- Skating: English, international, speed, 1920
- Lawn tennis do's and don'ts, 1922
- The technique of lawn tennis demonstrated by cinematography, 1923.
- The lawn tennis umpire & referee: what he must know, and what he should do, 1923
- Studies of savages and sex, 1929. Ed. by Theodore Besterman.
- Dress, drinks, and drums: further studies of savages and sex, 1931. Ed. by Theodore Besterman.
- Oath, curse, and blessing, and other studies in origins, 1934. Ed. by Theodore Besterman. Thinker's Library, no. 40. (Selection from the 1929 Studies and the 1931 Dress, drinks, and drums.)
