= George Greville (tennis) =

English tennis player

- Full name: Turketil George Pearson Greville
- Country (sports): United Kingdom
- Born: 13 March 1868 Chingford, Essex, United Kingdom
- Died: 9 March 1958 (aged 89) Kensington, London, United Kingdom
- Turned pro: 1889 (amateur tour)
- Retired: 1933

Grand Slam singles results
- Wimbledon: QF (1897, 1899, 1902)

Grand Slam doubles results
- Wimbledon: SF (1904)

Grand Slam mixed doubles results
- Wimbledon: 2R (1913)

Turketil George Pearson Greville (13 March 1868 – 9 March 1958) was an English tennis player with a career of record length. He began playing in the 1880s and last entered the singles of the Queen's Club tournament in 1933, at the age of 65. A. Wallis Myers said of Greville, "his powers at the net are unquestionable" and "he knows the game thoroughly". Greville first entered the Wimbledon singles in 1896 and last entered in 1927, at the age of 59 (the oldest competitor ever in the Wimbledon men's singles).

Greville reached the quarter-finals of Wimbledon in 1897 (losing to Wilberforce Eaves), 1899 (losing to Harold Mahony), and 1902 (where he beat George Caridia before losing to eventual winner Laurence Doherty in four sets). After losing early at Wimbledon in 1904, he didn't play again in the singles until 1926. His last appearance was in 1927.

Greville was the son of Rear Admiral John Stapleton Greville and was an heir of the Earls of Warwick. In 1899, he married fellow tennis player Edith Austin.
