= Laurence Doherty =

English tennis player

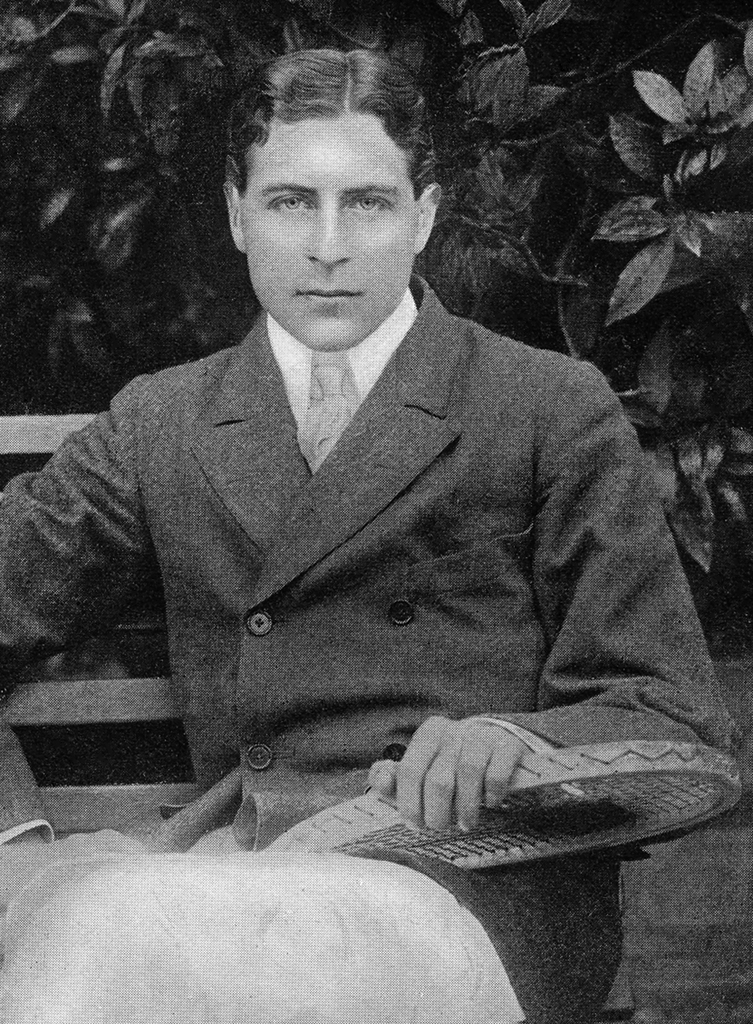
- Full name: Hugh Laurence Doherty
- Country (sports): United Kingdom
- Born: 8 October 1875 Wimbledon, England
- Died: 21 August 1919 (aged 43) Broadstairs, England
- Height: 1.78 m (5 ft 10 in)
- Turned pro: 1893 (amateur)
- Retired: 1910
- Plays: Right-handed (one-handed backhand)
- Int. Tennis HoF: 1980 (member page)

Singles
- Career record: 293–38 (88.5%)
- Career titles: 51
- Highest ranking: No. 1 (1898, ITHF)

Grand Slam singles results
- Wimbledon: W (1902, 1903, 1904, 1905, 1906)
- US Open: W (1903)

Grand Slam doubles results
- Wimbledon: W (1897, 1898, 1899, 1900, 1901, 1903, 1904, 1905)
- US Open: W (1902, 1903)

Team competitions
- Davis Cup: W (1903, 1904, 1905, 1906)
Medal record
Olympic Games – Tennis
Gold medal – first place	1900 Paris	Singles
Gold medal – first place	1900 Paris	Doubles
Representing a Mixed team
Bronze medal – third place	1900 Paris	Mixed doubles

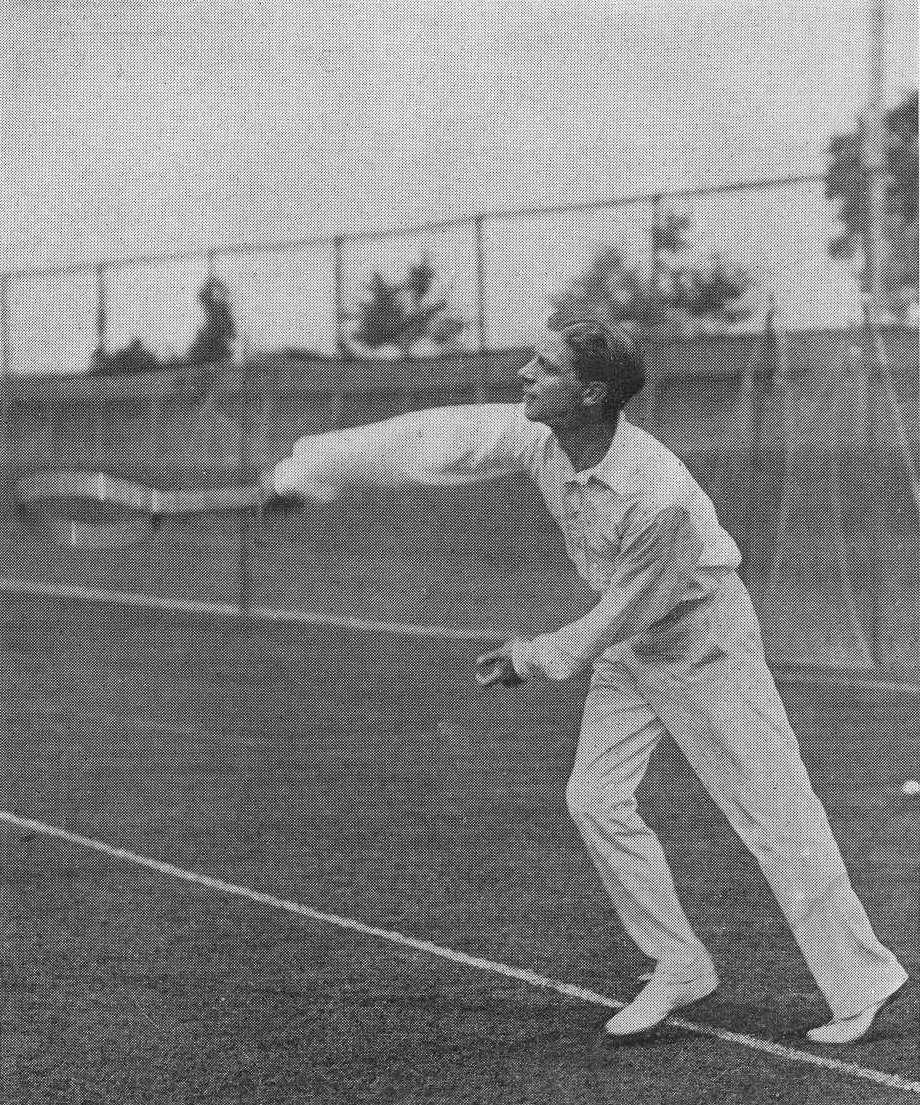
Laurence Doherty

Hugh Laurence Doherty (8 October 1875 – 21 August 1919) was a British tennis player and the younger brother of tennis player Reginald Doherty. He was a six-time Grand Slam champion and a double Olympic Gold medalist at the 1900 Summer Olympics in singles and doubles (also winning a Bronze in mixed doubles). In 1903 he became the first non-American player to win the U.S. National Championships.

== Early life ==
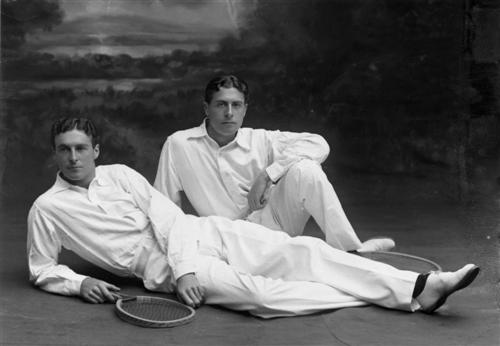
Laurence Doherty (right) with his brother Reginald

Doherty was born on 8 October 1875 at Beulah Villa in Wimbledon, the youngest son of William Doherty, a printer, and his wife, Catherine Ann Davis. Doherty was the shorter of the two brothers, at 1.78 m, who played championship tennis in their native England and at Wimbledon at the turn of the century.

Like his brother he was educated at Westminster School from 1890 to 1894 followed by Trinity Hall, Cambridge, where he played for and became President of the Cambridge University Lawn Tennis Club. He gained his blues in 1896, 1897, and 1898. In 1892 Doherty won the Renshaw cup, the All-England Championships singles title for boys under 16 which was held in Scarborough.

In addition to lawn tennis he also played real tennis and golf.

== Career ==
The brothers were reportedly urged to play tennis by their father, for health reasons. Known as "Little Do", Doherty won Wimbledon five consecutive times in singles and eight times in doubles with his brother. In 1903, he became the first tennis player to win a Grand Slam tournament outside of his native country by beating defending champion William Larned in three straight sets in the final of the US Championships in Newport. He won the singles title at the British Covered Court Championships, played at the Queen's Club in London, six consecutive times between 1901 and 1906. Additionally he won the singles title at The South of France Championships in Nice seven times in a row (1900–1906).

Doherty won the singles event of the tennis competition at the 1900 Summer Olympics in Paris. Gold medals were not given at the 1900 Games. In the semifinal he was scheduled to play against his brother but Reggie withdrew, since the brothers refused to play each other before the final. In the final Doherty defeated Harold Mahony in three straight sets. Doherty also won the doubles title at the 1900 Olympic Games with his brother. In the mixed doubles event he partnered with Marion Jones, the winner of the singles title at the 1899 U.S. Championships, and lost in the semifinal against his brother who had teamed up with Charlotte Cooper.

Between 1902 and 1906 Doherty played for the British Davis Cup team and was undefeated during this period. In 1902 he partnered his brother to win the doubles match in the challenge round against the United States but the latter retained the Cup after a 3–2 victory. In 1903 Doherty won both his singles matches as well as the doubles match to help the British Isles to their first Davis Cup victory. In 1904, 1905 and 1906 he was part of the British team that successfully defended the Cup.

The brothers co-wrote R.F. and H.L. Doherty on Lawn Tennis (1903).

He gave up tennis for golf in 1906 and distinguished himself in that sport as well. In 1908 Doherty reached the last 16 of the British amateur championship at the Royal St George's course.

In 1914, after the outbreak of World War I, Doherty joined the Anti-Aircraft branch of the Royal Naval Volunteer Reserve but was released in 1915 due to ill health.

Doherty died of toxemia on 21 August 1919 at Leon Cottage in Broadstairs, Kent after having tubercular nephritis and cystitis for two years. He was inducted into the International Tennis Hall of Fame in 1980 together with his brother.

== Grand Slam finals ==
=== Singles: 8 (6 titles, 2 runner-up) ===
Result	Year	Championship	Surface	Opponent	Score
Loss	1898	Wimbledon	Grass	(United Kingdom of Great Britain and Ireland) Reginald Doherty	6–3, 6–3, 2–6, 5–7, 6–1
Win	1902	Wimbledon	Grass	(United Kingdom of Great Britain and Ireland) Arthur Gore	6–4, 6–3, 3–6, 6–0
Win	1903	Wimbledon	Grass	(United Kingdom of Great Britain and Ireland) Frank Riseley	7–5, 6–3, 6–0
Win	1903	U.S. National Championships	Grass	(United States) William Larned	6–0, 6–3, 10–8
Win	1904	Wimbledon	Grass	(United Kingdom of Great Britain and Ireland) Frank Riseley	6–1, 7–5, 8–6
Loss	1904	U.S. National Championships	Grass	(United States) Holcombe Ward	w/o
Win	1905	Wimbledon	Grass	(New Zealand) Norman Brookes	8–6, 6–2, 6–4
Win	1906	Wimbledon	Grass	(United Kingdom of Great Britain and Ireland) Frank Riseley	6–4, 4–6, 6–2, 6–3

=== Doubles: 12 (10 titles, 2 runners-up) ===
Result	Year	Championship	Surface	Partner	Opponents	Score
Win	1897	Wimbledon	Grass	(United Kingdom of Great Britain and Ireland) Reginald Doherty	(United Kingdom of Great Britain and Ireland) Herbert Baddeley (United Kingdom of Great Britain and Ireland) Wilfred Baddeley	6–4, 4–6, 8–6, 6–4
Win	1898	Wimbledon	Grass	(United Kingdom of Great Britain and Ireland) Reginald Doherty	(United States) Clarence Hobart (United Kingdom of Great Britain and Ireland) Harold Nisbet	6–4, 6–4, 6–2
Win	1899	Wimbledon	Grass	(United Kingdom of Great Britain and Ireland) Reginald Doherty	(United States) Clarence Hobart (United Kingdom of Great Britain and Ireland) Harold Nisbet	7–5, 6–0, 6–2
Win	1900	Wimbledon	Grass	(United Kingdom of Great Britain and Ireland) Reginald Doherty	(United Kingdom of Great Britain and Ireland) Herbert Roper Barrett (United Kingdom of Great Britain and Ireland) Harold Nisbet	9–7, 7–5, 4–6, 3–6, 6–3
Win	1901	Wimbledon	Grass	(United Kingdom of Great Britain and Ireland) Reginald Doherty	(United States) Dwight Davis (United States) Holcombe Ward	4–6, 6–2, 6–3, 9–7
Loss	1902	Wimbledon	Grass	(United Kingdom of Great Britain and Ireland) Reginald Doherty	(United Kingdom) Frank Riseley (United Kingdom of Great Britain and Ireland) Sydney Smith	6–4, 6–8, 3–6, 6–4, 9–11
Win	1902	U.S. National Championships	Grass	(United Kingdom of Great Britain and Ireland) Reginald Doherty	(United States) Dwight Davis (United States) Holcombe Ward	11–9, 12–10, 6–4
Win	1903	Wimbledon	Grass	(United Kingdom of Great Britain and Ireland) Reginald Doherty	(United Kingdom) Frank Riseley (United Kingdom of Great Britain and Ireland) Sydney Smith	6–4, 6–4, 6–4
Win	1903	U.S. National Championships	Grass	(United Kingdom of Great Britain and Ireland) Reginald Doherty	(United States) Kreigh Collins (United States) L. Harry Waidner	7–5, 6–3, 6–3
Win	1904	Wimbledon	Grass	(United Kingdom of Great Britain and Ireland) Reginald Doherty	(United Kingdom) Frank Riseley (United Kingdom of Great Britain and Ireland) Sydney Smith	6–1, 6–2, 6–4
Win	1905	Wimbledon	Grass	(United Kingdom of Great Britain and Ireland) Reginald Doherty	(United Kingdom) Frank Riseley (United Kingdom of Great Britain and Ireland) Sydney Smith	6–2, 6–4, 6–8, 6–3
Loss	1906	Wimbledon	Grass	(United Kingdom of Great Britain and Ireland) Reginald Doherty	(United Kingdom) Frank Riseley (United Kingdom of Great Britain and Ireland) Sydney Smith	8–6, 4–6, 7–5, 3–6, 3–6

== Singles titles ==
No.	Date	Tournament	Surface	Opponent	Score
1.	16 August 1896	Essex Championship, Colchester, England	Grass	(United Kingdom) Edward Roy Allen	6–4, 6–2, 7–5
2.	27 September 1896	Welsh Covered Court Championships, Llandudno, Wales	Wood (i)	(United Kingdom) George Simond	6–0, 6–0
3.	27 August 1897	Suffolk Championships, Saxmundham, England	Grass	(United Kingdom) Charles Henry Ridding	6–3, 8–6, 4–6, 6–1
4.	18 July 1897	Queen's Club Championships, London, England	Grass	(United Kingdom) Major Ritchie	6–2, 6–2, 6–2
5.	March 1898	South of France Championships	Clay	(United Kingdom) J.R. Hay Gordon	6–1, 6–2, 6–1
6.	March 1898	Monte Carlo	Clay	(Germany) Count Voss	4–6, 6–3, 6–3, 4–0 ret.
7.	18 June 1898	Northern Lawn Tennis Association Tournament, Liverpool	Grass	(United Kingdom) Wilfred Baddeley	walkover
8.	11 July 1898	Queen's Club Championships, London, England	Grass	(United Kingdom) Harold Mahony	6–3, 6–4, 9–7
9.	August 1898	Scottish Championships	Grass	(United Kingdom) Reginald Doherty	walkover
10.	March 1900	South of France Championships, Nice	Clay	(United Kingdom) Reginald Doherty	walkover
11.	11 July 1900	Olympic Games, Paris	Clay	(United Kingdom) Harold Mahony	6–4, 6–2, 6–3
12.	26 August 1900	The Homburg Cup, Bad Homburg vor der Höhe, Germany	Clay	(United Kingdom) George Hillyard	7–5, 6–2, 3–6, 4–6, 6–2
13.	September 1900	Dinard, France	Clay	(United Kingdom) Harold Mahony	4–6, 6–1, 8–6, 7–5
14.	16 September 1900	South of England Championships	Grass	(United Kingdom) Sidney Smith	6–4, 1–6, 6–2, 6–1
15.	March 1901	Cannes, France	Clay	(United Kingdom) George Hillyard	6–3, 6–3, ret.
16.	17 March 1901	Monte Carlo	Clay	(United Kingdom) Wilberforce Eaves	6–2, 5–7, 6–1
17.	24 March 1901	South of France Championships, Nice	Clay	(United Kingdom) Wilberforce Eaves	6–2, 6–3, 6–2
18.	27 April 1901	British Covered Court Championships	Wood (i)	(United Kingdom) Arthur Gore	6–3, 6–1, 6–1
19.	June 1901	Kent Championships, Beckenham, England	Grass	(United Kingdom) Arthur Gore	6–1, 6–3, 3–6, 6–4
20.	August 1901	Buxton Championships	Grass	(United Kingdom) George Hillyard	6–4, 7–5, 3–6, 6–2
21.	August 1901	North of England Championships, Scarborough	Grass	(United Kingdom) Ernest Black	6–2, 6–1, 6–1
22.	March 1902	South of France Championships, Nice	Clay	(United Kingdom) Reginald Doherty	walkover
23.	April 1902	British Covered Court Championships, Queens, London	Wood	(United Kingdom) Major Ritchie	6–4, 6–3, 5–7, 6–3
24.	May – June 1902	Irish Championships, Dublin	Grass	(United Kingdom) Reginald Doherty	walkover
25.	15 June 1902	Kent Championships, Beckenham, England	Grass	(France) George Simond	6–4, 6–0, 6–3
26.	June 1902	Wimbledon Championships	Grass	(United Kingdom) Arthur Gore	6–4, 6–3, 3–6, 6–0
27.	15 October 1902	European Championships, Queen's Club, London	Wood (i)	(United Kingdom) Harold Mahony	4–6, 6–4, 6–3, 6–1
28.	15 March 1903	South of France Championships, Nice	Clay	(United Kingdom) Sidney Smith	5–7, 3–6, 6–3, 6–4, 6–3
29.	26 April 1903	British Covered Court Championships, Queens, London	Wood (i)	(United Kingdom) George Hillyard	6–1, 4–6, 6–4, 6–2
30.	4 July 1903	Kent Championships, Beckenham, England	Grass	(United Kingdom) Arthur Gore	6–1, 6–2, 6–2
31.	June 1903	Wimbledon Championships	Grass	(United Kingdom) Frank Riseley	7–5, 6–3, 6–0
32.	1 August 1903	Nahant, USA	Grass	(United States) William Clothier	6–4, 6–0
33.	14 August 1903	Southampton, USA	Grass	(United States) Bill Larned	6–1, 6–2, 6–1
34.	27 August 1903	US National Championships, Newport, USA	Grass	(United States) Bill Larned	6–0, 6–3, 10–8
35.	14 March 1904	South of France Championships, Nice	Clay	(United Kingdom) Major Ritchie	6–2, 6–3, 6–3
36.	20 March 1904	Cannes Championships, France	Clay	(United Kingdom) Major Ritchie	6–1, 6–4, 6–1
37.	April 1904	British Covered Court Championships, Queens, London	Wood (i)	(United Kingdom) Major Ritchie	6–2, 8–10, 5–7, 6–4, 6–3
38.	27 June 1904	Wimbledon Championships	Grass	(United Kingdom) Frank Riseley	6–1, 7–5, 8–6
39.	July 1904	Northumberland Championships, England	Wood (i)	(United Kingdom) George Ball-Greene	6–4, 6–1
40.	March 1905	Monte Carlo	Clay	(United Kingdom) Major Ritchie	6–4, 8–6, 6–4
41.	March 1905	South of France Championships, Nice	Clay	(United Kingdom) Edward Allen	6–3, 7–5, 7–5
42.	15 April 1905	British Covered Court Championships, London	Wood (i)	(United Kingdom) Major Ritchie	6–1, 8–6, 6–2
43.	July 1905	Wimbledon Championships	Grass	(Australia) Norman Brookes	8–6, 6–2, 6–4
44.	28 February 1906	Monte Carlo	Clay	(United Kingdom) Wilberforce Eaves	6–3, 11–9
45.	18 March 1906	South of France Championships, Nice	Clay	(New Zealand) Anthony Wilding	6–3, 8–6, 6–2
46.	28 April 1906	British Covered Court Championships, London	Wood (i)	(United Kingdom) Arthur Gore	6–2, 6–4, 8–6
47.	July 1906	Wimbledon Championships	Grass	(United Kingdom) Frank Riseley	6–4, 4–6, 6–2, 6–3
48.	August 1908	Yorkshire Championships	Grass	(United Kingdom) George Hillyard	6–1, 6–4, 6–2
49.	July 1909	Nottinghamshire Championships, Nottingham	Grass	(United Kingdom) Wilberforce Eaves	6–3, 6–4
50.	August 1909	North of England Championships, Scarborough	Grass	(United Kingdom) Gordon Lowe	7–5, 6–1, 6–1
51.	August 1910	North of England Championships, Scarborough	Grass	(United Kingdom) Gordon Lowe	6–3, 6–2, 6–2
