= Frederick William Payn =

British tennis player

F.W. Payn
- Full name: Frederick William Payn
- Country (sports): United Kingdom
- Born: 16 September 1872; Bickley, Kent, England
- Died: c. 6 March 1908 (age 35); Baku or Unus, Russian Empire
- Plays: Left-handed

Singles

Grand Slam singles results
- Wimbledon: QF (1900, 1902)

Doubles

Grand Slam doubles results
- Wimbledon: 1R (1900)

Frederick William Payn (16 September 1872 – c. 6 March 1908) was a British amateur tennis player at the turn of the 20th century. He reached the singles quarterfinals of Wimbledon in 1900 and 1902 and the finals of the German International Championships in 1901. He won the singles title at the Scottish Championships defeating compatriot Ernest Wills in the final in straight sets.

He attended Trinity Hall, Cambridge and was called to the bar at the Inner Temple as a solicitor in 1899. He was a barrister by profession.

In addition to legal writings, Payn was also authored the tennis books Tennis Topics and Tactics (1904), Secrets of Lawn Tennis (1906). and Lifting the Veil (1907).

Payn died in Baku or Unus, Russian Empire (now Azerbaijan), in March 1908.

== Selected publications ==
- Tennis Topics and Tactics (1904, 1907)
- The Secrets of Lawn Tennis (1906)
- Lifting the Veil (1907)
