= Clement Cazalet =

British tennis player

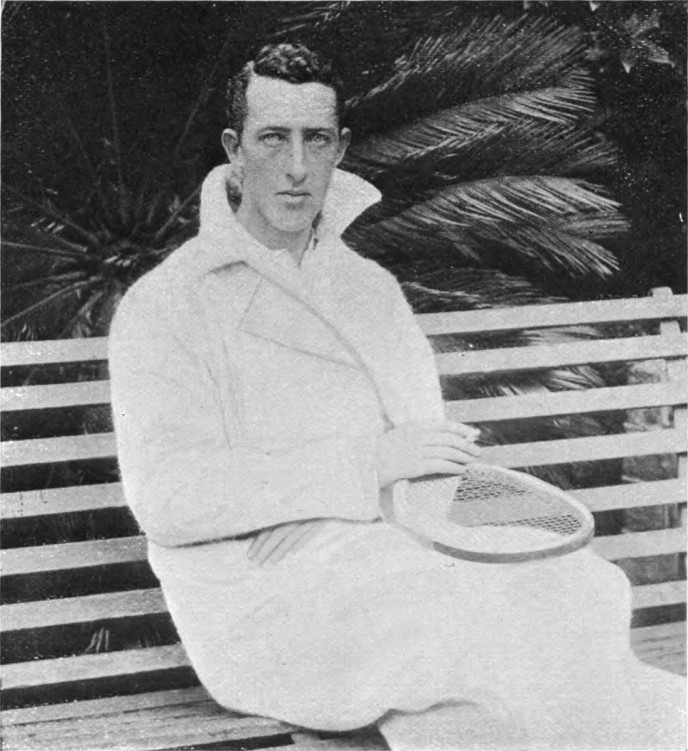
- Cazalet, ca. 1900
- Full name: Clement Haughton Langston Cazalet
- Country (sports): United Kingdom
- Born: 16 July 1869; Holmwood, Surrey
- Died: 23 March 1950 (aged 80); Harrow, London

Singles
- Career record: 98–82
- Career titles: 5

Grand Slam singles results
- Wimbledon: QF (1896, 1906)

Doubles

Grand Slam doubles results
- Wimbledon: F (1897, 1902, 1906)

Other doubles tournaments
- Olympic Games: SF (1908)
Medal record
Representing Great Britain
Tennis, Summer Olympics
Bronze medal – third place	1908 London	Doubles

Clement Haughton Langston Cazalet DSO (16 July 1869 – 23 March 1950) was a British tennis player who competed in the 1908 Summer Olympics.

He was the son among ten children of businessman William Clement Cazalet (brother of Edward Cazalet) and Emmeline Agnes Cazalet (nee Fawcett). Cazalet was educated at Rugby School and Trinity College, Cambridge. His career singles highlights include winning the Cambridge University LTC Tournament in 1888, the Keswick Open in 1891, and the Carlisle Open in 1899.

In 1908 he won the bronze medal in the men's doubles competition together with his partner Charles Dixon.

While serving in the First World War as a Major and volunteer ambulance driver with the British Red Cross Society and St John Ambulance Brigade, Cazalet was awarded the Distinguished Service Order in the 1917 Birthday Honours. By profession, he was a marine engineer who worked on undersea cable laying projects in the Atlantic and Pacific Ocean.
