= Lionel Escombe =

British tennis player

- Full name: Lionel Hunter Escombe
- Country (sports): United Kingdom
- Born: 20 June 1874 Colony of Natal
- Died: 15 October 1914 (aged 40) London, England
- Turned pro: 1890 (amateur tour)
- Retired: 1909

Singles

Grand Slam singles results
- Wimbledon: QF (1907, 1909)

Other tournaments
- Olympic Games: 1R (1908^{In})

Lionel Hunter Escombe (20 June 1874 – 15 October 1914) was a British male tennis player. He competed for Great Britain in the tennis event at the 1908 Summer Olympics where he took part in the men's indoor singles and indoor doubles event. In the singles competition, he lost in the first round to Gunnar Setterwall in straight sets. In the doubles, he partnered with Major Ritchie and, after a bye in the quarter-finals, reached the semifinal in which they were defeated by compatriots Arthur Gore and Herbert Roper Barrett. They subsequently lost the match for third place and the bronze medal against Wollmar Boström and Gunnar Setterwall.

Escombe's best performance at a Grand Slam tournament was reaching the quarter final in the singles event at the 1907 Wimbledon Championships, which he lost in five sets to Wilberforce Eaves. He equaled this performance at the 1907 Wimbledon Championships, this time losing to Herbert Roper-Barrett in straight sets.

Escombe won the Championship of Lucerne in 1902 and the Spanish Championships in 1905.

In 1909, he was runner-up in the men's singles event at the South African Championships, losing in the final to compatriot and multiple Wimbledon champion Reginald Doherty in straight sets.

He died in London on 15 October 1914 as a result of an aneurysm.
