= Brame Hillyard =

British tennis player

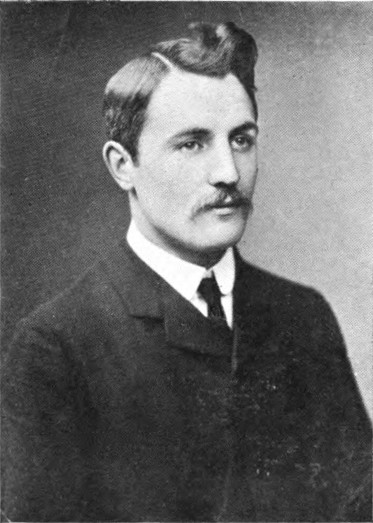
- Country (sports): United Kingdom
- Born: 23 August 1876 Darlington, Durham, England
- Died: 18 June 1959 (aged 82) Tonbridge, Kent, England
- Turned pro: 1897 (amateur tour)
- Retired: 1938

Singles
- Career record: 244–135
- Career titles: 11

Grand Slam singles results
- French Open: 2R (1927)
- Wimbledon: QF (1903)

Other tournaments
- WHCC: 4R (1923)

Grand Slam doubles results
- Wimbledon: QF (1900, 1904)

Brame Hillyard (23 August 1876 – 18 June 1959) was a British tennis player. He was a three time quarter finalist at the Wimbledon Championships in singles in 1903 and in doubles in 1900 and 1904. He also competed at the 1923 World Hard Court Championships where he lost in the fourth round to Henri Cochet. He was active from 1897 to 1938 and won 11 career singles titles.

== Career ==
Brame was born in Darlington, England, in 1876. Hillyard is notable for being the first tennis player to appear at Wimbledon wearing shorts rather than trousers. He did so in 1930 on Court 10. Bunny Austin, three years later, was the first male player to do so on Centre Court. Hillyard reached the quarter-finals of the event in 1903. He competed at the 1923 World Hard Court Championships where he lost in the fourth round to Henri Cochet.

He played his first tournament in 1897 at the Gipsy Championships where he reached the semi finals. He won his first title in 1901 at the Bournemouth Open Tournament against Edward Yatman. His other career singles highlights included winning the Sheffield and Hallamshire Championships (1922), the Marseille International (1922), Bexhill-on-Sea Open (1923), the Hampshire Lawn Tennis Championships (1923).

He also won the Cannes Métropole Hotel Championship (1923), the Beausoleil Championships in Monte Carlo (1923), East Grinstead Open (1924), the Welsh Championships (1925) in Newport, the Aix-Les-Bains International (1927). His final title was at the Cannes Beau Site New Year Meeting in 1929. and his final singles event was the Cannes Championships in 1938. He died in Tonbridge, England, in 1959.
