= Roderick McNair =

British tennis player

- Full name: Roderick James McNair
- Country (sports): United Kingdom
- Born: 25 November 1870 London, England
- Died: 18 November 1944 (aged 73) London, England
- Turned pro: 1895 (amateur)
- Retired: 1921

Singles
- Career record: 168-112 (60%)
- Career titles: 3

Grand Slam singles results
- Wimbledon: QF (1900, 1901, 1904)

Grand Slam doubles results
- Wimbledon: SF (1907)

Grand Slam mixed doubles results
- Wimbledon: QF (1913)

Roderick James McNair (25 November 1870 – 18 November 1944) was a British amateur tennis player who competed at the turn of the 20th century.

He married Winifred Margaret Slocock on 22 April 1908.

== Tennis career ==
McNair reached the quarter-finals of Wimbledon in 1900, 1901 and 1904. He also regularly competed at Queens, reaching the semifinals in 1899 and 1907.
