= Frank Riseley =

British tennis player

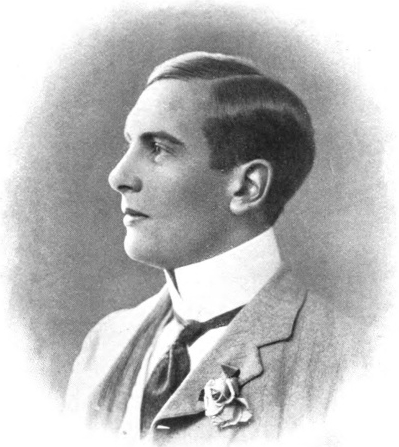
- Full name: Frank Lorymer Riseley
- Country (sports): United Kingdom
- Born: 6 July 1877 Clifton, Bristol, UK
- Died: 6 February 1959 (aged 81) Torquay, UK
- Plays: Right-handed (one-handed backhand)

Singles
- Career record: 174/72 (70.7%)
- Career titles: 11
- Highest ranking: 3 (1906)

Grand Slam singles results
- Wimbledon: F (1903^{Ch}, 1904^{Ch}, 1906^{Ch})

Grand Slam doubles results
- Wimbledon: W (1902, 1906)

Grand Slam mixed doubles results
- Wimbledon: 2R (1919)

Team competitions
- Davis Cup: W (1904)

Frank Lorymer Riseley (6 July 1877 – 6 February 1959) was a British tennis player. He won the Northern Championships in 1906 and was a three time Wimbledon singles finalist (1903, 1904, 1906), two time Wimbledon doubles champion (1902, 1906) and won 11 career singles titles.

== Career ==
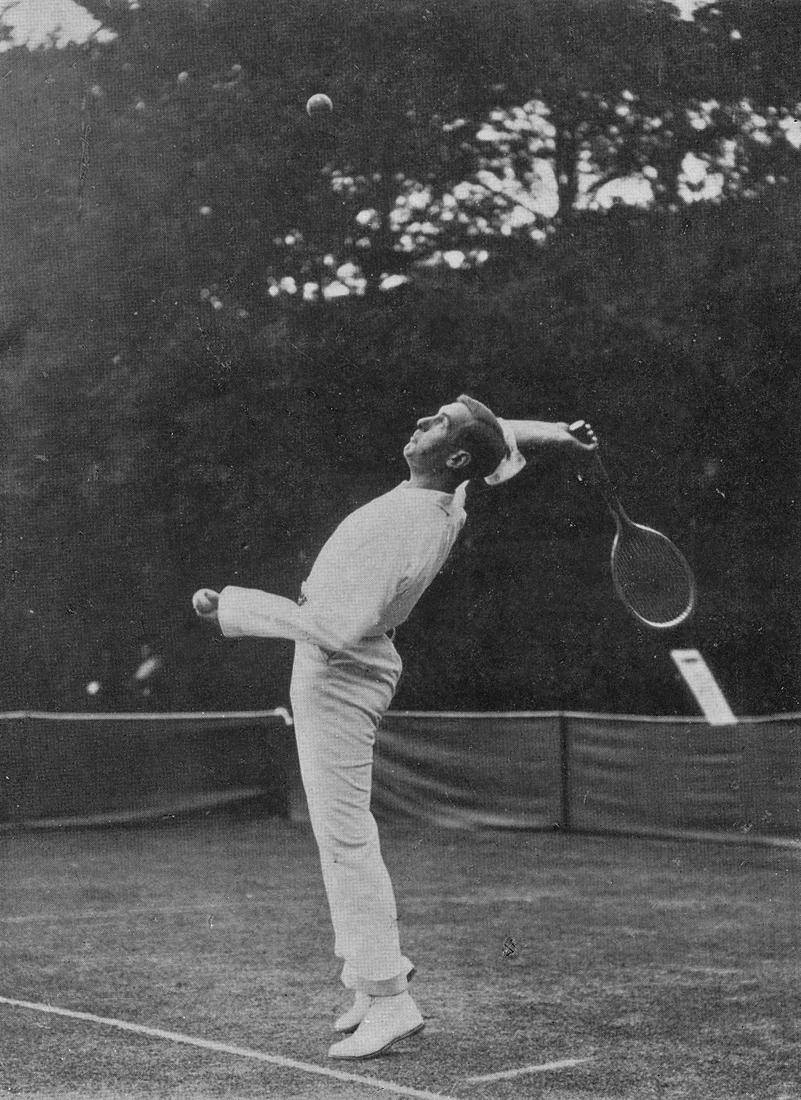
Frank L Riseley beginning of service

Risley played his first tournament at the Warwickshire Championships in 1892 losing to Wilberforce Eaves in the second round in two straight sets. In 1895 after playing in sixteen events during the previous three years he won his first title at the Waterloo Tournament in Liverpool, Lancashire. The same year he reached the all comers final of the prestigious Northern Championships before losing to Herbert Baddeley in five sets. In 1896 he retained his Waterloo title by way of a walkover against Arthur Henry Riseley. In 1896 he won the Sheffield and Hallamshire Championships at Sheffield, Yorkshire defeating Edward Roy Allen three sets to love. He then reached the final of the Teignmouth and Shaldon tennis tournament, but then conceded the title by a walkover. He played his first Wimbledon Championships the same year reaching the quarter-finals stage before losing to Harold Mahony in four sets.

In 1897 he picked up a third consecutive Waterloo title against Arthur Henry Riseley beating him two sets to love in the final. He travelled to Paris to compete at the French Covered Court Championships on indoor wood courts where he progressed to the final before losing to Ireland's Manliffe Francis Goodbody in three straight sets. In 1898 he reached the final of the Exmouth Open Tennis Tournament losing in five close sets to Edward Roy Allen. In 1900 he was a finalist at the Derbyshire Championships at Buxton before losing to George Hillyard over four sets. In 1902 he reached the final of the Midland Counties Championships at Edgbaston before losing to Sidney Howard Smith in 3 sets. At the Scottish Championships at Moffat that year he won that title against John Mycroft Boucher. He then played at the Sussex Championships held in Brighton when he retired at two sets all in the final conceding the title to Sydney Smith.

Riseley won the Wimbledon Gentlemen's Doubles title twice, in 1902 and 1906, partnering with Sydney Smith. His singles career at Wimbledon was impressive, though he never won the title losing three finals. In 1903 Riseley beat Smith and Major Ritchie before losing in the Challenge Round to Laurence Doherty. In 1904 Riseley beat Harold Mahony, Arthur Gore, Smith and Ritchie before losing in the challenge round to Laurence Doherty. In 1906 Riseley beat Smith and Gore before losing to Laurence Doherty.

In 1903 he travelled to Monaco where he reached the final of the Monte-Carlo Cup against Reggie Doherty, but retired at 14-16 in the second set. In 1904 and 1905 he reached the finals of the Northern Championships losing both of them to Sydney Smith. In 1906 after four attempts he won the Northern. In 1904 he again reached the finals of the Sussex Championships but conceded the tile by retiring at 3 games all in the third set. In 1905 he reached the final of the South of England Championships at Eastbourne before losing to Australian player Norman Brookes.

Early in 1906 he won the Irish Championships at the Fitzwilliam Club, Dublin and later in June that year he dispatched New Zealander Tony Wilding in the semi-finals in straight sets, before going onto win the singles event against George Greene at the short-lived European Championship event held in Leicester . In the final he was leading the Irishman George Ball-Greene, 4–6, 6–1, 5–1 when the latter retired. In 1912 he won another title, this time on clay at the Dinard tournament in Dinard, France against Robert Powell. In 1920 he played and reached the final of the West of England Championships held at Bristol before losing to New Zealander Francis Fisher over four sets. In 1921 he travelled to France again to compete at the second meeting of the Le Touquet tournament where he reached the final before losing to Joseph de Poncheville three sets to two. In 1925 he played his final tournament at the West of England Championships going on to win that event and secure a tenth career title.

He played for the Great Britain Davis Cup team in 1904 against Belgium and won both his singles matches. His second and last Davis Cup appearance came 18 years later, in 1922, when he won the doubles match partnering with Algernon Kingscote.

== Grand Slam finals ==
=== Singles: 3 runners-up ===
Result	Year	Championship	Surface	Opponent	Score
Loss	1903	Wimbledon	Grass	(United Kingdom) Laurence Doherty	5–7, 3–6, 0–6
Loss	1904	Wimbledon	Grass	(United Kingdom) Laurence Doherty	1–6, 5–7, 6–8
Loss	1906	Wimbledon	Grass	(United Kingdom) Laurence Doherty	4–6, 6–4, 2–6, 3–6

=== Doubles: 5 (2 titles, 3 runners-up) ===
Result	Year	Championship	Surface	Partner	Opponents	Score
Win	1902	Wimbledon	Grass	(United Kingdom) Sydney Smith	(United Kingdom) Laurence Doherty (United Kingdom) Reginald Doherty	4–6, 8–6, 6–3, 4–6, 11–9
Loss	1903	Wimbledon	Grass	(United Kingdom) Sydney Smith	(United Kingdom) Laurence Doherty (United Kingdom) Reginald Doherty	4–6, 4–6, 4–6
Loss	1904	Wimbledon	Grass	(United Kingdom) Sydney Smith	(United Kingdom) Laurence Doherty (United Kingdom) Reginald Doherty	1–6, 2–6, 4–6
Loss	1905	Wimbledon	Grass	(United Kingdom) Sydney Smith	(United Kingdom) Laurence Doherty (United Kingdom) Reginald Doherty	2–6, 4–6, 8–6, 3–6
Win	1906	Wimbledon	Grass	(United Kingdom) Sydney Smith	(United Kingdom) Laurence Doherty (United Kingdom) Reginald Doherty	6–8, 6–4, 5–7, 6–3, 6–3
