= Major Ritchie =

English tennis player (1870–1955)

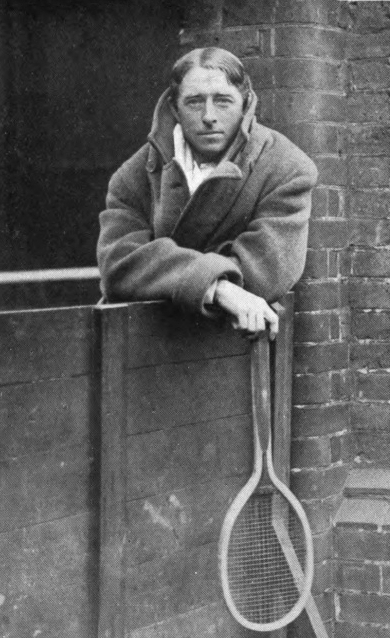
- Full name: Major Josiah George Ritchie
- Country (sports): United Kingdom
- Born: 18 October 1870 Westminster, England
- Died: 28 February 1955 (aged 84) Ashford, Middlesex, England
- Turned pro: 1893 (amateur)
- Retired: 1933
- Plays: Right-handed (one-handed backhand)

Singles
- Career record: 1274–371 (77.4%)
- Career titles: 131

Grand Slam singles results
- Wimbledon: F (1902^{AC}, 1903^{AC}, 1904^{AC}, 1909^{Ch})

Other tournaments
- WCCC: SF (1920)

Grand Slam doubles results
- Wimbledon: W (1908, 1910)
Medal record
Olympic Games – Tennis
Gold medal – first place	1908 London	Singles
Silver medal – second place	1908 London	Doubles
Bronze medal – third place	1908 London	Indoor singles

Major Josiah George Ritchie (18 October 1870 – 28 February 1955) was a tennis player from Great Britain. Major was his first name, not a military title. He was born in Westminster, educated at Brighton College and died in Ashford, Middlesex.

== Career ==
Ritchie was a three-time medalist at the 1908 London Olympics, winning a Gold (Men's Singles), Silver (Men's Doubles) and Bronze (Men's Indoor Singles) medal. He was the last British player to win an Olympic medal in singles until Andy Murray won Gold in the 2012 games, also in London. In 1908 and 1910 he and Anthony Wilding won the doubles in Wimbledon. In 1902 Ritchie reached the all comers final at Wimbledon, beating Sydney Smith before losing to Laurence Doherty. In 1903 and 1904 Ritchie lost in the all comers final to Frank Riseley. In 1909 he reached the Wimbledon Challenge Round, beating Harry Parker, Stanley Doust, Charles P. Dixon and Herbert Roper Barrett before losing in five sets to Arthur Gore. In March 1907 Ritchie caused an upset by defeating Laurence Doherty in the Monte Carlo singles final. In June 1907 he won the Irish Championships. Ritchie was a five times winner of the Championships of Germany, played in Hamburg, from 1903 to 1906 and in 1908 (in 1904 and 1906 he also won the doubles title). (Note: At the time the German Championships used the Challenge Round system. This meant that after winning his first German title in 1903 Ritchie did not have to play through the 1904 tournament but only played against the winner of the All Comers event, Kurt von Wessely. In 1905 and 1906 he defeated Anthony Wilding and Friedrich Wilhelm Rahe respectively in the Challenge Round.) (Note: After winning his third German title in 1905 he became the owner of the cup, a general custom at the time. The cup was in all likelihood lost when his house was bombed in World War II.) He was also a five-time winner of the singles title at the Austrian Championship (from 1900 to 1903 and 1905). In 1908 he was member of the British Davis Cup team. He won three consecutive titles at the Surrey Championships from 1908 to 1910.

Other career highlights include winning the Riviera Championships at Menton, France four times (1904–1905, 1907–1908), the French Covered Court Championships four times (1899, 1902, 1905, 1908) . In 1911 Ritchie won the Queen's Club Covered Courts Championship, defeating Wilding in five sets. In 1919 he won the Ilkley Open Lawn Tennis Tournament. In 1920, at age 50, he reached the semifinal of the World Covered Court Championships at the Queen's Club in London.

Ritchie was also active in other sports. In 1903 he competed in a regatta in Laleham and won the single sculls and coxless pairs events. In addition, he competed in table tennis and was the secretary of the Table Tennis Association, founded in 1902. That year he co-wrote a book on table tennis titled Table tennis and how to play it, with rules. In 1909 he authored The Text Book of Lawn Tennis.

== Grand Slam finals ==
=== Singles (1 runner-up) ===
Result	Year	Championship	Surface	Opponent	Score
Loss	1909	Wimbledon	Grass	(United Kingdom of Great Britain and Ireland) Arthur Gore	8–6, 6–1, 2–6, 2–6, 2–6

=== Doubles (2 titles) ===
Result	Year	Championship	Surface	Partner	Opponents	Score
Win	1908	Wimbledon	Grass	(New Zealand) Anthony Wilding	(United Kingdom) Arthur Gore (United Kingdom) Herbert Roper Barrett	6–1, 6–2, 1–6, 9–7
Win	1910	Wimbledon	Grass	(New Zealand) Anthony Wilding	(United Kingdom) Arthur Gore (United Kingdom) Herbert Roper Barrett	6–1, 6–1, 6–2

== Performance timeline ==
Key
W	F	SF	QF	#R	RR	Q#	P#	DNQ	A	Z#	PO	G	S	B	NMS	NTI	P	NH

(W) winner; (F) finalist; (SF) semifinalist; (QF) quarterfinalist; (#R) rounds 4, 3, 2, 1; (RR) round-robin stage; (Q#) qualification round; (P#) preliminary round; (DNQ) did not qualify; (A) absent; (Z#) Davis/Fed Cup Zonal Group (with number indication) or (PO) play-off; (G) gold, (S) silver or (B) bronze Olympic/Paralympic medal; (NMS) not a Masters tournament; (NTI) not a Tier I tournament; (P) postponed; (NH) not held; (SR) strike rate (events won / competed); (W–L) win–loss record.

Events with a challenge round: (W_{C}) won; (CR) lost the challenge round; (F_{A}) all comers' finalist

	1897	1898	1899	1900	1901	1902	1903	1904	1905	1906	1907	1908		1909	1910	1911	1912		1913	1914	1915	1916	1917	1918	1919	1920	1921	1922	1923	1924	1925	1926	SR	W–L	Win %
Grand Slam tournaments																																	0 / 24	62–24	72.1
French	Only for French club members																				Not held					Only for French club members					A	A	0 / 0	0–0	–
Wimbledon	2R	QF	3R	3R	3R	F_{A}	F_{A}	F_{A}	SF	QF	SF	SF		CR	3R	4R	4R		A	3R	Not held				SF	3R	3R	3R	1R	3R	A	1R	0 / 24	62–24	72.1
U.S.	A	A	A	A	A	A	A	A	A	A	A	A		A	A	A	A		A	A	A	A	A	A	A	A	A	A	A	A	A	A	0 / 0	0–0	–
Australian	Not held								A	A	A	A		A	A	A	A		A	A	A	Not held			A	A	A	A	A	A	A	A	0 / 0	0–0	–
Win–loss	0–1	2–1	1–1	1–1	1–1	4–1	4–1	5–1	4–1	3–1	4–1	4–1		7–1	2–1	3–1	3–1			1–1					5–1	2–1	2–1	2–1	0–1	2–1		0–1			
National representation
Olympics	Not held			A	Not held			A	Not held			G	B	Not held			A	A	Not held							A	Not held			A	Not held		1 / 2	5–1	83.3
