= Sydney Howard Smith =

British badminton and tennis player

Sydney Smith
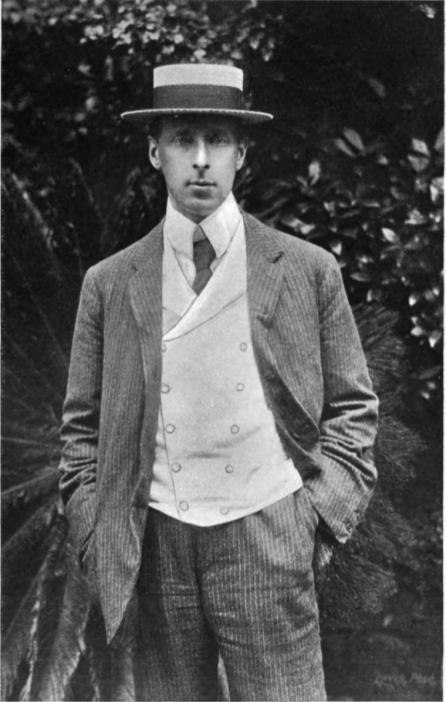
- Full name: Sydney Howard Smith
- Country (sports): (United Kingdom of Great Britain and Ireland) United Kingdom
- Born: 3 February 1872 Stroud, Gloucestershire
- Died: 27 March 1947 (aged 75) Stroud, Gloucestershire
- Turned pro: 1891 (amateur tour)
- Retired: 1906
- Plays: Right-handed (one-handed backhand)

Singles
- Career record: 318-56 (85.03%)
- Career titles: 52
- Highest ranking: 3

Grand Slam singles results
- Wimbledon: F (1899, 1900^{Ch}, 1905)
- US Open: 2R (1904)

Grand Slam doubles results
- Wimbledon: W (1902, 1906)

Team competitions
- Davis Cup: W (1905, 1906)

Sydney Howard Smith (3 February 1872 – 27 March 1947) was a British tennis and badminton player.

== Career ==
Sydney Smith was the first All England Badminton Men's Singles champion in 1900. He reached his first Wimbledon singles final in 1899, beating Herbert Roper Barrett in a five-set semifinal; he then lost the all comers final to Arthur Gore in four sets. In 1900, Smith beat Gore in the all comers final at Wimbledon, then lost to Reginald Doherty in the challenge round in four sets. In 1905, Smith beat Holcombe Ward, Wilberforce Eaves, William Larned, and Major Ritchie and then ;psy the all comers final in five sets to Norman Brookes. Smith and partner Frank Riseley won the doubles title at Wimbledon in 1902 and 1906. He was a member of the British Davis Cup team in 1905 and 1906.

His other career highlights included winning the Welsh Championships singles title 10 times (1896 to 1906), the Midland Counties Championships at Edgbaston nine times from (1896 to 1898 and 190 to 1905), the Northern Championships singles title seven consecutive times (1899 to 1905), and the Sussex Championships six times (1899 to 1902 and 1904 to 1905), and the Burton-on-Trent Open three times (1897 to 1899).

The mixed doubles trophy, a silver challenge cup, and cover presented to the winners of the mixed doubles at Wimbledon was given to the All England Club by Smith's family.

== Grand Slam finals ==
=== Singles: 1 runner-up ===
Result	Year	Championship	Surface	Opponent	Score	Ref.
Loss	1900	Wimbledon	Grass	(United Kingdom of Great Britain and Ireland) Reginald Doherty	8–6, 3–6, 1–6, 2–6	

=== Doubles: 5 (2 titles, 3 runners-up) ===
Result	Year	Championship	Surface	Partner	Opponents	Score	Ref.
Win	1902	Wimbledon	Grass	(United Kingdom of Great Britain and Ireland) Frank Riseley	(United Kingdom of Great Britain and Ireland) Reginald Doherty (United Kingdom) Laurence Doherty	4–6, 8–6, 6–3, 4–6, 11–9	
Loss	1903	Wimbledon	Grass	(United Kingdom of Great Britain and Ireland) Frank Riseley	(United Kingdom of Great Britain and Ireland) Reginald Doherty (United Kingdom) Laurence Doherty	4–6, 4–6, 4–6	
Loss	1904	Wimbledon	Grass	(United Kingdom of Great Britain and Ireland) Frank Riseley	(United Kingdom of Great Britain and Ireland) Reginald Doherty (United Kingdom) Laurence Doherty	1–6, 2–6, 4–6	
Loss	1905	Wimbledon	Grass	(United Kingdom of Great Britain and Ireland) Frank Riseley	(United Kingdom of Great Britain and Ireland) Reginald Doherty (United Kingdom) Laurence Doherty	2–6, 4–6, 8–6, 3–6	
Win	1906	Wimbledon	Grass	(United Kingdom of Great Britain and Ireland) Frank Riseley	(United Kingdom of Great Britain and Ireland) Reginald Doherty (United Kingdom) Laurence Doherty	6–8, 6–4, 5–7, 6–3, 6–3	
