= George Simond =

English tennis player

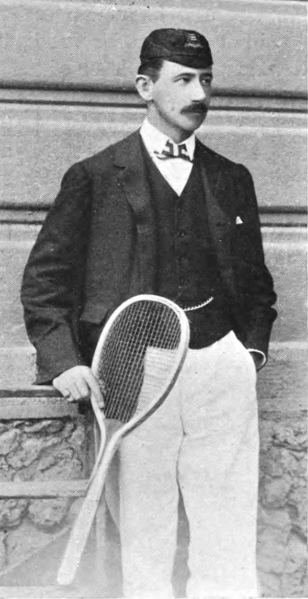
- Full name: George Miéville Simond
- Country (sports): United Kingdom
- Born: 23 January 1867; Marylebone, England
- Died: 8 April 1941 (aged 74); Monte Carlo, Monaco

Singles

Grand Slam singles results
- Wimbledon: QF (1894, 1895, 1896, 1898, 1901)

Doubles

Grand Slam doubles results
- Wimbledon: F (1906)

Other doubles tournaments
- Olympic Games: Silver Medal (1908^{In})

Olympic medal record

Men's tennis
Silver medal – second place	1908 London	Indoor Doubles

George Miéville Simond (23 January 1867 – 8 April 1941) was an English tennis player who competed in the 1908 Summer Olympics. Simond was born in Marylebone. In 1908 he won the silver medal in the men's indoor doubles competition together with his partner George Caridia.
