= 1904 in sports =

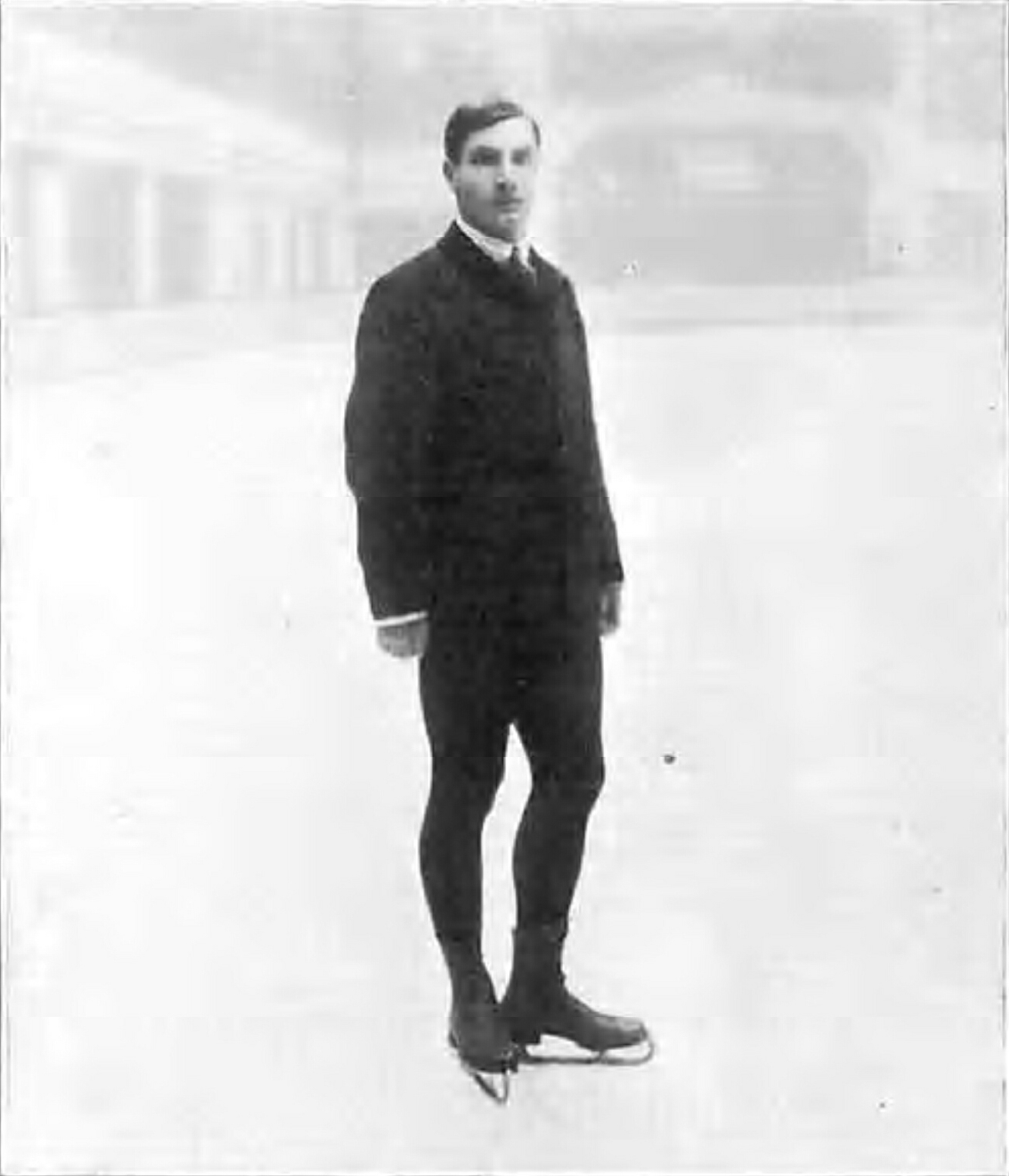
Ulrich Salchow of Sweden won his fourth successive World Figure Skating Championship title in 1904

1904 in sports describes the year's events in world sport.

== American football ==
College championship

- College football national championship – Penn Quakers

Professional championships

- Ohio League championship – Massillon Tigers
- Western Pennsylvania Championship – Latrobe Athletic Association

Events

- 15 November — Canton Athletic Club (later renamed the Canton Bulldogs) is first established.

== Association football ==
International

- World governing body FIFA is founded. The football associations of England, Scotland, Wales and Ireland do not join at this time.

Austria

- Formation of the Austrian Football Association (Österreichischer Fußball-Bund or ÖFB)

Brazil

- Botafogo de Futebol e Regatas was founded in Rio de Janeiro.

England

- The Football League – The Wednesday 47 points, Manchester City 44, Everton 43, Newcastle United 42, Aston Villa 41, Sunderland 39
- FA Cup final – Manchester City 1–0 Bolton Wanderers at Crystal Palace, London.

Germany

- National Championship – competition is annulled by the DFB following a protest by Karlsruher FV that matches have not been played on neutral grounds as stipulated by the rules.

Portugal

- Benfica founded in Lisbon as the Grupo Sport Lisboa. In 1908, it merges with SC de Benfica to form Sport Lisboa e Benfica (SL Benfica).

Scotland

- Scottish Football League – Third Lanark
- Scottish Cup final – Celtic 3–2 Rangers at Hampden Park

Sweden

- Formation of the Swedish Football Association (Svenska Fotbollförbundet or SvFF)

== Athletics ==
- Michael Spring wins the eighth running of the Boston Marathon.

== Australian rules football ==
VFL Premiership

- Fitzroy wins the 8th VFL Premiership – Fitzroy 9.7 (61) d Carlton 5.7 (37) at Melbourne Cricket Ground (MCG)

== Baseball ==
World Series

- NL champion New York Giants refuses to participate in the 1904 World Series. Boston Americans repeat as American League champions.

Events

- 5 May — Cy Young of Boston Americans pitches a perfect game, the second of his three no-hitters. He goes on to complete 24 hitless innings, still the record, and 45 scoreless innings, a record broken by Jack Coombs in 1910
- Duluth White Sox wins the Northern League championship

== Boxing ==
Events

- 29 April — Barbados Joe Walcott meets Dixie Kid to defend the World Welterweight Championship and, though well on top, is disqualified by the referee after 20 rounds for an alleged foul. Kid claims the title but it is subsequently discovered that the referee has bet on Kid to win and so Kid's claim is widely disregarded.
- 30 September — Walcott meets World Lightweight Champion Joe Gans in a non-title fight which is scored a draw after 20 rounds.
- 17 October — Joe Bowker (England) challenges Frankie Neil in London for the World Bantamweight Championship and wins over 20 rounds, the first non-American to hold this title.
- 31 October — Joe Gans meets Jimmy Britt in San Francisco to defend the World Lightweight Championship. Britt knocks Gans down four times but, after the last one in the fifth round, he hits Gans again before he has stood up and is disqualified for the foul. Afterwards, Gans vacates the title which is awarded to Britt. Two years later, Gans will claim that the fight has been fixed by his and Britt's managers.
- 31 December — during a New Year celebration, Walcott accidentally shoots himself in the hand to effectively ending his days as a top prizefighter. While he will return to the ring in 1906 (losing his welterweight title in the process), he never regains his old form and loses most of his subsequent fights.

Lineal world champions

- World Heavyweight Championship – James J. Jeffries
- World Light Heavyweight Championship – Bob Fitzsimmons
- World Middleweight Championship – Tommy Ryan
- World Welterweight Championship – Barbados Joe Walcott
- World Lightweight Championship – Joe Gans → Jimmy Britt
- World Featherweight Championship – Abe Attell
- World Bantamweight Championship – Frankie Neil → Joe Bowker

== Canadian Football ==
- In the ORFU, the value of a try/touchdown is increased to five points, while a field goal is now only worth one.
- The number of teams in the ORFU increases to six, divided into two districts.
- The QRFU requires teams to gain 5 yards on a 3rd down to keep possession of the football.
- The ongoing rule dispute results in no Dominion Championship being played in 1904.
- Ontario Rugby Football Union - Hamilton Tigers
- Quebec Rugby Football Union - Ottawa College
- Manitoba Rugby Football Union - Winnipeg Rowing Club
- Intercollegiate Rugby Football Union - Queen's University

== Cricket ==
England

- County Championship – Lancashire
- Minor Counties Championship – Northamptonshire
- Most runs – Tom Hayward 3170 @ 54.65 (HS 203)
- Most wickets – J T Hearne 145 @ 18.84 (BB 8–49)
- Wisden Cricketers of the Year – Bernard Bosanquet, Ernest Halliwell, James Hallows, Percy Perrin, Reggie Spooner

Australia

- Sheffield Shield – New South Wales
- Most runs – Victor Trumper 990 @ 55.00 (HS 185*)
- Most wickets – Wilfred Rhodes 65 @ 16.23 (BB 8–68)

India

- Bombay Presidency – Parsees

South Africa

- Currie Cup – Western Province

West Indies

- Inter-Colonial Tournament – Trinidad and Tobago

== Cycling ==
Tour de France

- Henri Cornet (France) wins the Tour de France

== Figure skating ==
World Figure Skating Championships

- World Men's Champion – Ulrich Salchow (Sweden)

== Golf ==
Major tournaments

- British Open – Jack White
- U.S. Open – Willie Anderson

Other tournaments

- British Amateur – Walter Travis
- US Amateur – Chandler Egan

== Horse racing ==
England

- Grand National – Moifaa
- 1,000 Guineas Stakes – Pretty Polly
- 2,000 Guineas Stakes – St. Amant
- The Derby – St. Amant
- The Oaks – Pretty Polly
- St. Leger Stakes – Pretty Polly

Australia

- Melbourne Cup – Acrasia

Canada

- King's Plate – Sapper

Ireland

- Irish Grand National – Ascetic's Silver
- Irish Derby Stakes – Royal Arch

USA

- Kentucky Derby – Elwood
- Preakness Stakes – Bryn Mawr
- Belmont Stakes – Delhi

== Ice hockey ==
Stanley Cup

- January — Ottawa Hockey Club defeats Winnipeg Rowing Club to defend the Stanley Cup in a Cup challenge.
- February — Stanley Cup champion Ottawa Hockey Club withdraws from the Canadian Amateur Hockey League (CAHL) over a demand by the league to replay a game.
- February — Ottawa defeats Toronto Marlboros in a Cup challenge.
- 2 March — Ottawa plays Montreal Wanderers to a 5–5 tie in a Cup challenge, but Montreal refuses terms of continuation of series and defaults.
- March — Quebec Bulldogs win the CAHL championship and demand the Stanley Cup, but the trustees rule the Cup stays with Ottawa. Quebec refuses to play Ottawa in a challenge.
- March — Ottawa defeats the Brandon Wheat Kings 2 games to 0 in a Cup challenge.
- 18 December — Dawson City Nuggets begin a 4,000 mile journey by dog sled to play the Ottawa Hockey Club in a Stanley Cup challenge scheduled for 13 January 1905.

== Motor racing ==
Gordon Bennett Cup

- Fifth running of the Gordon Bennett Cup takes place in the Taunus mountains in Germany. The winner is Léon Théry (France) driving a Richard-Brasier.

Circuit des Ardennes

- The third Circuit des Ardennes is run on 25 July over 591.255 km (118.251 km x 5 laps) in the vicinity of Bastogne. The winner is George Heath (USA) driving a Panhard-Levassor 70 hp in a time of 5:30:49.

Vanderbilt Cup

- William Kissam Vanderbilt II launches the Vanderbilt Cup at a course set out in Nassau County, New York on Long Island. It creates controversy in New York with numerous attempts made, including legal action, to try to prevent it taking place. The inaugural race is run over a 30.24 miles (48.7 km) course of winding dirt roads through Nassau County. Several European drivers with experience of the Gordon Bennett Cup take part and the event is a huge commercial success. The winner is George Heath (USA) driving a Panhard-Levassor 70 hp.

== Olympic Games ==
1904 Summer Olympics

- The third Summer Olympics took place in St. Louis, Missouri, United States.
- Lacrosse was played at the Olympics for the first time.
- The first Africans participated in the Olympics: two Tswana athletes competed at the St. Louis Games in the marathon.
- The United States won the most medals (239) and the most gold medals (78).

== Rowing ==
The Boat Race

- 26 March — Cambridge wins the 61st Oxford and Cambridge Boat Race

== Rugby league ==
England

- Championship – Bradford FC
- Challenge Cup final – Halifax 8–3 Warrington at The Willows, Salford
- Lancashire League Championship – not contested
- Yorkshire League Championship – not contested

== Rugby union ==
Home Nations Championship

- 22nd Home Nations Championship series is won by Scotland

== Speed skating ==
Speed Skating World Championships

- Men's All-round Champion – Sigurd Mathisen (Norway)

== Tennis ==
England

- Wimbledon Men's Singles Championship – Laurence Doherty (GB) defeats Frank Riseley (GB) 6–1 7–5 8–6
- Wimbledon Women's Singles Championship – Dorothea Douglass Lambert Chambers (GB) defeats Charlotte Cooper Sterry (GB) 6–0 6–3

France

- French Men's Singles Championship – Max Decugis (France) defeats André Vacherot (France) 6–1 9–7 6–8 6–1
- French Women's Singles Championship – Kate Gillou (France) defeats Françoise Masson (France): details unknown

USA

- American Men's Singles Championship – Holcombe Ward (USA) defeats William Clothier (USA) 10–8 6–4 9–7
- American Women's Singles Championship – May Sutton (USA) defeats Elisabeth Moore (USA) 6–1 6–2

Davis Cup

- 1904 International Lawn Tennis Challenge – British Isles 5–0 Belgium at Warple Road (grass) London, United Kingdom
