= 1905 in sports =

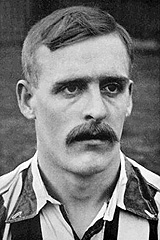
Alf Common: football's first £1,000 player

1905 in sports describes the year's events in world sport.

== American football ==
College championship

- College football national championship – Chicago Maroons

Professional championships

- Ohio League championship – Massillon Tigers
- Western Pennsylvania Championship – Latrobe Athletic Association

Events

- The college football season is blighted by a spate of serious injuries, some fatal, and U S President Theodore Roosevelt calls upon the game's authorities to reform it.
- 6 October — Night-time football is played west of the Mississippi for the first time (see 1905 Cooper vs. Fairmount football game)
- December 25 — An experimental game using new rules is played in Wichita, Kansas, under the supervision of John H. Outland. Proposed rules changes include the addition of the forward pass.

== Association football ==
Argentina

- Boca Juniors was founded in Buenos Aires

England

- The Football League – Newcastle United 48 points, Everton 47, Manchester City 46, Aston Villa 42, Sunderland 40, Sheffield United 40
- 1905 FA Cup final – Aston Villa 2–0 Newcastle United at Crystal Palace, London.
- 14 March — foundation of Chelsea F.C.
- Alf Common becomes the first player ever to be transferred for £1,000 when he moves from Sunderland to Middlesbrough
- The First and Second Divisions are expanded from eighteen to twenty teams each ahead of the 1905–06 season, bringing the total number of League clubs to 40. New clubs elected to the league include Chelsea, Hull City and Leeds City.

Germany

- National Championship – Union Berlin 2–0 Karlsruher FV at Köln-Merheim

Scotland

- Scottish Football League – Celtic
- Scottish Cup final – Third Lanark 3–1 Rangers at Hampden Park (replay, following 0–0 draw at Hampden Park)

Turkey

- Galatasaray founded in Istanbul

== Athletics ==
- Frederick Lorz wins the ninth running of the Boston Marathon.

== Australian rules football ==
VFL Premiership

- Fitzroy wins the 9th VFL Premiership: Fitzroy 4.6 (30) d Collingwood 2.5 (17) at Melbourne Cricket Ground (MCG)

== Baseball ==
World Series

- 9–14 October — New York Giants (NL) defeats Philadelphia Athletics (AL) by 4 games to 1 in the 1905 World Series, which is the first organized by the modern National and American Leagues.

== Boxing ==
Events

- 13 May — James J. Jeffries announces his retirement from boxing and relinquishes the World Heavyweight Championship title
- 3 July — Jeffries referees the Marvin Hart v. Jack Root fight at Reno and "awards" his title to Hart, who has won by a 12th-round knockout. Besides winning this bout, Hart has earlier in the year defeated Jack Johnson over 20 rounds at San Francisco. Hart holds the title until 1906.
- 28 July — Frankie Neil becomes the new world bantamweight boxing champion by defeating title holder Harry Tenny in a 25-round bout.
- 9 September — Battling Nelson defeats Jimmy Britt by an eighteenth-round knockout to win the World Lightweight Championship.
- 20 December — Bob Fitzsimmons loses his World Light Heavyweight Championship to Philadelphia Jack O'Brien on a 13th-round technical knockout in San Francisco. O'Brien effectively relinquishes the title soon afterwards and it remains vacant until 1914.

Lineal world champions

- World Heavyweight Championship – James J. Jeffries → vacant → Marvin Hart
- World Light Heavyweight Championship – Bob Fitzsimmons → Philadelphia Jack O'Brien → vacant
- World Middleweight Championship – Tommy Ryan
- World Welterweight Championship – Barbados Joe Walcott
- World Lightweight Championship – Jimmy Britt → Battling Nelson
- World Featherweight Championship – Abe Attell
- World Bantamweight Championship – Joe Bowker → vacant → Jimmy Walsh

== Canadian Football ==
- Due to the CIRFU and QRFU refusing to adopt the Burnside Rules, championship games between the two leagues would use one set of rules for the first half and the other set of rules for the second half.
- The QRFU adopts fifteen minute quarters.
- The CIRFU changes the 3rd down distance to 10 yards.
- Toronto and the Toronto Argonauts merged.
- Ontario Rugby Football Union - Hamilton Tigers
- Quebec Rugby Football Union - Ottawa Rough Riders
- Manitoba Rugby Football Union - Winnipeg Rowing Club
- Intercollegiate Rugby Football Union - University of Toronto
- Dominion Championship - Toronto Varsity defeats Ottawa Rough Riders 11–9

== Cricket ==
England

- County Championship – Yorkshire
- Minor Counties Championship – Norfolk
- Most runs – C B Fry 2801 @ 70.02 (HS 233)
- Most wickets – Walter Lees 193 @ 18.01 (BB 9–81)
- Wisden Cricketers of the Year – David Denton, Walter Lees, George Thompson, Joe Vine, Levi Wright

Australia

- Sheffield Shield – New South Wales
- Most runs – Warwick Armstrong 460 @ 57.50 (HS 200)
- Most wickets – Frederick Collins 27 @ 23.37 (BB 6–64)

India

- Bombay Presidency – Parsees

South Africa

- Currie Cup – not contested

West Indies

- Inter-Colonial Tournament – not contested

== Cycling ==
Tour de France

- Louis Trousselier (France) wins the 3rd Tour de France

== Figure skating ==
World Figure Skating Championships

- World Men's Champion – Ulrich Salchow (Sweden)

== Golf ==
Major tournaments

- British Open – James Braid
- U.S. Open – Willie Anderson

Other tournaments

- British Amateur – Gordon Barry
- US Amateur – Chandler Egan

== Horse racing ==
England

- Grand National – Kirkland
- 1,000 Guineas Stakes – Cherry Lass
- 2,000 Guineas Stakes – Vedas
- The Derby – Cicero
- The Oaks – Cherry Lass
- St. Leger Stakes – Challacombe

Australia

- Melbourne Cup – Blue Spec

Canada

- King's Plate – Inferno

Ireland

- Irish Grand National – Red Lad
- Irish Derby Stakes – Flax Park

USA

- Kentucky Derby – Agile
- Preakness Stakes – Cairngorm
- Belmont Stakes – Tanya

== Ice hockey ==
Stanley Cup

- Ottawa Hockey Club wins a challenge series against the Dawson City Nuggets of Dawson City, Yukon two games to nil. The Dawson club has travelled over 4,000 miles by dog sled, boat and train to play the Silver Seven but are outmatched. Frank McGee, incensed by comments from the Dawson squad, scores 14 goals as Ottawa wins the second game 23–2.
- Ottawa wins the Federal Amateur Hockey League (FAHL) championship to defend the Stanley Cup.
- Ottawa defeats Rat Portage Thistles 2 games to one in a Stanley Cup challenge.

Events

- 9 December — Eastern Canada Amateur Hockey Association (ECAHA) is formed from teams in the Canadian Amateur Hockey League (CAHL) and the FAHL. Stanley Cup champion Ottawa and Montreal Wanderers join from FAHL and Montreal, Montreal Shamrocks, Montreal Victorias and Quebec Bulldogs join from the CAHL.

== Lacrosse ==
Events

- The Intercollegiate Lacrosse Association (ILA) is replaced by the Intercollegiate Lacrosse League, which will be renamed the U.S. Intercollegiate Lacrosse Association (USILA) in 1929.

== Motor racing ==
Gordon Bennett Cup

- Sixth and final running of the Gordon Bennett Cup takes place in France on the Charade Circuit, then known as the Circuit d'Auvergne, at Clermont-Ferrand. As road racing has been banned in France, this is the first time the trophy is contested on a circuit. The winner for the second successive year is Léon Théry (France) driving a Richard-Brasier.

Ardennes Circuit

- The fourth Circuit des Ardennes is run on 7 August over 591.255 km (118.251 km x 5 laps) in the vicinity of Bastogne. The winner is Victor Hémery (France) driving a Darracq 80 hp in a time of 5:58:32.

Vanderbilt Cup

- The second Vanderbilt Cup is run on 14 October over 455.430 km (45.543 km x 10 laps) on Long Island. The winner is Victor Hémery (France) driving a Darracq 80 hp in a time of 4:36:08.

Shelsley Walsh Speed Hill Climb

- First running of the Shelsley Walsh Speed Hill Climb on August 12, still run annually on the same course.

== Rowing ==
The Boat Race

- 1 April — Oxford wins the 62nd Oxford and Cambridge Boat Race

== Rugby league ==
England

- Championship – Oldham
- Challenge Cup final – Warrington 6–0 Hull Kingston Rovers at Headingley Rugby Stadium, Leeds
- Lancashire League Championship – not contested
- Yorkshire League Championship – not contested
- County cup competitions introduced in both Lancashire and Yorkshire ahead of the 1905–06 season. These are knockout competitions in the same format as the Challenge Cup except for their regional character.

== Rugby union ==
Home Nations Championship

- 23rd Home Nations Championship series is won by Wales
- December 16 – The "Match of the Century" is played between Wales and New Zealand at Cardiff Arms Park.

== Speed skating ==
Speed Skating World Championships

- Men's All-round Champion
- January 22 - Dutchman Coen de Koning wins the 1,500m, 5,000m & 10,000m at World Allround Speed Skating Championships in Groningen, Netherlands to become 2nd Dutchman to win a world title

== Tennis ==
Events

- Inaugural Australian Championship is held, but for men only

Australia

- Australian Men's Singles Championship – Rodney Heath (Australia) defeats Arthur Curtis (Australia) 4–6 6–3 6–4 6–4

England

- Wimbledon Men's Singles Championship – Laurence Doherty (GB) defeats Norman Brookes (Australia) 8–6 6–2 6–4
- Wimbledon Women's Singles Championship – May Sutton Bundy (USA) defeats Dorothea Douglass Lambert Chambers (GB) 6–3 6–4

France

- French Men's Singles Championship – Maurice Germot (France) defeats André Vacherot (France): details unknown
- French Women's Singles Championship – Kate Gillou (France) defeats Yvonne de Pfeffel (France) 6–0 11–9

USA

- American Men's Singles Championship – Beals Wright (USA) defeats Holcombe Ward (USA) 6–2 6–1 11–9
- American Women's Singles Championship – Elisabeth Moore (USA) defeats Helen Homans (USA) 6–4 5–7 6–1

Davis Cup

- 1905 International Lawn Tennis Challenge – British Isles 5–0 United States at Queen's Club (grass) London, United Kingdom
