= 1905 in tennis =

This page covers all the important events in the sport of tennis in 1905. It provides the results of notable tournaments throughout the year on both the men's and women's ILTF tennis circuits.

== Australian Open ==
Category	Champion(s)	Finalist(s)	Score
Singles	(Australia) Rodney Heath	(Australia) Albert Curtis	4–6, 6–3, 6–4, 6–4
Doubles	(United Kingdom of Great Britain and Ireland) Randolph Lycett (Australia) Tom Tachell	(Australia) E.T. Barnard (Australia) Basil Spence	11–9, 8–6, 1–6, 4–6, 6–1

== French Open ==
Not a Grand Slam event.

== Wimbledon ==
Category	Champion(s)	Finalist(s)	Score
Men's singles	(United Kingdom of Great Britain and Ireland) Laurence Doherty	(Australia) Norman Brookes	8–6, 6–2, 6–4
Women's singles	(United States) May Sutton	(United Kingdom of Great Britain and Ireland) Dorothea Douglass	6–3, 6–4
Men's doubles	(United Kingdom of Great Britain and Ireland) Laurence Doherty (United Kingdom of Great Britain and Ireland) Reginald Doherty	(United Kingdom of Great Britain and Ireland) Frank Riseley (United Kingdom of Great Britain and Ireland) Sydney Smith	6–2, 6–4, 6–8, 6–3

== US Open ==
Category	Champion(s)	Finalist(s)	Score
Men's singles	(United States) Beals Wright	(United States) Holcombe Ward	6–2, 6–1, 11–9
Women's singles	(United States) Elisabeth Moore	(United States) Helen Homans	6–4, 5–7, 6–1
Men's doubles	(United States) Holcombe Ward (United States) Beals Wright	(United States) Fred Alexander (United States) Harold Hackett	6–4, 6–4, 6–4
Women's doubles	(United States) Helen Homans (United States) Carrie Neely	(United States) Marjorie Oberteuffer (United States) Virginia Maule	6–0, 6–1
Mixed doubles	(United States) Augusta Schultz (United States) Clarence Hobart	(United States) Elisabeth Moore (Australia) Edward Dewhurst	6–2, 6–4
