= 1904 in tennis =

This page covers all the important events in the sport of tennis in 1904. It provides the results of notable tournaments throughout the year on both the men's and women's ILTF tennis circuits.

== Australian Open ==
No event.

== French Open ==
Not a Grand Slam event.

== Wimbledon ==
Category	Champion(s)	Finalist(s)	Score
Men's singles	(United Kingdom) Laurence Doherty	(United Kingdom) Frank Riseley	6–1, 7–5, 8–6
Women's singles	(United Kingdom) Dorothea Douglass	(United Kingdom) Charlotte Sterry	6–0, 6–3
Men's doubles	(United Kingdom) Laurence Doherty (United Kingdom) Reginald Doherty	(United Kingdom) Frank Riseley (United Kingdom) Sydney Smith	6–1, 6–2, 6–4

== US Open ==
Category	Champion(s)	Finalist(s)	Score
Men's singles	(United States) Holcombe Ward	(United States) William Clothier	10–8, 6–4, 9–7
Women's singles	(United States) May Sutton	(United States) Elisabeth Moore	6–1, 6–2
Men's doubles	(United States) Holcombe Ward (United States) Beals Wright	(United States) Kreigh Collins (United States) Raymond Little	1–6, 6–2, 3–6, 6–4, 6–1
Women's doubles	(United States) May Sutton (United States) Miriam Hall	(United States) Elisabeth Moore (United States) Carrie Neely	3–6, 6–3, 6–3
Mixed doubles	(United States) Elisabeth Moore (United States) Wylie Grant	(United States) May Sutton (United States) Trevanion Dallas	6–2, 6–1
