= 1904 Wimbledon Championships – Men's doubles =

Men's doubles
- 1904 Wimbledon Championships

Final
- Champions: (United Kingdom) Laurence Doherty (United Kingdom) Reginald Doherty
- Runners-up: (United Kingdom) Frank Riseley (United Kingdom) Sydney Smith
- Score: 6–1, 6–2, 6–4

Details
- Draw: 27
- Seeds: –

Events
Singles	men	women
Doubles	men	women
← 1903 ·	Wimbledon Championships	· 1905 →

Frank Riseley and Sydney Smith defeated George Caridia and Arthur Gore 6–3, 6–4, 6–3 in the All Comers' Final, but the reigning champions Laurence Doherty and Reginald Doherty defeated Riseley and Smith 6–1, 6–2, 6–4 in the challenge round to win the gentlemen's doubles tennis title at the 1904 Wimbledon Championships.

== Draw ==
=== Key ===
- Q = Qualifier
- WC = Wild card
- LL = Lucky loser
- Alt = Alternate
- SE = Special exempt
- PR = Protected ranking
- ITF = ITF entry
- JE = Junior exempt
- w/o = Walkover
- r = Retired
- d = Defaulted
- SR = Special ranking

=== Challenge round ===
Challenge Round
(United Kingdom) Frank Riseley (United Kingdom) Sydney Smith	1	2	4
(United Kingdom) Laurence Doherty (United Kingdom) Reginald Doherty	6	6	6

=== All comers' finals ===
Semifinals
(United Kingdom) George Caridia (United Kingdom) Arthur Gore	6	7	6
(Belgium) William le Maire de Warzée (Belgium) Paul de Borman	2	5	1
(United Kingdom) George Greville (United Kingdom) Major Ritchie	1	5	1
(United Kingdom) Frank Riseley (United Kingdom) Sydney Smith	6	7	6

Final
(United Kingdom) George Caridia (United Kingdom) Arthur Gore	3	4	3
(United Kingdom) Frank Riseley (United Kingdom) Sydney Smith	6	6	6

=== Top half ===
First round
(United Kingdom) HR Fussell (United Kingdom) H Pollard	8	6	6
(United Kingdom) Arnold Herschell (United Kingdom) CH Mounsey	6	0	4
(United Kingdom) Lionel Escombe (United Kingdom) Robert Hough	6	3	4	6	6
(United Kingdom) Arthur Norris (United Kingdom) Henry Wilson-Fox	4	6	6	1	3
(United Kingdom) William Crawley (New Zealand) Anthony Wilding
(Austria) Rolf Kinzl (Austria) Kurt von Wessely	w/o
(United Kingdom) Clement Cazalet (United Kingdom) George Hillyard	6	6	6
(United Kingdom) Fritz Goldberg; AL Irvine	4	1	1
(Belgium) William le Maire de Warzée (Belgium) Paul de Borman	6	7	7
(United Kingdom) ER Clarke (United Kingdom) EW Timmis	2	5	5
(United Kingdom) Sydney Adams (United Kingdom) WH Jackson	6	6	6
(United Kingdom) Arthur Cronin (United Kingdom) EJ Sampson	2	3	1

Second round
(United Kingdom) George Caridia (United Kingdom) Arthur Gore	6	6	6
(United Kingdom) Archibald McNair (United Kingdom) Roderick McNair	4	2	2
(United Kingdom) HR Fussell (United Kingdom) H Pollard	3	6	6	6
(United Kingdom) L Escombe (United Kingdom) R Hough	6	0	4	4
(United Kingdom) W Crawley (New Zealand) A Wilding	2	1	1
(United Kingdom) C Cazalet (United Kingdom) G Hillyard	6	6	6
(Belgium) W le Maire de Warzée (Belgium) P de Borman	7	4	7	2	6
(United Kingdom) S Adams (United Kingdom) WH Jackson	5	6	5	6	3

Quarterfinals
(United Kingdom) G Caridia (United Kingdom) A Gore	6	7	4	6
(United Kingdom) HR Fussell (United Kingdom) H Pollard	2	5	6	2
(United Kingdom) C Cazalet (United Kingdom) G Hillyard	6	4	7	6	1
(Belgium) W le Maire de Warzée (Belgium) P de Borman	2	6	9	4	6

Semifinals
(United Kingdom) G Caridia (United Kingdom) A Gore	6	7	6
(Belgium) W le Maire de Warzée (Belgium) P de Borman	2	5	1

The nationality of AL Irvine is unknown.

=== Bottom half ===
First round
(United Kingdom) Frank Pearce (United Kingdom) Ernest Wills	3	3	6	6	7
(United Kingdom) George Mewburn (United Kingdom) Frederick Plaskitt	6	6	1	2	5
(United Kingdom) George Greville (United Kingdom) Major Ritchie	6	6	6
(United Kingdom) JB Dufall (United Kingdom) Frank Pearson	2	3	4
(United Kingdom) Norman Marrett (United Kingdom) Albert Prebble	6	6	6
(United Kingdom) John Flavelle (United Kingdom) Evan Gwynne-Evans	2	3	4
(United Kingdom) Charles Simond (United Kingdom) George Simond	8	6	4	2	6
(United Kingdom) George Ball-Greene (United Kingdom) Wilberforce Eaves	6	3	6	6	4
(United Kingdom) Brame Hillyard (United Kingdom) Harold Mahony	8	6	6
(United Kingdom) Charlie Finlason (United Kingdom) David Hawes	6	1	3

Second round
(United Kingdom) F Pearce (United Kingdom) E Wills	3	3	1
(United Kingdom) G Greville (United Kingdom) M Ritchie	6	6	6
(United Kingdom) N Marrett (United Kingdom) A Prebble	4	6	4	6	6
(United Kingdom) C Simond (United Kingdom) G Simond	6	1	6	3	1
(United Kingdom) B Hillyard (United Kingdom) H Mahony	3	6	6	6
(United Kingdom) Herbert Baddeley (United Kingdom) Wilfred Baddeley	6	1	4	3
(United Kingdom) Frank Riseley (United Kingdom) Sydney Smith	6	4	6	6
(United Kingdom) Alfred Beamish (United Kingdom) T Dudley	1	6	2	0

Quarterfinals
(United Kingdom) G Greville (United Kingdom) M Ritchie	2	6	6	7
(United Kingdom) N Marrett (United Kingdom) A Prebble	6	3	1	5
(United Kingdom) B Hillyard (United Kingdom) H Mahony	3	7	1	1
(United Kingdom) F Riseley (United Kingdom) S Smith	6	5	6	6

Semifinals
(United Kingdom) G Greville (United Kingdom) M Ritchie	1	5	1
(United Kingdom) F Riseley (United Kingdom) S Smith	6	7	6
