= 1905 Wimbledon Championships – Men's doubles =

Men's doubles
- 1905 Wimbledon Championships

Final
- Champions: (United Kingdom) Laurence Doherty (United Kingdom) Reginald Doherty
- Runners-up: (United Kingdom) Frank Riseley (United Kingdom) Sydney Smith
- Score: 6–2, 6–4, 6–8, 6–3

Details
- Draw: 31
- Seeds: –

Events
Singles	men	women
Doubles	men	women
← 1904 ·	Wimbledon Championships	· 1906 →

Frank Riseley and Sydney Smith defeated Norman Brookes and Alfred Dunlop 6–2, 1–6, 6–2, 6–3 in the All Comers' Final, but the reigning champions Laurence Doherty and Reginald Doherty defeated Riseley and Smith 6–2, 6–4, 6–8, 6–3 in the challenge round to win the gentlemen's doubles tennis title at the 1905 Wimbledon Championships.

== Draw ==
=== Key ===
- Q = Qualifier
- WC = Wild card
- LL = Lucky loser
- Alt = Alternate
- SE = Special exempt
- PR = Protected ranking
- ITF = ITF entry
- JE = Junior exempt
- w/o = Walkover
- r = Retired
- d = Defaulted
- SR = Special ranking

=== Challenge round ===
Challenge Round
(United Kingdom) Frank Riseley (United Kingdom) Sydney Smith	2	4	8	3
(United Kingdom) Laurence Doherty (United Kingdom) Reginald Doherty	6	6	6	6

=== All comers' finals ===
Semifinals
(Australia) Norman Brookes (Australia) Alfred Dunlop	6	6	2	6
(United States) William Clothier (United States) William Larned	4	0	6	1
(United States) Holcombe Ward (United States) Beals Wright	6	3	2	7
(United Kingdom) Frank Riseley (United Kingdom) Sydney Smith	2	6	6	9

Final
(Australia) Norman Brookes (Australia) Alfred Dunlop	2	6	2	3
(United Kingdom) Frank Riseley (United Kingdom) Sydney Smith	6	1	6	6

=== Top half ===
First round
(Australia) Norman Brookes (Australia) Alfred Dunlop	6	6	8
(United Kingdom) Charles Gouldesborough (United States) ER Paterson	2	2	6
(United Kingdom) Clement Cazalet (United Kingdom) George Hillyard	1	6	6	6
(United Kingdom) E Morris Hall (United Kingdom) TD Stoward	6	3	1	2
(United Kingdom) John Flavelle (South Africa) Harold Kitson	6	6	6
(United Kingdom) F Leaver (Germany) Ferdinand Uhl	2	4	1
(United Kingdom) Roderick McNair (United Kingdom) Alfred Sterry
(United Kingdom) Sydney Adams (Belgium) William le Maire de Warzée	w/o
(United Kingdom) George Caridia (United Kingdom) Arthur Gore	3	6	7	6
(United Kingdom) Charlie Finlason (United Kingdom) CH Mounsey	6	3	5	0
(United Kingdom) George Ball-Greene (United Kingdom) Wilberforce Eaves	6	6	7
(United Kingdom) Charles Simond (United Kingdom) JB Ward	2	2	5
(United States) William Clothier (United States) William Larned	6	6	6
(Denmark) Thomas Hillerup (Denmark) Erik Larsen	3	1	1
(United Kingdom) ER Clarke (United Kingdom) EW Timmis	6	6	4	5	9
(United Kingdom) Arthur Norris (United Kingdom) Henry Wilson-Fox	2	2	6	7	7

Second round
(Australia) N Brookes (Australia) A Dunlop	4	6	6	4	6
(United Kingdom) C Cazalet (United Kingdom) G Hillyard	6	2	3	6	4
(United Kingdom) J Flavelle (South Africa) H Kitson	5	6	8	6
(United Kingdom) R McNair (United Kingdom) A Sterry	7	3	6	4
(United Kingdom) G Caridia (United Kingdom) A Gore	5	6	6	4
(United Kingdom) G Ball-Greene (United Kingdom) W Eaves	7	8	4	6
(United States) W Clothier (United States) W Larned	6	6	6
(United Kingdom) ER Clarke (United Kingdom) EW Timmis	2	3	3

Quarterfinals
(Australia) N Brookes (Australia) A Dunlop	6	6	6
(United Kingdom) J Flavelle (South Africa) H Kitson	2	2	1
(United Kingdom) G Ball-Greene (United Kingdom) W Eaves	6	3	2	6	2
(United States) W Clothier (United States) W Larned	2	6	6	4	6

Semifinals
(Australia) N Brookes (Australia) A Dunlop	6	6	2	6
(United States) W Clothier (United States) W Larned	4	0	6	1

=== Bottom half ===
First round
(United States) Holcombe Ward (United States) Beals Wright	9	6	6
(United Kingdom) Evan Gwynne Evans (United Kingdom) Theodore Mavrogordato	7	3	4
(United Kingdom) Frank Pearce (United Kingdom) Kenneth Powell	6	3	6	3	6
(United Kingdom) Walter Bailey (United Kingdom) WP Groser	1	6	2	6	4
(United States) K Doust (Australia) Barney Murphy	6	6	6
(United Kingdom) AW Perceval (United Kingdom) FW Perceval	1	2	1
(United Kingdom) Herbert Baddeley (United Kingdom) Wilfred Baddeley	3	6	6	6
(United Kingdom) Lionel Escombe (United Kingdom) Robert Hough	6	2	3	4
(United Kingdom) Alfred Beamish (United Kingdom) Henry Pollard	6	6	6
(United Kingdom) HJW Fosbery (United Kingdom) David Hawes	1	1	4
(United Kingdom) Frank Riseley (United Kingdom) Sydney Smith
(United Kingdom) Arthur Cronin (United Kingdom) Thomas Haydon	w/o
(New Zealand) Harry Parker (New Zealand) Anthony Wilding	7	3	6	6
(United Kingdom) Major Ritchie (United Kingdom) George Simond	5	6	3	4

Second round
(United States) H Ward (United States) B Wright
(United Kingdom) F Pearce (United Kingdom) K Powell	w/o
(United States) K Doust (Australia) B Murphy	7	4	7	2
(United Kingdom) H Baddeley (United Kingdom) W Baddeley	9	6	5	6
(United Kingdom) A Beamish (United Kingdom) H Pollard	3	1	1
(United Kingdom) F Riseley (United Kingdom) S Smith	6	6	6
(New Zealand) H Parker (New Zealand) A Wilding
(United Kingdom) Ernest Parton (United Kingdom) Frederick Plaskitt

Quarterfinals
(United States) H Ward (United States) B Wright	6	3	4	6	6
(United Kingdom) H Baddeley (United Kingdom) W Baddeley	2	6	6	1	1
(United Kingdom) F Riseley (United Kingdom) S Smith	7	6	6
(New Zealand) H Parker (New Zealand) A Wilding	5	3	2

Semifinals
(United States) H Ward (United States) B Wright	6	3	2	7
(United Kingdom) F Riseley (United Kingdom) S Smith	2	6	6	9
