= 1904 Grand National =

English steeplechase horse race

- Grand National
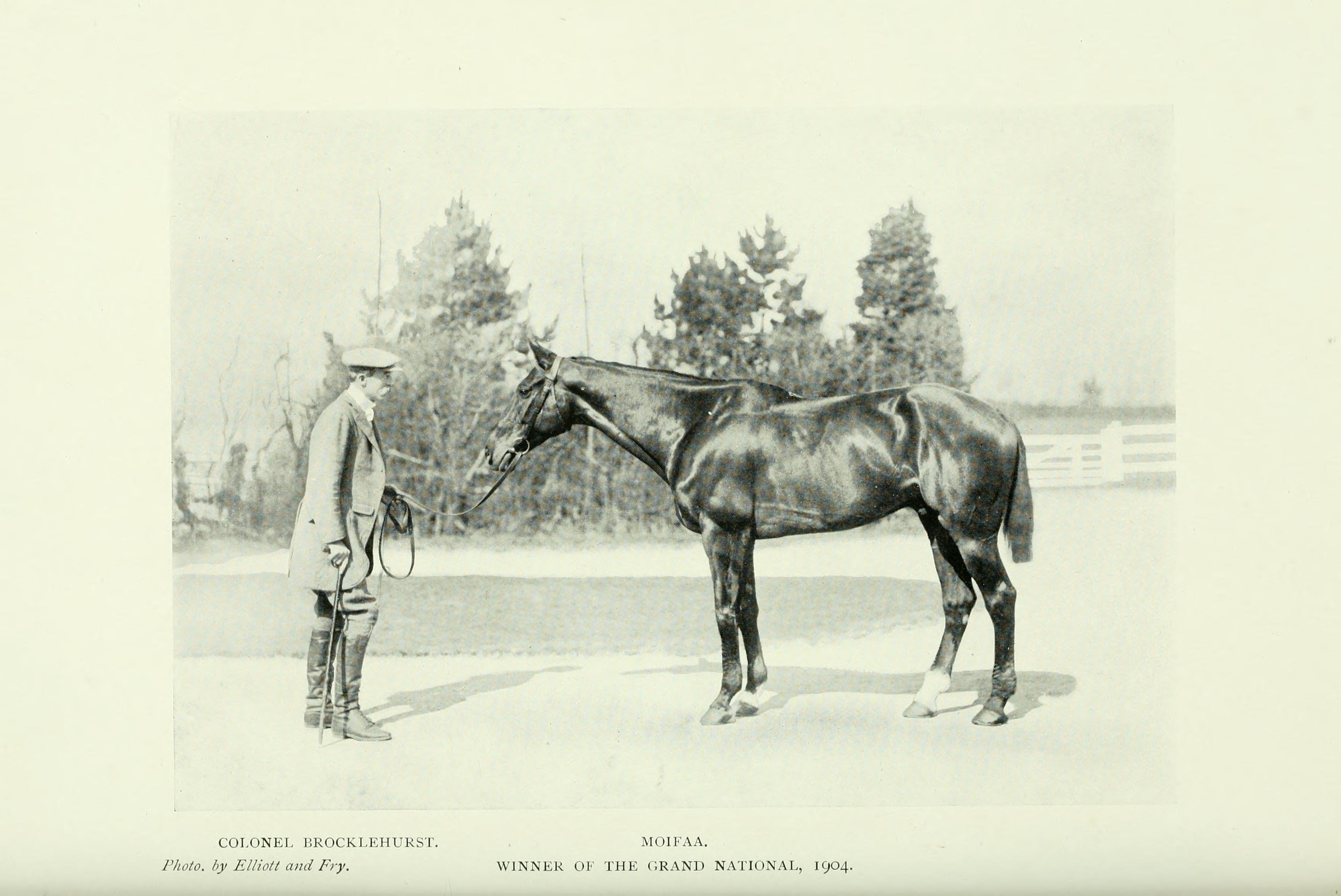
- Moifaa & Col. Brocklehurst (from Heroes and heroines of the Grand National)
- Location: Aintree
- Date: 25 March 1904
- Winning horse: (New Zealand) Moifaa
- Starting price: 25/1
- Jockey: Arthur Birch
- Trainer: W Hickey
- Owner: Spencer Gollan
- Conditions: Good to soft

The 1904 Grand National was the 66th renewal of the Grand National horse race that took place at Aintree Racecourse near Liverpool, England, on 25 March 1904.

The winner, Moifaa, was the first ever non-British/Irish winner of the race. He ran in the race again the following year, when he was owned by the King.

== Finishing Order ==
Position	Name	Jockey	Age	Handicap (st-lb)	SP	Distance
01	Moifaa	Arthur Birch	8	10-7	25/1	8 lengths
02	Kirkland	Frank Mason	8	10-10	100/7	Neck
03	The Gunner	Mr Joe Widger	7	10-4	25/1	
04	Shawn Aboo	A Waddington	6	10-1	100/1	
05	Robin Hood IV	A Magee	6	10-3	33/1	
06	Band of Hope	Patrick Cowley	8	9-13	40/1	
07	Napillah	Mr Arthur Wood	8	9-9	100/1	
08	Benvenir	Percy Woodland	8	9-10	20/1	
09	Manifesto	H Pigott	16	12-1	20/1	Last to complete

== Non-finishers ==
Fence	Name	Jockey	Age	Handicap (st-lb)	SP	Fate
03	Ambush II	Algy Anthony	10	12-6	7/2	Fell
29	The Pride of Mabestown	Mr Arthur Gordon	8	11-0	66/1	Fell
04	Inquisitor	Ernest Acres	9	10-11	9/1	Fell
05	Patlander	E Matthews	8	10-10	7/1	Fell
21	Deerslayer	James Phillips	8	10-10	25/1	Fell
24	Detail	Arthur Nightingall	?	?	100/14	Knocked Over
04	Cushendon	Dennis Morris	9	10-7	100/1	Fell
?	Knight of St Patrick	M Walsh	7	10-6	100/1	?
14	May King	Bill Dollery	8	10-5	25/1	Pulled Up
05	Comfit	Mr Frank Hartigan	6	10-4	33/1	Fell
06	Biology	David Read	7	10-1	33/1	Fell
05	Loch Lomond	Fred Freemantle	6	9-10	66/1	Fell
01	Railoff	R Sullivan	7	9-9	100/1	Fell
14	Old Town	Mr Harry Ripley	13	9-7	100/1	Pulled Up
14	Honeymoon II	W Lynn	9	9-7	50/1	Fell
05	Kiora	T McGuire	9	10-3	40/1	Fell
05	Hill of Bree	George Goswell	8	10-4	33/1	?

== Media coverage and aftermath ==
Shortly after his victory, a story emerged from the United States that the Grand National winner had come to England, the survivor of a ship wreck. The popularity of the story of the Robinson Crusoe Grand National winner gained weight through the decades and has been retold many times in books and on television regarding the race, with some versions telling of super equine feats of fifty mile swims to safety. While Moifaa is known to have sailed from Australia to England without incident, the story is not totally without a grain of truth as another New Zealand bred competitor in the 1904 National, Kiora had indeed been shipwrecked on its way to England. The horse had swum nearly half a mile through stormy seas to a reef before being rescued in a very exhausted state the following day.
