= 1903 Wimbledon Championships – Men's doubles =

Men's doubles
- 1903 Wimbledon Championships

Final
- Champions: (United Kingdom) Laurence Doherty (United Kingdom) Reginald Doherty
- Runners-up: (United Kingdom) Frank Riseley (United Kingdom) Sydney Smith
- Score: 6–4, 6–4, 6–4

Details
- Draw: 18
- Seeds: –

Events
Singles	men	women
Doubles	men	women
← 1902 ·	Wimbledon Championships	· 1904 →

Laurence Doherty and Reginald Doherty defeated Harold Mahony and Major Ritchie 8–6, 6–2, 6–2 in the All Comers' Final, and then defeated the reigning champions Frank Riseley and Sydney Smith 6–4, 6–4, 6–4 in the challenge round to win the gentlemen's doubles tennis title at the 1903 Wimbledon Championships.

== Draw ==
=== Key ===
- Q = Qualifier
- WC = Wild card
- LL = Lucky loser
- Alt = Alternate
- SE = Special exempt
- PR = Protected ranking
- ITF = ITF entry
- JE = Junior exempt
- w/o = Walkover
- r = Retired
- d = Defaulted
- SR = Special ranking

=== Challenge round ===
Challenge Round
(United Kingdom) Laurence Doherty (United Kingdom) Reginald Doherty	6	6	6
(United Kingdom) Frank Riseley (United Kingdom) Sydney Smith	4	4	4

=== All comers' finals ===
Semifinals
(United Kingdom) George Ball-Greene (United Kingdom) Wilberforce Eaves	2	1	1
(United Kingdom) Laurence Doherty (United Kingdom) Reginald Doherty	6	6	6
(United Kingdom) Harold Mahony (United Kingdom) Major Ritchie	6	6	6
(United Kingdom) George Mewburn (United Kingdom) Frederick Plaskitt	3	4	4

Final
(United Kingdom) Laurence Doherty (United Kingdom) Reginald Doherty	8	6	6
(United Kingdom) Harold Mahony (United Kingdom) Major Ritchie	6	2	2

=== Top half ===
First round
(United Kingdom) Charlie Finlason (United Kingdom) CH Mounsey	7	7	1	6
(United Kingdom) JK Frost (United Kingdom) Evelyn Mellor	5	5	6	3

Second round
(United Kingdom) George Ball-Greene (United Kingdom) Wilberforce Eaves	6	9	7
(United Kingdom) David Hawes (United Kingdom) GL Orme	4	7	5
(United States) Clarence Hobart (United Kingdom) Robert Hough	6	4	6	6
(United Kingdom) ER Clarke (United Kingdom) Arthur Cronin	1	6	1	0
(United Kingdom) William Martin (United Kingdom) R Williams	6	7	6
(United Kingdom) Lionel Escombe (United Kingdom) H White	3	5	3
(United Kingdom) Laurence Doherty (United Kingdom) Reginald Doherty	6	6	6
(United Kingdom) C Finlason (United Kingdom) CH Mounsey	2	2	1

Quarterfinals
(United Kingdom) G Ball-Greene (United Kingdom) W Eaves	9	6	2	8
(United States) C Hobart (United Kingdom) R Hough	7	4	6	6
(United Kingdom) W Martin (United Kingdom) R Williams	1	6	1
(United Kingdom) L Doherty (United Kingdom) R Doherty	6	8	6

Semifinals
(United Kingdom) G Ball-Greene (United Kingdom) W Eaves	2	1	1
(United Kingdom) L Doherty (United Kingdom) R Doherty	6	6	6

=== Bottom half ===
First round
(United Kingdom) Charles Simond (United Kingdom) George Simond	6	3	6	6
(United Kingdom) John Baker (United Kingdom) AH Greening	1	6	4	4

Second round
(United Kingdom) C Simond (United Kingdom) G Simond	6	4	5	6	6
(United Kingdom) George Caridia (United Kingdom) Arthur Gore	4	6	7	2	4
(United Kingdom) Harold Mahony (United Kingdom) Major Ritchie	6	6	4	6
(Netherlands) Broose van Groenou (Netherlands) Thomas Vreede	1	2	6	3
(United Kingdom) George Mewburn (United Kingdom) Frederick Plaskitt	6	3	6	6
(United Kingdom) Henry Pollard (United Kingdom) Albert Prebble	1	6	4	4
(United Kingdom) Arthur Norris (United Kingdom) Henry Wilson-Fox	6	6	6
(United Kingdom) Walter Bailey (United Kingdom) L Mossop	4	4	4

Quarterfinals
(United Kingdom) C Simond (United Kingdom) G Simond	6	3	4	2
(United Kingdom) H Mahony (United Kingdom) M Ritchie	3	6	6	6
(United Kingdom) G Mewburn (United Kingdom) F Plaskitt	6	6	6
(United Kingdom) A Norris (United Kingdom) H Wilson-Fox	4	4	4

Semifinals
(United Kingdom) H Mahony (United Kingdom) M Ritchie	6	6	6
(United Kingdom) G Mewburn (United Kingdom) F Plaskitt	3	4	4
