= 1905 Wimbledon Championships – Men's singles =

Men's singles
- 1905 Wimbledon Championships

Final
- Champion: (United Kingdom) Laurence Doherty
- Runner-up: (Australia) Norman Brookes
- Score: 8–6, 6–2, 6–4

Details
- Draw: 71
- Seeds: –

Events
Singles	men	women
Doubles	men	women
← 1904 ·	Wimbledon Championships	· 1906 →

Norman Brookes defeated Sydney Smith 1–6, 6–4, 6–1, 1–6, 7–5 in the All Comers' Final, but the reigning champion Laurence Doherty defeated Brookes 8–6, 6–2, 6–4 in the challenge round to win the gentlemen's singles tennis title at the 1905 Wimbledon Championships.

== Draw ==
=== Key ===
- Q = Qualifier
- WC = Wild card
- LL = Lucky loser
- Alt = Alternate
- SE = Special exempt
- PR = Protected ranking
- ITF = ITF entry
- JE = Junior exempt
- w/o = Walkover
- r = Retired
- d = Defaulted
- SR = Special ranking

=== Challenge round ===
Challenge Round
(Australia) Norman Brookes	6	2	4
(United Kingdom) Laurence Doherty	8	6	6

=== All comers' finals ===
Quarterfinals
(New Zealand) Anthony Wilding	6	2	2
(United Kingdom) Arthur Gore	8	6	6
(United Kingdom) Frank Riseley	3	2	4
(Australia) Norman Brookes	6	6	6
(United Kingdom) Sydney Smith	6	6	6
(United States) William Larned	2	4	4
(United Kingdom) Arthur Cronin	0	2	0
(United Kingdom) Major Ritchie	6	6	6

Semifinals
(United Kingdom) Arthur Gore	3	7	2
(Australia) Norman Brookes	6	9	6
(United Kingdom) Sydney Smith	6	3	6	4	6
(United Kingdom) Major Ritchie	0	6	4	6	1

Final
(Australia) Norman Brookes	1	6	6	1	7
(United Kingdom) Sydney Smith	6	4	1	6	5

=== Top half ===
==== Section 1 ====
First round

Second round
(United Kingdom) F Leaver	6	6	6
(Belgium) Fernand Houget	4	0	2
(New Zealand) Anthony Wilding	6	7	6
(Australia) Alfred Dunlop	4	5	4
(United States) William Clothier	6	6	6
(New Zealand) Alan Perceval	1	2	3
(United Kingdom) Robert Hough
(United Kingdom) B Nehru	w/o

Third round
(United Kingdom) F Leaver	4	0	1
(New Zealand) A Wilding	6	6	6
(United States) W Clothier	6	6	6
(United Kingdom) R Hough	2	3	4

Fourth round
(New Zealand) A Wilding	5	1	8	7	10
(United States) W Clothier	7	6	6	5	8

==== Section 2 ====
First round

Second round
(United Kingdom) Arthur Gore	6	1	6	6
(United Kingdom) Sydney Adams	3	6	0	1
(United Kingdom) Thomas Stoward	6	6	6
(United Kingdom) GM Thomas	3	2	1
(United Kingdom) Ernest Parton	4	6	6	5	6
(Belgium) William le Maire de Warzée	6	4	4	7	1
(United States) Beals Wright	6	6	6
(United Kingdom) Charles Simond	2	2	1

Third round
(United Kingdom) A Gore	6	6	6
(United Kingdom) TD Stoward	4	2	2
(United Kingdom) E Parton	2	4	3
(United States) B Wright	6	6	6

Fourth round
(United Kingdom) A Gore	6	7	6	6
(United States) B Wright	2	9	3	2

==== Section 3 ====
First round

Second round
(United Kingdom) EW Timmis
(Belgium) Paul de Borman	w/o
(United Kingdom) Frank Riseley	6	6	6
(United Kingdom) John Flavelle	2	4	4
(United Kingdom) Alfred Taylor	9	6	6
(United Kingdom) Evan Gwynne-Evans	7	3	3
(United Kingdom) Nigel Davidson
(Denmark) Thomas Hillerup	w/o

Third round
(United Kingdom) EW Timmis	2	2	1
(United Kingdom) F Riseley	6	6	6
(United Kingdom) A Taylor
(United Kingdom) N Davidson	w/o

Fourth round
(United Kingdom) F Riseley	6	6	6
(United Kingdom) A Taylor	1	0	2

==== Section 4 ====
First round
(United Kingdom) E Morris Hall	4	3	1
(United Kingdom) Lionel Escombe	6	6	6
(United Kingdom) GO Thomas	1	2	0
(United Kingdom) Henry Wilson-Fox	6	6	6
(United Kingdom) Charlie Finlason	6	5	2
(United Kingdom) George Caridia	8	7	6
(Australia) Norman Brookes	6	6	6
(United Kingdom) Ernest Salmon	0	2	3

Second round
(United Kingdom) C Cazalet	8	6	6
(United Kingdom) JB Ward	6	3	0
(United Kingdom) G Hillyard	6	9	6
(United Kingdom) G Simond	4	7	2
(United Kingdom) L Escombe	2	6	6	7
(United Kingdom) H Wilson-Fox	6	3	2	5
(United Kingdom) G Caridia	2	1	0
(Australia) N Brookes	6	6	6

Third round
(United Kingdom) C Cazalet	10	6	0^{r}
(United Kingdom) G Hillyard	8	8	0
(United Kingdom) L Escombe	3	4	4
(Australia) N Brookes	6	6	6

Fourth round
(United Kingdom) G Hillyard	3	1	3
(Australia) N Brookes	6	6	6

=== Bottom half ===
==== Section 5 ====
First round
(United Kingdom) Henry Fosbery	6	6	6
(United Kingdom) Charles Gouldesborough	2	2	4
(United Kingdom) Kenneth Powell
(United Kingdom) Reginald Doherty	w/o
(United Kingdom) Sydney Smith	6	6	8
(United States) Holcombe Ward	4	3	6

Second round
(United Kingdom) HJW Fosbery	6	6	9
(United Kingdom) K Powell	4	3	7
(United Kingdom) S Smith	6	6	6
(United Kingdom) Wilberforce Eaves	2	2	3
(United Kingdom) Penn Gaskell
(United Kingdom) John Dufall	w/o
(United Kingdom) Theodore Mavrogordato	5	6	6	6
(United Kingdom) Frank Pearce	7	2	3	2

Third round
(United Kingdom) HJW Fosbery	3	2	3
(United Kingdom) S Smith	6	6	6
(United Kingdom) P Gaskell	0	0	0
(United Kingdom) T Mavrogordato	6	6	6

Fourth round
(United Kingdom) S Smith	6	6	6
(United Kingdom) T Mavrogordato	2	0	2

==== Section 6 ====
First round

Second round
(New Zealand) Harry Parker	6	6	7
(United States) K Doust	3	2	5
(United Kingdom) Roderick McNair	6	6	6
(United Kingdom) Wallace Groser	2	2	2
(United Kingdom) George Orme
(United Kingdom) Harold Mahony	w/o
(United States) William Larned	6	6	6
(Denmark) Erik Larsen	1	0	1

Third round
(New Zealand) H Parker	6	6	6
(United Kingdom) R McNair	4	4	3
(United Kingdom) GL Orme	3	3	3
(United States) W Larned	6	6	6

Fourth round
(New Zealand) H Parker	4	6	4	7	3
(United States) W Larned	6	1	6	5	6

==== Section 7 ====
First round

Second round
(United Kingdom) ER Clarke
(United Kingdom) George Ball-Greene	w/o
(United Kingdom) Edward Yatman	4	6	6	7
(Germany) Ferdinand Uhl	6	2	4	5
(United Kingdom) Ernest Wills
(Sweden) Wollmar Boström	w/o
(United Kingdom) Arthur Cronin	6	6	6
(United Kingdom) Frederick Plaskitt	2	3	1

Third round
(United Kingdom) ER Clarke	6	6	6	4	1
(United Kingdom) E Yatman	2	3	8	6	6
(United Kingdom) E Wills	2	2	2
(United Kingdom) A Cronin	6	6	6

Fourth round
(United Kingdom) E Yatman	7	6	2	6
(United Kingdom) A Cronin	9	3	6	8

==== Section 8 ====
First round

Second round
(United Kingdom) Major Ritchie	6	6	6
(Australia) Barney Murphy	2	2	1
(United Kingdom) Cecil Hartley	6	6	8
(United Kingdom) WJ Lancaster	3	3	6
(United Kingdom) Henry Pollard	7	6	5	6
(South Africa) Harold Kitson	5	4	7	2
(United Kingdom) Alfred Beamish	6	6	6
(United Kingdom) David Hawes	3	3	2

Third round
(United Kingdom) M Ritchie	6	6	6
(United Kingdom) Cecil Hartley	3	3	2
(United Kingdom) Henry Pollard	0	3	5
(United Kingdom) A Beamish	6	6	7

Fourth round
(United Kingdom) M Ritchie	6	8	6
(United Kingdom) A Beamish	1	6	2

Preceded by 1904 U.S. National Championships – Men's singles	Grand Slam men's singles	Succeeded by 1905 U.S. National Championships – Men's singles
