= 1905 Australasian Championships – Singles =

Singles
- 1905 Australasian Championships

Final
- Champion: (Australia) Rodney Heath
- Runner-up: (Australia) Albert Curtis
- Score: 4–6, 6–3, 6–4, 6–4

Details
- Draw: 17
- Seeds: –

Events
Singles	Doubles
- Australasian Championships

Rodney Heath defeated Albert Curtis, 4–6, 6–3, 6–4, 6–4, in the final to win the men's singles tennis title at the 1905 Australasian Championships. The event was played on Grass courts in Melbourne, Australia at Warehouseman's Cricket Ground. It was the inaugural edition of the tournament and took place in November 1905.

== Draw ==
Key

- Q = Qualifier
- WC = Wild card
- LL = Lucky loser
- Alt = Alternate
- ITF = ITF entry
- PR = Protected ranking
- SR = Special ranking
- SE = Special exempt
- JE = Junior exempt
- JR = Junior Accelerator Programme entrant
- CO = College Accelerator Programme entrant
- NG = Next Gen Accelerator Program entrant
- w/o = Walkover
- r = Retired
- d = Defaulted

=== Finals ===
Quarterfinals
(Australia) Rodney Heath	6	6	6
(Australia) Herbert Turner	2	1	2
(United Kingdom) Randolph Lycett
(Australia) Gordon Wright	w/o
(Australia) Albert Curtis	3	7	6	6
(Australia) Eric Pockley	6	5	3	4
(Australia) Alfred Dunlop	6	6	6
(Australia) Reginald Fraser	4	3	2

Semifinals
(Australia) Rodney Heath	6	9	6	6
(United Kingdom) Randolph Lycett	3	11	3	1
(Australia) Albert Curtis	4	11	6	6
(Australia) Alfred Dunlop	6	9	3	4

Final
(Australia) Rodney Heath	4	6	6	6
(Australia) Albert Curtis	6	3	4	4

=== Top half ===
First round
(Australia) R Heath	6	6	6
(Australia) T Fitchett	4	1	0

Second round
(Australia) R Heath	4	6	6	6
(Australia) H Rice	6	2	4	0
(Australia) H Turner	6	6	6	3	6
(Australia) Cecil Heath	3	8	4	6	4
(United Kingdom) R Lycett	6	6	6
(Australia) H Hastings	2	2	2
(Australia) G Wright	4	6	7	6
(Australia) D Harbison	6	3	5	2

Quarterfinals
(Australia) R Heath	6	6	6
(Australia) H Turner	2	1	2
(United Kingdom) R Lycett
(Australia) G Wright	w/o

Semifinals
(Australia) R Heath	6	9	6	6
(United Kingdom) R Lycett	3	11	3	1

=== Bottom half ===
First round

Second round
(Australia) A Curtis	6	6	8
(Australia) Andrew Laurie	3	0	6
(Australia) E Pockley	6	4	6	4	6
(Australia) E Robertson	3	6	3	6	1
(Australia) A Dunlop	6	6	6
(Australia) George Howitt	4	3	2
(Australia) Percy Rowe	2	2	1
(Australia) R Fraser	6	6	6

Quarterfinals
(Australia) A Curtis	3	7	6	6
(Australia) E Pockley	6	5	3	4
(Australia) A Dunlop	6	6	6
(Australia) R Fraser	4	3	2

Semifinals
(Australia) A Curtis	4	11	6	6
(Australia) A Dunlop	6	9	3	4

Preceded by 1905 U.S. National Championships	Grand Slam men's singles	Succeeded by 1905 Wimbledon Championships
