= 1905 Grand National =

English steeplechase horse race

- Grand National
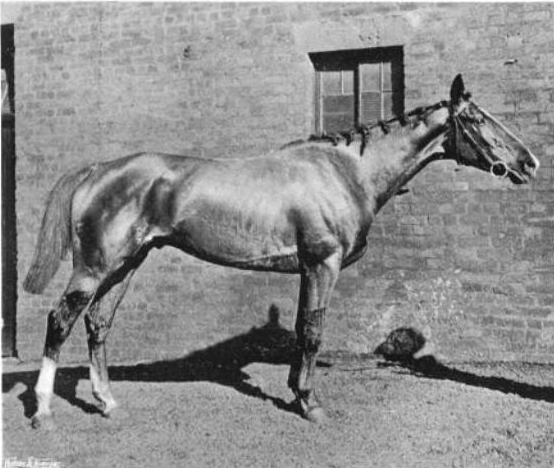
- Kirkland, the winning horse
- Location: Aintree
- Date: 31 March 1905
- Winning horse: (Republic of Ireland) Kirkland
- Starting price: 6/1
- Jockey: (England) Frank Mason
- Trainer: (Wales) E Thomas
- Owner: Frank Bibby
- Conditions: Good

The 1905 Grand National was the 67th renewal of the Grand National horse race that took place at Aintree Racecourse near Liverpool, England, on 31 March 1905.

It was won by Kirkland, a 6/1 shot that had been trained in Wales. He was the first Welsh-trained horse to have won the Grand National, and was ridden by Frank Mason.

== Finishing Order ==
Position	Name	Jockey	Age	Handicap (st-lb)	SP	Distance
01	Kirkland	Frank Mason	9	11-5	6/1	3 lengths
02	Napper Tandy	Percy Woodland	8	10-0	25/1	4 lengths
03	Buckaway II	Alfred Newey	7	9-11	100/1	Neck
04	Ranunculus	C Hollebone	7	9-12	7/1	
05	Hercules II	Joe Dillon	9	9-10	33/1	
06	Band of Hope	W Dowelly	9	9-11	100/1	
07	Cottenshope	Dennis Morris	9	9-11	66/1	

== Non-finishers ==
Fence	Name	Jockey	Age	Handicap (st-lb)	SP	Fate
30	Phil May	Richard Morgan	6	11-0	20/1	Fell
21	Moifaa	Bill Dollery	9	11-12	4/1	Fell
18	The Actuary	E Matthews	7	10-9	66/1	Pulled Up
24	Aunt May	E Sullivan	?	10-9	100/8	Fell
18	Matthew	Willie Morgan	9	10-9	66/1	Pulled Up
18	Deerslayer	Aubrey Hastings	9	10-8	100/6	Fell
03	Longthorpe	P Freemantle	8	10-7	33/1	Refused
30	Seahorse II	D O'Brien	7	10-7	20/1	Pulled Up
09	Detail	Patrick Cowley	9	10-8	100/7	Fell
24	Bucheron	V David	10	10-6	100/1	Fell
24	Timothy Titus	Ernest Morgan	7	10-5	100/6	Fell
03	Ascetic's Silver	Tom Dunn	8	10-8	20/1	Fell
02	Royal Drake	A Waddington	7	10-4	20/1	Fell
09	Biology	William Woodland	?	10-12	40/1	Fell
20	What Next	Captain Rasbotham	7	10-12	50/1	Fell
18	Miss Clifden II	F Barter	9	9-13	100/1	Fell
?	Saxilby	P Heany	8	9-12	66/1	?
03	Kiora	William Pawson	10	9-11	100/1	Fell
03	Nereus	George Goswell	7	9-10	66/1	Refused
03	Hallgate	Cole	6	9-7	100/1	Fell
