= 1903 Grand National =

English steeplechase horse race

- Grand National
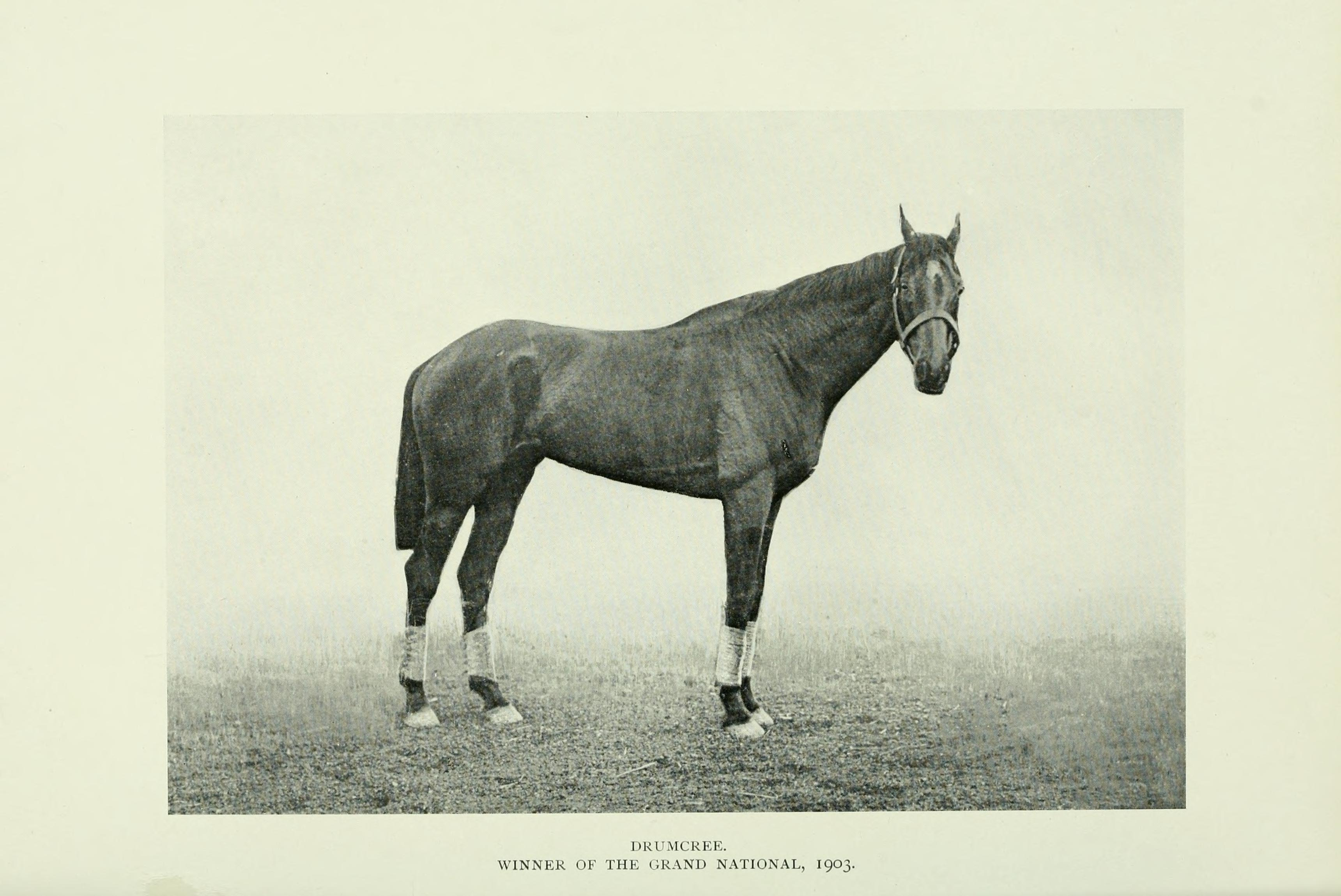
- Drumcree (from Heroes and heroines of the Grand National)
- Location: Aintree
- Date: 27 March 1903
- Winning horse: Drumcree
- Starting price: 13/2 F
- Jockey: Percy Woodland
- Trainer: Sir Charles Nugent
- Owner: John Morrison
- Conditions: Good (good to soft in places)

The 1903 Grand National was the 65th renewal of the Grand National horse race that took place at Aintree Racecourse near Liverpool, England, on 27 March 1903.

== Finishing Order ==
Position	Name	Jockey	Age	Handicap (st-lb)	SP	Distance
01	Drumcree	Percy Woodland	9	11-3	13/2	3 lengths
02	Detail	Arthur Nightingall	7	9-13	100/14	20 Lengths
03	Manifesto	George Williamson	15	12-3	25/1	
04	Kirkland	Frank Mason	7	10-8	100/8	

== Non-finishers ==
Fence	Name	Jockey	Age	Handicap (st-lb)	SP	Fate
30	Ambush II	Algy Anthony	9	12-7	100/6	Fell
?	Fanciful	Mr W P Cullen	8	11-7	100/6	?
30	Drumree	James Phillips	7	11-4	25/1	Fell
02	Inquisitor	R Matthews	8	10-13	100/6	Fell
02	Fairland	Willie Morgan	10	10-13	20/1	Fell
14	Marpessa	Mr Persee	6	10-11	25/1	Fell
03	Cushendon	F Cole	8	10-10	100/1	Fell
02	Kilmalloo	T Moran	6	10-9	20/1	Fell
29	Deerslayer	Ernest Piggott	7	10-11	25/1	Fell
?	Pride of Mabestown	Bill Dollery	7	10-8	10/1	?
22	Patlander	M Walsh	7	10-7	40/1	Fell
23-28	Matthew	Mr Joe Widger	7	10-7	10/1	Fell
01	Expert II	J Woodland	6	10-5	40/1	Fell
?	Aunt May	O Read	7	10-0	10/1	?
?	Benvenir	Mr Hayes	7	9-12	100/1	?
01	Orange Pat	Richard Morgan	7	9-10	40/1	Fell
?	Pawnbroker	J O'Brien	8	9-9	100/1	?
29	Saxilby	George Goswell	6	9-7	50/1	Fell
14	Gillie II	A Wilkins	11	9-7	100/1	Fell
