= Albert Cricket Ground =

Cricket ground in St Kilda, Victoria

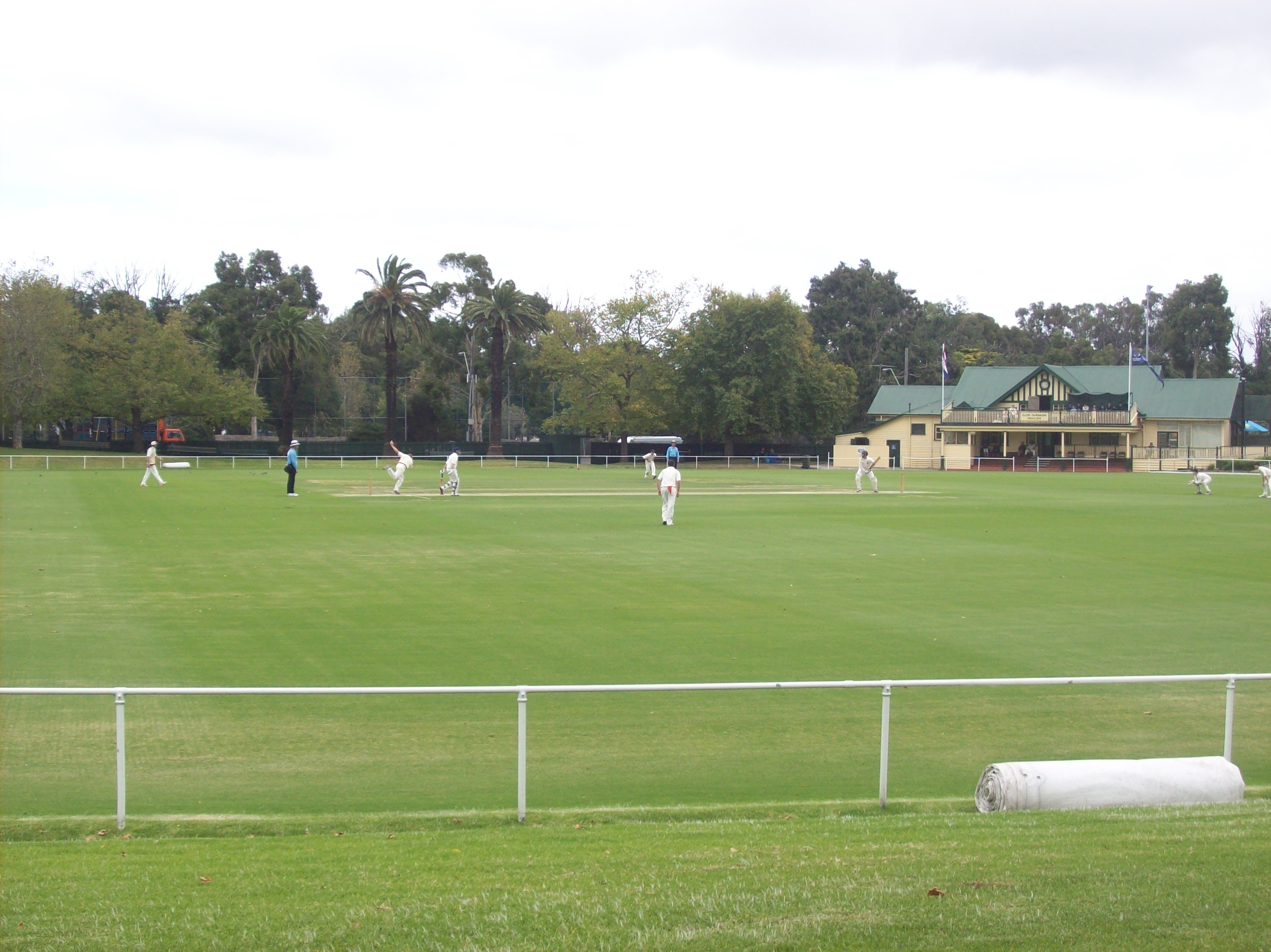
- Interactive map of Albert Cricket Ground
- Former names: Warehouseman's Cricket Ground
- Location: St Kilda, Victoria
- Coordinates: 37°50′43″S 144°58′39″E
- Operator: Melbourne Cricket Club
- Capacity: 2,000
- Surface: Grass
- Field size: 145m × 130m

Tenants
- Melbourne Cricket Club; Lawn Tennis Association of Victoria (until the 1920s); Melbourne Stars (WBBL)

Ground information

International information
- Only women's Test: 26 January 1979: Australia v New Zealand
- First women's ODI: 10 December 1988: Australia v New Zealand
- Last women's ODI: 25 February 2004: Australia v New Zealand
- As of 8 September 2020; Source: CricketArchive

Albert Cricket Ground, also known as the Albert Reserve and previously as the Warehouseman's Cricket Ground, is a cricket ground in St Kilda, Victoria. It is operated by the Melbourne Cricket Club (MCC), and used as its primary home ground in the Victorian Premier Cricket competition.

== Cricket ==
The Melbourne Cricket Club has held the lease for the venue, originally known as the Warehouseman's Ground, since 1890. It has been the primary home venue for its cricket team in the Victorian District/Premier Cricket competition since that time. The venue is one of the primary finals venue in the premier cricket competition, and hosted the first XI district/premier cricket final almost every year from 1953/54 until the early 21st century.

The venue has never hosted a first-class cricket match; in 2003, it was to have hosted its first List A match, a tour match between Australia A and South Africa A, but the match was abandoned without a ball being bowled due to rain.

Top level women's cricket has been played on the ground. One women's Test match was played at the ground between Australia and New Zealand in January 1979, and the Rose Bowl series of Women's One Day International matches in 1988–89, 1990–91, and on three occasions in 1999–2000.

The venue has one pavilion, the Clive Fairbairn Pavilion, named after MCC player, administrator and life member Clive Fairbairn.

== Tennis ==
In 1905, the tennis courts at the Warehouseman's Cricket Ground were the venue of the first Australasian Tennis Championship, the tournament which later became the Australian Open. Lawn tennis at that time was administered in Victoria by the Melbourne Cricket Club. Rodney Heath defeated fellow Australian Arthur Curtis in four sets to claim the inaugural title. The venue hosted the Australasian Championships under the auspices of the MCC, and later the Lawn Tennis Association of Victoria, a total of four times: in 1905, 1911, 1914 and 1924, as well as the 1908 and 1912 Davis Cup finals, after which Kooyong became the primary venue for lawn tennis in Melbourne.

A set of public tennis courts remains available at Albert Reserve to the north of the cricket ground.

== Other sports ==
The Melbourne Cricket Club lacrosse team has its training and playing base at the Albert Cricket Ground; the club's baseball team also used the venue until 1976.

Football has been played on the ground in the past. The original Prahran Football Club, which played senior football in the Victorian Football Association in 1886 and 1887 before amalgamating with St Kilda, played its home matches at the ground in 1886; and the Melbourne Football Club (which was a part of the MCC) played some games there after 1890. The Leopold Football Club also played home games at the ground while competing in the Metropolitan Junior Football Association (MJFA). The ground is not used for football today.

In the early years of cycling in Victoria the ground was used to host races. On 24 May 1880 it was the scene of the first 25 Miles race of the Melbourne Bicycle Club on the occasion of Queen Victoria's birthday celebrations.
