= 1904 U.S. National Championships (tennis) =

- Date: August 21–31, 1904 (M); June 21–25, 1904 (W)
- Edition: 24th
- Category: Grand Slam
- Surface: Grass
- Location: Newport, R.I., United States (M); Philadelphia, PA, United States (W)

Champions

Men's singles
- (United States) Holcombe Ward

Women's singles
- (United States) May Sutton

Men's doubles
- (United States) Holcombe Ward / (United States) Beals Wright

Women's doubles
- (United States) May Sutton / (United States) Miriam Hall

Mixed doubles
- (United States) Elisabeth Moore / (United States) Wylie Grant
- U.S. National Championships

The 1904 U.S. National Championships (now known as the US Open) was a tennis tournament that took place in June and August of 1904. The women's tournament was held from June 21 to June 25 on the outdoor grass courts at the Philadelphia Cricket Club in Philadelphia, Pennsylvania. The men's tournament was held from August 21 to August 31 on the outdoor grass courts at the Newport Casino in Newport, Rhode Island. It was the 24th U.S. National Championships and the second Grand Slam tournament of the year.

== Finals ==
=== Men's singles ===
(United States) Holcombe Ward (USA) defeated (United States) William Clothier (USA) 10–8, 6–4, 9–7

=== Women's singles ===
(United States) May Sutton (USA) defeated (United States) Elisabeth Moore (USA) 6–1, 6–2

=== Men's doubles ===
(United States) Holcombe Ward (USA) / (United States) Beals Wright (USA) defeated (United States) Kreigh Collins (USA) / (United States) Raymond Little (USA) 1–6, 6–2, 3–6, 6–4, 6–1

=== Women's doubles ===
(United States) May Sutton (USA) / (United States) Miriam Hall (USA) defeated (United States) Elisabeth Moore (USA) / (United States) Carrie Neely (USA) 3–6, 6–3, 6–3

=== Mixed doubles ===
(United States) Elisabeth Moore (USA) / (United States) Wylie Grant (USA) defeated (United States) May Sutton (USA) / (United States) Trevanion Dallas (USA) 6–2, 6–1

Preceded by 1904 Wimbledon Championships	Grand Slams	Succeeded by 1905 Wimbledon Championships
