= 1904 Wimbledon Championships – Men's singles =

Men's singles
- 1904 Wimbledon Championships

Final
- Champion: (United Kingdom) Laurence Doherty
- Runner-up: (United Kingdom) Frank Riseley
- Score: 6–1, 7–5, 8–6

Details
- Draw: 62
- Seeds: –

Events
Singles	men	women
Doubles	men	women
- Wimbledon Championships

Frank Riseley defeated Major Ritchie 6–0, 6–1, 6–2 in the All Comers' Final, but the reigning champion Laurence Doherty defeated Riseley 6–1, 7–5, 8–6 in the challenge round to win the gentlemen's singles tennis title at the 1904 Wimbledon Championships.

== Draw ==
Key

- Q = Qualifier
- WC = Wild card
- LL = Lucky loser
- Alt = Alternate
- ITF = ITF entry
- PR = Protected ranking
- SR = Special ranking
- SE = Special exempt
- JE = Junior exempt
- JR = Junior Accelerator Programme entrant
- CO = College Accelerator Programme entrant
- NG = Next Gen Accelerator Program entrant
- w/o = Walkover
- r = Retired
- d = Defaulted

=== Challenge round ===
Challenge Round
(United Kingdom) Frank Riseley	1	5	6
(United Kingdom) Laurence Doherty	6	7	8

=== All comers' finals ===
Quarterfinals
(United Kingdom) Arthur Gore	6	1	6	4	3
(United Kingdom) Frank Riseley	3	6	3	6	6
(United Kingdom) George Caridia	5	6	3
(United Kingdom) Sydney Smith	7	8	6
(Belgium) William le Maire de Warzée	1	6	4
(United Kingdom) Major Ritchie	6	8	6
(United Kingdom) Roderick McNair	0	4	4
(Belgium) Paul de Borman	6	6	6

Semifinals
(United Kingdom) Frank Riseley	7	5	8	5	0
(United Kingdom) Sydney Smith	5	7	6	7	0^{r}
(United Kingdom) Major Ritchie	6	6	6
(Belgium) Paul de Borman	3	1	1

Final
(United Kingdom) Frank Riseley	6	6	6
(United Kingdom) Major Ritchie	0	1	2

=== Top half ===
==== Section 1 ====
First round
(United Kingdom) Norman Marrett	6	6	6
(United Kingdom) Sydney Watts	4	2	1
(United Kingdom) Stanley Franklin	6	2	6	0
(United Kingdom) JB Dufall	3	6	0	0^{r}
(United Kingdom) David Hawes
(United Kingdom) Clement Cazalet	w/o
(United Kingdom) George Greville	6	6	6
(United Kingdom) GL Orme	1	0	0
(United Kingdom) Frank Riseley	6	6	6
(United Kingdom) HR Fussell	3	2	3
(New Zealand) Anthony Wilding	2	6	6	6
(United Kingdom) Albert Prebble	6	2	4	2
(United Kingdom) Harold Mahony	6	6	6
(United Kingdom) Fredric Warburg	4	2	3

Second round
(United Kingdom) A Gore	6	6	6
(United Kingdom) N Marrett	3	2	3
(United Kingdom) S Franklin	4	7	2
(United Kingdom) D Hawes	6	9	6
(United Kingdom) G Greville	6	0	6	2	3
(United Kingdom) F Riseley	2	6	4	6	6
(New Zealand) A Wilding	6	4	9	1
(United Kingdom) H Mahony	4	6	11	6

Third round
(United Kingdom) A Gore	6	6	6
(United Kingdom) D Hawes	2	4	0
(United Kingdom) F Riseley	6	6	6
(United Kingdom) H Mahony	1	4	2

Quarterfinals
(United Kingdom) A Gore	3	6	3	6	6
(United Kingdom) F Riseley	6	1	6	4	3

==== Section 2 ====
First round
(United Kingdom) Fritz Goldberg
(United Kingdom) Reginald Doherty	w/o
(United Kingdom) Brame Hillyard	6	6	6
(United Kingdom) AW Perceval	0	0	2
(United Kingdom) Archibald McNair	6	6	6
(United Kingdom) ER Clarke	2	3	4
(United Kingdom) George Caridia	1	12	6	6
(United Kingdom) Walter Crawley	6	10	0	2
(United Kingdom) EW Timmis
(United Kingdom) Frank Pearce	w/o
(United Kingdom) Wallace McGregor
(Austria) Rolf Kinzl	w/o
(United Kingdom) Henry Pollard	6	6	3
(United Kingdom) Alfred Herschell	1	2	0^{r}
(United Kingdom) Sydney Smith	6	6	6
(United Kingdom) Claude Russell-Brown	3	3	1

Second round
(United Kingdom) F Goldberg
(United Kingdom) B Hillyard	w/o
(United Kingdom) A McNair	5	2	4
(United Kingdom) G Caridia	7	6	6
(United Kingdom) EW Timmis	6	4	3	6	3
(United Kingdom) W McGregor	4	6	6	4	6
(United Kingdom) H Pollard	2	1	1
(United Kingdom) S Smith	6	6	6

Third round
(United Kingdom) F Goldberg	5	0	2
(United Kingdom) G Caridia	7	6	6
(United Kingdom) W McGregor	0	1	0
(United Kingdom) S Smith	6	6	6

Quarterfinals
(United Kingdom) G Caridia	7	8	6
(United Kingdom) S Smith	5	6	3

=== Bottom half ===
==== Section 3 ====
First round
(United Kingdom) EJ Sampson	9	0	6	6
(United Kingdom) E Yatman	7	6	4	1
(United Kingdom) Sydney Adams	6	6	6
(United Kingdom) Arthur Norris	4	3	2
(United Kingdom) Alfred Beamish	6	4	6	6
(United Kingdom) FN Warden	4	6	2	3
(Belgium) William le Maire de Warzée	6	6	6
(United Kingdom) Charles Simond	1	1	3
(United Kingdom) Wilberforce Eaves	6	6	6
(United Kingdom) HI Bury	2	2	4
(United Kingdom) John Flavelle	6	6	7
(United Kingdom) WH Jackson	1	1	5
(United Kingdom) Major Ritchie	6	6	6
(United Kingdom) Frederick Plaskitt	2	2	4
(United Kingdom) Arthur Cronin	6	6	6
(United Kingdom) SR Arthur	4	1	2

Second round
(United Kingdom) EJ Sampson	4	4	4
(United Kingdom) S Adams	6	6	6
(United Kingdom) A Beamish	0	6	0	3
(Belgium) W le Maire de Warzée	6	2	6	6
(United Kingdom) W Eaves	6	2	6	7
(United Kingdom) J Flavelle	1	6	4	5
(United Kingdom) M Ritchie	6	6	6
(United Kingdom) A Cronin	1	4	3

Third round
(United Kingdom) S Adams	1	3	2
(Belgium) W le Maire de Warzée	6	6	6
(United Kingdom) W Eaves	6	1	6	2	5
(United Kingdom) M Ritchie	3	6	2	6	7

Quarterfinals
(Belgium) W le Maire de Warzée	1	6	4
(United Kingdom) M Ritchie	6	8	6

==== Section 4 ====
First round
(United Kingdom) Roderick McNair	7	3	6	6	6
(United Kingdom) S Baddeley	5	6	8	3	4
(United Kingdom) Charlie Finlason	4	6	6	6	6
(United Kingdom) Frank Pearson	6	2	4	8	2
(United Kingdom) George Simond	7	6	6
(United Kingdom) Evan Gwynne-Evans	5	4	3
(United Kingdom) Robert Hough
(Austria) Kurt von Wessely	w/o
(United Kingdom) Ernest Wills	6	7	8	6
(United Kingdom) Henry Wilson-Fox	1	5	10	0
(United Kingdom) Frederick Payn	6	6	6
(United Kingdom) Theodore Mavrogordato	2	2	2
(Belgium) Paul de Borman	7	6	6
(United Kingdom) Lionel Escombe	5	2	3

Second round
(United Kingdom) R McNair	12	6	10	9
(United Kingdom) C Finlason	10	4	12	7
(United Kingdom) G Simond	6	9	6
(United Kingdom) R Hough	2	7	2
(United Kingdom) E Wills	3	3	3
(United Kingdom) F Payn	6	6	6
(Belgium) P de Borman	6	6	3	6
(United Kingdom) George Ball-Greene	4	2	6	4

Third round
(United Kingdom) R McNair	9	1
(United Kingdom) G Simond	7	0^{r}
(United Kingdom) F Payn	6	0	0	2
(Belgium) P de Borman	1	6	6	6

Quarterfinals
(United Kingdom) R McNair	0	4	4
(Belgium) P de Borman	6	6	6

Preceded by 1903 U.S. National Championships – Men's singles	Grand Slam men's singles	Succeeded by 1904 U.S. National Championships – Men's singles
