= Kirkland (horse) =

Irish-bred Thoroughbred

Kirkland - 1905
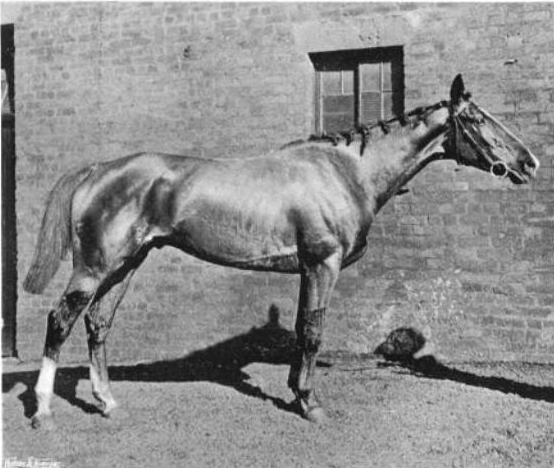
- Kirkland
- Sire: Kirkham
- Dam: Perizonius Mare
- Damsire: Perizonius
- Sex: Gelding
- Foaled: 1896
- Country: Ireland
- Colour: Chestnut
- Owner: Frank Bibby
- Trainer: E Thomas

Major wins
- Grand National (1905)

Kirkland (foaled 1896) was an Irish-bred Thoroughbred racehorse who competed in National Hunt racing.

Kirkland is most famous for winning the 1905 Grand National while being ridden by Frank Mason. He was the first, and so far only, Welsh-trained horse to have won the Grand National.

== Grand National record ==
Grand National	Position	Jockey	Age	Weight	SP	Distance
1903	4th	Frank Mason	7	10-8	100/8	
1904	2nd	Frank Mason	8	10-10	100/7	Neck
1905	1st	Frank Mason	9	11-5	6/1	Won by 3 lengths

== Pedigree ==
Pedigree of Kirkland (IRE), chestnut gelding, 1896
Sire Kirkham (AUS) 1887	Chester (AUS); 1874	Yattendon (AUS)	Sir Hercules (AUS)
Sire Kirkham (AUS) 1887	Chester (AUS); 1874	Yattendon (AUS)	Cassandra (AUS)
Sire Kirkham (AUS) 1887	Chester (AUS); 1874	Lady Chester (GB)	Stockwell* (GB)
Sire Kirkham (AUS) 1887	Chester (AUS); 1874	Lady Chester (GB)	Austrey (GB)
Sire Kirkham (AUS) 1887	La Princesse (GB); 1880	Cathedral (GB)	Newminster* (GB)
Sire Kirkham (AUS) 1887	La Princesse (GB); 1880	Cathedral (GB)	Stolen Moments (GB)
Sire Kirkham (AUS) 1887	La Princesse (GB); 1880	The Princess of Wales (GB)	Stockwell* (GB)
Sire Kirkham (AUS) 1887	La Princesse (GB); 1880	The Princess of Wales (GB)	The Bloomer (GB)
Dam Perizonius Mare (IRE) 1893	Perizonius (GB); 1892	Pero Gomez (GB)	Beadsman (GB)
Dam Perizonius Mare (IRE) 1893	Perizonius (GB); 1892	Pero Gomez (GB)	Salamanca (GB)
Dam Perizonius Mare (IRE) 1893	Perizonius (GB); 1892	Mrs Wolf (GB)	Newminster* (GB)
Dam Perizonius Mare (IRE) 1893	Perizonius (GB); 1892	Mrs Wolf (GB)	Lady Tatton (GB)
Dam Perizonius Mare (IRE) 1893	Sensation Mare (IRE)	Sensation (GB)	Best Returns (GB)
Dam Perizonius Mare (IRE) 1893	Sensation Mare (IRE)	Sensation (GB)	A Norfolk Trotting Mare
Dam Perizonius Mare (IRE) 1893	Sensation Mare (IRE)	East Lancashire Mare (IRE)	East Lancashire (GB)
Dam Perizonius Mare (IRE) 1893	Sensation Mare (IRE)	East Lancashire Mare (IRE)	Dough Mare (GB)

* Kirkland is inbred 4S x 4D to the stallion Stockwell, meaning that he appears fourth generation on the sire side of his pedigree, and fourth generation on the dam side of his pedigree.

* Kirkland is inbred 4S x 4D to the stallion Newminster, meaning that he appears fourth generation on the sire side of his pedigree, and fourth generation on the dam side of his pedigree.
