= 1903 Wimbledon Championships =

- Date: 22 June – 1 July
- Edition: 27th
- Category: Grand Slam
- Surface: Grass
- Location: Worple Road; SW19, Wimbledon, London, United Kingdom
- Venue: All England Lawn Tennis and Croquet Club

Champions

Men's singles
- (United Kingdom of Great Britain and Ireland) Laurence Doherty

Women's singles
- (United Kingdom of Great Britain and Ireland) Dorothea Douglass

Men's doubles
- (United Kingdom of Great Britain and Ireland) Laurence Doherty / (United Kingdom of Great Britain and Ireland) Reginald Doherty
- Wimbledon Championships

The 1903 Wimbledon Championships took place on the outdoor grass courts at the All England Lawn Tennis and Croquet Club in Wimbledon, London, United Kingdom. The tournament ran from 22 June until 1 July. It was the 27th staging of the Wimbledon Championships, and the first Grand Slam tennis event of 1903.

== Champions ==
=== Men's singles ===
(United Kingdom of Great Britain and Ireland) Laurence Doherty defeated (United Kingdom of Great Britain and Ireland) Frank Riseley, 7–5, 6–3, 6–0

=== Women's singles ===
(United Kingdom of Great Britain and Ireland) Dorothea Douglass defeated (United Kingdom of Great Britain and Ireland) Ethel Thomson, 4–6, 6–4, 6–2

=== Men's doubles ===
(United Kingdom of Great Britain and Ireland) Laurence Doherty / (United Kingdom of Great Britain and Ireland) Reginald Doherty defeated (United Kingdom of Great Britain and Ireland) Frank Riseley / (United Kingdom of Great Britain and Ireland) Sydney Smith, 6–4, 6–4, 6–4

Preceded by 1902 U.S. National Championships	Grand Slams	Succeeded by 1903 U.S. National Championships
