= 1905 Wimbledon Championships =

- Date: 26 June – 8 July
- Edition: 29th
- Category: Grand Slam
- Surface: Grass
- Location: Worple Road; SW19, Wimbledon, London, United Kingdom
- Venue: All England Lawn Tennis and Croquet Club

Champions

Men's singles
- (United Kingdom of Great Britain and Ireland) Laurence Doherty

Women's singles
- (United States) May Sutton

Men's doubles
- (United Kingdom of Great Britain and Ireland) Laurence Doherty / (United Kingdom of Great Britain and Ireland) Reginald Doherty
- Wimbledon Championships

The 1905 Wimbledon Championships was a tennis tournament that took place on the outdoor grass courts at the All England Lawn Tennis and Croquet Club in Wimbledon, London, United Kingdom. The tournament ran from 26 June until 8 July. It was the 29th staging of the Wimbledon Championships, and the first Grand Slam tennis event of 1905. May Sutton was the first overseas winner of a Wimbledon championship. There were 71 entries into the men's singles draw setting a new participation record for the event.

== Champions ==
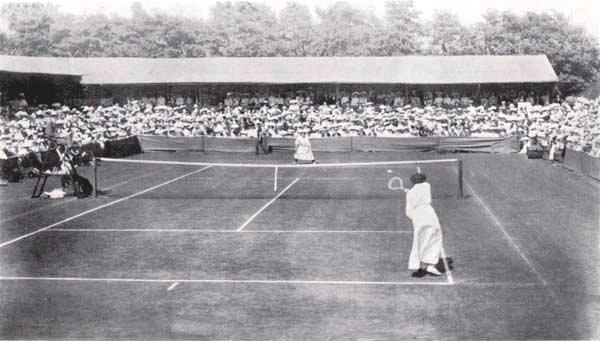
Wimbledon 1905, Ladies final between May Sutton and Dorothea Douglass.

=== Men's singles ===
(United Kingdom of Great Britain and Ireland) Laurence Doherty defeated (Australia) Norman Brookes, 8–6, 6–2, 6–4

=== Women's singles ===
(United States) May Sutton defeated (United Kingdom of Great Britain and Ireland) Dorothea Douglass, 6–3, 6–4

=== Men's doubles ===
(United Kingdom of Great Britain and Ireland) Laurence Doherty / (United Kingdom of Great Britain and Ireland) Reginald Doherty defeated (United Kingdom of Great Britain and Ireland) Frank Riseley / (United Kingdom of Great Britain and Ireland) Sydney Smith, 6–2, 6–4, 6–8, 6–3

Preceded by 1904 U.S. National Championships	Grand Slams	Succeeded by 1905 U.S. National Championships
