= 1904 Currie Cup =

Domestic rugby union competition

- Countries: South Africa
- Champions: Western Province (6th title)

The 1904 Currie Cup was the seventh edition of the Currie Cup, the premier domestic rugby union competition in South Africa.

The tournament was won by Western Province for the sixth time, who won all six of their matches in the competition.

== See also ==
- Currie Cup
