= 1905 U.S. National Championships – Women's singles =

Women's singles
- 1905 U.S. National Championships

Final
- Champion: (United States) Elisabeth Moore
- Runner-up: (United States) Helen Homans
- Score: 6–4, 5–7, 6–1

Details
- Draw: 18
- Seeds: –

Events
Singles	men	women
Doubles	men	women
← 1904 ·	U.S. National Championships	· 1906 →

Elisabeth Moore won the singles tennis title of the 1905 U.S. Women's National Singles Championship by defeating Helen Homans 6–4, 5–7, 6–1 in the final of the All Comers' tournament. May Sutton was the reigning champion but did not defend her title in the Challenge Round. The event was played on outdoor grass courts and held at the Philadelphia Cricket Club in Wissahickon Heights, Chestnut Hill, Philadelphia from June 20 through June 24, 1905.

== Draw ==
=== All Comers' finals ===
Quarterfinals
(United States) Elisabeth Moore	4	6	6
(United States) Carrie Neely	6	1	2
(United States) Margaret LeRoy	6	6	6
(United States) Clara Chase	3	8	1
(United States) Eugenia Wainwright
(United States) Helen Homans	w/o
(United States) Evelyn Howell	2	5
(United States) Mary Coates	6	7

Semifinals
(United States) Elisabeth Moore	6	6
(United States) Margaret LeRoy	1	3
(United States) Helen Homans	6	6
(United States) Mary Coates	1	0

Finals
(United States) Elisabeth Moore	6	5	6
(United States) Helen Homans	4	7	1

Preceded by 1905 Wimbledon Championships – Women's singles	Grand Slam women's singles	Succeeded by 1906 Wimbledon Championships – Women's singles
