= 1904 Wimbledon Championships – Women's singles =

Women's singles
- 1904 Wimbledon Championships

Final
- Champion: (United Kingdom) Dorothea Douglass
- Runner-up: (United Kingdom) Charlotte Sterry
- Score: 6–0, 6–3

Details
- Draw: 41
- Seeds: –

Events
Singles	men	women
Doubles	men	women
← 1903 ·	Wimbledon Championships	· 1905 →

Charlotte Sterry defeated Agnes Morton 6–3, 6–3 in the All Comers' Final, but the reigning champion Dorothea Douglass defeated Sterry 6–0, 6–3 in the challenge round to win the ladies' singles tennis title at the 1904 Wimbledon Championships.

== Draw ==
=== Key ===
- Q = Qualifier
- WC = Wild card
- LL = Lucky loser
- Alt = Alternate
- ITF = ITF entry
- PR = Protected ranking
- SR = Special ranking
- SE = Special exempt
- JE = Junior exempt
- JR = Junior Accelerator Programme entrant
- CO = College Accelerator Programme entrant
- NG = Next Gen Accelerator Program entrant
- w/o = Walkover
- r = Retired
- d = Defaulted

=== Challenge round ===
Challenge Round
(United Kingdom) Charlotte Sterry	0	3
(United Kingdom) Dorothea Douglass	6	6

=== All comers' finals ===
Quarterfinals
(United Kingdom) Charlotte Sterry	8	9
(United Kingdom) Edith Greville	6	7
(United Kingdom) Alice Greene	6	6
(United Kingdom) Ruth Winch	4	4
(United Kingdom) Winifred Longhurst	1	4
(United Kingdom) Agnes Morton	6	6
(United Kingdom) Constance Wilson	6	6
(United Kingdom) EL Bosworth	3	4

Semifinals
(United Kingdom) Charlotte Sterry	6	6
(United Kingdom) Alice Greene	2	1
(United Kingdom) Agnes Morton	3	6	8
(United Kingdom) Constance Wilson	6	4	6

Final
(United Kingdom) Charlotte Sterry	6	6
(United Kingdom) Agnes Morton	3	3

=== Top half ===
==== Section 1 ====
First round

Second round
(United Kingdom) Charlotte Sterry
(United Kingdom) LH Ransome	w/o
(United Kingdom) Beryl Tulloch	2	6	6
(United Kingdom) Mrs Macaulay	6	0	0
(United Kingdom) Edith Greville
(United Kingdom) E.J. Bromfield	w/o
(France) Nadine Masson	6	6
(United Kingdom) S Benton	2	3

Third round
(United Kingdom) C Sterry	6	6
(United Kingdom) B Tulloch	2	2
(United Kingdom) E Greville	6	6
(France) N Masson	0	1

Quarterfinals
(United Kingdom) C Sterry	8	9
(United Kingdom) E Greville	6	7

==== Section 2 ====
First round
(United Kingdom) Hilda Lane	6	6
(United Kingdom) CB Bell	1	0
(United Kingdom) Edith Johnson	6	5	7
(United Kingdom) M Taplin	2	7	5
(United Kingdom) Ruth Winch	4	6	7
(United Kingdom) Ellen Mary Stawell-Brown	6	3	5
(United Kingdom) Mrs M Chatterton
(United Kingdom) CHE Meyer	w/o
(United Kingdom) Mabel Squire	6	6
(United States) Maud Banks	0	2

Second round
(United Kingdom) Violet Pinckney	6	6
(France) Marie-Louise de Pfeffel	0	3
(United Kingdom) Alice Greene	4	7	6
(United Kingdom) H Lane	6	5	1
(United Kingdom) E Johnson	1	0
(United Kingdom) R Winch	6	6
(United Kingdom) Mrs M Chatterton	w/o
(United Kingdom) M Squire

Third round
(United Kingdom) V Pinckney	2	6	3
(United Kingdom) A Greene	6	3	6
(United Kingdom) R Winch	6	6
(United Kingdom) M Squire	3	3

Quarterfinals
(United Kingdom) A Greene	6	6
(United Kingdom) R Winch	4	4

=== Bottom half ===
==== Section 3 ====
First round
(United Kingdom) Dora Boothby	6	6
(United Kingdom) ME Brown	3	2
(United Kingdom) Winifred Longhurst	6	6
(United Kingdom) L Flemmich	1	0
(United Kingdom) Aurea Farrington	6	6
(United Kingdom) Mrs Albury	2	3
(United Kingdom) Blanche Hillyard	6	6
(United Kingdom) K Kentish	0	2

Second round
(United Kingdom) D Boothby	2	6
(United Kingdom) W Longhurst	6	8
(United Kingdom) A Farrington	0	1
(United Kingdom) B Hillyard	6	6
(United Kingdom) Ethel Thomson	6	6
(United Kingdom) L Ripley	0	1
(United Kingdom) Agnes Morton	6	6
(United Kingdom) Henrietta Horncastle	1	0

Third round
(United Kingdom) W Longhurst	6	6
(United Kingdom) B Hillyard	0	0
(United Kingdom) E Thomson	6	6	6
(United Kingdom) A Morton	8	2	8

Quarterfinals
(United Kingdom) W Longhurst	1	4
(United Kingdom) A Morton	6	6

==== Section 4 ====
First round

Second round
(United Kingdom) Constance Wilson	8	1	0
(France) Margherita de Robiglio	6	6	0^{r}
(United Kingdom) A Mooijaart
(United Kingdom) Mrs LR Hausberg	w/o
(United Kingdom) EL Bosworth
(United Kingdom) GD Driver	w/o
(United Kingdom) EE Sargeant	0	7	6
(United Kingdom) AG Ransome	6	5	4

Third round
(United Kingdom) C Wilson	6	6
(United Kingdom) A Mooijaart	4	0
(United Kingdom) EL Bosworth	7	6
(United Kingdom) EE Sargeant	5	2

Quarterfinals
(United Kingdom) C Wilson	6	6
(United Kingdom) EL Bosworth	3	4

Preceded by 1903 U.S. National Championships – Women's singles	Grand Slam women's singles	Succeeded by 1904 U.S. National Championships – Women's singles
