= 1904 U.S. National Championships – Women's singles =

Tennis tournament

Women's singles
- 1904 U.S. National Championships

Final
- Champion: (United States) May Sutton
- Runner-up: (United States) Elisabeth Moore
- Score: 6–1, 6–2

Details
- Draw: 18
- Seeds: –

Events
Singles	men	women
Doubles	men	women
← 1903 ·	U.S. National Championships	· 1905 →

May Sutton won the singles tennis title of the 1904 U.S. Women's National Singles Championship by defeating reigning champion Elisabeth Moore 6–1, 6–2 in the challenge round. Sutton had won the right to challenge Moore by defeating Helen Homans 6–1, 6–1 in the final of the All Comers' competition. The event was played on outdoor grass courts and held at the Philadelphia Cricket Club in Wissahickon Heights, Chestnut Hill, Philadelphia from June 21 through June 25, 1904.

== Draw ==
=== Challenge round ===
Challenge Round
(United States) Elisabeth Moore	1	2
(United States) May Sutton	6	6

=== All Comers' finals ===
Quarterfinals
(United States) Helen Homans	7	11
(United States) Carrie Neely	5	9
(United States) Miriam Hall	6	6
(United States) Marie Wimer	3	2
(United States) Clara Chase	3	2
(United States) Sarah Coffin	6	6
(United States) Frances Stotesbury	1	0
(United States) May Sutton	6	6

Semifinals
(United States) Helen Homans	6	6
(United States) Miriam Hall	4	3
(United States) Sarah Coffin	1	0
(United States) May Sutton	6	6

Finals
(United States) Helen Homans	1	1
(United States) May Sutton	6	6

Preceded by 1904 Wimbledon Championships – Women's singles	Grand Slam women's singles	Succeeded by 1905 Wimbledon Championships – Women's singles
