= 1905 Australasian Championships =

- Date: 21–25 November 1905
- Edition: 1st
- Surface: Grass
- Location: Melbourne, Victoria, Australia
- Venue: Warehouseman's Cricket Ground

Champions

Singles
- (Australia) Rodney Heath

Doubles
- (United Kingdom of Great Britain and Ireland) Randolph Lycett / (Australia) Tom Tachell
- Australasian Championships

The 1905 Australasian Championships was a tennis tournament played on grass courts in Melbourne, Australia, at the Warehouseman's Cricket Ground. The tournament took place from 21 November to 25 November 1905. It was the inaugural edition of the Australasian Championships and consisted of a men's singles and men's doubles competition. The men's singles event had a field of 17 players and was won by Australian Rodney Heath.

== Finals ==
=== Singles ===
(Australia) Rodney Heath defeated (Australia) Albert Curtis, 4–6, 6–3, 6–4, 6–4

=== Doubles ===
(United Kingdom of Great Britain and Ireland) Randolph Lycett / (Australia) Tom Tachell defeated (Australia) E.T. Barnard / (Australia) Basil Spence, 11–9, 8–6, 1–6, 4–6, 6–1

Preceded by 1905 U.S. National Championships	Grand Slams	Succeeded by 1906 Wimbledon Championships
