= Tom Tachell =

Australian tennis player

Thomas Tachell
- Country (sports): Australia
- Born: 1870s Australia
- Died: 20th century

Singles
- Career record: 0
- Career titles: 0

Doubles
- Career record: 1
- Career titles: 1

Tom Tachell was an Australian professional tennis player who the 1905 Australian Championships (with Randolph Lycett) in men's doubles.

== Grand slam finals ==
=== Doubles (1 title) ===
Result	Year	Championship	Surface	Partner	Opponents	Score
Winn	1905	Australian Championships	Grass	(Australia) Randolph Lycett	(Australia) Edgar T. Barnard (Australia) Basil Spence	11–9, 8–6, 1–6, 4–6, 6–1
