= 1904 International Lawn Tennis Challenge =

1904 edition of the International Lawn Tennis Challenge

Details
- Duration: 27 June – 5 July 1904
- Edition: 4th
- Teams: 3

Champion
- Winning nation: British Isles

The 1904 International Lawn Tennis Challenge was the fourth edition of what is now known as the Davis Cup, and the first edition to be played outside American soil. As defending champions, the British Isles team played host to the competition, which featured teams from Belgium and France for the first time. Belgium and France would play for the right to challenge the British Isles for the cup. The ties were played at Worple Road (the former site of the All England Club) in Wimbledon, London, United Kingdom from 27 June to 5 July. Despite Malcolm Whitman giving his word that an American team would enter, the Americans failed to make a challenge before the 7 March deadline.

== Final ==
Belgium vs. France

Belgium
3
Worple Road, Wimbledon, London, England
27–29 June 1904
Grass

France
2

			1	2	3	4	5
1	(Belgium) (France)	Paul de Borman; Max Decugis	4; 6	3; 5				retired
2	(Belgium) (France)	William le Maire de Warzée; Paul Aymé	6; 1	6; 0	6; 1
3	(Belgium) (France)	Paul de Borman / William le Maire de Warzée; Paul Aymé / Max Decugis	7; 5	4; 6	6; 0	4; 6	2; 6
4	(Belgium) (France)	Paul de Borman; Paul Aymé	6; 1	6; 3	2; 6	1; 6	6; 3
5	(Belgium) (France)	William le Maire de Warzée; Max Decugis	5; 7	8; 6	0; 6	6; 4	6; 2

== Challenge Round ==
British Isles vs. Belgium

British Isles
5
Worple Road, Wimbledon, London, England
2–5 July 1904
Grass

Belgium
0

			1	2	3	4	5
1	(United Kingdom) (Belgium)	Frank Riseley; William le Maire de Warzée	6; 1	6; 1	6; 2
2	(United Kingdom) (Belgium)	Laurence Doherty; Paul de Borman	6; 4	6; 1	6; 1
3	(United Kingdom) (Belgium)	Laurence Doherty / Reggie Doherty; Paul de Borman / William le Maire de Warzée	6; 0	6; 1	6; 3
4	(United Kingdom) (Belgium)	Laurence Doherty; William le Maire de Warzée						w/o
5	(United Kingdom) (Belgium)	Frank Riseley; Paul de Borman	4; 6	6; 2	8; 6	7; 5
