= Paul de Borman =

Belgian tennis player

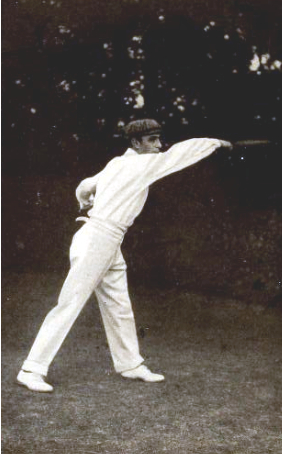
- Country (sports): Belgium
- Born: 1 December 1879 Saint-Josse-ten-Noode, Belgium
- Died: 21 April 1948 (aged 68) Ostend, Belgium
- Plays: Right-handed (one-handed backhand)

Grand Slam singles results
- Wimbledon: SF (1904)

Other tournaments
- WHCC: 3R (1914)

Grand Slam doubles results
- Wimbledon: SF (1902, 1904)

Grand Slam mixed doubles results
- Wimbledon: 3R (1914)

Team competitions
- Davis Cup: F (1904)

Paul de Borman (French pronunciation: [pɔl də bɔʁmɑ̃]; 1 December 1879 – 21 April 1948) was a Belgian tennis player who was active during the early part of the 20th century. He is regarded as a pioneer of Belgian tennis. From 1946 to 1947 he was president of the International Tennis Federation.

== Tennis career ==
De Borman was cofounder of the Royal Léopold Club in 1898. Between 1904 and 1919 he played in ten ties for the Belgian Davis Cup team, then called International Lawn Tennis Challenge. His best Davis Cup performance came in 1904 when, together with William le Maire de Warzée, they reached the final of the World Group in which they lost to the British Isles. That same year he reached the semifinal of the 1904 Wimbledon Championships in which he lost to Major Ritchie in straight sets.

In 1903 he won the Ostend International tournament beating American Clarence Hobart in the final.

De Borman was a nine-time Belgian national singles champion between 1898 and 1912. Afterwards he became chairman of the tennis department at the Royal Léopold Club in Brussels. In his book "Lawn Tennis at Home and Abroad" (1903) A. Wallis Myers describes De Borman: "His style is not graceful, but he plays a strong game and is plucky in a match. He has a difficult reverse cut service and a great forehand drive, which he takes at the top of the bound with a straight arm, which causes the ball to shoot when it touches the ground."

== Personal life ==
In 1907 Paul de Borman married Anne de Selliers de Moranville who participated in the tennis event at the 1920 and 1924 Olympic Games. Their children Geneviève (b. 1908), Léopold (b. 1909) and Myriam (b. 1915) also became Belgian tennis champions.

== Legacy ==
Since 1920 the prize for the junior championship of Belgium is called the Borman Cup. The stadium of the Royal Léopold Club, built in 1952, also carries his name.
