= 1905 Wimbledon Championships – Women's singles =

Women's singles
- 1905 Wimbledon Championships

Final
- Champion: (United States) May Sutton
- Runner-up: (United Kingdom) Dorothea Douglass
- Score: 6–3, 6–4

Details
- Draw: 45
- Seeds: –

Events
Singles	men	women
Doubles	men	women
- Wimbledon Championships

May Sutton defeated Constance Wilson 6–3, 8–6 in the All Comers' final, and then defeated the reigning champion Dorothea Douglass 6–3, 6–4 in the challenge round to win the ladies' singles tennis title at the 1905 Wimbledon Championships to become the first American female to win Wimbledon in singles. .

== Draw ==
Key

- Q = Qualifier
- WC = Wild card
- LL = Lucky loser
- Alt = Alternate
- ITF = ITF entry
- PR = Protected ranking
- SR = Special ranking
- SE = Special exempt
- JE = Junior exempt
- JR = Junior Accelerator Programme entrant
- CO = College Accelerator Programme entrant
- NG = Next Gen Accelerator Program entrant
- w/o = Walkover
- r = Retired
- d = Defaulted

=== Challenge round ===
Challenge Round
(United States) May Sutton	6	6
(United Kingdom) Dorothea Douglass	3	4

=== All comers' finals ===
Quarterfinals
(United Kingdom) HI Harper	2	4
(United Kingdom) Agnes Morton	6	6
(United States) May Sutton	8	6
(United Kingdom) Ethel Thomson	6	1
(United Kingdom) Blanche Hillyard	6	6
(United Kingdom) Dora Boothby	3	2
(United Kingdom) BM Holder	2	0
(United Kingdom) Constance Wilson	6	6

Semifinals
(United Kingdom) Agnes Morton	4	0
(United States) May Sutton	6	6
(United Kingdom) Blanche Hillyard	5	11	2
(United Kingdom) Constance Wilson	7	9	6

Final
(United States) May Sutton	6	8
(United Kingdom) Constance Wilson	3	6

=== Top half ===
==== Section 1 ====
First round

Second round
(United Kingdom) HI Harper
(United Kingdom) Mrs Armstrong	w/o
(United Kingdom) Madeline O'Neill
(United Kingdom) CB Bell	w/o
(United Kingdom) Alice Greene
(United Kingdom) Edith Greville	w/o
(United Kingdom) Agnes Morton	6	6
(United Kingdom) Mrs Macaulay	2	1

Third round
(United Kingdom) HI Harper	6	6
(United Kingdom) M O'Neill	2	2
(United Kingdom) A Greene	5	4
(United Kingdom) A Morton	7	6

Quarterfinals
(United Kingdom) HI Harper	2	4
(United Kingdom) A Morton	6	6

==== Section 2 ====
First round
(United Kingdom) D Spencer
(United Kingdom) Henrietta Horncastle	w/o
(United States) May Sutton	6	6
(United Kingdom) N Meyer	0	0
(United Kingdom) Ellen Mary Stawell-Brown	6	6
(United Kingdom) Aurea Farrington	3	1
(United Kingdom) Mildred Coles	6	6
(United Kingdom) E Flemmich	1	2
(United Kingdom) EE Sargeant	6	6
(United Kingdom) AG Ransome	1	0
(United Kingdom) Ethel Thomson
(United Kingdom) F Meyer	w/o
(United Kingdom) Mrs PM Morton
(United Kingdom) Violet Pinckney	w/o

Second round
(United Kingdom) Winifred Longhurst	6	6
(United Kingdom) D Spencer	2	0
(United States) M Sutton	6	6
(United Kingdom) Ellen Mary Stawell-Brown	3	1
(United Kingdom) M Coles	7	6
(United Kingdom) EE Sargeant	5	3
(United Kingdom) E Thomson	6	6
(United Kingdom) Mrs PM Morton	2	0

Third round
(United Kingdom) W Longhurst	3	1
(United States) M Sutton	6	6
(United Kingdom) M Coles	2	0
(United Kingdom) E Thomson	6	6

Quarterfinals
(United States) M Sutton	8	6
(United Kingdom) E Thomson	6	1

=== Bottom half ===
==== Section 3 ====
First round
(United Kingdom) Beryl Tulloch
(United Kingdom) K Kentish	w/o
(United Kingdom) L Ripley	6	5	6
(United Kingdom) Mrs Albury	0	7	3
(United Kingdom) Hilda Lane	6	6
(United Kingdom) E Smith	2	3
(United Kingdom) Blanche Hillyard	6	6
(United States) Maud Banks	0	0
(United Kingdom) LH Paterson	6	6
(United Kingdom) M Taplin	1	3
(United Kingdom) Gertrude Houselander	6	6
(United Kingdom) ME Brown	1	3

Second round
(United Kingdom) B Tulloch	7	6
(United Kingdom) L Ripley	5	3
(United Kingdom) H Lane	3	2
(United Kingdom) B Hillyard	6	6
(United Kingdom) LH Paterson	4	6	12
(United Kingdom) G Houselander	6	1	10
(United Kingdom) Dora Boothby	6	6
(United Kingdom) L Flemmich	2	4

Third round
(United Kingdom) B Tulloch	0	8	5
(United Kingdom) B Hillyard	6	6	7
(United Kingdom) LH Paterson	6	3	3
(United Kingdom) D Boothby	3	6	6

Quarterfinals
(United Kingdom) B Hillyard	6	6
(United Kingdom) D Boothby	3	2

==== Section 4 ====
First round

Second round
(United Kingdom) CHE Meyer
(United Kingdom) Mrs LR Hausberg	w/o
(United Kingdom) BM Holder	6	6
(United Kingdom) Edith Johnson	3	1
(United Kingdom) Mabel Squire	6	6
(United Kingdom) D Taplin	1	1
(United Kingdom) Constance Wilson	6	6
(United Kingdom) A Mooijaart	2	0

Third round
(United Kingdom) CHE Meyer	6	6	4
(United Kingdom) BM Holder	8	2	6
(United Kingdom) M Squire
(United Kingdom) C Wilson	w/o

Quarterfinals
(United Kingdom) BM Holder	2	0
(United Kingdom) C Wilson	6	6

Preceded by 1904 U.S. National Championships – Women's singles	Grand Slam women's singles	Succeeded by 1905 U.S. National Championships – Women's singles
