= 1904 Wimbledon Championships =

- Date: 20–29 June
- Edition: 28th
- Category: Grand Slam
- Surface: Grass
- Location: Worple Road; SW19, Wimbledon, London, United Kingdom
- Venue: All England Lawn Tennis and Croquet Club

Champions

Men's singles
- (United Kingdom) Laurence Doherty

Women's singles
- (United Kingdom) Dorothea Douglass

Men's doubles
- (United Kingdom) Laurence Doherty / (United Kingdom) Reginald Doherty
- Wimbledon Championships

The 1904 Wimbledon Championships took place on the outdoor grass courts at the All England Lawn Tennis and Croquet Club in Wimbledon, London, United Kingdom. The tournament ran from 20 June until 29 June. It was the 28th staging of the Wimbledon Championships, and the first Grand Slam tennis event of 1904. The entry for the men's singles rose to 62, beating the 1880 record of 60. All ten courts (rather than Centre Court only) were 'dressed' with a surround of canvas 3 feet (90 cm) high. The balls and equipment were provided by Slazenger.

== Champions ==
=== Men's singles ===
(United Kingdom) Laurence Doherty defeated (United Kingdom) Frank Riseley, 6–1, 7–5, 8–6

=== Women's singles ===
(United Kingdom) Dorothea Douglass defeated (United Kingdom) Charlotte Sterry 6–0, 6–3

=== Men's doubles ===
(United Kingdom) Laurence Doherty / (United Kingdom) Reginald Doherty defeated (United Kingdom) Frank Riseley / (United Kingdom) Sydney Smith, 6–1, 6–2, 6–4

Preceded by 1903 U.S. National Championships	Grand Slams	Succeeded by 1904 U.S. National Championships
