= Moifaa =

New Zealand racehorse

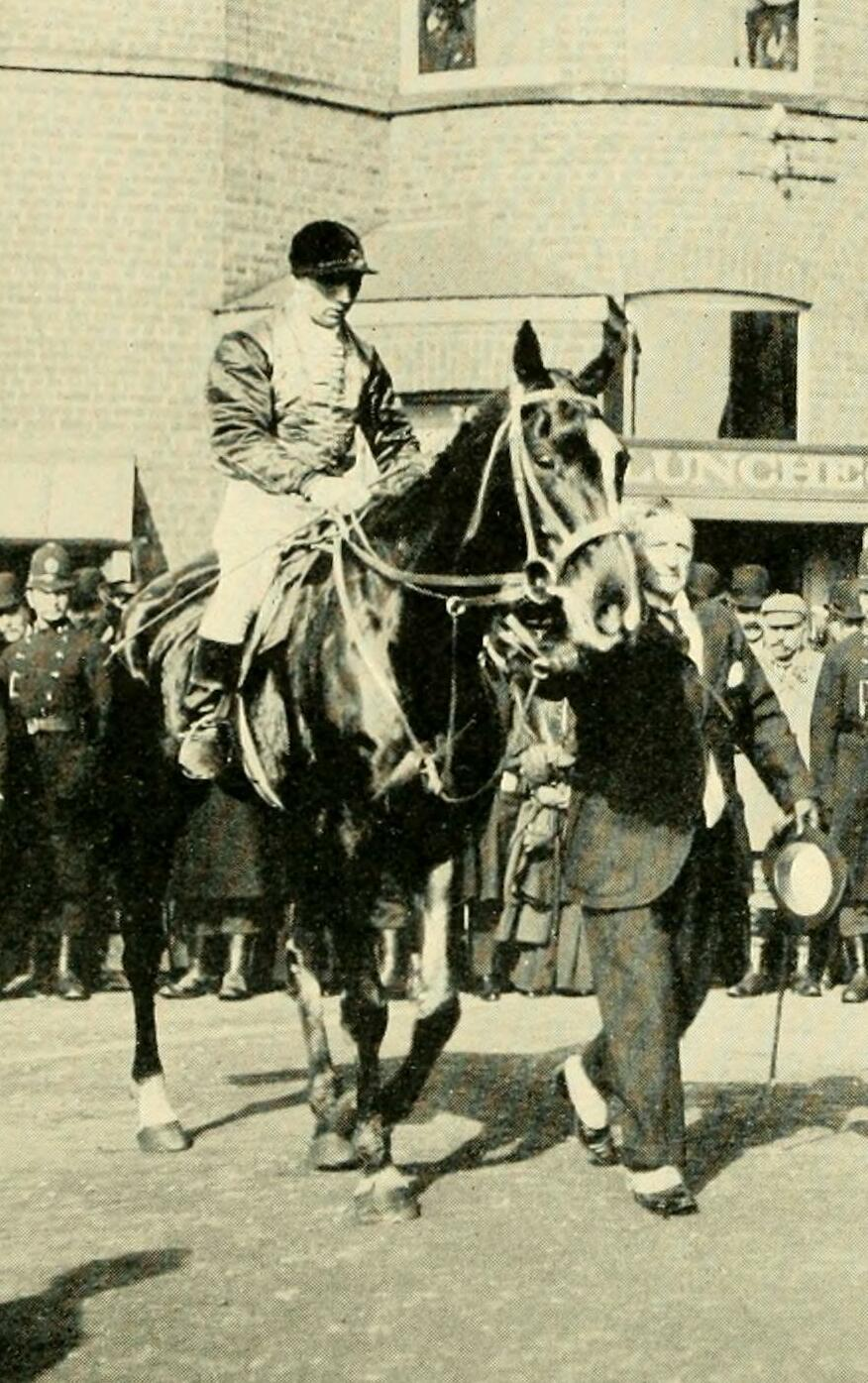
- Moifaa in the paddock at Aintree
- Sire: Natator
- Grandsire: Traducer
- Dam: Denbigh
- Damsire: The Painter
- Sex: Gelding
- Foaled: 1897
- Country: New Zealand
- Owner: Spencer Gollan
- Trainer: W. Hickey

Major wins
- Grand National (1904)

Honours
- New Zealand Racing Hall of Fame (2014)

Moifaa was a New Zealand-bred racehorse who won the 1904 Grand National by eight lengths. The jockey was Arthur Birch and the owner at the time was Spencer Gollan.

Moifaa won the Great Northern Steeplechase at Ellerslie Racecourse in Auckland, New Zealand.

After winning the Grand National the 17 hand gelding was purchased for King Edward VII, but never won again and was soon thereafter retired to the hunting fields of Leicestershire. Moifaa was present at the King’s funeral in 1910 ridden by the king’s friend, Major General John Brocklehurst.

The popular story that Moifaa survived a shipwreck before winning the Grand National is not true. Another contender in the 1904 Grand National, an Australian-bred gelding named Kiora, did survive a shipwreck off the coast of Cape Town in October 1899, where he was found standing on a rock near the site of the wreck. Another horse on board named Chesney allegedly swam a great distance to shore.

== See also ==
- List of racehorses
