= Frank Mason (jockey) =

Personal information
- Full name: Francis Mason
- Nickname: "Titch" (or "Tich")
- Nationality: English
- Born: 4 April 1879 Liverpool, England
- Died: 23 October 1969 (aged 90) Moreton, Cheshire, England
- Occupation: Jockey

Horse racing career
- Sport: Horse racing
- Career wins: >720

Honors
- Irish jump racing Champion Jockey, 1900; British jump racing Champion Jockey, 1901, 1902, 1904, 1905, 1906, 1907

Significant horses
- Kirkland

Frank "Titch" Mason (born Francis Mason, 4 April 1879 – 23 October 1969) was an English jockey who was British jump racing Champion Jockey six times between 1901 and 1907, winning the Grand National in 1905 on the horse Kirkland.

== Biography ==
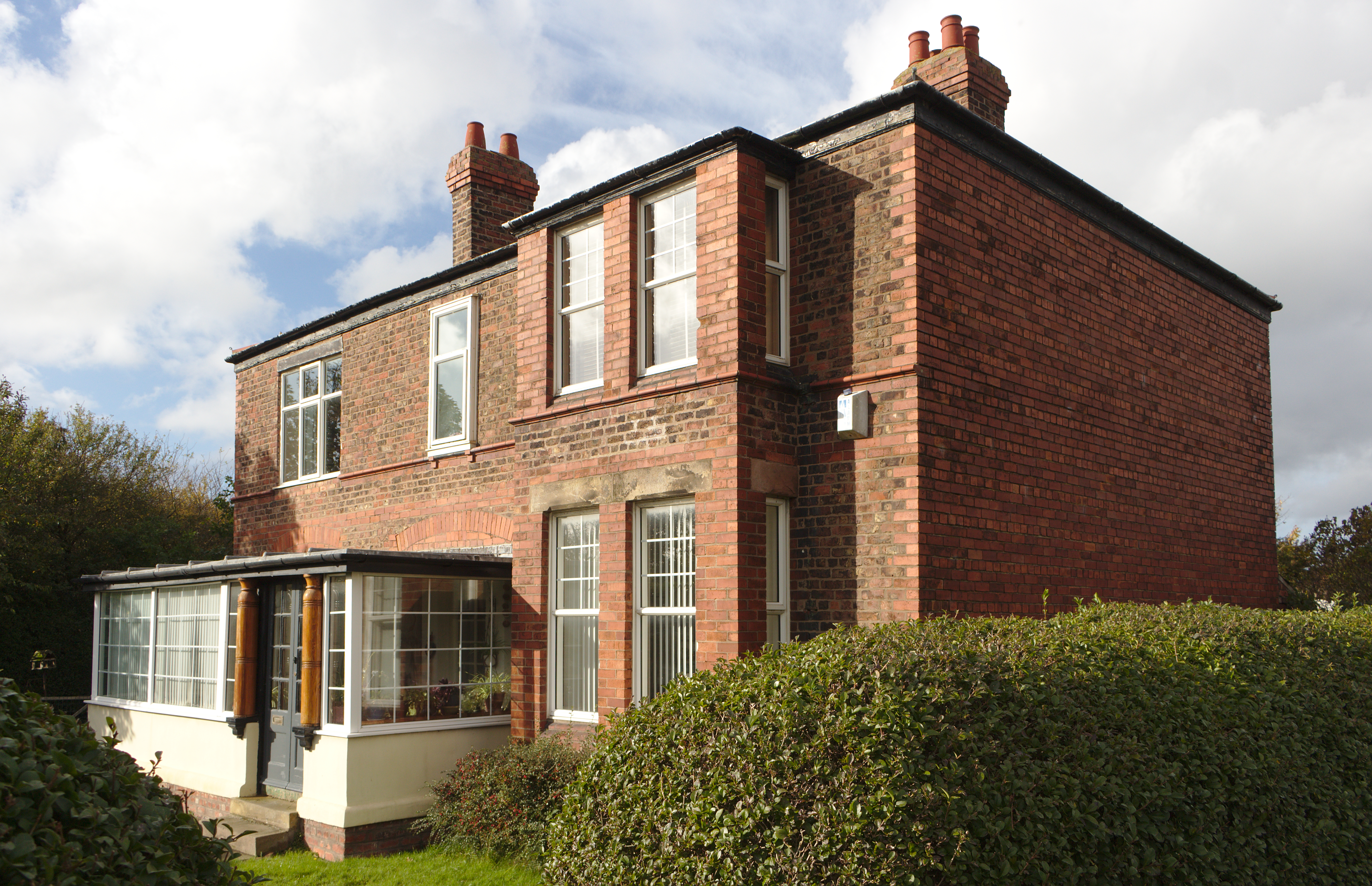
Former home of Frank Mason named "Kirkland"

Born in Liverpool, Mason grew up in nearby Wavertree before moving with his parents to the Wirral. In 1891, he was apprenticed to the riding stables of trainer John Gubbins in Telscombe, Sussex. Aged 14, he rode his first winner at The Curragh in Ireland on 18 April 1893. He was Irish jump racing Champion Jockey in 1900.

In Britain, he became one of the top jump jockeys of the era, and was Champion Jockey in 1901 (with 58 winners), 1902 (67 winners), 1904 (54 winners), 1905 (73 winners), 1906 (58 winners) and 1907 (59 winners). He rode five winners in a day on two occasions, at Lingfield in 1903 and Manchester in 1905. Also in 1905, he was paid £300 not to ride for two weeks before the Grand National, to ensure that he would be fit and free of injury. Riding on Kirkland, he won the race by three lengths. He also won the Grand Sefton Chase at Aintree on three occasions (1898, 1902, 1908), the Stanley Chase (1899), the Champion Chase (1902), the Lancashire Chase (1905), the Imperial Cup (1910), and the Welsh Grand National (1910). He retired in 1913, but returned to the saddle in 1919, winning the Liverpool Hurdle. He broke his leg in a fall later that year, ending his career. In all he rode more than 720 winners.

After retiring, he lived at Moreton on the Wirral in a house named "Kirkland" after his Grand National winner. He invested some of his winnings in building many of the shop premises around Moreton Cross, adding the names of some of his winning horses to the frontages. He died at Moreton in 1969, aged 90. The following year, his daughter scattered his ashes at the start of the Grand National course at Aintree, in the presence of the owner, Mirabel Topham.
