= William le Maire de Warzée d'Hermalle =

Belgian tennis player

William le Maire de Warzée
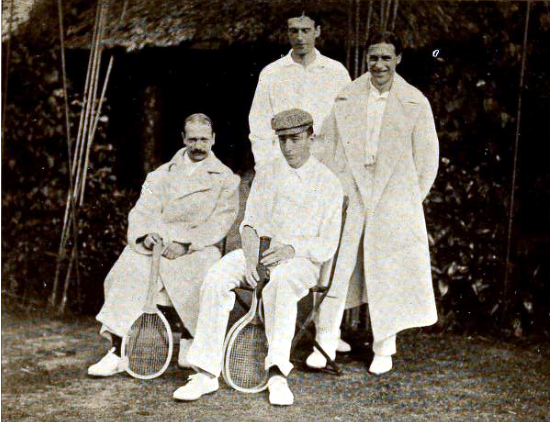
- William le Maire de Warzée at left at the 1904 Davis Cup
- Full name: Marie-Charles-William le Maire de Warzée d'Hermalle
- Country (sports): Belgium
- Born: 7 March 1879
- Died: 1966 (aged 86–87)

Grand Slam singles results
- Wimbledon: QF (1904, 1908)

Other tournaments
- WHCC: 2R (1922)

Grand Slam doubles results
- Wimbledon: SF (1902, 1904)

Team competitions
- Davis Cup: F (1904)

William "Willy" le Maire de Warzée d'Hermalle (French pronunciation: [wiljam lə mɛːʁ də vaʁtse dɛʁmal]; 7 March 1879 –1966) was a Belgian tennis player. He has been named as among the best male tennis players in Belgian history.

Le Maire de Warzée d'Hermalle reached the quarterfinals of Wimbledon in 1904 and 1908.

Le Maire de Warzée d'Hermalle was born into the Belgian nobility, the son of Marie-Léon-Hubert le Maire Warzée d'Hermalle (born 1848) and Noëmie Constance Caroline Georgine Valérie de Warzée d'Hermalle (born in Beaufays in 1850). His elder brother, Marie-Georges-Gérard-Léon le Maire de Warzée d'Hermalle, Baron de Warzée d'Hermalle (1877–1931), was a diplomat and Belgian ambassador to Iran, Japan and China, who married Dorothy Hall, daughter of Irish writer Owen Hall.
