= Arthur Cronin =

Tennis player

- Full name: Arthur Knox Cronin
- Country (sports): United Kingdom
- Born: 29 November 1867; London, United Kingdom
- Died: 30 November 1926 (aged 59); Wimbledon, Surrey, United Kingdom
- Turned pro: 1888 (amateur tour)
- Retired: 1911

Singles

Grand Slam singles results
- Wimbledon: QF (1905)

Arthur Cronin (29 November 1867 – 30 November 1926) was a British tennis player in the years before World War I. At Wimbledon he entered the singles four times between 1904 and 1910 and reached the quarter-finals in 1905 (winning just two games against Major Ritchie).
