= Frederick Plaskitt =

British tennis player

- Full name: Frederick James Wade Plaskitt
- Country (sports): United Kingdom
- Born: 24 December 1867; Lincoln, Lincolnshire, England
- Died: 10 November 1926 (aged 58); Watford, Hertfordshire, England
- Turned pro: 1892 (amateur tour)
- Retired: 1905

Singles

Grand Slam singles results
- Wimbledon: QF (1900)

Doubles

Grand Slam doubles results
- Wimbledon: SF (1903)

Frederick Plaskitt (24 December 1867 - 10 November 1926) was a British tennis player who played around the turn of the 20th century. He reached the men's singles quarterfinals at Wimbledon in 1900 (he beat Oswald Milne and Robert Hough before losing to losing to Arthur Gore). This was the only year he won a match in a Wimbledon singles career that lasted from 1896 to 1905. Plaskitt was author of the book Microscopic fresh water life.
