= Albert Curtis (tennis) =

Australian tennis player

- Country (sports): Australia
- Born: 26 January 1875 Adelong, New South Wales
- Died: 12 September 1933 (aged 58) Melbourne, Victoria
- College: Newington College; University of Sydney; University of Adelaide

Grand Slam singles results
- Australian Open: F (1905)

Albert C. "Snapper" Curtis (26 January 1875 – 12 September 1933) was an Australian tennis player and medical practitioner.

== Biography ==
Curtis was born in Adelong, New South Wales, and attended Newington College (1889–1892) where as a boarding student he was a noted sportsman. He matriculated in 1893 and became a first year medical student at the University of Sydney. In 1896, with David Edwards, Curtis won the Queensland Doubles Championship. In 1897 he was part of the University A Team in Tennis that included fellow Old Newingtonians David Edwards and Percy Colquhoun. In that year he won the NSW Championship. Curtis was at the University of Sydney until 1902 but was only in third year in 1896 and remained there until 1899. He finally passed the deferred third year exam in 1900. Curtis moved to South Australia and graduated in medicine from the University of Adelaide in 1905. He finished runner-up to Rodney Heath in the singles final of the inaugural Australasian Championships, the future Australian Open, in 1905.

Curtis was medical superintendent of the Beechworth Asylum before his death in Melbourne on 12 September 1933, aged 58.

== Grand Slam finals ==
=== Singles (1 runner-up) ===
Result	Year	Championship	Surface	Opponent	Score
Loss	1905	Australasian Championships	Grass	(Australia) Rodney Heath	6–4, 3–6, 4–6, 4–6
