= May Sutton =

American tennis player (1886–1975)

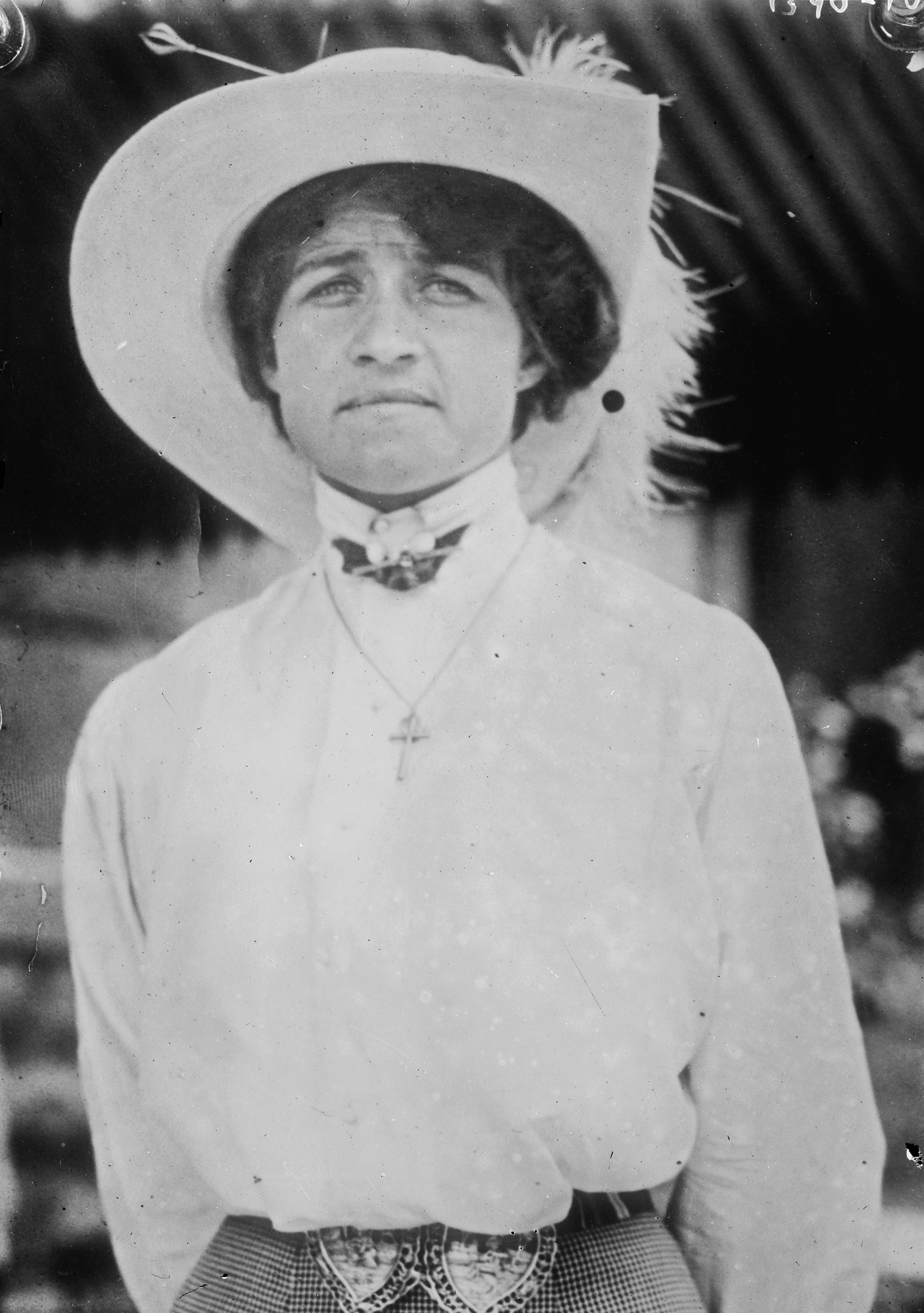
- May Sutton in 1912
- Full name: May Godfrey Sutton Bundy
- Country (sports): United States
- Born: September 25, 1886 Plymouth, England
- Died: October 4, 1975 (aged 88) Santa Monica, California, US
- Height: 5 ft 4.5 in (1.64 m)
- Plays: Right-handed
- Int. Tennis HoF: 1956 (member page)

Grand Slam singles results
- French Open: 2R (1929)
- Wimbledon: W (1905, 1907)
- US Open: W (1904)

Grand Slam doubles results
- US Open: W (1904)

Grand Slam mixed doubles results
- US Open: F (1904)

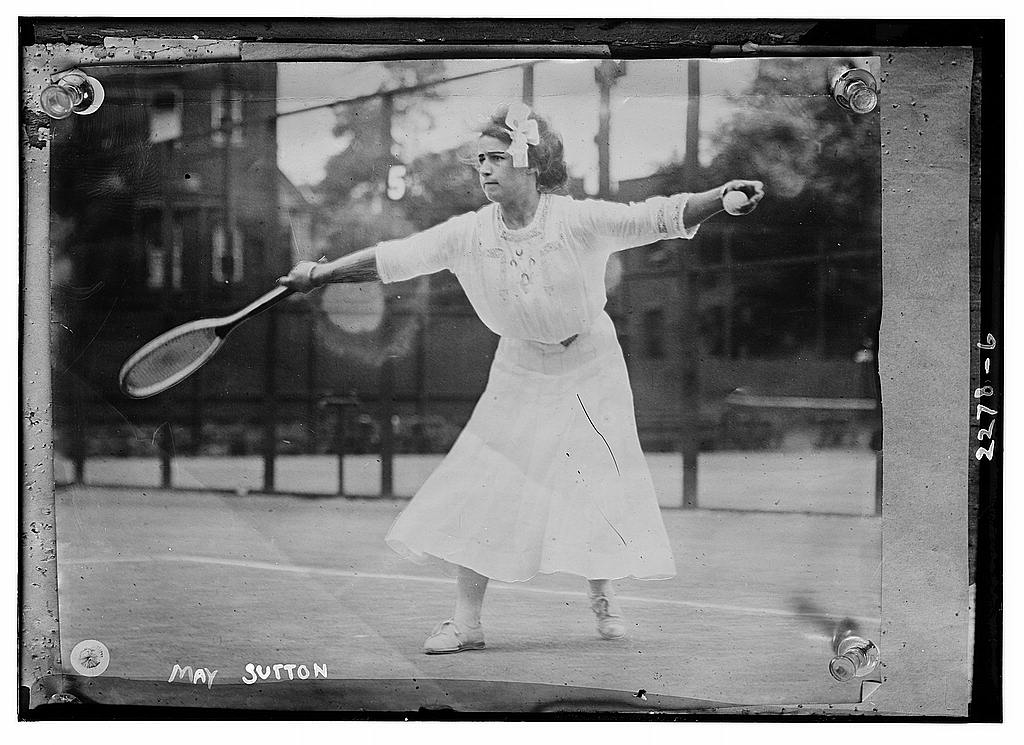
May Sutton (between ca. 1910 and ca. 1915)

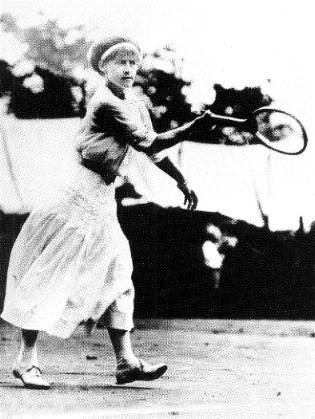
May Sutton

May Sutton Bundy (née Godfrey Sutton, September 25, 1886 – October 4, 1975) was an American tennis player who was active during the first decades of the 20th century. At age 17, she won the singles title at the U.S. National Championships and in 1905 she became the first American to win the singles title at Wimbledon and thereby the first woman to win two different grand slams.

== Biography ==
May Sutton was born on September 25, 1886 in Plymouth, England, the youngest of seven children of Adolphus DeGrouchy Sutton, a captain in the Royal Navy and Adeline Esther Godfray. When she was six years old, Sutton's family moved to a ranch near Pasadena, California. It was there that she and her sisters played tennis on a court built by her father. As young ladies, May and her sisters, Violet, Florence, and Ethel, dominated the California tennis circuit. In addition to being accomplished tennis players, the girls were excellent basketball players. May, Florence and Violet were all on the Pasadena High School basketball team, which went undefeated in 1900. In 1904 at age 17 years and 9 months, May Sutton won the singles title at the U.S. Championships on her first attempt and became the youngest US champion in history. She also teamed with Miriam Hall to win the women's doubles title and came close to making it a clean sweep by advancing to the mixed doubles final.

She was unable to defend her U.S. title as she traveled to England in May 1905 to compete in the Wimbledon Championships. In June, she won the grass court Northern Championships in Manchester, defeating Hilda Lane in the final. Sutton became the first American and first non-British woman to win the Wimbledon singles title when she beat British star and reigning two-time Wimbledon champion Dorothea Douglass Chambers in the challenge round. She did it while shocking the British audience by rolling up her sleeves to bare her elbows and wearing a skirt that showed her ankles. For the next two years, she and Chambers met in the final, with Chambers recapturing the title in 1906 and Sutton winning it back in 1907.

Sutton was the 1908 Rose Parade Queen in Pasadena.

On December 11, 1912, she married Tom Bundy, who was a three-time winner of the men's doubles title at the U.S. Championships, and semi-retired to raise a family. However, in 1921 at the age of 35, she made a comeback and became the fourth-ranked player in the U.S. In 1925, she was a women's doubles finalist at the U.S. Championships and, although almost forty years of age, her game was strong enough to be selected for America's Wightman Cup team. In 1922 and 1923, she won the women's singles in the Ojai Tennis Tournament. She was a Wimbledon quarterfinalist in 1929 at the age of 42, which was the first time she had played Wimbledon since 1907. In 1928 and 1929, she and her daughter Dorothy Cheney became the only mother/daughter combination to be seeded at the U.S. Championships. Her nephew, John Doeg, won the U.S. Championships in 1930, and in 1938, daughter Dorothy won the Australian Championships.

In 1956, Sutton was inducted into the International Tennis Hall of Fame. She never stopped playing tennis and was playing regularly well into her late 80s.

Sutton died of cancer on October 4, 1975, in Santa Monica, California and was interred in the local Woodlawn Memorial Cemetery.

== Playing style ==
Eight-time U.S. National Championship winner Molla Bjurstedt Mallory indicated that Sutton was the best player she had met. "Her drive was the fastest and the...most difficult...to handle, because it dove suddenly to the ground and then jumped up unexpectedly with queer curves. When she could keep her drives near the baseline, they either forced me back farther than I had been accustomed to play or compelled me to make errors. She was also strong overhead when she came to the net and altogether had more power and effectiveness than any other woman tennis player of her time". Sutton played with an extreme Western grip and had a powerful topspin forehand that made the ball dip and bound high.

== Grand Slam finals ==
=== Singles : 3 titles, 1 runner-up ===
Result	Year	Championship	Surface	Opponent	Score
Win	1904	U.S. Championships	Grass	(United States) Elisabeth Moore	6–1, 6–2
Win	1905	Wimbledon	Grass	(United Kingdom of Great Britain and Ireland) Dorothea Douglass Chambers	6–3, 6–4
Loss	1906	Wimbledon	Grass	(United Kingdom of Great Britain and Ireland) Dorothea Douglass Chambers	3–6, 7–9
Win	1907	Wimbledon	Grass	(United Kingdom of Great Britain and Ireland) Dorothea Douglass Chambers	6–1, 6–4

=== Doubles : 1 title, 1 runner-up ===
Result	Year	Championship	Surface	Partner	Opponents	Score
Win	1904	U.S. Championships	Grass	(United States) Miriam Hall	(United States) Elisabeth Moore (United States) Carrie Neely	3–6, 6–3, 6–3
Loss	1925	U.S. Championships	Grass	(United States) Elizabeth Ryan	(United States) Mary K. Browne (United States) Helen Wills	4–6, 3–6

== Additional sources ==
- Hult, Joan S.; Trekell, Marianna (1991). A Century of women's basketball : from frailty to final four. Reston, Va: National Association for Girls and Women in Sport. ISBN 9780883144909.
