= Gore–Wilding rivalry =

Tennis rivalry

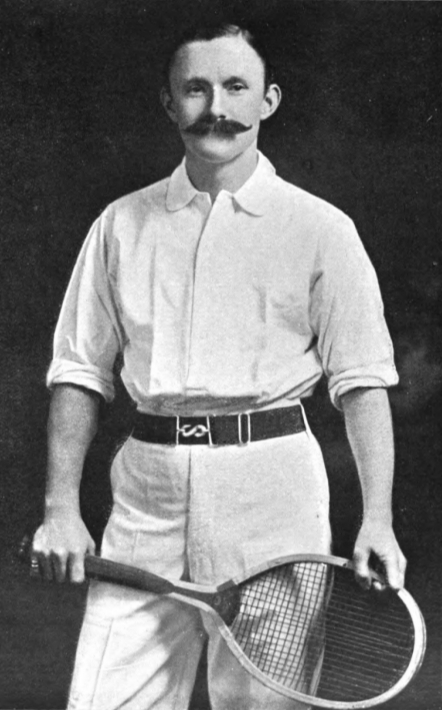
Arthur Gore (3 Major singles, 1 Major doubles, 2 Olympic Golds, singles, World No.1 )

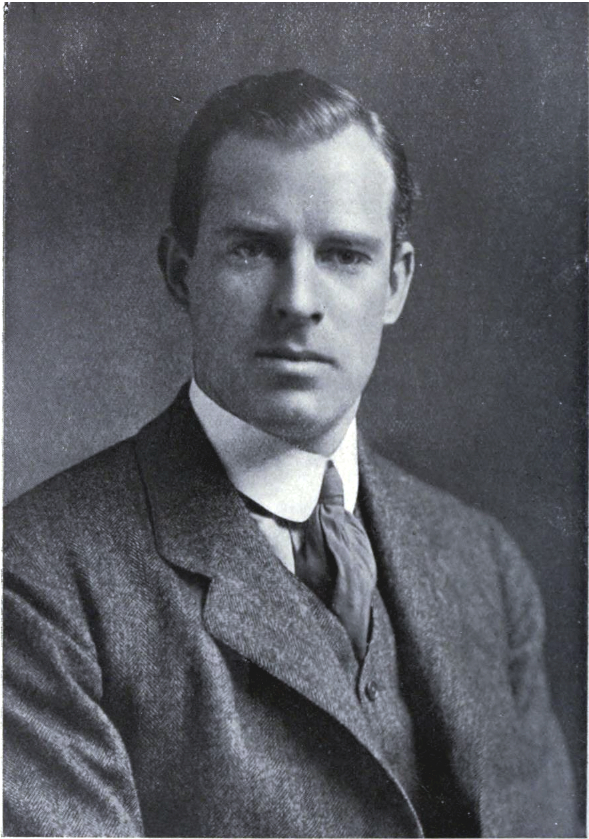
Anthony Wilding (9 Major singles, 5 Major doubles, 1 Olympic Bronze singles, World No.1)

This was a tennis rivalry played between British player Arthur Gore and the New Zealand player Anthony Wilding, who in their respective careers met 14 times from 1905 until 1912.

Gore and Wilding were both former World number 1 and both Grand Slam winners with Gore winning three slam titles and two olympic golds and Wilding winning six slam titles and three world championship titles both Davis Cup champions.

They first met in 1905 at the East Surrey Championships in the neighborhood of East Croydon (now part of Greater London). Gore was 37 years old when he first met 22 years old Wilding. At the Grand Slam tournaments they met four times all at Wimbledon and were tied (2-2) in matches they met in the quarter-finals and semi finals twice and two times in the challenge round, Wilding was the challenger to Gore defending the title in 1910 with Wilding winning two years later in 1912 roles reversed and Gore was the challenger with Wilding successfully defending his tile.

They played each other predominately on grass courts but also on clay courts and indoors on wood courts.

== Challenge rounds ==
Challenge Round: the championship round of a tournament, in which the winner of a single-elimination tournament phase (called then The All-Comers' Tournament), challenges the holder of the tournament (the winner of the last edition, often the previous year but not always, of the tournament) who plays only that last match to decide the new champion. The challenge round was used in the early history of tennis in many tournaments, but not all, from 1878 through 1921 (in 1876 and 1877 there was no challenge rounds given that the first tournaments were created). The Challenge Round system was still used later for nations in the Davis Cup until 1971 included.

== Head-to-head ==
=== Official matches (Gore 9–5 Wilding) ===
Legend (Gore-Wilding)
Grand Slams (2-2)

No.	Year	Tournament	Surface	Round	Winner	Score
1.	1905	East Surrey Championships	Grass	F	(United Kingdom) Gore	6–3, 6–3, 6–1
2.	1905	Wimbledon Championships	Grass	QF	(United Kingdom) Gore	8–6, 6–2, 6–2
3.	1905	Crystal Palace Open	Grass	F	(United Kingdom) Gore	6-4 6–2
4.	1905	Shanklin Open	Grass	F	(United Kingdom) Gore	6–2, 6–3, 4–6, 6–1,
5.	1905	London Covered Court Championships	Hard (i)	SF	(United Kingdom) Gore	3-6 7-5 6-1 6–1
6.	1906	South of France Championships	Clay	SF	(New Zealand) Wilding	6-2 6–0
7.	1906	British Covered Court Championships	Hard (i)	F	(United Kingdom) Gore	4-6 2-6 6-0 8-6 6–3
8.	1906	Wimbledon Championships	Grass	SF	(United Kingdom) Gore	9–7, 6–1, 8–6
9.	1907	Kent Championships	Grass	CR	(New Zealand) Wilding	9–7, 6–2, 3–6, 0–6, 6–1
10.	1907	Davis Cup	Grass	RR	(United Kingdom) Gore	6–3, 6–4
11.	1908	British Covered Court Championships	Hard (i)	CR	(United Kingdom) Gore	4–6, 8–6, 6–0, 8–6
12.	1910	Wimbledon Championships	Grass	CR	(New Zealand) Wilding	6–4, 7–5, 4–6, 6–2
13.	1912	Kent Championships	Grass	QF	(New Zealand) Wilding	6–1, 0–6, 14–12
14.	1912	Wimbledon Championships	Grass	CR	(New Zealand) Wilding	6–4, 6–4, 4–6, 6–4

== Breakdown of their rivalry ==
- All matches: Gore, 9–5
- Outdoor courts: Gore, 6–5
- Clay courts: Wilding, 1–0
- Grass courts: Gore, 6–4
- Indoor hard courts: Gore, 3–0
- Grand Slam matches: Tied, 2–2
- Grand Slam finals: Wilding, 2–0
- Davis Cup matches: Gore, 1–0
- All finals: Gore, 5–3

== See also ==
- List of tennis rivalries

== Sources ==
- https://app.thetennisbase.com/Wilding v Gore, head to head matches 1905-1912.
