= Arthur Gore (tennis) =

British tennis player

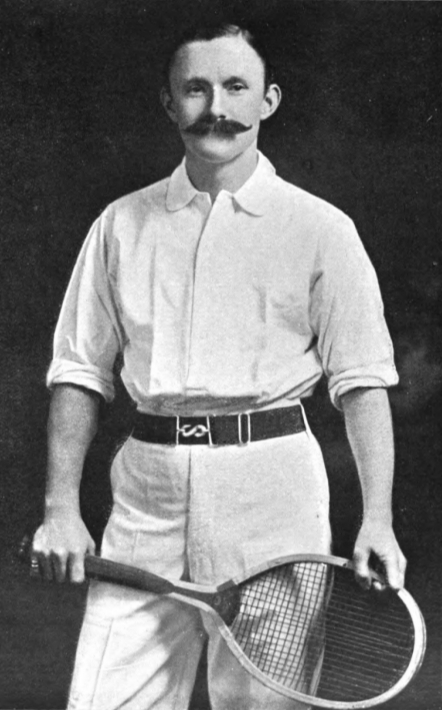
- Full name: Arthur William Charles Wentworth Gore
- Country (sports): United Kingdom
- Born: 2 January 1868 Lyndhurst, England
- Died: 1 December 1928 (aged 60) Kensington, England
- Turned pro: 1888 (amateur tour)
- Retired: 1927
- Plays: Right-handed (one-handed backhand)
- Int. Tennis HoF: 2006 (member page)

Singles
- Career record: 373–127 (74.6%)
- Career titles: 51
- Highest ranking: No. 1 (1901, ITHF)

Grand Slam singles results
- Wimbledon: W (1901, 1908, 1909)
- US Open: SF (1900)

Other tournaments
- WHCC: 2R (1912, 1914)
- WCCC: 1R (1921)

Doubles

Grand Slam doubles results
- Wimbledon: W (1909)

Other doubles tournaments
- WHCC: F (1914)

Grand Slam mixed doubles results
- Wimbledon: 2R (1913, 1922)

Team competitions
- Davis Cup: W (1912)
Medal record
Representing Great Britain
Tennis, Summer Olympics
Gold medal – first place	1908 London	Indoor Singles
Gold medal – first place	1908 London	Indoor Doubles

Arthur William Charles Wentworth Gore (2 January 1868 – 1 December 1928) was a British tennis player.

He is best known for winning three singles titles at the Wimbledon Championship and was runner-up a record 5 times (shared with Herbert Lawford). He also won gold medals at the 1908 Summer Olympics in London, England, winning the Men's Indoor Singles and the Men's Indoor Doubles (with Herbert Barrett). He also competed at the 1912 Summer Olympics in Stockholm, Sweden. Gore's Wimbledon win in 1909, at age 41, makes him the oldest person to date to win a Grand Slam singles title.

== Early life ==
Gore was born in Lyndhurst, Hampshire, and grew up in France, the third son of Captain Augustus Frederick Wentworth Gore and Hon. Emily Anne Curzon. His father was the sole surviving son of noted novelist Catherine Gore and Charles Arthur Gore. His mother was a member of the Curzon family, the daughter of MP Robert Curzon and granddaughter of Viscount Curzon.

== Career ==
He played his first tournament at London Athletic Club in 1887, and his first title came at a grass court tournament in Stevenage in August 1888. Gore won the singles title at the Scottish Championships in 1892 and successfully defended the title in the Challenge Round in 1893. In 1894 he won the North London Championships on grass, a tournament that he won five times (1894, 1898, 1899, 1900, 1906). He won the singles title at the Kent Championships on two occasions; in 1900 by defeating Harold Mahony in the final in straight sets, and in 1906 against A.L. Bentley, also in straight sets. In 1904 he won the City of Paris Championships in Puteaux, Paris against Max Decugis. and in 1906 against A.L. In 1900 and 1908 he won the singles title at the British Covered Court Championships, played at the Queen's Club in London.

In May 1908 he won the singles title at the British Covered Court Championships, played at the Queen's Club in London, defeating New Zealander Anthony Wilding in the Challenge Round in four sets. Gore had the longest ever span (34 years) in the Wimbledon men's singles (he entered a record 30 times in singles from 1888 to 1922)., In addition he also won the Leicestershire Championships three times (1913, 1914, 1919) and the Nottinghamshire Championships four times (1905, 1910, 1912, 1913). He also holds the all-time record for the longest tennis career of any player between their first and last titles, that being 30 years, 11 months and one day. Gore was a successful all surface player winning 51 singles titles and reaching the finals of 26 other tournaments on clay, grass and hard asphalt & wood courts from 1888 to 1919.

Gore was inducted into the International Tennis Hall of Fame in 2006.

== Grand Slam finals ==
=== Singles: 8 (3 titles, 5 runner-ups) ===
Result	Year	Championship	urface	Opponent	Score
Loss	1899	Wimbledon	Grass	(United Kingdom of Great Britain and Ireland) Reginald Doherty	6–1, 6–4, 3–6, 3–6, 3–6
Win	1901	Wimbledon	Grass	(United Kingdom of Great Britain and Ireland) Reginald Doherty	4–6, 7–5, 6–4, 6–4
Loss	1902	Wimbledon	Grass	(United Kingdom of Great Britain and Ireland) Laurence Doherty	4–6, 3–6, 6–3, 0–6
Loss	1907	Wimbledon	Grass	(Australia) Norman Brookes	4–6, 2–6, 2–6
Win	1908	Wimbledon	Grass	(United Kingdom of Great Britain and Ireland) Herbert Roper Barrett	6–3, 6–2, 4–6, 3–6, 6–4
Win	1909	Wimbledon	Grass	(United Kingdom of Great Britain and Ireland) Major Ritchie	6–8, 1–6, 6–2, 6–2, 6–2
Loss	1910	Wimbledon	Grass	(New Zealand) Anthony Wilding	4–6, 5–7, 6–4, 2–6
Loss	1912	Wimbledon	Grass	(New Zealand) Anthony Wilding	4–6, 4–6, 6–4, 4–6

=== Doubles: 3 (1 title, 2 runner-ups) ===
Result	Year	Championship	urface	Partner	Opponents	Score
Loss	1908	Wimbledon	Grass	(United Kingdom of Great Britain and Ireland) Herbert Roper Barrett	(United Kingdom of Great Britain and Ireland) Major Ritchie (New Zealand) Anthony Wilding	1–6, 2–6, 6–1, 7–9
Win	1909	Wimbledon	Grass	(United Kingdom of Great Britain and Ireland) Herbert Roper Barrett	(Australia) Stanley Doust (New Zealand) Harry Parker	6–2, 6–1, 6–4
Loss	1910	Wimbledon	Grass	(United Kingdom of Great Britain and Ireland) Herbert Roper Barrett	(United Kingdom of Great Britain and Ireland) Major Ritchie (New Zealand) Anthony Wilding	1–6, 1–6, 2–6

== World Championships finals ==
=== Doubles ===
Result	Year	Championship	Surface	Partner	Opponents	Score
Loss	1914	World Hard Court Championships	Clay	(United Kingdom) Algernon Kingscote	(France) Max Decugis (France) Maurice Germot	6–1, 11–9, 6–8, 6–2

== Performance timeline ==
Key
W	F	SF	QF	#R	RR	Q#	DNQ	A	NH

(W) winner; (F) finalist; (SF) semifinalist; (QF) quarterfinalist; (#R) rounds 4, 3, 2, 1; (RR) round-robin stage; (Q#) qualification round; (DNQ) did not qualify; (A) absent; (NH) not held; (SR) strike rate (events won / competed); (W–L) win–loss record.

Events with a challenge round: (W_{C}) won; (CR) lost the challenge round; (F_{A}) all comers' finalist

	1888	1889	1890	1891	1892	1893	1894	1895	1896	1897	1898	1899	1900	1901	1902	1903	1904	1905	1906	1907	1908		1909	1910	1911	1912		1913	1914	1915	'16–'18	1919	1920	1921	1922	SR	W–L	Win %
Grand Slam tournaments																																				3 / 31	67–27	71.28
French	not held			only for French club members																																0 / 0	0–0	–
Wimbledon	2R	1R	1R	2R	QF	2R	1R	A	1R	2R	SF	CR	F_{A}	W_{C}	CR	2R	QF	SF	F_{A}	F	W		W_{C}	CR	4R	CR		4R	QF	not held		1R	2R	1R	1R	3 / 30	64–26	71.1
U.S.	A	A	A	A	A	A	A	A	A	A	A	A	4R	A	A	A	A	A	A	A	A		A	A	A	A		A	A	A	A	A	A	A	A	0 / 1	3–1	75.0
Australian	not held																	A	A	A	A		A	A	A	A		A	A	A	NH	A	A	A	A	0 / 0	0–0	–
Win–loss	0–1	0–1	0–1	1–1	2–1	1–1	0–1	0–0	0–1	1–0	3–1	5–1	7–2	6–0	0–1	1–1	2–1	4–1	5–1	5–1	6–0		1–0	0–1	3–1	6–1		3–1	4–1	0–0	0–0	0–1	1–1	0–1	0–1			
National representation
Olympics	Not held								A	Not held			A	Not held			A	Not held			A	G	Not held			A	2R	Not held					A	Not held		1 / 2	3–2	60.0

== Career finals ==
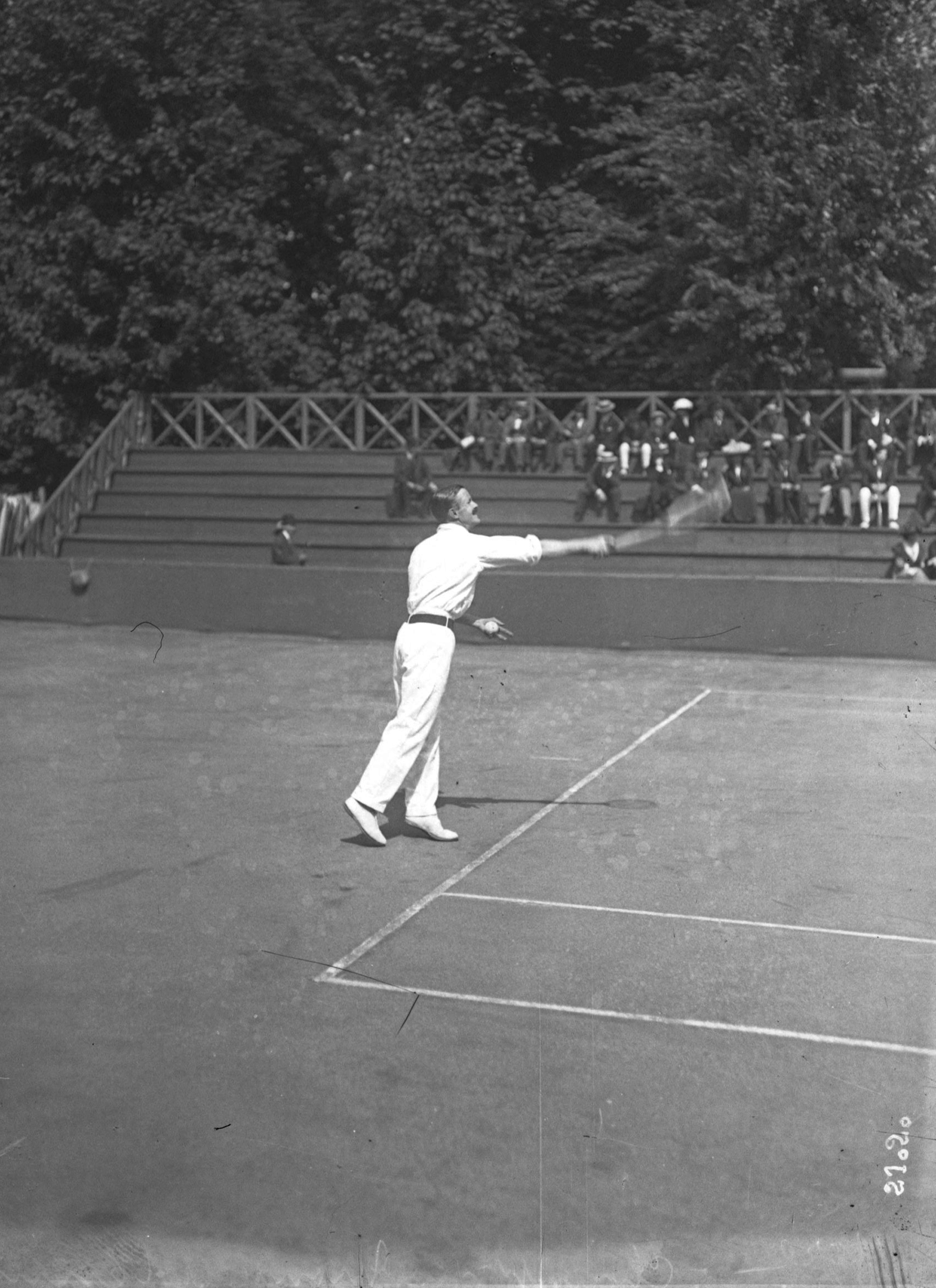
Gore at the 1912 World Hard Court Championships in Paris.

=== Singles 77 (51 titles, 26 runner-ups) ===
Legend Grand Slam/Important tournaments (3–5) Olympic Games (1–0)	Titles by surface Wood (6–5) Clay (11–1) Grass (32–18)	Titles by location Outdoors (45–21) Indoors (5–4)

Result	No.	Date	Tournament	Surface	Opponent	Score
Win	1.	1888	Stevenage LTC Championships	Grass	(United Kingdom) George Ernest Brown	0–6, 6–1, 6–4
Win	2.	1888	Hitchin LTC Championships	Grass	(United Kingdom) Arthur Hallward	3–6, 6–3, 6–3
Win	3.	1889	Dinard Challenge Cup	Clay	(United Kingdom) Réginald Forbes	6–4, 6–3, 6–3
Win	4.	1890	Chingford Open Championships	Clay	(United Kingdom) Charles Gladstone Eames	3–6, 6–3, 7–5, 4–6, 6–2
Win	5.	1890	Dinard Challenge Cup	Clay	(United Kingdom) Horace Chapman	6–3, 3–6, 7–5, 6–4
Loss	1.	1891	Kent Championships	Grass	(United Kingdom) Ernest George Meers	0–6, 2–6, 2–6
Win	6.	1891	Chingford Open Championships	Clay	(United Kingdom) Charles G. Eames	10–12, 2–6, 6–2, 6–3, 6–3
Win	7.	1891	Dinard Challenge Cup	Clay	(United Kingdom) Horace Chapman	11–9 ret.
Win	8.	1892	Scottish Championships	Grass	(Scotland) Richard Millar Watson	6–3, 6–3, 6–0
Win	9.	1892	Chingford Open Championships	Clay	(United Kingdom) Charles G. Eames	6–4, 6–2, 6–1
Win	10.	1892	Dinard Challenge Cup	Clay	(United Kingdom) Archdale Palmer	6–3, 6–2, 1–6, 5–7, 6–3
Win	11.	1893	Scottish Championships	Grass	(Scotland) Richard Millar Watson	6–3, 7–5, 4–6, 7–5
Win	12.	1893	Dinard Challenge Cup	Clay	(United Kingdom) Archdale Palmer	3–6, 6–4, 0–6, 8–6, 6–3
Win	13.	1894	North London Championships	Grass	(United Kingdom) Arthur Hallward	4–6, 6–2, 6–3, 6–2
Loss	3.	1896	North London Championships	Grass	(United Kingdom) Herbert Roper Barrett	3–6 4–6 6–3 2–6
Win	14.	1898	North London Championships	Grass	(United Kingdom) Herbert Roper Barrett	6–3, 2–6, 6–3, 6–3
Win	15.	1898	Dinard Challenge Cup	Clay	(United Kingdom) E. K. Harvey	6–2, 6–2, 6–0
Loss	4.	1899	Wimbledon Championships	Grass	(United Kingdom) Reginald Doherty	6–1, 6–4, 3–6, 3–6, 3–6
Win	16.	1899	North London Championships	Grass	(United Kingdom) Herbert Roper Barrett	6–2, 8–6, 9–7
Loss	5.	1896	London Championships	Grass	(United Kingdom) Harold Mahony	10–8, 2–6, 5–7, 1–6
Loss	6.	1899	Dinard Challenge Cup	Clay	(United Kingdom) Harold Mahony	4–6 2–6 4–6
Win	17.	1900	British Covered Court Championships	Wood (i)	(United Kingdom) Major Ritchie	6–1, 7–5, 6–3
Loss	7.	1900	Irish Championships	Grass	(United Kingdom) Harold Mahony	4–6, 5–7, 9–7, 3–6
Loss	8.	1900	Middlesex Championships	Grass	(United Kingdom) Harold Mahony	2–6 4–6 2–6
Win	18.	1900	Kent Championships	Grass	(United Kingdom) Harold Mahony	6–4, 6–4, 6–4
Win	19.	1900	North London Championships	Grass	(United Kingdom) Herbert Roper Barrett	6–3, 6–4, 6–0
Loss	9.	1900	Queen's Club Championships	Grass	(United Kingdom) Arthur W. Lavy	6–0, 6–2, 6–3
Loss	10.	1901	British Covered Court Championships	Wood (i)	(United Kingdom) Laurence Doherty	3–6, 1–6, 1–6
Loss	11.	1901	Kent Championships	Grass	(United Kingdom) Laurence Doherty	1–6, 3–6, 6–3, 4–6
Win	20.	1901	Wimbledon Championships	Grass	(United Kingdom) Reginald Doherty	4–6, 7–5, 6–4, 6–4
Loss	12.	1902	Wimbledon Championships	Grass	(United Kingdom) Laurence Doherty	4–6, 3–6, 6–3, 0–6
Loss	13.	1903	Kent Championships	Grass	(United Kingdom) Laurence Doherty	1–6, 2–6, 3–6
Win	21.	1903	All England Plate	Grass	(United States) Clarence Hobart	7–5, 6–3
Win	22.	1903	Etretat LTC Championships	Clay	(United Kingdom) Archdale Palmer	6–2, 6–3, 6–1
Win	23.	1903	London Covered Court Championships	Wood (i)	(United Kingdom) Major Ritchie	8–6, 1–6, 7–5, 6–4
Win	24.	1904	Paris International Championships	Clay	(France) Max Decugis	3–6, 5–7, 6–3, 7–5, 6–2
Loss	14.	1904	London Covered Court Championships	Wood (i)	(France) Max Decugis	2–6 6–3, 6–0, 1–6, 4–6
Loss	15.	1905	Kent Championships	Grass	(Australia) Norman Brookes	3–6, 7–9, 2–6
Win	25.	1905	East Surrey Championships	Grass	(New Zealand) Anthony Wilding	6–3, 6–3, 6–1
Win	26.	1905	Nottinghamshire Championships	Grass	(United Kingdom) Roy Allen	w.o.
Win	27.	1905	Crystal Palace Open	Grass	(New Zealand) Anthony Wilding	6–4, 6–2.
Win	28.	1905	Shanklin LTC Championships	Grass	(New Zealand) Anthony Wilding	6–2, 6–3, 4–6, 6–1
Win	29.	1905	London Covered Court Championships	Wood (i)	(United Kingdom) Major Ritchie	2–6 6–3, 6–0, 1–6, 4–6
Loss	16.	1906	British Covered Court Championships	Wood (i)	(United Kingdom) Laurence Doherty	2–6, 4–6, 6–8
Win	30.	1906	East Surrey Championships	Grass	(United Kingdom) Sydney Adams	6–2, 6–3, 6–4
Win	31.	1906	Kent Championships	Grass	(United Kingdom) A. L. Bentley	6–0 6–2 6–1
Win	32.	1906	North London Championships	Grass	(United Kingdom) Herbert Roper Barrett	4–6, 7–5, 7–5, 3–0, ret.
Win	33.	1906	Nottinghamshire Championships	Grass	(United Kingdom) Herbert Snook	6–2, 6–4, 6–3
Win	34.	1906	Crystal Palace Open	Grass	(United Kingdom) George Allen Thomas	6–1, 6–3
Win	35.	1906	Shanklin LTC Championships	Grass	(United Kingdom) George Caridia	6–1, 6–4, 6–4
Win	37.	1906	Sussex Championships	Grass	(United Kingdom) Major Ritchie	6–2, 6–3, 6–3
Win	38.	1907	Kent Coast Championships	Hard	(United Kingdom) Major Ritchie	7–5, 6–2, 4–6, ret.
Win	39.	1907	Surrey Championships	Hard	(United Kingdom) Major Ritchie	6–3, 6–2, 6–3
Loss	17.	1906	East of Surrey Championships	Grass	(United Kingdom) Major Ritchie	6–0, 6–2, 2–6, 3–6, 3–6
Loss	18.	1907	Kent Championships	Grass	(New Zealand) Anthony Wilding	7–9, 2–6, 6–3, 6–0, 1–6
Loss	19.	1907	Wimbledon Championships	Grass	(Australia) Norman Brookes	4–6, 2–6, 2–6
Win	40.	1907	Shanklin LTC Championships	Grass	(United Kingdom) Charles Henry Ridding	7–5, 6–2, 6–1
Loss	20.	1907	Kent Coast Championships	Hard	(United Kingdom) Herbert Roper Barrett	4–6 4–6 6–4 7–9
Win	41.	1908	British Covered Court Championships	Wood (i)	(New Zealand) Anthony Wilding	4–6, 8–6, 6–0, 8–6
Win	42.	1908	Olympic Championships	Wood (i)	(United Kingdom) George Caridia	6–3, 7–5, 6–4
Loss	21.	1908	Surrey Championships	Grass	(United Kingdom) Major Ritchie	3–6, 4–6, 2–6
Win	43.	1908	Northern Championships	Grass	(Republic of Ireland) James Cecil Parke	6–3, 4–6, 6–1, 6–8, 6–4
Win	44.	1908	Wimbledon Championships	Grass	(United Kingdom) Herbert Roper Barrett	6–3, 6–2, 4–6, 3–6, 6–4
Loss	22.	1909	British Covered Court Championships	Hard (i)	(United Kingdom) Major Ritchie	5–7, 6–8, 3–6
Win	45.	1909	Wimbledon Championships	Grass	(United Kingdom) Major Ritchie	6–8, 1–6, 6–2, 6–2, 6–2
Loss	23.	1910	Wimbledon Championships	Grass	(New Zealand) Anthony Wilding	4–6, 5–7, 6–4, 2–6
Win	46.	1910	Nottinghamshire Championships	Grass	?	?
Win	47.	1911	Leicestershire Championships	Grass	(United Kingdom) Rodney Heath	6–4, 6–1
Loss	24.	1912	Wimbledon Championships	Grass	(New Zealand) Anthony Wilding	4–6, 4–6, 6–4, 4–6
Win	48.	1912	Nottinghamshire Championships	Grass	(United Kingdom) Charles P. Dixon	1–6, 11–9, 6–3
Loss	25.	1912	Kent Coast Championships	Hard	(United Kingdom) Theodore Mavrogordato	7–9, 6–8. ret.
Win	49.	1913	Leicestershire Championships	Grass	(United Kingdom) George Hillyard	7–5, 4–6, ret.
Loss	26.	1913	Nottinghamshire Championships	Grass	(Australia) Stanley Doust	6–3, 3–6, 3-36, 9–7, 4–6
Win	50.	1914	Nottinghamshire Championships	Grass	(United Kingdom) Charles P. Dixon	6–2, 4–6, 4–6, 6–4, 6–4
Win	51.	1919	Leicestershire Championships	Grass	(United Kingdom) George Fletcher	6–2, 6–2, 6–4

== See also ==
- Gore–Wilding rivalry
