= Horace Chapman (tennis) =

British tennis player

- Full name: Horace Arthur Bruce Chapman
- Country (sports): United Kingdom
- Born: 22 September 1866; Roehampton, Middlesex, England
- Died: 23 March 1937 (aged 71); Fulham, London, England
- Turned pro: 1881 (amateur tour)
- Retired: 1906

Singles
- Career record: 114-71 (61.62%)
- Career titles: 7

Grand Slam singles results
- Wimbledon: SF (1892)

Horace Arthur Bruce Chapman (22 September 1866 – 23 March 1937) was a British tennis player. In major tournaments of the late 19th century he was a singles semi finalist at the Wimbledon Championships in 1892, and Irish Championships in 1896, and an All-Comers finalist at the Northern Championships in 1894. He was active from 1881 to 1906 and contested 26 career singles finals, and won 7 titles. His career matches win loss record was 114-71 (61.62%).

== Career ==
Horace was born in Roehampton, Middlesex, England in 1866. He was one of the early British players to win international events. He played his first tournament in 1881, at the County Kildare Closed Tournament in Ireland.

As a player, he reached his peak in the 1890s. At Wimbledon, he lost in the quarterfinals in 1891 to Harold Mahony and in the semifinals in 1892 to Ernest Lewis.

He won his first title in 1889, at the Sussex Championships in Brighton. Chapman won his last title in 189,9 at the Boulogne International Championship, Boulogne-sur-Mer, France, on clay. He played his final event in 1906, at the Hampshire Championships.

== Career Finals (26) ==
=== Tiles (7) ===
- 1889 - Sussex Championships
- 1890 - Dinard Cup
- 1891 - Bournemouth Open
- 1892 - Bournemouth Open (2)
- 1894 - Kent Championships
- 1895 - Bournemouth Open (3)
- 1899 - Boulogne International Championship

=== Runner-Up (19) ===
- 1889 - Bournemouth Open
- 1890 - Middlesex Championships
- 1890 - Sussex Championships
- 1891 - Teignmouth Open
- 1891 - London Covered Court Championships
- 1891 - Exmouth Open
- 1891 - Dinard Cup
- 1891 - Kent Championships
- 1892 - Surrey Championships
- 1892 - Kent Championships
- 1893 - Middlesex Championships
- 1893 - London Covered Court Championships
- 1894 - Teignmouth Open
- 1894 - Northern Championships (all comers)
- 1895 - West Sussex Challenge Cup
- 1895 - Dinard Cup
- 1895 - Kent Championships
- 1896 - Bournemouth Open
- 1900 - Boulogne International Championship
