= 1908 Wimbledon Championships =

- Date: 22 June – 3 July
- Edition: 32nd
- Category: Grand Slam
- Surface: Grass
- Location: Worple Road; SW19, Wimbledon, London, United Kingdom
- Venue: All England Lawn Tennis and Croquet Club

Champions

Men's singles
- (United Kingdom of Great Britain and Ireland) Arthur Gore

Women's singles
- (United Kingdom of Great Britain and Ireland) Charlotte Sterry

Men's doubles
- (United Kingdom of Great Britain and Ireland) Major Ritchie / (New Zealand) Anthony Wilding
- Wimbledon Championships

The 1908 Wimbledon Championships took place on the outdoor grass courts at the All England Lawn Tennis and Croquet Club in Wimbledon, London, United Kingdom. The tournament ran from 22 June until 3 July. It was the 32nd staging of the Wimbledon Championships, and the first Grand Slam tennis event of 1908.

== Champions ==
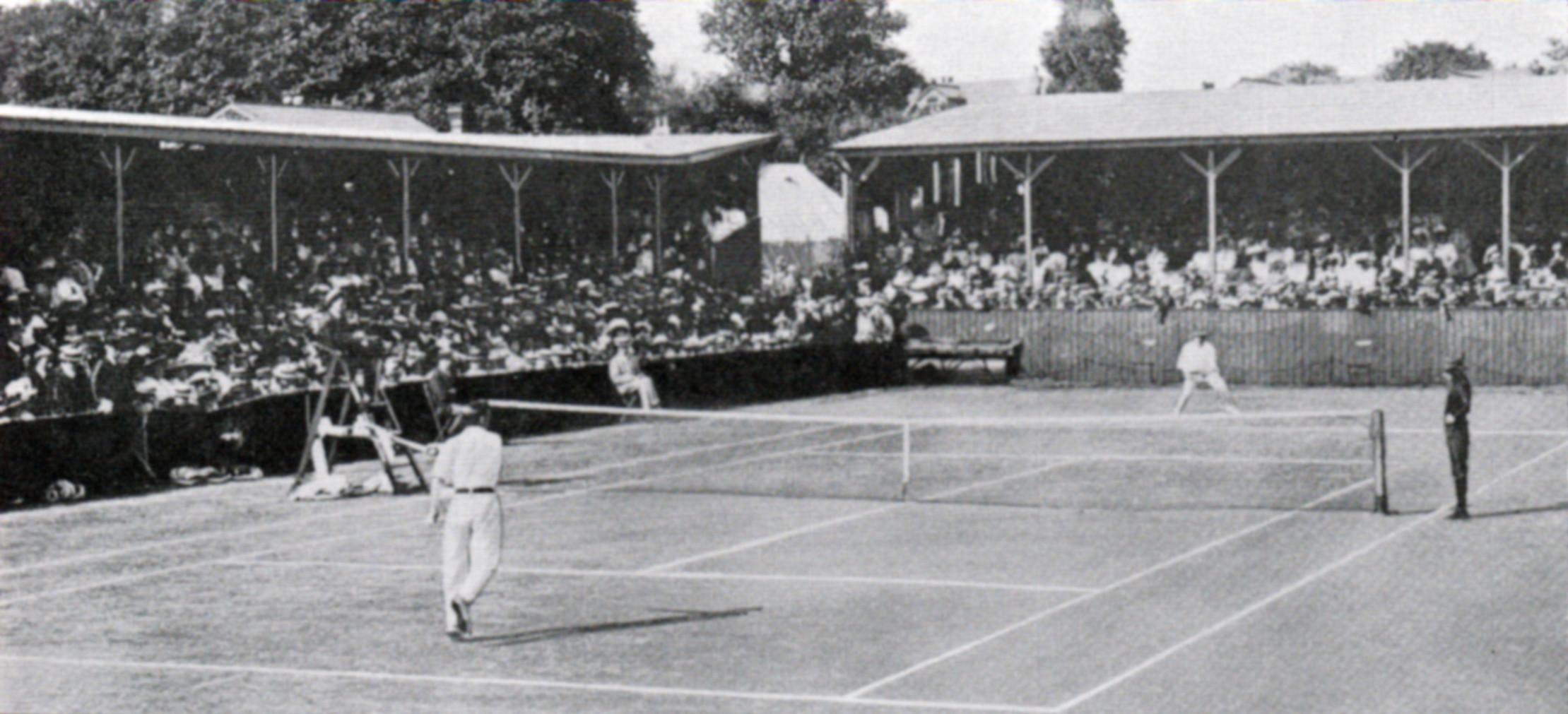
Wimbledon final 1908, Gore vs Barret

=== Men's singles ===
(United Kingdom of Great Britain and Ireland) Arthur Gore defeated (United Kingdom of Great Britain and Ireland) Herbert Roper Barrett 6–3, 6–2, 4–6, 3–6, 6–4

=== Women's singles ===
(United Kingdom of Great Britain and Ireland) Charlotte Sterry defeated (United Kingdom of Great Britain and Ireland) Agnes Morton 6–4, 6–4

=== Men's doubles ===
(United Kingdom of Great Britain and Ireland) Major Ritchie / (New Zealand) Anthony Wilding defeated (United Kingdom of Great Britain and Ireland) Herbert Roper Barrett / (United Kingdom of Great Britain and Ireland) Arthur Gore, 6–1, 6–2, 1–6, 9–7

Preceded by 1907 U.S. National Championships	Grand Slams	Succeeded by 1908 U.S. National Championships
