= Championship of Europe =

Tennis tournament series (1899–1914)

Defunct tennis tournament
- Founded: 1899; 126 years ago
- Abolished: 1914; 111 years ago
- Editions: 15
- Location: Bad Homburg; Dublin; Hythe; Leicester; Liverpool; London; Newcastle; Ostend; Paris; Scarborough; Scheveningen; Stockholm
- Venue: Bad Homburg TC (1899, 1905); Ostend TC (1900); Tennis Club de Paris (1901); Queen's Club (1902, 1908); Leimonias LTC (1903); Royal Lawn TC (1904); Leicester LTC (1906); Fitzwilliam LTC (1906); Northumberland CCC (1909); Liverpool Cricket Club (1910); Hotel Imperial Courts (1912); Yorkshire LTC (1913); Norwood Sports Club (1914)
- Surface: Clay; Grass; Wood

The Championship of Europe was a men's and women's international tennis tournament founded in 1899 in Bad Homburg vor der Höhe, Germany. The tournament was staged in different countries for 15 editions until 1914 when it was discontinued.

== History ==
The Championship of Europe tournament was first played on clay courts at the Bad Homburg Tennis Club, in Bad Homburg vor der Höhe, Germany. The event was staged in different countries and played on multiple surfaces both indoors and outdoors. It was discontinued in 1914 due to World War I.

== Finals ==
=== Men's singles ===
Year	Location	Surface	Champion	Runner up	Score
1899	Bad Homburg	Clay	(United Kingdom of Great Britain and Ireland) Harold Mahony	(United Kingdom of Great Britain and Ireland) Reginald Doherty	w.o.
1900	Ostend	Clay	(United Kingdom of Great Britain and Ireland) Major Ritchie	(United Kingdom of Great Britain and Ireland) Harold Mahony	w.o.
1901	Paris	Wood (i)	(France) Max Decugis	(France) Paul Lebreton	6–4, 6–3, 6–3
1902	London	Wood (i)	(United Kingdom of Great Britain and Ireland) Laurie Doherty	(United Kingdom of Great Britain and Ireland) Harold Mahony	4–6, 6–4, 6–3, 6–1. (Note: The 1902 edition of the men's European Championships was also valid as the London Covered Court Championships.)
1903	Scheveningen	Clay	(United States) Robert LeRoy	(United Kingdom of Great Britain and Ireland) W. Percy Pinckney	4–6, 6–1, 6–1, 6–0
1904	Stockholm	Wood (i)	(United Kingdom of Great Britain and Ireland) Major Ritchie (2)	(France) Max Decugis	7–5, 6–2, 6–4
1905	Bad Homburg	Clay	(New Zealand) Anthony Wilding	(United Kingdom of Great Britain and Ireland) George Hillyard	5–7, 7–5, 2–6, 6–3, 7–5
1906	Leicester	Grass	(United Kingdom of Great Britain and Ireland) Frank Riseley	(United Kingdom of Great Britain and Ireland) George Ball-Greene	4–6, 6–1, 5–1, ret.
1907	Dublin	Grass	(United Kingdom of Great Britain and Ireland) James Cecil Parke	(United Kingdom of Great Britain and Ireland) Herbert N. Craig	6–1, 6–2, 6–2
1908	London	Grass	(United Kingdom of Great Britain and Ireland) Major Ritchie (3)	(United Kingdom of Great Britain and Ireland) Walter Crawley	10–8, 6–8, 2–3, ret.
1909	Newcastle	Grass	(United Kingdom of Great Britain and Ireland) Major Ritchie (4)	(United Kingdom of Great Britain and Ireland) Sydney Adams	3–6, 6–3, 6–0, 6–0
1910	Liverpool	Grass	(United States) Beals Wright	(United Kingdom of Great Britain and Ireland) S.Ernest Charlton	6–1, 6–4, 6–4
1912 (Note: The 1912 edition of the men's European Championships held in Hythe was also valid as the Kent Coast Championships.)	Hythe	Grass	(United Kingdom of Great Britain and Ireland) Algernon Kingscote	?	?
1913	Scarborough	Grass	(United Kingdom of Great Britain and Ireland) James Cecil Parke	(United Kingdom of Great Britain and Ireland) F. Gordon Lowe	6–2, 7–5, 6–1
1914	Norwood	Grass	(United Kingdom of Great Britain and Ireland) F. Gordon Lowe	(United Kingdom of Great Britain and Ireland) Alfred Beamish	6–4, 6–1, 6–3

=== Women's singles ===
Year	Location	Surface	Champion	Runner up	Score
1912 (Note: The 1912 edition of the women's European Championships held in Hythe also valid as the Kent Coast Championships.)	Hythe	Grass	(United Kingdom of Great Britain and Ireland) Winifred McNair	(United States) Elizabeth Ryan	3–6, 6–1, 6–3
1914 (Note: The 1914 edition of the women's European Championships held in Norwood was also valid as the Norwood Park Open Championships.)	Norwood	Grass	(United Kingdom of Great Britain and Ireland) Doris Covell Craddock	(United Kingdom of Great Britain and Ireland) Madeline O'Neill	6–4, 7–5
