= London Covered Court Championships =

Defunct tennis tournament
- Tour: LTA (1890–1912); ILTF (1913–46)
- Founded: 1890
- Abolished: 1946
- Location: West Kensington; London; England
- Venue: Queen's Club
- Surface: Wood / indoor

The London Covered Court Championships was a combined indoor wood court tennis tournament founded in 1890, and played on indoor courts at the Queen's Club, West Kensington, London, England until 1946.

== History ==
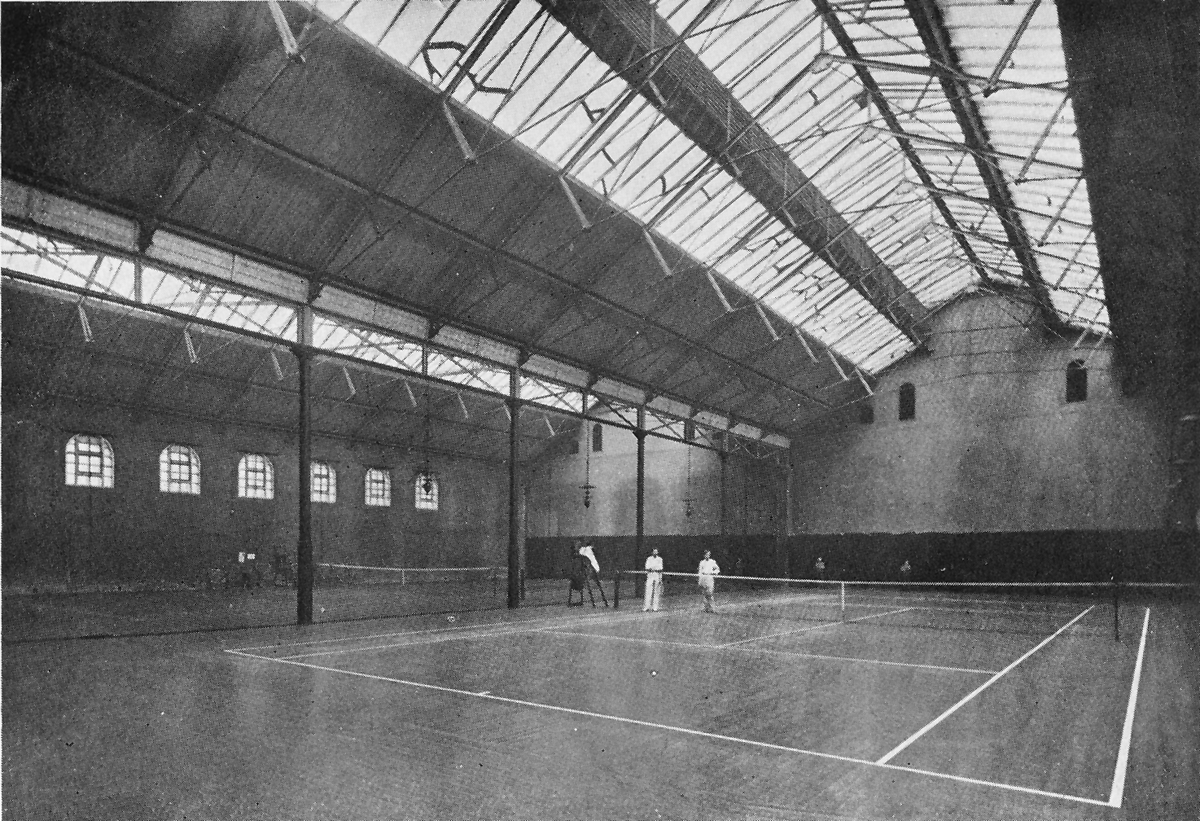
Indoors court at the Queen's club, England, before 1903

The tournament was founded on 10 March 1890, and the winner of the first men's singles title was Harry Sibthorpe Barlow who defeated Ernest Meers in the final. This tournament was usually played in the first quarter of the year usually end of February to March until the mid 1890s when it was discontinued.

In the early 1900s the event was revived and moved in the calendar to the autumn, usually October. In 1902 the tournament was co valid as the Championship of Europe. The women's event did not begin until 1905, won by Dorothea Douglass defeating Ethel Thomson Larcombe in the final.

In the early 1920s - contrary to some sources - this event was not merged into the British Covered Court Championships, instead the scheduling for that event was switched to the autumn, this tournament was moved back to the spring, taking place annually in March or April.

The event ran until 1939 when it was suspended due to World War II; the final women's event was played that year, won by Phyllis Mudford King who beat Betty Batt in the final. The men's event resumed in 1946 for one last edition only, won by Sweden's Lennart Bergelin (later coach of Bjorn Borg).

== Finals ==
=== Men's singles ===
(incomplete roll)

Year	Champion	Runner up	Score
1890	(United Kingdom) Harry S. Barlow	(United Kingdom) Ernest Meers	2-6, 4-6, 6-0, 6-4, 6-3
1891	(United Kingdom) Harry S. Barlow (2)	(United Kingdom) Horace Chapman	3-6, 8-6, 6-8, 6-3, 6-1
1893	(Ireland) Harold Mahony	(United Kingdom) Horace Chapman	6-2, 0-6, 6-1
1894	(Ireland) Harold Mahony (2)	(United Kingdom) Guy Pilkington	6-4, 8-10, 6-2
1902	(United Kingdom of Great Britain and Ireland) Laurie Doherty	(United Kingdom of Great Britain and Ireland) Harold Mahony	4–6, 6–4, 6–3, 6–1. (Note: The 1902 edition of the men's London CC Championships was also valid as the Championship of Europe)
1903	(United Kingdom) Arthur Gore	(United Kingdom) Major Ritchie	8-6, 1-6, 7-5, 6-4
1904	(France) Max Decugis	(United Kingdom) Arthur Gore	6-2, 3-6, 0-6, 6-1, 6-4
1905	(United Kingdom) Arthur Gore (2)	(United Kingdom) Major Ritchie	6-3, 6-4, 5-7, 6-4
1906	(New Zealand) Anthony Wilding	(United Kingdom) George Caridia	6-3, 6-0, 6-1
1907	(France) Max Decugis (2)	(United Kingdom) Major Ritchie	6-2, 6-4, 6-2
1908	(United Kingdom) Ken Powell	(United Kingdom) Major Ritchie	6-4, 2-6, 6-2, 6-2
1909	(United Kingdom) Major Ritchie	(United Kingdom) Gordon Lowe	6-4, 6-0, 6-0
1910	(New Zealand) Anthony Wilding (2)	(United Kingdom) Arthur Lowe	6-2, 6-1, 6-3
1911	(United Kingdom) Major Ritchie (2)	(United Kingdom) George Caridia	7-5, 7-5, 6-4
1912	(United Kingdom) Theodore Mavrogordato	(Romania) Nicolae Mishu	6-4, 4-6, 6-4, 6-1
1913	(New Zealand) Anthony Wilding (3)	(United Kingdom) Arthur Lowe	7-5, 6-0, 6-2
1919	(United Kingdom) Theodore Mavrogordato (2)	(Romania) Nicolae Mishu	6-1, 5-7, 6-3, 6-2
1920	(United Kingdom) Gordon Lowe	(India) Mohammed Sleem	6-4, 6-4, 7-5
1921	(India) Mohammed Sleem	(United Kingdom) Walter Crawley	6-1, 7-9, 6-3, 6-1
1922	(United Kingdom) Major Ritchie (3)	(India) Athar Ali Fyzee	6-4, 6-3, 6-4
1923	(United Kingdom) Brian Gilbert	(United Kingdom) Donald Greig	6-1, 6-3, 7-5
1924	(South Africa) Pat Spence	(United Kingdom) Patrick Wheatley	6-2, 6-2, 4-6, 6-4
1925	(India) Sydney Jacob	(South Africa) Pat Spence	3-6, 7-5, 6-0, 3-6, 6-3
1926	(United Kingdom) Noel Turnbull	(United Kingdom) Bunny Austin	7-9, 0-6, 6-3, 6-1, 7-5
1927	(India) Sydney Jacob (2)	(United Kingdom) Gordon Crole-Rees	1-6, 6-3, 7-5, 6-3
1928	(United Kingdom) Nigel Sharpe	(United Kingdom) Teddy Higgs	6-1, 6-3, 2-6, 5-7, 6-3
1929	(United Kingdom) John Olliff	(United Kingdom) Stanley Harris	6-4, 2-6, 6-3, 6-4
1930	(Japan) Yoshiro Ohta	(South Africa) Pat Spence	4-6, 6-2, 6-2, 3-6 7-5
1931	(Japan) Iwao Aoki	(Japan) Ryuki Miki	6-3, 7-5, 6-4
1933	(United Kingdom) Bunny Austin	(United Kingdom) Harry Lee	11-9, 4-6, 7-5.
1934	(United Kingdom) Nigel Sharpe (2)	(United Kingdom) Bob Tinkler	6-2, 4-6, 6-3, 6-2
1935	(Germany) Daniel Prenn	(South Africa) Pat Spence	6-1, 6-3
1936	(United Kingdom) Nigel Sharpe (3)	(Germany) Daniel Prenn	2-6, 6-2, 4-6, 6-0 ret.
1937	(United Kingdom) Ronald Shayes	(United Kingdom) Nigel Sharpe	6-4, 4-6, 6-4, 6-4
1938	(United Kingdom) Nigel Sharpe (4)	(United Kingdom) John Olliff	6-4, 6-4
1939	(United Kingdom) Lawrence Shaffi	(Republic of China (1912–1949)) Choy Wai-Chuen	6-2, 6-4
1946	(Sweden) Lennart Bergelin	(Poland) Ignacy Tloczynski	6-4, 4-6, 6-2, 6-3
