= Kent Championships =

Coordinates: 51.4140°N 0.0219°W

Defunct tennis tournament
- Founded: 1886
- Abolished: 1996
- Location: Beckenham, Kent, England
- Venue: Foxgrove Road
- Surface: Grass / outdoor

The Kent Championships also known as the Kent All-Comers' Championships and later Kent Open was a tennis tournament played on outdoor grass courts in Foxgrove Road, Beckenham, Kent, England between 1886 and 1996 and was held in the first half of June.

== History ==
From 1886 until 1910 the tournament was organized as an All-Comers event, the winner of which would play the title holder from previous year in the Challenge Round. The tournament was played on outdoor grass courts at Beckenham Cricket Club a multi sport club that was established in 1866 in Foxgrove Road, Beckenham with the lawn tennis section of the club established in 1879. At the inaugural edition "The programme consisted of five events, the principal of which were the Kent All-Comers' Championship singles, and the gentlemen's singles handicap. The former designation was adopted so that the event may not be confused with the Kent County Championship, announced to be held at the Blackheath Club. There was only a mixed doubles event staged that year for women to participate in the Beckenham Cricket Club Tournament.

Herbert Chipp, later a Wimbledon umpire, came through a field of 13 entries to capture the inaugural 1886 men's singles title over Beckenham committee member Edward Avory. The Field informed its readers, "The final was a terribly tedious affair. Both players kept at the back of the court and played an excessively careful game." There were 14 pairs in the gentleman's doubles and seven pairs in the mixed doubles. The first event made a loss of £1. 10s. 9d. Two years later, from a field of 11 entries, May Jacks beat Edith Gurney to win the first women's singles tournament.

Slazenger's provided the tournament tennis balls every year from 1902, while the Challenge Round was abolished in 1911 and an Under 21 event, which became a national championship, started in 1921. When the former Soviet Union joined the International Tennis Federation in 1958, a small delegation was invited to Beckenham ahead of The Championships at Wimbledon.

The Kent Championships were the first UK tournament to have a sponsor, Rothmans, in 1963, after a special dispensation from the Lawn Tennis Association, the governing body of British tennis. Almost five years later in March 1968 at a Special General Meeting in Paris, Beckenham was awarded the status of an Open event. The club welcomed amateur and professional players to compete in the world's first Open grass-court tournament in June 1968. It was the third Open field in 1968 after the British Hard Court Championships in Bournemouth and the French Open at Roland Garros.

When a sponsor couldn't be found for the tournament after 1996, the event was consigned to tennis history. In total, 33 'double' winners (those who won the singles title at Beckenham and Wimbledon) had etched their names in Beckenham folklore.

== Champions ==
=== Men's singles ===
Source:Beckenham Lawn Tennis Club, Kent Championships

| Year | Champions | Runners-up | Score |
|---|---|---|---|
| 1886 | (United Kingdom) Herbert Chipp | (United Kingdom) Edward J. Avory | 6–4, 3–6, 6–3, 2–6, 6–3 |
| 1887 | (United Kingdom) Frederick A. Bowlby | (United Kingdom) Herbert Chipp | 1–6, 8–6, 6–4, 6–1 |
| 1888 | (United Kingdom) Ernest G. Meers | (United Kingdom) Frederick A. Bowlby | 5–7, 3–6, 9–7, 6–3, 6–2 |
| 1889 | (United Kingdom) Harry S. Barlow | (United Kingdom) Ernest G. Meers | 6–4, 1–6, 6–2, 9–7 |
| 1890 | (United Kingdom) Ernest G. Meers | (United Kingdom) Harry S. Barlow | 5–7, 8–6, 6–3, 6–3 |
| 1891 | (United Kingdom) Ernest G. Meers | (United Kingdom) Arthur Gore | 6–0, 6–2, 6–2 |
| 1892 | (United Kingdom) Harry S. Barlow | (United Kingdom) Ernest G. Meers | 4–6, 2–6, 8–6, 6–2, 6–3 |
| 1893 | (United Kingdom) Harry S. Barlow | (United Kingdom) William Renshaw | 2–6, 6–3, 6–1, 6–4 |
| 1894 | (United Kingdom) Horace A. B. Chapman | (United Kingdom) Harry S. Barlow | 3–6, 3–6, 6–3, 6–4, 6–3 |
| 1895 | (United Kingdom) Harry S. Barlow | (United Kingdom) Horace A. B. Chapman | 2–6, 6–3, 6–3, 4–6, 6–3 |
| 1896 | (United Kingdom) Manliffe Goodbody | (United Kingdom) Harry S. Barlow | 6–1, 6–2, 2–6, 6–0 |
| 1897 | (United Kingdom) George Greville | (United Kingdom) Manliffe Goodbody | 4–6, 6–3, 4–6, 6–4, 6–4 |
| 1898 | (United Kingdom) Wilberforce Eaves | (United Kingdom) George Greville | 6–0, 6–0, 6–1 |
| 1899 | (United Kingdom) Harold Mahony | (United Kingdom) Wilberforce Eaves | 6–1, 6–1, 6–8, 3–6, 8–6 |
| 1900 | (United Kingdom) Arthur Gore | (United Kingdom) Harold Mahony | 6–4, 6–4, 6–4 |
| 1901 | (United Kingdom) Laurence Doherty | (United Kingdom) Arthur Gore | 6–1, 6–3, 3–6, 6–4 |
| 1902 | (United Kingdom) Laurence Doherty | (United Kingdom) George Simond | 6–4, 6–0, 6–3 |
| 1903 | (United Kingdom) Laurence Doherty | (United Kingdom) Arthur Gore | 6–1, 6–2, 6–3 |
| 1904 | (United Kingdom) Harold Mahony | (United Kingdom) Brame Hillyard | 6–3, 8–6, 7–9, 4–6, 6–3 |
| 1905 (Note: Due to rain the final was postponed and played at the All-England Club directly preceding the Wimbledon Championships) | (Australia) Norman Brookes | (United Kingdom) Arthur Gore | 6–3, 9–7, 6–2 |
| 1906 | (United Kingdom) Arthur Gore | (United Kingdom) A.L. Bentley | 6–0, 6–2, 6–1 |
| 1907 | (New Zealand) Anthony Wilding | (United Kingdom) Arthur Gore | 9–7, 6–2, 3–6, 0–6, 6–1 |
| 1908 | (United Kingdom) Herbert Roper Barrett | (United Kingdom) Charles P. Dixon | 6–0, 9–7, 6–2 |
| 1909 | (United Kingdom) Herbert Roper Barrett | (United Kingdom) Major Ritchie | cancelled (rain) |
| 1910 | (United States) Beals Wright | (United Kingdom) Herbert Roper Barrett | 4–6, 7–5, 12–10, 6–4 |
| 1911 | (New Zealand) Anthony Wilding | (United Kingdom) Major Ritchie | 6–0, 6–0, 6–3 |
| 1912 | (New Zealand) Anthony Wilding | (United Kingdom) Herbert Roper Barrett | 6–2, 4–6, 6–2, 1–6, 6–2 |
| 1913 | (United Kingdom) Alfred Beamish | (United Kingdom) George Thomas | 6–3, 6–3, 3–6, 7–5 |
| 1914 | (United Kingdom) Algernon Kingscote | (United Kingdom) Hope Crisp | 7–5, 2–6, 3–6, 6–2, 6–2 |
| 1915 | No competition (due to World War I) | | |
| 1916 | No competition (due to World War I) | | |
| 1917 | No competition (due to World War I) | | |
| 1918 | No competition (due to World War I) | | |
| 1919 | (United Kingdom) Algernon Kingscote | (New Zealand) F.M.B. Fisher | 4–6, 6–4, 9–7, 3–6, 6–2 |
| 1920 | (United Kingdom) Algernon Kingscote | (Japan) Zenzo Shimidzu | 7–5, 3–2 ret. |
| 1921 | (United Kingdom) Algernon Kingscote | (India) Sydney M. Jacob | 6–4, 4–6, 6–0, 6–3 |
| 1922 | (United Kingdom) Algernon Kingscote | (Australia) Randolph Lycett | 6–3, 3–1 ret. |
| 1923 | (United States) William M. Johnston | (United Kingdom) Donald Greig | 6–2, 6–3 |
| 1924 | (United Kingdom) Algernon Kingscote | (United Kingdom) Jack Hillyard | 8–6, 9–7, 6–2 |
| 1925 | (United Kingdom) Randolph Lycett | (United Kingdom) Harry Lewis-Barclay | 6–3, 6–1, 5–7, 6–4 |
| 1926 | (United Kingdom) Gordon Crole Rees | (South Africa) Patrick Spence | 6–4, 6–2 |
| 1927 | (United Kingdom) Donald Greig | (United Kingdom) Charles Kingsley | 4–6, 6–2, 6–3 |
| 1928 | (United Kingdom) Charles Kingsley | (South Africa) Patrick Spence | 2–6, 6–4, 8–6 |
| 1929 | (United Kingdom) Harry Lee | (United Kingdom) Charles Kingsley | 7–5, 6–4, 6–2 |
| 1930 | (United Kingdom) Bunny Austin | (United Kingdom) Harry Lee | 6–2, 2–6, 6–4, 6–2 |
| 1931 | (United Kingdom) Colin Gregory | (United Kingdom) John Olliff | 3–6, 6–3, 7–9, 6–3, 6–0 |
| 1932 | (United Kingdom) Ted Avory | (New Zealand) Buster Andrews | 6–1, 6–4 |
| 1933 | (South Africa) Vernon Kirby | (South Africa) Colin Robbins | 8–6, 6–4 |
| 1934 | (United Kingdom) Bunny Austin | (Japan) Jiro Yamagishi | 6–3, 6–0 |
| 1935 | (Japan) Jiro Yamagishi | (United Kingdom) Ian Collins | 6–3, 6–1 |
| 1936 | (United States) David N. Jones | (United Kingdom) Frank Wilde | 11–9, 6–3 |
| 1937 | (Japan) Jiro Yamagishi | (United Kingdom) Raymond Tuckey | 8–6, 1–6, 7–5 |
| 1938 | (United Kingdom) John Olliff | (United Kingdom) Nigel Sharpe | 6–2, 6–3 |
| 1939 | (United Kingdom) Murray Deloford | (United Kingdom) Donald MacPhail | 3–6, 6–2, 9–7 |
| 1940 | No competition (due to World War II) | | |
| 1941 | No competition (due to World War II) | | |
| 1942 | No competition (due to World War II) | | |
| 1943 | No competition (due to World War II) | | |
| 1944 | No competition (due to World War II) | | |
| 1945 | No competition (due to World War II) | | |
| 1946 | (Australia) Geoffrey Browne | (Netherlands) Hans van Swol | 6–1, 6–4 |
| 1947 | (Australia) Bill Sidwell | (Sweden) Torsten Johansson | 6–2, 10–8 |
| 1948 | (Australia) Frank Sedgman | (Australia) Jack Harper | 6–4, 6–4 |
| 1949 | (United States) Gardnar Mulloy | (United States) Earl Cochell | 2–3 ret. |
| 1950 | (Australia) Geoffrey Browne | (Australia) Bill Sidwell | 8–6, 7–9, 17–15 |
| 1951 | (United States) Don Candy | (United States) Gardnar Mulloy | 3–6, 6–4, 6–2 |
| 1952 | (United States) Ham Richardson | (Australia) Don Candy | 6–2, 6–8, 6–2 |
| 1953 | (United States) Ham Richardson | (United States) Gardnar Mulloy | 6–4, 4–6, 6–3 |
| 1954 | Competition cancelled at quarterfinal stage | | |
| 1955 | (Australia) Tony Trabert | (United States) Herb Flam | 6–4, 6–2 |
| 1956 | (Australia) Mal Anderson | (United States) Sammy Giammalva | cancelled |
| 1957 | (Australia) Mal Anderson | (United States) Herb Flam | 6–2, 4–6, 8–6 |
| 1958 | (Australia) Neale Fraser | (Denmark) Kurt Nielsen | 6–4, 6–4 |
| 1959 | (United States) Alex Olmedo | (Denmark) Kurt Nielsen | 8–6, 3–6, 6–4 |
| 1960 | (Australia) Robert Mark | (United States) Butch Buchholz | 6–3, 6–4 |
| 1961 | (United States) Jon Douglas | (New Zealand) Lew Gerrard | 4–6, 6–3, 6–3 |
| 1962 | (Australia) Barry Phillips-Moore | (Australia) Owen Davidson | 6–4, 8–6 |
| 1963 | (Australia) Ken Fletcher | (Australia) Marty Mulligan | 6–3, 6–2 |
| 1964 | (Australia) John Newcombe | (Australia) Fred Stolle | 6–2, 5–7, 12–10 |
| 1965 | (Australia) John Newcombe | (New Zealand) Lew Gerrard | 6–3, 6–1 |
| 1966 | (Australia) John Newcombe | (India) Premjit Lall | 6–4, 15–13 |
| 1967 | (Australia) Owen Davidson | (Australia) Ken Fletcher | 3–6, 6–2, 6–3 |
Open era
| 1968 (Note: Tournament was part of the 1968 Rothmans tennis circuit which consisted of four grass court tournaments (Surrey, Northern, Kent, London) in preparation of the Wimbledon Championships) | (Australia) Fred Stolle | (Australia) Roy Emerson | 6–3, 6–1 |
| 1969 | (Sweden) Ove Bengtson | (United States) Tom Gorman | 6–4, 7–5 |
| 1970 | (United States) Clark Graebner | (South Africa) Robert Maud | 6–4, 10–8 |
| 1971 | (United States) Stan Smith | (India) Premjit Lall | 7–9, 6–4, 6–2 |
| 1972 | (Soviet Union) Alex Metreveli | (India) Vijay Amritraj | 6–2, 7–5 |
| 1973 | (Soviet Union) Alex Metreveli | (Sweden) Björn Borg | 6–3, 9–8 |
| 1974 | (India) Vijay Amritraj | (United States) Tom Gorman | 6–7, 6–2, 6–4 |
| 1975 | (United States) Arthur Ashe | (United States) Roscoe Tanner | 7–5, 6–4 |
| 1976 | (United States) Roscoe Tanner | (United States) Jimmy Connors | 6–3, 6–4 |
| 1977 | (Australia) Mark Edmondson | (United States) Tim Gullikson | 6–3, 6–4 |
| 1978 | (United States) Jimmy Connors | (United States) Stan Smith | 9–8, 6–3 |
| 1979 | (United States) Peter Fleming | (United States) Roscoe Tanner | 3–6, 6–3, 7–5 |
| 1980 | (New Zealand) Onny Parun | (United States) Sandy Mayer | 6–4, 4–6, 9–7 |
| 1981 | (South Africa) Kevin Curren | (New Zealand) Chris Lewis | 6–2, 6–3 |
| 1982 | (South Africa) Kevin Curren | (United Kingdom) Buster Mottram | 7–6, 6–4 |
| 1983 | (United States) Steve Denton | (Australia) Pat Cash | 7–6, 7–6 |
| 1984 | (Australia) Pat Cash | (Australia) Paul McNamee | 3–6, 6–2, 6–1 |
| 1985 | (United States) Tim Mayotte | (South Africa) Danie Visser | 7–5, 6–1 |
| 1986 | (India) Ramesh Krishnan | (South Africa) Danie Visser | 6–3, 6–7, 6–3 |
| 1987 | (United States) Scott Davis | (United States) Leif Shiras | 7–6, 6–3 |
| 1988 | (Germany) Christian Saceanu | (Australia) Paul McNamee | 3–6, 6–2, 6–1 |
| 1989 | (United States) John McEnroe | (Australia) Broderick Dyke | 6–4, 7–6 |
| 1990 | (Czechoslovakia) Ivan Lendl | (Australia) Darren Cahill | 6–3, 7–5 |
| 1991 | (Czechoslovakia) Ivan Lendl | (Australia) Pat Cash | 3–6, 7–6^{(7–3)}, 7–6^{(7–4)} |
| 1992 | (United States) David Wheaton | (South Africa) Christo van Rensburg | 6–3, 1–6, 6–1 |
| 1993 | (United States) David Wheaton | (United Kingdom) Chris Bailey | 6–4, 3–6, 7–6^{(7–2)} |
| 1994 | (France) Guy Forget | (United Kingdom) Jeremy Bates | 6–2, 6–3 |
| 1995 | (United Kingdom) Andrew Richardson / (Czech Republic) Petr Korda | | divided (rain) |
| 1996 | (United Kingdom) Mark Petchey | (Czech Republic) Petr Korda | 6–2, 6–4 |

=== Women's singles ===
Source:Beckenham Lawn Tennis Club, Kent Championships

| Year | Champions | Runners-up | Score |
|---|---|---|---|
| 1888 | (United Kingdom) May Jacks | (United Kingdom) Edith Gurney | 1–6, 6–3, 6–0 |
| 1889 | (United Kingdom) Maud Shackle | (United Kingdom) May Jacks | 6–3, 7–5 |
| 1890 | (United Kingdom) May Jacks | (United Kingdom) Maud Shackle | 4–6, 6–0, 6–4 |
| 1891 | (United Kingdom) Maud Shackle | (United Kingdom) May Jacks | 6–4, 6–0 |
| 1892 | (United Kingdom) Maud Shackle | (United Kingdom) May Jacks | 6–3, 6–1 |
| 1893 | (United Kingdom) Maud Shackle | (United Kingdom) Ruth Legh | 6–3, 6–4 |
| 1894 | (United Kingdom) Edith Austin | (United Kingdom) Amy Wilson | 6–4, 6–2 |
| 1895 | (United Kingdom) Edith Austin | (United Kingdom) Amy Wilson | 6–3, 6–1 |
| 1896 | (United Kingdom) Edith Austin | (United Kingdom) Ruth Legh | 6–4, 2–6, 6–4 |
| 1897 | (United Kingdom) Edith Austin | (United Kingdom) Miss E. R. Morgan | 6–2, 6–0 |
| 1898 | (United Kingdom) Charlotte Cooper | (United Kingdom) Edith Austin | 6–2, 4–6, 6–3 |
| 1899 | (United Kingdom) Edith Austin | (United Kingdom) Charlotte Cooper | 1–6, 7–5, 6–2 |
| 1900 | (United Kingdom) Edith Greville | (United Kingdom) Muriel Robb | 6–1, 6–3 |
| 1901 | (United Kingdom) Dorothea Douglass | (United Kingdom) Edith Greville | 6–1, 4–6, 6–4 |
| 1902 | (United Kingdom) Dorothea Douglass | (United Kingdom) Hilda Lane | 7–5, 6–4 |
| 1903 | (United Kingdom) Connie Wilson | (United Kingdom) Dorothea Douglass | 3–6, 6–4, 6–4 |
| 1904 | (United Kingdom) Dorothea Douglass | (United Kingdom) Connie Wilson | 6–2, 6–2 |
| 1905 | (United Kingdom) Connie Wilson | (United Kingdom) Alice Greene | 6–2, 6–4 |
| 1906 | (United Kingdom) Dorothea Douglass | (United Kingdom) Connie Wilson | 6–3, 2–2 ret. |
| 1907 | (United States) May Sutton | (United Kingdom) Dorothea Douglass | 6–2, 6–4 |
| 1908 | (United Kingdom) Agnes Morton | (United Kingdom) Dora Boothby | 6–2, 6–1 |
| 1909 | (United Kingdom) Dora Boothby | (United Kingdom) Agnes Morton | 6–4, 6–4 |
| 1910 | (United Kingdom) Dorothea Douglass | (United Kingdom) Dora Boothby | 6–4, 6–3 |
| 1911 | (United Kingdom) Dorothea Douglass | (United Kingdom) Mildred Coles | 6–3, 7–5 |
| 1912 | (United Kingdom) Winifred McNair | (United Kingdom) Dora Boothby | 6–1, 6–4 |
| 1913 | (United Kingdom) Dorothea Douglass | (United Kingdom) Phyllis Satterthwaite | 6–4, 6–4 |
| 1914 | (United Kingdom) Edith Hannam | (United Kingdom) Agnes Morton | 0–6, 11–9 ret. |
| 1915 | No competition (due to World War I) | | |
| 1916 | No competition (due to World War I) | | |
| 1917 | No competition (due to World War I) | | |
| 1918 | No competition (due to World War I) | | |
| 1919 | (United States) Elizabeth Ryan | (United Kingdom) Dorothea Douglass | 2–6, 7–5, 6–4 |
| 1920 | (United States) Elizabeth Ryan | (United Kingdom) Winifred McNair | 7–9, 3–2 divided |
| 1921 | (United States) Elizabeth Ryan | (United Kingdom) Geraldine Beamish | 9–7, 6–4 |
| 1922 | (United Kingdom) Kitty McKane | (United States) Elizabeth Ryan | 6–3, 6–3 |
| 1923 | (United States) Elizabeth Ryan | (United Kingdom) Phyllis Satterthwaite | 6–3, 3–6, 6–3 |
| 1924 | (United States) Elizabeth Ryan | (United Kingdom) Kitty McKane | 6–8, 6–1, 6–1 |
| 1925 | (United States) Elizabeth Ryan | (United Kingdom) Geraldine Beamish | 4–6, 6–3, 6–2 |
| 1926 | (Spain) Lilí Álvarez | (United States) Molla Mallory | 6–4, 6–2 |
| 1927 | (United States) Helen Wills | (United Kingdom) Kitty McKane Godfree | 6–2, 6–4 |
| 1928 | (United States) Elizabeth Ryan | (United Kingdom) Violet Chamberlain | 6–2, 10–8 |
| 1929 | (United Kingdom) Phyllis Howkins Covell | (United Kingdom) Peggy Saunders Mitchell | 6–1, 6–4 |
| 1930 | (India) Jenny Sandison | (United Kingdom) Ann Owen | 6–2, 4–6, 6–4 |
| 1931 | (United States) Phyllis Mudford | (United Kingdom) Dorothy Round | 6–1, 6–2 |
| 1932 | (United Kingdom) Mary Heeley | (United Kingdom) Freda James | 1–6, 6–3, 6–0 |
| 1933 | (United Kingdom) Dorothy Round | (United Kingdom) Peggy Saunders Mitchell | 7–5, 6–2 |
| 1934 | (United Kingdom) Phyllis Mudford King | (Australia) Joan Hartigan | 6–2, 6–3 |
| 1935 | (United Kingdom) Dorothy Round | (United Kingdom) Kay Stammers | 6–2, 6–0 |
| 1936 | (Chile) Anita Lizana | (United Kingdom) Betty Nuthall | 3–6, 6–0, 6–1 |
| 1937 | (Poland) Jadwiga Jędrzejowska | (United States) Alice Marble | 6–1, 9–11, 6–1 |
| 1938 | (Poland) Jadwiga Jędrzejowska | (South Africa) Bobbie Heine Miller | 7–5, 3–6, 6–2 |
| 1939 | (United States) Alice Marble | (United Kingdom) Kay Stammers | 6–3, 6–1 |
| 1940 | No competition (due to World War II) | | |
| 1941 | No competition (due to World War II) | | |
| 1942 | No competition (due to World War II) | | |
| 1943 | No competition (due to World War II) | | |
| 1944 | No competition (due to World War II) | | |
| 1945 | No competition (due to World War II) | | |
| 1946 | (United Kingdom) Vera Dace | (United Kingdom) Betty Nuthall | 6–4, 6–4 |
| 1947 | (United Kingdom) Kay Menzies | (South Africa) Sheila Piercey Summers | 6–2, 11–9 |
| 1948 | (Argentina) Mary Terán de Weiss | (United Kingdom) Patsy Rodgers | 7–5, 6–1 |
| 1949 | (United States) Patricia Todd | (South Africa) Sheila Piercey Summers | 6–3, 6–0 |
| 1950 | (United States) Gussie Moran | (United States) Nancy Morrison | 4–6, 6–1, 6–2 |
| 1951 | (United States) Betty Rosenquest | (United States) Barbara Scofield | 4–6, 7–5, 6–1 |
| 1952 | (South Africa) Hazel Redick-Smith | (United Kingdom) Vera Thomas | 6–2, 6–2 |
| 1953 | (United States) Maureen Connolly | (United States) Julia Sampson Hayward | 6–2, 6–3 |
| 1954 | Abandoned | | |
| 1955 | (United States) Louise Brough | (Australia) Mary Carter | 6–2, 6–4 |
| 1956 | (United States) Darlene Hard | (United States) Betty Rosenquest Pratt | Abandoned (rain) |
| 1957 | (United States) Althea Gibson | (United States) Darlene Hard | 6–3, 3–6, 6–4 |
| 1958 | (South Africa) Sandra Reynolds | (South Africa) Jean Forbes | 6–4, 6–4 |
| 1959 | (United States) Darlene Hard | (United States) Sally Moore | 6–1, 7–5 |
| 1960 | (Belgium) Christiane Mercelis | (United Kingdom) Vera Roberts | 7–5, 4–6, 6–4 |
| 1961 | (Australia) Margaret Smith | (United Kingdom) Christine Truman | 6–3, 4–6, 8–6 |
| 1962 | (Australia) Jan Lehane | (Australia) Lesley Turner | 7–5, 6–3 |
| 1963 | (Australia) Margaret Smith | (Australia) Jan Lehane | 6–0, 6–1 |
| 1964 | (Brazil) Maria Bueno | (Australia) Margaret Smith | 3–5 divided (rain) |
| 1965 | (Australia) Margaret Smith | (Brazil) Maria Bueno | 4–6, 6–3, 6–3 |
| 1966 | (Australia) Karen Krantzcke | (Brazil) Maria Bueno | w.o. |
| 1967 | (United Kingdom) Ann Haydon-Jones | (United Kingdom) Virginia Wade | 6–3, 1–6, 6–3 |
Open era
| 1968 | (Australia) Margaret Court | (United Kingdom) Ann Jones | 11–9, 6–2 |
| 1969 | (United States) Denise Carter-Triolo | (Australia) Kerry Melville | 6–3, 7–5 |
| 1970 | (United States) Patti Hogan | (Soviet Union) Olga Morozova | 6–1, 6–3 |
| 1971 | (Australia) Kerry Melville | (United States) Kristy Pigeon | 6–0, 3–6, 9–7 |
| 1972 | (Soviet Union) Olga Morozova | (United Kingdom) Jill Cooper | 6–4, 6–1 |
| 1973 | (Australia) Dianne Fromholtz | (United States) Janet Newberry | 7–5, 0–6, 6–1 |
| 1974 | (Israel) Paulina Peisachov | (United States) Kate Latham | 5–7, 6–3, 6–4 |
| 1975 | (South Africa) Greer Stevens | (United States) Patti Hogan | 4–6, 6–3, 6–3 |
| 1976 | (Soviet Union) Olga Morozova | (South Africa) Marise Kruger | 7–5, 2–6, 6–3 |
| 1977 | (South Africa) Yvonne Vermaak | (United Kingdom) Michelle Tyler | 6–4, 5–7, 6–1 |
| 1978 | (Australia) Evonne Cawley | (United States) Laura DuPont | 6–4, 6–2 |
| 1979 | (Australia) Evonne Cawley | (United States) Pam Shriver | 6–3, 6–2 |
| 1980 | (United States) Andrea Jaeger | (United Kingdom) Jo Durie | 6–4, 6–1 |
| 1981 | (United States) Pam Shriver | (Australia) Elizabeth Little | 6–2, 6–2 |
| 1982 | (United States) Pam Shriver | (Australia) Elizabeth Sayers | 6–3, 6–2 |
| 1983 | (United States) Billie Jean King | (United States) Barbara Potter | 6–4, 6–3 |
