= North London Hard Courts Championships =

Defunct tennis tournament
- Tour: ILTF
- Founded: 1920; 106 years ago
- Abolished: 1930; 96 years ago
- Location: Highbury & Stamford Hill, London, England
- Venue: North London Hard Courts Tennis Club & Gipsy Lawn Tennis Club
- Surface: Clay- outdoors

The North London Hard Courts Championships was a combined men's and women's clay court tennis tournament founded in 1920. The tournament was jointly held at the Gipsy Lawn Tennis Club, Stamford Hill, and the North London Hard Courts Tennis Club, Highbury London, England It ran until 1939.

== History ==
The North London Hard Courts Championships were established in 1920. The championships were usually held in September each year. However there were two events of the women's championships in 1922 and 1923: the first in May, and the second in September. The tournament was jointly held at the Gipsy Lawn Tennis Club, Stamford Hill and North London Hard Courts Tennis Club, Highbury London, England. It ran until 193 when it was abolished.

Notable winners of the men's singles title included: Athar Ali Fyzee, Nicolae Mishu, Antoine Gentien, Major Ritchie, Pat Spence, René Lacoste, Gordon Lowe, and Henry Mayes. Winners of the women's singles championship included: Ermyntrude Harvey, Dorothy Holman, Helen Wills-Moody, Lili de Alvarez and Sylvie Jung Henrotin.

== Venues ==
The Gipsy Lawn Tennis Club was founded in 1920 at Stamford Hill, London. It consisted of seven hard (clay) and twelve grass courts. The club also staged the North London Grass Courts Championships. The North London Hard Courts Lawn Tennis Club at Sotheby Road, Highbury, was the other venue used for this event.

== Additional notes ==
Newspaper sources list the tournament as being held in Highbury, however Mullock's Specialist Auctioneers & Valuers of London state on their website that the tournament was staged continuously at the Gipsy Lawn Tennis Club Stamford Hill.

== See also ==
- North London Championships
