= North London Championships =

Defunct tennis tournament
- Tour: ILTF
- Founded: 1894; 132 years ago
- Abolished: 1930; 96 years ago
- Location: Stamford Hill, London, England
- Venue: Gipsy Lawn Tennis Club
- Surface: Grass- outdoors

The North London Championships also known as the Gipsy Championships or simply Gipsy was a combined men's and women's grass court tennis tournament founded as the Gipsy Lawn Tennis Tournament in 1894. The tournament was held at the Gipsy Lawn Tennis Club, Stamford Hill, London, England until 1930.

== History ==
The North London Championships were established in 1894. The tournament was staged at the Gipsy Lawn Tennis Club, continuously until 1915, it was discontinued because of World War I. The tournament then resumed in 1919 and continued through till 1930 when it was abolished.

Notable winners of the men's singles title included; Arthur Gore, Herbert Roper Barrett, Harold Segerson Mahony, Major Ritchie, Theodore Michel Mavrogordato, Zenzo Shimidzu, Gordon Lowe, and Henry Mayes. Winners of the women's singles championship included; Blanche Hillyard, Edith Austin, Dorothea Douglass, Hilda Lane, Agnes Morton, Dorothy Holman, Geraldine Ramsey Beamish, Molla Bjurstedt Mallory, Helen Wills, Elizabeth Ryan and Helen Jacobs.

== See also ==
- North London Hard Courts Championships
