= Crystal Palace Open =

Defunct tennis tournament
- Founded: 1881; 144 years ago
- Abolished: 1909; 116 years ago
- Location: Crystal Palace, London, England
- Venue: Crystal Palace Park Cricket Ground
- Surface: Grass

The Crystal Palace Open was a men's and women's grass court tennis tournament founded in 1881. The tournament was organised annually by the Crystal Palace Lawn Tennis Club, and was played on the Crystal Palace Park Cricket Ground at Crystal Palace, London, England. The tournament ran until 1909 when it was discontinued.

== History ==
In 1881 the Crystal Palace Open was established. The event was orgnaised by Crystal Palace Lawn Tennis Club, and was played on the Crystal Palace Park Cricket Ground at Crystal Palace, London, England. The tournament ran until 1909 when it was discontinued.

Previous winners of the men's singles title included; Harold Segerson Mahony, Major Ritchie, Arthur Gore and Reginald Speke Barnes. Former winners of the women's singles included; Aurea Farrington, Dora Boothby, Helen Aitchison, and Elsie Lane.

== Finals ==
=== Men's singles ===
(incomplete roll)

Year	Winners	Runners-up	Score
1904	(Ireland) Harold Mahony	(United Kingdom of Great Britain and Ireland) Ernest Parton	6-3, 6-2
1905	(United Kingdom of Great Britain and Ireland) Arthur Gore	(New Zealand) Anthony Wilding	6-4, 6-2
1906	(United Kingdom of Great Britain and Ireland) Arthur Gore (2)	(United Kingdom of Great Britain and Ireland) George Thomas	6-1, 6-2
1907	(United Kingdom of Great Britain and Ireland) Major Ritchie	(United Kingdom of Great Britain and Ireland) Algernon Kingscote	6-1, 6-4
1909	(United Kingdom of Great Britain and Ireland) Reginald S. Barnes	(United Kingdom of Great Britain and Ireland) Charles P. Dixon	6-2, 3-6, 6-3

=== Women's singles ===
(incomplete roll)

Year	Winners	Runners-up	Score
1904	(United Kingdom of Great Britain and Ireland) Dora Boothby	(United Kingdom of Great Britain and Ireland) Gladys Eastlake-Smith	6-1, 6-2
1905	(United Kingdom of Great Britain and Ireland) Dora Boothby (2)	(United Kingdom of Great Britain and Ireland) Helen Harper	6-3, 6-4
1906	(United Kingdom of Great Britain and Ireland) Gladys Eastlake-Smith	(United Kingdom of Great Britain and Ireland) Dora Boothby	walkover
1907	(United Kingdom of Great Britain and Ireland) Dora Boothby (3)	(United Kingdom of Great Britain and Ireland) Gladys Eastlake-Smith	6-0, 7-5
1909	(United Kingdom of Great Britain and Ireland) Aurea Edgington	(United Kingdom of Great Britain and Ireland) E Sargeant	6-4, 6-1

== Additional notes ==
- The Rothmans Invitation Indoor was an indoor tennis tournament also held in Crystal Palace, London between 1967 and 1968, in 1969 it was rebranded as the Rothmans European Trophy.
