= Sussex Championships =

Defunct tennis tournament
- Tour: LTA Circuit (1889-1912); ILTF World Circuit (1913-1968); ILTF Independent Circuit (1970-1980)
- Founded: 1889
- Abolished: 1980
- Editions: 78
- Location: Brighton, East Sussex, England (1889-1926); West Worthing, West Sussex, England (1972-1980)
- Surface: Grass

The Sussex Championships or Sussex County Championships was a men's and women's grass court tennis tournament that were first staged in 1889. By 1972 it was known as the Sussex Tennis Open Championships. The championships were first held in Brighton, East Sussex, England then moved to West Worthing, West Sussex, England and ran only until 1980.

The tournament is no longer a senior level international tour event, but is still staged today as a closed county tournament to British players only.

== History ==
A Sussex County Lawn Tennis Tournament was a brief tennis tournament consisting of a spring tournament usually held in April and another held in autumn usually September. It was originally played on outdoor asphalt courts at Brighton and Hove Rink, England with the exception of the 1884 event that was played on grass courts. In 1882 the organisers staged the spring event. also played on asphalt courts, but for only two editions. there was just four editions of this event but did feature two future Wimbledon Men's singles champions the Renshaw twins it ran until 1885 then was abolished. In 1889 the event was revived as a grass court tournament called the Sussex Championships that was held at Hove County Cricket Ground.

The Sussex Championships was a very successful tournament in the years up to World War I, and was the second largest of the South of England meetings. The September tournament (otherwise called the Autumn Tournament), even when held in August, just before the South of England Championships was the main draw event on the Sussex calendar for many years. In 1911 it became a two-week competition. Many of the leading players of the day took part in the championships. Following the First World War for some unknown reason, the event failed to gain the longevity it needed to keep the success going, unlike the South of England tournament, rescheduling of the event may have been the cause of its early demise.

Following the start of the open era the Sussex Championships were revived, but this time played at a new location in West Worthing. By 1972 it was known as the Sussex Tennis Open Championships. The championships continued as a two-week tournament until 1978. The tournament continued up to 1980 when it was abolished for the final time as a senior tour level event. It was a featured county level event on the Mens Amateur Tour (1877-1912), the Women Amateur Tour (1877-1912), the ILTF Mens Amateur Tour (1913-1967) and the ILTF Women's Amateur Tour (1913-1967).

== Finals ==
=== Men's singles ===
Incomplete Roll:

Year	Champions	Runners-up	Score
Sussex Championships (Brighton)
1889	(England) Horace Chapman	(United Kingdom) Wilberforce Eaves	6-3, 6–3, 8–6.
1890	(England) Wilfred Baddeley	(England) Horace Chapman	6-4, 6–2, 2–6, 7–5.
1891	(Ireland) Grainger Chaytor	(England) Wilfred Baddeley	w.o.
1892	(United Kingdom) Wilberforce Eaves	(Ireland) Grainger Chaytor	w.o.
1893	(England) Wilfred Baddeley (2)	(United Kingdom) Wilberforce Eaves	6-1, 1–6, 8–6, 6-2
1894	(England) Wilfred Baddeley (3)	(England) Harry Sibthorpe Barlow	6-1, 6–0, 2–6, 7-5
1895	(Ireland) Grainger Chaytor (2)	(England) Wilfred Baddeley	w.o.
1896	(England) Wilfred Baddeley (4)	(Ireland) Grainger Chaytor	w.o.
1897	(Ireland) George Ball-Greene	(England) Wilfred Baddeley	w.o.
1898	(Ireland) Grainger Chaytor (3)	(Ireland) George Ball-Greene	6-1, 6–1, 2–6, 8-6
1899	(United Kingdom) Sydney Howard Smith	(Ireland) Grainger Chaytor	6-4, 6–3, 6-2
1900	(United Kingdom) Sydney Howard Smith (2)	(United Kingdom) George Whiteside Hillyard	6-2, 4–6, 6–4, 6-2
1901	(United Kingdom) Sydney Howard Smith (3)	(Ireland) Joshua Pim	6-1, 6–3, 5–7, 6-2
1902	(United Kingdom) Sydney Howard Smith (4)	(United Kingdom) Frank Riseley	5-7, 6–4, 2–6, 6-4 ret.
1903	(United States) Robert Leroy	(United States) Wylie Grant	8-6, 6–1, 1–6, 1–6, 6-2
1904	(United Kingdom) Sydney Howard Smith (5)	(United Kingdom) Frank Riseley	6-4. 5–7. 3-3 ret.
1905	(United Kingdom) Sydney Howard Smith (6)	(United Kingdom) Frank Riseley	w.o.
1906	(United Kingdom) Arthur Gore	(United Kingdom) Major Josiah Ritchie	6-2, 6–3, 6-3
1907	(United Kingdom) George Whiteside Hillyard	(United Kingdom) Alfred Bentley	6-3, 1–6, 6-4
1908	(United Kingdom) Walter Cecil Crawley	(United Kingdom) John Frederick Stokes	6-2, 6–2, 6-3
1909	(Canada) Robert Branks Powell	(United Kingdom) William Alfred Ingram	6-2, 6-2
1910	(United Kingdom) James Zimmermann	(United Kingdom) Walter Cecil Crawley	w.o.
1914/1919	Not held (due to world war one)		
1920	(United Kingdom) Alfred Beamish	(United Kingdom) Monty Temple	3-6, 6-4, 6-2, 6-1
1921	(India) Mohammed Sleem	(India) Cotah Ramaswami	6-4, 6-3, 6-0
1922	(United Kingdom) F. R. Leighton Crawford	(United Kingdom) Charles Tuckey	6-0, 6-1
1924	(United Kingdom) Jack Hillyard	(United Kingdom) F. R. Leighton Crawford	1-6, 6-4, 6-1, 7-5
↓ Open era ↓
1970	(United Kingdom) Max Franklin	(India) Jay Royappa	9-7, 6-2
Sussex Tennis Open Championships (West Worthing)
1977	(United Kingdom) Clive Rothwell	(United Kingdom) Jasper Cooper	6-4, 6-2
1978	(United Kingdom) Willie Davies	(United Kingdom) Tony Lloyd	7-5, 6-4
1979	(United Kingdom) Chris Wells	Robert Booth	6-1, 6-0

=== Women's singles ===
Incomplete Roll:

Year	Champions	Runners-up	Score
Sussex Championships (Brighton)
1889	(Ireland) May Langrishe	(Ireland) Beatrice Langrishe	6-3, 6-3, 8-6
1890	(Ireland) May Langrishe (2)	(England) Maud Shackle	6-4, 6-2, 2-6, 7-5
1891	(England) Maud Shackle	(Ireland) May Langrishe	6-4, 5-7, 6-2
1892	(England) Maud Shackle (2)	(United Kingdom) Bertha Steedman	6-0, 8-6
1893	(United Kingdom) Blanche Bingley Hillyard	(United Kingdom) Maud Shackle	6-1, 6-4
1894	(United Kingdom) Blanche Bingley Hillyard (2)	(England) Maud Shackle	6-3, 6-0
1895	(United Kingdom) Blanche Bingley Hillyard (3)	(United Kingdom) Helen Jackson	6-2, 6-2
1896	(United Kingdom) Blanche Bingley Hillyard (4)	(United Kingdom) Charlotte Cooper	3-6, 6-4, 6-1
1897	(United Kingdom) Charlotte Cooper	(United Kingdom) Blanche Bingley Hillyard	7-5, 7-5
1898	(United Kingdom) Edith Austin	(United Kingdom) Charlotte Cooper	6-3, 6-2
1899	(United Kingdom) Charlotte Cooper (2)	(United Kingdom) Edith Austin	6-4, 6-4
1900	(United Kingdom) Blanche Bingley Hillyard (5)	(United Kingdom) Hilda Lane	6-3, 6-3
1901	(United Kingdom) Charlotte Cooper Sterry (3)	(United Kingdom) Blanche Bingley Hillyard	6-4, 6-2
1902	(United Kingdom) Charlotte Cooper Sterry (4)	(United Kingdom) Dorothea Douglass	6-2, 6-8, 6-3
1903	(United Kingdom) Alice Greene	(United Kingdom) Dorothea Douglass	2-6, 8-6, 6-2
1904	(United Kingdom) Dorothea Douglass	(United Kingdom) Charlotte Cooper Sterry	6-3, 6-3
1905	(United Kingdom) Winifred Longhurst	(United Kingdom) Connie Wilson	divided the prizes
1906	(United Kingdom) Charlotte Cooper Sterry (5)	(United Kingdom) Violet Pinckney	6-0, 6-0
1907	(United Kingdom) Charlotte Cooper Sterry (6)	(United Kingdom) Ruth Winch	6-0, 6-1
1908	(United Kingdom) Charlotte Cooper Sterry (7)	(United Kingdom) Edith Boucher	9-7, 6-4
1909	(United Kingdom) Dora Boothby	(England) Hilda Lane	6-1, 6-2
1910	(United Kingdom) Ethel Thomson Larcombe	(United Kingdom) Dora Boothby	9-7. 6-4
1911	(United Kingdom) Dora Boothby	(United Kingdom) Agnes Daniell Tuckey	4-6, 6-3, 6-4
1912	(United Kingdom) Dora Boothby (2)	(United Kingdom) Annie Wix Cobb	6-4, 6-2
1913	(United Kingdom) Dora Boothby (3)	(United Kingdom) Minnie Dillon	6-2, 4-6, 6-4
1914/1919	Not held (due to world war one)		
1920	(United States) Elizabeth Ryan	(United Kingdom) Dorothy Holman	6-2, 2-6 6-2
1921	(United Kingdom) Dorothy Holman	(United Kingdom) Louise Bull	8-6, 6-2
1922	(United Kingdom) Dorothy Holman (2)	(United Kingdom) Agnes Daniell Tuckey	w.o.
1923	(United States) Elizabeth Ryan (2)	(United Kingdom) Christine Tyrrell	6-2, 6-0
1924	(United Kingdom) Dorothy Holman (3)	(United Kingdom) Phoebe Holcroft	6-4, 3–6, 6-3
1925	(United Kingdom) Phoebe Holcroft Watson	(United Kingdom) Joyce Brown	6-2, 6-1
1926	(United Kingdom) Phoebe Holcroft Watson (2)	(United Kingdom) Joyce Brown	6-1, 6-1
↓ Open era ↓
1970	(United Kingdom) Jenny Chamberlain	(United Kingdom) H.B. Chamberlain	6-2, 6-3
Sussex Tennis Open Championships (West Worthing)
1977	(United Kingdom) Annette Coe	(United Kingdom) Debra Parker	6-4, 6-4
1978	(United Kingdom) Debra Stewart	(United Kingdom) Annette Coe	2-6, 6–2, 6-1
1979	(United Kingdom) Michele Tyler	(United Kingdom) Lesley Charles	1-6, 6–2, 7-5
1980	(United Kingdom) Lesley Charles	(United Kingdom) Elizabeth Jones	6-4, 6-2

== See also ==
- West Sussex Championships

== Sources ==
- Lewis, Ralph Henry (1972). Scene in Sussex: a fresh look at the county,. London: Research Pub. ISBN 9780705000154.
- Myers, Arthur Wallis (1903). Lawn Tennis at Home and Abroad. London: Scribner's sons.
- Nieuwland, Alex. "Tournament – Sussex Championships". www.tennisarchives.com. Netherlands: Tennis Archives.
- Sussex County Championships Archives. Tennis Sussex. Tennis Sussex. Retrieved 6 October 2022.
- Teague, Bryan (20 November 2016). "History of the Club". sussexcountycroquetclub.org.uk. Sussex County Croquet Club.
