= Harold Mahony =

British tennis player

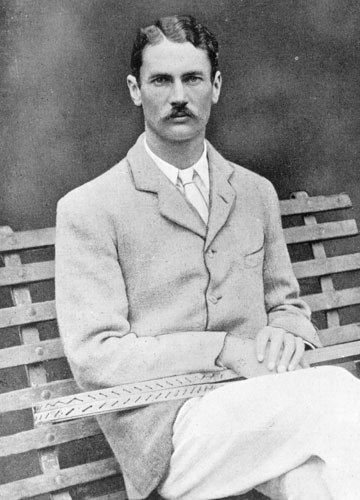
- Full name: Harold Segerson Mahony
- Country (sports): (Republic of Ireland) Ireland
- Born: 13 February 1867 Edinburgh, Scotland, UK
- Died: 27 June 1905 (aged 38) County Kerry, Ireland
- Height: 1.91 m (6 ft 3 in)
- Turned pro: 1890 (amateur tour)
- Retired: 1905 (death)

Singles
- Career titles: 43

Grand Slam singles results
- Wimbledon: W (1896)
- US Open: 4R (1903)

Grand Slam doubles results
- Wimbledon: F (1892, 1903)
- US Open: F (1897)
Medal record
Representing Great Britain
| Silver medal – second place | 1900 Paris | Singles |
| Bronze medal – third place | 1900 Paris | Doubles |
Representing a Mixed team
| Silver medal – second place | 1900 Paris | Mixed doubles |

Harold Segerson Mahony (13 February 1867 – 27 June 1905) was a Scottish-born Irish tennis player who is best known for winning the singles title at the Wimbledon Championships in 1896. His career lasted from 1888 until his death in 1905. Mahony was born in Scotland but lived in Ireland for the majority of his life; his family were Irish including both of his parents, the family home was in County Kerry, Southwestern Ireland. He was the last Scottish born man to win Wimbledon until the victory of Andy Murray at the 2013 championships. He remains the most recent Irish singles champion at the All England Club.

== Career ==
Mahony was born either at 21 Charlotte Square, Edinburgh or at Dromore Castle, in County Kerry, Ireland to Richard John Mahony, an Irish barrister and prominent landowner. The family had a home in Scotland but spent most of their time at Dromore Castle, in County Kerry, Ireland. Harold trained on a specially built tennis court at Dromore.

Mahony made his Wimbledon debut in 1890 exiting in the first round. He reached the semifinal in 1891 and 1892. Mahony spent some time in America in the mid-1890s, before returning to the United Kingdom and finally taking the Wimbledon crown in 1896. In the final he beat Wilfred Baddeley of Great Britain in five sets. Under the challenger system Mahony was entitled to defend the Wimbledon title in 1897 but this time he was beaten in the Challenge Round in three straight sets by Reginald Doherty. He was the last Scottish-born player to win a grand slam until Andy Murray won the US Open in 2012 and win Wimbledon until Murray won it in 2013. He was recognised as the third and last Irishman to win the Wimbledon singles.

He won the singles title at the British Covered Court Championships, played at the Queen's Club in London, in 1893 and successfully defended his title the following year. In 1895 Mahony forfeited the defence of his title due to illness. In 1898 he won the singles titles at the prestigious Irish Championships. That same year Mahony, who was a regular competitor in Germany and spoke fluent German, also won the singles title at the German Championships.

At the 1900 Summer Olympics in Paris he won a silver medal in the men's singles event and a bronze medal in the doubles competition (for Great Britain and Ireland), as well as a silver medal in the mixed doubles event with Hélène Prévost from France. Mahony won the Kent Championships in 1899, defeating Wilberforce Eaves in the final, and in 1904, defeating Brame Hillyard in the final.

Mahony was a member of the 1903 British Isles Davis Cup team that won against the United States at the Longwood Cricket Club in Boston but did not play in the event. When four-time Wimbledon champion Reginald Doherty had a shoulder injury the British team captain William Collins elected to forfeit his first match, instead of letting Mahony play, so that Doherty would be allowed to play the reverse singles match later in the event.

Mahony was 1.91m (6 ft 3in) tall and possessed a formidable backhand. His forehand was less notable: his fellow player, George Hillyard, wrote that he "never did acquire the right method of hitting the ball on the forehand".

Mahony was killed on 27 June 1905, aged 38, in a bicycling accident while descending a steep hill near Caragh Lake in County Kerry.

== Grand Slam finals ==
=== Singles ===
| Result | Year | Championship | Surface | Opponent | Score |
|---|---|---|---|---|---|
| Win | 1896 | Wimbledon | Grass | (United Kingdom of Great Britain and Ireland) Wilfred Baddeley | 6–2, 6–8, 5–7, 8–6, 6–3 |
| Loss | 1897 | Wimbledon | Grass | (United Kingdom of Great Britain and Ireland) Reginald Doherty | 4–6, 4–6, 3–6 |

=== Doubles ===
| Result | Year | Championship | Surface | Partner | Opponents | Score |
|---|---|---|---|---|---|---|
| Loss | 1897 | U.S. Championships | Grass | (United Kingdom of Great Britain and Ireland) Harold Nisbet | (United States) George Sheldon (United States) Leo Ware | 13–11, 2–6, 7–9, 6–1, 1–6 |

== Olympic finals ==
=== Singles: 1 (1 silver medal) ===
| Result | Year | Olympics | Surface | Opponent | Score |
|---|---|---|---|---|---|
| Silver | 1900 | Paris | Clay | (United Kingdom) Laurence Doherty | 4–6, 2–6, 3–6 |

=== Mixed Doubles: 1 (1 silver medal) ===
| Result | Year | Olympics | Surface | Partner | Opponents | Score |
|---|---|---|---|---|---|---|
| Silver | 1900 | Paris | Clay | (France) Yvonne Prévost | (United Kingdom) Charlotte Cooper (United Kingdom) Reginald Doherty | 2–6, 4–6 |

== Challenge Rounds ==
Challenge Round: the final round of a tournament, in which the winner of a single-elimination phase (final) faces the previous year's champion, who plays only that one match. The challenge round was used in the early history of tennis (from 1877 through 1921), in some tournaments not all. (**) denotes challenge round

== Career finals ==
=== Singles 86 (43 titles, 43 runner-ups) ===
Legend (43–43)
Win
Loss

| No. | Result | Date | Tournament | Surface | Opponent | Score |
|---|---|---|---|---|---|---|
| 1. | Loss | May 1888 | Fitzwilliam Club Championships | Grass | (Ireland) Tom Campion | 9–7, 7–5, 5–7, 6–0 |
| 2. | Loss | Jun 1889 | Northern Championships | Grass | (Ireland) Willoughby Hamilton | 6–3, 3–6, 6–1, 6–2 |
| 3. | Win | Jun 1889 | Dublin University LT Championships | Hard | (Ireland) Hume R. Jones | 9–7, 7–5, 5–7, 6–0 |
| 4. | Loss | May 1890 | Dublin University LT Championships | Hard | (Ireland) Grainger Chaytor | 6–3, 3–6, 8–6, 6–1 |
| 5. | Win | Jun 1890 | East Gloucestershire Championships | Grass | (United Kingdom) James Baldwin | 6–4, 1–6, 6–1, 6–4 |
| 6. | Loss | Jul 1890 | Middlesex Championships | Grass | (England) Ernest Lewis | 6–1, 6–4, 6–2 |
| 7. | Loss | Aug 1890 | South Saxons Open Tournament | Grass | (Ireland) Joshua Pim | 3–6, 6–1, 6–4, 6–4 |
| 8. | Loss | Jun 1891 | Welsh Championships | Grass | (United Kingdom) Harry S. Barlow | 5–7, 6–2, 7–5, 0–6, 6–1 |
| 9. | Loss | Jul 1891 | Queens Challenge Cup | Grass | (Ireland) Joshua Pim | 2–6, 6–1, 6–2, 6–3 |
| 10. | Loss | Jul 1891 | Warwickshire Championships | Grass | (Ireland) Joshua Pim | 8–10, 6–2, 6–3, 6–2 |
| 11. | Win | Jul 1891 | Leicestershire Championships | Grass | (Ireland) Joshua Pim | 7–5, 6–2, 2–6, 4–6, 6–4 |
| 12. | Win | Aug 1891 | Northumberland Championships | Grass | (Ireland) Tom Chaytor | 6–2, 6–4, 6–3 |
| 13. | Loss | Apr 1892 | British Covered Court Championships | Hard (i) | (United Kingdom) Ernest George Meers | 6–2, 6–4, 6–3 |
| 14. | Win | Jul 1892 | Leicestershire Championships | Grass | (Ireland) Joshua Pim | 6–1, 6–2, 6–1 |
| 15. | Loss | Jul 1892 | Northumberland Championships | Grass | (Ireland) Tom Chaytor | 6–0, 10–8, 6–2 |
| 14. | Win | Apr 1893 | British Covered Court Championships | Hard (i) | (United Kingdom) Ernest George Meers | 6–2, 6–2, 6–4 |
| 15. | Win | Jue 1893 | Middlesex Championships | Grass | (United Kingdom) Ernest Lewis | w.o |
| 16. | Win | Apr 1893 | Queens Covered Court Championship | Hard (i) | (United Kingdom) Horace Chapman | 6–0, 2–6, 6–1 |
| 17. | Win | Apr 1893 | British Covered Court Championships | Hard (i) | (England) Ernest George Meers | 6–2, 6–2, 6–4 |
| 18. | Win | Jun 1893 | Middlesex Championships | Grass | (United Kingdom) Horace Chapman | 6–3, 6–4, 6–4 |
| 19. | Loss | Jun 1893 | Northern Championships | Grass | (Ireland) Joshua Pim | 4–6, 6–3, 7–5, 6–2 |
| 20. | Loss | Jun 1893 | Yorkshire Championships | Grass | (Ireland) Joshua Pim | 3–6, 6–2, 6–3, 8–6 |
| 21. | Loss | Jul 1893 | Championship of London | Grass | (Ireland) Joshua Pim | 9–7, 1–6, 6–1, 6–8, 6–3 |
| 22. | Loss | Jul 1893 | Wimbledon Championships | Grass | (Ireland) Joshua Pim | 9–7, 6–3, 6–0 |
| 23. | Win | Aug 1893 | Darlington Open Tournament | Grass | (Ireland) David Chaytor | w.o |
| 24. | Win | Apr 1894 | Queens Covered Court Championship | Hard (i) | (Ireland) Guy Brabazon Pilkington | 6–4, 8–10, 6–2 |
| 25. | Win | Apr 1894 | British Covered Court Championships | Hard (i) | (United Kingdom) Ernest George Meers | 6–4, 8–10, 6–2 |
| 26. | Loss | May 1894 | Irish Championships | Grass | (Ireland) Thomas Chaytor | 6–2, 5–7, 6–3, 2–6, 6–1 |
| 27. | Loss | Jun 1894 | Middlesex Championships | Grass | (United Kingdom) Harry S. Barlow | 3–6, 6–3, 7–5, 6–1 ** |
| 28. | Win | Jun 1894 | Leicestershire Championships | Grass | (England) Edward Roy Allen | w.o. |
| 29. | Win | Jun 1894 | Championship of London | Grass | (Ireland) Joshua Pim | 6–4, 8–10, 6–2 ** |
| 30. | Win | Jun 1894 | Nottinghamshire Championships | Grass | (England) Edward Roy Allen | 8–6, 6–3, 9–7 |
| 31. | Win | Aug 1894 | Northumberland Championships | Grass | (England) Harry Barlow | 6–3, 6–3, 8–6 |
| 32. | Loss | Apr 1895 | British Covered Court Championships | Hard (i) | (England) Edward Roy Allen | w.o. |
| 33. | Loss | Jun 1895 | Irish Championships | Grass | (England) Wilberforce Eaves | 6–3, 6–8, 6–2, 6–4 |
| 34. | Loss | Jun 1895 | Middlesex Championships | Grass | (England) Turketil G. P. Greville | 6–2, 7–5, 6–4 |
| 35. | Loss | Jun 1895 | Neighborhood (u.s.) | Clay | (Ireland) Joshua Pim | 6–4, 6–8, 4–6, 6–4, 6–3 |
| 36. | Loss | Jul 1895 | Warwickshire Championships | Grass | (England) Edward Roy Allen | 6–2, 6–4 |
| 37. | Win | Aug 1895 | Derbyshire Championships | Grass | (Ireland) David Chaytor | 6–2, 3–6, 2–6, 7–5, 6–3 |
| 38. | Loss | Apr 1896 | British Covered Court Championships | Hard (i) | (England) Wilberforce Eaves | 2–6, 6–2, 7–5, 6–3 |
| 39. | Loss | May 1896 | Irish Championships | Grass | (England) Wilfred Baddeley | 6–1, 6–2, 3–6, 6–3 |
| 40. | Win | Jun 1896 | Middlesex Championships | Grass | (United Kingdom) Edwin A. Barlow | 6–2, 7–5, 6–4 ** |
| 41. | Loss | Jun 1896 | Northern Championships | Grass | (England) Wilfred Baddeley | 6–1, 10–12, 7–5, 6–4 ** |
| 42. | Win | Jun 1896 | Championship of London | Grass | (England) Reginald Doherty | 11–9, 6–4, 6–4 |
| 43. | Win | Jul 1896 | West of England Championships | Grass | (United States) William Larned | 6–3, 6–3, 6–3 |
| 44. | Win | Jul 1896 | Wimbledon Championships | Grass | (England) Wilfred Baddeley | 6–2, 6–8, 5–7, 8–6, 6–3 ** |
| 45. | Loss | Apr 1897 | British Covered Court Championships | Hard (i) | (England) Wilberforce Eaves | 6–3, 6–3, 6–0 |
| 46. | Loss | Jul 1897 | Wimbledon Championships | Grass | (England) Reginald Doherty | 6–4, 6–4, 6–3 ** |
| 47. | Win | May 1898 | Irish Championships | Grass | (England) Wilberforce Eaves | 6–1, 5–7, 9–7, 8–6 ** |
| 48. | Win | Jun 1898 | Middlesex Championships | Grass | (England) Turketil G. P. Greville | 4–6, 6–4, 7–5, 6–2 ** |
| 49. | Loss | Jun 1898 | Kent Championships | Grass | (England) Wilberforce Eaves | 6–3, 7–5, 6–3 |
| 50. | Loss | Jun 1898 | Wimbledon Championships | Grass | (England) Laurence Doherty | 6–1, 6–2, 4–6, 2–6, 14–12 |
| 51. | Loss | Jul 1898 | London Championships | Grass | (England) Laurence Doherty | 6–3, 6–4, 9–7 |
| 52. | Win | Jul 1898 | Midland Counties Championships | Grass | (England) Captain Ernest D. Black | 3–6, 6–4, 6–2, 7–5 |
| 53. | Win | Aug 1898 | German International Championships | Clay | (England) George Hillyard | w.o. ** |
| 54. | Loss | Sep 1898 | Sussex Championships | Grass | (Ireland) David Chaytor | 7–5, 0–6, 4–6, 6–2, 6–4 |
| 55. | Win | Sep 1898 | Welsh Covered Court Championships | Hard (i) | (England) Laurence Doherty | 5–7, 6–4, 7–5, 6–4 |
| 56. | Loss | Apr 1899 | British Covered Court Championships | Hard (i) | (England) Wilberforce Eaves | 6–2, 6–4, 6–8, 3–6, 6–4 ** |
| 57. | Loss | May 1899 | Irish Championships | Grass | (England) Reginald Doherty | 6–3, 6–4, 5–7, 6–4 ** |
| 58. | Win | Jun 1899 | Middlesex Championships | Grass | (England) Turketil G. P. Greville | 5–7, 2–6, 6–1, 6–1, 6–4 ** |
| 59. | Win | Jun 1899 | Kent Championships | Grass | (England) Wilberforce Eaves | 6–1, 6–1, 6–8, 3–6, 8–6 ** |
| 60. | Win | Jul 1899 | London Championships | Grass | (England) Arthur Gore | 8–10, 6–2, 7–5, 6–1 |
| 61. | Win | Jul 1899 | Northumberland Championships | Grass | (England) Arthur Gore | 8–6, 6–3 |
| 62. | Win | Aug 1899 | Championship of Europe | Clay | (England) Reginald Doherty | w.o. |
| 63. | Loss | Sep 1899 | South of England Championships | Grass | (England) Sydney Howard Smith | 6–3, 6–3, 6–1 ** |
| 64. | Win | Sep 1899 | Dinard Challenge Cup | Clay | (England) Arthur Gore | 6–4, 6–2, 6–4 |
| 65. | Loss | Apr 1900 | French Covered Court Championships | Hard (i) | (United Kingdom) George Caridia | 3–6, 11–9, 6–3 |
| 66. | Win | Jun 1900 | Middlesex Championships | Grass | (England) Arthur Gore | 6–2, 6–4, 6–2 |
| 67. | Loss | Jun 1900 | Kent Championships | Grass | (England) Arthur Gore | 6–4, 6–4, 6–4 ** |
| 68. | Loss | Jun 1900 | Summer Olympics – Paris | Clay | (England) Laurence Doherty | 6–4, 6–2, 6–3 |
| 69. | Loss | Sep 1900 | Dinard Challenge Cup | Clay | (England) Laurence Doherty | 4–6, 6–1, 8–6, 7–5 |
| 70. | Loss | Jun 1901 | Middlesex Championships | Grass | (England) Turketil G. P. Greville | 7–5, 6–1, 4–6, 6–3 |
| 71. | Loss | Sep 1901 | South of England Championships | Grass | (England) Sydney Howard Smith | 6–3, 7–9, 4–6, 6–4, 1–0. rt. |
| 72. | Loss | Sep 1901 | Portuguese International Championships | Clay | (England) George Hillyard | 6–0, 6–4 |
| 73. | Win | Jun 1902 | Leicestershire Championships | Grass | (England) Laurence Doherty | w.o. |
| 74. | Loss | Jun 1902 | Kent Championships | Grass | (England) George Miéville Simond | 6–4, 6–0, 6–3 ** |
| 75. | Loss | Jun 1902 | Northern Championships | Grass | (England) Sydney Howard Smith | 7–5, 7–5, 3–6, 10–8 |
| 76. | Loss | Oct 1902 | European Championships | Hard (i) | (England) Laurence Doherty | 4–6, 6–4, 6–3, 6–1 |
| 77. | Loss | Apr 1903 | British Covered Court Championships | Hard (i) | (England) George Hillyard | 6–3, 7–9, 6–4, 6–3 |
| 78. | Win | Jun 1903 | Middlesex Championships | Grass | (United Kingdom) Brame Hillyard | 3–6, 6–2, 6–3, 3–6, 6–3 |
| 79. | Win | Jul 1903 | Berkshire Championships | Grass | (United Kingdom) Alfred E. Crawley | 6–3, 8–6 |
| 80. | Win | Jun 1904 | Middlesex Championships | Grass | (United Kingdom) Frederick Payn | 3–6, 6–1, 6–2, 6–4 |
| 81. | Win | Jun 1904 | Kent Championships | Grass | (United Kingdom) Brame Hillyard | 3–6, 6–1, 6–2, 6–4 |
| 82. | Win | Jul 1904 | North London Championships (Gipsy) | Grass | (United Kingdom) Alfred Beamish | 6–1, 5–7, 6–2, 6–1 |
| 83. | Loss | Jul 1904 | Championship of London | Grass | (United Kingdom) Josiah Ritchie | 6–3, 7–9, 6–4, 6–3 |
| 84. | Win | Jul 1904 | Berkshire Championships | Grass | (United Kingdom) Walter Crawley | 5–7, 6–1, 6–4 |
| 85. | Win | Aug 1904 | Crystal Palace Open | Grass | (United Kingdom) Ernest Parton | 6–3, 6–2 |
| 86. | Loss | Jun 1905 | Kent Championships | Grass | (Australia) Norman Brookes | w.o. |
