= Shanklin Open =

Defunct tennis tournament
- Founded: 1880; 146 years ago
- Abolished: 1939; 87 years ago
- Location: Shanklin, Isle of Wight, England
- Surface: Grass/Hard

The Shanklin Open was men's and women's grass and hard court tennis tournament established in 1880 as the Shanklin LTC Tournament. It held Shanklin, Isle of Wight, England and ran through until 1939 when it was abolished.

== History ==
The Shanklin Lawn Tennis Club Tournament was a men's and women's grass court tennis event first staged in 1880. The tournament was staged continuously with the exception of 1915 to 1918 due to World War One, until 1939. In 1932 the edition was held jointly as the Isle of Wight Championships.

Former winners of the men's singles title included; Arthur Gore, George Caridia, Jimmy Van Alen and René de Buzelet. Previous winners of the women's singles included; Gladys Eastlake-Smith, Geraldine Beamish, Phyllis Howkins, Kitty McKane and Elizabeth Ryan.

== Venues ==
The original venue of the early editions of this event were at the cricket grounds of the Shanklin Cricket Club. The Shanklin Lawn Tennis and Croquet Club officially formed in 1883, then staged the tournament at Westhill Road, Shanklin Isle of Wight. In 1911 the club consisted of six grass courts and 3 asphalt courts, and a croquet lawn. This club changed name in the late 1920s to the West Hill Lawn Tennis Club.
