= Anthony Wilding =

New Zealand tennis player

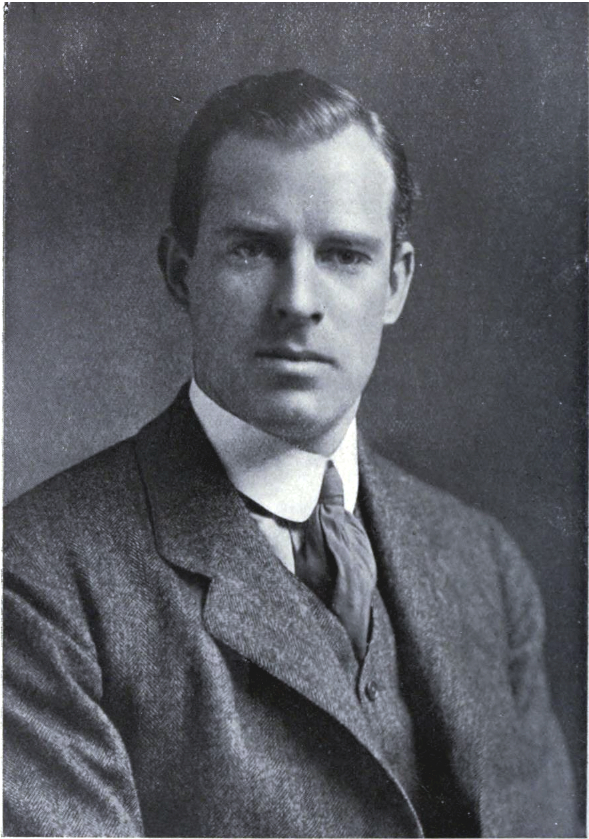
- Anthony Wilding, c. 1912
- Full name: Anthony Frederick Wilding
- Country (sports): New Zealand
- Born: 31 October 1883 Christchurch, New Zealand
- Died: 9 May 1915 (aged 31) Aubers Ridge, Neuve-Chapelle, France
- Height: 1.87 m (6 ft 2 in)
- Plays: Right-handed (one-handed backhand)
- Int. Tennis HoF: 1978 (member page)

Singles
- Career record: 636–57 (91.7%)
- Career titles: 123
- Highest ranking: No. 1 (1911, ITHF)

Grand Slam singles results
- Australian Open: W (1906, 1909)
- Wimbledon: W (1910, 1911, 1912, 1913 (Note: Between 1913 and 1923 Wimbledon was also known as the World Grass Court Championships sanctioned by the ILTF))

Other tournaments
- WHCC: W (1913, 1914)
- WCCC: W (1913)

Doubles

Grand Slam doubles results
- Australian Open: W (1906)
- Wimbledon: W (1907, 1908, 1910, 1914)

Grand Slam mixed doubles results
- Wimbledon: F (1914)

Team competitions
- Davis Cup: W (1907, 1908, 1909, 1914)
Medal record
Tennis
Representing Australasia
Olympic Games
Bronze medal – third place	1912 Stockholm	Indoor singles

Anthony Frederick Wilding (31 October 1883 – 9 May 1915), also known as Tony Wilding, was a New Zealand world No. 1 tennis player and soldier who was killed in action during World War I. Considered the world's first tennis superstar, Wilding was the son of wealthy English immigrants to Christchurch, Canterbury, New Zealand and enjoyed the use of private tennis courts at their home. Wilding obtained a legal education at Trinity College, Cambridge and briefly joined his father's law firm. Wilding was a first-class cricketer and a keen motorcycle enthusiast. His tennis career started with him winning the Canterbury Championships aged 17.

Wilding developed into a leading tennis player in the world during 1909–1914 and is considered to be a former world No. 1. He won 11 Grand Slam tournament titles, six in singles and five in doubles, and is the first and to date the only player from New Zealand to have won a Grand Slam singles title. (Note: Wilding is also the first player from New Zealand to win a Grand Slam doubles title and also the first player from New Zealand to win a Grand Slam title.) In addition to Wimbledon, he also won three other ILTF World Championships (period 1912–1923): In singles, two World Hard Court Championships (WHCC) (1913–14) and one World Covered Court Championships (WCCC) (1913). With his eleven Grand Slam tournaments, two WHCC and one WCCC titles, he has a total of fourteen Major tournament titles (nine singles, five doubles). His sweep of the three ILTF World Championships in 1913 was accomplished on three different surfaces (grass, clay and wood) being the first time this has been achieved in Major tournaments.

Wilding won the Davis Cup four times playing for Australasia, and won a bronze medal at the indoor singles tennis event of the 1912 Olympics, which made him the first and to date only singles player from New Zealand to win a medal in a tennis event in the Summer Olympics and the only New Zealand player to win a medal in any Olympic tennis event until Marcus Daniell and Michael Venus won the bronze medal in the men's doubles competition at the 2020 Summer Olympics in Tokyo in July, 2021. He still holds several all time singles tennis records, namely 23 titles won in a single season (1906) and 114 career outdoor titles (shared with Rod Laver). In his ranking list of greatest tennis players compiled in 1950, Norman Brookes, winner of three Majors and president of the Lawn Tennis Association of Australia, put Wilding in fourth place. Shortly after the outbreak of World War I he enlisted and was killed on 9 May 1915 during the Battle of Aubers Ridge at Neuve-Chapelle, France. In 1978 Wilding was inducted into the International Tennis Hall of Fame.

== Early life ==
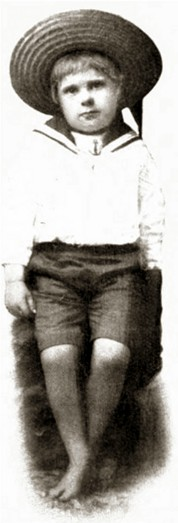
Wilding at four years old

Wilding was the second of five children of Frederick Wilding and Julia Anthony and was named after both parents. Cora Wilding was a younger sister. Wilding's parents emigrated from Herefordshire, England to Christchurch, New Zealand, after their marriage in 1879. His father was a well-to-do lawyer in Christchurch who also played tennis and won several doubles championships of New Zealand. His mother was the daughter of Alderman Charles Anthony, mayor of Hereford. Wilding was born in the suburb of Opawa on 31 October 1883.

At their farmlet, situated on the banks of the Ōpāwaho / Heathcote River to the south of the town in Opawa, they had two tennis courts; one asphalt court for use in the winter and one grass court for summer play. Wilding started playing tennis in 1889, at age six, after receiving a racquet from manufacturer Ralph Slazenger. He was first educated at William Wilson's private school for boys in Cranmer Square, where he was captain of the school football team at age 12. Wilding passed his matriculation in 1901 after failing at his first attempt in 1900. He attended a term at the Canterbury University College for six months prior to departing on his seven-week sea voyage to England in July 1902 where he first stayed at a cramming school at Hunstanton before passing his entrance examination for Trinity College, Cambridge, to study law. There he developed his tennis game as a member of the Cambridge University Lawn Tennis Club. In March 1904, during his second year, he became honorary secretary of the club and managed to popularize the game. He visited the 1903 Wimbledon Championships to see former champion Harold Mahony play. Although Wilding did not excel academically he passed the law examination and graduated B.A. in June 1905 after which he returned to New Zealand to join his father's law practice. Finishing his education, he was called to the English Bar at the Inner Temple in June 1906.

== Tennis career ==
=== British tournaments and Wimbledon debut ===
In October 1901 at the age of 17 Wilding won his first singles title at the Canterbury Championships. In July 1903, during his first summer vacation at Trinity College, Wilding entered his first English public tournament at Sheffield and Hallamshire Championships. He reached the semifinal of the singles event, defeating English top-10 player F.W. Payn in the second round, before losing to G.C. Allen. At the 1903 Brighton tournament he won the mixed doubles partnering Dorothea Douglass, the reigning Wimbledon ladies champion. Wilding worked diligently on improving his backhand during the winter of 1903–04.

He made his first appearance at the Wimbledon Championships in June 1904, defeating Albert Prebble in the first round of the singles event before losing to Harold Mahony in four sets. He was pleased to take a set from the 1896 champion: "To my great delight I captured a set and made Mahony talk to himself a great deal". Shortly afterwards, at the Welsh Championships, he reached his first singles final which he lost in straight sets to S.H. Smith. He won his first title in England at the Championships of Shropshire followed by a win at the Thompson Challenge Cup in Redhill; both relatively new and minor events on the tennis circuit. In August 1904 Wilding won the Scottish Championships in Moffat, defeating C.J. Glenny in the final. At his second Wimbledon appearance he came back from two-sets down to defeat William Clothier in the fourth round but lost in the quarterfinal against the experienced Arthur Gore.

=== Davis Cup debut and first European tour ===
In July 1905 he made his first Davis Cup appearance as part of the Australasia team (Note: Between 1905 and 1914 Australia and New Zealand entered the Davis Cup competition as a combined Australasia team. During this period Wilding was the only New Zealander to play for the team.) in the semifinal against Austria, played at the Queen's Club, London. Australasia won 5–0 and Wilding won both his singles matches but in the final they were defeated 5–0 by the United States and Wilding admitted to have been outclassed in his straight-sets defeats by William Larned and Beals Wright. After two tournament victories at minor events in New Barnet and Redhill Wilding went on his first tour of the European circuit which brought him into contact with the European upper class and aristocracy who frequented these tournaments. In August he won the Pöseldorf Cup in Hamburg followed by a title win at the Championship of Europe in Homburg which were both, as almost all tournaments on the European mainland, played on clay.

=== Riviera circuit and Wimbledon semifinal ===
Starting in February 1906 Wilding toured during almost the entire year across continental Europe and England, sometimes travelling by train but most often on his beloved motorcycle. For the first time he played the French Riviera circuit and won tournaments in cities throughout Europe including Cannes, Paris, Lyon, Barcelona, Wiesbaden, Reading, Prague, Bad Homburg and Vienna. At some of the tournaments in England and Europe he was accompanied by his father with whom he played in various doubles competitions. (Note: Anthony and his father entered the doubles competitions in Prague, Franzensbad, Carlsbad, Baden-Baden and Sheffield.) Together they won the doubles title at the Sheffield and Hallamshire tournament in June 1906. Wilding's run at the 1906 Wimbledon Championships ended, as it had done the previous year, with a straight-sets defeat against the veteran Arthur Gore, this time in the semifinal. After winning the singles title at the London Covered Court Championships in October, beating George Caridia in the final, he travelled by boat to New Zealand (Note: Wilding made a stopover in Melbourne on invitation of Norman Brookes in order to practice with his prospective 1907 Davis Cup doubles partner and play the Victorian Championships. Wilding lost the Victorian singles final in straight sets to Brookes but together they won the doubles title against Dunlop and Heath.) and in late December in his native Christchurch won the singles title at the Australasian Championships, defeating Francis Fisher in the final, and doubles title, partnering compatriot Rodney Heath. A week later he also won the New Zealand Championships against Harry Parker in the final. At the 1907 Wimbledon Championships Wilding had the misfortune to be drawn in the same section (Note: During Wilding's career the draws at Wimbledon did not have seeded players which meant that the strongest players could be drawn against each other in the early rounds. A simplified system of seeding was introduced during the 1924 Wimbledon Championships when up to four players from a country were drawn in the four different quarters of the draw. The current merit–based seeding based on rankings was introduced in 1927.) as tournament favourite and eventual champion Norman Brookes who defeated him in their second-round match in five sets. (Note: Wilding won the All England Plate, a Wimbledon competition for players who were defeated in the first or second round of the singles event at the Wimbledon Championships.) Reluctant to return to New Zealand to practise law, as he originally intended, Wilding instead decided to play a circuit of European tournaments. During the 1907–08 winter, when tennis activity was at a low, he generated income as an English teacher and tennis trainer for aristocratic families in Bohemia and Hungary. In March 1908 he partnered Major Ritchie to win the doubles title at the South of France Championships against multiple Wimbledon champions Lawrence and Reginald Doherty. Wilding won the 1908 Victorian Championships singles title after defeating Fred Alexander.

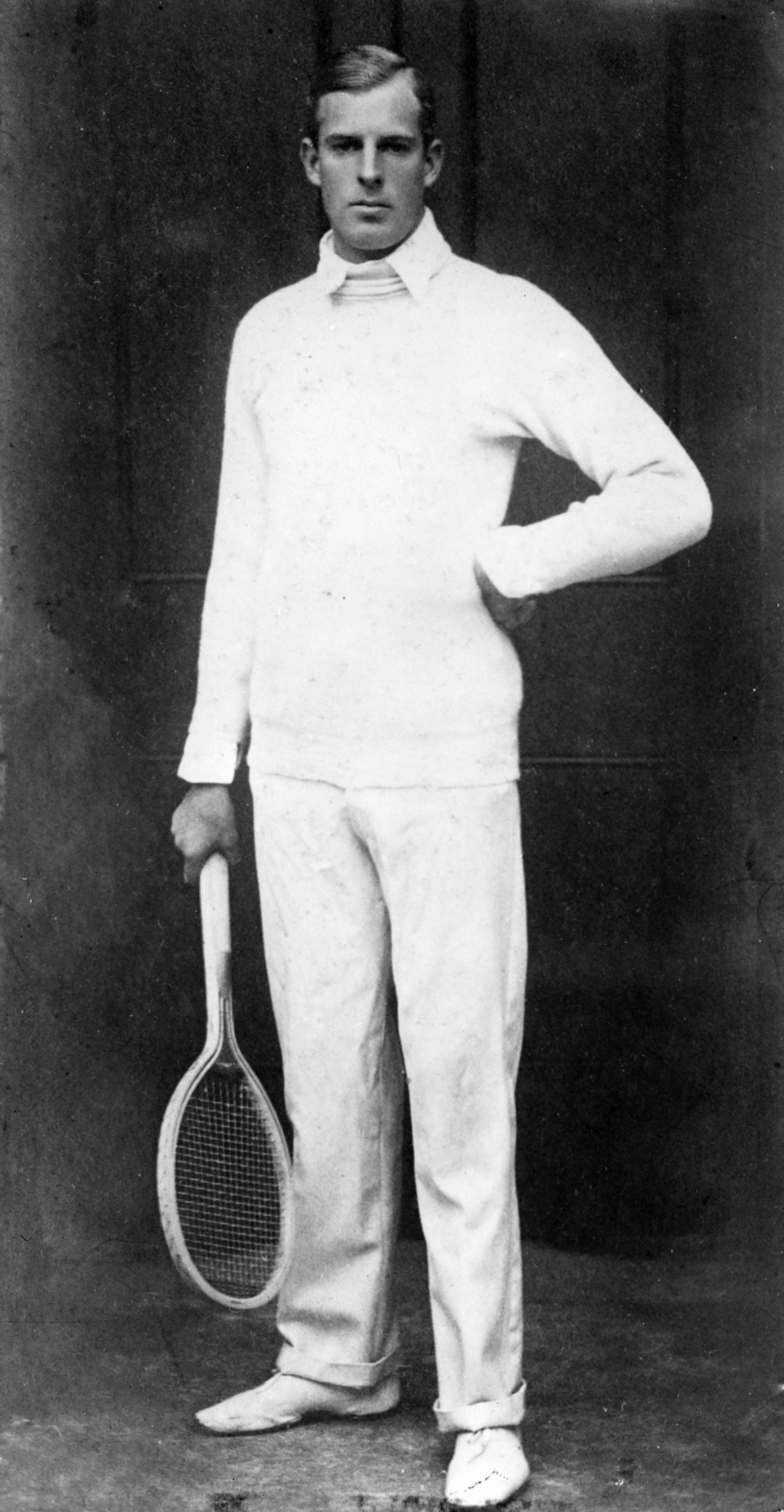
Wilding dressed in tennis attire, c. 1912

Between 1907 and 1909 he helped the Australasian team win three consecutive Davis Cups, the first against the British Isles at Wimbledon and the last two against the United States. He won his second Australasian Championships in 1909, with his remorseless drives proving too much for Ernie Parker to handle in the final. The same year he qualified as a Barrister and Solicitor at the Supreme Court of New Zealand. Focusing on his tennis game, he won the Wimbledon singles title for four straight years between 1910 and 1913. He was the last player to win four successive championships until 1979; when Björn Borg won his fourth successive championship. He attained the first of three No. 1 rankings in 1911. In 1910 and 1912 he defeated Arthur Gore in the final, both times in four sets. In 1911 his opponent Herbert Roper Barrett retired in the final at two sets all. In 1913 at Wimbledon tennis player and author A. Wallis Myers says that he played "the best game of his life", beating American Maurice McLoughlin, the 1912 U.S. National Championships winner, in three straight sets. In 1914 he narrowly missed winning his fifth title in a row, losing in the final to Norman Brookes. In addition, he won four men's doubles titles at Wimbledon, in 1907 and 1914 with Norman Brookes and in 1908 and 1910 partnering with Major Ritchie.

He missed the 1908 Olympics in London because of an administrative error in which the Australasia Olympic committee forgot to officially nominate any tennis players, but at the 1912 Olympics in Stockholm won a bronze medal in the men's indoor singles for Australasia.

During the 1911 Riviera season Wilding defeated Max Decugis in the final of three tournaments in Monte Carlo, Menton and Nice.

=== Triple World Champion ===
Wilding won a unique World Championships triple in 1913:

- The World Hard Court Championship (Paris, clay)
- World Grass Court Championships (Wimbledon, London, grass)
- The World Covered Court Championship (Stockholm, indoor wood)

Tony Wilding won all three events in 1913. In a sense, this was the equivalent of achieving what would later become known as the Grand Slam of Tennis because all three of the major tournaments sanctioned by the world governing body were won by one player and all in one calendar year. (Note: The current four majors were only made officially so from 1924/1925) In 1914 Wilding retained his World Hard Court Championship title in Paris without losing a single set, defeating Ludwig von Salm-Hoogstraeten in the final.

In 1914, after a five-year absence, he returned to Davis Cup play, and with Norman Brookes, lead the Australasian team to another championship, defeating the United States team in the Challenge round before a home crowd at the West Side Tennis Club in Forest Hills, New York. This turned out to be his final tournament. Wilding had entered the 1914 U.S. Championships which followed later in August but withdrew due to the outbreak of World War I and returned to England.

Wilding was a leading tennis player in the world during 1909–1914 and is considered a former world No. 1. Norman Brookes in 1950 compiled a ranking list of greatest tennis players and put Wilding fourth behind Bill Tilden and the Dohertys, and ahead of Budge, Kramer, Lacoste and Perry. Over his career, he was popular among fans and players alike, being honest and professional, advising players to "[b]e moderate in all things, especially in eating, smoking and drinking." His style was to play powershots from the baseline.

== Other sports ==
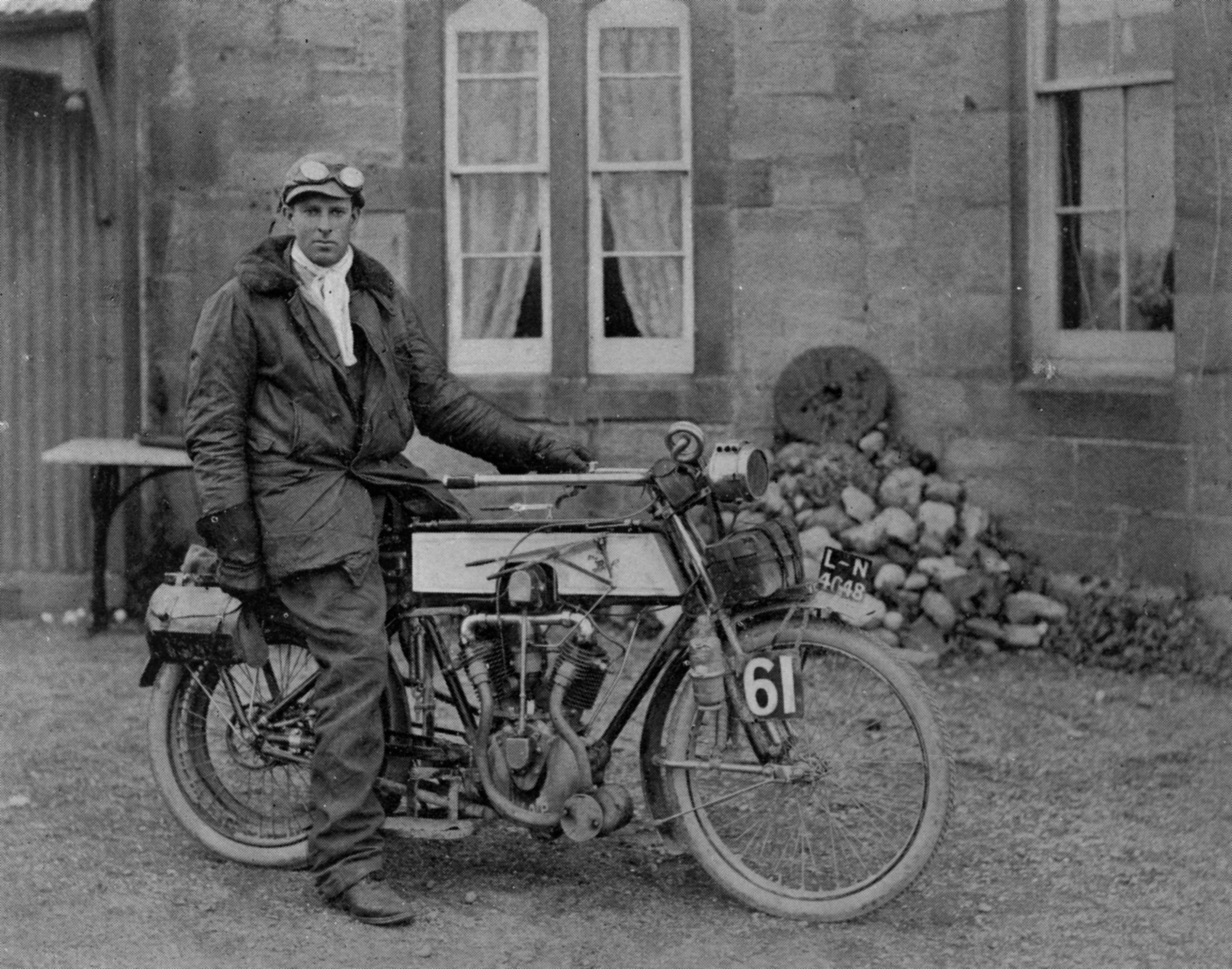
Wilding on a BAT motorcycle off to John o' Groats from Land's End in 1908

He also played for the Canterbury cricket team in the early 1900s where he participated in two first-class matches as a lower middle-order batsman and medium-pace change bowler. During his first summer at Cambridge in 1903 he focused almost exclusively on cricket before switching to tennis. Wilding also played rugby at Trinity College, mainly to keep fit during the winter months, and was part of the Trinity team that competed against Racing Club de France. He considered that "play must be combined with various other exercises. The prizefighter does not limit his training to sparring" and in doing so advanced the physical requirements for competitive tennis. He was a keen motorcycle (with sidecar) rider with many long trips in Europe, New Zealand and America. In July 1908 he won a gold medal in a 1,437 kilometres (893 mi) reliability trial from Land's End to John o' Groats on his BAT-JAP motorcycle. Several "mighty rides" (Myers) in Europe in 1910 included London to Lake Geneva and back, some 4,800 kilometres (3,000 mi), including 560 kilometres (350 mi) from Évian-les-Bains to Paris in one day. He ventured into places with poor roads like Hungary and Serbia. Wilding frequently used a motorcycle to travel between tennis tournaments on the European continent.

== Major finals ==
=== Grand Slam singles ===
Result	Year	Championship	Surface	Opponent	Score
Win	1906	Australasian Championships	Grass	(New Zealand) Francis Fisher	6–0, 6–4, 6–4
Win	1909	Australasian Championships	Grass	(Australia) Ernie Parker	6–1, 7–5, 6–2
Win	1910	Wimbledon	Grass	(United Kingdom) Arthur Gore	6–4, 7–5, 4–6, 6–2
Win	1911	Wimbledon	Grass	(United Kingdom) Herbert Roper Barrett	6–4, 4–6, 2–6, 6–2 ret.
Win	1912	Wimbledon	Grass	(United Kingdom) Arthur Gore	6–4, 6–4, 4–6, 6–4
Win	1913	Wimbledon (Note: Between 1913 and 1923 Wimbledon was known as the World Grass Court Championships sanctioned by the ILTF)	Grass	(United States) Maurice McLoughlin	8–6, 6–3, 10–8
Loss	1914	Wimbledon (Note: Between 1913 and 1923 Wimbledon was known as the World Grass Court Championships sanctioned by the ILTF)	Grass	(Australia) Norman Brookes	4–6, 4–6, 5–7

=== World Championships singles ===
Result	Year	Championship	Surface	Opponent	Score
Win	1913	World Hard Court Championships	Clay	(France) André Gobert	6–3, 6–3, 1–6, 6–4
Win	1913	World Covered Court Championships	Wood	(France) Maurice Germot	5–7, 6–2, 6–3, 6–1
Win	1914	World Hard Court Championships	Clay	(Austria-Hungary) Ludwig von Salm-Hoogstraeten	6–0, 6–2, 6–4

== Performance timeline ==
Key
W	F	SF	QF	#R	RR	Q#	DNQ	A	NH

(W) winner; (F) finalist; (SF) semifinalist; (QF) quarterfinalist; (#R) rounds 4, 3, 2, 1; (RR) round-robin stage; (Q#) qualification round; (DNQ) did not qualify; (A) absent; (NH) not held; (SR) strike rate (events won / competed); (W–L) win–loss record.

Events with a challenge round: (W_{C}) won; (CR) lost the challenge round; (F_{A}) all comers' finalist

	1904	1905	1906	1907	1908	1909	1910	1911	1912	1913	1914	SR	W–L	Win %
Grand Slam tournaments												6 / 12	30–6	83.3
French	not held											0 / 0	0–0	–
Wimbledon	2R	QF	SF	2R	QF	A	W_{C}	W_{C}	W_{C}	W_{C}	CR	4 / 10	23–6	79.3
U.S.	A	A	A	A	A	A	A	A	A	A	A	0 / 0	0–0	–
Australian	NH	A	W	A	A	W	A	A	A	A	A	2 / 2	7–0	100.0
Win–loss	1–1	3–1	7–1	1–1	3–1	4–0	8–0	1–0	1–0	1–0	0–1			

== Military service and death ==
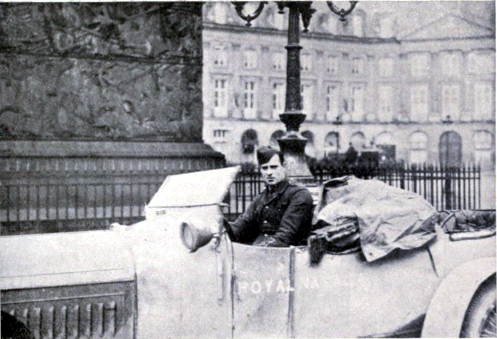
Wilding in his armoured car in Paris in January 1915

Shortly after the outbreak of World War I, Wilding joined the Royal Marines on advice of Winston Churchill who was then First Lord of the Admiralty. He was gazetted a second lieutenant in early October 1914. Wilding remained in the Marines for just a few days and was then attached to the Intelligence Corps due to his intimate knowledge of the continent and his skills as a motorist. At the end of October he joined the Royal Naval Armoured Car Division in the battlefields of northern France where he had thirty men, three guns and armoured cars under his command. After a week's leave in London in February 1915 he returned to France on 16 March 1915 and was posted to a new squadron made up of armoured Rolls-Royce cars under the command of the Duke of Westminster. He was ranked a lieutenant. Before long the squadron was moved near the front and on 2 May Wilding received notice of his promotion to captain. In his last letter dated 8 May he wrote "For really the first time in seven and a half months I have a job on hand which is likely to end in gun, I, and the whole outfit being blown to hell. However if we succeed we will help our infantry no end." The next day, 9 May, he was killed in action at 4:45 in the afternoon during the Battle of Aubers Ridge at Neuve-Chapelle, France when a shell exploded on the roof of the dug-out he was sheltering in.

Wilding was buried the next day at the front but was later re-interred at the Rue-des-Berceaux Military Cemetery in Richebourg-l'Avoué, Pas-de-Calais, France. He had been dating, and was rumored to be about to marry, Broadway star Maxine Elliott, 15 years his senior.

Wilding is remembered on the Waltham Park memorial gates in Christchurch, opened in 1922 to commemorate 43 men from the local Waltham, St Martins, and Opawa communities who died in service during World War I.

== Legacy and honours ==
In 1978, he was inducted into the International Tennis Hall of Fame. Wilding Park, the principal venue for tennis in Christchurch, New Zealand, was named after his father, Frederick, but in the public perception became associated with him. He was inducted into the New Zealand Sports Hall of Fame in 1990. The New Zealand Post issued a stamp of Anthony Wilding in 1992 as part of the Health Stamps series to support children with emotional and behavioural problems. Shortly after Wilding's death the sculptor Paolo Troubetzkoy made a bronze statuette based on him titled Physical Energy.

== Records ==
=== All time ===
Tournament	Since	Record accomplished	Players matched
All tournaments	1877	114 career outdoor titles won (1900–1915)	Rod Laver
All tournaments	1877	23 titles won in a single season (1906)	Stands alone
All tournaments	1877	19 consecutive titles (1913–1914)	Bill Tilden
All tournaments	1877	91.77% (636–57) career match winning percentage	Stands alone
All tournaments	1877	92.46% (564–46) outdoor match winning percentage	Stands alone
All tournaments	1877	96.01% (313–13) clay court match winning percentage	Stands alone
All tournaments	1877	120 consecutive clay court match victories (1910–1914)	Stands alone
All tournaments	1877	22 consecutive clay court titles (1912–1914)	Stands alone

== See also ==
- Gore–Wilding rivalry
- Tennis male players statistics
- List of Olympians killed in World War I
