= Dinard International =

Defunct tennis tournament
- Tour: ILTF Circuit (1913-69)
- Founded: 1889; 137 years ago
- Abolished: 1969; 57 years ago
- Location: Dinard; France
- Venue: Tennis Club de Dinard

The Dinard International also known as the Dinard Championships or Championnats de Dinard and also known as the Dinard Cup or Coupe de Dinard was a combined men's and women's open clay court tennis tournament established in 1889 and was first played at the Tennis Club de Dinard, Dinard, France. The tournament became part of ILTC Circuit and was staged until 1968.

== History ==
On 25 April 1879 the Dinard Lawn Tennis Club was founded and in 1886 it began to organise competitions. In September 1889 it established an open international tournament that quickly grew in importance and prestige. In the early years of the event a challenge round was in play with the men's players competing for the Dinard Challenge Cup, a challenge round for women was in place from 1903 to 1907.

Tournaments winners at first was mainly dominated by players from Great Britain and Ireland until just before the start of World War I, when the first French winner of the gentlemen's singles was Max Decugis in 1910. The French women were somewhat more successful their first singles title winner was Yvonne Prévost in 1899. The most successful players were Britain's Wilberforce Eaves won the men's event ten times, and French player Suzanne Devé who won the women's singles event six times. The tournament was not held during World War I from 1914 to 1918. During the Second World War it was not held from 1940 to 1945. The event ran until 1968 when it was discontinued as part of the ILTF World Circuit.
