= World number 1 ranked male tennis players =

World number 1 ranked male tennis players is a year-by-year listing of the male tennis players who were ranked as world No. 1 by various contemporary and modern sources. The annual source rankings from which the No. 1 players are drawn are cited for each player's name, with a summary of the most important tennis events of each year also included. If world rankings are not available, recent rankings by tennis writers for historical years are accessed, with the dates of the recent rankings identified. In the period 1948–1953, when contemporary professional world rankings were not created, the U.S. professional rankings are cited.

== History of rankings ==
=== Before 1912 ===
For the period between the birth of lawn tennis to 1912, few contemporary worldwide rankings exist. Some national tennis federations such as the USLTA (USTA) in the United States did create national rankings, however. Also, British publications ranking British players are listed. Retrospective world rankings made by the International Tennis Hall of Fame are also listed.

=== Between 1912 and 1973: opinion-based rankings and professional series rankings ===
Before the Open Era of tennis arrived in 1968, opinion-based rankings for amateur players were generally compiled either for a full year of play or in September following the U.S. Championships. Professional players were ranked by journalists, promoters, and players' associations in opinion-based rankings either at the end of the year or in the spring or summer when the world pro tours finished. There were also performance-based point ranking systems attached to professional tournament series in 1946, 1959, 1960, 1964, 1965, 1966, 1967 and 1968, and performance-based pro rankings from the pro tours in 1942, 1954, 1961, and 1963. Even for amateurs, however, there was no single official overall ranking that encompassed the entire world. Instead, national rankings were compiled by the national tennis association of each country, with world rankings being the preserve of tennis journalists or newspaper reporters. The end-of-year amateur rankings issued by official organizations such as the United States Lawn Tennis Association were based on judgments and opinions and not on mathematical formulae assigning points for wins and losses.

==== Professional tennis in Europe before 1926 ====
Thomas Burke, tutor of the Tennis Club de Paris and former teacher of two-time Wimbledon champion Joshua Pim, was reportedly as good a player as the leading amateurs. Charles Haggett was the best English teaching professional during the early 20th century. In 1913, Haggett settled in the United States, having been invited by the West Side Tennis Club of Forest Hills, New York and became the coach of the American Davis Cup team. In practice matches, he beat the leading amateurs Anthony Wilding, Wimbledon winner and Maurice McLoughlin, Wimbledon All Comer's winner.

In the 1920s, Karel Koželuh, Albert Burke (son of Thomas Burke), and Roman Najuch were probably the most notable, as well as the best, of these players. The Bristol Cup, held at Beaulieu or at Cannes on the French Riviera and won seven consecutive times by Koželuh, was "the world's only significant pro tennis tournament." Koželuh went on to become one of the best of the touring professionals in the 1930s. He and Burke, however, were not listed among the top players before 1928, as this was the first year when a retrospective ranking was published for all the top players, amateur and professional.

==== Major professional tournaments before 1968 ====
Three major tournaments held a certain tradition and usually had the best of the leading players. The most prestigious of the three was generally the London Indoor Professional Championship. Played in most years between 1934 and 1990 at the Wembley Arena in the United Kingdom, the tournament was authorised by the Lawn Tennis Association from the 1950s onwards. The oldest of the three was the United States Professional Championship, played between 1927 and 1999 (except 1944 and 1996) with the approval and participation of the USPLTA from 1928 to 1954. In 1950, the USPLTA U.S. Pro was held in Cleveland. In 1951, the USPLTA U.S. Pro was held at Forest Hills, however there was also in 1951 the PTPA-approved U.S. Pro (under the billed name International Pro) held at Cleveland. Between 1952–53 and 1955–62 the PTPA version of the U.S. Pro was played in Cleveland (under the billed name International or World Professional Championships). The USPLTA U.S. Pro was held again at the L.A. Tennis Club in 1954 under Kramer's management, however the Cleveland version of the U.S. Pro was also held in 1954 under the billed name World Professional Championships. The third major tournament was the French Professional Championship, played at Roland Garros in the years 1930–1932, 1934–1939, 1956, 1958–62 and 1968, and at Stade Coubertin from 1963 to 1967. The British and American championships continued into the Open Era, but devolved to the status of minor tournaments.

These three tournaments (Wembley Pro, French Pro and U.S. Pro) through 1967 are often referred to retrospectively as the major pro events by tennis historians. However, in some years other tournaments had stronger fields and larger money prizes. The 1957 Forest Hills Tournament of Champions was broadcast live in its entirety on the CBS national television network in the U.S. The Forest Hills professional tournament in 1966 boasted the largest prize money of the season, and a film was made of the final. The Wimbledon Pro in 1967 was broadcast complete in colour on BBC television in Britain and awarded the largest prize money of any pro tournament up to that time.

Before 1973, there were only a few rankings based on the points players obtained for achieving a certain level of performance in particular tournaments, but there were journalists or officials (on their personal behalf) or promoters or players themselves who listed their own subjective annual rankings. In 1946, 1959, 1960 and 1964–1968 there were point ranking systems and seeding lists applied to professional series of tournaments involving all of the best pros. In 1946, 1959 and 1960 there were also World Professional Championship tours with a small number of pros, which did not produce point rankings. The winners of the 1946, 1959 and 1960 World Professional Championship Tours were described as "world champion" in many reports, although the points ranking system in 1959 was also referred to in Kramer's brochure with the term "World Championship Tennis". In 1961 and 1963, the ITPTA World Championship Tour produced an official ranking order for the contract professionals. In some years, however, only a small number of professional promoters, players or journalists released opinion-based rankings at the end of the tennis year. Retrospective opinion-based-rankings by tennis historians or sports statisticians many years after the tennis year ended (e.g. in the 2000s for a year in the 1950s) are also listed.

=== From 1973 onward: modern ATP rankings ===
In August 1973, the Association of Tennis Professionals (ATP) introduced its own rankings. These mathematical merit-based rankings were published 11 times that year and with increasing frequency the following years until they were published weekly from 1979 onward. In the 1970s and 1980s they did not take into account certain events, such as the Davis Cup, the WCT Finals and the year-end Masters (currently named the ATP Finals). Stan Smith, a leading player in the 1970s when ATP rankings started said "there was a great deal of conversation and tweaking during the formative years as to the weight of the various tournaments and even the weight of the rounds in the tournaments. The prize money per round was also debated in conjunction with the ranking points." Since 1990 the ATP has awarded points for the ATP Finals.

==== Disputed rankings ====
In the early years after the ATP rankings were introduced, other rankings proposed by tennis experts or by the players themselves were possibly more accurate because they included those events and adjusted the rankings to reflect the actual importance of particular tournaments. In 1977, Connors was No. 1 in the ATP ranking but Borg and Vilas were the men that received most No. 1 rankings from other sources. Since the 1990s, the ATP rankings have generally been accepted as the official rankings. Since 1978 the ITF (represented initially by a panel of experts consisting of Don Budge, Lew Hoad and Fred Perry) designated the yearly ITF World Champions. (Note: When ITF announced the World Champion title it indicated that it would be based on player performances at the Grand Slam tournaments, the Davis Cup, the Masters and the WCT Finals.)

Some recent tennis writers provide rankings for certain players in the distant past on the basis of periods, for example Kramer ranked as No. 1 for the period 1946 to 1953. Notations will be made for annual No. 1 rankings derived from a period ranking.

== List of No. 1 ranked players ==
=== 1877–1911: National and world rankings ===
Early tennis era rankings are more variable in nature due to limited sourcing. Few contemporary worldwide rankings exist for this period.

Year	Rankings and tournament results summary
1877	Rankings: Spencer Gore ranked No. 1 by Tennis: Lawn Tennis.; Year summary Gore was the Wimbledon champion.
1878	Rankings: Frank Hadow ranked No. 1 by Methven Brownlee in Lawn Tennis.; Year summary Hadow was the Wimbledon champion.
1879	Rankings: John Hartley ranked No. 1 by Methven Brownlee in Lawn Tennis.; Year summary Hartley was the Wimbledon champion.
1880	Rankings: John Hartley ranked No. 1 by Methven Brownlee in Lawn Tennis.; Year summary Hartley won the only match he played, against Lawford in the Wimbledon final.
1881	Rankings: William Renshaw ranked world No. 1 by the International Hall of Fame.; William Renshaw ranked No. 1 British player by R. Osborn, as reported by Lance Tingay in his encyclopedia.; Year summary William Renshaw was the Irish and Wimbledon champion.
1882	Rankings: William Renshaw ranked British No. 1 by The "Field" Lawn Tennis Calendar.; Year summary William Renshaw was the Irish and Wimbledon champion, his brother Ernest being the challenger both times.
1883	Rankings: William Renshaw ranked British No. 1 by "The Field" Lawn Tennis Calendar.; Year summary William Renshaw won the only singles match he played at Wimbledon against Irish champion Ernest Renshaw.
1884	Rankings: William Renshaw ranked British No. 1 by the Pastime classification of British players.; Year summary William Renshaw won the only singles match he played at Wimbledon against Irish champion Lawford.
1885	Rankings: William Renshaw ranked British No. 1 by the Pastime classification of British players.; Richard Sears ranked U.S. No. 1 by USTA.; Year summary William Renshaw won the only singles match he played at Wimbledon against Irish champion Lawford.
1886	Rankings: William Renshaw ranked British No. 1 by the Pastime classification of British players.; Richard Sears ranked U.S. No. 1 by USTA.; Year summary William Renshaw won the only singles match he played at Wimbledon against Irish champion Lawford.
1887	Rankings: Herbert Lawford ranked world No. 1 by the International Hall of Fame.; Herbert Lawford ranked British No. 1 by the Pastime classification of British players.; Richard Sears ranked U.S. No. 1 by USTA.; Year summary Lawford beat Ernest Renshaw at Wimbledon and lost to him at the Irish.
1888	Rankings: Ernest Renshaw ranked British No. 1 by the Pastime classification of British players.; Ernest Renshaw ranked No. 1 by Valentine Hall in Lawn Tennis in America.; Henry Slocum ranked U.S. No. 1 by USTA.; Year summary Ernest Renshaw was the Irish and Wimbledon champion. Hamilton was the Irish challenger, and the Northern Championships title holder.
1889	Rankings: William Renshaw ranked British No. 1 by the Pastime classification of British players.; Henry Slocum ranked U.S. No. 1 by USTA.; Year summary Renshaw won the Wimbledon title. Hamilton beat William Renshaw at the Irish Championships, won the Northern Championship title as well, but lost in the Wimbledon semis to Harry Barlow.
1890	Rankings: Willoughby Hamilton ranked British No. 1 by the Pastime classification of British players.; Oliver Campbell ranked U.S. No. 1 by USTA.; Year summary Hamilton won Wimbledon Championships, but lost to Pim at the Northern Championships and Lewis in Irish Championships (although he was the Irish champ, he had severe defeats by Pim and G. Chaytor).
1891	Rankings: Wilfred Baddeley ranked world No. 1 by the International Hall of Fame.; Wilfred Baddeley ranked British No. 1 by the Pastime classification of British players.; Oliver Campbell ranked U.S. No. 1 by USTA.; Year summary Lewis won the Irish Championships, Baddeley was the Wimbledon champion, but they did not meet. Both of them beat Pim, although Pim also beat Baddeley at the Northern Championships.
1892	Rankings: Ernest Renshaw ranked British No. 1 by the Pastime classification of British players.; Oliver Campbell ranked U.S. No. 1 by USTA.; Year summary Ernest Renshaw won the Irish Championship, Baddeley was the Wimbledon champion but they did not meet.
1893	Rankings: Joshua Pim ranked British No. 1 by the Pastime classification of British players.; Robert Wrenn ranked U.S. No. 1 by USTA.; Year summary Pim won Wimbledon, the Irish Championship and Northern Championship titles as well (first male player to win all three titles in the same year, Maud Watson had done it earlier in 1885.) . He defeated Baddeley twice.
1894	Rankings: Joshua Pim ranked British No. 1 by the Pastime classification of British players.; Robert Wrenn ranked U.S. No. 1 by USTA.; Year summary Pim defended his Wimbledon and Irish titles. Wilfred Baddeley was the Wimbledon challenger and won the Northern beating Pim.
1895	Rankings: Wilfred Baddeley ranked British No. 1 by the Pastime classification of British players.; Fred Hovey ranked U.S. No. 1 by USTA.; Year summary Pim was the Irish champion demolishing Wilberforce Eaves, but he was absent from Wimbledon that Baddeley won narrowly beating Eaves.
1896	Rankings: Wilfred Baddeley and Harold Mahony ranked joint British No. 1 by The Lawn Tennis classification of British players (foreign and covered court tournaments were not taken into account).; Robert Wrenn ranked U.S. No. 1 by USTA.; Year summary Baddeley beat Mahony both at the Irish and Northern Championships, but lost to him at Wimbledon. John Pius Boland won the Olympic gold.
1897	Rankings: Reginald Doherty ranked world No. 1 by the International Hall of Fame.; Wilfred Baddeley, Reginald Doherty and Wilberforce Eaves co-ranked British No. 1 by The Lawn Tennis classification of British players (foreign and covered court tournaments were not taken into account).; Robert Wrenn ranked U.S. No. 1 by USTA.; Year summary Doherty was beaten by Irish champion Eaves in Dublin, by Baddeley at the M Championships and by Mahony at an international match, however he beat all of them at Wimbledon. Wrenn beat Eaves at the U.S. but lost to Larned in Boston.
1898	Rankings: Laurence Doherty ranked world No. 1 by the International Hall of Fame.; G. Chaytor, Laurence Doherty, Reginald Doherty, Wilberforce Eaves and Sydney Howard Smith co-ranked British No. 1 by The Lawn Tennis classification of British players (foreign and covered court tournaments were not taken into account).; Malcolm Whitman ranked U.S. No. 1 by USTA.; Year summary Wimbledon champion Reginald Doherty lost to Irish Mahony in Dublin. Laurie Doherty defeated Mahony at Wimbledon, but lost the challenge round final to his brother.
1899	Rankings: Reginald Doherty and Sydney Howard Smith co-ranked British No. 1 by The Lawn Tennis classification of British players (foreign and covered court tournaments were not taken into account).; Malcolm Whitman ranked U.S. No. 1 by USTA.; Reginald Doherty ranked No. 1 by Charles Voigt of Boston.; Year summary Reginald Doherty won both the Wimbledon and the Irish titles and had an unbeaten season. Whitman won all the important US tournaments, and according to Potter (in his Kings of the Court book) he played magnificently.
1900	Rankings: Malcolm Whitman ranked world No. 1 by the International Hall of Fame.; Reginald Doherty ranked British No. 1 by British author N. L. Jackson in the British players in the American Outing.; Malcolm Whitman U.S. No. 1 by USTA.; Year summary Doherty won both the Wimbledon and the Irish titles. Whitman won all the important US titles and demolished Gore in Davis Cup. Laurence Doherty won the Olympic gold.
1901	Rankings: Arthur Gore ranked world No. 1 by the International Hall of Fame.; William Larned ranked U.S. No. 1 by USTA.; Year summary Doherty (defending Irish champion) lost his Wimbledon title to Gore. Larned was the best American in the absence of Whitman.
1902	Rankings: Laurence Doherty and Reginald Doherty co-ranked British No. 1 by The Lawn Tennis and Croquet classification of British players (some continental tournaments were also taken into account).; William Larned ranked U.S. No. 1 by USTA.; Year summary Irish and Wimbledon champion Laurence Doherty was not selected for Davis Cup. U.S. champion Larned was 1–1 with Reginald, who did not play singles anymore in England.
1903	Rankings: William Larned ranked U.S. No. 1 by USTA.; Year summary Laurence Doherty won Wimbledon, the U.S. Championships and Davis Cup. Larned nearly beats Doherty at Davis Cup.
1904	Rankings: Laurence Doherty ranked British No. 1 by the Lawn Tennis and Badminton classification of British players (by the handicapper Simond).; Holcombe Ward ranked U.S. No. 1 by USTA.; Year summary Laurence Doherty won Wimbledon. Ward won the U.S. Championships.
1905	Rankings: Laurence Doherty ranked No. 1 by the Lawn Tennis and Badminton classification of British players and the American and Australian visitor.; Beals Wright ranked U.S. No. 1 by USTA.; Year summary Doherty was the Wimbledon champion. U.S. champion Wright beat Wimbledon challenger Brookes twice, but lost to Gore at Wimbledon.
1906	Rankings: William Clothier ranked U.S. No. 1 by USTA.; Year summary Laurence Doherty was the Wimbledon champion. Clothier won the U.S. Championships. Brookes won the Victorian Championships against Wilding but did not play outside Australia.
1907	Rankings: Norman Brookes ranked world No. 1 by the International Hall of Fame.; William Larned ranked U.S. No. 1 by USTA.; Year summary Brookes was undefeated in Great Britain, he won Wimbledon, the Northern Championships and the Davis Cup preliminary and challenge rounds. Larned was the U.S. and Boston champion (both Clothier and Wright were absent).
1908	Rankings: William Larned ranked U.S. No. 1 by USTA.; Year summary Larned was the U.S. and Boston champion. Brookes won the Davis Cup but lost his match to U.S. No. 2 Wright and narrowly beat Fred Alexander. Arthur Gore was the Wimbledon champion in a weak field. Gore won the Olympic indoor tennis gold medal while Josiah Ritchie won the Olympic outdoor tennis gold medal.
1909	Rankings: William Larned ranked U.S. No. 1 by USTA.; Year summary Larned was the U.S. and Boston and won all his Davis Cup matches. Anthony Wilding defeated Brookes at the Victorian Championships.
1910	Rankings: William Larned ranked U.S. No. 1 by USTA.; Year summary Larned was once again the U.S. and Boston champion (he was named the best player of the world next April by British journalist and author, A. E. Crawley). Anthony Wilding was the Wimbledon champion.
1911	Rankings: Anthony Wilding ranked world No. 1 by the International Hall of Fame.; William Larned ranked U.S. No. 1 by USTA.; Year summary Wilding barely defended his Wimbledon title. Brookes won the Australasian Championships and Davis Cup. Larned was the U.S. and Boston champion.

=== 1912–present: Annual and year-end rankings ===
From 1912 sources are more detailed and better documented. All players who received a world number one ranking citation during the year are listed in the number one column.

Year	No. 1 professional	No. 1 amateur	Sources of rankings and tournament results summary
1912	N/A	Norman Brookes (AUS)	Rankings: Norman Brookes ranked world No. 1 by: A. E. Crawley.; E. B. Dewhurst.; R. Norris Williams.; Year summary Wilding was the Wimbledon champion, but lost on wood to Gobert and Dixon. McLoughlin won the U.S. Championships.
1913	N/A	Maurice McLoughlin (USA); James Cecil Parke (IRE); Anthony Wilding (NZL)	Rankings: McLoughlin ranked No. 1 by B. H. Liddell Hart.; Parke ranked No. 1 by American Lawn Tennis.; Wilding ranked No. 1 by: A. Wallis Myers.; Lawn-Tennis.; The Field.; E. B. Dewhurst.; London Evening Standard.; Year summary Brookes only played in Australia and gave a walkover in the final of the Victorian Championships (then the most important tournament in Australia even ahead the Australasian Championship). Wilding won all three of the ILTF's World Championships – Wimbledon, the World Hard Court Championships (clay) and the World Covered Court Championships (indoor). Maurice McLoughlin won the U.S. Championships.
1914	N/A	Norman Brookes (AUS); Maurice McLoughlin (USA); James Cecil Parke (IRE)	Rankings: Brookes ranked No. 1 by "Austral" (R. M. Kidston), The Referee.; McLoughlin ranked No. 1 by: A. Wallis Myers, with Brookes and Wilding tied for No. 2.; Theodore Mavrogordato, with Brookes and Wilding tied for No. 2.; "Argent" in Lawn Tennis and Badminton", with Brookes, Wilding and R. Norris Williams tied for No. 2.; E. B. Dewhurst.; Parke ranked No. 1 by P. A. Vaile.; Year summary Norman Brookes won Wimbledon, Wilding won the World Hard Court Championships (clay).
1915– 1918	World War I, no world rankings		
1919	N/A	Bill Johnston (USA); Gerald Patterson (AUS)	Rankings: Johnston and Patterson co-ranked No. 1 by A. Wallis Myers.; Year summary Patterson won Wimbledon. Johnston won the U.S. Championships.
1920	N/A	Bill Tilden (USA)	Rankings: Tilden ranked No. 1 by: A. Wallis Myers.; "Austral" (R. M. Kidston), The Referee.; Year summary Bill Tilden won Wimbledon and the U.S. Championship.
1921	N/A	Bill Tilden (USA)	Rankings: Tilden ranked No. 1 by: A. Wallis Myers.; B. H. Liddell Hart, The National Review, London.; "Austral" (R. M. Kidston), The Referee.; Gerald Patterson.; Year summary Bill Tilden won Wimbledon, the World Hard Court Championships (clay) and the U.S. Championships.
1922	N/A	Bill Johnston (USA); Bill Tilden (USA)	Rankings: Johnston ranked No. 1 by B. H. Liddell Hart, with Tilden No. 2.; Tilden ranked No. 1 by: A. Wallis Myers, with Johnston No. 2.; S. Wallis Merrihew, American Lawn Tennis, with Johnston No. 2.; The New York Times.; Year summary Bill Tilden won the U.S. Championships.
1923	N/A	Bill Tilden (USA)	Rankings: Tilden ranked No. 1 by: A. Wallis Myers.; B. H. Liddell Hart.; Year summary Johnston won two of the three International Lawn Tennis Federation (ILTF) designated 'World Championships' – Wimbledon and the World Hard Court Championships (clay). Bill Tilden won the U.S. Championships.
1924	N/A	Bill Tilden (USA)	Rankings: Tilden ranked No. 1 by: A. Wallis Myers.; B. H. Liddell Hart.; Samuel Brookman.; Year summary The U.S. Championships, from this year officially designated as a Major Championship by the ILTF, was won by Tilden. The Olympic winner in Paris was Vincent Richards.
1925	N/A	Bill Tilden (USA)	Rankings: Tilden ranked No. 1 by: A. Wallis Myers.; Maxime Lanet, L'Auto.; Frank Poxon, The Daily News.; James Anderson.; "Server", The Australasian.; Year summary Tilden won the U.S. Championships.
1926	N/A	René Lacoste (FRA)	Rankings: Lacoste ranked No. 1 by: A. Wallis Myers.; Suzanne Lenglen.; Stanley Doust, Daily Mail.; Bill Tilden.; Year summary Lacoste won the U.S. Championships.
1927	Karel Koželuh (TCH); Vincent Richards (USA)	René Lacoste (FRA)	Rankings: Koželuh and Richards co-ranked professional No. 1 by Ray Bowers.; Lacoste ranked amateur No. 1 by: A. Wallis Myers.; President of the U.S. ranking committee.; Marcel Berger.; Émile Deve.; Henri Cochet.; Jean Samazeuilh.; Year summary Lacoste won the French and U.S. Championships.
1928	Karel Koželuh (TCH)	Henri Cochet (FRA)	Rankings: Koželuh ranked pro No. 1 by: Vincent Richards.; Ray Bowers (No. 4 in combined pro/amateur ranking).; Cochet ranked amateur No. 1 by: Pierre Gillou.; Bill Tilden.; W. J. Daish.; A. Wallis Myers.; Vincent Richards.; F. Gordon Lowe.; American Lawn Tennis.; Helen Wills.; Ray Bowers (No. 1 in combined pro/amateur ranking).; Year summary Cochet won the French and U.S. Championships.
1929	Karel Koželuh (TCH)	Henri Cochet (FRA); René Lacoste (FRA)	Rankings: Koželuh ranked pro No. 1 by: American Lawn Tennis.; Bill Tilden.; Ray Bowers (No. 5 in combined pro/amateur ranking).; Bernard Brown, Brooklyn Times-Union (No. 2 in combined pro/amateur ranking).; Cochet ranked amateur No. 1 by: A. Wallis Myers.; Bill Tilden.; F. Gordon Lowe.; Vincent Richards.; Combined ranking in L'Auto (unanimous).; Ray Bowers (No. 1 in combined pro/amateur ranking).; Karel Koželuh.; Bernard Brown, Brooklyn Times-Union (No. 1 in combined pro/amateur ranking).; Lacoste ranked amateur No. 1 by "Austral" (R. M. Kidston), The Referee.; Year summary Lacoste won the French Championships, Cochet won Wimbledon.
1930	Karel Koželuh (TCH); Vincent Richards (USA)	Jean Borotra (FRA); Henri Cochet (FRA)	Rankings: Koželuh ranked pro No. 1 by Bernard Brown, Brooklyn Times-Union.; Richards ranked pro No. 1 by Ray Bowers (No. 3 in combined pro/amateur ranking).; Borotra ranked amateur No. 1 by Bill Tilden, with Cochet No. 2.; Cochet ranked amateur No. 1 by: A. Wallis Myers.; Pierre Gillou, with Tilden No. 2.; Didier Poulain, L'Auto, with Tilden No. 2.; Vincent Richards.; René Lacoste, with Tilden No. 2.; Ray Bowers (No. 1 in combined pro/amateur ranking).; Year summary Cochet won the French Championships, Tilden won Wimbledon.
1931	Bill Tilden (USA)	Henri Cochet (FRA)	Rankings: Tilden ranked pro No. 1 by: George Agutter.; Ray Bowers (No. 1 in combined pro/amateur ranking).; Bernard Brown, Brooklyn Times-Union (No. 1 in combined pro/amateur ranking).; Cochet ranked amateur No. 1 by: A. Wallis Myers.; Sport magazine (Zürich).; Pierre Gillou.; Didier Pioline, L'Auto.; Noel Dickson, The Herald (Melbourne).; R. M. Kidston.; Stanley Doust, Daily Mail.; "Service", Western Mail (Western Australia); Bill Tilden.; Ray Bowers (No. 2 in combined pro/amateur ranking).; Bernard Brown, Brooklyn Times-Union (No. 2 in combined pro/amateur ranking).; Year summary Cochet had only three tournament wins (Monte Carlo being the most prestigious); Tilden, aged 38, turned professional and, in a World (Pro) Championship head-to-head tour, defeated Koželuh 50 to 17 in the North American tour. The two players also competed in the first European tour with Martin Plaa, Albert Burke, Frank Hunter and Hans Nüsslein: many results are unknown nevertheless Tilden lost only one match against all these opponents (Koželuh at Amsterdam); Tilden also defeated Richards, who had abandoned his retirement, either 12–1 over the year (McCauley) or 10 to 0 (Bowers); Tilden beat Richards in the U.S. Pro.
1932	Martin Plaa (FRA); Bill Tilden (USA)	Ellsworth Vines (USA)	Rankings: Plaa ranked pro No. 1 by Tilden, with Tilden No. 2.; Tilden ranked pro No. 1 by: Ray Bowers (No. 2 in combined pro/amateur ranking).; Ellsworth Vines (No. 7 in combined pro/amateur ranking).; Vines ranked amateur No. 1 by: Pierre Gillou.; A. Wallis Myers.; F. Gordon Lowe.; Jean Borotra.; Bernard Brown, Brooklyn Times-Union.; Ray Bowers (No. 1 in combined pro/amateur ranking).; Year summary Vines, a 20-year-old, won Wimbledon and the U.S. Championships; in the pros Tilden beat Vinnie Richards 12–1 and had a leading record against Nüsslein; Koželuh beat Nüsslein in the U.S. Pro and beat Plaa at Beaulieu.
1933	Hans Nüsslein (Weimar Republic); Bill Tilden (USA)	Jack Crawford (AUS)	Rankings: Nüsslein ranked pro No. 1 by: Albert Burke, with Tilden No. 2.; Bill Tilden.; Ray Bowers, with Tilden No. 2 (No. 3 in combined pro/amateur ranking).; Tilden ranked pro No. 1 by Ellsworth Vines, with Cochet No. 2.; Crawford ranked amateur No. 1 by: A. Wallis Myers.; Ellsworth Vines.; Pierre Gillou.; Didier Poulain, L'Auto.; Bernard Brown, Brooklyn Times-Union.; John R. Tunis.; Harry Hopman.; Alfred Chave, The Telegraph (Brisbane).; "Set", The West Australian.; Ray Bowers, with Perry No. 2 (No. 1 in combined pro/amateur ranking).; Year summary Crawford won 13 consecutive amateur tournaments, including the first three majors, the Australian Championships, the French Championships, and Wimbledon, finally losing in five sets to Perry in the 4th, the U.S. Championships.
1934	Hans Nüsslein (Weimar Republic); Ellsworth Vines (USA)	Fred Perry (GBR)	Rankings: Nüsslein ranked pro No. 1 by: John R. Tunis.; Bill Tilden.; Vines ranked pro No. 1 by: Ray Bowers, with Nüsslein No. 2 (No. 2 in combined pro/amateur ranking).; Pierre Gillou, with Tilden No. 2 (No. 1 in combined pro/amateur ranking).; Tennis (Italian newspaper), with Tilden No. 2. (No. 1 in combined pro/amateur ranking).; Perry ranked amateur No. 1 by: A. Wallis Myers.; Pierre Gillou.; J. Brookes Fenno, Jr.; Bill Tilden. (Note: He ranked Von Cramm first on ability.); Harry Hopman.; Ned Potter.; Bernard Brown, Brooklyn Times-Union.; R. O. Cummins, The Courier-Mail.; G. H. McElhone, The Sydney Morning Herald.; John R. Tunis.; Ray Bowers (No. 1 in combined pro/amateur ranking).; Pierre Gillou (No. 2 in combined pro/amateur ranking).; Tennis (Italian newspaper) (No. 3 in combined pro/amateur ranking).; Year summary Perry won three of the four majors; Australian Championships, Wimbledon and the U.S. Championships, Gottfried von Cramm won the French Championships; Vines, aged 22, turned pro; in their initial segment of the World Professional Championship head-to-head tour, Vines defeated Tilden 11 matches to 9; then in a USA-France tour Vines beat Cochet 10–0 and Plaa 8–2; Bowers says that by the end of May, having played somewhat more than 50 matches, Vines led Tilden by 19 wins; Nüsslein beat Vines and Koželuh in the U.S. Pro; Vines beat Nüsslein in the first Wembley Pro and in the Paris Indoor (not to be confused with the French Pro).
1935	Ellsworth Vines (USA)	Fred Perry (GBR)	Rankings: Vines ranked pro No. 1 by: Ray Bowers (co-ranked No. 1 in combined pro/amateur ranking with Perry).; Henri Cochet (No. 1 in combined pro/amateur ranking).; Perry ranked amateur No. 1 by: A. Wallis Myers.; S. Wallis Merrihew.; Pierre Gillou.; Harry Hopman.; Ned Potter.; The Times.; Bunny Austin.; G. H. McElhone, The Sydney Morning Herald.; "Forehand", Ashburton Guardian.; Ray Bowers (co-ranked No. 1 in combined pro/amateur ranking with Vines).; Henri Cochet (No. 3 in combined pro/amateur ranking).; Year summary Perry won Wimbledon and the French Championships; Vines beat Tilden in the Wembley Pro and in the Southport Pro; Vines beat Nüsslein in the French Pro; Vines beat Les Stoefen 25–1 in a World (Pro) Championship head-to-head tour; after Stoefen fell ill, Vines beat Nüsslein in another tour about three-quarters of the time (and also Tilden in their few meetings).
1936	Ellsworth Vines (USA)	Fred Perry (GBR)	Rankings: Vines ranked pro No. 1 by; Fred Perry.; Ray Bowers (No. 2 in combined pro/amateur ranking).; Robert Murray in Sports Illustrated (No. 1 in combined pro/amateur ranking).; L'Auto (No. 1 in combined pro/amateur ranking).; Don Budge (No. 1 in combined pro/amateur ranking).; Bill Tilden (No. 1 in combined pro/amateur ranking).; Perry ranked amateur No. 1 by: A. Wallis Myers.; Harry Hopman.; Pierre Gillou.; Ned Potter.; Jack Crawford.; The Times (London).; G. H. McElhone, The Sydney Morning Herald.; Mervyn Weston, Daily Telegraph (Sydney).; "Austral" (R. M. Kidston), The Referee.; Ray Bowers (No. 1 in combined pro/amateur ranking).; Robert Murray in Sports Illustrated (No. 2 in combined pro/amateur ranking).; L'Auto, with Perry No. 2 (combined pro/amateur ranking).; Don Budge (No. 2 in combined pro/amateur ranking).; Bill Tilden (No. 3 in combined pro/amateur ranking).; Year summary Perry won Wimbledon and the U.S. Championships; in the American tour Vines easily defeated Les Stoefen (finals standings are unknown but on 29 March, Vines led 33–5) and in the Asian tour Vines led Tilden 8–1 at the end of the Japanese part of the tour; Bowers states that a) Vines and Nüsslein never met between the French Pro in 1935 and the Wembley Pro in 1939 and b) Vines didn't enter any tournament from 1936 to 1938 included.
1937	Fred Perry (GBR); Ellsworth Vines (USA)	Don Budge (USA)	Rankings: Perry ranked pro No. 1 by: Ray Bowers (co-ranked No. 1 in combined pro/amateur ranking with Vines and Budge).; Sports Illustrated (No. 2 in combined pro/amateur ranking).; Vines ranked pro No. 1 by: Ray Bowers (co-ranked No. 1 in combined pro/amateur ranking with Perry and Budge).; Pierre Goldschmidt, L'Auto (No. 2 in combined pro/amateur ranking).; Budge ranked amateur No. 1 by: A. Wallis Myers of The Daily Telegraph.; Mervyn Weston, Daily Telegraph (Sydney).; Pierre Gillou.; Ned Potter.; The Times.; Harry Hopman.; Alfred Chave, The Telegraph (Brisbane).; Ray Bowers (co-ranked No. 1 in combined pro/amateur ranking with Vines and Perry).; Pierre Goldschmidt, L'Auto (No. 1 in combined pro/amateur ranking).; Sports Illustrated (No. 1 in combined pro/amateur ranking).; Year summary Budge won Wimbledon and the U.S. Championships, Vines defeated Perry in the World Professional title head-to-head tour 32–29 while Perry won a short British Isles tour 6–3; Perry defeated Tilden 4–3 in America; Vines and Perry didn't enter any tournament.
1938	Ellsworth Vines (USA)	Don Budge (USA)	Rankings: Vines ranked pro No. 1 by Ray Bowers (No. 2 in combined pro/amateur ranking).; Budge ranked amateur No. 1 by: A. Wallis Myers of The Daily Telegraph.; Pierre Gillou.; Ned Potter.; Pierre Goldschmidt, L'Auto.; The Times (London).; F. Gordon Lowe of The Scotsman.; G. H. McElhone of The Sydney Morning Herald.; "International" of The Referee.; Mervyn Weston, Daily Telegraph (Sydney).; Jack Crawford.; Alfred Chave, The Telegraph (Brisbane).; Ray Bowers (No. 1 in combined pro/amateur ranking).; Year summary Budge became the first amateur player to win all four of the majors; in the pros, in the World Professional Championship tour Vines defeated Perry 49–35; Vines still didn't enter any tournament as probably in 1936 and surely in 1937.
1939	Don Budge (USA)	Bobby Riggs (USA)	Rankings: Budge ranked pro No. 1 by: Alfred Chave, The Telegraph (Brisbane).; Ray Bowers (No. 1 in combined pro/amateur ranking).; Didier Poulain of L'Auto (No. 1 in combined pro/amateur ranking).; Riggs ranked amateur No. 1 by: American Lawn Tennis.; F. Gordon Lowe.; Pierre Gillou.; Ned Potter.; The Times.; G. H. McElhone.; Alfred Chave, The Telegraph (Brisbane).; Ray Bowers (No. 5 in combined pro/amateur ranking).; Year summary Budge defeated Vines 22–17 in the World Professional Championship tour and also defeated Perry 28–8; Vines beat Perry, Budge defaulted, in the U.S. Pro; Budge beat Vines and Tilden in the French Pro and beat Nüsslein, Vines, and Tilden in the Wembley Pro; Vines lost to Nüsslein at Southport; Budge, Vines, Tilden, and Stoefen competed in a spring-summer European tour that was mainly a succession of 4-man tournaments; Budge was the winner, in particular beating Vines 15–5.
1940	Don Budge (USA)	N/A	Rankings: Budge ranked pro No. 1 by Ray Bowers, with Perry No. 2 (No. 1 in combined pro/amateur ranking).; Year summary Budge beat Perry in the U.S. Pro.
1941	Fred Perry (GBR)	N/A	Rankings: Perry ranked pro No. 1 by Ray Bowers (co-ranked No. 1 in combined pro/amateur ranking with Riggs).; Year summary Riggs won the U.S. Championships; Perry completely dominated Tilden in a summer tour; Perry won 5 pro tournaments out of 5 including the U.S. Pro over Dick Skeen; Skeen was runner-up to Perry in 4 tournaments.
1942	Don Budge (USA)	N/A	Rankings: Budge ranked pro No. 1 by: USPLTA.; Ray Bowers (No. 1 in combined pro/amateur ranking).; Year summary Riggs and Frank Kovacs turned pro; in matches Budge was the winner, 52–18; Riggs was 36–36, Kovacs 25–26, Perry 23–30, Stoefen 2–28; Kovacs won his first five matches against Budge, but missed one month of play due to arm injury; Perry broke his arm, missed significant time; Budge beat Riggs in U.S. Pro.
1943– 1944	World War II, no world rankings		
1945	N/A	N/A	Rankings: Budge ranked pro No. 1 by Bill Tilden, with Kovacs No. 2, Riggs No. 3.; Kovacs ranked pro No. 1 by WPTA rankings for 1945, issued in March 1945 following the World Pro Championships in San Francisco, with Van Horn and Budge third and Riggs fifth. Budge was reported as out of condition due to military duties.; Van Horn ranked pro No. 1 by USPLTA, in July 1945 rankings following the USPLTA U.S. Pro Championships, with Budge, Riggs, Sabin, Kovacs, Barnes, none of whom played in the U.S. Pro, not ranked due to insufficient data.; Year summary In the pro circuit the business return was slow: Riggs defeated Budge in the biggest pro tournament of the year, the U.S. Pro Hardcourt Championships held at the Los Angeles Tennis Club, missing Kovacs and Van Horn; on 27–30 December Riggs won a second tournament, the Santa Barbara Invitational Pro Tournament, California, defeating Perry; Kovacs defeated Welby Van Horn in the final of the World Professional Tennis Championships (WPTA) in San Francisco in March; in the summer before the soldiers came back to civilian life a 5-meeting series under the Davis Cup format was held between the US Army Air Corps, with Budge (pro) and Parker (amateur), and the US Navy, with Riggs (pro) and Sabin (pro), Riggs overcame Budge 3–2 and amateur Parker 3–2, thus indicating that Riggs was probably the best player in the world in 1945.
1946	Bobby Riggs (USA)	Jack Kramer (USA)	Rankings: Riggs ranked pro No. 1 by PPA Tournament series final points standings with 278 points.; Official PPA rankings.; Kramer ranked amateur No. 1 by: Pierre Gillou.; Harry Hopman.; Ned Potter.; Jean Samazeuilh.; Year summary Riggs defeated Don Budge 24–22 on the Jack Harris World Pro Championship tour (Budge making a recovery from 1–12 down), Tilden and the Professional Players Association organized a series of 31 tournaments with a points system: Riggs won 14 of them, Kovacs 7, Perry 4, Budge 3, Van Horn 2, and Skeen 1. Riggs beat Budge in U.S. Pro Championships at Forest Hills (included in PPA series); Riggs lost to Kovacs in final of Great Lakes Pro Clay Court near Chicago (included in PPA series).
1947	Bobby Riggs (USA)	Jack Kramer (USA)	Rankings; Arriving at a number one pro ranking for 1947 is difficult, because in the pro ranks there was no long annual tour and Riggs, Budge and Kovacs all achieved significant wins.: Riggs ranked pro No. 1 by; Peter Underwood in 2019.; Courier-Post (Camden, N. J.) on 15 January 1948, which said Riggs was the "top professional player last year".; Kramer ranked amateur No. 1 by: John Olliff.; Pierre Gillou.; Ned Potter.; Year summary Tilden was imprisoned for sexual offenses and his series of tournaments fell apart; Riggs organized a head-to-head USA Pro Challenge tour between Riggs and Kovacs. Riggs lost the tour to Kovacs 6 matches to 5, the deciding match a best-of-five sets final after a tie at 5 to 5, played in September. (Note: See:) Riggs and Kovacs in head-to-head matches were 7–7. Kramer won 8 of 9 amateur tournaments and 48 of 49 matches (among them his two singles in the Challenge Round of the Davis Cup); Riggs beat Don Budge both in U.S. Pro Championships at Forest Hills and in U.S. Pro Indoor. Budge won a European tour against Riggs. In December 1947, in the first few matches of their world pro championship tour, Riggs held a 2–1 edge in play against Kramer and continued to lead into 3–1 January and 8–5.
1948	Jack Kramer (USA)	Pancho Gonzales (USA); Frank Parker (USA)	Rankings: Kramer ranked pro No. 1 by; USPLTA (U.S.-only ranking).; USPTA (U.S.-only ranking).; Bob Phillips, Birmingham Post-Herald.; Los Angeles Times in 2009 (combined pro/amateur ranking for 1946–1953 period).; Ray Bowers in 2010 (combined pro/amateur ranking for 1948–1953 period).; Peter Underwood in 2019 (combined pro/amateur ranking for 1948–1953 period).; Gonzales ranked amateur No. 1 by Ned Potter, with Parker No. 2.; Parker ranked amateur No. 1 by: John Olliff.; Pierre Gillou.; Year summary Kramer defeated Riggs 69–20 on the World Pro Championship head-to-head tour after trailing Riggs 5–8 and then equalizing at 14–14; in the preliminary matches Dinny Pails beat Pancho Segura 41–31 according to Kramer; Kramer beat Riggs in U.S. Pro Championships at Forest Hills the most important pro tournament by far this year; then the 4 touring men played a short tour in South America in July on slow courts enabling Riggs to win his fair share of matches against Kramer (according to Pails in his book Set Points); Kramer ended the year by winning the Australian Pro tour in September–November, with the incomplete standings being as follows: Kramer 19–4 (1 match unfinished), Segura 14–9 (1 unfinished), Riggs 7–17, Pails 6–16 (2 unfinished).
1949	Jack Kramer (USA); Bobby Riggs (USA)	Pancho Gonzales (USA); Ted Schroeder (USA)	Rankings: Kramer ranked pro No. 1 by: Bob Phillips, Birmingham Post-Herald.; Los Angeles Times in 2009 (combined pro/amateur ranking for the 1946–1953 period).; Ray Bowers in 2010 (combined pro/amateur ranking from for the 1948–1953 period).; Peter Underwood in 2019 (combined pro/amateur ranking for the 1948–1953 period).; Riggs ranked pro No. 1 by USPLTA, Kramer not ranked (U.S.-only ranking).; Gonzales ranked amateur No. 1 by: John Olliff.; Ned Potter.; Schroeder ranked amateur No. 1 by: Pierre Gillou.; Harry Hopman.; Year summary In the pro circuit Kramer won the Wembley Pro over Riggs and Scarborough Pro over Budge; Riggs won the U.S. Pro Championships at Forest Hills over Budge, Kramer did not play; in the amateur circuit Gonzales won the U.S. Championships; then Gonzales played his first pro match against Kramer on 25 October on the head-to-head World Pro Championship tour (ended on 21 May 1950): at the end of November Kramer still led 22–4.
1950	Jack Kramer (USA); Pancho Segura (ECU)	Budge Patty (USA); Frank Sedgman (AUS)	Rankings: Kramer ranked pro No. 1 by: Bob Phillips, Birmingham Post-Herald.; Los Angeles Times in 2009 (combined pro/amateur ranking for the 1946–1953 period).; Ray Bowers in 2010 (combined pro/amateur ranking for the 1948–1953 period).; Peter Underwood in 2019 (combined pro/amateur ranking for the 1948–1953 period).; Segura ranked pro No. 1 by: USPLTA, with Kramer No. 2 (U.S.-only ranking).; PTPA (Professional Tennis Players Association) (U.S.-only ranking).; Patty ranked amateur No. 1 by: John Olliff.; Pierre Gillou.; Sedgman ranked amateur No. 1 by: Harry Hopman.; Ned Potter.; Year summary Kramer finished beating Gonzales on the World Pro Championship head-to-head tour ended on 21 May (begun on 25 October 1949) 96–27 (97–26 according to Kramer himself); Segura beat Frank Parker "comfortably" in the head-to-head preliminary matches; Kramer dominated Segura in the next World Pro Championship tour which began on 26 October (finished in March 1951): mid-November Kramer led 10–4; in tournaments Segura beat Kramer in Paris and once again in the semifinals of the Cleveland U.S. Pro Championships (approved by USPLTA) before overcoming Kovacs in the final; Gonzales defeated Kramer at Philadelphia U.S. Pro Indoor final; Gonzales won at Wembley.
1951	Frank Kovacs (USA); Jack Kramer (USA); Pancho Segura (ECU)	Frank Sedgman (AUS)	Rankings: Kovacs ranked pro No. 1 in July by the PTPA (Professional Tennis Players Association), with Segura No. 2 (U.S.-only ranking).; Kramer ranked pro No. 1 by: Bob Phillips, Birmingham Post-Herald.; Los Angeles Times in 2009 (combined pro/amateur ranking for the 1946–1953 period).; Ray Bowers in 2010 (combined pro/amateur ranking for the 1948–1953 period).; Peter Underwood in 2019 (combined pro/amateur ranking for the 1948–1953 period).; Segura ranked pro No. 1 by the USPLTA, with Gonzales No. 2, "Kramer not ranked due to insufficient data" (U.S.-only ranking). Kramer had withdrawn from the U.S. Pro at Forest Hills and did not play in the Cleveland tournament.; Sedgman ranked amateur No. 1 by: Pierre Gillou.; Harry Hopman.; Ned Potter.; Year summary Kramer finally defeated Segura 64–28 on the World Pro Championship head-to-head tour finished in March (begun on 28 October 1950); Kramer beat Segura and Gonzales in Philadelphia Pro; Kovacs defeated Earn in final of U.S. Pro Clay Court Championships; Kovacs beat Segura on cement in a close final at Cleveland U.S. Pro (according to PTPA) or Cleveland International Pro (billed title); Segura beat Gonzales in U.S. Pro Championships at Forest Hills (authorized by USPLTA); Kramer and Riggs did not play in the Cleveland U.S. Pro. Kovacs did not play Forest Hills U.S. Pro. Segura lost to Gonzales in final of Wembley Pro.
1952	Pancho Gonzales (USA); Jack Kramer (USA); Pancho Segura (ECU)	Frank Sedgman (AUS)	Rankings: Gonzales ranked No. 1 in his International Tennis Hall of Fame profile, which states that he "rose to the world No. 1 ranking" in 1952, and categorized him as "Top ranking: World number 1 (1952)".; Kramer ranked pro No. 1 by: Los Angeles Times in 2009 (combined pro/amateur ranking for the 1946–1953 period).; Ray Bowers in 2010 (combined pro/amateur ranking for the 1948–1953 period).; Peter Underwood in 2019 (combined pro/amateur ranking for the 1948–1953 period).; Segura ranked pro No. 1 by: USPLTA (U.S.-only ranking).; PTPA (Professional Tennis Players Association), with Gonzales No. 2 (U.S.-only ranking).; Sedgman ranked amateur No. 1 by: Lance Tingay.; Pierre Gillou.; Harry Hopman.; Ned Potter.; Year summary In his book McCauley has traced only 9 tournaments and a small US tour, among these 9 tournaments 2 seemed to be domestic Nationals (British Pro and German Pro) so there left 7 tournaments for the leading pros. Segura entered the 7 and Gonzales played 5 of them and won 4 and reached 1 final. Moreover, Gonzales defeated Segura 5 times out of 7 (including some tour matches in Paris in June). Gonzales defeated Segura and Kramer and lost one match to Kovacs in Philadelphia Pro. Gonzales defeated Segura and Kramer to win Wembley Pro; Segura overcame Gonzales in U.S. Pro Championships (according to PTPA) or Cleveland International Pro (billed title) and in a tournament at Roland Garros, where Segura won the event. Sedgman won Wimbledon and the U.S. Championship.
1953	Pancho Gonzales (USA); Jack Kramer (USA); Frank Sedgman (AUS)	Lew Hoad (AUS); Tony Trabert (USA)	Rankings: Gonzales ranked pro No. 1 by: Ken McGregor in October before Wembley, with Kramer second, Segura third, Sedgman fourth.; The Players Committee of Jack March's Cleveland U. S. Pro or "World's Professional Championship" tournament in June, with Segura second.; George Lyttleton Rogers.; Kramer ranked pro No. 1 by: Bob Phillips, Birmingham Post-Herald.; Los Angeles Times in 2009 (combined pro/amateur ranking for the 1946–1953 period).; Frank Sedgman in October.; The Sacramento Bee, 2 January 1954, described as "professional tennis' No. 1 player".; Ray Bowers in 2010 (combined pro/amateur ranking for the 1948–1953 period).; Peter Underwood in 2019 (combined pro/amateur ranking for the 1948–1953 period).; Sedgman ranked pro No. 1 by the editors of Tennis de France.; Hoad ranked amateur No. 1 by: The editors of Tennis de France.; Harry Hopman.; Noel Brown in World Tennis.; Trabert ranked amateur No. 1 by: Lance Tingay in September.; Ned Potter in World Tennis.; Bill Talbert in World Tennis.; Hal Burrows in World Tennis.; Grant Golden in November in World Tennis.; Ham Richardson in November in World Tennis.; Gardnar Mulloy in November in World Tennis.; Year summary Kramer retired on 9 July and never met Gonzales that year and Gonzales met Segura and Sedgman for the first time of the year only in November. Kramer defeated Sedgman 54–41 on the World Pro Championship head-to-head tour, Sedgman's results declining after a shoulder injury; during tour breaks these four men played three 4-man tournaments with Kramer winning two of them, the results included in the Kramer/Sedgman head-to-head tour; Kramer's whole 1953 record was 56–41 to Sedgman and 1–1 to Segura; Sedgman beat Gonzales in Wembley Pro, in Paris and in Geneva but the Australian trailed Segura 3–7 in head-to-head meetings. Kramer, Sedgman, and Segura did not participate in the Cleveland U.S. Pro Championships or Cleveland World Pro (billed title). Kramer ended his season in early July, and retired from the world tours.
1954	Pancho Gonzales (USA)	Jaroslav Drobný (EGY); Vic Seixas (USA); Tony Trabert (USA)	Rankings: Gonzales ranked pro No. 1 by: International Professional Tennis Association for 1954 season.; Harry Hopman in October.; Drobný ranked amateur No. 1 by: Lance Tingay.; Jean Samazeuilh.; Seixas ranked No. 1 by Harry Hopman, with Drobný No. 2.; Trabert ranked amateur No. 1 by: Ned Potter in World Tennis.; A panel of 8 experts in The New York Times.; Andrew Bozon.; Year summary In 1953–1954 there was only one Australian tour during these two years in November–December 1954 and Gonzales won it (16–9 to Sedgman; 4–2 to Segura; 15–0 to McGregor); Gonzales also won the North American tour (3 January – 30 May), a succession of 70 tournaments, all but one being 4-man events. On 2 June a report stated that Gonzales won 29 tournaments and had an 85–40 win–loss. In head-to-head meetings the results are not certain: Gonzales win–loss record against Segura was about 30–21 (or 30–20) and was possibly exactly equal against Sedgman, 30–21 (or 30–20) too. In a 1975 article in the L.A. Times, this tour was referenced as a world championship title for Gonzales. In tournaments Gonzales defeated Segura in Kramer's L.A. U.S. Pro (with the USPLTA Benrus Cup) and Sedgman in Cleveland U.S. Pro or Cleveland World Pro (billed title); Wembley Indoor Pro and French Pro not held. Drobný won the Wimbledon Championships, defeating Rosewall in a four-set final.
1955	Pancho Gonzales (USA)	Tony Trabert (USA)	Rankings: Gonzales ranked pro No. 1 by: International Professional Tennis Association for 1955 season.; Lawn Tennis and Badminton.; Trabert ranked amateur No. 1 by: Lance Tingay.; Ned Potter.; Year summary Gonzales-Trabert head-to-head World Professional Championship tour began in December, primarily on portable indoor canvas, and Gonzales led Trabert from the beginning; Gonzales dominated the pros beating Segura in U.S. Pro Championships or Cleveland World Pro (billed title); Wembley and French Pro not held; Sedgman played very little in 1955 and underwent surgery for appendicitis.
1956	Pancho Gonzales (USA)	Lew Hoad (AUS)	Rankings: Gonzales ranked pro No. 1 by Jack March, promoter of the Cleveland tournament, for the 1956 season.; Hoad ranked amateur No. 1 by: Lance Tingay.; Ned Potter.; The editors of Tennis de France.; Year summary World Professional Championship head-to-head tour, played mostly indoor on portable canvas, Gonzales defeated Trabert 74–27; Gonzales beat Segura in U.S. Pro or Cleveland World Pro (billed title); Gonzales beat Sedgman both in the round-robin inaugural L. A. Masters and in Wembley Pro; Gonzales lost to Trabert in final of French Pro. Sedgman missed the first five and a half months of 1956. Sedgman won round robin tournaments in December at Brisbane and Kooyong against Trabert, Segura, and Hartwig. Trabert won a South American tour against Gonzales 6 matches to 3, and led Gonzales in outdoor matches 16 to 11 on the year. Hoad won 16 amateur tournaments and 88% of his matches.
1957	Pancho Gonzales (USA)	Ashley Cooper (AUS)	Rankings: Gonzales ranked pro No. 1 by: Jack March for the 1957 season.; The Montana Standard, 28 January 1958, described as "the world's top professional tennis player".; Adrian Quist (No. 1 in combined pro/amateur ranking).; Cooper ranked amateur No. 1 by: Lance Tingay.; Ned Potter.; Yvon Petra.; Adrian Quist (No. 6 in combined pro/amateur ranking).; Year summary Gonzales defeated Rosewall 50–26 in the World Professional Championship head-to-head tour, Segura defeated Dinny Pails 51–8 in the head-to-head preliminary matches; Rosewall won a South African tour over Hoad, Kramer and Segura and an Australian tour over Hoad, Sedgman and Segura; Gonzales lost to Segura in Sydney Tournament of Champions; Gonzales beat Segura in U.S. Pro or Cleveland World Pro (billed title); Gonzales also won the Forest Hills Tournament of Champions and the Masters Round Robin Pro in Los Angeles; Rosewall beat Segura in Wembley Pro.
1958	Pancho Gonzales (USA)	Ashley Cooper (AUS)	Rankings: Gonzales ranked pro No. 1 by: Jack March for the 1958 season.; Jack Kramer in his pro rankings for 1958.; Cooper ranked amateur No. 1 by: Lance Tingay.; Ned Potter.; Year summary Gonzales defeated Hoad 51–36 in the World Professional Championship tour; Gonzales beat Rosewall in the deciding match of Forest Hills Pro Tournament of Champions; Gonzales beat Hoad in U.S. Pro or Cleveland World Pro (billed title); Hoad won the Australian subtour over Gonzales 8–5; Hoad beat Sedgman and Gonzales in deciding matches to win the Kooyong Tournament of Champions; Hoad beat Gonzales in Sydney Masters and in the round-robin at Forest Hills Tournament of Champions; Hoad beat Trabert and Gonzales before losing to Rosewall at French Pro at Roland Garros.
1959	Pancho Gonzales (USA); Lew Hoad (AUS)	Neale Fraser (AUS)	Rankings: Gonzales ranked pro No. 1 by: Jack March for the 1959 season, with Hoad second, Segura third, Trabert fourth, and Rosewall fifth.; Frank Sedgman in a conversation in World Tennis, with Hoad second, and Rosewall third.; Jack Kramer in his personal pro ranking (which differed from Kramer's Ampol point ranking), with Sedgman second, Rosewall third and Hoad fourth.; Robert Roy in L'Équipe (pro-amateur combined ranking), as of 17 December, with Sedgman second, Rosewall third, Trabert fourth, and Hoad fifth.; Hoad ranked pro No. 1 by: Ampol point rankings (51 points), Gonzales second (43 points), Rosewall third (41 points), Sedgman fourth (32 points) and Trabert fifth (25 points). Recalled by Mal Anderson in a conversation in World Tennis, ("Kramer established a point system to decide the best players...Lew finished ahead of Pancho.").; Robert Barnes (Kramer's Australian manager), with Gonzales second, Rosewall third, and Sedgman fourth.; Sydney Morning Herald on 10 January 1960, which described that he had won "the title of world's top professional tennis player".; Fraser ranked amateur No. 1 by: Ned Potter.; Lance Tingay.; Year summary North American 4-man World Pro Championship tour, decided on the basis of money won, results: Gonzales 47–15, Hoad 42–20, Ashley Cooper 21–40, Mal Anderson 13–48; Hoad, however, defeated Gonzales 15–13 on the tour; Kramer's office stated Hoad led Gonzales 24 to 23 in matches against each other on the year. Hoad won the 12-player field Ampol Open Trophy in a 15 tournament series with a point system. Hoad beat Gonzales and Rosewall to win the Forest Hills Tournament of Champions; Hoad beat Gonzales to win at Memphis (not included in Ampol series), at Perth in November and at Memorial Drive stadium in Adelaide in December; Hoad also won earlier tournaments at Perth and at Norwood Cricket Oval in Adelaide; Hoad won the final event, Qantas Kooyong in Dec./Jan. 1960. Gonzales beat Hoad at Melbourne Olympic Velodrome in January, at Sydney Marks Athletic Field, in the L.A. Masters, in U.S. Pro or Cleveland World Pro (billed title) (not included in the Ampol series), and at White City Tournament of Champions; Hoad was 3 to 5 against Gonzales in the Ampol series. (Note: L'Impartial on 6 January 1960 declared Hoad "world champion" and winner of "the world title" following Ampol Open Trophy win; Australian sources stated Hoad was "world tournament champion"., and referred to the Ampol series as "the world's open tennis championship" and also as "the world series". Sydney Morning Herald on 10 January 1960 stated that Hoad had won "the title of world's top professional tennis player". In an advertisement in World Tennis magazine in June 1960, Hoad was described as "world champion Lew Hoad". Kramer's brochure described the Ampol series as "World Championship Tennis" and "the world series". There had also been news reports from January to April 1960 of Gonzales being the defending world champion or winning a "world series". On 10 January 1960, The Philadelphia Inquirer called Pancho Gonzales "world professional tennis champion". On 15 January 1960, Lawn Tennis and Badminton said Hoad was taking a six month rest and the article stated "J. Kramer is urging Hoad not to take this step, as during this year he will have his best chance of taking R. A. Gonzales' world professional title from him". On 24 January 1960, Gonzales was billed as "World Pro Champion" in The Boston Globe. On 29 January 1960, the Los Angeles Times said "Gonzales goes after an unprecedented sixth straight world crown". In April 1960, near the conclusion of the 4-man pro tour of the following year, some newspaper reports described Pancho Gonzales as "world professional tennis champion since 1954". Gonzales was described as the "titleholder" of the "World Professional Tennis Championship" in The Age on 12 April 1960.)
1960	Pancho Gonzales (USA); Ken Rosewall (AUS)	Neale Fraser (AUS)	Rankings: Gonzales ranked pro No. 1 by: Robert Geist (co-ranked with Rosewall).; Jack Kramer in his personal pro ranking, with Sedgman No. 2.; Valley News, 15 January 1961, with Hoad No. 2.; The Times (San Mateo) on 20 January 1961, described as "still rank[ing] as the No. 1 tennis pro".; Rosewall ranked pro No. 1 by Robert Geist (co-ranked with Gonzales).; Fraser ranked amateur No. 1 by: Lance Tingay.; Ned Potter.; Year summary World Series 4-man matches for the World Pro Championship among 4 players: Gonzales 49–8, Rosewall 32–25, Segura 22–28, Alex Olmedo 11–44; just after this, Gonzales won a minor tournament and then retired for a short time; Rosewall beat Segura in Wembley Pro; Rosewall beat Hoad in French Pro at Roland Garros; Rosewall won 7 tournaments in the 1960 series and beat Hoad 4 to 3 in tournament finals (although this tally does not include the Kooyong final in January won by Hoad, which concluded the previous tournament series). Rosewall was defeated by Gonzales 20 to 5 in matches on the season. Gonzales and Hoad did not play against each other in 1960. According to Pacific Stars and Stripes (Nov. 1960), Kramer kept a points system for tournaments, with no apparent bonus prize award. Gonzales had withdrawn in May, just before the first tournament of the series in Melbourne. Hoad withdrew with back trouble following marathon final at Tokyo Japanese Pro in November. Rosewall was leading in points until Tokyo Japanese Pro, with Hoad No. 2, although Rosewall lost to Hoad in Tokyo, the lead then was uncertain. Final tournament in Australia was not played. Final results of tournament point series unknown.
1961	Pancho Gonzales (USA); Ken Rosewall (AUS)	Roy Emerson (AUS); Rod Laver (AUS)	Rankings: Gonzales ranked pro No. 1 by: World Series ranking results where he was the official world No. 1, Rosewall (did not play) and Hoad (withdrew with an injury) were not officially ranked.; Joe McCauley, whose 1961 chapter is entitled Gonzales Still World Champion but says in the text that Rosewall had a good claim to being No. 1.; The Miami Herald on 28 December 1961 (syndicated in other newspapers).; Rosewall ranked pro No. 1 by: L'Équipe, with Gonzales No. 2 (No. 2 in combined pro/amateur ranking).; Tennis de France.; Robert Geist.; 1962 Yearbook of the USPLTA.; Time magazine article from May 1965.; Emerson ranked amateur No. 1 by Ned Potter.; Laver ranked amateur No. 1 by: Lance Tingay.; L'Équipe, with Emerson No. 2 (No. 11 in combined pro/amateur ranking).; Year summary There were 47 World Series one-set matches for the world championship among 6 players, followed by 28 head-to-head one-set matches between the top 1 & 2 and 3 & 4 to determine the final champion and an official ranking for the contract pros. Rosewall, however, opted not to play in the World Series, and Hoad withdrew from the tour due to injury. Substitutions were permitted for injured players in the round robin: Gonzales-(sub. Segura) 33–14. No. 1 Gonzales then defeated No. 2 Gimeno 21–7. In tournaments, Rosewall beat Hoad (Gonzales lost to Hoad in semi-final) in Wembley Pro; Rosewall beat Gonzales in French Pro at Roland Garros; Gonzales beat Sedgman in a depleted U.S. Pro or Cleveland World Pro (billed title), Rosewall and Hoad did not play. Rosewall beat Gonzales in a 7-match tour of France, mostly on clay; Gonzales lost to Hoad in a 10-match tour of the British Isles, largely on grass. In late October Gonzales retired once again (for 20 months).
1962	Ken Rosewall (AUS)	Rod Laver (AUS)	Rankings: Rosewall ranked pro No. 1 by: Robert Geist.; Time magazine in an article from May 1965.; The Canberra Times of 7 January 1963, which stated Rosewall was the world's "top" professional tennis player.; Laver ranked amateur No. 1 by: Lance Tingay.; Ned Potter.; Ulrich Kaiser, from a panel of 13 experts (unanimous).; Ken Rosewall (No. 4 in combined pro/amateur ranking).; Year summary No official pro championship tour or point tour (apart from Trofeo Facis, a point tour), very little tennis from late March to late July; Rosewall won 10 pro tournaments including Wembley over Hoad and French Pro at Roland Garros over Gimno. Rosewall beat Hoad in the Kooyong final; Hoad beat Rosewall in the Adelaide Pro, Hoad won the Trofeo Facis tour of Italy (Rosewall third place), Hoad won the Zurich tournament (Rosewall lost to Segura in semifinal); Hoad won a 5-match tour of Britain against Trabert 4 to 1.
1963	Ken Rosewall (AUS)	Chuck McKinley (USA); Rafael Osuna (MEX)	Rankings: Rosewall ranked pro No. 1 by: The IPTPA World Championship Tour.; The International Professional Tennis Players Association in a vote.; Robert Geist.; The Honolulu Advertiser on 5 January 1964, when he was described as having the mantle of "world's top tennis player".; Time magazine in an article from May 1965.; McKinley ranked amateur No. 1 by: Ned Potter, with Emerson No. 2.; Ulrich Kaiser, from a panel of 13 experts.; Osuna ranked amateur No. 1 by Lance Tingay.; Year summary In the Australia and New Zealand Tour, Rosewall dominated the new pro recruit Rod Laver, 11 victories to 2 in matches in Australia and New Zealand, although they were 2 to 2 in best-of-five set matches (Laver winning at Kooyong and Adelaide), and Laver lost to Hoad 8 to 0; then the World Championship Series was held in the US with six players, two U.S. players, Buchholz and MacKay, one Spaniard Gimeno, one Chilean Ayala and only two Australians Rosewall and Laver. In the first phase Rosewall ended first (31 wins – 10 losses) ahead Laver (26- 16). In the second (and final) phase Rosewall won the tour, beating Laver 14–4. Then Rosewall captured five tournaments including the three majors of that year and Laver reached the finals of two majors and also won five tournaments; Rosewall defeated Laver in U.S. Pro at Forest Hills; Rosewall defeated Laver in French Pro at Stade Coubertin; Rosewall defeated Hoad in Wembley Pro; Rosewall lost to Hoad in final of televised series; Rosewall lost to Hoad in Tokyo Japanese Pro; Laver won the Trofeo Facis tour of Italy.
1964	Rod Laver (AUS); Ken Rosewall (AUS)	Roy Emerson (AUS)	Rankings: Laver ranked pro No. 1 by: Robert Geist (co-ranked with Rosewall).; Tennis Australia in partnership with the Australian Sports Commission (co-ranked with Rosewall).; Australia Day Honours List website.; International Tennis Hall of Fame profile.; Raymond Lee.; The New York Times in article by John Clarke on 19 September 2018.; Justine Cohen in World Tennis magazine.; Official Australian government gallery portrait.; Rosewall ranked pro No. 1 by: The Johannesburg Star after South African challenge match win over Laver.; Butch Buchholz, writing in World Tennis (going with the official No. 1 based on the pro tournament point ranking system); Rod Laver, who is quoted after the Wembley Pro final: "I've still plenty of ambitions left and would like to be the World's No. 1. Despite this win, I am not there yet – Ken is. I may have beaten him more often than he has beaten me this year but he has won the biggest tournaments except here. I've lost to other people but Ken hasn't. We are working on a points system which is the soundest way so that everyone has to try hard all the time and Ken has the most points".; Joe McCauley's 1964 chapter entitled: Rosewall Tops Again But Only Just.; Norris McWhirter in The Observer in December 1964 (No. 1 in combined pro/amateur ranking).; British Lawn Tennis magazine.; Time magazine in May 1965 article.; Michel Sutter.; Tennis Australia in partnership with the Australian Sports Commission (co-ranked with Laver).; Robert Geist (co-ranked with Laver).; Emerson ranked amateur No. 1 by: Lance Tingay.; Ned Potter.; Ulrich Kaiser, from a panel of 14 experts (unanimous).; Norris McWhirter, The Observer (No. 6 in combined pro/amateur ranking).; Year summary The pros established a ranking system based on points awarded at 19 tournaments (7 points for the winner, 4 for the runner-up, 3 for 3rd place, 2 for 4th and 1 for each quarter-finalist); the final official positions were: 1) Rosewall, 2) Laver. Laver beat Rosewall and Gonzales in U.S. Pro at Longwood; Rosewall beat Laver in French Pro at Stad Coubertin; Laver beat Rosewall in Wembley Pro. Rosewall won 11 tournaments in all and finished first in the Trofeo Facis tour of Italy and in the European Cup tour. Laver won 12 tournaments in all and won a tour of Queensland over Hoad. However, Laver, Rosewall, and Anderson finished behind Hoad in a 4-man 16-day 24-match New Zealand tour (Laver tied Hoad at 7 wins, 5 losses, but lost his series with Hoad 1 to 3 and finished No. 2). Rosewall, Laver, Hoad, and Anderson lost to Gonzales in the U.S. Pro Indoor at White Plains, N.Y., the final against Rosewall a long five-set match. In all known matches throughout the year, Laver beat Rosewall 17–7. Rosewall won a World champion Challenge match against Laver in Johannesburg at the end of October.
1965	Rod Laver (AUS)	Roy Emerson (AUS); Manolo Santana (ESP)	Rankings: Laver ranked pro No. 1 by the official pros' point ranking system.; Emerson ranked amateur No. 1 by: Lance Tingay.; Ulrich Kaiser, from a panel of 16 experts.; Joseph McCauley, in a letter in World Tennis.; Sport za Rubezhom.; Santana ranked amateur No. 1 by Ned Potter.; Year summary Though Rosewall won 2 of the 3 most important tournaments, Laver was the new undisputed king of tennis. Laver won 21 tournaments in all (to Rosewall's 7). Rosewall beat Laver in U.S. Pro at Longwood; Rosewall beat Laver in French Pro at Stad Coubertin; Laver beat Gimeno in Wembley Pro; Laver beat Rosewall 16–7 in head-to-head matches. Rosewall and Laver both lost to Gonzales in the richest tournament of the year, the CBS Dallas, played on clay with a $25,000 total purse.
1966	Rod Laver (AUS)	Manolo Santana (ESP); Fred Stolle (AUS)	Rankings: Laver ranked pro No. 1 by the official pros' point ranking system.; Santana ranked amateur No. 1 by: Lance Tingay.; Pierre de Thier.; Sport In The USSR; Stolle ranked amateur No. 1 by Joseph McCauley, World Tennis, with Santana No. 2.; Year summary This was the year of the greatest rivalry between Laver and Rosewall; they shared all the important tournaments, with Laver slightly ahead: in the world circuit played by the leading pros, Laver won 15 tournaments including Forest Hills Pro, the U.S. Pro at Longwood and Wembley Pro over Rosewall runner-up the three times, Rosewall won nine tournaments including Madison Square Garden Pro and the French Pro at Stad Coubertin over ... Laver finalist both times; Laver and Rosewall were tied 7–7 in head-to-head matches.
1967	Rod Laver (AUS)	John Newcombe (AUS)	Rankings: Laver ranked pro No. 1 by: The official pros' point ranking system.; Daily Mirror in December 1967 (combined pro/amateur ranking), described as "world's No. 1".; Newcombe ranked amateur No. 1 by: Lance Tingay.; Joseph McCauley, World Tennis.; Martini and Rossi's point system.; Ulrich Kaiser, from a panel of 13 experts.; Year summary Laver probably was at the peak of his whole career, at least on fast courts, winning 19 tournaments including all the most important events: the Madison Square Garden Pro, the U.S. Pro at Longwood, Wimbledon Pro, the French Pro at Stad Coubertin and Wembley Pro; Rosewall stayed the No. 2 in the world capturing seven tournaments and reaching three important finals in Madison Square Garden Pro, Wimbledon Pro and Wembley Pro; in head-to-head matches Laver beat Rosewall 8–5 and Gimeno 12–4, Rosewall and Gimeno were equal, 7–7.

==== Open Era ====
Professional players were allowed to compete with amateurs in one unified tour starting 1968 (all players in the Open Era are professional unless otherwise indicated).

Year	No. 1 player	Sources of ranking and tournament results summary
1968	Rod Laver (AUS)	Rankings: Laver ranked No. 1 by: Panel of journalists for the 'Martini and Rossi' Award.; Panel of 15 journalists (unanimous).; Ulrich Kaiser, from a panel of 18 experts (unanimous).; Joseph McCauley, World Tennis.; Lance Tingay.; Rino Tommasi.; Bud Collins.; The Times.; Year summary The Open Era began in April and at least 10 open tournaments were played with professionals winning 8 and amateurs 2 with the pros leading in matches won 199 to 45. Most pros played either the National Tennis League or World Championship Tennis circuits, so only 3 tournaments featured all the best players: 1) Wimbledon, where Rod Laver defeated Tony Roche in the finals, after they beat Arthur Ashe, an amateur, and Ken Rosewall in the semi-finals; 2) the Pacific Southwest Open, where Laver defeated Rosewall, who defeated Ashe in the SFs; and 3) the US Open, where Ashe defeated Tom Okker, a "national registered" professional (Okker was awarded the first prize money at the US Open), with Laver losing in the 4th round. In major pro events with both NTL and WCT players, Laver won both the U.S. Pro at Longwood and the last-ever French Pro at Roland Garros, both over Newcombe. Overall, Laver won 13 titles, although 5 of his wins were in 4-man invitationals; his wins included 7 of the 11 NTL tournaments and he was 1–0 vs. Ashe and 5–2 vs. Rosewall. Ashe won 10 tournaments, including the U.S. Amateur Championships, and 8 other amateur titles and was 11–1 in the Davis Cup, which allowed only amateurs and national registered professionals to participate.
1969	Rod Laver (AUS)	Rankings: Laver ranked No. 1 by: Panel of 13 international journalists for the 'Martini and Rossi' Award.; Lance Tingay.; Bud Collins.; Rino Tommasi.; Joseph McCauley, World Tennis.; Frank Rostron, Daily Express.; Year summary Rod Laver won the Grand Slam: At Wimbledon Laver beat John Newcombe, who defeated Tony Roche in the SFs; at the US Open Laver defeated Roche; at the French Open, Laver beat Ken Rosewall, after they beat Okker and Roche in the semifinals (7 of the top 10 players played); and, at the Australian Open Laver defeated Roche in the SFs (7 of top 10 played). Of the 8 tournaments with at least 6 of the top 10 players participating, Laver won 4 (he played all 8), including: the U.S. Pro Indoor and the Wembley Pro, both over Roche; South Africa over Okker; and the U.S. Pro over Newcombe; while among the other 4 events, Roche won Sydney over Laver. Laver won 18 tournaments, including 6 of the 9 National Tennis League events, for a 106–16 record and was 3–0 vs Okker, 2–1 vs Newcombe but only 4–5 vs Roche. Roche won 5 titles with 5 runner-ups with a 63–13 record (Note: Match records for players other than Laver are from the ATP website.)
1970	Rod Laver (AUS); John Newcombe (AUS); Ken Rosewall (AUS)	Rankings: Laver ranked No. 1 by: Robert Geist (co-ranked with Newcombe and Rosewall).; Panel of 12 journalists which made the WCT draw for 1971, with Rosewall No. 2.; Rex Bellamy, with Rosewall No. 2.; John Newcombe.; Newcombe ranked No. 1 by: Robert Geist (co-ranked with Laver and Rosewall).; Lance Tingay, with Rosewall and Laver No. 2.; Joseph McCauley, World Tennis, with Rosewall No. 2.; Bud Collins, with Rosewall and Laver No. 2.; Mike Gibson (Wimbledon referee).; Tennis magazine (Germany).; Rosewall ranked No. 1 by: Robert Geist (co-ranked with Laver and Newcombe).; Panel of 10 international journalists for the 'Martini and Rossi' Award, with 97 points (out of 100), with Laver No. 2 (89 pts).; Rino Tommasi, with Newcombe No. 2.; Judith Elian, with Newcombe No. 2.; Year summary Newcombe won Wimbledon final over Rosewall, the strongest and largest draw field that year; Rosewall won the US Open over Newcombe and Roche (SFs) (Rod Laver lost 4th round at both). Of the 5 other tournaments with 8 of the top 10 players playing, Laver won 4: the WCT U.S. Pro Indoor over Roche; the WCT Dunlop Sydney Open over Rosewall; the Grand Prix Pacific Southwest Open over Newcombe; and the Grand Prix Wembley Pro. In the 5th, the U.S. Pro (joint Grand Prix-WCT), Roche beat Laver. Of the next 9 events with 4 or more of the top 10 players, Laver won 2 of the 5 he entered. In total, Laver won 12 ATP events, plus the Tennis Champions Classic, a series of two-player events, defeating Rosewall in the final, and 2 other invitational events. He was 84–14 including 5–0 vs. Rosewall, 3–0 vs. Newcombe, and 1–2 vs. Roche.
1971	John Newcombe (AUS); Ken Rosewall (AUS); Stan Smith (USA)	Rankings: Newcombe ranked No. 1 by: Judith Elian (co-ranked with Smith).; The 'Martini and Rossi' Award, voted for by 11 journalists, with 96 out of 110 points (co-ranked with Smith).; Robert Geist (co-ranked with Rosewall and Smith).; Lance Tingay, with Smith No. 2.; Bud Collins, with Smith No. 2.; Joseph McCauley, World Tennis, with Smith No. 2.; Rex Bellamy, with Smith No. 2.; Frank Rostron (co-ranked with Newcombe).; Rosewall ranked No. 1 by: Rino Tommasi, with Laver No. 2.; Robert Geist (co-ranked with Newcombe and Smith).; Smith ranked No. 1 by: The 'Martini and Rossi' Award, voted for by 11 journalists, with 96 out of 110 points (co-ranked with Newcombe).; Judith Elian (co-ranked with Newcombe).; Robert Geist (co-ranked with Newcombe and Rosewall).; Frank Rostron (co-ranked with Newcombe).; Ilie Năstase.; Year summary WCT and independent players played separate circuits with top WCT players playing only 1 or neither of the U.S. and French Opens in order to rest. Wimbledon, which had most top players playing, was won by John Newcombe over Stan Smith and Ken Rosewall (SFs). The US Open was won by Smith defeating Kodeš, who beat Newcombe in the 1st round (event had 7 of the top 10; Laver and Rosewall of WCT absent). Smith won 6 titles overall, including 3 significant Grand Prix events, and was 70–13. Newcombe also won the U.S. Pro Indoor over Laver for a total of 5 titles for a 53–14 record, including 1–1 vs. Smith, 3–1 vs. Rosewall and 1–1 vs. Laver.
1972	Ken Rosewall (AUS); Stan Smith (USA)	Rankings: Rosewall ranked No. 1 by Rino Tommasi, with Laver No. 2.; Smith ranked No. 1 by: 'Martini and Rossi' Award, voted for by a panel of journalists, with 97 points. Năstase was No. 2 (91 points).; Judith Elian.; Lance Tingay.; Neil Amdur, World Tennis.; Bud Collins.; Rex Bellamy, with Năstase No. 2.; Frank Rostron.; Year summary WCT and independent players played separate circuits most of the year with WCT players banned from the French Open, Wimbledon and the Davis Cup by the ILTF. An agreement allowed WCT players to play the US Open and Grand Prix events thereafter, but the top players of the two groups did not play each other aside from Ilie Năstase defeating Arthur Ashe (WCT) in the finals of the US Open after Ashe beat Stan Smith in the QFs. Smith won the Pacific Southwest Open, an "A" Grand Prix tournament with some WCT players (Rosewall lost QFs; Nastase and Ashe lost 3rd round; Laver and Newcombe absent), the Stockholm "A" Grand Prix, which had some lower-ranked WCT players, as well as the depleted Wimbledon over Năstase. Smith won 4 of the 7 "A" or "B" Grand Prix he entered and 9 titles overall for a 79–12 record (including 7–1 in the Davis Cup; defeated Nastase in the finals) with a 4–1 record vs. Nastase. Năstase also won the Masters over Smith (no WCT players) for 12 titles in total (2 "A" or "B" Grand Prix) for a 110–19 record.
The ATP ranking was introduced in 1973 to establish objective, standardized tournament seedings.
1973	Ilie Năstase (ROM); John Newcombe (AUS)	Rankings: Năstase ranked No. 1 by: The new ATP point rankings (based on average points earned per event excluding the Masters and WCT Finals, minimum 12 events), Newcombe No. 2.; Martini and Rossi' Award, voted for by a panel of journalists.; International poll of 17 tennis writers.; Tennis Magazine (U.S.), with Newcombe No. 2.; Bud Collins, with Newcombe No. 2.; Rino Tommasi, with Connors No. 2.; Rex Bellamy, with Okker No. 2. (Note: He ranked Smith No. 1 for the 11 months through October in December 1973); Newcombe ranked No. 1 by: Lance Tingay, with Smith No. 2.; Judith Elian, with Năstase No. 2.; Year summary Ilie Năstase won the French Open (no other the top players made the SFs) and the year-end Masters defeating Tom Okker and Jimmy Connors (SFs) (John Newcombe made SFs; Stan Smith lost round robin). Newcombe beat Jan Kodeš to win the US Open after they defeated Ken Rosewall and Smith in the SFs (Nastase lost 2nd round) and won the Australian Open, Rosewall, who lost in the 3rd round, being the only other top 10 player entered. Nastase won 15 of 31 events he entered, including 3 of 5 USTLA Indoor Circuit events he played and 2 Group A Grand Prix tournaments (of 6 played), including the Italian Open; he was 1–0 vs. Newcombe and Smith and 4–1 vs. Connors. Newcombe only won 1 other title but was runner-up in 5, including in 2 of the 3 Group A Grand Prix events he entered. Smith and Newcombe did not play each other, apart from a climactic Davis Cup match in the final at Cleveland, probably the finest match of the year, won by Newcombe. Nastase lost to Smith in the Davis Cup semi-final.
1974	Jimmy Connors (USA)	Rankings: Connors ranked No. 1 by: ATP point rankings.; 'Martini and Rossi' Award, voted for by a panel of journalists.; Rex Bellamy.; Rino Tommasi.; World Tennis.; Tennis Magazine (U.S.).; Bud Collins.; Judith Elian.; Lance Tingay.; Year summary Jimmy Connors won Wimbledon and the US Open, both over 39-year-old Ken Rosewall (who defeated John Newcombe at both (QF and SF)), plus the Australian Open (Newcombe lost QFs; 3 top 10 players played and its ATP points were equal to a mid-level ("B") Grand Prix tournament), but was banned from playing the French Open by its organizers because he signed to play World TeamTennis with a season overlapping the event. Connors won 15 titles on a record of 99–4, including 3 of the 6 top-level ("AA") Grand Prix events he entered (including the US Clay Court over Björn Borg, their only match). Connors did not play the WCT circuit in the winter/spring instead playing the USLTA's indoor circuit, winning 7 of his titles, and did not play Newcombe or Vilas this year. Newcombe won 10 events, including 4 of 10 in 1 of the 3 groups of the WCT circuit, the non-tour affiliated Palm Springs (with 7 of top 10 players), and the WCT Finals over Borg (Guillermo Vilas and Rosewall did not play) and played few GP events, winning 3 mid-level events, defeated Rosewall in a final; Newcombe was 2–0 vs. Borg. Vilas won the year-end Masters defeated Ilie Năstase in the finals, plus defeated Newcombe (their only match) and Borg in the round robin (Connors absent; Laver and Rosewall ineligible) plus 6 clay GP events (out of 20), including 3 AAs out of 9, but did not make the QFs of a major.
The ATP Player of the Year award was introduced in 1975, but the ATP ranking year-end points leader wasn't always awarded the ATP Player of the Year. (Note: See 1975, 1976, 1977, 1978, 1980, 1982 and 1989.)
1975	Arthur Ashe (USA) (ATP Player of the Year); Jimmy Connors (USA) (ATP year-end points leader)	Rankings: Connors finished top of the ATP year-end point rankings, with Vilas No. 2, Borg No. 3 and Ashe No. 4.; Ashe was awarded the inaugural ATP Player of the Year.; Connors ranked No. 1 by Tommasi, with Vilas No. 2.; Ashe ranked No. 1 by all other sources. Bellamy, Collins, Elian and Lorge ranked Borg No. 2; Tingay ranked Orantes No. 2; World Tennis and Tennis Magazine (U.S.) ranked Connors No. 2. Ashe was awarded the 'Martini and Rossi' Award, voted for by a panel of journalists.; Year summary Arthur Ashe won Wimbledon defeating Jimmy Connors (their only match of the year) and Björn Borg (in the SFs) (Guillermo Vilas lost QFs; Manuel Orantes absent); Manuel Orantes defeated Connors on the new clay at the US Open (Connors defeated Borg in SFs; Vilas also made SFs; Ashe lost 4th round); and Ilie Năstase won the Masters over Borg and Vilas (Borg beat Ashe in SFs; Orantes lost in round robin; Connors absent). Ashe won 9 tournaments (out of 29) including the WCT Finals over Borg (Connors, Vilas and Orantes ineligible and mostly did not play the WCT circuit), 2 top-tier ("AA") Grand Prix titles (out of 10 entered) and 4 of his 9 WCT group events. Ashe was 97–18 including 4–3 vs. Borg, 1–1 vs. Vilas and 1–2 vs. Orantes. Borg beat Vilas (was 3–1 vs. Vilas on the year) to win both the French Open (Orantes lost 1st round; Ashe and Connors absent) and the U.S. Pro AA Grand Prix event, won 1 "A" Grand Prix event, and won 2 of his 9 WCT group events for a 77–17 record. Connors also made the finals of the Australian Open losing to John Newcombe (they were the only top 10 players competing) and won 9 tournaments, none of them AA Grand Prix events (he only entered 2 of those beating Borg a second time in the SFs of one) with an 82–8 record. Orantes won 8 tournaments, including 3 AA Grand Prix events, one being the US Clay Court (over Ashe), and was 87–18 (4–0 vs. Vilas and 1–0 vs. Connors).
1976	Björn Borg (SWE) (ATP Player of the Year); Jimmy Connors (USA) (ATP year-end points leader)	Rankings: Connors finished top of the ATP year-end point rankings, with Borg No. 2.; Borg was awarded ATP Player of the Year.; Connors was ranked No. 1 by World Tennis, Tennis Magazine (U.S.), Collins, Tingay, Barrett, Tommasi, Bodo and Elian. All ranked Borg No. 2 except for Tommasi who ranked Nastase instead. Connors also ranked No. 1 over Borg for 1976 by 23/26 players asked at the 1977 U.S. Pro Indoor, with two abstentions and 1 vote for Borg.; Borg ranked No. 1 by Tennis Magazine (France).; Year summary Björn Borg won Wimbledon over Ilie Năstase (Jimmy Connors and Guillermo Vilas made QFs; Manuel Orantes absent) and Connors won the US Open over Borg and Vilas (Borg beat Nastase in SFs and Orantes in QFs). Connors won 12 tournaments, including 3 top-tier Grand Prix (GP) events of 6 entered (1 being the US Clay Court), plus the U.S. Pro Indoor over Borg and the non-tour affiliated Palm Springs (8 of top 10 players playing), defeating Borg in the SFs, compiling a 90–8 record (4–0 vs. Borg). Borg won 7 titles including 1 top-tier GP event (the U.S. Pro) of 2 entered, and the WCT Finals over Vilas (Connors, Orantes and Nastase did not play) compiling a 63–14 record.
1977	Björn Borg (SWE) (ATP Player of the Year) chosen by majority of sources in 1978. Jimmy Connors (USA) (ATP year-end points leader) Guillermo Vilas (ARG) (World Tennis Player of the Year, among other sources)	Rankings: Connors finished top of the ATP year-end point rankings, with Vilas No. 2, Borg No. 3.; Borg was awarded ATP Player of the Year.; Borg was ranked No. 1 by Tennis Magazine (France), Tennis Magazine (U.S.), Barrett, Lorge, Collins, Tingay, Tommasi, Elian and Laver.; Vilas was ranked No. 1 by Collins and Barrett by the 2010s.; Vilas was ranked No. 1 by World Tennis, France Presse, Tennis de France, Le Livre d'or du Tennis, Scott, Bodo, Quidet, and Sutter. The International Tennis Hall of Fame inscription for Vilas stated "it was generally considered Vilas was the real No. 1 for 1977".; Year summary Björn Borg won Wimbledon over Jimmy Connors and Vitas Gerulaitis (Guillermo Vilas lost in 3rd round) while Vilas won the US Open over Connors (Borg and Gerulaitis lost 4th round, Borg retiring due to injury) and a partially depleted French Open over Brian Gottfried (Borg and Connors played World TeamTennis; Gerulaitis and 2 further top 10 players absent). Borg won 13 of 20 tournaments for an 81–7 match record, including 3–0 vs. Vilas (a 4th match between them in the final of the Johannesburg Open, a top-tier event, was cancelled) and 2–1 vs. Connors. Vilas won 17 out of 32 tournaments for a 145–14 record (including 4-match non-ATP title at Rye, New York and 6–0 in the Davis Cup), plus won 50 matches in a row, although some events had no top-10-ranked players; for the year Borg was 16–3 vs. Top 10 players; Vilas 13–6. Vilas was 2–0 vs. Connors and made the finals of the January Australian Open (he was the only top 10 player who entered) losing to Roscoe Tanner.
The ITF World Champions were first named in 1978. From now on, players listed in the number one column are ATP Point leaders, ATP Players of the Year and ITF World Champions only.
1978	Björn Borg (SWE) (ATP Player of the Year & ITF World Champion); Jimmy Connors (USA) (ATP year-end points leader)	Rankings: Connors finished top of the ATP year-end point rankings, with Borg. No. 2.; Borg was awarded ATP Player of the Year.; Borg was named the first ITF World Champion.; Tennis Magazine (France), World Tennis, Collins and Tingay ranked Borg first and Connors second.; Tennis Magazine (U.S.) and Tommasi ranked Connors first, Borg second.; Year summary Björn Borg won Wimbledon, defeating Jimmy Connors, and the French Open (Connors absent, but 7 top 10 players participated). Connors won the first hard-court US Open defeating Borg. Borg won 9 titles out of 17 ATP events entered compiling a 70–7 ATP record; he also won 9 additional titles in 10 special or invitational tournaments (draws of 4 to 16 players) plus was 9–0 in the Davis Cup. Connors won 10 titles, including the U.S. Pro Indoor (most top players present), in 16 ATP events entered for a 66–6 record, plus won 4 titles in special or invitational events. Borg had an 18–3 record versus top 10 players (defeated 7 more at special events) while Connors was 14–3 versus top 10 players. Borg was 3–2 vs. Connors (including 1–1 at special events).
1979	Björn Borg (SWE)	Rankings: Borg finished top of the ATP year-end point rankings, with McEnroe No. 3.; Borg was awarded ATP Player of the Year.; Borg was named ITF World Champion.; World Tennis, Tennis Magazine (US), Tennis Magazine (France), Collins, Tingay and Tommasi ranked Borg first, McEnroe second.; Year summary Björn Borg won 3 of the 4 most important events: Wimbledon defeating Jimmy Connors in SFs (John McEnroe lost 4th round); the French (Connors lost SFs; McEnroe absent but 8 of the top 10 players participated); and the Masters defeating McEnroe in SFs (Connors lost in SFs). McEnroe won the US Open defeating Connors in SFs (Borg lost QFs), and the WCT Finals defeating Borg and Connors (SFs). Borg won 4 of the 5 Super Series events he played and 13 titles out of 20 tournaments for an 84–6 record. McEnroe won 2 of 6 Super Series he played for 10 titles total with a 91–14 record, including 8–0 in the Davis Cup. Borg was 4–0 vs. Connors and 4–2 vs. McEnroe while McEnroe-Connors were 2–2.
1980	Björn Borg (SWE)	Rankings: Borg finished top of the ATP year-end point rankings, with McEnroe No. 2.; Borg was awarded ATP Player of the Year.; Borg was named the ITF World Champion.; World Tennis, Tennis Magazine (U.S.), Tennis Magazine (France), Collins, Tingay and Tommasi ranked Borg. first and McEnroe second.; Year summary Björn Borg won 3 of the 4 most important tournaments and lost in 5 sets in the finals of the 4th, the US Open. At Wimbledon he defeated John McEnroe (who beat Jimmy Connors in the SFs); at the Masters he defeated Connors (SFs) (McEnroe was 0–3); and he won the French (Connors lost SFs; McEnroe lost 3rd round). Borg also won 3 of the 5 Super Series events he entered and 9 titles in total in 14 events for a 70–6 record. McEnroe won the US Open over Borg and Connors (SFs), 2 of the 8 Super Series he entered (including the U.S. Indoor over Connors) and 9 titles in total for an 84–18 record. Borg was 3–1 vs. McEnroe.
1981	John McEnroe (USA)	Rankings: McEnroe finished top of the ATP year-end point rankings, with Borg No. 4.; McEnroe was awarded ATP Player of the Year.; McEnroe was named the ITF World Champion.; World Tennis, Tennis Magazine (France), Tennis Magazine (U.S.), Collins, Tingay and Tommasi ranked McEnroe first, Borg second.; Year summary John McEnroe won Wimbledon and the US Open defeating Björn Borg in the finals of both after Borg defeated Jimmy Connors in the SFs of both. Borg captured the French Open defeating Lendl (McEnroe and Connors lost QFs). McEnroe also won the depleted WCT Finals, with none of the year's other top 5, plus 2 of the 5 Super Series tournaments he entered for 10 titles with a 76–10 record, including 7–1 in the Davis Cup. McEnroe was 4–0 vs. Borg (including an invitational event), 1–1 vs. Connors, but 0–3 vs. Lendl. Borg played a reduced schedule winning 3 titles in the 9 events with a 35–6 record (2–0 vs. both Lendl and Connors) and semi-retired in October.
1982	Jimmy Connors (USA) (ATP Player of the Year & ITF World Champion); John McEnroe (USA) (ATP and Nixdorf year-end points leader)	Rankings: McEnroe finished top of the ATP year-end point rankings, with Connors No. 2, Lendl No. 3.; McEnroe finished top of the Nixdorf year-end point rankings, with Lendl No. 2, Connors No. 3.; Connors was awarded ATP Player of the Year.; Connors was named the ITF World Champion.; World Tennis, Tennis Magazine (France), Tennis Magazine (U.S.), Barrett, Collins and Tingay all ranked Connors first, Lendl second.; Tommasi ranked Lendl first, McEnroe second.; Year summary Jimmy Connors won both Wimbledon, defeating John McEnroe (Ivan Lendl and Guillermo Vilas absent), and the US Open, defeating Lendl and Vilas (Lendl beat McEnroe in SFs). Lendl won both the Masters (first year of 12-player knock-out format) over McEnroe and Connors (McEnroe defeated Vilas in SFs) and the WCT Finals, beating McEnroe (only 1 other top 10 player present). Connors won 7 out of 18 tournaments, but did not win a Grand Prix Super Series out of 4 entered, compiling a 78–10 record. Lendl won 15 out of 23 events (although 8 were WCT events, most with no top 10 players entered) including 2 of the 4 Super Series he played (one being Cincinnati with 6 of the top 10), for a 106–9 record. Connors was 1–2 vs. Lendl and 2–2 vs. McEnroe with Lendl 4–1 vs. McEnroe.
1983	John McEnroe (USA)	Rankings: McEnroe finished top of the ATP year-end point rankings.; McEnroe finished top of the Nixdorf year-end point rankings.; McEnroe was awarded ATP Player of the Year.; McEnroe was named the ITF World Champion.; Tingay and Tennis Magazine (U.S.) had McEnroe first, Connors second. World Tennis, Tennis Magazine (France) and Collins had McEnroe first, Wilander second.; Tommasi had Wilander first, Lendl second, McEnroe third.; Year summary John McEnroe won Wimbledon defeating Ivan Lendl in the SFs (Jimmy Connors lost 4th round; Mats Wilander 3rd round) and the Masters (knock-out format) defeated Lendl and Wilander (Lendl beat Jimmy Connors in SFs) to claim the ATP No. 1 Ranking. Wilander lost to Yannick Noah in the French Open. For the first time since 1971 the Australian Open featured top-ranked players (but only 3 of the top 10) as Wilander defeated Lendl and McEnroe to capture the title. In the depleted WCT Finals McEnroe beat Lendl (other top 5 absent). Of the Grand Prix Super Series, McEnroe won 3 of 6 entered, including the U.S. Pro Indoor, again over Lendl, while Wilander won 2 of 6, including Monte Carlo (with 6 of top 10 playing) and Cincinnati (7 of top 10), over McEnroe. McEnroe was 63–11 with 7 titles and 2 titles in non-ATP events and was 5–2 vs Lendl, but 1–3 vs Wilander. Wilander won 9 titles in total with an 82–11 record, including 8–0 in the Davis Cup.
1984	John McEnroe (USA)	Rankings: McEnroe finished top of the ATP year-end point rankings.; McEnroe was awarded ATP Player of the Year.; McEnroe was named the ITF World Champion.; World Tennis and Tommasi ranked McEnroe first, Connors second. Tennis Magazine (U.S.), Collins and Tingay ranked McEnroe first, Lendl second.; Year summary John McEnroe lost only 3 matches (82 wins) and won 3 of the 4 most important tournaments losing in 5 sets in the finals of the 4th, the French Open. At Wimbledon he defeated Ivan Lendl after defeated Mats Wilander in the SFs (Lendl defeated Jimmy Connors in SFs); at the US Open he defeated Lendl and Connors (Wilander lost QFs); and at the Masters (12-player knock-out format) he again defeated Lendl after they beat Wilander and Connors, respectively, in the SFs. At the French Open Lendl came from down 2 sets to defeated McEnroe after they defeated Wilander and Connors in the SFs. McEnroe missed the Australian Open with a wrist injury (Lendl lost 4th round; Connors absent; 3 of the top 10 players played). McEnroe also won a depleted WCT Finals over Connors (Lendl and Wilander absent). McEnroe won 13 events (8 indoors, 2 grass, 2 hard, 1 clay) of 15, including 4 of the 5 Super Series he played including the U.S. Pro Indoor over Lendl and the Canadian Open (which had 6 and 7 of the top 10). McEnroe was 5–1 vs Lendl, 6–0 vs Connors and 3–0 vs Wilander, plus 7–1 in the Davis Cup, his loss coming in the finals as Sweden won the Cup. Lendl won 3 events, including 1 of 6 Super Series, and was a finalist in 8 with a 62–16 record.
1985	Ivan Lendl (TCH)	Rankings: Lendl finished top of the ATP year-end point rankings.; Lendl was awarded ATP Player of the Year.; Lendl was named the ITF World Champion.; Tommasi ranked Lendl first, McEnroe second. Collins ranked Lendl first, Becker second. Tingay and World Tennis ranked Lendl first, Wilander second.; Year summary Ivan Lendl won the US Open over John McEnroe and Jimmy Connors (Mats Wilander lost SFs) and the 16-player knockout Masters over Boris Becker (Wilander lost QFs; McEnroe 1st round; Connors absent). Wilander beat Lendl and McEnroe at the French Open (Lendl beat Connors in SFs). Lendl also won the WCT Finals defeated Connors in the SFs (McEnroe and Wilander lost QFs) and won 5 of the 7 Super Series tournaments he entered, including the Tokyo Indoor (with 7 of the top 10) over Wilander. Lendl won 11 of the 17 events he entered with an 84–7 record overall, including 3–2 vs McEnroe and 3–1 vs Wilander. Wilander won 3 titles (0 of 7 Super Series) but was a finalist in 10 events compiling a 69–21 record.
1986	Ivan Lendl (TCH)	Rankings: Lendl finished top of the ATP year-end point rankings, with Becker No. 2.; Lendl was awarded ATP Player of the Year.; Lendl was named the ITF World Champion.; Barrett, Collins, Tingay, Tommasi and World Tennis ranked Lendl first, Becker second.; Year summary Ivan Lendl won 3 of the 4 most important tournaments of the year, but lost in the finals of the 4th, Wimbledon. Lendl won the US Open over Miloslav Mečíř and Stefan Edberg, with Mecir beating Boris Becker (SF); the French Open defeating Mikael Pernfors, who defeated Becker in the QFs; and the Masters defeated Becker and Wilander (event returned to 8-player round robin). Becker won Wimbledon defeated Lendl with Wilander losing in the 4th round. There was no Australian Open that year as it was switching to January from December. Lendl defeated Wilander to win the Lipton International (with 9 of the top 10 players present), this year upgraded to a Super Series event with a 128-player draw considered by a few to be the "5th major" (was worth more ATP points than the Australian Open this year through 1989). Lendl won 2 other Super Series (of 7 entered), the U.S. Pro Indoor (6 of the top 10 present in its last year as a Super Series) and the Italian Open (8 of top 10 present) and finished the year with 9 titles and a 74–6 record, but only 2–3 vs Becker. Becker won 3 of 7 Super Series, including the Canadian Open (6 of the top 10), for 6 titles altogether and a 69–13 record.
1987	Ivan Lendl (TCH)	Rankings: Lendl finished top of the ATP year-end point rankings, with Edberg No. 2, Wilander No. 3.; Lendl was awarded ATP Player of the Year.; Lendl was named the ITF World Champion.; Collins ranked Lendl first, Wilander second. World Tennis, Barrett and Tommasi ranked Lendl first, Edberg second. Tingay ranked Lendl first, Cash second.; Year summary Lendl won the US Open, the French Open and the Masters, each time defeating Mats Wilander in the finals; Wilander defeated Boris Becker in the SFs of the French Open and Stefan Edberg in the SFs of the other two (Edberg lost 2nd round of French). Lendl lost to Pat Cash in the finals of Wimbledon after Lendl defeated Edberg in the QFs (Wilander also lost QFs). Edberg won the last grass-court Australian Open, with 6 of the top 10 players present, over Cash, who defeated Lendl in the SFs (Wilander absent). Lendl also won 3 of the 5 Super Series tournaments he entered for 8 titles in total for a 74–7 record, including 2–1 vs Edberg and 3–0 vs Wilander. Edberg won 3 Super Series out of 7 for 7 titles total with a 78–12 record with a 2–2 split against Wilander. Wilander won 2 of 6 Super Series, including the Italian Open and Monte Carlo (both 8 of top 10) with 5 titles total with a 71–18 record.
1988	Mats Wilander (SWE)	Rankings: Wilander finished top of the ATP year-end point rankings, with Lendl No. 2.; Wilander was awarded ATP Player of the Year.; Wilander was named the ITF World Champion.; World Tennis, Barrett, Collins and Tingay ranked Wilander first, Edberg second.; Tommasi ranked Becker first, Lendl second, Wilander third.; Year summary Mats Wilander captured 3 major titles: the first hard-court Australian Open over Pat Cash (6 of the top 10 players present); the French Open defeating Henri Leconte and Andre Agassi (Lendl lost QFs); and, the US Open defeated Lendl 6–4 in the 5th set, an exact reversal of their final from the previous year, after Lendl defeated Agassi in the SFs. Wilander also won 2 Super Series of 6 played, including the Lipton International over Jimmy Connors, and 6 titles total with a 53–11 record. Lendl won 3 Super Series out of 3, including the Canadian Open (6 of the top 10) and the Italian Open, for a 41–8 record only playing 10 events.
1989	Boris Becker (GER) (ATP Player of the Year & ITF World Champion); Ivan Lendl (TCH) (ATP year-end points leader)	Rankings: Lendl finished top of the ATP year-end point rankings, with Becker No. 2.; Becker was awarded ATP Player of the Year.; Becker was named the ITF World Champion.; Tennis Magazine (France), Barrett, Collins, Tingay and World Tennis ranked Becker first and Lendl second.; Year summary Boris Becker won Wimbledon over Stefan Edberg and Ivan Lendl (SFs) and the US Open over Lendl (Edberg lost 4th round). Lendl won the Australian Open (was worth 260 ATP points compared to 380 or 400 for the other 3 majors; 6 of the top 10 players were present) while Becker lost in the 4th round and Edberg lost in the QFs. Becker won 3 other titles (in 13 events), including 1 Super Series of 5, the Paris Indoor (7 of the top 10) over Edberg, compiling a 64–8 record including 4–2 vs. Edberg. Becker was also undefeated in 7 Davis Cup matches beating Andre Agassi, Mats Wilander and Edberg as West Germany won for the second straight year. Lendl also won 4 Super Series of 4, including the Lipton International, Stockholm and the German Open (all had 6 of top 10), and 5 other titles for a 79–7 match record, but was 0–2 vs. Becker.
The ATP ranking's average system was replaced with a best of system in 1990. (Note: Originally, best of 14 events but expanded to 18 in 2000.)
1990	Stefan Edberg (SWE) (ATP); Ivan Lendl (TCH) (ITF)	Rankings: Edberg finished top of the ATP year-end point rankings. In the ranking, Becker was No. 2, Lendl No. 3, and Agassi No. 4.; Lendl was named the ITF World Champion.; Tennis Magazine (France) ranked Edberg first, Agassi second and Lendl third. Barrett, Collins (Note: Collins & Hollander (1997), p. 652 has Edberg, Lendl and Sampras equal at No. 2, with no No. 1.) and World Tennis ranked Edberg first, Lendl second.; Year summary For the first time since 1977, no player won more than one of the five most important tournaments of the year. Stefan Edberg defeated Boris Becker and Ivan Lendl at Wimbledon. Edberg also won three of the seven ATP Championship Series events (the former Super Series) he played, including Indian Wells and the Paris Indoor (both with 8 of the top 10 players playing). Edberg lost the final of the Australian Open to Lendl retiring in the third set due to injury (the event had the top 4 and 5 of the top 10 players; its ATP points were increased to be 360 vs 400 for other majors). Agassi defeated Edberg to win the year-ending ATP World Tour Championship (renamed from the "Masters"; points were now awarded for it in the ATP point rankings), after they defeated Becker and Lendl in the SFs, and beat Edberg again to win the Lipton International (his only Championship Series win of six). Edberg won seven titles from 12 finals for a 70–15 record, while Agassi won 4 titles for a 45–12 record and was absent from the Australian Open and Wimbledon. Becker was 71–15 with 5 titles from 10 finals including 1 Champship Series of 7 (Stockholm, with 7 of top 10) and Lendl was 54–12 with 5 titles winning no Champship Series of 3. The top 4 had close records against each other except Agassi was 3–0 vs Becker.
1991	Stefan Edberg (SWE)	Rankings: Edberg finished top of the ATP year-end point rankings. In the ranking, Courier was No. 2.; Edberg was awarded ATP Player of the Year.; Edberg was named the ITF World Champion.; Collins ranked Edberg first, Stich second. Barrett ranked Edberg first, Courier second.; Year summary For the second consecutive year, no player won more than one of the five most important tournaments. Jim Courier did win the French Open, defeating Andre Agassi, Michael Stich and Stefan Edberg (QFs), in succession (Agassi beat Boris Becker in the SFs), and two of the top ATP Championship Series events; the Lipton International and Indian Wells, his only victories of the year. Stefan Edberg won the US Open defeated Courier, after they defeated Ivan Lendl and 39-year-old Jimmy Connors in the SFs (Becker lost 3rd round).
1992	Jim Courier (USA)	Rankings: Courier finished top of the ATP year-end point rankings. In the ranking, Edberg was No. 2.; Courier was awarded ATP Player of the Year.; Courier was named the ITF World Champion.; Barrett and Collins ranked Courier first, Edberg second.; Year summary Jim Courier won both the Australian Open (with 8 of the top 10 playing), defeating Stefan Edberg in the final, and the French Open, defeated Petr Korda and Andre Agassi (Pete Sampras lost QFs and Edberg 3rd round). Andre Agassi won Wimbledon defeated Goran Ivanišević (Sampras and Edberg lost QFs; Courier lost 3rd round). Edberg won the US Open defeated Pete Sampras, after they defeated Michael Chang and Courier in the SFs. Boris Becker won the year-ending ATP Tour World Championship defeated Courier in the final after they defeated Ivanisevic and Sampras in the SFs. Courier (the Italian Open), Edberg, Sampras (Cincinnati with 8 of the top 10), Edberg won three titles total. Courier was 69–18 (including 1–0 vs Edberg and 1–2 vs Sampras), while Edberg was 68–24 (1–2 vs Sampras).
1993	Pete Sampras (USA)	Rankings: Sampras finished top of the ATP year-end point rankings. In the ranking, Stich was No. 2, and Courier No. 3.; Sampras was awarded ATP Player of the Year.; Sampras was named the ITF World Champion.; Barrett, Collins and Tennis Magazine (France) ranked Sampras first and Courier second.; Year summary Pete Sampras won Wimbledon (defeating Jim Courier in the final, who defeated Stefan Edberg in the SFs; Michael Stich lost 4th round), the US Open (defeated Cédric Pioline; Courier and Stich lost in 4th and 1st rounds), and the Lipton International (his only Championship Series win). Sergi Bruguera won the French Open, defeated Courier in the final and Sampras in the QFs (Stich lost 4th round), and five titles including one ATP Championship Series. Courier won the Australian Open (all of the top 10 players were to play but 2 withdrew with injury) defeated Stefan Edberg (who defeated Sampras in the QFs) and Michael Stich in the SFs, plus 2 Champ Series (the Italian Open and Indian Wells). Stich won the ATP Tour World Championship defeated Sampras in the final and Courier in the round robin (Courier and Bruguera eliminated in round robin) and two Championship Series (one being Stockholm with 8 of the top 10). Sampras was 85–16 with 8 titles from 23 events and was 2–0 vs. Courier and 1–1 vs. Stich. Stich won 6 titles, was 76–22 and 1–1 vs. Courier. Courier won 5 titles with a 58–17 record.
1994	Pete Sampras (USA)	Rankings: Sampras finished top of the ATP year-end point rankings. In the ranking, Agassi was No. 2.; Sampras was awarded ATP Player of the Year.; Sampras was named the ITF World Champion.; Barrett and Collins ranked Sampras first, Agassi second.; Year summary Pete Sampras won four of the six most important tournaments of the year: Australian Open defeating Todd Martin (had 7 of the top 10 players; Boris Becker and Andre Agassi absent); Wimbledon defeated Goran Ivanišević, who defeated Becker in the SFs (Agassi lost 4th round); the ATP Tour World Championship defeated Becker (after they defeated Agassi and Bruguera in the SFs); and, the Lipton International Championship Series defeated Agassi. Agassi won the US Open defeated Michael Stich (Sampras lost 4th round; Becker 1st round). Sampras won two more ATP Championship Series out of five played (the Italian Open and Indian Wells both with 8 of the top 10) for ten titles in total and a 77–12 record (3–1 vs Agassi and 1–2 vs Becker). Agassi won two of seven Championship Series, including the Paris Indoor (9 of top 10), and five titles total for a 52–14 record, including 1–0 vs Becker.
1995	Pete Sampras (USA)	Rankings: Sampras finished top of the ATP year-end point rankings. In the ranking, Agassi was No. 2 and Muster No. 3.; Sampras was awarded ATP Player of the Year.; Sampras was named the ITF World Champion.; Barrett and Collins ranked Sampras first, Agassi second.; Year summary Pete Sampras won Wimbledon defeating Boris Becker, who defeated Andre Agassi in the SFs (Thomas Muster absent), and the US Open defeated Agassi, who defeated Becker in the SFs (Muster lost 4th round). Agassi won the Australian Open defeated Sampras (Muster lost 3rd round and Becker 1st round)(from this year forward it usually had as many of the top 10 players play as the other majors). Sampras also won two of nine ATP Championship Series tournaments played and a total of 5 titles from 9 finals (out of 21 events) for a 72–16 record (2–3 vs Agassi, 3–0 vs Becker and 0–1 vs Muster). Agassi also won 3 of 6 Champ Series, including the Lipton International defeated Sampras (all the other Champ Series had at least 8 of the top 10 players participate), for 7 titles out of 16 events for a 73–9 record.
1996	Pete Sampras (USA)	Rankings: Sampras finished top of the ATP year-end point rankings. In the ranking, Chang was No. 2, and Kafelnikov No. 3.; Sampras was awarded ATP Player of the Year.; Sampras was named the ITF World Champion.; Collins ranked Sampras first, Chang second.; Year summary Pete Sampras won the US Open, defeating Michael Chang and Goran Ivanišević (SFs), and the ATP World Tour Championship defeated Boris Becker (a reverse of their round robin match) after they defeated Ivanisevic and Richard Krajicek in the SFs. Sampras did not win any ATP Super Nine events (renamed from Champ Series). Sampras won eight titles for a 65–11 record including 3–0 vs Chang, 2–2 vs Kafelnikov and 2–2 vs Ivanisevic. Chang won one Super Nine and two other titles with a 65–19 record (1–2 vs Ivanisevic but did not play Kafelnikov).
1997	Pete Sampras (USA)	Rankings: Sampras finished top of the ATP year-end point rankings. In the ranking, Rafter was No. 2.; Sampras was awarded ATP Player of the Year.; Sampras was named the ITF World Champion.; Year summary Pete Sampras won Wimbledon (defeating Cédric Pioline in the final), the Australian Open (defeated Carlos Moyá in the final, who defeated Michael Chang in the SFs) and the year-ending ATP Tour World Championship (defeated Yevgeny Kafelnikov in the final and Jonas Björkman in the SFs). Pat Rafter won the US Open, his only title of the year, defeated Greg Rusedski in the final after they defeated Chang and Bjorkman in the SFs (Sampras lost 4th round). Sampras also won two ATP Super Nine events and eight titles in total for a 55–12 record, including 5–0 vs Rafter. Rafter finished 65–29 and was the runner-up in 7 tournaments.
1998	Pete Sampras (USA)	Rankings: Sampras finished top of the ATP year-end point rankings. In the ranking, Rios was No. 2, and Rafter No. 4.; Sampras was awarded ATP Player of the Year.; Sampras was named the ITF World Champion.; Tennis Magazine (U.S.) ranked Rafter first.; Year summary For the 1st year since 1991, no player won more than one of the five most important tournaments. Pete Sampras won Wimbledon over Goran Ivanišević, plus three other titles, none of them an ATP Super Nine. Pat Rafter won the US Open defeating Mark Philippoussis and Sampras (SFs) plus won the preceding two ATP Super Nine (Canada and Cincinnati, beating 5 top 10 players) and three other titles, but did not advance past the 4th round in any other major. Rios won three Super Nines, including the Lipton International and Indian Wells, and four other titles but withdrew from the ATP Tour Championship after one match with an injury. Sampras was 61–17 (did not play Rios); Rafter 60–21 (2–0 vs Sampras, did not play Rios or Corretja); Rios 68–17 (did not play Corretja).
1999	Andre Agassi (USA)	Rankings: Agassi finished top of the ATP year-end point rankings. In the ranking, Kafelnikov was No. 2, and Sampras No. 3.; Agassi was awarded ATP Player of the Year.; Agassi was named the ITF World Champion.; Tennis Magazine (France) ranked Agassi first, Sampras second and Kafelnikov third.; Year summary Andre Agassi won the French Open (defeating Andrei Medvedev in the final), the US Open (defeated Todd Martin in the final), a Super Nine event and two other titles for a 63–14 record. Pete Sampras won Wimbledon and the year-ending ATP Tour World Championship (defeated Agassi in both finals), won a Super Nine, but lost in the 2nd round of the French and was absent from the Australian Open and the US Open, the latter due to injury, only playing in 13 events. Sampras was 40–8 with 5 titles and was 4–1 vs. Agassi. Yevgeny Kafelnikov won the Australian Open (defeated Thomas Enqvist in the final; Agassi lost in 4th round), won an ATP Super Nine, and made the SFs of the US Open and the ATP Tour Championships plus won two other titles for a 61–32 record (1–3 vs Agassi and did not play Sampras).
With a streamlined ATP points ranking system, the ATP Player of the Year is required to be awarded to the year-end No. 1 points leader every year since 2000.
2000	Gustavo Kuerten (BRA)	Rankings: Kuerten finished the season as the ATP year-end No. 1 (ATP Player of the Year). In the ranking, Safin was No. 2.; Kuerten was named the ITF World Champion.; Year summary Gustavo Kuerten won the French Open (defeating Magnus Norman in the final), the year-ending Tennis Masters Cup, renamed from ATP Tour World Championship (defeating Andre Agassi in the final, a win that enabled him to pass Marat Safin for the ATP No. 1 ranking, 4195 points to 4120) and three other titles, including an ATP Masters (renamed from Super Nine). Safin won the US Open (defeated Pete Sampras in the final) and six other titles, including 2 Masters. Kuerten was 63–22, including 2–0 vs Safin and 1–1 vs Sampras; Safin was 73–27, including 2–1 vs Sampras.
2001	Lleyton Hewitt (AUS)	Rankings: Hewitt finished the season as the ATP year-end No. 1 (ATP Player of the Year). In the ranking, Kuerten was No. 2.; Hewitt was named the ITF World Champion.; Year summary Lleyton Hewitt won the US Open (defeated Pete Sampras in the final) and the year-ending Tennis Masters Cup (defeated Sébastien Grosjean in the final) as well as four other titles but no ATP Masters, but did make the SFs of five of those. Gustavo Kuerten won the French Open (defeated Àlex Corretja in the final) and five other titles including two Masters. Hewitt was 80–18, including 1–0 vs Kuerten and 1–1 vs Agassi; Kuerten 60–18 including 0–1 vs Agassi.
2002	Lleyton Hewitt (AUS)	Rankings: Hewitt finished the season as the ATP year-end No. 1 (ATP Player of the Year). In the ranking, Agassi was No. 2.; Hewitt was named the ITF World Champion.; Year summary Lleyton Hewitt won Wimbledon (defeated David Nalbandian in the final), the Tennis Masters Cup (defeated Juan Carlos Ferrero in the final; Marat Safin was 0–3 and Andre Agassi was injured), one ATP Masters tournament and two other titles. Agassi won three Masters titles. Hewitt was 61–15 (2–1 vs Agassi); Agassi 53–12.
2003	Andy Roddick (USA)	Rankings: Roddick finished the season as the ATP year-end No. 1 (ATP Player of the Year). In the ranking, Federer was No. 2, and Ferrero No. 3.; Roddick was named the ITF World Champion.; Tennis Magazine (France) ranked Roddick first, Ferrero second and Federer third.; Year summary Andy Roddick won the US Open (defeated Juan Carlos Ferrero in the final), two ATP Masters and three other titles. Roger Federer won Wimbledon (defeated Mark Philippoussis in the final and Roddick in SFs), the Tennis Masters Cup (defeated Andre Agassi in the final and Roddick in the SFs; Ferrero was 0–3) and three other titles but did not reach the QFs of any other major tournament or win a Masters. Ferrero won the French Open (defeated Martin Verkerk in the final) plus two Masters and one other title. Roddick was 72–19; Federer 78–17 and Ferrero 67–21.
2004	Roger Federer (SUI)	Rankings: Federer finished the season as the ATP year-end No. 1 (ATP Player of the Year). In the ranking, Roddick was No. 2, and Hewitt No. 3.; Federer was named the ITF World Champion.; Tennis Magazine (France) ranked Federer first, Hewitt second and Roddick third.; Year summary Roger Federer won three major singles titles: the Australian Open (defeated Marat Safin in the final; Andy Roddick made SFs), Wimbledon (defeated Roddick in the final) and the US Open (defeated Lleyton Hewitt in the final). Federer also won the Tennis Masters Cup (defeated Hewitt in the final; Roddick and Safin made SFs). Federer also won three Masters and 11 titles total compiling a 74–6 record, including 3–0 vs. Roddick, 6–0 vs Hewitt and 3–0 vs Safin. Roddick won an ATP Masters while Hewitt won none with both winning 4 titles.
2005	Roger Federer (SUI)	Rankings: Federer finished the season as the ATP year-end No. 1 (ATP Player of the Year). In the ranking, Nadal was No. 2.; Federer was named the ITF World Champion.; Year summary Roger Federer reached all four major semi-finals winning Wimbledon (defeated Andy Roddick in the final) and the US Open (defeated Andre Agassi in the final). Rafael Nadal won the French Open (defeated Mariano Puerta in the final) but lost before the 4th round in the other three Grand Slam events. Federer won four of the five ATP Masters events he entered; Nadal won four of eight. Federer was 81–4 winning 11 titles. Nadal also won 11 tournaments and was 79–10. Federer was 1–1 vs Nadal, 2–0 vs Roddick and 3–0 vs Hewitt.
2006	Roger Federer (SUI)	Rankings: Federer finished the season as the ATP year-end No. 1 (ATP Player of the Year). In the ranking, Nadal was No. 2.; Federer was named the ITF World Champion.; Year summary Roger Federer won three major singles titles and made the finals of all four. He won the Australian Open (defeated Marcos Baghdatis in the final; Nadal was absent), Wimbledon (defeated Rafael Nadal in the final), and the US Open (defeated Andy Roddick in the final; Nadal made SFs). Federer also won the Tennis Masters Cup (defeated James Blake in the final and Nadal in the SFs). Nadal won the French Open (defeated Federer in the final). Federer also won four ATP Masters events (of seven played) while Nadal won two. Federer compiled a record of 92–5 (4 losses came in his 6 matches with Nadal) winning 12 titles and reached the finals of 16 of the 17 events he entered. Nadal won five titles in total for a 59–12 record.
2007	Roger Federer (SUI)	Rankings: Federer finished the season as the ATP year-end No. 1 (ATP Player of the Year). In the ranking, Nadal was No. 2 and Djokovic No. 3.; Federer was named the ITF World Champion.; Year summary Roger Federer won three major singles titles and made the finals of all four tournaments. He won the Australian Open (defeated Fernando González in the final; Rafael Nadal lost in QFs), Wimbledon (defeated Nadal in the final), and the US Open (defeated Novak Djokovic in the final; Nadal lost in QFs). Federer also won the year-ending Tennis Masters Cup (defeated David Ferrer in the final and Nadal in the SFs). Nadal won the French Open (defeated Federer in the final). Federer won two ATP Masters events while Nadal won thee. Federer won eight titles total with a 68–9 record including 3–2 vs Nadal and 3–1 vs Djokovic. Nadal was 70–15 (5–2 vs Djokovic) with six titles
2008	Rafael Nadal (ESP)	Rankings: Nadal finished the season as the ATP year-end No. 1 (ATP Player of the Year). In the ranking, Federer was No. 2, and Djokovic No. 3.; Nadal was named the ITF World Champion.; Year summary Rafael Nadal won the French Open (defeated Federer for fourth consecutive year, the last three in the final, and Novak Djokovic in SFs), Wimbledon (defeated Federer in the final 9–7 in the fifth set) and also claimed the Olympic Gold. Federer won the US Open (defeated Andy Murray after they beat Djokovic and Nadal in the SFs). Nadal won three ATP Masters, Djokovic and Murray two, Davydenko and Tsonga one, and Federer none. Nadal won eight titles with an 82–11 record including 4–0 vs Federer and 4–2 vs Djokovic. Federer won four titles with a 66–15 record including 2–1 vs Djokovic.
2009	Roger Federer (SUI)	Rankings: Federer finished the season as the ATP year-end No. 1 (ATP Player of the Year). In the ranking, Nadal was No. 2 and Djokovic No. 3.; Federer was named the ITF World Champion.; Year summary Roger Federer reached all four major finals, winning two: the French Open (defeated Robin Söderling and Juan Martín del Potro in the SFs; Rafael Nadal lost in the 4th round) and Wimbledon (defeated Andy Roddick 16–14 in the 5th set of the final; Nadal was absent). Nadal won the Australian Open (defeated Federer in the final). Nadal lost in round robin). Nadal won three ATP Masters, Federer, won two. Federer was 61–12 (1–1 vs Nadal and 2–3 vs Djokovic) with four titles from eight finals; Nadal 66–14 (4–3 vs Djokovic) with five titles.
2010	Rafael Nadal (ESP)	Rankings: Nadal finished the season as the ATP year-end No. 1 (ATP Player of the Year). In the ranking, Federer was No. 2, and Djokovic No. 3.; Nadal was named the ITF World Champion.; Year summary Rafael Nadal won three major singles titles: the French Open (defeated Robin Söderling in the final; Roger Federer lost in the QFs), Wimbledon (defeated Tomáš Berdych after they beat Andy Murray and Novak Djokovic in the SFs; Federer lost in QFs;) and the US Open (defeated Djokovic in the final, who defeated Federer in the SFs). Federer won the Australian Open (defeated Murray in the final; Nadal lost in QFs) and the year-ending ATP World Tour Finals (defeated Nadal after they beat Djokovic and Murray in the SFs). Nadal won three ATP Masters, Federer one. Nadal won seven tournaments total with a 71–10 record (1–1 vs Federer and 2–0 vs Djokovic). Federer won five titles with a 65–13 record (4–1 vs Djokovic).
2011	Novak Djokovic (SRB)	Rankings: Djokovic finished the season as the ATP year-end No. 1 (ATP Player of the Year). In the ranking, Nadal was No. 2, and Federer No. 3.; Djokovic was named the ITF World Champion.; Year summary Novak Djokovic won three major singles titles: the Australian Open (defeated Andy Murray in the final and Roger Federer in the SFs; Rafael Nadal lost in QFs), Wimbledon (defeated Nadal after they beat Federer and Murray in the SFs) and the US Open (defeated Nadal after they beat Federer and Murray in the SFs). Nadal won the French Open (defeated Federer after they beat Murray and Djokovic in the SFs). Djokovic won five ATP Masters, a new season-record, one for Nadal, and compiled a match record of 70–6 (6–0 versus Nadal and 4–1 versus Federer) winning ten titles. Nadal was 69–15 (3–1 vs Federer) with three titles in ten finals.
2012	Novak Djokovic (SRB)	Rankings: Djokovic finished the season as the ATP year-end No. 1 (ATP Player of the Year). In the ranking, Nadal was No. 2, and Murray No. 3.; Djokovic was named the ITF World Champion.; Year summary Novak Djokovic won the Australian Open (defeated Rafael Nadal 7–5 in the fifth set in a 5-hour 53 minute match, after they defeated Andy Murray and Roger Federer in the SFs) and the ATP World Tour Finals (defeated Federer in the final; Murray lost round robin and Nadal absent) to clinch the ATP No. 1 ranking. Federer won Wimbledon (defeated Murray in the final and Djokovic in SFs; Nadal lost in 2nd round). Murray won the US Open (defeated Djokovic in the final; Federer lost in QFs and Nadal was absent due to injury) and also the Olympic Gold. Djokovic and Federer each won thee ATP Masters. Djokovic's match record was 75–12 while Federer's was 71–12 both winning six titles with Djokovic leading the head-to-head 3–2.
2013	Rafael Nadal (ESP) (ATP); Novak Djokovic (SRB) (ITF)	Rankings: Nadal finished the season as the ATP year-end No. 1 (ATP Player of the Year). In the ranking, Djokovic was No. 2, Ferrer No. 3, and Murray No. 4.; Djokovic was named the ITF World Champion.; Year summary Rafael Nadal won the French Open (defeated David Ferrer in the final and Novak Djokovic in the SFs) and the US Open (defeated Djokovic in the final). Djokovic won the Australian Open (defeated Andy Murray after they defeated Ferrer and Roger Federer in the SFs) and the ATP World Tour Finals (defeated Nadal in the final who beat Federer in the SFs; Murray was absent). Nadal won five ATP Masters events versus three for Djokovic compiling a 75–7 record winning ten titles; Djokovic had a 74–9 record winning 7 titles; they had a 3–3 record versus each other.
2014	Novak Djokovic (SRB)	Rankings: Djokovic finished the season as the ATP year-end No. 1 (ATP Player of the Year). In the ranking, Federer was No. 2, and Nadal No. 3.; Djokovic was named the ITF World Champion.; Year summary Novak Djokovic won Wimbledon (defeated Roger Federer in the final). Djokovic also won four ATP Masters to two for Federer. Djokovic was 61–8 with seven titles while Federer was 73–12 (3–2 vs Djokovic) with five titles in 11 finals.
2015	Novak Djokovic (SRB)	Rankings: Djokovic finished the season as the ATP year-end No. 1 (ATP Player of the Year). In the ranking, Murray was No. 2, and Federer No. 3.; Djokovic was named the ITF World Champion.; Tennis Magazine (France) ranked Djokovic first, Federer second, Murray third.; Year summary Novak Djokovic made all four major singles finals, winning three. He won the Australian Open (defeated Andy Murray in the final; Roger Federer lost in the 3rd round), Wimbledon and the US Open plus the ATP Finals (defeated Federer in the finals of all three) but lost in the French Open final to Stan Wawrinka after beating Rafael Nadal in the QFs (Murray lost SFs and Federer lost in QFs). Djokovic won a record six ATP Masters, a season-record and a total of 11 events compiling record of 82–6 (6–1 vs Murray and 5–3 vs Federer) making the finals of 15 of 16 events. Federer was 63–11 with six titles from 11 finals (one Masters) with 2–0 record vs. Murray. Murray was 74–14 with four titles including two Masters.
2016	Andy Murray (GBR)	Rankings: Murray finished the season as the ATP year-end No. 1 (ATP Player of the Year). In the ranking, Djokovic was No. 2.; Murray was named the ITF World Champion.; Year summary Djokovic won two major titles, the Australian Open and the French Open (defeated Andy Murray in both finals). By doing so he became the second player in the Open Era to win all four major tournaments consecutively, although not in a calendar year (a "Non-calendar Year Grand Slam"). Murray then won Wimbledon (defeated Milos Raonic; Djokovic lost in the 3rd round), the Olympic Games (no ATP points awarded) and the ATP World Tour Finals (defeated Djokovic in the final, a match that decided the ATP No. 1 ranking). Djokovic won four ATP Masters and Murray three. Stan Wawrinka won the US Open defeating Djokovic in the finals; Murray lost in the quarterfinals.
2017	Rafael Nadal (ESP)	Rankings: Nadal finished the season as the ATP year-end No. 1 (ATP Player of the Year). In the ranking, Federer was No. 2.; Nadal was named the ITF World Champion.; Federer was ESPN's 2017 MVP.; Year summary Roger Federer and Rafael Nadal split the major titles. Federer won the Australian Open (defeated Rafael Nadal in the final) and Wimbledon for the record 8th time (defeated Marin Čilić; Nadal lost in the 4th round). Nadal won the French Open (defeated Stan Wawrinka; Federer absent) for the record 10th time and the US Open (defeated Kevin Anderson in the final; Federer lost in the QFs). Federer won three of the four ATP Masters he played while Nadal won two of the nine. Nadal had a 67–11 record with six titles in 18 events, thus earning more points than Federer who was 52–5 with seven titles in 12 events (did not play any clay events). Federer was 4–0 vs Nadal.
2018	Novak Djokovic (SRB)	Rankings: Djokovic finished the season as the ATP year-end No. 1 (ATP Player of the Year). In the ranking, Nadal was No. 2.; Djokovic was named the ITF World Champion.; Year summary From July to November, Novak Djokovic won Wimbledon (defeated Kevin Anderson and Rafael Nadal in the SFs 10–8 in the 5th set to even their match-up for the year at 1–1), the US Open (defeated Juan Martín del Potro who defeated Nadal in the SFs), and two out of four ATP Masters tournaments to rise from No. 22 to No. 1 in the ATP rankings unseating Nadal (36 weeks at No. 1 this year). Djokovic had no other titles and finished with a 49–11 record. Nadal won the French Open (defeated Dominic Thiem; Djokovic lost QFs), three ATP Masters out of four played, and one other title to go 45–4 in 9 events (injured in March and after the US Open).
2019	Rafael Nadal (ESP)	Rankings: Nadal finished the season as the ATP year-end No. 1 (ATP Player of the Year). In the ranking, Djokovic was No. 2.; Nadal was named the ITF World Champion.; Year summary Rafael Nadal and Novak Djokovic split the four majors. Nadal won the French Open for the record 12th time (defeated Dominic Thiem, after they defeated Roger Federer and Djokovic in the SFs) and the US Open (defeated Daniil Medvedev; Djokovic lost in 4th round) passing Djokovic (after 52 weeks), for the ATP No. 1 ranking the second last week of the season to become, at 33, the oldest year-end No. 1 in the Open Era. Djokovic won the Australian Open (defeated Nadal) and Wimbledon (defeated Federer 13–12 (3) in the fifth set; Federer defeated Nadal in SFs). Nadal and Djokovic both won two ATP Masters; Djokovic made one other final but no SFs, while Nadal made no final and four SFs. Nadal was 53–7 while Djokovic was 54–11. The Big 3 had 1–1 records against each other.
2020	Novak Djokovic (SRB) (ATP)	Rankings: Djokovic finished the season as the ATP year-end No. 1 (ATP Player of the Year). In the ranking (best of 24 months), Nadal was No. 2, Thiem No. 3, Medvedev No. 4.; The ITF named no World Champion this year.; Tennis Magazine (U.S.) ranked Djokovic first, Thiem second and Nadal third.; Year summary Year disrupted by COVID-19 pandemic, thus making the season pandemic-shortened. The top three players split the major tournaments which were played in the season: Novak Djokovic won the Australian Open (defeated Dominic Thiem in the final). Rafael Nadal claimed the French Open for the record 13th time (defeated Novak Djokovic in the final). Wimbledon was cancelled due to the pandemic. Dominic Thiem won the US Open (defeated Alexander Zverev) to win his first major title while first-seed Djokovic was disqualified from the tournament in the 4th round. Only three ATP Masters tournaments were played during the season with Djokovic winning two of them. Daniil Medvedev won the third Masters event and ended the year by beating the top three players to clinch the ATP Finals title. Djokovic had a 41–5 match winning record, Nadal was 27–7 and Thiem was 25–9. Djokovic was 1–1 vs. both Thiem and Nadal, while Thiem was 2–0 vs. Nadal. Djokovic won four titles overall, Nadal two and Thiem one.
2021	Novak Djokovic (SRB)	Rankings: Djokovic finished the season as the ATP year-end No. 1 (ATP Player of the Year). In the ranking, Medvedev was No. 2, and Zverev No. 3.; Djokovic was named the ITF World Champion.; Year summary Novak Djokovic won three major singles titles and made the finals of all four tournaments. He won the Australian Open (defeated Daniil Medvedev in the final), French Open (defeated Stefanos Tsitsipas in the final), and Wimbledon (defeated Matteo Berrettini in the final). Medvedev won the US Open (defeated Djokovic in the final). Djokovic won five tournaments overall including one Masters title, Medvedev won four tournaments including one Masters title (he also won all his singles contests for the Russian team that won the ATP Cup and Davis Cup titles), and Zverev won six tournaments including the ATP Finals, the Olympics and two Masters titles. Djokovic had a 55–7 record (2–1 vs. Medvedev and 3–2 vs. Zverev), Medvedev had a 63–13 record (3–1 vs. Zverev) and Zverev a 59–15 record.
2022	Carlos Alcaraz (ESP) (ATP); Rafael Nadal (ESP) (ITF)	Rankings: Alcaraz finished the season as the ATP year-end No. 1 (ATP Player of the Year).; Nadal was named the ITF World Champion.; Year summary Rafael Nadal won the Australian Open (defeated Daniil Medvedev in the final) and also claimed the French Open for the record 14th time (defeated Casper Ruud in the final). Carlos Alcaraz won the US Open (defeated Ruud in the final) to win his first major title and become the youngest world No. 1 in ATP rankings history. Alcaraz won five tournaments overall including two Masters with a 57–13 record, while Nadal was 39–8 with four titles, but no Masters. They had a 1–1 record versus each other.
2023	Novak Djokovic (SRB)	Rankings: Djokovic finished the season as the ATP year-end No. 1 (ATP Player of the Year). In the ranking, Alcaraz was No. 2, and Medvedev No. 3.; Djokovic was named the ITF World Champion.; Year summary Novak Djokovic won three major titles and made the finals of all four tournaments. He won the Australian Open (defeating Stefanos Tsitsipas in the final), the French Open (defeating Casper Ruud in the final), the US Open (defeating Daniil Medvedev in the final) and also claimed the ATP Finals title for the record 7th time (defeating Jannik Sinner in the final). Carlos Alcaraz won Wimbledon (defeating Djokovic in the final). Djokovic, Alcaraz and Medvedev won two ATP Masters titles each.
2024	Jannik Sinner (ITA)	Rankings: Sinner finished the season as the ATP year-end No. 1 (ATP Player of the Year). In the ranking, Zverev was No. 2, and Alcaraz No. 3.; Sinner was named the ITF World Champion.; Year summary Jannik Sinner won two major titles and the ATP Finals. He won the Australian Open (defeating Daniil Medvedev in the final), the US Open (defeating Taylor Fritz in the final) and also claimed the ATP Finals title (defeating Fritz in the final). Carlos Alcaraz won the French Open (defeating Alexander Zverev in the final and Sinner in the SFs) and Wimbledon (defeating Novak Djokovic in the final). Sinner, Zverev, and Alcaraz won three, two, and one ATP Masters titles, respectively. Alcaraz won the Olympic Silver (lost Gold to Djokovic in the final; Zverev lost in the QFs; and Sinner was absent). Sinner and Alcaraz had a 3–0 record in the singles of Davis Cup (Sinner led his country to second successive triumph; and Zverev was absent). Alcaraz was 3–0 vs. Sinner and 2–2 vs. Zverev, while Sinner was 1–0 vs. Zverev.
2025	Carlos Alcaraz (ESP) (ATP); Jannik Sinner (ITA) (ITF)	Rankings: Alcaraz finished the season as the ATP year-end No. 1 (ATP Player of the Year). In the ranking, Sinner was No. 2.; Sinner was named the ITF World Champion.; Year summary Carlos Alcaraz and Jannik Sinner split the four major titles. Alcaraz won the French Open and US Open (defeating Sinner in both finals) while Sinner won the Australian Open (defeating Alexander Zverev in the final, Alcaraz lost in QFs) and Wimbledon (defeating Alcaraz in the final). Alcaraz and Sinner also met in the finals of the ATP Finals with Sinner emerging victorious. Alcaraz won three ATP Masters titles while Sinner won one. Overall Alcaraz was 4–2 vs. Sinner (2–1 at majors) (all finals). Alcaraz won 8 titles from 11 finals (out of 17 events) with a 71–9 record. Sinner won 6 titles from 10 finals (out of 12 events, as he could not play the full ATP calendar due to WADA suspension for three months period) with a 58–6 record.

== See also ==
- List of ATP number 1 ranked singles tennis players
- ITF World Champions
- Top ten ranked male tennis players
- Top ten ranked male tennis players (1912–1972)
- World number 1 ranked female tennis players

== Bibliography ==
- Brownlee, W. Methven (1889). Lawn Tennis. Bristol: Arrowsmith.
- Collins, Bud; Hollander, Zander (1994). Bud Collins' Modern Encyclopedia of Tennis. Gale Research. ISBN 978-0-8103-8988-5.
- Collins, Bud; Hollander, Zander (1997). Bud Collins' Tennis Encyclopedia (3rd ed.). Detroit: Visible Ink Press. ISBN 978-1-5785-9000-1.
- Collins, Bud (2010). The Bud Collins History of Tennis (2nd ed.). New York: New Chapter Press. ISBN 978-0-9422-5770-0.
- —— (2016). The Bud Collins History of Tennis (3rd ed.). New York: New Chapter Press. ISBN 978-1-9375-5938-0.
- Geist, Robert (1999). Der Grösste Meister. Die denkwürdige Karriere des australischen Tennisspielers Kenneth Robert Rosewall. This is a detailed account of Ken Rosewall's career with many statistics and, in particular, his annual rankings during his professional career.
- McCauley, Joe (2000). The History of Professional Tennis. Windsor: The Short Run Book Company Limited.
- Potter, E. C. (1963a). Kings of the Court. The story of lawn tennis. New York: Barnes and Company. ISBN 978-1-1255-7289-4. Has details about the pre–World War I players.
- Riggs, Bobby (1949). Tennis Is My Racket.. Riggs's autobiography has information about the 1946 professional tour that is slightly different from the other sources. He also writes at length about his 1948 tour with Kramer but says nothing about his playing record in 1947, about which there is much conflicting information.
- Shannon, Bill, ed. (1981). Official Encyclopedia of Tennis (3rd, revised and updated ed.). New York [u.a.]: Harper & Row. ISBN 978-0-0601-4896-6. OL 3785059M.
- Sutter, Michel (2003). Vainqueurs 1946–2003 [Winners 1946–2003]. Apparently based mostly on information drawn from the French sports magazine L'Équipe, this is an updated edition of his earlier book Vainqueurs 1946–1991. Both books list the winners of many professional tournaments and matches for the years shown in their titles, but the earlier book also listed the runner-ups, scores, and the exact dates as well as some commentary by the author for each year.
- Underwood, Peter (2019). The Pros: The Forgotten Era of Tennis. New Chapter Press. ISBN 978-1-9375-5991-5.
- Vaile, P. A. (1915). Modern Tennis (2nd ed.).
