= Masters Pro =

Defunct tennis tournament
- Founded: 1956
- Abolished: 1965
- Editions: 6
- Location: Los Angeles; United States
- Surface: Hard (cement)

The Masters Pro was a tournament open to men's tennis professionals. It was held between 1956 and 1959 and again between 1964 and 1965. The Ampol Masters at White City, Sydney was held in 1958. The tournament was played in a round robin format instead of the usual knockout competition on each of the six occasions that it was played in Los Angeles, and a knockout format when played at Sydney in 1958. At the 1964 and 1965 editions the round robin stage was followed by a semifinal and final round. The event was played on hard cement tennis court's at the L.A. Tennis Club, and on grass in 1958 at White City, Sydney.

== Finals ==
=== Singles ===
| Year | Date | Champion | Runner-up | Score |
|---|---|---|---|---|
| 1956 | July 27 - Aug 5 | (United States) Pancho Gonzales | (Australia) Frank Sedgman | (Round Robin) |
| 1957 | Jul 26 – Aug 3 | (United States) Pancho Gonzales | (Australia) Frank Sedgman | (Round Robin) |
| 1958 | Feb 1 - Feb 5 Sydney | (Australia) Frank Sedgman | (United States) Tony Trabert | 3-6, 4-6, 7-5, 6-3, 6-4 |
| 1958 | Jun 28 – Jul 6 L.A. | (Ecuador) Pancho Segura | (United States) Pancho Gonzales | (Round Robin) |
| 1959 | Jun 5 – 14 | (United States) Pancho Gonzales | (Australia) Lew Hoad | (Round Robin) |
| 1964 | Jun 1 – 8 | (Australia) Ken Rosewall | (Australia) Frank Sedgman | 6–2, 6–4 |
| 1965 | May 19 – 25 | (Australia) Rod Laver | (United States) Pancho Gonzales | 3–6, 6–3, 7–5 |

== See also ==
- Major professional tennis tournaments before the Open Era
