= Zander Hollander =

American sportswriter

- Born: Alexander Hollander; March 24, 1923; Brooklyn, New York, US
- Died: April 11, 2014 (aged 91); Manhattan, New York, US
- Occupations: Sportswriter; Journalist; Editor; Archivist
- Known for: The Baseball Book of Lists; The Book of Sports List; The Complete Handbook of Baseball; The Complete Handbook of Basketball; The Complete Handbook of Pro Football; The Complete Handbook of Pro Hockey; The Complete Encyclopedia of Hockey; The Baseball Book, Complete A-Z Encyclopedia of Baseball; The Home Run Story; Great American Athletes of the 20th Century; Modern Encyclopedia of Tennis; NBA Official Encyclopedia of Professional Basketball; Strange But True Football Stories
- Spouse: Phyllis (nee Rosen) Hollander
- Children: 2

Zander Hollander (March 24, 1923 – April 11, 2014) was an American sportswriter, journalist, editor and archivist. He served as a prolific supplier of encyclopedias on every major sport, editing, writing or packaging nearly 300 books over a professional career that spanned 45 years.

Born as Alexander Hollander in Brooklyn, New York, he grew up in Far Rockaway, Queens. At age 14, he found his emerging sports ability writing columns for a neighborhood newspaper, and then in high school, he wrote for the Long Island Daily Press and the New York World-Telegram. He later attended Queens College but left to serve in the Army Air Forces, assigned to an Army newspaper in Hawaii. After his discharge, he enrolled at City College of New York but did not graduate.

The heavy workload never really ended for Hollander. In 1955 he founded Associated Features, a company which produced booklets that were distributed with assorted promotional products, but it was not a lucrative enterprise. Even when immersed in several editorial projects, he would occasionally take a freelance shift on the Daily News sports desk.

After a stint with United Press International as an editor in New York, Hollander was hired as a sportswriter by the World-Telegram, originally to cover yachting. Before he committed full-time to his company in the mid-1960s, his day might consist of visiting potential clients and writing on a freelance basis for magazines, followed by phone calls to Western Union so he could meet the World-Telegram midnight deadline. Besides this, he reported for the Associated Press about his stay in the Soviet Union.

Hollander decided to quit newspapers in 1966, when he rejected an offer to work as editor of the World-Telegram and Sun, as it had become after merging with two other New York newspapers, the Herald Tribune and the Journal-American. He then turned his attention to his Associated Features business in the years to come.

From 1971 through 1997, Hollander found a niche in the bookstores by annually providing career statistics and profiles of players, team rosters, all-time records, articles with photos, scouting reports, schedules and predictions for the upcoming season, in the form of brick-size tomes, 400-plus pages, he titled Complete Handbooks. In them, he showed his experience and deep appreciation and knowledge of professional baseball, basketball, American football, hockey and soccer, as well as tennis, jai alai, and college basketball and football.

But the aforementioned yearbooks of Hollander were just one part of his multifaceted sports knowledge. He also chronicled sports bloopers and wrote a history of Madison Square Garden, among other subjects.

During his time as a journalist, he started a lifelong friendship with a then young lawyer, Howard Cosell, who represented the Little League of New York and had been asked by the local radio station WABC to host a show featuring youth ballplayers. Hollander agreed to collaborate by writing scripts and recruiting sports celebrities for the show. They were not paid for their services, but it was the beginning of a successful sports broadcasting career for Cosell.

In a 2001 interview, Hollander explained that as soon as he could hold a pencil and throw a ball, he dreamed of being a sportswriter. At the same time, he remembered that his first journalism effort was writing on a mimeographed newspaper in elementary school.

Hollander suffered from Alzheimer's disease during his later life. He died on April 11, 2014, in Manhattan, New York, at the age of 91.
