= 1906 Wimbledon Championships – Women's singles =

Women's singles
- 1906 Wimbledon Championships

Final
- Champion: (United Kingdom) Dorothea Douglass
- Runner-up: (United States) May Sutton
- Score: 6–3, 9–7

Details
- Draw: 48
- Seeds: –

Events
Singles	men	women
Doubles	men	women
← 1905 ·	Wimbledon Championships	· 1907 →

Dorothea Douglass defeated Charlotte Sterry 6–2, 6–2 in the All Comers' Final, and then defeated the reigning champion May Sutton 6–3, 9–7 in the challenge round to win the ladies' singles tennis title at the 1906 Wimbledon Championships.

== Draw ==
=== Key ===
- Q = Qualifier
- WC = Wild card
- LL = Lucky loser
- Alt = Alternate
- SE = Special exempt
- PR = Protected ranking
- ITF = ITF entry
- JE = Junior exempt
- w/o = Walkover
- r = Retired
- d = Defaulted
- SR = Special ranking

=== Challenge round ===
Challenge Round
(United Kingdom) Dorothea Douglass	6	9
(United States) May Sutton	3	7

=== All comers' finals ===
Quarterfinals
(United Kingdom) Winifred Longhurst	4	3
(United Kingdom) Dorothea Douglass	6	6
(United Kingdom) Beryl Tulloch	6	6
(United Kingdom) Blanche Hillyard	3	1
(United Kingdom) Violet Pinckney	4	2
(United Kingdom) Charlotte Sterry	6	6
(United Kingdom) Toupie Lowther	6	6
(United Kingdom) Gladys Eastlake-Smith	3	3

Semifinals
(United Kingdom) Dorothea Douglass	6	6
(United Kingdom) Beryl Tulloch	2	2
(United Kingdom) Charlotte Sterry	4	8	6
(United Kingdom) Toupie Lowther	6	6	4

Final
(United Kingdom) Dorothea Douglass	6	6
(United Kingdom) Charlotte Sterry	2	2

=== Top half ===
==== Section 1 ====
First round

Second round
(United Kingdom) Winifred Longhurst	6	6
(United Kingdom) R Elliott	2	3
(United Kingdom) Alice Greene
(United Kingdom) M Perceval	w/o
(United Kingdom) CHE Meyer	6	6
(United Kingdom) ME Brown	1	1
(United Kingdom) Dorothea Douglass	6	6
(United Kingdom) Ethel Thomson	2	1

Third round
(United Kingdom) W Longhurst	7	6
(United Kingdom) A Greene	5	4
(United Kingdom) CHE Meyer	3	1
(United Kingdom) D Douglass	6	6

Quarterfinals
(United Kingdom) W Longhurst	4	3
(United Kingdom) D Douglass	6	6

==== Section 2 ====
First round
(United Kingdom) Mrs Armstrong
(United Kingdom) A Andrews	w/o
(United Kingdom) Beryl Tulloch	6	6
(United Kingdom) Mrs CJ Snowden	3	3
(United Kingdom) EL Bosworth	6	6
(United Kingdom) S Benton	1	2
(United Kingdom) I Huleatt
(United Kingdom) EM Mayne	w/o
(United Kingdom) F Meyer
(United Kingdom) B Rowlandson	w/o
(United Kingdom) Blanche Hillyard	6	6
(United Kingdom) A Mooijaart	0	0
(United Kingdom) Edith Johnson	6	6
(United Kingdom) HI Harper	4	4
(United Kingdom) Mrs EB Hawker	6	6
(United Kingdom) CB Bell	4	1

Second round
(United Kingdom) Mrs Armstrong	w/o
(United Kingdom) B Tulloch
(United Kingdom) EL Bosworth	6	4	7
(United Kingdom) I Huleart	2	6	5
(United Kingdom) F Meyer	0	0
(United Kingdom) B Hillyard	6	6
(United Kingdom) E Johnson	6	6
(United Kingdom) Mrs EB Hawker	1	4

Third round
(United Kingdom) B Tulloch	6	6
(United Kingdom) EL Bosworth	0	3
(United Kingdom) B Hillyard	6	6
(United Kingdom) E Johnson	3	4

Quarterfinals
(United Kingdom) B Tulloch	6	6
(United Kingdom) B Hillyard	3	1

=== Bottom half ===
==== Section 3 ====
First round
(United Kingdom) EE Sargeant
(United Kingdom) BM Holder	w/o
(United Kingdom) Violet Pinckney	6	3	7
(United Kingdom) E.J. Bromfield	0	6	5
(United Kingdom) Hilda Lane	6	6
(United Kingdom) Winifred Slocock	1	1
(United Kingdom) Mildred Coles	6	6
(United Kingdom) Gertrude Houselander	2	4
(United Kingdom) Agnes Morton	6	6
(United Kingdom) M Bloxsome	1	1
(United Kingdom) Mabel Parton	6	6
(United Kingdom) Mary Whyte	1	2
(United Kingdom) Charlotte Sterry	8	6
(United Kingdom) Dora Boothby	6	2
(United Kingdom) Mrs PM Morton
(United Kingdom) K Kentish	w/o

Second round
(United Kingdom) EE Sargeant	1	4
(United Kingdom) V Pinckney	6	6
(United Kingdom) H Lane	6	6
(United Kingdom) M Coles	3	2
(United Kingdom) A Morton	6	6
(United Kingdom) M Parton	0	3
(United Kingdom) C Sterry	6	6
(United Kingdom) Mrs PM Morton	0	3

Third round
(United Kingdom) V Pinckney	7	6
(United Kingdom) H Lane	5	1
(United Kingdom) A Morton	0	3
(United Kingdom) C Sterry	6	6

Quarterfinals
(United Kingdom) V Pinckney	4	2
(United Kingdom) C Sterry	6	6

==== Section 4 ====
First round

Second round
(United Kingdom) Mrs C Bagenal
(United Kingdom) L Smith	w/o
(United Kingdom) Toupie Lowther	6	6
(United Kingdom) GM Carver	0	2
(United Kingdom) Edith Greville	6	6
(United Kingdom) Ruth Winch	2	2
(United Kingdom) Gladys Eastlake-Smith
(United Kingdom) C Cassel	w/o

Third round
(United Kingdom) Mrs C Bagenal	0	0
(United Kingdom) T Lowther	6	6
(United Kingdom) E Greville	2	3
(United Kingdom) G Eastlake-Smith	6	6

Quarterfinals
(United Kingdom) T Lowther	6	6
(United Kingdom) G Eastlake-Smith	3	3

Preceded by 1905 U.S. National Championships – Women's singles	Grand Slam women's singles	Succeeded by 1906 U.S. National Championships – Women's singles
