= 1908 Wimbledon Championships – Women's singles =

Women's singles
- 1908 Wimbledon Championships

Final
- Champion: (United Kingdom) Charlotte Sterry
- Runner-up: (United Kingdom) Agnes Morton
- Score: 6–4, 6–4

Details
- Draw: 30
- Seeds: –

Events
| Singles | men | women |
| Doubles | men | women |
| ← 1907 · | Wimbledon Championships | · 1909 → |

Charlotte Sterry defeated Agnes Morton 6–4, 6–4 in the all comers' final to win the ladies' singles tennis title at the 1908 Wimbledon Championships. The reigning champion May Sutton did not defend her title. She was the oldest ladies' singles champion, at 37 years and 282 days.

== Draw ==
=== Key ===
- Q = Qualifier
- WC = Wild card
- LL = Lucky loser
- Alt = Alternate
- SE = Special exempt
- PR = Protected ranking
- ITF = ITF entry
- JE = Junior exempt
- w/o = Walkover
- r = Retired
- d = Defaulted
- SR = Special ranking

=== All comers' finals ===
Quarterfinals
(United Kingdom) Dora Boothby | 6 | 6
(United Kingdom) Violet Pinckney | 1 | 4
(United Kingdom) Dorothea Lambert Chambers | 3 | 5
(United Kingdom) Charlotte Sterry | 6 | 7
(United Kingdom) Agnes Morton | 7 | 6
(United Kingdom) Beryl Tulloch | 5 | 1
(United Kingdom) Gladys Lamplough | 6 | 6
(United Kingdom) Agnes Tuckey | 3 | 1

Semifinals
(United Kingdom) Dora Boothby | 2 | 4
(United Kingdom) Charlotte Sterry | 6 | 6
(United Kingdom) Agnes Morton | 6 | 6
(United Kingdom) Gladys Lamplough | 3 | 4

Final
(United Kingdom) Charlotte Sterry | 6 | 6
(United Kingdom) Agnes Morton | 4 | 4

=== Top half ===
First round
(Germany) Clara von der Schulenburg | 6 | 6
(United Kingdom) EE Sargeant | 1 | 2
(United Kingdom) Mildred Coles | 6 | 6 | 6
(United Kingdom) Alice Greene | 8 | 3 | 4
(United Kingdom) Violet Pinckney | 6 | 6
(United Kingdom) EL Bloxworth | 3 | 2
(United Kingdom) Ruth Winch | 6 | 6
(United Kingdom) Mary Whyte | 4 | 2
(United Kingdom) Dorothea Lambert Chambers | 6 | 6
(United Kingdom) Mrs Paine | 0 | 0
(United Kingdom) Charlotte Sterry | 6 | 6
(United Kingdom) Mrs Perrett | 2 | 0
(United Kingdom) Constance Luard
(United Kingdom) N Stevens | w/o

Second round
(United Kingdom) Dora Boothby | 5 | 6 | 6
(Germany) C von der Schulenburg | 7 | 3 | 1
(United Kingdom) M Coles | 5 | 2
(United Kingdom) V Pinckney | 7 | 6
(United Kingdom) R Winch | 3 | 3
(United Kingdom) D Lambert Chambers | 6 | 6
(United Kingdom) C Sterry | 6 | 6
(United Kingdom) C Luard | 3 | 4

Quarterfinals
(United Kingdom) D Boothby | 6 | 6
(United Kingdom) V Pinckney | 1 | 4
(United Kingdom) D Lambert Chambers | 3 | 5
(United Kingdom) C Sterry | 6 | 7

Semifinals
(United Kingdom) D Boothby | 2 | 4
(United Kingdom) C Sterry | 6 | 6

=== Bottom half ===
First round
(United Kingdom) CB Bell
(United Kingdom) Edith Boucher | w/o
(United Kingdom) Agnes Morton | 2 | 6 | 6
(United Kingdom) Mabel Parton | 6 | 0 | 2
(United Kingdom) Blanche Hillyard | 6 | 6
(United Kingdom) Edith Johnson | 2 | 3
(United Kingdom) Beryl Tulloch | 6 | 6
(United Kingdom) HI Harper | 4 | 0
(United Kingdom) Madeline O'Neill | 4 | 6 | 6
(United Kingdom) Winifred McNair | 6 | 0 | 3
(United Kingdom) Gladys Lamplough | 6 | 6
(United Kingdom) AG Ransome | 1 | 2
(United Kingdom) Agnes Tuckey | 6 | 6
(United Kingdom) Mrs Armstrong | 1 | 2

Second round
(United Kingdom) CB Bell | w/o
(United Kingdom) A Morton
(United Kingdom) B Hillyard | 5 | 6 | 4
(United Kingdom) B Tulloch | 7 | 3 | 6
(United Kingdom) M O'Neill | 2 | 1
(United Kingdom) G Lamplough | 6 | 6
(United Kingdom) A Tuckey | 7 | 6
(United Kingdom) L Flemmich | 5 | 1

Quarterfinals
(United Kingdom) A Morton | 7 | 6
(United Kingdom) B Tulloch | 5 | 1
(United Kingdom) G Lamplough | 6 | 6
(United Kingdom) A Tuckey | 3 | 1

Semifinals
(United Kingdom) A Morton | 6 | 6
(United Kingdom) G Lamplough | 3 | 4

| Preceded by 1908 U.S. National Championships – Women's singles | Grand Slam women's singles | Succeeded by 1909 U.S. National Championships – Women's singles |
