= 1913 Wimbledon Championships – Women's singles =

Women's singles
- 1913 Wimbledon Championships

Final
- Champion: (United Kingdom) Dorothea Lambert Chambers
- Runner-up: (United Kingdom) Winifred McNair
- Score: 6–0, 6–4

Details
- Draw: 42
- Seeds: –

Events
Singles	men	women		boys	girls
Doubles	men	women	mixed	boys	girls
← 1912 ·	Wimbledon Championships	· 1914 →

Dorothea Lambert Chambers defeated Winifred McNair 6–0, 6–4 in the all comers' final to win the ladies' singles tennis title at the 1913 Wimbledon Championships. The reigning champion Ethel Larcombe did not defend her title.

This was the last time all eight quarter-finalists came from Europe until 2011.

== Draw ==
=== Key ===
- Q = Qualifier
- WC = Wild card
- LL = Lucky loser
- Alt = Alternate
- ITF = ITF entry
- PR = Protected ranking
- SR = Special ranking
- SE = Special exempt
- JE = Junior exempt
- JR = Junior Accelerator Programme entrant
- CO = College Accelerator Programme entrant
- NG = Next Gen Accelerator Program entrant
- w/o = Walkover
- r = Retired
- d = Defaulted

=== All comers' finals ===
Quarterfinals
(United Kingdom) Charlotte Sterry	6	4	7
(United Kingdom) Winifred McNair	0	6	9
(United Kingdom) Dorothy Holman	6	6
(United Kingdom) Phyllis Satterthwaite	4	1
(United Kingdom) Mildred Coles	1	0
(United Kingdom) Dorothea Lambert Chambers	6	6
(United Kingdom) Madeline O'Neill	2	0
(United Kingdom) Helen Aitchison	6	6

Semifinals
(United Kingdom) Winifred McNair	2	6	7
(United Kingdom) Dorothy Holman	6	2	5
(United Kingdom) Dorothea Lambert Chambers	6	6
(United Kingdom) Helen Aitchison	2	3

Final
(United Kingdom) Winifred McNair	0	4
(United Kingdom) Dorothea Lambert Chambers	6	6

=== Top half ===
==== Section 1 ====
First round

Second round
(United Kingdom) Charlotte Sterry	4	6	6
(United Kingdom) Blanche Colston	6	2	2
(United Kingdom) Edith Hannam	4	6	6
(United Kingdom) Blanche Bingley	6	2	0
(United Kingdom) Edith Greville	6	5	6
(United Kingdom) Mrs Perrett	0	7	2
(United Kingdom) Winifred McNair	6	6
(United Kingdom) J Coles	1	0

Third round
(United Kingdom) C Sterry	6	2	6
(United Kingdom) E Hannam	1	6	2
(United Kingdom) E Greville	3	2
(United Kingdom) W McNair	6	6

Quarterfinals
(United Kingdom) C Sterry	6	4	7
(United Kingdom) W McNair	0	6	9

==== Section 2 ====
First round
(United Kingdom) Aurea Edgington	6	6
(United Kingdom) Mrs AA Hall	1	3
(Germany) Mieken Rieck	6	6
(United Kingdom) BM Warren	1	1
(United Kingdom) Hilda Lane	6	6
(United Kingdom) Eleanor Rose	3	3
(United Kingdom) Dora Boothby	6	4	6
(United States) Elizabeth Ryan	4	6	3
(United Kingdom) Phyllis Satterthwaite	7	6
(United Kingdom) Olive Manser	5	1

Second round
(United Kingdom) Mrs Nesham	10	6
(United Kingdom) GB Foster	8	1
(United Kingdom) Dorothy Holman	4	6	6
(United Kingdom) A Edgington	6	2	1
(Germany) M Rieck	2	6	6
(United Kingdom) H Lane	6	1	2
(United Kingdom) D Boothby	3	4
(United Kingdom) P Satterthwaite	6	6

Third round
(United Kingdom) Mrs Nesham	1	0
(United Kingdom) D Holman	6	6
(Germany) M Rieck	1	2
(United Kingdom) P Satterthwaite	6	6

Quarterfinals
(United Kingdom) D Holman	6	6
(United Kingdom) P Satterthwaite	4	1

=== Bottom half ===
==== Section 3 ====
First round
(United Kingdom) Beryl Tulloch
(United Kingdom) Mrs CE Hunter	w/o
(United Kingdom) Marie Hazel	6	6	6
(United Kingdom) Mrs WE Hudleston	3	8	2
(United Kingdom) Winifred Beamish
(United Kingdom) Edith Johnson	w/o
(United Kingdom) Mildred Coles	7	6
(United Kingdom) M Brooksmith	5	2
(United Kingdom) Agnes Morton	6	6
(United Kingdom) Gladys Lamplough	2	4

Second round
(United Kingdom) B Tulloch	2	7	7
(United Kingdom) M Hazel	6	5	5
(United Kingdom) W Beamish	9	6	4
(United Kingdom) M Coles	7	8	6
(United Kingdom) A Morton	6	6
(United Kingdom) KM Allen	1	2
(United Kingdom) Dorothea Lambert Chambers	6	6
(United Kingdom) Agnes Tuckey	2	3

Third round
(United Kingdom) B Tulloch	2	0
(United Kingdom) M Coles	6	6
(United Kingdom) A Morton	1	3
(United Kingdom) D Lambert Chambers	6	6

Quarterfinals
(United Kingdom) M Coles	1	0
(United Kingdom) D Lambert Chambers	6	6

==== Section 4 ====
First round

Second round
(United Kingdom) Madeline O'Neill	6	1	6
(United Kingdom) Mabel Parton	4	6	2
(United Kingdom) Vera Spofforth	6	6
(United Kingdom) BMS Lee	3	2
(United Kingdom) Helen Aitchison	7	6	6
(United Kingdom) Jessie Greene	9	0	0
(United Kingdom) Tessa Hall
(United Kingdom) D. Boadle	w/o

Third round
(United Kingdom) M O'Neill	6	6
(United Kingdom) V Spofforth	2	3
(United Kingdom) H Aitchison	6	6
(United Kingdom) T Hall	1	2

Quarterfinals
(United Kingdom) M O'Neill	2	0
(United Kingdom) H Aitchison	6	6

Preceded by 1913 U.S. National Championships – Women's singles	Grand Slam women's singles	Succeeded by 1914 U.S. National Championships – Women's singles
