= 1909 Wimbledon Championships – Women's singles =

Women's singles
- 1909 Wimbledon Championships

Final
- Champion: (United Kingdom) Dora Boothby
- Runner-up: (United Kingdom) Agnes Morton
- Score: 6–4, 4–6, 8–6

Details
- Draw: 37
- Seeds: –

Events
Singles	men	women
Doubles	men	women
← 1908 ·	Wimbledon Championships	· 1910 →

Dora Boothby defeated Agnes Morton 6–4, 4–6, 8–6 in the all comers' final to win the ladies' singles tennis title at the 1909 Wimbledon Championships. The reigning champion Charlotte Sterry did not defend her title.

== Draw ==
=== Key ===
- Q = Qualifier
- WC = Wild card
- LL = Lucky loser
- Alt = Alternate
- SE = Special exempt
- PR = Protected ranking
- ITF = ITF entry
- JE = Junior exempt
- w/o = Walkover
- r = Retired
- d = Defaulted
- SR = Special ranking

=== All comers' finals ===
Quarterfinals
(United Kingdom) Madeline O'Neill	5	4
(United Kingdom) Aurea Edgington	7	6
(United Kingdom) Edith Johnson	0	3
(United Kingdom) Agnes Morton	6	6
(United Kingdom) Mabel Parton	3	4
(United Kingdom) Maude Garfit	6	6
(United Kingdom) Dora Boothby	6	3
(United Kingdom) Helen Aitchison	4	0^{r}

Semifinals
(United Kingdom) Aurea Edgington	0	2
(United Kingdom) Agnes Morton	6	6
(United Kingdom) Maude Garfit	2	1
(United Kingdom) Dora Boothby	6	6

Final
(United Kingdom) Agnes Morton	4	6	6
(United Kingdom) Dora Boothby	6	4	8

=== Top half ===
==== Section 1 ====
First round

Second round
(United Kingdom) Mrs LR Hausberg
(United Kingdom) Winifred Longhurst	w/o
(United Kingdom) Madeline O'Neill
(United Kingdom) CB Bell	w/o
(United Kingdom) M Brooksmith
(United Kingdom) Mrs V Woodhouse	w/o
(United Kingdom) Aurea Edgington	6	6
(United Kingdom) Blanche Hillyard	3	4

Third round
(United Kingdom) Mrs LR Hausberg	3	4
(United Kingdom) M O'Neill	6	6
(United Kingdom) M Brooksmith	w/o
(United Kingdom) A Edgington

Quarterfinals
(United Kingdom) M O'Neill	5	4
(United Kingdom) A Edgington	7	6

==== Section 2 ====
First round
(United Kingdom) Agnes Morton	6	5	7
(United Kingdom) J Tripp	2	7	5
(United Kingdom) AG Ransome
(United Kingdom) Mrs Armstrong	w/o
(United Kingdom) Ruth Winch	6	6
(United Kingdom) M Bloxsome	0	1

Second round
(United Kingdom) Edith Johnson	6	7
(Norway) Molla Bjurstedt	1	5
(United Kingdom) E.J. Bromfield	6	6
(United Kingdom) Mrs DK Hole	4	0
(United Kingdom) Mrs Robinson	0	0
(United Kingdom) A Morton	6	6
(United Kingdom) AG Ransome	2	3
(United Kingdom) R Winch	6	6

Third round
(United Kingdom) E Johnson	6	6
(United Kingdom) EJ Bromfield	3	4
(United Kingdom) A Morton	5	6	8
(United Kingdom) R Winch	7	3	6

Quarterfinals
(United Kingdom) E Johnson	0	3
(United Kingdom) A Morton	6	6

=== Bottom half ===
==== Section 3 ====
First round
(United Kingdom) EC Attfield	2	6	6
(United Kingdom) L Boustead	6	2	2
(United Kingdom) Mabel Parton
(United Kingdom) L Everts	w/o

Second round
(United Kingdom) EC Attfield	3	2
(United Kingdom) M Parton	6	6
(United Kingdom) Hilda Lane	5	6	7
(United Kingdom) Winifred McNair	7	1	5
(United Kingdom) Maude Garfit
(United Kingdom) W Evens	w/o
(United Kingdom) Beryl Tulloch	6	6
(United Kingdom) EE Sargeant	0	2

Third round
(United Kingdom) M Parton	6	6
(United Kingdom) H Lane	3	3
(United Kingdom) M Garfit	6	3	6
(United Kingdom) B Tulloch	4	6	4

Quarterfinals
(United Kingdom) M Parton	3	4
(United Kingdom) M Garfit	6	6

==== Section 4 ====
First round

Second round
(United Kingdom) Dora Boothby	6	6
(United Kingdom) Alice Greene	4	2
(United Kingdom) Mildred Coles	1	6	6
(United Kingdom) M Messom	6	1	3
(United Kingdom) Helen Aitchison	6	4	7
(United Kingdom) Edith Greville	2	6	5
(United Kingdom) Agnes Tuckey	6	6
(United Kingdom) VER Aitken	0	2

Third round
(United Kingdom) D Boothby	6	6
(United Kingdom) M Coles	2	4
(United Kingdom) H Aitchison	4	6	13
(United Kingdom) A Tuckey	6	1	11

Quarterfinals
(United Kingdom) D Boothby	6	3
(United Kingdom) H Aitchison	4	0^{r}

Preceded by 1909 U.S. National Championships – Women's singles	Grand Slam women's singles	Succeeded by 1910 U.S. National Championships – Women's singles
