= 1910 Wimbledon Championships – Women's singles =

Women's singles
- 1910 Wimbledon Championships

Final
- Champion: (United Kingdom) Dorothea Lambert Chambers
- Runner-up: (United Kingdom) Dora Boothby
- Score: 6–2, 6–2

Details
- Draw: 33
- Seeds: –

Events
Singles	men	women
Doubles	men	women
← 1909 ·	Wimbledon Championships	· 1911 →

Dorothea Lambert Chambers defeated Edith Johnson 6–4, 6–2 in the All Comers' Final, and then defeated the reigning champion Dora Boothby 6–2, 6–2 in the challenge round to win the ladies' singles tennis title at the 1910 Wimbledon Championships.

== Draw ==
=== Key ===
- Q = Qualifier
- WC = Wild card
- LL = Lucky loser
- Alt = Alternate
- SE = Special exempt
- PR = Protected ranking
- ITF = ITF entry
- JE = Junior exempt
- w/o = Walkover
- r = Retired
- d = Defaulted
- SR = Special ranking

=== Challenge round ===
Challenge Round
(United Kingdom) Dorothea Lambert Chambers	6	6
(United Kingdom) Dora Boothby	2	2

=== Finals ===
Quarterfinals
(Denmark) Sofie Castenschiold	9	4	3
(United Kingdom) Gladys Lamplough	7	6	6
(United Kingdom) Edith Johnson	7	6
(United Kingdom) Mabel Parton	5	4
(United Kingdom) Helen Aitchison	2	1
(United Kingdom) Dorothea Lambert Chambers	6	6
(United Kingdom) Aurea Edgington	6	3	3
(United Kingdom) Winifred McNair	2	6	6

Semifinals
(United Kingdom) Gladys Lamplough	6	0	3
(United Kingdom) Edith Johnson	1	6	6
(United Kingdom) Dorothea Lambert Chambers	6	6
(United Kingdom) Winifred McNair	1	0

Final
(United Kingdom) Edith Johnson	4	2
(United Kingdom) Dorothea Lambert Chambers	6	6

=== Top half ===
==== Section 1 ====
First round

Second round
(Denmark) Sofie Castenschiold
(United Kingdom) Mrs Armstrong	w/o
(United Kingdom) Madeline O'Neill	1	6	6
(United Kingdom) Mrs V Tabbush	6	4	0
(United Kingdom) Gladys Lamplough
(United Kingdom) Mrs F Good	w/o
(United Kingdom) Beryl Tulloch
(United Kingdom) Mrs LR Hausberg	w/o

Third round
(Denmark) S Castenschiold	6	6
(United Kingdom) M O'Neill	3	3
(United Kingdom) G Lamplough
(United Kingdom) B Tulloch	w/o

Quarterfinals
(Denmark) S Castenschiold	9	4	3
(United Kingdom) G Lamplough	7	6	6

==== Section 2 ====
First round
(United Kingdom) M Messom	6	6
(United Kingdom) Winifred Ramsay	4	2

Second round
(United Kingdom) Dorothy Holman	6	6
(United Kingdom) E Peterson	0	2
(United Kingdom) Edith Johnson	6	6
(United States) Mrs FG Schmitz	3	4
(United Kingdom) Mabel Parton	6	7
(United Kingdom) Mildred Coles	4	5
(United Kingdom) Olive Manser	6	6
(United Kingdom) M Messom	1	1

Third round
(United Kingdom) D Holman	7	0	0
(United Kingdom) E Johnson	5	6	6
(United Kingdom) M Parton	6	8
(United Kingdom) O Manser	2	6

Quarterfinals
(United Kingdom) E Johnson	7	6
(United Kingdom) M Parton	5	4

=== Bottom half ===
==== Section 3 ====
First round

Second round
(United Kingdom) AG Ransome	6	6
(United Kingdom) M Boadle	3	1
(United Kingdom) Helen Aitchison	6	6
(United Kingdom) M Brooksmith	4	3
(United Kingdom) VER Aitken
(United Kingdom) J Tripp	w/o
(United Kingdom) Dorothea Lambert Chambers	6	6
(United Kingdom) Mrs Nesham	1	0

Third round
(United Kingdom) AG Ransome	1	3
(United Kingdom) H Aitchison	6	6
(United Kingdom) VER Aitken	1	0
(United Kingdom) D Lambert Chambers	6	6

Quarterfinals
(United Kingdom) H Aitchison	2	1
(United Kingdom) D Lambert Chambers	6	6

==== Section 4 ====
First round

Second round
(United Kingdom) Aurea Edgington
(United Kingdom) Charlotte Sterry	w/o
(United Kingdom) D. Boadle	9	6
(United Kingdom) L Flemmich	7	4
(United Kingdom) Blanche Hillyard	6	6
(United Kingdom) VEM Evans	1	1
(United Kingdom) Winifred McNair	1	6	6
(United Kingdom) Rosamund Salusbury	6	4	1

Third round
(United Kingdom) A Edgington	6	6
(United Kingdom) D. Boadle	1	4
(United Kingdom) B Hillyard	7	3	3
(United Kingdom) W McNair	5	6	6

Quarterfinals
(United Kingdom) A Edgington	6	3	3
(United Kingdom) W McNair	2	6	6

Preceded by 1910 U.S. National Championships – Women's singles	Grand Slam women's singles	Succeeded by 1911 U.S. National Championships – Women's singles
