= 1911 Wimbledon Championships – Women's singles =

Women's singles
- 1911 Wimbledon Championships

Final
- Champion: (United Kingdom) Dorothea Lambert Chambers
- Runner-up: (United Kingdom) Dora Boothby
- Score: 6–0, 6–0

Details
- Draw: 34
- Seeds: –

Events
Singles	men	women
Doubles	men	women
← 1910 ·	Wimbledon Championships	· 1912 →

Dora Boothby defeated Edith Hannam 6–2, 7–5 in the All Comers' Final, but the reigning champion Dorothea Lambert Chambers defeated Boothby 6–0, 6–0 in the challenge round to win the ladies' singles tennis title at the 1911 Wimbledon Championships.

== Draw ==
=== Key ===
- Q = Qualifier
- WC = Wild card
- LL = Lucky loser
- Alt = Alternate
- SE = Special exempt
- PR = Protected ranking
- ITF = ITF entry
- JE = Junior exempt
- w/o = Walkover
- r = Retired
- d = Defaulted
- SR = Special ranking

=== Challenge round ===
Challenge Round
(United Kingdom) Dora Boothby	0	0
(United Kingdom) Dorothea Lambert Chambers	6	6

=== All comers' finals ===
Quarterfinals
(United Kingdom) Edith Hannam	6	4	7
(United Kingdom) Mildred Coles	4	6	5
(United Kingdom) Helen Aitchison	6	6
(United Kingdom) Marie Hazel	0	3
(United Kingdom) Aurea Edgington	2	4
(United Kingdom) Dora Boothby	6	6
(United Kingdom) Mabel Parton	6	8
(United Kingdom) Dorothy Holman	0	6

Semifinals
(United Kingdom) Edith Hannam	6	6	7
(United Kingdom) Helen Aitchison	3	8	5
(United Kingdom) Dora Boothby	6	6
(United Kingdom) Mabel Parton	3	4

Final
(United Kingdom) Edith Hannam	2	5
(United Kingdom) Dora Boothby	6	7

=== Top half ===
==== Section 1 ====
First round

Second round
(United Kingdom) Edith Hannam
(United Kingdom) EC Attfield	w/o
(United Kingdom) Madeline O'Neill
(United Kingdom) Charlotte Sterry	w/o
(United Kingdom) Mildred Coles
(United Kingdom) Miss Dudley	w/o
(United Kingdom) Una Gracey
(United Kingdom) Mrs Ritchie	w/o

Third round
(United Kingdom) E Hannam	6	6
(United Kingdom) M O'Neill	1	1
(United Kingdom) M Coles	6	6
(United Kingdom) U Gracey	1	1

Quarterfinals
(United Kingdom) E Hannam	6	4	7
(United Kingdom) M Coles	4	6	5

==== Section 2 ====
First round
(United Kingdom) Marie Hazel	4	6	6
(United Kingdom) Beryl Tulloch	6	4	4

Second round
(United Kingdom) Helen Aitchison	6	6
(United Kingdom) E Dillon	1	3
(United Kingdom) Agnes Morton	6	6
(Germany) Mieken Rieck	2	4
(United Kingdom) Rosamund Salusbury
(United Kingdom) D Elliadi	w/o
(United Kingdom) Winifred Ramsay	2	5
(United Kingdom) M Hazel	6	7

Third round
(United Kingdom) H Aitchison	6	0
(United Kingdom) A Morton	4	0^{r}
(United Kingdom) RV Salusbury
(United Kingdom) M Hazel	w/o

Quarterfinals
(United Kingdom) H Aitchison	6	6
(United Kingdom) M Hazel	0	3

=== Bottom half ===
==== Section 3 ====
First round
(United Kingdom) Aurea Edgington
(United Kingdom) Eileen Antrobus	w/o

Second round
(United Kingdom) A Edgington	6	6
(United Kingdom) Hilda Lane	4	3
(United Kingdom) Phyllis Carr	7	6	8
(United Kingdom) M Dillon	9	3	6
(United Kingdom) Edith Johnson	6	6
(United Kingdom) Domini Crosfield	4	2
(United Kingdom) Dora Boothby	6	8
(Denmark) Sofie Castenschiold	3	6

Third round
(United Kingdom) A Edgington	8	6
(United Kingdom) P Carr	6	4
(United Kingdom) E Johnson	3	3
(United Kingdom) D Boothby	6	6

Quarterfinals
(United Kingdom) A Edgington	2	4
(United Kingdom) D Boothby	6	6

==== Section 4 ====
First round

Second round
(United Kingdom) Mabel Parton	6	6
(United Kingdom) Mrs A Lent	2	2
(United Kingdom) Winifred McNair	6	6
(United Kingdom) Mrs E Bousfield	2	2
(United Kingdom) Vera Spofforth
(United Kingdom) Mrs R Armstrong	w/o
(United Kingdom) Dorothy Holman	6	6
(United Kingdom) Betty Nutcombe Quicke	0	2

Third round
(United Kingdom) M Parton	6	7
(United Kingdom) W McNair	2	5
(United Kingdom) V Spofforth	1	0
(United Kingdom) D Holman	6	6

Quarterfinals
(United Kingdom) M Parton	6	8
(United Kingdom) D Holman	0	6

Preceded by 1910 U.S. National Championships – Women's singles	Grand Slam women's singles	Succeeded by 1911 U.S. National Championships – Women's singles
