= East Grinstead Open =

Defunct tennis tournament
- Tour: British Circuit (1888-1912); ILTF Circuit (1913-1939)
- Founded: 1882
- Editions: 1939
- Location: East Grinstead, West Sussex, England
- Venue: East Grinstead LTCC
- Surface: Grass (outdoor)

The East Grinstead Open was a combined grass court tennis tournament held at the East Grinstead Lawn Tennis and Croquet Club(f.1882), East Grinstead, West Sussex, England from 1882 to 1939.

== History ==
The East Grinstead Open tournament was a men's and women's grass court tennis tournament first staged around 1882 at East Grinstead, West Sussex, England. In 1928 the East Grinstead Open had 128 entries for the gentlemen's singles event. The first winner of the men's singles was England's William Nevill Cobbold. The first winner of the women's event was England's Mrs Baddington. The final known edition was in 1939 the men's singles event was won by New Zealands's Alistair Dewar-Brown. and the women's singles title was won by Hungary's Suzy Kormoczy. It was a featured regular series category event on the ILTF Circuit from 1913 to 1939.

Notable winners of this tournament included in the men's singles; William Nevill Cobbold (1882, 1883, 1887), Charles Lacy Sweet (1884), James Dwight (1885), Wilfred Baddeley (1888), Herbert Baddeley (1889), Roy Allen (1904, 1909), Major Ritchie (1911), Gordon Lowe (1912), Brame Hillyard (1924), Paul Barrelet De Ricou(1927), Donald Leahong (1930), Vernon Kirby (1937) and Ian Collins (1938).

Former notable winners of women's singles title included; Blanche Bingley (1885), Hilda Lane (1903–06, 1908–09, 1911–13), Dorothy Holman (1921–1925), Joan Ridley (1928–30), Geraldine Ramsey Beamish (1931) and Ermyntrude Harvey (1935–36, 1938).

== Finals ==
=== Men's Singles ===
(incomplete roll)

Year	Winner	Runner-up	Score
1882	(England) Nevill Cobbold	(England) Percy Wallis	6–0, 6–3
1883	(England) Nevill Cobbold (2)	(Scotland) James Agnew	6–3, 6–5
1884	(England) Charles Lacy Sweet	(United Kingdom) L.G. Campbell	6–2, 6–3, 6–3
1885	(United States) James Dwight	(England) Nevill Cobbold	6–2, 6–3, 6–4
1886	(United Kingdom) Charles Ross	(United Kingdom) W.E. Seldon	6–3, 6–2
1887	(England) Nevill Cobbold (3)	(England) William Down	6–4, 6–2
1888	(United Kingdom) Wilfred Baddeley	(England) W.E. Seldon	7–5, 6–3
1889	(United Kingdom) Herbert Baddeley	(England) Wilberforce Eaves	6–1, 7–5
1904	(United Kingdom) Roy Allen	(United Kingdom) George Orme	6–4, 4–1 ret.
1905	(United Kingdom) Roderick McNair	(United Kingdom) Reggie Doherty	walkover
1906	(United Kingdom) Roy Allen (2)	(United Kingdom) Alfred Beamish	6–1, 6–1
1908	(United Kingdom) Roy Allen (3)	(United Kingdom) Peter Hicks	6–2, 6–2
1909	(United Kingdom) Roy Allen (4)	(United Kingdom) Frank Roe	10–8, 6–2
1910	(United Kingdom) Roy Allen (5)	(United Kingdom) George Partridge	6–0, 6–2, 6–0
1911	(United Kingdom) Major Ritchie	(United Kingdom) Roy Allen	default
1912	(United Kingdom) Gordon Lowe	(United Kingdom) J. Herbert Crispe	?
1913	(United Kingdom) James Zimmermann	(United Kingdom) Gordon Lowe	4–6, 6–4, 6–3, 5–7, 6–3,
1914	(United Kingdom) George Greville	(Denmark) Erik Larsen	6–2, 6–2, 6–3
1915/1919	(Not held due to WWI)		
1920	(United Kingdom) N. Field	(United Kingdom) S. Leslie	6–2, 6–2
1921	(United Kingdom) D. Browne	(United Kingdom) Jack Hillyard	7–5, 4–6, 6–2
1922	(United Kingdom) George Colding	(United Kingdom) H.W. Carruthers	6–3, 3–6, 6–0
1923	(United Kingdom) Jack Hillyard	(United Kingdom) D. Browne	6–0, 6–2
1924	(United Kingdom) Brame Hillyard	(United Kingdom) D.L. Morgan	6–2, 6–2, 6–4
1925	(India) Sydney Jacob	(United Kingdom) John Progsin-Smith	6–3, 6–3
1926	(United Kingdom) H.G.C. Fowler	(United Kingdom) George Colding	6–4, 4–6, 6–4, 6–8, 6–4
1927	(France) Paul Barrelet de Ricou	(France) Claude Barrelet de Ricou	6–3, 0–6, 6–1, 6–4
1928	(United Kingdom) Ralph Wackett	(United States) John Millen	6–3, 6–4, 6–4
1929	(United States) John Millen	(Jamaica) Donald Leahong	7–5, 6–3, 6–3
1930	(Jamaica) Donald Leahong	(United Kingdom) Jimmy Jones	6–4, 6–4, 6–4
1931	(United Kingdom) W.A.R. Collins	(United Kingdom) B.W. Hone	divided title.
1932	(United Kingdom) G.F. Mathieson	(United States) Grady Frank	4–6, 6–2, 10–8
1933	(United Kingdom) A. Baird Murray	(United Kingdom) Bob Tinkler	6–4, 6–2
1934	(United States) Grady Frank	(United Kingdom) Malcom Young	6–3, 6–2, 6–4
1935	(United Kingdom) Charles Fawcus	(United Kingdom) Malcom Young	2–6, 4–6, 6–3, 6–3, 6–4
1936	(United Kingdom) John Collins	(United Kingdom) David Williams	3–6, 6–4, 6–3
1937	(South Africa) Vernon Kirby	(United Kingdom) John Collins	6–0, 6–3
1938	(United Kingdom) Ian Collins	(United Kingdom) G.F. Mathieson	6–3, 6–2
1939	(New Zealand) Alistair Dewar-Brown	(United Kingdom) Ian Collins	6–0, 6–0

=== Women's Singles ===
(incomplete Roll)

Year	Winner	Runner-up	Score
1882	(England) Mrs Baddington	(England) May Arbuthnot	6–1, 6–5
1884	(England) Miss Cobbold	(United Kingdom) Ada Strapp	6–1, 6–4
1885	(United Kingdom) Blanche Bingley	(United Kingdom) Edith Davies	6–2, 5–7, 6–3
1886	(United Kingdom) Miss Cobbold (2)	(United Kingdom) May Jacks	3–6, 6–1, 6–1
1887	(United Kingdom) Miss Cobbold (3)	(United Kingdom) May Arbuthnot	6–3, 6–3
1888	(United Kingdom) Ivy Arbuthnot	(United Kingdom) May Arbuthnot	divided title
1889	(United Kingdom) Ivy Arbuthnot (2)	(United Kingdom) May Arbuthnot	divided title
1903	(United Kingdom) Hilda Lane	(United Kingdom) Marion Clark	walkover
1904	(United Kingdom) Hilda Lane (2)	(United Kingdom) Ethel Attfield	6–1, 6–2
1905	(United Kingdom) Hilda Lane (3)	(United Kingdom) Gladys Eastlake-Smith	2–6, 6–4, 6–3
1906	(United Kingdom) Hilda Lane (4)	(United Kingdom) Gladys Eastlake-Smith	14–16, 6–1, 8–6
1907	(United Kingdom) Mildred Brooksmith	(United Kingdom) M. Parsons	6–4, 6–1
1908	(United Kingdom) Hilda Lane (5)	(United Kingdom) Amy Wilson	7–5, 5–7, 7–5
1909	(United Kingdom) Mildred Coles	(United Kingdom) Hilda Lane	4–6, 6–1, 9–7
1910	(United Kingdom) Edith Greville	(United Kingdom) Mildred Brooksmith	6–1, 6–1
1911	(United Kingdom) Hilda Lane (6)	(United Kingdom) Mildred Coles	6–2, 6–3
1912	(United Kingdom) Hilda Lane (7)	(United Kingdom) Edith Greville	6–8, 7–5, 6–3
1913	(United Kingdom) Hilda Lane (8)	(United Kingdom) Jessie Tripp	6–4, 1–6, 7–5
1914	(United Kingdom) Edith Greville (2)	(United Kingdom) Jessie Tripp	6–4, 6–0
1915/1919	(Not held due to world war one)		
1920	(United Kingdom) Olive Manser	(United Kingdom) Aurea Edgington	4–6, 6–2, 6–3
1921	(United Kingdom) Dorothy Holman	(United Kingdom) Olive Manser	6–2, 6–2
1922	(United Kingdom) Dorothy Holman (2)	(United Kingdom) Olive Manser	9–7, 6–3
1923	(United Kingdom) Dorothy Holman (3)	(United Kingdom) Phyllis Satterthwaite	w.o.
1924	(United Kingdom) Dorothy Holman (4)	(United Kingdom) Annie Cobb	6–4, 6–4
1925	(United Kingdom) Dorothy Holman (5)	(United Kingdom) Elsie Goldsack	8–6, 6–3
1926	(United Kingdom) Mrs N. Godfrey	(United Kingdom) Dorothy Holman	6–4, 11–9
1927	(United Kingdom) Mary Cambridge	(United Kingdom) Aurea Edgington	6–4, 7–5
1928	(United Kingdom) Joan Ridley	(United Kingdom) Phyllis Mudford	9–7, 6–0
1929	(United Kingdom) Joan Ridley (2)	(United Kingdom) Ermyntrude Harvey	7–5, 3–6, 6–4
1930	(United Kingdom) Joan Ridley (3)	(United Kingdom) Helen Bourne	6–3, 6–3
1931	(United Kingdom) Geraldine Beamish	(United Kingdom) Elisabeth Macready	divided title
1932	(United Kingdom) Elisabeth Macready	(United Kingdom) Geraldine Beamish	4–6, 6–2, 6–2
1933	(United Kingdom) Phyllis King	(United Kingdom) Elisabeth Macready	6–3, 6–0
1934	(United Kingdom) Phyllis King (2)	(United Kingdom) Elisabeth Macready	walkover
1935	(United Kingdom) Ermyntrude Harvey	(United Kingdom) Judith Backhouse	6–3, 7–5
1936	(United Kingdom) Ermyntrude Harvey (2)	(United Kingdom) Josephine Harman	6–2, 2–6, 7–5
1937	(United Kingdom) Olga MacInnes	(United Kingdom) Ermyntrude Harvey	8–6, 6–1
1938	(United Kingdom) Ermyntrude Harvey (3)	(United Kingdom) Doreen Pleydell-Bouverie	6–4, 6–1
1939	(Hungary) Suzy Kormoczy	(United Kingdom) Ermyntrude Harvey	6–1, 9–7
