= British Covered Court Championships =

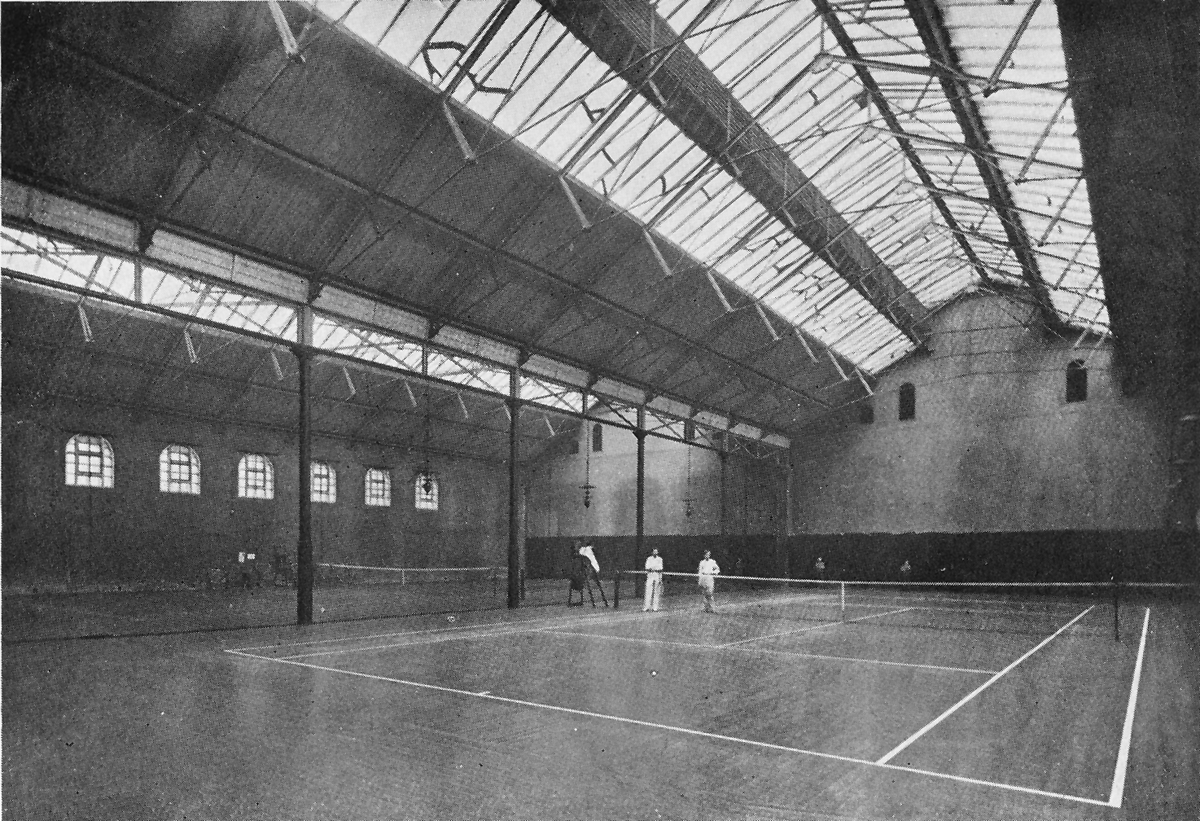

Defunct tennis tournament
- Tour: Grand Prix circuit (1970–1971)
- Founded: 1885
- Abolished: 1971
- Editions: 72
- Location: London, England
- Venue: Hyde Park (1885–1894); Queen's Club (1895–1971)
- Surface: Wood / indoor

The British Covered Court Championships (BCCC) was an indoor tennis event held from 1885 through 1971 and played in London, England. The tournament dates fluctuated between October and March.

== History ==
The first five editions of the tournament were held at the Hyde Park Lawn Tennis Club in Porchester Square, London and consisted only of a men's singles competition. In 1890 it was decided to add a women's singles and men's doubles competition and the tournament moved to the Queen's Club in London, although the men's singles remained at Hyde Park until 1895. The mixed doubles event was added to the championships in 1898. A third court was added to the championships in 1912, and, like the original two courts, it had a wooden surface. In 1923, the Challenge Round system, allowing the champion to skip next year's competition and only play the winner of that competition, was abolished. In 1925, the tournament was merged with the London Covered Court Championships. The women's doubles event was added to the tournament in 1934 and renamed to The National Covered Court Championships. From its inception, it grew into an important event through the first half of the 20th century, but by the late 1950s, its stature had diminished greatly and in 1966, they couldn't find a sponsor. In 1968, the BCCC became part of the first Dewar Cup circuit, but that was its final year at Queens Club.

In 1969, the tournament merged with the Wembley Championship while continuing to be called the British Covered Court Championships, and it became a Grand Prix event in 1970 and 1971. Several top players, who were part of the World Championship Tennis circuit, were barred from competition in 1972 and with no sponsors to be found, the tournament was discontinued.

Frenchman Jean Borotra is the male record holder with eleven singles titles and British Dorothea Douglass Chambers holds the record for women with seven singles titles.

== Champions ==
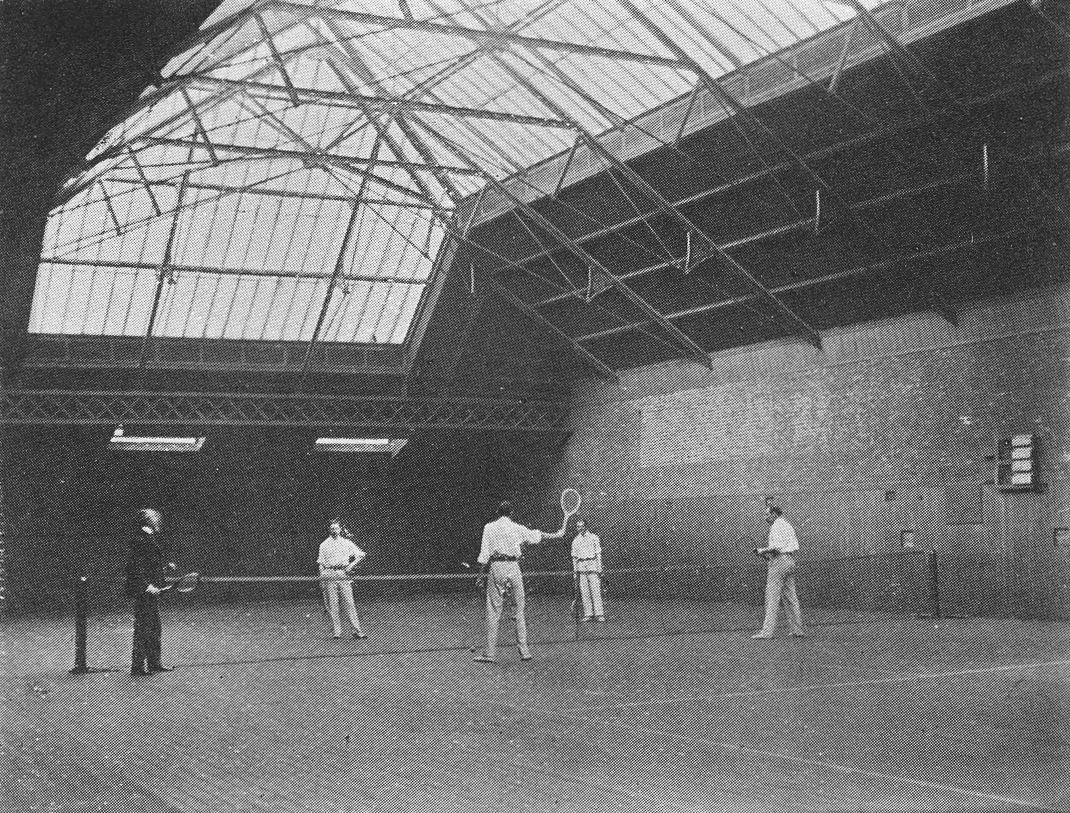
Indoor tennis court at Hyde Park in 1895

=== Men's singles ===
Year	Champions	Runners-up	Score	Surface
1885	(United Kingdom of Great Britain and Ireland) Herbert Lawford	(United Kingdom of Great Britain and Ireland) Charles Ross	7–5, 6–3, 6–0	Wood
1886	(United Kingdom of Great Britain and Ireland) Teddy Williams	(United Kingdom of Great Britain and Ireland) Herbert Lawford	6–2, 1–6, 5–7, 6–4, 6–4	Wood
1887	(United Kingdom of Great Britain and Ireland) Ernest Lewis	(United Kingdom of Great Britain and Ireland) Teddy Williams	6–2, 6–2, 6–1	Wood
1888	(United Kingdom of Great Britain and Ireland) Ernest Lewis	(United Kingdom of Great Britain and Ireland) Ernest George Meers	6–3, 6–0, 6–1	Wood
1889	(United Kingdom of Great Britain and Ireland) Ernest Lewis	(United Kingdom of Great Britain and Ireland) James Crispe	6–1, 6–1, 6–1	Wood
1890	(United Kingdom of Great Britain and Ireland) Ernest Lewis	(United Kingdom of Great Britain and Ireland) Ernest George Meers	6–2, 6–3, 6–2	Wood
1891	(United Kingdom of Great Britain and Ireland) Ernest Lewis	(United Kingdom of Great Britain and Ireland) Ernest George Meers	6–4, 8–6, 6–3	Wood
1892	(United Kingdom of Great Britain and Ireland) Ernest George Meers	(United Kingdom of Great Britain and Ireland) Ernest Lewis	6–3, 3–6, 6–1, 6–2	Wood
1893	(United Kingdom of Great Britain and Ireland) Harold Mahony	(United Kingdom of Great Britain and Ireland) Ernest George Meers	6–2, 6–2, 6–4	Wood
1894	(United Kingdom of Great Britain and Ireland) Harold Mahony	(United Kingdom of Great Britain and Ireland) Ernest George Meers	6–4, 6–4, 6–3	Wood
1895	(United Kingdom of Great Britain and Ireland) Ernest Lewis	(United Kingdom of Great Britain and Ireland) Harold Mahony	walkover	Wood
1896	(United Kingdom of Great Britain and Ireland) Ernest Lewis	(United Kingdom of Great Britain and Ireland) Wilberforce Eaves	6–4, 6–1, 6–8, 4–6, 7–5	Wood
1897	(United Kingdom of Great Britain and Ireland) Wilberforce Eaves	(United Kingdom of Great Britain and Ireland) Ernest Lewis	6–3, 6–3, 7–5	Wood
1898	(United Kingdom of Great Britain and Ireland) Wilberforce Eaves	(United Kingdom of Great Britain and Ireland) Laurence Doherty	6–4, 7–5, 6–3	Wood
1899	(United Kingdom of Great Britain and Ireland) Wilberforce Eaves	(United Kingdom of Great Britain and Ireland) Harold Mahony	6–2, 6–4, 6–8, 3–6, 6–4	Wood
1900	(United Kingdom of Great Britain and Ireland) Arthur Gore	(United Kingdom of Great Britain and Ireland) Major Ritchie	6–1, 7–5, 6–3	Wood
1901	(United Kingdom of Great Britain and Ireland) Laurence Doherty	(United Kingdom of Great Britain and Ireland) Arthur Gore	6–3, 6–1, 6–1	Wood
1902	(United Kingdom of Great Britain and Ireland) Laurence Doherty	(United Kingdom of Great Britain and Ireland) Major Ritchie	6–4, 6–3, 5–7, 6–3	Wood
1903	(United Kingdom of Great Britain and Ireland) Laurence Doherty	(United Kingdom of Great Britain and Ireland) George Hillyard	6–1, 4–6, 6–4, 6–2	Wood
1904	(United Kingdom of Great Britain and Ireland) Laurence Doherty	(United Kingdom of Great Britain and Ireland) Major Ritchie	6–2, 8–10, 5–7, 6–4, 6–3	Wood
1905	(United Kingdom of Great Britain and Ireland) Laurence Doherty	(United Kingdom of Great Britain and Ireland) Major Ritchie	6–1, 8–6, 6–2	Wood
1906	(United Kingdom of Great Britain and Ireland) Laurence Doherty	(United Kingdom of Great Britain and Ireland) Arthur Gore	6–2, 6–4, 8–6	Wood
1907	(New Zealand) Anthony Wilding	(United Kingdom of Great Britain and Ireland) Laurence Doherty	walkover	Wood
1908	(United Kingdom of Great Britain and Ireland) Arthur Gore	(New Zealand) Anthony Wilding	4–6, 8–6, 6–0, 8–6	Wood
1909	(United Kingdom of Great Britain and Ireland) Major Ritchie	(United Kingdom of Great Britain and Ireland) Arthur Gore	7–5, 8–6, 6–3	Wood
1910	(United Kingdom of Great Britain and Ireland) Gordon Lowe	(United Kingdom of Great Britain and Ireland) Arthur Lowe	6–4, 6–0, 6–1	Wood
1911	(France) André Gobert	(United Kingdom of Great Britain and Ireland) Gordon Lowe	6–3, 7–5, 6–3	Wood
1912	(France) André Gobert	(New Zealand) Anthony Wilding	3–6, 7–5, 4–6, 6–4, 6–4	Wood
1913	(United Kingdom of Great Britain and Ireland) Percival Davson	(Denmark) Erik Larsen	5–7, 6–2, 6–3, 6–2	Wood
1914	(United Kingdom of Great Britain and Ireland) Major Ritchie	(United Kingdom of Great Britain and Ireland) Percival Davson	8–6, 6–3, 6–1	Wood
1915–1918	Not held (due to World War I)			
1919	(United Kingdom of Great Britain and Ireland) Percival Davson	(United Kingdom of Great Britain and Ireland) Major Ritchie	6–2, 6–3, 8–6	Wood
1920	(France) André Gobert	(United Kingdom of Great Britain and Ireland) Percival Davson	6–4, 7–5, 6–2	Wood
1921	(France) André Gobert	(United Kingdom) Walter Crawley	6–2, 6–4, 4–6, 0–6, 7–5	Wood
1922	(France) André Gobert	(South Africa) Brian I. C. Norton	4–6, 6–1, 6–8, 6–4, 6–2	Wood
1923	(United Kingdom of Great Britain and Ireland) John D. Wheatley	(India) Hassan Ali Fyzee	1–6, 6–2, 6–4, 6–4	Wood
1924	(South Africa) Patrick Spence	(United Kingdom of Great Britain and Ireland) John D. Wheatley	6–2, 6–2, 4–6, 6–1	Wood
1925	(India) Sydney Jacob	(South Africa) Patrick Spence	3–6, 7–5, 6–0, 3–6, 6–3	Wood
1926	(France) Jean Borotra	(United Kingdom) Donald Greig	6–3, 6–2, 6–4	Wood
1927	(United Kingdom of Great Britain and Ireland) Edward Higgs	(United Kingdom) Gordon Crole Rees	6–4, 6–3, 6–4	Wood
1928	(France) Jean Borotra	(United Kingdom) Gordon Crole Rees	4–6, 6–1, 6–2, 6–3	Wood
1929	(France) Jean Borotra	(United Kingdom) Nigel Sharpe	7–5, 6–2, 6–2	Wood
1930	(France) Jean Borotra	(United Kingdom) Henry Austin	6–1, 0–6, 2–6, 6–2, 6–4	Wood
1931	(France) Jean Borotra	(Japan) Jiro Satoh	10–8, 6–3, 0–6, 6–3	Wood
1932	(France) Jean Borotra	(United Kingdom) Harry Lee	6–2, 6–3, 6–3	Wood
1933	(France) Jean Borotra	(United Kingdom) Henry Austin	6–3, 5–7, 6–4, 1–6, 6–4	Wood
1934	(United Kingdom) Henry Austin	(France) Jean Borotra	6–2, 4–6, 6–0, 6–8, 6–2	Wood
1935	(France) Jean Borotra	(United Kingdom) Nigel Sharpe	6–0, 6–2, 6–0	Wood
1936	(Sweden) Karl Schröder	(France) Jean Borotra	8–6, 6–1, 9–7	Wood
1937	(United Kingdom) Henry Austin	(Sweden) Karl Schröder	6–2, 3–6, 7–5, 6–2	Wood
1938	(France) Jean Borotra	(United Kingdom) Donald Butler	6–0, 4–6, 6–4, 6–2	Wood
1939–1946	Not held (due to World War II)			
1947	(Netherlands) Ivo Rinkel	(Poland) Ernest Wittman	3–6, 7–5, 7–5	Wood
1948	(France) Jean Borotra	(United Kingdom) Geoffrey Paish	6–3, 6–3, 6–2	Wood
1949	(France) Jean Borotra	(United Kingdom) Geoffrey Paish	6–4, 6–3, 6–3	Wood
1950	(Czechoslovakia) Jaroslav Drobný	(United Kingdom) Geoffrey Paish	6–3, 6–2, 6–0	Wood
1951	(United Kingdom) Geoffrey Paish	(Poland) Ignacy Tłoczyński	6–4, 6–4, 6–1	Wood
1952	(Czechoslovakia) Jaroslav Drobný	(United Kingdom) Tony Mottram	6–3, 6–4, 8–6	Wood
1953	(Czechoslovakia) Jaroslav Drobný	(United Kingdom) Robert Wilson	6–2, 7–5, 6–2	Wood
1954	(Czechoslovakia) Jaroslav Drobný	(Poland) Władysław Skonecki	7–5, 7–5, 7–9, 6–4	Wood
1955	(Poland) Władysław Skonecki	(United Kingdom) William Knight	5–7, 7–5, 6–4, 9–7	Wood
1956	(Austria) Alfred Huber	(United Kingdom) Geoffrey Paish	7–5, 7–5, 7–9, 6–4	Wood
1957	Not held			
1958	(United Kingdom) Mike Davies	(Australia) Owen Davidson	5–7, 6–1, 6–2, 6–2	Wood
1959	(United Kingdom) Robert Wilson	(Denmark) Kurt Nielsen	6–3, 8–6, 6–2	Wood
1960	(United Kingdom) William Knight	(United Kingdom) Robert Wilson	6–3, 6–4, 8–6	Wood
1961	(United Kingdom) Anthony Pickard	(Spain) Manuel Santana	6–1, 6–3, 6–3	Wood
1962	(United Kingdom) Robert Wilson	(United Kingdom) William Knight	3–6, 6–3, 8–6, 2–6, 6–2	Wood
1963	(United Kingdom) Robert Wilson	(United Kingdom) Roger Taylor	16–14, 6–2, 9–7	Wood
1964	(United Kingdom) Mike Sangster	(United Kingdom) Robert Wilson	6–3, 8–6, 6–4	Wood
1965	(United Kingdom) Robert Wilson	(United Kingdom) Mark Cox	6–3, 3–6, 6–3, 6–4	Wood
1966–1967	Not held			
Open era
1968	(South Africa) Bob Hewitt	(United States) Bob Lutz	4–6, 6–2, 6–4, 10–8	Wood
1969	(Australia) Rod Laver	(Australia) Tony Roche	6–4, 6–1, 6–3	Carpet
1970	(Australia) Rod Laver	(United States) Cliff Richey	6–3, 6–4, 7–5	Carpet
1971	(Romania) Ilie Năstase	(Australia) Rod Laver	3–6, 6–3, 3–6, 6–4, 6–4	Carpet

=== Women's singles ===
Year	Champions	Runners-up	Score	Surface
1890	(United Kingdom of Great Britain and Ireland) May Jacks	(United Kingdom of Great Britain and Ireland) Maud Shackle	6–0, 6–1	Wood
1891	(United Kingdom of Great Britain and Ireland) Maud Shackle	(United Kingdom of Great Britain and Ireland) May Jacks	7–5, 6–2	Wood
1892	(United Kingdom of Great Britain and Ireland) Maud Shackle	(United Kingdom of Great Britain and Ireland) May Arbuthnot	6–3, 3–6, 6–2	Wood
1893	(United Kingdom of Great Britain and Ireland) Maud Shackle	(United Kingdom of Great Britain and Ireland) May Arbuthnot	6–2, 1–6, 7–5	Wood
1894	(United Kingdom of Great Britain and Ireland) Edith Austin	(United Kingdom of Great Britain and Ireland) May Arbuthnot	2–6, 6–4, 7–5	Wood
1895	(United Kingdom of Great Britain and Ireland) Charlotte Cooper	(United Kingdom of Great Britain and Ireland) Edith Austin	6–4, 3–6, 6–1	Wood
1896	(United Kingdom of Great Britain and Ireland) Edith Austin	(United Kingdom of Great Britain and Ireland) Charlotte Cooper	6–2, 3–6, 6–3	Wood
1897	(United Kingdom of Great Britain and Ireland) Edith Austin	(United Kingdom of Great Britain and Ireland) Ruth Dyas	9–11, 6–4, 12–10	Wood
1898	(United Kingdom of Great Britain and Ireland) Edith Austin	(United Kingdom of Great Britain and Ireland) Ruth Pennington-Legh	6–3, 2–6, 6–2	Wood
1899	(United Kingdom of Great Britain and Ireland) Edith Austin	(United Kingdom of Great Britain and Ireland) Charlotte Cooper	6–2, 6–4	Wood
1900	(United Kingdom of Great Britain and Ireland) Toupie Lowther	(United Kingdom of Great Britain and Ireland) Edith Austin Greville	2–6, 7–5, 6–4	Wood
1901	(United Kingdom of Great Britain and Ireland) Blanche Bingley Hillyard	(United Kingdom of Great Britain and Ireland) Toupie Lowther	6–2, 6–3	Wood
1902	(United Kingdom of Great Britain and Ireland) Toupie Lowther	(United Kingdom of Great Britain and Ireland) Gladys Duddell	6–3, 6–1	Wood
1903	(United Kingdom of Great Britain and Ireland) Toupie Lowther	(France) Adine Masson	6–1, 6–0	Wood
1904	(United Kingdom of Great Britain and Ireland) Dorothea Douglass	(United Kingdom of Great Britain and Ireland) Edith Austin Greville	6–2, 6–3	Wood
1905	(United Kingdom of Great Britain and Ireland) Hilda Lane	(United Kingdom of Great Britain and Ireland) Gladys Eastlake Smith	6–4, 8–6	Wood
1906	(United Kingdom of Great Britain and Ireland) Dorothea Douglass	(United Kingdom of Great Britain and Ireland) Hilda Lane	6–2, 6–0	Wood
1907	(United Kingdom of Great Britain and Ireland) Gladys Eastlake Smith	(United Kingdom of Great Britain and Ireland) Mildred Coles	6–3, 6–3	Wood
1908	(United Kingdom of Great Britain and Ireland) Dorothea Douglass Chambers	(United Kingdom of Great Britain and Ireland) Gladys Eastlake Smith	6–3, 6–3	Wood
1909	(United Kingdom of Great Britain and Ireland) Dora Boothby	(United Kingdom of Great Britain and Ireland) Madeline O'Neill	6–1, 6–3	Wood
1910	(United Kingdom of Great Britain and Ireland) Dorothea Douglass Chambers	(United Kingdom of Great Britain and Ireland) Madeline O'Neill	6–4, 6–3	Wood
1911	(United Kingdom of Great Britain and Ireland) Dorothea Douglass Chambers	(United Kingdom of Great Britain and Ireland) Helen Aitchison	6–3, 6–1	Wood
1912	(United Kingdom of Great Britain and Ireland) Dorothy Holman	(United Kingdom of Great Britain and Ireland) Aurea Edgington	6–2, 6–0	Wood
1913	(United Kingdom of Great Britain and Ireland) Dorothea Douglass Chambers	(United Kingdom of Great Britain and Ireland) Dorothy Holman	6–2, 6–3	Wood
1914	(United Kingdom of Great Britain and Ireland) Dorothy Holman	(United Kingdom of Great Britain and Ireland) Madeline O'Neill	7–9, 6–1, 6–2	Wood
1915–1918	Not held			
1919	(United Kingdom of Great Britain and Ireland) Dorothea Douglass Chambers	(United Kingdom of Great Britain and Ireland) Dorothy Holman	6–3, 6–3	Wood
1920	(United States) Elizabeth Ryan	(United Kingdom of Great Britain and Ireland) Doris Craddock	6–4, 6–2	Wood
1921	(United Kingdom of Great Britain and Ireland) Dorothy Holman	(South Africa) Irene Bowder Peacock	6–1, 3–6, 6–4	Wood
1922	(United Kingdom of Great Britain and Ireland) Dorothy Holman	(United Kingdom of Great Britain and Ireland) Doris Craddock	6–2, 6–1	Wood
1923	(United Kingdom of Great Britain and Ireland) Mabel Davey Clayton	(United Kingdom of Great Britain and Ireland) Aurea Edgington	6–3, 6–2	Wood
1924	(United Kingdom) Geraldine Beamish	(United Kingdom of Great Britain and Ireland) Doris Craddock	6–4, 6–4	Wood
1925	(United Kingdom of Great Britain and Ireland) Joan Reid-Thomas	(United Kingdom of Great Britain and Ireland) Blanche Colston	6–2, 7–5	Wood
1926	(United Kingdom of Great Britain and Ireland) Peggy Saunders	(United Kingdom of Great Britain and Ireland) Betty Dix	6–4, 6–2	Wood
1927	(United Kingdom) Eileen Bennett	(United Kingdom) Cristobel Hardie	6–4, 6–0	Wood
1928	(United Kingdom) Kathleen McKane Godfree	(United Kingdom) Eileen Bennett	6–1, 6–2	Wood
1929	(United Kingdom) Peggy Saunders Michell	(United Kingdom) Joan Ridley	6–4, 6–4	Wood
1930	(United Kingdom) Joan Ridley	(United Kingdom) Joan Fry	6–2, 6–2	Wood
1931	(United Kingdom) Mary Heeley	(United Kingdom) Jeanette Morfey	6–1, 6–0	Wood
1932	(United Kingdom) Peggy Scriven	(United Kingdom) Kay Stammers	6–2, 6–4	Wood
1933	(United Kingdom) Phyllis King	(United Kingdom) Kay Stammers	10–12, 6–1, 6–3	Wood
1934	(United Kingdom) Phyllis King	(United Kingdom) Mary Hardwick	6–3, 4–6, 6–2	Wood
1935	(United Kingdom) Peggy Scriven	(United Kingdom) Ermyntrude Harvey	6–2, 6–2	Wood
1936	(Chile) Anita Lizana	(United Kingdom) Mary Hardwick	6–3, 6–0	Wood
1937	(United Kingdom) Peggy Scriven	(United Kingdom) Phyllis King	6–1, 6–2	Wood
1938	(United Kingdom) Peggy Scriven	(United Kingdom) Alexandra McOstrich McKelvie	6–3, 4–6, 6–1	Wood
1939–1947	Not held			
1948	(United Kingdom) Gem Hoahing	(United Kingdom) Joan Curry	1–6, 6–3, 7–5	Wood
1949	(United Kingdom) Joan Curry	(United Kingdom) Jean Quertier	6–1, 6–0	Wood
1950	(United Kingdom) Jean Quertier	(United Kingdom) Joan Curry	3–6, 7–5, 6–3	Wood
1951	(United Kingdom) Susan Partridge	(United Kingdom) Jean Walker-Smith	6–4, 6–4	Wood
1952	(United Kingdom) Angela Mortimer	(United Kingdom) Susan Partridge	6–3, 3–6, 6–3	Wood
1953	(United Kingdom) Angela Mortimer	(United Kingdom) Georgie Woodgate	6–3, 6–2	Wood
1954	(United Kingdom) Angela Mortimer	(United Kingdom) Shirley Bloomer	6–2, 6–3	Wood
1955	(United Kingdom) Anne Shilcock	(United Kingdom) Pat Ward	6–2, 6–4	Wood
1956	(United Kingdom) Angela Buxton	(United Kingdom) Anne Shilcock	6–2, 6–2	Wood
1957	Not held			
1958	(United Kingdom) Anne Shilcock	(United Kingdom) Christine Truman	6–2, 6–2	Wood
1959	(United Kingdom) Angela Mortimer	(United Kingdom) Pat Ward	6–2, 6–3	Wood
1960	(United Kingdom) Angela Mortimer	(United Kingdom) Ann Haydon	7–5, retired	Wood
1961	(United Kingdom) Angela Mortimer	(United Kingdom) Christine Truman	2–6, 6–1, 6–4	Wood
1962	(United Kingdom) Ann Haydon	(United Kingdom) Christine Truman	6–4, 4–6, 9–7	Wood
1963	(United Kingdom) Deidre Catt	(South Africa) Renée Schuurman	4–6, 6–3, 6–3	Wood
1964	(United Kingdom) Ann Haydon-Jones	(United Kingdom) Fay Toyne	6–3, 6–3	Wood
1965	(United Kingdom) Ann Haydon-Jones	(United Kingdom) Fay Toyne	6–2, 6–1	Wood
1966–1967	Not held			
Open era
1968	(Australia) Margaret Court	(United Kingdom) Virginia Wade	10–8, 6–1	Wood
1969	(United Kingdom) Ann Haydon-Jones	(United States) Billie Jean King	9–11, 6–2, 9–7	Carpet
1970	(United States) Billie Jean King	(United Kingdom) Ann Haydon-Jones	8–6, 3–6, 6–1	Carpet
1971	(United States) Billie Jean King	(France) Françoise Dürr	6–1, 5–7, 7–5	Carpet

== Records ==
=== Men's singles ===
- Most titles: (France) Jean Borotra, 11
- Most consecutive titles: (France) Jean Borotra, 6
- Most finals: (France) Jean Borotra, 13
- Most consecutive finals: (France) Jean Borotra, 9
- Most matches played: (United Kingdom) Major Ritchie, 83
- Most matches won: (France) Jean Borotra, (67)
- Most consecutive match wins: (France) Jean Borotra, 35
- Most editions played: (United Kingdom) Major Ritchie, 30
- Best match winning %: (France) André Gobert 94.12%
- Longest final: (United Kingdom) Laurence Doherty v (United Kingdom) Major Ritchie, result: 6–2, 8–10, 5–7, 6–4, 6–3, 57 games, 1904
- Shortest final: (France) Jean Borotra v (United Kingdom) Nigel Sharpe, result: 6–0, 6–2, 6–0, 20 games, 1935
- Title won with the fewest games lost, (United Kingdom) Ernest Wool Lewis, 22, 1887
- Oldest champion: (France) Jean Borotra, 51y 1m and 28d, 1949
- Youngest champion: (United Kingdom) Edward Lake Williams, 19y 9m and 12d, 1886

== See also ==
- British Hard Court Championships
- Category:National and multi-national tennis tournaments
