= Mid-Kent Open Championships =

Defunct tennis tournament
- Founded: 1881; 144 years ago
- Abolished: 1927; 98 years ago
- Location: Maidstone, Kent, England
- Venue: Maidstone Athletic Ground
- Surface: Grass

The Mid-Kent Open Championships was a men's and women's grass court tennis tournament founded in 1881, as a men only event called the Maidstone Lawn Tennis Tournament. The first staging of this event was at the Maidstone Athletic Ground, Sandling Place, Maidstone, Kent, England before it was discontinued after only one season. In 1894 a new Maidstone Open lawn tennis tournament was revived that featured the Mid-Kent Championships, this event ran until 1927.

== History ==
In 1881, a Maidstone Lawn Tennis Tournament was first staged at the Maidstone, Athletic Ground, Maidstone, Kent, England. The first winner of the men's singles was Britain's Richard Mercer. In 1894, a Maidstone Open tournament was revived, that featured the Mid-Kent Championships that was sanctioned by the Lawn Tennis Association. The championship and ran until 1927.

== Finals ==
=== Men's singles ===
(incomplete roll) included:

Year	Winner	Runner-up	Score
Maidstone Tournament
1881	(United Kingdom) Richard Mercer	(England) Mr. Stited	w.o.
1883	(United Kingdom) Randall Mercer (2)	(United Kingdom) Harold Sweetenham	6–3, 6–5, 6–4
Mid-Kent Championships
1897	(England) Hugh Marley	(United Kingdom) Charles Gladstone Allen	6-4, 6–2, 2–6, 1–6, 6-3
1900	(United Kingdom) Roy Allen	(United Kingdom) Reginald Arthur Gamble	6-4, 6–2, 6-1
1904	(United Kingdom) Roy Allen (2)	(United Kingdom) George Lawrence Orme	6-2 6-4
1905	(New Zealand) Harry Alabaster Parker	(United Kingdom) Charles Gladstone Allen	w.o.
1906	(United Kingdom) Edward Lyell Bristow	(United Kingdom) Ernest Taylor Annett	6-4, 6–0, 7-5
1907	(United Kingdom) Alfred Ernest Beamish	(United Kingdom) Roy Allen	6-3, 4–6, 8-6
1908	(Germany) Otto Froitzheim	(Canada) Robert Powell	4-6, 6–1, 6-4
1909	(United Kingdom) Alfred Ernest Beamish (2)	(United Kingdom) Ernest Taylor Annett	6-2, 6-2
1910	(United Kingdom) Alfred Ernest Beamish (3)	(United Kingdom) Allan Campbell Pearson	6-1, 6-1
1915/1918	Not held (due to world war one)		
Mid-Kent Open Championships
1919	(United Kingdom) John Cecil Masterman	(United Kingdom) G.N. Thompson	2-6, 6-0, 7-5
1920	(United Kingdom) Lawrence Francis Davin	(United Kingdom) John Cecil Masterman	6-3, 1-6, 6-2, 1-6, 6-4
1925.	(United Kingdom) Wilfrid Hay MacDowall Aitken	?	?
1926.	(United Kingdom) Wilfrid Hay MacDowall Aitken (2)	(United Kingdom) Guy Oscar Jameson	6-4, 6-1, 6-1.

=== Women's Singles ===
Incomplete Roll

Year	Winner	Runner-up	Score
Mid-Kent Championships
1895	(United Kingdom) Nora Hreen	(England) Mrs Blackett	7-5, 5-3 retired
1897	(England) M. Stonham	(England) Miss Rennick	6-1, 6-2
1898	(England) Hilda Lane	(England) M. Stonham	3-6, 7-5, 6-2
1899	(England) Hilda Lane (2)	(England) Alice Greene	6-4, 7-5
1900	(England) Hilda Lane (3)	(England) Connie Wilson	9-7, 6-3
1901	(England) Connie Wilson	(England) Alice Greene	6-4, 6-3
1902	(United Kingdom) Edith Jane Bromfield	(United Kingdom) Mildred Coles	4-6, 6-4, 6-3
1903	(United Kingdom) Mildred Coles	(United Kingdom) Miss Tootell	7-5, 6-3
1904	(United Kingdom) Mildred Coles (2)	(United Kingdom) Mabel Bramwell Squire	4-6, 4-0 retired.
1905	(United Kingdom) Miss Tootell	(United Kingdom) Mildred Coles	1-6, 6-1, 6-4
1906	(United Kingdom) Ruth Pennington-Legh Winch	(England) Hilda Lane	6-3, 6-0
1907	(United Kingdom) Agnes Morton	(United States) Helen Harper	6-0, 6-0
1908	(United Kingdom) Agnes Morton (2)	(England) E.L. Bosworth	6-1, 6-1
1909	(United Kingdom) Rosamund Salusbury	(United Kingdom) Geraldine Ramsey	6-4, 6-3
1910	(United Kingdom) Rosamund Salusbury (2)	(United States) Helen Harper	2-6, 6-0, 6-0
1911	(United Kingdom) Mildred Coles (3)	(Australia) Orea Moustaka Beatty	5-7, 6-1, 6-3
1912	(United Kingdom) Vera Spofforth	(United Kingdom) Mrs A.A. Hall	7-5. 6-4
1913	(United Kingdom) Phyllis Carr Satterthwaite	(United Kingdom) Norah Lattey	6-0, 6-0
1914	(United Kingdom) Mildred Coles (4)	(Australia) Orea Moustaka Beatty	w.o.
1915/1918	Not held (due to world war one)		
Mid-Kent Open Championships
1919	(United Kingdom) Madeline Fisher O'Neill	(United Kingdom) Lavinia Radeglia	6-8, 7–5, 6-4
1920	(United Kingdom) Lucy Scott Harker	(United Kingdom) M. Towler	7-5, 8-6
1921	(United Kingdom) Miss Belchamber	(United Kingdom) M. Scott	?
1922	(United Kingdom) L. Toller	(United Kingdom) M. Scott	6-3, 8-6
1923	(United Kingdom) Winifred MacClellan	(United Kingdom) D. Keays	def
1924	(United Kingdom) Phoebe Holcroft	(United Kingdom) Mrs Wilkin	6-3, 6-1
1926	(United Kingdom) Ruth Foulger Landale	(United Kingdom) Madie Pearson	6-1, 6-2
1927	(United Kingdom) Cecily Hartley Marriott	(United Kingdom) Mrs E.M. MacLeod	6-4, 6-3
