= Dorothea Lambert Chambers =

British tennis and badminton player (1878–1960)

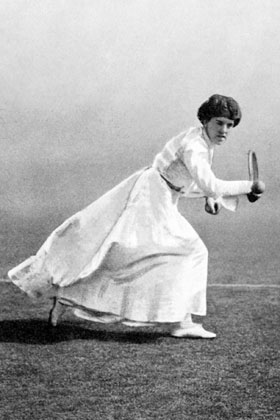
- Full name: Dorothea Katherine Douglass Lambert Chambers
- Country (sports): United Kingdom
- Born: 3 September 1878 Ealing, Middlesex, England
- Died: 7 January 1960 (aged 81) Kensington, London, England
- Int. Tennis HoF: 1981 (member page)

Grand Slam singles results
- Wimbledon: W (1903, 1904, 1906, 1910, 1911, 1913, 1914)
- US Open: QF (1925)

Grand Slam doubles results
- Wimbledon: F (1913, 1919, 1920)

Grand Slam mixed doubles results
- Wimbledon: F (1919)

Team competitions
- Wightman Cup: W (1925)
Medal record
Olympic Games – Tennis
Gold medal – first place	1908 London	Singles

Dorothea Lambert Chambers (née Dorothea Katherine Douglass; 3 September 1878 – 7 January 1960) was a British tennis player. She won seven Wimbledon women's singles titles and a gold medal at the 1908 Summer Olympics.

== Tennis ==
In 1900, Douglass made her singles debut at Wimbledon, and after a bye in the first round, she lost her second-round match to Louisa Martin. She won her first of seven ladies' singles titles three years later. On 6 April 1907, she married Robert Lambert Chambers and became known by her married surname Lambert Chambers.

In 1908, she won the gold medal in the women's singles event at the 1908 Summer Olympics after a straight-sets victory in the final against compatriot Dora Boothby.

She wrote Tennis for Ladies, published in 1910. The book contained photographs of tennis techniques and advice on attire and equipment.

In 1911, Lambert Chambers won the women's final at Wimbledon against Dora Boothby 6–0, 6–0, the first player to win a Grand Slam singles final without losing a game. To date, this feat was repeated only two more times in over 115 years of grand slam history, by Steffi Graf when she defeated Natalia Zvereva in the 1988 French Open final and then by Iga Swiatek in the 2025 Wimbledon women's singles final when she beat Amanda Anisimova 6–0, 6–0 in 57 minutes.

In 1919, Lambert Chambers played the longest Wimbledon final up to that time: 44 games against Frenchwoman Suzanne Lenglen. Lambert Chambers held two match points at 6–5 in the third set but eventually lost to Lenglen 8–10, 6–4, 7–9.

Lambert Chambers only played sporadic singles after 1921 but continued to compete in doubles until 1927. She made the singles quarterfinals of the U.S. Championships in 1925, and from 1924 to 1926, she captained Britain's Wightman Cup team. In the 1925 Wightman Cup, she played, at the age of 46, a singles (against Eleanor Goss) and doubles match and won both. In 1928 she turned to professional coaching.

Lambert Chambers was posthumously inducted into the International Tennis Hall of Fame in 1981. She died in Kensington, London in 1960, aged 81.

== Grand Slam finals ==
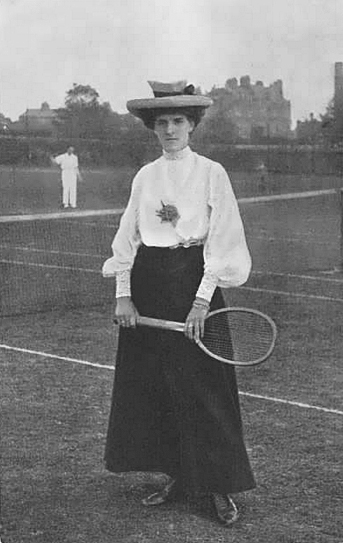
Dorothea Lambert Chambers in 1906

=== Singles: 11 (7 titles, 4 runner-ups) ===
Result	Year	Championship	Surface	Opponents	Score
Win *	1903	Wimbledon	Grass	(United Kingdom of Great Britain and Ireland) Ethel Thomson	4–6, 6–4, 6–2
Win	1904	Wimbledon (2)	Grass	(United Kingdom of Great Britain and Ireland) Charlotte Cooper Sterry	6–0, 6–3
Loss	1905	Wimbledon	Grass	(United States) May Sutton	3–6, 4–6
Win	1906	Wimbledon (3)	Grass	(United States) May Sutton	6–3, 9–7
Loss	1907	Wimbledon	Grass	(United States) May Sutton	1–6, 4–6
Win	1910	Wimbledon (4)	Grass	(United Kingdom of Great Britain and Ireland) Dora Boothby	6–2, 6–2
Win	1911	Wimbledon (5)	Grass	(United Kingdom of Great Britain and Ireland) Dora Boothby	6–0, 6–0
Win **	1913	Wimbledon (6)	Grass	(United Kingdom of Great Britain and Ireland) Winifred McNair	6–0, 6–4
Win	1914	Wimbledon (7)	Grass	(United Kingdom of Great Britain and Ireland) Ethel Thomson Larcombe	7–5, 6–4
Loss	1919	Wimbledon	Grass	(France) Suzanne Lenglen	8–10, 6–4, 7–9
Loss	1920	Wimbledon	Grass	(France) Suzanne Lenglen	3–6, 0–6

^{*} This was the all-comers final as Muriel Robb did not defend her 1902 Wimbledon title, which resulted in the winner of the all-comers final winning the challenge round, and thus, Wimbledon in 1903 by walkover.
^{**} This was the all-comers final as Ethel Thomson Larcombe did not defend her 1912 Wimbledon title, which resulted in the winner of the all-comers final winning the challenge round and, thus, Wimbledon in 1913 by walkover.

=== Doubles: 3 runner-ups ===
Result	Year	Championship	Surface	Partner	Opponents	Score
Loss	1913	Wimbledon	Grass	(United Kingdom) Charlotte Cooper Sterry	(United Kingdom) Dora Boothby (United Kingdom) Winifred McNair	6–4, 4–2, ret.
Loss	1919	Wimbledon	Grass	(United Kingdom) Ethel Thomson Larcombe	(France) Suzanne Lenglen (United States) Elizabeth Ryan	6–4, 5–7, 3–6
Loss	1920	Wimbledon	Grass	(United Kingdom) Ethel Thomson Larcombe	(France) Suzanne Lenglen (United States) Elizabeth Ryan	4–6, 0–6

=== Mixed doubles: 1 runner-up ===
Result	Year	Championship	Surface	Partner	Opponents	Score
Loss	1919	Wimbledon	Grass	(United Kingdom) Albert Prebble	(United States) Elizabeth Ryan (United Kingdom) Randolph Lycett	0–6, 0–6

== Career finals ==
=== Singles titles (64) ===
Notes: Incomplete list she reportedly won 81 singles titles.

	Year	Tournament	Location	Surface	Opponent	Score
1	1901	North London Championships (Gipsy)	Stamford Hill	Grass	(United Kingdom) Ellen Thynne Evered	6-4, 9–7
2	1901	Essex Championships	Colchester	Grass	(United Kingdom) Agnes Morton	6-3, 6–3
3	1901	North of England Championships	Scarborough	Grass	(United Kingdom) Alice Simpson Pickering	4-6, 10–8, 6–1
4	1902	North London Championships (2)	Stamford Hill	Grass	(United Kingdom) Agnes Morton	4-6, 6–2, 8–6
5	1903	Derbyshire Championships	Buxton	Grass	(United Kingdom) Ethel Thomson	6-2, 6–1
6	1903	Wimbledon Championships	London	Grass	(United Kingdom) Muriel Robb	w.o.
7	1903	North London Championships (3)	Stamford Hill	Grass	(United Kingdom) Agnes Morton	6-3, 6–2
8	1904	Wimbledon Championships (2)	London	Grass	(United Kingdom) Charlotte Sterry	6–0, 6–3
9	1904	British Covered Court Championships	London	Wood (i)	(United Kingdom) Edith Austin	7–5, 6–4, 7–9, 6–2
10	1904	Derbyshire Championships (2)	Buxton	Grass	(United Kingdom) Ethel Thomson	6-2, 4–6, 6–3
11	1904	Sussex Championships	Brighton	Grass	(United Kingdom) Charlotte Sterry	6–3, 6–3
12	1904	South of England Championships	Eastbourne	Grass	(United Kingdom) Charlotte Sterry	6–3, 4–6, 6–3, 6–1
13	1905	The Homburg Cup	Bad Homburg	Clay	(United Kingdom) Toupie Lowther	6-3, 7–5
14	1905	London Covered Court Championships	London	Wood (i)	(United Kingdom) Ethel Thomson Larcombe	6–4, 6–2
15	1906	Wimbledon Championships (3)	London	Grass	(United States) May Sutton	6–3, 9–7
16	1906	Northern Championships	Liverpool	Grass	(United States) May Sutton	7–5, 6–2
17	1906	Kent Championships	Beckenham	Grass	(United Kingdom) Connie Wilson	6–3, 2-2
18	1906	East of England Championships	Felixstowe	Grass	(United Kingdom) Connie Wilson	14-14
19	1906	British Covered Court Championships (2)	London	Wood (i)	(United Kingdom) Hilda Lane	6–2, 6–0
20	1906	Berkshire Championships	Reading	Grass	(United Kingdom) Violet Pinckney	6-0, 6–1
21	1906	Middlesex Championships	Chiswick	Grass	(United Kingdom) Charlotte Sterry	6-1 6–0
22	1906	Baden Baden International	Baden-Baden	Clay	(United Kingdom) Toupie Lowther	6–4, 6–4
23	1906	The Homburg Cup (2)	Bad Homburg	Clay	(United Kingdom) Blanche Bingley Hillyard	6-4, 8–6
24	1906	South of England Championships (2)	Eastbourne	Grass	(United Kingdom) Agnes Morton	3–6, 6–3, 6–2
25	1907	Middlesex Championships (2)	Chiswick	Grass	(United Kingdom) Miss M.E. Brown	divided title
26	1907	Nice Championship	Nice	Clay	(United Kingdom) Toupie Lowther	6–4, 6–4
27	1907	Northumberland Championships	Newcastle-upon-Tyne	Grass	(United Kingdom) Charlotte Sterry	6-2, 6–3
28	1907	South of England Championships (3)	Eastbourne	Grass	(United Kingdom) Charlotte Sterry	4–6, 6–3, 7–5
29	1907	Berkshire Championships (2)	Reading	Grass	(United Kingdom) Violet Pinckney	6-1, 6–1
30	1908	British Covered Court Championships (3)	London	Wood (i)	(United Kingdom) Gwendoline Eastlake-Smith	6-3, 6–3
31	1908	Middlesex Championships (3)	Chiswick	Grass	(United Kingdom) Angela Greene	7-5, 6–4
32	1908	Olympic Games London ( outdoor singles)	London	Grass	(United Kingdom) Dora Boothby	6–1, 7–5
33	1908	Cannes Championships	Cannes	Clay	(United Kingdom) Melita Dillon	6-1, 6–4
34	1908	Berkshire Championships (3)	Reading	Grass	(United Kingdom) Violet Pinckney	6-1, 6–1
35	1908	Northumberland Championships (2)	Newcastle	Grass	(United Kingdom) Charlotte Sterry	6-1, 7–5
36	1910	Wimbledon Championships (4)	London	Grass	(United Kingdom) Dora Boothby	6-2, 6–2
37	1910	Kent Championships (2)	Beckenham	Grass	(United Kingdom) Dora Boothby	6-4, 6–3
38	1910	South of England Championships (4)	Eastbourne	Grass	(United Kingdom) Ethel Thomson Larcombe	7-5, 7–5
39	1910	British Covered Court Championships (4)	London	Wood (i)	(United Kingdom) Madeline O'Neill	6–4, 6–3
40	1910	Middlesex Championships (4)	Chiswick	Grass	(United Kingdom) Miss M. Messom	6-2, 6–2
41	1910	Berkshire Championships (4)	Reading	Grass	(United Kingdom) Violet Pinckney	6-1, 6–1
42	1910	Nottinghamshire Championships	Nottingham	Grass	(United Kingdom) Gwendoline Eastlake-Smith	6-3, 6–3
43	1910	East of England Championships (2)	Felixstowe	Grass	(United Kingdom) Miss M. Messom	6-0, 6–2
44	1911	Wimbledon Championships (5)	London	Grass	(United Kingdom) Dora Boothby	6-0, 6–0
45	1911	British Covered Court Championships (5)	London	Wood (i)	(United Kingdom) Helen Aitchison	6–3, 6–1
46	1911	Middlesex Championships (5)	Chiswick	Grass	(United Kingdom) Mabel Parton	6–3, 6–2
47	1911	Nottinghamshire Championships (2)	Nottingham	Grass	(United Kingdom) Edith Hannam	3-6, 8–6, 6–2
48	1911	Northern Championships (2)	Manchester	Grass	(United Kingdom) Mabel Parton	6–2, 6–2
49	1911	Kent Championships (3)	Beckenham	Grass	(United Kingdom) Mildred Coles	6-3, 7–5
50	1913	Wimbledon Championships (6)	London	Grass	(United Kingdom) Ethel Thomson Larcombe	w.o.
51	1913	British Covered Court Championships (6)	London	Wood (i)	(United Kingdom) Dorothy Holman	6–2, 6–3
52	1913	Middlesex Championships (6)	Chiswick	Grass	(United Kingdom) Dora Boothby	6-2, 6–3
53	1913	Kent Championships (4)	Beckenham	Grass	(United Kingdom) Phyllis Satterthwaite	6-4, 6–2
54	1914	Wimbledon Championships (7)	London	Grass	(United Kingdom) Ethel Thomson Larcombe	7-5, 6–4
55	1914	Monte Carlo Championships	Monte Carlo	Clay	(United States) Elizabeth Ryan	6-4, 6–1
56	1914	French Riviera Championships	Menton	Clay	(United States) Elizabeth Ryan	6–2, 6–1
57	1914	South of France Championships	Nice	Clay	(United Kingdom) Maud Stuart	6–2, 6–0
58	1914	Nice Country Club Tournament	Nice	Clay	(United Kingdom) Jessie Tripp	6-2, 6–0
59	1914	Surrey Grass Court Championships	Surbiton	Grass	(United Kingdom) Ethel Thomson Larcombe	6-3, 2–6, 6–4
60	1914	Middlesex Championships (7)	Chiswick	Grass	(United Kingdom) Aurea Edgington	w.o.
61	1914	Northern Championships (3)	Liverpool	Grass	(United Kingdom) Agnes Morton	6-1, 6–2
62	1919	British Covered Court Championships (7)	London	Wood (i)	(United Kingdom) Dorothy Holman	6-3, 6–3
63	1919	Northern Championships (4)	Manchester	Grass	(United Kingdom) Ethel Thomson Larcombe	6-1, 6–2
64	1920	Surrey Grass Court Championships (2)	Surbiton	Grass	(United States) Elizabeth Ryan	6-4, 6–2

== Badminton ==
In addition to playing tennis, Lambert Chambers was one of the leading badminton players at the beginning of the 20th century. In 1903, 1904 and 1907, she was the runner-up at the singles event of the All England Badminton Championships.

== Personal life ==
She undertook war work during the First World War, first at Ealing Hospital and later at the Little Theatre. She married Robert Lambert Chambers, nephew of John Graham Chambers.
