= 1904 All England Badminton Championships =

Tournament details
- Dates: 16 March 1904– 19 March 1904
- Edition: 6th
- Venue: London Rifle Brigade Drill Hall
- Location: 130 Bunhill Row, Islington, London
- Official website: All England Championships

The 1904 All England Championships was a badminton tournament held at the London Rifle Brigade Drill Hall in Islington, London, England from 16 to 19 March 1904.

Henry Norman Marrett made a clean sweep of victories by winning the men's singles, men's doubles and mixed doubles. Ethel Thomson retained her women's singles title and teamed up again with Meriel Lucas to win the women's doubles. Lucas had missed the 1903 competition.

The venue made six courts available and the event was extended to four days in order to include an England v Ireland international match.

== Final results ==
Category	Winners	Runners-up	Score
Men's singles	(England) Henry Marrett	(England) Sir George Thomas	15-8, 15-10
Women's singles	(England) Ethel Thomson	(England) Dorothea Douglass	15-2, 15-8
Men's doubles	(England) Albert Prebble & Henry Marrett	(Republic of Ireland) S. H. Dillon & John Stokes	15-8, 15-7
Women's doubles	(England) Ethel Thomson & Meriel Lucas	(England) Hazel Hogarth & M. Drake	15-2, 15-5
Mixed doubles	(England) Henry Marrett & Dorothea Douglass	(England) Albert Prebble & Meriel Lucas	15-6, 15-12
Men's doubles handicap	(England) E. A. Short & R. Franck (+7)	(England) Percy Buckley & Herbert Mellersh (-12)	15-1, 15-3
Women's doubles handicap	(England) Muriel Bateman & Margaret Larminie (-14)	(England) Hazel Hogarth & M. Drake (-8)	15-2, 10–15, 15-12
Mixed doubles handicap	(England) Leonard Ransford & Mabel Hardy (-20)	(England) Henry Marrett & Dorothea Douglass (-15)	w/o

== Men's singles ==
First round
(England) Henry Marrett
bye
(England) Albert Cowley
bye
(England) H. S. Venables
bye
(England) H. R. Mayo
bye
(England) Ralph Watling	15	15
(Republic of Ireland) Arthur Cave	9	5
(Republic of Ireland) John Stokes	11	15	15
(England) H. C. Fanshawe	15	4	5
(England) C. J. Wiltshire	w/o
(England) C. Rivett-Carmac	scr
(England) S. R. Arthur
bye
(England) George Thomas	15	15
(England) Norman Wood	5	10
(England) E. Young	15	15
(Republic of Ireland) H. O. Wood	10	3
(England) Frank Abbatt	15	15	15
(England) Edward Hawthorn	18	11	3
(England) T. H. E. Bird
bye
(Republic of Ireland) S. H. Dillon
bye
(England) W. Redshaw
bye
(England) E. P. Harrison
bye
(England) J.H. Colin Prior
bye

Second round
(England) Marrett	15	15
(England) Cowley	2	2
(England) Venables	12	15	15
(England) Mayo	15	6	6
(England) Watling	15	15
(Republic of Ireland) Stokes	6	8
(England) Wiltshire	15	17
(England) Arthur	2	16
(England) Thomas	15	15
(England) Young	0	11
(England) Abbatt	17	18
(England) Bird	15	16
(Republic of Ireland) Dillon	15	15
(England) Redshaw	4	5
(England) Harrison	15	6	15
(England) Prior	12	15	6

Quarter-finals
(England) Marrett	w/o
(England) Venables	scr
(England) Watling	w/o
(England) Wiltshire	scr
(England) Thomas	15	15
(England) Abbatt	5	6
(Republic of Ireland) Dillon	15	15
(England) Harrison	4	8

Semi-finals
(England) Marrett	15	15
(England) Watling	8	10
(England) Thomas	15	15
(Republic of Ireland) Dillon	6	11

Final
(England) Marrett	15	15
(England) Thomas	8	10

== Women's singles ==
First round
(England) Ethel Thomson	15	15
(England) Miss E. C. Pemberton	0	0
(England) Miss Ellen Stawell-Brown
bye
(England) Mrs C. Gray
bye
(England) Miss E. B. M. Tatham
bye
(England) Dorothea Douglass	15	15
(England) Meriel Lucas	2	12
(England) Miss C. M. Wilson
bye
(England) Mabel Hardy
bye
(England) Mrs E. Brownrigg
bye

Quarter-finals
(England) Thomson	15	15
(England) Brown	2	8
(England) Gray	15	15
(England) Tatham	5	8
(England) Douglass	17	15
(England) Wilson	2	12
(England) Hardy	15	15
(England) Brownrigg	1	4

Semi-finals
(England) Thomson	15	18
(England) Gray	0	1
(England) Douglass	16	15	15
(England) Hardy	17	5	3

Final
(England) Thomson	15	15
(England) Douglas	2	8

== Men's doubles ==
First round
(England) Albert Prebble & Henry Marrett
bye
(England) Herbert Mellersh & J. H. Colin Prior
bye
(England) Percy Buckley & E. Young	15	15
(England) Col. Ian Campbell & S. R. Arthur	8	8
(England) C. C. Robinson & T. H. E. Bird
bye
(England) Leonard Ransford & Robert Ransford
bye
(England) W. Wheelwright & A. B. Clifton
bye
(England) Frank Abbatt & D. H. MacDougall
bye
(England) E. Browne & Norman Wood
bye
(Republic of Ireland) S. H. Dillon & John Stokes
bye
(England) C. Rivett-Carmac & Shield
bye
(England) C. T. J. Barnes & Edward St.John
bye
(England) George Vidal & Piers
bye
(England) George Thomas & C. J. Wiltshire
bye
(England) Stewart Massey & E. P. Harrison
bye
(Republic of Ireland) H. O. Wood & Arthur Cave
bye
(England) Albert Cowley & J. C. Llewellyn
bye

Second round
(England) Prebble & Marrett	15	15
(England) Mellersh & Prior	10	4
(England) Buckley & Young	15	15
(England) Robinson & Bird	9	6
(England) Ransford & Ransford	15	15
(England) Wheelwright & Clifton	7	11
(England) Abbatt & MacDougall	15	15
(England) Browne & Wood	12	8
(Republic of Ireland) Dillon & Stokes	15	15
(England) Rivett-Carmac & Shield	3	8
(England) Barnes & St.John	w/o
(England) Vidal & Piers	ret
(England) Thomas & Wiltshire	15	15
(England) Massey & Harrison	10	6
(Republic of Ireland) Wood & Cave	15	12	15
(England) Cowley & Llewellyn	11	15	10

Quarter-finals
(England) Prebble & Marrett	15	15
(England) Buckley & Young	11	8
(England) Ransford & Ransford	18	15
(England) Abbatt & MacDougall	14	4
(Republic of Ireland) Dillon & Stokes	15	15
(England) Barnes & St.John	11	7
(England) Thomas & Wiltshire	15	15
(Republic of Ireland) Wood & Cave	4	7

Semi-finals
(England) Prebble & Marrett	15	5	15
(England) Ransford & Ransford	5	15	2
(Republic of Ireland) Dillon & Stokes	15	15
(England) Thomas & Wiltshire	5	7

Final
(England) Prebble & Marrett	15	15
(Republic of Ireland) Dillon & Stokes	8	7

== Women's doubles ==
First round
(England) Ethel Thomson & Meriel Lucas
(England) Dorothea Douglass & Mabel Hardy
(England) Mrs Ruth Watling & Muriel Bateman	15	15
(England) Mrs C. Gray & Mrs E. Brownrigg	7	7
(England) Hazel Hogarth & Miss M. Drake	13	15	15
(England) Miss C. M. Wilson & Miss H. Lane	15	8	11
(England) Mrs Binyon & Ellen Stawell-Brown	15	15
(England) Miss E. C. Pemberton & Miss E. B. M. Tatham	0	3

Semi-finals
(England) Lucas & Thomson	15	15
(England) Watling & Bateman	2	7
(England) Hogarth & Drake	18	6	15
(England) Binyon & Stawell-Brown	13	15	10

Final
(England) Lucas & Thomson	15	15
(England) Hogarth & Drake	2	5

== Mixed doubles ==
First round
(England) Henry Marrett & Miss Dorothea Douglass	15	15
(England) Frank Abbatt & Mrs Binyon	8	9
(England) C. A. Turner & Miss Hazel Hogarth
bye
(England) S. R. Arthur & Miss M. Drake
bye
(England) Col. Ian Campbell & Miss I. F. Stone
bye
(England) Stewart Massey & Mrs Cammell
bye
(England) T. H. E. Bird & Miss Brooks
bye
(England) J. H. Colin Prior & (Republic of Ireland) Miss Mary Obré
bye
(England) H. R. Mayo & Mrs Ruth Watling
bye
(England) Albert Prebble & Miss Meriel Lucas
bye
(England) A. B Clifton & Miss C. Orr
bye
(England) Leonard Ransford & Mabel Hardy
bye
(England) George Thomas & Ethel Thomson
bye
(England) E. P. Harrison & Muriel Bateman	w/o
(England) J. C. Llewellyn & partner	scr
(England) Norman Wood & Miss E. C. Davenport	15	18
(England) W. L. G. Heelas & Miss C. M. Wilson	7	16
(England) E. Young & Margaret Larminie
bye
(England) Herbert Mellersh & Ellen Stawell-Brown
bye

Second round
(England) Marrett & Douglass	w/o
(England) Turner & Hogarth	scr
(England) Arthur & Drake	15	15
(England) Campbell & Stone	12	9
(England) Massey & Cammell	15	15
(England) Bird & Brooks	11	5
(England) Prior & Obre	15	15
(England) Mayo & Watling	7	9
(England) Prebble & Lucas	15	15
(England) Clifton & Orr	4	9
(England) Ransford & Hardy	7	17	15
(England) Thomas & Thomson	15	15	8
(England) Harrison & Bateman	15	15
(England) Wood & Davenport	5	10
(England) Young & Larminie	11	15	15
(England) Mellersh & Stawell-Brown	15	9	5

Quarter-finals
(England) Marrett & Douglass	15	15
(England) Arthur & Drake	4	3
(England) Massey & Cammell	15	15
(England) Prior & Obre	2	2
(England) Prebble & Lucas	8	15	15
(England) Ransford & Hardy	15	4	7
(England) Harrison & Bateman	15	16	15
(England) Young & Larminie	12	18	13

Semi-finals
(England) Marrett & Douglass	15	17
(England) Massey & Cammell	10	14
(England) Prebble & Lucas	15	15
(England) Harrison & Bateman	4	3

Final
(England) Marrett & Douglass	15	15
(England) Prebble & Lucas	8	7
