= Berkshire Championships =

Defunct tennis tournament
- Tour: ILTF
- Founded: 1902; 123 years ago
- Abolished: 1971; 54 years ago
- Location: Cookham; Reading; Wallingford
- Venue: Various
- Surface: Grass

The Berkshire Championships was a men's and women's international grass court tennis tournament founded by the Berkshire Lawn Tennis Association as the Berkshire County Lawn Tennis Championships in 1902. The championships were mainly held in Reading, Berkshire, England. On some occasions it was held in Wallingford now part of Oxfordshire and Cookham. It was held annually until 1971 when it was discontinued as part of the international tennis circuit.

== History ==
In 1902 Berkshire County Lawn Tennis Championships were inaugurated at District Amateur Sports Club ground, Reading, Berkshire, England, The championships were sanctioned by the Berkshire County Lawn Tennis Association.

The tournament was mainly held in Reading except from 1936 to 1938 when it was held in Wallingford. The championships were staged annually until 1971 when they were last held at the Odney Club, Cookham, Berkshire.

Former winners of the men's singles event included; Major Ritchie, Anthony Wilding, Daniel Prenn, Pat Spence, Maximilian Stolarow and Jimmy Tattersall. Previous winners of the women's singles included; Hilda Lane, Dorothea Douglass Chambers, Dorothy Holman and Kathleen Lidderdale
