= Llandudno Open =

Defunct tennis tournament
- Tour: ILTF Circuit
- Founded: 1890; 135 years ago
- Abolished: 1914; 111 years ago
- Location: Craigside, Llandudno, Wales
- Venue: Craigside Hydro Badmington and Tennis Club
- Surface: Grass

The Llandudno Open was a grass court tennis tournament first established by the Craigside Hydro Badmington and Tennis Club in 1890, and held at the Craigside Hydro Hotel, Llandudno, Caernarfonshire, North Wales. The tournament ran until 1914 when it was discontinued due to World War One.

== History ==
The name “Craigside” is that of a small headland to the west side of the Little Orme, laying east of Llandudno, North Wales. It is still separated from the main Llandudno built-up area by a small tract of farmland now occupied by Bodafon Farm Park.

Craigside was the location of the “Craigside Hydropathic Hotel or Craigside Hydro” opened in 1888 by John Smith, as a “hydrotherapy” health resort establishment, in which visitors could consult the resident physician, Dr John Miles Chambers. The tournament was staged until 1914 when it was discontinued due to World War One. During World War II the hotel was used as government offices. The hotel was demolished during the 1970s for redevelopment.

The hotel hosted a series of “Craigside” Tennis Tournaments including this tournament the Llandudno Open, as well as the national Welsh Covered Court Championships that were also played at the Craigside Hydro Indoor Covered Courts.

== Finals ==
=== Men's singles ===
(Incomplete roll).

Year	Champions	Runners-up	Score
1891	(Ireland) Manliffe Goodbody	(England) Tancred Disraeli Cummins	6–2, 6–8, 6–1, 6–2.
1892	(Ireland) Manliffe Goodbody (2)	(United Kingdom of Great Britain and Ireland) James Herbert Crispe	6–1, 6–2, 6–2.
1893	(Ireland) Manliffe Goodbody (3)	(Ireland) George Ball-Greene	1–6, 6–4, 6–3, 6–2.
1894	(United Kingdom of Great Britain and Ireland) George Miéville Simond	(United Kingdom of Great Britain and Ireland) James Herbert Crispe	1–6, 6–3, 6–2.
1896	(United Kingdom of Great Britain and Ireland) Charles Gladstone Allen	(United Kingdom of Great Britain and Ireland) Edward Roy Allen	w.o.
1900	(United Kingdom of Great Britain and Ireland) Henry Gillibrand Elwin Evered	(United Kingdom of Great Britain and Ireland) G. Slater	6–2, 6–2.
1905	(United Kingdom of Great Britain and Ireland) Henry Alfred Wallis Chiswell	(United Kingdom of Great Britain and Ireland) Philip H. Stokes	6–0, 5–7, 6–8, 6–4, 6–3.
1906	(United Kingdom of Great Britain and Ireland) Norman Cecil Frye	(Scotland) E. Warnant	6–3, 6–2, ret.
1908	(Australia) Leslie Poidevin	(England) George Watt	6–1, 6–0, 6–1.
1909	(United Kingdom of Great Britain and Ireland) Frederick Canning	(United Kingdom of Great Britain and Ireland) C. Whitehouse	4–6, 10–8, 6–3, 6–4.
1910	(United Kingdom of Great Britain and Ireland) S. Ernest Charlton	(United Kingdom of Great Britain and Ireland) W.G. Posnett	6–3, 6–4, 6–3.

=== Women's singles ===
(Incomplete roll).

Year	Champions	Runners-up	Score
1890	(England) Ida Cressy	(United Kingdom of Great Britain and Ireland) K. Grant	7–5, 6–1
1893	(England) Ellen Cressy	(England) Ida Cressy	divided prizes
1896	(England) Winifred Longhurst	(United Kingdom of Great Britain and Ireland) Emma Ridding	6–0, 6–2
1898	(England) Miss Golding	(United Kingdom of Great Britain and Ireland) Mrs Carson	6–2, 7–5
1899	(England) Ida Cressy (2)	(England) Miss Pollen	?
1900	(England) Miss Slater	(England) Ellen Evered	6–2, 6–3
1901	(United Kingdom of Great Britain and Ireland) Mrs E. Gardner	(England) Charlotte Everard	6–2, 6–1
1902	(United Kingdom of Great Britain and Ireland) Mrs E. Gardner (2)	(United Kingdom of Great Britain and Ireland) Mrs J.B. Perrett	5–7, 9–7, 6–0
1903	(England) Ellen Gardner	(United Kingdom of Great Britain and Ireland) Katherine Pick	6–2, 6–2
1904	(United Kingdom of Great Britain and Ireland) Mrs E. Gardner (3)	(United Kingdom of Great Britain and Ireland) Katherine Pick	6–1, 6–2
1905	(United Kingdom of Great Britain and Ireland) K.I. Manning	(United Kingdom of Great Britain and Ireland) C. Duerden	8–6, 6–8, 6–0
1907	(United Kingdom of Great Britain and Ireland) A. Reeves	(United Kingdom of Great Britain and Ireland) C. Duerden	6–0, 6–4
1908	(United Kingdom of Great Britain and Ireland) Elizabeth Lunt Heatley	(England) Charlotte Everard	6–0, 6–1
1909	(United Kingdom of Great Britain and Ireland) M. Fergus	(United Kingdom of Great Britain and Ireland) Elizabeth Lunt Heatley	4–6, 6–2, 6–1
1911	(United Kingdom of Great Britain and Ireland) Ethel Tanner	(United Kingdom of Great Britain and Ireland) M. Smith	6–2, 7–5
1912	(United Kingdom of Great Britain and Ireland) M.K. Smith	(United Kingdom of Great Britain and Ireland) Elizabeth Lunt Heatley	7–9, 6–3, 6–1
1913	(Argentina) Dorothy Boadle	(England) Charlotte Everard	6–2, 6–4
1914	(United Kingdom of Great Britain and Ireland) M.K. Smith (2)	(England) Charlotte Everard	6–4, 6–2
