= Rosamund Colman =

Welsh tennis player

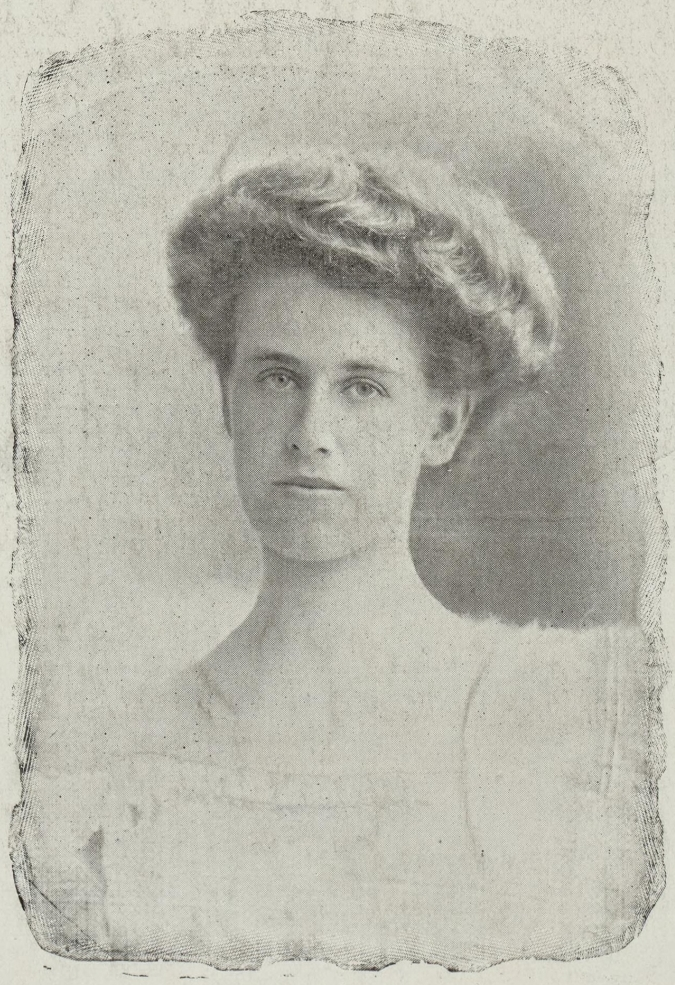
- Rosamund Victoria Salusbury in 1909
- Full name: Rosamund Victoria Collmann
- Country (sports): United Kingdom
- Born: June 1885 Bach-y-graig, St Asaph, Denbighshire, Wales
- Died: 1950 Dover, Kent, England
- Turned pro: 1905 (amateur)
- Retired: 1912

Singles
- Career record: 80–33
- Career titles: 18

Grand Slam singles results
- Wimbledon: 3R (1911)

Rosamund Victoria Colman née; Salusbury (June 1885 – 1950) was a Welsh golf and tennis player and a member of the Salusbury family. She competed at the Wimbledon Championships 1910 and 1911. She was active from 1905 to 1912 and won 18 career singles titles.

== Tennis career ==
Rosamund was born in June 1885 on the Bach-y-graig Estate, St Asaph, Denbighshire, Wales, the daughter of Edward Pemeberton Salusbury Esq and Julia Melville Smith. Rosamund started playing tournaments around 1904/5 though she mainly competed at events on the French Riviera circuit, the Italian Riviera, in Germany and in Switzerland. In 1909 she was residing in Dover, Kent, England.

She competed at the 1910 Wimbledon Championships where she lost in the second round to Winifred McNair, and at the 1911 Wimbledon Championships where she reached the third round, but was beaten by Marie Hazel.

Her main career singles successes include winning the Italian Riviera Championships three times (1908, 1910, 1911), Eastern Germany Championships two times (1907–1908), the Mid-Kent Championships two times (1909–1910), the Monte Carlo Championships two times (1910–1911), the French Riviera Championships two times (1909–1910), Franzensbad (1906), Frankfurt-am-Main (1907), the French Switzerland Championships (1908), Heiligendamm (1908), Les Avants Championship (1908), Nice Lawn Tennis Club Championships (1909), the South of France Championships (1910)

She was also a finalist at the Championships of Leipzig (1906), Swiss International Championships (1906), Heiligendamm (1907), Wiesbaden Championship (1907), German International Championships (1908), South of France Championships (1908) French Switzerland Championships (1909), North of England Championships (1910), Cannes Championships (1911),

== Golf career ==
She was also The Lady Golf Champion of Switzerland (1907–1908).

== Family ==
She was the daughter of Edward Pemeberton Salusbury Esq (born 2 November 1854), Captain and Hon. Major 3rd Battalion Shropshire Light Infantry. Her mother was Julia Melville Smith she was the daughter of James White Smith of Kathali, Bengal, British India. Her parents married on 2 January 1884. Their second child was Edward Clare Frederick Salusbury (born 10 May 1886) her brother. her great grandfather was John Salusbury Piozzi Salusbury. She married Charles Frederick Colman, in September 1912 in St Asaph, Denbighshire. He died 1 February 1922.
