= Donald Leahong =

Jamaican tennis player

- Full name: Donald Arthur Leahong
- Country (sports): Jamaica
- Born: 7 December 1912; Kingston, Jamaica
- Died: 15 February 2007 (aged 94); Miami, Florida, U.S.
- Plays: Right-handed

Singles
- Career titles: 11

Grand Slam singles results
- French Open: 2R (1930)
- Wimbledon: 1R (1930)
Medal record
Central American and Caribbean Games
Gold medal – first place	1938 Panama City	Men's singles

Donald Arthur Leahong (7 December 1912 — 15 February 2007) was a Jamaican tennis player. He won the singles gold medal at the 1938 Central American and Caribbean Games.

== Career ==
Leahong, born in Kingston and of Chinese descent, was a product of Wolmer's Boys' School, where he played Manning Cup soccer. In the 1930s he was the leading tennis player on the island, winning seven All-Jamaica Championships singles titles. During a 1930 tour of England he won the East Grinstead Open, the Essex Championships and was beaten by Harry Hopman in the first round of the Wimbledon Championships. In 1934 he made the singles quarter-finals and doubles final of the Canadian Championships. In 1937 he won the Jamaican International Championships. In 1938 he won the Central American Championships held at Panama City. He was also the men's singles gold medalist at the 1938 Central American and Caribbean Games.

Post-tennis, Leahong became a solicitor and retired to Miami, Florida.
