= Jamaican International Championships =

Defunct tennis tournament
- Tour: ILTF Circuit
- Founded: 1924; 102 years ago
- Abolished: 1939; 87 years ago
- Location: Kingston, Jamaica
- Venue: Liguanea Club (1924–37, 1939); Unifruit Co. Club (1938)
- Surface: Hard

The Jamaican International Championships was a men's international tennis tournament founded in 1924 and played on outdoor hard courts at the Liguanea Club, Kingston, Jamaica. The championships were held until 1939.

== History ==
The Jamaican International Championships was a men's international tennis tournament founded in 1924 and played on outdoor hard courts at the Liguanea Club, Kingston, Jamaica.

In 1938, the tournament was moved to Unifruit Company Club for one edition only. The championships were held until 1939 when they were discontinued due to World War II.

The championships were a stop on the Caribbean Circuit, that was a winter leg of the ILTF Circuit from the 1920s to the 1930s. This event was succeeded by the Kingston International Championships which did resume after World War Two.

== Finals ==
=== Men's Singles ===
(incomplete roll)

Year	Champion	Runner-up	Score
1924	(United States) Vinnie Richards	(United States) Harold Throckmorton	6–2, 9–7, 6–1
1925	(United States) Vinnie Richards (2)	(Japan) Takeichi Harada	6–3, 6–2, 3–6, 6–4
1926	(Japan) Takeichi Harada	(United States) Alfred Chapin	6–3, 3–6, 4–6, 9–7, 6–1
1934	(United States) George Lott	(Jamaica) Donald Leahong	6–2, 6–1, 6–2
1937	(Jamaica) Donald Leahong	(Cuba) Ricardo Morales	12–10, 6–2, 2–6, 3–6, 6–4
1938	(United States) Arthur Hendrix	(Jamaica) Donald Leahong	6–4, 1–6, 9–7, 6–1
1939	(United States) Hal Surface	(United Kingdom) Charles Hare	8–6, 6–4
Event discontinued
