= Nevill Cobbold =

English footballer (1863–1922)

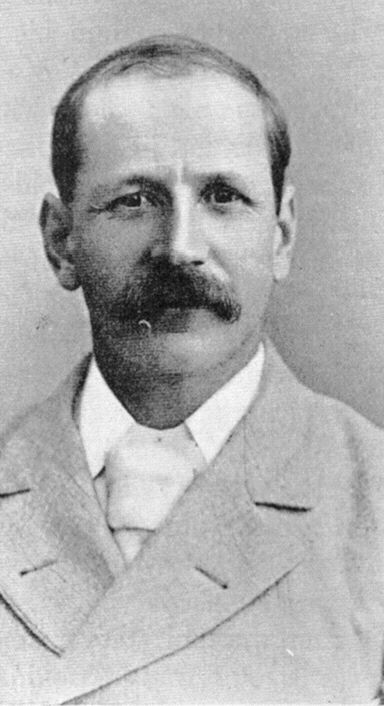

Personal information
- Full name: William Nevill Cobbold
- Date of birth: 4 February 1863
- Place of birth: Long Melford, England
- Date of death: 8 April 1922 (aged 59)
- Place of death: West Wratting, England
- Position: Forward

Senior career*
Years	Team	Apps	(Gls)
- Long Melford
1883–1886	Cambridge University		
1882-1888	Old Carthusians	16	(15)
1885–1888	Corinthians	46	(40)

International career
1883–1887	England	9	(6)
- * Club domestic league appearances and goals

William Nevill Cobbold (4 February 1863 – 8 April 1922), familiarly known as Nevill or "Nuts" Cobbold, was one of the leading footballers of the Victorian era and on several occasions a member of the England national football team. As late as 1922, at the time of his death, he could be described as "the most famous association football forward of all time", and certainly – in the words of his Times obituary – "the most individually brilliant dribbler, the player who could most often put in those thrusts that no skill could parry".

== Early life and education ==
Nevill was born in Long Melford, England, the son of a vicar, Edward Augustus Cobbold of the Cobbold family. "Nuts" was educated at Charterhouse School, one of the great nurseries of the association game, and Jesus College, Cambridge. As well as playing for the village team, he represented Cambridge University, Old Carthusians, and the Corinthians. While at university, Cobbold played in four consecutive varsity matches against Oxford University, winning each of them. His nickname, given to him during his time at school, was awarded – thought C.B. Fry – "possibly because he was the very best Kentish cob quality, all kernel and extremely hard to crack."

== Playing style and reputation ==
Cobbold starred on his international debut in England's 7–0 demolition of Ireland in February 1883, scoring twice in three minutes, and was frequently described as the trickiest and most elegant forward in the world at this time. "If one were to ask, Who were the three greatest forwards of all time?" wrote William Pickford and Alfred Gibson in 1906, "no matter what other two were named, W.N. Cobbold would perhaps come first to the lips."

Playing generally at inside left, "Nuts" was considered to have the ideal build for a striker of his period. "The best type of forward player," wrote Montague Shearman in 1887, "is the fast, sturdy man of medium height, like W.N. Cobbold the Cantab." It was true, Pickford and Gibson went on, that Cobbold was pre-eminently an old-style dribbling forward, who had learned his football in the years before the advent of the "combination" (passing) game at the end of the 1870s: "In those days 'dribbling' was the great game, and one only passed the ball when one was completely hemmed in, and not always even then." But "Nuts" was far more than a mere dribbler, the authors stressed:

"He was essentially a scoring forward, and one, too, that made most of his own chances. One could not, for instance, conceive a greater contrast in style than Cobbold and Bloomer, both inside forwards. The former was almost continuously on the ball, while the Derby man seems to be doing nothing, and doing it well, for the greater part of the game. When Cobbold got possession of the ball he seemed to keep it glued to his toe, darting hither and thither as he pursued a tortuous course towards goal. One man was practically powerless to stop him. Two men might stay his career by dividing their attentions between the man and the ball, but they were not always successful even then. Very frequently Cobbold would shoulder his way through a whole crowd of the opposition and emerge triumphant with the ball at his toe. He was built for hard, strenuous play."

G.O. Smith, the centre-forward who followed Cobbold to Charterhouse and later into the England team, shared Pickford and Gibson’s high regard for “Nuts”. Recalling him in April 1943, Smith declared: “I put him first among all the forwards I have known.” Although made many years after Cobbold’s playing career, Smith’s judgement offers a view on how Cobbold was viewed by his peers.

Cobbold's other great attribute was his speed. In his prime he was a considerable sprinter, his obituary in The Times recalling: "Who that ever saw him speeding away down Parker's Piece will ever forget it? He was extraordinarily hard to stop and extremely fast." Although in essence a one-paced player, lacking the ability – so conspicuously displayed by Stanley Matthews – to stop, start and accelerate, Cobbold nonetheless possessed the exceptional ball control required to make him a most daunting opponent. "No man that ever played," wrote Pickford and Gibson, "could control the ball so effectively as Cobbold could when travelling at full speed... [He was] inimitable, the finest and fastest dribbler the Association game has known."

He also has remarkable skill as a goal scorer, which must be combined to his running and dribbling talent. Given two feet of a goal to aim at, Cobbold was famed for his accuracy, and it was said that "Nuts" would always strike the target. The striker had, most contemporaries agreed, one of the fiercest shots yet seen. "He could shoot in any position," was the verdict of Pickford and Gibson, "and he sent the ball in like a charge from a hundred-ton gun."

Cobbold anticipated the professional game in one respect (noted Edward Grayson, the historian of the early amateurs), "for in order to avoid getting hurt, he turned out swathed in rubber bandages and ankle guards." He belonged, nonetheless, resolutely to the earliest period of Association Football, disdaining – in common with many footballers of his generation – the aerial game, then regarded as a novel and distasteful innovation, and "eliminating all heading from his play." "Nuts" also declined to modify his dribbling style with the advent of new tactics for "passing forward" in the early 1880s – partly, speculated Pickford and Gibson, "because in his day they had not been sufficiently developed and partly because he himself was a man of infinite resource." He was generally credited with the tactical innovation of dropping back one of the two centre forwards to be a centre half-back. Those who had seen the player in his prime sometimes debated how "Nuts" would have fared against the better organised defences of the 1890s. "The chances," Gibson and Pickford concluded in their assessment, "are that against three of our strongest half-backs he would have had to considerably modify his methods."

Cobbold accumulated a total of nine England caps, a good number at a time when only three international matches were played each year, scoring six England goals in total. His final international appearance came in a narrow March 1887 defeat to Scotland.

== Other sports ==
=== Cricket ===
Although regarded by his friend G.O. Smith as scarcely in the first rank of cricketers, Cobbold played once for Kent, scoring four runs, and, after his retirement from football, persisted with cricket and took up golf. Playing against lesser opposition "Nuts" could be a formidable batsman; the first wicket partnership of 440 runs he notched with WR Gray for West Wratting, a small village in Cambridgeshire, against Fitzwilliam Hostel in 1891 remains, more than a century later, among the ten highest ever recorded in minor cricket.

=== Tennis ===
Cobbold was also a notable lawn tennis player and competed at seventeen tournaments between 1882 and 1891. He won six career singles titles including the East Grinstead Open three times (1882, 1883, 1887), Leicester Open (1885), Kent LTC Championships (1886), and East of England Championships (1889). In 1885 he played at the prestigious Northern Championships at that time considered one of the most important tournaments in the world. He reached the quarter finals stage before losing to Ernest Wool Lewis then considered one of the world's best players. At Cambridge University he also took part in the Cambridge University LTC Tournament (1883, 1885).

== Later life ==
In later life he was a schoolteacher, working principally as a "crammer" who specialised in preparing boys for entrance to the British Army. Cobbold suffered considerably from ill health in the years leading to his death – problems his obituarist attributed to his capacity for sheer hard work. He died at West Wratting.
