= Dorothy Boadle =

Argentine tennis player (1885–1972)

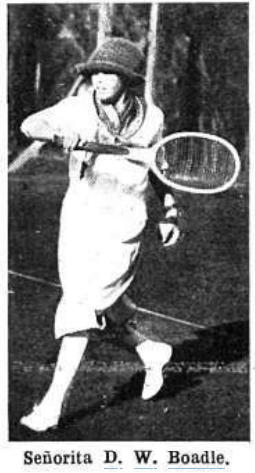
- Full name: Dorothy Whitefield Boadle
- Country (sports): Argentina
- Born: 12 December 1885 Caballito, Buenos Aires, Argentina
- Died: 1972 (aged 86–87) Mendoza, Argentina
- Turned pro: 1906 (amateur tour)
- Retired: 1924

Singles
- Career titles: 11

Grand Slam singles results
- Wimbledon: 3R (1913)

Doubles
- Career titles: 1

Mixed doubles
- Career titles: 3

Dorothy Whitefield Boadle (12 December 1885 - 5 February 1972) known later by her married name Dorothy Brown after her tennis career had finished was an Argentine born tennis player. She played at Wimbledon three times in 1907, 1910 and 1913. She was active from 1906 to 1924 and contested 15 career singles finals, and won 11 titles.

== Career ==
Dorothy Brown was born Dorothy Boadle on 12 Dec 1885 in Caballito, Buenos Aires, Argentina, the second daughter of Thomas Scott Boadle and his wife was a representative of the Holt Shipping Company of Liverpool who moved to Buenos Aires in 1878. Dorothy was one of three lawn tennis playing sisters the others being Winifred Mary Boadle born (1884) and Marjorie Scott Boadle born (1889).

Her main career singles highlights include winning the River Plate Championships eight times (1906, 1908–09, 1911–12, 1914–15, 1917). During her trips to England to compete at the Wimbledon Championships she took part in other tournaments mainly in North Wales, near the Wirral where her father was born. In 1913 she won the Llandudno Open at Llandudno against Charlotte Everard, and the Colwyn Bay Open the same year.

In 1915 she won the Campeonatos de Río de la Plata doubles title with Miss J.A. Hinds and the mixed doubles title with G.C. Drysdale. In 1920 she won the North Wales Championships at Criccieth, that year she was also finalist at the Reigate Open losing to Agnes Tuckey and took part in the Kent Coast Championships at Hythe where she lost in the fourth round. In 1922 she won the mixed doubles event again at the River Plate Championships partnered with Alfredo Villegas, and again in 1924 with Carlos Dumas.

In April 1925 she married Philip Leslie Brown in Argentina which took her off the ILTF Circuit she then retired. She died in Mendoza, Argentina in 1972.

== Family ==
The family of Thomas Scott Boadle born (1849) and his wife Leonora Boadle née van Fowinkel included his three daughters and a son Alan Boadle. The father was a representative of the Holt Shipping Company of Liverpool who moved to Buenos Aires in 1878, he later set up his own company TS Boadle and Co. In 1892 he was a founding member of Buenos Aires Lawn Tennis Club, as its first secretary and treasurer, and then president from 1896 until he retired in 1907. She married Philip Leslie Brown on 27 April 1925.
