= Violet Pinckney =

British tennis player

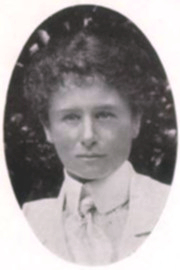
- Full name: Violet Millicent Pinckney
- Country (sports): England
- Born: 11 March 1871 Alderbury, Wiltshire, England
- Died: 13 March 1955 (aged 84) New Forest, Hampshire, England

Singles

Grand Slam singles results
- Wimbledon: QF (1906, 1908, 1920)

Doubles

Grand Slam doubles results
- Wimbledon: SF (1914)

Violet Millicent Pinckney (11 March 1871 – 13 March 1955) was an English tennis player. Pinckney was born at Alderbury, Wiltshire, in 1871 to Major William Pinckney and his wife Frances Charlotte Everett. In 1903 she won the German Championships. She took part in the 1908 Summer Olympics, but lost in the initial round to Gladys Eastlake-Smith. In 1907 and 1908 she won the London Championships. She competed in 12 editions of the Wimbledon Championships between 1903 and 1925. Her best result in the singles event was reaching the quarterfinal in 1906, 1908 and 1920 while in doubles she reached the semifinal in 1914 partnering Marguerite Broquedis.

Pinckney died at New Forest, Hampshire in March 1955.
