= 1913 Wimbledon Championships =

- Date: June 23 – July 4
- Edition: 37th
- Category: Grand Slam
- Surface: Grass
- Location: Worple Road; SW19, Wimbledon, London, United Kingdom
- Venue: All England Lawn Tennis and Croquet Club

Champions

Men's singles
- (New Zealand) Anthony Wilding

Women's singles
- (United Kingdom) Dorothea Lambert Chambers

Men's doubles
- (United Kingdom) Herbert Roper Barrett / (United Kingdom) Charles Dixon

Women's doubles
- (United Kingdom) Dora Boothby / (United Kingdom) Winifred McNair

Mixed doubles
- (United Kingdom) Hope Crisp / (United Kingdom) Agnes Tuckey
- Wimbledon Championships

The 1913 Wimbledon Championships took place on the outdoor grass courts at the All England Lawn Tennis and Croquet Club in Wimbledon, London, United Kingdom. The tournament ran from 23 June until 4 July. It was the 37th staging of the Wimbledon Championships, and the first Grand Slam tennis event of 1913.

The 1913 Wimbledon Championships for the first time included a Women's doubles and Mixed doubles competition. The men's entry consisted of 116 competitors and was won by defending champion Anthony Wilding.

== Champions ==
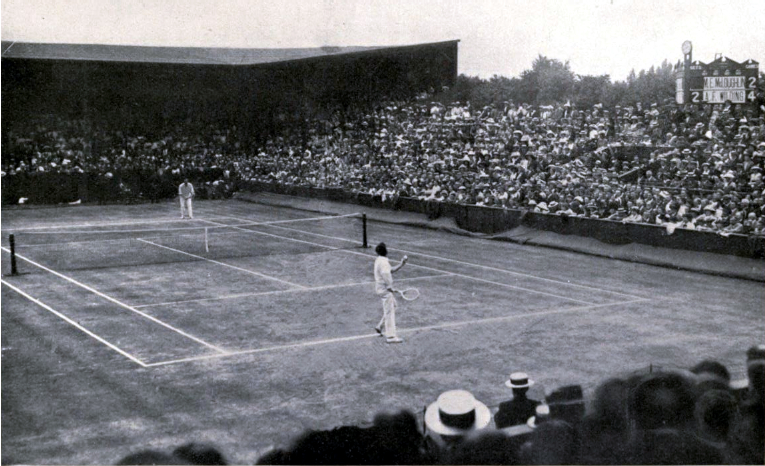
Wimbledon finals 1913, Wilding (far side) vs McLoughlin (near side).

=== Men's singles ===
(New Zealand) Anthony Wilding defeated (United States) Maurice McLoughlin, 8–6, 6–3, 10–8

=== Women's singles ===
(United Kingdom) Dorothea Lambert Chambers defeated (United Kingdom) Winifred McNair, 6–0, 6–4

=== Men's doubles ===
(United Kingdom) Herbert Roper Barrett / (United Kingdom) Charles Dixon defeated (Germany) Heinrich Kleinschroth / (Germany) Friedrich Rahe, 6–2, 6–4, 4–6, 6–2

=== Women's doubles ===
(United Kingdom) Dora Boothby' / (United Kingdom) Winifred McNair defeated (United Kingdom) Dorothea Lambert Chambers / (United Kingdom) Charlotte Sterry, 4–6, 2–4 retired

=== Mixed doubles ===
(United Kingdom) Hope Crisp / (United Kingdom) Agnes Tuckey defeated (United Kingdom) James Cecil Parke / (United Kingdom) Ethel Larcombe, 3–6, 5–3 retired

Preceded by 1912 Australasian Championships	Grand Slams	Succeeded by 1913 U.S. National Championships
