= Hilda Lane =

English tennis player

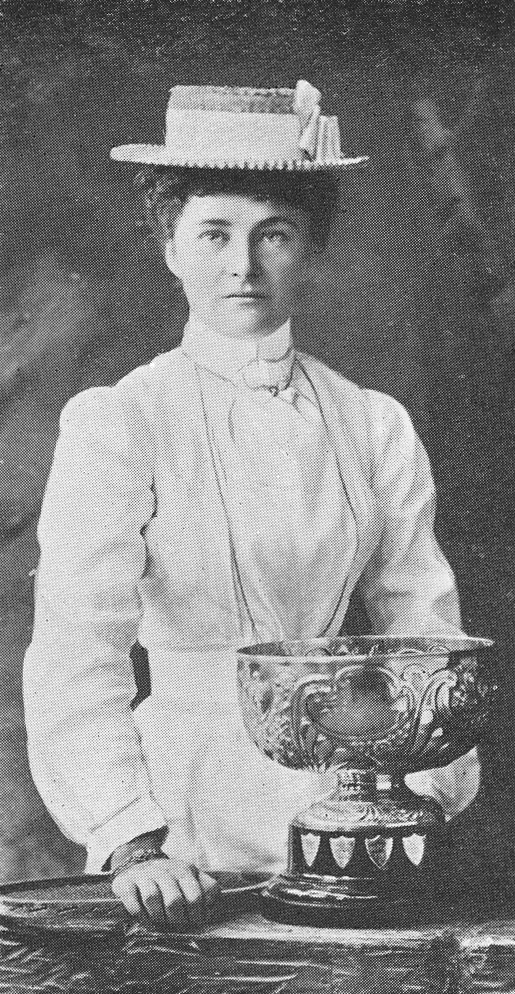
- Lane, ca. 1903
- Country (sports): United Kingdom
- Born: 1877 Moradbad, Uttar Pradesh, British India
- Died: 17 December 1916 (Age 38) Hove, Sussex, England

Singles
- Career titles: 17

Grand Slam singles results
- Wimbledon: QF (1902)

Doubles

Grand Slam doubles results
- Wimbledon: 1R (1914)

Hilda Lane (1877 – 17 December 1916) was an English tennis player active during the first decade and a half of the 20th century.

== Career ==
Between 1902 and 1914 she participated in the single event of the Wimbledon Championships and achieved her best result in her first appearance in 1902 when she reached the quarterfinal in which eventual champions Muriel Robb beat her in straight sets. In 1914 she also competed in the doubles event with Madeline O'Neill but lost in the first round.

In 1902 she won the all-comer's tournament at the Kent Championships after her opponent Edith Greville retired at one set all but subsequently lost the challenge round match against Dorothea Douglass. The challenge round match was postponed from 14 June to 5 July due to rain. In 1903 she took part in the East Grinstead Open tennis tournament held at the East Grinstead, West Sussex she would win the title eight times from (1903–1906, 1908, 1911–1913).

In 1905 she defeated Gladys Eastlake Smith in the singles final of the British Covered Court Championships, played on wood courts at the Queen's Club in London. The following year, 1906, she lost her title in the challenge round to Dorothea Douglass. In August 1913 she was runner-up at the Derbyshire Championships in Buxton, losing the final to Ethel Thomson Larcombe in straight sets.

Her other career singles highlights include winning the Norfolk Championships five times (1909–11, 1913–14), and the Mid-Kent Championships three times (1898-1900).

== Personal ==
She was the daughter of Wilmot Lane, a barrister-at-law who had been a civil servant in India having been appointed to the Bengal civil service in 1854, in 1877 around the time of Hilda's birth he was a civil and sessions judge based at Moradbad, Uttar Pradesh, and the sister of tennis player Elsie Lane.
