= Ruth Winch =

British tennis player

- Full name: Ruth Isabel Winch
- Country (sports): United Kingdom
- Born: 25 August 1870 Ryde, Isle of Wight, England, UK
- Died: 9 January 1952 (aged 81) Beaumaris, Isle of Anglesey, Wales, UK

Singles

Grand Slam singles results
- Wimbledon: QF (1904, 1919)

Doubles

Grand Slam doubles results
- Wimbledon: 1R (1922)

Grand Slam mixed doubles results
- US Open: 1R (1919, 1922)
Medal record
Women's tennis
Bronze medal – third place	1908 London	Singles

Ruth Isabel Winch (née Legh, 25 August 1870 – 9 January 1952) was a British tennis player who won a bronze medal at the 1908 Summer Olympics in London.

Winch had a walkover in both round one and the quarter finals of the 1908 women's singles competition. In the semi-final she lost to Dorothea Chambers 6–1, 6–1.

From 1899 to 1922, Winch participated in nine editions of the Wimbledon Championships. Her best results in the singles event were achieved in 1904 and 1919 when she reached the quarterfinals.

In March 1907, she won the singles title at the Championship of Cannes, defeating Toupie Lowther in the final in straight sets.
