= Edith Johnson (tennis) =

English field hockey, tennis and badminton player

- Full name: Emily Frances Godschall Johnson
- Born: 31 January 1874 East Molesey, Surrey, UK
- Died: 9 February 1950 (aged 76) Cuckfield, West Sussex, UK

Emily Frances Godschall Johnson, better known as Edith Johnson (1874–1950) was an English field hockey, tennis and badminton player. She was the first women's captain of the England hockey team and a runner-up at the 1910 Wimbledon Championships – Women's singles.

In hockey, Johnson played as a centre half-back and captained teams including Molesey Hockey Club, Surrey, and the South. In 1895, she was a founding member of the All England Women's Hockey Association, where she was selected as the captain of the first international England women's hockey team. She captained the England team on at least a dozen occasions including England's first official match against Ireland in 1896.

She was an all-round sportswoman, playing tennis at Wimbledon, where she competed in the singles from 1901 to 1914. In 1910, she reached the All Comers' Final. In addition to tennis and hockey she played badminton for the East Molesey club and played at the All England Open Badminton Championships on several occasions.
