= Dora Boothby =

English badminton and tennis player

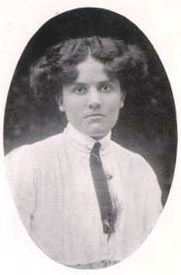
- Full name: Penelope Dora Harvey Boothby
- Country (sports): United Kingdom
- Born: 2 August 1881 Finchley, England
- Died: 22 February 1970 (aged 88) Hammersmith, England

Singles

Grand Slam singles results
- Wimbledon: W (1909)

Doubles

Grand Slam doubles results
- Wimbledon: W (1913)

Grand Slam mixed doubles results
- Wimbledon: 3R (1913)
Medal record
Olympic Games – Tennis
Silver medal – second place	1908 London	Singles

Penelope Dora Harvey Boothby (2 August 1881 – 22 February 1970) was an English tennis and badminton player. She was born in Finchley, Middlesex. She is best remembered for her ladies' singles title at the 1909 Wimbledon Championships. In Badminton, she won the 1909 All England Championships in mixed doubles category.

== Biography ==
Boothby was born in Finchley and, with her older sister Gertrude, lived there with her step-parents Harry and Gertrude Penn. Harry was a civil engineer, and by 1901, they had moved to South Norwood, where she played at Beulah Hill Club, and during the winter months, she played badminton.

In 1908, she won a silver medal in the women's singles event at the 1908 Summer Olympics.

In 1909, when she won the Ladies' Singles at Wimbledon, the runner-up of the Men's Singles, Josiah Ritchie, was also living in Norwood. Also in 1909, she won the singles title of the British Covered Court Championships, played on wood courts at the Queen's Club in London, after defeating Madeline O’Neill in the final in straight sets.

In 1911, she became the first female player to lose a Wimbledon final without winning a game, losing to Dorothea Douglass Lambert Chambers 6–0, 6–0.

In 1914, she married Arthur C. Geen, a professional architect.

She died in Hammersmith or Hampstead, London in 1970.

== Grand Slam finals ==
=== Singles (1 titles, 2 runners-up) ===
Result	Year	Championship	Surface	Opponent	Score
Win	1909^{1}	Wimbledon	Grass	(United Kingdom) Agnes Morton	6–4, 4–6, 8–6
Loss	1910	Wimbledon	Grass	(United Kingdom) Dorothea Lambert Chambers	2–6, 2–6
Loss	1911	Wimbledon	Grass	(United Kingdom) Dorothea Lambert Chambers	0–6, 0–6

^{1}This was actually the all-comers final as Charlotte Cooper Sterry did not defend her 1908 Wimbledon title, which resulted in the winner of the all-comers final winning the challenge round and thus Wimbledon in 1909 by walkover.

=== Doubles (1 title) ===
Result	Year	Championship	Surface	Partner	Opponents	Score
Win	1913	Wimbledon	Grass	(United Kingdom) Winifred McNair	(United Kingdom) Charlotte Cooper Sterry (United Kingdom) Dorothea Lambert Chambers	4–6, 2–4 ret.
