= Edith Austin =

Welsh tennis player (1867–1953)

- Full name: Edith Lucy Austin Greville
- Country (sports): United Kingdom
- Born: 15 December 1867 Hawarden, Flintshire, Wales
- Died: 27 July 1953 (aged 85) Fulham, London, England
- Turned pro: 1888 (amateur circuit)
- Retired: 1919

Singles
- Career titles: 19

Grand Slam singles results
- Wimbledon: F^{AC} (1894, 1896)

Doubles

Grand Slam doubles results
- Wimbledon: QF (1913)

Grand Slam mixed doubles results
- Wimbledon: 3R (1919)

Edith Lucy Austin Greville (15 December 1867 – 27 July 1953) was a Welsh tennis player who was active from 1888 until 1919. She was two time singles finalist at Wimbledon, and won 19 singles titles. She was married to fellow player George Greville.

== Career ==
Austin was born in Hawarden, Flintshire, North Wales to Rev. Edward and Elizabeth Austin. They moved to Broadhempston, Devon, where her father was the vicar, and later to Rendlesham, Suffolk, where her father was the rector.

Between 1893 and 1919, she participated 16 times in the singles event of the Wimbledon Championships and achieved her best results in 1894 and 1896 when she reached the final of the all-comers tournament. In 1894 she lost to Blanche Hillyard in straight sets, winning just two games and Hillyard became champions as the title holder Lottie Dod did not defend her title. In 1896 she lost the all-comers final in three sets to Alice Pickering. In her last two Wimbledon appearances in 1913 and 1919 she also played in the doubles and mixed doubles events.

In 1891 she won the Exmouth LTC Tournament against Lilian Pine-Coffin. She also won the singles title at the Kent Championships on six occasions (1894–97, 1899, 1900). She won the Middlesex Championships in 1894 and again in 1905. In 1894, she defeated May Arbuthnot in a three-set final to win the singles title of the British Covered Court Championships, played on wood courts at the Queen's Club in London. Arbuthnot failed to convert two matchpoints. The following year, 1895, she lost her title in the challenge round to Charlotte Cooper. From 1896 to 1899 she won four consecutive titles, defeating Cooper twice in the final. In 1894, 1899 and 1901 she won the London Championships grass court tournament.

In 1896 she was a runner-up at the South of England Championships in Eastbourne, losing the final to Blanche Bingley-Hillyard in three sets.

In 1899, she married fellow tennis player Turketil George Pearson Greville, son of Rear Admiral John Stapleton Greville, descended from the Earls of Warwick.
