= Mildred Coles (tennis) =

British tennis player

- Full name: Mildred Coles
- Born: 9 April 1876; Cranbrook, Kent, Great Britain
- Died: 24 February 1937 (aged 60)
- Turned pro: 1902 (amateur)
- Retired: 1927

Singles
- Career titles: 20

Grand Slam singles results
- Wimbledon: QF (1911, 1913)

Doubles

Grand Slam doubles results
- Wimbledon: 3R (1924)

Grand Slam mixed doubles results
- Wimbledon: 2R (1913)

Mildred Coles (9 April 1876 – 24 February 1937) was a British tennis player. She was a two-time quarter finalist in singles at the 1911 Wimbledon Championships and 1913 Wimbledon Championships.

== Career ==
Mildred Coles was born 9 April 1876 in Cranbrook, Kent, England. Her tennis career began in 1902 and that year she reached the final of the Belgian Championships where she shared the title with Mabel Squire, she would go on to win that title a further two times in 1907 and 1909.. She competed in the women's singles event at the 1908 Summer Olympics. She competed at the Wimbledon Championships twelve times between 1905 and 1927, where she reached the quarter-finals in the singles events in 1911 and 1913.

Her other singles career highlights included winning the Rochester Open at Rochester, Kent six times (1904–07, 1922, 1924).

Coles also won the Mid-Kent Championships at Maidstone four times (1903–04, 1911, 1914). Additionally she also won titles at Hythe (1922), Margate, (1924), Herne Bay (1924–25) and Chatham (1927). She was also a losing finalist at Reading (1924) and Wentworth (1926). She was active until 1927.
