= Gwendoline Eastlake-Smith =

British tennis player

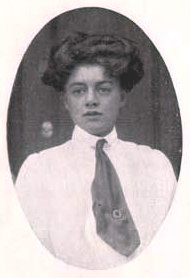
- Eastlake-Smith, prior to 1910
- Born: Gladys Shirley Eastlake Smith; 14 August 1883; Sydenham, Lewisham, Kent
- Died: 18 September 1941 (aged 58); Middleham, North Yorkshire
- Occupation: Tennis player
- Known for: Olympic Gold Medalist
- Spouse: Wharram Henry Lamplough

Olympic medal record

Tennis
Gold medal – first place	1908 London	Women's singles-indoors

Gladys Shirley Eastlake Smith (14 August 1883 – 18 September 1941), also known as Gwendoline Eastlake-Smith and Gladys Lamplough (after her marriage), was a British tennis player. She won an Olympic gold medal at the 1908 Summer Olympics in London.

== Early life ==
Gladys Shirley Eastlake Smith was born in Sydenham, Lewisham, Kent on 14 August 1883, daughter of Charles Eastlake Smith and Lizzie, daughter of George P. Cooper. Her father's aunt was the author and literary critic Elizabeth, Lady Eastlake. Her father, a manufacturing company manager and former insurance clerk, had played football for England as a forward in 1876.

== Tennis career ==
She won the All England covered mixed doubles in 1905 with Reginald Doherty. She won the Monte Carlo Championships in 1906, 1907 and 1908, the London Covered Court Championships ladies singles in October 1906 and April 1907, and reached the final in October 1907. She won the All England covered mixed doubles a second time in 1908 with Anthony Wilding. The same year, she won the Women's indoor singles at the Olympic Games in London. She beat fellow Briton Violet Pinkney 7–5, 7–5 in the quarter-finals; Swede Elsa Wallenberg 6–4, 6–4 in the semi-finals; and another compatriot Alice Greene 6–2, 4–6, 6–0 in the final.

Two days after winning the Olympic final, she married Wharram Henry Lamplough, a physician and surgeon. She reached the semi-finals in the ladies singles at Wimbledon, under her married name, in 1908 and 1910, and won the London Championships ladies singles title at Queen's Club in 1910. She won the "Married Doubles" in 1913 with her husband. She last competed in the ladies singles at Wimbledon in 1921.
