= Madeline O'Neill =

British tennis player

- Full name: Madeline Alice O'Neill
- Country (sports): (United Kingdom) Great Britain
- Born: 2 September 1867
- Died: 3 June 1934 (aged 66)
- Turned pro: 1897 (amateur)
- Retired: 1923

Singles

Grand Slam singles results
- Wimbledon: QF (1909, 1913)

Doubles

Grand Slam doubles results
- Wimbledon: 1R (1913, 1914)

Mixed doubles

Grand Slam mixed doubles results
- Wimbledon: SF (1913)

Madeline Alice O'Neill (2 September 1867 - 3 June 1934), also known as Madeleine O'Neill (née Madeline Alice Fisher), was a British tennis player. She was a two-time singles quarterfinalist at the 1913 Wimbledon Championships and 1914 Wimbledon Championships, and won the Scottish Championships in 1898.

== Career ==
She was born Madeline Alice Fisher in 1867. Since 1905, O'Neill competed in the Wimbledon Championships. In 1909 and 1913, she reached the quarterfinals of the singles competition. In mixed doubles, she reached the semifinals with Norman Kidson in 1913. She also won the Scottish Championships in 1898.

In 1922, O'Neill took part in the Wimbledon singles for the last time and won two matches. Aged 54 at the time, she still remains the oldest player to ever have won a match at the Wimbledon singles.
