= 1913 Wimbledon Championships – Men's doubles =

Men's doubles
- 1913 Wimbledon Championships

Final
- Champions: (United Kingdom) Herbert Roper Barrett (United Kingdom) Charles Dixon
- Runners-up: (Germany) Heinrich Kleinschroth (Germany) Friedrich Rahe
- Score: 6–2, 6–4, 4–6, 6–2

Details
- Draw: 48
- Seeds: –

Events
Singles	men	women		boys	girls
Doubles	men	women	mixed	boys	girls
- Wimbledon Championships

Heinrich Kleinschroth and Friedrich Rahe defeated Alfred Beamish and James Cecil Parke 6–3, 6–2, 6–4 in the All Comers' Final, but the reigning champions Herbert Roper Barrett and Charles Dixon defeated Kleinschroth and Rahe 6–2, 6–4, 4–6, 6–2 in the challenge round to win the gentlemen's doubles tennis title at the 1913 Wimbledon Championships.

== Draw ==
Key

- Q = Qualifier
- WC = Wild card
- LL = Lucky loser
- Alt = Alternate
- ITF = ITF entry
- PR = Protected ranking
- SR = Special ranking
- SE = Special exempt
- JE = Junior exempt
- JR = Junior Accelerator Programme entrant
- CO = College Accelerator Programme entrant
- NG = Next Gen Accelerator Program entrant
- w/o = Walkover
- r = Retired
- d = Defaulted

=== Challenge round ===
Challenge Round
(Germany) Heinrich Kleinschroth (Germany) Friedrich Rahe	2	4	6	2
(United Kingdom) Herbert Roper Barrett (United Kingdom) Charles Dixon	6	6	4	6

=== All comers' finals ===
Quarterfinals
(United Kingdom) Arthur Lowe (United Kingdom) Gordon Lowe	7	6	8
(United Kingdom) FR Price (United Kingdom) FF Roe	5	1	6
(United Kingdom) Alfred Beamish (United Kingdom) James Cecil Parke	7	6	6	3	6
(United Kingdom) George Hillyard (New Zealand) Anthony Wilding	9	3	3	6	4
(United Kingdom) Hope Crisp (United Kingdom) Cyril Eltringham	2	4	6	4
(Germany) Heinrich Kleinschroth (Germany) Friedrich Rahe	6	6	3	6
(United Kingdom) Gordon Cleather (United Kingdom) CS Gordon-Smith	6	5	6	6	6
(United Kingdom) Walter Crawley (United Kingdom) Augustus Hendriks	4	7	8	2	8

Semifinals
(United Kingdom) Arthur Lowe (United Kingdom) Gordon Lowe	4	5	4
(United Kingdom) Alfred Beamish (United Kingdom) James Cecil Parke	6	7	6
(Germany) Heinrich Kleinschroth (Germany) Friedrich Rahe	6	6	6
(United Kingdom) Walter Crawley (United Kingdom) Augustus Hendriks	0	1	3

Final
(United Kingdom) Alfred Beamish (United Kingdom) James Cecil Parke	3	2	4
(Germany) Heinrich Kleinschroth (Germany) Friedrich Rahe	6	6	6

=== Top half ===
==== Section 1 ====
First round

Second round
(United Kingdom) AL Bentley (United Kingdom) Alfred Ingram	5	6	9	1	6
(United States) Craig Biddle (United States) Harold Hackett	7	3	7	6	4
(United Kingdom) Arthur Lowe (United Kingdom) Gordon Lowe	6	6	7
(United Kingdom) CA Patterson (United Kingdom) Douglas Watson	2	1	5
(United Kingdom) FR Price (United Kingdom) FF Roe	8	8	6
(South Africa) Victor Gauntlett (South Africa) RF Le Sueur	6	6	4
(United Kingdom) CS Grace (Canada) Henry Mayes	5	6	6	6	9
(United Kingdom) Percival Davson (United Kingdom) Charles Simond	7	8	3	4	7

Third round
(United Kingdom) AL Bentley (United Kingdom) A Ingram	4	9	5
(United Kingdom) A Lowe (United Kingdom) G Lowe	6	11	6
(United Kingdom) FR Price (United Kingdom) FF Roe	6	2	6	6
(United Kingdom) CS Grace (Canada) H Mayes	3	6	4	3

Quarterfinals
(United Kingdom) A Lowe (United Kingdom) G Lowe	7	6	8
(United Kingdom) FR Price (United Kingdom) FF Roe	5	1	6

==== Section 2 ====
First round
(United States) Harry Guggenheim (United Kingdom) Henry Webb
(United Kingdom) George Caridia (United Kingdom) Henry Wilson-Fox	w/o
(Australia) Ernest Hicks (Germany) Oscar Kreuzer	6	6	4	6
(United Kingdom) John Ganzoni (United Kingdom) LE Milburn	4	2	6	4
(United Kingdom) Alfred Beamish (United Kingdom) James Cecil Parke	6	6	6
(South Africa) CR Leach (United Kingdom) Roderick McNair	1	1	1
(United Kingdom) LS Lee (United Kingdom) A Traill	6	6	6
(United Kingdom) Sydney Adams (United Kingdom) EW Timmis	3	2	4
(United Kingdom) AJ Jimenez (United Kingdom) R du Roveray
(United Kingdom) Stanley Franklin (United Kingdom) Vernon Kirk	w/o
(United Kingdom) George Hillyard (New Zealand) Anthony Wilding	6	6	6
(United Kingdom) AH Bowling (United Kingdom) EC Williams	2	2	1
(United Kingdom) George Stoddart (United Kingdom) Sydney Watts	7	6	10	8
(United Kingdom) EA Ess (United Kingdom) RD Nolan	5	2	12	6
(United States) Wallace Johnson (Germany) G Zinn	3	6	6	8
(United Kingdom) Reginald Gamble (United Kingdom) Maj. Roe	6	3	2	6

Second round
(United States) H Guggenheim (United Kingdom) H Webb	1	4	1
(Australia) E Hicks (Germany) O Kreuzer	6	6	6
(United Kingdom) A Beamish (United Kingdom) JC Parke	6	6	6
(United Kingdom) LS Lee (United Kingdom) A Traill	3	4	1
(United Kingdom) AJ Jimenez (United Kingdom) R du Roveray	3	1	4
(United Kingdom) G Hillyard (New Zealand) A Wilding	6	6	6
(United Kingdom) G Stoddart (United Kingdom) S Watts	3	7	4
(United States) W Johnson (Germany) G Zinn	6	9	6

Third round
(Australia) E Hicks (Germany) O Kreuzer	2	1	4
(United Kingdom) A Beamish (United Kingdom) JC Parke	6	6	6
(United Kingdom) G Hillyard (New Zealand) A Wilding	6	6	6
(United States) W Johnson (Germany) G Zinn	3	3	2

Quarterfinals
(United Kingdom) A Beamish (United Kingdom) JC Parke	7	6	6	3	6
(United Kingdom) G Hillyard (New Zealand) A Wilding	9	3	3	6	4

=== Bottom half ===
==== Section 3 ====
First round
(Australia) Alfred Jones (Australia) Horace Rice	6	6	6
(United Kingdom) Cecil Tindell-Green (Italy) Johann de Morpurgo	2	1	2
(United Kingdom) Arthur Gore (Canada) Robert Powell	6	6	6
(United Kingdom) Noel Turnbull (United Kingdom) Richard Turnbull	3	3	4
(United Kingdom) Hope Crisp (United Kingdom) Cyril Eltringham	6	6	2	9
(United Kingdom) CH Dinwiddy (United Kingdom) James Zimmermann	3	4	6	7
(United Kingdom) George Cartwright (United Kingdom) RH Hotham	8	6	6
(United Kingdom) G Luker (United Kingdom) FF Muecke	6	4	4
(Australia) Stanley Doust (United Kingdom) Theodore Mavrogordato	6	7	6
(United Kingdom) DM Field (United Kingdom) Sam O'Donnell	2	5	1
(United Kingdom) Peter Hicks (United Kingdom) JB Ward	7	6	6
(United Kingdom) F Karl (New Zealand) Frank Wilding	5	2	1
(United Kingdom) Albert Prebble (United Kingdom) George Thomas	6	5
(United Kingdom) A. Wallis Myers (Canada) Bernie Schwengers	2	2^{r}
(Germany) Heinrich Kleinschroth (Germany) Friedrich Rahe	6	9	6
(United Kingdom) NSB Kidson (Austria) Ludwig von Salm-Hoogstraeten	3	7	2

Second round
(Australia) A Jones (Australia) H Rice	6	6	4	5	3
(United Kingdom) A Gore (Canada) R Powell	4	4	6	7	6
(United Kingdom) H Crisp (United Kingdom) C Eltringham	7	6	6
(United Kingdom) G Cartwright (United Kingdom) RH Hotham	5	3	1
(Australia) S Doust (United Kingdom) T Mavrogordato	6	6	8
(United Kingdom) P Hicks (United Kingdom) JB Ward	3	2	6
(United Kingdom) A Prebble (United Kingdom) G Thomas	0	2	5
(Germany) H Kleinschroth (Germany) F Rahe	6	6	7

Third round
(United Kingdom) A Gore (Canada) R Powell	6	8	0	3	3
(United Kingdom) H Crisp (United Kingdom) C Eltringham	2	6	6	6	6
(Australia) S Doust (United Kingdom) T Mavrogordato	6	3	6	5	3
(Germany) H Kleinschroth (Germany) F Rahe	3	6	1	7	6

Quarterfinals
(United Kingdom) H Crisp (United Kingdom) C Eltringham	2	4	6	4
(Germany) H Kleinschroth (Germany) F Rahe	6	6	3	6

==== Section 4 ====
First round

Second round
(United Kingdom) Evan Gwynne-Evans (United Kingdom) GTC Watt	6	3	1	6	7
(United Kingdom) J Robinson (United Kingdom) George Greville	2	6	6	0	5
(United Kingdom) Gordon Cleather (United Kingdom) CS Gordon-Smith
(France) Max Decugis (France) Maurice Germot	w/o
(United Kingdom) Walter Crawley (United Kingdom) Augustus Hendriks	6	6	1	6
(United Kingdom) F Good (United Kingdom) WG Milburn	4	2	6	1
(United States) Samuel Hardy (United Kingdom) Kenneth Powell	4	6	3	6	6
(United Kingdom) Edmund Herring (United Kingdom) LS Hunter	6	3	6	1	2

Third round
(United Kingdom) E Gwynne-Evans (United Kingdom) GTC Watt	4	4	2
(United Kingdom) G Cleather (United Kingdom) CS Gordon-Smith	6	6	6
(United Kingdom) W Crawley (United Kingdom) AM Hendriks	6	2	6	6
(United States) S Hardy (United Kingdom) K Powell	2	6	2	4

Quarterfinals
(United Kingdom) G Cleather (United Kingdom) CS Gordon-Smith	6	5	8	2	6
(United Kingdom) W Crawley (United Kingdom) AM Hendriks	4	7	6	6	8
