= 1910 Wimbledon Championships – Men's doubles =

Men's doubles
- 1910 Wimbledon Championships

Final
- Champions: (United Kingdom) Major Ritchie (New Zealand) Anthony Wilding
- Runners-up: (United Kingdom) Herbert Roper Barrett (United Kingdom) Arthur Gore
- Score: 6–1, 6–1, 6–2

Details
- Draw: 39
- Seeds: –

Events
Singles	men	women
Doubles	men	women
- Wimbledon Championships

Major Ritchie and Anthony Wilding defeated Kenneth Powell and Robert Powell 9–7, 6–0, 6–4 in the All Comers' Final, and then defeated the reigning champions Herbert Roper Barrett and Arthur Gore 6–1, 6–1, 6–2 in the challenge round to win the gentlemen's doubles tennis title at the 1910 Wimbledon Championships.

== Draw ==
Key

- Q = Qualifier
- WC = Wild card
- LL = Lucky loser
- Alt = Alternate
- ITF = ITF entry
- PR = Protected ranking
- SR = Special ranking
- SE = Special exempt
- JE = Junior exempt
- JR = Junior Accelerator Programme entrant
- CO = College Accelerator Programme entrant
- NG = Next Gen Accelerator Program entrant
- w/o = Walkover
- r = Retired
- d = Defaulted

=== Challenge round ===
Challenge Round
(United Kingdom) Major Ritchie (New Zealand) Anthony Wilding	6	6	6
(United Kingdom) Herbert Roper Barrett (United Kingdom) Arthur Gore	1	1	2

=== All comers' finals ===
Quarterfinals
(United Kingdom) Charles Simond (United Kingdom) George Simond	4	3	4
(United Kingdom) Kenneth Powell (Canada) Robert Powell	6	6	6
(United Kingdom) William Crawley (United Kingdom) James Cecil Parke	6	3	1	6	6
(United Kingdom) Wilberforce Eaves (United States) Beals Wright	3	6	6	1	3
(United Kingdom) Gordon Cleather (United Kingdom) CS Gordon-Smith	1	7	4
(United Kingdom) Major Ritchie (New Zealand) Anthony Wilding	6	9	6
(United Kingdom) RS Barnes (United Kingdom) Albert Prebble	3	2	6	3
(Australia) Stanley Doust (Australia) Leslie Poidevin	6	6	3	6

Semifinals
(United Kingdom) Kenneth Powell (Canada) Robert Powell	6	6	6
(United Kingdom) William Crawley (United Kingdom) James Cecil Parke	3	4	3
(United Kingdom) Major Ritchie (New Zealand) Anthony Wilding	4	6	6	1	6
(Australia) Stanley Doust (Australia) Leslie Poidevin	6	3	4	6	3

Final
(United Kingdom) Kenneth Powell (Canada) Robert Powell	7	0	4
(United Kingdom) Major Ritchie (New Zealand) Anthony Wilding	9	6	6

=== Top half ===
==== Section 1 ====
First round

Second round
(United Kingdom) Augustus Hendriks (Australia) Eric Pockley	7	6	6
(United Kingdom) CH Mounsey (United Kingdom) Alfred Sterry	5	1	4
(United Kingdom) Charles Simond (United Kingdom) George Simond	6	6	4	4	6
(United Kingdom) Robert Dudley (United Kingdom) HWD Gallwey	1	1	6	6	1
(United Kingdom) Kenneth Powell (Canada) Robert Powell	6	6	6
(Netherlands) Otto Blom (India) Sirdar Nihal Singh	3	0	4
(United Kingdom) Alfred Beamish (United Kingdom) Roderick McNair	7	6	6
(United Kingdom) A. Wallis Myers (United Kingdom) George Thomas	5	4	1

Third round
(United Kingdom) A Hendriks (Australia) E Pockley	6	6	2	2	1
(United Kingdom) C Simond (United Kingdom) G Simond	3	4	6	6	6
(United Kingdom) K Powell (Canada) R Powell	6	6	4	8	6
(United Kingdom) A Beamish (United Kingdom) R McNair	2	4	6	10	0

Quarterfinals
(United Kingdom) C Simond (United Kingdom) G Simond	4	3	4
(United Kingdom) K Powell (Canada) R Powell	6	6	6

==== Section 2 ====
First round
(India) Athar Ali Fyzee (India) Hassan Ali Fyzee	3	3	7	6	7
(Denmark) P Groes-Petersen (Denmark) Leif Rovsing	6	6	5	3	5
(United Kingdom) John Ganzoni (United Kingdom) LE Milburn	6	6	6
(United Kingdom) ALH Mulcahy (South Africa) HW Sevenoaks	2	3	0
(United Kingdom) Arthur Lowe (United Kingdom) Gordon Lowe	6	5	6	11
(United Kingdom) J Robinson (United Kingdom) Percival Davson	1	7	3	9
(United Kingdom) Wilberforce Eaves (United States) Beals Wright	6	6	6
(United Kingdom) Neville Deed (United Kingdom) Anthony Prinsep	0	2	3

Second round
(United Kingdom) HC Evans (United Kingdom) Stanley Franklin	6	6	3	6
(United States) AC Bostwick (United States) A Holmes	4	4	6	1
(United Kingdom) William Crawley (United Kingdom) James Cecil Parke	6	6	9
(United Kingdom) E Morris Hall (United Kingdom) Henry Wilson-Fox	1	2	7
(India) AA Fyzee (India) HA Fyzee	3	6	6	6	6
(United Kingdom) J Ganzoni (United Kingdom) LE Milburn	6	8	1	4	3
(United Kingdom) A Lowe (United Kingdom) G Lowe	5	1	6	7
(United Kingdom) W Eaves (United States) B Wright	7	6	3	9

Third round
(United Kingdom) HC Evans (United Kingdom) S Franklin	4	6	2	3
(United Kingdom) W Crawley (United Kingdom) J Parke	6	2	6	6
(India) AA Fyzee (India) HA Fyzee	4	1	3
(United Kingdom) W Eaves (United States) B Wright	6	6	6

Quarterfinals
(United Kingdom) W Crawley (United Kingdom) JC Parke	6	3	1	6	6
(United Kingdom) W Eaves (United States) B Wright	3	6	6	1	3

=== Bottom half ===
==== Section 3 ====
First round
(United Kingdom) Gordon Cleather (United Kingdom) CS Gordon-Smith	6	6	6
(United Kingdom) RD Nolan (United Kingdom) AR Sawyer	0	4	2
(France) André Gobert (United Kingdom) Colin Wyllie	6	2	3	6	6
(United Kingdom) Frank Pearson (United Kingdom) Henry Pollard	1	6	6	3	3
(United States) George Nettleton (United Kingdom) Ernest Parton
(Germany) Otto Froitzheim (Germany) Oscar Kreuzer	w/o

Second round
(United Kingdom) G Cleather (United Kingdom) CS Gordon-Smith	8	6	6
(France) A Gobert (United Kingdom) C Wyllie	6	2	3
(United States) G Nettleton (United Kingdom) E Parton	2	3	4
(United Kingdom) Charles Dixon (United Kingdom) Theodore Mavrogordato	6	6	6
(United Kingdom) Major Ritchie (New Zealand) Anthony Wilding	6	6	6
(United Kingdom) Bernhard Pfleiderer (United Kingdom) Rudolf Pfleiderer	1	0	0
(United Kingdom) F Good (United Kingdom) Brame Hillyard	6	6	11
(Denmark) Jørgen Arenholt (Denmark) Ove Frederiksen	4	3	9

Third round
(United Kingdom) G Cleather (United Kingdom) CS Gordon-Smith	4	6	5	6	6
(United Kingdom) C Dixon (United Kingdom) T Mavrogordato	6	1	7	2	4
(United Kingdom) M Ritchie (New Zealand) A Wilding	6	6	8
(United Kingdom) F Good (United Kingdom) B Hillyard	1	0	6

Quarterfinals
(United Kingdom) G Cleather (United Kingdom) CS Gordon-Smith	1	7	4
(United Kingdom) M Ritchie (New Zealand) A Wilding	6	9	6

==== Section 4 ====
First round

Second round
(United Kingdom) TD Stoward (United Kingdom) JB Ward	6	6	5	4	6
(United Kingdom) HS Fellowes (United Kingdom) WG Milburn	3	2	7	6	4
(United Kingdom) RS Barnes (United Kingdom) Albert Prebble	6	6	6
(United Kingdom) WJ Lancaster (South Africa) Walter Tripp	1	2	3
(Australia) Stanley Doust (Australia) Les Poidevin	6	6	6
(United Kingdom) AC Holland (United Kingdom) Valentine Miley	2	1	0
(United Kingdom) Evan Gwynne-Evans (United States) Samuel Hardy	6	6	8
(United Kingdom) PC Bent (United Kingdom) A Ware	1	3	6

Third round
(United Kingdom) TD Stoward (United Kingdom) JB Ward	3	6	2	2
(United Kingdom) RS Barnes (United Kingdom) A Prebble	6	3	6	6
(Australia) S Doust (Australia) L Poidevin	6	6	6
(United Kingdom) E Gwynne-Evans (United States) S Hardy	0	3	2

Quarterfinals
(United Kingdom) RS Barnes (United Kingdom) A Prebble	3	2	6	3
(Australia) S Doust (Australia) L Poidevin	6	6	3	6
