= 1912 Wimbledon Championships – Men's doubles =

Men's doubles
- 1912 Wimbledon Championships

Final
- Champions: (United Kingdom) Herbert Roper Barrett (United Kingdom) Charles Dixon
- Runners-up: (France) Max Decugis (France) André Gobert
- Score: 3–6, 6–3, 6–4, 7–5

Details
- Draw: 34
- Seeds: –

Events
Singles	men	women
Doubles	men	women
- Wimbledon Championships

Herbert Roper Barrett and Charles Dixon defeated Alfred Beamish and James Cecil Parke 6–8, 6–4, 3–6, 6–3, 6–4 in the All Comers' Final, and then defeated the reigning champions Max Decugis and André Gobert 3–6, 6–3, 6–4, 7–5 in the challenge round to win the gentlemen's doubles tennis title at the 1912 Wimbledon Championships.

== Draw ==
Key

- Q = Qualifier
- WC = Wild card
- LL = Lucky loser
- Alt = Alternate
- ITF = ITF entry
- PR = Protected ranking
- SR = Special ranking
- SE = Special exempt
- JE = Junior exempt
- JR = Junior Accelerator Programme entrant
- CO = College Accelerator Programme entrant
- NG = Next Gen Accelerator Program entrant
- w/o = Walkover
- r = Retired
- d = Defaulted

=== Challenge round ===
Challenge Round
(United Kingdom) Herbert Roper Barrett (United Kingdom) Charles Dixon	3	6	6	7
(France) Max Decugis (France) André Gobert	6	3	4	5

=== All comers' finals ===
Quarterfinals
(Germany) Curt Bergmann (Germany) Moritz von Bissing	2	3	6	2
(United States) Samuel Hardy (Canada) Robert Powell	6	6	3	6
(United Kingdom) Alfred Beamish (United Kingdom) James Cecil Parke	6	6	3	4	7
(Australia) Stanley Doust (New Zealand) Anthony Wilding	4	4	6	6	5
(United Kingdom) Albert Prebble (United Kingdom) George Thomas	6	6	4	6
(United Kingdom) Augustus Hendriks (United Kingdom) GTC Watt	2	1	6	4
(United Kingdom) Roderick McNair (United Kingdom) AJ Ross	3	3	7	3
(United Kingdom) Herbert Roper Barrett (United Kingdom) Charles Dixon	6	6	5	6

Semifinals
(United States) Samuel Hardy (Canada) Robert Powell	5	6	4
(United Kingdom) Alfred Beamish (United Kingdom) James Cecil Parke	7	8	6
(United Kingdom) Albert Prebble (United Kingdom) George Thomas	6	1	4
(United Kingdom) Herbert Roper Barrett (United Kingdom) Charles Dixon	8	6	6

Final
(United Kingdom) Alfred Beamish (United Kingdom) James Cecil Parke	8	4	6	3	4
(United Kingdom) Herbert Roper Barrett (United Kingdom) Charles Dixon	6	6	3	6	6

=== Top half ===
==== Section 1 ====
First round

Second round
(United Kingdom) Leighton Crawford (United Kingdom) Hamilton Price
(France) Georges Gault (France) Félix Poulin	w/o
(Germany) Curt Bergmann (Germany) Moritz von Bissing	6	3	6	6
(United Kingdom) F Good (United Kingdom) WG Milburn	3	6	4	0
(United States) Samuel Hardy (Canada) Robert Powell	6	6	4	6
(United Kingdom) John Ganzoni (United Kingdom) LE Milburn	2	1	6	0
(United Kingdom) GF Anson (United Kingdom) Cedric Scott	6	6	7
(United Kingdom) J Robinson (United Kingdom) H Wilson	4	3	5

Third round
(United Kingdom) FRL Crawford (United Kingdom) H Price	5	4	2
(Germany) C Bergmann (Germany) M von Bissing	7	6	6
(United States) S Hardy (Canada) R Powell	6	6	6
(United Kingdom) GF Anson (United Kingdom) C Scott	3	4	2

Quarterfinals
(Germany) C Bergmann (Germany) M von Bissing	2	3	6	2
(United States) S Hardy (Canada) R Powell	6	6	3	6

==== Section 2 ====
First round
(United Kingdom) HF Hunt (United Kingdom) PC Hunt
(United Kingdom) EV Adams (Italy) Johann de Morpurgo	w/o

Second round
(United Kingdom) Mark Hick (United Kingdom) Neville Willford
(United Kingdom) A. Wallis Myers (South Africa) Lionel Tapscott	w/o
(United Kingdom) Alfred Beamish (United Kingdom) James Cecil Parke	6	6	6
(United Kingdom) George Coulson (United Kingdom) TD Stoward	4	1	3
(Australia) Stanley Doust (New Zealand) Anthony Wilding	6	6	6
(United Kingdom) FF Muecke (United Kingdom) Sydney Watts	0	3	1
(United Kingdom) Arthur Lowe (United Kingdom) Gordon Lowe	6	6	6
(United Kingdom) HF Hunt (United Kingdom) PC Hunt	1	2	3

Third round
(United Kingdom) M Hick (United Kingdom) N Willford	2	3	1
(United Kingdom) A Beamish (United Kingdom) JC Parke	6	6	6
(Australia) S Doust (New Zealand) A Wilding	4	7	6	5	6
(United Kingdom) A Lowe (United Kingdom) G Lowe	6	5	4	7	2

Quarterfinals
(United Kingdom) A Beamish (United Kingdom) JC Parke	6	6	3	4	7
(Australia) S Doust (New Zealand) A Wilding	4	4	6	6	5

=== Bottom half ===
==== Section 3 ====
First round
(United Kingdom) Albert Prebble (United Kingdom) George Thomas	6	6	6
(United Kingdom) R Boucher (United Kingdom) WH Warman	2	2	3

Second round
(United Kingdom) A Prebble (United Kingdom) G Thomas	6	6	7
(New Zealand) L Bonnington (United Kingdom) Charles Gouldesborough	2	2	5
(United Kingdom) Arthur Gore (United Kingdom) James Zimmermann	6	6	6
(United Kingdom) Charles Simond (United Kingdom) George Simond	2	1	2
(United Kingdom) RWF Harding (United Kingdom) Frank Pearson	2	6	7	6	8
(United Kingdom) Ambrose Dudley (United Kingdom) PR Hewlett	6	3	9	2	6
(United Kingdom) Augustus Hendriks (United Kingdom) GTC Watt	6	5	6	6
(United Kingdom) Leonard Lyle (United Kingdom) Ulysses Williams	3	7	0	0

Third round
(United Kingdom) A Prebble (United Kingdom) G Thomas	6	10	3	6
(United Kingdom) A Gore (United Kingdom) J Zimmermann	1	8	6	1
(United Kingdom) RWF Harding (United Kingdom) F Pearson	3	6	7	9
(United Kingdom) A Hendriks (United Kingdom) GTC Watt	6	0	9	11

Quarterfinals
(United Kingdom) A Prebble (United Kingdom) G Thomas	6	6	4	6
(United Kingdom) A Hendriks (United Kingdom) GTC Watt	2	1	6	4

==== Section 4 ====
First round

Second round
(United Kingdom) Roderick McNair (United Kingdom) AJ Ross	6	6	5	6
(South Africa) HW Brown (South Africa) PH Robbs	4	1	7	2
(United Kingdom) Peter Hicks (United Kingdom) Ernest Parton
(Germany) Otto Froitzheim (Germany) Friedrich Rahe	w/o
(United Kingdom) Herbert Roper Barrett (United Kingdom) Charles Dixon	6	6	6	6
(United Kingdom) Theodore Mavrogordato (United Kingdom) Major Ritchie	8	3	2	3
(United Kingdom) Hope Crisp (United Kingdom) St John Pym	6	6	6
(Australia) FE Barritt (United Kingdom) George Stoddart	3	0	1

Third round
(United Kingdom) R McNair (United Kingdom) AJ Ross	6	6	6
(United Kingdom) P Hicks (United Kingdom) E Parton	3	1	2
(United Kingdom) H Barrett (United Kingdom) C Dixon	6	6	6
(United Kingdom) H Crisp (United Kingdom) St.J Pym	2	3	4

Quarterfinals
(United Kingdom) R McNair (United Kingdom) AJ Ross	3	3	7	3
(United Kingdom) HR Barrett (United Kingdom) C Dixon	6	6	5	6
