= 1909 Wimbledon Championships – Men's doubles =

Men's doubles
- 1909 Wimbledon Championships

Final
- Champions: (United Kingdom) Herbert Roper Barrett (United Kingdom) Arthur Gore
- Runners-up: (Australia) Stanley Doust (New Zealand) Harry Parker
- Score: 6–2, 6–1, 6–4

Details
- Draw: 40
- Seeds: –

Events
Singles	men	women
Doubles	men	women
- Wimbledon Championships

Major Ritchie and Anthony Wilding were the defending champions, but Wilding did not participate. Ritchie partnered with Charles Dixon but they lost in the quarterfinals to Herbert Roper Barrett and Arthur Gore.

Barrett and Gore defeated Stanley Doust and Harry Parker 6–2, 6–1, 6–4 in the all comers' final to win the gentlemen's doubles tennis title at the 1909 Wimbledon Championships.

== Draw ==
Key

- Q = Qualifier
- WC = Wild card
- LL = Lucky loser
- Alt = Alternate
- ITF = ITF entry
- PR = Protected ranking
- SR = Special ranking
- SE = Special exempt
- JE = Junior exempt
- JR = Junior Accelerator Programme entrant
- CO = College Accelerator Programme entrant
- NG = Next Gen Accelerator Program entrant
- w/o = Walkover
- r = Retired
- d = Defaulted

=== All comers' finals ===
Quarterfinals
(Australia) Stanley Doust (New Zealand) Harry Parker	3	6	6	6
(United Kingdom) Roderick McNair (United Kingdom) George Thomas	6	2	1	3
(United Kingdom) James Cecil Parke (Germany) Friedrich Rahe	6	5	6	6
(United Kingdom) Kenneth Powell (Canada) Robert Powell	8	7	3	8
(United Kingdom) Gordon Cleather (United Kingdom) CS Gordon-Smith	6	6	6
(Belgium) William le Maire de Warzée (Belgium) Georges Watson	2	1	2
(United Kingdom) Herbert Roper Barrett (United Kingdom) Arthur Gore	6	9	6
(United Kingdom) Charles Dixon (United Kingdom) Major Ritchie	3	7	0

Semifinals
(Australia) Stanley Doust (New Zealand) Harry Parker	3	6	3	8	6
(United Kingdom) Kenneth Powell (Canada) Robert Powell	6	2	6	6	3
(United Kingdom) Gordon Cleather (United Kingdom) Charles Gordon-Smith	5	1	2
(United Kingdom) Herbert Roper Barrett (United Kingdom) Arthur Gore	7	6	6

Final
(Australia) Stanley Doust (New Zealand) Harry Parker	2	1	4
(United Kingdom) Herbert Roper Barrett (United Kingdom) Harry Parker	6	6	6

=== Top half ===
==== Section 1 ====
First round

Second round
(United Kingdom) Percival Davson (United Kingdom) Evan Gwynne-Evans	7	7	6
(United Kingdom) CH Mounsey (United Kingdom) Alfred Sterry	5	5	1
(Australia) Stanley Doust (New Zealand) Harry Parker	6	6	7
(Argentina) Stanley Knight (Argentina) Henry Knight	1	3	5
(United Kingdom) Roderick McNair (United Kingdom) George Thomas	6	6	6	9
(United Kingdom) Brame Hillyard (United Kingdom) A. Wallis Myers	2	3	8	7
(United Kingdom) RB Gurney (United Kingdom) WE Lane	6	7	6
(United Kingdom) Charles Ridding (United Kingdom) Ernest Wills	2	5	1

Third round
(United Kingdom) P Davson (United Kingdom) E Gwynne-Evans	6	1	2	6	1
(Australia) S Doust (New Zealand) H Parker	2	6	6	4	6
(United Kingdom) R McNair (United Kingdom) G Thomas	6	6	4	6
(United Kingdom) RB Gurney (United Kingdom) WE Lane	4	3	6	3

Quarterfinals
(Australia) S Doust (New Zealand) H Parker	3	6	6	6
(United Kingdom) R McNair (United Kingdom) G Thomas	6	2	1	3

==== Section 2 ====
First round
(Belgium) Louis Trasenster (Belgium) Paul de Borman	6	5	6	6
(United Kingdom) Kenneth Ingram (United Kingdom) HB Routledge	2	7	1	3
(United Kingdom) George Coulson (United Kingdom) Geoffrey Fowler	1	6	6	6
(United Kingdom) John Ganzoni (United Kingdom) LE Milburn	6	1	4	2
(United Kingdom) Kenneth Powell (Canada) Robert Powell	6	6	6
(United Kingdom) LE Gaunt (United Kingdom) C Heath	4	2	2
(United Kingdom) Clement Cazalet (United Kingdom) George Hillyard	6	6	6
(United States) DP Rhodes (Germany) Moritz von Bissing	3	2	0

Second round
(United Kingdom) James Cecil Parke (Germany) Friedrich Rahe	6	6	6
(United Kingdom) Arthur Lowe (United Kingdom) Gordon Lowe	1	0	0
(United Kingdom) HL Brutton (United Kingdom) BC Hopson	6	6	6
(United Kingdom) James Powell (United Kingdom) EW Timmis	3	2	3
(Belgium) L Trasenster (Belgium) P de Borman	6	6	6
(United Kingdom) G Coulson (United Kingdom) G Fowler	2	2	4
(United Kingdom) K Powell (Canada) R Powell	10	6	6
(United Kingdom) C Cazalet (United Kingdom) G Hillyard	8	2	4

Third round
(United Kingdom) JC Parke (Germany) F Rahe	6	7	6
(United Kingdom) HL Brutton (United Kingdom) BC Hopson	4	5	4
(Belgium) L Trasenster (Belgium) P de Borman	2	0	0
(United Kingdom) K Powell (Canada) R Powell	6	6	6

Quarterfinals
(United Kingdom) JC Parke (Germany) F Rahe	6	5	6	6
(United Kingdom) K Powell (Canada) R Powell	8	7	3	8

=== Bottom half ===
==== Section 3 ====
First round
(United Kingdom) Gordon Cleather (United Kingdom) CS Gordon-Smith	7	6	6
(Netherlands) Otto Blom (New Zealand) TR Quill	5	0	0
(United Kingdom) Theodore Mavrogordato (United Kingdom) Albert Prebble	6	3	4	6	6
(United Kingdom) Augustus Hendriks (United Kingdom) Douglas Kitching	2	6	6	2	0
(United Kingdom) Anthony Prinsep (United Kingdom) GTC Watt
(United Kingdom) Reginald Doherty (United Kingdom) Wilberforce Eaves	w/o
(United Kingdom) RH Hotham (United States) DP Rhodes	6	1	4	6	7
(United Kingdom) HS Fellowes (United Kingdom) Arnold Herschell	2	6	6	2	5

Second round
(United Kingdom) G Cleather (United Kingdom) CS Gordon-Smith	6	3	6	3	6
(United Kingdom) T Mavrogordato (United Kingdom) A Prebble	3	6	4	6	3
(United Kingdom) A Prinsep (United Kingdom) GTC Watt	w/o
(United Kingdom) RH Hotham (United States) DP Rhodes
(Belgium) William le Maire de Warzée (Belgium) Georges Watson	6	6	1
(United Kingdom) Henry Pollard (United Kingdom) Alfred Taylor	5	3	5^{r}
(United Kingdom) Robert Dudley (United Kingdom) Fritz Goldberg
(United Kingdom) George Allen (United Kingdom) Hamilton Price	w/o

Third round
(United Kingdom) G Cleather (United Kingdom) CS Gordon-Smith	6	6	2	6
(United Kingdom) RH Hotham (United States) DP Rhodes	4	0	6	3
(Belgium) W le Maire de Warzée (Belgium) G Watson	6	8	6
(United Kingdom) R Dudley (United Kingdom) F Goldberg	4	6	3

Quarterfinals
(United Kingdom) G Cleather (United Kingdom) CS Gordon-Smith	6	6	6
(Belgium) W le Maire de Warzée (Belgium) G Watson	2	1	2

==== Section 4 ====
First round

Second round
(United Kingdom) C Ambrose (United Kingdom) AW Andrews	5	6	3	6	6
(United Kingdom) RD Nolan (United Kingdom) Sydney Watts	7	4	6	4	3
(United Kingdom) Herbert Roper Barrett (United Kingdom) Arthur Gore	6	6	6
(United Kingdom) Alfred Beamish (United Kingdom) JB Ward	2	3	3
(United Kingdom) Lionel Escombe (Australia) Les Poidevin
(United Kingdom) Charles Simond (United Kingdom) George Simond	w/o
(United Kingdom) Charles Dixon (United Kingdom) M Ritchie	6	6	6
(France) RF Quennessen (India) Sirdar Nihal Singh	1	1	3

Third round
(United Kingdom) C Ambrose (United Kingdom) AW Andrews	w/o
(United Kingdom) HR Barrett (United Kingdom) A Gore
(United Kingdom) L Escombe (Australia) L Poidevin	4	3	5
(United Kingdom) C Dixon (United Kingdom) M Ritchie	6	6	7

Quarterfinals
(United Kingdom) HR Barrett (United Kingdom) A Gore	6	9	6
(United Kingdom) C Dixon (United Kingdom) M Ritchie	3	7	0
