= 1911 Wimbledon Championships – Men's doubles =

Men's doubles
- 1911 Wimbledon Championships

Final
- Champions: (France) Max Decugis (France) André Gobert
- Runners-up: (United Kingdom) Major Ritchie (New Zealand) Anthony Wilding
- Score: 9–7, 5–7, 6–3, 2–6, 6–2

Details
- Draw: 38
- Seeds: –

Events
Singles	men	women
Doubles	men	women
- Wimbledon Championships

Max Decugis and André Gobert defeated Samuel Hardy and James Cecil Parke 6–2, 6–1, 6–2 in the All Comers' Final, and then defeated the reigning champions Major Ritchie and Anthony Wilding 9–7, 5–7, 6–3, 2–6, 6–2 in the challenge round to win the gentlemen's doubles tennis title at the 1911 Wimbledon Championships.

== Draw ==
Key

- Q = Qualifier
- WC = Wild card
- LL = Lucky loser
- Alt = Alternate
- ITF = ITF entry
- PR = Protected ranking
- SR = Special ranking
- SE = Special exempt
- JE = Junior exempt
- JR = Junior Accelerator Programme entrant
- CO = College Accelerator Programme entrant
- NG = Next Gen Accelerator Program entrant
- w/o = Walkover
- r = Retired
- d = Defaulted

=== Challenge round ===
Challenge Round
(France) Max Decugis (France) André Gobert	9	5	6	2	6
(United Kingdom) Major Ritchie (New Zealand) Anthony Wilding	7	7	3	6	2

=== All comers' finals ===
Quarterfinals
(United Kingdom) John Ganzoni (United Kingdom) LE Milburn	3	2	3
(France) Max Decugis (France) André Gobert	6	6	6
(Australia) Stanley Doust (Australia) Eric Pockley	2	9	7	6
(United Kingdom) Kenneth Powell (Canada) Robert Powell	6	7	5	3
(United Kingdom) Herbert Roper Barrett (United Kingdom) Arthur Gore	6	6	7
(United Kingdom) Arthur Lowe (United Kingdom) Gordon Lowe	2	3	2
(United States) Samuel Hardy (United Kingdom) James Cecil Parke	6	6	6
(United Kingdom) RWF Harding (United Kingdom) Frank Pearson	2	1	4

Semifinals
(France) Max Decugis (France) André Gobert	4	4	6	7	6
(Australia) Stanley Doust (Australia) Eric Pockley	6	6	3	5	4
(United Kingdom) Herbert Roper Barrett (United Kingdom) Arthur Gore	6	3	9	0^{r}
(United States) Samuel Hardy (United Kingdom) James Cecil Parke	3	6	7	0

Final
(France) Max Decugis (France) André Gobert	6	6	6
(United States) Samuel Hardy (United Kingdom) James Cecil Parke	2	1	2

=== Top half ===
==== Section 1 ====
First round

Second round
(United Kingdom) John Ganzoni (United Kingdom) LE Milburn	6	7	6
(United Kingdom) F Good (United Kingdom) CF Ryder	1	5	3
(United Kingdom) Peter Hicks (United Kingdom) AR Sawyer	2	6	7	3	6
(United Kingdom) HE Evers (United Kingdom) WJ Lancaster	6	2	5	6	2
(France) Max Decugis (France) André Gobert	6	6	7
(South Africa) Frank Cochran (United Kingdom) PC Hunt	1	2	5
(Germany) Heinrich Kleinschroth (Germany) Friedrich Rahe	6	4	6	6
(United Kingdom) CH Halcomb (United Kingdom) FF Muecke	4	6	4	3

Third round
(United Kingdom) J Ganzoni (United Kingdom) LE Milburn	4	8	6	6	6
(United Kingdom) P Hicks (United Kingdom) AR Sawyer	6	10	3	0	2
(France) M Decugis (France) A Gobert	12	7	6
(Germany) H Kleinschroth (Germany) F Rahe	10	5	3

Quarterfinals
(United Kingdom) J Ganzoni (United Kingdom) LE Milburn	3	2	3
(France) M Decugis (France) A Gobert	6	6	6

==== Section 2 ====
First round
(United Kingdom) Ambrose Dudley (United Kingdom) Robert Dudley	6	3	6	6
(India) Lewis Deane (United Kingdom) Reginald Gamble	4	6	4	4
(United Kingdom) NW Kirkby (United Kingdom) AF Stephen
(France) Roger Anceau (Italy) Gino de Martino	w/o
(United Kingdom) Gordon Cleather (United Kingdom) CS Gordon-Smith	6	8	6
(United Kingdom) H Wilson (United Kingdom) E Morris Hall	2	6	2

Second round
(United Kingdom) Roderick McNair (United Kingdom) George Thomas	6	5	6	10
(United Kingdom) RS Barnes (United Kingdom) TD Stoward	4	7	3	8
(Australia) Stanley Doust (Australia) Eric Pockley	8	6	6
(United Kingdom) Percival Davson (United Kingdom) George Simond	6	1	1
(United Kingdom) Kenneth Powell (Canada) Robert Powell	6	6	8	6
(United Kingdom) A Dudley (United Kingdom) R Dudley	4	4	10	2
(United Kingdom) NW Kirkby (United Kingdom) AF Stephen	8	6	6	6
(United Kingdom) G Cleather (United Kingdom) CS Gordon-Smith	10	4	2	1

Third round
(United Kingdom) R McNair (United Kingdom) G Thomas	1	5	5
(Australia) S Doust (Australia) E Pockley	6	7	7
(United Kingdom) K Powell (Canada) R Powell	6	7	6
(United Kingdom) G Cleather (United Kingdom) CS Gordon-Smith	4	5	4

Quarterfinals
(Australia) S Doust (Australia) E Pockley	2	9	7	6
(United Kingdom) K Powell (Canada) R Powell	6	7	5	3

=== Bottom half ===
==== Section 3 ====
First round
(United Kingdom) Alfred Beamish (United Kingdom) Theodore Mavrogordato	6	6	6
(United Kingdom) SM Edwards (United Kingdom) AJ Jimenez	2	2	0
(Australia) Alfred Dunlop (Australia) Rodney Heath	6	6	9
(United Kingdom) Hope Crisp (United Kingdom) EW Timmis	1	1	7
(United Kingdom) Herbert Roper Barrett (United Kingdom) Arthur Gore	6	6	6
(United Kingdom) Charles Simond (United Kingdom) JB Ward	2	3	3

Second round
(United Kingdom) A Beamish (United Kingdom) T Mavrogordato	1	2	4
(Australia) A Dunlop (Australia) R Heath	6	6	6
(United Kingdom) HR Barrett (United Kingdom) A Gore	6	6	6
(United Kingdom) CS Grace (United Kingdom) DH Rutherglen	2	2	2
(United Kingdom) CH Mounsey (United Kingdom) Alfred Sterry	6	4	2	6	6
(United Kingdom) Augustus Hendriks (New Zealand) TR Quill	3	6	6	2	1
(United Kingdom) Arthur Lowe (United Kingdom) Gordon Lowe
(United Kingdom) Clement Cazalet (United Kingdom) Wilberforce Eaves	w/o

Third round
(Australia) A Dunlop (Australia) R Heath	2	4	5
(United Kingdom) HR Barrett (United Kingdom) A Gore	6	6	7
(United Kingdom) CH Mounsey (United Kingdom) A Sterry	3	1	2
(United Kingdom) A Lowe (United Kingdom) G Lowe	6	6	6

Quarterfinals
(United Kingdom) HR Barrett (United Kingdom) A Gore	6	6	7
(United Kingdom) A Lowe (United Kingdom) G Lowe	2	3	2

==== Section 4 ====
First round

Second round
(United Kingdom) Charles Dixon (United Kingdom) Albert Prebble	6	6	6
(United States) WS Cushing (United Kingdom) ASG Reid	2	2	3
(United States) Samuel Hardy (United Kingdom) James Cecil Parke	6	7	6
(United Kingdom) Harold Bache (United Kingdom) St John Pym	2	5	4
(United Kingdom) RWF Harding (United Kingdom) F Pearson	6	7	6
(Australia) Henry Marsh (United Kingdom) George Mewburn	1	5	3
(United Kingdom) Stanley Franklin (United Kingdom) MRL White	2	7	6	2	6
(United Kingdom) HC Evans (United Kingdom) EJ Harrison	6	5	2	6	4

Third round
(United Kingdom) C Dixon (United Kingdom) A Prebble	4	8	5
(United States) S Hardy (United Kingdom) JC Parke	6	10	7
(United Kingdom) RWF Harding (United Kingdom) F Pearson	6	6	4	5	6
(United Kingdom) S Franklin (United Kingdom) MRL White	4	0	6	7	4

Quarterfinals
(United States) S Hardy (United Kingdom) JC Parke	6	6	6
(United Kingdom) RWF Harding (United Kingdom) F Pearson	2	1	4
