= 1911 Wimbledon Championships – Men's singles =

Men's singles
- 1911 Wimbledon Championships

Final
- Champion: (New Zealand) Anthony Wilding
- Runner-up: (United Kingdom) Herbert Roper Barrett
- Score: 6–4, 4–6, 2–6, 6–2 retired

Details
- Draw: 104
- Seeds: –

Events
| Singles | men | women |
| Doubles | men | women |
- Wimbledon Championships

Herbert Roper Barrett defeated Charles Dixon 5–7, 4–6, 6–4, 6–3, 6–1 in the All Comers' Final, but the reigning champion Anthony Wilding defeated Roper Barrett 6–4, 4–6, 2–6, 6–2 retired in the challenge round to win the gentlemen's singles tennis title at the 1911 Wimbledon Championships.

== Draw ==
Key

- Q = Qualifier
- WC = Wild card
- LL = Lucky loser
- Alt = Alternate
- ITF = ITF entry
- PR = Protected ranking
- SR = Special ranking
- SE = Special exempt
- JE = Junior exempt
- JR = Junior Accelerator Programme entrant
- CO = College Accelerator Programme entrant
- NG = Next Gen Accelerator Program entrant
- w/o = Walkover
- r = Retired
- d = Defaulted

=== Challenge round ===
| Challenge Round |
| (New Zealand) Anthony Wilding | 6 | 4 | 2 | 6 | 0 |
| (United Kingdom) Herbert Roper Barrett | 4 | 6 | 6 | 2 | 0^{r} |

=== All comers' finals ===
Quarterfinals
(Australia) Rodney Heath | 8 | 4 | 5
(France) Max Decugis | 10 | 6 | 7
(United Kingdom) Charles Dixon | 6 | 5 | 8 | 6
(United Kingdom) George Thomas | 4 | 7 | 6 | 3
(United Kingdom) Alfred Beamish | 1 | 6 | 4 | 3
(United Kingdom) Herbert Roper Barrett | 6 | 1 | 6 | 6
(Germany) Friedrich Rahe | 7 | 3 | 2 | 7
(United Kingdom) Gordon Lowe | 5 | 6 | 6 | 9

Semifinals
(France) Max Decugis | 2 | 7 | 2 | 3
(United Kingdom) Charles Dixon | 6 | 5 | 6 | 6
(United Kingdom) Herbert Roper Barrett | 6 | 6 | 6
(United Kingdom) Gordon Lowe | 2 | 3 | 2

Final
(United Kingdom) Charles Dixon | 7 | 6 | 4 | 3 | 1
(United Kingdom) Herbert Roper Barrett | 5 | 4 | 6 | 6 | 6

=== Top half ===
==== Section 1 ====
First round

Second round
(United Kingdom) Alfred Hunter | 6 | 6 | 6
(United Kingdom) FW Last | 1 | 2 | 4
(Australia) Rodney Heath
(United Kingdom) ND Malcolm | w/o
(South Africa) Frank Cochran | 6 | 7 | 6 | 6
(United Kingdom) Harold Bache | 3 | 9 | 3 | 3
(United Kingdom) TG Heldring
(France) Roger Anceau | w/o

Third round
(United Kingdom) A Hunter | 0 | 2 | 1
(Australia) R Heath | 6 | 6 | 6
(South Africa) F Cochran | 6 | 6 | 6
(United Kingdom) TG Heldring | 3 | 2 | 3

Fourth round
(Australia) R Heath | 6 | 6 | 6
(South Africa) F Cochran | 1 | 2 | 2

==== Section 2 ====
First round
(Australia) Stanley Doust | 6 | 6 | 6
(United Kingdom) SM Edwards | 2 | 1 | 2
(United Kingdom) Charles Pritchett | 6 | 8 | 6
(United Kingdom) RWF Harding | 2 | 6 | 4
(United Kingdom) Arthur Gore | 6 | 6 | 6
A Popp | 0 | 0 | 0
(France) André Gobert | 6 | 6 | 7
(United States) WS Cushing | 2 | 0 | 5

Second round
(United Kingdom) AL Bentley
(United Kingdom) GR Johnson | w/o
(France) Max Decugis | 7 | 6 | 6 | 6
(Denmark) Erik Larsen | 9 | 3 | 3 | 0
(Australia) S Doust | 3 | 6 | 6 | 3 | 4
(United Kingdom) C Pritchett | 6 | 2 | 2 | 6 | 6
(United Kingdom) A Gore | 6 | 6 | 6
(France) A Gobert | 3 | 3 | 2

Third round
(United Kingdom) AL Bentley | 2 | 3 | 1
(France) M Decugis | 6 | 6 | 6
(United Kingdom) C Pritchett | 1 | 6 | 3
(United Kingdom) A Gore | 6 | 8 | 6

Fourth round
(France) M Decugis | 2 | 6 | 6 | 8
(United Kingdom) A Gore | 6 | 4 | 4 | 6

The nationality of A Popp is unknown.

==== Section 3 ====
First round
(United Kingdom) Charles Dixon | 6 | 6 | 3 | 6
(United Kingdom) LE Milburn | 1 | 3 | 6 | 2
(United Kingdom) CS Grace
(United Kingdom) AH Green | w/o
(New Zealand) TR Quill
(France) Georges Gault | w/o
(United Kingdom) CJ Adams
(Netherlands) Christiaan van Lennep | w/o
(United Kingdom) Ernest Parton | 7 | 6 | 5 | 6 | 6
(United Kingdom) CF Ryder | 9 | 3 | 7 | 3 | 4
(Australia) Eric Pockley | 6 | 6 | 6
(United Kingdom) HWD Gallwey | 2 | 2 | 1
(United Kingdom) Percival Davson | 2 | 6 | 6 | 9
(Australia) Alfred Dunlop | 6 | 4 | 3 | 7
(United Kingdom) Major Ritchie | 6 | 6 | 6
(United Kingdom) JR Brinkley | 2 | 0 | 0

Second round
(United Kingdom) C Dixon | 6 | 6 | 6
(United Kingdom) CS Grace | 1 | 2 | 4
(Australia) TR Quill | 6 | 6 | 6
(United Kingdom) CJ Adams | 3 | 1 | 0
(United Kingdom) E Parton | 2 | 3 | 2
(Australia) E Pockley | 6 | 6 | 6
(United Kingdom) P Davson | 2 | 6 | 1 | 4
(United Kingdom) M Ritchie | 6 | 3 | 6 | 6

Third round
(United Kingdom) C Dixon | 8 | 6 | 6
(New Zealand) TR Quill | 6 | 4 | 3
(Australia) E Pockley | 1 | 3 | 5
(United Kingdom) M Ritchie | 6 | 6 | 7

Fourth round
(United Kingdom) C Dixon | 8 | 6 | 6 | 6
(United Kingdom) M Ritchie | 6 | 4 | 8 | 4

==== Section 4 ====
First round
(United Kingdom) ASG Reid | 6 | 7 | 6
(United Kingdom) James Powell | 2 | 5 | 3
(Australia) Henry Marsh | 6 | 6 | 5 | 5 | 6
(United Kingdom) George Stoddart | 4 | 4 | 7 | 7 | 3
(United Kingdom) Stanley Franklin | 6 | 6 | 6
(United Kingdom) R Otter | 1 | 0 | 3
(United Kingdom) Albert Prebble | 6 | 6 | 6
(United Kingdom) AJ Jiminez | 3 | 0 | 2
(United Kingdom) EW Timmis | 9 | 4 | 6 | 6
(United Kingdom) Percy Tabbush | 7 | 6 | 3 | 4
(United Kingdom) George Thomas | 6 | 8 | 6
(United Kingdom) Cedric Scott | 3 | 6 | 4
(United Kingdom) KennethPowell | 6 | 6 | 6
(United Kingdom) George Caridia | 0 | 1 | 2
(United Kingdom) Wilberforce Eaves | 7 | 6 | 6
(United Kingdom) DH Rutherglen | 5 | 1 | 4

Second round
(United Kingdom) ASG Reid | 3 | 4 | 5
(Australia) H Marsh | 6 | 6 | 7
(United Kingdom) S Franklin | 0 | 3 | 7 | 6 | 6
(United Kingdom) A Prebble | 6 | 6 | 5 | 0 | 3
(United Kingdom) EW Timmis | 7 | 0 | 2
(United Kingdom) G Thomas | 9 | 6 | 6
(United Kingdom) K Powell | 10 | 6 | 0
(United Kingdom) W Eaves | 8 | 3 | 0^{r}

Third round
(Australia) H Marsh | 6 | 6 | 4
(United Kingdom) S Franklin | 4 | 4 | 0^{r}
(United Kingdom) G Thomas | 11 | 5 | 6 | 6
(United Kingdom) K Powell | 9 | 7 | 2 | 3

Fourth round
(Australia) H Marsh | 7 | 6 | 7 | 1 | 3
(United Kingdom) G Thomas | 9 | 4 | 5 | 6 | 6

=== Bottom half ===
==== Section 5 ====
First round
(United Kingdom) Frank Jarvis
(United Kingdom) C Brooke Leggatt | w/o
(United Kingdom) C Moore | 3 | 7 | 7 | 6
(United Kingdom) Hope Crisp | 6 | 5 | 5 | 4
(United Kingdom) Alfred Beamish | 6 | 6 | 6
(United Kingdom) WJ Lancaster | 3 | 1 | 3
(United Kingdom) Geoffrey Roberts
(United Kingdom) Shirley Dillon | w/o
(United Kingdom) Robert Dudley | 2 | 0 | 6 | 6 | 7
(United Kingdom) AF Stephen | 6 | 6 | 4 | 2 | 5
(United States) DP Rhodes
(United Kingdom) H Galsworthy | w/o
(United Kingdom) Roderick McNair | 5 | 6 | 6 | 6
(United Kingdom) F Good | 7 | 2 | 1 | 2
(United Kingdom) FH Bryant | 6 | 6 | 3 | 6
(United Kingdom) Gordon Cleather | 4 | 3 | 6 | 3

Second round
(United Kingdom) F Jarvis | 6 | 3 | 1 | 6 | 2
(United Kingdom) C Moore | 3 | 6 | 6 | 2 | 6
(United Kingdom) A Beamish | 6 | 6 | 3 | 6
(United Kingdom) G Roberts | 3 | 2 | 6 | 3
(United Kingdom) R Dudley
(United States) D Rhodes | w/o
(United Kingdom) R McNair | 6 | 6 | 6
(United Kingdom) FH Bryant | 2 | 2 | 0

Third round
(United Kingdom) C Moore | 4 | 2 | 1
(United Kingdom) A Beamish | 6 | 6 | 6
(United Kingdom) R Dudley | 1 | 7 | 7 | 9 | 2
(United Kingdom) R McNair | 6 | 9 | 5 | 7 | 6

Fourth round
(United Kingdom) A Beamish | 6 | 6 | 7
(United Kingdom) R McNair | 1 | 2 | 5

==== Section 6 ====
First round
(United Kingdom) CS Gordon-Smith | 10 | 7 | 6
(United Kingdom) JB Ward | 8 | 5 | 4
(United Kingdom) MRL White | 6 | 6 | 6
(United Kingdom) S Hawksworth | 0 | 0 | 1
(United Kingdom) Theodore Mavrogordato | 6 | 4 | 7 | 3 | 6
(Germany) Heinrich Kleinschroth | 3 | 6 | 5 | 6 | 3
(United Kingdom) RS Barnes | 6 | 6 | 6
(United Kingdom) E Morris Hall | 0 | 3 | 4
(United Kingdom) Herbert Roper Barrett | 6 | 6 | 6
(United Kingdom) James Cecil Parke | 3 | 1 | 4
(United Kingdom) RH Hotham | 8 | 6 | 8
(India) Lewis Deane | 6 | 1 | 6
(United Kingdom) AR Sawyer | 6 | 6 | 6
(United Kingdom) Reginald Gamble | 1 | 3 | 4
(United Kingdom) Peter Hicks | 6 | 3 | 6 | 6
(United Kingdom) FB Clogg | 1 | 6 | 3 | 2

Second round
(United Kingdom) CS Gordon-Smith | 6 | 7 | 2 | 6
(United Kingdom) MRL White | 4 | 5 | 6 | 2
(United Kingdom) T Mavrogordato | 7 | 2 | 6 | 9
(United Kingdom) RS Barnes | 5 | 6 | 3 | 7
(United Kingdom) HR Barrett | 6 | 6 | 6
(United Kingdom) RH Hotham | 3 | 2 | 0
(United Kingdom) AR Sawyer | 6 | 4 | 6 | 6
(United Kingdom) P Hicks | 1 | 6 | 1 | 3

Third round
(United Kingdom) CS Gordon-Smith | 3 | 4 | 5
(United Kingdom) T Mavrogordato | 6 | 6 | 7
(United Kingdom) HR Barrett | 6 | 6 | 6
(United Kingdom) AR Sawyer | 0 | 3 | 1

Fourth round
(United Kingdom) T Mavrogordato | 3 | 6 | 6 | 6
(United Kingdom) HR Barrett | 6 | 3 | 8 | 8

==== Section 7 ====
First round
(Canada) Robert Powell | 6 | 6 | 5 | 6
(United Kingdom) H Wilson | 2 | 1 | 7 | 1
(Germany) Friedrich Rahe | 6 | 6 | 6
(United Kingdom) RH Somers Lewis | 2 | 1 | 1
(United Kingdom) TD Stoward | 6 | 6 | 6
(United Kingdom) EJ Sampson | 2 | 4 | 2
(United Kingdom) Augustus Hendriks | 3 | 6 | 6 | 8
(Italy) Gino de Martino | 6 | 3 | 4 | 6

Second round
(Canada) R Powell | 4 | 6 | 6 | 4 | 5
(Germany) F Rahe | 6 | 4 | 4 | 6 | 7
(United Kingdom) TD Stoward | 2 | 6 | 6 | 6
(United Kingdom) A Hendriks | 6 | 1 | 2 | 3
(Belgium) Paul de Borman | 6 | 6 | 6
(United Kingdom) WP Barringer | 0 | 0 | 1
(United Kingdom) Sydney Watts | 6 | 6 | 3 | 6
(United Kingdom) EA Ess | 2 | 1 | 6 | 3

Third round
(Germany) F Rahe | 7 | 3 | 3 | 6 | 9
(United Kingdom) TD Stoward | 5 | 6 | 6 | 1 | 7
(Belgium) P de Borman | 6 | 6 | 6
(United Kingdom) S Watts | 2 | 2 | 3

Fourth round
(Germany) F Rahe | 6 | 6 | 6
(Belgium) P de Borman | 3 | 2 | 4

==== Section 8 ====
First round

Second round
(United Kingdom) Charles Gouldesborough | 6 | 6 | 5 | 1 | 6
(United Kingdom) WS Slade | 4 | 4 | 7 | 6 | 1
(United Kingdom) Gordon Lowe | 5 | 7 | 6 | 0
(United Kingdom) Arthur Lowe | 7 | 5 | 4 | 0^{r}
(United Kingdom) FC Budd | 2 | 6 | 5
(United Kingdom) George Allen | 6 | 8 | 7
(United Kingdom) Thomas Haydon | 3 | 7 | 6 | 6
(United States) Craig Biddle | 6 | 5 | 2 | 2

Third round
(United Kingdom) C Gouldesborough | 2 | 0 | 3
(United Kingdom) G Lowe | 6 | 6 | 6
(United Kingdom) G Allen | 3 | 5 | 0
(United Kingdom) T Haydon | 6 | 7 | 6

Fourth round
(United Kingdom) G Lowe | 6 | 6 | 4 | 6
(United Kingdom) T Haydon | 2 | 3 | 6 | 2

| Preceded by 1910 Australasian Championships – Men's singles | Grand Slam men's singles | Succeeded by 1911 U.S. National Championships – Men's singles |
