= 1912 Wimbledon Championships – Men's singles =

Tennis tournament held in 1912

Men's singles
- 1912 Wimbledon Championships

Final
- Champion: (New Zealand) Anthony Wilding
- Runner-up: (United Kingdom) Arthur Gore
- Score: 6–4, 6–4, 4–6, 6–4

Details
- Draw: 81
- Seeds: –

Events
Singles	men	women
Doubles	men	women
- Wimbledon Championships

Arthur Gore defeated André Gobert 9–7, 2–6, 7–5, 6–1 in the All Comers' Final, but the reigning champion Anthony Wilding defeated Gore 6–4, 6–4, 4–6, 6–4 in the challenge round to win the gentlemen's singles tennis title at the 1912 Wimbledon Championships. Gore’s run to the challenge round makes him the oldest male Grand Slam finalist in history.

== Draw ==
Key

- Q = Qualifier
- WC = Wild card
- LL = Lucky loser
- Alt = Alternate
- ITF = ITF entry
- PR = Protected ranking
- SR = Special ranking
- SE = Special exempt
- JE = Junior exempt
- JR = Junior Accelerator Programme entrant
- CO = College Accelerator Programme entrant
- NG = Next Gen Accelerator Program entrant
- w/o = Walkover
- r = Retired
- d = Defaulted

=== Challenge round ===
Challenge Round
(United Kingdom) Arthur Gore	4	4	6	4
(New Zealand) Anthony Wilding	6	6	4	6

=== All comers' finals ===
Quarterfinals
(Germany) Friedrich Rahe	1	2	5
(France) André Gobert	6	6	7
(France) Max Decugis	6	7	4	6
(United Kingdom) Herbert Roper Barrett	3	5	6	4
(United Kingdom) Alfred Beamish	6	6	6
(United Kingdom) James Zimmermann	4	3	1
(United Kingdom) Arthur Gore	6	6	4	6
(Canada) Robert Powell	3	2	6	2

Semifinals
(France) André Gobert	6	6	1	4	6
(France) Max Decugis	3	3	6	6	4
(United Kingdom) Alfred Beamish	2	6	9	4
(United Kingdom) Arthur Gore	6	0	11	6

Final
(France) André Gobert	7	6	5	1
(United Kingdom) Arthur Gore	9	2	7	6

=== Top half ===
==== Section 1 ====
First round

Second round
(United Kingdom) Charles Gouldesborough	6	8	6
(United Kingdom) GTC Watt	3	6	3
(United Kingdom) Theodore Mavrogordato	6	6	6
(United Kingdom) GF Anson	3	2	3
(Germany) Friedrich Rahe	7	6	8	6
(United Kingdom) Augustus Hendriks	9	3	6	3
(United Kingdom) WG Milburn	6	6	7	6
(United Kingdom) Alfred Hunter	4	8	5	4

Third round
(United Kingdom) C Gouldesborough	4	1	3
(United Kingdom) T Mavrogordato	6	6	6
(Germany) F Rahe	6	6	6
(United Kingdom) WG Milburn	2	2	1

Fourth round
(United Kingdom) T Mavrogordato	4	3	8	4
(Germany) F Rahe	6	6	6	6

==== Section 2 ====
First round

Second round
(France) André Gobert	6	6	6
(United Kingdom) Ulysses Williams	0	4	0
(United Kingdom) James Cecil Parke	6	6	2	6
(United Kingdom) John Rendall	3	4	6	2
(United Kingdom) PR Hewlett
(United Kingdom) EJ Sampson
(United Kingdom) Albert Prebble
(United Kingdom) J Spalding	w/o

Third round
(France) A Gobert	6	6	6
(United Kingdom) JC Parke	3	4	4
(United Kingdom) PR Hewlett	0	0	2
(United Kingdom) A Prebble	6	6	6

Fourth round
(France) A Gobert	6	6	6
(United Kingdom) A Prebble	1	4	4

==== Section 3 ====
First round
(Australia) Stanley Doust	6	6	8
(United Kingdom) F Good	3	2	6

Second round
(France) Max Decugis	6	6	6
(United Kingdom) George Thomas	2	0	3
(United Kingdom) AJ Ross
(United Kingdom) AW Maloney	w/o
(Germany) Otto Froitzheim
(France) Georges Gault	w/o
(Australia) FE Barritt	1	0	1
(Australia) S Doust	6	6	6

Third round
(France) M Decugis	6	6	7
(United Kingdom) AJ Ross	0	1	5
(Germany) O Froitzheim	4	5	3
(Australia) S Doust	6	7	6

Fourth round
(France) M Decugis	6	6	7
(Australia) S Doust	4	3	5

==== Section 4 ====
First round
(United Kingdom) Leighton Crawford	5	6	6	6
(United Kingdom) Ceorge Cartwright	7	0	4	3
(United Kingdom) Major Ritchie	6	6	6
(United Kingdom) George Stoddart	0	4	1
(United Kingdom) Alfred Ingram
(United Kingdom) HF Hunt	w/o
(United Kingdom) Charles Dixon	6	6	6
(United Kingdom) Fritz Goldberg	4	1	3
(United Kingdom) Herbert Roper Barrett	6	6	7
(United Kingdom) Arthur Zorab	1	2	5
(United Kingdom) Ambrose Dudley	6	9	6
(United Kingdom) Amphlett Davis	2	7	1
(United Kingdom) Cedric Scott	6	6	6
(United Kingdom) Neville Willford	3	4	3
(South Africa) PH Robbs	6	6	6
(South Africa) HW Brown	3	4	2

Second round
(United Kingdom) FRL Crawford	1	2	3
(United Kingdom) M Ritchie	6	6	6
(United Kingdom) A Ingram	3	3	3
(United Kingdom) C Dixon	6	6	6
(United Kingdom) HR Barrett	6	6	6
(United Kingdom) A Dudley	2	1	0
(United Kingdom) C Scott	1	4	3
(South Africa) PH Robbs	6	6	6

Third round
(United Kingdom) M Ritchie	6	7	6
(United Kingdom) C Dixon	4	5	0
(United Kingdom) HR Barrett	6	6	8
(South Africa) PH Robbs	2	3	6

Fourth round
(United Kingdom) M Ritchie	6	6	2	6	4
(United Kingdom) HR Barrett	8	3	6	3	6

=== Bottom half ===
==== Section 5 ====
First round
(United Kingdom) Gordon Lowe	6	6	6
(United Kingdom) Sydney Watts	4	0	2
(Germany) Moritz von Bissing	6	6	6
(United Kingdom) EW Timmis	4	4	3
(United Kingdom) AL Bentley	6	6	6
(Poland) ST de Jakimowicz	1	0	3
(United Kingdom) Arthur Lowe	9	6	5	1	6
(Denmark) Erik Larsen	7	4	7	6	2
(United Kingdom) Roderick McNair
(France) Maurice Germot	w/o
(United Kingdom) Mark Hick	6	6	6
(United Kingdom) WP Haviland	2	1	2
(United Kingdom) Alfred Beamish	9	6	6	2
(United Kingdom) A. Wallis Myers	11	4	1	0^{r}
(United Kingdom) R Trebor	4	3	6	6	6
(United Kingdom) Leonard Lyle	6	6	2	3	3

Second round
(United Kingdom) G Lowe	6	6	6
(Germany) M von Bissing	3	0	3
(United Kingdom) AL Bentley	0	3	0
(United Kingdom) A Lowe	6	6	6
(United Kingdom) R McNair	1	4	4
(United Kingdom) M Hick	6	6	6
(United Kingdom) A Beamish	6	6	6
(United Kingdom) R Trebor	1	0	3

Third round
(United Kingdom) G Lowe	2	6	6	6
(United Kingdom) A Lowe	6	2	1	3
(United Kingdom) M Hick	2	8	2	0
(United Kingdom) A Beamish	6	6	6	6

Fourth round
(United Kingdom) G Lowe	9	1	2
(United Kingdom) A Beamish	11	6	6

==== Section 6 ====
First round

Second round
(United Kingdom) TD Stoward	6	6	6
(United Kingdom) JH Harris	2	1	1
(United Kingdom) James Zimmermann	4	6	6	6
(United Kingdom) H Wilson	6	0	2	3
(United Kingdom) CJ Adams
(France) Félix Poulin	w/o
(United Kingdom) Peter Hicks	7	6	6
(United Kingdom) WH Warman	5	3	4

Third round
(United Kingdom) TD Stoward	1	6	3	2
(United Kingdom) J Zimmermann	6	4	6	6
(United Kingdom) CJ Adams	0	1	2
(United Kingdom) P Hicks	6	6	6

Fourth round
(United Kingdom) J Zimmermann	3	6	6	6
(United Kingdom) P Hicks	6	0	1	2

==== Section 7 ====
First round

Second round
(United Kingdom) Charles Simond	7	8	4	6
(United Kingdom) CH Hole	5	6	6	4
(United Kingdom) C Moore	4	7	6	6
(United Kingdom) Frank Pearson	6	5	4	3
(Germany) Curt Bergmann	6	0	6	10
(Belgium) Paul de Borman	0	6	2	8
(United Kingdom) Arthur Gore	6	6	6
(United Kingdom) LE Milburn	2	2	4

Third round
(United Kingdom) C Simond	5	6	6	5
(United Kingdom) C Moore	7	8	3	7
(Germany) C Bergmann	4	4	4
(United Kingdom) A Gore	6	6	6

Fourth round
(United Kingdom) C Moore	6	6	4
(United Kingdom) A Gore	8	8	6

==== Section 8 ====
First round

Second round
(Canada) Robert Powell	6	6	6
(New Zealand) L Bonnington	2	2	4
(United Kingdom) Ernest Parton	6	8	6
(United Kingdom) AJ Jiminez	3	6	0
(United Kingdom) FN Warden
(United Kingdom) D Macleod	w/o
(United Kingdom) RWF Harding	6	6	6
(United Kingdom) Hamilton Price	3	3	2

Third round
(Canada) R Powell	6	6	6
(United Kingdom) E Parton	2	1	1
(United Kingdom) FN Warden	5	6	4	6	6
(United Kingdom) RWF Harding	7	1	6	3	1

Fourth round
(Canada) R Powell	6	6	8
(United Kingdom) FN Warden	1	1	6

Preceded by 1912 Australasian Championships – Men's singles	Grand Slam men's singles	Succeeded by 1913 U.S. National Championships – Men's singles
