= 1909 Wimbledon Championships – Men's singles =

Men's singles
- 1909 Wimbledon Championships

Final
- Champion: (United Kingdom) Arthur Gore
- Runner-up: (United Kingdom) Major Ritchie
- Score: 6–8, 1–6, 6–2, 6–2, 6–2

Details
- Draw: 85
- Seeds: –

Events
Singles	men	women
Doubles	men	women
- Wimbledon Championships

Major Ritchie defeated Herbert Roper Barrett 6–2, 6–3, 4–6, 6–4 in the All Comers' Final, but the reigning champion Arthur Gore defeated Ritchie 6–8, 1–6, 6–2, 6–2, 6–2 in the challenge round to win the gentlemen's singles tennis title at the 1909 Wimbledon Championships. Arthur Gore was the oldest winner of the title at 41 years and 182 days.

== Draw ==
Key

- Q = Qualifier
- WC = Wild card
- LL = Lucky loser
- Alt = Alternate
- ITF = ITF entry
- PR = Protected ranking
- SR = Special ranking
- SE = Special exempt
- JE = Junior exempt
- JR = Junior Accelerator Programme entrant
- CO = College Accelerator Programme entrant
- NG = Next Gen Accelerator Program entrant
- w/o = Walkover
- r = Retired
- d = Defaulted

=== Challenge round ===
Challenge Round
(United Kingdom) Major Ritchie	8	6	2	2	2
(United Kingdom) Arthur Gore	6	1	6	6	6

=== All comers' finals ===
Quarterfinals
(United Kingdom) Theodore Mavrogordato	6	9	2	4	6
(United Kingdom) George Caridia	1	7	6	6	4
(United Kingdom) Charles Dixon	10	1	1	4
(United Kingdom) Major Ritchie	8	6	6	6
(United Kingdom) Lionel Escombe	6	5	9	0^{r}
(United Kingdom) Herbert Roper Barrett	4	7	11	0
(United Kingdom) Gordon Lowe	10	0	4
(Germany) Friedrich Rahe	12	6	6

Semifinals
(United Kingdom) Theodore Mavrogordato	6	3	3	2
(United Kingdom) Major Ritchie	3	6	6	6
(United Kingdom) Herbert Roper Barrett	6	6	6	7
(Germany) Friedrich Rahe	4	2	8	5

Final
(United Kingdom) Major Ritchie	6	6	4	6
(United Kingdom) Herbert Roper Barrett	2	3	6	4

=== Top half ===
==== Section 1 ====
First round

Second round
(United Kingdom) George Thomas	4	6	6	7
(India) Sirdar Nihal Singh	6	2	2	5
(Belgium) Georges Watson	7	6	6
(United Kingdom) Kenneth Ingram	5	4	4
(United Kingdom) Dunstan Rhodes	9	6	6
(United Kingdom) RB Gurney	7	0	3
(United Kingdom) Theodore Mavrogordato	6	6	6
(United Kingdom) T Ennis	0	4	0

Third round
(United Kingdom) G Thomas	7	6	3	6
(Belgium) G Watson	5	3	6	3
(United Kingdom) D Rhodes	0	0	1
(United Kingdom) T Mavrogordato	6	6	6

Fourth round
(United Kingdom) G Thomas	5	4	4
(United Kingdom) T Mavrogordato	7	6	6

==== Section 2 ====
First round

Second round
(United Kingdom) Charles Tuckey
(United Kingdom) E Morris Hall	w/o
(United Kingdom) Douglas Kitching	5	6	6	6
(Australia) Les Poidevin	7	2	4	4
(United Kingdom) George Caridia	6	6	8
(United Kingdom) Alfred Crawley	0	4	6
(United Kingdom) Wilberforce Eaves	6	6	0
(United Kingdom) Clement Cazalet	4	3	0^{r}

Third round
(United Kingdom) C Tuckey	6	2	1	6	3
(United Kingdom) D Kitching	2	6	6	2	6
(United Kingdom) G Caridia	4	6	6	6
(United Kingdom) W Eaves	6	3	1	2

Fourth round
(United Kingdom) D Kitching	1	3	2
(United Kingdom) G Caridia	6	6	6

==== Section 3 ====
First round
(New Zealand) TR Quill	11	7	6
(United Kingdom) RH Hotham	9	5	4
(United Kingdom) Fritz Goldberg	7	6	6
(United Kingdom) LE Milburn	5	1	0
(Argentina) Stanley Knight	6	1	6	6
(United Kingdom) RD Nolan	4	6	2	1

Second round
(United Kingdom) Charles Dixon	6	6	4	6
(Belgium) William le Maire de Warzée	2	2	6	4
(United Kingdom) JB Ward	6	6	7
(United Kingdom) Sydney Watts	2	4	5
(Belgium) Réginald Storms	w/o
(New Zealand) TR Quill
(United Kingdom) F Goldberg	6	4	6	6
(Argentina) S Knight	3	6	0	3

Third round
(United Kingdom) C Dixon	9	6	6	6
(United Kingdom) JB Ward	7	1	8	0
(New Zealand) TR Quill	2	6	0	4
(United Kingdom) F Goldberg	6	1	6	6

Fourth round
(United Kingdom) C Dixon	11	6	6
(United Kingdom) F Goldberg	9	3	3

==== Section 4 ====
First round
(Australia) Stanley Doust	4	6	10	6
(Germany) Moritz von Bissing	6	2	8	2
(Argentina) Henry Knight
(United Kingdom) WE Lane	w/o
(United Kingdom) Major Ritchie	6	6	6
(United Kingdom) HB Routledge	1	1	2
(New Zealand) Harry Parker	6	6	6
(United Kingdom) HS Fellowes	1	3	3
(United Kingdom) Henry Wilson-Fox
(United Kingdom) Albert Prebble	w/o
(United Kingdom) Percival Davson	7	6	5	6
(United Kingdom) BC Hopson	5	3	7	2
(United Kingdom) CS Gordon-Smith	6	6	6
(United Kingdom) CJ Adams	1	1	0
(United Kingdom) John Flavelle	4	6	11	5	6
(France) RF Quennessen	6	2	9	7	0

Second round
(Australia) S Doust	6	6	7
(Argentina) H Knight	2	2	5
(United Kingdom) M Ritchie	0	6	6	6
(New Zealand) H Parker	6	2	3	3
(United Kingdom) H Wilson-Fox	2	2	5
(United Kingdom) P Davson	6	6	7
(United Kingdom) CS Gordon-Smith	2	0	0
(United Kingdom) J Flavelle	6	6	6

Third round
(Australia) S Doust	5	3	5
(United Kingdom) M Ritchie	7	6	7
(United Kingdom) P Davson	8	2	4
(United Kingdom) J Flavelle	6	6	2^{r}

Fourth round
(United Kingdom) M Ritchie	6	6	2
(United Kingdom) P Davson	2	2	0^{r}

=== Bottom half ===
==== Section 5 ====
First round
(United Kingdom) William Blew
(United Kingdom) Evan Gwynne-Evans	w/o
(United Kingdom) Charles Ridding	6	7	6
(United Kingdom) Charles Simond	1	5	4
(United Kingdom) Stanley Franklin	4	4	6	8	6
(United Kingdom) Ernest Wills	6	6	4	6	3
(United Kingdom) George Coulson	6	7	4	6
(Netherlands) Otto Blom	3	5	6	3
(United Kingdom) EW Timmis	6	7	5	6
(United Kingdom) Robert Dudley	0	5	7	3
(United Kingdom) Glen Walker	6	6	6
(United Kingdom) L Bidlake	4	1	4
(Belgium) Louis Trasenster	6	7	6
(United Kingdom) E Yatman	3	5	3
(United Kingdom) Lionel Escombe	6	6	6
(United Kingdom) David Hawes	0	0	2

Second round
(United Kingdom) W Blew	2	6	6	3
(United Kingdom) C Ridding	6	3	8	6
(United Kingdom) S Franklin	3	3	6	6	6
(United Kingdom) G Coulson	6	6	3	4	1
(United Kingdom) EW Timmis	6	6	3	8
(United Kingdom) G Walker	1	1	6	6
(Belgium) L Trasenster	6	3	0	4
(United Kingdom) L Escombe	3	6	6	6

Third round
(United Kingdom) C Ridding	6	6	6
(United Kingdom) S Franklin	1	1	1
(United Kingdom) EW Timmis	4	2	3
(United Kingdom) L Escombe	6	6	6

Fourth round
(United Kingdom) C Ridding	3	6	6	4	3
(United Kingdom) L Escombe	6	4	3	6	6

==== Section 6 ====
First round
(United Kingdom) James Cecil Parke	6	6	6
(United Kingdom) Augustus Hendriks	2	0	2
(United Kingdom) Herbert Roper Barrett	6	6	6
(United Kingdom) James Powell	1	1	1

Second round
(United Kingdom) JC Parke	3	2	4
(United Kingdom) HR Barrett	6	6	6
(United Kingdom) GTC Watt	6	6	8
(United Kingdom) George Allen	2	4	6
(United Kingdom) AW Andrews	6	6	6
(United Kingdom) Brame Hillyard	3	3	3
(United States) DP Rhodes	4	6	6	6
(United Kingdom) Henry Pollard	6	1	3	2

Third round
(United Kingdom) HR Barrett	6	6	6
(United Kingdom) GTC Watt	1	1	1
(United Kingdom) AW Andrews	2	4	1
(United States) D Rhodes	6	6	6

Fourth round
(United Kingdom) HR Barrett	6	5	6	6
(United States) D Rhodes	3	7	3	1

==== Section 7 ====
First round

Second round
(United Kingdom) Arthur Lowe	6	6	8
(United Kingdom) Alfred Taylor	2	2	6
(United Kingdom) Gordon Lowe	6	6	6
(United Kingdom) Anthony Prinsep	4	4	3
(United Kingdom) RS Barnes	6	6	6
(United Kingdom) HL Brunton	4	3	3
(United Kingdom) Alfred Beamish	6	0
(United Kingdom) AC Butler	2	0^{r}

Third round
(United Kingdom) A Lowe	6	2	3	2
(United Kingdom) G Lowe	3	6	6	6
(United Kingdom) RS Barnes	6	0	4	5
(United Kingdom) A Beamish	3	6	6	7

Fourth round
(United Kingdom) G Lowe	0	6	6	1	6
(United Kingdom) A Beamish	6	3	4	6	3

==== Section 8 ====
First round

Second round
(United Kingdom) Kenneth Powell	6	6	6
(Canada) Robert Powell	1	3	4
(Belgium) Paul de Borman	6	9	0	7
(United Kingdom) Geoffrey Fowler	1	7	6	5
(Germany) Friedrich Rahe	4	6	6	8
(United Kingdom) Thomas Haydon	6	1	4	6
(United Kingdom) J Robinson	9	3	6	8
(United Kingdom) Roderick McNair	7	6	0	6

Third round
(United Kingdom) K Powell	3	6	6	6
(Belgium) P de Borman	6	1	1	3
(Germany) F Rahe	6	6	6
(United Kingdom) J Robinson	1	2	2

Fourth round
(United Kingdom) K Powell	3	6	6	3	3
(Germany) F Rahe	6	3	0	6	6

Preceded by 1908 Australasian Championships – Men's singles	Grand Slam men's singles	Succeeded by 1909 U.S. National Championships – Men's singles
