= 1910 Wimbledon Championships – Men's singles =

Men's singles
- 1910 Wimbledon Championships

Final
- Champion: (New Zealand) Anthony Wilding
- Runner-up: (United Kingdom) Arthur Gore
- Score: 6–4, 7–5, 4–6, 6–2

Details
- Draw: 92
- Seeds: –

Events
Singles	men	women
Doubles	men	women
- Wimbledon Championships

Anthony Wilding defeated Beals Wright 4–6, 4–6, 6–3, 6–2, 6–3 in the All Comers' Final, and then defeated the reigning champion Arthur Gore 6–4, 7–5, 4–6, 6–2 in the challenge round to win the gentlemen's singles tennis title at the 1910 Wimbledon Championships.

== Draw ==
Key

- Q = Qualifier
- WC = Wild card
- LL = Lucky loser
- Alt = Alternate
- ITF = ITF entry
- PR = Protected ranking
- SR = Special ranking
- SE = Special exempt
- JE = Junior exempt
- JR = Junior Accelerator Programme entrant
- CO = College Accelerator Programme entrant
- NG = Next Gen Accelerator Program entrant
- w/o = Walkover
- r = Retired
- d = Defaulted

=== Challenge round ===
Challenge Round
(New Zealand) Anthony Wilding	6	7	4	6
(United Kingdom) Arthur Gore	4	5	6	2

=== All comers' finals ===
Quarterfinals
(United Kingdom) Alfred Beamish	6	7	4	3
(United Kingdom) James Cecil Parke	8	5	6	6
(New Zealand) Anthony Wilding	6	6	6
(Germany) Otto Froitzheim	1	1	2
(United Kingdom) Arthur Lowe	6	6	2	6
(Australia) Stanley Doust	3	3	6	4
(United States) Beals Wright	6	6	6
(Canada) Robert Powell	3	1	1

Semifinals
(United Kingdom) James Cecil Parke	5	1	2
(New Zealand) Anthony Wilding	7	6	6
(United Kingdom) Arthur Lowe	3	6	4	4
(United States) Beals Wright	6	3	6	6

Final
(New Zealand) Anthony Wilding	4	4	6	6	6
(United States) Beals Wright	6	6	3	2	3

=== Top half ===
==== Section 1 ====
First round

Second round
(United Kingdom) Alfred Beamish	6	6	6
(United Kingdom) Henry Wilson-Fox	2	3	4
(United Kingdom) HS Fellowes	6	4	9	6
(United Kingdom) Stanley Franklin	4	6	7	3
(United Kingdom) Frank Pearson	6	6	6
(United Kingdom) WJ Lancaster	2	0	3
(United Kingdom) RS Barnes	6	6	6
(United Kingdom) J Robinson	2	2	1

Third round
(United Kingdom) A Beamish	6	6	6
(United Kingdom) HS Fellowes	4	4	2
(United Kingdom) F Pearson	6	2	4	3
(United Kingdom) RS Barnes	4	6	6	6

Fourth round
(United Kingdom) A Beamish	6	6	11
(United Kingdom) RS Barnes	2	4	9

==== Section 2 ====
First round

Second round
(Denmark) Ove Frederiksen	6	6	6
(United Kingdom) CJ Adams	3	2	0
(United Kingdom) Theodore Mavrogordato	4	6	0
(Australia) Leslie Poidevin	6	4	0^{r}
(United Kingdom) George Simond
(United Kingdom) AF Stephen	w/o
(United Kingdom) James Cecil Parke	6	6	6
(United Kingdom) John Flavelle	1	1	1

Third round
(Denmark) O Frederiksen	1	1	3
(United Kingdom) T Mavrogordato	6	6	6
(United Kingdom) G Simond	2	3	0^{r}
(United Kingdom) JC Parke	6	6	0

Fourth round
(United Kingdom) T Mavrogordato	6	6	6	5	4
(United Kingdom) JC Parke	1	8	2	7	6

==== Section 3 ====
First round
(United Kingdom) Roderick McNair	6	6	6
(United Kingdom) Dunstan Rhodes	2	0	1
(United Kingdom) Robert Dudley	6	6	2	3	6
(United Kingdom) Anthony Prinsep	2	3	6	6	1
(United Kingdom) Major Ritchie	6	6	6
(United Kingdom) AR Sawyer	2	0	2
(United Kingdom) David Hawes	6	6	6
(Denmark) Jørgen Arenholt	3	1	3
(United Kingdom) JB Ward	8	6	7
(United Kingdom) WP Wise	6	0	5
(New Zealand) Anthony Wilding	4	6	6	6
(United Kingdom) Herbert Roper Barrett	6	4	1	4

Second round
(United Kingdom) LE Milburn	5	4	6	6	6
(Denmark) Leif Rovsing	7	6	1	1	2
(United Kingdom) R McNair	6	6	6
(United Kingdom) R Dudley	2	1	3
(United Kingdom) M Ritchie	6	6	6
(United Kingdom) D Hawes	0	1	1
(United Kingdom) JB Ward	1	0	0
(New Zealand) A Wilding	6	6	6

Third round
(United Kingdom) LE Milburn	3	8	5
(United Kingdom) R McNair	6	10	7
(United Kingdom) M Ritchie	2	3	7	2
(New Zealand) A Wilding	6	6	5	6

Fourth round
(United Kingdom) R McNair	0	0	0
(New Zealand) A Wilding	6	6	6

==== Section 4 ====
First round
(United Kingdom) Augustus Hendriks	6	7	5	6
(United Kingdom) Hamilton Price	1	5	7	2
(United Kingdom) HWD Gallwey
(United Kingdom) St John Pym	w/o
(United Kingdom) Kenneth Powell	6	6	6
(United Kingdom) John Ganzoni	3	0	0
(South Africa) HW Sevenoaks	6	6	1	8
(United Kingdom) Sydney Watts	3	2	6	6
(Germany) Otto Froitzheim	4	6	6	4
(India) Athar-Ali Fyzee	6	3	3	0^{r}
(India) Hassan Ali Fyzee	6	6	5	7
(United Kingdom) Neville Deed	1	4	7	5
(United Kingdom) E Morris Hall	1	6	2	6	5
(United Kingdom) EW Timmis	6	3	6	4	7
(United Kingdom) Ernest Parton	1	2	2
(United Kingdom) Wilberforce Eaves	6	6	6

Second round
(United Kingdom) A Hendriks	6	2	6	6
(United Kingdom) HWD Gallwey	1	6	2	4
(United Kingdom) K Powell	6	6	6
(South Africa) HW Sevenoaks	1	1	2
(Germany) O Froitzheim	6	4	6	6
(India) HA Fyzee	1	6	2	4
(United Kingdom) EW Timmis	6	0	0	2
(United Kingdom) W Eaves	2	6	6	6

Third round
(United Kingdom) A Hendriks	1	4	2
(United Kingdom) K Powell	6	6	6
(Germany) O Froitzheim	9	6	6
(United Kingdom) W Eaves	7	3	2

Fourth round
(United Kingdom) K Powell	6	3	5
(Germany) O Froitzheim	8	6	7

=== Bottom half ===
==== Section 5 ====
First round
(United Kingdom) Henry Pollard	6	6	7
(United Kingdom) AC Holland	4	2	5
(South Africa) Walter Tripp	6	11	7
(United Kingdom) Charles Simond	3	9	5
(Netherlands) Otto Blom	6	9	4	6	6
(United Kingdom) Arthur Cronin	3	11	6	2	2
(United States) George Nettleton	6	6	6
(United Kingdom) Rudolf Pfleiderer	2	3	2
(United Kingdom) Charles Dixon	7	6	4	6
(United Kingdom) Valentine Miley	5	4	6	3
(United Kingdom) RD Nolan
(United Kingdom) WD Waller	w/o
(United Kingdom) Percival Davson	6	0	6	6
(United States) Samuel Hardy	3	6	3	0
(United Kingdom) Arthur Lowe	6	6	6
(United Kingdom) AC Butler	2	2	2

Second round
(United Kingdom) H Pollard	4	6	8	2	1
(South Africa) W Tripp	6	2	6	6	6
(Netherlands) O Blom	6	6	2	7
(United States) G Nettleton	3	2	6	5
(United Kingdom) C Dixon	6	6	11
(United Kingdom) RD Nolan	3	2	9
(United Kingdom) P Davson	8	2	4	7	3
(United Kingdom) A Lowe	6	6	6	5	6

Third round
(South Africa) W Tripp	5	6	7	3
(Netherlands) O Blom	7	8	5	6
(United Kingdom) C Dixon	4	6	4	6	3
(United Kingdom) A Lowe	6	2	6	3	6

Fourth round
(Netherlands) O Blom	2	2	1
(United Kingdom) A Lowe	6	6	6

==== Section 6 ====
First round
(Australia) Stanley Doust	6	6	6
(France) André Gobert	2	2	1
(Australia) Eric Pockley
(United Kingdom) H Clement	w/o
(United Kingdom) F Good	6	6	6
(United Kingdom) George Allen	2	2	1
(United Kingdom) Thomas Haydon	6	6	6
(United Kingdom) ALH Mulcahy	2	1	1
(United Kingdom) CS Gordon-Smith	9	6	6
(United Kingdom) EWH Scott	7	1	3
(United Kingdom) WG Milburn	6	6	9
(United Kingdom) ND Malcolm	3	2	7

Second round
(Australia) S Doust	6	6	6
(Australia) E Pockley	4	1	2
(United Kingdom) F Good	6	2	4	3
(United Kingdom) T Haydon	0	6	6	6
(United Kingdom) CS Gordon-Smith	6	6	6
(United Kingdom) WG Milburn	2	2	2
(Germany) Oscar Kreuzer	w/o
(United Kingdom) TD Stoward

Third round
(Australia) S Doust	6	6	6
(United Kingdom) T Haydon	3	3	3
(United Kingdom) CS Gordon-Smith	6	7	6
(United Kingdom) TD Stoward	3	5	4

Fourth round
(Australia) S Doust	6	6	6
(United Kingdom) CS Gordon-Smith	3	0	2

==== Section 7 ====
First round

Second round
(United Kingdom) Gordon Lowe	6	6	6
(United Kingdom) AW Andrews	3	3	1
(United States) Beals Wright	6	7	3	6
(United Kingdom) Walter Crawley	1	5	6	2
(United Kingdom) Geoffrey Roberts	8	6	6
(United Kingdom) James Powell	6	3	2
(India) Sirdar Nihal Singh	6	6	6
(United States) AC Bostwick	1	0	2

Third round
(United Kingdom) G Lowe	1	3	0
(United States) B Wright	6	6	6
(United Kingdom) G Roberts	6	7	6
(India) S Nihal Singh	4	5	4

Fourth round
(United States) B Wright	6	6	6
(United Kingdom) G Roberts	1	2	2

==== Section 8 ====
First round

Second round
(United Kingdom) George Thomas	6	6	6
(Denmark) P Groes-Petersen	1	4	4
(United Kingdom) Albert Prebble	6	10	6
(United States) A Holmes	4	8	4
(Canada) Robert Powell
(United Kingdom) CE Fox	w/o
(United Kingdom) Brame Hillyard	6	6	6
(United Kingdom) Bernhard Pfleiderer	2	1	1

Third round
(United Kingdom) G Thomas	5	6	4	6	6
(United Kingdom) A Prebble	7	3	6	2	4
(Canada) R Powell	7	6	6
(United Kingdom) B Hillyard	5	1	4

Fourth round
(United Kingdom) G Thomas	4	7	6	4
(Canada) R Powell	6	9	4	6

Preceded by 1909 Australasian Championships – Men's singles	Grand Slam men's singles	Succeeded by 1910 U.S. National Championships – Men's singles
