= 1908 Wimbledon Championships – Men's doubles =

Men's doubles
- 1908 Wimbledon Championships

Final
- Champions: (United Kingdom) Major Ritchie (New Zealand) Anthony Wilding
- Runners-up: (United Kingdom) Herbert Roper Barrett (United Kingdom) Arthur Gore
- Score: 6–1, 6–2, 1–6, 9–7

Details
- Draw: 34
- Seeds: –

Events
Singles	men	women
Doubles	men	women
- Wimbledon Championships

Norman Brookes and Anthony Wilding were the defending champions, but Brookes did not participate. Wilding partnered with Major Ritchie and they defeated Herbert Roper Barrett and Arthur Gore 6–1, 6–2, 1–6, 9–7 in the all comers' final to win the gentlemen's doubles tennis title at the 1908 Wimbledon Championships.

== Draw ==
Key

- Q = Qualifier
- WC = Wild card
- LL = Lucky loser
- Alt = Alternate
- ITF = ITF entry
- PR = Protected ranking
- SR = Special ranking
- SE = Special exempt
- JE = Junior exempt
- JR = Junior Accelerator Programme entrant
- CO = College Accelerator Programme entrant
- NG = Next Gen Accelerator Program entrant
- w/o = Walkover
- r = Retired
- d = Defaulted

=== All comers' finals ===
Quarterfinals
(United Kingdom) Charles Dixon (United Kingdom) Albert Prebble	7	6	3	6
(United Kingdom) Roderick McNair (United Kingdom) George Thomas	5	3	6	3
(United Kingdom) Alfred Beamish (Canada) Robert Powell	1	1	5
(United Kingdom) Herbert Roper Barrett (United Kingdom) Arthur Gore	6	6	7
(United Kingdom) Major Ritchie (New Zealand) Anthony Wilding	6	6	6
(United States) Wylie Grant (United Kingdom) A. Wallis Myers	1	1	3
(United Kingdom) Clement Cazalet (United Kingdom) George Hillyard	6	6	9
(United Kingdom) Charles Gordon-Smith (United Kingdom) Augustus Hendriks	1	0	7

Semifinals
(United Kingdom) Charles Dixon (United Kingdom) Albert Prebble	2	6	3	4
(United Kingdom) Herbert Roper Barrett (United Kingdom) Arthur Gore	6	2	6	6
(United Kingdom) Major Ritchie (New Zealand) Anthony Wilding	6	4	4	7	7
(United Kingdom) Clement Cazalet (United Kingdom) George Hillyard	3	6	6	5	5

Final
(United Kingdom) Herbert Roper Barrett (United Kingdom) Arthur Gore	1	2	6	7
(United Kingdom) Major Ritchie (New Zealand) Anthony Wilding	6	6	1	9

=== Top half ===
==== Section 1 ====
First round

Second round
(United Kingdom) Douglas Kitching (United Kingdom) AR Sawyer	4	6	6	6
(United Kingdom) CH Mounsey (United Kingdom) Alfred Sterry	6	3	2	2
(United Kingdom) Charles Dixon (United Kingdom) Albert Prebble	6	5	11	6
(Germany) Oscar Kreuzer (Germany) Friedrich Rahe	3	7	9	3
(United Kingdom) ER Clarke (United Kingdom) EW Timmis	6	6	6
(United Kingdom) Maj. Roe (United Kingdom) FN Warden	2	4	3
(United Kingdom) Roderick McNair (United Kingdom) George Thomas	6	6	7
(France) Pierre Verdé-Delisle (France) Élie de Lastours	3	4	5

Third round
(United Kingdom) D Kitching (United Kingdom) A Sawyer	1	6	1	4
(United Kingdom) C Dixon (United Kingdom) A Prebble	6	4	6	6
(United Kingdom) ER Clarke (United Kingdom) EW Timmis	3	3	10
(United Kingdom) R McNair (United Kingdom) G Thomas	6	6	12

Quarterfinals
(United Kingdom) C Dixon (United Kingdom) A Prebble	7	6	3	6
(United Kingdom) R McNair (United Kingdom) G Thomas	5	3	6	3

==== Section 2 ====
First round
(United Kingdom) William Crawley (United Kingdom) Kenneth Powell
(Germany) Otto Froitzheim (Germany) Moritz von Bissing	w/o

Second round
(United Kingdom) Alfred Beamish (Canada) Robert Powell
(United Kingdom) GL Orme (United Kingdom) E Yatman	w/o
(United Kingdom) FH Bryant (United Kingdom) VM Hill	4	6	6	6
(United Kingdom) WP Haviland (United Kingdom) RH Hotham	6	2	3	4
(United Kingdom) Herbert Roper Barrett (United Kingdom) Arthur Gore	6	6	10
(United Kingdom) TD Stoward (United Kingdom) JB Ward	4	1	8
(United Kingdom) Charles Ridding (United Kingdom) Ernest Wills	1	2	2
(United Kingdom) W Crawley (United Kingdom) K Powell	6	6	6

Third round
(United Kingdom) A Beamish (Canada) R Powell	6	4	6	6
(United Kingdom) FH Bryant (United Kingdom) VM Hill	3	6	3	3
(United Kingdom) HR Barrett (United Kingdom) A Gore	6	6	6
(United Kingdom) W Crawley (United Kingdom) K Powell	1	2	4

Quarterfinals
(United Kingdom) A Beamish (Canada) R Powell	1	1	5
(United Kingdom) HR Barrett (United Kingdom) A Gore	6	6	'7

=== Bottom half ===
==== Section 3 ====
First round
(United Kingdom) Major Ritchie (New Zealand) Anthony Wilding	6	6	6
(South Africa) Victor Gauntlett (South Africa) Harold Kitson	2	4	1

Second round
(United Kingdom) M Ritchie (New Zealand) A Wilding	6	6	6
(United Kingdom) George Ball-Greene (United Kingdom) Wilberforce Eaves	1	3	0
(United Kingdom) Fritz Goldberg (United Kingdom) Theodore Mavrogordato
(United Kingdom) Frederick Plaskitt (United Kingdom) Hugh Plaskitt	w/o
(United States) Wylie Grant (United Kingdom) A. Wallis Myers
(United Kingdom) Dunstan Rhodes (United Kingdom) FF Roe	w/o
(United Kingdom) Reginald Doherty (United Kingdom) George Simond	7	6	8
(Belgium) William le Maire de Warzée (Belgium) Paul de Borman	5	4	6

Third round
(United Kingdom) M Ritchie (New Zealand) A Wilding	6	8	6
(United Kingdom) F Goldberg (United Kingdom) T Mavrogordato	2	6	1
(United States) W Grant (United Kingdom) AW Myers	8	0
(United Kingdom) R Doherty (United Kingdom) G Simond	6	0^{r}

Quarterfinals
(United Kingdom) M Ritchie (New Zealand) A Wilding	6	6	6
(United States) W Grant (United Kingdom) AW Myers	1	1	3

==== Section 4 ====
First round

Second round
(United Kingdom) Clement Cazalet (United Kingdom) George Hillyard	3	6	6	7
(United Kingdom) Percival Davson (United Kingdom) John Flavelle	6	3	2	5
(United Kingdom) Arthur Lowe (United Kingdom) Gordon Lowe	6	6	3	4	6
(United Kingdom) WS Andrews (United Kingdom) Evan Gwynne-Evans	1	4	6	6	2
(United Kingdom) CS Gordon-Smith (United Kingdom) Augustus Hendriks	6	6	6
(United Kingdom) Valentine Miley (United Kingdom) Otway Toler	3	3	3
(United Kingdom) Sydney Watts (United Kingdom) H Whale
(United Kingdom) Lionel Escombe (United Kingdom) Henry Pollard	w/o

Third round
(United Kingdom) C Cazalet (United Kingdom) G Hillyard	7	7	6
(United Kingdom) A Lowe (United Kingdom) G Lowe	5	5	1
(United Kingdom) CS Gordon-Smith (United Kingdom) A Hendriks	6	6	6
(United Kingdom) S Watts (United Kingdom) H Whale	0	4	2

Quarterfinals
(United Kingdom) C Cazalet (United Kingdom) G Hillyard	6	6	9
(United Kingdom) CS Gordon-Smith (United Kingdom) A Hendriks	1	0	7
