= 1912 Wimbledon Championships =

- Date: 24 June – 8 July
- Edition: 36th
- Category: Grand Slam
- Surface: Grass
- Location: Worple Road; SW19, Wimbledon, London, United Kingdom
- Venue: All England Lawn Tennis and Croquet Club

Champions

Men's singles
- (New Zealand) Anthony Wilding

Women's singles
- (United Kingdom of Great Britain and Ireland) Ethel Larcombe

Men's doubles
- (United Kingdom of Great Britain and Ireland) Herbert Roper Barrett / (United Kingdom of Great Britain and Ireland) Charles Dixon
← 1911 ·	Wimbledon Championships	· 1913 →

The 1912 Wimbledon Championships took place on the outdoor grass courts at the All England Lawn Tennis and Croquet Club in Wimbledon, London, United Kingdom. The tournament ran from 24 June until 8 July. It was the 36th staging of the Wimbledon Championships, and the first Grand Slam tennis event of 1912.

== Champions ==
=== Men's singles ===
(New Zealand) Anthony Wilding defeated (United Kingdom of Great Britain and Ireland) Arthur Gore 6–4, 6–4, 4–6, 6–4

=== Women's singles ===
(United Kingdom of Great Britain and Ireland) Ethel Larcombe defeated (United Kingdom of Great Britain and Ireland) Charlotte Sterry 6–3, 6–1

=== Men's doubles ===
(United Kingdom of Great Britain and Ireland) Herbert Roper Barrett / (United Kingdom of Great Britain and Ireland) Charles Dixon defeated (France) Max Decugis / (France) André Gobert 3–6, 6–3, 6–4, 7–5

Preceded by 1911 Australasian Championships	Grand Slams	Succeeded by 1912 U.S. National Championships
