= Thomas Hicks (tennis) =

Australian tennis player

- Full name: Thomas Henry Hicks
- Country (sports): Australia
- Born: 15 May 1869 Sydney, New South Wales
- Died: 9 June 1956 (aged 87) Mosman, New South Wales
- College: Newington College

Thomas Henry Hicks (15 May 1869 – 6 September 1956) was an Australian tennis player and administrator who managed Australia and New Zealand's participation in early Davis Cup competitions. Hicks was born in Balmain, New South Wales, the first of eight children and four sons of Henry Hicks and Emily Garrett. He was the older brother of Ernest Hicks. Living in Stanmore, Hicks was educated at Newington College commencing in 1885 aged sixteen. Hicks was the Honorary Secretary of the Lawn Tennis Association of Australasia/Australia from 1904 until 1926.
