= 1909 Wimbledon Championships =

- Date: 21 June – 3 July
- Edition: 33rd
- Category: Grand Slam
- Surface: Grass
- Location: Worple Road; SW19, Wimbledon, London, United Kingdom
- Venue: All England Lawn Tennis and Croquet Club

Champions

Men's singles
- (United Kingdom of Great Britain and Ireland) Arthur Gore

Women's singles
- (United Kingdom of Great Britain and Ireland) Dora Boothby

Men's doubles
- (United Kingdom of Great Britain and Ireland) Herbert Roper Barrett / (United Kingdom of Great Britain and Ireland) Arthur Gore
- Wimbledon Championships

The 1909 Wimbledon Championships took place on the outdoor grass courts at the All England Lawn Tennis and Croquet Club in Wimbledon, London, United Kingdom. The tournament ran from 21 June until 3 July. It was the 33rd staging of the Wimbledon Championships, and the first Grand Slam tennis event of 1909.

This was the final Wimbledon tournament during the reign of King Edward VII.

== Champions ==
=== Men's singles ===
(United Kingdom of Great Britain and Ireland) Arthur Gore defeated (United Kingdom of Great Britain and Ireland) Major Ritchie 6–8, 1–6, 6–2, 6–2, 6–2

=== Women's singles ===
(United Kingdom of Great Britain and Ireland) Dora Boothby defeated (United Kingdom of Great Britain and Ireland) Agnes Morton 6–4, 4–6, 8–6

=== Men's doubles ===
(United Kingdom of Great Britain and Ireland) Herbert Roper Barrett / (United Kingdom of Great Britain and Ireland) Arthur Gore defeated (Australia) Stanley Doust / (New Zealand) Harry Parker, 6–2, 6–1, 6–4

Preceded by 1908 Australasian Championships	Grand Slams	Succeeded by 1909 U.S. National Championships
