= Ernest Hicks =

Australian tennis player

- Full name: Ernest William Hicks
- Country (sports): Australia
- Born: 14 January 1877 Balmain, New South Wales
- Died: 9 March 1956 (aged 79) Bowral, New South Wales
- College: Newington College

Ernest William Hicks (14 January 1877 – 3 September 1956) was an Australian tennis player who was a player/manager of his nation's Davis Cup team.

Hicks was born in Balmain, New South Wales, the fourth of eight children and second of four sons of Henry Hicks and Emily Garrett. His older brother was tennis administrator Thomas Hicks (1869–1956). Living in Stanmore, he was educated at Newington College commencing in 1891 aged fourteen.
