= 1910 Wimbledon Championships =

- Date: 20 – 30 June
- Edition: 34th
- Category: Grand Slam
- Surface: Grass
- Location: Worple Road; SW19, Wimbledon, London, United Kingdom
- Venue: All England Lawn Tennis and Croquet Club

Champions

Men's singles
- (New Zealand) Anthony Wilding

Women's singles
- (United Kingdom of Great Britain and Ireland) Dorothea Lambert Chambers

Men's doubles
- (United Kingdom of Great Britain and Ireland) Major Ritchie / (New Zealand) Anthony Wilding
- Wimbledon Championships

The 1910 Wimbledon Championships took place on the outdoor grass courts at the All England Lawn Tennis and Croquet Club in Wimbledon, London, United Kingdom. The tournament ran from 20 June until 30 June. It was the 34th staging of the Wimbledon Championships, and the second Grand Slam tennis event of 1910.

The All England Club laid asphalt pathways round the courts. There was a field of 92 competitors for the men's singles.

This was the first Wimbledon tournament during the reign of King George V.

== Champions ==
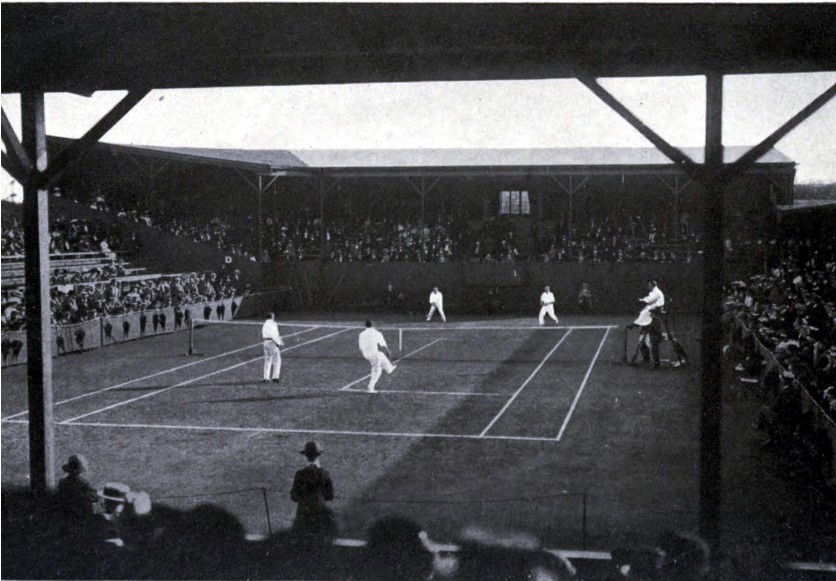
Wimbledon 1910, men's doubles final

=== Men's singles ===
(New Zealand) Anthony Wilding defeated (United Kingdom of Great Britain and Ireland) Arthur Gore 6–4, 7–5, 4–6, 6–2

=== Women's singles ===
(United Kingdom of Great Britain and Ireland) Dorothea Lambert Chambers defeated (United Kingdom of Great Britain and Ireland) Dora Boothby 6–2, 6–2

=== Men's doubles ===
(United Kingdom of Great Britain and Ireland) Major Ritchie / (New Zealand) Anthony Wilding defeated (United Kingdom of Great Britain and Ireland) Herbert Roper Barrett / (United Kingdom of Great Britain and Ireland) Arthur Gore, 6–1, 6–1, 6–2

Preceded by 1910 Australasian Championships	Grand Slams	Succeeded by 1910 U.S. National Championships
