= James Zimmermann =

British tennis player

- Full name: James Emil Hubert Zimmermann (James Emil Hubert Mann)
- Country (sports): United Kingdom
- Born: 6 March 1886 Brixton, London, England
- Died: 16 May 1917 (aged 31) Bullecourt, France
- Retired: 1917 (due to death)

Singles
- Career record: 48–14 (77.4%)
- Career titles: 4

Grand Slam singles results
- Wimbledon: QF (1912)

Grand Slam doubles results
- Wimbledon: 3R (1912)

James Emil Hubert Zimmermann (3 March 1886 – 16 May 1917) was a British tennis player in the years before World War I. His father was German, and Zimmerman was embarrassed by his German name, so he abbreviated his surname to Mann. He reached the quarterfinals of the Wimbledon men's singles in 1912 where he lost in straight sets to Alfred Beamish. He lost in the second round at Wimbledon in 1913 to Percival Davson.

According to his obituary in the Sydney newspaper Referee on 17 October 1917, Zimmermann was "always popular with the crowd, for his garrulity on court, though sometimes disconcerting to his opponents, he had a vein of humour and irresponsibility". In 1915, his habit of sleepwalking led him into danger when he was found wandering on the Brighton railway line near Victoria station (he was sentenced to six months imprisonment, though the sentence was quashed on appeal). In World War I, Zimmermann was a sergeant in the Honourable Artillery Company (HAC) and died from wounds sustained in action in 1917.
