= Neville Willford =

British tennis player

- Country (sports): United Kingdom
- Born: 1882; Yorkshire, United Kingdom
- Died: 1947 (aged 64); Sussex, United Kingdom
- Turned pro: 1905 (amateur tour)
- Retired: 1927

Singles

Grand Slam singles results
- Wimbledon: QF (1920)

Doubles

Grand Slam doubles results
- Wimbledon: 3R (1912, 1914)

Mixed doubles

Grand Slam mixed doubles results
- Wimbledon: 2R (1914, 1920)

Neville Willford (1882–1947) was a British tennis player in the years before and after World war 1. His best performance in Wimbledon men's singles was a quarter final in 1920 (where he lost to Zenzo Shimizu). At Wimbledon in 1924, Willford won a set against eventual champion Jean Borotra in the men's singles first round. Willford's Wimbledon singles career spanned the years from 1912 to 1926. Willford died in Sussex in 1947 aged 64.
