= Les Poidevin =

Australian tennis player and cricketer

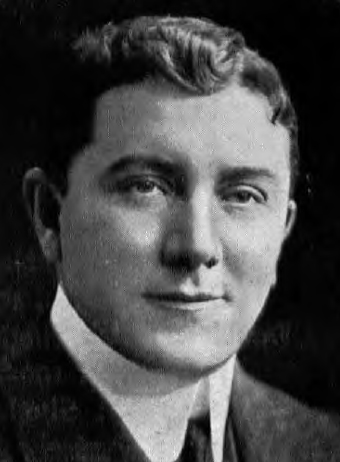

Personal information
- Full name: Leslie Oswald Sheridan Poidevin
- Born: 5 November 1876; Merrilla, New South Wales
- Died: 19 November 1931 (aged 55); Waverley, Sydney, New South Wales
- Batting: Right-handed
- Bowling: Right-arm slow

Domestic team information
- Years: Team
- 1895/96–1904/05: New South Wales
- 1902–1904: London County
- 1904–1908: Lancashire
- FC debut: 14 December 1895 NSW v Canterbury
- Last FC: 1 August 1908 Lancashire v Yorkshire

Career statistics
Competition	First-class
Matches	149
Runs scored	70,22
Batting average	32.96
100s/50s	14/31
Top score	179
Balls bowled	3,170
Wickets	46
Bowling average	41.89
5 wickets in innings	2
10 wickets in match	0
Best bowling	8/66
Catches/stumpings	162/–
- Source: CricketArchive, 29 June 2025

- Country (sports): Australia

Singles
- Career record: 101–43
- Career titles: 13

Grand Slam singles results
- Wimbledon: 2R (1909, 1910)

Other tournaments
- Olympic Games: QF (1908^{In})

Grand Slam doubles results
- Wimbledon: SF (1910)

Team competitions
- Davis Cup: F (1906)

Leslie Oswald Sheridan Poidevin (5 November 1876 – 19 November 1931) was an Australian tennis player and first-class cricketer who played for New South Wales and Lancashire County Cricket Club.

== Biography ==
A right-handed batsman who was strong in defence, Poidevin started his first class cricket career with New South Wales in 1895. In 1901, he contributed an unbeaten 140 out of the team's total of 918 runs, which was a record team score at the time. He would only bat in 23 innings for NSW over the course of his career, but his average of 57.73 ranks favourably among the finest players who have played for the state. In the 1901–02 Ashes series, Poidevin was the twelfth man for the first Test match. He was scheduled to make his Test debut in the second Test match but suffered a finger injury prior to the game.

At the turn of the century, he came to England to study medicine and began playing cricket for London County. After three seasons with London County, he qualified to play for Lancashire and helped them win the championship in 1904, his debut season with the county. During the season, he made 865 runs at 34. He topped Lancashire's averages the following year with 44 after managing a total of 1376 runs.

Poidevin also played international tennis, representing Australasia in the 1906 Davis Cup as well as in Grand Slams (though missing the 1908 Summer Olympics because of administrative bungling).

Poidevin died on 19 November 1931 at Waverley, New South Wales, Australia. His parents were Napoleon R and Emma Poidevin. He was survived by his wife, Isabel Marianne Poidevin (née Barns), and his two children, Gwen and Les. He was buried in the South Head Cemetery, Old South Head Road, Vaucluse, New South Wales, on Friday, 20 November 1931, following a funeral attended by a large number of cricket and tennis representatives and personal friends.
