= 1911 Wimbledon Championships =

- Date: 26 June – 8 July
- Edition: 35th
- Category: Grand Slam
- Surface: Grass
- Location: Worple Road; SW19, Wimbledon, London, United Kingdom
- Venue: All England Lawn Tennis and Croquet Club

Champions

Men's singles
- (New Zealand) Anthony Wilding

Women's singles
- (United Kingdom of Great Britain and Ireland) Dorothea Lambert Chambers

Men's doubles
- (France) Max Decugis / (France) André Gobert
- Wimbledon Championships

The 1911 Wimbledon Championships took place on the outdoor grass courts at the All England Lawn Tennis and Croquet Club in Wimbledon, London, United Kingdom. The tournament ran from 26 June until 8 July. It was the 35th staging of the Wimbledon Championships, and the first Grand Slam tennis event of 1911.

The men's singles entry reached three figures, when 104 players entered the Challenge Round.

== Champions ==
=== Men's singles ===
(New Zealand) Anthony Wilding defeated (United Kingdom of Great Britain and Ireland) Herbert Roper Barrett 6–4, 4–6, 2–6, 6–2 retired

=== Women's singles ===
(United Kingdom of Great Britain and Ireland) Dorothea Lambert Chambers defeated (United Kingdom of Great Britain and Ireland) Dora Boothby 6–0, 6–0

=== Men's doubles ===
(France) Max Decugis / (France) André Gobert defeated (United Kingdom of Great Britain and Ireland) Major Ritchie / (New Zealand) Anthony Wilding 9–7, 5–7, 6–3, 2–6, 6–2

Preceded by 1910 U.S. National Championships	Grand Slams	Succeeded by 1911 U.S. National Championships
