= Harold Bache =

English cricketer and footballer

Personal information
- Full name: Harold Godfrey Bache
- Born: 20 April 1889; Churchill, Worcestershire, England
- Died: 15 February 1916 (aged 26) near Comines, Hainaut, Belgium
- Batting: Left-handed
- Bowling: Slow left arm orthodox

Career statistics
Competition	First-class
Matches	20
Runs scored	270
Batting average	9.00
100s/50s	0/0
Top score	36
Balls bowled	114
Wickets	3
Bowling average	13.00
5 wickets in innings	0
10 wickets in match	0
Best bowling	2/4
Catches/stumpings	6/–
- Source: CricketArchive, 10 October 2022

Harold Godfrey Bache (20 April 1889 – 15 February 1916) was an English cricketer. He played 20 first-class matches between 1907 and 1910, 17 of them for Worcestershire. He also played three times for Cambridge University, but was not awarded a Blue. He also played football to a high level, playing for Corinthian and West Bromwich Albion and winning an England Amateur cap.

Born in Churchill, Worcestershire, Bache was educated at King Edward VI School, Birmingham, and Caius College, Cambridge. He made his first-class debut for Worcestershire against Surrey at Worcester late in the 1907 season, scoring 9 in his only innings and holding three catches. The following season, he played twice for the county, but he made nine appearances in 1909 and eight in 1910. Mostly he played for Worcestershire but he turned out three times for Cambridge University.

His top score of 36 was made against Middlesex at Lord's in 1910. Later in the same season against the same opposition, but this time at Worcester, he took two of his three career wickets: those of Patsy Hendren and Jack Hearne. His other wicket had been that of Sussex's Robert Relf in 1909.

Bache joined the Lancashire Fusiliers and reached the rank of Second Lieutenant. He was killed by a sniper near the Comines Canal, West Flanders, Belgium at the age of 26. Having no known grave, he is commemorated on the Menin Gate Memorial.

== Corinthian F.C. ==
Bache played for the Corinthian 43 times, scoring 95 goals, giving him the best goals per game record for the club. In one notable feat, he scored 7 in the 13–0 victory over Ipswich on New Year's Eve, 1910. He excelled whilst on the club's famous tours and in 1911, took little mercy on his Canadian and American hosts, netting 34 goals in just 18 matches.
