= Otto Blom =

Dutch tennis player (1887–1972)

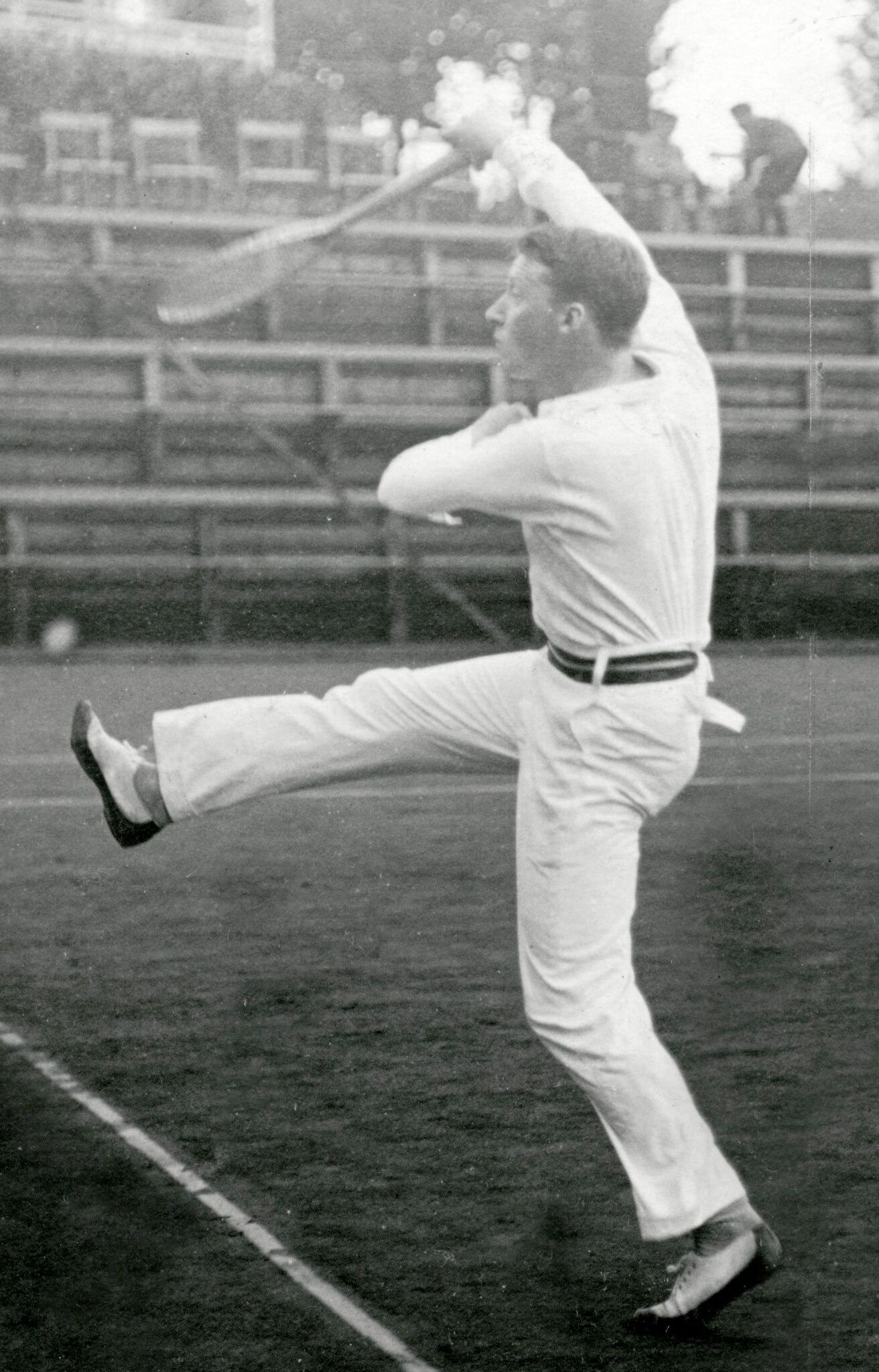
- Otto Blom (1912)
- Full name: Otto Pierre Nicolas Blom
- Country (sports): Netherlands
- Born: 19 March 1887 Amsterdam, Netherlands
- Died: 22 July 1972 (aged 85) Zeist, Netherlands
- Plays: Right-handed

Grand Slam singles results
- Wimbledon: 4R (1910)

Grand Slam doubles results
- Wimbledon: 2R (1910)

Otto Blom (19 March 1887 – 22 July 1972) was a Dutch tennis player. He competed for the Netherlands in the tennis event at the 1912 Summer Olympics where he took part in the men's singles competition. He lost in the first round to the Swede Carl Setterwall in three straight sets.

He won the singles title at the Dutch Tennis Championships in 1909, 1910 and 1911. At the same tournament he won the doubles title in 1909 and 1912 and the mixed doubles title in 1906 and 1911.

Blom participated in the Wimbledon Championships in 1909 and 1910. In 1909 he lost in the first round of the singles event to George Coulson and also lost in the first round of the doubles event. In 1910 he reached the fourth round in the singles event in which he lost to Arthur Lowe. In the doubles event he partnered Sirdar Nihal Singh and reached the second round.
