= Samuel Hardy (tennis) =

American tennis player (1876–1953)

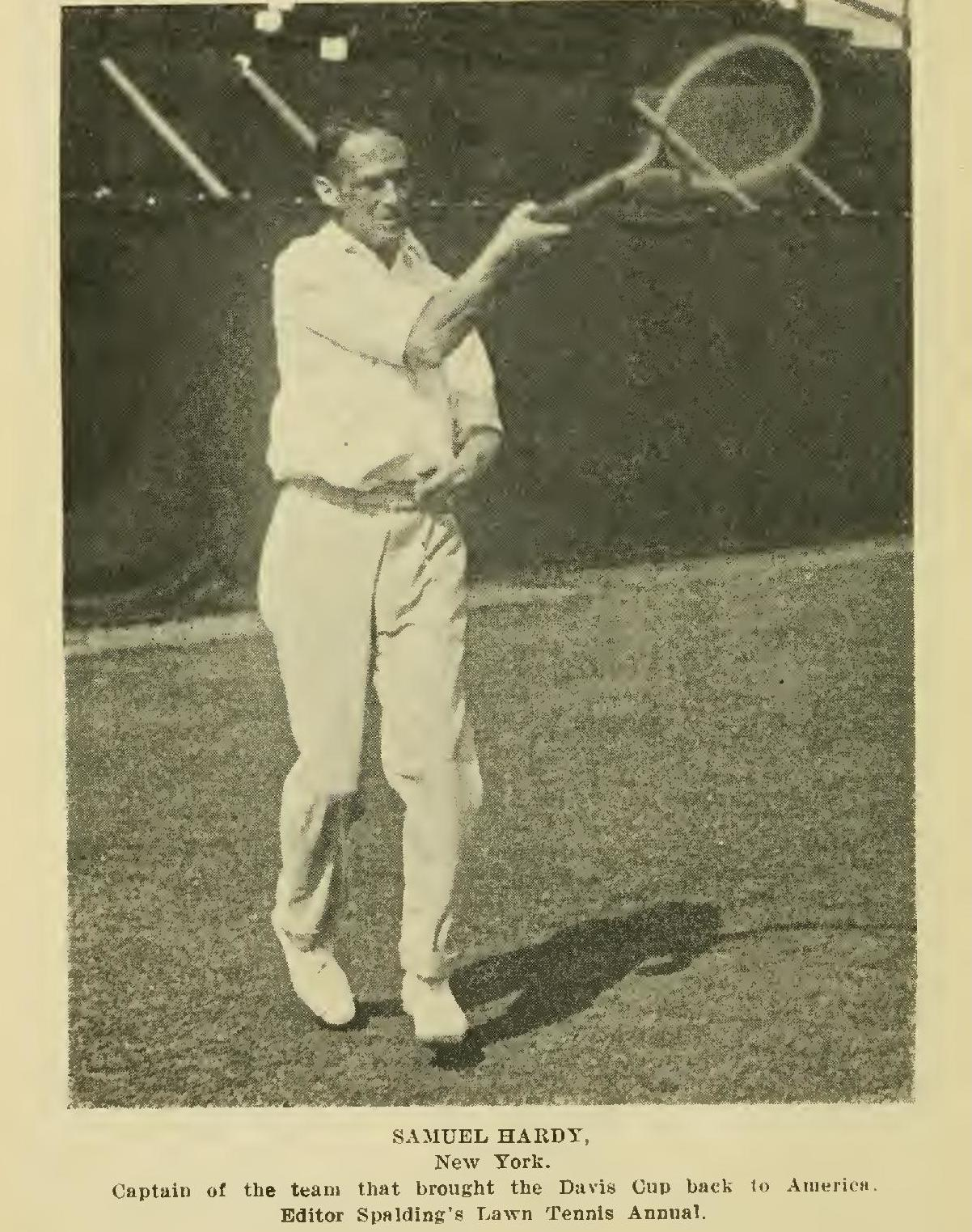
- Full name: Samuel Percy Hardy
- Country (sports): United States
- Born: November 23, 1876 Oakland, California, U.S.
- Died: January 25, 1953 (aged 76) Stamford, Connecticut, U.S.

Singles

Grand Slam singles results
- Wimbledon: 2R (1920)
- US Open: 3R (1920)

Doubles

Grand Slam doubles results
- Wimbledon: F (1911)

Samuel Percy Hardy (November 23, 1876 – January 25, 1953) was an American amateur tennis player.

A native of Oakland, California, Hardy picked up tennis aged 10 and was a four–time singles winner at the Pacific Coast Championships during the 1890s, before prioritising his studies.

Hardy initially attended Stanford University, graduating in 1902, then pursued a degree in medicine at the University of California. He practiced medicine in both California and Nevada for several years.

Leaving a career in medicine, Hardy decided in 1908 to focus on tennis and based himself for six years in England, where he worked as a real estate broker. He was a men's doubles (All–Comers) finalist at the 1911 Wimbledon Championships. In 1917, Hardy secured the U.S. Men's Clay Court Championships singles title at the late age of 40. He was non–playing captain of the 1920–Davis Cup winning United States team.
