= Hope Crisp =

English tennis player

- Country (sports): United Kingdom
- Born: 6 February 1884; Highgate, England
- Died: 25 March 1950 (aged 66); Roehampton, England

Singles

Grand Slam singles results
- Wimbledon: QF (1913)

Doubles

Grand Slam doubles results
- Wimbledon: SF (1914)

Mixed doubles

Grand Slam mixed doubles results
- Wimbledon: W (1913)

Hope Crisp (6 February 1884 – 25 March 1950), was an English tennis player. With Agnes Tuckey he was the first winner of the Wimbledon mixed doubles in 1913.

== Education ==
Educated at Queen Elizabeth's School, Barnet, he went up to St Catharine's College, Cambridge, where he captained the University of Cambridge tennis team.

== Tennis career ==
=== 1913 ===
In the 1913 Wimbledon Championships, he won with Agnes Tuckey the first mixed doubles final at Wimbledon in an unusual fashion - one of their opponents Ethel Thomson Larcombe was struck in the eye by her partner's miss-hit smash and unable to continue the match. The incident occurred when the second set was 5–3 for Crisp and Tuckey, the first having been won by the opposing pair of James Cecil Parke and Mrs Larcombe. In the 1914 Wimbledon Championships Crisp and Tuckey were the losing semi-finalists.

=== 1915 ===
During the First World War, he received a commission in The Duke of Wellington's (West Riding) Regiment. In April 1915 while attached to the Royal Warwickshire Regiment, he was wounded at Hill 60 near Ypres and his right leg was amputated.

=== 1919 ===
However, with a prosthesis, he returned to Wimbledon to play in the 1919 Championships with Mrs Perrett, losing in the second round after a bye in the first. The Times wrote; "It was interesting to see how he managed. He is a strong volleyer and naturally half volleys many balls which a two-legged player would drive. The artificial leg is the right; accordingly service is fairly easy and when there is no hurry, he walks with a fair speed, approaching a run. Other times, he hops. His cheerful temperament makes the game a real pleasure to himself and others."

=== 1923 ===
After the war, Captain Hope Crisp was employed as a Regional Awards Officer for the Ministry of Pensions; for this work he received an award of the OBE in 1923.

== Grand Slam finals ==
=== Mixed doubles (1 title) ===
Outcome	Year	Championship	Surface	Partner	Opponents	Score
Winner	1913	Wimbledon	Grass	(United Kingdom) Agnes Tuckey	(United Kingdom) James Parke (United Kingdom) Ethel Thomson Larcombe	6–3, 3–5 ret.
