= A. Wallis Myers =

British sports journalist (1878–1939)

Arthur Wallis Myers CBE
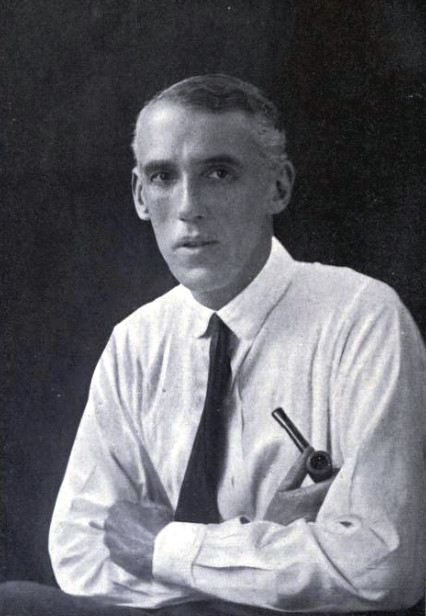
- Country (sports): United Kingdom
- Born: 24 July 1878 Kettering, England
- Died: 17 June 1939 (aged 60) Berrow, Epsom, England
- Turned pro: 1903 (amateur tour)
- Retired: 1926 (part-time afterwards)

Grand Slam singles results
- French Open: 2R (1926)
- Wimbledon: 2R (1921)
- US Open: 2R (1921)

Other tournaments
- WHCC: 3R (1921)
- WCCC: 1R (1919)

Grand Slam doubles results
- Wimbledon: QF (1908)

Grand Slam mixed doubles results
- Wimbledon: 1R (1914)

Other mixed doubles tournaments
- WHCC: SF (1914)

Arthur Wallis Myers CBE (24 July 1878 – 17 June 1939) was an English tennis correspondent, editor, author and player. He was one of the leading tennis journalists of the first half of the 20th century.

== Family life ==
Myers was son of the Rev. John Brown Myers, secretary of the Baptist Missionary Society, and Agnes Traphena (née Nutter). He attended the Watford Endowed School and The Leys School in Cambridge.

In 1900 Myers married Lilian Gentry, daughter of Captain George Gentry, of Maldon, Essex. The couple had seven children, the youngest of whom, Prue, wrote a tribute to her father entitled A. Wallis Myers: A testament to tennis.

== Playing career ==
He was a keen tennis player himself and was active mainly in amateur doubles competition. In April 1906 he won the doubles title with New Zealander Anthony Wilding at the Championships of Barcelona. He also won the Monte Carlo doubles championship in 1910 and 1921.

In mixed doubles competition, Myers competed at Monte Carlo in 1909 and later at the 1914 World Hard Court Championships with Phyllis Satterthwaite, reaching the semi-finals. He also teamed up with Molla Bjurstedt Mallory for the 1923 Monte Carlo tournament.

Also in 1923 he won the doubles title at the South of France Championships. He was the captain of British tennis teams on tour in Europe, South Africa and India.

== Journalism ==
Myers was the editor of the Ayres' Lawn Tennis Almanack and Tournament Guide beginning in 1908. The following year he began work as the lawn tennis correspondent of The Daily Telegraph, a position he held until his death in 1939. He also served as lawn tennis editor of The Field and he wrote several books on tennis including a biography of four-time Wimbledon champion Anthony Wilding who was killed in the First World War. During that war Myers served in the Ministry of Information.

In 1924 he founded the International Lawn Tennis Club of Great Britain with Lord Balfour, former Prime Minister and later a Member of the Cabinet, as its first President.

== Honours ==
Myers was appointed Commander of the Order of the British Empire (CBE) in the 1920 New Year Honours, dated 30 March 1920, for his work at the Ministry of Information.

He was appointed Chevalier (Knight) of the Legion of Honour by French President Paul Doumer on 29 April 1932 for his service to the game of tennis.

== Bibliography ==
- Lawn tennis at home and abroad (1903) (online)
- The complete lawn tennis player (1908) (online)
- Leaders of lawn tennis (1912) (online)
- C.B. Fry : the man and his methods (1912)
- The story of the Davis Cup (1913)
- Captain Anthony Wilding (1916) (online)
- Twenty years of lawn tennis : some personal memories (1921) (online)
- Fifty years of Wimbledon : the story of the lawn tennis championships (1926)
- Lawn tennis, its principles & practice: a player's guide to modern methods (1930)
- Memory's parade (1932)
