= Percival Davson =

British sportsman

- Full name: Percival May Davson
- Country (sports): United Kingdom
- Born: 30 September 1877 Demerara, British Guiana
- Died: 5 December 1959 (aged 82) Paddington, London, England
- Turned pro: 1906 (amateur tour)
- Retired: 1926

Singles
- Highest ranking: No. 8 (1919, A. Wallis Myers)

Grand Slam singles results
- Wimbledon: QF (1914, 1922)

Other tournaments
- WHCC: 1R (1920)

Grand Slam doubles results
- Wimbledon: SF (1920)

Other doubles tournaments
- WCCC: W (1920)

Grand Slam mixed doubles results
- Wimbledon: QF (1921)

Team competitions
- Davis Cup: F (1919^{Ch})
Medal record
Men's fencing
Representing United Kingdom
Olympic Games
Silver medal – second place	1912 Stockholm	Épée, team

Percival May Davson (30 September 1877 – 5 December 1959) was a British fencer and tennis player. He won a silver medal in the team épée event at the 1912 Summer Olympics. He also competed in the Davis Cup in 1919.

In April 1913, Percival won the singles title at the British Covered Court Championships, defeating Erik Larsen in the final in four sets.

Davson was ranked world No. 8 in 1919 by A. Wallis Myers of The Daily Telegraph. He reached the Wimbledon quarter finals in 1914 (losing to Alfred Beamish) and 1922 (losing to Randolph Lycett).

== World Championships finals ==
=== Doubles: (1 title) ===
Result	Year	Championship	Surface	Partner	Opponents	Score
Win	1920	World Covered Court Championships	Wood	(United Kingdom) Theodore Mavrogordato	(United Kingdom) Alfred Beamish (New Zealand) Frank Fisher	4–6, 10–8, 13–11, 3–6, 6–3
