= Herbert Roper Barrett =

English tennis player

Herbert Barrett
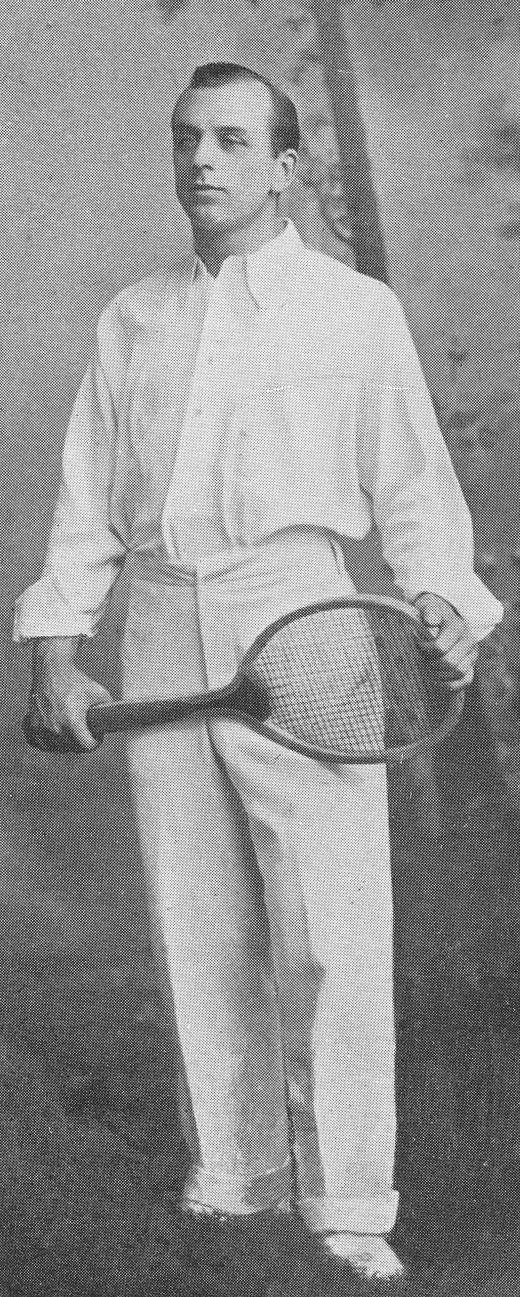
- Full name: Herbert Roper Barrett
- Country (sports): United Kingdom
- Born: 24 November 1873 Upton, Essex, England
- Died: 27 July 1943 (aged 69) Horsham, Sussex, England

Singles
- Career record: 332–58 (85.13%)
- Career titles: 51

Grand Slam singles results
- Wimbledon: F (1908^{AC}, 1909^{AC}, 1911^{Ch})

Doubles
- Career record: 0–0

Grand Slam doubles results
- Wimbledon: W (1909, 1912, 1913)
Medal record
Men's Tennis
Gold medal – first place	1908 London	Indoor doubles
Silver medal – second place	1912 Stockholm	Indoor mixed doubles

Herbert Roper Barrett, KC (24 November 1873 – 27 July 1943) was a tennis player from Great Britain.

== Biography ==
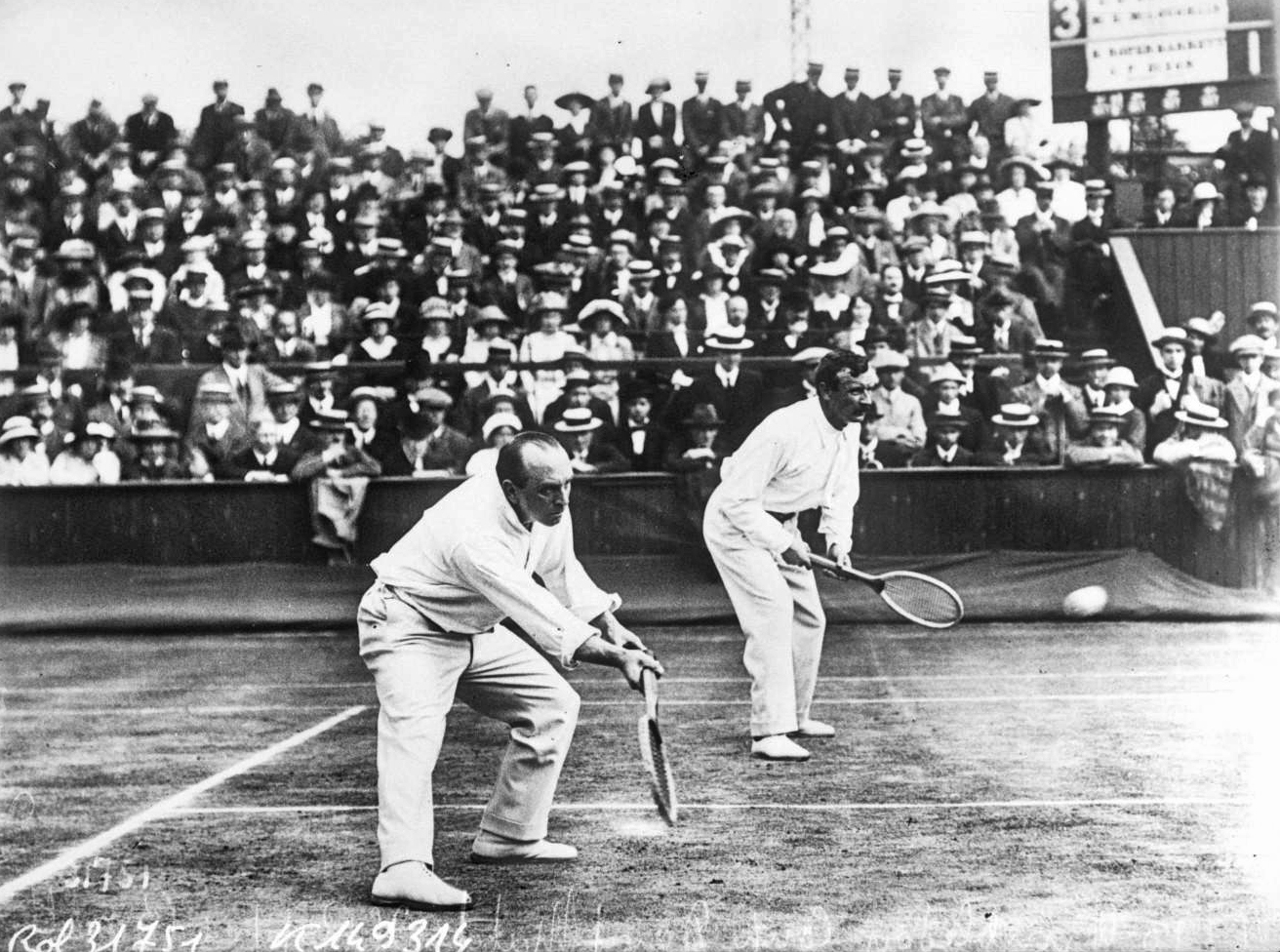
Roper Barrett with C.P. Dixon in the 1913 Davis Cup

Barrett was born on 24 November 1873 in Upton, Essex.

At the London Olympics in 1908 Barrett and Arthur Gore won a gold medal in the men's indoor doubles event. They also won the doubles in Wimbledon in 1909. In 1912 and 1913 he won the Wimbledon doubles with Charles Dixon.

He played his first Wimbledon singles competition in 1898, reaching the second round in which he lost to eventual finalist Laurence Doherty. In 1908 he reached the All comers final, beating Anthony Wilding and Major Ritchie before losing in five sets to former doubles partner Arthur Gore. In 1909 he beat James Cecil Parke and Friedrich Rahe before losing to Ritchie in the all comers final. He achieved his best Wimbledon singles result in 1911 when he beat Parke and Gordon Lowe before winning the All-Comers final against compatriot Charles P. Dixon. In the Challenge Round against Anthony Wilding from New Zealand, Roper Barrett had to retire at the start of the fifth set. Over the following years he would make regular appearances at Wimbledon until 1921.

He participated in the first Davis Cup in 1900 and was the non-playing captain of the winning British Davis Cup team in 1933.

His most successful tournament wins were at the Suffolk Championships at Saxmundham which he won 17 times between 1898 and 1921; he reached 18 finals there and won the tournament 14 consecutive times between 1904 and 1921, all three achievements are all-time records at a single tournament. He won the Essex Championships 13 times (1897–1898, 1899, 1901, 1906, 1908, 1910, 1912), and also won the East of England Championships 6 times (1897–1899, 1901–1902, 1910).

He died on 27 July 1943.

== Grand Slam finals ==
=== Singles (2 runner-ups) ===
Result	Year	Championship	Surface	Opponent	Score
Loss	1908	Wimbledon	Grass	(United Kingdom of Great Britain and Ireland) Arthur Gore	3–6, 2–6, 6–4, 6–3, 4–6
Loss	1911	Wimbledon	Grass	(Australia) Anthony Wilding	4–6, 6–4, 6–2, 2–6 ret.

=== Doubles (3 titles, 3 runner-ups) ===
Result	Year	Championship	Surface	Partner	Opponents	Score
Loss	1908	Wimbledon	Grass	(United Kingdom of Great Britain and Ireland) Arthur Gore	(United Kingdom of Great Britain and Ireland) Major Ritchie (Australia) Anthony Wilding	1–6, 2–6, 1–6, 7–9
Win	1909	Wimbledon	Grass	(United Kingdom of Great Britain and Ireland) Arthur Gore	(Australia) Stanley Doust (New Zealand) Harry Parker	6–2, 6–1, 6–4
Loss	1910	Wimbledon	Grass	(United Kingdom of Great Britain and Ireland) Arthur Gore	(United Kingdom of Great Britain and Ireland) Major Ritchie (Australia) Anthony Wilding	1–6, 1–6, 2–6
Win	1912	Wimbledon	Grass	(United Kingdom of Great Britain and Ireland) Charles P. Dixon	(France) Max Decugis (France) André Gobert	3–6, 6–3, 6–4, 7–5
Win	1913	Wimbledon	Grass	(United Kingdom of Great Britain and Ireland) Charles P. Dixon	(Germany) Heinrich Kleinschroth (Germany) Friedrich Wilhelm Rahe	6–2, 6–4, 4–6, 6–2
Loss	1914	Wimbledon	Grass	(United Kingdom of Great Britain and Ireland) Charles P. Dixon	(Australia) Norman Brookes (Australia) Anthony Wilding	1–6, 1–6, 7–5, 6–8
