= Stanley Doust =

Australian tennis player

Stan Doust
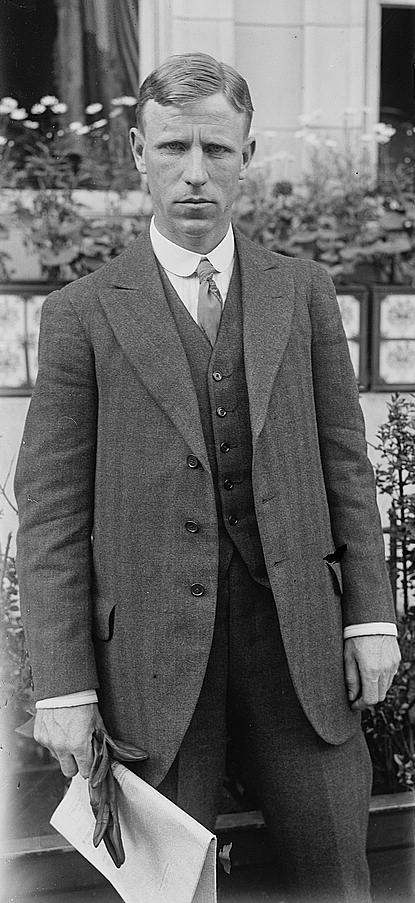
- Full name: Stanley Norwood Doust
- Country (sports): Australia
- Born: 29 March 1878; Sydney, Australia
- Died: 13 December 1961 (aged 83); London, England
- Height: 171 cm (5 ft 7 1/2 in)
- Turned pro: 1904 (amateur tour)
- Retired: 1923
- Plays: Right-handed (one-handed backhand)
- College: Newington College

Singles
- Career record: 266-120 (68.9%)
- Career titles: 17
- Highest ranking: No. 8 (1913, A. Wallis Myers)

Grand Slam singles results
- Australian Open: QF (1908)
- Wimbledon: F (1913^{(AC)})

Other tournaments
- WHCC: 2R (1923)
- WCCC: SF (1920)

Doubles

Grand Slam doubles results
- Wimbledon: F (1909)

Mixed doubles

Grand Slam mixed doubles results
- Wimbledon: 3R (1913, 1919)

Stanley Norwood Doust (29 March 1878 – 13 December 1961) was an Australian-born tennis player who captained his nation's Davis Cup team and was winner of the Mixed Doubles Trophy at Wimbledon.

== Early years ==
Doust was born in Newtown, New South Wales, the only son of Isaac Doust, landowner and property developer, and his wife Lucy Ellen (née Dunlop). His elder sister was Edith Lucy Doust (1875–1947), who married Harry Wolstenholme and was an early female graduate at the University of Sydney and tennis player. Living in Marrickville and Wyroolah Dulwich Hill, Doust was educated at Newington College commencing in 1887 at the age of eight. On 18 August 1903, at the Presbyterian Church in Petersham, he married Dorothy Mary Storer.

== Tennis career ==
Doust played in the Australian Open in 1907 and 1908. In 1909 he played Wimbledon in doubles with Harry Parker. In 1913 he was defeated at Wimbledon by Maurice Evans McLoughlin. in the same year he captained the Australian Davis Cup team that won against the United States team with McLoughlin in it. His last major title win was the 1926 British Covered Court Championships mixed championship where he played with Joan Ridley. In his obituary in The Times he is described as; "One of the last of the world's great 'dolly' servers and particularly nimble about the court, he was seen at his best in doubles matches ... he used a well-placed, low-bouncing service that forced his opponent to hit upwards while [he] moved in to volley."

A. Wallis Myers of The Daily Telegraph ranked Doust as world No. 8 in 1913.

=== Grand Slam finals ===
==== Doubles (1 runner-up) ====
Result	Year	Championship	urface	Partner	Opponents	Score
Loss	1909	Wimbledon	Grass	(New Zealand) Harry Parker	(United Kingdom of Great Britain and Ireland) Arthur Gore (United Kingdom) Herbert Roper Barrett	2–6, 1–6, 4–6

== World War I ==
Doust served as a lieutenant during World War I.

== Journalist ==
For 31 years from 1920, Doust was the lawn tennis correspondent for the Daily Mail. He died in a London hospital aged 83.
