= Augustus Hendriks =

British tennis player

- Full name: Augustus Mark Hendriks
- Country (sports): (United Kingdom) Great Britain
- Died: 25 February 1915 near Ypres ,Belgium

Grand Slam singles results
- Wimbledon: 3R (1910)

Grand Slam doubles results
- Wimbledon: SF (1913)

Augustus Mark Hendriks (c. 1881 – 25 May 1915) was a British amateur tennis player.

The son of an actuary, Hendriks attended Rugby School from 1894 to 1897.

Hendriks served with the Paget's Horse in the Second Boer War.

A member of the Queen's Club, Hendriks competed in six editions of the Wimbledon Championships. He had his best singles performance in 1910, when he made the third round for the only time, and was a men's doubles semi-finalist in 1913, partnering with Walter Crawley.

Hendriks served with the Royal Fusiliers and West Yorkshire Regiment in World War I. He was killed in action during fighting near Ypres in 1915 and is commemorated at the Ploegsteert Memorial.
