= 1914 Wimbledon Championships – Mixed doubles =

Mixed doubles
- 1914 Wimbledon Championships

Final
- Champions: (United Kingdom) James Cecil Parke (United Kingdom) Ethel Larcombe
- Runners-up: (New Zealand) Anthony Wilding (France) Marguerite Broquedis
- Score: 4–6, 6–4, 6–2

Details
- Draw: 39
- Seeds: –

Events
Singles	men	women		boys	girls
Doubles	men	women	mixed	boys	girls
← 1913 ·	Wimbledon Championships	· 1919 →

Hope Crisp and Agnes Tuckey were the defending champions, but they lost in the semifinals to eventual champions James Cecil Parke and Ethel Larcombe.

Parke and Larcombe defeated Anthony Wilding and Marguerite Broquedis in the final, 4–6, 6–4, 6–2 to win the mixed doubles tennis title at the 1914 Wimbledon Championships.

== Draw ==
=== Key ===
- Q = Qualifier
- WC = Wild card
- LL = Lucky loser
- Alt = Alternate
- SE = Special exempt
- PR = Protected ranking
- ITF = ITF entry
- JE = Junior exempt
- w/o = Walkover
- r = Retired
- d = Defaulted
- SR = Special ranking

=== Finals ===
Quarterfinals
(United Kingdom) Harold Aitken (United Kingdom) Edith Hannam	7	6
(United Kingdom) GTC Watt (United Kingdom) Beryl Tulloch	5	2
(United Kingdom) LF Davin (United Kingdom) GB Palmer	1	6
(New Zealand) Anthony Wilding (France) Marguerite Broquedis	6	8
(United Kingdom) James Cecil Parke (United Kingdom) Ethel Larcombe	6	7
(France) Max Decugis (United States) Elizabeth Ryan	4	5
(United Kingdom) Charles Dixon (United Kingdom) Madeline O'Neill	4	5
(United Kingdom) Hope Crisp (United Kingdom) Agnes Tuckey	6	7

Semifinals
(United Kingdom) Harold Aitken (United Kingdom) Edith Hannam	3	6	3
(New Zealand) Anthony Wilding (France) Marguerite Broquedis	6	4	6
(United Kingdom) James Cecil Parke (United Kingdom) Ethel Larcombe	4	6	6
(United Kingdom) Hope Crisp (United Kingdom) Agnes Tuckey	6	2	2

Final
(New Zealand) Anthony Wilding (France) Marguerite Broquedis	6	4	2
(United Kingdom) James Cecil Parke (United Kingdom) Ethel Larcombe	4	6	6

=== Top half ===
==== Section 1 ====
First round

Second round
(United Kingdom) Harold Aitken (United Kingdom) Edith Hannam	6	2	6
(United Kingdom) William Clements (United Kingdom) Jessie Greene	3	6	4
(United Kingdom) Albert Prebble (United Kingdom) Charlotte Sterry	6	6
(United Kingdom) Roderick McNair (United Kingdom) Winifred McNair	3	4
(United Kingdom) GTC Watt (United Kingdom) Beryl Tulloch
(United Kingdom) Neville Willford (United Kingdom) Susannah Willford	w/o
(United Kingdom) Theodore Mavrogordato (United Kingdom) Mabel Parton
(United States) Craig Biddle (United Kingdom) Betty Crundall Punnett	w/o

Third round
(United Kingdom) H Aitken (United Kingdom) E Hannam	2	7	7
(United Kingdom) A Prebble (United Kingdom) C Sterry	6	5	5
(United Kingdom) GTC Watt (United Kingdom) B Tulloch	2	6	6
(United Kingdom) T Mavrogordato (United Kingdom) M Parton	6	4	1

Quarterfinals
(United Kingdom) H Aitken (United Kingdom) E Hannam	7	6
(United Kingdom) GTC Watt (United Kingdom) B Tulloch	5	2

==== Section 2 ====
First round
(United Kingdom) JB Ward (United Kingdom) Mrs Armstrong	3	6	7
(United Kingdom) Charles Simond (United Kingdom) Vera Spofforth	6	3	5
(United Kingdom) RWF Harding (United Kingdom) Mrs RWF Harding	6	3	6
(United Kingdom) AJ Jimenez (United Kingdom) Mabel Davy	3	6	4
(New Zealand) Anthony Wilding (France) Marguerite Broquedis	6	6
(United Kingdom) TD Stoward (United Kingdom) CM Douglass	1	1
(Australia) Stanley Doust (United Kingdom) Agnes Morton	6	6
(Australia) Alfred Dunlop (United Kingdom) Helen Aitchison	4	3

Second round
(South Africa) Newton Thompson (United Kingdom) Mrs WH Holloway	4	6	9
(United Kingdom) Sydney Watts (United Kingdom) Doris Craddock	6	4	7
(United Kingdom) LF Davin (United Kingdom) GB Palmer
(United Kingdom) AL Baker (United Kingdom) Mrs AL Baker	w/o
(United Kingdom) JB Ward (United Kingdom) Mrs Armstrong	8	2	3
(United Kingdom) RWF Harding (United Kingdom) Mrs RWF Harding	6	6	6
(New Zealand) A Wilding (France) M Broquedis	7	6	6
(Australia) S Doust (United Kingdom) A Morton	5	8	3

Third round
(South Africa) N Thompson (United Kingdom) Mrs WH Holloway	4	6	4
(United Kingdom) LF Davin (United Kingdom) GB Palmer	6	3	6
(United Kingdom) RWF Harding (United Kingdom) Mrs RWF Harding	1	5
(New Zealand) A Wilding (France) M Broquedis	6	7

Quarterfinals
(United Kingdom) LF Davin (United Kingdom) GB Palmer	1	6
(New Zealand) A Wilding (France) M Broquedis	6	8

=== Bottom half ===
==== Section 3 ====
First round
(United Kingdom) A Moss (United Kingdom) Mrs A Mitchell	6	3	6
(United Kingdom) HE Evers (United Kingdom) Mrs GC Hampton	2	6	3
(United Kingdom) Evan Gwynne-Evans (United Kingdom) Dorothy Holman	6	3	6
(United Kingdom) George Thomas (United Kingdom) Hazel Hogarth	3	6	4
(United Kingdom) James Cecil Parke (United Kingdom) Ethel Larcombe	7	6
(United Kingdom) A. Wallis Myers (United Kingdom) Phyllis Satterthwaite	5	3

Second round
(United Kingdom) A Moss (United Kingdom) Mrs A Mitchell	2	2
(United Kingdom) E Gwynne-Evans (United Kingdom) D Holman	6	6
(United Kingdom) JC Parke (United Kingdom) E Larcombe	6	6
(United Kingdom) Humphrey Milford (United Kingdom) Mrs HV Parbury	0	2
(United Kingdom) Algernon Kingscote (United Kingdom) Dorothea Lambert Chambers	6	6
(United Kingdom) LS Lee (United Kingdom) BMS Lee	4	0
(France) Max Decugis (United States) Elizabeth Ryan	6	6
(United Kingdom) Peter Hicks (United Kingdom) Miss Baldwin	1	4

Third round
(United Kingdom) E Gwynne-Evans (United Kingdom) D Holman	3	4
(United Kingdom) JC Parke (United Kingdom) E Larcombe	6	6
(United Kingdom) A Kingscote (United Kingdom) D Lambert Chambers	1	4
(France) M Decugis (United States) E Ryan	6	6

Quarterfinals
(United Kingdom) JC Parke (United Kingdom) E Larcombe	6	7
(France) M Decugis (United States) E Ryan	4	5

==== Section 4 ====
First round

Second round
(United Kingdom) Alfred Beamish (United Kingdom) Winifred Beamish
(United Kingdom) Percy Pinckney (United Kingdom) Violet Pinckney	w/o
(United Kingdom) Charles Dixon (United Kingdom) Madeline O'Neill	6	6
(United Kingdom) AJ Ross (United Kingdom) Edith Johnson	1	4
(Belgium) Paul de Borman (United Kingdom) P Millard
(United Kingdom) CH Martin (United Kingdom) Mrs C Martin	w/o
(United Kingdom) Hope Crisp (United Kingdom) Agnes Tuckey	6	1	6
(United Kingdom) FCG Fison (United Kingdom) ML Fison	1	6	4

Third round
(United Kingdom) A Beamish (United Kingdom) W Beamish	6	0	4
(United Kingdom) C Dixon (United Kingdom) M O'Neill	4	6	6
(Belgium) P de Borman (United Kingdom) P Millard	3	0
(United Kingdom) H Crisp (United Kingdom) A Tuckey	6	6

Quarterfinals
(United Kingdom) C Dixon (United Kingdom) M O'Neill	4	5
(United Kingdom) H Crisp (United Kingdom) A Tuckey	6	7
