= 1920 Wimbledon Championships – Mixed doubles =

Mixed doubles
- 1920 Wimbledon Championships

Final
- Champions: (Australia) Gerald Patterson (France) Suzanne Lenglen
- Runners-up: (Australia) Randolph Lycett (United States) Elizabeth Ryan
- Score: 7-5, 6-3

Details
- Draw: 52
- Seeds: –

Events
Singles	men	women		boys	girls
Doubles	men	women	mixed	boys	girls
← 1919 ·	Wimbledon Championships	· 1921 →

Gerald Patterson and Suzanne Lenglen defeated defending champions Randolph Lycett and Elizabeth Ryan in the final, 7–5, 6–3 to win the mixed doubles tennis title at the 1920 Wimbledon Championships.

== Draw ==
=== Key ===
- Q = Qualifier
- WC = Wild card
- LL = Lucky loser
- Alt = Alternate
- SE = Special exempt
- PR = Protected ranking
- ITF = ITF entry
- JE = Junior exempt
- w/o = Walkover
- r = Retired
- d = Defaulted
- SR = Special ranking

=== Finals ===
Quarterfinals
(United Kingdom) Alfred Beamish (United Kingdom) Winifred Beamish	4	6	6
(United Kingdom) JB Ward (United Kingdom) Mrs Armstrong	6	1	2
(Australia) Gerald Patterson (France) Suzanne Lenglen	6	7
(Japan) Zenzo Shimizu (United Kingdom) Dorothea Lambert Chambers	2	5
(Australia) Randolph Lycett (United States) Elizabeth Ryan	6	6
(South Africa) Gerald Sherwell (United Kingdom) Kitty McKane	4	3
(United Kingdom) Theodore Mavrogordato (United Kingdom) Mabel Parton	2	2
(South Africa) Brian Norton (United Kingdom) Ethel Larcombe	6	6

Semifinals
(United Kingdom) Alfred Beamish (United Kingdom) Winifred Beamish	1	4
(Australia) Gerald Patterson (France) Suzanne Lenglen	6	6
(Australia) Randolph Lycett (United States) Elizabeth Ryan	6	6
(South Africa) Brian Norton (United Kingdom) Ethel Larcombe	3	4

Final
(Australia) Gerald Patterson (France) Suzanne Lenglen	7	6
(Australia) Randolph Lycett (United States) Elizabeth Ryan	5	3

=== Top half ===
==== Section 1 ====
First round
(United Kingdom) Beverley Covell (United Kingdom) Mrs FS Warburg	2	2
(United Kingdom) JB Ward (United Kingdom) Mrs R Armstrong	6	6
(United Kingdom) Humphrey Milford (United Kingdom) Mrs HV Parbury	6	6
(France) Jacques Brugnon (France) Marie Decugis	1	2

Second round
(United Kingdom) HJ Gilbert (United Kingdom) IE Ward	7	6
(United Kingdom) Dan Hanbury (Australia) Miss O'Hara Wood	5	0
(United Kingdom) Alfred Beamish (United Kingdom) Winifred Beamish	6	6
(United Kingdom) N Field (United Kingdom) OliveManser	4	2
(United Kingdom) Ernest Lamb (United Kingdom) Aurea Edgington	3	6	6
(United Kingdom) Alfred Hunter (United Kingdom) Madeline O'Neill	6	4	8
(United Kingdom) JB Ward (United Kingdom) Mrs R Armstrong	6	6
(United Kingdom) H Milford (United Kingdom) Mrs HV Parbury	2	3

Third round
(United Kingdom) HJ Gilbert (United Kingdom) IE Ward	1	4
(United Kingdom) A Beamish (United Kingdom) W Beamish	6	6
(United Kingdom) A Hunter (United Kingdom) M O'Neill	4	2
(United Kingdom) JB Ward (United Kingdom) Mrs R Armstrong	6	6

Quarterfinals
(United Kingdom) A Beamish (United Kingdom) W Beamish	4	6	6
(United Kingdom) JB Ward (United Kingdom) Mrs R Armstrong	6	1	2

==== Section 2 ====
First round
(South Africa) Charles Winslow (South Africa) Olive Winslow	6	3	4
(Australia) Stanley Doust (United Kingdom) Winifred McNair	3	6	6
(United Kingdom) Jack Hillyard (United Kingdom) Phyllis Satterthwaite	4	6	6
(United Kingdom) Vincent Burr (United Kingdom) Evelyn Colyer	6	4	4
(United States) Chuck Garland (United States) Molla Mallory
(United Kingdom) PE Harrison (United Kingdom) Mrs CE Hunter	w/o
(Australia) Gerald Patterson (France) Suzanne Lenglen	6	6
(United Kingdom) Herbert Roper Barrett (Australia) Sylvia Lance	3	0
(United Kingdom) GTC Watt (United Kingdom) Mrs HA Davis	5	0
(New Zealand) Frank Fisher (United Kingdom) Agnes Tuckey	7	6
(Japan) Zenzo Shimizu (United Kingdom) Dorothea Lambert Chambers	6	6
(United Kingdom) RH Hotham (United Kingdom) Mrs LH Wimble	2	0
(United Kingdom) Maurice Blythman; Mrs M Blythman	1	2
(South Africa) Cecil Blackbeard (United Kingdom) Dorothy Kemmis-Betty	6	6
(United Kingdom) John Cecil Masterman (United Kingdom) Norah Middleton	w/o
(United Kingdom) Ambrose Dudley (United Kingdom) Phyllis Howkins

Second round
(Australia) S Doust (United Kingdom) W McNair	5	6	4
(United Kingdom) J Hillyard (United Kingdom) P Satterthwaite	7	1	6
(United States) C Garland (United States) M Mallory	0	3
(Australia) G Patterson (France) S Lenglen	6	6
(New Zealand) F Fisher (United Kingdom) A Tuckey	2	4
(Japan) Z Shimizu (United Kingdom) D Lambert Chambers	6	6
(South Africa) C Blackbeard (United Kingdom) D Kemmis-Betty	5	6
(United Kingdom) A Dudley (United Kingdom) P Howkins	7	8

Third round
(United Kingdom) J Hillyard (United Kingdom) P Satterthwaite	2	1
(Australia) G Patterson (France) S Lenglen	6	6
(Japan) Z Shimizu (United Kingdom) D Lambert Chambers	6	6
(United Kingdom) A Dudley (United Kingdom) P Howkins	3	4

Quarterfinals
(Australia) G Patterson (France) S Lenglen	6	7
(Japan) Z Shimizu (United Kingdom) D Lambert Chambers	2	5

The nationality of Mrs M Blythman is unknown.

=== Bottom half ===
==== Section 3 ====
First round
(United Kingdom) Leonard Lyle (United Kingdom) Helen Leisk	6	6
(United Kingdom) BW Vane Percy (United Kingdom) Mrs DK Hole	1	3
(United Kingdom) CW Murray (United Kingdom) Vera Youle	2	1
(France) William Laurentz (United Kingdom) Dorothy Holman	6	6
(United Kingdom) Albert Prebble (United Kingdom) Dora Geen	3	2
(Australia) Randolph Lycett (United States) Elizabeth Ryan	6	6
(United Kingdom) Leslie Godfree (United Kingdom) Peggy Dransfield
(United Kingdom) HD Marshall (India) Mrs EH Berthoud	w/o
(United Kingdom) Robert Walker (United Kingdom) Mrs RC Cole	6	6
(United Kingdom) Lister; AL Lister	2	1
(Netherlands) Christiaan van Lennep (Netherlands) Grace van Lennep	w/o
(United Kingdom) EA Stoner; Mme Paravicini
(South Africa) Gerald Sherwell (United Kingdom) Kitty McKane	5	6	7
(United Kingdom) Charles Dixon (United Kingdom) Mrs Rowand Harker	7	2	5
(United Kingdom) Alfred Ingram (United Kingdom) Doris Craddock	2	6	6
(United Kingdom) Hew Stoker (United Kingdom) Gladys Lamplough	6	4	2

Second round
(United Kingdom) L Lyle (United Kingdom) H Leisk	5	5
(France) W Laurentz (United Kingdom) D Holman	7	7
(Australia) R Lycett (United States) E Ryan	6	6
(United Kingdom) L Godfree (United Kingdom) P Dransfield	1	2
(United Kingdom) R Walker (United Kingdom) Mrs RC Cole	5	11	6
(United Kingdom) EA Stoner; Mme Paravicini	7	9	0
(South Africa) G Sherwell (United Kingdom) K McKane	3	6	6
(United Kingdom) A Ingram (United Kingdom) D Craddock	6	1	2

Third round
(France) W Laurentz (United Kingdom) D Holman	3	2
(Australia) R Lycett (United States) E Ryan	6	6
(United Kingdom) R Walker (United Kingdom) Mrs RC Cole	2	0
(South Africa) G Sherwell (United Kingdom) K McKane	6	6

Quarterfinals
(Australia) R Lycett (United States) E Ryan	6	6
(South Africa) G Sherwell (United Kingdom) K McKane	4	3

The nationalities of Miss AL Lister and Mme Paravicini is unknown.

==== Section 4 ====
First round
(United Kingdom) LF Davin (United Kingdom) MB Holmes	6	3
(United Kingdom) Theodore Mavrogordato (United Kingdom) Mabel Parton	8	6
(United Kingdom) George Stoddart (United Kingdom) DS Holmes	3	1
(United Kingdom) George Thomas (United Kingdom) Hazel Hogarth	6	6

Second round
(United Kingdom) T Mavrogordato (United Kingdom) M Parton	6	4	6
(United Kingdom) G Thomas (United Kingdom) H Hogarth	1	6	4
(United Kingdom) Alex Drew (United Kingdom) Eleanor Rose	6	3	6
(United Kingdom) Frank Jarvis (United Kingdom) Dorothy Shepherd	3	6	2
(United Kingdom) Donald Kingdon (United Kingdom) Mrs D Kingdon	1	4
(South Africa) Brian Norton (United Kingdom) Ethel Larcombe	6	6
(United Kingdom) Neville Willford (United Kingdom) Edith Johnson	4	6	5
(France) André Gobert; Mme AH Gobert	6	3	7

Third round
(United Kingdom) T Mavrogordato (United Kingdom) M Parton	6	6
(United Kingdom) A Drew (United Kingdom) E Rose	2	4
(South Africa) B Norton (United Kingdom) E Larcombe	6	6
(France) A Gobert; Mme AH Gobert	2	1

Quarterfinals
(United Kingdom) T Mavrogordato (United Kingdom) M Parton	2	2
(South Africa) B Norton (United Kingdom) E Larcombe	6	6

The nationality of Mme AH Gobert is unknown.
