= 1913 Wimbledon Championships – Mixed doubles =

Mixed doubles
- 1913 Wimbledon Championships

Final
- Champions: (United Kingdom) Hope Crisp (United Kingdom) Agnes Tuckey
- Runners-up: (United Kingdom) James Cecil Parke (United Kingdom) Ethel Larcombe
- Score: 3–6, 5–3 retired

Details
- Draw: 41
- Seeds: –

Events
Singles	men	women		boys	girls
Doubles	men	women	mixed	boys	girls
Wimbledon Championships	· 1914 →

Hope Crisp and Agnes Tuckey defeated James Cecil Parke and Ethel Larcombe in the final, 3–6, 5–3 retired to win the inaugural Mixed Doubles tennis title at the 1913 Wimbledon Championships.

== Draw ==
=== Key ===
- Q = Qualifier
- WC = Wild card
- LL = Lucky loser
- Alt = Alternate
- SE = Special exempt
- PR = Protected ranking
- ITF = ITF entry
- JE = Junior exempt
- w/o = Walkover
- r = Retired
- d = Defaulted
- SR = Special ranking

=== Finals ===
Quarterfinals
(United Kingdom) FF Roe (United Kingdom) Dorothy Holman	3	3
(United Kingdom) Theodore Mavrogordato (United Kingdom) Mabel Parton	6	6
(United Kingdom) James Cecil Parke (United Kingdom) Ethel Larcombe	6	6
(United Kingdom) Herbert Roper Barrett (United Kingdom) Agnes Morton	2	2
(United Kingdom) Charles Dixon (United Kingdom) Edith Hannam	6	4	4
(United Kingdom) Norman Kidson (United Kingdom) Madeline O'Neill	3	6	6
(United Kingdom) Hope Crisp (United Kingdom) Agnes Tuckey	6	3	6
(United Kingdom) Roderick McNair (United Kingdom) Winifred McNair	2	6	4

Semifinals
(United Kingdom) Theodore Mavrogordato (United Kingdom) Mabel Parton	3	4
(United Kingdom) James Cecil Parke (United Kingdom) Ethel Larcombe	6	6
(United Kingdom) Norman Kidson (United Kingdom) Madeline O'Neill	2	3
(United Kingdom) Hope Crisp (United Kingdom) Agnes Tuckey	6	6

Final
(United Kingdom) James Cecil Parke (United Kingdom) Ethel Larcombe	6	3^{r}
(United Kingdom) Hope Crisp (United Kingdom) Agnes Tuckey	3	5

=== Top half ===
==== Section 1 ====
First round

Second round
(United Kingdom) FF Roe (United Kingdom) Dorothy Holman	4	6	6
(United Kingdom) LS Lee (United Kingdom) BMS Lee	6	4	2
(United Kingdom) Walter Crawley (United Kingdom) Jessie Greene	6	6
(United Kingdom) FN Thorne (United Kingdom) GB Foster	2	2
(United Kingdom) Theodore Mavrogordato (United Kingdom) Mabel Parton	4	6	6
(South Africa) CR Leach (United Kingdom) Mildred Coles	6	4	2
(Germany) Heinrich Kleinschroth (Germany) Mieken Rieck	6	6
(United Kingdom) Alfred Beamish (United Kingdom) Winifred Beamish	3	2

Third round
(United Kingdom) FF Roe (United Kingdom) D Holman	6	6
(United Kingdom) W Crawley (United Kingdom) J Greene	4	0
(United Kingdom) T Mavrogordato (United Kingdom) M Parton	7	6
(Germany) H Kleinschroth (Germany) M Rieck	5	1

Quarterfinals
(United Kingdom) FF Roe (United Kingdom) D Holman	3	3
(United Kingdom) T Mavrogordato (United Kingdom) M Parton	6	6

==== Section 2 ====
First round
(United Kingdom) James Cecil Parke (United Kingdom) Ethel Larcombe
(United Kingdom) HB Bland (United Kingdom) BM Warren	w/o
(Australia) Stanley Doust (United Kingdom) Dorothea Lambert Chambers	13	6
(Germany) Friedrich Rahe (United Kingdom) Charlotte Sterry	11	2
(United Kingdom) Arthur Gore (United States) Elizabeth Ryan	6	6
(United Kingdom) Arthur Lowe (United Kingdom) Mrs WE Hudleston	3	2
(United Kingdom) Evan Gwynne-Evans (United Kingdom) Helen Aitchison	6	0	7
(United Kingdom) George Thomas (United Kingdom) Marie Hazel	4	6	5
(United Kingdom) Herbert Roper Barrett (United Kingdom) Agnes Morton	7	6
(United Kingdom) FF Muecke (United Kingdom) Mrs FS Warburg	5	4

Second round
(United Kingdom) Albert Prebble (United Kingdom) Dora Boothby	6	6
(United Kingdom) Noel Turnbull (United Kingdom) Mrs CE Hunter	0	3
(United Kingdom) Kenneth Powell (United Kingdom) Olive Manser	3	2
(United Kingdom) JC Parke (United Kingdom) E Larcombe	6	6
(Australia) S Doust (United Kingdom) D Lambert Chambers	3	6	6
(United Kingdom) A Gore (United States) E Ryan	6	2	3
(United Kingdom) E Gwynne-Evans (United Kingdom) H Aitchison	6	2	3
(United Kingdom) HR Barrett (United Kingdom) A Morton	3	6	6

Third round
(United Kingdom) A Prebble (United Kingdom) D Boothby	w/o
(United Kingdom) JC Parke (United Kingdom) E Larcombe
(Australia) S Doust (United Kingdom) D Lambert Chambers	4	4
(United Kingdom) HR Barrett (United Kingdom) A Morton	6	6

Quarterfinals
(United Kingdom) JC Parke (United Kingdom) E Larcombe	6	6
(United Kingdom) HR Barrett (United Kingdom) A Morton	2	2

=== Bottom half ===
==== Section 3 ====
First round
(South Africa) RF Le Sueur (United Kingdom) Tessa Hall	7	6
(Australia) Ernest Hicks (United Kingdom) J Coles	5	3
(United Kingdom) RD Nolan (United Kingdom) Mrs Perrett	6	6
(United Kingdom) SF Thol (United Kingdom) Mrs AA Hall	4	1
(United Kingdom) Charles Dixon (United Kingdom) Edith Hannam	7	6
(United Kingdom) Charles Simond (United Kingdom) D Boadle	5	1
(United Kingdom) FR Price (United Kingdom) Mrs Nesham	6	11
(United Kingdom) AH Bowling (United Kingdom) KM Allen	4	9

Second round
(South Africa) RF Le Sueur (United Kingdom) T Hall	3	7	6
(United Kingdom) RD Nolan (United Kingdom) Mrs Perrett	6	5	3
(United Kingdom) Charles Dixon (United Kingdom) Edith Hannam	6	6
(United Kingdom) FR Price (United Kingdom) Mrs Nesham	1	1
(United Kingdom) NSB Kidson (United Kingdom) Madeline O'Neill
(United States) R. Norris Williams (United Kingdom) Aurea Edgington	w/o
(South Africa) Victor Gauntlett (United Kingdom) Vera Spofforth	6	7
(United Kingdom) GTC Watt (United Kingdom) Beryl Tulloch	3	5

Third round
(South Africa) RF Le Sueur (United Kingdom) T Hall	1	4
(United Kingdom) C Dixon (United Kingdom) E Hannam	6	6
(United Kingdom) NSB Kidson (United Kingdom) M O'Neill	1	6	6
(South Africa) V Gauntlett (United Kingdom) V Spofforth	6	4	4

Quarterfinals
(United Kingdom) C Dixon (United Kingdom) E Hannam	6	4	4
(United Kingdom) NSB Kidson (United Kingdom) M O'Neill	3	6	6

==== Section 4 ====
First round

Second round
(United Kingdom) Hope Crisp (United Kingdom) Agnes Tuckey	11	6
(United Kingdom) George Greville (United Kingdom) Edith Greville	9	4
(Australia) Alfred Jones (United Kingdom) Blanche Hillyard	7	7
(United States) Craig Biddle (United Kingdom) M Brooksmith	5	5
(Austria) Ludwig von Salm-Hoogstraeten (United Kingdom) Constance Luard	8	6
(Germany) Oscar Kreuzer (United Kingdom) Phyllis Satterthwaite	6	4
(United Kingdom) Roderick McNair (United Kingdom) Winifred McNair	6	4	6
(United Kingdom) JB Ward (United Kingdom) Mrs Armstrong	3	6	4

Third round
(United Kingdom) H Crisp (United Kingdom) A Tuckey	6	6
(Australia) A Jones (United Kingdom) B Hillyard	2	3
(Austria) L von Salm-Hoogstraeten (United Kingdom) C Luard	3	6
(United Kingdom) R McNair (United Kingdom) W McNair	6	8

Quarterfinals
(United Kingdom) H Crisp (United Kingdom) A Tuckey	6	3	6
(United Kingdom) R McNair (United Kingdom) W McNair	2	6	4
