= 1914 Wimbledon Championships – Women's singles =

Women's singles
- 1914 Wimbledon Championships

Final
- Champion: (United Kingdom) Dorothea Lambert Chambers
- Runner-up: (United Kingdom) Ethel Larcombe
- Score: 7–5, 6–4

Details
- Draw: 51
- Seeds: –

Events
Singles	men	women		boys	girls
Doubles	men	women	mixed	boys	girls
← 1913 ·	Wimbledon Championships	· 1919 →

Ethel Larcombe defeated Elizabeth Ryan 6–3, 6–2 in the All Comers' Final, but the reigning champion Dorothea Lambert Chambers defeated Larcombe 7–5, 6–4 in the challenge round to win the ladies' singles tennis title at the 1914 Wimbledon Championships.

== Draw ==
=== Key ===
- Q = Qualifier
- WC = Wild card
- LL = Lucky loser
- Alt = Alternate
- SE = Special exempt
- PR = Protected ranking
- ITF = ITF entry
- JE = Junior exempt
- w/o = Walkover
- r = Retired
- d = Defaulted
- SR = Special ranking

=== Challenge round ===
Challenge Round
(United Kingdom) Ethel Larcombe	3	2
(United Kingdom) Dorothea Lambert Chambers	6	6

=== All comers' finals ===
Quarterfinals
(United Kingdom) Doris Craddock	1	3
(United Kingdom) Aurea Edgington	6	6
(United Kingdom) Agnes Tuckey	w/o
(United Kingdom) Ethel Larcombe
(United Kingdom) B Leader	2	0
(United Kingdom) Helen Aitchison	6	6
(United States) Elizabeth Ryan	6	6
(United Kingdom) Betty Crundall Punnett	0	3

Semifinals
(United Kingdom) Aurea Edgington	4	3
(United Kingdom) Ethel Larcombe	6	6
(United Kingdom) Helen Aitchison	4	3
(United States) Elizabeth Ryan	6	6

Final
(United Kingdom) Ethel Larcombe	6	6
(United States) Elizabeth Ryan	3	2

=== Top half ===
==== Section 1 ====
First round
(United Kingdom) Hilda Lane	3	6	6
(United Kingdom) Eleanor Rose	6	4	4
(United Kingdom) Aurea Edgington	6	6
(United Kingdom) Mrs RWF Harding	0	1

Second round
(United Kingdom) Doris Craddock	6	6
(United Kingdom) Mabel Davy	0	3
(United Kingdom) GB Palmer
(United Kingdom) Mrs Ritchie	w/o
(United Kingdom) Madeline O'Neill	7	9
(United Kingdom) Vera Spofforth	5	7
(United Kingdom) H Lane	4	6	4
(United Kingdom) A Edgington	6	2	6

Third round
(United Kingdom) D Craddock	4	6	8
(United Kingdom) GB Palmer	6	2	6
(United Kingdom) M O'Neill	3	3
(United Kingdom) A Edgington	6	6

Quarterfinals
(United Kingdom) D Craddock	1	3
(United Kingdom) A Edgington	6	6

==== Section 2 ====
First round
(United Kingdom) Agnes Tuckey	6	6
(United Kingdom) Mrs F Schmitz	4	2
(France) Marguerite Broquedis	6	6
(United Kingdom) Mrs HV Parbury	4	2
(United Kingdom) Dorothy Holman
(United Kingdom) WEM Hill	w/o
(United Kingdom) Winifred Beamish
D Elliadi	w/o
(United Kingdom) Mrs GC Hampton
(United Kingdom) Mrs Jacob	w/o
(United Kingdom) Ethel Larcombe	6	6
(United Kingdom) Miss Baldwin	2	2
(United Kingdom) Charlotte Sterry	6	6
(United Kingdom) ML Fison	2	2
(United Kingdom) Winifred McNair	6	4	6
(United Kingdom) BMS Lee	2	6	3

Second round
(United Kingdom) A Tuckey	6	5	6
(France) M Broquedis	1	7	2
(United Kingdom) D Holman	6	5	8
(United Kingdom) W Beamish	1	7	6
(United Kingdom) Mrs GC Hampton	2	3
(United Kingdom) E Larcombe	6	6
(United Kingdom) C Sterry	6	7
(United Kingdom) W McNair	4	5

Third round
(United Kingdom) A Tuckey	8	3	6
(United Kingdom) D Holman	6	6	4
(United Kingdom) E Larcombe	6	6
(United Kingdom) C Sterry	2	1

Quarterfinals
(United Kingdom) A Tuckey	w/o
(United Kingdom) E Larcombe

The nationality of D Elliadi is unknown.

=== Bottom half ===
==== Section 3 ====
First round
(United Kingdom) B Leader	6	6
(United Kingdom) Mrs Barclay	3	0
(United Kingdom) Mrs A Mitchell	6	6
(United Kingdom) Dorothy Betty	0	1
(United Kingdom) Jessie Greene	6	3	6
(United Kingdom) Mrs Williams	2	6	4
(United Kingdom) Mrs WH Holloway	6	6
(United Kingdom) Dorothy Greenhough-Smith	0	4
(United Kingdom) Violet Pinckney	6	6
(United Kingdom) Mrs AL Baker	1	1
(United Kingdom) Helen Aitchison	6	6
(United Kingdom) Mabel Parton	2	4
(United Kingdom) Beryl Tulloch	2	7	6
(United Kingdom) Edith Hannam	6	5	4
(United Kingdom) Agnes Morton	6	6
(United Kingdom) Phyllis Satterthwaite	2	3

Second round
(United Kingdom) B Leader	6	6
(United Kingdom) Mrs A Mitchell	4	3
(United Kingdom) J Greene	6	1	6
(United Kingdom) Mrs WH Holloway	4	6	3
(United Kingdom) V Pinckney	3	0
(United Kingdom) H Aitchison	6	6
(United Kingdom) B Tulloch	1	3
(United Kingdom) A Morton	6	6

Third round
(United Kingdom) B Leader	7	6
(United Kingdom) J Greene	5	3
(United Kingdom) H Aitchison	7	6
(United Kingdom) A Morton	5	3

Quarterfinals
(United Kingdom) B Leader	2	0
(United Kingdom) H Aitchison	6	6

==== Section 4 ====
First round
(United States) Elizabeth Ryan	6	6
(United Kingdom) E Nash	0	1

Second round
(United States) E Ryan
(United Kingdom) Mrs DK Hole	w/o
(United Kingdom) Edith Johnson	6	6
(United Kingdom) Countess Drogheda	0	0
(United Kingdom) CM Douglass	3	6	6
(United Kingdom) Mrs Nesham	6	3	2
(United Kingdom) Betty Crundall Punnett	6	8
(United Kingdom) Susannah Willford	2	6

Third round
(United States) E Ryan	6	6
(United Kingdom) E Johnson	2	3
(United Kingdom) CM Douglass	1	4
(United Kingdom) B Crundall Punnett	6	6

Quarterfinals
(United States) E Ryan	6	6
(United Kingdom) B Crundall Punnett	0	3

Preceded by 1914 U.S. National Championships – Women's singles	Grand Slam women's singles	Succeeded by 1915 U.S. National Championships – Women's singles
