= 1914 Wimbledon Championships – Women's doubles =

Women's doubles
- 1914 Wimbledon Championships

Final
- Champions: (United Kingdom) Agnes Morton (United States) Elizabeth Ryan
- Runners-up: (United Kingdom) Edith Hannam (United Kingdom) Ethel Larcombe
- Score: 6–1, 6–3

Details
- Draw: 20
- Seeds: –

Events
Singles	men	women		boys	girls
Doubles	men	women	mixed	boys	girls
← 1913 ·	Wimbledon Championships	· 1919 →

Dora Boothby and Winifred McNair were the defending champions, but Boothby did not participate. McNair partnered with Mabel Parton but they lost in the second round to Edith Hannam and Ethel Larcombe.

Agnes Morton and Elizabeth Ryan defeated Hannam and Larcombe in the final, 6–1, 6–3 to win the ladies' doubles tennis title at the 1914 Wimbledon Championships.

== Draw ==
=== Key ===
- Q = Qualifier
- WC = Wild card
- LL = Lucky loser
- Alt = Alternate
- SE = Special exempt
- PR = Protected ranking
- ITF = ITF entry
- JE = Junior exempt
- w/o = Walkover
- r = Retired
- d = Defaulted
- SR = Special ranking

=== Finals ===
Semifinals
(France) Marguerite Broquedis (United Kingdom) Violet Pinckney	2	0
(United Kingdom) Edith Hannam (United Kingdom) Ethel Larcombe	6	6
(United Kingdom) Agnes Morton (United States) Elizabeth Ryan	6	6
(United Kingdom) Dorothea Lambert Chambers (United Kingdom) Charlotte Sterry	4	1

Final
(United Kingdom) Edith Hannam (United Kingdom) Ethel Larcombe	1	3
(United Kingdom) Agnes Morton (United States) Elizabeth Ryan	6	6

=== Top half ===
First round
(United Kingdom) Winifred McNair (United Kingdom) Mabel Parton	6	6
(United Kingdom) Edith Johnson (United Kingdom) Beryl Tulloch	2	2
(United Kingdom) Mrs AL Baker (United Kingdom) CM Douglass	1	2
(United Kingdom) Edith Hannam (United Kingdom) Ethel Larcombe	6	6

Second round
(United Kingdom) Mrs Barclay (United Kingdom) Dorothy Greenhough-Smith	1	2
(France) Marguerite Broquedis (United Kingdom) Violet Pinckney	6	6
(United Kingdom) Mrs GC Hampton (United Kingdom) Mrs HV Parbury	6	3	1^{r}
(United Kingdom) Mrs Nesham (United Kingdom) Mrs F Schmidt	4	6	2
(United Kingdom) WEM Hill (United Kingdom) Mrs A Mitchell	7	3	2
(United Kingdom) Mrs Armstrong (United Kingdom) Hazel Hogarth	5	6	6
(United Kingdom) W McNair (United Kingdom) M Parton	6	4	3
(United Kingdom) E Hannam (United Kingdom) E Larcombe	2	6	6

Quarterfinals
(France) M Broquedis (United Kingdom) V Pinckney	6	6
(United Kingdom) Mrs Nesham (United Kingdom) Mrs F Schmidt	1	2
(United Kingdom) Mrs Armstrong (United Kingdom) H Hogarth	3	2
(United Kingdom) E Hannam (United Kingdom) E Larcombe	6	6

Semifinals
(France) M Broquedis (United Kingdom) V Pinckney	2	0
(United Kingdom) E Hannam (United Kingdom) E Larcombe	6	6

=== Bottom half ===
First round
(United Kingdom) Mabel Davy (United Kingdom) Mrs RWF Harding	6	4
(United Kingdom) ML Fison (United Kingdom) E Nash	8	6
(United Kingdom) Hilda Lane (United Kingdom) Madeline O'Neill	6	6	1
(United Kingdom) Miss Baldwin (United Kingdom) Phyllis Satterthwaite	3	8	6

Second round
(United Kingdom) ML Fison (United Kingdom) E Nash	2	4
(United Kingdom) Miss Baldwin (United Kingdom) P Satterthwaite	6	6
(United Kingdom) Helen Aitchison (United Kingdom) Agnes Tuckey	4	2
(United Kingdom) Agnes Morton (United States) Elizabeth Ryan	6	6
(United Kingdom) Winifred Beamish (United Kingdom) BMS Lee	4	5
(United Kingdom) Aurea Edgington (United Kingdom) Dorothy Holman	6	7
(United Kingdom) Jessie Greene (United Kingdom) Eleanor Rose	0	2
(United Kingdom) Dorothea Lambert Chambers (United Kingdom) Charlotte Sterry	6	6

Quarterfinals
(United Kingdom) Miss Baldwin (United Kingdom) P Satterthwaite	5	1
(United Kingdom) A Morton (United States) E Ryan	7	6
(United Kingdom) A Edgington (United Kingdom) D Holman	3	2
(United Kingdom) D Lambert Chambers (United Kingdom) C Sterry	6	6

Semifinals
(United Kingdom) A Morton (United States) E Ryan	6	6
(United Kingdom) D Lambert Chambers (United Kingdom) C Sterry	4	1
