= 1913 Wimbledon Championships – Women's doubles =

Women's doubles
- 1913 Wimbledon Championships

Final
- Champions: (United Kingdom) Dora Boothby (United Kingdom) Winifred McNair
- Runners-up: (United Kingdom) Dorothea Lambert Chambers (United Kingdom) Charlotte Sterry
- Score: 4–6, 2–4 retired

Details
- Draw: 21
- Seeds: –

Events
Singles	men	women		boys	girls
Doubles	men	women	mixed	boys	girls
Wimbledon Championships	· 1914 →

Dora Boothby and Winifred McNair defeated Dorothea Lambert Chambers and Charlotte Sterry in the final, 4–6, 2–4 retired to win the inaugural Ladies' Doubles tennis title at the 1913 Wimbledon Championships.

== Draw ==
=== Key ===
- Q = Qualifier
- WC = Wild card
- LL = Lucky loser
- Alt = Alternate
- SE = Special exempt
- PR = Protected ranking
- ITF = ITF entry
- JE = Junior exempt
- w/o = Walkover
- r = Retired
- d = Defaulted
- SR = Special ranking

=== Finals ===
Semifinals
(United Kingdom) Dorothea Lambert Chambers (United Kingdom) Charlotte Sterry	6	2	6
(United Kingdom) Mrs Armstrong (United Kingdom) Olive Manser	3	6	3
(United Kingdom) Ethel Larcombe (United Kingdom) Mabel Parton	3	4
(United Kingdom) Dora Boothby (United Kingdom) Winifred McNair	6	6

Final
(United Kingdom) Dorothea Lambert Chambers (United Kingdom) Charlotte Sterry	6	4^{r}
(United Kingdom) Dora Boothby (United Kingdom) Winifred McNair	4	2

=== Top half ===
First round
(United Kingdom) J Coles (United Kingdom) Mrs FS Warburg	2	1
(United Kingdom) Dorothy Holman (United Kingdom) Phyllis Satterthwaite	6	6
(United Kingdom) KM Allen (United Kingdom) Mrs AA Hall	2	3
(United Kingdom) Agnes Morton (United States) Elizabeth Ryan	6	6
(United Kingdom) Mrs Armstrong (United Kingdom) Olive Manser
(United Kingdom) Blanche Hillyard (United Kingdom) Gladys Lamplough	w/o

Second round
(United Kingdom) Aurea Edgington (Germany) Mieken Rieck	w/o
(United Kingdom) Dorothea Lambert Chambers (United Kingdom) Charlotte Sterry
(United Kingdom) Helen Aitchison (United Kingdom) Agnes Tuckey	6	6
(United Kingdom) Jessie Greene (United Kingdom) Eleanor Rose	1	3
(United Kingdom) BMS Lee (United Kingdom) Mrs Perrett	3	2
(United Kingdom) D Holman (United Kingdom) P Satterthwaite	6	6
(United Kingdom) A Morton (United States) E Ryan	4	3
(United Kingdom) Mrs Armstrong (United Kingdom) O Manser	6	6

Quarterfinals
(United Kingdom) D Lambert Chambers (United Kingdom) C Sterry	6	6
(United Kingdom) H Aitchison (United Kingdom) A Tuckey	1	2
(United Kingdom) D Holman (United Kingdom) P Satterthwaite	3	3
(United Kingdom) Mrs Armstrong (United Kingdom) O Manser	6	6

Semifinals
(United Kingdom) C Sterry (United Kingdom) D Lambert Chambers	6	2	6
(United Kingdom) Mrs Armstrong (United Kingdom) O Manser	3	6	3

=== Bottom half ===
First round
(United Kingdom) Edith Hannam (United Kingdom) Constance Luard
(United Kingdom) Hilda Lane (United Kingdom) Mrs Nesham	w/o
(United Kingdom) Ethel Larcombe (United Kingdom) Mabel Parton	6	6
(United Kingdom) Winifred Beamish (United Kingdom) Madeline O'Neill	2	1

Second round
(United Kingdom) E Hannam (United Kingdom) C Luard	1	6	3
(United Kingdom) E Larcombe (United Kingdom) M Parton	6	2	6
(United Kingdom) Tessa Hall (United Kingdom) Vera Spofforth
(United Kingdom) Mildred Coles (United Kingdom) Marie Hazel	w/o
(United Kingdom) M Brooksmith (United Kingdom) Edith Greville	6	6
(United Kingdom) GB Foster (United Kingdom) Mrs Lambert	1	2
(United Kingdom) Mrs WE Hudleston (United Kingdom) Beryl Tulloch	4	6	3
(United Kingdom) Dora Boothby (United Kingdom) Winifred McNair	6	4	6

Quarterfinals
(United Kingdom) E Larcombe (United Kingdom) M Parton	6	6
(United Kingdom) T Hall (United Kingdom) V Spofforth	3	3
(United Kingdom) M Brooksmith (United Kingdom) E Greville	4	5
(United Kingdom) D Boothby (United Kingdom) W McNair	6	7

Semifinals
(United Kingdom) E Larcombe (United Kingdom) M Parton	3	4
(United Kingdom) D Boothby (United Kingdom) W McNair	6	6
