= 1921 Wimbledon Championships – Mixed doubles =

Mixed doubles
- 1921 Wimbledon Championships

Final
- Champions: (United Kingdom) Randolph Lycett (United States) Elizabeth Ryan
- Runners-up: (United Kingdom) Max Woosnam (United Kingdom) Phyllis Howkins
- Score: 6–3, 6–1

Details
- Draw: 64
- Seeds: –

Events
Singles	men	women		boys	girls
Doubles	men	women	mixed	boys	girls
← 1920 ·	Wimbledon Championships	· 1922 →

Gerald Patterson and Suzanne Lenglen were the defending champions, but Patterson did not participate. Lenglen partnered with André Gobert but they lost in the second round to eventual champions Randolph Lycett and Elizabeth Ryan.

Lycett and Ryan defeated Max Woosnam and Phyllis Howkins in the final, 6–3, 6–1 to win the mixed doubles tennis title at the 1921 Wimbledon Championships.

== Draw ==
=== Key ===
- Q = Qualifier
- WC = Wild card
- LL = Lucky loser
- Alt = Alternate
- SE = Special exempt
- PR = Protected ranking
- ITF = ITF entry
- JE = Junior exempt
- w/o = Walkover
- r = Retired
- d = Defaulted
- SR = Special ranking

=== Finals ===
Quarterfinals
(United Kingdom) Charles Scroope (United Kingdom) Mrs Armstrong	4	2
(United Kingdom) Alfred Beamish (United Kingdom) Ethel Larcombe	6	6
(United Kingdom) Randolph Lycett (United States) Elizabeth Ryan	6	7
(New Zealand) Frank Fisher (South Africa) Irene Peacock	2	5
(United Kingdom) Max Woosnam (United Kingdom) Phyllis Howkins	6	7
(United Kingdom) Percival Davson (United Kingdom) Dorothea Lambert Chambers	4	5
(United Kingdom) Jack Hillyard (United Kingdom) Phyllis Satterthwaite	3	2
(Spain) Manuel Alonso (United Kingdom) Winifred McNair	6	6

Semifinals
(United Kingdom) Alfred Beamish (United Kingdom) Ethel Larcombe	4	1
(United Kingdom) Randolph Lycett (United States) Elizabeth Ryan	6	6
(United Kingdom) Max Woosnam (United Kingdom) Phyllis Howkins	6	6
(Spain) Manuel Alonso (United Kingdom) Winifred McNair	1	4

Final
(United Kingdom) Randolph Lycett (United States) Elizabeth Ryan	6	6
(United Kingdom) Max Woosnam (United Kingdom) Phyllis Howkins	3	1

=== Top half ===
==== Section 1 ====
First round
(United Kingdom) Charles Scroope (United Kingdom) Mrs Armstrong	2	6	6
(United Kingdom) Harold Aitken (United Kingdom) KAH Todd	6	3	1
(United Kingdom) T Moss (United Kingdom) Mrs A Mitchell	w/o
(United Kingdom) George Thomas (United Kingdom) Hazel Hogarth
(India) Lewis Deane (United Kingdom) Una Gracey	8	6
(United Kingdom) GTC Watt (United Kingdom) Dorothy Kemmis-Betty	6	3
(United Kingdom) Herbert Roper Barrett (United Kingdom) Mabel Clayton	6	6
(United Kingdom) GR Ashton (United Kingdom) Dorothy Holman	4	3
(United Kingdom) Ulysses Williams; Mrs EP Hicks	6	9	2
(United Kingdom) Thomas Bevan (United Kingdom) Mrs IFL Elliot	2	11	6
(United Kingdom) Alfred Beamish (United Kingdom) Ethel Larcombe	6	6
(United Kingdom) RS Barnes (United Kingdom) Helen Leisk	3	2
(United Kingdom) Ernest Lamb (United Kingdom) Aurea Edgington	6	1	7
(United Kingdom) William Radcliffe (United Kingdom) EE Tanner	4	6	5
(United Kingdom) Ben Haughton (United Kingdom) WM Haughton	6	6
(United Kingdom) Gerry Millard (United Kingdom) Blanche Colston	4	4

Second round
(United Kingdom) C Scroope (United Kingdom) Mrs Armstrong	6	5	6
(United Kingdom) G Thomas (United Kingdom) H Hogarth	2	7	2
(India) L Deane (United Kingdom) U Gracey	6	6
(United Kingdom) HR Barrett (United Kingdom) M Clayton	4	4
(United Kingdom) T Bevan (United Kingdom) Mrs IFL Elliot	3	1
(United Kingdom) A Beamish (United Kingdom) E Larcombe	6	6
(United Kingdom) E Lamb (United Kingdom) A Edgington	4	8	3
(United Kingdom) B Haughton (United Kingdom) W Haughton	6	6	6

Third round
(United Kingdom) C Scroope (United Kingdom) Mrs Armstrong	11	6
(India) L Deane (United Kingdom) U Gracey	9	2
(United Kingdom) A Beamish (United Kingdom) E Larcombe	8	5	6
(United Kingdom) B Haughton (United Kingdom) WM Haughton	6	7	4

Quarterfinals
(United Kingdom) C Scroope (United Kingdom) Mrs Armstrong	4	2
(United Kingdom) A Beamish (United Kingdom) E Larcombe	6	6

The nationality of Mrs EP Hicks is unknown.

==== Section 2 ====
First round
(United Kingdom) Randolph Lycett (United States) Elizabeth Ryan	6	6
(United Kingdom) Arthur Gore (United Kingdom) Mrs HB Weston	3	1
(South Africa) Gerald Sherwell (United Kingdom) Winifred Beamish	5	5
(France) André Gobert (France) Suzanne Lenglen	7	7
(United Kingdom) CS Grace; HA Lane	1	1
(United Kingdom) JCF Simpson (United Kingdom) Louise Bull	6	6
(Netherlands) Arthur Diemer-Kool (Netherlands) Marie Diemer-Kool	1	3
(United Kingdom) John Cecil Masterman (United Kingdom) Norah Middleton	6	6
(United Kingdom) Frank Jarvis (United Kingdom) Dorothy Shepherd	6	6
(United Kingdom) CA McConchie (United Kingdom) Weeta Donaldson	2	2
(United Kingdom) Leonard Lyle; Mrs FW Orr	4	4
(United Kingdom) Hew Stoker (United Kingdom) R Foulger	6	6
(United Kingdom) FCG Fison (United Kingdom) SM Fison	w/o
(United Kingdom) Albert Prebble (United Kingdom) Dora Geen
(United Kingdom) Royden Dash (United Kingdom) Eleanor Rose	1	2
(New Zealand) Frank Fisher (South Africa) Irene Peacock	6	6

Second round
(United Kingdom) R Lycett (United States) E Ryan
(France) A Gobert (France) S Lenglen	w/o
(United Kingdom) JCF Simpson (United Kingdom) L Bull	8	8
(United Kingdom) JC Masterman (United Kingdom) N Middleton	6	6
(United Kingdom) F Jarvis (United Kingdom) D Shepherd	6	6
(United Kingdom) H Stoker (United Kingdom) R Foulger	2	3
(United Kingdom) A Prebble (United Kingdom) D Geen	2	4
(New Zealand) F Fisher (South Africa) I Peacock	6	6

Third round
(United Kingdom) R Lycett (United States) E Ryan	6	6
(United Kingdom) JCF Simpson (United Kingdom) L Bull	0	2
(United Kingdom) F Jarvis (United Kingdom) D Shepherd	3	1
(New Zealand) F Fisher (South Africa) I Peacock	6	6

Quarterfinals
(United Kingdom) R Lycett (United States) E Ryan	6	7
(New Zealand) F Fisher (South Africa) I Peacock	2	5

The nationalities of Miss HA Lane and Mrs FW Orr are unknown.

=== Bottom half ===
==== Section 3 ====
First round
(India) Sydney Jacob (United Kingdom) Annie Cobb	4	5
(United Kingdom) Charles Dixon (United Kingdom) Evelyn Colyer	6	7
(United Kingdom) Max Woosnam (United Kingdom) Phyllis Howkins	7	7
(United Kingdom) Percy Oakley (United Kingdom) MS Scott	5	5
(United Kingdom) EG Bisseker (United Kingdom) Mrs HA Davis	w/o
(United States) Bill Tilden (United States) Molla Mallory
(United Kingdom) LF Davin (United Kingdom) M Thom	5	5
(United Kingdom) Theodore Mavrogordato (United Kingdom) Mabel Parton	7	7
(India) Cotah Ramaswami (United Kingdom) Madeline O'Neill	6	6
(India) Athar-Ali Fyzee (United Kingdom) Mrs Perrett	3	3
(United Kingdom) CS Gordon-Smith (United Kingdom) Peggy Dransfield	2	9	4
(United States) Arnold Jones (United States) Edith Sigourney	6	7	6
(United Kingdom) Percival Davson (United Kingdom) Dorothea Lambert Chambers	6	7
(United Kingdom) Humphrey Milford (United Kingdom) Mrs HV Parbury	4	5
(United Kingdom) Brian Gilbert (United Kingdom) Margaret McKane	5	6	4
(United Kingdom) Alfred Ingram (United Kingdom) Peggy Ingram	7	2	6

Second round
(United Kingdom) C Dixon (United Kingdom) E Colyer	4	2
(United Kingdom) M Woosnam (United Kingdom) P Howkins	6	6
(United States) W Tilden (United States) M Mallory	6	2	8
(United Kingdom) T Mavrogordato (United Kingdom) M Parton	3	6	6
(India) C Ramaswami (United Kingdom) M O'Neill	4	6	7
(United States) A Jones (United States) E Sigourney	6	3	5
(United Kingdom) P Davson (United Kingdom) D Lambert Chambers	6	6
(United Kingdom) A Ingram (United Kingdom) M Ingram	3	4

Third round
(United Kingdom) M Woosnam (United Kingdom) P Howkins	3	6	9
(United States) W Tilden (United States) M Mallory	6	3	7
(India) C Ramaswami (United Kingdom) M O'Neill	3	4
(United Kingdom) P Davson (United Kingdom) D Lambert Chambers	6	6

Quarterfinals
(United Kingdom) M Woosnam (United Kingdom) P Howkins	6	7
(United Kingdom) P Davson (United Kingdom) D Lambert Chambers	4	5

==== Section 4 ====
First round
(Sweden) Carl-Erik von Braun (United Kingdom) Mrs RRW Jackson	1	1
(United Kingdom) Patrick Wheatley (United Kingdom) NB Palmer	6	6
(United Kingdom) Leslie Godfree (United Kingdom) Kitty McKane	1	4
(United Kingdom) Jack Hillyard (United Kingdom) Phyllis Satterthwaite	6	6
(United Kingdom) GDH Alston (United Kingdom) Tiny Alston	6	5	6
(United Kingdom) Bill Swinden (United Kingdom) E Kelsey	2	7	3
C Goodall (United Kingdom) MM Fergus
(United Kingdom) Ambrose Dudley (United Kingdom) Doris Craddock	w/o
(India) Hassan Ali Fyzee (United Kingdom) Mrs Rowand Harker	3	2
(Spain) Manuel Alonso (United Kingdom) Winifred McNair	6	6
(United Kingdom) Henry Martin; Mrs D Harvey	6	6
(Belgium) Paul de Borman (Belgium) Anne de Borman	4	4
(Switzerland) René de Grenus (United Kingdom) Mrs LH Wimble
(Netherlands) Christiaan van Lennep (Netherlands) Grace van Lennep	w/o
(United Kingdom) WL Hollick (United Kingdom) Mrs WL Hollick	6	6
(United Kingdom) MRL White (United Kingdom) Mrs Anstey	3	1

Second round
(United Kingdom) P Wheatley (United Kingdom) NB Palmer	3	3
(United Kingdom) J Hillyard (United Kingdom) P Satterthwaite	6	6
(United Kingdom) GDH Alston (United Kingdom) T Alston	4	0
C Goodall (United Kingdom) MM Fergus	6	6
(Spain) M Alonso (United Kingdom) W McNair	6	6
(United Kingdom) H Martin; Mrs D Harvey	0	3
(Switzerland) R de Grenus (United Kingdom) Mrs LH Wimble	3	1
(United Kingdom) WL Hollick (United Kingdom) Mrs WL Hollick	6	6

Third round
(United Kingdom) J Hillyard (United Kingdom) P Satterthwaite	6	6
C Goodall (United Kingdom) MM Fergus	2	2
(Spain) M Alonso (United Kingdom) W McNair	7	6
(United Kingdom) WL Hollick (United Kingdom) Mrs WL Hollick	5	3

Quarterfinals
(United Kingdom) J Hillyard (United Kingdom) P Satterthwaite	3	2
(Spain) M Alonso (United Kingdom) W McNair	6	6

The nationalities of C Goodall and Mrs D Harvey are unknown.
