= 1919 Wimbledon Championships – Women's doubles =

Women's doubles
- 1919 Wimbledon Championships

Final
- Champions: (France) Suzanne Lenglen (United States) Elizabeth Ryan
- Runners-up: (United Kingdom) Dorothea Lambert Chambers (United Kingdom) Ethel Larcombe
- Score: 4–6, 7–5, 6–3

Details
- Draw: 18
- Seeds: –

Events
Singles	men	women		boys	girls
Doubles	men	women	mixed	boys	girls
← 1914 ·	Wimbledon Championships	· 1920 →

Agnes Morton and Elizabeth Ryan were the defending champions, but Morton did not participate. Ryan partnered with Suzanne Lenglen, and went on to defeat Dorothea Lambert Chambers and Ethel Larcombe in the final, 4–6, 7–5, 6–3 to win the ladies' doubles tennis title at the 1919 Wimbledon Championships.

== Draw ==
=== Key ===
- Q = Qualifier
- WC = Wild card
- LL = Lucky loser
- Alt = Alternate
- SE = Special exempt
- PR = Protected ranking
- ITF = ITF entry
- JE = Junior exempt
- w/o = Walkover
- r = Retired
- d = Defaulted
- SR = Special ranking

=== Finals ===
Semifinals
(United Kingdom) Winifred McNair (United Kingdom) Mabel Parton	2	1
(France) Suzanne Lenglen (United States) Elizabeth Ryan	6	6
(United Kingdom) Dorothea Lambert Chambers (United Kingdom) Ethel Larcombe	6	6
(United Kingdom) Tessa Hall (United Kingdom) Dorothy Holman	1	2

Final
(France) Suzanne Lenglen (United States) Elizabeth Ryan	4	7	6
(United Kingdom) Dorothea Lambert Chambers (United Kingdom) Ethel Larcombe	6	5	3

=== Top half ===
First round
(South Africa) Mrs CA Beck (United Kingdom) E Tighe	4	3
(United Kingdom) Annie Cobb (United Kingdom) Margaret McKane	6	6

Second round
(United Kingdom) Mrs AA Hall (United Kingdom) Mrs Lamb	1	2
(United Kingdom) Mrs Armstrong (United Kingdom) Olive Manser	6	6
(United Kingdom) Nora Durlacher (United Kingdom) Ruth Durlacher	1	1
(United Kingdom) Winifred McNair (United Kingdom) Mabel Parton	6	6
(France) Suzanne Lenglen (United States) Elizabeth Ryan
(United Kingdom) Helen Leisk (United Kingdom) Agnes Tuckey	w/o
(United Kingdom) Edith Greville (United Kingdom) Doris Craddock	2	6	4
(United Kingdom) A Cobb (United Kingdom) M McKane	6	2	6

Quarterfinals
(United Kingdom) Mrs Armstrong (United Kingdom) O Manser	5	0^{r}
(United Kingdom) W McNair (United Kingdom) M Parton	7	1
(France) S Lenglen (United States) E Ryan	6	6
(United Kingdom) A Cobb (United Kingdom) M McKane	2	1

Semifinals
(United Kingdom) W McNair (United Kingdom) M Parton	2	1
(France) S Lenglen (United States) E Ryan	6	6

=== Bottom half ===
First round
(United Kingdom) Peggy Dransfield (United Kingdom) Lavinia Radeglia	0	1
(United Kingdom) Winifred Beamish (United Kingdom) Charlotte Sterry	6	6

Second round
(United Kingdom) W Beamish (United Kingdom) C Sterry	5	6	3
(United Kingdom) Kitty McKane (United Kingdom) Phyllis Satterthwaite	7	4	6
(United Kingdom) GB Foster (United Kingdom) Mrs Perrett	1	0
(United Kingdom) Dorothea Lambert Chambers (United Kingdom) Ethel Larcombe	6	6
(United Kingdom) Edith Johnson (United Kingdom) Glays Lamplough	9	6	3
(United Kingdom) Mrs J O'Neill (United Kingdom) Mrs HB Silver	7	8	6
(United Kingdom) Aurea Edgington (United Kingdom) Mrs HC Hextall	2	2
(United Kingdom) Tessa Hall (United Kingdom) Dorothy Holman	6	6

Quarterfinals
(United Kingdom) K McKane (United Kingdom) P Satterthwaite	0	0
(United Kingdom) D Lambert Chambers (United Kingdom) E Larcombe	6	6
(United Kingdom) Mrs J O'Neill (United Kingdom) Mrs HB Silver	3	6	1
(United Kingdom) T Hall (United Kingdom) D Holman	6	2	6

Semifinals
(United Kingdom) D Lambert Chambers (United Kingdom) E Larcombe	6	6
(United Kingdom) T Hall (United Kingdom) D Holman	1	2
