= 1919 Wimbledon Championships – Mixed doubles =

Mixed doubles
- 1919 Wimbledon Championships

Final
- Champions: (Australia) Randolph Lycett (United States) Elizabeth Ryan
- Runners-up: (United Kingdom) Albert Prebble (United Kingdom) Dorothea Lambert Chambers
- Score: 6–0, 6–0

Details
- Draw: 42
- Seeds: –

Events
Singles	men	women		boys	girls
Doubles	men	women	mixed	boys	girls
← 1914 ·	Wimbledon Championships	· 1920 →

James Cecil Parke and Ethel Larcombe were the defending champions, but Parke did not participate. Larcombe partnered with Ronald Thomas but they lost in the semifinals to eventual champions Randolph Lycett and Elizabeth Ryan.

Lycett and Ryan defeated Albert Prebble and Dorothea Lambert Chambers in the final, 6–0, 6–0 to win the mixed doubles tennis title at the 1919 Wimbledon Championships.

== Draw ==
=== Key ===
- Q = Qualifier
- WC = Wild card
- LL = Lucky loser
- Alt = Alternate
- SE = Special exempt
- PR = Protected ranking
- ITF = ITF entry
- JE = Junior exempt
- w/o = Walkover
- r = Retired
- d = Defaulted
- SR = Special ranking

=== Finals ===
Quarterfinals
(Australia) Randolph Lycett (United States) Elizabeth Ryan	2	6	6
(France) William Laurentz (France) Suzanne Lenglen	6	4	2
(Australia) Pat O'Hara Wood (United Kingdom) Doris Craddock	5	3
(Australia) Ronald Thomas (United Kingdom) Ethel Larcombe	7	6
(United Kingdom) Albert Prebble (United Kingdom) Dorothea Lambert Chambers	6	8
(United Kingdom) Theodore Mavrogordato (United Kingdom) Mabel Parton	2	6
(France) Max Decugis (Australia) Lily Addison	6	6
(United Kingdom) George Watt (United Kingdom) Winifred Beamish	3	1

Semifinals
(Australia) Randolph Lycett (United States) Elizabeth Ryan	6	6
(Australia) Ronald Thomas (United Kingdom) Ethel Larcombe	2	3
(United Kingdom) Albert Prebble (United Kingdom) Dorothea Lambert Chambers	6	6
(France) Max Decugis (Australia) Lily Addison	1	0

Final
(Australia) Randolph Lycett (United States) Elizabeth Ryan	6	6
(United Kingdom) Albert Prebble (United Kingdom) Dorothea Lambert Chambers	0	0

=== Top half ===
==== Section 1 ====
First round

Second round
(United States) Dean Mathey (France) Doris Wolfson	1	4
(Australia) Randolph Lycett (United States) Elizabeth Ryan	6	6
(United Kingdom) CS Grace (United Kingdom) Lavinia Radeglia	1	5
(South Africa) Newton Thompson (United Kingdom) Annie Cobb	6	7
(France) William Laurentz (France) Suzanne Lenglen	6	6
(United Kingdom) CA McConchie; Miss Bristowe	0	1
(United Kingdom) Frank Riseley (United Kingdom) Madeline O'Neill	5	7	2
(United Kingdom) Noel Turnbull (United Kingdom) Agnes Tuckey	7	5	6

Third round
(Australia) R Lycett (United States) E Ryan	6	3	6
(South Africa) N Thompson (United Kingdom) A Cobb	4	6	3
(France) W Laurentz (France) S Lenglen	7	4	6
(United Kingdom) N Turnbull (United Kingdom) A Tuckey	5	6	1

Quarterfinals
(Australia) R Lycett (United States) E Ryan	2	6	6
(France) W Laurentz (France) S Lenglen	6	4	2

The nationality of Miss Bristowe is unknown.

==== Section 2 ====
First round
(United Kingdom) HB Silver (United Kingdom) Mrs HB Silver
(Australia) Gerald Patterson (United Kingdom) Phyllis Satterthwaite	w/o
(United Kingdom) Ambrose Dudley (United Kingdom) E Tighe	10	6
(United Kingdom) Dan Hanbury (United Kingdom) AG Ransome	8	1
CGM Plumer; Mrs Plumer	0	5
(Australia) Stanley Doust (United Kingdom) Winifred McNair	6	7
(United Kingdom) Alfred Ingram (United Kingdom) Dorothy Holman	3	2
(Australia) Ronald Thomas (United Kingdom) Ethel Larcombe	6	6
(South Africa) CA Beck (United Kingdom) Tessa Hall	3	3
(United Kingdom) Frank Donisthorpe (United Kingdom) D Ward	6	6

Second round
(South Africa) Brian Norton (United Kingdom) Peggy Dransfield	6	6
(United Kingdom) Harold King (United Kingdom) Mrs JH King	3	2
(Australia) Pat O'Hara Wood (United Kingdom) Doris Craddock	6	6
(United Kingdom) HB Silver (United Kingdom) Mrs HB Silver	1	2
(United Kingdom) A Dudley (United Kingdom) E Tighe	0	1
(Australia) S Doust (United Kingdom) W McNair	6	6
(Australia) R Thomas (United Kingdom) E Larcombe	6	6
(United Kingdom) F Donisthorpe (United Kingdom) D Ward	2	1

Third round
(South Africa) B Norton (United Kingdom) P Dransfield	4	3
(Australia) P O'Hara Wood (United Kingdom) D Craddock	6	6
(Australia) S Doust (United Kingdom) W McNair	1	1
(Australia) R Thomas (United Kingdom) E Larcombe	6	6

Quarterfinals
(Australia) P O'Hara Wood (United Kingdom) D Craddock	5	3
(Australia) R Thomas (United Kingdom) E Larcombe	7	6

The nationalities of CGM Plumer and Mrs Plumer are unknown.

=== Bottom half ===
==== Section 3 ====
First round
(United Kingdom) CBB Smith-Bingham (United Kingdom) Ruth Winch	1	2
(United Kingdom) Max Woosnam (United Kingdom) Edith Greville	6	6
(United Kingdom) Charles Dixon (United Kingdom) Helen Leisk	w/o
(United Kingdom) Clinton McIlquham (United Kingdom) GB Foster
(United Kingdom) JB Ward (United Kingdom) Mrs Armstrong	6	6
(South Africa) George Dodd (United Kingdom) NB Palmer	3	2
(United Kingdom) EG Bisseker (United Kingdom) Mrs AA Hall	3	1
(United Kingdom) Albert Prebble (United Kingdom) Dorothea Lambert Chambers	6	6
(United Kingdom) F Thomasson (United Kingdom) Mrs AG Wilkinson	6	6
(United Kingdom) Neville Willford (United Kingdom) Susannah Willford	0	1

Second round
(United Kingdom) M Woosnam (United Kingdom) E Greville	6	6
(United Kingdom) C McIlquham (United Kingdom) GB Foster	1	1
(United Kingdom) JB Ward (United Kingdom) Mrs Armstrong	3	6	3
(United Kingdom) A Prebble (United Kingdom) D Lambert Chambers	6	4	6
(United Kingdom) F Thomasson (United Kingdom) Mrs AG Wilkinson	1	4
(United Kingdom) Theodore Mavrogordato (United Kingdom) Mabel Parton	6	6
(United Kingdom) Harold Aitken (South Africa) Mrs CA Beck	11	3	5
(United Kingdom) Cecil Tindell-Green (United Kingdom) Kitty McKane	9	6	7

Third round
(United Kingdom) M Woosnam (United Kingdom) E Greville	4	1
(United Kingdom) A Prebble (United Kingdom) D Lambert Chambers	6	6
(United Kingdom) T Mavrogordato (United Kingdom) M Parton	6	6
(United Kingdom) C Tindell-Green (United Kingdom) K McKane	4	2

Quarterfinals
(United Kingdom) A Prebble (United Kingdom) D Lambert Chambers	6	8
(United Kingdom) T Mavrogordato (United Kingdom) M Parton	2	6

==== Section 4 ====
First round

Second round
(France) Max Decugis (Australia) Lily Addison	6	11
(United Kingdom) Royden Dash (United Kingdom) Olive Manser	3	9
(United Kingdom) Ivor Evans (United Kingdom) Margaret McKane	2	3
(United Kingdom) Alfred Hunter (United Kingdom) Blanche Colston	6	6
(United Kingdom) Hope Crisp (United Kingdom) Mrs Perrett	1	2
(United Kingdom) Arthur Lowe (United Kingdom) Gladys Lamplough	6	6
(United Kingdom) GTC Watt (United Kingdom) Winifred Beamish	6	6
(New Zealand) Frank Fisher; Mrs Hall Walker	3	1

Third round
(France) M Decugis (Australia) L Addison	6	6
(United Kingdom) A Hunter (United Kingdom) B Colston	4	3
(United Kingdom) A Lowe (United Kingdom) G Lamplough	2	4
(United Kingdom) GTC Watt (United Kingdom) W Beamish	6	6

Quarterfinals
(France) M Decugis (Australia) L Addison	6	6
(United Kingdom) GTC Watt (United Kingdom) W Beamish	3	1

The nationality of Mrs Hall Walker is unknown.
