= 1919 Wimbledon Championships – Women's singles =

Women's singles
- 1919 Wimbledon Championships

Final
- Champion: (France) Suzanne Lenglen
- Runner-up: (United Kingdom) Dorothea Lambert Chambers
- Score: 10–8, 4–6, 9–7

Details
- Draw: 43
- Seeds: –

Events
Singles	men	women		boys	girls
Doubles	men	women	mixed	boys	girls
← 1914 ·	Wimbledon Championships	· 1920 →

Suzanne Lenglen defeated Phyllis Satterthwaite 6–1, 6–1 in the All Comers' Final, and then defeated the reigning champion Dorothea Lambert Chambers 10–8, 4–6, 9–7 in the challenge round to win the ladies' singles tennis title at the 1919 Wimbledon Championships.

== Draw ==
=== Key ===
- Q = Qualifier
- WC = Wild card
- LL = Lucky loser
- Alt = Alternate
- SE = Special exempt
- PR = Protected ranking
- ITF = ITF entry
- JE = Junior exempt
- w/o = Walkover
- r = Retired
- d = Defaulted
- SR = Special ranking

=== Challenge round ===
Challenge round
(France) Suzanne Lenglen	10	4	9
(United Kingdom) Dorothea Lambert Chambers	8	6	7

=== All comers' finals ===
Quarterfinals
(United Kingdom) Winifred Beamish	6	6	6
(United Kingdom) Aurea Edgington	8	3	2
(United Kingdom) Ruth Winch	3	4
(United Kingdom) Phyllis Satterthwaite	6	6
(France) Suzanne Lenglen	6	6
(United Kingdom) Kitty McKane	0	1
(United States) Elizabeth Ryan	6	6
(United Kingdom) Mabel Parton	2	3

Semifinals
(United Kingdom) Winifred Beamish	4	8
(United Kingdom) Phyllis Satterthwaite	6	10
(France) Suzanne Lenglen	6	7
(United States) Elizabeth Ryan	4	5

Final
(United Kingdom) Phyllis Satterthwaite	1	1
(France) Suzanne Lenglen	6	6

=== Top half ===
==== Section 1 ====
First round

Second round
(United Kingdom) GB Foster	8	2	4
(United Kingdom) Mrs AG Wilkinson	6	6	6
(France) Doris Wolfson	2	4
(United Kingdom) Winifred Beamish	6	6
(United Kingdom) Madeline O'Neill	3	6
(United Kingdom) Charlotte Sterry	6	8
(United Kingdom) Edith Greville	4	2
(United Kingdom) Aurea Edgington	6	6

Third round
(United Kingdom) Mrs AG Wilkinson	5	12
(United Kingdom) W Beamish	7	14
(United Kingdom) C Sterry	6	11	3
(United Kingdom) A Edgington	8	9	6

Quarterfinals
(United Kingdom) W Beamish	6	6	6
(United Kingdom) A Edgington	8	3	2

==== Section 2 ====
First round
(United Kingdom) Ruth Winch
(United Kingdom) Mrs HB Silver	w/o
(United Kingdom) Helen Leisk	w/o
(United Kingdom) NB Palmer
(Australia) Lily Addison	6	6
(United Kingdom) Agnes Tuckey	3	1
(United Kingdom) Winifred McNair	6	6
(United Kingdom) Mrs Lamb	4	0
(United Kingdom) Phyllis Satterthwaite	6	6
(United Kingdom) Mrs AA Hall	0	0
(United Kingdom) Gladys Lamplough	6	6
(United Kingdom) Tessa Hall	3	2

Second round
(United Kingdom) Lavinia Radeglia	6	6	3
(United Kingdom) Peggy Dransfield	4	8	6
(United Kingdom) R Winch	6	6
(United Kingdom) NB Palmer	0	2
(Australia) L Addison	10	2
(United Kingdom) W McNair	12	6
(United Kingdom) P Satterthwaite	8	6
(United Kingdom) G Lamplough	6	4

Third round
(United Kingdom) P Dransfield	2	2
(United Kingdom) R Winch	6	6
(United Kingdom) W McNair	6	4
(United Kingdom) P Satterthwaite	8	6

Quarterfinals
(United Kingdom) R Winch	3	4
(United Kingdom) P Satterthwaite	6	6

=== Bottom half ===
==== Section 3 ====
First round
(United Kingdom) Susannah Willford	6	3
(South Africa) Mrs CA Beck	8	6
(United Kingdom) Doris Craddock	6	6
(United Kingdom) E Tighe	1	3
(United Kingdom) Ethel Larcombe	6	6
(United Kingdom) AG Ransome	0	1
(United Kingdom) Annie Cobb	0	1
(France) Suzanne Lenglen	6	6
(United Kingdom) Kitty McKane	6	7
(United Kingdom) Olive Manser	3	5

Second round
(South Africa) Mrs CA Beck	4	6	0
(United Kingdom) D Craddock	6	4	6
(United Kingdom) E Larcombe	2	1
(France) S Lenglen	6	6
(United Kingdom) K McKane	6	6
(United Kingdom) Blanche Colston	2	2
(United Kingdom) Dora Geen	w/o
(United Kingdom) Mrs E King

Third round
(United Kingdom) D Craddock	0	1
(France) S Lenglen	6	6
(United Kingdom) K McKane	6	6
(United Kingdom) Mrs E King	1	2

Quarterfinals
(France) S Lenglen	6	6
(United Kingdom) K McKane	0	1

==== Section 4 ====
First round

Second round
(United States) Elizabeth Ryan	6	6
(United Kingdom) Margaret McKane	1	4
(United Kingdom) MA Wright	w/o
(United Kingdom) Dorothy Holman
(United Kingdom) D Ballingal
(United Kingdom) Mrs HC Hextall	w/o
(United Kingdom) Mrs Perrett	1	4
(United Kingdom) Mabel Parton	6	6

Third round
(United States) E Ryan	8	6
(United Kingdom) D Holman	6	4
(United Kingdom) D Ballingal	0	2
(United Kingdom) M Parton	6	6

Quarterfinals
(United States) E Ryan	6	6
(United Kingdom) M Parton	2	3

Preceded by 1918 U.S. National Championships – Women's singles	Grand Slam women's singles	Succeeded by 1919 U.S. National Championships – Women's singles
