= 1914 Wimbledon Championships – Men's singles =

Men's singles
- 1914 Wimbledon Championships

Final
- Champion: (Australia) Norman Brookes
- Runner-up: (New Zealand) Anthony Wilding
- Score: 6–4, 6–4, 7–5

Details
- Draw: 102
- Seeds: –

Events
Singles	men	women		boys	girls
Doubles	men	women	mixed	boys	girls
← 1913 ·	Wimbledon Championships	· 1919 →

Norman Brookes defeated Otto Froitzheim 6–2, 6–1, 5–7, 4–6, 8–6 in the All Comers' Final, and then defeated the reigning champion Anthony Wilding 6–4, 6–4, 7–5 in the challenge round to win the gentlemen's singles tennis title at the 1914 Wimbledon Championships. It would be the last Wimbledon tournament for five years due to World War I.

== Draw ==
=== Key ===
- Q = Qualifier
- WC = Wild card
- LL = Lucky loser
- Alt = Alternate
- SE = Special exempt
- PR = Protected ranking
- ITF = ITF entry
- JE = Junior exempt
- w/o = Walkover
- r = Retired
- d = Defaulted
- SR = Special ranking

=== Challenge round ===
Challenge Round
(Australia) Norman Brookes	6	6	7
(New Zealand) Anthony Wilding	4	4	5

=== All-Comers' Finals ===
Quarterfinals
(Germany) Otto Froitzheim	5	6	9	6
(United Kingdom) James Cecil Parke	7	2	7	2
(United Kingdom) Theodore Mavrogordato	6	2	6	6
(France) Maurice Germot	3	6	4	1
(United Kingdom) Percival Davson	4	2	1
(United Kingdom) Alfred Beamish	6	6	6
(United Kingdom) Arthur Gore	5	1	2
(Australia) Norman Brookes	7	6	6

Semifinals
(Germany) Otto Froitzheim	6	6	7
(United Kingdom) Theodore Mavrogordato	3	2	5
(United Kingdom) Alfred Beamish	0	3	2
(Australia) Norman Brookes	6	6	6

Final
(Germany) Otto Froitzheim	2	1	7	6	6
(Australia) Norman Brookes	6	6	5	4	8

=== Top half ===
==== Section 1 ====
First round

Second round
(United Kingdom) Royden Dash
(United Kingdom) CH Hole	w/o
(Germany) Otto Froitzheim	6	3	6	6
(United Kingdom) Hope Crisp	2	6	2	2
(United Kingdom) Arthur Lowe	6	6	6
(United Kingdom) B Wood-Hill	2	0	1
(United States) Craig Biddle
(United Kingdom) LGO Woodhouse	w/o

Third round
(United Kingdom) R Dash	3	3	2
(Germany) O Froitzheim	6	6	6
(United Kingdom) A Lowe
(United States) C Biddle	w/o

Fourth round
(Germany) O Froitzheim	6	6	5	10
(United Kingdom) A Lowe	3	4	7	8

==== Section 2 ====
First round
(United Kingdom) James Cecil Parke	11	6	6
(United Kingdom) Charles Dixon	9	1	3
(United Kingdom) Gordon Lowe	6	6	8
(India) Sydney Jacob	2	4	6
(United Kingdom) Thomas Nicholson	6	6	8
(United Kingdom) A Weatherhead	4	3	6

Second round
(United Kingdom) George Caridia	6	5	6	6
(United Kingdom) Ernest Charlton	2	7	2	3
(United Kingdom) Richard Turnbull
(United Kingdom) JG Bill	w/o
(United Kingdom) GTC Watt	2	0	0^{r}
(United Kingdom) JC Parke	6	6	0
(United Kingdom) G Lowe	6	6	6
(United Kingdom) T Nicholson	3	4	2

Third round
(United Kingdom) G Caridia	7	6	6	6
(United Kingdom) R Turnbull	9	2	3	4
(United Kingdom) JC Parke	6	6	6
(United Kingdom) G Lowe	1	3	4

Fourth round
(United Kingdom) G Caridia	2	2	1
(United Kingdom) JC Parke	6	6	6

==== Section 3 ====
First round
(United Kingdom) Neville Willford	6	9	6
(United Kingdom) Percy Pinckney	3	7	4
(United Kingdom) Cedric Scott	6	8	6
(United Kingdom) F Good	1	6	3
(United Kingdom) RH Hotham
(United Kingdom) EJ Whittall	w/o
(United Kingdom) Cyril Eltringham
(Germany) Heinrich Kleinschroth	w/o
(United Kingdom) Theodore Mavrogordato	6	6	6
(United Kingdom) Noel Turnbull	4	0	4
(United Kingdom) Sydney Watts
(United Kingdom) G Franckenstein	w/o
(United Kingdom) Cecil Tindell Green	6	6	6
(United Kingdom) Roderick McNair	2	1	3
(Australia) Stanley Doust	6	6	6
(United Kingdom) Stanley Franklin	1	2	2

Second round
(United Kingdom) N Willford	5	3	8	4
(United Kingdom) C Scott	7	6	6	6
(United Kingdom) RH Hotham	3	10	2	1
(United Kingdom) C Eltringham	6	8	6	6
(United Kingdom) T Mavrogordato	6	6	6
(United Kingdom) S Watts	2	3	3
(United Kingdom) C Tindell Green	1	6	6	1	4
(Australia) S Doust	6	2	2	6	6

Third round
(United Kingdom) C Scott	10	9	4	6
(United Kingdom) C Eltringham	8	7	6	4
(United Kingdom) T Mavrogordato	6	6	6
(Australia) S Doust	0	4	4

Fourth round
(United Kingdom) C Scott	4	1	4
(United Kingdom) T Mavrogordato	6	6	6

==== Section 4 ====
First round
(France) Maurice Germot	6	6	6
(United Kingdom) Amphlett Davis	4	4	0
(United Kingdom) A Moss	4	8	6	3
(United Kingdom) RM Kidston	6	6	2	1^{r}
(United Kingdom) Charles Simond	6	6	6
(United Kingdom) Alfred Hunter	4	2	2
(United Kingdom) George Stoddart	6	6	6
(United Kingdom) JE Boyd	3	3	4
(Germany) Luis Maria Heyden	2	6	6	6
(United Kingdom) L Harvey	6	1	3	4
(United Kingdom) Mark Hick	6	6	6
(United Kingdom) RF Baird	0	0	3
(United Kingdom) Humphrey Milford
(Australia) ET Barnard	w/o
(Australia) Alfred Dunlop	6	6	6
(United Kingdom) Henry Wilson-Fox	2	2	0

Second round
(France) M Germot	6	6	6
(United Kingdom) A Moss	4	2	4
(United Kingdom) C Simond	0	4	2
(United Kingdom) G Stoddart	6	6	6
(Germany) LM Heyden	6	6	6
(United Kingdom) M Hick	2	2	4
(United Kingdom) H Milford	9	2	2	1
(Australia) A Dunlop	7	6	6	6

Third round
(France) M Germot	5	6	6	7
(United Kingdom) G Stoddart	7	2	0	5
(Germany) LM Heyden	6	6	5	1
(Australia) A Dunlop	8	0	7	6

Fourth round
(France) M Germot	6	6	6	4
(Australia) A Dunlop	8	4	1	1^{r}

=== Bottom half ===
==== Section 5 ====
First round
(United Kingdom) RWF Harding	6	6	6
(South Africa) Newton Thompson	3	2	2
(Denmark) Erik Larsen	6	6	6
(United Kingdom) Charles Gouldesborough	2	3	1
(United Kingdom) Douglas Watson	6	6	6
(United Kingdom) Edward Yencken	3	1	3
(United Kingdom) AJ Jiminez	6	7	1	0
(United Kingdom) Charles Tuckey	8	5	6	5^{r}
(United Kingdom) Harold Aitken	6	6	6
(United Kingdom) RH Somers Lewis	2	4	1
(France) Max Decugis	6	6	6
(United Kingdom) SF Thol	2	2	1
(United Kingdom) Percival Davson	6	6	4	6
(United Kingdom) TD Stoward	2	2	6	0
(United Kingdom) Peter Hicks	6	6	6
(United Kingdom) FW Last	3	4	1

Second round
(United Kingdom) RWF Harding	3	5	3
(Denmark) E Larsen	6	7	6
(United Kingdom) D Watson	6	6	6
(United Kingdom) AJ Jiminez	4	4	2
(United Kingdom) H Aitken	2	1	3
(France) M Decugis	6	6	6
(United Kingdom) P Davson	10	6	6
(United Kingdom) P Hicks	8	2	4

Third round
(Denmark) E Larsen	1	6	6	0	3
(United Kingdom) D Watson	6	2	2	6	6
(France) M Decugis	4	6	1	3
(United Kingdom) P Davson	6	4	6	6

Fourth round
(United Kingdom) D Watson	2	4	7	1
(United Kingdom) P Davson	6	6	5	6

==== Section 6 ====
First round
(United Kingdom) AJ Ross	6	7	6
(United Kingdom) Percy Tabbush	1	5	2
(United Kingdom) Walter Crawley	3	8	6	6
(United Kingdom) Scotter Owen	6	6	2	2
(United Kingdom) JB Ward	6	4	6	6
(United Kingdom) LS Lee	4	6	4	2
(United Kingdom) Fritz Goldberg	6	6	9
(United Kingdom) JD Fuller	1	1	7
(United Kingdom) AM Cooper	6	6	7
(United Kingdom) EA Stonor	2	2	5
(United Kingdom) John Flavelle	4	6	6	6
(United Kingdom) Charles Pritchett	6	3	3	3
(United Kingdom) Ernest Parton	6	6	7
(United Kingdom) Arthur Yencken	2	0	5
(United Kingdom) Alfred Beamish	6	6	6
(United Kingdom) EW Timmis	2	1	2

Second round
(United Kingdom) AJ Ross	1	3	2
(United Kingdom) W Crawley	6	6	6
(United Kingdom) JB Ward	2	3	2
(United Kingdom) F Goldberg	6	6	6
(United Kingdom) AM Cooper	11	1	6	7	5
(United Kingdom) J Flavelle	13	6	3	5	7
(United Kingdom) E Parton	1	1	3
(United Kingdom) A Beamish	6	6	6

Third round
(United Kingdom) W Crawley	6	6	0	6
(United Kingdom) F Goldberg	2	1	6	4
(United Kingdom) J Flavelle	2	2	0
(United Kingdom) A Beamish	6	6	6

Fourth round
(United Kingdom) W Crawley	2	5	4
(United Kingdom) A Beamish	6	7	6

==== Section 7 ====
First round
(United Kingdom) Algernon Kingscote	6	6	6
(United Kingdom) WD Barber	2	2	0
(United Kingdom) Arthur Gore	6	6	7
(United Kingdom) George Thomas	3	2	5
(United Kingdom) Frank Jarvis	6	8	3	6
(Germany) Robert Spiess	3	6	6	4

Second round
(United Kingdom) A Kingscote	4	3	3
(United Kingdom) A Gore	6	6	6
(United Kingdom) F Jarvis	6	6	6
(United Kingdom) HTL Speer	2	4	4
(United Kingdom) Ernest Pooley	7	1	5
(United Kingdom) Alfred Crawley	5	6	2^{r}
(United Kingdom) Leonard Lyle	9	6	6
(United Kingdom) AW Davson	7	4	4

Third round
(United Kingdom) A Gore	6	6	6
(United Kingdom) F Jarvis	3	3	2
(United Kingdom) E Pooley	1	0	4
(United Kingdom) L Lyle	6	6	6

Fourth round
(United Kingdom) A Gore	6	6	6
(United Kingdom) L Lyle	2	0	2

==== Section 8 ====
First round

Second round
(United Kingdom) William Clements	6	12	6
(United Kingdom) Alfred Ingram	2	10	0
(United Kingdom) CS Gordon-Smith	7	6	10
(Belgium) Paul de Borman	5	2	8
(Australia) Norman Brookes	6	6	6
(United Kingdom) LF Davin	0	0	0
(United Kingdom) Major Ritchie	4	6	6	6
(United Kingdom) Herbert Roper Barrett	6	1	4	3

Third round
(United Kingdom) W Clements	6	3	6	3	6
(United Kingdom) CS Gordon-Smith	3	6	4	6	3
(Australia) N Brookes	6	6	6
(United Kingdom) M Ritchie	1	0	1

Fourth round
(United Kingdom) W Clements	3	0	0
(Australia) N Brookes	6	6	6

Preceded by 1913 Australasian Championships – Men's singles	Grand Slam men's singles	Succeeded by 1914 U.S. National Championships – Men's singles
