= 1919 Wimbledon Championships – Men's singles =

Men's singles
- 1919 Wimbledon Championships

Final
- Champion: (Australia) Gerald Patterson
- Runner-up: (Australia) Norman Brookes
- Score: 6–3, 7–5, 6–2

Details
- Draw: 128
- Seeds: –

Events
Singles	men	women		boys	girls
Doubles	men	women	mixed	boys	girls
- Wimbledon Championships

Gerald Patterson defeated Algernon Kingscote 6–2, 6–1, 6–3 in the All Comers' Final, and then defeated the reigning champion Norman Brookes 6–3, 7–5, 6–2 in the challenge round to win the gentlemen's singles tennis title at the 1919 Wimbledon Championships.

== Draw ==
Key

- Q = Qualifier
- WC = Wild card
- LL = Lucky loser
- Alt = Alternate
- ITF = ITF entry
- PR = Protected ranking
- SR = Special ranking
- SE = Special exempt
- JE = Junior exempt
- JR = Junior Accelerator Programme entrant
- CO = College Accelerator Programme entrant
- NG = Next Gen Accelerator Program entrant
- w/o = Walkover
- r = Retired
- d = Defaulted

=== Challenge round ===
Challenge Round
(Australia) Gerald Patterson	6	7	6
(Australia) Norman Brookes	3	5	2

=== All-Comers' Finals ===
Quarterfinals
(United Kingdom) Charles Dixon	6	4	3	3
(United Kingdom) Major Ritchie	4	6	6	6
(France) André Gobert	8	3	2
(Australia) Gerald Patterson	10	6	6
(United Kingdom) Algernon Kingscote	6	3	6	1	6
(Australia) Pat O'Hara Wood	4	6	3	6	4
(United States) Chuck Garland	6	6	6
(Australia) Ronald Thomas	4	0	1

Semifinals
(United Kingdom) Major Ritchie	1	5	6	3
(Australia) Gerald Patterson	6	7	1	6
(United Kingdom) Algernon Kingscote	6	6	2	5	6
(United States) Chuck Garland	1	4	6	7	4

Final
(Australia) Gerald Patterson	6	6	6
(United Kingdom) Algernon Kingscote	2	1	3

=== Top half ===
==== Section 1 ====
First round
(United Kingdom) Neville Deed	4	6	4	7	5
(United Kingdom) Pullen Thompson	6	2	6	5	7
(South Africa) D Beningfield	6	6	6
(United Kingdom) WP Haviland	4	3	2
(United Kingdom) Alfred Ingram	4	4	1
(United Kingdom) Charles Dixon	6	6	6
(United Kingdom) Neville Field
(United Kingdom) RD England	w/o
(South Africa) Louis Raymond	6	6	6
(United Kingdom) Glen Walker	0	1	1
(United States) Dean Mathey	6	6	6
(United Kingdom) JCF Simpson	3	0	0
(United States) JS Brown	7	6	4	6
(United Kingdom) AC Wiswell	5	3	6	2
(United States) George Wrenn	w/o
(United Kingdom) Sam O'Donnell

Second round
(United Kingdom) P Thompson	5	1	3
(South Africa) H Beningfield	7	6	6
(United Kingdom) C Dixon	6	6	6
(United Kingdom) N Field	1	2	2
(South Africa) L Raymond	6	2	4	1
(United States) D Mathey	3	6	6	6
(United States) JS Brown	4	7	6	6
(United Kingdom) S O'Donnell	6	5	4	4

Third round
(South Africa) D Beningfield	2	4	1
(United Kingdom) C Dixon	6	6	6
(United States) D Mathey	6	7	6
(United States) JS Brown	3	5	0

Fourth round
(United Kingdom) C Dixon	6	7	5	6
(United States) D Mathey	4	5	7	3

==== Section 2 ====
First round
(United Kingdom) F Thomasson	3	2	8
(United Kingdom) H Sharpe	6	6	10
(United Kingdom) Philip Glover	w/o
(Australia) HL Addison
(United Kingdom) GTC Watt	6	6	6
(United Kingdom) Ivor Evans	3	1	2
(United Kingdom) Frank Jarvis	2	4	7	6	6
(United Kingdom) Arthur Gore	6	6	5	4	2
(United Kingdom) Cecil Tindell-Green	8	8	7
(United Kingdom) AH West	6	6	5
(United Kingdom) J Robinson	2	1	0
(United Kingdom) Major Ritchie	6	6	6
(United States) John Cannon	7	6	6
(United Kingdom) Amphlett Davis	5	4	3
(Australia) BE Henty
(United Kingdom) LF Davin	w/o

Second round
(United Kingdom) H Sharpe	6	4	8	6
(Australia) HL Addison	2	6	6	3
(United Kingdom) GTC Watt	3	3	0^{r}
(United Kingdom) F Jarvis	6	6	0
(United Kingdom) C Tindell-Green	5	8	2	2
(United Kingdom) M Ritchie	7	6	6	6
(United States) J Cannon	7	6	1	6
(Australia) BE Henty	5	1	6	1

Third round
(United Kingdom) H Sharpe	2	4	3
(United Kingdom) F Jarvis	6	6	6
(United Kingdom) M Ritchie	6	6	6
(United States) J Cannon	2	1	4

Fourth round
(United Kingdom) F Jarvis	1	4	6	2
(United Kingdom) M Ritchie	6	6	4	6

==== Section 3 ====
First round
(United Kingdom) John Flavelle	1	2^{r}
(United States) Arthur Lovibond	6	2
(Romania) Nicolae Mișu	1	4	4
(France) André Gobert	6	6	6
(United Kingdom) Mark Hick	8	6	6	6	6
(United Kingdom) CL Philcox	10	8	3	2	2
(United Kingdom) Geoffrey Youll	0	0	1
(United Kingdom) Frank Donisthorpe	6	6	6
(United Kingdom) WC Youll	2	6	2
(United Kingdom) Max Woosnam	6	8	6
(United Kingdom) Stanley Franklin	w/o
(Australia) Rodney Heath
(United Kingdom) George Birtles	6	6	6
(United Kingdom) P Byrne	2	1	2
(United Kingdom) Leonard Lyle	1	2	1
(South Africa) Brian Norton	6	6	6

Second round
(United States) A Lovibond	2	2	4
(France) A Gobert	6	6	6
(United Kingdom) M Hick	6	5	5	3
(United Kingdom) F Donisthorpe	3	7	7	6
(United Kingdom) M Woosnam	4	3	5
(Australia) R Heath	6	6	7
(United Kingdom) G Birtles	2	0	0
(South Africa) B Norton	6	6	6

Third round
(France) A Gobert	10	6	6	6
(United Kingdom) F Donisthorpe	12	2	0	2
(Australia) R Heath	5	3	6	6	6
(South Africa) B Norton	7	6	1	4	2

Fourth round
(France) A Gobert	3	6	6	6
(Australia) R Heath	6	4	4	1

==== Section 4 ====
First round
(United Kingdom) Arthur Lowe
(United Kingdom) HR Fussell	w/o
(United Kingdom) F Laxon	1	2	1
(United Kingdom) Theodore Mavrogordato	6	6	6
(Australia) Gerald Patterson	6	6	6
(United Kingdom) HJ Gilbert	0	4	0
(Netherlands) LA Nypels	3	4	3
(United Kingdom) Herbert Roper Barrett	6	6	6
(United Kingdom) AH Erskine Lindop	0	4	0
(United Kingdom) EG Bisseker	6	6	6
(United States) AW Asthalter	6	1	2	6	6
(United Kingdom) AW Davson	1	6	6	2	4
(Australia) Stanley Doust	6	6	2
(United Kingdom) Gerald Chesterman	0	2	1^{r}
(United Kingdom) Frank Riseley	6	6	6
(United Kingdom) Clinton McIlquham	1	3	2

Second round
(United Kingdom) A Lowe	7	11	2	1	3
(United Kingdom) T Mavrogordato	5	9	6	6	6
(Australia) G Patterson	7	6	7
(United Kingdom) HR Barrett	5	2	5
(United Kingdom) EG Bisseker	9	6	6
(United States) AW Asthalter	7	4	4
(Australia) S Doust	1	9	6	6	6
(United Kingdom) F Riseley	6	7	8	4	1

Third round
(United Kingdom) T Mavrogordato	0	3	5
(Australia) G Patterson	6	6	7
(United Kingdom) EG Bisseker	4	1	5
(Australia) S Doust	6	6	7

Fourth round
(Australia) G Patterson	6	6	6
(Australia) S Doust	2	0	2

=== Bottom half ===
==== Section 5 ====
First round
(United Kingdom) Alfred Hunter	6	6	6
(United Kingdom) B Wood-Hill	3	3	2
(Canada) Henry Mayes	w/o
(United Kingdom) VS Erskine Lindop
(United Kingdom) Algernon Kingscote	7	6	6
(France) William Laurentz	5	3	1
(United Kingdom) HB Silver	1	1	1
(United Kingdom) Noel Turnbull	6	6	6
(France) Max Decugis	6	6	6
(United Kingdom) SF Thol	4	0	4
(United Kingdom) E Morris Hall	7	6	2	1	3
(United Kingdom) Leighton Crawford	5	3	6	6	6
(United Kingdom) R James	7	6	6
(United Kingdom) CA McConchie	5	0	1
(United Kingdom) Harold King	1	0	3
(United Kingdom) CS Grace	6	6	6

Second round
(United Kingdom) A Hunter	6	6	6
(United Kingdom) VS Erskine Lindop	2	2	4
(United Kingdom) A Kingscote	6	6	6
(United Kingdom) N Turnbull	0	3	1
(France) M Decugis	6	4	5	10	6
(United Kingdom) FRL Crawford	2	6	7	8	1
(United Kingdom) R James	3	4	2
(United Kingdom) CS Grace	6	6	6

Third round
(United Kingdom) A Hunter	1	2	2
(United Kingdom) A Kingscote	6	6	6
(France) M Decugis	6	6	6
(United Kingdom) CS Grace	0	1	3

Fourth round
(United Kingdom) A Kingscote	6	4	4	8	8
(France) M Decugis	2	6	6	6	6

==== Section 6 ====
First round
(South Africa) George Dodd	6	6	6
(United Kingdom) Richard Turnbull	1	2	2
(United Kingdom) Scotter Owen	6	0	6	7	6
(United Kingdom) RH Hotham	8	6	2	5	2
(United Kingdom) HC Breck	w/o
(United Kingdom) Robert Walker
(United Kingdom) George Thomas	1	8	4	7	3
(Australia) Pat O'Hara Wood	6	6	6	5	6
(United Kingdom) Arthur Zorab	6	6	6
(United Kingdom) MRL White	4	2	4
(United Kingdom) Ernest Parton	6	6	6
(United Kingdom) TM McAvity	3	4	4
(United Kingdom) Harold Aitken	6	6	6
(United Kingdom) Percy Tabbush	2	3	1
(United States) Watson Washburn	6	6	3	6
(South Africa) DH Mellet	1	3	6	1

Second round
(South Africa) G Dodd	6	6	6
(United Kingdom) S Owen	1	4	2
(United Kingdom) R Walker	1	0	2
(Australia) P O'Hara Wood	6	6	6
(India) A Zorab	7	6	3	4
(United Kingdom) E Parton	9	2	6	6
(United Kingdom) H Aitken	6	8	0	4
(United States) W Washburn	8	6	6	6

Third round
(South Africa) G Dodd	7	6	4	1
(Australia) P O'Hara Wood	5	8	6	6
(United Kingdom) E Parton	3	5	8	3
(United States) W Washburn	6	7	6	6

Fourth round
(Australia) P O'Hara Wood	12	6	6	4	6
(United States) W Washburn	14	3	4	6	3

==== Section 7 ====
First round
(United Kingdom) Ambrose Dudley	1	1	3
(United Kingdom) Walter Crawley	6	6	6
(Netherlands) Gerard Scheurleer	w/o
(United Kingdom) George Cartwright
(United States) Louis Graves	6	6	6
(United Kingdom) Neville Willford	4	3	3
(United Kingdom) CBB Smith-Bingham	4	6	6	3	6
(United Kingdom) Bill Swinden	6	2	4	6	4
(United Kingdom) Royden Dash	6	6	6
(United Kingdom) CW Tabbush	2	1	0
(United Kingdom) Henry Martin	6	6	3	6
(United Kingdom) V Crawshaw	4	2	6	1
(United Kingdom) Ernest Black	2	2	4
(New Zealand) Frank Fisher	6	6	6
(United Kingdom) E Borrett	0	0	1
(United States) Chuck Garland	6	6	6

Second round
(United Kingdom) W Crawley	6	6	6
(United Kingdom) G Cartwright	2	4	1
(United States) L Graves	6	6	6
(United Kingdom) CBB Smith-Bingham	4	4	0
(United Kingdom) R Dash	6	6	6
(United Kingdom) H Martin	1	4	3
(New Zealand) F Fisher	w/o
(United States) C Garland

Third round
(United Kingdom) W Crawley	0	6	6
(United States) L Graves	6	8	8
(United Kingdom) R Dash	3	0	2
(United States) C Garland	6	6	6

Fourth round
(United States) L Graves	0	6	6	2
(United States) C Garland	6	8	3	6

==== Section 8 ====
First round
(Australia) Ronald Thomas	6	2	6	6	9
(United Kingdom) John Cecil Masterman	4	6	3	8	7
(United States) Clarence Griffin	6	6	6
(United Kingdom) JB Ward	2	2	0
(United Kingdom) LD Edwards	0	2	2
(South Africa) Newton Thompson	6	6	6
(United Kingdom) Ernest Seale	6	8	6
(Netherlands) EG de Seriere	0	6	4
(United Kingdom) FH Teall	6	6	6
(United Kingdom) JH Harris	1	4	0
(United States) Willis Davis	6	5	2	6	6
(United Kingdom) Percival Davson	2	7	6	2	2
(United Kingdom) Ulysses Williams	9	3	2
(United Kingdom) George Stoddart	11	6	6
(United Kingdom) BV Stacy
(United Kingdom) Walter Bersey	w/o

Second round
(Australia) R Thomas	5	2	6	7	7
(United States) C Griffin	7	6	4	5	5
(South Africa) N Thompson	6	6	7
(United Kingdom) E Seale	2	1	5
(United Kingdom) FH Teall	0	7	4	0
(United States) W Davis	6	5	6	6
(United Kingdom) G Stoddart	6	6	4	6
(United Kingdom) BV Stacy	1	1	6	1

Third round
(Australia) R Thomas	6	8	6
(South Africa) N Thompson	2	6	2
(United States) W Davis	6	6	6
(United Kingdom) G Stoddart	2	4	2

Fourth round
(Australia) R Thomas	2	7	7	6
(United States) W Davis	6	5	5	2

Preceded by 1919 Australasian Championships – Singles	Grand Slam men's singles	Succeeded by 1919 U.S. National Championships – Men's singles
