= 1919 Wimbledon Championships – Men's doubles =

Men's doubles
- 1919 Wimbledon Championships

Final
- Champions: (Australia) Pat O'Hara Wood (Australia) Ronald Thomas
- Runners-up: (Australia) Rodney Heath (Australia) Randolph Lycett
- Score: 6–4, 6–2, 4–6, 6–2

Details
- Draw: 55
- Seeds: –

Events
Singles	men	women		boys	girls
Doubles	men	women	mixed	boys	girls
- Wimbledon Championships

Norman Brookes and Anthony Wilding were the defending champions, but Wilding was killed during World War I. Brookes partnered with Gerald Patterson but they lost in the semifinals to eventual champions Pat O'Hara Wood and Ronald Thomas.

O'Hara Wood and Thomas defeated Rodney Heath and Randolph Lycett in the final, 6–4, 6–2, 4–6, 6–2 to win the gentlemen's doubles tennis title at the 1919 Wimbledon Championships.

== Draw ==
Key

- Q = Qualifier
- WC = Wild card
- LL = Lucky loser
- Alt = Alternate
- ITF = ITF entry
- PR = Protected ranking
- SR = Special ranking
- SE = Special exempt
- JE = Junior exempt
- JR = Junior Accelerator Programme entrant
- CO = College Accelerator Programme entrant
- NG = Next Gen Accelerator Program entrant
- w/o = Walkover
- r = Retired
- d = Defaulted

=== Finals ===
Quarterfinals
(United Kingdom) Leighton Crawford (United Kingdom) Cecil Tindell-Green	6	3	7	3
(New Zealand) Frank Fisher (United Kingdom) Major Ritchie	3	6	9	6
(United States) John Cannon (United States) Chuck Garland	1	5	4
(Australia) Rodney Heath (Australia) Randolph Lycett	6	7	6
(Australia) Pat O'Hara Wood (Australia) Ronald Thomas	7	6	4	6
(United States) Willis Davis (United States) Clarence Griffin	5	3	6	3
(Australia) Norman Brookes (Australia) Gerald Patterson	6	6	6
(United Kingdom) Charles Dixon (United Kingdom) Frank Riseley	3	2	1

Semifinals
(New Zealand) Frank Fisher (United Kingdom) Major Ritchie	10	6	3
(Australia) Rodney Heath (Australia) Randolph Lycett	12	8	6
(Australia) Pat O'Hara Wood (Australia) Ronald Thomas	6	6	3	6
(Australia) Norman Brookes (Australia) Gerald Patterson	4	4	6	3

Final
(Australia) Rodney Heath (Australia) Randolph Lycett	4	2	6	2
(Australia) Pat O'Hara Wood (Australia) Ronald Thomas	6	6	4	6

=== Top half ===
==== Section 1 ====
First round
(New Zealand) Frank Fisher (United Kingdom) Major Ritchie	6	6	6
(United Kingdom) E Borrett (United Kingdom) Robert Walker	0	0	1
(United States) AW Asthalter (United States) Arthur Lovibond	8	6	1	3
(United Kingdom) Herbert Roper Barrett (United Kingdom) Arthur Gore	6	8	6	6
(United Kingdom) Royden Dash (United Kingdom) CL Philcox	4	6	6	9
(United Kingdom) George Cartwright (United Kingdom) GR Westmacott	6	4	2	7
(United Kingdom) WP Haviland (United Kingdom) Pullen Thompson	10	4	2	4
(United Kingdom) SF Thol (United Kingdom) AH West	8	6	6	6

Second round
(United Kingdom) Arthur Lowe (United Kingdom) GTC Watt
(United Kingdom) John Cecil Masterman (Australia) JN Radcliffe	w/o
(United Kingdom) Leighton Crawford (United Kingdom) Cecil Tindell-Green	7	6	6
(United Kingdom) Geoffrey Youll (United Kingdom) WC Youll	5	2	2
(New Zealand) F Fisher (United Kingdom) M Ritchie	6	7	6
(United Kingdom) HR Barrett (United Kingdom) A Gore	2	5	2
(United Kingdom) R Dash (United Kingdom) CL Philcox	6	7	6
(United Kingdom) SF Thol (United Kingdom) AH West	2	5	4

Third round
(United Kingdom) A Lowe (United Kingdom) GTC Watt	6	4	6	5	3
(United Kingdom) FRL Crawford (United Kingdom) C Tindell-Green	4	6	1	7	6
(New Zealand) F Fisher (United Kingdom) M Ritchie	6	7	6
(United Kingdom) R Dash (United Kingdom) CL Philcox	2	5	2

Quarterfinals
(United Kingdom) FRL Crawford (United Kingdom) C Tindell-Green	6	3	7	3
(New Zealand) F Fisher (United Kingdom) M Ritchie	3	6	9	6

==== Section 2 ====
First round
(United Kingdom) Percy Oakley (United Kingdom) MRL White	6	6	8	3
(United States) John Cannon (United States) Chuck Garland	8	0	10	6
G Fisher; CGM Plumer	4	2	1
(Australia) BE Henty (United Kingdom) Henry Martin	6	6	6
(United Kingdom) Clinton McIlquham (United Kingdom) Ernest Seale	6	6	7
(United Kingdom) St John Killery (United Kingdom) W Reid	2	2	5
(United Kingdom) G Gouldesborough (United Kingdom) H Sharpe
(South Africa) Brian Norton (South Africa) Louis Raymond	w/o
(United Kingdom) TM McAvity (United Kingdom) AC Wiswell	4	2	4
(United Kingdom) Harold Aitken (South Africa) George Dodd	6	6	6
(South Africa) Newton Thompson (United Kingdom) Max Woosnam	9	2	6	4
(Australia) Rodney Heath (Australia) Randolph Lycett	7	6	8	6
(South Africa) Hector Daniel (South Africa) John Daniel	w/o
(United Kingdom) George Ball-Greene (United Kingdom) Clement Cazalet
(United Kingdom) Alfred Ingram (United Kingdom) Leonard Lyle	7	6	6
(United Kingdom) BV Stacy (United Kingdom) Glen Walker	5	3	4

Second round
(United States) J Cannon (United States) C Garland	6	6	6
(Australia) BE Henty (United Kingdom) H Martin	4	3	2
(United Kingdom) C McIlquham (United Kingdom) E Seale	7	6	6
(United Kingdom) G Gouldesborough (United Kingdom) H Sharpe	5	4	2
(United Kingdom) H Aitken (South Africa) G Dodd	6	6	1	6	2
(Australia) R Heath (Australia) R Lycett	8	3	6	3	6
(United Kingdom) G Ball-Greene (United Kingdom) CH Cazalet	0	4	3
(United Kingdom) A Ingram (United Kingdom) L Lyle	6	6	6

Third round
(United States) J Cannon (United States) C Garland	6	6	6
(United Kingdom) C McIlquham (United Kingdom) E Seale	0	2	1
(Australia) R Heath (Australia) R Lycett	6	7	6
(United Kingdom) A Ingram (United Kingdom) L Lyle	4	5	2

Quarterfinals
(United States) J Cannon (United States) C Garland	1	5	4
(Australia) R Heath (Australia) R Lycett	6	7	6

The nationality of G Fisher and CGM Plumer are unknown.

=== Bottom half ===
==== Section 3 ====
First round
(Australia) Pat O'Hara Wood (Australia) Ronald Thomas	6	6	6
(United Kingdom) Algernon Kingscote (United Kingdom) Albert Prebble	2	2	3
(United States) Dean Mathey (United States) Watson Washburn	6	6	6	3	6
(United Kingdom) Noel Turnbull (United Kingdom) Richard Turnbull	3	2	8	6	2
(United Kingdom) Percival Davson (United Kingdom) Theodore Mavrogordato	6	6	6
(United Kingdom) R James (United Kingdom) JB Ward	2	4	2
(United Kingdom) N Field (United Kingdom) FH Teall
(United Kingdom) Ernest Black (Canada) Henry Mayes	w/o
(United Kingdom) George Birtles (United Kingdom) EG Bisseker	4	2	6	5
(United Kingdom) Frank Donisthorpe (United Kingdom) CS Grace	6	6	7
(United Kingdom) Scotter Owen (United Kingdom) Ulysses Williams	6	5	2	11	2
(United Kingdom) Mark Hick (United Kingdom) Neville Willford	3	7	6	9	6
(United States) JS Brown (United States) Louis Graves
(United Kingdom) LD Edwards; JM Gatherall	w/o
(United States) Willis Davis (United States) Clarence Griffin
(United Kingdom) William Clements (United Kingdom) George Thomas	w/o

Second round
(Australia) P O'Hara Wood (Australia) R Thomas	6	6	6
(United States) D Mathey (United States) W Washburn	2	4	1
(United Kingdom) P Davson (United Kingdom) T Mavrogordato	7	6	4	6
(United Kingdom) N Field (United Kingdom) FH Teall	5	3	6	2
(United Kingdom) F Donisthorpe (United Kingdom) CS Grace	6	6	6
(United Kingdom) M Hick (United Kingdom) N Willford	3	4	3
(United States) JS Brown (United States) L Graves	2	4	3
(United States) W Davis (United States) C Griffin	6	6	6

Third round
(Australia) P O'Hara Wood (Australia) R Thomas	2	7	3	6	9
(United Kingdom) P Davson (United Kingdom) T Mavrogordato	6	5	6	4	7
(United Kingdom) F Donisthorpe (United Kingdom) CS Grace	6	3	8	2
(United States) W Davis (United States) C Griffin	3	6	10	6

Quarterfinals
(Australia) P O'Hara Wood (Australia) R Thomas	7	6	4	6
(United States) W Davis (United States) C Griffin	5	3	6	3

The nationality of JM Gatherall is unknown.

==== Section 4 ====
First round
(United Kingdom) Amphlett Davis (United Kingdom) Francis Stowe
(United Kingdom) John Flavelle (United Kingdom) AJ Jimenez	w/o
(Netherlands) Gerard Scheurleer (Netherlands) EG de Seriere	1	2	1
(Australia) Norman Brookes (Australia) Gerald Patterson	6	6	6
(United Kingdom) Ambrose Dudley (Romania) Nicolae Mișu	9	6	6
(United Kingdom) Dan Hanbury (United Kingdom) Arthur Zorab	7	1	3

Second round
(United Kingdom) A Davis (United Kingdom) FT Stowe	2	1	1
(Australia) N Brookes (Australia) G Patterson	6	6	6
(United Kingdom) A Dudley (Romania) N Mișu	6	6	6
(United Kingdom) RH Hotham (United Kingdom) CBB Smith-Bingham	1	1	1
(United Kingdom) Hamilton Price (United Kingdom) George Stoddart	4	0	2
(United Kingdom) Charles Dixon (United Kingdom) Frank Riseley	6	6	6
(United Kingdom) AH Erskine Lindop (United Kingdom) VS Erskine Lindop	3	1	3
(France) Max Decugis (France) William Laurentz	6	6	6

Third round
(Australia) N Brookes (Australia) G Patterson	6	6	7
(United Kingdom) A Dudley (Romania) N Mișu	0	0	5
(United Kingdom) C Dixon (United Kingdom) F Riseley	6	2	4	6	6
(France) M Decugis (France) W Laurentz	3	6	6	4	3

Quarterfinals
(Australia) N Brookes (Australia) G Patterson	6	6	6
(United Kingdom) C Dixon (United Kingdom) F Riseley	3	2	1
