= 1919 Wimbledon Championships =

- Date: 23 June – 7 July
- Edition: 39th
- Category: Grand Slam
- Surface: Grass
- Location: Worple Road; SW19, Wimbledon, London, United Kingdom
- Venue: All England Lawn Tennis and Croquet Club

Champions

Men's singles
- (Australia) Gerald Patterson

Women's singles
- (France) Suzanne Lenglen

Men's doubles
- (Australia) Ronald Thomas / (Australia) Pat O'Hara Wood

Women's doubles
- (France) Suzanne Lenglen / (United States) Elizabeth Ryan

Mixed doubles
- (Australia) Randolph Lycett / (United States) Elizabeth Ryan
- Wimbledon Championships

The 1919 Wimbledon Championships took place on the outdoor grass courts at the All England Lawn Tennis and Croquet Club in Wimbledon, London, United Kingdom. The tournament ran from 23 June until 7 July. It was the 39th staging of the Wimbledon Championships, and the first Grand Slam tennis event of 1919. It was the first Wimbledon championship after a four-year hiatus due to World War I.

== Champions ==
=== Men's singles ===
(Australia) Gerald Patterson defeated (Australia) Norman Brookes 6–3, 7–5, 6–2

=== Women's singles ===
(France) Suzanne Lenglen defeated (United Kingdom) Dorothea Lambert Chambers 10–8, 4–6, 9–7

=== Men's doubles ===
(Australia) Ronald Thomas / (Australia) Pat O'Hara Wood defeated (Australia) Rodney Heath / (Australia) Randolph Lycett, 6–4, 6–2, 4–6, 6–2

=== Women's doubles ===
(France) Suzanne Lenglen / (United States) Elizabeth Ryan defeated (United Kingdom) Dorothea Lambert Chambers / (United Kingdom) Ethel Larcombe, 4–6, 7–5, 6–3

=== Mixed doubles ===
(Australia) Randolph Lycett / (United States) Elizabeth Ryan defeated (United Kingdom) Albert Prebble / (United Kingdom) Dorothea Lambert Chambers, 6–0, 6–0

| Preceded by 1918 U.S. National Championships | Grand Slams | Succeeded by 1919 U.S. National Championships |
