= 1914 Wimbledon Championships =

- Date: June 22 – July 4
- Edition: 38th
- Category: Grand Slam
- Surface: Grass
- Location: Worple Road; SW20, Wimbledon, London, United Kingdom
- Venue: All England Lawn Tennis and Croquet Club

Champions

Men's singles
- (Australia) Norman Brookes

Women's singles
- (United Kingdom) Dorothea Lambert Chambers

Men's doubles
- (Australia) Norman Brookes / (New Zealand) Anthony Wilding

Women's doubles
- (United Kingdom) Agnes Morton / (United States) Elizabeth Ryan

Mixed doubles
- (United Kingdom) James Cecil Parke / (United Kingdom) Ethel Larcombe
- Wimbledon Championships

The 1914 Wimbledon Championships took place on the outdoor grass courts at the All England Lawn Tennis and Croquet Club in Wimbledon, London, United Kingdom. The tournament ran from 22 June until 4 July. It was the 38th staging of the Wimbledon Championships, and the first Grand Slam tennis event of 1914. It was the last championship before a four-year hiatus due to World War I.

== Champions ==
=== Men's singles ===
(Australia) Norman Brookes defeated (New Zealand) Anthony Wilding 6–4, 6–4, 7–5

=== Women's singles ===
(United Kingdom) Dorothea Lambert Chambers defeated (United Kingdom) Ethel Thomson Larcombe 7–5, 6–4

=== Men's doubles ===
(Australia) Norman Brookes / (New Zealand) Anthony Wilding defeated (United Kingdom) Herbert Roper Barrett / (United Kingdom) Charles Dixon 6–1, 6–1, 5–7, 8–6

=== Women's doubles ===
(United Kingdom) Agnes Morton / (United States) Elizabeth Ryan defeated (United Kingdom) Edith Hannam / (United Kingdom) Ethel Larcombe 6–1, 6–3

=== Mixed doubles ===
(United Kingdom) James Cecil Parke / (United Kingdom) Ethel Larcombe defeated (New Zealand) Anthony Wilding / (France) Marguerite Broquedis 4–6, 6–4, 6–2

Preceded by 1913 Australasian Championships	Grand Slams	Succeeded by 1914 U.S. National Championships
