= F. R. Leighton Crawford =

British tennis player (1886–1954)

- Full name: Francis Riou Leighton Crawford
- Country (sports): Great Britain
- Born: 5 August 1886; Ceylon
- Died: 5 January 1954 (aged 67)

Singles

Grand Slam singles results
- Wimbledon: 3R (1924)
- US Open: 3R (1923)

Doubles

Grand Slam doubles results
- Wimbledon: QF (1919, 1925)

Francis Riou Leighton Crawford (5 August 1886 – 5 January 1954) was a British tennis player

Born in Ceylon, Crawford was the eldest son of civil servant Henry Leighton Crawford, who served as Controller of Revenue in the Ceylon Civil Service. His younger brother, mountaineer Colin Grant Crawford, was a member of both the 1922 and 1933 Mount Everest expeditions.

Crawford won the Wimbledon Plate in 1919 and was a two-time Wimbledon doubles quarter-finalist. In 1922 he beat Major Ritchie in the final of the Sussex Championships. He was the single champion at Monte Carlo in 1924.

As a member of the Indian Police, Crawford was eligible to compete for India in Davis Cup competition and in 1922 was offered a place on the team, which he turned down.
