= Savoy Championships =

Savoy Championships Championnats de Savoie

Defunct tennis tournament
- Tour: ILTF Circuit (1913-38)
- Founded: 1908; 117 years ago
- Abolished: 1938; 87 years ago
- Location: Hôtel Ermitage, Évian-les-Bains, Haute-Savoie, France
- Venue: Tennis Club de l'Ermitage
- Surface: Clay (outdoors)

The Savoy Championships or Championnats de Savoie was a men's and women's open international clay court tennis tournament founded in 1908 and first staged at the Hôtel Ermitage, Évian-les-Bains, Haute-Savoie, France the tournament ran until 1938.

== History ==
The Savoy Championships were established in August 1908 and was first played at the Tennis Club de l'Ermitage, Évian-les-Bains, Haute-Savoie, France. The tournament was held until 1938 when it was discontinued due to the Hôtel Ermitage being sold off, and with the advent of World War II.

The former hotel later became a hospital in the 1950s. Following the second world war a new successor tournament the Évian-les-Bains International was established in 1952 that event ran until 1968. In 1991 Evian the French bottled water company bought the building and reopened it as the Hotel Ermitage Evian Resort, the four clay courts of the former tennis club were rebuilt.
