= Aurea Edgington =

English tennis player

- Full name: Aurea Farrington Edgington
- Country (sports): GBR
- Born: 21 February 1878 Ottery St Mary, Devon, England
- Died: 27 April 1967 (age 89) England
- Turned pro: 1900 (amateur tour)
- Retired: 1930

Singles
- Career titles: 43

Grand Slam singles results
- Wimbledon: SF (1909)

Doubles

Grand Slam doubles results
- Wimbledon: OF (1914, 1920)

Aurea Edgington (21 February 1878 – 27 April 1967) (née Aurea Farrington) was a British tennis player originally from Ottery St Mary, Devon, England. She was active from 1900 to 1930. She was a semi finalist in the women's singles at the 1909 Wimbledon Championships as well as a four time quarter finalist in 1910, 1911, 1919 and 1922.

She won 43 career singles titles most of which were on clay courts playing on the British and European circuit in France and Switzerland.

== Career ==
Aurea was born on 21 February 1878 in Ottery St Mary, Devon, England. In major tournaments she competed at Wimbledon 18 times between 1904 and 1929. At the 1909 Wimbledon Championships she reached the semi-finals before losing to Agnes Morton in straight sets. She then reached the quarter-finals of the 1910 Wimbledon Championships where she lost to Winifred McNair in three sets, then 1911 Wimbledon Championships where she was beaten by Dora Boothby by two sets to love, the 1919 Wimbledon Championships losing to Winifred Beamish finally the 1922 Wimbledon Championships where she lost to the Norwegian-American player Molla Mallory. In the ladies doubles she was also a two time quarter finalist in 1914 and 1920.

Her other career singles highlights include winning the Les Avants Championship four times (1906, 1910–1912), the Swiss International Championships on clay courts four times (1909–1912), the Championships of Pays-d'Enhaut at Château-d'Œx four times (1905–1906, 1909–1910), the Savoy Championships at Évian-les-Bains, France three times (1908–1910), the Geneva Championships three times (1908–1910), the North London Hard Courts Championships three times (1923–1924, 1927), French Switzerland Championships three times (1909-1910, 1922), Hurlingham Grass Courts two times (1920, 1923), the Reigate Open two times (1921-1922).

She won one time titles at the Exmouth Open (1907), Drive Club Open Tournament on hard cement courts (1910), the South Saxons Open Tournament at Hastings (1913), London Championships at Queen's Club (1913), Dulwich Farm Hard Courts (1914), the Angmering-on-Sea Open (1920), Epsom Grass Courts (1921) Cranleigh Open (1924), the Boulogne International Championship (1922), Felixstowe Clay Courts (1925), North of England Hard Court Championships (1927), Hertfordshire Championships (1928)

She was also a finalist at the Henley Hard Court Tennis Tournament three times (1920, 1922–1923), the British Covered Court Championships two times, (1912, 1923), the East Grinstead Open two times (1920, 1927), the Drive Club Open Tournament two times on clay courts (1922, 1924), the Le Touquet International two times (1925–1926), Engadine Championships (1910) Middlesex Championships (1914), Northern Championships (1920), Dinard International (1921), Dorset Championships (1921), Epsom Grass Courts (1922), Surrey Championships (1924), the Herga LTC Championship (1927), the North of England Hard Court Championships (1928), Hertfordshire Championships (1929)

== Personal life ==
She was born Aurea Farrington on 21 February 1878. Aurea was the daughter of Sir William Hicks Farrington, 5th Bt of the Farrington baronets and Amy Florence Glendining. She married Major Herbert Edgington on 10 December 1907, after which she became known as Aurea Edgington. She died on 27 April 1967 at the age 89.
