= Humphrey Sumner Milford =

English publisher and editor (1877–1952)

Sir Humphrey Sumner Milford (8 February 1877 – 6 September 1952) was an English publisher and editor who from 1913 to 1945 was publisher to the University of Oxford and head of the London operations of Oxford University Press (OUP).

== Overview ==
In his work, he made OUP a major worldwide publisher of noteworthy books, music, and educational material for the general public, complementing the scholarly work of the Clarendon Press in Oxford. Milford himself edited volumes of works of Robert Browning, William Cowper, and Leigh Hunt; and was principal editor of The Oxford Book of Regency Verse (later The Oxford Book of Romantic Verse) and a moving force behind the Oxford Dictionary of Quotations. Upon publication of the final volume of the Oxford English Dictionary in 1928, he was among those awarded an honorary D.Litt. by the university. He was knighted in 1936.

His elder son by his first marriage was the composer Robin Milford (1903–1959); his younger son was the racket and hockey player David Milford (1905–1984). His sister Violet Alice Milford was the mother of the poet and scholar Anne Ridler (1912–2001). In summing up his work, The Times of London cited his "unfailing catholicity", "nose for a good book", and "rare sense of the practicable".

== Sources ==
- Chatterjee, Rimi B. Empires of the Mind: A History of the Oxford University Press in India under the Raj. New Delhi: OUP (ISBN 978-0-19-567474-3), 2006.
- Maw, Martin. "Milford, Sir Humphrey Sumner". Oxford Dictionary of National Biography. Volume 38. Oxford: OUP (ISBN 0-19-861388-1), 2004.
- Norrington, A. L. P. “Milford, Sir Humphrey Sumner”. Dictionary of National Biography. Seventh Supplement. London: OUP, 1971.
- "Sir Humphrey Milford" [Obituary]. The Times [London]. No. 52,411 (September 8, 1952), p. 6.
- Sutcliffe, Peter. The Oxford University Press: An Informal History. Oxford: Clarendon Press (ISBN 978-0-19-951084-9), 1978.
