= Agnes Tuckey =

English tennis player

- Full name: Agnes Katherine Raymond Tuckey
- Country (sports): United Kingdom
- Born: 8 July 1877 Marylebone, Middlesex, England
- Died: 13 May 1972 (aged 94) Winchester, Hampshire, England

Singles

Grand Slam singles results
- Wimbledon: QF (1908, 1914)

Doubles

Grand Slam doubles results
- Wimbledon: QF (1913, 1920, 1921, 1922)

Grand Slam mixed doubles results
- Wimbledon: W (1913)

Agnes Katherine Raymond Tuckey (née Daniell; 8 July 1877 – 13 May 1972) was an English tennis player. With Hope Crisp, she was the winner of the first Wimbledon mixed doubles in 1913.

In 1906 she married Charles Orpen Tuckey who taught mathematics at Charterhouse School. They played mixed doubles together. Among their children were Raymond and Kay who played in the Wightman Cup between 1949 and 1951. Agnes, when in her fifties, partnered Raymond in the mixed doubles in 1931 and 1932, the only instance of a parent and child teaming up at the championships.

In the 1913 Wimbledon Championships, she won with Crisp the first mixed doubles final at Wimbledon in an unusual fashion - Ethel Thomson Larcombe was struck by a ball in the eye and unable to continue the match. The incident occurred when the second set was 5–3 for Crisp and Tuckey, the first having been won by the opposing pair of James Cecil Parke and Mrs Larcombe. In the 1914 Wimbledon Championships Crisp and Tuckey were the losing semi-finalists.

== Grand Slam finals ==
=== Mixed doubles (1 title) ===
Result	Year	Championship	Surface	Partner	Opponents	Score
Winner	1913	Wimbledon	Grass	(United Kingdom) Hope Crisp	(United Kingdom) James Parke (United Kingdom) Ethel Thomson Larcombe	3–6, 5–3 ret.
