= Edith Hannam =

British tennis player

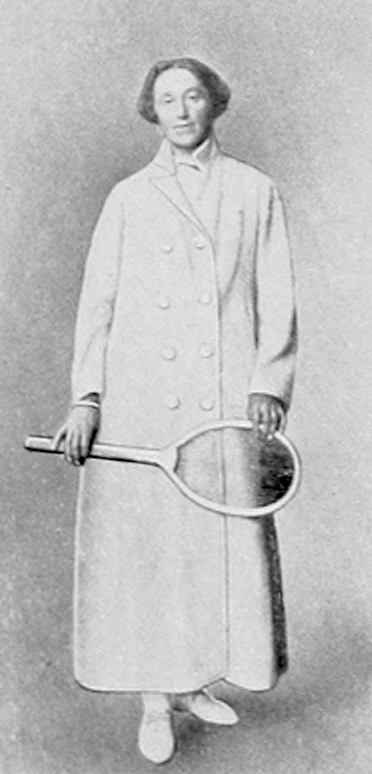
- Hannam in 1912
- Full name: Edith Margaret Hannam
- Country (sports): United Kingdom
- Born: 28 November 1878 Bristol, England
- Died: 16 January 1951 (aged 72) Kensington, England

Singles

Grand Slam singles results
- Wimbledon: F (1911, All Comers')

Doubles

Grand Slam doubles results
- Wimbledon: F (1914)
Medal record
tennis
Gold medal – first place	1912 Stockholm	Indoor singles
Gold medal – first place	1912 Stockholm	Indoor mixed doubles

Edith Margaret Hannam (née Boucher; 28 November 1878 – 16 January 1951) was a tennis player from Great Britain. She played at the 1912 Summer Olympics and won two gold medals.

== Family life ==
Edith Margaret Boucher was born in Bristol, Gloucestershire, on 28 November 1878, the daughter of John and Julia Boucher; her father was a pharmaceutical chemist. Her older brother was John Mycroft Boucher, a tennis player and businessman.

Boucher married Francis John Hannam at Long Ashton in 1909, as a captain in the Gloucestershire Regiment he was killed in action in France on 5 July 1916.

== Tennis career ==
In 1909 at the Cincinnati Open, Hannam won the singles and mixed doubles titles and was a doubles finalist. She beat Martha Kinsey in the final for the singles title, paired with Julius Frieberg to reach the doubles final, and teamed with Paul Lincoln Mitchell to win the mixed doubles title.

At the 1912 Olympics, Hannam won the gold medal in both the Woman's Singles indoor tournament, beating Danish player Sofie Castenschiold in straight sets, and in the Mixed Doubles indoor tournament with partner Charles Dixon. In 1914, she reached the Woman's Doubles finals at Wimbledon with partner Ethel Thomson Larcombe but lost in straight sets to Elizabeth Ryan and Agnes Morton.

== Grand Slam finals ==
=== Doubles (1 runner-up) ===
Result	Year	Championship	Surface	Partner	Opponents	Score
Loss	1914	Wimbledon	Grass	(United Kingdom) Ethel Thomson Larcombe	(United Kingdom) Agnes Morton (United States) Elizabeth Ryan	1–6, 3–6
