= Agnes Morton =

English tennis player (1872–1952)

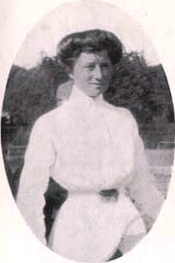
- Morton, prior to 1910
- Full name: Agnes Mary Morton
- Born: 6 March 1872 Halstead, Essex, England
- Died: 5 April 1952 (aged 80) Kensington, London, England
- Turned pro: 1889 (amateur)
- Retired: 1914

Singles
- Career titles: 46

Grand Slam singles results
- Wimbledon: F^{(AC)} (1908, 1909)

Doubles

Grand Slam doubles results
- Wimbledon: W (1914)

Agnes Morton (6 March 1872 – 5 April 1952) was a British female tennis player. She twice reached the Ladies Singles finals at the 1908 and 1909 Wimbledon Championships and claimed victory in 1914 in Ladies Doubles with partner Elizabeth Ryan, the same year she reached the singles final at the Northern Championships. She placed fourth at the 1908 Summer Olympics in Ladies Lawn Tennis.

== Career ==
Morton played her first event at the Essex Championships in 1889. She won her first tournament at the Colchester Championship in 1891.

Between 1891 and 1914 she contested 70 career singles finals, winning 46 titles.

Her main career singles highlights included winning the London Championships two times, the Tunbridge Wells Open three times, the East of England Championships two times, the Essex Championships six times, the Suffolk Championships nine times, and the Redhill Open nine times.

On the international circuit she won the International Tennis Championship of Deauville one time, the Baden Baden International two times, and The Homburg Cup three times.

In 1903, she was described by A. Wallis Myers as a 'careful, steady and improving player'.

== Grand Slam finals ==
=== Singles (2 runners-up) ===
Result	Year	Championship	Surface	Opponent	Score
Loss	1908^{1}	Wimbledon	Grass	(United Kingdom) Charlotte Cooper Sterry	4–6, 4–6
Loss	1909^{2}	Wimbledon	Grass	(United Kingdom) Dora Boothby	4–6, 6–4, 6–8

^{1}This was the all-comers final as May Sutton Bundy did not defend her 1907 Wimbledon title, which resulted in the winner of the all-comers final winning the challenge round and, thus, Wimbledon in 1908 by walkover.
^{2}This was the all-comers final as Charlotte Cooper Sterry did not defend her 1908 Wimbledon title, which resulted in the winner of the all-comers final winning the challenge round and, thus, Wimbledon in 1909 by walkover.

=== Doubles (1 title) ===
Result	Year	Championship	Surface	Partner	Opponents	Score
Win	1914	Wimbledon	Grass	(United States) Elizabeth Ryan	(United Kingdom) Edith Hannam (United Kingdom) Ethel Larcombe	6–1, 6–3
