= Theodore Mavrogordato =

British tennis player (1883–1941)

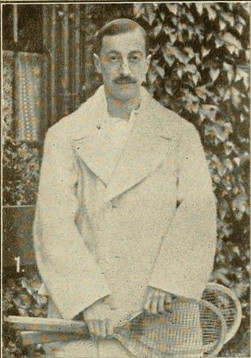
- Mavrogordato in 1914
- Full name: Theodore Michel Mavrogordato
- Country (sports): United Kingdom
- Born: 31 July 1883 London, England
- Died: 24 August 1941 (aged 58) Limpsfield, Surrey, England
- Turned pro: 1903 (amateur tour)
- Retired: 1928
- Plays: Right-handed (one-handed backhand)

Singles
- Career record: 283-105 (72.6%)
- Career titles: 30
- Highest ranking: No. 8 (1921)

Grand Slam singles results
- Wimbledon: SF (1909, 1914, 1920)

Other tournaments
- WCCC: 3R (1920)
- Olympic Games: 2R (1912^{In})

Doubles

Grand Slam doubles results
- Wimbledon: F (1914) (Note: All-Comers tournament)

Other doubles tournaments
- WCCC: W (1920)

Theodore Michel Mavrogordato (31 July 1883 – 24 August 1941) was a tennis player from Great Britain who was active during the first decades of the 20th century.

== Career ==
Mavrogordato represented Oxford University in the 1904 and 1905 Oxford v. Cambridge matches.

He played his first Wimbledon singles' competition in 1904 and lost in the first round to Frederick Payn. In 1907, he reached the final of the All England Plate but was beaten by George Hillyard in two straight sets. (Note: The All England Plate was a tennis competition held at the Wimbledon Championships which consisted of players who were defeated in the first or second rounds of the singles competition.) His best achievement in the Wimbledon singles event was reaching the semi-final of the All-Comers tournament on three occasions. The first time was in 1909 when he lost in four sets to Major Ritchie. His second semi-final appearance came in 1914 and this time he lost in straight sets to German Otto Froitzheim. His last semi-final came in 1920, eleven years after the first, after defeating two–time U.S. Championship winner R. Norris Williams in the quarterfinal. This time Japanese Zenzo Shimizu proved too strong. Over the following years he would make regular appearances at Wimbledon until his final participation in 1928.

He participated in the 1912 Olympic Games in Stockholm and played in the indoor tournament. In the mixed doubles event he reached the second round with his partner, and future wife, Mabel Parton. In the singles and men's doubles event he lost in the first round.

Mavrogodato played for the British Davis Cup team in 1914 and won all his singles matches in the quarter- and semi-final. In the final against Australasia he only played the doubles match together with his partner James Cecil Parke which they lost to Norman Brookes and Anthony Wilding. In 1919, after World War I, he played in the semi-final against South Africa and won his single match against Louis Raymond. He lost his second match, a dead rubber, against George Dodd.

Between 1905 and 1913, he won five titles at the Welsh Covered Court Championships. In 1909, Mavrogordato won the Scottish Championships.

In 1912, he reached the final of the Northern Championships in Liverpool which he lost to J.C. Parke, but he won the Northern Championships in 1914 and again in 1924 at age 42.

In October 1912, he won the singles title of the London Covered Court Championships defeating Ritchie in the final.

In 1914, he won the doubles title at the British Covered Court Championships. Together with P.M. Davson they beat P. Hicks and W. Ingram in the final. Seven years later, in 1921, he again won the doubles title, this time partnering with P. M. Davson.

In October 1919, he won the singles title of the London Covered Court Championships defeating Nicolae Mișu of Rumania in the final.

Mavrogordato was ranked world No. 9 for 1914 by Lawn Tennis and Badminton magazine, and world No. 8 for 1921 by Bill Tilden.

During World War I Mavrogordato served in the Army Service Corps and was ranked a captain and later a major. From 1928 until his death on 24 August 1941, aged 58, he was chairman of the All England Lawn Tennis Ground Company.

=== Playing style ===
In his book The Art of Lawn Tennis, Bill Tilden describes Mavrogordato's playing style: "His game is steadiness personified. He shoves his service in the court at the end of a prodigious swing that ends in a poke. It goes where he wishes it. His ground strokes are fine, in splendid form, very accurate and remarkably fast for so little effort. Mavro is not large enough to hit hard, but owing to his remarkable footwork, he covers a very large territory in a remarkably short space of time. His racquet work is a delight to a student of orthodox form. His volleying is accurate, steady, well placed but defensive. He has no speed or punch to his volley. His overhead is steady to the point of being unique. He is so small that it seems as if anyone could lob over his head, but his speed of foot is so great that he invariably gets his racquet on it and puts it back deep. Mavro turns defence into attack by putting the ball back in play so often that his opponent gets tired hitting it and takes unnecessary chances. His accuracy is so great that it makes up for his lack of speed. His judgment is sound but not brilliant. He is a hard-working, conscientious player who deserves his success."

== World Championships finals ==
=== Doubles: (1 title) ===
Result	Year	Championship	Surface	Partner	Opponents	Score
Win	1920	World Covered Court Championships	Wood	(United Kingdom) Percival Davson	(United Kingdom) Alfred Beamish (New Zealand) Frank Fisher	4–6, 10–8, 13–11, 3–6, 6–3
