= Mabel Parton =

British tennis player

- Born: Mabel Bramwell Squire; 22 July 1881; Hampstead, London, England
- Died: 12 August 1962 (aged 81); Surrey, England.
- Occupation: Tennis player
- Known for: Olympic bronze medalist
- Spouse(s): Ernest George Parton; Theodore Mavrogordato

Olympic medal record

Women's tennis
| Bronze medal – third place | 1912 Stockholm | Singles |

Mabel Bramwell Parton (22 July 1881 – 12 August 1962) was a British tennis player who won a bronze medal at the 1912 Summer Olympics in Stockholm.

Parton had won a place in the semi-final but lost to Edith Hannam. She then won the bronze medal final 6–3, 6–3 against Sigrid Fick of Sweden.

== Family life ==
Parton was born on 22 July 1881 at Hampstead in London as Mabel Bramwell Squire, the daughter of Peter and Mabel Squire. Parton married firstly solicitor Ernest George Parton in 1906 and then tennis player Theodore Mavrogordato in 1924.
