= Helen Aitchison =

British tennis player

Frances Aitchison
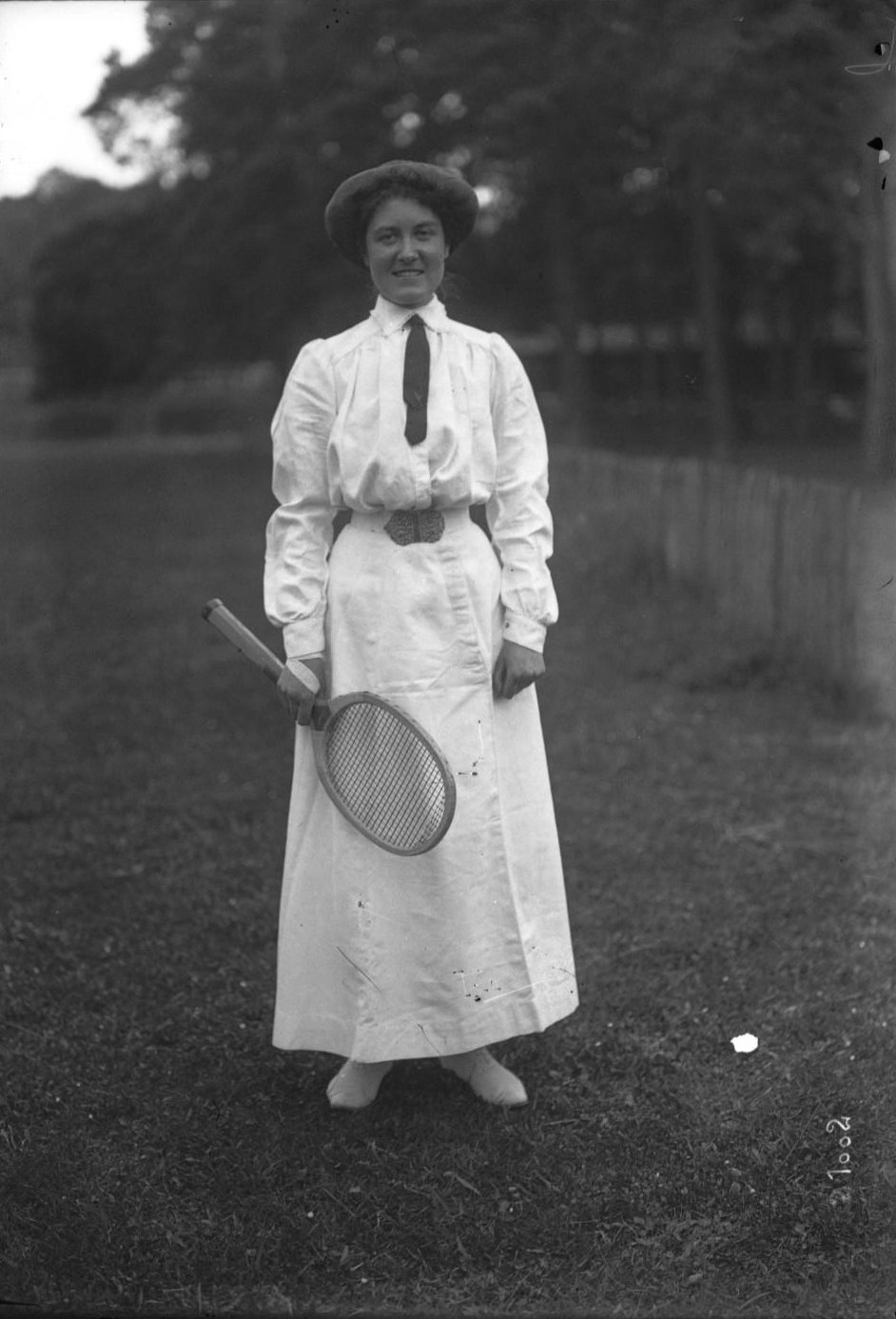
- Full name: Frances Helen Aitchison
- Country (sports): United Kingdom
- Born: 6 December 1881; Sunderland
- Died: 26 May 1947 (aged 65); Aylesbury

Singles

Grand Slam singles results
- Wimbledon: SF (1911, 1913, 1914)

Other tournaments
- WCCC: W (1913)
- Olympic Games: QF (1912)

Doubles

Grand Slam doubles results
- Wimbledon: W

Other mixed doubles tournaments
- Olympic Games: Silver Medal (1912)

Olympic medal record

Tennis
Silver medal – second place	1912 Stockholm	Indoor mixed doubles

Frances Helen Aitchison (6 December 1881 – 26 May 1947) was a Sunderland-born tennis player who competed in the 1912 Summer Olympics.

In 1912, she won the silver medal with her partner Herbert Barrett in the indoor mixed doubles competition. She also participated in the indoor singles event but was eliminated in the quarter-finals.

== Background ==
Aitchison was born in Sunderland in 1881, the eldest daughter of shipbuilder James Aitchison and his wife Mary of Grange Terrace, later The Cedars. She competed in the County Championships of 1907 with three of her sisters, Alice, Kathleen, and Sibyl, helping Durham to defeat Middlesex 5–4.

Aitchison entered the Wimbledon Championships for the first time in 1909, at the age of 27, winning the unofficial Ladies Doubles title with partner Agnes Tuckey. She also competed in 1910, 1911, 1913, and 1914, reaching three semi-finals and two quarter-finals in the Ladies Singles. In 1913, she won the singles title at World Covered Court Championship in Stockholm, defeating Kate Gillou in the final in straight sets. Her success at the Stockholm Olympics in 1912 made her the first person from Sunderland to become an Olympic medalist.

At Epsom in 1914, she married John Leisk.
