= Winifred McNair =

British tennis player

- Country (sports): United Kingdom
- Born: 9 August 1877 Donnington, Berkshire, England
- Died: 28 March 1954 (aged 76) Kensington, London, England

Singles

Grand Slam singles results
- Wimbledon: F (1913)

Doubles

Grand Slam doubles results
- Wimbledon: W (1913)

Grand Slam mixed doubles results
- Wimbledon: SF (1921, 1922)
Medal record
Olympic Games – Tennis
| Gold medal – first place | 1920 Antwerp | Doubles |

Winifred McNair (née Winifred Margaret Slocock, 9 August 1877 – 28 March 1954) was a tennis player from Great Britain. She is best remembered for her women's doubles (partnering Kathleen McKane) gold medal at the 1920 Olympics in Antwerp, Belgium. Between 1906 and 1925 she competed in 15 editions of the Wimbledon Championships. Her best Wimbledon result came in 1913 when in the singles she reached the final of the all-comers' event and won the doubles title, partnering Dora Boothby.

She married Roderick McNair on 22 April 1908.

== Grand Slam finals ==
=== Singles (1 runner-up) ===
| Result | Year | Championship | Surface | Opponent | Score |
|---|---|---|---|---|---|
| Loss | 1913^{1} | Wimbledon | Grass | (United Kingdom) Dorothea Lambert Chambers | 0–6, 4–6 |

^{1}This was actually the all-comers final as Ethel Thomson Larcombe did not defend her 1912 Wimbledon title, which resulted in the winner of the all-comers final winning the challenge round and, thus, Wimbledon in 1913 by walkover.

=== Doubles (1 title) ===
| Result | Year | Championship | Surface | Partner | Opponents | Score |
|---|---|---|---|---|---|---|
| Win | 1913 | Wimbledon | Grass | (United Kingdom) Dora Boothby | (United Kingdom) Charlotte Cooper Sterry (United Kingdom) Dorothea Lambert Chambers | 4–6, 2–4 ret. |
