= Ethel Thomson Larcombe =

British badminton and tennis player

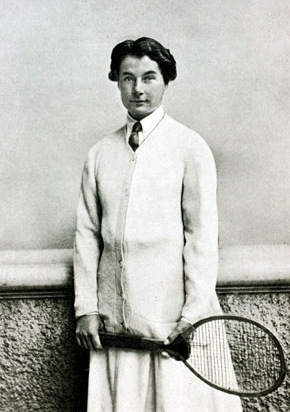
- Full name: Ethel Warneford Thomson Larcombe
- Country (sports): United Kingdom
- Born: 8 June 1879 Islington, England
- Died: 11 August 1965 (aged 86) Budleigh Salterton, England
- Plays: Right-handed

Singles

Grand Slam singles results
- Wimbledon: W (1912)

Doubles

Grand Slam doubles results
- Wimbledon: F (1914, 1919, 1920)

Grand Slam mixed doubles results
- Wimbledon: W (1914)

Ethel Larcombe (née Ethel Warneford Thomson, 8 June 1879 – 11 August 1965) was a British female tennis player and badminton player. She won the ladies' singles tennis title at the 1912 Wimbledon Championships as well as 11 badminton titles at the All England Badminton Championships.

== Career ==
Ethel was born 8 June 1879 as the second child of Herbert Warneford Thomson, surgeon, and his wife, Sophia Charlotte Bond. Her older brother Hugh was born in 1878.

She first competed at Wimbledon in 1902 when she lost in the first round to Agnes Morton. The following year, 1903, she reached the final of the All-Comers tournament in which she was defeated by Dorothea Douglass in three sets. Larcombe did not play competitive tennis for four years from 1907 until her return in 1911. In 1912 she became Wimbledon champion by first defeating Charlotte Cooper Sterry in the All-Comers' final and subsequently receiving a walkover in the Challenge Round. The following year she was unable to defend her singles title when she was injured in the final of the mixed doubles. Her partner James Cecil Parke misjudged a smash in the second set which hit her full on the side of the face and the resulting eye injury forced her to retire from the mixed doubles final and to default from her challenge round match against Dorothea Lambert Chambers scheduled for the following day. In total she participated in 11 editions of the Wimbledon Championships between 1902 and 1921.

She won the Scottish Championships singles title three times (1910–12) and she won the singles title at the Irish Championships in 1912 defeating Mrs. Norton-Barry in the final in two sets.

=== Playing style ===
In contrast to most of her contemporaries Larcombe played her service underhand. In 1903 A. Wallis Myers wrote that her favorite shot was the backhand down the line and that she possessed an effective smash. According to Dorothea Lambert-Chambers she was one of the best female volleyers of her time but did not have very good fitness, causing her to fade in matches. After her return to tennis in 1911, several aspects of her game had improved including her forehand shot as well as her stamina.

== Grand Slam finals ==
=== Singles (1 title, 2 runners-up) ===
Result	Year	Championship	Surface	Opponent	Score
Loss	1903^{2}	Wimbledon	Grass	(United Kingdom of Great Britain and Ireland) Dorothea Douglass	6–4, 4–6, 2–6
Win	1912^{1}	Wimbledon	Grass	(United Kingdom of Great Britain and Ireland) Charlotte Cooper Sterry	6–3, 6–1
Loss	1914	Wimbledon	Grass	(United Kingdom of Great Britain and Ireland) Dorothea Lambert Chambers	5–7, 4–6

=== Doubles (3 runner-ups) ===
Result	Year	Championship	Surface	Partner	Opponents	Score
Loss	1914	Wimbledon	Grass	(United Kingdom) Edith Hannam	(United Kingdom) Agnes Morton (United States) Elizabeth Ryan	1–6, 3–6
Loss	1919	Wimbledon	Grass	(United Kingdom) Dorothea Lambert-Chambers	(France) Suzanne Lenglen (United States) Elizabeth Ryan	6–4, 5–7, 3–6
Loss	1920	Wimbledon	Grass	(United Kingdom) Dorothea Lambert-Chambers	(France) Suzanne Lenglen (United States) Elizabeth Ryan	4–6, 0–6

=== Mixed doubles (1 title, 1 runner-up) ===
Result	Year	Championship	Surface	Partner	Opponents	Score
Loss	1913	Wimbledon	Grass	(Republic of Ireland) James Cecil Parke	(United Kingdom) Agnes Tuckey (United Kingdom) Hope Crisp	6–3, 3–5 ret.
Win	1914	Wimbledon	Grass	(Republic of Ireland) James Cecil Parke	(France) Marguerite Broquedis (New Zealand) Anthony Wilding	4–6, 6–4, 6–2

^{1} This was the all-comers final as Dorothea Douglass Lambert Chambers did not defend her 1911 Wimbledon title, which resulted in the winner of the all-comers final winning the challenge round and, thus, Wimbledon in 1912 by walkover.
^{2} This was the all-comers final as Muriel Robb did not defend her 1902 Wimbledon title, which resulted in the winner of the all-comers final winning the challenge round and, thus, Wimbledon in 1903 by walkover.

== Badminton ==
As a badminton player she won 11 titles at the All England Badminton Championships, five of them in women's singles (1900, 1901, 1903, 1904 and 1906), four in women's doubles and two in mixed doubles.

== Personal life ==
On 15 October 1906 she married Major Dudley Larcombe, who was secretary of the All England Club from 1925 to 1939.
