= The Homburg Cup =

The Homburg Cup Der Homburg-Pokal

Defunct tennis tournament
- Tour: Pre-open era (1877-1967)
- Founded: 1894
- Abolished: 1936
- Editions: 26
- Location: Bad Homburg vor der Höhe, Germany
- Venue: Bad Homburg Tennis Club (1894-1936)
- Surface: Clay/Outdoor

The Homburg Cup or Der Homburg-Pokal its original name was a tennis event held from 1894 through 1936 in Bad Homburg vor der Höhe, Germany on outdoor Clay court's.

== History ==
The Homburg Cup tournament was first held in 1894 played at the Bad Homburg Tennis Club, Bad Homburg vor der Höhe, Germany and usually August. The Homburg Cup was organised by the 1st President of the German Tennis Federation, Carl August von der Meden, the early staging of this event attracted some of the most well known aristocracy in Europe such as the, Emperor of Germany, Crown Prince of Greece, and the Duke of Cambridge numerous other aristocrats appeared every year which generated significant press coverage for the event, prize money that was on offer was said to be substantial at the time which was probably why it was considered one of the most important and prestigious early pre-open era tournaments in continental Europe and Germany along with German Championships known then for its ability to attract the best players in the world throughout its early period certainly up to the beginning of World War I. It was an open event and featured the likes of the Arthur Gore, Anthony Wilding, Joshua Pim Laurence and Reginald Doherty, A Harold Mahony and Max Décugis its lasted 41 years until 1935 the event featured men's doubles, women's singles and doubles and mixed doubles competition.

== Finals ==
Notes: Challenge round: The final round of a tournament, in which the winner of a single-elimination phase faces the previous year's champion, who plays only that one match. The challenge round was used in the early history of tennis (from 1877 through 1921) in some tournaments not all. * Indicates challenger

=== Men's singles ===
(Incomplete list)

Year	Champions	Runners-up	Score
1894	(Australia) Samuel Henry Hughes	?	?
1895	(United Kingdom) William M. Cranston	(United Kingdom) Reginald Forbes	6-0, 6-3, 6-1
1896	(England) Reginald Doherty	(United Kingdom) William M. Cranston	walkover
1897	(England) Reginald Doherty (2)	(England) George Hillyard	walkover
1898	(England) Reginald Doherty (3)	(England) Laurence Doherty	walkover
1899	(England) Reginald Doherty (4)	(United States) Clarence Hobart	3-6, 4-6, 6-0, 6-3, 6-4
1900	(England) Laurence Doherty	(England) George Hillyard	7-5, 6-2, 3-6, 4-6, 6-2
1901	(France) Max Decugis	(France) Jacques Worth	walkover
1902	(United Kingdom) Josiah Ritchie	(United Kingdom) Frederick William Payn	6-3, 6-1, 6-4
1903	(Ireland) George Ball-Greene	(United Kingdom) Josiah Ritchie	7-5, 7-5, 3-6, 2-6, 6-3
1904	(Ireland) George Ball-Greene (2)	(United States) Wylie Cameron Grant	9-7, 6-2, 6-3
1905	(Ireland) George Ball-Greene (3)	(New Zealand) Anthony Wilding	shared title
1906	(New Zealand) Anthony Wilding (2)	(Germany) Otto Froitzheim	6-1, 6-1, 6-4
1907	(Germany) Otto Froitzheim	(New Zealand) Anthony Wilding	6-4, 6-2, 6-3
1908	(Germany) Otto Froitzheim (2)	(New Zealand) Anthony Wilding	6-4, 4-6, 6-4, 8-6
1909	(Germany) Otto Froitzheim (3)	(United Kingdom) Josiah Ritchie	6-4, 5-7, 6-1, 4-6, 7-5
1910	(Germany) Heinrich Kleinschroth	(Germany) Heinrich Schomburgk	5-7, 6-4, 6-0, 6-3
1911	(Germany) Otto Froitzheim (4)	(Germany) Heinrich Schomburgk	1-6, 6-4, 6-3, 6-3
1912	(Germany) Oscar Kreuzer	(United Kingdom) Gordon Lowe	6-4, 1-6, 3-6, 6-0, 8-6
1913	(Germany) Otto Froitzheim (5)	(Germany) Paul Otto Lindpaintner	6-1, 6-2
1914/1918	Not held (due to World War I)		
1919	(Germany) Otto Froitzheim (6)	(Germany) Oscar Kreuzer	6-3, 6-1, 6-1
1920	(Germany) Otto Froitzheim (7)	(Germany) Oscar Kreuzer	6-1, 6-3, 6-3
1921	(Germany) Oscar Kreuzer (2)	(Germany) Heinrich Kleinschroth	6-3, 3-6, 6-4, 6-2
1925	(Germany) Willi Hannemann	(Germany) Otto Froitzheim	4-6, 7-5, ret.
1926	(Denmark) Axel Petersen	(Germany) Otto Froitzheim	w.o.
1927	(Germany) Georg T. W. Demasius	(Germany) Otto Froitzheim	w.o.
1928	(Denmark) Axel Petersen (2)	(Germany) Johann Philip Buss	2-6, 6-1, 6-3, ret.
1929	(France) Christian Boussus	(Germany) Otto Froitzheim	w.o.
1930	(Australia) Harry Hopman	(France) Christian Boussus	2-6, 6-4, 6-3, 0-6, 6-4
1931	(Czechoslovakia) Roderich Menzel	(Germany) Fritz Kuhlmann Sr	6-1, 6-1, 4-6, 6-0
1932	(Australia) Harry Hopman (2)	(Australia) Clifford Sproule	2-6, 4-6, 6-3, 8-6, 6-3
1933/1934	Not held		
1935	(Germany) Werner Menzel	(Germany) Fritz Kuhlmann Sr	6-1, 6-1, 4-6, 6-0
1936	(United Kingdom) John Olliff	(Romania) Arnulf Schmidt	1-6, 8-6, 3-6, 6-4, 6-2

=== Women's singles ===
(Incomplete list)

Year	Champions	Runners-up	Score
1895	(United Kingdom) Toupie Lowther	(Germany) Sabine Pollen	6-2. 6-1
1896	(United Kingdom) Elsie Lane	(United Kingdom) Toupie Lowther	6-0, 6-2
1897	(United Kingdom) Blanche Bingley Hillyard	(United Kingdom) Charlotte Cooper	divided prizes.
1898	(United Kingdom) Elsie Lane (2)	(United Kingdom) Toupie Lowther	7-5, 7-5
1899	(United Kingdom) Charlotte Cooper	(Germany) Clara von der Schulenburg	7-5. 6-4
1900	(United Kingdom) Blanche Bingley Hillyard (2)	(United Kingdom) Muriel Robb	2-6, 8-6, 7-5
1901	(United Kingdom) Toupie Lowther (2)	(United Kingdom) Blanche Duddell	6-0, 6-0
1902	(United Kingdom) Charlotte Cooper Sterry (2)	(United Kingdom) Toupie Lowther	6-2, 2-6, 6-3
1903	(United Kingdom) Toupie Lowther (3)	(Germany) Clara von der Schulenburg	1-6, 6-4, 6-0
1904	(United Kingdom) Toupie Lowther (4)	(United Kingdom) Elsie Lane	6-2, 7-5
1905	(United Kingdom) Dorothea Douglass	(United Kingdom) Toupie Lowther	6-3, 7-5
1906	(United Kingdom) Dorothea Douglass (2)	(United Kingdom) Blanche Bingley Hillyard	6-4, 8-6
1907	(Germany) Hedwig Neresheimer	(United Kingdom) Rosamund Salusbury	10-8, 6-3
1908	(Germany) Lucie Bergmann	(Germany) Miss. Stettheimer	6-2, 6-2
1909	(United Kingdom) Agnes Morton	(Germany) Dagmar von Krohn	6-2, 6-2
1910	(United Kingdom) Agnes Morton (2)	(Germany) Mieken Rieck	6-1, 6-4
1911	(United Kingdom) Agnes Morton (3)	(Germany) Nelly Bamberger	6-2, 6-4
1912	(Germany) Lilly Salin	(Germany) Ilse Weihermann	6-3, 6-4
1913	(Germany) Nelly Bamberger	(Germany) Lilly Salin	6-3, 2-0 retd.
1914/1918	Not held (due to World War I)		
1919	(Germany) Ilse Friedleben	(Spain) Lili de Alvarez	?
1921	(Germany) Ilse Friedleben (2)	(Spain) Lili de Alvarez	5-7, 8-6 retd.
1922	(Germany) Ilse Friedleben (3)	(Germany) Hete Käber	6-3, 6-2
1924	(Germany) Ilse Friedleben (4)	(Germany) Toni Weihermann	?
1925	(Germany) Ilse Friedleben (5)	(Germany) Cilly Aussem	6-2, 6-3
1926	(Germany) Anna Weihermann Hemp	(Germany) Nelly Neppach	6-4, 3-6, 3-0 retd.
1927	(Germany) Ilse Friedleben	(France) Simonne Mathieu	6-4, 3-0, retd.
1928	(Germany) Toni Mettenheimer Schomburgk	(Germany) Ilse Friedleben	6-4, 2-6, 6-4
1929	(Germany) Toni Weihermann Richter	(Germany) Ellen Hoffmann	6-1, 6-2
1930	(Germany) Ilse Friedleben (6)	(Germany) Hilde Krahwinkel	default
1931	(Germany) Anne Peitz	(Germany) Marie-Louise Horn	6-3, 7-5
1932	(Germany) Hilde Krahwinkel	(Germany) Marie-Louise Horn	6-1, 6-0
1933/1934	Not held		
1935	(Germany) Margarethe Käppel	(Germany) Anne Peitz Schneider	6-4, 3-6, 7-5
1936	(Germany) Anneliese Ullstein	(Germany) Klara Hammer Beutter	6-4, 7-5

== Records ==
- Most Men's Singles Titles: (Germany) Otto Froitzheim (7)
- Most Men's Finals: (Germany) Otto Froitzheim (11)
- Most Women's Singles Titles: (Germany) Ilse Friedleben (6)
- Most Women's Singles Finals: (Germany) Ilse Friedleben & (United Kingdom) Toupie Lowther (7)

== See also ==
- History of tennis
