= Toupie Lowther =

English tennis player and fencer

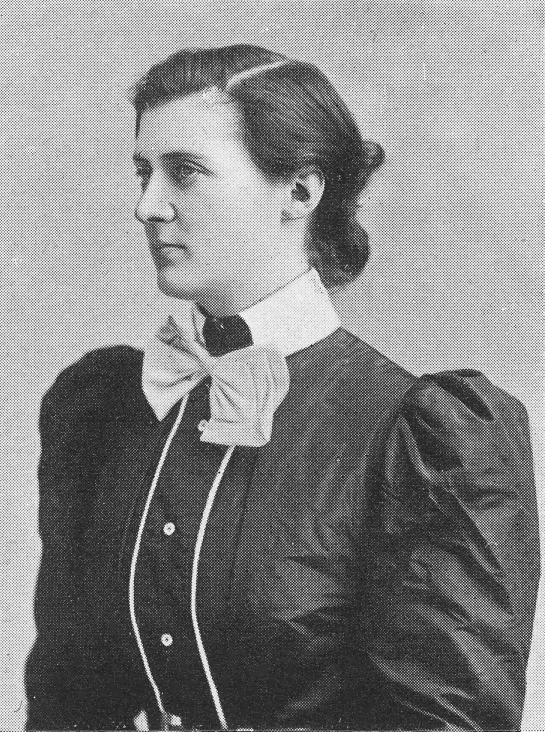
- Full name: May Lowther
- Country (sports): United Kingdom
- Born: 15 April 1874 London, England
- Died: 30 December 1944 (age 69) Pulborough, England
- Turned pro: 1891 (amateur tour)
- Retired: 1907

Singles
- Career titles: 12

Grand Slam singles results
- Wimbledon: SF (1903, 1906)

May "Toupie" Lowther (also Toupée; 15 April 1874 – 30 December 1944) was an English tennis player and fencer, active during the late 19th century and early 20th century. During the First World War, she led an all-female English unit of ambulance drivers assisting the French Army and was awarded the Croix de Guerre.

== Early life and family ==
Lowther was born in London, the daughter of Francis William Lowther, born in Italy, and Louise Beatrice de Fonblanque, born in Montreal. She was the sister of Claude Lowther, MP for Lonsdale. Francis William was the illegitimate son of the William Lowther, 2nd Earl of Lonsdale and Emilia Cresotti, an Italian opera singer. Her maternal grandfather was the historian Edward Barrington de Fonblanque. Two years before Toupie's birth, the Earl of Lonsdale died and left her father a healthy inheritance of £125,000 (equivalent to £12,221,000 in 2025). She was educated in France at the boarding school Les Ruches in Avon, Seine-et-Marne and received a bachelor's of science from the Sorbonne.

== Tennis career ==
Lowther was a gifted athlete. The Times described her as "a brilliant fencer and sportswoman, who could hold her own in anything that required skill and brains." She was well known as an amateur player in championship women's tennis, and during the tennis season was a regular participant in the British tournaments at Edgbaston, Beckenham, Manchester and Wimbledon as well as on the traditional European circuit. In particular she played frequently at the German Ladies Championships (held at the prestigious Bad Homburg Tennis Club) from 1896–1901 and then in Hamburg (the Eisbahn-Verein auf der Uhlenhorst).

In 1898, at Bad Homburg she lost to compatriot Elsie Lane 5–7, 5–7 after a "brilliant, albeit erratic, Toupée (sic) Lowther who had abandoned her usual play in favour of an uninspired game from base line in two straight sets." In 1899 she lost a close match in an early round to Charlotte "Chatty" Cooper, (later Mrs Sterry). After leading 5–1 in the second set Toupie lost six games in a row. However Toupie was finally victorious at Bad Homburg in 1901 defeating Gladys Duddell in the final 6–0, 6–0, a victory described as the result of "patience and perseverance".

Lowther won the singles event at the British Covered Court Championships in 1900, 1902 and 1903. In 1901 she won the singles title at the German Championships, held that year in Bad Homburg, and received her prize, a gold brooch, from King Edward. Between 1900 and 1907 she made five appearances at the Wimbledon Championships, playing in the singles event. Her best result was reaching the semifinals in 1903, losing in straight sets to eventual champion Dorothea Douglass Lambert Chambers, as well as in 1906, this time losing in three sets to Charlotte Cooper Sterry.

She was described with affection by the tennis writers of the time. The brothers Reginald and Laurence Doherty invited her to write a chapter entitled Ladies' Play for their book Lawn Tennis published in 1903 and George Hillyard, the All England Tennis Club secretary for many years and husband to Blanche Hillyard in his book Forty Years of First Class Tennis (1924) was glowing in his appreciation: "Here is the extraordinary case of a player whose potentialities were greater than any other English lady who ever walked onto a court, but who, unfortunately was saddled with a temperament which was so hopelessly unsuitable to lawn tennis that it reduced her play.... not one, but at least 2 classes below what her form should have been... It is no flight of imagination to say that had Miss Lowther been blessed with the temperament of a Mrs Sterry or a Mrs Lambert Chambers, she might have been as fine a player as Mlle Lenglen herself." (Note: During the 1906 Wimbledon Championships the Lawn Tennis and Badminton journal described her as follows: "Miss Lowther has one of the best services possessed by and lady, while her style is good and very severe: but she just lacks enough steadiness".)

Lowther was also an outstanding fencer, a keen motorist, weightlifter and practitioner of jujitsu. In a fencing article in the July 1899 issue of Harmsworth Magazine she is described as "Perhaps the most clever among the younger generation of lady fencers...., who may justly be termed the champion swordswoman of the kingdom." An article in The Herald in 1901 mentions her as the lady fencing champion of England. A lesbian, she was known as 'Brother' by Romaine Brooks, and she crossed the alps on a motorbike with her god-daughter Fabienne Lafargue De-Avilla riding pillion.

== World War I ==
During World War I, frustrated with the lack of opportunities the British Army offered women during the war, she organised an all-female team of ambulance drivers, the Hackett-Lowther Ambulance Unit in France. The unit consisted of 20 cars and 25 to 30 women drivers and operated close to the front lines of battles in Compiègne, France and was attached to the 2nd Army Corps of the French Third Army. She was awarded the Croix de Guerre in July 1918. Additionally she was the London president of the Relief for Belgian prisoners in Germany committee. She returned to London in August 1919 after two-and-a-half years in France.

Lowther was a close friend of Radclyffe Hall, author of The Well of Loneliness and Hall drew on some of Lowther's experiences in depicting the life and character of its protagonist Stephen.

== Popular culture ==
Toupie Lowther is depicted as a member of a secret society of bodyguards protecting the leaders of the radical suffragettes in the graphic novel trilogy Suffrajitsu: Mrs. Pankhurst's Amazons (2015).

She was also portrayed in Murder in Montparnass, a Phryne Fisher novel by Kerry Greenwood (2002).

== Career finals ==
=== Singles (20) titles (12) runners up (8) ===
Category + (Titles)
Major (0)
National (3)
International (8)
Provincial/Regional/State (0)
County 0)
Regular (1)

Titles by Surface
Clay – Outdoor (8)
Grass – Outdoor (1)
Hard – Outdoor (0)
Carpet – Indoor (0)
Wood – Indoor (3)

No	Result	Year	Tournament	Surface	Opponent	Score
1.	Win	1891	Aldeburgh Lawn Tennis Tournament	Grass	(United Kingdom) Miss Carter	6–4, 0–6, 6–4
2.	Win	1895	The Homburg Cup	Clay	(Germany) S. Pollen	6–2, 6–1
1.	Loss	1896	The Homburg Cup	Clay	(United Kingdom) Elsie Lane	0–6, 2–6
2.	Loss	1898	The Homburg Cup	Clay	(United Kingdom) Elsie Lane	5–7, 5–7
3.	Win	1900	British Covered Court Championships	Wood (i)	(United Kingdom) Edith Austin	2–6, 7–5, 6–4
3.	Loss	1901	Middlesex Championships	Grass	(United Kingdom) Charlotte Cooper Sterry	3–6, 2–6
4.	Win	1901	The Homburg Cup (2)	Clay	(United Kingdom) Blanche Duddell	6–0, 6–0
5.	Win	1901	German Championships	Clay	(United Kingdom) Gladys Duddell	6–0, 6–0
6.	Win	1902	British Covered Court Championships (2)	Wood (i)	(United Kingdom) Gladys Duddell	6–3, 6–1
4.	Loss	1902	The Homburg Cup	Clay	(United Kingdom) Charlotte Cooper Sterry	2–6, 6–2, 3–6
7.	Win	1903	Monte Carlo Championships	Clay	(United Kingdom) Mildred Brooksmith	6–3, 6–1
8.	Win	1903	The Homburg Cup (3)	Clay	(Germany) Clara von der Schulenburg	1–6, 6–4, 6–0
9.	Win	1903	British Covered Court Championships (3)	Wood (i)	(France) Adine Masson	6–1, 6–0
10.	Win	1904	The Homburg Cup (4	Clay	(United Kingdom) Elsie Lane	6–2, 7–5
5.	Loss	1905	The Homburg Cup	Clay	(United Kingdom) Dorothea Douglass	3–6, 5–7
6.	Loss	1906	Baden Baden International	Clay	(United Kingdom) Dorothea Douglass	4–6, 4–6
11.	Win	1906	Cannes Championships	Clay	(Germany) Antonie Kusenberg Popp (Note: Played as Mme Popp name is listed between quotes in 18 April 1906 issue of Lawn Tennis and Badminton which indicates that it is a pseudonym.)	6–4, 6–4
12.	Win	1906	South of France Championships	Clay	(United Kingdom) Gwendoline Eastlake-Smith	6–4, 5–7, 6–3
7.	Loss	1907	Cannes Championships	Clay	(United Kingdom) Ruth Winch	0–6, 1–6
8.	Loss	1907	Welsh Championships	Grass	(United States) May Sutton	0–6, 5–7
