= Adine Masson =

French tennis player

- Tennis player Adine Masson in 1904
- Country (sports): France
- Turned pro: 1895 (amateur )
- Retired: 1913

Singles
- Career titles: 19

Françoise Adine Masson was a French tennis player. She won the French Championships five times 1897–1899, 1902~1903 (a closed event). She was active from 1895 to 1913 and contested 30 singles finals, winning 19 titles.

== Career ==
Masson was active at the end of the 19th century and beginning of the 20th century. The daughter of Armand Masson, the founder of the Tennis Club de Paris, in 1897 she became the first winner of the French Tennis Championship beating Suzanne Girod in two sets. She also won the championship in 1898 and 1899 because there was no opposition and in 1902 and 1903 against Girod and Kate Gillou respectively. In 1907 she won the inaugural French doubles championships partnering Yvonne de Pfeffel.

In 1904 she again reached the final but was beaten by Kate Gillou.

== Career finals (30) ==
X denotes All-Comers Final

=== Titles (19) ===
- 1895 - French Covered Court Championships
- 1896 - French Covered Court Championships
- 1897 - French Championships
- 1897 - French Covered Court Championships
- 1898 - French Championships
- 1898 - Saint Servan
- 1899 - French Championships
- 1900 - Engadine Championships
- 1902 - French Championships
- 1903 - French Championships
- 1904 - Swiss Championships
- 1904 - Championships of Pays-d'Enhaut
- 1905 - Les Avants Championship
- 1905 - Championships of Pays-d'Enhaut
- 1905 - Championships of Lucerne
- 1906 - Wiesbaden Championships
- 1907 - Championships of Lucerne
- 1908 - French Covered Court Championships
- 1909 - French Covered Court Championships

=== Runners-up (11) ===
- 1897 - Dinard Ladies Cup
- 1898 - Dinard Ladies Cup
- 1899 - Dinard Ladies Cup ×
- 1899 - Saint Servan
- 1900 - Swiss Championships
- 1901 - Boulogne Championship
- 1903 - British Covered Court Championships
- 1906 - Championships of Lucerne
- 1908 - North of France Championships
- 1908 - Lille
- 1911 - Le Touquet Spa Championships
