= South of France Championships =

South of France Championships Championnats du Sud de la France

Defunct tennis tournament
- Founded: 1895
- Abolished: 1971
- Editions: 76
- Location: Nice, France
- Venue: Nice Lawn Tennis Club
- Surface: Clay / outdoor

The South of France Championships, originally known as the Championnats du Sud de la France, and also known as the Championships of the South of France and the Championship of Southern France, was a tennis event held from 1895 through 1971. It was originally played at the Nice Lawn Tennis Club in Nice, France. It was one of the tournaments of the French Riviera tennis circuit.

== History ==
Lawn tennis was introduced to the French Riviera by English tourists, who decided to holiday on the Cote d'Azur after Queen Victoria vacationed there during the late 1800s. The Riviera season was usually December through to March with a number of events that would be staged in Nice. The South of France Championships in Nice was considered the best of these early continental tournament events. Other events founded around this time included the Nice Championships, the Nice Lawn Tennis Club Championships and later the Nice International. The Nice Lawn Tennis Club was founded in 1890 at Place Mozart. In 1895 the South of France Championships tournament began; the dates the event was held fluctuated between February, March and April annually. The club and championships changed location to Parc Imperial Avenue Suzanne Lenglen in 1923. It was one of the earliest events open to international players; the tournament survived for a period of 76 years until 1971.

== Finals ==
The final round of a tournament, in which the winner of a single-elimination phase faces the previous year's champion, who plays only that one match. The challenge round was used in the early history of tennis (from 1877 through 1921) in some tournaments not all. The * indicates the challenger.

=== Men's singles ===
Year	Champion	Runner-up	Score
1895	(France) A. F. Thomas	(Germany) Victor Voss	?
1896	(Italy) Joseph Hamilton De Robiglio	?	?
1897	(United Kingdom) Reginald Doherty	(Germany) Victor Voss	6–2, 6–4, 3–6, 6–1
1898	(United Kingdom) Laurence Doherty	(Scotland) James Robert Hay-Gordon	6–1, 6–2, 6–1
1899	(United Kingdom) Reginald Doherty (2)	(Germany) Victor Voss	6–0, 6–0, 6–0
1900	(United Kingdom) Laurence Doherty (2)	(United Kingdom) Reginald Doherty	walkover
1901	(United Kingdom) Laurence Doherty (3)	(United Kingdom) Wilberforce Eaves	6–2, 6–3, 6–2
1902	(United Kingdom) Laurence Doherty (4)	(United Kingdom) Reginald Doherty	walkover
1903	(United Kingdom) Laurence Doherty (5)	(United Kingdom) Sydney Howard Smith	5–7, 3–6, 6–3, 6–4, 6–3
1904	(United Kingdom) Laurence Doherty (6)	(United Kingdom) Major Ritchie	6–2, 6–3, 6–3
1905	(United Kingdom) Laurence Doherty (7)	(United Kingdom) Edward Roy Allen	6–3, 7–5, 7–5
1906	(United Kingdom) Laurence Doherty (8)	(New Zealand) Anthony Wilding	6–3, 8–6, 6–2
1907	(New Zealand) Anthony Wilding	(United Kingdom) Major Ritchie	6–0, 6–0, 6–3
1908	(New Zealand) Anthony Wilding (2)	(United Kingdom) Major Ritchie	6–0, 6–1, 6–2
1909	(United States) Fred Alexander	(United Kingdom) Major Ritchie	6–2, 6–1, 6–2
1910	(France) Max Decugis	(United Kingdom) Major Ritchie	6–2, 6–4, 3–6, 13–11
1911	(New Zealand) Anthony Wilding (3)	(France) Max Decugis	9–7, 6–0, 6–3
1912	(France) Max Decugis	(France) Maurice Germot	10–8, 4–6, 6–2 retd.
1913	(France) Max Decugis (2)	(Germany) Friedrich Wilhelm Rahe	7–9, 6–2, 6–3, 1–6, 6–3
1914	(New Zealand) Anthony Wilding (4)	(United Kingdom) Gordon Lowe	6–4, 6–4, 1–6, 6–2
1915/1918	Not held (due to world war one)		
1919	(France) Max Decugis (3)	(Kingdom of Romania) Nicolae Mișu	6–3, 6–2, 6–1
1920	(Russia) Mikhail Sumarokov-Elston	(France) Alain Gerbault	7–5, 6–2, 2–6, 3–6, 6–1
1921	(Russia) Mikhail Sumarokov-Elston (2)	(Kingdom of Italy) Mino Balbi De Robbeco	6–1, 6–1, 6–0
1922	(Russia) Mikhail Sumarokov-Elston (3)	(France) Henri Cochet	6–3, 6–3, 2–6, 7–5
1923	(United Kingdom) Gordon Lowe	(United Kingdom) Randolph Lycett	9–7, 3–6, 6–3, 6–2
1924	(France) René Lacoste	(Belgium) Jean Washer	6–1, 6–0, 3–6, 7–9, 6–3
1925	(France) René Lacoste (2)	(United Kingdom) Gordon Lowe	6–1, 6–4, 6–3
1926	(Kingdom of Italy) Uberto De Morpurgo	(France) Henri Cochet	1–6, 6–2, 6–3, 6–3
1927	(Austria) Hermann von Artens	(United Kingdom) Brame Hillyard	2–6, 5–7, 6–1, 6–3, 10–8
1928	(Switzerland) Charles Aeschlimann	(Republic of Ireland) George Lyttleton-Rogers	7–5, 9–7, 6–1
1929	(France) Emmanuel du Plaix	(Austria) Hermann von Artens	3–6, 6–1, 6–3, 6–0
1930	(United States) Bill Tilden	(Republic of Ireland) George Lyttleton-Rogers	4–6, 8–6, 6–1, 4–6, 6–0
1931	(Republic of Ireland) George Lyttleton-Rogers	(France) Christian Boussus	4–6, 0–6, 6–4, 6–4, 6–0
1932	(France) Jacques Brugnon	(Republic of Ireland) George Lyttleton-Rogers	6–2, 3–6, 2–6, 6–3, 6–2
1933	(Republic of Ireland) George Lyttleton-Rogers (2)	(Switzerland) Max Ellmer	6–3, 4–6, 6–4, 4–6, 8–6
1934	(Republic of Ireland) George Lyttleton-Rogers (3)	(Austria) Herman von Artens	2–6, 6–3, 2–6, 6–3, 6–2
1935	(United States) Wilmer Hines	(Switzerland) Max Ellmer	6–2, 3–6, 6–1, 6–4
1936	(France) Jean Lesueur	(United States) William W. Robertson	6–4, 6–4, 3–6, 6–3
1937	(Republic of China (1912–1949)) Kho Sin-Kie	(France) Jean Lesueur	13-11, 6–3, 4–6, 6–3
1938	(Republic of China (1912–1949)) Kho Sin-Kie (2)	(Switzerland) Max Ellmer	6–1, 2–6, 6–0, 8–6
1939	(Kingdom of Romania) Constantin Tănăsescu	(Republic of China (1912–1949)) Kho Sin-Kie	2–6, 6–2, 6–3, 6–1
1940/1943	Not held (due to world war two)		
1944	(France) Pierre Pellizza	(France) Henri Pellizza	6–2, 5–7, 6–3
1945	not played		
1946	(France) Pierre Pellizza (2)	(France) Yvon Petra	12-10, 5–7, 6–0, 6–1
1947	(Kingdom of Hungary (1920–1946)) József Asbóth	(Sweden) Torsten Johansson	6–2, 6–4, 6–3
1948	(Kingdom of Hungary (1920–1946)) József Asbóth (2)	(Czechoslovakia) Jaroslav Drobný	8–6, 6–1, 6–3
1949	(Democratic Federal Yugoslavia) Milan Branović	(Democratic Federal Yugoslavia) Dragutin Mitić	6–4, 6–8, 4–2 ret.
1950	(United States) Budge Patty	(United States) Tony Trabert	6–2, 6–4
1951	(Sweden) Sven Davidson	(United States) Straight Clark	6–4, 3–6, 1–6, 7–5, 6–2
1952	(South Africa) Owen Williams	(France) Igor Scherbatoff	6–1, 6–2
1953	(Brazil) Armando Vieira	(Hungary) József Asbóth	6–1, 6–1
1954	(United States) Tony Vincent	(France) Paul Rémy	6–3, 6–3, 6–1
1955	(Poland) Władysław Skonecki	(Egypt) Jaroslav Drobný	walkover
1956	(France) Paul Rémy	(France) Pierre Darmon	6–2, 6–1, 6–0
1957	(Belgium) Jacques Brichant	(United Kingdom) Bobby Wilson	9–11, 6–3, 6–2, 7–9, 6–4
1958	Not held (due to rain)		
1959	(Hungary) István Gulyás	(Denmark) Torben Ulrich	0–6, 4–6, 9–7 6–4, 3–3 retd.
1960	(Australia) Warren Woodcock	(Australia) Barry Phillips-Moore	6–3, 6–2, 6–1
1961	(France) Pierre Darmon	(Australia) Warren Woodcock	6–2, 6–4, 2–6, 6–1
1962	(France) Pierre Darmon (2)	(West Germany) Wilhelm Bungert	6–1, 6–1, 0–6, 6–2
1963	(France) Pierre Darmon (3)	(Hungary) István Gulyás	8–10, 6–3, 6–2, 7–5
1964	(Italy) Sergio Tacchini	(France) Jean-Noël Grinda	6–4, 4–0 ret.
1965	(Hungary) István Gulyás (2)	(Czechoslovakia) Milan Holeček	6–1, 6–1, 7–5
1966	(Hungary) István Gulyás (3)	(France) Daniel Contet	6–1, 6–0, 13–11
1967	(France) Jean-Pierre Courcol	(Ecuador) Eduardo Zuleta	6–2, 2–6, 2–6, 6–3, 6–4
1968	(Soviet Union) Alex Metreveli	(Australia) Barry Phillips-Moore	9–7, 5–7, 6–2, 6–4
↓ Open era ↓
1969	(France) Georges Goven	(France) Daniel Contet	6-3, 6-1, ret.
1970	(France) Jean-François Caujolle	(France) Jean-Loup Rouyer	5–7, 6–1, 6–3

=== Women's singles ===
(Incomplete roll)

Year	Champions	Runners-up	Score
1899	(United Kingdom) Mildred Brooksmith	(France) Marguerite Chalier	6–3, 6–0
1900	(Germany) Clara von der Schulenburg		
1901	(United Kingdom) Blanche Hillyard	(Germany) Clara von der Schulenburg	6–4, 6–3
1902	(Germany) Clara von der Schulenburg (2)	(United Kingdom) Mildred Brooksmith	6–3, 6–3
1903	(United Kingdom) Toupie Lowther	(Germany) Clara von der Schulenburg	1–6, 6–1, 6–2
1904	(Germany) Clara von der Schulenburg (3)	(France) de Robiglio	8–6, 7–5
1905	(United Kingdom) Connie Wilson	(Germany) Clara von der Schulenburg	6–1, 2–6, 6–4
1906	(United Kingdom) Toupie Lowther (2)	(United Kingdom) Gladys Eastlake-Smith	6–4, 5–7, 6–3
1907	(United Kingdom) Gladys Eastlake-Smith	(Austria-Hungary) Margit Madarász	10–8, 6–1
1908	(United Kingdom) Dorothea Lambert Chambers	(United Kingdom) Rosamund Salusbury	6–1, 6–1
1909	(Germany) Clara von der Schulenburg (4)	(United Kingdom) Jessie Tripp	6–1, 6–8, 6–0
1910	(United Kingdom) Rosamund Salusbury	(Germany) Clara von der Schulenburg	6–4, 3–6, 6–3
1911	(Germany) Dagmar von Krohn	(Germany) Hedwig Neresheimer	6–2, 2–6, 6–3
1912	(United Kingdom) Jessie Tripp	(United Kingdom) Margaret Tripp	default
1913	(Germany) Dagmar von Krohn (2)	(United Kingdom) Blanche Colston	6–3, 6–1
1914	(United Kingdom) Dorothea Lambert Chambers (2)	(United Kingdom) M Stuart	6–2, 6–0
1915/1918	Not held (due to world war one)		
1919	(France) Suzanne Lenglen	(United Kingdom) Doris Wolfson	6–0, 6–0
1920	(United Kingdom) Geraldine Beamish	(France) Suzanne Lenglen	default
1921	(France) Suzanne Lenglen (2)	(France) M. Septier	6–1, 6–1
1922	(United States) Elizabeth Ryan	(United Kingdom) Geraldine Beamish	3–6, 6–3, 6–1
1923	(France) Suzanne Lenglen (3)	(United States) Elizabeth Ryan	6–1, 6–0
1924	(France) Suzanne Lenglen (4)	(United Kingdom) Phyllis Covell	6–2, 6–1
1925	(France) Suzanne Lenglen (5)	(United Kingdom) Ermyntrude Harvey	walkover
1926	(United States) Helen Wills	(United States) Isabella Mumford	6–0, 6–1
1927	(Spain) Lilí Álvarez	(United Kingdom) Phyllis Satterthwaite	6–3, 6–3
1928	(Weimar Republic) Paula von Reznicek	(Weimar Republic) Cilly Aussem	6–3, 6–2
1929	(Weimar Republic) Paula von Reznicek (2)	(United Kingdom) Phyllis Covell	6–8, 6–2, 6–4
1930	(Weimar Republic) Cilly Aussem	(United States) Carolyn Hirsch	6–0, 6–2
1931	(United Kingdom) Phyllis Satterthwaite	(France) Paulette Marjollet	6–1, 6–3
1932	(United States) Elizabeth Ryan (2)	(United Kingdom) Phyllis Satterthwaite	6–3, 1–6, 6–2
1933	(United Kingdom) Sheila Hewitt	(Nazi Germany) Cilly Aussem	6–4, 6–3
1934	(United Kingdom) Muriel Thomas	(United Kingdom) Mary Hardwick	6–1, 6–0
1935	(France) Simonne Mathieu	(France) Edith Belliard	10–12, 7–5, 6–3
1936	(France) Simonne Mathieu (2)	(United Kingdom) Phyllis Satterthwaite	6–1, 6–0
1937	(France) Simonne Mathieu (3)	(Chile) Anita Lizana	6–3, 2–6, 7–5
1938	(United States) Gracyn Wheeler	(United Kingdom) Gem Hoahing	6–4, 6–2
1939	(France) Simonne Mathieu (4)	(United States) Gracyn Wheeler	6–0, 6–2
1940/1945	Not held (due to world war two)		
1946	Event not held		
1947	(Luxembourg) Alice Weiwers	?	?
1948	(Italy) Annelies Ullstein Bossi	?	?
1949	(Belgium) Myriam De Borman	?	?
1950	(United States) Gussie Moran	(France) Josette Amouretti	6–0, 6–0
1951	(United States) Doris Hart	(United States) Shirley Fry	4–6, 6–3, 6–3
1952	(Hungary) Márta Peterdy	?	?
1953	(United Kingdom) Joan Curry	(United Kingdom) Shirley Bloomer	6–4, 6–1
1954	(United Kingdom) Joan Curry (2)	(Belgium) Christiane Mercelis	7–5, 6-8, 12–10
1955	(France) Anne-Marie Seghers	(United Kingdom) Joan Curry	6–1, 6–4
1956	(Belgium) Christiane Mercelis	(Brazil) Ingrid Metzner	6–0, 7–5
1957	(Belgium) Christiane Mercelis (2)	(France) Jacqueline Kermina	4–6, 6–1, 6–1
1958	Not held (due to rain)		
1959	(Mexico) Yola Ramírez	(France) Paule Courteix	6–2, 6–4
1960	(West Germany) Edda Buding	(West Germany) Renate Ostermann	4–6, 6–3, 8–6
1961	(Australia) Margaret Smith	(France) Flo de la Courtie	9–7, 6–4
1962	(Hungary) Zsuzsa Körmöczy	(United Kingdom) Rita Bentley	6–4, 6–4
1963	(Australia) Jan Lehane	(France) Janine Lieffrig	7–5, 6–2
1964	(West Germany) Almut Sturm	(Belgium) Christiane Mercelis	0–6, 6–2, 6–4
1965	(West Germany) Helga Schultze	(Australia) Jill Blackman	7–5, 6–2
1966	(Austria) Sonja Pachta	(Australia) Jill Blackman	6–4, 6–4
1967	(United Kingdom) Winnie Shaw	(Australia) Joan Gibson Cottrill	6–4, 6–2
1968	(Australia) Gail Sherriff	(United Kingdom) Robin Blakelock-Lloyd	9–7, 6–4
↓ Open era ↓
1969	(United States) Peaches Bartkowicz	(France) Gail Sherriff Chanfreau	6–3, 6–4
1970	(West Germany) Helga Niessen	(United States) Julie Heldman	6–1, 6–1
1971	(United Kingdom) Jill Cooper	(Netherlands) Marijke Schaar	6–1, 6–1

== Records ==
=== Men's singles ===
Source: The Tennisbase included

- Most titles: (United Kingdom) Laurence Doherty, (8)
- Most consecutive titles: (United Kingdom) Laurence Doherty, (7)
- Most finals: (United Kingdom) Laurence Doherty, (8)
- Most consecutive finals: (United Kingdom) Laurence Doherty, (7)
- Most matches played: (France) Pierre Darmon, (39)
- Most matches won: (France) Pierre Darmon, (33)
- Most consecutive match wins: (New Zealand) Anthony Wilding, and (United Kingdom) Laurence Doherty, (19)
- Most editions played: (France) Georges Goven, (12)
- Best match winning %: (United Kingdom) Laurence Doherty and (United Kingdom) Reginald Doherty (100%)
- Longest final: (France) Jacques Brichant v (United Kingdom) Bobby Wilson, result: 9–11, 6–3, 6–2, 7–9, 6–4 (63 games), (1957)
- Shortest final: (Brazil) Armando Vieira v (Hungary) József Asbóth, result: 6–1, 6–1 (14 games) (1953)
- Shortest final: (Italy) Sergio Tacchini v (France) Jean-Noël Grinda, result: 6–4, 4–0 retired (14 games) (1964)
- Title won with the fewest games lost, (New Zealand) Anthony Wilding, (12), (1908)
- Oldest champion: (United Kingdom) Gordon Lowe, 38y 8m and 23d, (1923)
- Youngest champion: (France) René Lacoste, 19y 8m and 9d, (1924)

== See also ==
- Monte-Carlo Masters
- Open de Nice Côte d'Azur

== Sources ==
- Little, Allan (2014). The Golden Days of Tennis on the French Riviera, 1874-1939. London: Wimbledon Lawn Tennis Museum. ISBN 978-0906741542.
- Ayre's Lawn Tennis Almanack And Tournament Guide, A. Wallis Myers. UK.
- Dunlop Lawn Tennis Almanack And Tournament Guide, G.P. Hughes, 1939 to 1958, Published by Dunlop Sports Co. Ltd, UK.
- Lowe's Lawn Tennis Annuals and Compendia, Lowe, Sir F. Gordon, Eyre & Spottiswoode.
