= Mildred Brooksmith =

English tennis player (1866–1944)

- Full name: Ethel Mildred Brooksmith
- Country (sports): United Kingdom
- Born: c.1866 England
- Died: 13 or 14 April 1944 (age 78) Kensington, London, England
- Turned pro: 1897 (amateur)
- Retired: 1924

Singles
- Career titles: 19

Grand Slam singles results
- Wimbledon: 3R (1909)

Doubles

Grand Slam doubles results
- Wimbledon: QF (1913)

Grand Slam mixed doubles results
- Wimbledon: 2R (1913)

Ethel Mildred Brooksmith (c. 1866 – 13 or 14 April 1944) was an English tennis player. She was a quarter-finalist at the 1913 Wimbledon Championships in the women's doubles event. She was active from 1892 to 1924 and won 19 career singles titles.

== Career ==
Brooksmith was born circa 1866. She competed in three events at the Wimbledon Championships in 1909 and 1913. Most of her singles successes came when she played on the French Riviera circuit between 1897 and 1903, and at tournaments in Switzerland between 1892 and 1910.

She played and won her first tournament at the Lake Geneva Championships at the Montreux Lawn Tennis Club, Montreux, Switzerland in April 1895. Her biggest international singles title wins came at the Nice LTC Championships four times (1897–1899, 1901), the Swiss International Championships which she won three times consecutivley (1899–1901), she won the inaugural South of France Championships for women in Cannes in 1899 against France's Marguerite Chalier, and the Championships of Pays-d'Enhaut (1899), the Maloja International (1901), She also won the Riviera Championships (1903) and the Ceylon Championships (1909).

In addition she was a three time losing finalist at the Monte Carlo Championships (1901–1903), the French Switzerland Championships (1908), Les Avants Championship (1908–1910), the Geneva Championships (1910).

Her main British career singles highlights included winning the Rochester Open three times in (1909, 1911, 1912), the East Grinstead Open in (1910), the Bungay Open (1911). She was also a losing finalist at the Essex Championships in 1909 to Agnes Morton. She played and won her final singles tournament at the Aldeburgh Open in late August 1911. Mildred continued to play doubles and mixed doubles until 1924 well into her 50s at this point.

She died in Kensington, London, England in April 1944, she was a spinster and never married.
