= Axel Petersen =

Axel Petersen may refer to:

- Axel Petersen (athlete) (1880–1962), Danish athlete
- Axel Petersen (footballer) (1887–1968), Danish amateur footballer
