= Geneva International Championships =

Geneva International Championships Championnats Internationaux de Genève

Defunct tennis tournament
- Tour: ILTF Circuit (1913-38)
- Founded: 1899; 127 years ago
- Abolished: 1976; 50 years ago
- Location: Geneva, Switzerland
- Venue: Various
- Surface: Clay (outdoors)

The Geneva International Championships or Championnats Internationaux de Genève was a men's and women's open international clay court tennis tournament founded in 1899 as the Geneva Championships and first staged at the Tennis Club of Geneva Eaux-Vives (f.1896), Parc des Eaux Vives, Geneva, Switzerland. The tournament was also known as the Coupe Certina for sponsorship reason in the early 1970s and was discontinued in 1976.

== History ==
The Geneva Championships were first held in August 1908 and played at the Tennis Club of Geneva Eaux-Vives (f.1898), Parc des Eaux Vives, Geneva, Switzerland. The tournament was not held between 1914 and 1915 during World War I. During World War II it was not held in 1939 and 1946 thereafter.

The championships resumed in 1947 and continued until 1972 when the Swiss watch maker company Certina SA took over sponsorship of the event and the tournament was known as the Coupe Certina. In 1976 the championships were discontinued. It was replaced by the Geneva Open that was established earlier in 1967 at the original venue of this event the Tennis Club de Geneva that is still staged today.

== Venues ==
The event was predominantly played at the Tennis Club of Geneva Eaux-Vives, founded in Geneva in 1896, but on occasions was staged at other venues such as Tennis Club Servette in1940. The Tennis Club Drizia-Miremont (f.1930) staged the tournament from 1972 till 1976.

== Past finals ==
=== Men's Singles ===
(incomplete roll)

Year	Champion	Runner-up	Score
1899	(United Kingdom) T.A. Airey	(United Kingdom) Bernard Wood-Hill	1–6, 6–3, 6–4, 6–?
1908	(France) Robert Wallet	(United States) Clarence Pell	3–6, 6–2, 6–3, 6–3
1909	(United Kingdom) George Logie	(Australia) Les Poidevin	3–6, retd.
1910	(United States) R. Norris Williams	(France) A. Félix Poulin	6–4, 6–3, 6–0
1911	(United States) R. Norris Williams (2)	(Italy) Gino De Martino	2–6, 6–1, 3–6, 6–2, 6–1
1912	(France) André Chancerel	(Switzerland) Charles Barde	6–3, 4–6, 4–6, 6–0, 6–4
1913	(Italy) Uberto De Morpurgo	(Germany) Erik Strauss	8–6, 2–6, 6–4, 6–4
1916	(Ireland) Charles Martin	(Switzerland) Mr Clason	6–1, 6–3, 6–4
1917	(United States) Edmund Harran	(Switzerland) Louis Amman	8–6, 6–1, 6–1
1918	(Ireland) Charles Martin (2)	(Switzerland) Marcus Henneberg	6–3, 6–1, 6–0
1919	(Republic of Ireland) Charles Martin (3)	(India) Sydney Jacob	9–7, 1–6, 6–2, 6–4
1922	(France) Léonce Aslangul	(France) Jean de Faucamberge	6–4, 6–3, 6–1
1923	(Greece) Augustos Zerlendis	(Switzerland) Hector Fisher	6–2, 7–5, 6–1
1924	(Switzerland) Pablo Debran	(Kingdom of Yugoslavia) Đorđe Dunđerski	6–4, 6–3, 8–6
1925	(Greece) Augustos Zerlendis (2)	(Kingdom of Yugoslavia) Đorđe Dunđerski	6–1, 6–2, 6–1
1926	(Italy) Giorgio De Stefani	(Switzerland) Charles Aeschlimann	6–2, 6–8, 6–3, 8–6
1927	(Switzerland) Jean Wuarin	(South Africa) Craig H.Campbell	6–2, 6–2, 6–2
1931	(France) Georges Glasser	(France) Antoine Gentien	walkover
1932	(France) Antoine Gentien	(United Kingdom) Arthur Vinall	6–0, 6–3, 6–1
1934	(France) Antoine Gentien (2)	(Switzerland) Boris Maneff	6–3, 6–4, 6–3
1935	(Switzerland) Boris Maneff	(Switzerland) Jean Wuarin	4–6, 6–3, 6–2, 7–5
1936	(Switzerland) Boris Maneff (2)	(France) Marcel Bernard	1–6, 2–6, 7–5, 6–2, 8–6
1937	(China) Kho Sin-Khie	(France) Antoine Gentien	6–4, 7–5, 6–3
1938	(Switzerland) Boris Maneff (3)	(Switzerland) Hector Fisher	3–6, 8–6, 6–1, 6–1
1940	(Switzerland) Georges Grange	(Switzerland) Jean Wuarin	6–2, 7–5, 3–6, 6–3
1941	(Switzerland) Boris Maneff (4)	(Switzerland) Georges Grange	6–4, 6–3, 6–0
1942	(Switzerland) Boris Maneff (5)	(France) Bernard Destremau	6–3, 6–4, 6–4
1943	(Switzerland) Boris Maneff (6)	(Switzerland) Marcel Robert-Tissot	6–2, 6–0, 4–6, 6–2
1944	(France) André Jacquemet	(Switzerland) Georges Grange	7–5, 2–6, 7–5
1948	(Spain) Jaime Bartroli	(Switzerland) Georges Grange	6–3, 6–4, 6–8, 3–6, 6–2
1960	(Cuba) Orlando Calleja	(Australia) Alan Lane	6–1, 6–1
1962	(India) Premjit Lall	(Brazil) Carlos Fernandes	6–3, 3–6, 6–3
1963	(Australia) Allan Kendall	(France) Pierre Loizeau	6–1, 6–4
1967	(Switzerland) Thedy Stalder	(Germany) Wilhelm Burgemeister	6–2, 6–2
1968	(Switzerland) Dimitri Sturdza	(Czechoslovakia) František Pala	6–2, 2–6, 6–3
1969	(Czechoslovakia) František Pala	(Switzerland) Dimitri Sturdza	6–4, 7–5
1970	(Switzerland) Dimitri Sturdza (2)	(France) Jean-Claude Barclay	6–4, 7–5
1971	(Poland) Tadeusz Nowicki	(Poland) Wieslaw Gasiorek	6–0, 5–7, 6–0, 6–4
1972	(France) Daniel Contet	(France) Jean-Claude Barclay	1–6, 6–3, 6–3, 7–6
1973	(France) Daniel Contet (2)	(Greece) Nicky Kalogeropoulos	6–1, 6–4, 6–2
1974	(France) Jean-Claude Barclay	(South Africa) David Schneider	6–1, 6–0
1975	(Czechoslovakia) Jan Kukal	(Greece) Nicky Kalogeropoulos	6–3, 2–6, 6–4
1976	(Socialist Federal Republic of Yugoslavia) Žarko Buric	(Czechoslovakia) Jan Kukal	6–3, 6–3

=== Womens Singles ===
(incomplete roll)

Year	Champion	Runner-up	Score
1908	(United Kingdom) Aurea Edgington	(United Kingdom) Elsie Lane	6–2, 6–1
1909	(United Kingdom) Aurea Edgington (2)	(Germany) Hedwig Neresheimer	4–6, 8–6, 6–0
1910	(United Kingdom) Aurea Edgington (3)	(United Kingdom) Mildred Brooksmith	6–0, 6–2
1911	(Germany) Hedwig Neresheimer	(France) Cécile Matthey	6–2, 6–0
1912	(France) Mme R. Vlasto	(Portugal) Angelica Plantier	6–1, 3–6, 6–3
1913	(France) Germaine Golding	(France) Cécile Matthey	1–6, 6–1, 6–3
1914–15	Tournament not held		
1916	(Switzerland) Renée de Morsier	(Portugal) Angelica Plantier	5–7, 6–3, 7–5
1917	(Switzerland) Renée de Morsier (2)	(France) Magda Aranyi	6–4, 6–2
1918	(France) Germaine Golding (2)	(Switzerland) Renée de Morsier	6–3, 6–3
1919	(France) Germaine Golding (3)	(Switzerland) Frl Kärcher	6–0, 6–2
1920	(France) Germaine Golding (4)	(Switzerland) Frl Kärcher	6–0, 6–1
1922	(France) Geneviève Cousin	(France) Germaine Golding	6–4, 7–5
1923	(France) Germaine Golding (5)	(United Kingdom) Winifred Sautter	6–1, 6–0
1924	(France) Germaine Golding (6)	(United Kingdom) Winifred Sautter	6–0, 6–3
1926	(United Kingdom) Mme Brown	(United Kingdom) K. Brown	6–4, 6–3
1930	(Switzerland) Lolette Payot	(France) Cosette Saint-Omer-Roy	6–4, 7–5
1931	(Switzerland) Lolette Payot (2)	(Germany) Ilse Friedleben	7–5, 3–6, 6–3
1932	(Switzerland) Lolette Payot (3)	(Romania) Lenke Zissovits	6–0, 6–0
1933	(Switzerland) Lolette Payot (4)	(Germany) Paula Stuck	7–5, 6–2
1934	(Switzerland) Lolette Payot (5)	(France) Ida Adamoff	6–2, 7–5
1935	(Switzerland) Mme Marton	(Switzerland) Jetti Sutter	8–6, 6–2
1936	(United Kingdom) Effie Peters	(United Kingdom) Billie Yorke	won?
1938	(France) Mauricette L'Huillier	(France) Mme Boissière	6–3, 6–2
