= Swiss International Championships =

Defunct tennis tournament
- Tour: Men's Amateur Tour (1877–1912); Women's Amateur Tour (1877–1912); ILTF Men's Amateur Tour (1913–1967); ILTF Women's Amateur Tour (1913–1967)
- Founded: 1897
- Abolished: 1968
- Location: Various, Switzerland
- Venue: Various
- Surface: outdoor (clay)

The Swiss International Championships or simply the Swiss Championships was a combined men's and women's clay court tennis tournament established by the Swiss Lawn Tennis Association, and first played at Grasshopper Club, Zurich, Switzerland in 1897 as the Championship of Switzerland. The championships were then held annually and alternated between different venues until 1968. In 1969 the tournament was renamed the Swiss Open International Championships or simply Swiss Open Championships and were then staged permanently at Gstaad. From 1977 the women's tournament was staged at Lausanne and was called the WTA Swiss Open, today that event is branded as the Ladies Open Lausanne.

== History ==
The first early edition of the Championship of Switzerland, was played at the Grasshopper Club, Zurich, Switzerland under the auspices of the Swiss Lawn Tennis Association, the winner of the men's event was presented with a cup valued at 500 francs. In 1898 the Swiss Lawn Tennis Association staged the event at Château-d'Œx. In 1899 an open women's singles event was added to the schedule, when the venue was still in St. Moritz. In 1969 the tournament continued into the open era branded as the Swiss Open Championships and held permanently at Gstaad the men's event is still active today known as the Swiss Open. The women's event in 1968 was held at Lugano. In 1969 the women's then returned to Gstaad. In 1977 the women's tournament was rebranded as the WTA Swiss Open until 1981 when that event was moved to Lugano. The women's event today is known as the Ladies Open Lausanne held at Lausanne, Switzerland.

Former notable winners of men's singles include; André Vacherot (1903), George Simond (1905), R. Norris Williams (1911), Gottfried von Cramm (1934–1935), Kho Sin-Kie (1938), Jaroslav Drobný (1946), Roy Emerson (1959–1961, 1966–1967), Rod Laver (1962), Nicola Pietrangeli (1963) and Rafael Osuna (1964).

In the women's singles event notable winners include; Charlotte Cooper Sterry (1902), Adine Masson (1904), Elsie Lane (1907), Germaine Régnier Golding (1921–1922, 1924), Lolette Payot (1931, 1933–1934), Louis Brough (1950), Christine Truman (1959), Maria Bueno (1960) and Margaret Smith (1962, 1964).

== Host locations ==
The Swiss International Championships were staged at the following locations throughout its run including Basel, Champéry, Geneva, Gstaad, Les Avants, Montreux, Lausanne, Lugano, Lucerne, Ragatz, St. Moritz, Zermatt, and Zurich from 1897 to 1967.

== Finals ==
=== Men's singles ===
Incomplete roll

Year	Location	Champion	Runner-up	Score
1897	Zurich	(Austria) Paul Von Herz Hertenried	(France) Francis Louis Fassitt	?
1898	Château-d'Œx	(England) Robert Baldwin Hough	(Switzerland) Maurice Albert Turrettini	6–2, 6–2, 6–1
1899	St. Moritz	(England) George Simond	(England) Robert Baldwin Hough	6–0, 6–1
1900	Château-d'Œx	(United Kingdom) E.K. Harvey	(England) Robert Baldwin Hough	6–3, 5–7, 6–4, ret.
1901	St. Moritz	(United States) Major Edmund Bela Joseph Harran	(England) St. John Douglass Stewart	4–6, 6–2, 6–1, 6–4
1902	Ragatz	(Switzerland) Georges Patry	(England) Robert Baldwin Hough	11–9, 3–6, 6–3, 6–2
1903	St. Moritz	(France) André Vacherot	?	?
1904	Les Avants	(United States) Artimus Holmes	(Switzerland) Georges Patry	6–0, 6–1, 6–4
1905	St. Moritz	(England) George Simond (2)	(England) St. John Douglass Stewart	w.o.
1906	Montreux	(England) Dunstan Rhodes	(Australia) Les Poidevin	w.o.
1907	St. Moritz	(Germany) Otto Mario Widmann	(United Kingdom) E. Morris Hall	3–6, 6–1, 6–3, 4–6, 7–5
1908	Château-d'Œx	(England) Algernon Kingscote	(United Kingdom) Charles Gladstone Allen	w.o.
1909	Geneva	(England) George Kirkland Logie	(Australia) Les Poidevin	3–6, 6–2, 11–9
1910	St. Moritz	(Germany) Heinrich Kleinschroth	(United States) J. de K. Bowen	6–1, 6–2, 6–0
1911	Lucerne	(United States) R. Norris Williams	(Germany) Heinrich Kleinschroth	6–2, 7–5, 6–0
1912	Montreux	(France) Max Decugis	(France) André Chancerel	8–6, 6–0, ret.
1913	St. Moritz	(Germany) Robert Kleinschroth	(Germany) Moritz von Bissing	?
1914	Not held (due to World War I)			
1915	Zermatt	(United States) Major Edmund Bela Joseph Harran	Pierre Farjon	6–2, 6–2, 2–6, 6–2
1916	Zurich	(United States) Major Edmund Bela Joseph Harran (2)	?	?
1917	Lausanne	(United States) Major Edmund Bela Joseph Harran (3)	(Hungary) A. György Dungyersky	6–4, 2–6, 7–5
1918	Basel	(Switzerland) Maurice Albert Turrettini		?
1919	Geneva	(Belgium) Paul de Borman	(Switzerland) Armand Simon	6–3, 6–4, 6–4
1920	Zurich	(Switzerland) Hans G. Syz	?	?
1921	Zurich	(Switzerland) Maurice A. Ferrier	?	?
1922	St. Moritz	(France) Jean Couiteas de Faucamberge	(France) Léonce Aslangul	6–4, 7–5, 6–4
1923	Villars	(Greece) Augustos Zerlendis	?	?
1924	Lucerne	(France) W. Lasch	(Switzerland) André Chancerel	6–3, 6–1, 6–1
1925	Champery	(Germany) Willi Hannemann	(Austria) Ludwig von Salm-Hoogstraeten	?
1926	Geneva	(Italy) Giorgio de Stefani	(Switzerland) Charles Aeschlimann	6–2, 6–8, 6–3, 8–6
1927	Geneva	(Switzerland) Jean Wuarin	(South Africa) Craig Campbell	6–2, 6–2, 6–2
1928	Zurich	(Switzerland) A. Ernst	(Switzerland) Will Ehrenreich	6–1, 6–8, 6–3, 6–4
1929	Geneva	(Japan) Yoshiro Ota	(Denmark) Erik Worm	4–6, 6–4, 4–6, 6–1, 6–3
1930	Lucerne	(Japan) Hyotaro Sato	(Greece) Orestes Garangiotis	6–1, 6–0, 4–6, 6–4
1931	Montreux	(Italy) Giorgio de Stefani (2)	(Italy) Emanuele Sertorio	6–1, 6–2, 6–3
1932	Basel	(France) Philippe Gajan	(Switzerland) Max Ellmer	6–3, 1–6, 12–10, 9–7
1933	Geneva	(France) Roland Journu	(Switzerland) Charles Aeschlimann	7–5, 12–10, 6–4
1934	Lucerne	(Nazi Germany) Gottfried von Cramm	(Poland) Adam Baworowski	6–2, 6–0, 6–4
1935	Geneva	(Nazi Germany) Gottfried von Cramm (2)	(Switzerland) Max Ellmer	6–0, 6–3, 6–4
1936	Lucerne	(Italy) Giorgio de Stefani	(Republic of China (1912–1949)) Kho Sin-Kie	6–1, 2–6, 2–6, 6–4, 6–4
1937	Gstaad	(Switzerland) Boris Maneff	(Switzerland) Max Ellmer	6–3, 8–6, ret.
1938	Lucerne	(Republic of China (1912–1949)) Kho Sin-Kie	(France) Roland Journu	6–1, 6–4
1939	Zurich	(Italy) Francesco Romanoni	(France) Christian Boussus	4–6, 6–1, 4–6, 9–7, 6–3
1940/1945	Not held (due to world war two)			
1946	Lucerne	(Czechoslovakia) Jaroslav Drobný	(Italy) Marcello Del Bello	9–7, 6–2, 1–6, 6–1
1947	Geneva	(Italy) Gianni Cucelli	(South Africa) Eric Sturgess	6–4 4–6 7–5 6–4
1948	The championships were held at Gstaad, but the semi-finals and final was not played			
1949	Gstaad	(United States) Earl Cochell	(Czechoslovakia) Jaroslav Drobný	3–6, 6–3, 2–6, 6–3, 7–5
1950	Lausanne	(South Africa) Eric Sturgess	(United States) Vic Seixas	6–4, 7–5, 3–6, 6–2
1951	Lucerne	(South Africa) Leon Norgarb	(South Africa) Sydney Levy	9–7, 4–6, 6–4, 6–4
1952	Gstaad	(United States) Herbert Flam	(United States) Irvin Dorfman	6–4, 6–2, 6–1
1953	Lugano	(Australia) Rex Hartwig	(Poland) Władysław Skonecki	6–4, 6–2, 6–1
1954	Gstaad	(Australia) Lew Hoad	(Australia) Neale Fraser	6–4, 11–9, 6–4
1955	Gstaad	(United States) Arthur Larsen	(Argentina) Enrique Morea	6–4, 2–6, 6–2, 6–2
1956	Lugano	(Australia) Neale Fraser	(Sweden) Ulf Schmidt	8–6 2–6 2–6 3–6 6–3
1957	Gstaad	(United States) Budge Patty	(Egypt) Jaroslav Drobný	3–6, 6–3, 6–3, 6–1
1958	Gstaad	(Australia) Ashley Cooper	(Australia) Neale Fraser	2–6, 3–6, 7–5, 6–4, 6–3
1959	Lugano	(Australia) Roy Emerson	(United Kingdom) Billy Knight	6–3, 6–4, 6–3
1960	Gstaad	(Australia) Roy Emerson (2)	(United Kingdom) Mike Davies	6–4, 9–7, 6–2
1961	Gstaad	(Australia) Roy Emerson (3)	(Chile) Luis Ayala	6–3, 6–1, 6–0
1962	Lugano	(Australia) Rod Laver	(India) Ramanathan Krishnan	6–4, 6–2
1963	Gstaad	(Italy) Nicola Pietrangeli	(Australia) Roy Emerson	7–5, 6–2, 6–2
1964	Gstaad	(Brazil) Thomaz Koch	(Brazil) Ronald Barnes	6–3, 6–1, 7–9, 7–5
1965	Lugano	(Romania) Ion Țiriac	(Australia) Fred Stolle	divided title
1966	Gstaad	(Australia) Roy Emerson (4)	(Spain) Manuel Santana	5–7, 7–5, 6–3
1967	Gstaad	(Australia) Roy Emerson (5)	(Spain) Manuel Santana	6–2, 8–6, 6–4
1968	Lugano	(Romania) Ion Țiriac	(Netherlands) Tom Okker	6–8, 7–5, 6–0
Open era
For the open era event see Swiss Open

=== Women's singles ===
Incomplete roll

Year	Location	Champion	Runner-up	Score
1899	St. Moritz	(United Kingdom) Mildred Brooksmith	(United Kingdom) Miss Stephenson	6–1, 6–1
1900	Château-d'Œx	(United Kingdom) Mildred Brooksmith (2)	(France) Adine Masson	6–3, 1–6, 6–4
1901	St. Moritz	(United Kingdom) Mildred Brooksmith (3)	(Switzerland) H. Couppa	6–0, 6–0
1902	Ragatz	(United Kingdom) Charlotte Cooper Sterry	(France) Mlle Simon	6–1, 6–2
1903	St. Moritz	(France) Yvonne Prévost	(Greece) Domini Elliadi	?
1904	Les Avants	(France) Adine Masson	(France) Yvonne de Pfeffel	6–1, 6–4
1905	St. Moritz	(England) Ruth Winch	?	?
1906	Montreux	(United States) Vera Warden	(United Kingdom) Rosamund Salusbury	6–8, 6–1, 6–3
1907	St. Moritz	(England) Elsie Lane	(United Kingdom) Mrs Anderson	w.o.
1908	Château-d'Œx	(United States) Virginia MacVeagh	(United Kingdom) Mildred Brooksmith	w.o.
1909	Geneva	(United Kingdom) Aurea Edgington	(France) Jeanne Matthey	6–1, 6–1
1910	St. Moritz	(United Kingdom) Aurea Edgington (2)	(Belgium) Jeanne Liebrechts	6–0, 6–3
1911	Lucerne	(United Kingdom) Aurea Edgington (3)	(France) Germaine Régnier	6–0, 7–5
1912	Montreux	(United Kingdom) Aurea Edgington (4)	(United Kingdom) Domini Elliadi Crosfield	6–1, 6–4
1913	St. Moritz	(United Kingdom) Eveline Froude-Bellew Crundall-Punnett	(United Kingdom) Domini Elliadi Crosfield	6–2, 5–7, 6–2
1914	Not held (due to World War I)			
1915	Zermatt	(France) Daisy Speranza	(Switzerland) G. Matossian	6–3, 6–3
1916	Zurich	(France) Magda Aranyi	?	?
1917	Lausanne	(Switzerland) / (United Kingdom) Renee de Morsier	(France) Germaine Golding	6–4, 7–5
1918	Basel	(Switzerland) Mme Prince	(Switzerland) Blanche Müller	?
1919	Geneva	(Belgium) Anne de Borman	(Switzerland) Frl Kärcher	6–3, 6–3
1920	Zurich	(Switzerland) Miss C. Lang	?	? Mme M. Monk
1921	Lausanne	(France) Germaine Golding	Mme M. Monk	6–0, 6–0
1922	St. Moritz	(France) Germaine Golding (2)	(Switzerland) Frau Froehlichen	6–1, 6–1
1923	Villars	(Belgium) Madeleine de Prelle de la Nieppe	?	?
1924	Lucerne	(France) Germaine Golding (3)	(Switzerland) Miss Lane	6–4, 4–6, 6–4
1925	Champery	(United Kingdom) Madeline Fisher O'Neill	(United Kingdom) Mrs Pitman	?
1926	Zurich	(Denmark) Elsebeth Brehm	(Switzerland) Frau Steinfels	6–3, 6–1
1927	Lugano	(United Kingdom) Domini Elliadi Crosfield	?	?
1928	Zurich	(Switzerland) Frau Steinfels	(Switzerland) Emmy Schäublin	6–2, 6–3
1929	Geneva	(Spain) Bella Dutton de Pons	(Switzerland) Lolette Payot	6–3, 3–6, 9–7
1930	Lucerne	(Germany) Ilse Friedleben	(Switzerland) Lolette Payot	4–6, 6–2, 10–8
1931	Montreux	(Switzerland) Lolette Payot	(Italy) Lucia Valerio	6–4, 5–7, 6–3
1932	Basel	(France) Rosie Berthet	(France) Jacqueline Goldschmidt	6–2, 5–7, 6–2
1933	Geneva	(Switzerland) Lolette Payot (2)	(Nazi Germany) Paula Stuck	7–5, 6–2
1934	Lucerne	(Switzerland) Lolette Payot (3)	(France) Colette Rosambert	6–2, 8–6
1935	Geneva	(France) Simone Passermard Mathieu	(France) Colette Rosambert Boegner	6–2, 6–2
1936	Lucerne	(Denmark) Hilde Krahwinkel Sperling	(France) Simone Passermard Mathieu	3–6, 6–3 6–1
1937	Gstaad	(France) Simone Passermard Mathieu (2)	(France) Arlette Halff	6–2, 6–4
1938	Lucerne	(France) Arlette Halff	(Socialist Federal Republic of Yugoslavia) Hella Kovac	6–0, 7–5
1939	Zurich	(Poland) Jadwiga Jędrzejowska	(France) Arlette Halff	6–2, 4–6, 6–2
1940/1945	Not held (due to world war two)			
1946	Lucerne	(United States) Dodo Bundy	(Belgium) Nelly Adamson-Landry	divided title
1947	Lausanne	(South Africa) Sheila Piercey Summers	(United States) Doris Hart	6–3, 2–6, 6–3
1948	Championships were held at Gstaad, but the semi-finals and final abandoned because of rain			
1949	Gstaad	(South Africa) Sheila Piercey Summers (2)	(United Kingdom) Joan Curry	6–3, 6–3
1950	Lausanne	(United States) Louise Brough	(United Kingdom) Kay Tuckey	6–4, 6–2
1951	Lucerne	(Australia) Nancye Wynne Bolton	(United States) Barbara Scofield Davidson	3–6, 6–2, 6–1
1952	Gstaad	(United States) Dorothy Head	(West Germany) Erika Vollmer	6–2, 0–6, 6–2
1953	Lucerne	(United States) Barbara Scofield Davidson	(Spain) Maria Josefa de Riba	4–6, 6–4, 7–5
1954	Gstaad	(Switzerland) Violette Alvensleben-Rigollet	(United Kingdom) Pat Ward	6–1, 6–3
1955	Gstaad	(South Africa) Hazel Redick-Smith	(Switzerland) Ruth Nathan Kaufmann	1–6, 6–1, 6–4
1956	Lugano	(United States) Beverly Baker Fleitz	(Australia) Jenny Staley Hoad	1–6, 6–3, 6–3
1957	Gstaad	(Bermuda) Heather Nicholls Brewer	(South Africa) Sandra Reynolds	2–6, 7–5, 6–4
1958	Gstaad	(Australia) Lorraine Coghlan	(Mexico) Yola Ramírez	3–6 6–2 6–0
1959	Lugano	(United Kingdom) Christine Truman	(Mexico) Yola Ramírez	8–6, 6–1
1960	Gstaad	(Brazil) Maria Bueno	(South Africa) Sandra Reynolds	6–2, 6–3
1961	Gstaad	(South Africa) Sandra Reynolds	(Mexico) Yola Ramírez	7–5, 6–3
1962	Lugano	(Australia) Margaret Smith	(Australia) Lesley Turner	6–2, 6–1
1963	Gstaad	(Australia) Robyn Ebbern	(Australia) Lesley Turner	6–3, 6–4
1964	Lausanne	(Australia) Margaret Smith (2)	(Australia) Jan Lehane	2–6, 8–6, 6–2
1965	Lugano	(Argentina) Norma Baylon	(West Germany) Edda Buding	1-1 sets, 5–5. rain stopped play
1966	Gstaad	(West Germany) Helga Schultze	(Austria) Sonja Pachta	5–7, 7–5, 6–3
1967	Gstaad	(South Africa) Annette Van Zyl	(Australia) Jan Lehane O'Neill	6–1, 3–6, 6–3
Open era
For the open era event see WTA Swiss Open

== See also ==
- Category:National and multi-national tennis tournaments

== Sources ==
- Condon, Robert J. (1990). The Fifty Finest Athletes of the 20th Century: A Worldwide Reference. Jefferson, North Carolina, USA,: McFarland & Company. ISBN 978-0-89950-374-5.
- Paret, Jahial Parmly; Maddren, William Harvey (1904). Lawn tennis, its past, present, and future. New York, London: Macmillan.
- Sports Illustrated (1957) New York. United States.
- The Outing Magazine. (1899) Boston, United States: Outing Publishing Company.
- Times, The New York (24 July 1967). The New York Times. The New York Times Company.
- Wechsler, Bob (2008). Day by Day in Jewish Sports History. New York: KTAV Publishing House, Inc. ISBN 978-1-60280-013-7.
- Writers, Staff. "1877 to 2012 Finals Results". Steve G Tennis. stevegtennis.com.
