= Mikhail Sumarokov-Elston =

Russian tennis player

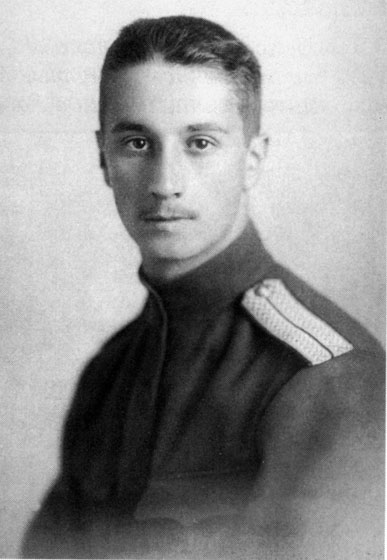
- Mikhail Sumarokov-Elston in 1914, during WWI
- Full name: Mikhail Nikolayevich Sumarokov-Elston
- Country (sports): Russia
- Born: 1893–1894^{[a]} Yalta, Russian Empire
- Died: 3 July 1970 London, England
- Turned pro: 1906 (amateur tour); 1936 (pro tour)
- Plays: right-handed (- 1905) left-handed (1905 -)

Singles
- Career titles: 39
- WHCC: 2R (1913)
- Olympic Games: 4R (1912)

Doubles

Other doubles tournaments
- WHCC: 1R (1913)
- Olympic Games: QF (1912)

Count Mikhail Nikolayevich Sumarokov-Elston (Russian: Михаил Николаевич Сумароков-Эльстон, IPA: [mʲɪxɐˈil nʲɪkɐˈlajɪvʲɪtɕ sʊmɐˈrokəf ˈɛlʲstən]; French: Michel de Soumarokoff-Elston; 1893 or 1894^{[a]} – 3 July 1970) was a Russian tennis player. He competed in two events at the 1912 Summer Olympics. Apart from his supremacy in the Russian national championships he was a Maltese champion and various French Riviera titleholder.

== Early life and family ==
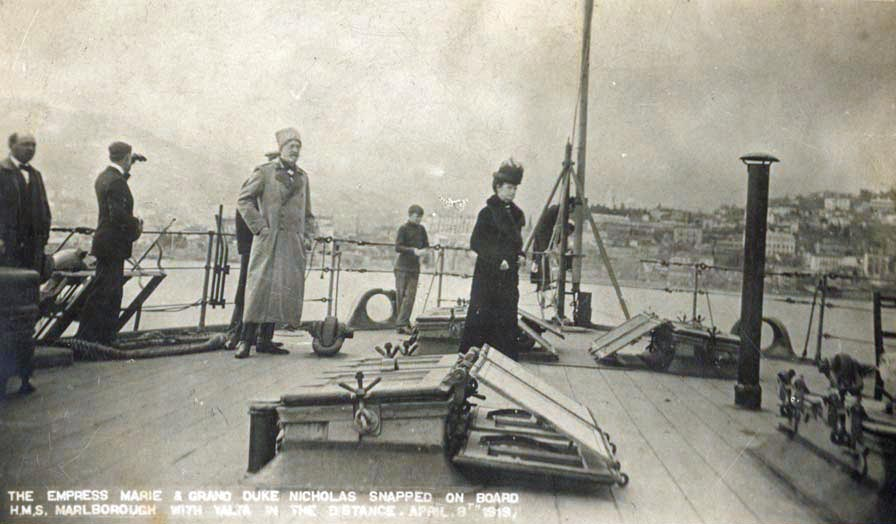
The Sumarokovs along with the Russian imperial family (latter pictured) leaving Crimea

Mikhail Sumarokov-Elston was born in 1893^{[a]} to Count Nicholai Felixovich Sumarokov-Elston reserve Lieutenant of the Cavalry Regiment and Countess Sofia Mikhaylovna Koskul. He was the great-great-great-great-grandson of poet Alexander Sumarokov and the great-great-grandson of Field Marshal Mikhail Kutuzov.^{[b]} He was the nephew of tennis player Count Pavel Sumarokov-Elston, who was his first coach and doubles partner, grandson of Count-General Felix Sumarokov-Elston, Governor of Kuban Oblast, and cousin of the infamous Prince Felix Yussupov, who later became known as one of the collaborators who conspired to kill Grigori Rasputin, cult leader and mentor of Empress consort of Russia Alexandra. Felix provided his own palace for the murder spot and also shot Rasputin once before murdering him with the help of his accomplices. Mikhail had a sister Elena and a brother Nicholas. At the age of twelve he had surgery on his right hand, which as a result was rendered unsuitable for tennis and he later switched to left-hand play. First he moved to Dresden and was trained by Kurt Bergmann and George K. Logie. In 1906 he entered the second-class tournament of the Bad Homburg Championships, where he defeated Jack Hillyard amongst many to claim his first title. With this he set a record of being the youngest winner ever at the time in the history of the tournament. In 1908 his father and brother died within two weeks of each other. He moved back to his homeland and graduated first at the Annenschule then at the Law Faculty of the St. Petersburg University.

In his diary, Tsar Nicholas II wrote:

"Today, Count Sumarokov, a young student, took part in the tennis - he is the best player in Russia. He can really teach one something. He also had tea with the officers."

He volunteered for the Russian Red Cross motorized ambulance unit at the outbreak of World War I, and was assigned to the Black Sea Fleet. His mother died on 3 April 1915. He was invalided out of the military service on 26 November 1916 and travelled home to St Petersburg. He was arrested for a couple of days by the Bolsheviks, but released because of disagreement among the people who detained him. The family permanently emigrated from Russia in the midst of the Russian Revolution, which emerged from the social fallback of the World War. First they fled to Koreiz where they were joined by fugitive Felix Yussupov who had been freed from his house arrest due to his involvement in the Rasputin murder. They agreed to join the White Army, but General Anton Denikin refused the request because the princes had ties to the Imperial dynasty.

They sailed to Malta on 13 April 1919 aboard the British battleship HMS Marlborough, which also transported several other Russian nobility exiles, including Empress Maria Feodorovna. From there they moved to Rome. In 1920 he further moved to Nice, where he lived for 17 more years.

== Tennis career ==
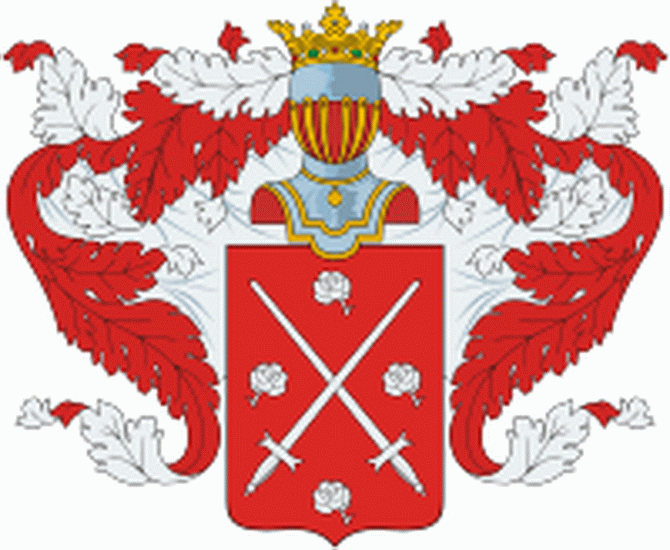
Sumarokov family coat of arms

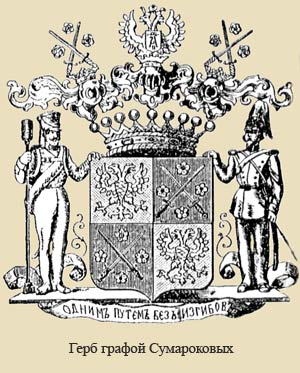
Count Sumarokov coat of arms

Mikhail Sumarokov-Elston was an eight-time national tennis champion, and also a two-time national indoors champion. He was successful in singles five consecutive times between 1910 and 1914, twice more in mixed doubles and also a doubles champion. He is still the youngest All-Russia champion to date with his 14 years of age at the time of his first triumph. He won his first indoor trophy in 1911 in St. Petersburg. At international level his first main tournament was the 1905 Bad Homburg Cup (of which he won the second-class edition) but lost in the second round to Irving Wright. The next year at the Wiesbaden Championships, where he – still an adolescent – was forced to withdraw from the second round after beating Herr von Parpart in the kick-off round. He played in several other tournaments throughout Germany, France and Switzerland before returning to Russia. There he won city tournaments in Moscow and St. Petersburg. Altogether he was crowned two-time St Petersburg champion in 1912 and 1914 and two-time Moscow champion in 1910 counting the singles and doubles.

Only a week after his first St Petersburg title Sumarokov traveled to Sweden to participate in the 1912 Summer Olympics with veteran player Aleksandr Alenitsyn. That tournament was also his only preparation for the games as he had to pass his high school diploma exams prior. The Olympic draw suffered a setback on expected entries of well-known players due to scheduling conflicts with the 1912 Wimbledon Championships. Even Alenitsyn withdrew from the singles outdoor event before its start. The first match against the Swedish champion Carl Setterwall saw an easy two set lead for Sumarokov the third was taken by Sweden after a twenty-game tie and the fourth last set was secured by Russia. In the next round 1912 French Championships finalist Oscar Kreuzer waited for his opponent. The match, which was witnessed by Grand Duchess Maria Pavlovna had a back-and-forth fight so fierce that Sumarokov tore the strings of his racquet and had to change it but that couldn't save him from losing to the German in four sets. He found consolation in the doubles tournament where he and Alenitsyn reached the quarterfinals.

The first Russian Championships open for foreign player registration were held for the first time in 1912. Among the non-Russian entrants were Ludwig von Salm-Hoogstraeten, Harold Kitson and Einer Ulrich. The first of these big tests came in the semifinals against Count Salm. The Austrian lost in straight sets only showing resistance in the second. The final match should have been a showdown between Kitson and Sumarokov but lasted short. After Sumarokov took the first set 6-3 Kitson got frustrated, complained to the chair umpire, grabbed his towel and left the court citing a right hand injury, which resulted in a walkover home victory. He became the undisputed champion after winning the doubles and mixed doubles as well with Count Salm and Ekaterina Hirschfeld respectively.

1913 started the same way as the year before: Sumarokov had to pass his University exams so he had few chances to practise before setting out to Paris for the World Hard Court Championships. There he advanced through the first round beating E Chelli. In the second round he was drawn to face young French prodigy and reigning Olympic champion André Gobert. It was a quick defeat as Sumarokov couldn't adapt to the fast-paced net-volley game of Gobert. He was also eliminated from the doubles contest in the very first round mostly due to his partner Paul Aymé's leg injury, which he suffered the previous night and kept them handicapped the whole match. Oddly it is thanks to these early exits that he was eligible for the consolation tournament, which was organized for the losers of the first two rounds. There he played his first match against one-half of his recent doubles opponents William le Maire de Warzée d'Hermalle (who had a 6-1 head-to-head record against fellow Belgian Champion Paul de Borman at the time.) This proved to be a tough warm-up for the later matches and it went two sets six-all before Sumarokov broke through. His former doubles partner Paul Aymé resigned from the quarterfinal for unknown reasons and gave him a walkover. In the semifinal came a pleasant surprise as the defending consolation title-holder Felix Pipes lost to him in two fast sets. The final was a rematch from the Russian Championships with Ludwig von Salm-Hoogstraeten. The day was struck with extreme heat so intense that it was dangerous to health. After a four set deuce the two finalists agreed to leave the decision to the drawing of lots and finish the match. The luck favored Salm and therefore he was announced the winner. The Cup was awarded to him but as soon as the chairman of the International Lawn Tennis Federation Henry Wallet realized that the winner's name was traditionally engraved onto the cup he reversed his decision and divided the prizes.

Two weeks later Sumarokov was scheduled to retain his title at the second annual Russian International Championships. It had a star-loaded 136-competitor field with Frenchmen Maurice Germot, Max Decugis and British Arthur Lowe and Charles P. Dixon present. In the first semifinal Sumarokov encountered Germot and overcame him in three straight sets while in the other all-English semifinal Dixon triumphed over Lowe. The final showed that the Russian player could stand the ground against world top ten challengers as well. From a two-one set disadvantage he closed the match with a two love-sets and kept his title after a 2 hours 54 minute battle. He then lost to Dixon in the first round of the doubles but beat him again for the mixed doubles title.

Although Sumarokov never played in the Davis Cup he represented Russia in the international matches against Great Britain and France in the last two consecutive years preceding the First World War. First in 1913 against the England team of Roderick McNair, Albert Prebble, Arthur Lowe and Charles P. Dixon. The two tennis federations agreed in a 12-match tie with 8 singles and 4 doubles rubbers. Sumarokov was still exhausted from his recent Russian Championships final with Dixon and thus lost easily to Lowe and decided to step back from further participation and had to be replaced with inexperienced players. As a consequence the Russian team lost. This marked the first time that an official national tennis team was formed.

In the 1914 Russian Championships he became a five-time champion after defeating Heinrich Kleinschroth in a five-set final. Curiosity of the Russian-German meeting was that the Sarajevo regicide happened during the tournament (which later escalated into World War I) and Russia had sent an envoy to France to strengthen a possible alliance against the German Empire. Just two weeks later the first Russia-France team match was held. It was agreed to follow Davis Cup rules and the French delegation was an all-Olympian squad of Maurice Germot, Max Decugis, Albert Canet, Édouard Mény de Marangue. The team challenge was interrupted in the middle with the outbreak of World War I and the visitors only managed to get onto the last train home before Germany declared war on the Russian Empire on 19 July.

After the war he won the Malta Championships in 1919. The following year he clinched his first French title at the South of France Championships beating home favorite Alain Gerbault in a five-set final. The next year in Nice he was eliminated in the semifinal stage by Gordon Lowe. However he did defend his South of France title by beating Mino Balbi Di Robecco by dropping only two games. This was the first time he partnered Suzanne Lenglen for the mixed contest, which they won. In 1922 he was triumphant in Nice] as well, grabbing the singles trophy easily against Maurice Férrier. He took the doubles as well with Gerbault. He defended the South of France title for the second time against legendary Henri Cochet having beaten Charles Aeschlimann on his way to the final. At the same tournament he also repeated his previous year's feat with Lenglen by overcoming Lord Rocksavage and Elizabeth Ryan in the mixed final. He almost celebrated his first triple crown trophy with his teammate Gerbault but fell short in the doubles final against Rocksavage-Cochet. It is worth noting that this was the first time Sumarokov played on grass courts. In 1923 the team of Sumarokov-Lenglen dropped the same title to Randolph Lycett and Elizabeth Ryan. In 1931 at the Parc Imperial L.T.C. de Nice George Lyttleton-Rogers and his partner Rosie Berthet had an overwhelming victory over Sumarokov and Miss J Franks in the mixed final. The same year he was also mixed doubles runner-up in two other tournaments at the New Court Lawn Tennis Club and Cannes Lawn Tennis Club, losing both times. He reached the semifinals of the doubles and mixed in the Nice Tennis Club tournament. He won the Russian Émigré Tennis Championships three consecutive times beginning from 1935. He turned professional in 1936.

=== Playing style and equipment ===
He played left-handed with a heavy topspin, after he had to give up his right-handed style due to a childhood injury. His left-hand serve was so rare that he gave exhibition matches in Germany to Grand Duke Alexei Alexandrovich of Russia and Grand Duke George Mikhailovich of Russia. According to his contemporary coach Alexandr Stakhovich he was a baseline player with a formidable backhand. Sumarokov played with Doherty, Slazenger and Driva racquets. In 1911 he changed to Maxim racquets. The manufacturer even released an autographed series of racquets with "Sumarokov" written on it with gold embossed letters. Later he adjusted his game to putting a curl to the ball as well as hitting it hard and with a high trajectory as described by Henri Cochet in his book Tennis. Sumarokov is thought to be the first to use this method, which became popular decades later, being used by many players most notably Jimmy Connors and Guillermo Vilas.

== Personal life ==
As this name itself indicates ("Felix", meaning "happy, fertile"), Elston's grandfather was the illegitimate son of a high-ranking official. Felix received the surname "Elston", which was borne by his English wet nurse, by a special imperial decree. There was no consensus in secular society about exactly who his parents were.

The prevailing view was that Elston was the Empress's nephew and, therefore, Alexander II's cousin. Prince Felix Yusupov wrote about his grandfather's origins in his memoirs the following:

They say his father was Prussian King Friedrich Wilhelm IV and his mother was lady-in-waiting to Empress Alexandra Feodorovna, who took the lady with her when she went to visit her brother. The king fell in love with the girl and even wanted to marry her, but rumours claimed that her surname came from "elle s’etonne", which was said to express the feelings of the young mother. It was believed that the mother of Elston was Countess Ekaterina Tiesenhausen, who was brought to Russia from Europe in 1825 and raised in her mother's family, by Elizaveta Khitrovo (daughter of Field Marshal Mikhail Kutuzov).

From a chronological point of view, it seems preferable to consider that Elston's parents were not married. Baron Hügel, later a famous traveller, and the Hungarian countess Forgach (née Andrássy), a relative of the Hungarian prime minister, were the parents of Elston. In this case, Hügel was the brother of religious thinker Friedrich von Hügel.

Mikhail Sumarokov-Elston was well educated and by the age of thirteen he already spoke five languages. Apart from playing tennis he was an amateur chess player as well. He was in a great relationship with Tsar Nicholas II of Russia and played tennis with him a couple of times. In 1913 he was elected an honorary member of the Stade Français in Paris. He married Natalia Nikolaevna Bellik in 1932. The next year she gave birth to their daughter Sofia. They moved to London in 1937, where he led the Anglo-Russian Sports Club in Chiswick. He died in the University College Hospital in 1970 and was buried in the Chiswick New Cemetery. In 2002 he was inducted to the Russian Tennis Hall of Fame for his sport merits.

== Notes ==
- ^{a} Sources differ regarding his birth date. However his grave shows 21 November [O.S. 9 November] 1893.
- ^{b} According to the newest researches the house of Kutuzov is not related to the House of Sumarokov by blood but only by adoption.

== Ancestry ==
Ancestors of Mikhail Sumarokov-Elston

16. Count Johann Aloys Josef Hügel, later 1st Freiherr von Hügel
8. Karl Alexander Anselm Freiherr von Hügel
17. Countess Anna von Holthof
4. Count Felix Sumarokov-Elston
18. István Graf Andrássy de Csíkszentkirály et Krasznahorka
9. countess Jozefa Gräfin Andrássy de Csíkszentkirály et Krasznahorka
19. Mária Gräfin Festetics de Tolna
2. Count Nikolay Sumarokov-Elston
20. Pavel Ivanovich Sumarokov
10. Count Sergey Pavlovich Sumarokov
21. Princess Maria Vassilevna Galitzina
5. Countess Elena Sergeievna Sumarokova
22. Marquis Panos Maruzzi
11. Marchioness Aleksandra Pavlovna Maruzzi
23. Zoë Ghika
1. Count Mikhail Sumarokov-Elston
6. Michael Franzowitsch von Koskull
3. Sofia von Koskull
28. Prince Alexander Mikhailovich Obolensky
14. Prince Peter Alexandrovich Obolensky
29. Anna Mikhailovna Miloslawkya
7. Warwara Petrovna Schtscherbatowa
30. Prince Andrei Ivanovich Viazemsky
15. Princess Ekaterina Andreievna Viasemsky
31. Eugenia Kine

== Sources ==
- Fomenko, Boris (2004a). "1-3". The knight of the tennis racket (PDF) (in Russian). Moscow, Russia: NDM-Media. ISBN 1-5532-1110-3.
- Fomenko, Boris (2004b). "3-6". The knight of the tennis racket (PDF) (in Russian). Moscow, Russia: NDM-Media. ISBN 1-5532-1110-3.
- Fomenko, Boris (2004c). "Part II". The knight of the tennis racket (PDF) (in Russian). Moscow, Russia: NDM-Media. ISBN 1-5532-1110-3.
