= Engadine Championships =

Engadine Championships Championnats d'Engadine

Defunct tennis tournament
- Tour: ILTF Circuit (1913-38)
- Founded: 1900; 125 years ago
- Abolished: 1939; 86 years ago
- Location: Saint Moritz, Switzerland
- Venue: The Kulm Hotel
- Surface: Clay (outdoors)

The Engadine Championships or Championnats d'Engadine was a men's and women's open international clay court tennis tournament founded in 1900 and first staged at The Kulm Hotel, Saint Moritz, Switzerland. The championships was discontinued in 1939.

== History ==
The Engadine Championships were staged at Saint Moritz, Switzerland in 1900. The championships were usually held in the August each year. The tournament continued to be staged through till 1938 when they were discontinued just before the start of World War II. The event was played exclusively at the Kulm Hotel St. Moritz.
