= Victor Voss =

German count and tennis player

Viktor Voß
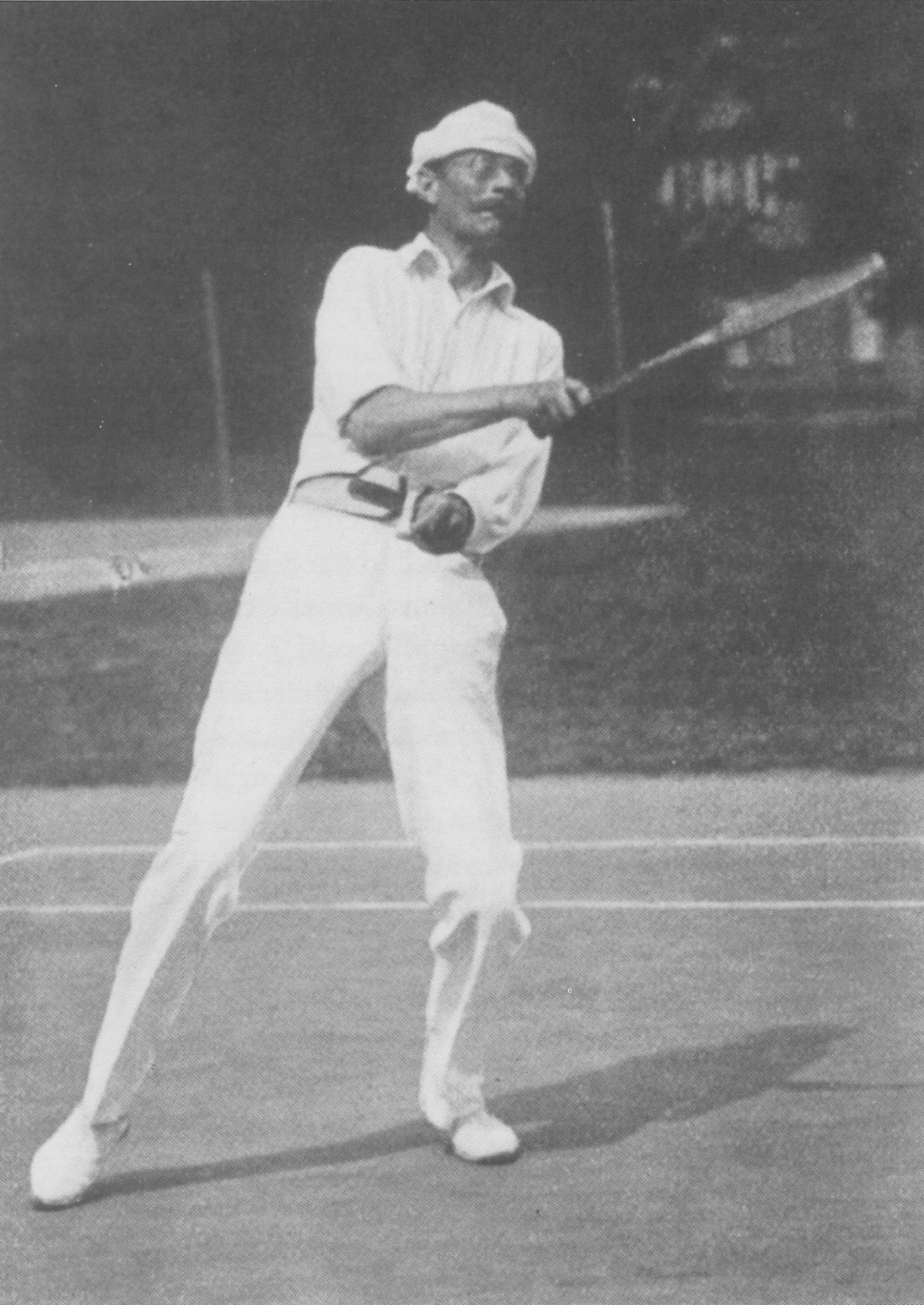
- Full name: Viktor Eugen Felix Graf Voß-Schönau
- Country (sports): (Germany) German Empire
- Born: 31 March 1868; Schorssow, North German Confederation
- Died: 9 August 1936 (aged 68); Waren, Third Reich
- Turned pro: 1893 (amateur tour)
- Retired: 1900

Singles
- Career record: 56–22 (71.7%)
- Career titles: 7

Count Victor Eugen Felix Voß-Schönau (German pronunciation: [ˈviktɔʁ ˈvɔs]; 31 March 1868 – 9 August 1936) was a German count and tennis player in the late 19th century.

== Biography ==
Count Victor Voss was born on the family estate at Schorssow in today Northeastern Germany to the Hungarian countess Elise Szapáry. At the beginning of the 1890s, he learned to play tennis with the help of an American coach, winning the German Championships three consecutive seasons (1894 - 1896), which were restricted to German and Austrian citizens at the time. In 1896, he was finalist at the Baden-Baden tournament which he lost to Reginald Doherty.

In 1897 he hired a coach named Thomas Burke (father of Albert Burke) and began to play in tournaments at the Riviera. He reached the 1897 final at Nice and 1898 final at Monte Carlo, but respectively lost to Reginald and his brother Laurence Doherty.

In 1899, Voss took part in tournament in the United Kingdom. At the Irish Open, he lost his second round match to Frank Riseley in five sets. At Chiswick Park he lost to George Greville. He reached the final at Nice once again in this year, but lost to Laurence Doherty in three straight sets never winning a one game.

Voss usually played at the tennis facilities at Heiligendamm, where he frequently met with Russian Duchess Anastasia Mikhailovna and countess Clara von der Schulenburg. He used to wrap a wet towel around his forehead while playing, as he said it would prevent his glasses from fogging.

A. Wallis Myers wrote about Voss: "He has a good forehand ground stroke and volleys well, but his service, though hard, is easy to take, he smashes only moderately, and his ground stroke is poor."

After losing to George Hillyard in the semifinals of the 1900 German Championships, Voss retired from playing tennis tournaments. He would focus on his other two other hobbies: auto racing and clay pigeon shooting. In 1911, he married the divorced ItalianFrancesca Ricci at New York. They had two children, Paula and Hans-Alexander. In 1928, he married Countess Clara von der Schulenburg at Berlin-Grunewald. He died a reclusive in his house at Waren in 1936.
