= Les Avants Championship =

Les Avants Championship Championnat des Avants

Defunct tennis tournament
- Tour: ILTF Circuit (1913-38)
- Founded: 1902; 123 years ago
- Abolished: 1938; 87 years ago
- Location: Les Avants, Montreux, Switzerland
- Venue: Tennis Club des Avants
- Surface: Clay (outdoors)

The Les Avants Championship or Championnat des Avants also known as the Les Avants International was a men's and women's open international clay court tennis tournament staged at the Tennis Club des Avants, Les Avants, Montreux, Switzerland from 1902 until 1938.

== History ==
The Championship of Les Evants was established in September 1902 and was held at the Tennis Club des Avants, Les Avants, Montreux, Switzerland. The tournament was usually held in August sometimes in September. In 1904 the edition was held jointly as the Swiss International Championships. The championship continued to be held through til 1938 when it was discontinued due to World War II. The tennis club is still operating today.
