= Axel Petersen (athlete) =

Danish athlete (1880–1962)

Axel Johannes Petersen (14 November 1880 – 23 May 1962) was a Danish athlete. He competed at the 1908 Summer Olympics in London. In the 100 metres, Petersen took second place in his first round heat with a time of 11.5 seconds. He did not advance to the semifinals.

== Sources ==
- Cook, Theodore Andrea (1908). The Fourth Olympiad, Being the Official Report. London: British Olympic Association.
- De Wael, Herman (2001). "Athletics 1908". Herman's Full Olympians. Archived from the original on 27 September 2006.
- Wudarski, Pawel (1999). "Wyniki Igrzysk Olimpijskich" (in Polish). Archived from the original on 14 June 2006.
