= Clara von der Schulenburg =

German tennis player

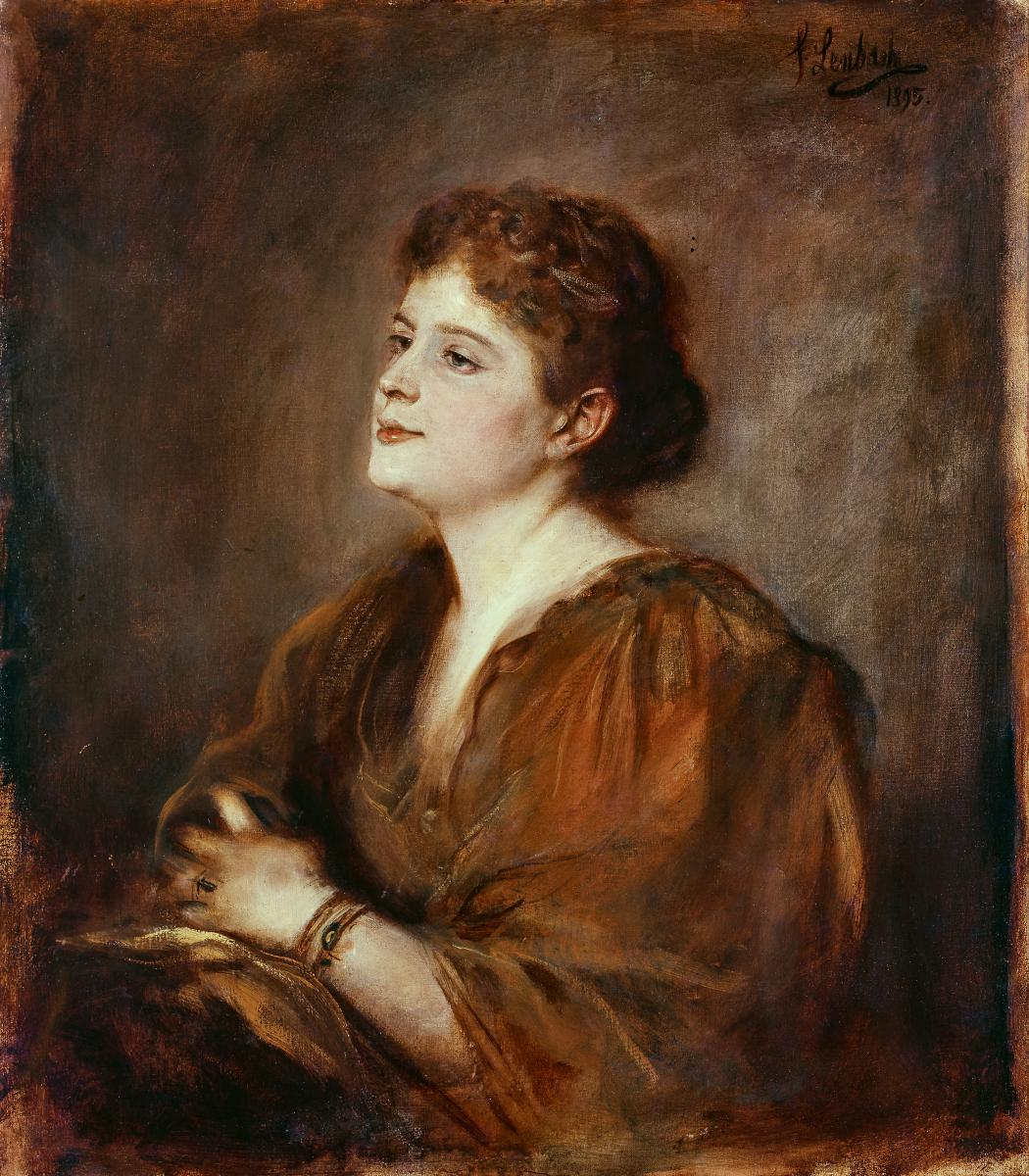
- Countess Clara von der Schulenburg, painted by Franz von Lenbach, 1895
- Country (sports): Germany
- Born: 1874; Düsseldorf, German Empire
- Died: 10 February 1951; Berlin, West Germany

Singles

Grand Slam singles results
- Wimbledon: 2R (1908)

Countess Clara von der Schulenburg (1874 – 10 February 1951), was a female German tennis player who was active in the final years of the 19th century and the early 20th century. During that period she was considered the best German female player.

== Biography ==
Von der Schulenburg played for the Rot-Weiss Tennis Club in Berlin since 1897. She won the singles title at the International Championships of Berlin, also known as the 'Pfingstturnier', on nine occasions (1896, 1897, 1898, 1903, 1904, 1905, 1909, 1910 and 1920). She was a runner-up at the 1899 International German Championships, held that year in Bad Homburg vor der Höhe, losing the final in straight sets to three-time Wimbledon champion Charlotte Cooper. (Note: She played under the pseudonym 'Frau Hartwig'.)

She competed in the singles event at the 1908 Wimbledon Championships and reached the second round in which she was defeated in three sets by Dora Boothby. Von der Schulenburg was considered the best German female player (Note: According to tennis player and author A. Wallis Myers her level was comparable to the eleventh or twelfth best English female player.) until the last years before World War I when she was superseded by Dora Köring and Mieken Rieck and thereafter also by Ilse Friedleben and Nelly Neppach. She, however, remained competitive in the doubles and mixed doubles events until around the mid-1920s.

She was a frequent participant at the various French Riviera tournaments, played during the winter months and visited by many European, particularly British, players. Von der Schulenburg first took part in 1897 at the tournaments in Nice and Monte Carlo. In 1900, 1902, 1904 and 1909 she won the singles title at the South of France Championships in Nice and was runner-up in 1901, 1903 and 1905.

Von der Schulenburg was a baseline player with firm, well-placed groundstrokes, mainly of the forehand side, who served underhand.

She married tennis player Count Victor Voss in 1928 in Berlin-Grunewald and had previously been married to Count Hartwig von der Schulenberg-Angern, a Prussian councillor.
