= Championships of Pays-d'Enhaut =

Tennis tournament in Vaud, Switzerland

Championships of Pays-d'Enhaut Championnats des Pays d'Enhaut

Defunct tennis tournament
- Tour: ILTF Circuit (1913–1938)
- Founded: 1896; 129 years ago
- Abolished: 1938; 87 years ago
- Location: Château-d'Œx, Switzerland
- Venue: Tennis Club de Château-d'Oex (1896–1903); Hôtels Berthod (1904–1938)
- Surface: Clay (outdoors)

The Championships of Pays-d'Enhaut or Championnats des Pays d'Enhaut also called the Up Country Championships was a men's and women's open international clay court tennis tournament first staged at the Tennis Club de Château-d'Oex, Château-d'Œx, Switzerland, from 1896 until 1938.

== History ==
The Championships of the Pays-d'Enhaut was established in September 1896 and was first played at the Tennis Club de Château-d'Oex, Château-d'Œx, Switzerland and continued there until 1903. In 1904 following the building of the new grand Hôtels Berthod and its clay tennis courts the event was moved there until it was discontinued in 1939 due to the outbreak of World War II.

== Sources ==
- All about Switzerland (1933). Zurich: Schweizerische Bundesbahnen.
- Bazzanella, Sylvie (19 March 2011). "Hôtels Berthod". www.notrehistoire.ch (in French). Foundation for the Safeguarding of the Audiovisual Heritage of Radio Télévision Suisse (FONSART).
- Myers, Arthur Wallis (1903). Lawn Tennis at Home and Abroad. London: G. Newnes Limited.
