= Elsie Lane =

English tennis player

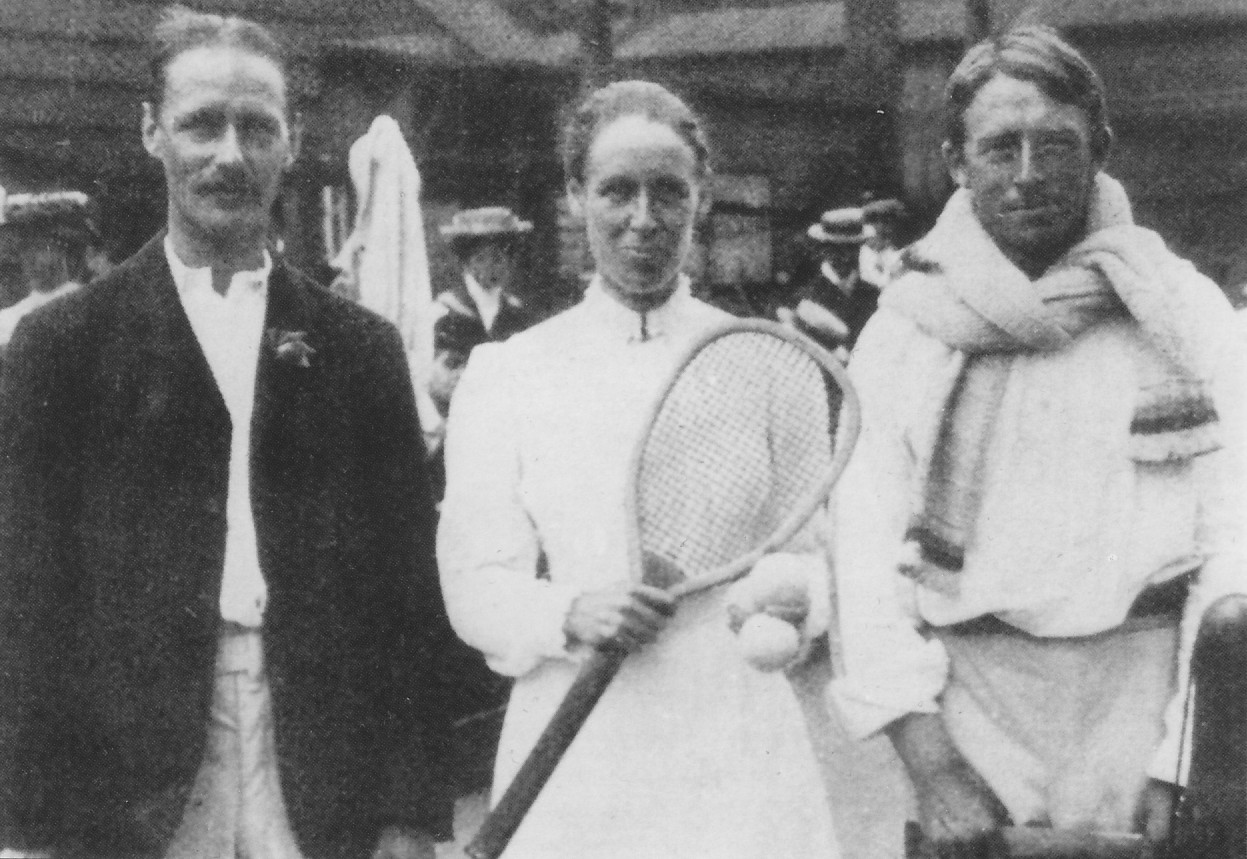
- Lane (center) in 1904
- Country (sports): United Kingdom
- Died: 10 August 1948 Hove, England

Elsie Lane was an English tennis player active during the last decade of the 19th century and the first decade of the 20th century.

She was the daughter of Wilmot Lane, a barrister-at-law who had been a civil servant in India. She played frequently at the German Ladies Championships. In 1898 the tournament was played in Bad Homburg and she won the singles title against compatriot Toupie Lowther after a "brilliant, albeit erratic, Toupée (sic) Lowther who had abandoned her usual play in favour of an uninspired game from base line in two straight sets." In 1904 she won her second German Championships title, this time played in Hamburg at the Eisbahn-Verein auf der Uhlenhorst, after defeating Lucie Bergmann in the final. The following year, 1905, she won the title for the third time after a straight sets win in the final against Käthe Krug.

In September 1897 she was a runner-up in the Sussex Challenge Cup, losing in straight sets in the final to Charlotte Cooper Sterry. In July 1906 she won the mixed doubles title at the Marienbad Championship with Anthony Wilding.

She was the sister of tennis player Hilda Lane.

== Career finals ==
=== Singles, titles (3) ===
Year	Championship	Opponent in Final	Score in Final
1898	German Championships	(United Kingdom) Toupie Lowther	7–5, 7–5
1904	German Championships	(German Empire) Lucie Bergmann	6–3, 6–0
1905	German Championships	(German Empire) Käthe Krug	6–0, 6–1
