= 1960 U.S. National Championships – Men's singles =

Men's singles
- 1960 U.S. National Championships

Final
- Champion: (Australia) Neale Fraser
- Runner-up: (Australia) Rod Laver
- Score: 6–4, 6–4, 10–8

Details
- Draw: 128
- Seeds: 8

Events
Singles	men	women
Doubles	men	women
- U.S. National Championships

Neale Fraser defeated Rod Laver 6–4, 6–4, 10–8 in the final to win the men's singles tennis title at the 1960 U.S. National Championships.

== Seeds ==
The seeded players are listed below. Neale Fraser is the champion; others show the round in which they were eliminated.

1. (Australia) Neale Fraser (champion)
2. (Australia) Rod Laver (finalist)
3. (United States) Barry MacKay (fourth round)
4. (United States) Cliff Buchholz (first round)
5. (United States) Tut Bartzen (first round)
6. (Australia) Roy Emerson (third round)
7. (United States) Ron Holmberg (fourth round)
8. (United Kingdom) Bobby Wilson (quarterfinals)

== Draw ==
=== Key ===
- Q = Qualifier
- WC = Wild card
- LL = Lucky loser
- r = Retired

=== Final eight ===
Quarterfinals
(United States) Dennis Ralston	1	6	6	6
(Australia) Bob Mark	6	3	3	2
(United States) Chuck McKinley	2	4	2
1	(Australia) Neale Fraser	6	6	6
(United States) Ham Richardson	6	3	4	4
(United States) Butch Buchholz	3	6	6	6
8	(United Kingdom) Bobby Wilson	7	1	3
2	(Australia) Rod Laver	9	6	6

Semifinals
(United States) Dennis Ralston	9	3	2
1	(Australia) Neale Fraser	11	6	6
(United States) Butch Buchholz	6	7	4	2	5
2	(Australia) Rod Laver	4	5	6	6	7

Final
1	(Australia) Neale Fraser	6	6	10
2	(Australia) Rod Laver	4	4	8

=== Earlier rounds ===
==== Section 1 ====
First round
(South Africa) Maloney	4	6	6	5
(Australia) Hewitt	6	8	4	7
(United States) Lenoir	3	6	5	3
(United States) Morris	6	4	7	6
(Australia) Sharpe	3	2	6
(United States) Ralston	6	6	8
(Colombia) Castillo	1	4	0
(United States) Evans	6	6	6
(United States) Clark	13	1	6
(United States) Froehling	15	6	8
(United States) Sack	6	3	2	7
(United States) Dailey	2	6	6	9
(United States) Buck	4	2	3
(South Africa) Spengler	6	6	6
(Australia) Woodcock	1	3	6	4
7	(United States) Holmberg	6	6	2	6

Second round
(Australia) Hewitt	8	12	3	6
(United States) Morris	6	10	6	4
(United States) Ralston	6	6	6
(United States) Evans	0	1	3
(United States) Froehling	4	6	7	6
(United States) Dailey	6	1	5	4
(South Africa) Spengler	1	3	1
7	(United States) Holmberg	6	6	6

Third round
(Australia) Hewitt	6	1	2	4
(United States) Ralston	3	6	6	6
(United States) Froehling	4	3	2
7	(United States) Holmberg	6	6	6

Fourth round
(United States) Ralston	6	9	6
7	(United States) Holmberg	4	7	2

==== Section 2 ====
First round
(United Kingdom) Mellersh	3	1	4
(United States) Nagler	6	6	6
(United States) Freedhoff	2	1	1
(United States) Graebner	6	6	6
(Colombia) Salas	1	0	3
(United States) Bond	6	6	6
(Brazil) Bueno-Nete	3	0	0
(Australia) Mark	6	6	6
(United States) Sledge	1	7	5
(Mexico) Osuna	6	9	7
(United States) Burns	1	3	3
(Canada) Godbout	6	6	6
(United States) Hetherington	2	6	6	5	3
(United States) White	6	2	1	7	6
(United States) Douglas	6	2	4
3	(United States) MacKay	8	6	6

Second round
(United States) Nagler	7	6	6
(United States) Graebner	5	3	2
(United States) Bond	6	4	3
(Australia) Mark	8	6	6
(Mexico) Osuna	6	6	6
(Canada) Godbout	2	2	3
(United States) White	4	2	4
3	(United States) MacKay'	6	6	6

Third round
(United States) Nagler	3	3	9	7	8
(Australia) Mark	6	6	7	5	10
(Mexico) Osuna	3	4	4
3	(United States) MacKay	6	6	6

Fourth round
(Australia) Mark	7	6	6	0	6
3	(United States) MacKay	5	3	8	6	4

==== Section 3 ====
First round
(India) Kumar	1	3	3
(United States) Riessen	6	6	6
(United States) Stoesser	6	1	3
(United States) McKinley	8	6	6
(Argentina) Van Kerckhoven	0	5	7	6	6
(United Kingdom) Ambrose	6	7	5	4	8
(Australia) Mulligan	8	6	4	6	1
(Mexico) Reyes	10	4	6	0	6
(United States) Brownlow	7	6	4
(United States) Oliver	9	8	6
(United States) Davis	1	4	0
(United States) Seixas	6	6	6
(United States) Fisher	0	7	5	0
(United States) Senkowski	6	5	7	6
5	(United States) Bartzen	6	6	4	6	1
(United States) Crawford	1	8	6	2	6

Second round
(United States) Riessen	6	7	5	5
(United States) McKinley	1	9	7	7
(United Kingdom) Ambrose	1	4	3
(Mexico) Reyes	6	6	6
(United States) Oliver	4	5	4
(United States) Seixas	6	7	6
(United States) Senkowski	3	4	4
(United States) Crawford	6	6	6

Third round
(United States) McKinley	7	6	6
(Mexico) Reyes	5	4	4
(United States) Seixas	6	7	3	13	6
(United States) Crawford	4	5	6	15	2

Fourth round
(United States) McKinley	6	2	17	6
(United States) Seixas	4	6	15	4

==== Section 4 ====
First round
(United States) Cranis	4	8	3	3
(Australia) Russel	6	6	6	6
(United States) Richardson	4	6	1
(Mexico) Palafox	6	8	6
(Chile) Leon	0	0	1
(United States) Reed	6	6	6
(South Africa) Hammill	4	2	4
(United Kingdom) Sangster	6	6	6
(United States) Biggs	6	4	4	2
(United States) Buck	3	6	6	6
(Venezuela) Gambus	2	2	3
(United States) Moss	6	6	6
(United Kingdom) Hann	2	3	6	7
(United States) Henry	6	6	3	9
(United States) Raskind	0	1	1
1	(Australia) Fraser	6	6	6

Second round
(Australia) Russel	11	3	2
(Mexico) Palafox	13	6	6
(United States) Reed	4	4	4
(United Kingdom) Sangster	6	6	6
(United States) Buck	3	3	4
(United States) Moss	6	6	6
(United States) Henry	1	1	1
1	(Australia) Fraser	6	6	6

Third round
(Mexico) Palafox	4	3	3
(United Kingdom) Sangster	6	6	6
(United States) Moss	3	2	4
1	(Australia) Fraser	6	6	6

Fourth round
(United Kingdom) Sangster	2	1	4
1	(Australia) Fraser	6	6	6

==== Section 5 ====
First round
(United States) Earnhart	4	9	2	6	3
(New Zealand) Gerrard	6	7	6	3	6
(South Africa) Jennett	3	11	4	1
(Austria) Legenstein	6	9	6	6
(United States) Powless	1	3	6	2
(Canada) Bedard	6	6	4	6
(United States) Ralph	5	0	5
(Venezuela) Pimentel	7	6	7
(United States) Beck	4	5	3
(United States) Richardson	6	7	6
(United States) Karabasz	0	9	0	2
(United States) Scott	6	7	6	6
(United States) Green	4	6	4	4
(United States) Cranston	6	3	6	6
(United Kingdom) Tattersall	2	2	0
6	(Australia) Emerson	6	6	6

Second round
(New Zealand) Gerrard	9	3	6	9
(Austria) Legenstein	7	6	3	7
(Canada) Bedard	6	3	4	3
(Venezuela) Pimentel	4	6	6	6
(United States) Richardson	5	6	6	6
(United States) Scott	7	1	1	3
(United States) Cranston	2	1	4
6	(Australia) Emerson	6	6	6

Third round
(New Zealand) Gerrard	6	6	6
(Venezuela) Pimentel	2	2	4
(United States) Richardson	3	6	9	8
6	(Australia) Emerson	6	4	7	6

Fourth round
(New Zealand) Gerrard	1	10	2	6	0
(United States) Richardson	6	8	6	3	6

==== Section 6 ====
First round
(United States) Bowditch	4	6	4
(United States) Ashe	6	8	6
(Canada) Carpenter	6	2	4
(Ecuador) Zuleta	8	6	6
(United States) Howe	4	2	9	1
(Australia) Coghlan	6	6	7	6
(United States) Hettleman	3	8	4
(United Kingdom) Bennett	6	10	6
(South Africa) Heckler	6	7	4	6	5
(United States) McManus	3	9	6	2	7
(United States) Brown	4	4	6	4
(United Kingdom) Woolven	6	6	3	6
(United Kingdom) Booth	5	7	6	3
(United States) Junta	7	9	3	6
(Canada) Fontana	3	0	2
(United States) Buchholz	6	6	6

Second round
(United States) Ashe	4	2	2
(Ecuador) Zuleta	6	6	6
(Australia) Coghlan	6	6	6
(United Kingdom) Bennett	2	3	3
(United States) McManus	2	6	6	6
(United Kingdom) Woolven	6	4	3	2
(United States) Junta	1	4	0
(United States) Buchholz	6	6	6

Third round
(Ecuador) Zuleta	2	9	6	6	6
(Australia) Coghlan	6	11	2	4	2
(United States) McManus	1	2	5
(United States) Buchholz	6	6	7

Fourth round
(Ecuador) Zuleta	0	0	2
(United States) Buchholz	6	6	6

==== Section 7 ====
First round
(United States) Schwartz	2	6	6	4	0
(United States) Fox	6	4	3	6	6
4	(United States) Buchholz	6	2	0	6	2
(United States) Hoogs	1	6	6	4	6
(Canada) Swann	6	5	7	3
(United States) Lambert	3	7	9	6
(United States) Roberts	7	2	1	1
(United States) Palmer	5	6	6	6
(Colombia) Castillo	3	4	6	6
(United States) Pickett	6	6	3	8
(Mexico) Palafox	2	3	4
(United States) Crane	6	6	6
(United States) Kumar	0	2	1
(United States) Rubell	6	6	6
(United States) Vickery	3	2	4
8	(United Kingdom) Wilson	6	6	6

Second round
(United States) Fox	7	6	0	6
(United States) Hoogs	5	4	6	2
(United States) Lambert	6	6	6
(United States) Palmer	2	3	2
(United States) Pickett	6	4	3
(United States) Crane	8	6	6
(United States) Rubell	0	1	2
8	(United Kingdom) Wilson	6	6	6

Third round
(United States) Fox	6	6	8
(United States) Lambert	3	4	6
(United States) Crane	2	2	3
8	(United Kingdom) Wilson	6	6	6

Fourth round
(United States) Fox	5	1	2
8	(United Kingdom) Wilson	7	6	6

==== Section 8 ====
First round
(United States) Hedrick	2	4	8
(United States) Kamakana	6	6	10
(United States) Farrin	9	2	5	0
(United States) Lesch	7	6	7	6
(United States) Pasarell	6	3	4
(United States) Dell	8	6	6
(United States) Susman	6	3	1	5
(United States) Driscole	4	6	6	7
(France) Bergerat	6	1	1	6	2
(United States) Hernando	4	6	6	1	6
(United States) Siska	2	3	6	6
(United States) Franks	6	6	4	8
(United States) Keeton	0	2	0
(Ecuador) Olvera	6	6	6
(United States) Barker	2	5	2
2	(Australia) Laver	6	7	6

Second round
(United States) Kamakana	0	4	1
(United States) Lesch	6	6	6
(United States) Dell	4	6	2	6
(United States) Driscole	6	4	6	8
(United States) Hernando	4	3	8	1
(United States) Franks	6	6	6	6
(Ecuador) Olvera	0	2	4
2	(Australia) Laver	6	6	6

Third round
(United States) Lesch	7	6	9
(United States) Driscole	5	2	7
(United States) Franks	2	7	2	3
2	(Australia) Laver	6	5	6	6

Fourth round
(United States) Lesch	2	7	3	3
2	(Australia) Laver	6	5	6	6

Preceded by 1960 Wimbledon Championships – Men's singles	Grand Slam men's singles	Succeeded by 1961 Australian Championships – Men's singles
