= 1959 U.S. National Championships – Men's singles =

Men's singles
- 1959 U.S. National Championships

Final
- Champion: (Australia) Neale Fraser
- Runner-up: (United States) Alex Olmedo
- Score: 6–3, 5–7, 6–2, 6–4

Details
- Draw: 128
- Seeds: 8

Events
| Singles | men | women |
| Doubles | men | women |
- U.S. National Championships

Neale Fraser defeated Alex Olmedo 6–3, 5–7, 6–2, 6–4 in the final to win the men's singles tennis title at the 1959 U.S. National Championships.

== Seeds ==
The seeded players are listed below. Neale Fraser is the champion; others show the round in which they were eliminated.

1. (United States) Alex Olmedo (finalist)
2. (Australia) Neale Fraser (champion)
3. (United States) Barry MacKay (tennis) (quarterfinals)
4. (Australia) Rod Laver (quarterfinals)
5. (India) Ramanathan Krishnan (third round)
6. (Chile) Luis Ayala (quarterfinals)
7. (United States) Butch Buchholz (fourth round)
8. (Australia) Roy Emerson (quarterfinals)

== Draw ==
=== Key ===
- Q = Qualifier
- WC = Wild card
- LL = Lucky loser
- r = Retired

=== Final eight ===
Quarterfinals
(United States) Ron Holmberg | 6 | 7 | 6 | 6
4 | (Australia) Rod Laver | 8 | 5 | 0 | 3
8 | (Australia) Roy Emerson | 4 | 6 | 2 | 3
1 | (United States) Alex Olmedo | 6 | 3 | 6 | 6
(United States) Tut Bartzen | 6 | 6 | 6
3 | (United States) Barry MacKay | 3 | 4 | 4
6 | (Chile) Luis Ayala | 3 | 4 | 4
2 | (Australia) Neale Fraser | 6 | 6 | 6

Semifinals
(United States) Ron Holmberg | 13 | 4 | 6 | 1
1 | (United States) Alex Olmedo | 15 | 6 | 3 | 6
(United States) Tut Bartzen | 3 | 2 | 2
2 | (Australia) Neale Fraser | 6 | 6 | 6

Final
1 | (United States) Alex Olmedo | 3 | 7 | 2 | 4
2 | (Australia) Neale Fraser | 6 | 5 | 6 | 6

=== Earlier rounds ===
==== Section 1 ====
First round
(United States) Lesch | 3 | 6 | 3 | 6 | 2
(United States) Susman | 6 | 3 | 6 | 1 | 6
(United States) Ellis | 3 | 2 | 0
(United States) Holmberg | 6 | 6 | 6
(United States) Riessen | 6 | 0 | 1
(United States) Savitt | 8 | 6 | 6
(Mexico) Palafox | 6 | 6 | 4 | 4 | 4
(United States) Eisenberg | 2 | 3 | 6 | 6 | 6
(United States) Earnhart | 3 | 6 | 4 | 6 | 2
(United States) Van Rensselaer | 6 | 2 | 6 | 3 | 6
(United States) Crane | 2 | 3 | 1
(United States) Dell | 6 | 6 | 6
(United States) Karabasz | 3 | 1 | 6 | 4
(Australia) Fletcher | 6 | 6 | 2 | 6
(United States) Bowditch | 7 | 3 | 3
7 | (United States) Buchholz | 9 | 6 | 6

Second round
(United States) Susman | 3 | 1 | 0
(United States) Holmberg | 6 | 6 | 6
(United States) Savitt | 9 | 6 | 6
(United States) Eisenberg | 7 | 0 | 2
(United States) Van Rensselaer | 1 | 1 | 1
(United States) Dell | 6 | 6 | 6
(Australia) Fletcher | 4 | 1 | 8
7 | (United States) Buchholz | 6 | 6 | 10

Third round
(United States) Holmberg | 1 | 6 | 7 | 2 | 9
(United States) Savitt | 6 | 4 | 5 | 6 | 7
(United States) Dell | 4 | 4 | 4
7 | (United States) Buchholz | 6 | 6 | 6

Fourth round
(United States) Holmberg | 6 | 7 | 8 | 5 | 6
7 | (United States) Buchholz | 3 | 5 | 10 | 7 | 3

==== Section 2 ====
First round
(Chile) Pabst | 2 | 1 | 5
(United States) Reed | 6 | 6 | 7
(United States) Tully | 4 | 3 | 2
(Spain) Santana | 6 | 6 | 6
(United States) Driscole | 3 | 4 | 6
(United States) Hobbs | 6 | 6 | 8
(United States) Rubell | 6 | 1 | 9 | 6 | 3
(United States) Lambert | 2 | 6 | 11 | 2 | 6
(United States) Perez | 0 | 0 | 2
(United States) Siska | 6 | 6 | 6
(United States) Geller | 6 | 7 | 2 | 1
(United States) Masterson | 8 | 5 | 6 | 6
(United States) Thompson | 1 | 4 | 6 | 5
(United States) Froehling | 6 | 6 | 2 | 7
(United States) Ashe | 2 | 5 | 2
4 | (Australia) Laver | 6 | 7 | 6

Second round
(United States) Reed | 3 | 6 | 6 | 6
(Spain) Santana | 6 | 3 | 4 | 3
(United States) Hobbs | 7 | 1 | 3 | 5
(United States) Lambert | 5 | 6 | 6 | 7
(United States) Siska | 6 | 6 | 6
(United States) Masterson | 3 | 2 | 4
(United States) Froehling | 4 | 0 | 2
4 | (Australia) Laver | 6 | 6 | 6

Third round
(United States) Reed | 6 | 6 | 6
(United States) Lambert | 2 | 1 | 4
(United States) Siska | 5 | 7 | 6 | 4
4 | (Australia) Laver | 7 | 9 | 4 | 6

Fourth round
(United States) Reed | 1 | 4 | 7 | 4
4 | (Australia) Laver | 6 | 6 | 5 | 6

==== Section 3 ====
First round
(United States) McClung | 3 | 6 | 4
(Canada) Godbout | 6 | 8 | 6
(United States) Hoogs | 4 | 6 | 3
(United States) Bond | 6 | 8 | 6
(United States) Palmer | 3 | 3 | 4
(United States) Nelson | 6 | 6 | 6
(United States) Potthast | 1 | 5 | 0
(Guatemala) Gomez | 6 | 7 | 6
(United States) Gottlieb | 0 | 1 | 1
(United States) Hoffman Jr | 6 | 6 | 6
(Venezuela) Notz | 4 | 0 | 6 | 11
(United States) Sullivan | 6 | 6 | 3 | 13
(Guatemala) Hermosilla | 4 | 1 | 4
(United Kingdom) Pickard | 6 | 6 | 6
(United States) Skogstad | 10 | 1 | 1
8 | (Australia) Emerson | 12 | 6 | 6

Second round
(Canada) Godbout | 4 | 4 | 6
(United States) Bond | 6 | 6 | 8
(United States) Nelson | 6 | 6 | 4 | 6
(Guatemala) Gomez | 4 | 1 | 6 | 0
(United States) Hoffman Jr | 6 | 6 | 6
(United States) Sullivan | 4 | 1 | 2
(United Kingdom) Pickard | 2 | 2 | 2
8 | (Australia) Emerson | 6 | 6 | 6

Third round
(United States) Bond | 6 | 6 | 6
(United States) Nelson | 3 | 4 | 4
(United States) Hoffman Jr | 2 | 0 | 0
8 | (Australia) Emerson | 6 | 6 | 6

Fourth round
(United States) Bond | 2 | 11 | 2
8 | (Australia) Emerson | 6 | 13 | 6

==== Section 4 ====
First round
(United States) Wright | 2 | 3 | 3
(United States) McKinley | 6 | 6 | 6
(United States) Sledge | 9 | 12 | 8
(United States) Scott | 11 | 14 | 10
(Colombia) Castillo | 2 | 3 | 4
(Mexico) Palafox | 6 | 6 | 6
(United States) Corley | 4 | 3 | 5
(Canada) Harit | 6 | 6 | 7
(United States) Senkowski | 6 | 4 | 2 | 0
(United States) Clark | 2 | 6 | 6 | 6
(United States) Fitzgibbon | 1 | 6 | 2 | 1
(United States) Werksman | 6 | 4 | 6 | 6
(United States) Schoop | 3 | 1 | 2
(United States) Flam | 6 | 6 | 6
(United States) Dubie | 0 | 1 | 1
1 | (United States) Olmedo | 6 | 6 | 6

Second round
(United States) McKinley | 6 | 6 | 6
(United States) Scott | 2 | 4 | 2
(Mexico) Palafox | 6 | 6 | 6
(Canada) Harit | 1 | 2 | 2
(United States) Clark | 6 | 6 | 6
(United States) Werksman | 3 | 1 | 1
(United States) Flam | 5 | 4 | 8 | 2
1 | (United States) Olmedo | 7 | 6 | 6 | 6

Third round
(United States) McKinley | 6 | 4 | 10 | 6 | 6
(Mexico) Palafox | 3 | 6 | 12 | 4 | 4
(United States) Clark | 6 | 4 | 1 | 2
1 | (United States) Olmedo | 3 | 6 | 6 | 6

Fourth round
(United States) McKinley | 3 | 2 | 4
1 | (United States) Olmedo | 6 | 6 | 6

==== Section 5 ====
First round
(United States) Buck | 1 | 2 | 6
(Canada) Fontana | 6 | 6 | 8
(United States) Eltzholtz | 2 | 1 | 3
(United States) Crawford | 6 | 6 | 6
(United States) Perkins | 4 | 2 | 1
(United States) Bartzen | 6 | 6 | 6
(United States) Lenoir | 7 | 3 | 4 | 2
(United States) Roberts | 5 | 6 | 6 | 6
(United States) Andrews | 1 | 5 | 7 | 4
(United States) Cranston | 6 | 7 | 5 | 6
(United States) Fox | 5 | 3 | 4
(United States) Seixas | 7 | 6 | 6
(United States) Jenkins | 1 | 1 | 3
(United Kingdom) Bennett | 6 | 6 | 6
(United States) Biggs | 2 | 1 | 1
5 | (India) Krishnan | 6 | 6 | 6

Second round
(Canada) Fontana | 3 | 2 | 4
(United States) Crawford | 6 | 6 | 6
(United States) Bartzen | 6 | 6 | 6
(United States) Roberts | 0 | 0 | 2
(United States) Cranston | 3 | 6 | 0 | 7 | 2
(United States) Seixas | 6 | 4 | 6 | 5 | 6
(United Kingdom) Bennett | 4 | 5 | 2
5 | (India) Krishnan | 6 | 7 | 6

Third round
(United States) Crawford | 2 | 4 | 3
(United States) Bartzen | 6 | 6 | 6
(United States) Seixas | 6 | 6 | 6
5 | (India) Krishnan | 3 | 4 | 2

Fourth round
(United States) Bartzen | 6 | 6 | 2 | 8 | 6
(United States) Seixas | 3 | 1 | 6 | 10 | 0

==== Section 6 ====
First round
(United States) Ralph | 2 | 6 | 1 | 4
(Argentina) Soriano | 6 | 2 | 6 | 6
(United States) Greene | 1 | 2 | 2
(Australia) Mark | 6 | 6 | 6
(United States) Beck | 3 | 4 | 5
(United States) Powless | 6 | 6 | 7
(Italy) Tacchini | 5 | 5 | 10 | 6 | 0
(Brazil) Barnes | 7 | 7 | 8 | 4 | 6
(United States) Sears | 2 | 2 | 1
(United States) Farrin | 6 | 6 | 6
(United States) Coss | 7 | 1 | 9
(United States) Henry | 9 | 6 | 11
(United States) Schwartz | 6 | 7 | 2 | 4 | 3
(United States) Mulloy | 3 | 5 | 6 | 6 | 6
(United States) Alleyne | 2 | 2 | 2
3 | (United States) MacKay | 6 | 6 | 6

Second round
(Argentina) Soriano | 1 | 3 | 2
(Australia) Mark | 6 | 6 | 6
(United States) Powless | 14 | 2 | 9
(Brazil) Barnes | 16 | 6 | 11
(United States) Farrin | 10 | 4 | 2
(United States) Henry | 12 | 6 | 6
(United States) Mulloy | 2 | 3 | 4
3 | (United States) MacKay | 6 | 6 | 6

Third round
(Australia) Mark | 6 | 6 | 6
(Brazil) Barnes | 4 | 2 | 4
(United States) Henry | 3 | 6 | 5
3 | (United States) Mackay | 6 | 8 | 7

Fourth round
(Australia) Mark | 4 | 4 | 7
3 | (United States) MacKay | 6 | 6 | 9

==== Section 7 ====
First round
(United States) Barker | 6 | 3 | 2 | 7 | 2
(United States) Hettleman | 4 | 6 | 6 | 5 | 6
(Venezuela) Pimentel | 14 | 6 | 6 | 14
(United States) Shea | 16 | 8 | 2 | 16
(United States) Davis | 4 | 3 | 5
(United States) Dailey | 6 | 6 | 7
(United States) Herren | 5 | 1 | 5
(United States) Buchholz | 7 | 6 | 7
(Cuba) Garrido | 7 | 1 | 2
(Canada) Bedard | 9 | 6 | 6
(United States) Razzetti | 4 | 4 | 6 | 3
(Argentina) Aubone | 6 | 6 | 4 | 6
(United States) Wood | 6 | 4 | 6 | 3 | 4
(United States) Stewart | 4 | 6 | 4 | 6 | 6
(United States) Jungle | 2 | 6 | 2
6 | (Chile) Ayala | 6 | 8 | 6

Second round
(United States) Hettleman | 7 | 2 | 6 | 1 | 6
(United States) Shea | 5 | 6 | 3 | 6 | 4
(United States) Dailey | 6 | 6 | 6
(United States) Buchholz | 2 | 1 | 3
(Canada) Bedard | 6 | 6 | 6
(Argentina) Aubone | 4 | 3 | 0
(United States) Stewart | 2 | 4 | 0
6 | (Chile) Ayala | 6 | 6 | 6

Third round
(United States) Hettleman | 4 | 9 | 6 | 6 | 4
(United States) Dailey | 6 | 11 | 1 | 2 | 6
(Canada) Bedard | 6 | 5 | 2
6 | (Chile) Ayala | 8 | 7 | 6

Fourth round
(United States) Dailey | 1 | 3 | 2
6 | (Chile) Ayala | 6 | 6 | 6

==== Section 8 ====
First round
(United States) Longshore | 3 | 2 | 2
(United States) Morris | 6 | 6 | 6
(Australia) Mulligan | 3 | 6 | 4 | 2
(United States) Nagler | 6 | 2 | 6 | 6
(United States) Kierbow | 6 | 1 | 2 | 6 | 0
(United States) Hernando | 1 | 6 | 6 | 4 | 6
(United States) Boys | 1 | 4 | 3
(Canada) Bassett | 6 | 6 | 6
(United States) Howe | 4 | 6 | 8 | 1 | 2
(India) Lall | 6 | 1 | 6 | 6 | 6
(United States) Ralston | 4 | 0 | 3
(United Kingdom) Wilson | 6 | 6 | 6
(United States) Fisher | 3 | 3 | 3
(United States) Green | 6 | 6 | 6
(United States) Neely | 7 | 5 | 1 | 3
2 | (Australia) Fraser | 5 | 7 | 6 | 6

Second round
(United States) Morris | 4 | 4 | 6 | 6 | 7
(United States) Nagler | 6 | 6 | 4 | 3 | 9
(United States) Hernando | 6 | 6 | 1 | 6
(Canada) Bassett | 4 | 2 | 6 | 1
(India) Lall | 3 | 4 | 2
(United Kingdom) Wilson | 6 | 6 | 6
(United States) Green | 6 | 4 | 1
2 | (Australia) Fraser | 8 | 6 | 6

Third round
(United States) Nagler | 5 | 4 | 6 | 4
(United States) Hernando | 7 | 6 | 4 | 6
(United Kingdom) Wilson | 2 | 4 | 4
2 | (Australia) Fraser | 6 | 6 | 6

Fourth round
(United States) Hernando | 0 | 2 | 3
2 | (Australia) Fraser | 6 | 6 | 6

| Preceded by 1959 Wimbledon Championships – Men's singles | Grand Slam men's singles | Succeeded by 1960 Australian Championships – Men's singles |
