= 1964 U.S. National Championships – Men's singles =

Men's singles
- 1964 U.S. National Championships

Final
- Champion: (Australia) Roy Emerson
- Runner-up: (Australia) Fred Stolle
- Score: 6–4, 6–1, 6–4

Details
- Draw: 128
- Seeds: 8

Events
Singles	men	women
Doubles	men	women
- U.S. National Championships

First-seeded Roy Emerson defeated Fred Stolle 6–4, 6–1, 6–4 in the final to win the men's singles tennis title at the 1964 U.S. National Championships.

== Seeds ==
The seeded players are listed below. Roy Emerson is the champion; others show the round in which they were eliminated.

1. (Australia) Roy Emerson (champion)
2. (United States) Dennis Ralston (quarterfinals)
3. (Mexico) Rafael Osuna (semifinals)
4. (United States) Chuck McKinley (semifinals)
5. (Australia) Fred Stolle (finalist)
6. (Spain) Manuel Santana (second round)
7. (Italy) Nicola Pietrangeli (second round)
8. (United States) Arthur Ashe (fourth round)

== Draw ==
=== Key ===
- Q = Qualifier
- WC = Wild card
- LL = Lucky loser
- r = Retired

=== Finals ===
Quarterfinals
1	(Australia) Roy Emerson	13	8	6
(Australia) Tony Roche	11	6	2
4	(United States) Chuck McKinley	13	9	6
(United Kingdom) Roger Taylor	11	7	1
(United Kingdom) Mike Sangster	6	7	10	3
3	(Mexico) Rafael Osuna	3	9	12	6
5	(Australia) Fred Stolle	6	6	4	3	9
2	(United States) Dennis Ralston	2	3	6	6	7

Semifinals
1	(Australia) Roy Emerson	7	11	6
4	(United States) Chuck McKinley	5	9	4
3	(Mexico) Rafael Osuna	3	6	3
5	(Australia) Fred Stolle	6	8	6

Final
1	(Australia) Roy Emerson	6	6	6
5	(Australia) Fred Stolle	4	1	4

=== Earlier rounds ===
==== Section 1 ====
First round
1	(Australia) Emerson	7	6	6	6
(United Kingdom) Drobný	9	3	2	4
(United States) Newman	6	8	6
(United States) Harrison	4	6	3
(South Africa) Brebnor	2	6	6	6
(Philippines) Ampon	6	1	2	2
(United States) McManus	6	6	6
(United States) Brown	2	4	3
(United States) Reed	6	8	3	7
(South Africa) Mandelstam	1	6	6	5
(Czechoslovakia) Holeček	6	5	6	7
(United States) Glass	3	7	4	5
(Denmark) Ulrich	6	6	6
(United States) Harris	3	1	4
(United States) Drilling	6	6	6
(Mexico) Palafox	4	3	4

Second round
1	(Australia) Emerson	6	6	6
(United States) Newman	2	4	4
(South Africa) Brebnor	1	4	5
(United States) McManus	6	6	7
(United States) Reed	7	5	6	6	2
(Czechoslovakia) Holeček	9	7	1	0	6
(Denmark) Ulrich	6	2	6	6
(United States) Drilling	4	6	3	3

Third round
1	(Australia) Emerson	6	6	8
(United States) McManus	3	2	6
(Czechoslovakia) Holeček	2	5	2
(Denmark) Ulrich	6	7	6

Fourth round
1	(Australia) Emerson	6	6	3	6
(Denmark) Ulrich	3	2	6	3

==== Section 2 ====
First round
8	(United States) Ashe	6	6	6
(Netherlands) Okker	4	4	4
(United States) Simpson
(Venezuela) Pimentel	w/o
(United States) Riessen	6	6	6
(United States) Power	2	3	2
(United States) Sack	7	6	7
(United States) Howe	5	4	5
(Australia) Roche	6	6	6
(United States) Froehling	3	3	4
(South Africa) McMillan	10	7	4	6
(United Kingdom) Stilwell	8	5	6	1
(Spain) Arilla	12	6	1
(United States) Tym	10	3	0	r
(Philippines) Deyro	6	6	6
(United States) Steele III	1	2	1

Second round
8	(United States) Ashe	6	6	6
(United States) Simpson	0	2	0
(United States) Riessen	6	6	6
(United States) Sack	2	0	2
(Australia) Roche	9	6	6
(South Africa) McMillan	7	4	2
(Spain) Arilla	7	6	7
(Philippines) Deyro	5	1	5

Third round
8	(United States) Ashe	4	6	8	2	6
(United States) Riessen	6	3	6	6	4
(Australia) Roche	6	6	6
(Spain) Arilla	4	1	1

Fourth round
8	(United States) Ashe	4	6	6	3	4
(Australia) Roche	6	4	4	6	6

==== Section 3 ====
First round
4	(United States) McKinley	8	6	8
(Canada) Godbout	6	3	6
(India) Lall	6	6	6
(New Zealand) McDonald	2	2	1
(United States) Pasarell	6	8	6
(United States) Buck	2	6	2
(United States) Hoffman Jr	6	6	6
(Ecuador) Zuleta	3	4	0
(France) Darmon	8	6	6
(United Kingdom) Wooldridge	6	0	1
(United States) Fisher	6	7	6
(United States) Sokol	3	5	4
(United States) Holmberg	6	6	6
(United States) Rubinoff	3	2	4
(United States) Sullivan	6	6	6
(South Africa) Weedon	3	3	4

Second round
4	(United States) McKinley	6	6	6
(India) Lall	0	1	2
(United States) Pasarell	8	6	6	6
(United States) Hoffman Jr	10	4	4	2
(France) Darmon	5	7	7	6
(United States) Fisher	7	5	5	0
(United States) Holmberg	6	6	9	6
(United States) Sullivan	1	2	11	2

Third round
4	(United States) McKinley	3	6	6	8
(United States) Pasarell	6	3	2	6
(France) Darmon	4	2	6
(United States) Holmberg	6	6	8

Fourth round
4	(United States) McKinley	7	6	8
(United States) Holmberg	5	4	6

==== Section 4 ====
First round
6	(Spain) Santana	10	4	6	6
(Chile) Cornejo	8	6	3	2
(United Kingdom) Taylor	8	6	6	6
(United States) Higgins	10	0	1	2
(United States) Fitzgibbon
(United States) Skogstad	w/o
(United States) Smith	4	6	6	6
(Australia) Keller	6	4	3	4
(Brazil) Barnes	6	3	8	6
(United States) Siska	4	6	6	3
(United Kingdom) Breed	4	6	6	6	7
(Sweden) Hallberg	6	4	8	2	5
(United States) Graebner	3	7	6	3	8
(United States) Scott	6	5	4	6	6
(Mexico) Palafox	6	6	6
(France) Grinda	4	2	4

Second round
6	(Spain) Santana	6	5	4	9	4
(United Kingdom) Taylor	3	7	6	7	6
(United States) Fitzgibbon	6	8	6
(United States) Smith	3	6	2
(Brazil) Barnes	6	6	6
(United Kingdom) Breed	1	2	1
(United States) Graebner	6	9	6
(Mexico) Palafox	4	7	3

Third round
(United Kingdom) Taylor	10	6	7	9
(United States) Fitzgibbon	12	4	5	7
(Brazil) Barnes	6	6	6
(United States) Graebner	4	4	2

Fourth round
(United Kingdom) Taylor	6	3	8	6
(Brazil) Barnes	3	6	6	3

==== Section 5 ====
First round
(Australia) McKenzie	3	6	8	6	7
(United States) Seewagen	6	3	6	8	5
(United States) Senkowski
(United States) Neely	w/o
(Netherlands) Schneider	2	6	6	7
(West Germany) Buding	6	2	2	5
(Canada) Carpenter	8	6	6
(United States) Sanderlin	6	3	4
(United States) Lenoir	7	6	6
(United States) Karp	5	2	4
(Australia) Newcombe	9	6	6
(South Africa) Diepraam	7	2	3
(United Kingdom) Sangster	6	6	8	6
(United States) Hernando	2	2	10	4
7	(Italy) Pietrangeli	6	7	6
(France) Bresson	3	5	4

Second round
(Australia) McKenzie	3	4	6	6	4
(United States) Senkowski	6	6	3	3	6
(Netherlands) Schneider	4	6	1	8	4
(Canada) Carpenter	6	1	6	6	6
(United States) Lenoir	5	r
(Australia) Newcombe	5
(United Kingdom) Sangster	6	6	6
7	(Italy) Pietrangeli	2	2	0

Third round
(United States) Senkowski	6	7	6
(Canada) Carpenter	3	5	3
(Australia) Newcombe	12	6	15	3
(United Kingdom) Sangster	14	3	17	6

Fourth round
(United States) Senkowski	4	2	4
(United Kingdom) Sangster	6	6	6

==== Section 6 ====
First round
(Chile) Rodríguez	2	7	6	7
(United States) Green	6	5	3	5
(United States) Parker	6	6	6
(United States) Jeff Brown	4	4	1
(Canada) Belkin	2	6	6	7	6
(United States) Susman	6	3	8	5	4
(United States) Richey	6	6	6	6
(United States) Beste	4	2	8	4
(Israel) Davidman	6	6	8
(United States) Pickens	0	3	6
(Australia) Davidson	6	6	6
(Finland) Nyyssönen	3	3	1
(United States) Dell	3	2	6	6	6
(United States) Reed	6	6	4	1	4
3	(Mexico) Osuna	6	6	6
(Belgium) De Gronckel	1	4	2

Second round
(Chile) Rodríguez	5	8	7	6
(United States) Parker	7	6	5	3
(Canada) Belkin	6	2	5	7	4
(United States) Richey	3	6	7	5	6
(Israel) Davidman	1	5	3
(Australia) Davidson	6	7	6
(United States) Dell	9	4	8
3	(Mexico) Osuna	11	6	10

Third round
(Chile) Rodríguez	4	5	10
(United States) Richey	6	7	12
(Australia) Davidson	2	1	2
3	(Mexico) Osuna	6	6	6

Fourth round
(United States) Richey	4	4	4
3	(Mexico) Osuna	6	6	6

==== Section 7 ====
First round
(Australia) Bowrey
(South Africa) Wood	w/o
(United States) Cromwell	12	7	6
(United States) Bond	10	5	4
(United States) Werksman	6	4	14	6
(United States) Goldman	4	6	12	3
(United Arab Republic) El Shafei	1	6	7	3	6
(Pakistan) Hai	6	1	5	6	2
(South Africa) Drysdale	6	6	6
(United States) Jennings	2	1	2
(United States) Powless	1	6	6	5	7
(Ecuador) Guzmán	6	4	3	7	5
(Switzerland) Sturdza	5	6	5
(United States) Wilkinson	7	0	0	r
5	(Australia) Stolle	3	6	6	3	6
(Italy) Majoli	6	3	4	6	1

Second round
(Australia) Bowrey	8	6	3	6
(United States) Cromwell	6	4	6	2
(United States) Werksman	6	8	6
(United Arab Republic) El Shafei	4	6	4
(South Africa) Drysdale	6	5	6	6
(United States) Powless	0	7	2	1
(Switzerland) Sturdza	1	4	3
5	(Australia) Stolle	6	6	6

Third round
(Australia) Bowrey	1	6	2	6	6
(United States) Werksman	6	1	6	3	4
(South Africa) Drysdale	6	8	5	2	2
5	(Australia) Stolle	4	6	7	6	6

Fourth round
(Australia) Bowrey	4	2	3
5	(Australia) Stolle	6	6	6

==== Section 8 ====
First round
(United States) Rombeau	4	8	6	6
(United States) Neely	6	6	3	4
(United States) Seixas	6	6	6
(United States) Fentress	4	0	0
(India) Misra	6	6	6
(South Africa) Phillips	4	3	2
(Chile) Aguirre	3	0	6	8	4
(Australia) Brien	6	6	3	6	0r
(West Germany) Elschenbroich	6	6	6
(Canada) Fauquier	4	3	2
(United States) Henry	6	6	6
(United States) Buchholz	0	4	2
(South Africa) Moore
(Mexico) Contreras	w/o
2	(United States) Ralston	10	5
(Australia) Ryan	8	3	r

Second round
(United States) Rombeau	6	3	6	2	4
(United States) Seixas	4	6	4	6	6
(India) Misra	6	3	5	11	14
(Chile) Aguirre	4	6	7	9	12
(West Germany) Elschenbroich	5	6	3	1
(United States) Henry	7	3	6	6
(South Africa) Moore	0	2	3
2	(United States) Ralston	6	6	6

Third round
(United States) Seixas	7	6	6
(India) Misra	5	2	4
(United States) Henry	6	3	2
2	(United States) Ralston	8	6	6

Fourth round
(United States) Seixas	1	4	2
2	(United States) Ralston	6	6	6

Preceded by 1964 Wimbledon Championships – Men's singles	Grand Slam men's singles	Succeeded by 1965 Australian Championships – Men's singles
