= 1961 U.S. National Championships – Men's singles =

Men's singles
- 1961 U.S. National Championships

Final
- Champion: (Australia) Roy Emerson
- Runner-up: (Australia) Rod Laver
- Score: 7–5, 6–3, 6–2

Details
- Draw: 120
- Seeds: 8

Events
Singles	men	women
Doubles	men	women
- U.S. National Championships

Roy Emerson defeated Rod Laver 7–5, 6–3, 6–2 in the final to win the men's singles tennis title at the 1961 U.S. National Championships.

== Seeds ==
The seeded players are listed below. Roy Emerson is the champion; others show the round in which they were eliminated.

1. (Australia) Rod Laver (finalist)
2. (United States) Chuck McKinley (third round)
3. (Australia) Roy Emerson (champion)
4. (United Kingdom) Mike Sangster (semifinals)
5. (Australia) Bob Mark (fourth round)
6. (United States) Frank Froehling (third round)
7. (United States) Jon Douglas (quarterfinals)
8. (United States) Ron Holmberg (quarterfinals)

== Draw ==
=== Key ===
- Q = Qualifier
- WC = Wild card
- LL = Lucky loser
- r = Retired

=== Final eight ===
Quarterfinals
1	(Australia) Rod Laver	6	7	6	6
(United States) Donald Dell	4	9	3	4
4	(United Kingdom) Mike Sangster	6	7	6
7	(United States) Jon Douglas	4	5	1
(United States) Whitney Reed	8	3	3	2
(Mexico) Rafael Osuna	6	6	6	6
3	(Australia) Roy Emerson	6	6	7
8	(United States) Ron Holmberg	4	2	5

Semifinals
1	(Australia) Rod Laver	13	7	6
4	(United Kingdom) Mike Sangster	11	5	4
(Mexico) Rafael Osuna	3	2	6	7	7
3	(Australia) Roy Emerson	6	6	3	5	9

Final
1	(Australia) Rod Laver	5	3	2
3	(Australia) Roy Emerson	7	6	6

=== Earlier rounds ===
==== Section 1 ====
First round
(Ecuador) Zuleta	6	7	6
(United States) Schunck	1	5	1
(Federation of Rhodesia and Nyasaland) Bey	6	6	6
(United States) Morgan	3	1	4
(United States) Barker	3	6	3	6	6
(United States) Wright	6	2	6	0	3
(United States) Crawford	6	6	6
(United States) Mangan	2	1	2

Second round
1	(Australia) Laver	6	6	6
(United States) Steele III	3	1	0
(United States) Tong	1	3	7	2
(United States) Lloyd	6	6	5	6
(Ecuador) Zuleta	5	6	1	1
(Federation of Rhodesia and Nyasaland) Bey	7	3	6	6
(United States) Barker	6	2	4
(United States) Crawford	8	6	6

Third round
1	(Australia) Laver	6	6	6
(United States) Lloyd	1	2	2
(Federation of Rhodesia and Nyasaland) Bey	1	2	3
(United States) Crawford	6	6	6

Fourth round
1	(Australia) Laver	6	6	6
(United States) Crawford	3	4	3

==== Section 2 ====
First round
6	(United States) Froehling	6	6	6
(United States) Hobbs	2	2	4
(United States) Pasarell	6	6	3	6
(United States) Susman	2	2	6	4
(United States) Dell	7	6	6
(Canada) Carpenter	5	0	4
(United States) Dailey	6	6	6
(United States) Harrison	4	2	4
(United States) Ashe	6	6	9
(United States) Karabasz	2	2	7
(Canada) Godbout	6	7	1	8
(United States) Sherman	4	5	6	6
(Australia) Sharpe	3	6	6	6
(United States) Kamakana	6	3	4	4
(United States) Potthast	6	6	6
(United States) Thompson	2	1	3

Second round
6	(United States) Froehling	6	6	6
(United States) Pasarell	3	4	4
(United States) Dell	6	6	6
(United States) Dailey	3	2	3
(United States) Ashe	3	5	5
(Canada) Godbout	6	7	7
(Australia) Sharpe	4	4	9	6	7
(United States) Potthast	6	6	7	1	5

Third round
6	(United States) Froehling	9	8	1
(United States) Dell	11	10	6
(Canada) Godbout	6	4	6	2
(Australia) Sharpe	8	6	3	6

Fourth round
(United States) Dell	7	6	6	8
(Australia) Sharpe	9	3	2	6

==== Section 3 ====
First round
4	(United Kingdom) Sangster	6	3	6	6
(United States) Perry	2	6	3	4
(United States) Higgins	6	6	6
(United States) Hedrick	2	1	3
(United States) Lambert	6	6	6	6
(United States) Quinn	2	8	2	2
(United States) McManus	6	6	6
(United States) Davis	1	0	0
(United States) Bond	6	6	6
(United States) Powless	0	0	2
(United States) White	6	6	7
(Canada) Fauquier	3	2	5
(Mexico) Palafox	6	6	6
(United States) Werksman	2	2	2
(United States) Nagler	6	6	6
(United States) Vanderbilt	2	3	3

Second round
4	(United Kingdom) Sangster	6	6	6
(United States) Higgins	3	1	3
(United States) Lambert	6	3	4	6	6
(United States) McManus	3	6	6	4	3
(United States) Bond	6	6	6
(United States) White	3	3	3
(Mexico) Palafox	15	6	6
(United States) Nagler	13	1	4

Third round
4	(United Kingdom) Sangster	6	7	6	6
(United States) Lambert	3	9	2	4
(United States) Bond	3	6	3	4
(Mexico) Palafox	6	4	6	6

Fourth round
4	(United Kingdom) Sangster	21	8	6	6
(Mexico) Palafox	19	10	3	4

==== Section 4 ====
First round
7	(United States) Douglas	3	6	10	6
(United States) Richardson	6	2	8	1
(United States) Senkowski	6	6	6
(Chile) Musalem	3	0	2
(United States) Seixas	7	6	6
(United States) Lynch	5	4	0
(United States) Siska	6	6	6
(United States) Lynch	0	2	4
(United States) Henry	9	6	6
(United States) Moss	7	4	4
(United States) Sullivan	6	6	6
(Chile) San Hueza	1	2	1
(United States) Biggs	6	6	3	6
(United States) Botts	3	4	6	2
(Canada) Bedard	6	6	6
(United States) Ralph	3	1	3

Second round
7	(United States) Douglas	6	7	6	6
(United States) Senkowski	3	9	3	3
(United States) Seixas	6	10	6
(United States) Siska	4	8	3
(United States) Henry	6	6	6
(United States) Sullivan	4	3	4
(United States) Biggs	7	2	2
(Canada) Bedard	9	6	6

Third round
7	(United States) Douglas	6	2	2	9	6
(United States) Seixas	4	6	6	7	4
(United States) Henry	5	11	6	6	6
(Canada) Bedard	7	13	1	4	2

Fourth round
7	(United States) Douglas	3	6	7	8
(United States) Henry	6	3	5	6

==== Section 5 ====
First round
2	(United States) McKinley	7	6	6
(United States) Stoesser	5	2	2
(United States) Beck	6	6	6
(United States) Johnson	2	0	4
(United States) Reed	6	8	7
(United States) Howe	4	6	5
(Philippines) Hernandez	4	4	6	8	6
(United States) Reed	6	6	2	6	4
(Ecuador) Olvera	6	6	6
(United States) Herceg	0	0	0
(United States) Fox	6	6	6
(United States) Harris	2	1	1
(Australia) Lane	6	9	6
(United States) Clark	2	7	3
(United States) Hill	5	6	2	6	6
(South Africa) Spengler	7	4	6	0	2

Second round
2	(United States) McKinley	7	6	6
(United States) Beck	5	1	1
(United States) Reed	7	7	7
(Philippines) Hernandez	5	5	5
(Ecuador) Olvera	2	8	11	3
(United States) Fox	6	10	9	6
(Australia) Lane	6	6	6
(United States) Hill	2	1	4

Third round
2	(United States) McKinley	3	7	6	3
(United States) Reed	6	9	3	6
(United States) Fox	6	6	8	3	6
(Australia) Lane	2	0	10	6	1

Fourth round
(United States) Reed	8	6	4	6
(United States) Fox	6	3	6	3

==== Section 6 ====
First round
5	(Australia) Mark	6	6	6
(United States) Fitzgibbon	2	1	0
(Mexico) Palafox	6	6	6
(United States) Buck	4	1	2
(United Kingdom) Taylor	6	6	6
(Canada) Belkin	4	2	2
(United States) Fisher	3	6	6	6
(United States) Richardson	6	2	3	2
(United States) Shaffer	6	6	6
(United States) Gasman	1	2	2
(Mexico) Osuna	6	6	6
(United States) Barizon	2	3	3
(United States) Scott	11	6	3	6
(United States) Driscole	9	3	6	3
(United States) Sokol	7	3	6	6	8
(United States) Rubell	9	6	3	2	6

Second round
5	(Australia) Mark	6	6	6
(Mexico) Palafox	2	2	2
(United Kingdom) Taylor	6	3	6	6	5
(United States) Fisher	4	6	8	3	7
(United States) Shaffer	10	2	7
(Mexico) Osuna	12	6	9
(United States) Scott	4	6	6	5
(United States) Sokol	6	3	2	2	r

Third round
5	(Australia) Mark	6	6	6
(United States) Fisher	4	4	2
(Mexico) Osuna	11	6	6	17	6
(United States) Scott	13	4	8	15	0

Fourth round
5	(Australia) Mark	3	4	6
(Mexico) Osuna	6	6	8

==== Section 7 ====
First round
3	(Australia) Emerson	6	6	6
(United States) Rubinoff	2	1	0
(United States) Brown	6	7	6
(United States) Goldman	3	5	1
(United States) Lenoir	6	6	6
(Canada) Carpenter	0	3	1
(United States) Buchholz	16	5	6	11
(United States) Hoehn	14	7	1	9
(United States) Hoffman Jr	6	6	6
(United States) Greer	0	2	3
(Canada) Fontana	3	7	8	6
(United States) Sorlien	6	5	6	4
(United States) Earnhart	6	6	6
(United States) Dickenson	3	2	0
(United States) Davis	8	6	9
(United States) Sylvia	6	4	7

Second round
3	(Australia) Emerson	6	6	6
(United States) Brown	1	0	1
(United States) Lenoir	6	2	3	3
(United States) Buchholz	1	6	6	6
(United States) Hoffman Jr	10	4	6	7
(Canada) Fontana	8	6	3	5
(United States) Earnhart	6	2	0	r
(United States) Davis	4	6	1

Third round
3	(Australia) Emerson	6	6	6
(United States) Buchholz	3	3	1
(United States) Hoffman Jr	6	6	6
(United States) Davis	3	2	1

Fourth round
3	(Australia) Emerson	6	6	6
(United States) Hoffman Jr	1	2	2

==== Section 8 ====
First round
8	(United States) Holmberg	6	6	7
(United States) Green	4	4	5
(United States) Farrin	8	7	4	6
(South Africa) Hammill	6	5	6	1
(United States) Riessen	6	8	6
(United States) Newman	4	6	0
(United States) Snyder	6	6	6
(United States) Sweeney	4	2	3

Second round
8	(United States) Holmberg	7	6	6
(United States) Farrin	5	1	2
(United States) Riessen	6	8	6
(United States) Snyder	0	6	2
(United States) Graebner	5	6	3	4
(United States) Hoogs	7	1	6	6
(United States) Frost	6	6	6
(United States) Hetherington	1	2	1

Third round
8	(United States) Holmberg	7	6	6
(United States) Riessen	5	4	2
(United States) Hoogs	1	4	2
(United States) Frost	6	6	6

Fourth round
8	(United States) Holmberg	6	7	6	6
(United States) Frost	2	9	4	1

Preceded by 1961 Wimbledon Championships – Men's singles	Grand Slam men's singles	Succeeded by 1962 Australian Championships – Men's singles
