= Atlanta Invitational (tennis) =

Defunct tennis tournament
- Tour: ILTF World Circuit
- Founded: 1934; 92 years ago
- Abolished: 1970; 56 years ago
- Location: Atlanta, Georgia, United States
- Venue: Biltmore Tennis Ckub; Atlanta Country Club; Bitsy Grant Tennis Center
- Surface: Hard / indoors Clay / outdoors

The Atlanta Invitational was a combined men's and women's ULTA/ILTF affiliated clay court tennis tournament founded in 1934. It was first played at the Biltmore Tennis Club in Atlanta, Georgia, United States on indoor hard courts until 1939 and stopped due to World War Two. It resumed in the 1950s at the Atlanta Country Club, and continued to be held annually, when it was last played at the Bitsy Grant Tennis Center in 1970 when it was discontinued.

== History ==
The tournament was first staged in 1934 and was initially played at the Biltmore Tennis Club in Atlanta.

The event was originally played on indoor hard courts at the Biltmore Club, where it was initially also referred to as the Biltmore Invitational.

In 1938 the event moved to the Northside Tennis Club and remained at that venue until 1939 then stopped due to World War II.

The tournament resumed in the 1950s and was played at the Atlanta Country Club on clay courts, during the 1960s it was moved to the Bitsy Grant Tennis Center (founded in 1955), for the duration of its run in 1970.

== Finals ==
=== Men's singles ===
(incomplete roll included).

Year	Winners	Runners-up	Score
1934	(United States) Lester Stoefen	(United States) Bryan Grant	7-5, 7–5, 7–5
1935	(United States) Wilmer Allison	(United States) Bryan Grant	6-3, 6–4, 6–4
1937	(United States) Wayne Sabin	(United States) Bryan Grant	6-0, 6–0, 7–5
1938	(United States) Bobby Riggs	(United States) Dave N. Jones Jr	6–3, 2–6, 6–4, 8–6
1939	(United States) Bryan Grant	(United States) Ernie Sutter	2-6, 7–5, 6–4, 6–3
1958	(United States) Dick Savitt	(United States) Ham Richardson	6-4, 4–6, 6–2, 6–4
1959	(United States) Bernard Bartzen	(Australia) Don Candy	7-5, 6–1, 6–8, 6–3
1960	(United States) Barry MacKay	(United States) Bernard Bartzen	8-6, 6–1, 6–3
1961	(United States) Whitney Reed	(United States) Bernard Bartzen	6-0, 6–1
1963	(United States) Allen Morris	(United States) John Powless	6–0, 6–2, 6–3
1964	(United States) Gardnar Mulloy	(United States) Frank Froehling	5-7, 8–6, 9–7
1965	(United States) Chuck McKinley	(United States) Ham Richardson	3-6, 6–4, 6–1
1966	(United States) Chuck McKinley	(United States) Ronald Holmberg	8-6, 6–4
1967	(United States) Marty Riessen	(United States) Cliff Richey	7-5, 6–2, 6–4
1968	(Australia) Bill Bowrey	(United States) Ronald Holmberg	6-0, 7–5
↓ Open Era ↓
1969	(Brazil) Thomaz Koch	(Australia) Bill Bowrey	6-3, 6–2
1970	(United States) Cliff Richey	(United States) Frank Froehling	6-2, 6–2

=== Women's singles ===
(incomplete roll)

Year	Winners	Runners-up	Score
1969	(United States) Nancy Richey	(United States) Linda Tuero	7-5, 6–2
