= Robert Mark (disambiguation) =

Robert Mark (1917–2010) was an English police officer.

Robert Mark may also refer to:

- Bob Mark (1937–2006), Australian tennis player
- Robert Mark (Austrian actor) (1926–2023), also known as Rudolf Zehetgruber
- Robert Mark (American actor) (born 1934), also known as Rod Dana

== See also ==
- Robert Marc (disambiguation)
- Robert Marks (disambiguation)
