= 1960 U.S. National Championships (tennis) =

- Date: August 21–28 (Note: Men's and women's doubles); September 2–17 (Note: Men's and women's singles and mixed doubles)
- Edition: 80th
- Category: Grand Slam (ILTF)
- Surface: Grass
- Location: Chestnut Hill, Massachusetts; Forest Hills, Queens, New York City; United States
- Venue: Longwood Cricket Club; West Side Tennis Club

Champions

Men's singles
- (Australia) Neale Fraser

Women's singles
- (United States) Darlene Hard

Men's doubles
- (Australia) Neale Fraser / (Australia) Roy Emerson

Women's doubles
- (Brazil) Maria Bueno / (United States) Darlene Hard

Mixed doubles
- (United States) Margaret Osborne / (Australia) Neale Fraser
- U.S. National Championships

The 1960 U.S. National Championships (now known as the US Open) was a tennis tournament that took place on outdoor grass courts at two locations in the United States. The men's and women's singles as well as the mixed doubles were played from September 2 through September 17 at the West Side Tennis Club, Forest Hills in New York City, while the men's and women's doubles were held at the Longwood Cricket Club in Chestnut Hill, Massachusetts from August 21 through August 28, 1960. It was the 80th staging of the U.S. National Championships, and the fourth Grand Slam tennis event of 1960. Neale Fraser and Darlene Hard won the singles titles.

== Finals ==
=== Men's singles ===
(Australia) Neale Fraser defeated (Australia) Rod Laver 6–4, 6–4, 9–7

=== Women's singles ===
(United States) Darlene Hard defeated (Brazil) Maria Bueno 6–4, 10–12, 6–4

=== Men's doubles ===
(Australia) Neale Fraser / (Australia) Roy Emerson defeated (Australia) Rod Laver / (Australia) Bob Mark 9–7, 6–2, 6–4

=== Women's doubles ===
(Brazil) Maria Bueno / (United States) Darlene Hard defeated (United Kingdom) Ann Haydon / (United Kingdom) Deidre Catt 6–1, 6–1

=== Mixed doubles ===
(United States) Margaret Osborne duPont / (Australia) Neale Fraser defeated (Brazil) Maria Bueno / (Mexico) Antonio Palafox 6–3, 6–2

== Notes ==
Preceded by 1960 Wimbledon Championships	Grand Slams	Succeeded by 1961 Australian Championships
