= Ronald Holmberg =

American tennis player

Ron Holmberg
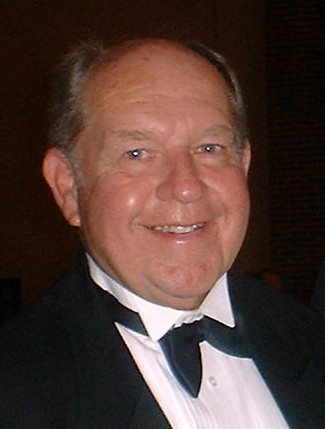
- Full name: Ronald Edward Holmberg
- Country (sports): United States
- Residence: Cornwall-on-Hudson, New York; New Orleans, Louisiana
- Born: January 27, 1938 (age 88) Brooklyn, New York
- Height: 6 ft 2 in (1.88 m)
- Turned pro: 1954 (amateur); 1968 (WCT)
- Retired: 1973
- Plays: Right-handed (one-handed backhand)

Singles
- Career record: 457–251 (64.54%)
- Career titles: 28
- Highest ranking: No. 7 (1959, Lance Tingay)

Grand Slam singles results
- French Open: QF (1961)
- Wimbledon: 3R (1964, 1966)
- US Open: SF (1959)

Other tournaments
- Professional majors

Doubles
- Career record: 21–24

Grand Slam doubles results
- Wimbledon: QF (1960)

Grand Slam mixed doubles results
- US Open: SF (1962) with Jan Lehane

Team competitions
- Davis Cup: F (1957^{Ch})

Ronald "Ronnie" Edward Holmberg (born January 27, 1938) is a former American tennis player who competed during the 1950s, 1960s and 1970s. He was ranked world No. 7 in 1959 and was ranked in the U.S. Top 10 for nine years. He is currently one of the USTA's select "Master Professionals" and devotes most of his time coaching, participating and directing charity events and clinics and other tennis related projects.

== Summary ==
=== College ===
Holmberg won his first tournament at age 12 and won three out of the four possible U.S. National Boys' titles in 1953. He won the Junior Wimbledon title in 1956. He graduated from Tulane University where he was a three time All-American and won the SEC singles twice and doubles championship three times and the NCAA doubles championship twice.

=== Tennis career ===
Holmberg won the Junior Wimbledon title in 1956 defeating Rod Laver in the final.

In 1957, he won the Eastern Clay Court Championships defeating Tony Vincent. Holmberg played in several Blue Gray events when it was an individual competition. He won the singles championship in 1959 and captured back-to-back Blue Gray doubles titles in 1957 and 1958.

Holmberg reached the 1959 U.S. National Championships (the US Open) Men's Singles semifinals, defeating Dick Savitt in five sets, Butch Buchholz in five sets, and Laver in four sets in the quarterfinals, then lost to Alex Olmedo. He reached the quarterfinals at the 1961 French Open where he lost to Laver.

In December 1962, Holmberg won the Bluebonnet Invitation indoor in Houston, defeating Cliff Richey in the quarterfinals and Frank Froehling in the final. In March 1964, Holmberg won the Altamira International Invitation in Caracas, Venezuela, respectively defeating Nikola Pilić, Rafael Osuna, Manuel Santana, and then Roy Emerson in the final. In August 1965, Holmberg won the Canadian International Championships, defeating Billy Lenoir in the semifinals and Lester Sack in the final.

Holmberg won the New York International tournament in August 1968, defeating Tom Gorman and Joaquín Loyo-Mayo. The same month, he won the Southampton Invitation tournament on grass in Long Island, New York, defeating Jaime Fillol, Ray Moore, and Gene Scott.

=== Rankings ===
Holmberg was ranked world No. 8 for 1959 by Ned Potter, No. 4 in the U.S. in 1959 and ranked in the top 10 of U.S. Men's singles for nine years.

He was selected to be a playing member of the U.S. Davis Cup Team four times.

He won numerous international doubles titles with many prominent players such as Barry MacKay (in Davis Cup), Pancho Gonzalez, John Newcombe, Tony Roche, Bob Mark and Arthur Ashe. Holmberg and Ashe were ranked No. 3 in the U.S.

== Post-playing career ==
After retiring from professional competition in 1971, he became head coach of tennis and squash at the U.S. Military Academy, West Point. Holmberg continued to be involved in teaching tennis, and he is widely recognized as one of the game's outstanding coaches. He was a member of Tennis Magazine's Instruction Advisory Board, which consisted of the top playing and teaching pros in the game for its duration of 19 years.

== Recognition ==
He was inducted into the Intercollegiate Tennis Hall-of-Fame, the USTA Eastern Tennis Hall-of-Fame, Louisiana Tennis Hall-of-Fame and the USTA Southern Tennis Hall-of-Fame his eighth Hall of Fame He was a recipient of the USTA “Lifetime Achievement Award” in 1997 for his all-around accomplishment in both playing and teaching and the USTA George Seewagen Award in 1999 for excellence in playing and service to the game.

== Career highlights ==
- Junior Wimbledon Singles champion in 1956
- Intercollegiate highlights while at Tulane University:

- All-American (first team) (1957, 1958, 1959)
- NCAA Doubles champion with Crawford Henry (1957, 1959)
- SEC Singles champion (1958, 1959),
- SEC Doubles champion with Crawford Henry (1957, 1959), with Lester Sack (1958)

- U.S. National Championships (the US Open) Men's Singles semifinalist(#4) (1959)
- U.S. National Championships (the US Open) Men's Singles quarterfinalist (1961)
- French Championships (the French Open) Men's Singles quarterfinalist (1961)
- U.S. National Indoor Doubles Championships, Champion 1961 with Chris Crawford, finalist 1962 with Whitney Reed
- Played in several Blue Gray events when it was an individual competition. In 1959, won the singles championship. In 1957 and 1958, captured back-to-back Blue Gray doubles titles.
- Selected as a playing member to the U.S. Davis Cup Team four times
- Rogers Cup: 1965 Canadian Championships Singles champion
- Rogers Cup: 1965 Canadian Championships Doubles champion with Lester Sack
- Rogers Cup: 1969 Canadian Open Doubles champion with John Newcombe
- Los Angeles Open: 1969 Doubles champion with Pancho Gonzalez
- Ranked in the U.S. "Top Ten" nine times ( 1957 : No 6, 1959 : No 4, 1960 : No 7, 1961 : No 7, 1964 : No 6, 1965 : No 9, 1966 : No 6, 1967 : No 6, 1968 : No 6 )

== Junior Grand Slam finals ==
=== Singles: 1 ===
| Result | Year | Championship | Surface | Opponent | Score |
|---|---|---|---|---|---|
| Win | 1956 | Wimbledon | Grass | (Australia) Rod Laver | 6–1, 6–1 |

== Awards and honors ==
- Inducted into the USTA Eastern Tennis Hall of Fame in 1990
- Inducted into the Intercollegiate Tennis Hall of Fame in 1993
- Recipient of the USTA “Lifetime Achievement Award” in 1997 for his all-around accomplishment in both playing and teaching
- Received the USTA George Seewagen Award in 1999 for excellence in playing and service to the game
- Inducted into the Louisiana Tennis Hall of Fame in 2006
- Chairman of the Louisiana Tennis Patrons Foundation
- Member of the USTA select "Master Professionals"
- Inducted into the 2007 Blue Gray National Tennis Classic Hall of Fame
- Inducted into the USTA Southern Tennis Hall of Fame in 2011
- Inducted into the Brooklyn Hall of Fame in 2012
- Inducted into the Tulane Athletic Hall of Fame in 1980
- Inducted into Who's Who at Tulane University in 1960
- Inducted into the Bishop Loughlin Memorial High School Hall of Fame in 1991
- Inducted into Catholic High School Athletic Association (CHSAA) Sports Hall of Fame

== Books and magazines ==
- As a member of the “Instruction Advisory Board" of Tennis Magazine for nineteen years he was featured in the "Classic Instruction Series from Tennis Magazine" which included the following three books: "Tennis Strokes & Strategies", "Tennis: How to Play, How to Win", and "Teach Yourself Tennis!"

== Articles ==
- Life Magazine "A Tennis Future in Kids"
- New York Magazine "How to Play Tennis with Rod Laver and Other Hot-Shots"
- Sports Illustrated "Scorecard"
- Sports Illustrated "An Absence Of Homebreds"
- Sports Illustrated "...these Faces In The Crowd..."
- Sports Illustrated "Great Scott! Gene Won Another One"
- Sports Illustrated "Tennis without Trabert"
- nola.com "Ron Holmberg selected to Southern Tennis Association Hall of Fame"
- City Park Tennis Club of New Orleans "2011 Interview with Ron Holmberg"
