= NAIA men's tennis championships =

Annual college tournament

- Sport: Tennis
- Founded: 1952
- Country: United States; Canada
- Most recent champion: Georgia Gwinnett (11th)
- Website: NAIA.com

The NAIA men's tennis championships are contested at the annual tournament hosted by the National Association of Intercollegiate Athletics to determine the national champions of men's collegiate tennis among its members in the United States and Canada. Held annually since 1966, three separate championships are contested during the tournament: team, singles, and doubles.

The most successful program has been Georgia Gwinnett and Redlands, both with eleven NAIA national titles.

The current champions are Georgia Gwinnett, who won their 11th national title in 2026.

== Results ==
=== Singles, Doubles, and Team titles (1952–1999) ===
NAIA Men's Tennis Championship
Year	Site	Team Championship				Singles Champion	Doubles Champions
Year	Site	Champion(s)	Points	Runner(s)-up	Points	Singles Champion	Doubles Champions
1952	Abilene, Texas	Pepperdine	None			Butch Krikorian (San Jose State)	Harvey Grimshaw & Bill Delay (Pepperdine)
1953	Abilene, Texas	Hardin-Simmons	None			S.L. Shofner (Central State)	Carl Nunn & Wayne Miller (Hardin-Simmons)
1954	Abilene, Texas	Redlands	None			Gene Land (Central State)	Ron Palmer & Jery Boas (Redlands)
1955	Abilene, Texas	Lamar Tech	None			James Schmidt (Lamar Tech)	Don Coleman & Rafael Reyes (Lamar Tech)
1956	San Diego, California	Lamar Tech (2)	None			James Schmidt (Lamar Tech)	Rafael Reyes & Paul Wilkins (Lamar Tech)
1957	Beaumont, Texas	Lamar Tech (3)	None			George Nadlay (Lamar Tech)	Pedro Bueno & Paul Wilkins (Lamar Tech)
1958	Beaumont, Texas	Lamar Tech (4)	None			Pedro Bueno (Lamar Tech)	James Schmidt & Eugene Saller (Lamar Tech)
1959	Charleston, Illinois	Lamar Tech (5)	None			Reginald Bennett (Lamar Tech)	John Sharpe & Don Russell (Pan American)
1960	Kansas City, Missouri	Lamar Tech (6)	59	Pan American	22	Rudy Hernando (Lamar Tech)	John Sharpe & Don Russell (Pan American); Reginald Bennett & Tim Heckler (Lamar Tech)
1961	Kansas City, Missouri	Pan American	29	Southeastern State	10	John Sharpe (Pan American)	John Sharpe & Don Russell (Pan American)
1962	Kansas City, Missouri	Pan American (2)	29	Southeastern State	11	Don Russell (Pan American)	Don Russell & Jerry Wortelboer (Pan American)
1963	Kansas City, Missouri	Pan American (3)	31	East Texas State	16	Ken Lang (Pan American)	John Hunter & Ken Lang (Pan American)
1964	Kansas City, Missouri	Pan American (4)	33	Corpus Christi	30	Don Kierbow (Corpus Christi)	Don Kierbow & Gabino Palafox (Corpus Christi)
1965	Kansas City, Missouri	Pan American (5)	29	East Texas State	15	George Kon (Pan American)	Detley Nitsche & Sherwood Stewart (Pan American)
1966	Kansas City, Missouri	Redlands (2)	30	Corpus Christi	18	John Yeomans (Redlands)	John Yeomans & Bill Schoen (Redlands)
1967	Kansas City, Missouri	Redlands (3)	25	Corpus Christi	17	Doug Verdieck (Redlands)	Eduardo Guell & Vincente Zarazua (Corpus Christi)
1968	Kansas City, Missouri	Redlands (4)	34	Southeastern State	19	Doug Verdieck (Redlands)	Doug Verdieck & Bruce Nelson (Redlands)
1969	Kansas City, Missouri	Redlands (5)	43	Southeastern State	32	Doug Verdieck (Redlands)	Doug Verdieck & Randy Verdieck (Redlands); George Amaya & Jim Amaya (Prebysterian)
1970	Kansas City, Missouri	Redlands (6)	44	Southeastern State	33	Doug Verdieck (Redlands)	Doug Verdieck & Randy Verdieck (Redlands)
1971	Kansas City, Missouri	Redlands (7)	41	Presbyterian	36	George Amaya (Presbyterian)	George Amaya & Milan Kofol (Presbyterian)
1972	Kansas City, Missouri	East Texas State	37	Redlands	35	Harry Fritz (East Texas State)	Harry Fritz & Bob Hochstadter (East Texas State)
1973	Kansas City, Missouri	Redlands (8)	32	Presbyterian	28	Bob Hochstadter (East Texas State)	Dave Petersen & Tim Butorac (Gustavus Adolphus)
1974	Kansas City, Missouri	Redlands (9)	34	California Baptist	33	Stan Franker (Texas Southern)	Bengt Anthin & John Blomberg (California Baptist)
1975	Kansas City, Missouri	Redlands (10)	30	Presbyterian	28	Dave Petersen	Benny Sims & Glenn Moolchan (Texas Southern)
1976	Kansas City, Missouri	Mercyhurst	39	Redlands	27	Kari Pesonen (Mercyhurst)	Reijo Tuomola & Martin Sturgess (Mercyhurst)
1977	Kansas City, Missouri	Flagler	31	Southwest Texas State	24	Gordon Jones (Flagler)	Gordon Jones & Jim Twigg (Flagler)
1978	Kansas City, Missouri	East Texas State (2)	28	Atlantic Christian	25	Francois Synaeghel (Belhaven)	Jeff Gibson & Bruce Gibson (East Texas State)
1979	Kansas City, Missouri	Atlantic Christian	28	Gustavus Adolphus	26	Garry Seymour (Southwest Texas State)	Mike Puc & Dave Kraus (Flagler)
1980	Kansas City, Missouri	Redlands (11)	36	Southwest Texas State; Gustavus Adolphus	26	John Mattke (Gustavus Adolphus)	Tony Mmohe & Bullus Hussaini (Saint Augustine's)
1981	Kansas City, Missouri	Southwest Texas State	36	Redlands	31	Brian Lusson (Southwest Texas State)	Brian Lusson & Bart Bernstein (Southwest Texas State)
1982	Kansas City, Missouri	Southwest Texas State (2)	36	Redlands	24	Chuck Nunn (Southwest Texas State)	Jeff Bramlett & Russell Angell (Southwest Texas State)
1983	Kansas City, Missouri	Belhaven	33	Lander	32	Al Jordan (Southwest Baptist)	Stephen Bonneau & Martin Dyotte (Belhaven)
1984	Kansas City, Missouri	Atlantic Christian (2); Southwest Baptist	29	Belhaven	28	Peter Pristach (Lander)	Kevin Kopp & Gregg Yarbrough (Southwest Baptist)
1985	Kansas City, Missouri	Lander	33	Flagler	27	Martin Dyotte (Belhaven)	Tobias Svantesson & Paul Valois (Flagler)
1986	Kansas City, Missouri	Flagler (2)	33	Lander	30	Tobias Svantesson (Flagler)	Tobias Svantesson & Per Asklund (Flagler)
1987	Kansas City, Missouri	Auburn Montgomery	26	College of Charleston	25	Jeff Skeldon (Auburn Montgomery)	Matt Willson & Eric Girard (College of Charleston)
1988	Kansas City, Missouri	Lander (2)	33	Texas–Tyler	30	Keith Evans (Belhaven)	Per Asklund & Michael Malvebo (Flagler)
1989	Kansas City, Missouri	Texas–Tyler	35	Auburn Montgomery	24	Ken Olivier (Texas–Tyler)	Ken Olivier & Chris Harris (Texas–Tyler)
1990	Kansas City, Missouri	Elon	31	North Florida	26	Roland Thornquist (Elon)	Roland Thornquist & Stefan Hager (Elon)
1991	Kansas City, Missouri	Lander (3)	35	BYU Hawaii; West Florida	27	Yue Wang (BYU Hawaii)	Eric Hochman & Geoff Watts (West Florida)
1992	Kansas City, Missouri	Lander (4)	31	BYU Hawaii	26	Niclas Nilsson (Lander)	Sorin Cherebetiu & Andrej Tonejc (West Florida)
1993	Kansas City, Missouri	Mobile	28	Auburn Montgomery; North Florida	23	Giorgio Carneade (Lynn)	Mattias Karlsson & Jacques Theron (Mobile)
1994	Tulsa, Oklahoma	Texas–Tyler (2)	39	Oklahoma City	32	Brock Connolly (Oklahoma City)	Brock Connolly & Fadel Berthe (Oklahoma City)
1995	Tulsa, Oklahoma	Auburn Montgomery (2)	31	Oklahoma City	27	Jonas Andersson (Incarnate Word)	Jonas Andersson & Javier Ruiz (Incarnate Word)
1996	Tulsa, Oklahoma	Auburn Montgomery (3)	34	Mobile	22	Ivan Keskinov (Lynn)	Gustavo Silva & Rodrigo Monte (Auburn Montgomery)
1997	Tulsa, Oklahoma	Mobile (2)	33	Auburn Montgomery	26	Riva DaSilva (Westmont)	Federico Contreras & Ricardo Ferreira (Freed–Hardeman)
1998	Tulsa, Oklahoma	Oklahoma City	31	Mobile	26	Alfonso Honrado (Oklahoma City)	Alfonso Honrado & Andreas Lundgren (Oklahoma City)
1999	Boca Raton, Florida	Oklahoma City (2)	35	Auburn Montgomery	30	Ricardo Mena (Flagler)	Egberto Caldas & Cesar Reano (Oklahoma City)

=== Team title only (2000–present) ===
NAIA Men's Tennis Championship
Year	Site	Team Championship		
Year	Site	Champion	Score	Runner-up
2000	Lexington, Kentucky	Oklahoma City (3)	6–3	Auburn Montgomery
2001	Lexington, Kentucky	Oklahoma City (4)	5–2	Georgia Southwestern
2002	Peachtree City, Georgia	Auburn Montgomery (4)	5–0	Vacated
2003	Peachtree City, Georgia	Oklahoma Christian	5–1	Azusa Pacific
2004	Mobile, Alabama	Auburn Montgomery (5)	5–0	Azusa Pacific
2005	Mobile, Alabama	Azusa Pacific	5–3	Santa Fe (NM)
2006	Mobile, Alabama	Auburn Montgomery (6)	5–0	Azusa Pacific
2007	Mobile, Alabama	Auburn Montgomery (7)	5–0	Azusa Pacific
2008	Mobile, Alabama	Auburn Montgomery (8)	5–3	Fresno Pacific
2009	Mobile, Alabama	Fresno Pacific	5–3	Auburn Montgomery
2010	Mobile, Alabama	Auburn Montgomery (9)	5–3	Fresno Pacific
2011	Mobile, Alabama	Fresno Pacific (2)	5–1	Embry–Riddle
2012	Mobile, Alabama	Oklahoma Christian (2)	5–4	Fresno Pacific
2013	Mobile, Alabama	Embry–Riddle	5–4	Auburn Montgomery
2014	Mobile, Alabama	Georgia Gwinnett	5–1	Embry–Riddle
2015	Mobile, Alabama	Georgia Gwinnett (2)	5–0	Embry–Riddle
2016	Mobile, Alabama	Georgia Gwinnett (3)	5–2	Xavier Louisiana
2017	Mobile, Alabama	Georgia Gwinnett (4)	5–0	Xavier Louisiana
2018	Mobile, Alabama	Georgia Gwinnett (5)	5–0	Keiser
2019	Mobile, Alabama	Georgia Gwinnett (6)	5–0	Xavier Louisiana
2020	Cancelled due to COVID-19 pandemic			
2021	Mobile, Alabama	Georgia Gwinnett (7)	4–1	Keiser
2022	Mobile, Alabama	Georgia Gwinnett (8)	4–1	Keiser
2023	Mobile, Alabama	Georgia Gwinnett (9)	4–0	Tennessee Wesleyan
2024	Mobile, Alabama	Georgia Gwinnett (10)	4–0	Keiser
2025	Mobile, Alabama	Keiser	4–2	Georgia Gwinnett
2026	Mobile, Alabama	Georgia Gwinnett (11)	4–0	Tennessee Wesleyan
2027	Mobile, Alabama			
2028	Mobile, Alabama			

== Champions ==
=== Team titles ===
==== Active NAIA programs ====
Team	Titles	Years
Georgia Gwinnett	11	2014, 2015, 2016, 2017, 2018, 2019, 2021, 2022, 2023, 2024, 2026
Oklahoma City	4	1998, 1999, 2000, 2001
Mobile	2	1993, 1997
Keiser	1	2025

==== Former NAIA programs ====
Team	Titles	Years
Redlands	11	1954, 1966, 1967, 1968, 1969, 1970, 1971, 1973, 1974, 1975, 1980
Auburn Montgomery	9	1987, 1995, 1996, 2002, 2004, 2006, 2007, 2008, 2010
Lamar	6	1955, 1956, 1957, 1958, 1959, 1960
Texas–Rio Grande Valley	5	1961, 1962, 1963, 1964, 1965
Lander	4	1985, 1988, 1991, 1992
Oklahoma Christian	2	2003, 2012
Fresno Pacific	2	2009, 2011
Texas–Tyler	2	1989, 1994
Flagler	2	1977, 1986
Barton	2	1979, 1984
Texas State	2	1981, 1982
Texas A&M–Commerce	2	1972, 1978
Embry–Riddle	1	2013
Azusa Pacific	1	2005
Elon	1	1990
Southwest Baptist	1	1984
Belhaven	1	1983
Mercyhurst	1	1976
Hardin–Simmons	1	1953
Pepperdine	1	1952

=== Singles titles ===
Rank	Team	Titles
1	Lamar	6
2	Redlands	5
3	Pan American	4
4	Belhaven	3
4	Flagler	3
4	Texas State	3
5	Central Oklahoma	2
5	Texas A&M–Commerce	2
5	Gustavus Adolphus	2
5	Lynn	2
5	Lander	2
5	Oklahoma City	2
6	Auburn Montgomery	1
6	BYU Hawaii	1
6	Texas A&M–Corpus Christi	1
6	Elon	1
6	Incarnate Word	1
6	Mercyhurst	1
6	Presbyterian	1
6	San Jose State	1
6	Southwest Baptist	1
6	Texas Southern	1
6	Texas–Tyler	1
6	Westmont	1

=== Doubles titles ===
Rank	Team	Titles
1	Texas–Rio Grande Valley	6
2	Flagler	5
2	Lamar	5
2	Redlands	5
3	Oklahoma City	3
4	Texas A&M–Corpus Christi	2
4	Texas A&M–Commerce	2
4	Texas State	2
4	Presbyterian	2
4	West Florida	2
5	Auburn Montgomery	1
5	Belhaven	1
5	California Baptist	1
5	College of Charleston	1
5	Elon	1
5	Freed–Hardeman	1
5	Gustavus Adolphus	1
5	Hardin-Simmons	1
5	Incarnate Word	1
5	Mercyhurst	1
5	Mobile	1
5	Pepperdine	1
5	Saint Augustine's	1
5	Southwest Baptist	1
5	Texas Southern	1
5	Texas–Tyler	1

- Schools highlighted in pink are closed or no longer sponsor athletics.
- Schools highlight in yellow have reclassified athletics from the NAIA.

== See also ==
- NAIA Women's Tennis Championship
- NCAA Men's Tennis Championships (Division I, Division II, Division III)
- NCAA Women's Tennis Championships (Division I, Division II, Division III)
