= Robert Marc =

Robert Marc may refer to:

- Robert Marc (fencer), French Olympic fencer
- Robert Marc (artist) (1943–1993), French artist
- Robert E. Marc, American neuroscientist

== See also ==
- Robert Mark (disambiguation)
