= Robert Marx =

Robert or Bob Marx may refer to:

- Robert F. Marx (1933–2019), underwater archaeologist, treasure hunter, and author
- Robert Marx (fencer) (born 1956), American Olympic fencer

== See also ==
- Robert Marks (disambiguation)
- Marx (surname)
