= Japanese Pro Championships =

Defunct tennis tournament
- Tour: Pro Tennis Tour
- Founded: 1960
- Abolished: 1963
- Editions: 2
- Location: Osaka; Tokyo; Japan
- Venue: Tokyo Metropolitan Gymnasium; Osaka Prefectural Gymnasium
- Surface: Wood / indoor
- Prize money: $10,000 (1960)

The Japanesese Pro Championships was a men's professional indoor wood court tennis tournament founded in 1960 and organized by promoter American Jack Kramer. Also known as the Japan Professional Championships or Japan Pro it was first played at the 1960, in Tokyo, Japan. The event was last played in Osaka and Tokyo, Japan when it was discontinued.

== History ==
In 1960 Jack Kramer organized the first pro knock out elimination tennis tournament to be played in Tokyo, Japan from 8 to 13 November 1960. The tournament had an average of 7000 spectators per day including the crown prince and crown princess of Japan on finals day with Australia's Lew Hoad claiming the $1800 prize money.

In 1963 Japan Professional Championships were revived (often tracked historically as the Japan Pro), that took place in late October and early November of 1963. This was part of the Jack Kramer pro tour circuit and featured tennis legends like Rod Laver, Ken Rosewall, Frank Sedgman, and Butch Buchholz playing a round-robin format on indoor wood courts in Osaka, before moving to Tokyo for the indoor finals.

== Past finals ==
=== Singles 1960 ===
Year	Location	Champions	Runners-up	Score
1960	Tokyo	(Australia) Lew Hoad	(Australia) Ken Rosewall	6–2, 0–6, 3–6, 6–1, 13–11

=== Singles 1963 ===
==== First & Second Place ====
Year	Location	Champions	Runners-up	Score
1963	Tokyo	(United States) Butch Buchholz	(Australia) Rod Laver	6–3, 6–4

==== Third & Fourth Place ====
Year	Location	Champions	Runners-up	Score
1963	Tokyo	(Australia) Frank Sedgman	(Australia) Lew Hoad	7–5, 6–8, 6–3

== See also ==
- World Pro Tennis Japan Series (1969)
