= Robert Marks =

Robert Marks may refer to:

- Robert Marks (management), professor at Australian Graduate School of Management
- Robert J. Marks II (born 1950), professor of engineering at Baylor University
- Robert Marks (vocal coach), American vocal coach

== See also ==
- Robert Mark (disambiguation)
- Robert Marx (disambiguation)
- Marks (surname)
