= Kingman Lambert =

American tennis player (1928–2021)

- Full name: Kingman Bemis Lambert
- Country (sports): United States
- Born: October 19, 1928 St. Louis, Missouri, United States
- Died: August 30, 2021 (aged 92)

Singles

Grand Slam singles results
- US Open: 3R (1959, 1960, 1961, 1965)

Kingman Bemis Lambert (October 19, 1928 – August 30, 2021) was an American amateur tennis player.

Born in St. Louis, Missouri, Lambert came from a well known local business family, with his grandfather Albert Bond Lambert a financial backer of aviator Charles Lindbergh. Their family company, Lambert Pharmaceutical Co, were the makers of Listerine. He was raised in Greenwich, Connecticut.

Lambert studied economics at the University of Virginia, where he played collegiate tennis.

A marine pilot, Lambert competed in inter–service championships and also spent a period on tour, winning the Bermuda Open singles title in 1959. He featured in the doubles main draws of the 1961 Wimbledon Championships.

Lambert lived in retirement in Idaho.
