= Bernard Bartzen =

American tennis player (1927–2019)

Tut Bartzen
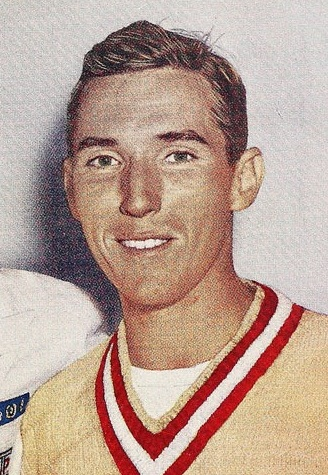
- Full name: Bernard James Bartzen
- Country (sports): United States
- Born: November 25, 1927 Austin, Texas, U.S.
- Died: July 10, 2019 (aged 91) Ft. Worth, Texas, U.S.
- Turned pro: 1945 (amateur tour)
- Retired: 1960
- Plays: Left-handed (one-handed backhand)
- College: College of William & Mary

Singles
- Highest ranking: No. 8 (1959, Lance Tingay)

Grand Slam singles results
- French Open: 4R (1953)
- Wimbledon: 2R (1953)
- US Open: SF (1959)

Bernard "Tut" Bartzen (November 25, 1927 – July 10, 2019) was an American tennis player in the mid-20th century, who later became a winning college tennis coach.

== Biography ==
Born in 1927 in Austin, Texas, Bartzen moved with his family to San Angelo when he was 5 years old. He won three Texas state high school titles — two in singles and one in doubles — and the National Interscholastic singles championship.

Bartzen attended the College of William & Mary, where the left-hander posted a 50–0 singles record. He also won the NCAA doubles title with Fred Kovaleski in 1948.

Bartzen went on the American tennis circuit and was ranked in the top 10 nine straight years (1953–1961), two of them at No. 2 (1959 and 1960). Lance Tingay of The Daily Telegraph ranked him world No. 8 for 1959. During his career, he had wins over such future Hall of Famers as Vic Seixas and Tony Trabert. One of those wins over Trabert came in 1955 in the final at the event in Cincinnati, where Bartzen won three titles: 1955, 1957 and 1958.

Bartzen reached the semifinals of the U.S. National Championships in 1959 (beating Vic Seixas and third-seeded Barry MacKay before losing to eventual champion Neale Fraser) and the quarterfinals in 1955.

He also won four U.S. Clay Court Championships held at River Forest, Illinois in 1954 defeating Tony Trabert in the final, in 1958 defeating Sammy Giammalva in the final, in 1959 defeating Whitney Reed in the final, and in 1961.

Bartzen won the Canadian National title on red clay in 1954.

Bartzen was a member of the U.S. Davis Cup team between 1952 and 1961 and won all his 15 singles matches. In 1959 and 1960 he served as co-captain.

After his playing career, Bartzen served 12 years as head tennis pro at Colonial Country Club in Fort Worth, Texas, where he hosted the Colonial National Invitational Tournament, before taking over the Texas Christian University program in 1974. His tennis teams were ranked nationally every year but one in a 20-year stretch.

Bartzen was inducted into the Texas Tennis Hall of Fame in 1982 and the Texas Sports Hall of Fame in 1995.

Bernard James "Tut" Bartzen died on July 10, 2019, 19 years to the day after his wife, Sara Jane Ledbetter.
