= Rudy Hernando =

American tennis player

- Country (sports): United States
- Born: June 10, 1939 (age 86)
- Plays: Right-handed

Singles
- Highest ranking: No. 151 (Oct 15, 1973)

Grand Slam singles results
- Wimbledon: 1R (1961)
- US Open: 4R (1959)

Rudy Hernando (born June 10, 1939) is an American former professional tennis player.

A Detroit native, Hernando notably reached the singles fourth round of the 1959 U.S. National Championships. At the tournament now known as the Cincinnati Masters, he reached the quarterfinals in singles in both 1959 and 1960, and was a doubles finalist in 1960 with William Bond.

Hernando played collegiate tennis for Lamar Tech and was the 1960 NAIA singles champion. In 1961 he appeared in the singles main draw of the Wimbledon Championships and fell in the first round to the top seed Neale Fraser.

Hernando is the son of tennis player Mary Mustaikis, and is a nephew of Boston Red Sox pitcher Alex Mustaikis.
