= Allen Fox =

American tennis player (born 1939)

Allen E. Fox
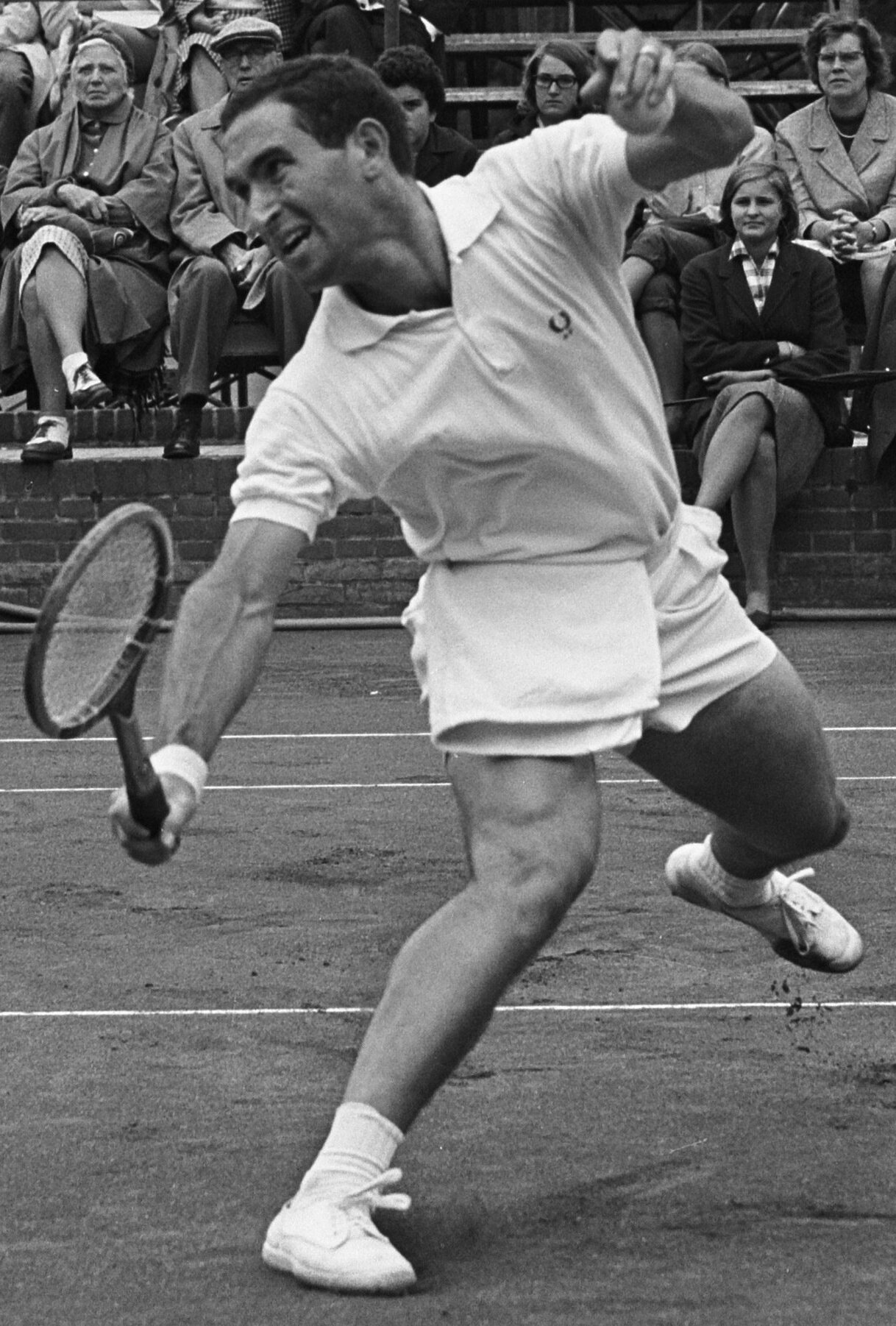
- Allen Fox (1965)
- Country (sports): United States
- Born: June 25, 1939 (age 86) Los Angeles, California
- Height: 5 ft 8 in (1.73 m)
- Turned pro: 1955 (amateur tour)
- Retired: 1971
- College: University of California at Los Angeles (UCLA)
- Official website: AllenFoxTennis.com

Singles

Grand Slam singles results
- French Open: 2R (1965, 1968)
- Wimbledon: QF (1965)
- US Open: 4R (1960, 1961)
Medal record
Representing United States
Tennis
Summer Universiade
Bronze medal – third place	1965 Budapest	Singles
Gold medal – first place	1965 Budapest	Doubles

Allen E. Fox (born June 25, 1939) is an American former tennis player in the 1960s and 1970s who went on to be a college coach and author. He was ranked as high as U.S. No. 4 in 1962, and was in the top ten in the U.S. five times between 1961 and 1968.

In 1960, he won the National Collegiate Athletic Association (NCAA) doubles title with Larry Nagler for the University of California at Los Angeles. In 1961, Fox won the NCAA singles title. In 1962 he won the US National Hard Court title. He won a gold medal in singles at the 1965 Maccabiah Games in Israel. At the 1969 Maccabiah Games he won gold medals in singles and doubles.

Fox was elected to the Intercollegiate Tennis Association Hall of Fame, the Southern California Jewish Sports Hall of Fame, the Southern California Tennis Association Hall of Fame, and the UCLA Athletics Hall of Fame.

== Tennis career ==
Fox attended Beverly Hills High School, and played tennis for the school.

After Fox successfully convinced his friend Larry Nagler to join him and attend the University of California at Los Angeles and play tennis for the Bruins, on a team where Fox was the #1 player, Nagler says "we were bitter rivals and close friends." They were on the junior U.S. Davis Cup team together. Nagler recalled how: "Allen was a vicious competitor who hated to lose, especially to me. One year [1960] at UCLA I beat him in the singles final of the Ojai tournament. After he lost, he broke two racquets and sneered at me that he was going to throw the doubles finals. And I was his partner! He said he couldn't stand for me to win another title. Sure enough, we lost to UCLA teammates we usually thrashed." Nagler and Fox won the doubles title at Ojai in 1961, defeating Bill Hoogs and Jim McManus.

In 1960, he won the National Collegiate Athletic Association (NCAA) doubles title with Larry Nagler for UCLA. In 1961, as team captain, Fox won the NCAA singles title, beating Ray Senkowski of Michigan, 6–1, 6–2, and 6–4. He only lost twice in dual match play while in college, to Rafael Osuna and Chuck McKinley. He was named All-American in 1959, 1960, and 1961, and was named All-UCLA and All-University of California Athlete of the Year. Fox helped lead UCLA to NCAA team championships in 1960 and 1961. In 1961, he was ranked # 8 in the United States ion doubles with Nagler, by the United States Lawn Tennis Association. He graduated from UCLA with a B.A. in physics in 1961, and later earned a Ph.D. there in psychology in 1968.

When he graduated, Fox was the 4th-ranked singles player in the United States. He won the singles title at Cincinnati in 1961. He won also the 1962 US National Hard Court title. That year, he reached the singles final in Cincinnati, falling to Marty Riessen.

Fox played doubles in the 1964 Wimbledon Championships with Nagler. They defeated Gerry Oakley and Humphrey Truman of the United Kingdom in the first round, but lost to Naresh Kumar of India and Jiří Javorský of Czechoslovakia in the second round.

In 1965 he won the Ojai Tennis Tournament in men's singles. In 1965 he reached the quarterfinals at Wimbledon.

In 1966, he won the Canadian Nationals and the (40th annual) Los Angeles Open, formerly known as the Pacific Southwest Championships, as a graduate student, beating the then-current champions of all four Major Slams – Manuel Santana (Wimbledon), Fred Stolle (U.S.), Tony Roche (French), and Roy Emerson (Australian), in the finals.

=== Maccabiah Games ===
Fox is Jewish.

He won a gold medal at the 1965 Maccabiah Games in Israel.

Four years later, he was back at the 1969 Maccabiah Games as the top seed, and again won the gold medal, this time defeating South African Julian Krinsky in the men's individual semi-finals and South African Davis Cup player Jack Saul in the finals. In doubles, he and partner Ronald Goldman won the gold medal after they defeated Americans Tom Karp and Peter Fishbach in the semifinals, and then Americans Ed Rubinoff and Leonard Schloss in the finals.

=== Davis Cup ===
He was named to the U.S. Davis Cup team in 1961, 1962, and 1966. He played 2 singles matches, winning both of them without giving up more than 2 games in any of the 6 sets that he played.

=== Halls of Fame ===
Fox was elected to the Intercollegiate Tennis Association Hall of Fame as a player and a coach in 1988. In 1991, he was inducted into the Southern California Jewish Sports Hall of Fame.

He was inducted into the Southern California Tennis Association Hall of Fame in 2002. Fox was also inducted into the UCLA Athletics Hall of Fame in 2005.

=== Coaching ===
Fox coached the Pepperdine University men's tennis team, at the highest level-Division 1, for 17 years. His teams, which included Brad Gilbert, reached the NCAA finals twice, the semifinals three times, and the quarterfinals six times. In his career, he coached his teams to a 368–108 won-lost record between 1979 and 1995; the .778 winning percentage is the best in Pepperdine tennis history. He was named to the Intercollegiate Tennis Coaches Hall of Fame and, aside from Gilbert, coached players such as Robbie Weiss (NCAA singles winner), Kelly Jones (NCAA doubles winner and world No. 1 doubles player), and Martin Laurendeau (Captain of the Canadian Davis Cup Team).

== Writing and videos ==
Fox has worked as a broadcaster, writer, and lecturer. He has authored several books, including Think to Win: The Strategic Dimension of Tennis (1993), If I'm The Better Player, Why Can't I Win?, and The Winner's Mind: A Competitor's Guide to Sports and Business Success. He is a former editor of Tennis Magazine.

Allen has published two videos, titled Allen Fox's Ultimate Tennis Lesson (2001) and Allen Fox's Ultimate Tennis Drills (2001).

== Personal ==
Fox has two sons, Evan and Charlie, and lives in San Luis Obispo, California, with his wife Nancy.

== See also ==
- List of notable Jewish tennis players
