= Edward Dailey =

American ophthalmologist and tennis player (1933–2018)

- Full name: Edward Geiser Dailey
- Country (sports): United States
- Born: May 5, 1933 Harrisburg, Pennsylvania
- Died: July 2, 2018 (aged 85) Mechanicsburg, Pennsylvania

Grand Slam singles results
- US Open: 4R (1959)

Edward Geiser Dailey (May 5, 1933 – July 2, 2018) was an American ophthalmologist and tennis player.

Born in Harrisburg, Pennsylvania, Dailey played varsity tennis while at Princeton University. His fourth round appearance at the 1959 U.S. National Championships was his best performance at the tournament and ended in a loss to Luis Ayala, the sixth-seed. He became an ophthalmologist and was the founder of Dailey Harvey Eye Associates in Camp Hill.
