= Ray Senkowski =

American tennis player

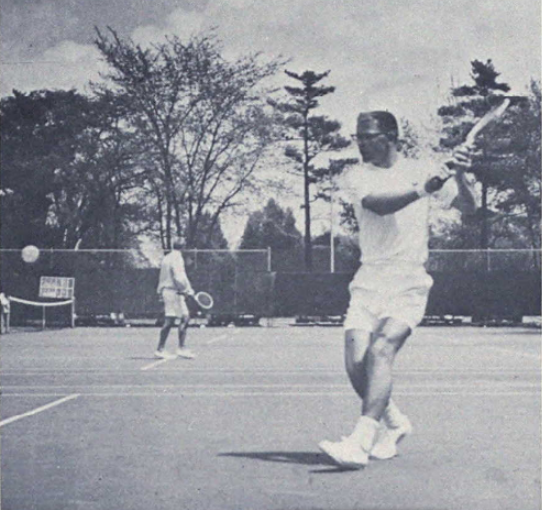
- Senkowski from 1962 Michiganensian
- Country (sports): United States
- Born: February 18, 1941 Hamtramck, Michigan, U.S.
- Died: December 24, 1995 (aged 54)

Ray Senkowski (February 18, 1941 – December 24, 1995) was an American tennis player.

He grew up in Hamtramck, Michigan, and at age 17 won the 1958 national scholastic tennis championship in Charlottesville, Virginia, defeating Frank Froehling.

At the tournament now known as the Cincinnati Masters, he reached the semifinals in 1959, defeating Reg Bennett of Great Britain in the Round of 16 and Rudy Hernando in the quarterfinals before falling to No. 1 seed Whitney Reed. Also in 1959, he defeated top-seeded Ian Vermaak at the Western Open.

Senkowski was recruited by coach Bill Murphy and enrolled at the University of Michigan where he won the 1961 Big Ten Conference singles and doubles championships (with Wayne Peacock) and was a three-time All-American (1961-1963). He lost 6–1, 6–2, 6–4 to Allen Fox of UCLA in the singles final of the 1961 NCAA Tennis Championships at Iowa State University. He was inducted into the University of Michigan Athletic Hall of Honor in 1996.
