= Ramsey Earnhart =

American tennis player (born 1941)

- Country (sports): United States
- Born: November 25, 1941 (age 84) Santa Monica, California

Grand Slam singles results
- US Open: 2R (1961, 1962)

Ramsey Earnhart (born November 25, 1941) is an American former tennis player.

Born in Santa Monica, Earnhart attended St. Catherine’s Academy in Ventura and later Ventura High School.

In the early 1960s he was a collegiate tennis player for the USC Trojans and formed a team which included Rafael Osuna and Dennis Ralston. He participated in three intercollegiate team championships and won the intercollegiate doubles title in 1961 and 1962 with Osuna. In 2001 he was inducted into the ITA Hall of Fame.

Earnhart is married to Roscoe Tanner's sister Sherry Anne.
