= John Powless =

American basketball and tennis coach (1932–2021)

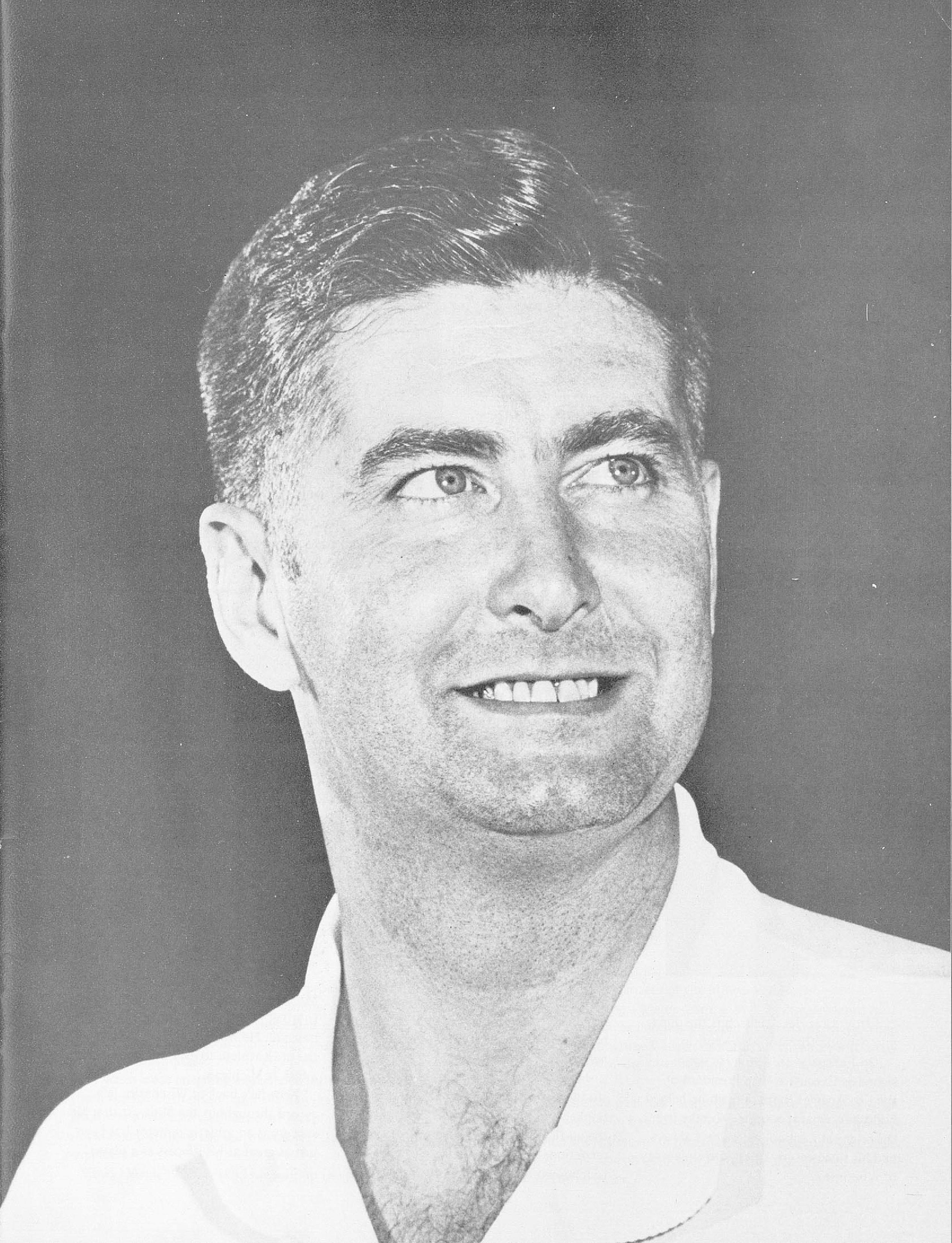
- Powless circa 1972
- Country (sports): United States
- Born: August 24, 1932 Flora, Illinois, U.S.
- Died: May 20, 2021 (aged 88)

Singles
- Career record: 133–99
- Career titles: 7

Grand Slam singles results
- US Open: 2R (1959, 1964)

John Dale Powless (August 24, 1932 – May 20, 2021) was an American basketball and tennis player and coach at the University of Wisconsin–Madison and a player on the international senior tennis circuit.

== Tennis career ==
Powless was born and raised in Flora, Illinois, and played on the Flora High School basketball, tennis and football teams, where he won the State tournament in tennis his senior year, the only person to have done so below Decatur, a record still held to this day. He received a Basketball Scholarship to the University of Michigan with an agreement to play tennis. After one semester he left and went to Murray State University and graduated in 1956. He played basketball and tennis and still ranks among the school's all-time greats in both sports. He was one of five charter members in Murray State's Hall of Fame, which was originated in 1957. He returned to Michigan and earned a master's degree.

As a 6'5" sophomore forward in 1955, he led his team to the Kentucky Invitational title. As a tennis player, Powless never lost a tennis match in three years of varsity competition and was the Ohio Valley Conference singles champion all three seasons. He also shared the conference doubles championship all three years and later served six years as captain and coach of the United States Junior Davis Cup team.

Powless lost in the first round of the 1955, 1956, 1962, and 1963 U.S. National Championships, but reached the second round in 1959 and 1964.

His finest season was 1960 with three tournament wins. He defeated Billy Lenoir, a later Cincinnati Open champion, in the final of the 1960 ILTF Southern Championships in Atlanta in three straight sets. He won the 1960 Anniston, Alabama event, defeating Lester Sack and Harry Hoffman Jr. in the semifinal and final.

== Other sports career ==
After graduation, Powless coached at the high school level at Paducah, Kentucky for a year and joined Bud Kennedy as an assistant basketball coach at Florida State University the following year. In 1960, he became freshman coach at the University of Cincinnati and compiled a 36-9 three-year record and a 15–0 record during the 1962–63 season. Working with head coach Ed Jucker and assistant (and later head) coach Tay Baker, Powless helped the Bearcats post a 78–6 record over three years. During the three years that Powless was at Cincinnati, the Bearcats won two NCAA titles by defeating Ohio State in 1961 and 1962 and finished second to Loyola University Chicago in 1963.

Powless came to Wisconsin as an assistant under John Erickson in May 1963 and also was Wisconsin's head tennis coach for five seasons, compiling a 52–39 dual meet record. On April 27, 1968, Powless became head basketball coach on the same day that Army head coach Bob Knight declined the offer. During his eight years at Wisconsin, he compiled a record of 88–108. His best team was his 1973–74 team, which posted a record of 16–8 and had future NBA center Kim Hughes on its roster. He resigned on February 11, 1976 during a Badgers' 14‐game losing streak and was replaced by Bill Cofield one month later on March 16.

== Later tennis career ==
After his career at Wisconsin, Powless owned and operated the John Powless Tennis Center in Madison, Wisconsin. He was a basketball and tennis TV analyst and played tennis on the international senior circuit. He also won numerous national and international tennis competitions, including a 1999 U.S. Senior Open singles title.

During the peak of his tennis playing ability in the 1950s he and his father attempted and succeeded in conquering the national clay court Father and Son championships (U.S.) following through to win five consecutive national clay court Father and Son doubles titles. Concurring that he achieved this in the 1950s by winning the Father and Son National Title five consecutive years with his father K.O. Cecil Powless.

John started his career in ITF by earning a number one ranking in singles and doubles for men age 55 and older. The record for consecutive number of years held in age divisions of ITF is held by John, thus placing him as possibly contending for the spot of the greatest tennis player of all time if one uses this ranking method. He has also held a #1 ranking in two age divisions at the same time, several times in his ITF career. John was ranked as the world's number one singles player for 80 and over. Previous to this, in 75 and over, he held on to his #1 ranking despite the fact that he had had both knees replaced; one in 2007 and the other in 2008.

John Powless was featured in a 2016 tennis documentary Gold Balls, directed by Kate Dandel, and a 2023 documentary about super senior tennis players: Silver Servers directed by Dan Lobb.

== Awards ==
In addition to induction into the Murray State University Hall of Fame (1957), Powless is a member of the University of Wisconsin Athletics Hall of Fame (2002) as well as the State of Wisconsin Athletic Hall of Fame (2009). He was a 2000 inductee into the USTA/Midwest Tennis Hall of Fame. He was an honorary member of 22 different nations’ tennis associations and was named U.S. “Senior Tennis Player of the Millennium” in 1999. He was elected to the Wisconsin Athletic Hall of Fame in 2009.

The Professional Tennis Registry's Senior Player of the Decade award.(2010, Hilton Head, S.C.)

Team USA Captain Emeritus (for the Gordon Trophy, 2013)

Dubla Cup Champion 1981 (Seniors 'Davis Cup'- U.S.A. team member, Buenos Aires, Argentina)

== Head coaching record ==
Record table
Season	Team	Overall	Conference	Standing	Postseason
Wisconsin Badgers (Big Ten Conference) (1968–1976)
1968–69	Wisconsin	11–13	5–9	T–8th	
1969–70	Wisconsin	10–14	5–9	T–6th	
1970–71	Wisconsin	9–15	4–10	T–7th	
1971–72	Wisconsin	13–11	6–8	T–5th	
1972–73	Wisconsin	11–13	5–9	9th	
1973–74	Wisconsin	16–8	8–6	T–4th	
1974–75	Wisconsin	8–18	5–13	8th	
1975–76	Wisconsin	10–16	4–14	9th	
Wisconsin:		88–108	42–78		
Total:		88–108			
