= Bob Siska =

American tennis player and motorsport driver (born 1942)

- Full name: Robert Siska
- Country (sports): United States
- Born: December 1, 1942 (age 83)

Grand Slam singles results
- Wimbledon: 2R (1963)
- US Open: 3R (1959)

Robert Siska (born December 1, 1942) is an American former tennis player and motorsport driver.

A left-handed player from San Francisco, Siska made the singles third round of the 1959 U.S. National Championships as a teenager and competed on the international tour through the 1960s. He featured in the Wimbledon singles main draw four times and won his first round match in 1963, over Ion Țiriac.

At the tournament now known as the Cincinnati Masters, he reached the round of 16 in singles in 1965.

Siska, who worked in real estate, financed his own career in motor racing after tennis. He competed in several seasons of the Atlantic Championship and later in the Formula Renault. His best race result in the Atlantic Championship was a tenth-place finish (from 35 cars) at Laguna Seca Raceway.
