= Reg Bennett (tennis) =

British tennis player

- Full name: Reginald D. Bennett
- Country (sports): United Kingdom
- Born: 18 August 1937 (age 88)

Singles
- Career titles: 4

Grand Slam singles results
- Australian Open: 2R (1955)
- Wimbledon: 2R (1961)
- US Open: 2R (1959, 1960)

Reginald D. Bennett (born 18 August 1937) is a former British tennis player.

Bennett was raised in the town of Bexhill-on-Sea in Sussex. He won the singles titles at the Scottish Championships, South of England Championships and Harpenden Open in 1957.

In 1958, he won the Carmarthenshire Championships. In 1960 he was a finalist at the Western States Championships. He played collegiate tennis in the United States for Lamar Tech and was the 1959 NAIA singles champion.

One of his career best wins came over the American top 10 player Gil Shea in Manchester and he beat Gene Scott in the first round of the 1961 Wimbledon Championships.
