= Crawford Henry =

American tennis player (1937–2026)

- Full name: Crawford Irwin Henry
- Country (sports): United States
- Born: May 30, 1937 Atlanta, Georgia, U.S.
- Died: May 18, 2026 (aged 88)
- Turned pro: 1959 (amateur from 1950)
- Retired: 1969
- Plays: Right-handed (1-handed backhand)

Singles
- Highest ranking: No. 18 (1961)

Grand Slam singles results
- Australian Open: NP
- French Open: 2R (1961)
- Wimbledon: 2R (1961)
- US Open: 4R (1961)

Crawford Irwin Henry (May 30, 1937 – May 18, 2026) was an American professional tennis player.

== Biography ==
A high school tennis star in Georgia, Henry won the high school championship as a Freshman, Sophomore, Junior, and Senior. He never lost a match in high school and won the National High School tournament in 1955. He went on to Tulane University where he was a two-time first-team All American in 1959 and 1960, and second-team All-American in 1957. He helped Tulane win the NCAA team title in 1959, and reach the finals in 1957. He paired with Ronald Holmberg to win NCAA doubles titles in 1957 and 1959.

Henry also reached the singles final of the tournament in Cincinnati in 1960, falling to Miguel Olvera of Ecuador. The same year he won the singles title at the Blue Gray Championships in Montgomery, Alabama. He also reached the doubles final in 1957.

He was enshrined into Tulane's Athletic Hall of Fame in 1983, as well as the ITA Collegiate Men's Tennis Hall of Fame in 2000. He also was the head tennis coach at North Carolina State University for 16 years. He also Coached Tennis at Emory University 1964–1967.

Henry played in Wimbledon twice in the early 1960s and reached the ranking of No. 10 in the U.S. and World No. 18. He also reached as high as U.S. No. 4 in doubles. In 1961, Henry defeated Roy Emerson who was ranked No. 1 in the world at the time.

Crawford Henry died on May 18, 2026, at the age of 88.
