= 1959 U.S. National Championships (tennis) =

- Date: August 16–23 (Note: Men's and women's doubles); September 4–13 (Note: Men's and women's singles and mixed doubles)
- Edition: 79th
- Category: Grand Slam (ILTF)
- Surface: Grass
- Location: Chestnut Hill, Massachusetts; Forest Hills, Queens, New York City; United States
- Venue: Longwood Cricket Club; West Side Tennis Club

Champions

Men's singles
- (Australia) Neale Fraser

Women's singles
- (Brazil) Maria Bueno

Men's doubles
- (Australia) Neale Fraser / (Australia) Roy Emerson

Women's doubles
- (United States) Jeanne Arth / (United States) Darlene Hard

Mixed doubles
- (United States) Margaret Osborne / (Australia) Neale Fraser
- U.S. National Championships

The 1959 U.S. National Championships (now known as the US Open) was a tennis tournament that took place on outdoor grass courts at two locations in the United States. The men's and women's singles as well as the mixed doubles were played from September 4 through September 13 at the West Side Tennis Club, Forest Hills in New York City, while the men's and women's doubles were held at the Longwood Cricket Club in Chestnut Hill, Massachusetts from August 16 though August 23, 1959. It was the 79th staging of the U.S. National Championships, and the fourth Grand Slam tennis event of the year. Neale Fraser and Maria Bueno won the singles titles.

== Finals ==
=== Men's singles ===
(Australia) Neale Fraser (AUS) defeated (United States) Alex Olmedo (USA) 6–3, 5–7, 6–2, 6–4

=== Women's singles ===
(Brazil) Maria Bueno (BRA) defeated (United Kingdom) Christine Truman (UK) 6–1, 6–4

=== Men's doubles ===
(Australia) Neale Fraser (AUS) / (Australia) Roy Emerson (AUS) defeated (United States) Alex Olmedo (USA) / (United States) Earl Buchholz (USA) 3–6, 6–3, 5–7, 6–4, 7–5

=== Women's doubles ===
(United States) Jeanne Arth (USA) / (United States) Darlene Hard (USA) defeated (Brazil) Maria Bueno (BRA) / (United States) Sally Moore (USA) 6–2, 6–3

=== Mixed doubles ===
(United States) Margaret Osborne duPont (USA) / (Australia) Neale Fraser (AUS) defeated (United States) Janet Hopps (USA) / (Australia) Bob Mark (AUS) 7–5, 13–15, 6–2

== Notes ==
Preceded by 1959 Wimbledon Championships	Grand Slams	Succeeded by 1960 Australian Championships
