= Christopher Crawford (tennis) =

American tennis player

- Full name: Christopher Lee Crawford
- Country (sports): United States
- Born: July 31, 1939; Chicago, Illinois
- Died: November 15, 2012 (aged 73); San Antonio, Texas

Singles

Grand Slam singles results
- Australian Open: 3R (1959)
- Wimbledon: 4R (1961)
- US Open: 4R (1958, 1961)

Christopher Lee Crawford (31 July 1939 – 15 November 2012) was an American tennis player.

Chicago-born Crawford grew up in Piedmont, California, attending Piedmont High School and Menlo College.

An Orange Bowl champion in 1957, Crawford earned his first selection to the U.S. Davis Cup squad the following year, but didn't play in the team until a 1961 tie against the Caribbean In what would be his only Davis Cup appearance, he won both of his singles rubbers in straight sets. In 1961 he also had a notable performance at the Wimbledon Championships, where he beat the third-seeded Nicola Pietrangeli to make the round of 16.

Crawford, who played collegiate tennis for the University of Corpus Christi, is a member of the Texas Tennis Hall of Fame. He was living in Texas when he died of prostate cancer in 2012 at the age of 73.

== See also ==
- List of United States Davis Cup team representatives
