= Cliff Buchholz =

American tennis player

- Full name: Clifford Buchholz
- Country (sports): United States
- Born: May 28, 1943 (age 81)
- Plays: Right-handed

Singles

Grand Slam singles results
- Wimbledon: 1R (1963, 1964)
- US Open: 4R (1963)

Clifford Buchholz (born May 28, 1943) is an American former tennis player.

Raised in St. Louis, Missouri, Buchholz is the younger brother of tennis player Butch Buchholz. In 1961 he was beaten in the final of the U.S. national junior indoor championships by Arthur Ashe, who was also a St. Louis resident at the time. He made the fourth round of the 1963 U.S. National Championships and played collegiate tennis for the Trinity Tigers, where he earned All-American honors in 1965. Having left the tour to attend law school, he made a return in 1974 as a member of World Team Tennis franchise the Denver Racquets and they won the championship that year.

Buchholz later got involved in tournament management and along with his brother Butch founded the Lipton Championships (now Miami Open). He has operated several fitness centers across Colorado.
