= Neale Fraser =

Australian tennis player (1933–2024)

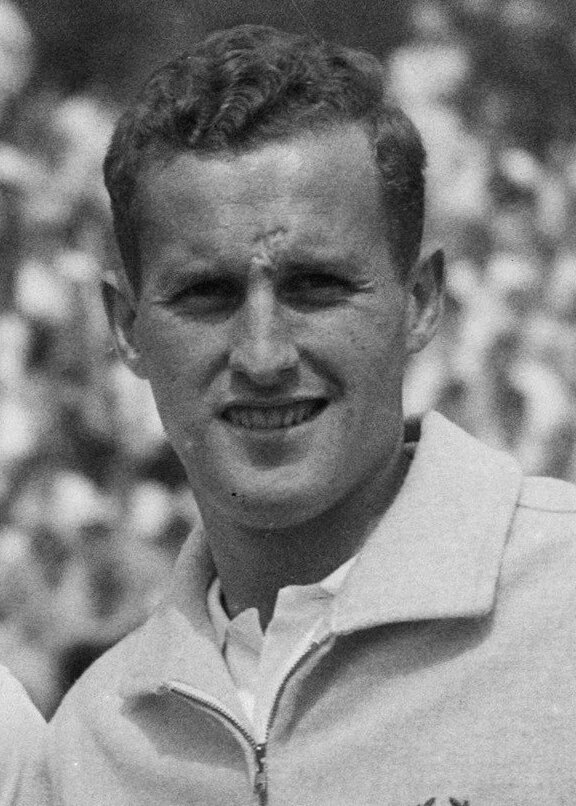
- Fraser in 1956
- Full name: Neale Andrew Fraser
- Country (sports): Australia
- Residence: Australia
- Born: 3 October 1933 Melbourne, Victoria, Australia
- Died: 2 December 2024 (aged 91) Australia
- Height: 6 ft 1 in (1.85 m)
- Retired: 1977
- Plays: Left-handed (one-handed backhand)
- Int. Tennis HoF: 1984 (member page)

Singles
- Career record: 697–227 (75.2%)
- Career titles: 37
- Highest ranking: No. 1 (1959, Lance Tingay)

Grand Slam singles results
- Australian Open: F (1957, 1959, 1960)
- French Open: SF (1959, 1962)
- Wimbledon: W (1960)
- US Open: W (1959, 1960)

Doubles
- Career record: 20–16
- Highest ranking: No. 1 (1959)

Grand Slam doubles results
- Australian Open: W (1957, 1958, 1962)
- French Open: W (1958, 1960, 1962)
- Wimbledon: W (1959, 1961)
- US Open: W (1957, 1959, 1960)

Mixed doubles

Grand Slam mixed doubles results
- Australian Open: W (1956)
- Wimbledon: W (1962)
- US Open: W (1958, 1959, 1960)

Team competitions
- Davis Cup: W (1959, 1960, 1961, 1962)

Neale Andrew Fraser, AO MBE (3 October 1933 – 2 December 2024) was an Australian champion tennis player. Fraser is the most recent man to have completed the triple crown (i.e. having won the singles, doubles, and mixed doubles titles at a Grand Slam tournament), which he did in 1959 and 1960 at the U.S. National Championships (now known as the US Open). He won the 1960 Wimbledon championships. Fraser was ranked world No. 1 amateur tennis player in 1959 and 1960 by Lance Tingay and Ned Potter.

After his playing days were over, he was the non-playing captain of Australia's Davis Cup team for a record 24 years.

== Biography ==
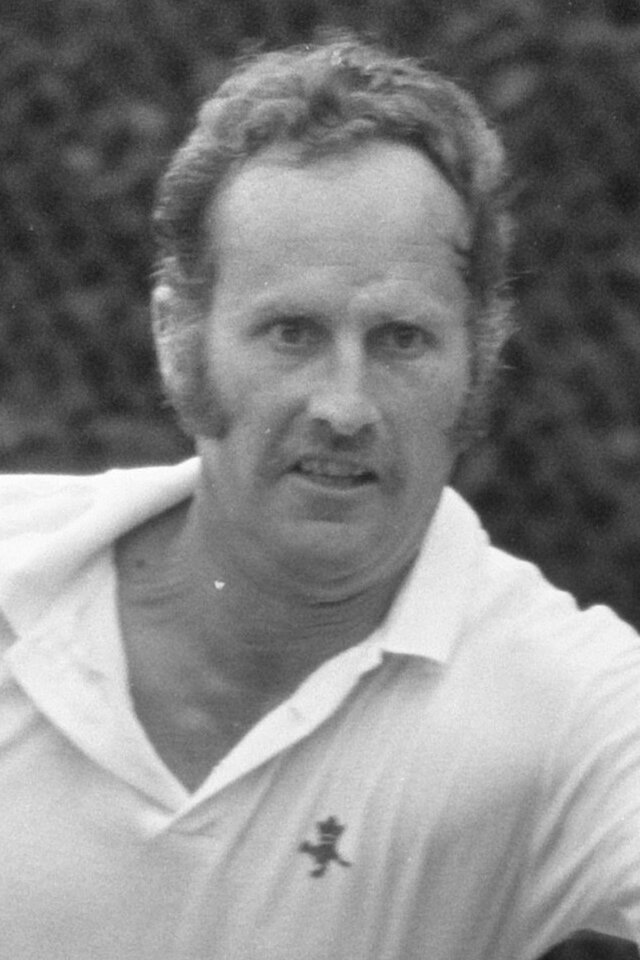
Fraser at the 1972 Dutch Open

Neale Fraser was the son of barrister and politician Archibald Fraser.

The young Fraser was taught by coach Bryan Slattery, and later won the Wimbledon singles in 1960 and the U.S. Championships singles in 1959 and 1960. He failed to win the Australian Championships, finishing as runner-up on three occasions (1957, 1959, and 1960) and held a championship point in the 1960 final. Team play – doubles and Davis Cup – proved nearest to Fraser's heart. In doubles, he took three Australian (1957, 1958, and 1962), French (1958, 1960, and 1962) and US (1957, 1959, and 1960) titles, and two Wimbledons (1959, and 1961) with three different partners: Ashley Cooper, Lew Hoad, and Roy Emerson.

Fraser was also successful in the mixed doubles, winning the Australian Championships in 1956 with Beryl Penrose, Wimbledon in 1962, and the U.S. Championships from 1958 to 1960 with Margaret Osborne duPont. He holds the distinction of having won the U.S. National (now Open) singles, doubles and mixed doubles titles in 1959 and then successfully defending those titles a year later. Since that time, no one has equalled that feat at a grand slam tournament, let alone successively.

Fraser was ranked the World No. 1 amateur in 1959 and 1960 by Lance Tingay of The Daily Telegraph, and was in the top 10 every year between 1956 and 1962.

Fraser became Davis Cup captain for the Australian team in 1970, holding the position for a record 24 years and piloting Australia to four wins in 1973, 1977, 1983, and 1986, and recording 55 wins from 75 ties played.

Fraser is one of the 20 men to win all four majors in doubles, and in 1984, he was elected into the International Tennis Hall of Fame.

Fraser was honoured with an MBE in 1974, and an AO in 1988. He was chairman of the Sport Australia Hall of Fame from 1997 until 2005. In 2008, he received the International Tennis Federation's highest honour: the Philippe Chatrier Award for outstanding achievements in tennis.

Fraser was also the centenary ambassador for the Davis Cup, and was the first recipient of the ITF and International Hall of Fame's Davis Cup Award of Excellence.

Neale Fraser was married with children and grandchildren. He was voted Victorian Father of the Year in 1974.

Fraser died on 2 December 2024, at the age of 91.

== Grand Slam finals ==
=== Singles: 7 (3 wins, 4 losses) ===
Result	Year	Championship	Surface	Opponent	Score
Loss	1957	Australian Championships	Grass	(Australia) Ashley Cooper	3–6, 11–9, 4–6, 2–6
Loss	1958	Wimbledon Championships	Grass	(Australia) Ashley Cooper	6–3, 3–6, 4–6, 11–13
Loss	1959	Australian Championships	Grass	(United States) Alex Olmedo	1–6, 2–6, 6–3, 3–6
Win	1959	US Championships	Grass	(United States) Alex Olmedo	6–3, 5–7, 6–2, 6–4
Loss	1960	Australian Championships	Grass	(Australia) Rod Laver	7–5, 6–3, 3–6, 6–8, 6–8
Win	1960	Wimbledon Championships	Grass	(Australia) Rod Laver	6–4, 3–6, 9–7, 7–5
Win	1960	US Championships	Grass	(Australia) Rod Laver	6–4, 6–4, 10–8

=== Doubles: 18 (11 wins, 7 losses) ===
Result	Year	Championship	Surface	Partner	Opponents	Score
Loss	1954	Australian Championships	Grass	(Australia) Clive Wilderspin	(Australia) Rex Hartwig (Australia) Mervyn Rose	3–6, 4–6, 2–6
Loss	1954	Wimbledon	Grass	(Australia) Ken Rosewall	(Australia) Rex Hartwig (Australia) Lew Hoad	5–7, 4–6, 3–6
Win	1957	Australian Championships	Grass	(Australia) Lew Hoad	(Australia) Mal Anderson (Australia) Ashley Cooper	6–3, 8–6, 6–4
Loss	1957	Wimbledon	Grass	(Australia) Lew Hoad	(United States) Budge Patty (United States) Gardnar Mulloy	10–8, 4–6, 4–6, 4–6
Win	1957	U.S. Championships	Grass	(Australia) Ashley Cooper	(United States) Gardnar Mulloy (United States) Budge Patty	4–6, 6–3, 9–7, 6–3
Win	1958	Australian Championships	Grass	(Australia) Ashley Cooper	(Australia) Roy Emerson (Australia) Bob Mark	7–5, 6–8, 3–6, 6–3, 7–5
Loss	1958	Wimbledon	Grass	(Australia) Ashley Cooper	(Sweden) Sven Davidson (Sweden) Ulf Schmidt	4–6, 4–6, 6–8
Win	1958	French Championships	Clay	(Australia) Ashley Cooper	(Australia) Robert Howe (South Africa) Abe Segal	3–6, 8–6, 6–3, 7–5
Loss	1959	French Championships	Clay	(Australia) Roy Emerson	(Italy) Nicola Pietrangeli (Italy) Orlando Sirola	3–6, 2–6, 12–14
Win	1959	Wimbledon	Grass	(Australia) Roy Emerson	(Australia) Rod Laver (Australia) Bob Mark	8–6, 6–3, 14–16, 9–7
Win	1959	U.S. Championships	Grass	(Australia) Roy Emerson	(United States) Earl Buchholz (United States) Alex Olmedo	3–6, 6–3, 5–7, 6–4, 7–5
Loss	1960	Australian Championships	Grass	(Australia) Roy Emerson	(Australia) Rod Laver (Australia) Bob Mark	6–1, 2–6, 4–6, 4–6
Win	1960	French Championships	Clay	(Australia) Roy Emerson	(Spain) Jose-Luis Arilla (Spain) Andrés Gimeno	6–2, 8–10, 7–5, 6–4
Win	1960	U.S. Championships	Grass	(Australia) Roy Emerson	(Australia) Rod Laver (Australia) Bob Mark	9–7, 6–2, 6–4
Win	1961	Wimbledon	Grass	(Australia) Roy Emerson	(Australia) Bob Hewitt (Australia) Fred Stolle	6–4, 6–8, 6–4, 6–8, 8–6
Win	1962	Australian Championships	Grass	(Australia) Roy Emerson	(Australia) Bob Hewitt (Australia) Fred Stolle	4–6, 4–6, 6–1, 6–4, 11–9
Win	1962	French Championships	Clay	(Australia) Roy Emerson	(West Germany) Wilhelm Bungert (West Germany) Christian Kuhnke	6–3, 6–4, 7–5
Loss	1973	Wimbledon	Grass	(Australia) John Cooper	(United States) Jimmy Connors (Romania) Ilie Năstase	6–3, 3–6, 4–6, 9–8, 1–6

=== Mixed doubles: 7 (5 titles, 2 runner-ups) ===
Result	Year	Championship	Surface	Partner	Opponents	Score
Win	1956	Australian Championships	Grass	(Australia) Beryl Penrose	(Australia) Mary Bevis Hawton (Australia) Roy Emerson	6–2, 6–4
Loss	1957	Wimbledon	Grass	(United States) Althea Gibson	(United States) Darlene Hard (Australia) Mervyn Rose	4–6, 5–7
Win	1958	U.S. Championships	Grass	(United States) Margaret Osborne	(Brazil) Maria Bueno (United States) Alex Olmedo	6–3, 3–6, 9–7
Loss	1959	Wimbledon	Grass	(Brazil) Maria Bueno	(United States) Darlene Hard (Australia) Rod Laver	4–6, 3–6
Win	1959	U.S. Championships	Grass	(United States) Margaret Osborne	(United States) Janet Hopps (Australia) Bob Mark	7–5, 13–15, 6–2
Win	1960	U.S. Championships	Grass	(United States) Margaret Osborne	(Brazil) Maria Bueno (Mexico) Antonio Palafox	6–3, 6–2
Win	1962	Wimbledon	Grass	(United States) Margaret Osborne	(United Kingdom) Ann Haydon-Jones (United States) Dennis Ralston	2–6, 6–3, 13–11

== Grand Slam performance timeline ==
Key
W	F	SF	QF	#R	RR	Q#	DNQ	A	NH

(W) winner; (F) finalist; (SF) semifinalist; (QF) quarterfinalist; (#R) rounds 4, 3, 2, 1; (RR) round-robin stage; (Q#) qualification round; (DNQ) did not qualify; (A) absent; (NH) not held; (SR) strike rate (events won / competed); (W–L) win–loss record.

=== Singles ===
Tournament	1952	1953	1954	1955	1956	1957	1958	1959	1960	1961	1962	1963	1964	1965	1966	1967	1968	1969	1970	1971	1972	1973	1974	1975	SR	W–L	Win %
Australian	3R	2R	2R	3R	SF	F	SF	F	F	A	SF	A	A	A	A	A	3R	A	A	A	3R	1R	1R	1R	0 / 15	29–15	65.9
French	A	A	3R	A	A	QF	QF	SF	QF	A	SF	A	A	2R	A	A	A	A	A	A	A	A	A	A	0 / 7	20–7	74.1
Wimbledon	A	A	2R	1R	QF	SF	F	QF	W	4R	SF	A	A	3R	A	A	A	A	A	A	1R	1R	2R	1R	1 / 14	38–13	74.5
U.S.	A	A	4R	4R	SF	3R	SF	W	W	A	A	A	A	A	A	A	A	A	A	A	A	A	A	A	2 / 7	32–5	86.5
Win–loss	1–1	1–1	7–4	4–3	12–3	14–4	17–4	18–3	21–2	3–1	13–3			3–2			2–1				2–2	0–2	1–2	0–2	3 / 43	119–40	74.8

== See also ==
- Davis Cup winning players
