= Paul Sullivan (tennis) =

American tennis player

- Full name: Paul W. Sullivan
- Country (sports): United States
- Born: April 17, 1941 (age 85)
- Died: 2024

Singles
- Career record: 4–15

Grand Slam singles results
- Wimbledon: Q3 (1968)
- US Open: 3R (1965)

Paul W. Sullivan (born April 17, 1941) is an American former professional tennis player.

== Tennis career ==
Sullivan was raised in Belmont, Massachusetts and captained Harvard University in varsity tennis.

Active on tour during the 1960s and 1970s, Sullivan ranked as high as 19th nationally and featured regularly at the US Open, reaching the singles third round in 1965.

In 1994 he was inducted into the USTA-New England Hall of Fame.

== Personal life ==
Sullivan married tennis player Jeannine Balbiers, whose father Ricardo was a Chilean Davis Cup player.
