= François Godbout =

Canadian lawyer and judge (born 1938)

- Country (sports): Canada
- Born: April 10, 1938 (age 87) Waterloo, Quebec, Canada
- Plays: Left-handed

Singles
- Career record: 69-84
- Career titles: 2

Grand Slam singles results
- Wimbledon: 2R (1964)
- US Open: 3R (1961)

Hon. François Godbout (born April 10, 1938) is a Canadian lawyer, judge, sports administrator and former tennis player.

A native of Waterloo, Quebec, Godbout made his debut for the Canada Davis Cup team in 1959 and came up against Rod Laver in his first rubber, losing in four sets.

Godbout won the Quebec Indoor championship in 1960, including a win against Henri Rochon.

He had a win over Arthur Ashe in his run to the third round of the 1961 U.S. National Championships, which was his best grand slam performance.

At the U.S. Clay Courts championships in 1962, he won against Dennis Ralston in the first round, but lost the second round match to Chuck McKinley, the eventual champion.

In March 1964, Godbout defeated Lester Sack in the semifinal of the Nice International Winter Championships, but the result of the projected final against Nicholas Kalogeropoulos was not reported.

After finishing his career he moved into tennis administration, serving stints as President of the Quebec Tennis Federation (1969 to 1971) and Tennis Canada (1985 to 1987). He was a 1994 inductee into Quebec Sports Hall of Fame.

== See also ==
- List of Canada Davis Cup team representatives
