= Butch Buchholz =

American tennis player (born 1940)

- Full name: Earl Henry Buchholz, Jr.
- Country (sports): United States
- Residence: Westport, Connecticut, US
- Born: September 16, 1940 (age 85) St. Louis, MO, US
- Height: 6 ft 2 in (1.88 m)
- Turned pro: 1961 (amateur from 1954)
- Retired: 1970
- Plays: Right-handed (one-handed backhand)
- Int. Tennis HoF: 2005 (member page)

Singles
- Career record: 115–90
- Highest ranking: No. 5 (1960, Lance Tingay)

Grand Slam singles results
- Australian Open: QF (1969)
- French Open: 2R (1969)
- Wimbledon: QF (1960, 1968)
- US Open: SF (1960)

Other tournaments
- Professional majors
- US Pro: W (1962)
- Wembley Pro: SF (1962, 1963, 1965)
- French Pro: SF (1965, 1966)

Doubles
- Career record: 14–15

Grand Slam doubles results
- Wimbledon: QF (1968)
- US Open: QF (1969)

Team competitions
- Davis Cup: F (1959)

Earl Henry "Butch" Buchholz, Jr. (born September 16, 1940) is a former professional tennis player from the United States who was one of the game's top players in the late 1950s and early 1960s.

== Tennis career ==
=== Juniors ===
Buchholz was an outstanding junior, winning all three of the Boys' Singles slam titles in a row during 1958–1959:

- French Open: (1958)
- Wimbledon: (1958)
- Australian Open: (1959)

Buchholz also won the U.S. National Boys’ 18 title in Kalamazoo, Michigan in 1958.

On February 10, 1959, he appeared as a mystery contestant on the television quiz show To Tell the Truth, where he was described as holding the “grand slam” of junior tennis titles in France, England, Australia and the United States.

=== Amateur/Pro Tour ===
Buchholz was ranked by Lance Tingay the world No. 5 amateur player in 1960 and ranked four times in the U.S. top 10. He played for the United States in the Davis Cup in 1959 and 1960. In the 1960 Wimbledon quarterfinal, Buchholz led Neale Fraser 2 sets to 1, and had match points in the fourth set, but Buchholz had started cramping and had to retire from the match when Fraser made it 15–15 in the fourth set. Fraser went on to win the 1960 Wimbledon title. Buchholz reached the semifinals of the U.S. Championships in 1960, losing to Rod Laver in five sets.

Buchholz turned professional in 1961. He won the United States Pro Championship in 1962, beating Pancho Segura in the finals. In 1963 he won the Japanese Pro Championships organized by Jack Kramer in Tokyo.

Buchholz was an original member of Lamar Hunt's Handsome Eight, a group of players signed by in 1968 for the newly formed professional World Championship Tennis.

== Retirement ==
Since retiring as a player, Buchholz has served tennis in many professional and administrative capacities. He has been the Commissioner of World Team Tennis from 1977 to 1978, an executive director of the Association of Tennis Professionals from 1981 to 1982, and member of the men's pro council from 1981 to 1983.

In 1985, Buchholz founded the Lipton International Players Championships (now known as the Miami Open), which is a leading event on both the men's and women's tours. One of the courts there is named after Buchholz.

Buchholz helped create Altenis, a management company which oversees tennis tournaments in Latin America. He also helped secure the continuation of the Orange Bowl International Tennis Tournament, a prominent international junior event in Florida. In 1992, Buchholz teamed with Arthur Ashe to found the Good Life Mentoring Program, benefiting hundreds of elementary and middle school children in the greater Miami area.

In 2005, Buchholz was inducted into the International Tennis Hall of Fame in Newport, Rhode Island.

== Singles performance timeline ==
Key
W	F	SF	QF	#R	RR	Q#	DNQ	A	NH

(W) winner; (F) finalist; (SF) semifinalist; (QF) quarterfinalist; (#R) rounds 4, 3, 2, 1; (RR) round-robin stage; (Q#) qualification round; (DNQ) did not qualify; (A) absent; (NH) not held; (SR) strike rate (events won / competed); (W–L) win–loss record.

	1956	1957	1958	1959	1960	1961	1962	1963	1964	1965	1966	1967	1968	1969	SR	W–L	Win %
Grand Slam tournaments															0 / 14	31–14	69
Australian Open	A	A	A	2R	A	A	A	A	A	A	A	A	A	QF	0 / 2	2–2	50
French Open	A	A	A	A	A	A	A	A	A	A	A	A	A	2R	0 / 1	1–1	50
Wimbledon	A	A	2R	3R	QF	A	A	A	A	A	A	A	QF	3R	0 / 5	13–5	72
US Open	1R	2R	3R	4R	SF	A	A	A	A	A	A	A	A	QF	0 / 6	15–6	71
Pro Slam tournaments															1 / 20	19–19	50
U.S. Pro	A	A	A	A	A	A	W	SF	QF	SF	SF	1R			1 / 6	6–5	55
French Pro	A	NH	A	A	A	1R	QF	QF	QF	SF	SF	QF			0 / 7	6–7	46
Wembley Pro	A	A	A	A	A	1R	SF	SF	QF	SF	QF	QF			0 / 7	7–7	50
Win–loss	0–1	1–1	3–2	5–3	9–2	0–2	5–2	4–3	3–3	3–3	2–3	2–3	4–1	9–4	1 / 34	50–33	60
