= Bill Bond (tennis) =

American tennis player (1942–2013)

- Full name: William Edward Bond
- Residence: La Jolla, California
- Born: June 22, 1942 San Diego, California
- Died: August 18, 2013 (aged 71) Redondo Beach, California
- College: USC

William Edward Bond (June 22, 1942 – August 18, 2013) was an American tennis player.

He entered high-level competition at an early age, reaching the second round of the 1958 U.S. National Championships. He continued to meet with success while attending the University of Southern California. He was a three-time All-American as part of a USC tennis team which won three consecutive NCAA Championships. In 1964, he and Dennis Ralston won the NCAA doubles title. William Kellogg, president of the La Jolla Beach and Tennis Club, later said "Bill was No. 7 in the all-time Boys' junior tennis rankings in Southern California (1960–1995). Other players ranked behind him included Jimmy Connors, Stan Smith, Michael Chang, Raúl Ramírez, and even Pete Sampras. Bill was a player!"

He was a member of the United States Junior Davis Cup team for three years, and of the United States Davis Cup team in 1963. He was ranked in the top 10 nationally as a singles player and played in 10 Grand Slam events.

Bond became the head teaching pro at the La Jolla Beach and Tennis Club and remained in the position for 34 years. His students included Terry Holladay, Alex O'Brien, Raúl Ramírez, and Chico Hagey. He and his father H. William Bond won the USTA National Father & Son Hard Court Championships five times.

Bill Bond retired in August 2005 and moved to Kauai with his wife Suzie. He died on August 18, 2013, at age 71.
