= Bob Mark =

Australian tennis player

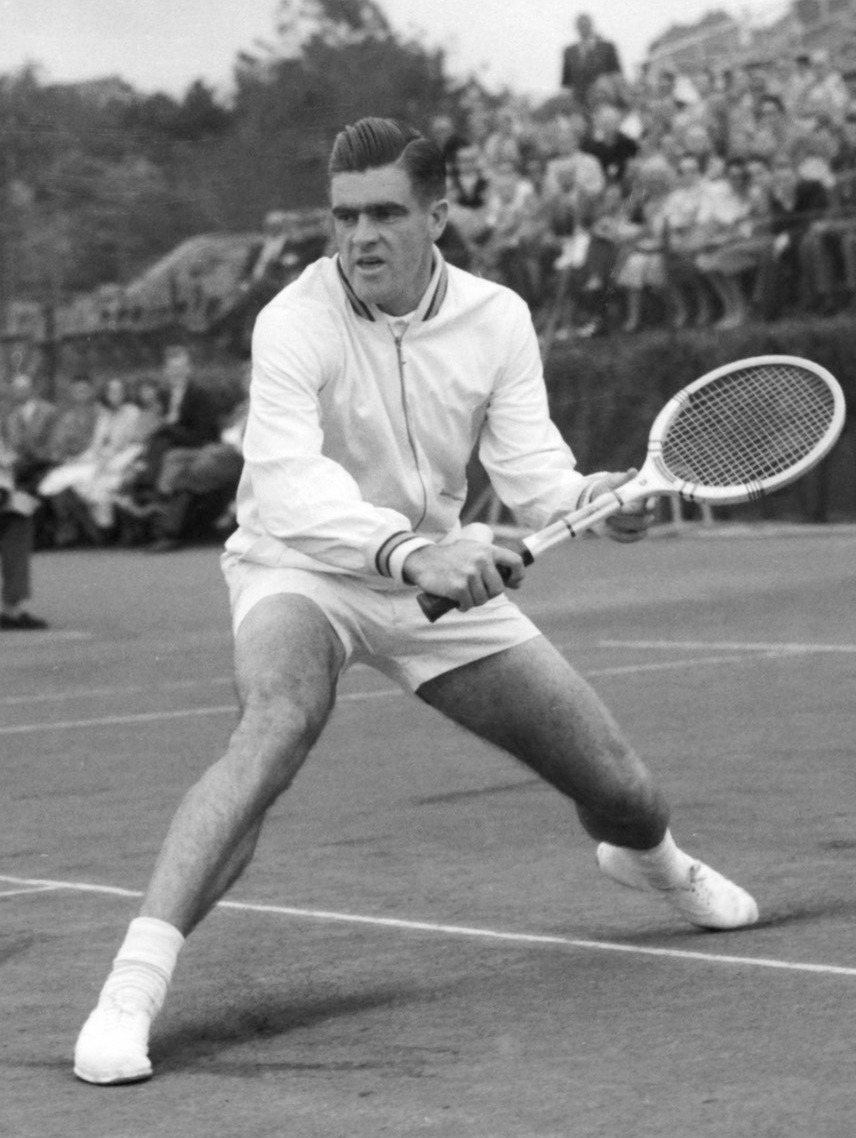
- Full name: Robert Ian Mark
- Country (sports): Australia
- Born: 28 November 1937 Albury, Australia
- Died: 21 July 2006 (aged 68) South Africa

Singles
- Highest ranking: 10

Grand Slam singles results
- Australian Open: SF (1959)
- French Open: 3R (1958)
- Wimbledon: 3R (1958, 1960)
- US Open: QF (1960)

Grand Slam doubles results
- Australian Open: W (1959, 1960, 1961)
- French Open: F (1961)
- Wimbledon: F (1959)
- US Open: F (1960)

Grand Slam mixed doubles results
- Australian Open: W (1959)
- Wimbledon: SF (1959, 1960)
- US Open: W (1961)

Robert 'Bob' Mark (28 November 1937 – 21 July 2006) was an amateur tennis player from Australia.

Mark won the Australian Men's Doubles title in 1959, 1960 and 1961 partnering Rod Laver. With Sandra Reynolds, he won the 1960 Australian Mixed Doubles, and in 1961, he teamed with compatriot Margaret Smith to win the U.S. National Championships Mixed Doubles.

At the 1959 Australian Championships, Mark beat Andrés Gimeno in four sets in the quarter finals. According to The Sydney Morning Herald, "Mark hit some wonderful passing shots, particularly off the forehand side. Frequently he ran around Gimeno's second service and clubbed it down the sideline for a winner". He lost to Neale Fraser in the semi finals. At the US Championships in 1960, Mark beat third seed Barry MacKay in five sets (having completed the fifth set of his previous round win earlier the same day). The big serving MacKay served many double faults, but Mark served well and his backhand was in form. He lost in the quarter finals to Dennis Ralston. In 1960 Mark won the Kent Championships at Beckenham beating Butch Buchholz in the final. In 1962, he won the singles title at the South African Championships after a four-set victory in the final against Gordon Forbes.

== Grand slam finals ==
=== Doubles (3 titles, 4 runner-ups) ===
Result	Year	Championship	Surface	Partner	Opponents	Score
Loss	1958	Australian Championships	Grass	(Australia) Roy Emerson	(Australia) Ashley Cooper (Australia) Neale Fraser	5–7, 8–6, 6–3, 3–6, 5–7
Win	1959	Australian Championships	Grass	(Australia) Rod Laver	(Australia) Don Candy (Australia) Bob Howe	9–7, 6–4, 6–2
Loss	1959	Wimbledon	Grass	(Australia) Rod Laver	(Australia) Roy Emerson (Australia) Neale Fraser	6–8, 3–6, 16–14, 7–9
Win	1960	Australian Championships	Grass	(Australia) Rod Laver	(Australia) Roy Emerson (Australia) Neale Fraser	1–6, 6–2, 6–4, 6–4
Loss	1960	US Championships	Grass	(Australia) Rod Laver	(Australia) Roy Emerson (Australia) Neale Fraser	7–9, 2–6, 4–6
Win	1961	Australian Championships	Grass	(Australia) Rod Laver	(Australia) Roy Emerson (Australia) Martin Mulligan	6–3, 7–5, 3–6, 9–11, 6–2
Loss	1961	French Championships	Clay	(Australia) Bob Howe	(Australia) Roy Emerson (Australia) Rod Laver	6–3, 1–6, 4–6

=== Mixed Doubles: (2 titles, 1 runner-ups) ===
Result	Year	Championship	Surface	Partner	Opponents	Score
Win	1959	Australian Championships	Grass	(South Africa) Sandra Reynolds	(South Africa) Renée Schuurman (Australia) Rod Laver	4–6, 13–11, 6–1
Loss	1959	U.S. Championships	Grass	(United States) Janet Hopps	(United States) Margaret Osborne (Australia) Neale Fraser	5–7, 15–13, 2–6
Win	1961	U.S. Championships	Grass	(Australia) Margaret Smith	(United States) Darlene Hard (United States) Dennis Ralston	default
