= Whitney Reed =

American tennis player

- Country (sports): United States
- Born: August 20, 1932; Oakland, California,
- Died: January 9, 2015 (aged 82); Alameda, California
- Plays: Right-handed

Singles
- Career record: 599-260
- Career titles: 51

Grand Slam singles results
- French Open: 3R (1962)
- Wimbledon: 3R (1962)
- US Open: QF (1961)

Doubles

Grand Slam doubles results
- Wimbledon: 2R (1962)

Mixed doubles

Grand Slam mixed doubles results
- Wimbledon: 3R (1961)

Team competitions
- Davis Cup: W (1958)

Whitney Reed (August 20, 1932 – January 9, 2015) was a U.S. No. 1 tennis player from the United States who was active in the 1950s and 1960s.

Reed was ranked No. 1 amateur in the United States in 1961 and was ranked in the U.S. amateur top ten in 1957 (No. 8), 1959 (No. 9), 1960 (No. 8), and 1962 (No. 6).

During his career, he had wins over Rod Laver, Roy Emerson, Neale Fraser, Chuck McKinley, Frank Sedgman, Manuel Santana, Gardnar Mulloy, Art Larsen, Donald Dell, and Alex Olmedo, all of whom have been enshrined in the International Tennis Hall of Fame.

In 1959, he was a 26-year-old junior at San Jose State University when he entered the 1959 NCAA Tennis Championships, held at Northwestern University in Evanston, Illinois. He finished the tournament with a win over Dell (of Yale University) to take the NCAA singles title.

A week later, he defeated Dell again to win the singles title at the Cincinnati Open. He also paired with Grant Golden to reach the doubles final in Cincinnati that week.

The following year he was runner-up to Larry Nagler of UCLA in their match for 1960 NCAA Tennis Singles Championship, held in Seattle, Washington.

In 1961 and 1963, he won the singles titles at the Canadian Open. In 1967 and 1969 he won the San Francisco City Championships.

He also was named three times to the United States Davis Cup squad: in 1958, 1961 and 1962.

Reed has been inducted in the San Jose State University and USTA Northern California Halls of Fame.
