= Tennis male players statistics =

This article is concerned with the major tennis achievements of tennis male players of all tennis history.

== Professional tennis before the Open Era ==
Before the start of the Open Era and in addition to numerous small tournaments and head-to-head tours between the leading professionals, there were a few major professional tournaments that stood out during different periods:

- Some survived sporadically because of financial collapses and others temporarily stood out when other important tournaments were not held:
  - Bristol Cup (held on the Côte d'Azur (French Riviera) at Cannes or Menton or Beaulieu) from 1920 to 1932.
  - Queen's Club Pro in 1927 and 1928.
  - World Pro Championships in Berlin in 1932 and 1933.
  - International Pro Championship of Britain in Southport from 1935 to 1939.
  - U.S Pro Hardcourt in Los Angeles, California in 1945 (the only significant professional tournament that year).
  - Philadelphia Pro 1950–1952.
  - Roland Garros Stadium Pro Round Robin in 1952.
  - Australian Pro in 1954.
  - Masters Pro Round Robin in Los Angeles in 1956, 1957, 1958 and 1959.
  - Tournament of Champions, held at Forest Hills 1957, 1958, 1959, and also held in Australia at White City (1957, 1959) and at Kooyong (1958).
  - Sydney Ampol Masters in 1958.
  - Qantas International Kooyong Professional at Kooyong Stadium in 1960 and 1962.
  - Madison Square Garden Pro in 1966 and 1967.
  - Forest Hills Pro in 1966.
  - Wimbledon Pro in 1967.
- There were a few team events modeled on the Davis Cup, such as the Bonnardel Cup from 1935 to 1937 and the Kramer Cup from 1961 to 1963.
- Three traditional "championship tournaments" survived into the Open Era, often having all the leading players but sometimes having very depleted fields.
  - The most prestigious of the three was generally the London Indoor Professional Championship. Played between 1934 and 1990 at Wembley Arena in England.
  - The oldest of the three was the United States Professional Championship, played between 1927 and 1999. From 1954 through 1962, this tournament was played indoors in Cleveland and was billed as the "World Professional Championships".
  - The third major tournament was the French Professional Championship, played usually at Roland Garros from 1930 through 1968 (not held in all years). The British and American championships continued into the Open Era but soon devolved to the status of minor tournaments.

However these three tournaments were considered retrospectively by some tennis experts as the three tournaments of the professional Grand Slam (until 1967). Some years as in 1948, only one of them was held, the U.S Pro in this case, and even in 1944 none was organized : this explains why professionals players sometimes have less major titles than those of the modern players but it doesn't mean that the banished players of the pre-Open Era were less great than their Open Era colleagues.

As with any statistics, those of tennis players should be put into the correct context because: a) they are mixing performances of the amateur circuit (until 1967), the professional circuit (until 1967), and the open circuit (since 1968). b) they don't always take into account the greatest events of a given year.

For instance, Ken Rosewall's amateur successes between 1953 and 1956 were achieved without having to compete against world-class professionals like Frank Sedgman and Pancho Gonzales. Likewise, when Rod Laver captured the amateur Grand Slam in 1962, he did not have to face opponents such as Rosewall, Lew Hoad, Pancho Segura and Andrés Gimeno, all professionals. In 1967 Laver won all the greatest pro tournaments that year, Wimbledon Pro (grass), the U.S. Pro (grass), Wembley Pro (indoor wood) and the French Pro (indoor wood). In the official statistics as published by the ITF or ATP, pro events before 1968 are not listed because only the amateur tournaments were taken into account.

== Most major singles titles ==
The three professional tournaments (Wembley Pro, French Pro, U.S. Pro) until 1967 are sometimes referred as the 'professional Grand Slam tournaments' by tennis historians, such as Robert Geist or Raymond Lee (in his Greatest Player of All time: A Statistical Analysis article). This list comprises winners of three types of titles; Amateur Era and Open Era majors (Australian, French, Wimbledon, and US championships), plus the three Amateur Era professional majors (French Pro, Wembley Pro, and US Pro).

- As of the 2025 US Open (active players in **boldface**).

Player	Total	Grand Slam tournaments (Note: Grand Slam tournaments of the Open Era are marked in bold font.)				Pro Slam tournaments		
Player	Total	Australian	French	Wimbledon	U.S.	French Pro	Wembley Pro	U.S. Pro
(Serbia) **Novak Djokovic**	24	**2008**, **2011**, **2012**, **2013**, **2015**, **2016**, **2019**, **2020**, **2021**, **2023**	**2016**, **2021**, **2023**	**2011**, **2014**, **2015**, **2018**, **2019**, **2021**, **2022**	**2011**, **2015**, **2018**, **2023**			
(Australia) Ken Rosewall (Note: Rosewall's wins at the Wembley Pro in 1968 and the U.S. Pro in 1971 are not included in the list of his "major" titles because those tournaments were not major events after the start of the Open Era in April 1968.)	23	1953, 1955, **1971**, **1972**	1953, **1968**		1956, **1970**	1958, 1960, 1961, 1962, 1963, 1964, 1965, 1966	1957, 1960, 1961, 1962, 1963	1963, 1965
(Spain) Rafael Nadal	22	**2009**, **2022**	**2005**, **2006**, **2007**, **2008**, **2010**, **2011**, **2012**, **2013**, **2014**, **2017**, **2018**, **2019**, **2020**, **2022**	**2008**, **2010**	**2010**, **2013**, **2017**, **2019**			
(Switzerland) Roger Federer	20	**2004**, **2006**, **2007**, **2010**, **2017**, **2018**	**2009**	**2003**, **2004**, **2005**, **2006**, **2007**, **2009**, **2012**, **2017**	**2004**, **2005**, **2006**, **2007**, **2008**			
(Australia) Rod Laver (Note: Laver's wins at the Wembley Pro in 1969 and 1970, the U.S. Pro in 1968 and 1969, and the French Pro in 1968 are not included in the list of his "major" titles because those tournaments were not major events after the start of the Open Era.)	19	1960, 1962, **1969**	1962, **1969**	1961, 1962, **1968**, **1969**	1962, **1969**	1967	1964, 1965, 1966, 1967	1964, 1966, 1967
(United States) Bill Tilden (Note: Tilden's total includes the World Hard Court Championships in 1921 (official clay court world championships). See ILTF World Championships winners.)	14			1920, 1921, 1930	1920, 1921, 1922, 1923, 1924, 1925, 1929	1934		1931, 1935
(United States) Pancho Gonzales	14				1948, 1949		1950, 1951, 1952, 1956	1953, 1954, 1955, 1956, 1957, 1958, 1959, 1961
(United States) Pete Sampras	14	**1994**, **1997**		**1993**, **1994**, **1995**, **1997**, **1998**, **1999**, **2000**	**1990**, **1993**, **1995**, **1996**, **2002**			
(Australia) Roy Emerson	12	1961, 1963, 1964, 1965, 1966, 1967	1963, 1967	1964, 1965	1961, 1964			
(France) Henri Cochet (Note: Cochet's total includes the World Hard Court Championships in 1922 and World Covered Court Championships in 1922 and 1923 (official wood court world championships). See ILTF World Championships winners.)	11		1926, 1928, 1930, 1932	1927, 1929	1928	1936		
(Sweden) Björn Borg	11		**1974**, **1975**, **1978**, **1979**, **1980**, **1981**	**1976**, **1977**, **1978**, **1979**, **1980**				
(United Kingdom) Fred Perry	10	1934	1935	1934, 1935, 1936	1933, 1934, 1936			1938, 1941
(United States) Don Budge	10	1938	1938	1937, 1938	1937, 1938	1939	1939	1940, 1942

Only players with 10+ Major titles listed.

=== Majors statistics ===
The draws of Pro majors were significantly smaller than the traditional Grand Slam tournaments; usually they only had 16 or even fewer professional players. Though they were the top players in the world, this meant only four rounds of play instead of the modern six or seven rounds of play.

Player	Slams	Pro	Era			Surface				Time Span			Win/Loss	Win %
Player	Slams	Pro	Amateur	Pro	Open	Grass	Clay	Hard	Indoor	Age	Span	Years	Win/Loss	Win %
(Serbia) **Novak Djokovic**	24	–	N/A		**24**	7	3	**14**	N/A	20–36	16	2008–2023	375–50	88.23
(Australia) Ken Rosewall	8	15	4	**15**	4	8	6	N/A	9	18–37	**20**	1953–1972	246–46	84.24
(Spain) Rafael Nadal	22	–	N/A		22	2	**14**	6	N/A	19–35	18	2005–2022	314–43	87.96
(Switzerland) Roger Federer	20	–	N/A		20	8	1	11	N/A	21–36	16	2003–2018	369–60	86.01
(Australia) Rod Laver	11	8	6	8	5	**12**	2	N/A	5	21–31	10	1960–1969	180–36	83.33
(United States) Bill Tilden	10	3	10 (+1) (Note: ILTF majors in parentheses. See ILTF World Championships winners.)	3	N/A	11	3	0	0	27–42	16	1920–1935	154–30	83.69
(United States) Pancho Gonzales	2	12	2	12	0	2	0	N/A	**12**	20–33	14	1948–1961	103–29	78.03
(United States) Pete Sampras	14	–	N/A		14	7	0	7	N/A	19–31	13	1990–2002	203–38	84.23
(Australia) Roy Emerson	12	–	**12**	N/A	0	10	2	N/A	N/A	24–30	7	1961–1967	174–39	81.69
(France) Henri Cochet	8	1	8 (+2)	1	N/A	3	5	0	3	20–34	15	1922–1936	113–20	84.96
(Sweden) Björn Borg	11	–	N/A		11	5	6	0	N/A	18–25	8	1974–1981	141–16	**89.81**
(United Kingdom) Fred Perry	8	2	8	2	N/A	7	2	0	1	24–32	9	1933–1941	120–22	84.51
(United States) Don Budge	6	4	6	4	N/A	6	3	0	1	22–27	6	1937–1942	95–18	84.07

== World Professional Championship tours winners ==
In the years before the Open Era, male professionals often played more frequently in tours than in tournaments because a head-to-head tour between two tennis stars was much more remunerative than a circuit of pro tournaments and the number of professional tournaments was small. For example, Fred Perry earned U.S. $91,000 in a 1937 North American tour against Ellsworth Vines but won only U.S. $450 for his 1938 victory at the U.S. Pro Tennis Championships. Vines probably never entered a tournament between the London Indoor Professional Championship in October 1935, which he won, and the May 1939 edition of that tournament, which he lost. In 1937, Vines played 70 matches on two tours and no matches in tournaments. Even in the 1950s, some professionals continued to play numerous tour matches. During his first five months as a professional (January through May 1957), Ken Rosewall played 76 matches on a tour against Pancho Gonzales.

The prevalence of head-to-head tours before 1959 and the small number of professional tournaments in many years makes it necessary to consider the tours when comparing male players from before the Open Era with male players during the Open Era. The following lists the pre-Open Era professionals who won the most world professional championship tours.

Winners World Professional Championship tours (1928–63)
Player	#	Years
(United States) Pancho Gonzales	7	1954, 56, 57, 58, 59, 60, 61
(United States) Ellsworth Vines	5	1934, 35, 36, 37, 38
(United States) Don Budge	4	1939 (Mar), 39 (May), 41, 42
(United States) Jack Kramer	4	1948, 50, 51, 53
(United States) Bill Tilden	3	1931, 32, 33
(Czech Republic) Karel Koželuh	1	1928
(United States) Bobby Riggs	1	1946
(Australia) Ken Rosewall	1	1963

== Professional tournament ranking series winners ==
After World War II, with an increasing number of prominent professional players, there were occasionally tournament series with point systems which created official rankings for the complete field of pros.

In 1946, there was a professional tournament series of 18 events in the U.S. under the organization of the P.P.A.T. (Professional Players Association of Tennis) linked by a points system won by Riggs, which he relied upon as evidence of his mastery of the entire pro field. In 1959, Kramer established a series of 15 tournaments in Australia, North America, and Europe linked by a points system which provided a full field ranking of all the contract professionals, plus a substantial money prize for the top finisher, with Hoad emerging as world No. 1. The 1959 tournament series was officially named the "Ampol Open Trophy", after the principal sponsor of the tournaments, the Ampol oil company, and the trophy awarded to the winner. In 1960, Kramer again established a tournament series with a points system, but both Gonzales and Hoad withdrew from the field and the final results are unknown.

In 1964, under Kramer's advice, the I.P.T.P.A. (International Professional Tennis Players Association) established a series of 17 tournaments in U.S. and Europe with a points system, and a world No. 1 and world champion was named as a result, Rosewall. This system continued in subsequent years, with Laver attaining the No. 1 ranking position for the 1965, 1966, and 1967 pro tournament series. The final points tables of these later tournament series were not published.

In 1968–69, the two professional tennis tours, the NTL and the WCT, each had a tournament series ranking list which contributed four players from each tour to a combined final 8-man tournament at the Madison Square Garden. Roche won the 1968 event, and Laver won the 1969 event.

In 1970, the ILTF authorized Kramer to arrange a year-end championship in which the pros with the highest tournament series points competed for the title of Grand Prix champion. This event was held in various locations and finally remained at Madison Square Garden from 1977 to 1989. In 1990, the ATP took over running the event and started awarding ranking points for the 8 qualifiers based on their results in the tournament. Currently, the championship is known as the "ATP Finals".

=== Professional tournament ranking series winners ===
Series	Player	Years
4	(Australia) Rod Laver	1965, 1966, 1967, 1969
1	(United States) Bobby Riggs	1946
1	(Australia) Lew Hoad	1959
1	(Australia) Ken Rosewall	1964
1	(Australia) Tony Roche	1968

== ILTF World Championships winners ==
- World Championships were played between 1912 and 1923.

Year	WGCC	WHCC	WCCC
1912	(New Zealand) Anthony Wilding	(Germany) Otto Froitzheim	tournament not created
1913	(New Zealand) Anthony Wilding (2/5)	(New Zealand) Anthony Wilding (3/5)	(New Zealand) Anthony Wilding (4/5)
1914	(Australia) Norman Brookes	(New Zealand) Anthony Wilding (5/5)	Not held due to World War I
1915	No competition due to World War I		
1916	No competition due to World War I		
1917	No competition due to World War I		
1918	No competition due to World War I		
1919	(Australia) Gerald Patterson	Not held	(France) Andre Gobert
1920	(United States) Bill Tilden	(France) William Laurentz	(United Kingdom) Gordon Lowe
1921	(United States) Bill Tilden (2/3)	(United States) Bill Tilden (3/3)	(France) William Laurentz
1922	(Australia) Gerald Patterson (2/2)	(France) Henri Cochet	(France) Henri Cochet (2/3)
1923	(United States) Bill Johnston	(United States) Bill Johnston (2/2)	(France) Henri Cochet (3/3)

== Year-end Championships winners ==
- Year-end Championships have been played since 1970.

Player	ATP Finals	WCT Finals	Slam Cup	Years
(Serbia) Novak Djokovic	7	N/A	N/A	2008–2023
(Switzerland) Roger Federer	6	N/A	N/A	2003–2011
(Czech Republic) Ivan Lendl	5	2	–	1981–1987
(United States) Pete Sampras	5	N/A	2	1991–1999
(Romania) Ilie Năstase	4	–	N/A	1971–1975
(United States) John McEnroe	3	5	–	1978–1989
(Germany) Boris Becker	3	1	1	1988–1996
(Sweden) Björn Borg	2	1	N/A	1976–1980
(United States) Jimmy Connors	1	2	N/A	1977–1980

Only players with 3+ YEC titles listed.

== Masters Series winners ==
- Masters Series has been played since 1990.

Player	Titles	Years
(Serbia) Novak Djokovic	40	2007–2023
(Spain) Rafael Nadal	36	2005–2021
(Switzerland) Roger Federer	28	2002–2019
(United States) Andre Agassi	17	1990–2004
(United Kingdom) Andy Murray	14	2008–2016
(United States) Pete Sampras	11	1992–2000

Only players with 10+ Masters titles listed.

== Most years a player was ranked No. 1 ==
Before 1912, contemporary rankings were national rankings.

- An undisputed number one player for the year (without another player regarded as co-number one) is shown in **bold**.

Total	World No. 1	Years
12 years	(United States) Pancho Gonzales	1948, 1949, 1952, 1953, **1954**, **1955**, **1956**, **1957**, **1958**, 1959, 1960, 1961
9 years	(Serbia) **Novak Djokovic**	**2011**, **2012**, 2013, **2014**, **2015**, **2018**, **2020**, **2021**, **2023**
9 years	(Australia) Rod Laver	1961, **1962**, 1964, **1965**, **1966**, **1967**, **1968**, **1969**, 1970
9 years	(United States) Bill Tilden	**1920**, **1921**, 1922, **1923**, **1924**, **1925**, **1931**, 1932, 1933
8 years	(United States) Jack Kramer	**1946**, **1947**, **1948**, 1949, 1950, 1951, 1952, 1953
8 years	(Australia) Ken Rosewall	1960, 1961, **1962**, **1963**, 1964, 1970, 1971, 1972
6 years	(United States) Pete Sampras	**1993**, **1994**, **1995**, **1996**, **1997**, **1998**
6 years	(Spain) Rafael Nadal	**2008**, **2010**, 2013, **2017**, **2019**, 2022
6 years	(United States) Ellsworth Vines	**1932**, 1934, **1935**, **1936**, 1937, **1938**
6 years	(United States) Jimmy Connors	**1974**, 1975, 1976, 1977, 1978, 1982
6 years	(United States) Don Budge	1937, **1938**, **1939**, **1940**, **1942**, (1945)
5 years	(Switzerland) Roger Federer	**2004**, **2005**, **2006**, **2007**, **2009**
5 years	(United Kingdom) Fred Perry	**1934**, **1935**, **1936**, 1937, **1941**
5 years	(United States) Bobby Riggs	**1939**, **1941**, **1946**, **1947**, 1949
5 years	(Czech Republic) Ivan Lendl	**1985**, **1986**, **1987**, 1989, 1990
5 years	(Sweden) Björn Borg	1976, 1977, 1978, **1979**, **1980**
4 years	(United States) John McEnroe	**1981**, 1982, **1983**, **1984**
4 years	(France) Henri Cochet	**1928**, 1929, 1930, **1931**
4 years	(Australia) John Newcombe	**1967**, 1970, 1971, 1973
4 years	(Australia) Frank Sedgman	1950, 1951, **1952**, 1953
3 years	(France) René Lacoste	**1926**, **1927**, 1929
3 years	(Australia) Norman Brookes	1907, **1912**, 1914
3 years	(Australia) Roy Emerson	1961, **1964**, 1965,
3 years	(Australia) Lew Hoad	1953, **1956**, 1959
3 years	(United States) Tony Trabert	1953, 1954, **1955**
3 years	(Ecuador) Pancho Segura	1950, 1951, 1952
2 years	(Spain) **Carlos Alcaraz**	2022, **2025**
2 years	(Australia) Ashley Cooper	**1957**, **1958**
2 years	(Australia) Neale Fraser	**1959**, **1960**
2 years	(Australia) Lleyton Hewitt	**2001**, **2002**
2 years	(Sweden) Stefan Edberg	1990, **1991**
2 years	(United States) Bill Johnston	1919, 1922
2 years	(United States) Maurice McLoughlin	1913, 1914
2 years	(Weimar Republic) (Nazi Germany) (West Germany) Hans Nüsslein	1933, 1934
2 years	(Ireland) James Cecil Parke	1913, 1914
2 years	(Spain) Manuel Santana	1965, 1966
2 years	(United States) Stan Smith	1971, 1972
2 years	(New Zealand) Anthony Wilding	1911, 1913
2 years	(United States) Frank Kovacs	(1945), 1951
1 year	(United States) Andre Agassi	**1999**
1 year	(United States) Jim Courier	**1992**
1 year	(Australia) Jack Crawford	**1933**
1 year	(Brazil) Gustavo Kuerten	**2000**
1 year	(United Kingdom) Andy Murray	**2016**
1 year	(United States) Andy Roddick	**2003**
1 year	(Sweden) Mats Wilander	**1988**
1 year	(United States) Arthur Ashe	1975
1 year	(Germany) Boris Becker	1989
1 year	(France) Jean Borotra	1930
1 year	(Czech Republic) Jaroslav Drobný	1954
1 year	(United States) Chuck McKinley	1963
1 year	(Romania) Ilie Năstase	1973
1 year	(United States) Rafael Osuna	1963
1 year	(United States) Frank Parker	1948
1 year	(Australia) Gerald Patterson	1919
1 year	(United States) Budge Patty	1950
1 year	(France) Martin Plaa	1932
1 year	(United States) Ted Schroeder	1949
1 year	(United States) Vic Seixas	1954
1 year	(Italy) **Jannik Sinner**	**2024**
1 year	(Australia) Fred Stolle	1966
1 year	(Argentina) Guillermo Vilas	1977

== See also ==
- List of Grand Slam tournaments champions
- List of Professional Majors champions
- List of World Championship Tours winners
- List of ATP Big Titles champions
- List of ATP Masters champions
- List of ATP Finals champions and WCT Finals champions
- World number 1 male tennis player rankings
- List of ATP number 1 ranked singles tennis players
