= Laver–Rosewall rivalry =

Famous tennis rivalry

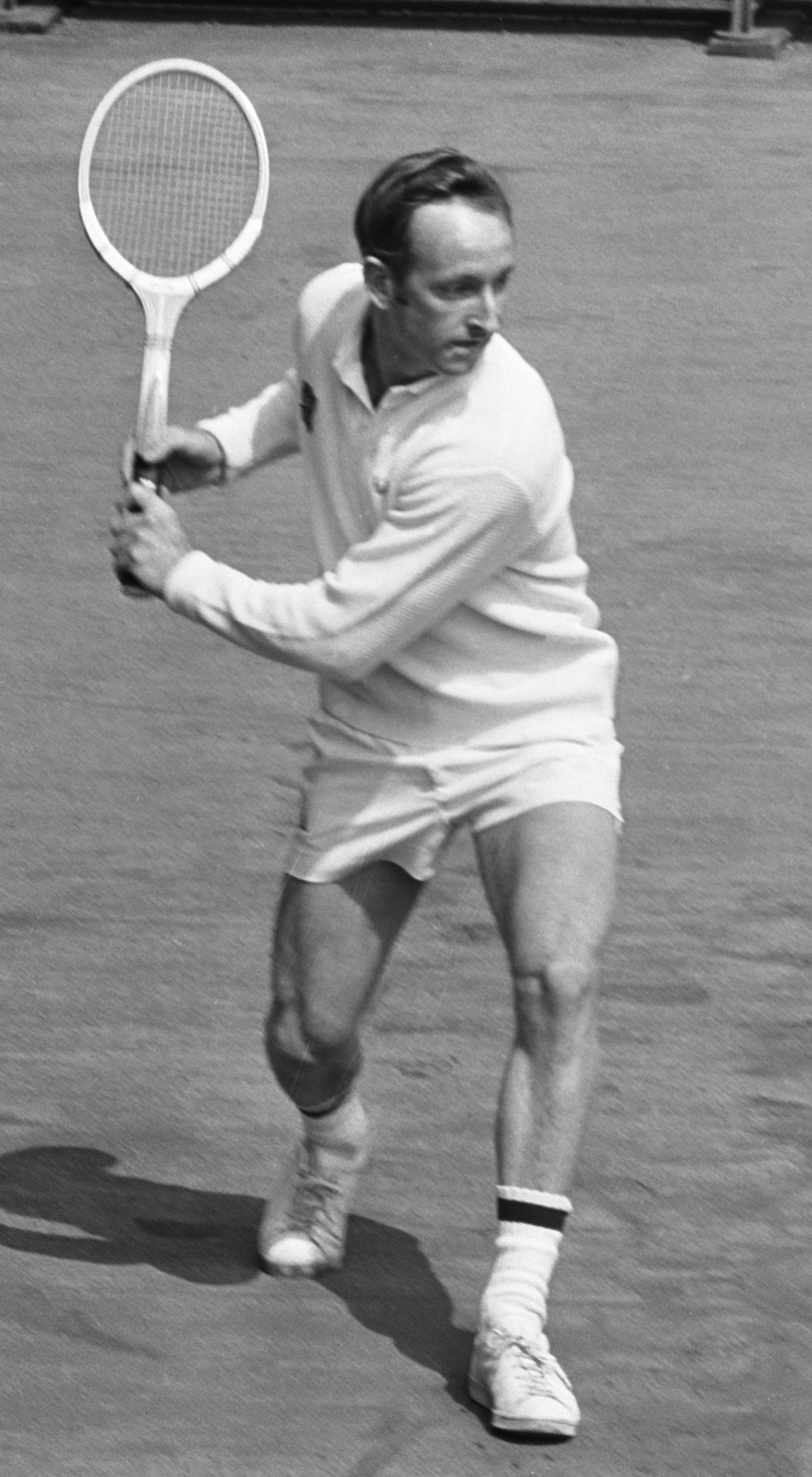
Rod Laver
* World No1
* 11 Grand Slam singles titles
* 8 Pro Major singles titles
* 200 singles titles

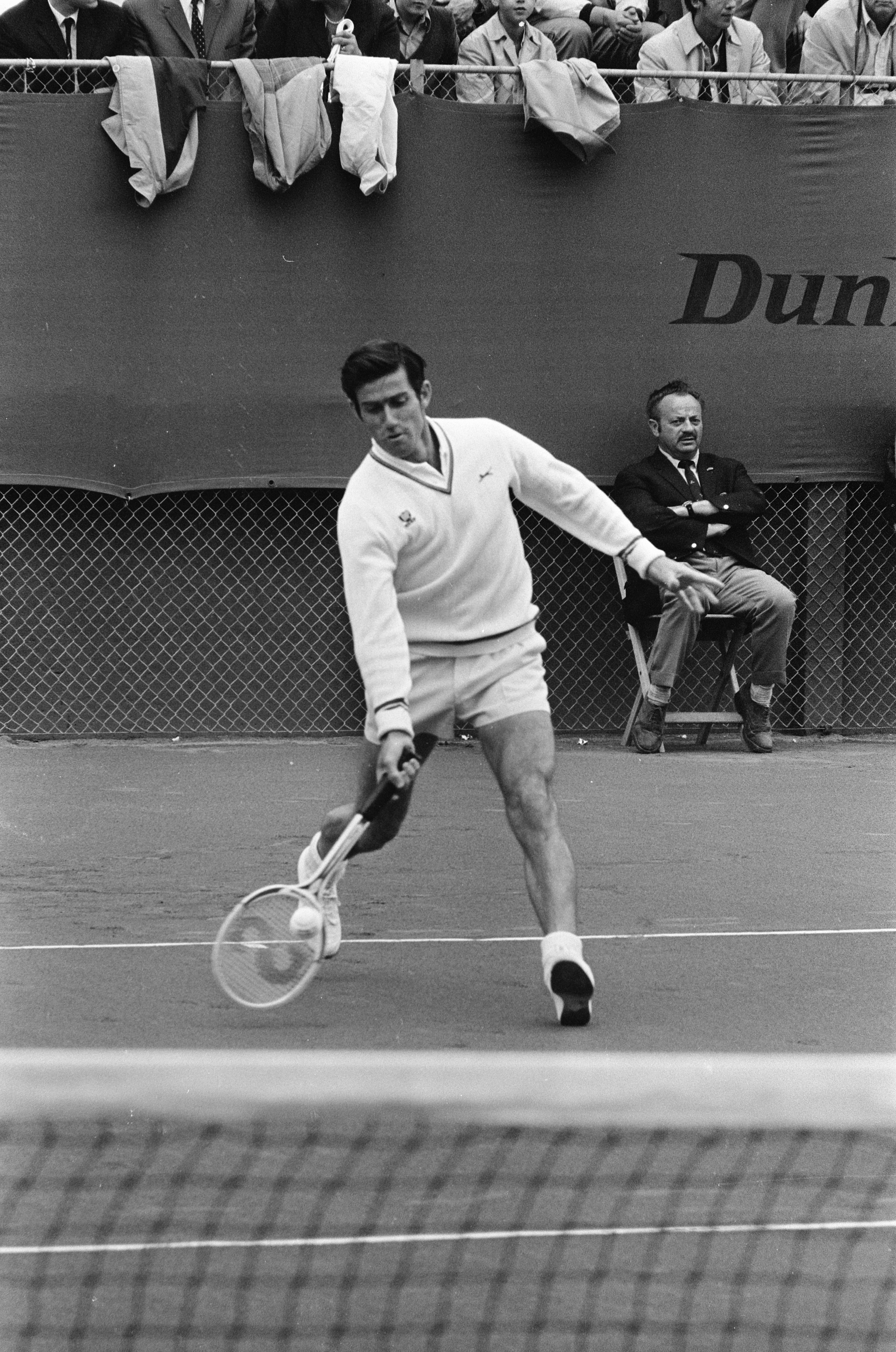
Ken Rosewall
* World No1
* 8 Grand Slam singles titles
* 15 Pro Major singles titles
* 133 singles titles

The Laver–Rosewall rivalry was a tennis rivalry in the 1960s and 1970s between Australian players Rod Laver and Ken Rosewall, widely regarded as two of the greatest tennis players of all time. In 1956 both players toured in the amateur circuit but never faced each other. Rosewall turned professional in January 1957 and the two did not meet until January 1963 when Laver turned pro. They played many times until 1977 when both semi-retired from the main tour.

== Analysis ==
Including tournaments and single-night events, they played at least 165 matches with Laver leading 90–75.

Their meetings took place in the span 1963–77. They met in 13 individual years in that span, and in 9 of those 13 Laver had an edge, which can be explained considering that Laver faced an already declining Rosewall: in their first meeting ever, Rosewall was already 28 years of age. (Note: Jack Kramer claimed in "Tennis de France N°174 Octobre 1967" that Rosewall's peak career was in 1961–1962.)

After their 1969 Roland Garros final, Laver said, "Ken has consistently been my toughest opponent, on any surface, and we've played each other, I don't know, well over 200 times."

=== Head-to-head tallies ===
Ken [Rosewall] pushed me around for about 20 years.

— Rod Laver, in 2012

The following is a breakdown of their documented head-to-head results:

Player	1963	1964	1965	1966	1967	1968	1969	1970	1971	1972	1973	1974	1975	1976	1977	Total
(Australia) Rod Laver	13	17	16	11	8	5	8	5	3	3	1	0	0	0	0	90
(Australia) Ken Rosewall	38	7	7	8	5	2	1	0	2	1	1	0	0	2	1	75

- All matches: Laver 90–75
- All finals: Laver 36–20
- Grand Slams: 1–1
- Pro Slams: Rosewall 6–5

=== Results per court surface ===
- Grass courts: Laver 18–13
- Hard courts: Laver 21–13 (18–12 on outdoor hard courts and 3–1 on indoor hard courts)
- Clay courts: Laver 13–11
- Indoor courts (carpet, wood, canvas – not including indoor hard courts and clay courts): Rosewall 39–34

== List of all matches ==
Legend:
Rod Laver wins
Ken Rosewall wins

No.	Winner	Win No.	Year	Date	Event	Round	Surface	Score
1.	Ken Rosewall	1.	1963	6 Jan	Australasian Tour – Sydney White City	Tour	Grass	6–3, 6–3, 6–4
2.	Ken Rosewall	2.	1963	12 Jan	Australasian Tour – Brisbane Milton	Tour	Grass	3–6, 10–8, 6–2, 6–3
3.	Rod Laver	1.	1963	19 Jan	Australasian Tour – Melbourne	Tour	Grass	6–3, 3–6, 7–5, 6–2
4.	Ken Rosewall	3.	1963	20 Jan	Australasian Tour – Albury	Tour	Grass	4–6, 6–3, 6–0
5.	Ken Rosewall	4.	1963	21 Jan	Australasian Tour – Canberra	Tour	Clay	10–8, 6–3
6.	Rod Laver	2.	1963	25 Jan	Australasian Tour – Adelaide	Tour	Grass	6–1, 6–2, 6–2
7.	Ken Rosewall	5.	1963	28 Jan	Australasian Tour – Auckland	Tour	Grass	6–4, 6–4
8.	Ken Rosewall	6.	1963	29 or 30 Jan	Australasian Tour – Dunedin	Tour	Grass	10–8, 6–4
9.	Ken Rosewall	7.	1963	29 or 30 Jan	Australasian Tour – Napier	Tour	Wood (i)	6–1, 6–3
10.	Ken Rosewall	8.	1963	31 Jan	Australasian Tour – Palmerston North	Tour	Wood (i)	7–9, 6–3, 6–4 (Note: Fourth match on the NZ Tour. Two matches were played between Auckland and Palmerston North, two between Palmerston North and Hamilton.)
11.	Ken Rosewall	9.	1963	1 or 2 Feb	Australasian Tour – Masterton	Tour	Wood (i)	6–2, 6–3
12.	Ken Rosewall	10.	1963	1 or 2 Feb	Australasian Tour – Wellington	Tour	Grass	6–3, 6–3
13.	Ken Rosewall	11.	1963	3 Feb	Australasian Tour – Hamilton	Tour	Wood (i)	6–3, 7–5 (Note: Rosewall won 6–3, 7–5 or 6–3, 7–6. They may have played a final game to finish the set off.)
14.	Ken Rosewall	12.	1963	10 Feb	North America Tour (group phase) – New York	Tour	Canvas (i) *	12–10
15.	Ken Rosewall	13.	1963	14 Feb	North America Tour (group phase) – College Park (MD)	Tour	Canvas (i) *	8–5
16.	Ken Rosewall	14.	1963	17 Feb	North America Tour (group phase) – Baltimore (MD)	Tour	Canvas (i) *	8–4
17.	Ken Rosewall	15.	1963	22 Feb	North America Tour (group phase) – Montreal, Canada	Tour	Canvas (i) *	8–6
18.	Ken Rosewall	16.	1963	29 Mar	North America Tour (group phase) – Kansas City	Tour	Canvas (i) *	12–10
19.	Rod Laver	3.	1963	1 Apr	Cleveland Tournament	3rd place	Canvas (i)	9–7
20.	Rod Laver	4.	1963	7 Apr	North America Tour (group phase) – Louisville (KY)	Tour	Canvas (i) *	8–3
21.	Rod Laver	5.	1963	10 Apr	North America Tour (group phase) – Wheaton (IL)	Tour	Canvas (i) *	8–6
22.	Rod Laver	6.	1963	14 Apr	North America Tour (group phase) – Hamilton, Bermuda	Tour	Clay	10–8
23.	Rod Laver	7.	1963	25 Apr	North America Tour (play-off phase) – San Francisco	Tour	Canvas (i) *	3–6, 6–3, 6–4
24.	Ken Rosewall	17.	1963	26 Apr	North America Tour (play-off phase) – Los Angeles	Tour	Canvas (i) *	10–8, 7–5
25.	Rod Laver	8.	1963	28 Apr	North America Tour (play-off phase) – Salt Lake City	Tour	Concrete (o)	6–4, 16–18, 6–4
26.	Ken Rosewall	18.	1963	29 Apr	North America Tour (play-off phase) – Denver	Tour	Canvas (i) *	6–3, 6–2
27.	Ken Rosewall	19.	1963	3 May	North America Tour (play-off phase) – Minneapolis	Tour	Canvas (i) *	6–3, 3–6, 6–1
28.	Rod Laver	9.	1963	5 May	North America Tour (play-off phase) – Chicago	Tour	Canvas (i) *	6–4, 7–5
29.	Ken Rosewall	20.	1963	7 May	North America Tour (play-off phase) – Muncie, Indiana	Tour	Canvas (i) *	6–2, 6–4
30.	Ken Rosewall	21.	1963	10 May	North America Tour (play-off phase) – Hershey (PA)	Tour	Canvas (i) *	7–5, 4–6, 9–7
31.	Ken Rosewall	22.	1963	11 May	North America Tour (play-off phase) – Cherry Hill (NJ)	Tour	Canvas (i) *	7–5, 6–2
32.	Ken Rosewall	23.	1963	12 May	North America Tour (play-off phase) – New Haven (CT)	Tour	Canvas (i) *	14–12, 9–7
33.	Rod Laver	10.	1963	16 May	North America Tour (play-off phase) – New York	Tour	Canvas (i) *	6–0, 6–3
34.	Ken Rosewall	24.	1963	17 May	North America Tour (play-off phase) – Corvallis (Oregon)	Tour	Canvas (i) *	10–8, 7–5
35.	Ken Rosewall	25.	1963	18 May	North America Tour (play-off phase) – Portland	Tour	Canvas (i) *	8–6, 6–2
36.	Ken Rosewall	26.	1963	20 May	North America Tour (play-off phase) – Medford (Oregon)	Tour	Canvas (i) *	6–1, 6–3
37.	Ken Rosewall	27.	1963	21 May	North America Tour (play-off phase) – Eugene (Oregon)	Tour	Canvas (i) *	6–2, 6–2
38.	Ken Rosewall	28.	1963	23 May	North America Tour (play-off phase) – Seattle	Tour	Canvas (i) *	6–2, 3–6, 6–3
39.	Ken Rosewall	29.	1963	24 May	North America Tour (play-off phase) – Vancouver	Tour	Canvas (i) *	6–3, 6–4
40.	Ken Rosewall	30.	1963	30 May	North America Tour (play-off phase) – Santa Barbara	Tour	Hard	6–2, 6–8, 6–3
41.	Ken Rosewall	31.	1963	Jun	TV series – Los Angeles	Tour	Hard	Rosewall's win ***
42.	Ken Rosewall	32.	1963	16 Jun	Los Angeles Pro	Final	Hard	14–12, 6–4, 6–3
43.	Ken Rosewall	33.	1963	Jun	TV series – Los Angeles	Tour	Hard	Rosewall's win ***
44.	Ken Rosewall	34.	1963	29 Jun	U.S. Pro – Forest Hills	Final	Grass	6–4, 6–2, 6–2
45.	Rod Laver	11.	1963	11 Aug	Kitzbühel Pro	Final	Clay	6–3, 6–4, 6–4
46.	Rod Laver	12.	1963	18 Aug	Cannes Pro	Final	Wood (i)	6–2, 6–3, 6–4
47.	Ken Rosewall	35.	1963	7 Sep	Dublin tour match	Tour	Grass	6–1, 6–4
48.	Ken Rosewall	36.	1963	15 Sep	French Pro – Paris Stade Coubertin	Final	Wood (i)	6–8, 6–4, 5–7, 6–3, 6–4
49.	Rod Laver	13.	1963	22 Sep	Brighton	Tour	Wood (i)	6–3, 6–4
50.	Ken Rosewall	37.	1963	30 Sep	Italian Pro – Rome	Final	Wood (i)	6–4, 6–3
51.	Ken Rosewall	38.	1963	3 Nov	Japan Pro – Osaka	Tour	Wood (i)	5–7, 6–2 6–4
52.	Rod Laver	14.	1964	5 Jan	Western Australian Pro – Perth (4-man tournament)	Round robin	Grass	6–2, 6–1
53.	Ken Rosewall	39.	1964	11 Jan	Melbourne Pro	Final	Grass	6–4, 6–4
54.	Ken Rosewall	40.	1964	1 Mar	New Zealand Tour – Hamilton East	Tour	Clay	5–7, 6–3, 6–1
55.	Rod Laver	15.	1964	3 Mar	New Zealand Tour – Gisborne	Tour	Wood (i)	6–2, 6–4
56.	Rod Laver	16.	1964	8 Mar	New Zealand Tour – Nelson	Tour	Grass	7–5, 6–2
57.	Rod Laver	17.	1964	13 Mar	New Zealand Tour – Invercargill	Tour	Hard (i)	6–3, 6–3
58.	Rod Laver	18.	1964	20 Jun	Monterey California Pro	Semifinal	Hard (o)	9–11, 6–3, 6-4
59.	Rod Laver	19.	1964	11 Jul	U.S. Pro – Brookline	Semifinal	Grass	6–3, 3–6, 6–3, 6–2
60.	Rod Laver	20.	1964	20 Jul	Nottingham (UK)	Tour	Wood (i)	6–2, 6–3
61.	Rod Laver	21.	1964	22 Jul	Knokke-le-Zoute Pro (4-man Tournament)	Semifinal	Clay	6–1, 6–1
62.	Rod Laver	22.	1964	25 Jul	Altrincham	Tour		6–2, 6–2
63.	Rod Laver	23.	1964	31 Aug	Zurich	Tour	Clay	2–6, 6–1, 6–3
64.	Rod Laver	24.	1964	1 Sep	Montreux	Tour	Clay	6–1, 6–3
65.	Ken Rosewall	41.	1964	13 Sep	French Pro – Paris Stade Coubertin	Final	Wood (i)	6–3, 7–5, 3–6, 6–3
66.	Rod Laver	25.	1964	19 Sep	Wembley Pro – London	Final	Wood (i)	7–5, 5–7, 4–6, 8–6, 8–6
67.	Ken Rosewall	42.	1964	21 Sep	Cardiff	Tour	Hard (i)	6–4, 6–3
68.	Ken Rosewall	43.	1964	22 Sep	Glasgow	Tour	Wood (i)	6–1
69.	Ken Rosewall	44.	1964	29 Sep	Rome	Tour	Wood (i)	6–3, 9–7
70.	Rod Laver	26.	1964	6 Oct	Faenza	Tour	Wood (i)	7–5, 6–4
71.	Rod Laver	27.	1964	8 Oct	Torino	Tour	Clay (i)	8–6, 6–2
72.	Rod Laver	28.	1964	20 Oct	Bloemfontein	Tour	Hard**	8–6, 6–4
73.	Rod Laver	29.	1964	27 Oct	East London	Tour	Hard	6–4, 3–6, 6–4
74.	Rod Laver	30.	1964	29 Oct	Durban	Tour	Hard	6–4, 9–7
75.	Ken Rosewall	45.	1964	31 Oct	Johannesburg – Ellis Park	Challenge	Hard (o)	6–4, 6–1, 6–4
76.	Ken Rosewall	46.	1965	16 Jan	Queensland Pro – Brisbane	Final	Grass	6–8, 6–2, 6–4
77.	Rod Laver	31.	1965	30 Jan	South Australian Pro – Adelaide	Final	Grass	6–3, 6–4
78.	Rod Laver	32.	1965	13 Feb	Victorian Pro – Melbourne	Final	Grass	2–6, 6–1, 6–4
79.	Rod Laver	33.	1965	5 Jun	Greater Seattle Pro	Semifinal	Hard	6–8, 15–13, 6–4
80.	Rod Laver	34.	1965	19 Jun	Lake Tahoe Pro	Semifinal	Hard	6–3, 3–6, 6–1
81.	Ken Rosewall	47.	1965	27 Jun	Greater Washington Pro – Reston	Final	Clay	8–6, 6–1
82.	Ken Rosewall	48.	1965	3 Jul	St Louis Pro	Semifinal	Clay	6–1, 6–4
83.	Ken Rosewall	49.	1965	5 Jul	US Tour – Cincinnati	Tour	Clay	10–8
84.	Rod Laver	35.	1965	10 Jul	Newport Pro	Round robin	Grass	31–21
85.	Rod Laver	36.	1965	12 Jul	Newport Pro	Play-off	Grass	31–28
86.	Ken Rosewall	50.	1965	19 Jul	U.S. Pro – Brookline	Final	Grass	6–4, 6–3, 6–3
87.	Ken Rosewall	51.	1965	12 Sep	French Pro – Paris Stade Coubertin	Final	Wood (i)	6–3, 6–2, 6–4
88.	Rod Laver	37.	1965	19 Sep	Brighton (UK)	Tour	Wood (i)	1–6, 6–2, 6–4
89.	Rod Laver	38.	1965	22 Sep	Stalybridge (UK)	Tour	Wood (i)	6–2, 4–6, 6–3
90.	Rod Laver	39.	1965	3 Oct	Varese, Italy	Tour	Wood (i)	3–6, 6–3, 6–4
91.	Rod Laver	40.	1965	4 Oct	Bologna	Tour	Wood (i)	6–3, 6–4
92.	Ken Rosewall	52.	1965	6 Oct	Torino	Tour	Clay (i)	9–7, 6–2
93.	Rod Laver	41.	1965	12 Oct	Nairobi Pro	Final	Clay	6–1, 4–6, 6–2
94.	Rod Laver	42.	1965	17 Oct	Rhodesian Pro – Bulawayo and Salisbury	Final	Hard	3–6, 6–4, 6–1
95.	Rod Laver	43.	1965	30 Oct	Natal Pro – Durban	Final	Hard	6–2, 8–6
96.	Rod Laver	44.	1965	29 Oct	East London	Tour	Hard	7–5, 6–4
97.	Rod Laver	45.	1965	3 Nov	Western Province Pro – Cape Town	Final	Hard	4–6, 6–3, 6–3
98.	Rod Laver	46.	1965	6 Nov	Johannesburg – Ellis Park	Challenge	Hard	5–7, 6–4, 6–2, 6–4
99.	Rod Laver	47.	1966	22 Jan	Victorian Pro – Melbourne	Final	Grass	6–3, 6–0
100.	Rod Laver	48.	1966	23 Jan	Warrnambool	Tour	Grass	6–2, 6–0
101.	Ken Rosewall	53.	1966	24 Jan	Shepparton	Tour	Grass	7–5, 9–7
102.	Rod Laver	49.	1966	29 Jan	Western Australian Pro – Perth	Final	Grass	6–2, 10–8
103.	Ken Rosewall	54.	1966	26 Mar	Madison Square Garden Pro – New York City	Final	Carpet (i)	6–3, 6–3
104.	Rod Laver	50.	1966	12 Jun	Forest Hills Pro	Round robin	Grass	31–20
105.	Rod Laver	51.	1966	12 Jun	Forest Hills Pro	Final	Grass	31–29
106.	Ken Rosewall	55.	1966	26 Jun	San Rafael Pro	Round robin	Hard	31–29
107.	Ken Rosewall	56.	1966	5 Jul	Cincinnati	Tour	Clay	8–5
108.	Rod Laver	52.	1966	5 Jul	Cincinnati	Tour	Clay	21–18
109.	Ken Rosewall	57.	1966	10 Jul	Newport Pro	Round robin	Grass	31–23
110.	Rod Laver	53.	1966	17 Jul	U.S. Pro – Brookline	Final	Grass	6–4, 4–6, 6–2, 8–10, 6–3
111.	Rod Laver	54.	1966	17 Sep	Wembley Pro – London	Final	Wood (i)	6–2, 6–2, 6–3
112.	Rod Laver	55.	1966	18 Sep	Port Talbot	Round robin	Indoor	Laver win
113.	Ken Rosewall	58.	1966	2 Oct	French Pro – Paris Stade Coubertin	Final	Wood (i)	6–3, 6–2, 14–12
114.	Ken Rosewall	59.	1966	20 Oct	Johannesburg Pro (Note: Not to be confused with: South African Pro – Johannesburg.)	Final	Hard	31–26
115.	Rod Laver	56.	1966	23 Oct	Western Province Pro – Cape Town	Final	Hard	5–7, 6–4, 7–5
116.	Ken Rosewall	60.	1966	24 Oct	Port Elizabeth	Tour	Hard	6–3, 7–5
117.	Rod Laver	57.	1966	28 Oct	Pretoria	Tour		8–6, 6–2
118.	Rod Laver	58.	1967	28 Mar	Boston Pro (Note: Not to be confused with: U.S. Pro.)	Final	Carpet (i)	6–4, 6–0
119.	Rod Laver	59.	1967	9 April	Paris Pro – Stade Coubertin (Note: Not to be confused with: French Pro.)	Final	Wood (i)	6–0, 10–8, 10–8
120.	Ken Rosewall	61.	1967	28 May	Los Angeles Pro	Final	Carpet	6–2, 2–6, 7–5 (Note: Tournament played on AstroTurf carpet surface on Center Court and on cement on the secondary court.)
121.	Ken Rosewall	62.	1967	4 Jun	Pacific Coast Pro – Berkeley	Final	Hard	4–6, 6–3, 8–6
122.	Rod Laver	60.	1967	10 Jun	Madison Square Garden Pro, New York City	Final	Carpet (i)	6–4, 6–4
123.	Ken Rosewall	63.	1967	25 Jun	Newport Beach Pro	Final	Hard	6–3, 6–3
124.	Rod Laver	61.	1967	3 Jul	World Pro – Oklahoma City	Final	Hard	6–2, 3–6, 6–4
125.	Rod Laver	62.	1967	23 Jul	Newport Pro	Round robin	Grass	31–20
126.	Rod Laver	63.	1967	28 Aug	Wimbledon Pro, England	Final	Grass	6–2, 6–2, 12–10
127.	Ken Rosewall	64.	1967	6 Sep	Transvaal Pro – Pretoria, Benoni and Klerksdorp	3rd place	Hard	6–3, 6–2
128.	Rod Laver	64.	1967	11 Sep	East London Pro	3rd place	Hard	8–5
129.	Ken Rosewall	65.	1967	24 Sep	Mbabane	Tour	Hard**	6–2, 8–6
130.	Rod Laver	65.	1967	28 Oct	Wembley Pro – London	Final	Wood (i)	2–6, 6–1, 1–6, 8–6, 6–2
131.	Rod Laver	66.	1968	17 April	BBC2 World Invitation Champs Pro – Wembley	Final	Wood (i)	6–3, 10–8
132.	Ken Rosewall	66.	1968	28 April	Bournemouth Open	Final	Clay	3–6, 6–2, 6–0, 6–3
133.	Rod Laver	67.	1968	7 May	NTL Wembley Invitation Pro	Final	Wood (i)	6–0, 6–1, 6–0
134.	Rod Laver	68.	1968	18 May	NTL Madison Square Garden Pro – New York City	Final	Carpet (i)	4–6, 6–3, 9–7, 6–4
135.	Ken Rosewall	67.	1968	9 Jun	French Open – Stade Roland Garros Paris	Final	Clay	6–3, 6–1, 2–6, 6–2
136.	Rod Laver	69.	1968	22 Sep	Pacific Southwest Open – Los Angeles	Final	Hard (i)	4–6, 6–0, 6–0 (Note: Last four days of the tournament held indoors at Los Angeles Sports Arena.)
137.	Rod Laver	70.	1968	10 Dec	Nashville – Dixie Tennis Classic	Final	Carpet (i)	6–2, 6–3
138.	Rod Laver	71.	1969	8 Feb	Philadelphia Open	Semifinal	Carpet (i)	6–4, 6–2
139.	Rod Laver	72.	1969	11 Feb	Orlando Pro	Final	Clay	6–3, 6–2
140.	Rod Laver	73.	1969	25 Feb	Oakland Pro	Semifinal	Carpet (i)	6–3, 6–3
141.	Rod Laver	74.	1969	21 May	BBC2 World Pro – Wembley	Final	Wood (i)	8–6, 6–0
142.	Rod Laver	75.	1969	24 May	Dutch Pro Champs – Amsterdam and Eindhoven	Round robin	Clay	6–2, 1–6, 6–3
143.	Rod Laver	76.	1969	8 Jun	French Open – Stade Roland Garros Paris	Final	Clay	6–4, 6–3, 6–4
144.	Rod Laver	77.	1969	14 Jul	U.S. Pro – Brookline	Semifinal	Hard	6–3, 5–7, 6–2, 6–3
145.	Rod Laver	78.	1969	17 Aug	Fort Worth Pro	Final	Hard	6–3, 6–2
146.	Ken Rosewall	68.	1969	17 Oct	Hamburg – One-night stand	Single match	Carpet (i)	0–6, 6–4, 8–6
147.	Rod Laver	79.	1970	22 Mar	Dunlop Sydney Open – White City	Final	Grass	3–6, 6–2, 3–6, 6–2, 6–3
148.	Rod Laver	80.	1970	1 Jun	St Louis WCT	Final	Carpet (i)	6–1, 6–4
149.	Rod Laver	81.	1970	16 Jul	Tennis Champions Classic Pro – New York City	Final	Carpet (i)	6–4, 6–3, 6–3
150.	Rod Laver	82.	1970	1 Aug	Louisville WCT	Semifinal	Clay	6–4, 1–6, 6–1
151.	Rod Laver	83.	1970	15 Dec	Masters, Tokyo	Round robin	Carpet (i)	5–6, 6–3, 6–5
152.	Rod Laver	84.	1971	2 Jan	Tennis Champions Classic Pro – New York		Carpet (i)	6–3, 6–2, 7–5
153.	Ken Rosewall	69.	1971	15 Jul	Washington WCT	Round of 16	Clay	5–7, 6–3, 6–1
154.	Rod Laver	85.	1971	1 Aug	Fort Worth WCT	Quarterfinal	Hard	7–5, 5–7, 6–2
155.	Rod Laver	86.	1971	3 Oct	Berkeley WCT	Final	Hard	6–4, 6–4, 7–6^{(7–3)}
156.	Ken Rosewall	70.	1971	18 Nov	WCT Finals, Houston and Dallas	Final	Carpet (i)	6–4, 1–6, 7–6^{(7–3)}, 7–6^{(7–4)}
157.	Rod Laver	87.	1972	13 Feb	U.S. Pro Indoor – Philadelphia WCT	Final	Carpet (i)	4–6, 6–2, 6–2, 6–2
158.	Rod Laver	88.	1972	20 Feb	Toronto WCT	Final	Carpet (i)	6–1, 6–4
159.	Rod Laver	89.	1972	9 April	Houston River Oaks WCT	Final	Clay	6–2, 6–4
160.	Ken Rosewall	71.	1972	14 May	WCT Finals, Dallas	Final	Carpet (i)	4–6, 6–0, 6–3, 6–7^{(3–7)}, 7–6^{(7–5)}
161.	Ken Rosewall	72.	1973	12 May	WCT Finals, Dallas	3rd place	Carpet (i)	6–3, 6–2
162.	Rod Laver	90.	1973	10 Nov	Australian Indoors, Sydney	Semifinal	Hard (i)	6–4, 3–6, 8–6
163.	Ken Rosewall	73.	1976	15 Feb	WCT Avis Challenge Cup	Round robin	Carpet	6–4, 6–1, 6–3 (Note: Tournament started on Supreme Court carpet surface. Because of extreme heat, they changed to plexipave hardcourt.)
164.	Ken Rosewall	74.	1976	8 April	Houston River Oaks WCT (first Tour)	Round of 16	Clay	3–6, 6–4, 6–3
165.	Ken Rosewall	75.	1977	4 Feb	Green Bay, Wisconsin	Tour	Carpet (i)	7–6, 7–5

(*) most probably canvas. During the World Tour in 63, they used their portable canvas surface.

(**) most probably hard, but not yet confirmed.

(***) Results of TV series matches were usually not reported in the press and it is not known whether videotapes of these matches still exist. Results are surmised from TV listings and the "winner keeps playing" format. For example, if Player 1 is listed facing Player 2 the first week and Player 1 is listed facing Player 3 the next week, it is assumed Player 1 had beaten Player 2. However, results are unconfirmed.

Other matches:

- 1964, 30 January – Brisbane tour match. Rain stopped match when Laver was ahead 4–6, 8–6, 1–0.
- 1965, 24 January – Manly Tour. Rain stopped match when Rosewall was ahead 6–2, 3–2.
- 1966, October–November – Tour in Nairobi, Entebbe, Accra and Lagos.
- 1967, August – Italian Tour, four cities with the pro troupe.
- 1967, October – Spain Tour with Laver, Rosewall, Gimeno and Stolle.

== See also ==
- List of tennis rivalries
- Gonzales–Rosewall rivalry

== Sources ==
- Joe McCauley, The History of Professional Tennis, London 2001
- World Tennis (The US Magazine)
- World of Tennis (Annuals edited by John Barrett)
- Tony Trabert in Tennis de France (French magazine)
- Association of Tennis Professionals (ATP) Laver – Rosewall head to head
