= Albert Matthews (disambiguation) =

Albert Edward Matthews (1873–1949) was Lieutenant Governor of Ontario.

Albert Matthews may also refer to:

- Albert Matthews (cricketer), Scottish cricketer
- Bruce Matthews (general) (Albert Bruce Matthews, 1909–1991)
- Edward Matthews (Australian soldier) (Albert Edward Matthews, 1896–1997)

== See also ==
- Paul Siogvolk (1820–1903), real name Albert Mathews, American author, lawyer and editor
- A. G. Mathews (Albert G. Mathews, 1872–1958), Democratic president of the West Virginia Senate
- Al Matthews (disambiguation)
