= HelpMe Feed Foundation =

Australian non-profitable organization that supports breastfeeding

HelpMe Feed
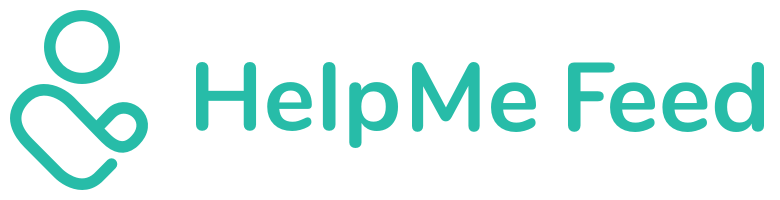
- Founded: 2018
- Founder: Madeline Sands
- Type: Nonprofit 501(c)(3)
- Headquarters: Sydney, Australia
- Region served: Australia, New Zealand, United States, Canada and United Kingdom
- Services: Maternal and infant health
- Website: helpmefeed.org

The HelpMe Feed Foundation is an Australian non-profitable organization that supports breastfeeding. The foundation created the HelpMe Feed app, which aims to facilitate and expand on the support offered by health professionals to parents.

== History ==
With a team of volunteers, the members of Small World Social shared the goal of managing the creation and distribution of the HelpMe Feed app globally. The group came together in 2014 when Maddy Sands of Small World Social saw an opportunity to use new technology to support women learning to breastfeed. Originally, the project began as the Google Glass breastfeeding app trial. This trial was supported by the Australian Breastfeeding Association.

Karina Ayers, RN IBCLC joined the HelpMe Feed Foundation in 2015. From there, the foundation turned its focus towards building the HelpMe Feed app: a subscription-based tool that scales the support offered by health professionals to breastfeeding mothers. It includes a library of breastfeeding support videos and resources.

== Aims ==
The HelpMe Feed Foundation aims:

- To reach health professionals and help them support more breastfeeding mothers.
- For parents to become more knowledgeable, skilled, and confident about breastfeeding.
- To decrease social stigma and raise public awareness around breastfeeding.

== Awards and recognition ==
In April 2019, HelpMe Feed was awarded a Platinum Hermes Creative Award. In May 2019, HelpMe Feed won an award of distinction in the Communicator Awards - Mobile Apps category.
