= Edward Matthews =

Edward Matthews may refer to:

- Edward Matthews (baritone) (1904–1954), opera singer
- Edward Matthews (soldier) (1896–1997), Australian soldier
- Edward Matthews (author) (1813–1892), Welsh Calvinistic Methodist minister and author
- Edward Bennett Mathews, American geologist

== See also ==
- Eddie Mathews (1931–2001), baseball player
- Ned Mathews (1918–2002), American football player
- Edward Mathew (1729–1805), British Army officer
