= Alexander Matthews =

Alexander Matthews may refer to:

- Al Matthews (actor) (Alexander Basil Matthews), American actor, singer, and radio personality

== See also ==
- Alex Matthews (Alexandra George Matthews), English rugby union player
- Al Matthews (disambiguation)
