= 1968 Pacific Southwest Open =

- Date: September 14– 22
- Edition: 42nd
- Category: NTL tour
- Draw: 64S / 32D
- Prize money: $30,000
- Surface: Hard / outdoor
- Location: Los Angeles, California, U.S.
- Venue: Los Angeles Tennis Club; Sports Arena

Champions

Men's singles
- (Australia) Rod Laver

Women's singles
- (United States) Rosie Casals

Men's doubles
- (Australia) Ken Rosewall / (Australia) Fred Stolle

Women's doubles
- (United Kingdom) Ann Jones / (France) Françoise Dürr
- Pacific Southwest Open

The 1968 Pacific Southwest Open was a combined men's and women's professional tennis tournament played on outdoor hardcourts at the Los Angeles Tennis Club in Los Angeles, California in the United States. It was the 42nd edition of the tournament, the first of the Open Era (Note: The US Open and the Pacific Southwest Open were the only tournaments in the United States in 1968 that were open to both amateur and professional players.), and ran from September 14 through September 22, 1968. Due to the anticipated increase in attendance the final four days of the tournament were played at the indoor Sports Arena. Rod Laver won the men's singles title and the $3,800 first prize while Rosie Casals won the women's singles title.

== Finals ==
=== Men's singles ===
(Australia) Rod Laver defeated (Australia) Ken Rosewall 4–6, 6–0, 6–0

=== Women's singles ===
(United States) Rosie Casals defeated (Brazil) Maria Bueno 6–3, 6–1

=== Men's doubles ===
(Australia) Ken Rosewall / (Australia) Fred Stolle defeated (South Africa) Cliff Drysdale / (United Kingdom) Roger Taylor 7–5, 6–1

=== Women's doubles ===
(United Kingdom) Ann Jones / (France) Françoise Dürr defeated (Australia) Margaret Court / (Brazil) Maria Bueno 6–3, 6–2

== See also ==
- Laver–Rosewall rivalry
