= National Living Treasure (Australia) =

Award for people of merit in Australia

National Living Treasure is a status created and occasionally updated by the National Trust of Australia's New South Wales branch, awarded to up to 100 living people. Recipients were selected by popular vote for having made outstanding contributions to Australian society in any field of human endeavour.

== History ==
In 1997, the National Trust of Australia (NSW) called for nominations from the public for 100 Australian Living Treasures, and each nomination was counted as one vote. The nominees had to be living and had to have made a substantial and enduring contribution. The choice of those who were named as National Living Treasures was made by more than 10,000 Australians voting. Their votes determined who was chosen. The first list of 100 Living Treasures was published in 1997, which included 12 Indigenous Australians. Phillip Adams, himself named as a National Treasure, gave his own opinion in an article on ANZAC Day in 2015 that when the list was first published in 1997, most were amused to find they were nominated; he suggested an alternative list to "celebrate those who make us happy".

In 2004, the list was refreshed with 15 new names, following the deaths of some people on the list and the exclusion of former Justice Marcus Einfeld, who was imprisoned after his retirement for perjury and perverting the course of justice relative to a speeding ticket, following an identical process to that used in 1997 – a public nomination and vote.

On 23 January 2012, the National Trust of Australia (NSW) joined with Woman's Day magazine to launch a nationwide search for seven new National Living Treasures. They were announced, amid controversy, on 4 March 2012, when the National Trust refused to endorse the NSW branch's listing of the mining magnate Clive Palmer as one of the members. Graeme Blackman, the chairman of the Australian Council of National Trusts, said that the list was not auspiced nationally by the National Trust. However, the next day it was reported that "trust president Ian Carroll said the titles recognised that the country's culture was more than just our buildings and natural heritage." It was later revealed that the vote for Palmer had been manipulated, with several internal emails having been sent to his company's staff, their family and friends, urging that they vote for "Professor Clive Palmer".

On 30 July 2014, the board of the National Trust of Australia (NSW) voted to remove Rolf Harris, who had been among the original 100 Australians selected for the honour in 1997, from the list, after his conviction on 12 charges of indecent assault between 1969 and 1986, and to also withdraw the award.

== Current list ==
The 65 still-living people on the 2014 list which originally contained 93 living people:

1. Phillip Adams, humanist, social commentator
2. John Bell, actor
3. Geoffrey Blainey, professor, historian
4. Raelene Boyle, Olympic runner, sports commentator
5. Frank Brennan, activist and priest
6. Bob Brown, politician, Australian Greens activist
7. Julian Burnside, barrister, refugee rights advocate, author
8. Tim Costello, social activist, commentator
9. Bill Crews, social activist
10. Russell Crowe, actor
11. Judy Davis, actress
12. Sir William Deane, High Court judge and Governor-General of Australia
13. Ernie Dingo, Indigenous Australian television personality
14. Mick Dodson, Indigenous Australian leader
15. Pat Dodson, Indigenous Australian activist/leader, politician
16. Peter Doherty, immunologist, professor, Nobel Prize winner
17. Herb Elliott, Olympic runner
18. John Farnham, entertainer
19. Dawn Fraser, Olympic swimmer, politician
20. Ian Frazer, scientist
21. Cathy Freeman, Indigenous Australian sportsperson, Olympic runner
22. Peter Garrett, politician, singer and social activist
23. Jennie George, Australian Council of Trade Unions leader, politician
24. Evonne Goolagong Cawley, Indigenous Australian tennis player
25. Shane Gould, Olympic swimmer
26. Germaine Greer, writer, social activist
27. John Hatton, independent NSW politician
28. Gabi Hollows, social activist, philanthropist
29. Janet Holmes à Court, business leader, philanthropist
30. John Howard, politician, Prime Minister
31. Barry Jones, politician, author, polymath
32. Paul Keating, Prime Minister
33. Thomas Keneally, writer
34. Cheryl Kernot, politician
35. Nicole Kidman, actress
36. Michael Kirby, lawyer, judge, social commentator
37. Karl Kruszelnicki, scientist, author, media personality
38. Rod Laver, tennis player
39. Garry McDonald, actor
40. Walter Mikac, survivors' advocate
41. Kylie Minogue, singer, actress
42. Graeme Murphy, dancer, choreographer
43. John Newcombe, tennis player, television commentator
44. Greg Norman, golfer, businessman
45. Sir Gustav Nossal, scientist, administrator
46. Pat O'Shane, magistrate, Indigenous Australian leader
47. Clive Palmer, mining magnate, placed on list after his staff were instructed to vote for him
48. Mary Paton, founder of the Nursing Mothers' Association
49. Noel Pearson, Indigenous Australian leader
50. Kieren Perkins, Olympic swimmer, television commentator
51. Pat Rafter, tennis player
52. Henry Reynolds, historian
53. Ken Rosewall, tennis player
54. Dick Smith, businessman, social commentator
55. Fiona Stanley, physician
56. Richard Tognetti, violinist and conductor
57. Anthony Warlow, singer
58. Gai Waterhouse, racehorse trainer
59. Steve Waugh, cricketer
60. Robyn Williams, science broadcaster
61. David Williamson, playwright
62. Tim Winton, novelist
63. Fiona Wood, physician
64. Roger Woodward, pianist
65. John Yu, medical doctor

== Deceased ==
- Betty Archdale, cricketer, educator (d. 2000)
- Faith Bandler, academic, activist and advocate (d. 2015)
- Dame Marie Bashir, psychiatrist, Governor of NSW (d. 2026)
- Nancy Bird Walton, aviator (d. 2009)
- Arthur Boyd, artist (d. 1999)
- Sir Jack Brabham, world champion Formula One driver (d. 2014)
- Sir Don Bradman, cricketer (d. 2001)
- Don Burrows, jazz musician (d. 2020)
- Harry Butler, naturalist and conservationist (d. 2015)
- Ruth Cracknell, theatre, film and television actress (d. 2002)
- Bart Cummings, racehorse trainer (d. 2015)
- Betty Cuthbert, Olympic runner (d. 2017)
- Sir Roden Cutler, World War II hero, Governor of New South Wales (d. 2002)
- Don Dunstan, Premier of South Australia, social commentator (d. 1999)
- Slim Dusty, singer, entertainer (d. 2003)
- Ted Egan, musician, activist, administrator (d. 2025)
- Malcolm Fraser, former Prime Minister of Australia (d. 2015)
- Margaret Fulton, writer, food expert (d. 2019)
- Catherine Hamlin, physician (d. 2020)
- Hazel Hawke, social activist (d. 2013)
- Basil Hetzel, medical researcher, public health advocate (d. 2017)
- Peter Hollingworth, Archbishop of Brisbane, Governor-General (d. 2026)
- Donald Horne, academic, writer, author of The Lucky Country (d. 2005)
- Robert Hughes, art critic, author (d. 2012)
- Barry Humphries, entertainer (d. 2023)
- Elizabeth Jolley, author (d. 2007)
- Caroline Jones, television personality, social commentator (d. 2022)
- Ian Kiernan, businessman, social activist (d. 2018)
- Dame Leonie Kramer, academic, businesswoman (d. 2016)
- John Landy, Olympic athlete, Governor of Victoria (d. 2022)
- Michael Leunig, cartoonist, social commentator (d. 2024)
- Jimmy Little, Indigenous Australian singer (d. 2012)
- Ted Mack, politician, social commentator (d. 2018)
- David Malouf, novelist (d. 2026)
- Edward (Ted) Matthews, World War I soldier and last Gallipoli survivor (d. 1997)
- Colleen McCullough, author, writer (d. 2015)
- Jack Mundey, trade union leader (d. 2020)
- Les Murray, poet (d. 2019)
- Dame Olivia Newton-John, singer, actress (d. 2022)
- Lowitja O'Donoghue, Indigenous Australian leader (d. 2024)
- Sir Mark Oliphant, physicist, Governor of South Australia (d. 2000)
- Margaret Olley, artist (d. 2011)
- Charles Perkins, Indigenous Australian leader (d. 2000)
- Peter Sculthorpe, musician, composer (d. 2014)
- Mum Shirl Smith, Indigenous Australian activist (d. 1998)
- Dame Joan Sutherland, opera singer (d. 2010)
- Mavis Taylor, humanitarian (d. 2007)
- Tom Uren, politician (d. 2015)
- Sir Alan Walker, social commentator/activist (d. 2003)
- Morris West, author (d. 1999)
- Gough Whitlam, former Prime Minister (d. 2014)
- Margaret Whitlam, social activist (d. 2012)
- R. M. Williams, businessman (d. 2003)
- Judith Wright, poet (d. 2000)
- Galarrwuy Yunupingu, Indigenous Australian leader (d. 2023)

== Removed while living ==
- Marcus Einfeld, former judge; removed 2008
- Rolf Harris, entertainer; removed 2014

== Related lists ==
- Western Australia's Department of Culture and the Arts has a list of State Living Treasures awarded in 1998, 2004, and 2015 to "honour influential elders of the artistic community", "acknowledge the ability of artists to engage, move, involve and entertain audiences. They honour the skill, imagination and originality of the artist" and "honour those artists whose lifetime work has enhanced the artistic and cultural life of Western Australia, providing inspiration for other artists and enriching the community."
