= Mary Paton =

Founder of the Australian Breastfeeding Association

Mary Paton AM
- Born: Natalie Mary Beecham; 1 October 1933 (age 93); Kew, Victoria, Australia
- Known for: Founding the Australian Breastfeeding Association
- Scientific career
- Fields: Occupational therapy

Natalie Mary Paton (née Beecham; born 1 October 1933) is an Australian occupational therapist and the founder of the Australian Breastfeeding Association (originally called the Nursing Mothers' Association, later the Nursing Mothers' Association of Australia).

== Biography ==
Mary Paton founded the Nursing Mothers' Association with five other mothers in Melbourne after having difficulty breastfeeding her first child. Doctors and nurses at the time were not trained to handle breastfeeding problems and with the modern nuclear family there were few older women to turn to for advice, so the founding members supported each other. This created the model for mother-to-mother support that continues today. The other founders were Glenise Francis, Pat Patterson, Jan Barry (a member of the Coles family), Pauline Pick and Sue Woods.

In 1981 she received an Advance Australia Award and in 1993 was Family Circle magazine's 'Woman of the Year.' She was awarded an Order of the General Division of the Order of Australia (OAM) in 1978.

In 2001, NMAA changed its name to Australian Breastfeeding Association and Paton was included in the Victorian Honour Roll of Women as part of the Centenary of Federation's Ordinary Woman: Extraordinary lives.

In March 2004 Paton became an Australian Living Treasure. On the 2006 Australia Day Honours list, Paton was awarded the higher honour of Member (AM) in the general division "for service to the community as the founder of the Nursing Mothers' Association of Australia, and to the development of policies, protocols, management, support and training methods to assist nursing mothers and their babies."
