= Alan Matthews =

Alan Matthews may refer to:

- Alan Matthews (Boy Meets World), a character on Boy Meets World
- Alan Matthews (cricketer) (1913–1996), English cricketer

== See also ==
- Alan Mathews (born 1965), Irish football manager
- Al Matthews (disambiguation)
