= Mavis Taylor =

Australian humanitarian

Mavis Taylor (1914 – 17 March 2007) was an Australian who was named an Australian Living Treasure for her humanitarian work for the people of East Timor in her later years.

== Life ==
Mrs Taylor was born in Richmond, Victoria in 1914 At 16 she moved to Yarrawonga in Victoria, Australia. In Yarrawonga, she married Thomas William Lloyd Taylor (born Yarrawonga 1913), raised 9 children, and established a clothesmaking and haberdashery business.

== Humanitarian work for East Timor ==
She started collecting and sending household items to East Timor after seeing violence during the difficult period of move to independence. By 2004 she had personally organised 21 shipping containers of practical aid, including stock from her own business and had set up 23 sewing centres providing employment for East Timorese with major funding she provided.

== Awards ==
Taylor was inducted onto the Victorian Honour Roll of Women in 2003.
