= Alfred Matthews =

Alfred Matthews may refer to:

- Alfred Matthews (footballer), English footballer who won the FA Cup with Blackburn Olympic in 1883
- Alf Matthews (1901–1985), British footballer
- Alf Matthews (boxer) (1938–1997), British boxer
- A. E. Matthews (Alfred Edward Matthews, 1869–1960), English actor

== See also ==
- Alfred Mathews (1864-1946), Welsh international rugby player
- Al Matthews (disambiguation)
