= Albert Matthews (cricketer) =

Scottish cricketer (born 1944)

Albert John Matthews (born 29 April 1944 in Inverness) is a Scottish former cricketer active from 1965 to 1968 who played for Leicestershire. He appeared in sixteen first-class matches as a righthanded batsman who bowled off breaks. He scored 167 runs with a highest score of 32 and took 24 wickets with a best performance of four for 87.
