= Al Matthews =

Al Matthews or Al Mathews may refer to:

- Al Matthews (actor) (1942–2018), British-based American actor
- Al Matthews (American football) (1947–2025), American football player
- Al Matthews, political candidate for Northumberland (Ontario electoral district)
- Al Mathews, investigator in 2011 Canadian federal election voter suppression scandal
- Al Matthews on WDBY

== See also ==
- Albert Matthews (disambiguation)
- Alfred Matthews (disambiguation)
- Alan Matthews (disambiguation)
