= Australian Breastfeeding Association =

The Australian Breastfeeding Association (ABA) is an Australian organisation interested in the promotion of breastfeeding and protection of nursing mothers. Members of ABA include nursing mothers and their partners as well as health professionals such as doctors, lactation consultants and midwives.

ABA was founded in Melbourne, Victoria in 1964 as the Nursing Mothers' Association, with the aim of giving mother-to-mother support to breastfeeding women. It is Australia's leading source of breastfeeding information and support.

The association is supported by health authorities and specialists in infant and child health and nutrition, including a panel of honorary advisers.

== History ==
Mary Paton founded the Nursing Mothers' Association with five other mothers in Melbourne after having difficulty breastfeeding her first child. There was a lack of support and accurate information about breastfeeding. Doctors and nurses at the time were not trained to handle breastfeeding problems and with the modern nuclear family there were few older women to turn to for advice, so the founding members supported each other, thus creating the model for mother-to-mother support than continues today. The other founders were Glenise Francis, Pat Patterson, Jan Barry (a member of the Coles family), Pauline Pick and Sue Woods.

The first meeting was held in Melbourne at Mary Paton's house on 13 February 1964 and the first newsletter was published later that year. Initially based primarily in Victoria, the ABA gradually spread to other states and territories with state representatives for the Australian Capital Territory, New South Wales, Queensland, Victoria, Western Australia appointed in 1969, the national headquarters set up in Hawthorn, Victoria in 1970, and groups established in South Australia and Tasmania in 1971. The ABA had over 10,000 members by 1973.

In 2001, NMAA changed its name to Australian Breastfeeding Association. As at 2016, over 350,000 people have been members.

== Services ==
The ABA has groups across Australia which hold discussion meetings for mothers. Breastfeeding education seminars are run for expectant parents; community education continues through all levels of education from pre-school to tertiary and members visits mothers in hospital to introduce the association and its services. ABA holds seminars and conferences for health professionals. The ABA is a registered training organisation and provides training in breastfeeding counselling and community education. On 20 March 2009, a national breastfeeding helpline was launched to improve on the previous state-level helplines. This helpline is staffed by volunteers who have completed the ABA's training.

In 2015 the ABA launched the Breastfeeding Friendly Environments program to provide support to mothers returning to work.

== Healthcare applications ==
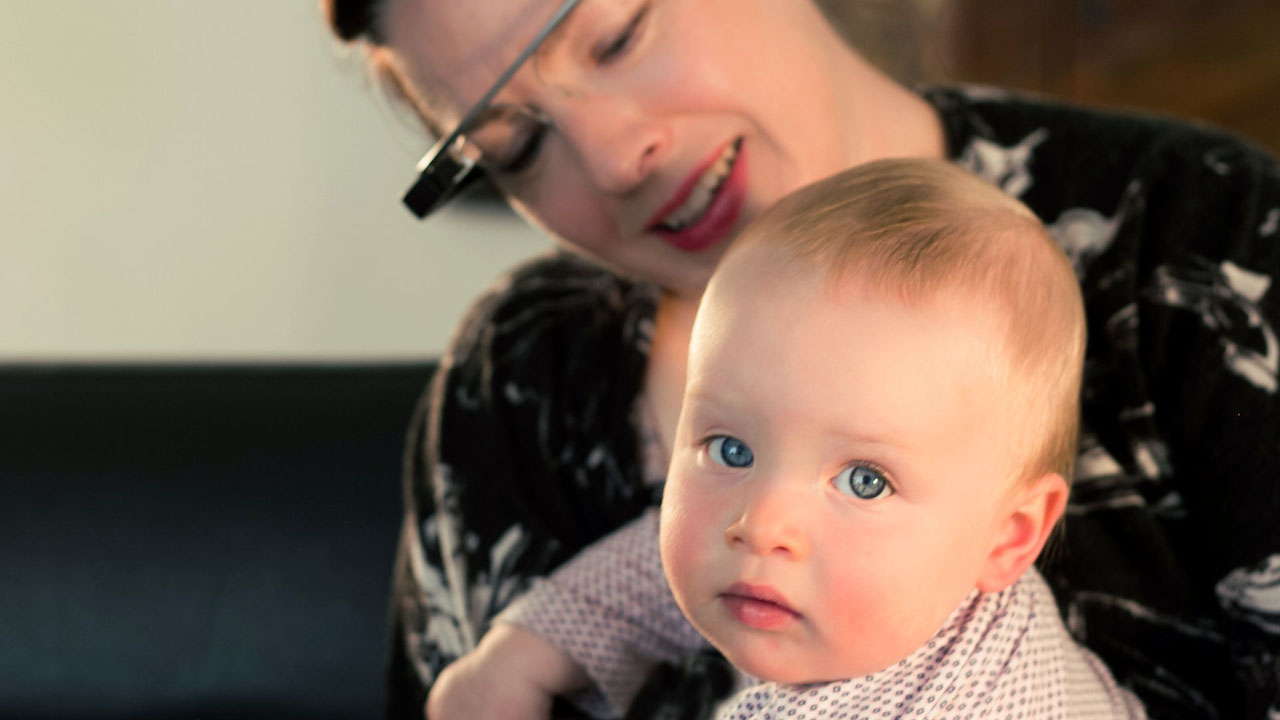
Baby Eve with Georgia for the Breastfeeding Support Project

In Australia, during January 2014, Melbourne tech startup Small World Social collaborated with the Australian Breastfeeding Association to create the first hands-free breastfeeding Google Glass application for new mothers. The application, named Google Glass Breastfeeding app trial, allows mothers to nurse their baby while viewing instructions about common breastfeeding issues (latching on, posture etc.) or call a lactation consultant via a secure Google Hangout, who can view the issue through the mother's Google Glass camera. The trial was successfully concluded in Melbourne in April 2014, and 100% of participants were breastfeeding confidently.

== Controversy ==
A Sunday Mail news story in August 2012 reported that during an Australian Breastfeeding Association class the undercover reporter was told a baby died "every 30 seconds" from formula and "Formula is a little bit like AIDS". The association launched an internal investigation soon afterwards and in a media statement on 29 August 2012 said the "comments reported in the media are not the view of the association and the counsellor involved has been stood down from all duties".
