= Australian Pro =

Defunct tennis tournament
- Founded: 1954
- Abolished: 1966
- Location: Adelaide, Melbourne, Perth, Sydney
- Surface: Grass / outdoor

The Australian Pro was a men's professional tennis tournament held in 1954. It was billed as the Australian Professional Championships. In many later years, separate pro events were held in various Australian state capitals. From 1957 to 1959 Tournament of Champions events were held in Australia (in 1957 and 1959 in Sydney and 1958 in Melbourne). The Ampol Masters was held in 1958 at White City, Sydney.

== Singles finals ==
=== Australian Pro ===
Year	Location	Champion	Runner-up	Score
1954	Perth	(Australia) Frank Sedgman	(Ecuador) Pancho Segura	5–7, 6–3, 6–4

=== Western Australia Pro ===
Year	Location	Champion	Runner-up	Score
1957	Perth	(United States) Tony Trabert	(Australia) Frank Sedgman	6–4, 6–3
1959	Perth	(Australia) Lew Hoad	(Australia) Ashley Cooper	6–1, 6–3
1964	Perth	(Australia) Rod Laver	(Australia) Ken Rosewall	(Round Robin)
1965	Perth	(Australia) Rod Laver	(United States) Pancho Gonzales	7–5, 11–9
1966	Perth	(Australia) Rod Laver	(Australia) Ken Rosewall	6–2, 10–8

=== South Australia Pro ===
Year	Location	Champion	Runner-up	Score
1959	Adelaide	(Australia) Lew Hoad	(Australia) Ken Rosewall	5–7, 7–5, 6–4
1962	Adelaide	(Australia) Ken Rosewall	(Spain) Andrés Gimeno	7–9, 6–3, 12–10, 6–4
1964	Adelaide	(Australia) Rod Laver	(Australia) Lew Hoad	7–5, 3–6, 6–0
1965	Adelaide	(Australia) Rod Laver	(Australia) Ken Rosewall	6–3, 6–4
1966	Adelaide	(Australia) Ken Rosewall	(France) Pierre Barthès	9–7, 3–6, 6–2

== See also ==
- Major professional tennis tournaments before the Open Era

== Sources ==
- McCauley, Joe (2000). The History of Professional Tennis. Windsor: The Short Run Book Company Limited.
