= Edward Matthews (soldier) =

Australian soldier

Albert Edward Matthews (11 November 1896 – 9 December 1997) was an Australian soldier and, at his death, the last living veteran of the Gallipoli landing from the First World War.

== Early life ==
Matthews was born in Leichhardt, an inner city suburb of Sydney, New South Wales, on 11 November 1896. A carpenter by trade, he was only 17 years of age when he enlisted to serve as an infantryman in the First World War. He became a signaler in the Australian 1st Infantry Brigade.

== First World War ==
Matthews took part in the first Anzac landing at Gallipoli on 25 April 1915 at what is now known as Anzac Cove. Early in the landing, Matthews was hit in the chest by a shrapnel shard. A thick pocket-book—a present from his mother—saved his life.

After the Gallipoli, Matthews went on to fight on the Western Front, where he took part in the Battle of Villers-Bretonneux. On his 22nd birthday, the same day as the cessation of hostilities on 11 November 1918, he was on a ship in the Indian Ocean on his way home on "ANZAC leave".

== Death ==
Matthews died in his sleep on 9 December 1997 at the age of 101. At his death, he was the last living veteran of the Gallipoli landing.

Matthews had been inducted to the Australian Living Treasures list in 1997. He made several public statements of the futility of wars. He regarded Anzac Day as "not for old diggers to remember, it's for survivors to warn the young about the dangers of romanticising war."

Matthews was given a state funeral in recognition of his war service and his special place in Australian history.
