= Wimbledon Pro =

Coordinates: 51°26′1.48″N 0°12′50.63″W

Wimbledon World Professional Championships
- Date: 25 – 28 August 1967
- Edition: 1st
- Draw: 8S / 4D
- Prize money: US$45,000
- Surface: Grass
- Location: Church Road; SW19, Wimbledon, London, United Kingdom
- Venue: All England Lawn Tennis and Croquet Club

Champions

Singles
- (Australia) Rod Laver

Doubles
- (United States) Pancho Gonzales / (Spain) Andrés Gimeno
Wimbledon Pro

The Wimbledon World Lawn Tennis Professional Championships, also known as the Wimbledon Pro, was a men's tennis tournament held in August 1967. The tournament was sponsored and broadcast by the BBC to mark the invention of colour television. It was the first tournament staged at Wimbledon that was open to male professional tennis players since the British Professional Championships in 1930, and had a prize fund of US$45,000. The singles competition was an eight-man knockout event won by Rod Laver, who received £3,000, whilst the doubles was a four team knockout event won by Andrés Gimeno and Pancho Gonzales.

== History ==
During Wimbledon in 1966, Jack Kramer was doing radio commentary for the BBC when Wimbledon's working chairman Herman David came to the broadcast booth and talked to Kramer and BBC tennis exec Bryan Cowgill about the possibility of making the tournament "open" to both amateurs and pros. The topic had been raised on and off for years. In the summer of 1960, the International Lawn Tennis Federation (ILTF) had met in Paris and voted on open tennis, and the motion received 134 votes, 5 short of the 139 required to pass. By 1966, public interest in tennis had been low for some time. Cowgill suggested a trial pro tournament at Wimbledon for the following year.

In late August, 1967, the Wimbledon Pro tournament was held. Total prize money was US$35,000 for singles and US$10,000 for doubles, making it the largest prize-money event in tennis history at that time. All matches were played on Centre Court. The tournament was deemed very successful, with over 30,000 spectators attending the three days of play. There was an 8-player draw for singles and a 4-teams draw for doubles, all professionals.

Most of the players had won honours at Wimbledon in their amateur days but had forfeited the right to play there on turning professional. The segregation of the two categories was soon to come to an end. In December 1967, the Annual Meeting of the British Lawn Tennis Association voted overwhelmingly to admit players of all categories for the 1968 Wimbledon Championships and other future tournaments in Britain. Faced with a fait accompli, the ILTF yielded and allowed each nation to determine its own legislation regarding amateur and professional players.

== Draws ==
=== Singles ===
Quarterfinals
1	(Australia) Rod Laver	6	6
(Australia) Fred Stolle	4	2
4	(Spain) Andrés Gimeno	6	6
(United States) Dennis Ralston	1	2
(Australia) Lew Hoad	3	11	8
3	(United States) Pancho Gonzales	6	9	6
(United States) Butch Buchholz	7	2	3
2	(Australia) Ken Rosewall	5	6	6

Semifinals
1	(Australia) Rod Laver	6	6
4	(Spain) Andrés Gimeno	3	4
(Australia) Lew Hoad	2	3
2	(Australia) Ken Rosewall	6	6

Final
1	(Australia) Rod Laver	6	6	12
2	(Australia) Ken Rosewall	2	2	10

=== Doubles ===
Semifinals
(United States) Butch Buchholz (Australia) Lew Hoad	9	1
(Australia) Rod Laver (Australia) Fred Stolle	11	6
(Spain) Andrés Gimeno (United States) Pancho Gonzales	6	7	6
(United States) Dennis Ralston (Australia) Ken Rosewall	4	9	4

Final
(Australia) Rod Laver (Australia) Fred Stolle	4	10
(Spain) Andrés Gimeno (United States) Pancho Gonzales	6	12

== See also ==
- Major professional tennis tournaments before the Open Era
