= Rod Laver =

Australian tennis player (born 1938)

Rod Laver AC MBE
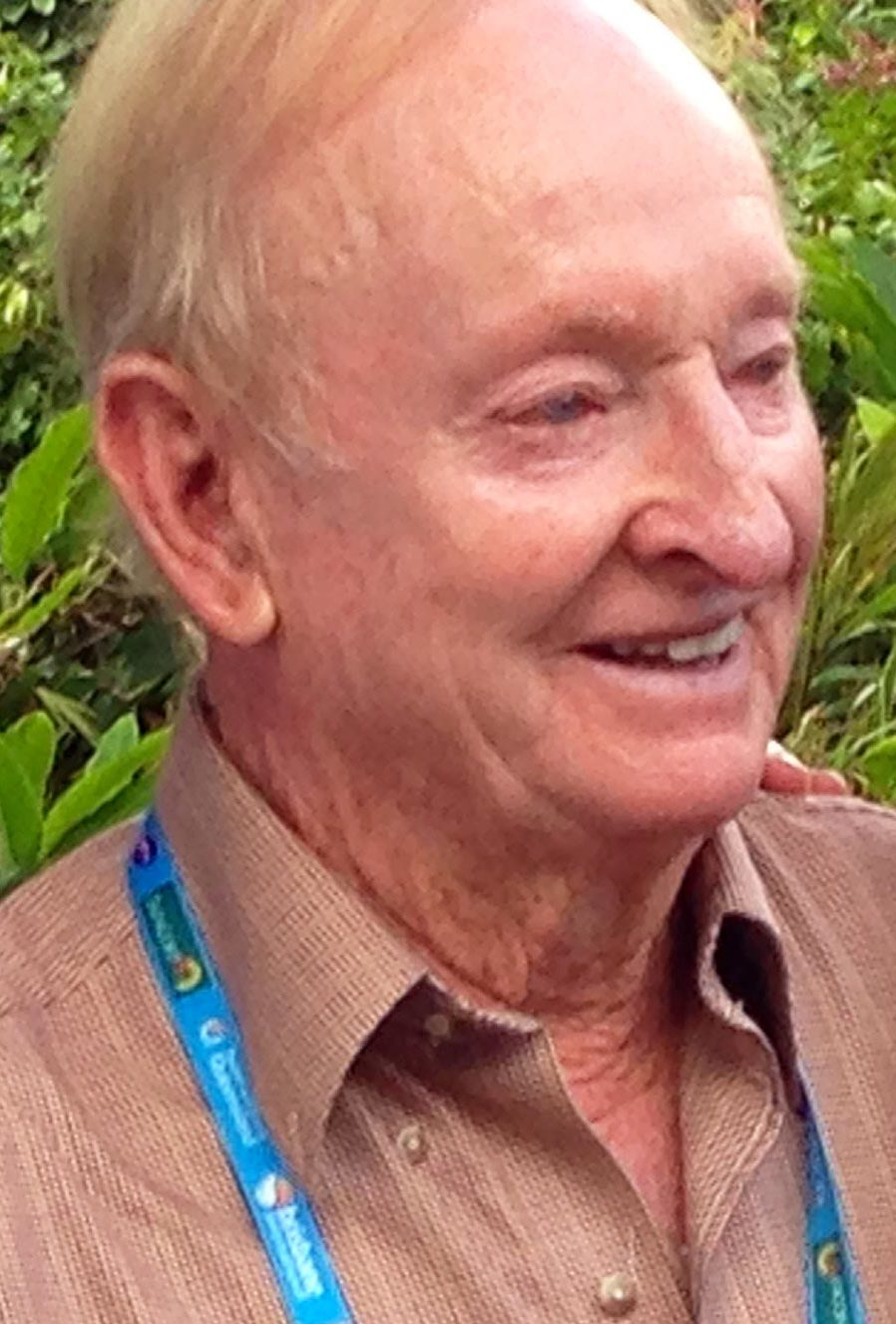
- Laver in 2015
- Full name: Rodney George Laver
- Country (sports): Australia
- Residence: Carlsbad, California, US
- Born: 9 August 1938 (age 88) Rockhampton, Queensland, Australia
- Height: 173 cm (5 ft 8 in)
- Turned pro: 1963 (amateur tour from 1956)
- Retired: 1979
- Plays: Left-handed (one-handed backhand)
- Prize money: US$1,565,413
- Int. Tennis HoF: 1981 (member page)

Singles
- Career record: 1689–538 in pre Open-Era & Open Era
- Career titles: 200 (72 open era titles listed by ATP)
- Highest ranking: No. 1 (1961, Lance Tingay)

Grand Slam singles results
- Australian Open: W (1960, 1962, 1969)
- French Open: W (1962, 1969)
- Wimbledon: W (1961, 1962, 1968, 1969)
- US Open: W (1962, 1969)

Other tournaments
- Tour Finals: RR – 2nd (1970)
- WCT Finals: F (1971, 1972)
- Professional majors
- US Pro: W (1964, 1966, 1967)
- Wembley Pro: W (1964, 1965, 1966, 1967)
- French Pro: W (1967)

Doubles
- Career record: 235–77 (75.32%) (Note: Open Era)
- Career titles: 28
- Highest ranking: No. 11 (per ATP)

Grand Slam doubles results
- Australian Open: W (1959, 1960, 1961, 1969)
- French Open: W (1961)
- Wimbledon: W (1971)
- US Open: F (1960, 1970, 1973)

Grand Slam mixed doubles results
- Australian Open: F (1959)
- French Open: W (1961)
- Wimbledon: W (1959, 1960)

Team competitions
- Davis Cup: W (1959, 1960, 1961, 1962, 1973)

Rodney George Laver (born 9 August 1938) is an Australian former professional tennis player. Laver was ranked as the world number 1 professional player indisputably for five years from 1965 to 1969, and by some sources also in 1964 and 1970. He was also ranked as the number 1 amateur in 1961 and 1962. Laver won 200 singles titles across his amateur and professional careers, the most won by any tennis player.

Laver won 11 major singles titles and 8 Pro major titles. He won the Grand Slam (winning all four majors in a calendar year) in singles twice, in 1962 and 1969; the latter remains the only time a man has done so in the Open Era. He also completed the Pro Slam (winning all three pro majors in one year) in 1967. Laver is the only player in the history of tennis (male or female) to have won titles on all court surfaces of his time (grass, clay, hard, carpet, wood), and he contributed to five Davis Cup titles for Australia during a time when the Davis Cup was deemed as significant as the four majors. The Rod Laver Arena (the main show court of the Australian Open) and the Laver Cup tennis tournament is named after him.

== Early life ==
Rodney George Laver was born in Rockhampton, Australia, on 9 August 1938. He was the third of four children of Roy Laver, a cattleman and butcher, and his wife Melba Roffey.

Amongst his relatives were the cricketers Frank Laver and Jack Laver.

He attended Rockhampton State High School in 1951.

== Career ==
=== Amateur (1956–62) ===
Laver was a teenager when he left school to pursue a tennis career that lasted 24 years. He was coached in Queensland by Charlie Hollis and later by the Australian Davis Cup team captain Harry Hopman, who gave Laver the nickname "Rocket".

Laver was both Australian and US Junior champion in 1957. He had his breakthrough on the world stage in 1959, when he reached all three finals at Wimbledon, winning the mixed doubles title with Darlene Hard. As an unseeded player, he lost the singles final to Peruvian Alex Olmedo after surviving an 87-game semifinal against American Barry MacKay. His first major singles title was the Australian Championships in 1960, where he defeated fellow Australian Neale Fraser in a five-set final after coming back from two sets down and saving a Fraser championship point in the fourth set. Laver captured his first Wimbledon singles crown in 1961 beating Chuck McKinley in straight sets in the final, which lasted just 53 minutes (one of the shortest men's singles Wimbledon finals on record). Laver was ranked the world No. 1 amateur in 1961 by Lance Tingay.

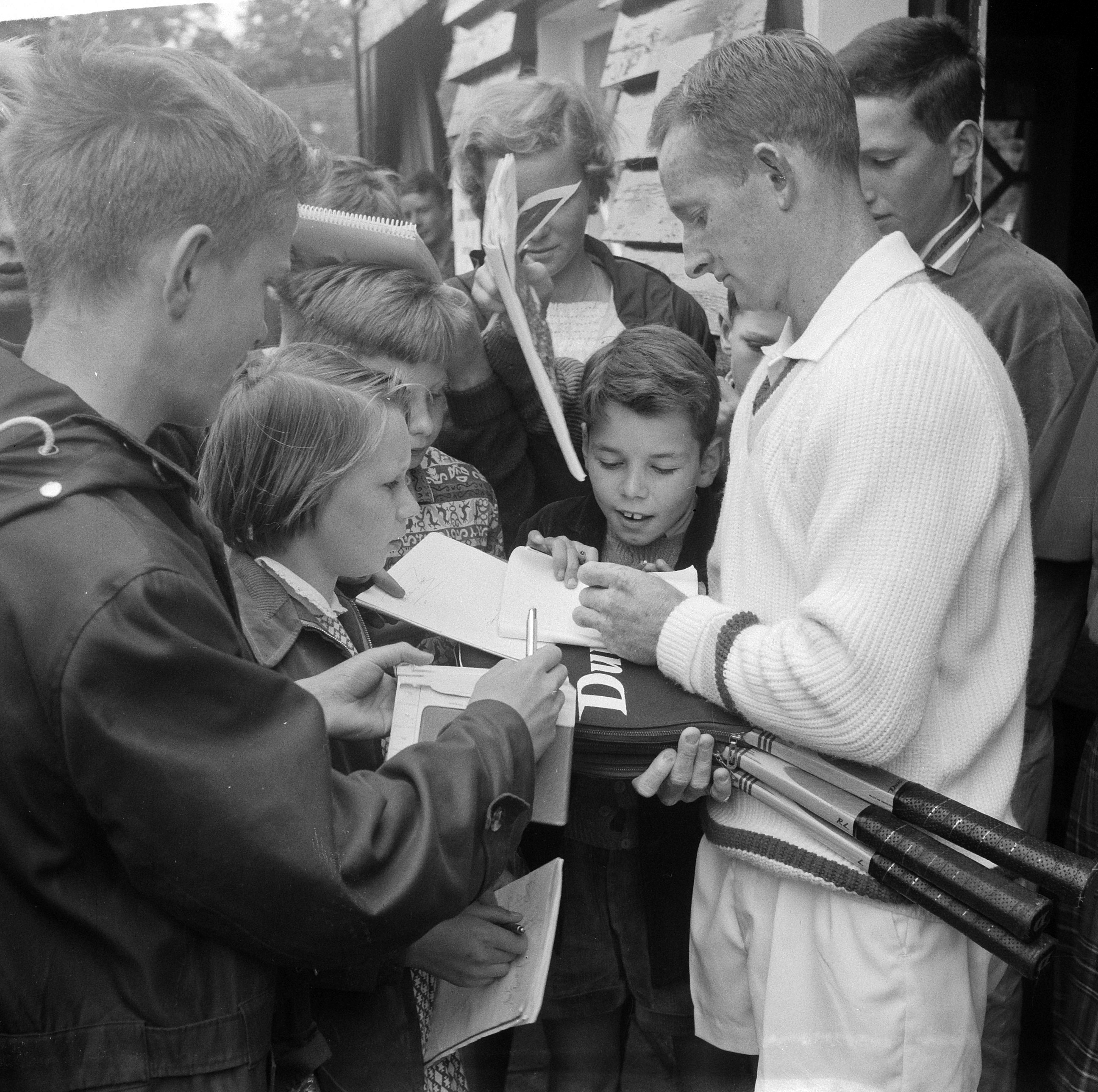
Rod Laver signing autographs at the Dutch Championships in July 1962

In 1962, Laver became the first male player since Don Budge in 1938 to win all four Grand Slam singles titles in the same year. He won an additional 18 titles, for a season total of 22. Among those titles were the Italian Championships and the German Championships, giving Laver the "clay court triple" of Paris, Rome, and Hamburg that had been achieved previously only by Lew Hoad in 1956. At the Australian championships, Laver beat Roy Emerson in the final. The biggest hurdle to Laver's winning the Grand Slam was the French Championships on slow clay, where Laver won three consecutive five-setters beginning with the quarterfinals. In his quarterfinal with Martin Mulligan, Laver saved a matchpoint in the fourth set with a backhand volley after coming to the net behind a second serve. In the final, Laver lost the first two sets and was down 0–3 in the fourth set before coming back to defeat Emerson. At Wimbledon, his progress was much easier. Laver lost only one set the whole tournament, to Manuel Santana in a quarterfinal, who held a set point for a two set lead. In the final, Laver beat Mulligan in 52 minutes (a minute shorter than the previous year's final). At the US Championships, Laver lost only two sets during the tournament and defeated Emerson again in the final. Laver was ranked world number one amateur for 1962 by Tingay, by Ned Potter and by an Ulrich Kaiser panel of 13 experts.

In February 1963, Laver appeared on the panel game show To Tell the Truth, where all four panelists identified him based on his knowledge of the history of tennis.

=== Professional ===
==== Before the Open Era (1963–68) ====
In December 1962, Laver turned professional after winning the Davis Cup with the Australian team. After an initial period of adjustment he quickly established himself among the leading professional players such as Ken Rosewall, Lew Hoad and Andrés Gimeno, and also Pancho Gonzales when Gonzales returned to a full-time schedule in 1964. During the next seven years, Laver won the U.S. Pro Tennis Championships five times, including four in a row beginning in 1966.

In the beginning of 1963, Laver was beaten consistently by both Rosewall and Hoad on an Australasian tour. Hoad won the first eight matches against Laver, and Rosewall won 11 out of 13. However, Laver won the best-of-five set matches against Rosewall at Kooyong Stadium and at Adelaide's Memorial Stadium. By the end of the year, with six tournament titles, Laver had become the No. 2 professional player behind Rosewall. In the first phase of the World Series tour, Laver finished second, with a 25–16 record. The top two players Rosewall and Laver then played a series of matches against each other to determine the champion. Rosewall won 14–4.

Laver's gross earnings for 1963 were first among the pro players.

In 1964, Laver and Rosewall both won seven important titles (in minor tournaments Laver won four and Rosewall won three), but Laver won 17 of 24 matches against Rosewall and captured the two most prestigious titles, the US Pro Championships over Gonzales and the Wembley Championships over Rosewall. In Tennis Week, Raymond Lee described the Wembley match, where Laver came from 5–3 down in the fifth set to win 8–6, as possibly their best ever and one that changed tennis history. Lee regards this win as the one that began and established Laver's long reign as world number one. The other prestige title, the French pro, was won by Rosewall. Rosewall finished top of the official points table in 1964 and after winning at Wembley, Laver said "I've still plenty of ambitions left and would like to be the world's No. 1. Despite this win, I am not there yet – Ken is."

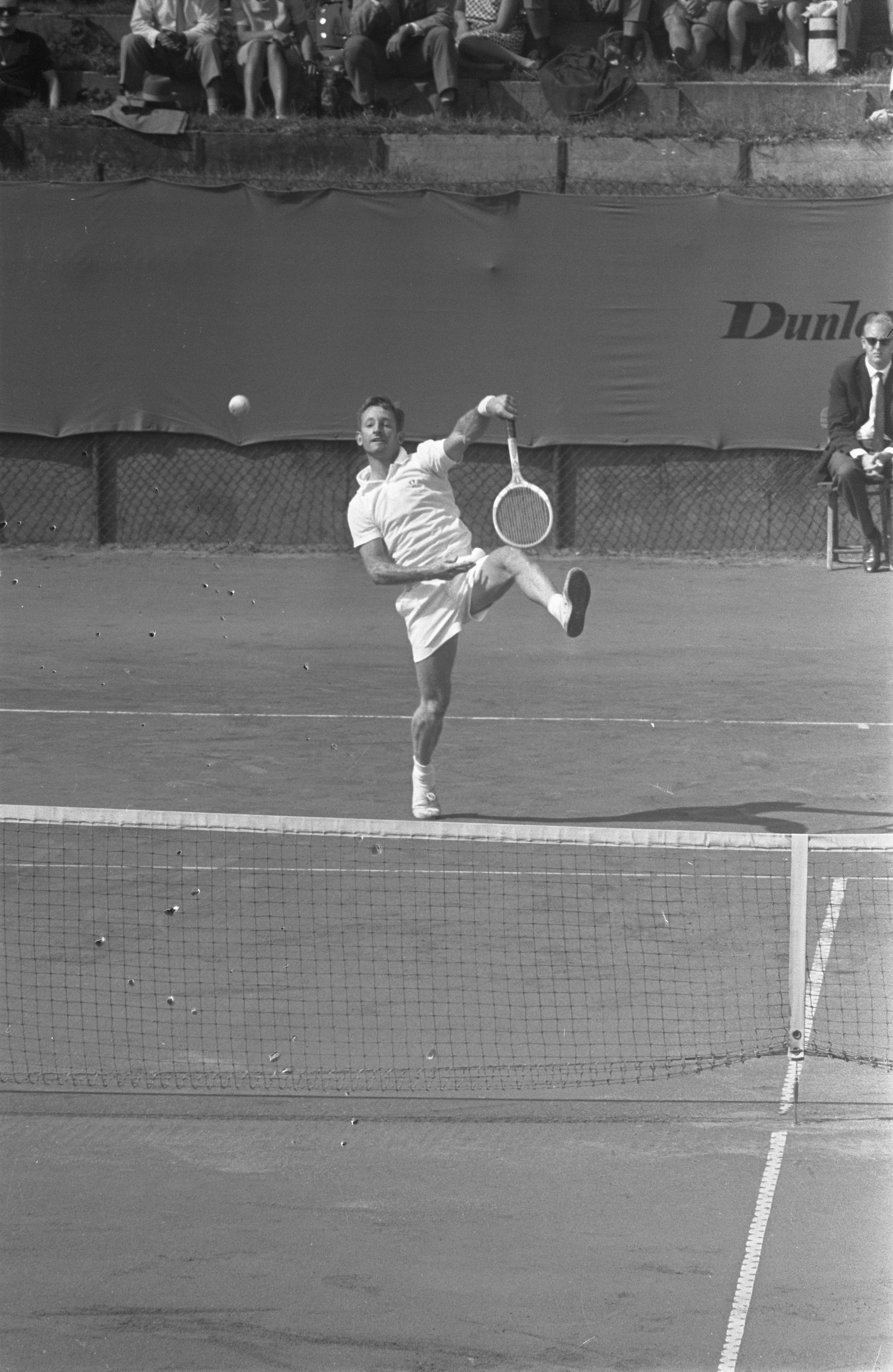
Rod Laver at Noordwijk in 1964

In 1965, Laver was clearly the No. 1 professional player, winning 17 titles and 13 of 18 matches against Rosewall. In ten finals, Laver won eight against the still dangerous Gonzales. Laver won the Wembley Pro, beating Gimeno in the final.

In 1966, Laver won 16 events, including the US Pro Championships (beating Rosewall in a five-set final), the Wembley Pro Championship (beating Rosewall easily in the final), and eight other important tournaments.

In 1967, Laver won 19 titles, including the Wimbledon Pro (beating Rosewall in straight sets in the final), the US Pro Championships (beating Gimeno in the final), the Wembley Pro Championships (beating Rosewall in the final), and the French Pro Championship (beating Gimeno in the final), which gave him a clean sweep of the four most important professional titles, a professional Grand Slam. The Wimbledon Pro tournament in 1967 was the only professional event ever staged on Wimbledon's Centre Court before the Open Era began.

==== During the Open Era (1968–76) ====
With the dawn of the Open Era in 1968, professional players were once again allowed to compete in Grand Slam events. Laver became Wimbledon's first Open Era champion in 1968, beating the best amateur, American Arthur Ashe, in a semifinal and fellow-Australian Tony Roche in the final, both in straight sets. Laver was also the runner-up to Ken Rosewall in the first French Open. In this first "open" year, there were only eight open events besides Wimbledon and the French Open, where professionals, registered players, and amateurs could compete against each other. The professionals mainly played their own circuit, with two groups – National Tennis League (NTL) and World Championships Tennis (WCT) – operating. Laver was ranked No. 1 universally, winning the US Professional Championships on grass and the French Pro Championship on clay (both over John Newcombe). Laver also won the last big open event of the year, the Pacific Southwest in Los Angeles on hard courts. Ashe regarded Laver's 4–6, 6–0, 6–0 final win over Ken Rosewall as one of his finest performances. Laver's post-match comment was, "This is the kind of match you always dream about. The kind you play at night in your sleep." Laver ranked No. 1 for 1968 by the panel of journalists for the 'Martini and Rossi' Award, by an Ulrich Kaiser panel of 18 experts, by Seagrams (a panel of 15 journalists), by World Tennis, by Lance Tingay, by Rino Tommasi, by Bud Collins and by The Times.

In 1969, Laver won all four Grand Slam tournaments in the same calendar year for the second time, sealing the achievement with a four-set win over Roche in the US Open final. He won 18 of the 32 singles tournaments he entered (still the Open Era titles record) and compiled a 106–16 win–loss record. In beating Newcombe in four sets in the Wimbledon final, he captured the title at the All England Club for the fourth consecutive time that he had entered the tournament (and reached the final for the sixth consecutive time as he had been runner-up in 1959 and 1960). He set a record of 31 consecutive match victories at Wimbledon between 1961 and 1970, which lasted until 1980 when it was eclipsed by Björn Borg. Unlike his first Grand Slam year in 1962, Laver in 1969 played in events open to all the best professional and amateur players of the world. In the year's Grand Slam tournaments, Laver had five five-set-matches, twice coming back from two sets down in early rounds. In the four finals, however, he lost a total of only two sets. His hardest match was a marathon 90-game semifinal against Roche at the Australian Open under tropical hot conditions. Other opponents at the Australian Open included Roy Emerson, Fred Stolle, and Andrés Gimeno. At the French Open, Laver beat Gimeno, Tom Okker, and Rosewall. At Wimbledon, Laver overcame strong challenges from Stan Smith, Cliff Drysdale, Ashe, and Newcombe. At the US Open on slippery grass courts, he defeated Dennis Ralston, Emerson, Ashe, and Roche. Laver proved his versatility by winning the Grand Slam tournaments on grass and clay, plus the two most important hard court titles (South African Open at Ellis Park, Johannesburg and the US Professional Championships at Boston) and the leading indoor tournaments (Philadelphia US Pro Indoor and Wembley British Indoor). Laver ranked No. 1 for 1969 by the panel of 13 international journalists for the 'Martini and Rossi' Award, by Tingay, by Collins, by Tommasi, by Frank Rostron and by World Tennis.

In the early 1970s, Laver lost his grip on the major tournaments. He played only five Grand Slam tournaments from 1970 through 1972. This was partly because of his contracts with NTL and WCT. But on the WCT tours, he remained the leading player and by far the leading prize money winner.

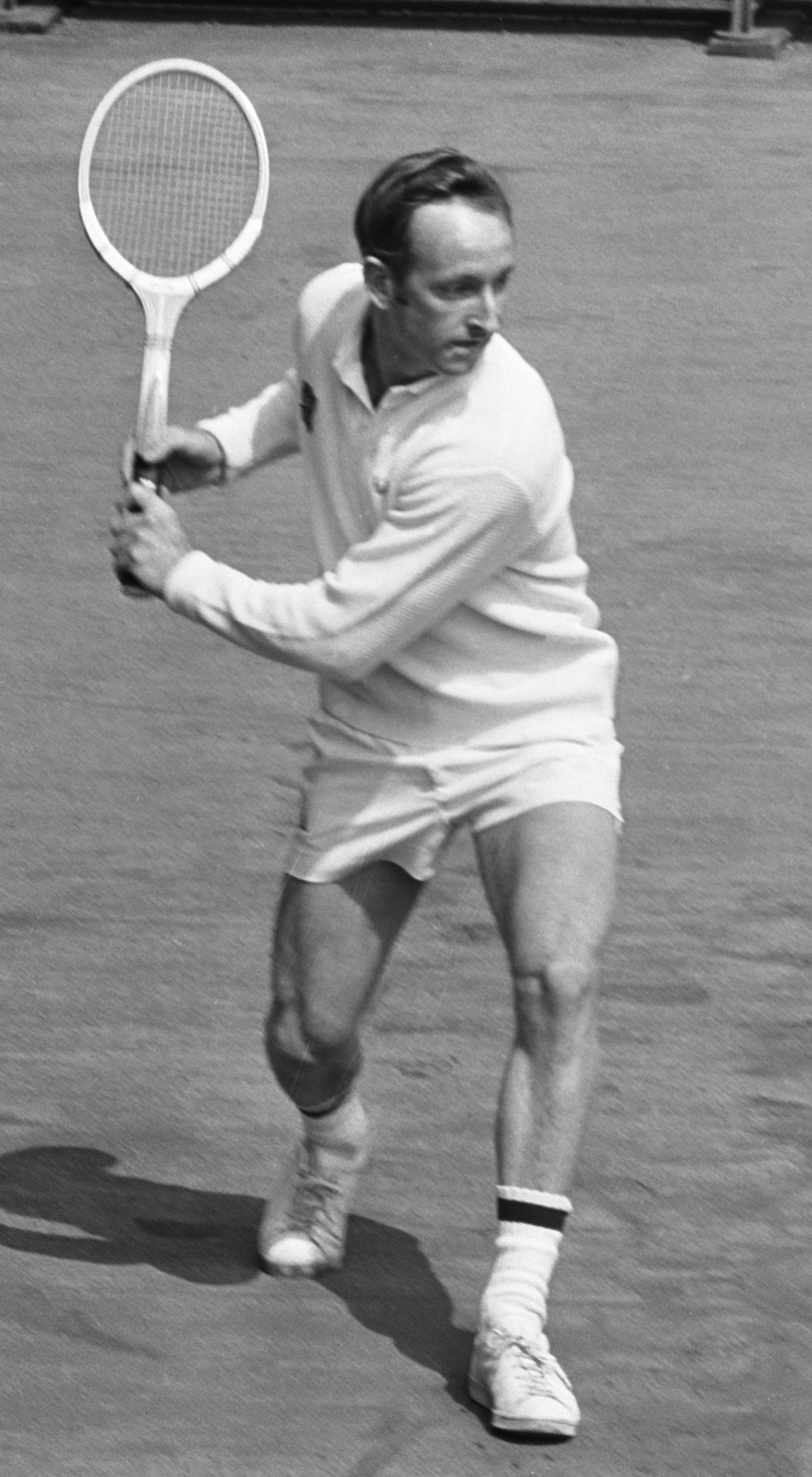
Laver during the Top Tennis Tournament in Amsterdam in May 1969

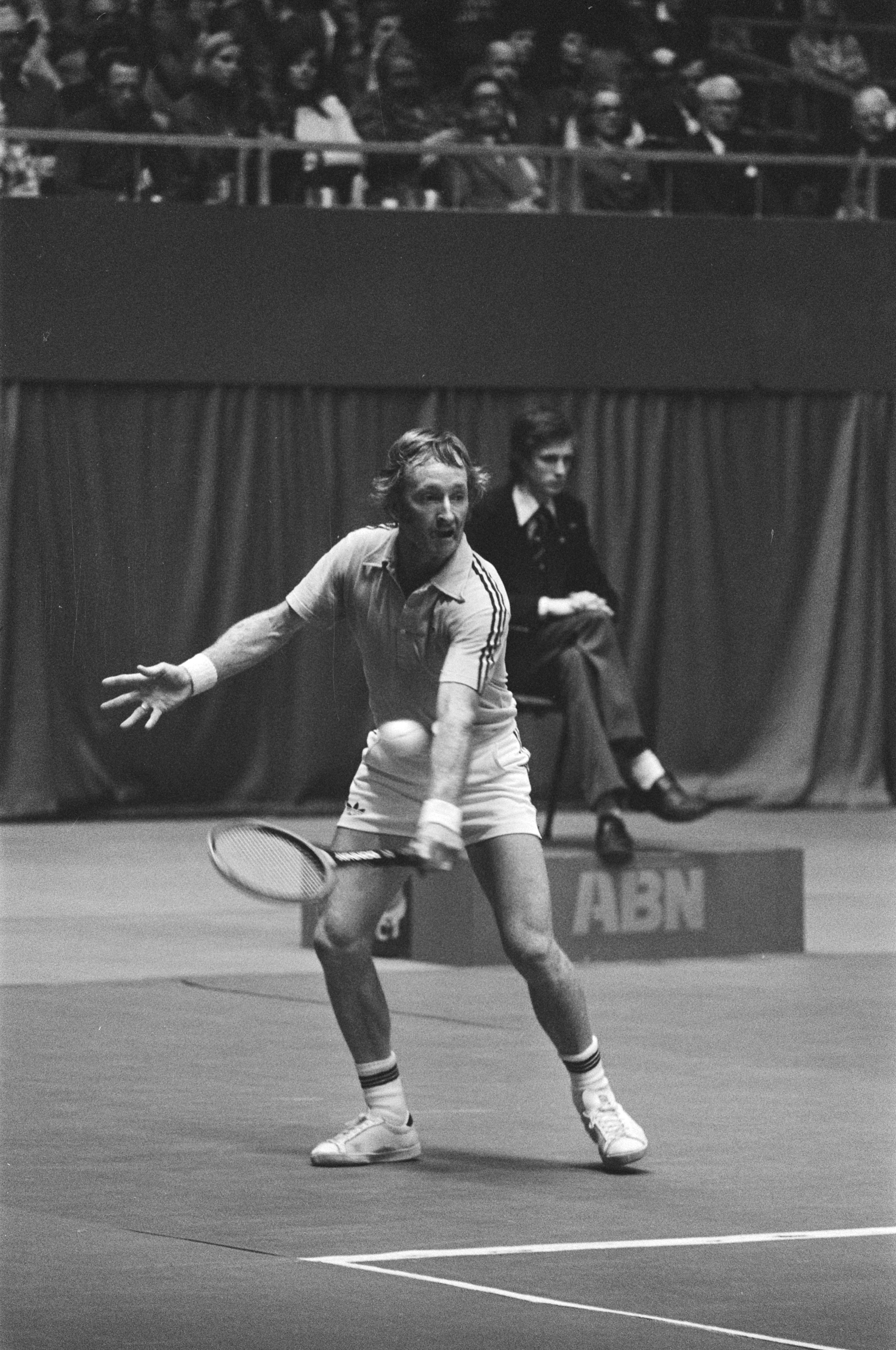
Rod Laver at the 1976 ABN World Tennis Tournament in Rotterdam

In 1970, Laver won 15 titles and US$201,453 in prize money, including the rich "Tennis Champions Classic" and five other big events (Sydney Dunlop Open, Philadelphia, Wembley, Los Angeles, South African Open). Those were the equivalent of the modern day ATP Masters Series and most had 8 or more of the world's top ranked players participating. With only two majors played by all the best players (Wimbledon and the US Open), there was no clear-cut World No. 1 in 1970. Wimbledon champion Newcombe, US champion Rosewall, and Laver (who won the most titles and had a 3–0 win–loss record against Newcombe and a 5–0 record against Rosewall) were ranked the highest by different journalists and expert panels. The panel of 10 international journalists who voted for the 'Martini and Rossi' Award, ranked Rosewall No. 1 with 97 points over Laver (89 pts) and Newcombe (81 pts). The panel of 12 journalists which made the WCT draw for 1971 ranked Laver 1st, Rosewall 2nd and Newcombe 3rd. Rex Bellamy ranked Laver No. 1, with Rosewall No. 2. Judith Elian of L'Equipe Magazine (Paris) and Rino Tommasi placed Rosewall No. 1, while Robert Geist co-ranked Rosewall, Laver and Newcombe No. 1. Newcombe later wrote in his autobiography "Newk-Life On and Off the Court" (2002) that the top honour for 1970 belonged to Laver. Lance Tingay, John McCauley and Bud Collins. ranked Newcombe ahead of Rosewall and Laver.

In 1971, Laver won seven titles, including the Italian Open in Rome on clay over Jan Kodeš, the reigning French Open champion. Laver successfully defended his title at the "Tennis Champions Classic", winning 13 consecutive winner-take-all matches against top opponents and US$160,000. For the year, Laver won a then-record US$292,717 in tournament prize money and became the first tennis player to surpass US$1 million in career prize money. In 1971 and 1972, Laver finished as the points leader of the WCT tournament series but lost the playoff finals at Dallas to Rosewall. The last match is rated as one of the best of all time and drew a TV audience of over 20 million.

In 1972, Laver cut back his tournament schedule, partly because of back and knee injuries and his tennis camp businesses, but he still won five titles that year. In 1973, Laver won seven titles and successfully participated in the semifinals and final of the Davis Cup, where he won all six of his rubbers for Australia. In 1974 Laver won six titles from 13 tournaments and ended the year as World No. 4 based on the ATP point system. At 36, he was the oldest player during the Open Era to have been included in the year-ending top five.

In 1975, Laver set a record for WCT tournaments by winning four titles and 23 consecutive matches but in 1976, he semi-retired from the main tour, playing only a few selected events. He also signed with World Team Tennis, where he became "Rookie of the Year" at the age of 38 but won five titles overall that season.

Overall, despite turning 30 just months after the Open Era began, Laver had tremendous success, winning 74 singles titles, which remains seventh most of the era. Plus, like most players of his day, he regularly played doubles, winning 37 titles.

Laver's career earnings were approximately $1,540,000.

=== Rivalries ===
Laver had a long-running, friendly rivalry with Ken Rosewall between 1963, when he started out as a pro, and 1976, when both were semi-retired from the main tour. Including tournaments and one-night stands, they played at least 164 matches, all of them as professionals, with some results from the barnstorming pro tours lost or badly recorded. Overall a match score of 89–75 in favour of Laver can be documented.

Against the older Pancho Gonzales, whom he played 1964 to 1970 on the pro tour, Laver had a lead of 43–22.

Laver had another, even longer rivalry with his fellow Queenslander Roy Emerson. They met first on the senior amateur tour in 1958 and dominated the amateur circuit until 1962, before Laver turned pro. When open tennis arrived in 1968, Emerson joined the pro tour, and had many new battles with Laver. Overall the score is 49–18 in favour of Laver, with 7–2 in major Grand Slam tournaments.

Laver had also many battles with Lew Hoad in his first years on the pro circuit 1963–1966. Although he lost the first eight matches in January 1963, Laver later in the year began to turn around their rivalry, and until 1966, he had built a 38–21 lead. Against Arthur Ashe, Laver had a head-to-head lead of 21–3, winning all of the first 18 matches. Ashe's first win came in 1974, when Laver was 35. Another younger rival in the Open Era was John Newcombe, whom Laver led 16–5 in their head-to-head score.

=== Davis Cup ===
Laver helped Australia win the Davis Cup four consecutive times from 1959 to 1962. In 1973, professionals were permitted to play in the Davis Cup for the first time, and Laver was on a winning team for the fifth time, claiming two singles and a doubles rubber in the final as Australia beat the United States 5–0. Australia were crowned Davis Cup champions in each of the five seasons Laver played in the competition. Laver won 16 out of 20 Davis Cup singles matches and all four of his doubles.

Zone	Round	Date	Opponents	Tie score	Location	Surface	Match	Opponent	W/L	Rubber score
1959 Davis Cup
NCA	SF	18–20 Jul 1959	Mexico	4–1	Mexico City	Clay	Singles 2	Mario Llamas	L	4–6, 4–6, 3–6
NCA	SF	18–20 Jul 1959	Mexico	4–1	Mexico City	Clay	Singles 4	Tony Palafox	W	6–3, 6–8, 4–6, 7–5, 6–3
NCA	F	24–26 Jul 1959	Canada	5–0	Montreal	Grass	Singles 2	Robert Bédard	W	8–6, 6–3, 6–4
NCA	F	24–26 Jul 1959	Canada	5–0	Montreal	Grass	Singles 5	François Godbout	W	7–9, 6–4, 6–2, 6–1
AIZ	F	31 Jul–2 Aug 1959	Cuba	5–0	Montreal	Grass	Doubles (Emerson)	Orlando Garrido; Reynaldo Garrido	W	6–4, 6–4, 6–4
IZ	SF	7–10 Jul 1959	Italy	4–1	Philadelphia	Grass	Singles 1	Nicola Pietrangeli	W	6–4, 2–6, 6–3, 6–3
IZ	SF	7–10 Jul 1959	Italy	4–1	Philadelphia	Grass	Singles 4	Orlando Sirola	W	4–6, 6–4, 6–0, 6–3
IZ	F	14–16 Aug 1959	India	4–1	Boston	Grass	Singles 1	Ramanathan Krishnan	L	1–6, 4–6, 10–8, 4–6
IZ	F	14–16 Aug 1959	India	4–1	Boston	Grass	Singles 4	Premjit Lall	W	6–2, 10–8, 6–4
CR	F	28–31 Aug 1959	United States	3–2	New York City	Grass	Singles 1	Barry MacKay (tennis)	L	5–7, 4–6, 1–6
CR	F	28–31 Aug 1959	United States	3–2	New York City	Grass	Singles 4	Alex Olmedo	L	7–9, 6–4, 8–10, 10–12
1960 Davis Cup
CR	F	26–28 Dec 1960	Italy	4–1	Sydney	Grass	Singles 2	Nicola Pietrangeli	W	8–6, 6–4, 6–3
CR	F	26–28 Dec 1960	Italy	4–1	Sydney	Grass	Singles 4	Orlando Sirola	W	9–7, 6–2, 6–3
1961 Davis Cup
CR	F	26–28 Dec 1961	Italy	5–0	Melbourne	Grass	Singles 2	Orlando Sirola	W	6–1, 6–4, 6–3
CR	F	26–28 Dec 1961	Italy	5–0	Melbourne	Grass	Singles 4	Nicola Pietrangeli	W	6–3, 3–6, 4–6, 6–3, 8–6
1962 Davis Cup
CR	F	26–28 Dec 1962	Mexico	5–0	Brisbane	Grass	Singles 1	Rafael Osuna	W	6–2, 6–1, 7–5
CR	F	26–28 Dec 1962	Mexico	5–0	Brisbane	Grass	Doubles (Emerson)	Rafael Osuna; Tony Palafox	W	7–5, 6–2, 6–4
CR	F	26–28 Dec 1962	Mexico	5–0	Brisbane	Grass	Singles 5	Tony Palafox	W	6–1, 4–6, 6–4, 8–6
1973 Davis Cup
IZ	SF	16–18 Nov 1973	Czechoslovakia	4–1	Melbourne	Grass	Singles 1	Jan Kodeš	W	6–3, 7–5, 7–5
IZ	SF	16–18 Nov 1973	Czechoslovakia	4–1	Melbourne	Grass	Doubles (Rosewall)	Jan Kodeš; Vladimir Zednik	W	6–4, 14–12, 7–9, 8–6
IZ	SF	16–18 Nov 1973	Czechoslovakia	4–1	Melbourne	Grass	Singles 4	Jiří Hřebec	W	6–1, 4–6, 6–4, 8–6
CR	F	30 Nov–2 Dec 1973	United States	5–0	Cleveland	Carpet (i)	Singles 2	Tom Gorman	W	8–10, 8–6, 6–8, 6–3, 6–1
CR	F	30 Nov–2 Dec 1973	United States	5–0	Cleveland	Carpet (i)	Doubles (Newcombe)	Stan Smith; Erik van Dillen	W	6–1, 6–2, 6–4
CR	F	30 Nov–2 Dec 1973	United States	5–0	Cleveland	Carpet (i)	Singles 5	Stan Smith	W	6–3, 6–4, 3–6, 6–2

== Playing style ==
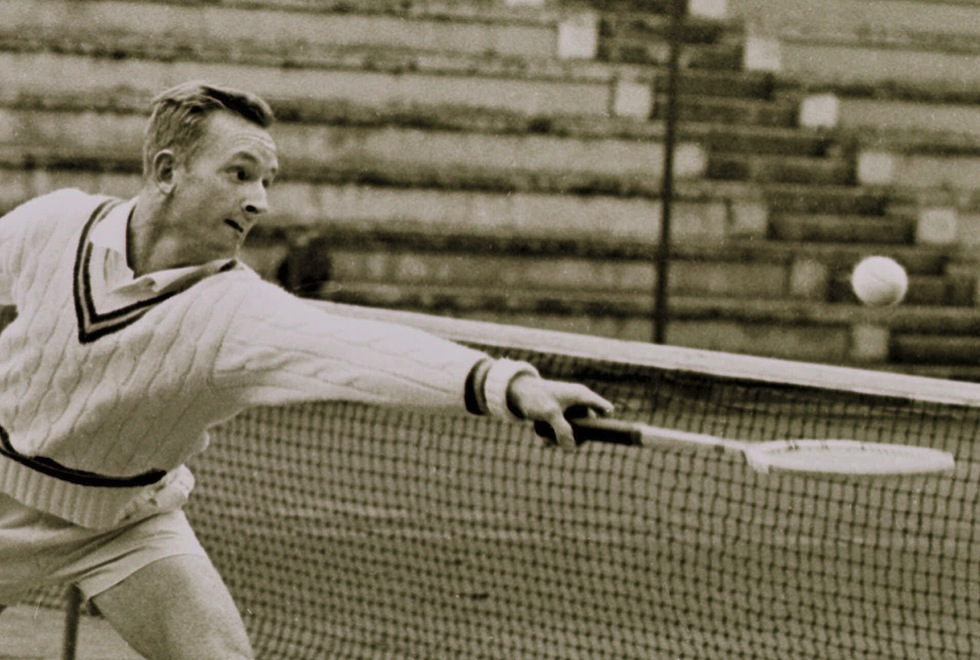
Laver reaches for a backhand volley against Jovanović during their singles semifinal match in the 1962 Italian Open.

Although of average height and medium build (1.73 m; 5 ft 8 in), Laver developed a technically complete serve-and-volley game, with aggressive groundstrokes to back it up. Commentator Dan Maskell described him as "technically faultless". His left-handed serve was well disguised and wide swinging. His groundstrokes on both flanks were hit with topspin, as was the attacking topspin lob, which Laver developed into a weapon. His stroke technique was based on quick shoulder turns, true swings, and accurate timing. His backhand, often hit on the run, was a point-ender that gave him an advantage. Laver was very quick and had a strong left forearm. Rex Bellamy wrote, "The strength of that wrist and forearm gave him blazing power without loss of control, even when he was on the run and at full stretch. The combination of speed and strength, especially wrist strength, enabled him to hit ferocious winners when way out of court." At the net, he had forcing volleys, often hit as stroke volleys. Especially on the backhand, he could hit sharp underspin angles as well. He was difficult to lob, because of his springing agility, and when forced to retreat, he could come up with a vicious counterpunch.

As an amateur, Laver was a somewhat flashy player, often a late starter. He had to learn to control his adventurous shot-making and integrate percentage tennis into his game when he turned professional. In his prime, he could adapt his style to all surfaces and to all conditions. Laver had a strong record in five-set-matches, often turning things around with subtle changes of tactics.

== Tennis legacy ==
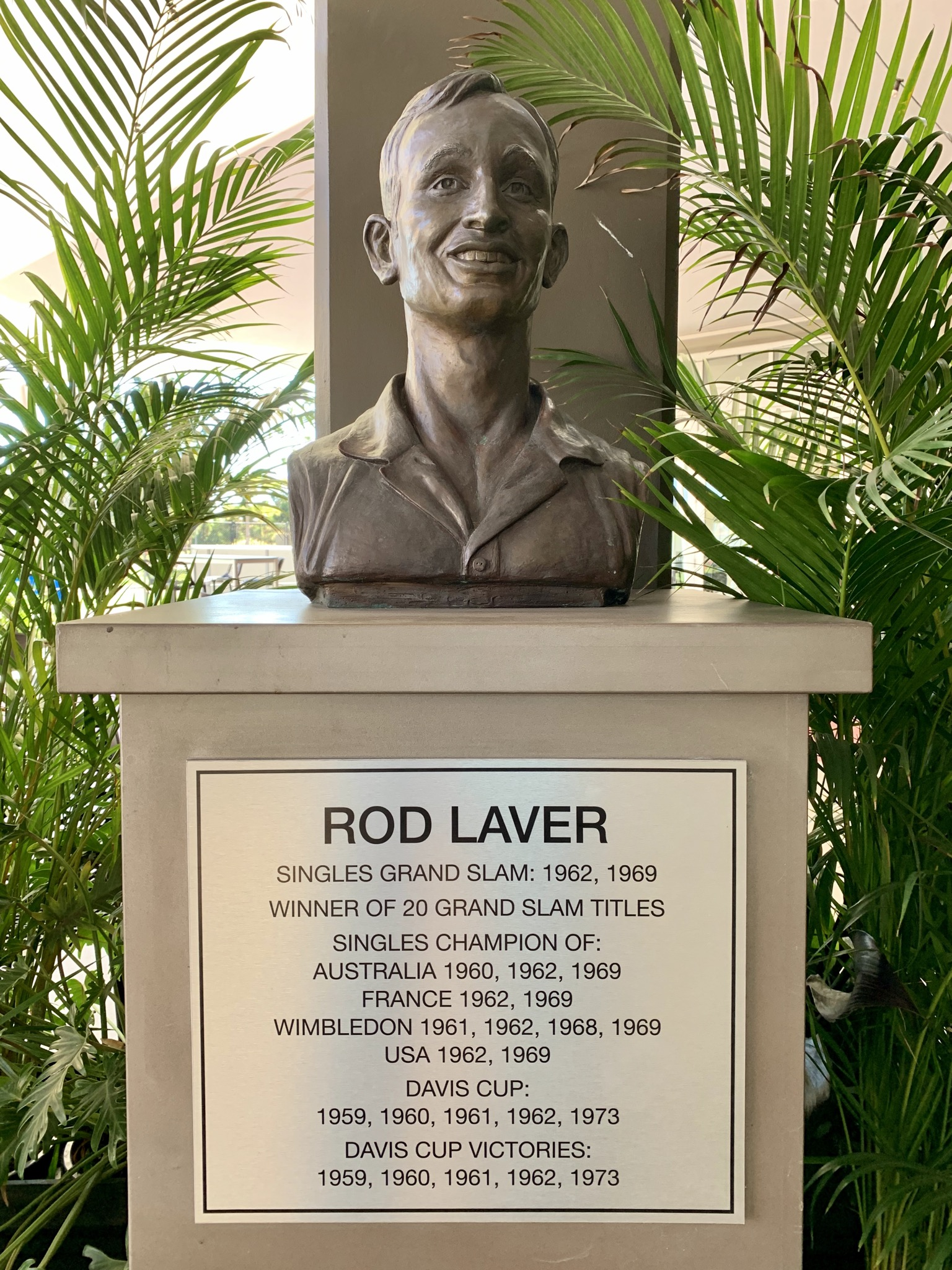
Bust of Laver at the Pat Rafter Arena, in Queensland.

Laver is regarded by many as the greatest tennis player in the history of the sport. (Note: See)

Laver won six major titles as an amateur, including the Grand Slam (Australian, French, Wimbledon, and US Championships), before turning professional in December 1962. From then until 1968 he was banned from playing in any tournaments except for those on the professional circuit. He won eight Pro major titles (which included the 1967 Professional Grand Slam), along with the Masters Pro, Madison Square Garden Pro (twice), Forest Hills Pro, and the Wimbledon Pro. After the Open Era began in 1968 Laver won five more major championships, bringing his final total to 11 and comprising his second Grand Slam; the only male singles player to win two Grand Slams and the only male singles player to do so in the Open Era. Laver also won nine major doubles titles.

Laver won titles on all court surfaces of his time (grass, clay, hard, carpet, wood), and he contributed to five Davis Cup titles for Australia during a time when the Davis Cup was deemed as significant as the four majors. The Rod Laver Arena (the main show court of the Australian Open) and the Laver Cup tournament are named after him.

Laver was ranked the world No. 1 amateur in 1961 by Lance Tingay and in 1962 by Tingay and Ned Potter. Laver was the number one professional in some rankings in 1964, in all rankings from 1965 to 1969, and in some rankings in 1970. His record 200 career singles titles will likely never be broken. He also holds the record for most titles won in a single year during the amateur era (22 in 1962), during the touring pro era (19 in 1967), and during the Open Era (18 in 1969). His rivalry with Ken Rosewall is among the greatest the sport has ever seen.

Most tennis experts (former players, historians, and the press) have high praise for Laver and his place in history. Dan Maskell, John Barrett, Butch Buchholz, Cliff Drysdale, Joe McCauley, Ted Schroeder, and Tony Trabert rank Laver as the best of all time. Trabert said in January 2008, "I still maintain that Rod Laver is the best player who ever played the game because he's done something no one has ever done in the 120 or 140-year history of our sport: he won the Grand Slam as an amateur and he won the Grand Slam as a pro." Malcolm Knox of the Sydney Morning Herald put Laver and Ken Rosewall in a class of two. Former players Frank Sedgman, Ellsworth Vines, Don Budge, and Sidney Wood, ranked Laver all-time as 3, 4, 5, and 5, respectively. In 1983, Fred Perry ranked Laver No. 1 in the post-World War II greatest players list. Tennis promoter and former Wimbledon champion Jack Kramer ranked Laver outside his six best all-time.

In 1986, the US magazine Inside Tennis polled 37 experts, and Laver was ranked first on their list. An Associated Press poll in 2000, had Laver was voted "The Male Tennis Player of the Century". Laver also topped the list of Tennis Week in 2007, where historian Raymond Lee analyzed the all-time best players. In the 2012 Tennis Channel production "100 Greatest of All Time" Laver was ranked No. 2 behind Roger Federer. In July 2017, Federer called Rod Laver the greatest of all time.

Tennis historian and commentator Bud Collins was often undecided between Laver, Bill Tilden, and Pancho Gonzales as far as who was the greatest of all time. But in 1989 he wrote, "I remain unconvinced that there ever was a better player than Rod Laver".

== Honours ==
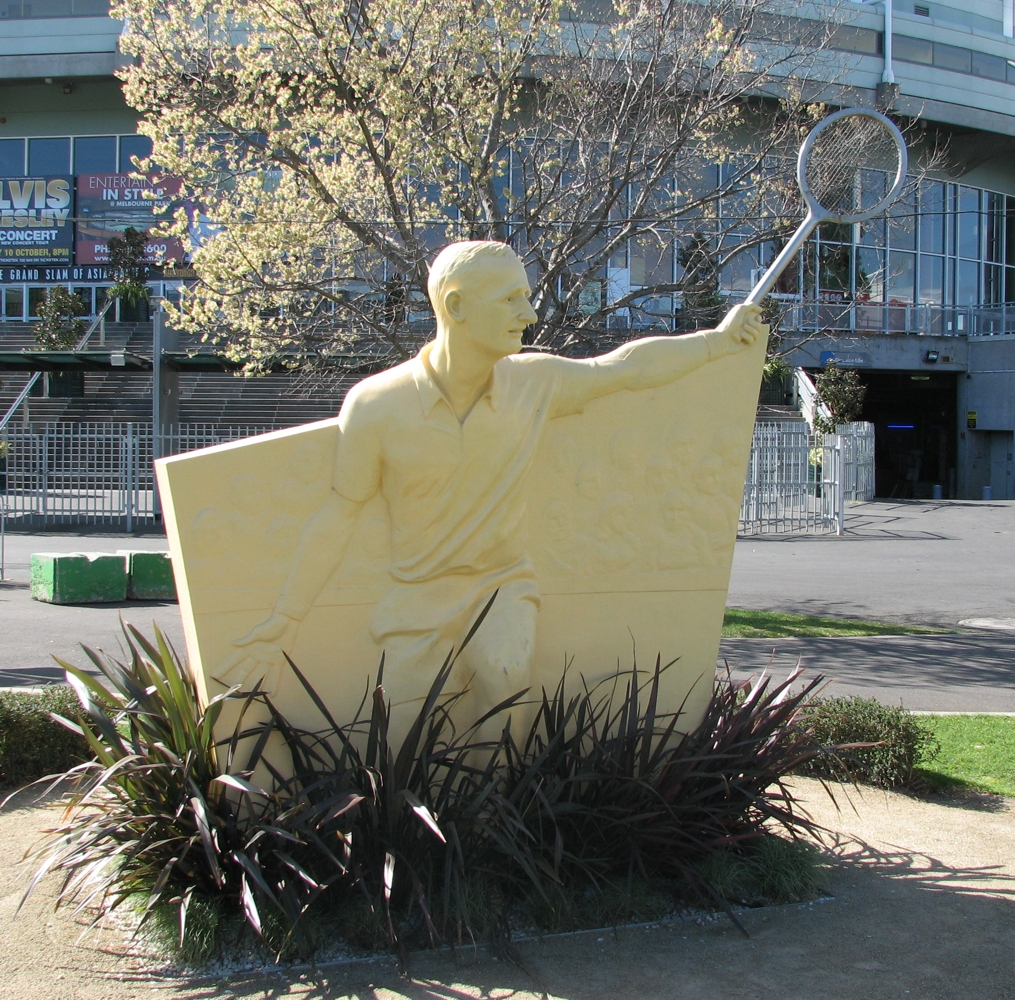
Sculpture depicting Rod Laver outside the Rod Laver Arena, Melbourne.

In 2000, the centre court at Melbourne Park, which today hosts the Australian Open, was named the Rod Laver Arena in his honour. In 2016, he was appointed a Companion of the Order of Australia.

The hall at the Rockhampton Tennis Association's Victoria Park precinct in Wandal where Laver competed until the age of 14 was named the Rod Laver Hall upon its completion in December 1963 in recognition of his Grand Slam win the previous year.

In 1969, Laver was awarded the ABC Sportsman of the Year Award and the BBC Overseas Sports Personality of the Year. He was inducted into the International Tennis Hall of Fame in 1981. He was inducted into the Sport Australia Hall of Fame in 1985 and upgraded to a Legend of Australian Sport in 2002. He is also an Australian Living Treasure. In 1998, Laver received the Philippe Chatrier Award (the ITF's highest accolade) for his contributions to tennis and in 2000, Centre Court at the National Tennis Centre in Melbourne was renamed Rod Laver Arena.

Laver was named as a Queensland Great in June 2005. In 2009, he was inducted into the Queensland Sport Hall of Fame. Also in 2009, as part of the Q150 celebrations, Laver was named one of the Q150 Icons of Queensland.

Bronze busts of Laver and Margaret Court by sculptor Barbara McLean were unveiled at Melbourne Park in 1993 upon their induction into the Australian Tennis Hall of Fame. Another bronze bust of Laver, also by McLean, was installed on the banks of the Fitzroy River in Rockhampton's city centre which was unveiled by Laver and Rockhampton City Council deputy mayor Dell Bunt on 7 December 2002. There was some concern raised by the local community when the bust was removed in 2016 during the riverbank redevelopment. However, the bust was re-installed upon the completion of the redevelopment which was officially opened in 2018, with the recreational precinct on the low bank being named Rod Laver Plaza. A bronze statue of Laver by sculptor Lis Johnson was unveiled at Melbourne Park prior to the 2017 Australian Open.

Member of the Order of the British Empire (MBE)	1970 Queen's Birthday Honours – "For service to Tennis"
Australian Sports Medal	30 August 2000 – "Possibly the greatest player ever. The only player to capture two "Grand Slams""
Companion of the Order of Australia (AC)	2016 Australia Day Honours – "For eminent service to tennis as a player, representative and mentor, at the national and international level, and as a role model for young sportsmen and women".

== Personal life ==
On 27 July 1998, Laver suffered a stroke while being interviewed by ESPN-TV in the United States for their SportsCentury 20th Century sports retrospective series. He was hospitalised for a month and suffered from memory and speech difficulties after the stroke, but recovered over the course of the following year.

In 1966, Laver married Mary Benson in San Rafael, California. Born Mary Shelby Peterson in Illinois, she was a divorcee with three children and ten years his senior. Together, they had a son named Rick. The family lived at various locations in California including Rancho Mirage, Corona del Mar, a ranch near Santa Barbara and Carlsbad. Mary Laver died in November 2012 at the age of 84 at their home in Carlsbad. Since 2018, he has been living with his partner Susan Johnson, a widow from Florida.

In 1985, Laver's cousin was killed in the crash of Delta Air Lines Flight 191; the latter's son survived the crash.

Laver resides in Carlsbad, California, and attended Los Angeles Chargers games on occasion. On 1 October 2017, he was inducted into the Southern California Tennis Hall of Fame.

== Performance timeline ==
Key
W	F	SF	QF	#R	RR	Q#	DNQ	A	NH

(W) winner; (F) finalist; (SF) semifinalist; (QF) quarterfinalist; (#R) rounds 4, 3, 2, 1; (RR) round-robin stage; (Q#) qualification round; (DNQ) did not qualify; (A) absent; (NH) not held; (SR) strike rate (events won / competed); (W–L) win–loss record.

Laver joined the professional tennis circuit in 1963 and as a consequence was banned from competing in the amateur Grand Slams until the start of the Open Era at the 1968 French Open.

Tournament	Amateur career							Professional career					Open career									
Tournament	'56	'57	'58	'59	'60	'61	'62	'63	'64	'65	'66	'67	'68	'69	'70	'71	'72	'73	'74	'75	'76	'77
Grand Slam tournaments
Australian Open	1R	1R	2R	3R	W	F	W	A	A	A	A	A	A	W	A	3R	A	A	A	A	A	A
French Open	1R	A	2R	3R	3R	SF	W	A	A	A	A	A	F	W	A	A	A	A	A	A	A	A
Wimbledon	1R	A	3R	F	F	W	W	A	A	A	A	A	W	W	4R	QF	A	A	A	A	A	2R
US Open	1R	A	4R	QF	F	F	W	A	A	A	A	A	4R	W	4R	A	4R	3R	A	4R	A	A
Pro Slam tournaments
U.S. Pro	A	A	A	A	A	A	A	F	W	F	W	W	not a Major									
French Pro	A	A	A	A	A	A	A	F	F	F	F	W	not a Major									
Wembley Pro	A	A	A	A	A	A	A	QF	W	W	W	W	not a Major									

== Career statistics and records ==
=== All-time tournament records ===
- Records in **bold** indicate peerless achievements.
- Combined tours: NTL, WCT and Grand Prix

**Championship**	**Record accomplished**	**Player tied**	Reference
Pro Major tournaments	Won the Professional Grand Slam (1967)	Ken Rosewall	
Grand Slam tournaments	Won the Grand Slam twice (1962, 1969)	**Stands alone**	
All Major tournaments (Slams + Pro Majors)	Reached 14 consecutive Major finals (1964–68)	**Stands alone**	
All Major tournaments (Slams + Pro Majors)	Titles on 3 different surfaces	Ellsworth Vines; Don Budge; Ken Rosewall; Jimmy Connors; Mats Wilander; Andre Agassi; Roger Federer; Rafael Nadal; Novak Djokovic; Carlos Alcaraz	
Wembley Professional Championships	Won 4 consecutive titles overall (1964–67)	Ken Rosewall	
Pro Tournaments	Most singles titles, pro tournaments, 70 (1963–68)	**Stands alone**	
Career all tournaments	200 career titles (1956–76)	**Stands alone**	
Career all tournaments	288 career finals. (200+ titles, 88 runners-up) (1956–76)	**Stands alone**	
Career all tournaments	30 finals in a single season (1965)	**Stands alone**	
Career all tournaments	55 career indoor titles (1963–75)	**Stands alone**	
Career all tournaments	81 career indoor finals (1963–75)	**Stands alone**	
Career all tournaments	15+ title in 6 seasons (1962, 65, 66, 67, 69, 70)	**Stands alone**	
Career all tournaments	7 consecutive 10+ title seasons (1964–70)	**Stands alone**	
Career all tournaments	16 consecutive 5+ title seasons (1960–75)	**Stands alone**	
Career all tournaments	21 consecutive 1+ title seasons (1956–76)	Ken Rosewall	
Career all tournaments	147 match wins in a single season (1961)	**Stands alone**	
Career all tournaments	114 outdoor titles	Anthony Wilding	

Notes on sources: John Bercow's book Tennis Maestros: The Twenty Greatest Male Tennis Players of All Time confirms in chapter 9 Rod Laver's titles for the following years 1962 (22), 1965 (17), 1966 (16), 1967 (19), 1970 (15), 1971 (7), 1972 (5), 1973 (7), 1974 (6). The ITF confirms titles in 1975 (5) titles.

=== Open Era records ===
**Championship**	**Years**	Record accomplished	**Player tied**	Reference
Australian Open–US Open	1969	Grand Slam	**Stands alone**	
Wimbledon; Australian Open; French Open; US Open	1968; 1969; 1969; 1969	Career Grand Slam	Andre Agassi; Roger Federer; Rafael Nadal; Novak Djokovic Carlos Alcaraz	
Grand Slam tournaments	1969	100% (26–0) match winning percentage in 1 season	Jimmy Connors	
Grand Slam tournaments	1969	All 4 finals in a calendar year	Roger Federer; Novak Djokovic; Jannik Sinner	
Combined tours	1968–70	3 consecutive years with 10+ titles	Roger Federer	
Combined tours	1969	18 titles in 1 season	**Stands alone**	
Grand Prix Tour	1969–75	90% (18–2) career match winning percentage in hard court finals	**Stands alone**	
Grand Prix Tour	1968–75	38 titles at age 30+	**Stands alone**	

== See also ==
- All-time tennis records – men's singles
- Open Era tennis records – men's singles

== Sources ==
- Barrett, John; Maskell, Dan (1989). Oh, I say!. London: Fontana. ISBN 0-00-637434-4.
- FitzSimons, Peter (2006). Great Australian Sports Champions. Harper Collins Publishers. ISBN 0-7322-8517-8.
- Bercow, John (2014). Tennis Maestros: The Twenty Greatest Male Tennis Players of All Time, Biteback Publishing, ASIN: B00KPSCV40
- Bellamy, Rex (1990). Love Thirty. Three Decades of Champions.
- Collins, Bud; Laver, Rodney George (1973). The Education of a Tennis Player. New York: Simon and Schuster. ISBN 0-671-21533-7.
- Collins, Bud; Hollander, Zander (1997). Bud Collins' Tennis Encyclopedia (3rd ed.). Detroit: Visible Ink Press. ISBN 978-1578590001.
- Collins, Bud (2016). The Bud Collins History of Tennis (3rd ed.). New York: New Chapter Press. ISBN 978-1-937559-38-0.
- Deford, Frank; Kramer, Jack (1979). The Game: My 40 Years in Tennis. New York: Putnam. ISBN 0-399-12336-9.
- Geist, Robert (1999). Der Grösste Meister. Die denkwürdige Karriere des australischen Tennisspielers Kenneth Robert Rosewall.
- Heldman, Julius. The Style of Rod Laver. In Phillips, Caryl (1999). The Right Set: A Tennis Anthology. New York: Vintage Books. ISBN 0-375-70646-1.
- Laver, Betty (2001). Rod Laver: The Red-headed Rocket from Rockhampton. Gladstone, Qld: Betty Laver. ISBN 0-9579932-0-X.
- McCauley, Joe (2003). The History of Professional Tennis. Windsor: The Short Run Book Company Limited.
- Newcombe, John; Writer, Larry (2002). Newk – Life on and Off the Court.
- Sutter, Michel (1992). Vainqueurs-Winners 1946–1991 (forewords by Arthur Ashe and Mark Miles).
- Trengove, Alan (2003). Advantage Australia. Rod Laver and Margaret Court: Legends of the Grand Slam.
- Laver, Rod; Writer, Larry (2014). Rod Laver : An Autobiography. London: Allen & Unwin. ISBN 978-1-76011-124-3. OCLC 887686666.

Awards and achievements
Preceded by (Soviet Union) Ludmila Belousova and Oleg Protopopov	BBC Overseas Sports Personality of the Year; 1969	Succeeded by (Brazil) Pelé
