= List of United States Davis Cup team representatives =

This is a list of tennis players who have represented the United States Davis Cup team in an official Davis Cup match. The United States has taken part in the Davis Cup since 1901. Statistics correct as of 18 September 2017.

== Players ==
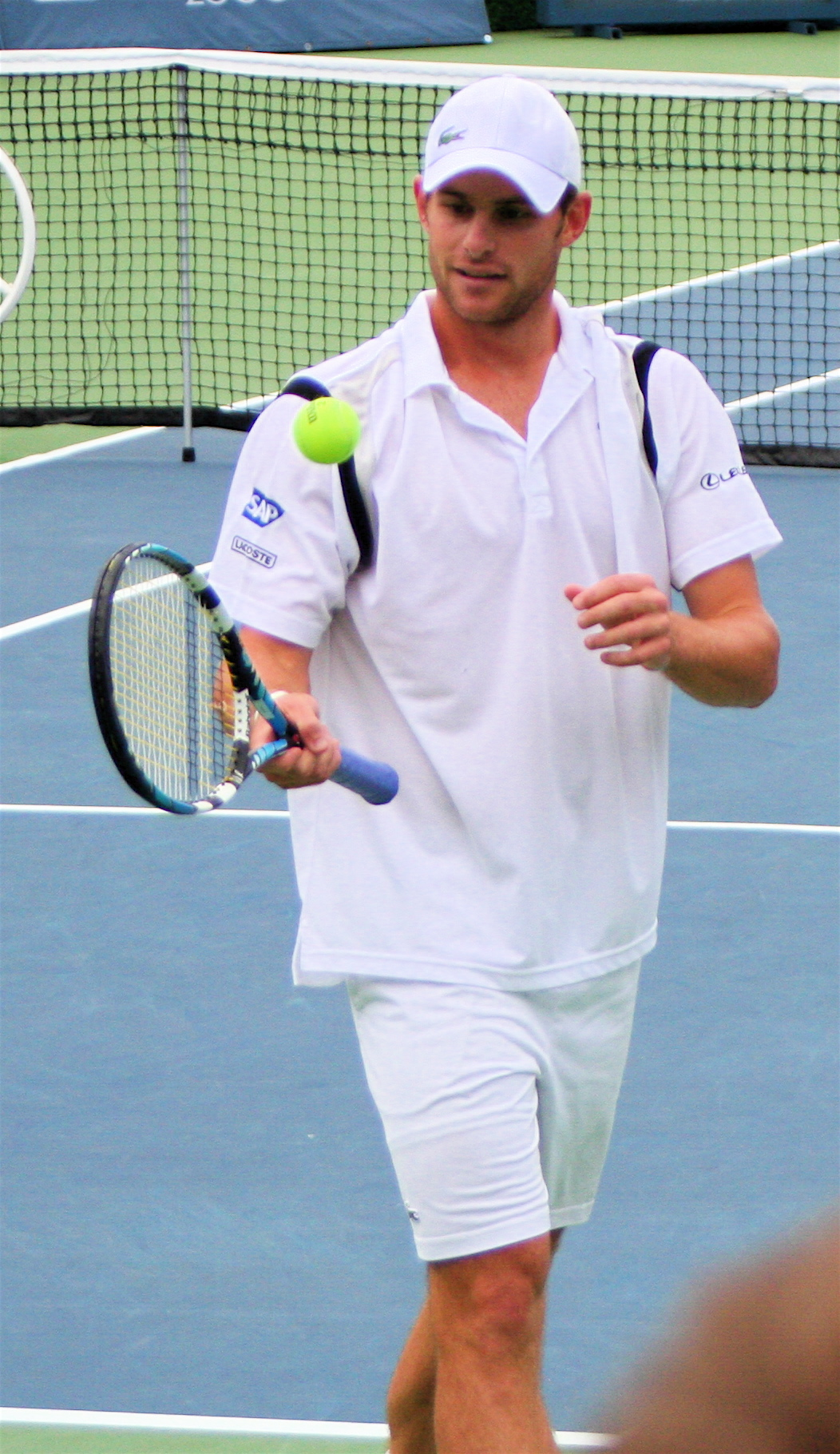
Andy Roddick

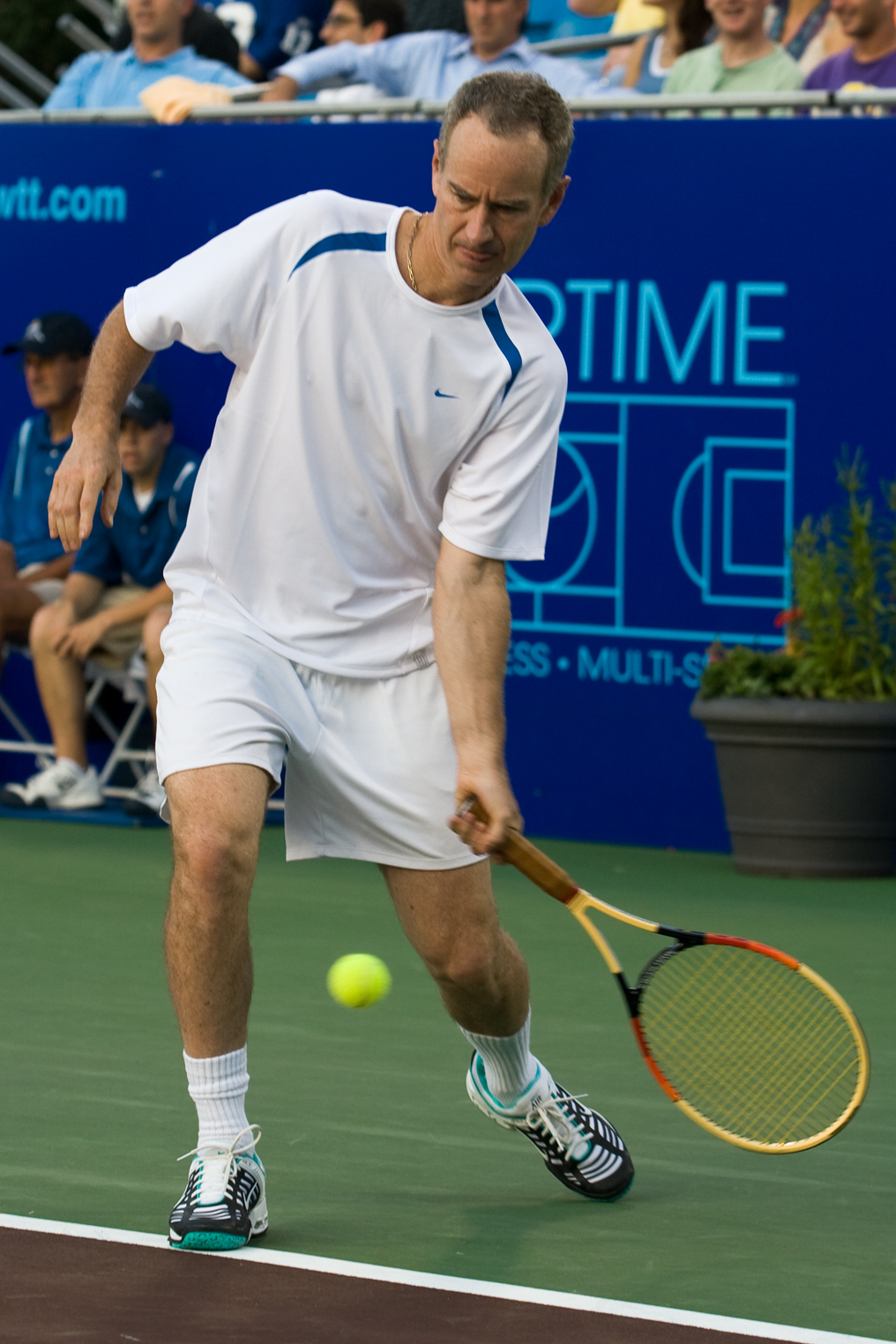
John McEnroe

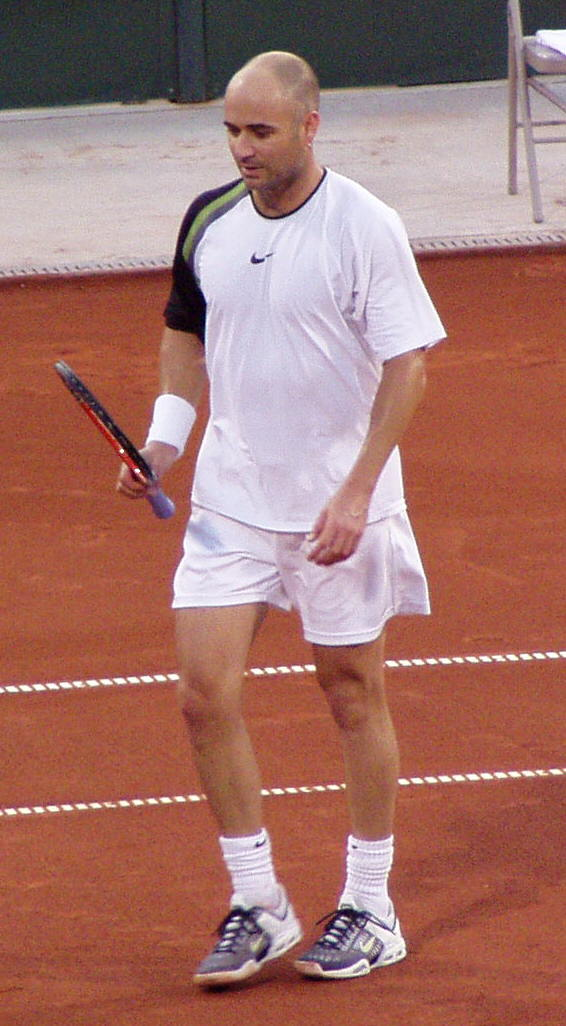
Andre Agassi

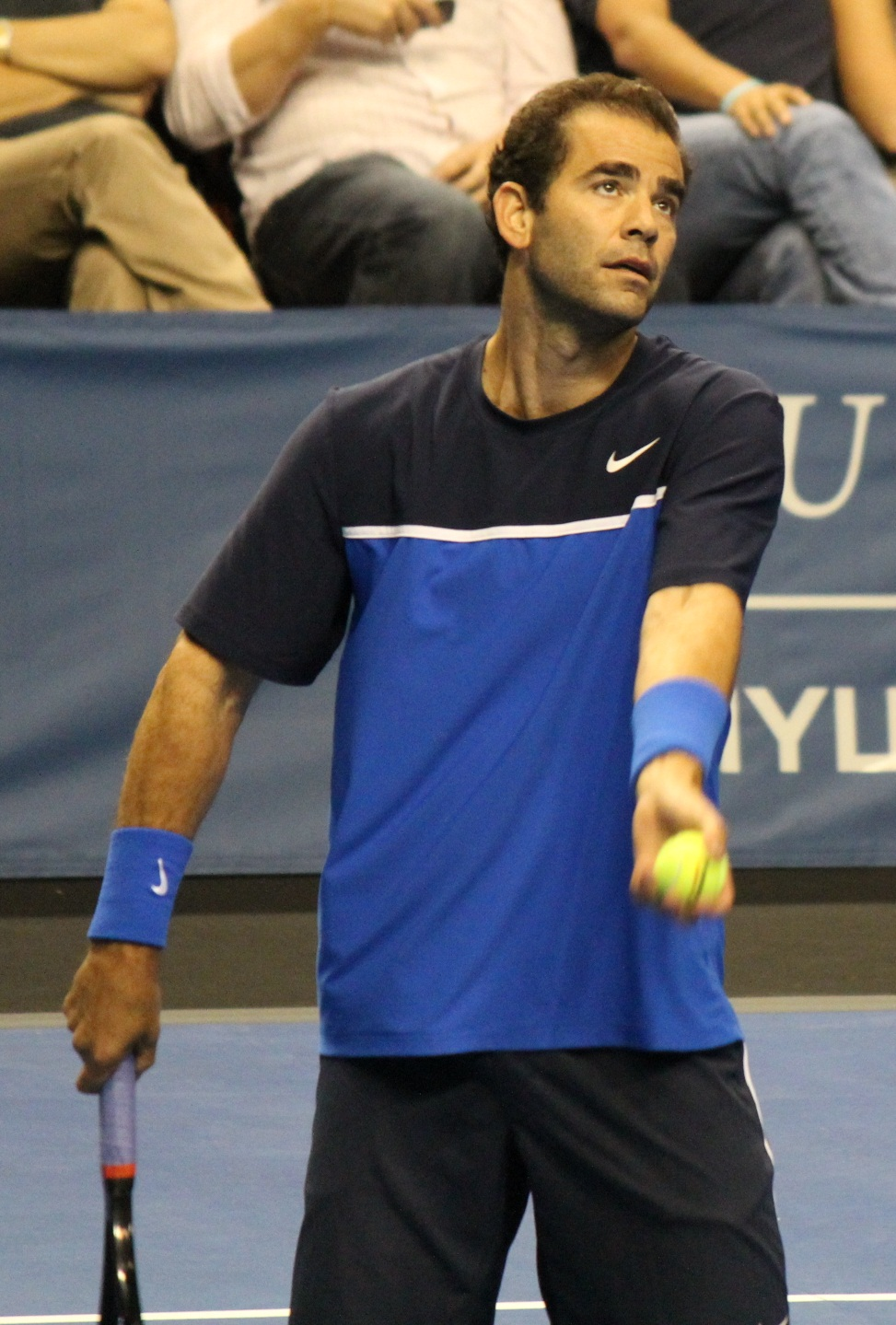
Pete Sampras

Player	Total W–L	Singles W–L	Doubles W–L	Ties played	Debut
Andre Agassi	30–6	30–6	0–0	22	1988
Fred Alexander	1–3	0–2	1–1	2	1908
Wilmer Allison	32–12	18–10	14–2	24	1928
Paul Annacone	1–0	0–0	1–0	1	1986
Jimmy Arias	1–4	1–4	0–0	3	1984
Arthur Ashe	28–6	27–5	1–1	18	1963
Tut Bartzen	16–0	15–0	1–0	9	1952
Karl Behr	1–2	0–2	1–0	1	1907
Jay Berger	2–0	2–0	0–0	2	1908
James Blake	21–12	18–11	3–2	17	2000
Tom Brown	3–1	2–1	1–0	2	1950
Bob Bryan	30–7	4–2	26–5	31	2003
Mike Bryan	28–6	0–1	28–5	33	2003
Butch Buchholz	6–3	3–1	3–2	6	1959
Don Budge	25–4	19–2	6–2	11	1935
Thomas Bundy	0–2	0–0	0–2	2	1911
Harold Burrows	4–0	2–0	2–0	2	1954
Michael Chang	8–4	8–4	0–0	6	1989
Straight Clark	5–0	3–0	2–0	3	1953
William Clothier	4–1	4–1	0–0	3	1905
Wilbur Coen	2–0	1–0	1–0	2	1928
Jimmy Connors	10–3	10–3	0–0	7	1976
Jim Courier	17–10	16–10	1–0	14	1991
Christopher Crawford	2–0	2–0	0–0	1	1961
Scott Davis	0–2	0–1	0–1	2	1980
Dwight F. Davis	2–1	1–0	1–1	2	1900
Donald Dell	3–1	1–0	2–1	3	1961
Taylor Dent	0–1	0–1	0–0	1	2003
John Doeg	2–0	2–0	0–0	2	1930
Jon Douglas	6–3	5–3	1–0	5	1958
Mardy Fish	11–8	7–7	4–1	11	2002
Ken Flach	11–2	0–0	11–2	13	1985
Herbie Flam	12–2	10–2	2–0	8	1952
Peter Fleming	14–1	0–0	14–1	15	1979
Allen Fox	2–0	2–0	0–0	1	1963
Taylor Fritz	6–3	6–3	0–0	9	2019
Frank Froehling	3–3	3–3	0–0	3	1963
Patrick Galbraith	1–1	0–0	1–1	2	1996
Jan-Michael Gambill	2–5	2–4	0–1	3	1998
Reynaldo Garrido	5–13	5–13	1–4	8	1951
Vitas Gerulaitis	11–3	11–3	0–0	7	1977
Sam Giammalva	7–3	4–1	3–2	7	1956
Brad Gilbert	10–5	10–5	0–0	8	1986
Justin Gimelstob	0–3	0–1	0–2	2	1998
Robby Ginepri	2–0	2–0	0–0	1	2004
Grant Golden	2–1	1–1	1–0	2	1957
Pancho Gonzales	2–0	2–0	0–0	1	1949
Tom Gorman	8–5	7–5	1–0	7	1972
Brian Gottfried	7–7	6–7	1–0	7	1975
Jim Grabb	0–1	0–0	0–1	1	1993
Clark Graebner	16–4	11–2	5–2	11	1965
Bryan Grant	8–2	8–2	0–0	5	1935
Michael Green	1–2	1–2	0–0	3	1956
Harold Hackett	5–1	0–0	5–1	6	1908
Ryan Harrison	5–2	2–2	3–0	5	2012
John F. Hennessey	14–2	11–2	3–0	8	1928
Ron Holmberg	1–0	0–0	1–0	1	1956
Joseph Hunt	0–1	0–0	0–1	1	1939
Frank Hunter	4–2	3–1	1–1	4	1927
John Isner	17–13	15–13	2–0	18	2010
Donald Johnson	0–1	0–0	0–1	1	2001
Steve Johnson	5–3	1–3	4–0	5	2015
Wallace F. Johnson	1–0	1–0	0–0	1	1913
Bill Johnston	18–3	14–3	4–0	10	1920
Arnold Jones	1–0	0–0	1–0	1	1928
Jack Kramer	7–2	6–0	1–2	4	1939
Aaron Krickstein	6–4	6–4	0–0	5	1985
William Larned	9–5	9–5	0–0	8	1902
Arthur Larsen	4–0	4–0	0–0	3	1951
Rick Leach	7–4	0–1	7–3	10	1990
Raymond Little	3–5	1–3	2–2	4	1906
Melville Long	0–3	0–2	0–1	1	1909
George Lott	18–4	7–4	11–0	18	1928
Bob Lutz	15–2	1–0	14–2	16	1968
Barry MacKay (tennis)	22–9	17–7	5–2	15	1956
Gene Mako	6–3	0–1	6–2	8	1935
Todd Martin	16–14	11–8	5–6	18	1994
Gene Mayer	4–2	4–2	0–0	3	1982
Tim Mayotte	1–4	1–4	0–0	3	1986
John McEnroe	59–10	41–8	18–2	30	1978
Patrick McEnroe	3–1	0–0	3–1	4	1993
Chuck McKinley	29–9	16–6	13–3	16	1960
Maurice McLoughlin	12–8	9–4	3–4	8	1909
Fred McNair	2–1	0–0	2–1	3	1977
Gardnar Mulloy	11–3	3–0	8–3	12	1946
Alex O'Brien	2–5	1–1	1–4	5	1997
Alex Olmedo	7–2	5–1	2–1	3	1958
Reilly Opelka	3–4	3–3	0–1	7	2019
Jared Palmer	3–4	1–0	2–4	6	1994
Frank Parker	12–2	12–2	0–0	7	1937
Charlie Pasarell	6–1	3–0	3–1	5	1966
David Pate	0–1	0–0	0–1	1	1991
Budge Patty	2–0	1–0	1–0	1	1951
Tommy Paul	5–4	5–3	0–1	9	2020
Robert Perry	2–1	1–1	1–0	2	1952
Jim Pugh	6–0	0–0	6–0	6	1990
Sam Querrey	12–9	10–9	2–0	16	2008
William Quillian	2–0	1–0	1–0	1	1958
Dennis Ralston	25–9	14–5	11–4	15	1960
Whitney Reed	2–4	2–3	0–1	3	1958
Richey Reneberg	6–3	1–0	5–3	8	1993
Vincent Richards	4–1	2–0	2–1	4	1922
Hamilton Richardson	20–2	17–1	3–1	14	1952
Cliff Richey	10–3	10–3	0–0	7	1966
Marty Riessen	7–3	3–1	4–2	8	1963
Bobby Riggs	2–2	2–2	0–0	2	1938
Joey Rive	0–3	0–2	0–1	1	1993
Andy Roddick	33–12	33–12	0–0	25	2001
Pete Sampras	19–9	15–8	4–1	16	1991
Dick Savitt	3–0	3–0	0–0	2	1951
Ted Schroeder	13–6	11–3	2–3	8	1946
Eugene Scott	4–0	3–0	1–0	2	1963
Robert Seguso	10–2	0–0	10–2	12	1985
Victor Elias Seixas	38–17	24–12	14–5	23	1951
Frank Shields	19–6	16–6	3–0	13	1931
Stan Smith	35–7	15–4	20–3	24	1968
Jack Sock	12–6	4–3	8–3	15	2015
Harold Solomon	9–4	9–4	0–0	7	1971
Vince Spadea	0–1	0–1	0–0	1	2000
Jonathan Stark	1–5	1–1	0–4	4	1994
Hugh Stewart	4–0	2–0	2–0	2	1952
Sherwood Stewart	2–2	0–0	2–2	4	1977
Dick Stockton	5–5	4–3	1–2	7	1973
Lester Stoefen	6–0	3–0	3–0	4	1934
Clifford Sutter	3–0	3–0	0–0	2	1931
Bill Talbert	9–1	2–0	7–1	8	1946
Roscoe Tanner	9–4	9–4	0–0	7	1975
Eliot Teltscher	5–4	5–4	0–0	5	1982
Frances Tiafoe	1–5	1–5	0–0	5	2018
Bill Tilden	34–7	25–5	9–2	17	1920
Tony Trabert	27–8	16–5	11–3	14	1951
Erik van Dillen	12–6	1–3	11–3	14	1971
John Van Ryn	29–3	7–1	22–2	24	1929
Ellsworth Vines	13–3	13–3	0–0	8	1932
Holcombe Ward	7–7	3–4	4–3	7	1900
Watson Washburn	1–0	0–0	1–0	1	1921
MaliVai Washington	3–2	3–2	0–0	3	1993
David Wheaton	1–1	1–1	0–0	1	1993
Malcolm Whitman	3–0	3–0	0–0	2	1900
R. Norris Williams	10–3	6–3	4–0	9	1913
Sidney Wood	8–6	5–6	3–0	7	1931
Chris Woodruff	1–2	1–1	0–1	2	2000
George Wrenn	0–1	0–0	0–1	1	1903
Robert Wrenn	0–3	0–2	0–1	1	1903
Beals Wright	9–7	6–4	3–3	7	1905
Donald Young	1–2	1–2	0–0	2	2014
Sebastian Korda	2–0	2–0	0–0	2	2022
Brandon Nakashima	3–0	3–0	0–0	3	2024
Mackenzie McDonald	3–1	3–1	0–0	4	2023
Christopher Eubanks	1–0	1–0	0–0	1	2024
Rajeev Ram	10–3	0–0	10–3	13	2021
Austin Krajicek	6–2	0–0	6–2	8	2023
Denis Kudla	1–0	1–0	0–0	1	2023
