= 1958 U.S. National Championships – Men's singles =

Men's singles
- 1958 U.S. National Championships

Final
- Champion: (Australia) Ashley Cooper
- Runner-up: (Australia) Mal Anderson
- Score: 6–2, 3–6, 4–6, 10–8, 8–6

Events
Singles	men	women
Doubles	men	women
- U.S. National Championships

Ashley Cooper defeated Mal Anderson 6–2, 3–6, 4–6, 10–8, 8–6 in the final to win the men's singles tennis title at the 1958 U.S. National Championships.

== Seeds ==
The seeded players are listed below. Ashley Cooper is the champion; others show the round in which they were eliminated.

1. (Australia) Mal Anderson (finalist)
2. (Australia) Ashley Cooper (champion)
3. (United States) Ham Richardson (fourth round)
4. (Australia) Neale Fraser (semifinals)
5. (United States) Barry MacKay (tennis) (second round)
6. (United States) Alex Olmedo (quarterfinals)
7. (Denmark) Kurt Nielsen (first round)
8. (United States) Dick Savitt (quarterfinals)

== Draw ==
=== Key ===
- Q = Qualifier
- WC = Wild card
- LL = Lucky loser
- r = Retired

=== Final eight ===
Quarterfinals
(United States) Herbie Flam	5	6	6
(Sweden) Ulf Schmidt	7	8	8
8	(United States) Dick Savitt	16	1	6	3
1	(Australia) Mal Anderson	18	6	3	6
6	(United States) Alex Olmedo	6	1	6	6	3
4	(Australia) Neale Fraser	3	6	8	3	6
(United States) Vic Seixas	7	2	6	2
2	(Australia) Ashley Cooper	9	6	3	6

Semifinals
(Sweden) Ulf Schmidt	4	5	2
1	(Australia) Mal Anderson	6	7	6
4	(Australia) Neale Fraser	6	6	1
2	(Australia) Ashley Cooper	8	8	6

Final
1	(Australia) Mal Anderson	2	6	6	8	6
2	(Australia) Ashley Cooper	6	3	4	10	8

=== Earlier rounds ===
==== Section 1 ====
First round
(Japan) Kamo	0	1	6	4
(United States) Bartzen	6	6	2	6
(United States) Beck	3	6	6	3	3
(Argentina) Rios	6	1	2	6	6
(United States) Howe	14	3	1
(Australia) Kearney	16	6	6
(United States) Stewart	2	3	3
(United States) Flam	6	6	6
(United States) Stoesser	4	6	1	6	4
(United States) Brechner	6	3	6	2	6
(United States) Nagler	9	3	2	6	0
(Australia) Mark	7	6	6	2	6
(United States) Mulloy	6	4	4	3
(United States) Crawford	2	6	6	6
(United States) Shakespeare	2	1	2
5	(United States) MacKay	6	6	6

Second round
(United States) Bartzen	6	6	6
(Argentina) Rios	1	2	2
(Australia) Kearney	0	0	6
(United States) Flam	6	6	8
(United States) Brechner	6	3	2
(Australia) Mark	8	6	6
(United States) Crawford	6	3	6	6
5	(United States) MacKay	4	6	4	3

Third round
(United States) Bartzen	5	2	7
(United States) Flam	7	6	9
(Australia) Mark	6	6	3	4
(United States) Crawford	8	3	6	6

Fourth round
(United States) Flam	4	12	6	6
(United States) Crawford	6	10	1	4

==== Section 2 ====
First round
(United States) Fleitz	4	1	6	2
(United States) Nelson	6	6	4	6
(United States) Ogden	2	4	4
(Sweden) Schmidt	6	6	6
(United States) Gentry	3	1	3
(United States) Cullen	6	6	6
(United States) Cranston	4	7	0	2
(United States) Buchholz	6	5	6	6
(United States) Brownlow	0	4	6	3
(United States) Giammalva	6	6	4	6
(United States) Scott	5	4	4
(Canada) Bedard	7	6	6
(United States) Junta	18	5	4
(United States) Bond	20	7	6
(United States) Vincent	4	1	1
3	(United States) Richardson	6	6	6

Second round
(United States) Nelson	2	3	2
(Sweden) Schmidt	6	6	6
(United States) Cullen	1	6	1	5
(United States) Buchholz	6	1	6	7
(United States) Giammalva	10	3	6	7	7
(Canada) Bedard	18	6	8	5	5
(United States) Bond	3	5	3
3	(United States) Richardson	6	7	6

Third round
(Sweden) Schmidt	19	6	3	6
(United States) Buchholz	17	3	6	1
(United States) Giammalva	5	4	3
3	(United States) Richardson	7	6	6

Fourth round
(Sweden) Schmidt	10	6	11
3	(United States) Richardson	8	4	9

==== Section 3 ====
First round
(United States) Froehling	2	3	5
(Australia) Laver	6	6	7
(United States) Neely	5	0	0
(Argentina) Morea	7	6	6
(United States) Rubell	3	4	6	0
(United States) Werksman	6	6	2	6
(United States) Buck	6	5	2	2
(United States) Hettleman	4	7	6	6
(Canada) Harit	2	4	3
(United States) Harum	6	6	6
(United States) Jenkins	2	0	4
(United States) Hoehn	6	6	6
(United States) Moss	0	6	4	1
(United States) Henry	6	4	6	6
(Canada) Main	3	1	4
8	(United States) Savitt	6	6	6

Second round
(Australia) Laver	8	6	6
(Argentina) Morea	6	0	4
(United States) Werksman	6	6	0	4	8
(United States) Hettleman	1	3	6	6	6
(United States) Harum	6	6	6
(United States) Hoehn	4	0	1
(United States) Henry	2	2	8	4
8	(United States) Savitt	6	6	6	6

Third round
(Australia) Laver	6	7	6
(United States) Werksman	4	5	0
(United States) Harum	4	1	6
8	(United States) Savitt	6	6	8

Fourth round
(Australia) Laver	6	7	4
8	(United States) Savitt	8	9	6

==== Section 4 ====
First round
(United States) Senkowski	2	4	6	3
(United States) Fox	6	6	3	6
(United States) Frost	3	3	8	6	5
(United Kingdom) Knight	6	6	6	4	7
(United States) Ralston	6	6	1	5	3
(United States) Sledge	1	3	6	7	6
(United States) Patty	2	2	7	3
(United States) Reed	6	6	5	6
(United States) Sample	0	4	1
(United States) McKinley	6	6	6
(United States) Perry	0	4	1
(United States) Quillian	6	6	6
(United States) Atkinson	8	1	6	1	3
(Peru) Buse	6	6	0	6	6
(United States) Perry	6	1	2	1
1	(Australia) Anderson	4	6	6	6

Second round
(United States) Fox	1	3	6
(United Kingdom) Knight	6	6	8
(United States) Sledge	1	4	10
(United States) Reed	6	6	12
(United States) McKinley	4	13	2
(United States) Quillian	6	15	6
(Peru) Buse	1	2	5
1	(Australia) Anderson	6	6	7

Third round
(United Kingdom) Knight	4	6	6	6
(United States) Reed	6	4	3	2
(United States) Quillian	6	3	2
1	(Australia) Anderson	8	6	6

Fourth round
(United Kingdom) Knight	6	3	4	6
1	(Australia) Anderson	4	6	6	8

==== Section 5 ====
First round
(United States) Quesada	6	1	3
(United States) Longshore	8	6	6
(United States) Hobbs	6	0	1	5
(United States) Schmidt	3	6	6	7
(United States) Johnson	2	2	4
(United States) Capell	6	6	6
(United States) Wood	3	1	1
(United States) Palmer	6	6	6
(United States) Riessen	w/o
(United States) Holmberg
(United States) Ottum	1	1	4
(United States) Brown	6	6	6
(Australia) O'Kane	7	12	9	5
(United States) Grant	9	10	11	7
(United States) Sorlien	2	3	1
6	(United States) Olmedo	6	6	6

Second round
(United States) Longshore	6	6	6
(United States) Schmidt	2	4	4
(United States) Capell	1	6	6	7
(United States) Palmer	6	3	4	5
(United States) Holmberg	6	4	6	6
(United States) Brown	4	6	1	2
(United States) Grant	1	4	4
6	(United States) Olmedo	6	6	6

Third round
(United States) Longshore	6	6	6
(United States) Capell	3	4	4
(United States) Holmberg	3	3	4
6	(United States) Olmedo	6	6	6

Fourth round
(United States) Longshore	2	3	3
6	(United States) Olmedo	6	6	6

==== Section 6 ====
First round
(Israel) Avidan-Weiss	1	0	2
(United States) Golden	6	6	6
(United States) Susman	5	6	4	2
(United States) Davis	7	3	6	6
(United States) Gilmore	0	1	0
(United States) Andrews	6	6	6
(United States) Clark	4	4	1
(Argentina) Soriano	6	6	6
(United States) Corley	3	3	1
(United States) Dell	6	6	6
(United States) Cranis	4	4	2
(Canada) Fontana	6	6	6
(United States) Roberts	0	3	5
(United Kingdom) Davies	6	6	7
(United States) Henderson	0	2	6
4	(Australia) Fraser	6	6	8

Second round
(United States) Golden	6	6	6
(United States) Davis	0	0	0
(United States) Andrews	17	6	8
(Argentina) Soriano	15	2	6
(United States) Dell	6	6	6
(Canada) Fontana	3	0	4
(United Kingdom) Davies	4	5	3
4	(Australia) Fraser	6	7	6

Third round
(United States) Golden	7	6	6
(United States) Andrews	5	4	1
(United States) Dell	3	6	4	2
4	(Australia) Fraser	6	4	6	6

Fourth round
(United States) Golden	4	1	4
4	(Australia) Fraser	6	6	6

==== Section 7 ====
First round
(United States) Wertheimer	6	2	3	6	4
(United States) Thompson	3	6	6	3	6
(United States) Van Rensselaer	3	1	2
(United States) Green	6	6	6
(United States) Schoop	2	3	10
(United States) Hoogs	6	6	12
(Mexico) Donnadieu	2	3	6	6
(United States) Hernando	6	6	3	8
(United States) Vinton	0	3	2
(United States) Bowditch	6	6	6
(United States) Dubie	6	7	1	1	4
(United States) Douglas	2	5	6	6	6
(United States) Eisenberg	3	6	4	3
(United States) Clark	6	4	6	6
7	(Denmark) Nielsen	2	6	4	10	6
(United States) Seixas	6	4	6	8	8

Second round
(United States) Thompson	2	5	2
(United States) Green	6	7	6
(United States) Hoogs	3	1	6	2
(United States) Hernando	6	6	4	6
(United States) Bowditch	2	9	2	2
(United States) Douglas	6	7	6	6
(United States) Clark	3	1	4
(United States) Seixas	6	6	6

Third round
(United States) Green	6	6	6
(United States) Hernando	1	3	0
(United States) Douglas	6	8	4	4
(United States) Seixas	4	10	6	6

Fourth round
(United States) Green	2	5	6
(United States) Seixas	6	7	8

==== Section 8 ====
First round
(United States) Sweeney	0	1	2
(United States) Schwartz	6	6	6
(United States) Erickson	0	1	4
(United States) Franks	6	6	6
(Israel) Davidman	2	2	4
(United States) Farrin	6	6	6
(United States) Fisher	6	4	6	8	3
(United States) Hoffman Jr	3	6	8	6	6
(United States) Cunningham	1	4	4
(United States) Weld	6	6	6
(Canada) Rochon	1	9	1	4
(United States) Crane	6	7	6	6
(United States) Wright	0	1	1
(Chile) Ayala	6	6	6
(United States) Davis	1	2	4
2	(Australia) Cooper	6	6	6

Second round
(United States) Schwartz	0	2	6	0
(United States) Franks	6	6	1	6
(United States) Farrin	6	6	8	5	6
(United States) Hoffman Jr	1	8	6	7	2
(United States) Weld	4	3	1
(United States) Crane	6	6	6
(Chile) Ayala	4	2	3
2	(Australia) Cooper	6	6	6

Third round
(United States) Franks	6	6	10
(United States) Farrin	2	3	8
(United States) Crane	2	0	0
2	(Australia) Cooper	6	6	6

Fourth round
(United States) Franks	1	2	4
2	(Australia) Cooper	6	6	6

Preceded by 1958 Wimbledon Championships – Men's singles	Grand Slam men's singles	Succeeded by 1959 Australian Championships – Men's singles
