= 1958 Davis Cup America Zone =

International tennis competition

The America Zone was one of the three regional zones of the 1958 Davis Cup.

7 teams entered the America Zone, with the winner going on to compete in the Inter-Zonal Zone against the winners of the Eastern Zone and Europe Zone. The United States defeated Argentina in the final and progressed to the Inter-Zonal Zone.

== Draw ==
Quarterfinals; 16–18 May; 4–12 July
Israel
bye
Buenos Aires, Argentina (clay)
Argentina	5
Caribbean/West Indies	0
Toronto, Canada (clay)
Canada	5
Cuba	0
Caracas, Venezuela
Venezuela	0
United States	5

Semifinals; 11–21 July
Buenos Aires, Argentina (clay)
Israel	0
Argentina	5
Toronto, Canada (clay)
Canada	0
United States	5

Final; 15–18 August
Rye, NY, United States (grass)
Argentina	0
United States	5

== Quarterfinals ==
=== Argentina vs. Caribbean/West Indies ===
Argentina
5
Buenos Aires Lawn Tennis Club, Buenos Aires, Argentina
10–12 July 1958
Clay

Caribbean/West Indies
0

			1	2	3	4	5
1	(Argentina) (Cricket West Indies)	Enrique Morea; Peter Philips	6; 2	6; 2	6; 2
2	(Argentina) (Cricket West Indies)	Eduardo Soriano; Peter Valdez	6; 2	7; 5	6; 1
3	(Argentina) (Cricket West Indies)	Alejo Russell / Eduardo Soriano; Peter Philips / Peter Valdez	6; 1	6; 3	6; 4
4	(Argentina) (Cricket West Indies)	Enrique Morea; Peter Valdez	10; 8	6; 3	6; 3
5	(Argentina) (Cricket West Indies)	Ernesto Rios; Peter Philips	6; 3	6; 4	6; 3

=== Canada vs. Cuba ===
Canada
5
Toronto CS&C Club, Toronto, Canada
4–6 July 1958
Clay

Cuba
0

			1	2	3	4	5
1	(Canada) (Cuba)	Don Fontana; Raúl Karman	6; 2	6; 2	6; 3
2	(Canada) (Cuba)	Robert Bédard; Adolfo Miñoso	6; 1	6; 0	6; 0
3	(Canada) (Cuba)	Robert Bédard / Don Fontana; Raúl Karman / Adolfo Miñoso	6; 2	6; 2	6; 4
4	(Canada) (Cuba)	Robert Bédard; Raúl Karman	6; 2	6; 1	6; 3
5	(Canada) (Cuba)	Paul Willey; Adolfo Miñoso	6; 2	6; 1	6; 3

=== Venezuela vs. United States ===
Venezuela
0
Altamira Tennis Club, Caracas, Venezuela
16–18 May 1958

United States
5

			1	2	3	4	5
1	(Venezuela) (United States)	Isaías Pimentel; Ham Richardson	2; 6	1; 6	3; 6
2	(Venezuela) (United States)	Marcos Gambus; Barry MacKay (tennis)	4; 6	1; 6	2; 6
3	(Venezuela) (United States)	Marcos Gambus / Isaías Pimentel; Barry MacKay (tennis) / William Quillian	1; 6	4; 6	5; 7
4	(Venezuela) (United States)	Isaías Pimentel; Barry MacKay (tennis)	3; 6	4; 6	7; 5	6; 1	1; 6
5	(Venezuela) (United States)	Manuel Suárez; William Quillian	0; 6	0; 6	1; 6

== Semifinals ==
=== Argentina vs. Israel ===
Argentina
5
Buenos Aires Lawn Tennis Club, Buenos Aires, Argentina
19–21 July 1958
Clay

Israel
0

			1	2	3	4	5
1	(Argentina) (Israel)	Eduardo Soriano; Eleazar Davidman	6; 3	2; 6	6; 1	6; 0
2	(Argentina) (Israel)	Enrique Morea; Arie Avidan-Weiss	6; 3	6; 2	6; 2
3	(Argentina) (Israel)	Enrique Morea / Eduardo Soriano; Arie Avidan-Weiss / Eleazar Davidman	6; 3	6; 3	6; 2
4	(Argentina) (Israel)	Eduardo Soriano; Arie Avidan-Weiss	6; 1	6; 3	6; 1
5	(Argentina) (Israel)	Enrique Morea; Eleazar Davidman	7; 5	3; 6	6; 4	7; 5

=== Canada vs. United States ===
Canada
0
Toronto CS&C Club, Toronto, Canada
11–13 July 1958
Clay

United States
5

			1	2	3	4	5
1	(Canada) (United States)	Don Fontana; Barry MacKay (tennis)	1; 6	2; 6	5; 7
2	(Canada) (United States)	Robert Bédard; Whitney Reed	7; 9	2; 6	4; 6
3	(Canada) (United States)	Robert Bédard / Don Fontana; Sam Giammalva / Barry MacKay (tennis)	1; 6	11; 13	4; 6
4	(Canada) (United States)	Paul Willey; Barry MacKay (tennis)	8; 6	2; 6	10; 12	5; 7
5	(Canada) (United States)	Don Fontana; Jon Douglas	6; 4	3; 6	3; 6	1; 6

== Final ==
=== United States vs. Argentina ===
United States
5
Westchester Country Club, Rye, NY, United States
15–18 August 1958
Grass

Argentina
0

			1	2	3	4	5
1	(United States) (Argentina)	Barry MacKay (tennis); Eduardo Soriano	6; 2	6; 2	3; 6	6; 3
2	(United States) (Argentina)	Ham Richardson; Enrique Morea	6; 1	6; 2	7; 9	6; 2
3	(United States) (Argentina)	Sam Giammalva / Barry MacKay (tennis); Enrique Morea / Eduardo Soriano	6; 3	6; 2	6; 2
4	(United States) (Argentina)	Ham Richardson; Eduardo Soriano	6; 4	6; 2	7; 5
5	(United States) (Argentina)	Barry MacKay (tennis); Enrique Morea	6; 2	6; 2	6; 2
