= 1958 Davis Cup Europe Zone =

International tennis competition

Details
- Duration: 25 April 1958 – 3 August 1958
- Teams: 24
- Categories: 1958 Davis Cup America Zone; 1958 Davis Cup Eastern Zone; 1958 Davis Cup Europe Zone

Champion
- Winning nation: Italy; Qualified for: 1958 Davis Cup; Inter-Zonal Finals

The Europe Zone was one of the three regional zones of the 1958 Davis Cup.

24 teams entered the Europe Zone, with the winner going on to compete in the Inter-Zonal Zone against the winners of the America Zone and Eastern Zone. Italy defeated Great Britain in the final and progressed to the Inter-Zonal Zone.

== Draw ==
First Round; 25 April–4 May
Italy
bye
Monaco	0
India	5
Denmark
bye
Yugoslavia	0
Czechoslovakia	5
Mexico
bye
Luxembourg	0
Finland	5
Poland
bye
Switzerland	3
Austria	2
Turkey	1
Chile	4
bye
France
Egypt	1
Spain	4
bye
Sweden
Hungary	2
Brazil	3
bye
Great Britain
West Germany	4
Netherlands	0
bye
Belgium

Second Round; 15–20 May
Florence, Italy (clay)
Italy	3
India	2
Copenhagen, Denmark (clay)
Denmark	3
Czechoslovakia	2
Helsinki, Finland
Mexico	5
Finland	0
Lausanne, Switzerland
Poland	4
Switzerland	1
Paris, France (clay)
Chile	1
France	4
Barcelona, Spain (clay)
Spain	2
Sweden	3
Eastbourne, England (grass)
Brazil	0
Great Britain	5
Cologne, West Germany
West Germany	3
Belgium	2

Quarterfinals; 5–8 June
Copenhagen, Denmark (clay)
Italy	5
Denmark	0
Warsaw, Poland
Mexico	2
Poland	3
Paris, France (clay)
France	3
Sweden	2
Scarborough, England (grass)
Great Britain	5
West Germany	0

Semifinals; 18–21 July
Warsaw, Poland
Italy	4
Poland	1
Manchester, England (grass)
France	0
Great Britain	5

Final; 1–3 August
Milan, Italy (clay)
Italy	4
Great Britain	1

== First round ==
=== Monaco vs. India ===
Monaco
0
Monte Carlo, Monaco
25–27 April 1958

India
5

			1	2	3	4	5
1	(Monaco) (India)	Georges Pasquier; Ramanathan Krishnan	0; 6	1; 6	0; 6
2	(Monaco) (India)	Roland Borghini; Naresh Kumar	8; 6	2; 6	3; 6	4; 6
3	(Monaco) (India)	Roland Borghini / Georges Pasquier; Ramanathan Krishnan / Naresh Kumar	0; 6	1; 6	3; 6
4	(Monaco) (India)	Roland Borghini; Ramanathan Krishnan	7; 5	3; 6	2; 6	0; 6
5	(Monaco) (India)	Georges Pasquier; Akhtar Ali	3; 6	3; 6	4; 6

=== Yugoslavia vs. Czechoslovakia ===
Yugoslavia
0
Zagreb, Yugoslavia
25–27 April 1958

Czechoslovakia
5

			1	2	3	4	5
1	(Socialist Federal Republic of Yugoslavia) (Czechoslovakia)	Ivko Plećević; Jiří Javorský	4; 6	4; 6	4; 6
2	(Socialist Federal Republic of Yugoslavia) (Czechoslovakia)	Kamilo Keretić; Pavel Benda	3; 6	6; 4	6; 1	3; 6	4; 6
3	(Socialist Federal Republic of Yugoslavia) (Czechoslovakia)	Ilija Panajotović / Ivko Plećević; Jiří Javorský / Milan Nečas	6; 4	4; 6	3; 6	1; 6
4	(Socialist Federal Republic of Yugoslavia) (Czechoslovakia)	Kamilo Keretić; Jiří Javorský	2; 6	6; 8	6; 1	2; 6
5	(Socialist Federal Republic of Yugoslavia) (Czechoslovakia)	Ivko Plećević; Pavel Benda	6; 3	7; 5	1; 6	1; 6	5; 7

=== Luxembourg vs. Finland ===
Luxembourg
0
Mondorf-les-Bains, Luxembourg
25–27 April 1958

Finland
5

			1	2	3	4	5
1	(Luxembourg) (Finland)	Frank Baden; Reino Nyyssönen	3; 6	7; 5	2; 6	6; 3	5; 7
2	(Luxembourg) (Finland)	Gaston Wampach; Sakari Salo	2; 6	2; 6	6; 8
3	(Luxembourg) (Finland)	Frank Baden / Gaston Wampach; Reino Nyyssönen / Sakari Salo	1; 6	7; 5	6; 4	4; 6	4; 6
4	(Luxembourg) (Finland)	Frank Baden; Sakari Salo	2; 6	2; 6	6; 2	2; 6
5	(Luxembourg) (Finland)	Gaston Wampach; Reino Nyyssönen	6; 4	1; 6	3; 6	2; 6

=== Switzerland vs. Austria ===
Switzerland
3
Bern, Switzerland
2–4 May 1958

Austria
2

			1	2	3	4	5
1	(Switzerland) (Austria)	Martin Froesch; Franz Saiko	3; 6	6; 4	5; 7	4; 6
2	(Switzerland) (Austria)	Erwin Balestra; Franz Hainka	6; 4	6; 1	7; 5
3	(Switzerland) (Austria)	Paul Blondel / Martin Froesch; Peter Böck / Franz Hainka	6; 3	4; 6	6; 4	10; 8
4	(Switzerland) (Austria)	Erwin Balestra; Franz Saiko	7; 5	5; 7	1; 6	0; 6
5	(Switzerland) (Austria)	Martin Froesch; Franz Hainka	6; 0	6; 4	6; 1

=== Turkey vs. Chile ===
Turkey
1
Istanbul, Turkey
26–28 April 1958

Chile
4

			1	2	3	4	5
1	(Turkey) (Chile)	Suzan Gürel; Luis Ayala	1; 6	1; 6	2; 6
2	(Turkey) (Chile)	Nazmi Bari; Patricio Rodríguez	2; 6	8; 10	1; 6
3	(Turkey) (Chile)	Engin Balas / Nazmi Bari; Luis Ayala / Patricio Rodríguez	2; 6	3; 6	0; 6
4	(Turkey) (Chile)	Suzan Gürel; Patricio Rodríguez	2; 6	1; 6	2; 6
5	(Turkey) (Chile)	Nazmi Bari; Daniel Achondo	3; 6	3; 6	6; 3	6; 3	6; 0

=== Egypt vs. Spain ===
Egypt
1
Gezira Sporting Club, Cairo, Egypt
25–27 April 1958
Clay

Spain
4

			1	2	3	4	5
1	(Egypt) (Spain)	Ibrahim Badreldin-Sayed; Andrés Gimeno	4; 6	3; 6	3; 6
2	(Egypt) (Spain)	Adel Ismail; Manuel Santana	5; 7	1; 6	6; 1	4; 6
3	(Egypt) (Spain)	Ibrahim Badreldin-Sayed / Adel Ismail; Juan Manuel Couder / Andrés Gimeno	3; 6	3; 6	1; 6
4	(Egypt) (Spain)	Nabil Hassan; Andrés Gimeno	6; 3	1; 6	0; 6	1; 6
5	(Egypt) (Spain)	Ibrahim Badreldin-Sayed; Manuel Santana	6; 1	2; 6	2; 6	8; 6	6; 4

=== Hungary vs. Brazil ===
Hungary
2
Budapest, Hungary
25–27 April 1958

Brazil
3

			1	2	3	4	5
1	(Hungary) (Brazil)	András Ádám-Stolpa; Carlos Alberto Fernandes	2; 6	5; 7	4; 6
2	(Hungary) (Brazil)	István Gulyás; Ivo Ribeiro	6; 3	6; 3	5; 7	7; 5
3	(Hungary) (Brazil)	András Ádám-Stolpa / István Gulyás; Ronald Barnes / Carlos Alberto Fernandes	4; 6	6; 2	6; 3	2; 6	4; 6
4	(Hungary) (Brazil)	István Gulyás; Carlos Alberto Fernandes	2; 6	3; 6	2; 6
5	(Hungary) (Brazil)	András Ádám-Stolpa; Ivo Ribeiro	5; 7	6; 8	6; 4	6; 4	6; 4

=== West Germany vs. Netherlands ===
West Germany
4
Munich, West Germany
25–27 April 1958

Netherlands
0

			1	2	3	4	5
1	(West Germany) (Netherlands)	Rupert Huber; Pieter van Eijsden	6; 1	7; 5	6; 1
2	(West Germany) (Netherlands)	Wilhelm Bungert; Hans van Dalsum	7; 5	6; 4	6; 2
3	(West Germany) (Netherlands)	Wilhelm Bungert / Rupert Huber; Willem Maris / Hans van de Weg	6; 2	6; 4	6; 4
4	(West Germany) (Netherlands)	Wilhelm Bungert; Pieter van Eijsden	6; 3	9; 7	6; 8	6; 8	7; 5
5	(West Germany) (Netherlands)	Rupert Huber; Hans van Dalsum						not played

== Second round ==
=== Italy vs. India ===
Italy
3
Florence, Italy
15–18 May 1958
Clay

India
2

			1	2	3	4	5
1	(Italy) (India)	Nicola Pietrangeli; Naresh Kumar	8; 6	8; 6	10; 8
2	(Italy) (India)	Orlando Sirola; Ramanathan Krishnan	2; 6	7; 5	6; 3	6; 3
3	(Italy) (India)	Nicola Pietrangeli / Orlando Sirola; Ramanathan Krishnan / Naresh Kumar	1; 6	9; 7	4; 6	6; 2	6; 3
4	(Italy) (India)	Orlando Sirola; Naresh Kumar	7; 5	5; 7	6; 3	4; 6	4; 6
5	(Italy) (India)	Antonio Maggi; Ramanathan Krishnan	0; 6	6; 2	4; 6	2; 6

=== Denmark vs. Czechoslovakia ===
Denmark
3
Copenhagen, Denmark
15–17 May 1958
Clay

Czechoslovakia
2

			1	2	3	4	5
1	(Denmark) (Czechoslovakia)	Torben Ulrich; Pavel Benda	6; 1	6; 4	6; 0
2	(Denmark) (Czechoslovakia)	Kurt Nielsen; Jiří Javorský	6; 2	8; 10	7; 9	12; 10	6; 1
3	(Denmark) (Czechoslovakia)	Kurt Nielsen / Torben Ulrich; Jiří Javorský / Milan Nečas	4; 6	3; 6	4; 6
4	(Denmark) (Czechoslovakia)	Kurt Nielsen; Pavel Benda	5; 7	6; 4	6; 4	6; 2
5	(Denmark) (Czechoslovakia)	Jørgen Ulrich; Jiří Javorský	10; 8	3; 6	1; 6	6; 4	5; 7

=== Finland vs. Mexico ===
Finland
0
Helsinki, Finland
16–18 May 1958

Mexico
5

			1	2	3	4	5
1	(Finland) (Mexico)	Heikki Hedman; Francisco Contreras	3; 6	0; 6	2; 6
2	(Finland) (Mexico)	Sakari Salo; Mario Llamas	3; 6	6; 4	3; 6	7; 9
3	(Finland) (Mexico)	Matti Kinnunen / Sakari Salo; Rafael Osuna / Antonio Palafox	2; 6	1; 6	2; 6
4	(Finland) (Mexico)	Sakari Salo; Rafael Osuna	11; 9	12; 10	8; 10	3; 6	4; 6
5	(Finland) (Mexico)	Heikki Hedman; Antonio Palafox	5; 7	3; 6	5; 7

=== Switzerland vs. Poland ===
Switzerland
1
Lausanne, Switzerland
15–17 May 1958

Poland
4

			1	2	3	4	5
1	(Switzerland) (Poland)	Martin Froesch; Władysław Skonecki	4; 6	5; 7	4; 6
2	(Switzerland) (Poland)	Erwin Balestra; Andrzej Licis	2; 6	1; 6	0; 6
3	(Switzerland) (Poland)	Paul Blondel / Martin Froesch; Józef Piątek / Jan Radzio	6; 2	6; 4	7; 5
4	(Switzerland) (Poland)	Martin Froesch; Andrzej Licis	3; 6	1; 6	4; 6
5	(Switzerland) (Poland)	Erwin Balestra; Władysław Skonecki	7; 5	6; 3	4; 6	3; 6	2; 6

=== France vs. Chile ===
France
4
Stade Roland Garros, Paris, France
15–17 May 1958
Clay

Chile
1

			1	2	3	4	5
1	(France) (Chile)	Robert Haillet; Patricio Rodríguez	6; 2	6; 4	6; 3
2	(France) (Chile)	Pierre Darmon; Luis Ayala	7; 9	4; 6	7; 5	1; 6
3	(France) (Chile)	Pierre Darmon / Paul Rémy; Luis Ayala / Patricio Rodríguez	6; 2	6; 4	6; 4
4	(France) (Chile)	Robert Haillet; Luis Ayala	6; 0	6; 4	6; 4
5	(France) (Chile)	Pierre Darmon; Patricio Rodríguez	6; 2	6; 3	6; 2

=== Spain vs. Sweden ===
Spain
2
Real Club de Tenis Barcelona, Barcelona, Spain
18–20 May 1958
Clay

Sweden
3

			1	2	3	4	5
1	(Spain) (Sweden)	Andrés Gimeno; Sven Davidson	6; 3	2; 6	3; 6	6; 3	3; 6
2	(Spain) (Sweden)	Manuel Santana; Ulf Schmidt	2; 6	3; 6	5; 7
3	(Spain) (Sweden)	Alberto Arilla / Andrés Gimeno; Jan-Erik Lundqvist / Ulf Schmidt	9; 7	8; 6	9; 7
4	(Spain) (Sweden)	Andrés Gimeno; Ulf Schmidt	4; 6	6; 3	5; 7	4; 6
5	(Spain) (Sweden)	Manuel Santana; Jan-Erik Lundqvist	1; 6	6; 4	6; 0	6; 4

=== Great Britain vs. Brazil ===
Great Britain
5
Devonshire Park Lawn Tennis Club, Eastbourne, England
15–17 May 1958
Grass

Brazil
0

			1	2	3	4	5
1	(United Kingdom) (Brazil)	Billy Knight; Ronald Barnes	6; 0	6; 2	6; 0
2	(United Kingdom) (Brazil)	Mike Davies; Carlos Alberto Fernandes	6; 4	6; 2	6; 3
3	(United Kingdom) (Brazil)	Mike Davies / Bobby Wilson; Ronald Barnes / Carlos Alberto Fernandes	6; 2	6; 4	6; 4
4	(United Kingdom) (Brazil)	Mike Davies; Ivo Ribeiro	6; 2	6; 1	6; 3
5	(United Kingdom) (Brazil)	Roger Becker; Carlos Alberto Fernandes	6; 3	6; 1	6; 1

=== West Germany vs. Belgium ===
West Germany
3
Cologne, West Germany
16–18 May 1958

Belgium
2

			1	2	3	4	5
1	(West Germany) (Belgium)	Rupert Huber; André Jamar	6; 4	6; 2	6; 1
2	(West Germany) (Belgium)	Wilhelm Bungert; Jacques Brichant	4; 6	2; 6	8; 6	6; 8
3	(West Germany) (Belgium)	Rupert Huber / Peter Scholl; Jacques Brichant / Jean-Pierre Froment	6; 2	6; 1	6; 0
4	(West Germany) (Belgium)	Wilhelm Bungert; André Jamar	6; 2	6; 3	6; 1
5	(West Germany) (Belgium)	Rupert Huber; Jacques Brichant	8; 10	2; 6	6; 2	2; 6

== Quarterfinals ==
=== Denmark vs. Italy ===
Denmark
0
Copenhagen, Denmark
5–7 June 1958
Clay

Italy
5

			1	2	3	4	5
1	(Denmark) (Italy)	Kurt Nielsen; Orlando Sirola	2; 6	6; 4	5; 7	14; 12	5; 7
2	(Denmark) (Italy)	Torben Ulrich; Nicola Pietrangeli	2; 6	3; 6	1; 6
3	(Denmark) (Italy)	Kurt Nielsen / Torben Ulrich; Nicola Pietrangeli / Orlando Sirola	2; 6	6; 2	3; 6	2; 6
4	(Denmark) (Italy)	Torben Ulrich; Orlando Sirola	8; 6	3; 6	4; 6	6; 3	3; 6
5	(Denmark) (Italy)	Kurt Nielsen; Nicola Pietrangeli	1; 6	6; 3	4; 6	4; 6

=== Poland vs. Mexico ===
Poland
3
Warsaw, Poland
6–8 June 1958

Mexico
2

			1	2	3	4	5
1	(Poland) (Mexico)	Andrzej Licis; Francisco Contreras	6; 2	6; 2	8; 6
2	(Poland) (Mexico)	Władysław Skonecki; Mario Llamas	8; 6	4; 6	6; 3	7; 5
3	(Poland) (Mexico)	Józef Piątek / Jan Radzio; Rafael Osuna / Antonio Palafox	3; 6	5; 7	4; 6
4	(Poland) (Mexico)	Andrzej Licis; Mario Llamas	3; 6	5; 7	3; 6
5	(Poland) (Mexico)	Władysław Skonecki; Francisco Contreras	6; 8	6; 2	8; 6	6; 4

=== France vs. Sweden ===
France
3
Stade Roland Garros, Paris, France
6–8 June 1958
Clay

Sweden
2

			1	2	3	4	5
1	(France) (Sweden)	Pierre Darmon; Sven Davidson	3; 6	6; 3	6; 0	6; 0
2	(France) (Sweden)	Robert Haillet; Ulf Schmidt	6; 3	6; 3	6; 4
3	(France) (Sweden)	Pierre Darmon / Paul Rémy; Sven Davidson / Ulf Schmidt	3; 6	3; 6	6; 2	4; 6
4	(France) (Sweden)	Robert Haillet; Sven Davidson	4; 6	4; 6	4; 6
5	(France) (Sweden)	Pierre Darmon; Ulf Schmidt	6; 3	6; 2	6; 4

=== Great Britain vs. West Germany ===
Great Britain
5
Yorkshire Lawn Tennis Club, Scarborough, England
5–7 June 1958
Grass

West Germany
0

			1	2	3	4	5
1	(United Kingdom) (West Germany)	Roger Becker; Rupert Huber	6; 1	8; 6	6; 3
2	(United Kingdom) (West Germany)	Mike Davies; Wilhelm Bungert	6; 2	6; 2	6; 3
3	(United Kingdom) (West Germany)	Mike Davies / Bobby Wilson; Rupert Huber / Peter Scholl	6; 2	6; 4	6; 3
4	(United Kingdom) (West Germany)	Billy Knight; Rupert Huber	6; 2	6; 0	6; 4
5	(United Kingdom) (West Germany)	Roger Becker; Wilhelm Bungert	6; 2	4; 6	7; 5	6; 2

== Semifinals ==
=== Poland vs. Italy ===
Poland
1
Warsaw, Poland
18–20 July 1958

Italy
4

			1	2	3	4	5
1	(Poland) (Italy)	Władysław Skonecki; Nicola Pietrangeli	3; 6	2; 6	6; 4	1; 6
2	(Poland) (Italy)	Andrzej Licis; Orlando Sirola	4; 6	6; 3	4; 6	3; 6
3	(Poland) (Italy)	Józef Piątek / Jan Radzio; Nicola Pietrangeli / Orlando Sirola	3; 6	1; 6	1; 6
4	(Poland) (Italy)	Andrzej Licis; Nicola Pietrangeli	6; 4	6; 2	6; 1
5	(Poland) (Italy)	Władysław Skonecki; Orlando Sirola	6; 1	6; 3	0; 6	2; 6	2; 6

=== Great Britain vs. France ===
Great Britain
5
Northern Lawn Tennis Club, Manchester, England
19–21 July 1958
Grass

France
0

			1	2	3	4	5
1	(United Kingdom) (France)	Mike Davies; Paul Rémy	4; 6	4; 6	6; 3	6; 4	6; 1
2	(United Kingdom) (France)	Bobby Wilson; Pierre Darmon	6; 1	9; 7	6; 3
3	(United Kingdom) (France)	Mike Davies / Bobby Wilson; Pierre Darmon / Jean-Claude Molinari	4; 6	6; 3	6; 4	6; 1
4	(United Kingdom) (France)	Bobby Wilson; Paul Rémy	6; 3	8; 6	6; 4
5	(United Kingdom) (France)	Billy Knight; Pierre Darmon	6; 2	4; 6	6; 3	9; 7

== Final ==
=== Italy vs. Great Britain ===
Italy
4
Milan, Italy
1–3 August 1958
Clay

Great Britain
1

			1	2	3	4	5
1	(Italy) (United Kingdom)	Nicola Pietrangeli; Mike Davies	4; 6	3; 6	1; 6
2	(Italy) (United Kingdom)	Orlando Sirola; Billy Knight	6; 3	7; 5	6; 3
3	(Italy) (United Kingdom)	Nicola Pietrangeli / Orlando Sirola; Mike Davies / Billy Knight	6; 3	5; 7	6; 4	4; 6	9; 7
4	(Italy) (United Kingdom)	Nicola Pietrangeli; Billy Knight	4; 6	6; 3	6; 4	6; 1
5	(Italy) (United Kingdom)	Orlando Sirola; Mike Davies	6; 3	6; 2	6; 2
