= Myron Franks =

American tennis player (born 1936)

- Full name: Myron Jay Franks
- Country (sports): United States
- Born: December 23, 1936 (age 89) Los Angeles, United States
- Height: 5 ft 10 in (1.78 m)
- Plays: Right-handed

Grand Slam singles results
- Wimbledon: 3R (1957, 1964)
- US Open: 4R (1958)
Medal record
Maccabiah Games
Gold medal – first place	1961 Israel	Men's Doubles

Myron Jay "Mike" Franks (born December 23, 1936) is an American former world class tennis player. He was the #1 seeded junior player in 1954 in the US Nationals at Kalamazoo, Michigan. He played #1 singles for UCLA from 1956 to 1958, and was one of 8 All Americans in college tennis. UCLA won its 5th NCAA Tennis Team Championship in 1956, but was placed on two years probation for football recruiting violations in 1957 and 1958. Franks was ranked # 3 in doubles in the United States in 1956, 1957, and 1959, and was ranked # 7 in singles in 1958. He won a gold medal in doubles at the 1961 Maccabiah Games in Israel with Dick Savitt.

== Early and personal life ==
Franks was born in Beverly Hills, California, and is Jewish. Franks started playing tennis at age 12, and continued playing at Beverly Hills High School, graduating in 1954. He often practiced with Bill Tilden and Pancho Gonzales. He was considered a tennis prodigy from the time he won his first tournament match after only one month of playing, beating a player with three years experience.

For 28 years from 1974 until 2001, Franks organized and ran the Annual Carl Reiner Charity Celebrity Tennis Tournament in La Costa, California, with a total of 400 players that included 100 outstanding tennis players to play with celebrities to help slow learning children with their development. The tournament rivaled the Bob Hope and Bing Crosby Golf tournaments.

Franks married Gloria Delson Cahn, former wife of songwriter Sammy Cahn, in 1965. They continue to live in Beverly Hills, California. Before retiring, he was a senior vice president at RBC Wealth Management.

== Tennis career ==
During 1951 in his freshman year at Beverly Hills High School, he won the National Boys Doubles Championship with Albert Hernandez, Jr., and in his sophomore year he won the National Junior Hard Court Singles Tournament. In his junior year in 1953 he was ranked the # 2 junior in the US and he was a finalist in the National Junior Singles and won the National Junior Doubles with Jon Douglas, and in his senior year in 1954, he won the Southern California Junior Singles Championship, was seeded #1 in the Junior Singles at the National Tennis Championships in Kalamazoo, Michigan, and lost in the 4th round of singles due to a significant illness (mononucleosis) as well as in the finals of Doubles with partner, Jon Douglas. He was also a member of the Junior Davis Cup team.

Franks attended the University of California-Los Angeles (UCLA), where he was coached by J.D. Morgan and played #1 singles for three years on a team consisting of Mike Green, Franklin Johnson (former USTA President), John Cranston, John Lesch, and Joe Blatchford (former Director of the Peace Corps). In 1956, he was the #2 ranked college player in America behind Alex Olmedo. He was a finalist to Olmedo in the Pac-8 Singles Championships, and he was again a finalist to him in the NCAA Singles Semifinals, and to Olmedo and Contreras in the Doubles Finals. He won the Southern California Intercollegiate Singles Championship, was a semifinalist in the US National Doubles, and won the Pacific Southwest Doubles. UCLA won its 5th NCAA Team Championship in 1956, but was placed on NCAA probation in 1957 and 1958, due to football recruiting violations. Franks only singles losses in college were to Alex Olmedo. He did beat Olmedo 4 times over his tennis career, starting in 1954, then 1956, 1958, and 1959. He was one of 8 College All-Americans in 1957 and 1958. He was on the US Davis Cup Team in 1956.

After UCLA, Franks served in the US Navy and lived with famous clothing designer and tennis player Oleg Cassini, as part of his Navy Officer military commitment in New York City.

In 1958, Franks was ranked #7 in the country. in 1959, he won the Pacific Southwest Doubles Title with Barry MacKay, and the Southern California Men's Singles Championships by defeating Alex Olmedo in the Finals, one month before Olmedo won the Wimbledon Championships. In 1961, Franks and Donald Dell were selected by the US State Department to be the first Americans to play tennis in the Russian National Championships.

That same year, he won a gold medal by winning the doubles at the 1961 Maccabiah Games in Israel with Dick Savitt, defeating South Africans Rod Mandelstam and Julie Mayers, and they remain longtime friends; Franks won the silver medal in singles in the competition, losing to Savitt in the finals. He again won the Doubles Gold Medal at the 1965 Maccabiah Games with Ronny Goldman.

In 1957, he and Mike Green reached the Quarterfinals of the 1957 Wimbledon Men's Doubles. He competed at Wimbledon in 1957, 1959, and 1964.

In his tennis career he defeated the following tennis champions: Rod Laver, Alex Olmedo, Arthur Ashe, Gil Shea, Ulf Schmidt, Jon Douglas, Barry MacKay, Herb Flam, Mike Green, Warren Woodcock, Donald Dell, Allen Fox, Charlie Pasarell, Tom Brown, Dennis Ralston, Ron Holmberg, John Newcombe, Bob Hewitt, Fred Stolle, Vic Seixas, Rafael Osuna, Mal Anderson, Billy Knight, Billy Talbert, Billy Lenoir, and Sammy Giammalva. He never beat Lew Hoad, Ken Rosewall, or Roy Emerson.

Franks recommended very good friend and top Professional Pancho Segura, who he met as a ball boy at age 15, to be the Head Professional at the Beverly Hills Tennis Club, and he was hired. Franks was a featured speaker at Segura's Memorial Service at the BHTC on December 17, 2017.

=== Halls of Fame ===
In 1990, he was inducted into the Southern California Jewish Sports Hall of Fame. He was inducted into the Beverly Hills High School Hall of Fame in 2013. He was named for induction into the Intercollegiate Tennis Association (ITA) Men's Collegiate Hall of Fame on June 6, 2022. On October 19, 2017, he was nominated for the Southern California Tennis Association Hall of Fame, and on August 7, 2018 he was nominated for the UCLA Athletics Hall of Fame.

== See also ==
- List of select Jewish tennis players
