= 1958 U.S. National Championships (tennis) =

- Date: 29 August – 7 September
- Edition: 78th
- Category: Grand Slam (ILTF)
- Surface: Grass
- Location: Forest Hills, Queens; New York City, New York
- Venue: West Side Tennis Club

Champions

Men's singles
- (Australia) Ashley Cooper

Women's singles
- (United States) Althea Gibson

Men's doubles
- (United States) Alex Olmedo / (United States) Ham Richardson

Women's doubles
- (United States) Jeanne Arth / (United States) Darlene Hard

Mixed doubles
- (United States) Margaret Osborne / (Australia) Neale Fraser
- U.S. National Championships

The 1958 U.S. National Championships (now known as the US Open) was a tennis tournament that took place on the outdoor grass courts at the West Side Tennis Club, Forest Hills in New York City, New York. The tournament ran from 29 August until 7 September. It was the 78th staging of the U.S. National Championships, and the fourth Grand Slam tennis event of the year.

== Finals ==
=== Men's singles ===
(Australia) Ashley Cooper defeated (Australia) Malcolm Anderson 6–2, 3–6, 4–6, 10–8, 8–6

=== Women's singles ===
(United States) Althea Gibson defeated (United States) Darlene Hard 3–6, 6–1, 6–2

=== Men's doubles ===
(United States) Alex Olmedo (USA) / (United States) Ham Richardson (USA) defeated (United States) Sam Giammalva (USA) / (United States) Barry MacKay (tennis) (USA) 3–6, 6–3, 6–4, 6–4

=== Women's doubles ===
(United States) Jeanne Arth (USA) / (United States) Darlene Hard (USA) defeated (United States) Althea Gibson (USA) / (Brazil) Maria Bueno (BRA) 2–6, 6–3, 6–4

=== Mixed doubles ===
(United States) Margaret Osborne (USA) / (Australia) Neale Fraser (AUS) defeated (Brazil) Maria Bueno (BRA) / (United States) Alex Olmedo (USA) 6–4, 3–6, 9–7

Preceded by 1958 Wimbledon Championships	Grand Slams	Succeeded by 1959 Australian Championships
