= 1958 Davis Cup Eastern Zone =

International tennis competition

The Eastern Zone was one of the three regional zones of the 1958 Davis Cup.

5 teams entered the Eastern Zone, with the winner going on to compete in the Inter-Zonal Zone against the winners of the America Zone and Europe Zone. The Philippines defeated Ceylon in the final and progressed to the Inter-Zonal Zone.

== Draw ==
Quarterfinals; 28–30 March
Tokyo, Japan
Japan	5
Thailand	0
Philippines
bye
bye
Ceylon
bye
Malaya

Semifinals; 23 April–4 May
Tokyo, Japan
Japan	2
Philippines	3
Singapore (grass)
Ceylon	3
Malaya	1

Final; 21–23 May
Manila, Philippines
Philippines	5
Ceylon	0

== Quarterfinals ==
=== Japan vs. Thailand ===
Japan
5
Tokyo, Japan
28–30 March 1958

Thailand
0

			1	2	3	4	5
1	(Japan) (Thailand)	Osamu Ishiguro; Anek Duangudom	6; 1	6; 0	6; 3
2	(Japan) (Thailand)	Kosei Kamo; Sutiraphan Karalak	6; 4	6; 1	6; 0
3	(Japan) (Thailand)	Kosei Kamo / Yoshihisa Shibata; Sutiraphan Karalak / Kravi Sudasna	4; 6	6; 1	6; 4	9; 7
4	(Japan) (Thailand)	Yoshihisa Shibata; Anek Duangudom	6; 3	6; 2	6; 4
5	(Japan) (Thailand)	Osamu Ishiguro; Sutiraphan Karalak	6; 3	6; 2	6; 3

== Semifinals ==
=== Japan vs. Philippines ===
Japan
2
Tokyo, Japan
2–4 May 1958

Philippines
3

			1	2	3	4	5
1	(Japan) (Philippines)	Kosei Kamo; Raymundo Deyro	2; 6	3; 6	3; 6
2	(Japan) (Philippines)	Osamu Ishiguro; Felicisimo Ampon	4; 6	3; 6	8; 10
3	(Japan) (Philippines)	Kosei Kamo / Yoshihisa Shibata; Felicisimo Ampon / Raymundo Deyro	4; 6	3; 6	6; 3	6; 8
4	(Japan) (Philippines)	Kosei Kamo; Juan-Johnson Jose	6; 3	6; 0	6; 2
5	(Japan) (Philippines)	Osamu Ishiguro; Miguel Dungo	6; 2	1; 6	6; 4	6; 1

=== Malaya vs. Ceylon ===
Malaya
1
Singapore
23–25 April 1958
Grass

Ceylon
3

			1	2	3	4	5
1	(Federation of Malaya) (Dominion of Ceylon)	Hee-Chin Lim; Rupert Ferdinands	7; 9	0; 6	1; 6
2	(Federation of Malaya) (Dominion of Ceylon)	Chew-Bee Ong; Bernard Pinto	9; 7	6; 3	6; 4
3	(Federation of Malaya) (Dominion of Ceylon)	Kit-Soon Khong / Moses Tay; Rupert Ferdinands / Bernard Pinto	2; 6	4; 6	1; 6
4	(Federation of Malaya) (Dominion of Ceylon)	Chew-Bee Ong; Rupert Ferdinands	4; 6	3; 6	8; 10
5	(Federation of Malaya) (Dominion of Ceylon)	Hee-Chin Lim; Raja Praesody	6; 4	6; 4	5; 7			not completed

== Final ==
=== Philippines vs. Ceylon ===
Philippines
5
Manila, Philippines
21–23 May 1958

Ceylon
0

			1	2	3	4	5
1	(Philippines) (Dominion of Ceylon)	Felicisimo Ampon; Bernard Pinto	6; 1	6; 0	6; 1
2	(Philippines) (Dominion of Ceylon)	Raymundo Deyro; Rupert Ferdinands	6; 2	6; 2	6; 1
3	(Philippines) (Dominion of Ceylon)	Miguel Dungo / Juan-Johnson Jose; Rupert Ferdinands / Bernard Pinto	6; 1	6; 0	6; 4
4	(Philippines) (Dominion of Ceylon)	Miguel Dungo; Raja Praesody	6; 2	6; 3	7; 5
5	(Philippines) (Dominion of Ceylon)	Juan-Johnson Jose; Rupert Ferdinands	6; 1	6; 4	6; 3
