= Ulf Schmidt =

Swedish tennis player

- Full name: Ulf Christian Johan Schmidt
- Country (sports): Sweden
- Born: 12 July 1934 (age 92) Nacka, Sweden
- Turned pro: 1951 (amateur tour)
- Retired: 1962

Singles
- Career titles: 14
- Highest ranking: No. 8 (1958, Lance Tingay)

Grand Slam singles results
- Australian Open: QF (1959)
- French Open: 3R (1956, 1958)
- Wimbledon: QF (1956, 1957)
- US Open: SF (1958)

Grand Slam doubles results
- Australian Open: QF (1959)
- Wimbledon: W (1958)

Ulf "Uffe" Christian Johan Schmidt (born 12 July 1934) is a former Swedish tennis player. He competed for AIK from Stockholm.

Schmidt won 14 singles' tournaments, among them the International Swedish Championships in Båstad in 1957 and 1961. In 1958 he and Sven Davidson won the doubles event in Wimbledon after defeating the top seeds Ashley Cooper and Neale Fraser in the final. They were the only Swedish winners before the Borg era.

Schmidt's best singles result at a Grand Slam tournament was reaching the semifinal at the 1958 U.S. National Championships. Schmidt was unseeded and defeated third-seeded Ham Richardson in the fourth round before losing to first-seeded Mal Anderson in the semifinal. At the Wimbledon Championships he reached the quarterfinals in 1956 and 1957.

Schmidt was ranked World No. 8 for 1958 by Lance Tingay of The Daily Telegraph (and No. 10 in 1961).

Schmidt played 102 Davis Cup matches for Sweden (1955–1964) and won 66 of them.

== Grand Slam finals ==
=== Doubles (1 title) ===
Result	Year	Championship	Surface	Partner	Opponents	Score
Win	1958	Wimbledon	Grass	(Sweden) Sven Davidson	(Australia) Ashley Cooper (Australia) Neale Fraser	6–4, 6–4, 8–6
