= Midge Richardson =

Agnes Theresa "Midge" Turk Richardson (March 26, 1930 – c. December 17, 2012) was an American religious sister and educator turned author and magazine editor. She edited Seventeen from 1975 until her retirement in 1993.

== Life and career ==
Richardson was born in Los Angeles, California. She attended Bishop Conaty-Our Lady of Loretto High School. From age 18 to 36, she took the name Sister Agnes Marie and lived in a Roman Catholic convent Sisters of the Immaculate Heart of Mary. She earned a bachelor's degree and a master's degree at the order's Immaculate Heart College. She then taught English, French and drama in local parochial schools, and then became the superintendent of Our Lady Queen of Angels High School in Los Angeles for seven years. Richardson left her religious order in 1966 after suffering from temporary blindness twice.

In 1971, she published her memoir The Buried Life. She also wrote a children's biography of her friend, photographer Gordon Parks.

She was married to tennis player Ham Richardson from 1974 until his death in 2006.

== Publications ==
- Turk, Midge (1971). The Buried Life: A Nun's Journey. World Publishing Company, ASIN B0006CUILI
- Turk, Midge (1971). Gordon Parks. Crowell, ASIN B00A5AAEIS
