= Heikki Hedman =

Finnish tennis player (1940–2022)

Heikke Hedman
- Country (sports): Finland
- Born: 25 April 1940
- Died: 3 April 2022 (aged 81)
- Turned pro: 1957 (amateur tour)

Heikki Hedman (25 April 1940 – 3 April 2022) was a Finnish tennis player.

== Tennis career ==
Hedman represented Finland in the Davis Cup competition during the period 1958 to 1969. He made his debut for the Finland team during the 1958 Europe Zone second round tie against Mexico, losing both his singles matches. His next appearance was six years later in the 1964 Europe Zone first round tie against Denmark. Hedman played six Davis Cup singles and three doubles rubbers, with only one victory in a doubles match.

In 1969 Hedman founded TennisHedman, a tennis school in Helsinki.

== See also ==
- List of Finland Davis Cup team representatives
