= 1959 Australian Championships – Men's singles =

Men's singles
- 1959 Australian Championships

Final
- Champion: (United States) Alex Olmedo
- Runner-up: (Australia) Neale Fraser
- Score: 6–1, 6–2, 3–6, 6–3

Details
- Draw: 37
- Seeds: 16

Events
Singles	men	women
Doubles	men	women
- Australian Championships

Second-seeded Alex Olmedo defeated Neale Fraser 6–1, 6–2, 3–6, 6–3 in the final to win the men's singles tennis title at the 1959 Australian Championships.

== Seeds ==
The seeded players are listed below. Alex Olmedo is the champion; others show the round in which they were eliminated.

1. (Australia) Neale Fraser (finalist)
2. (United States) Alex Olmedo (champion)
3. (Australia) Roy Emerson (quarterfinals)
4. (Spain) Andrés Gimeno (quarterfinals)
5. (Australia) Rod Laver (third round)
6. (United States) Barry MacKay (semifinals)
7. (Australia) Bob Mark (semifinals)
8. (United States) Butch Buchholz (second round)
9. (Australia) Bob Howe (second round)
10. (Sweden) Ulf Schmidt (quarterfinals)
11. (Australia) Don Candy (quarterfinals)
12. (Sweden) Jan-Erik Lundqvist (third round)
13. (Australia) Warren Woodcock (third round)
14. (South Africa) Trevor Fancutt (second round)
15. (Australia) Martin Mulligan (third round)
16. (United States) Christopher Crawford (third round)

== Draw ==
=== Key ===
- Q = Qualifier
- WC = Wild card
- LL = Lucky loser
- r = Retired

=== Finals ===
Quarterfinals
1	(Australia) Neale Fraser	6	6	4	6
11	(Australia) Don Candy	2	4	6	4
7	(Australia) Bob Mark	6	3	7	6
4	(Spain) Andrés Gimeno	4	6	5	4
3	(Australia) Roy Emerson	6	8	3	6
6	(United States) Barry MacKay	4	10	6	8
10	(Sweden) Ulf Schmidt	4	7	6	6	5
2	(United States) Alex Olmedo	6	9	3	3	7

Semifinals
1	(Australia) Neale Fraser	6	6	6
7	(Australia) Bob Mark	4	4	3
6	(United States) Barry MacKay	6	6	1	6	3
2	(United States) Alex Olmedo	3	8	6	3	6

Final
1	(Australia) Neale Fraser	1	2	6	3
2	(United States) Alex Olmedo	6	6	3	6

=== Earlier rounds ===
==== Section 1 ====
First round
(Australia) O'Brien	6	7	4	6
(Australia) Gabb	2	5	6	1

Second round
1	(Australia) Fraser	6	6	6
(Australia) O'Brien	4	2	2
(Australia) Phillips-Moore	7	3	1	3
16	(United States) Crawford	5	6	6	6
11	(Australia) Candy	6	6	6
(Australia) Gorman	3	4	0
(Australia) Gibson	8	6	1	6
8	(United States) Buchholz	6	4	6	1

Third round
1	(Australia) Fraser	4	6	6	7	6
16	(United States) Crawford	6	0	3	9	2
11	(Australia) Candy	6	6	10
(Australia) Gibson	2	2	8

Quarterfinals
1	(Australia) Fraser	6	6	4	6
11	(Australia) Candy	2	4	6	4

==== Section 2 ====
First round
(Australia) Moore	3	6	6	6
(Australia) Nette	6	3	4	1

Second round
7	(Australia) Mark	6	6	6
(Australia) Moore	2	2	1
(Australia) Lane	3	3	3
12	(Sweden) Lundqvist	6	6	6
13	(Australia) Woodcock	7	7	0	6
(Australia) Kerr	5	5	6	2
(Australia) Hewitt	1	4	4
4	(Spain) Gimeno	6	6	6

Third round
7	(Australia) Mark	9	6	6
12	(Sweden) Lundqvist	7	4	0
13	(Australia) Woodcock	3	4	3
4	(Spain) Gimeno	6	6	6

Quarterfinals
7	(Australia) Mark	6	3	7	6
4	(Spain) Gimeno	4	6	5	4

==== Section 3 ====
First round
(Australia) Pearson	3	6	6	6
(Australia) Dicker	6	3	2	1

Second round
3	(Australia) Emerson	10	6	4	6
(Australia) Pearson	8	2	6	1
(Australia) Bowman	6	6	13
14	(South Africa) Fancutt	4	2	11
15	(Australia) Mulligan	6	6	7
(Australia) Pfitzner	2	2	5
(Australia) Fletcher	6	3	6	2	4
6	(United States) MacKay	4	6	1	6	6

Third round
3	(Australia) Emerson	6	8	13
(Australia) Bowman	4	6	11
15	(Australia) Mulligan	7	1	6	1	5
6	(United States) MacKay	5	6	1	6	7

Quarterfinals
3	(Australia) Emerson	6	8	3	6
6	(United States) MacKay	4	10	6	8

==== Section 4 ====
First round
(Philippines) Hernandez	9	6	6
(Australia) McEgan	7	1	4
(Australia) Pearce	7	6	6
(Australia) Hillebrand	5	4	3

Second round
5	(Australia) Laver	6	6	6
(Philippines) Hernandez	2	3	1
(Australia) Pares	2	2	1
10	(Sweden) Schmidt	6	6	6
9	(Australia) Howe	6	0	3
(Australia) Pearce	8	6	6
(Australia) Reid	3	3	1
2	(United States) Olmedo	6	6	6

Third round
5	(Australia) Laver	2	3	6	4
10	(Sweden) Schmidt	6	6	3	6
(Australia) Pearce	7	3	6	2	3
2	(United States) Olmedo	5	6	3	6	6

Quarterfinals
10	(Sweden) Schmidt	4	7	6	6	5
2	(United States) Olmedo	6	9	3	3	7

Preceded by 1958 U.S. National Championships	Grand Slam men's singles	Succeeded by 1959 French Championships
