= Tournament director =

A tournament director (TD) is an official at a competitive sporting or gaming event, who typically perform a number of key functions. The extent of the tournament director's duties varies depending on the size of the tournament, the nature of the competition, and the number of other officials to whom roles can be delegated.

Examples often include:

- Declaring that competition may begin
- Refereeing game play
- Organizing elimination tournament brackets, or pairings of a Swiss system tournament
- Tracking scores and statistics
- Enforcing rules and regulations
- Arbitrating disputes
- Officiating awards ceremonies

Tournament directors often refer to individual sports like tennis and golf, where each competition is organized separately.

In fencing, the tournament director is known by the French name, directoire technique (commonly abbreviated to DT).

== See also ==
- Tournament director (bridge)
- Tournament director (chess)
- Tournament director (poker)
- Race director
