= Sam Giammalva =

American tennis player

- Full name: Sam Giammalva Sr.
- Country (sports): United States
- Born: August 1, 1934 (age 90); Houston, Texas
- Height: 5 ft 11 in (1.80 m)

Singles
- Career record: 12–9

Grand Slam singles results
- Wimbledon: 2R (1956)
- US Open: QF (1955)

Other tournaments
- Professional majors
- US Pro: QF (1960)
- Other pro events
- TOC: 1R (1959^{FH})

Doubles
- Career record: 2–7

Grand Slam doubles results
- Wimbledon: 3R (1956)
- US Open: F (1958)

Mixed doubles

Grand Slam mixed doubles results
- Wimbledon: 4R (1956)

Team competitions
- Davis Cup: W (1958)

Sam Giammalva Sr. (born August 1, 1934), is an American former professional tennis player in the mid-20th century.

Giammalva played for the United States Davis Cup team, earning a 7–3 record in match play between 1956 and 1958. He was on the victorious U.S. teams of 1957 and 1958. In 1958, he teamed up with Barry MacKay to reach the doubles final at the U.S. Nationals. The pair fell to Alex Olmedo and Ham Richardson, 3–6, 6–3, 6–4, 6–4. It was Michigan’s MacKay who beat Giammalva, of the University of Texas at Austin, in the final of the 1957 NCAA Championship in five sets. Giammalva also reached the NCAA doubles final in 1955. He won three straight Southwest Conference singles titles from 1956-1958.

Giammalva won the Eastern Grasscourt Championships in 1955, defeating Seixas, Nielsen, and Shea to win the title. Giammalva also reached four finals at the Cincinnati Masters: two singles finals and two doubles finals. In 1958, he knocked out Crawford Henry, Gustavo Palafox, and Donald Dell before falling to fellow Texan Bernard Bartzen in the singles final by a score of 7–5, 6–3, 6–2. He also reached the singles final in 1954 and doubles finals in 1952 and 1958.

Giammalva's best grand slam singles result was reaching the quarter-finals of the 1955 U.S. National Championships, where he lost to No. 4 seed Lew Hoad in four sets. Sam Giammalva started as tennis professional in 1959 on The Jack Kramer Championships, playing in the Forest Hills Professional Tournament of Champions that year. He won the 1959 Southern U.S. Pro Grasscourt title beating Budge and Riggs. He played the US Pro Championships in 1960, 1964, 1965, 1966 and 1967.

Giammalva went on to coach at Rice University for 14 years from 1959 to 1972, leading the Owls to 10 Southwest Conference titles and second-place NCAA tournament finishes in 1968 and 1970.

Giammalva’s sons, Tony Giammalva and Sammy Giammalva Jr., were also tennis players. Sam Jr. won two singles titles and four doubles titles on the ATP Tour, and was ranked as high as world no. 28 in singles and no. 22 in doubles during his career. Elder son Tony won 4 doubles titles and reached a career high singles ranking of 70 in 1981.

== Grand Slam finals ==
=== Doubles: 1 runner-up ===
Result	Year	Championship	Surface	Partner	Opponents	Score
Loss	1958	U.S. Championships	Grass	(United States) Barry MacKay	(United States) Alex Olmedo (United States) Ham Richardson	6–3, 3–6, 4–6, 4–6
