= 1958 Davis Cup =

1958 edition of the Davis Cup

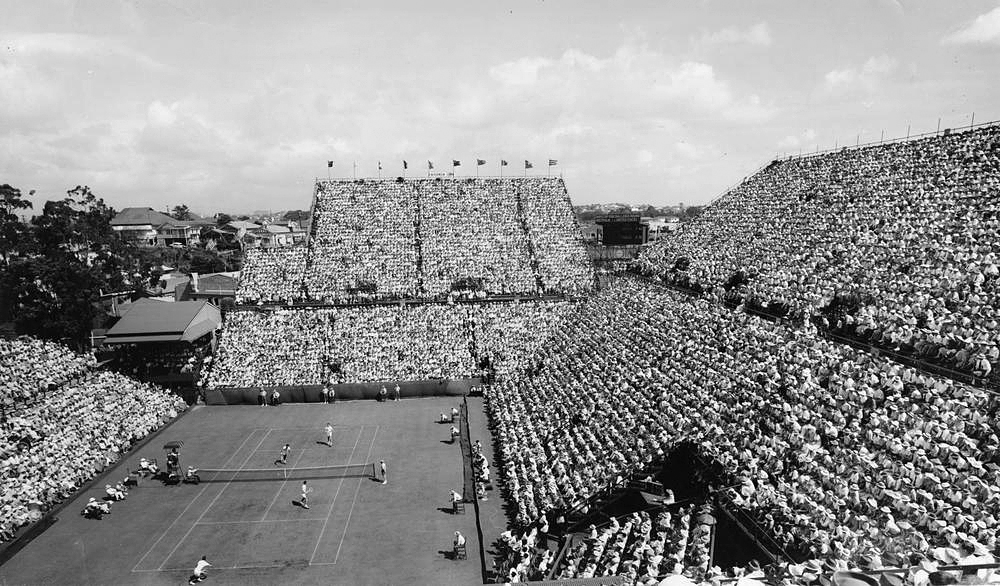
- 1958 Davis Cup tennis Challenge Round between Australia and the United States played on the Milton Courts in Brisbane, Australia

Details
- Duration: 28 March – 31 December 1958
- Edition: 47th
- Teams: 37

Champion
- Winning nation: United States

The 1958 Davis Cup was the 47th edition of the Davis Cup, the most important tournament between national teams in men's tennis. 24 teams entered the Europe Zone, 7 teams entered the America Zone, and 5 teams entered the Eastern Zone. Thailand made its first appearance in the competition.

The United States defeated Argentina in the America Zone final, the Philippines defeated Ceylon in the Eastern Zone final, and Italy defeated Great Britain in the Europe Zone final. In the Inter-Zonal Zone, Italy defeated the Philippines in the semifinal, and then the United States defeated Italy in the final. The United States then defeated the defending champions Australia in the Challenge Round. The final was played at the Milton Courts in Brisbane, Australia on 29–31 December.

The US team was composed of Alex Olmedo, Ham Richardson, Barry MacKay (tennis), and captain Perry T. Jones. Jack Kramer and Pancho Gonzales acted as advisors to Jones.

== America Zone ==
=== Draw ===
Quarterfinals; 16–18 May; 4–12 July
Israel
bye
Buenos Aires, Argentina (clay)
Argentina	5
Caribbean/West Indies	0
Toronto, Canada (clay)
Canada	5
Cuba	0
Caracas, Venezuela
Venezuela	0
United States	5

Semifinals; 11–21 July
Buenos Aires, Argentina (clay)
Israel	0
Argentina	5
Toronto, Canada (clay)
Canada	0
United States	5

Final; 15–18 August
Rye, NY, United States (grass)
Argentina	0
United States	5

=== Final ===
United States vs. Argentina

United States
5
Westchester Country Club, Rye, NY, United States
15–18 August 1958
Grass

Argentina
0

			1	2	3	4	5
1	(United States) (Argentina)	Barry MacKay; Eduardo Soriano	6; 2	6; 2	3; 6	6; 3
2	(United States) (Argentina)	Ham Richardson; Enrique Morea	6; 1	6; 2	7; 9	6; 2
3	(United States) (Argentina)	Sam Giammalva / Barry MacKay; Enrique Morea / Eduardo Soriano	6; 3	6; 2	6; 2
4	(United States) (Argentina)	Ham Richardson; Eduardo Soriano	6; 4	6; 2	7; 5
5	(United States) (Argentina)	Barry MacKay; Enrique Morea	6; 2	6; 2	6; 2

== Eastern Zone ==
=== Draw ===
Quarterfinals; 28–30 March
Tokyo, Japan
Japan	5
Thailand	0
Philippines
bye
bye
Ceylon
bye
Malaya

Semifinals; 23 April–4 May
Tokyo, Japan
Japan	2
Philippines	3
Singapore (grass)
Ceylon	3
Malaya	1

Final; 21–23 May
Manila, Philippines
Philippines	5
Ceylon	0

=== Final ===
Philippines vs. Ceylon

Philippines
5
Manila, Philippines
21–23 May 1958

Ceylon
0

			1	2	3	4	5
1	(Philippines) (Dominion of Ceylon)	Felicisimo Ampon; Bernard Pinto	6; 1	6; 0	6; 1
2	(Philippines) (Dominion of Ceylon)	Raymundo Deyro; Rupert Ferdinands	6; 2	6; 2	6; 1
3	(Philippines) (Dominion of Ceylon)	Miguel Dungo / Juan-Johnson Jose; Rupert Ferdinands / Bernard Pinto	6; 1	6; 0	6; 4
4	(Philippines) (Dominion of Ceylon)	Miguel Dungo; Raja Praesody	6; 2	6; 3	7; 5
5	(Philippines) (Dominion of Ceylon)	Juan-Johnson Jose; Rupert Ferdinands	6; 1	6; 4	6; 3

== Europe Zone ==
=== Draw ===
First Round; 25 April–4 May
Italy
bye
Monaco	0
India	5
Denmark
bye
Yugoslavia	0
Czechoslovakia	5
Mexico
bye
Luxembourg	0
Finland	5
Poland
bye
Switzerland	3
Austria	2
Turkey	1
Chile	4
bye
France
Egypt	1
Spain	4
bye
Sweden
Hungary	2
Brazil	3
bye
Great Britain
West Germany	4
Netherlands	0
bye
Belgium

Second Round; 15–20 May
Florence, Italy (clay)
Italy	3
India	2
Copenhagen, Denmark (clay)
Denmark	3
Czechoslovakia	2
Helsinki, Finland
Mexico	5
Finland	0
Lausanne, Switzerland
Poland	4
Switzerland	1
Paris, France (clay)
Chile	1
France	4
Barcelona, Spain (clay)
Spain	2
Sweden	3
Eastbourne, England (grass)
Brazil	0
Great Britain	5
Cologne, West Germany
West Germany	3
Belgium	2

Quarterfinals; 5–8 June
Copenhagen, Denmark (clay)
Italy	5
Denmark	0
Warsaw, Poland
Mexico	2
Poland	3
Paris, France (clay)
France	3
Sweden	2
Scarborough, England (grass)
Great Britain	5
West Germany	0

Semifinals; 18–21 July
Warsaw, Poland
Italy	4
Poland	1
Manchester, England (grass)
France	0
Great Britain	5

Final; 1–3 August
Milan, Italy (clay)
Italy	4
Great Britain	1

=== Final ===
Italy vs. Great Britain

Italy
4
Milan, Italy
1–3 August 1958
Clay

Great Britain
1

			1	2	3	4	5
1	(Italy) (United Kingdom)	Nicola Pietrangeli; Mike Davies	4; 6	3; 6	1; 6
2	(Italy) (United Kingdom)	Orlando Sirola; Billy Knight	6; 3	7; 5	6; 3
3	(Italy) (United Kingdom)	Nicola Pietrangeli / Orlando Sirola; Mike Davies / Billy Knight	6; 3	5; 7	6; 4	4; 6	9; 7
4	(Italy) (United Kingdom)	Nicola Pietrangeli; Billy Knight	4; 6	6; 3	6; 4	6; 1
5	(Italy) (United Kingdom)	Orlando Sirola; Mike Davies	6; 3	6; 2	6; 2

== Inter-Zonal Zone ==
=== Draw ===
Semifinals; 6–8 December
AME	United States
bye
Sydney, Australia (grass)
EAS	Philippines	0
EUR	Italy	5

Final; 19–21 December
Perth, Australia (grass)
AME	United States	5
EUR	Italy	0

=== Semifinals ===
Philippines vs. Italy

Philippines
0
Sydney, Australia
6–8 December 1958
Grass

Italy
5

			1	2	3	4	5
1	(Philippines) (Italy)	Raymundo Deyro; Orlando Sirola	6; 8	3; 6	4; 6
2	(Philippines) (Italy)	Felicisimo Ampon; Nicola Pietrangeli	2; 6	2; 6	5; 7
3	(Philippines) (Italy)	Miguel Dungo / Juan-Johnson José; Nicola Pietrangeli / Orlando Sirola	3; 6	3; 6	5; 7
4	(Philippines) (Italy)	Miguel Dungo; Nicola Pietrangeli	2; 6	2; 6	2; 6
5	(Philippines) (Italy)	Juan-Johnson Jose; Giuseppe Merlo	2; 6	5; 7	1; 6

=== Final ===
United States vs. Italy

United States
5
Royal King's Park Tennis Club, Perth, Australia
19–21 December 1958
Grass

Italy
0

			1	2	3	4	5
1	(United States) (Italy)	Alex Olmedo; Nicola Pietrangeli	5; 7	10; 8	6; 0	6; 1
2	(United States) (Italy)	Ham Richardson; Orlando Sirola	6; 4	6; 2	7; 5
3	(United States) (Italy)	Alex Olmedo / Ham Richardson; Nicola Pietrangeli / Orlando Sirola	7; 9	6; 4	13; 11	7; 5
4	(United States) (Italy)	Barry MacKay; Nicola Pietrangeli	6; 4	3; 6	5; 7	8; 6	8; 6
5	(United States) (Italy)	Alex Olmedo; Orlando Sirola	20; 18	6; 1	6; 4

== Challenge Round ==
Australia vs. United States

Australia
2
Milton Courts, Brisbane, Australia
29–31 December 1958
Grass

United States
3

			1	2	3	4	5
1	(Australia) (United States)	Mal Anderson; Alex Olmedo	6; 8	6; 2	7; 9	6; 8
2	(Australia) (United States)	Ashley Cooper; Barry MacKay	4; 6	6; 3	6; 2	6; 4
3	(Australia) (United States)	Mal Anderson / Neale Fraser; Alex Olmedo / Ham Richardson	12; 10	6; 3	14; 16	3; 6	5; 7
4	(Australia) (United States)	Ashley Cooper; Alex Olmedo	3; 6	6; 4	4; 6	6; 8
5	(Australia) (United States)	Mal Anderson; Barry MacKay	7; 5	13; 11	11; 9
