= Alex Olmedo =

Peruvian tennis player (1936–2020)

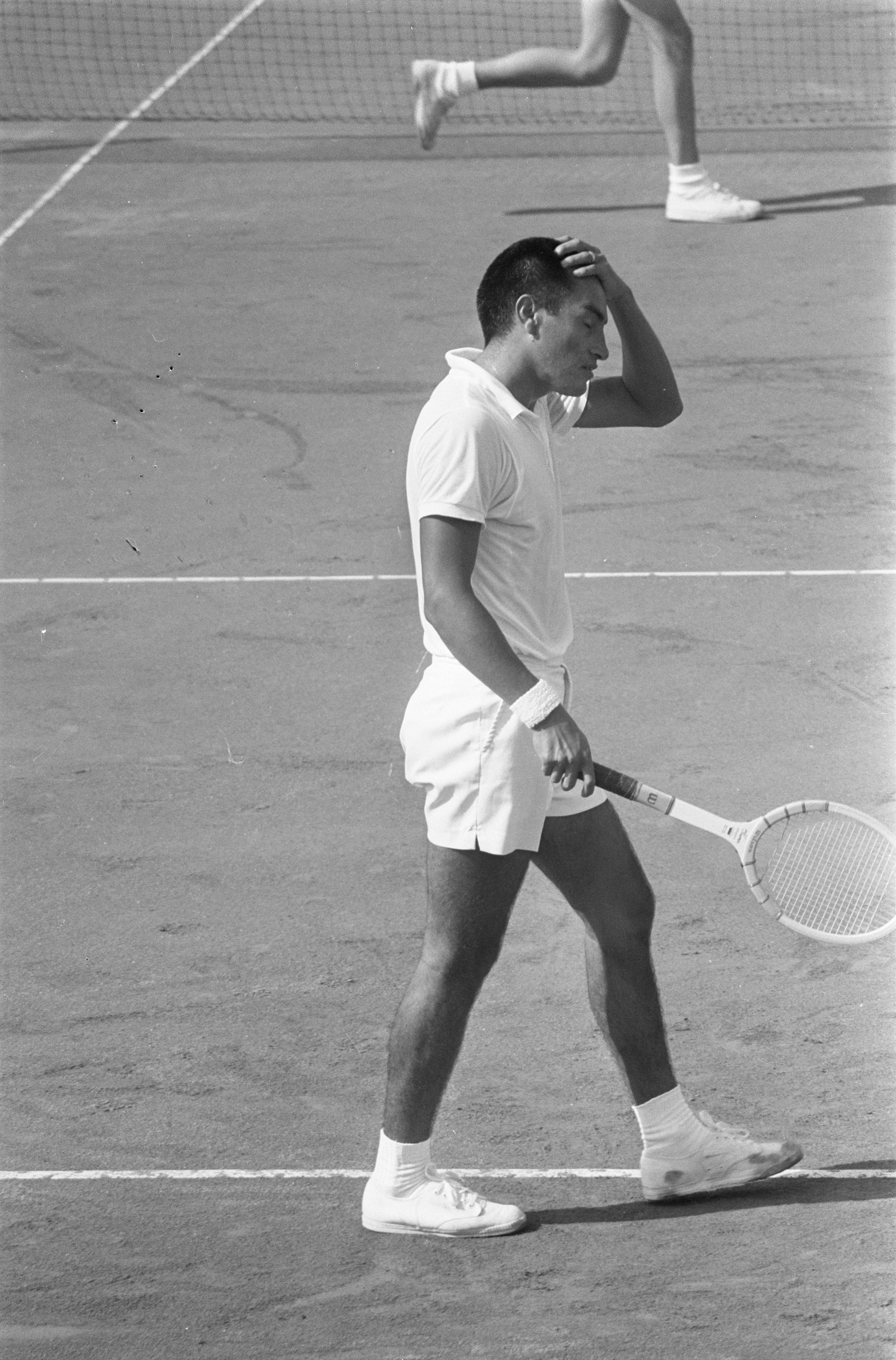
- Olmedo in Noordwijk (the Netherlands), 1964
- Full name: Alejandro Olmedo Rodríguez
- Country (sports): Peru; United States
- Born: March 24, 1936 Arequipa, Peru
- Died: December 9, 2020 (aged 84) Los Angeles, California, US
- Height: 5 ft 10 in (1.78 m)
- Turned pro: 1960
- Retired: 1977
- Plays: Right-handed (one-handed backhand)
- Int. Tennis HoF: 1987 (member page)

Singles
- Career record: 477–420 (53.1%)
- Career titles: 21
- Highest ranking: No. 2 (1959, Lance Tingay)

Grand Slam singles results
- Australian Open: W (1959)
- French Open: 1R (1969, 1972)
- Wimbledon: W (1959)
- US Open: F (1959)

Other tournaments
- Professional majors
- US Pro: W (1960)
- Wembley Pro: SF (1960, 1963)
- French Pro: QF (1962, 1964)

Doubles
- Career record: 26–35

Grand Slam doubles results
- US Open: W (1958)

Grand Slam mixed doubles results
- US Open: F (1958)

Team competitions
- Davis Cup: W (1958)

Alejandro "Alex" Olmedo Rodríguez (March 24, 1936 – December 9, 2020) was a tennis player from Peru with American citizenship. He was listed by the USTA as a "foreign" player for 1958, but as a U.S. player for 1959. He helped win the Davis Cup for the United States in 1958 and was the No. 2 ranked amateur in 1959. Olmedo won two Majors in 1959 (Australia and Wimbledon) and the U.S. Pro Championships in 1960, and was inducted into the Tennis Hall of Fame in 1987.

== Biography ==
Although born and raised in Peru, Olmedo moved to Southern California and was mentored by Perry T. Jones, president of the Southern California Tennis Association at the Los Angeles Tennis Club (LATC). George Toley recruited him to play for the University of Southern California (USC). Olmedo graduated with a business degree from USC. While there, he won the National Collegiate Athletic Association (NCAA) Singles and Doubles Championships in 1956 and 1958. (In 1957, USC was excluded from NCAA competition due to a financial contribution violation involving the football program which also suspended the tennis team.)

Olmedo was ranked as the world No. 2 in 1959 by Lance Tingay of The Daily Telegraph.

Perry T. Jones was Davis Cup captain in 1958 and recruited Olmedo from Modesto Junior College to play on the team. He represented the U.S. in Davis Cup competition in 1958 and 1959, winning in both singles and doubles – achieving all three of the three points required to win the Cup in 1958 (two singles and one doubles). His teammates were Ham Richardson and Barry MacKay, when they won the Cup in 1958. Although he was not a U.S. citizen, he was technically eligible to represent the U.S. in Davis Cup because he had lived in the country for at least three years (since February 1954) and because Peru, his country of citizenship, did not have a Davis Cup team in those particular years. However, his participation was very controversial. Sports columnist Arthur Dailey at The New York Times wrote "This would seem to be the saddest day in the history of American tennis. A few more such rousing victories and the prestige of this country in tennis will sink to a new low." At the time, Olmedo, who held a student visa, refused to file for U.S. citizenship, said he was content to remain a Peruvian citizen, and denied he was refusing to apply for U.S. citizenship to avoid being drafted into the military. Still, many Americans "took a dim view of the largest nation in the competition stooping to borrow a little player from Peru to win the Cup". Olmedo eventually became a U.S. citizen many years later.

Olmedo won the Australian Championships and the Wimbledon singles titles in 1959 and was the runner-up at the 1959 U.S. Championships, losing to Neale Fraser, whom he defeated in the Australian Championships earlier that year. At 1959 Wimbledon, he defeated Rod Laver in 71 minutes 6–4, 6–3, 6–4. Olmedo turned professional in 1960, and that year, won the US Pro title by beating Tony Trabert in the final.

Olmedo was inducted into the International Tennis Hall of Fame in 1987. He spent over 40 years teaching tennis at the Beverly Hills Hotel in California. His clients included Katharine Hepburn, Robert Duvall, and Jon Lovitz.

Olmedo's marriage to Ann Olmedo ended in divorce. He had a son Alejandro Jr., two daughters Amy and Angela, and four grand children. Olmedo died on December 9, 2020, at the age of 84, from cancer in Los Angeles.

== Grand Slam finals ==
=== Singles (2 titles, 1 runner-up) ===
| Result | Year | Championship | Surface | Opponent | Score |
|---|---|---|---|---|---|
| Win | 1959 | Australian Championships | Grass | (Australia) Neale Fraser | 6–1, 6–2, 3–6, 6–3 |
| Win | 1959 | Wimbledon | Grass | (Australia) Rod Laver | 6–4, 6–3, 6–4 |
| Loss | 1959 | U.S. Championships | Grass | (Australia) Neale Fraser | 3–6, 7–5, 2–6, 4–6 |

=== Doubles (1 title, 1 runner-up) ===
| Result | Year | Championship | Surface | Partner | Opponents | Score |
|---|---|---|---|---|---|---|
| Win | 1958 | U.S. Championships | Grass | (United States) Ham Richardson | (United States) Sam Giammalva (United States) Barry MacKay | 3–6, 6–3, 6–4, 6–4 |
| Loss | 1959 | U.S. Championships | Grass | (United States) Butch Buchholz | (Australia) Roy Emerson (Australia) Neale Fraser | 6–3, 3–6, 7–5, 4–6, 5–7 |

=== Mixed doubles (1 runner-up) ===
| Result | Year | Championship | Surface | Partner | Opponents | Score |
|---|---|---|---|---|---|---|
| Loss | 1958 | U.S. Championships | Grass | (Brazil) Maria Bueno | (Australia) Neale Fraser (United States) Margaret Osborne duPont | 3–6, 6–3, 7–9 |

== Grand Slam tournament performance timeline ==
Key
| W | F | SF | QF | #R | RR | Q# | DNQ | A | NH |

(W) winner; (F) finalist; (SF) semifinalist; (QF) quarterfinalist; (#R) rounds 4, 3, 2, 1; (RR) round-robin stage; (Q#) qualification round; (DNQ) did not qualify; (A) absent; (NH) not held; (SR) strike rate (events won / competed); (W–L) win–loss record.

=== Singles ===
| Tournament | 1951 | 1952 | 1953 | 1954 | 1955 | 1956 | 1957 | 1958 | 1959 | 1960 | 1961 | 1962 | 1963 | 1964 | 1965 | 1966 | 1967 | 1968 | 1969 | 1970 | 1971 | 1972 | SR |
|---|---|---|---|---|---|---|---|---|---|---|---|---|---|---|---|---|---|---|---|---|---|---|---|
| Australian Open | A | A | A | A | A | A | A | A | W | A | A | A | A | A | A | A | A | A | A | A | A | A | 1 / 1 |
| French Open | A | A | A | A | A | A | A | A | A | A | A | A | A | A | A | A | A | A | 1R | A | A | 1R | 0 / 2 |
| Wimbledon | A | A | A | A | A | A | 1R | A | W | A | A | A | A | A | A | A | A | 3R | 1R | A | A | 2R | 1 / 5 |
| US Open | 1R | A | A | A | 2R | 4R | 1R | QF | F | A | A | A | A | A | A | A | A | 3R | A | 2R | 1R | 2R | 0 / 10 |
| Strike rate | 0 / 1 | 0 / 0 | 0 / 0 | 0 / 0 | 0 / 1 | 0 / 1 | 0 / 2 | 0 / 1 | 2 / 3 | 0 / 0 | 0 / 0 | 0 / 0 | 0 / 0 | 0 / 0 | 0 / 0 | 0 / 0 | 0 / 0 | 0 / 2 | 0 / 2 | 0 / 1 | 0 / 1 | 0 / 3 | 2 / 18 |
