= Donald Dell =

American sports attorney, writer, commentator, and former tennis player

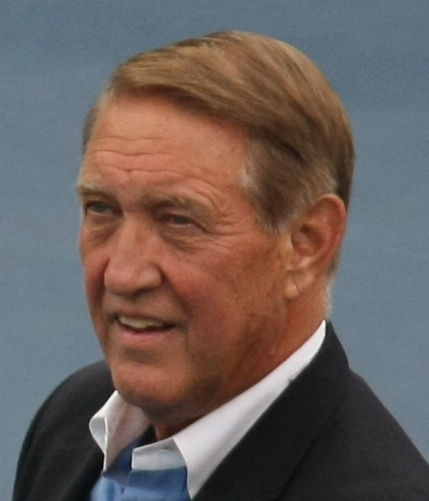
- Donald Dell at the Legg Mason Tennis Tournament in August 2009
- Full name: Donald L. Dell
- Country (sports): United States
- Born: June 17, 1938 (age 87); Savannah, Georgia, U.S.
- Height: 6 ft 1 in (1.85 m)
- Turned pro: 1954 (amateur tour)
- Retired: 1969
- Plays: Right-handed (one-handed backhand)
- Int. Tennis HoF: 2009 (member page)

Singles
- Career record: 25–26
- Highest ranking: No. 5 (1961 U.S. ranking)

Grand Slam singles results
- French Open: 2R (1965)
- Wimbledon: 3R (1961)
- US Open: QF (1961)
- Career record: 4–11

Donald L. Dell (born June 17, 1938) is an American sports attorney, writer, commentator, and former tennis player. Dell was the first sports agent in professional tennis, and represented Arthur Ashe, Stan Smith, Jimmy Connors, and Ivan Lendl during the golden age of pro tennis (1975 to 1985). He was also the founder of Professional Services (ProServ), one of the nation's first sports marketing firms established in 1970.

Dell is considered one of the fathers of sports marketing and the sports agent business along with IMG's Mark McCormack. Dell co-founded the Association of Tennis Professionals (ATP) in 1972 with Jack Kramer and Cliff Drysdale. Clients of ProServ dominated the leadership roles of the ATP in its formative years. ProServ expanded into basketball, and Dell signed Patrick Ewing, Michael Jordan, and other top NBA players. He wrote his first book, Minding Other People’s Business in 1989 about how to recruit, manage, market, and keep client athletes, and a second book in 2009, Never Make the First Offer. Dell negotiated two of the most successful shoe deals in all of sports: Michael Jordan’s Air Jordan line with Nike and the Stan Smith shoe with Adidas. Donald has a younger brother, Dick, who worked at ProServ and went to the University of Michigan and was Big Ten Tennis Champion.

== Playing career ==
Dell played his collegiate tennis at Yale University, where he was a three-time All-American (in 1958, 1959 and 1960). He reached the NCAA singles final in 1959 (losing to Whitney Reed of San Jose State University), and he was a semifinalist in 1960.

He played on the United States Davis Cup team in 1961 and 1963, and was the captain of the winning Davis Cup teams of 1968 and 1969. In 1961, Dell was a quarterfinalist at the US National Championships (now known as the US Open), and at the Cincinnati Masters, he was a singles finalist in 1959 and a semifinalist in 1958. In 1961, he and Mike Franks were the first Americans to play tennis in the Russian National Championships.

== Continued involvement with tennis ==
Dell received his undergraduate degree from Yale in 1960 and his law degree from the University of Virginia in 1964. He was an associate for the law firm of Hogan & Hartson from 1966 to 1967, and he was special assistant to Sargent Shriver from 1968 to 1969. He worked with the presidential campaigns of Robert F. Kennedy in 1968 and Sargent Shriver in 1972. He was also a founder of the ATP Players' Union with Jack Kramer and Cliff Drysdale in 1972, and he was co-founder with John A. Harris, head of Potomac Ventures, of the Citi Open tennis tournament in Washington, D.C. in 1969.

Dell is the vice chairman of the International Tennis Hall of Fame and a member of the board of directors for the Arthur Ashe Institute of Urban Health. Dell was a tennis commentator for PBS and NBC television in the 1970s and 1980s with Bud Collins and Barry MacKay, and he made appearances on WUSA, the CBS local affiliate station. He was the agent for MacKay. who died on June 15, 2012. Dell was elected to the International Tennis Hall of Fame in 2009.

Dell is currently the president for Media & Events at SPORTFIVE (formerly Lagardère Sports and Entertainment), and he continues to be involved in television rights negotiations, sports marketing consulting and tennis.

== Awards and honors ==
He was inducted into the ITA College Tennis Hall of Fame in 1993. He was elected to the International Tennis Hall of Fame in 2009.
