= Ham Richardson =

American tennis player

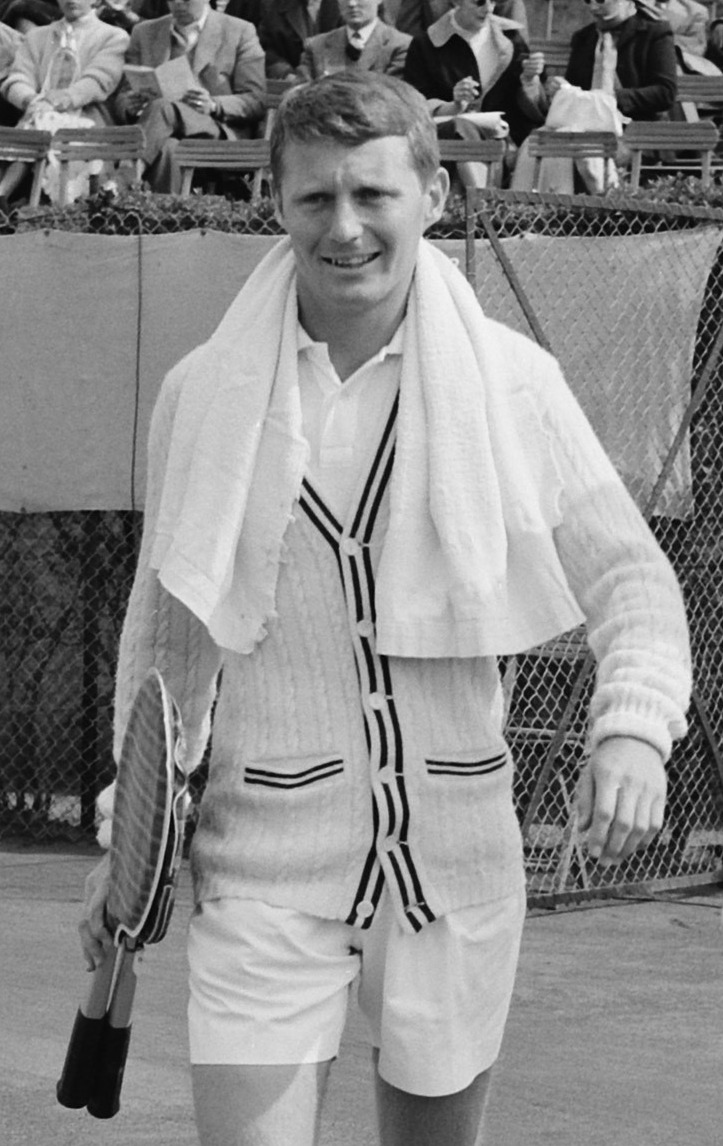
- Richardson in 1955
- Full name: Hamilton Farrar Richardson
- Country (sports): United States
- Born: August 24, 1933 Baton Rouge, Louisiana, U.S.
- Died: November 5, 2006 (aged 73) New York City, U.S.
- Turned pro: 1950 (amateur tour)
- Retired: 1969
- Plays: Right-handed (one-handed backhand)
- College: Tulane University

Singles
- Highest ranking: No. 3 (1956, Lance Tingay)

Grand Slam singles results
- Australian Open: QF (1953, 1954)
- French Open: SF (1955)
- Wimbledon: SF (1956)
- US Open: SF (1952, 1954)

Doubles

Grand Slam doubles results
- US Open: W (1958)

Team competitions
- Davis Cup: W (1954, 1958)

Hamilton Farrar Richardson (August 24, 1933 – November 5, 2006) was an American tennis player, who was active in the 1950s and 1960s.

== Life ==
Richardson was born in Baton Rouge, Louisiana. He earned a bachelor's degree in economics at Tulane University, where he won two NCAA Singles Championships (in 1953 and 1954). He was named a charter member of the Tulane University Athletic Hall of Fame.

He was named a Rhodes scholar and earned a master's degree at Oxford University during which he achieved the U.S. No. 1 ranking, both in 1956 and 1958 (Richardson was ranked in the U.S. Top 10 in nine other years). Lance Tingay of The Daily Telegraph ranked Richardson the World No. 3 in 1956, No. 6 in 1958, No. 7 in 1955 and No. 10 in 1954.

Richardson reached four Grand Slam singles semifinals. At the French championships in 1955, Richardson lost in the semifinals to Tony Trabert. In 1956, Richardson reached the Wimbledon semifinals (beating Neale Fraser, then lost to Lew Hoad). At the U.S. championships, Richardson reached the semifinals in 1952 (losing to Gardnar Mulloy) and 1954 (beating Hoad before losing to Vic Seixas). In 1958, he won a U.S. National doubles title in 1958 with Alex Olmedo and reached the mixed doubles final at the Australian National Championship with Maureen Connolly.

At the Cincinnati Masters, Richardson reached two singles finals, losing in 1950 to Glenn Bassett and in 1953 to Tony Trabert, and won two doubles titles, in 1950 with George Richards, and in 1953 with Trabert. He played on seven U.S. Davis Cup teams, including the winning Cup teams of 1954 and 1958. He was 20–2 in Davis Cup play.

After retiring from tennis, he founded Richardson and Associates, a New York investment and venture capital firm.

== Personal life ==
Richardson had three children from his first marriage, which ended in divorce. He was later married to author and editor Midge Turk Richardson from 1974 until his death from complications from diabetes in 2006.

== Grand Slam finals ==
=== Doubles: 2 (1 title, 1 runner-up) ===
Result	Year	Championship	Surface	Partner	Opponents	Score
Loss	1956	U.S. Championships	Grass	(United States) Vic Seixas	(Australia) Lew Hoad (Australia) Ken Rosewall	6–2, 6–2, 3–6, 6–4
Win	1958	U.S. Championships	Grass	(United States) Alex Olmedo	(United States) Sam Giammalva (United States) Barry MacKay	3–6, 6–3, 6–4, 6–4

=== Mixed doubles (1 runner-up) ===
Result	Year	Championship	Surface	Partner	Opponents	Score
Loss	1953	Australian Championships	Grass	(United States) Maureen Connolly	(United States) Julia Sampson (Australia) Rex Hartwig	6–4, 6–3

== Rankings ==
Richardson's Top Ten U.S. Rankings

- 1951 – 9
- 1952 – 7
- 1953 – 6
- 1954 – 3
- 1955 – 7
- 1956 – 1
- 1957 – N/A
- 1958 – 1
- 1959 – N/A
- 1960 – N/A
- 1961 – N/A
- 1962 – 3
- 1963 – 7
- 1964 – 7
- 1965 – 6
