= Barry MacKay (tennis) =

American tennis player, tournament director and broadcaster

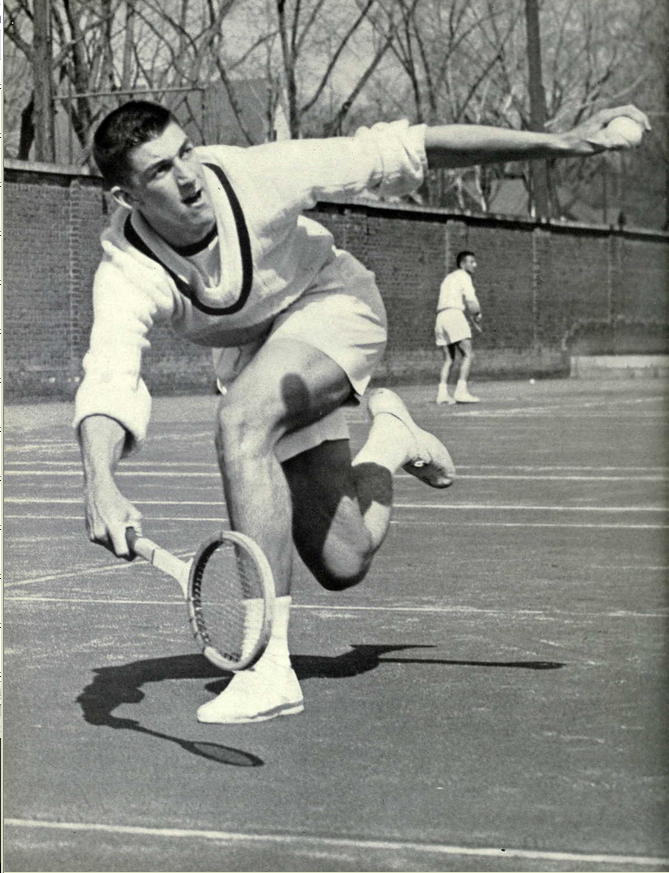
- MacKay in Michigan, 1957
- Country (sports): United States
- Born: August 31, 1935 Cincinnati, Ohio, United States
- Died: June 15, 2012 (aged 76) San Francisco, United States
- Height: 6 ft 3 in (1.91 m)
- Turned pro: 1961 (#1 US amateur 1960)
- Retired: 1970 (#9 US ranking)
- Plays: Right-handed (one-handed backhand)

Singles
- Career titles: 29
- Highest ranking: No. 4 (1959, Lance Tingay)

Grand Slam singles results
- Australian Open: SF (1959)
- French Open: QF (1960)
- Wimbledon: SF (1959)
- US Open: QF (1959)

Other tournaments
- Professional majors
- US Pro: SF (1961, 1962)
- Wembley Pro: QF (1961, 1962, 1967)
- French Pro: QF (1961, 1963, 1967)

Doubles
- Career titles: 11

Barry Bruce MacKay (August 31, 1935 – June 15, 2012) was an American tennis player, tournament director and broadcaster. He was ranked #1 in the U.S. in 1960.

While competing in college for the University of Michigan, he won the Singles title of the 1957 NCAA Men's Tennis Championship to clinch the team title for Michigan over Tulane ten to nine, by defeating Sam Giammalva in a five set Final. His teammates were: Mark Jaffe, Dick Potter, Jon Erickson, John Harris, Dale Jensen, George Korol and Dick Cohen. He was also a finalist in the 1957 NCAA Doubles competition with Dick Potter. He won five Big Ten Conference titles, 1956-57 (2) in singles and 1955-57 (3) in doubles.

He reached the Quarterfinals of Wimbledon in 1958 and 1960 and the Semifinals in 1959, and was a Doubles finalist at the U.S. Open in 1958, with Sam Giammalva.

In 1959, when he reached the Singles Semifinals at the Australian Championships he lost to Alex Olmedo in five sets, and in the Semifinals at The Championships, Wimbledon he lost to Rod Laver in five sets. He then reached the Quarterfinals of the U.S. Championships, losing to Tut Bartzen.

In 1960, he was seeded No. 1 at the French Championships, and reached the Quarterfinals losing to Orlando Sirola. Prior to Paris he had won the Italian Championships in early May, beating Defending Champion, Luis Ayala, in five sets. MacKay twice won the Pacific Coast Championships, first in 1959, and again in 1960.

MacKay made eight appearances at the Cincinnati Open, amassing a 9-8 record in singles and reaching the round of 16 three times (1953, 1955 and 1957).

In 1960, he won ten more tournament titles, reached the quarterfinals at the U.S. National Championships, and earned the No. 1 ranking in the United States.

== Early years ==
MacKay was born in Cincinnati, Ohio, and but moved to Dayton, Ohio in 1950 (at age 15), where he attended Oakwood High School. That same year, he won the National Boys Indoor Doubles Championship. He was the Ohio State High School Tennis Champion in 1952 and 1953. He was ranked #16 in the National Juniors.

== Playing career ==
MacKay enjoyed a 17-year career as an amateur and a professional tennis player, winning 29 singles titles and 11 doubles. He started his tennis career in the 1950, as National Boys Indoor champion and then in 1952, as the Ohio State High School Champion.

From there, he enrolled at the University of Michigan in 1953 along with Mark Jaffe and Dick Potter to form a strong team under tennis coach Bill Murphy. Entering college Barry was ranked #16 in the Juniors, Mark Jaffe #10, and Dick Potter #20. Barry practiced often with Professor and ranked player Andy Paton Jr., who made him a much better player. He won five Big Ten Conference Championships while at the University of Michigan — 2 Singles Championships in 1956 and 1957, and 3 Doubles Championships with partner, Dick Potter, in 1955, 1956, and 1957.

In June 1957, MacKay won the Singles title at the NCAA Men's Tennis Championship, defeating Sammy Giammalva of Texas in five sets at Salt Lake City. This win enabled the Michigan Wolverines to capture their first and only NCAA Team Championship over Tulane University, 10-9. He was the first Big Ten player to win the NCAA Singles Title, was runner-up for the Doubles Title with partner, Dick Potter, and was the first Michigan Tennis player to be named as an All-American.

MacKay played on five United States Davis Cup teams from 1956 to 1960, and in three final rounds. The 1958 Davis Cup team of Alex Olmedo, Ham Richardson, and Barry beat Australia for the Championship. In 1959, he beat Rod Laver 7-5, 6-4, 6-1 in the Davis Cup Finals at Forest Hills. He is the only American player to beat Laver in Davis Cup competition.

After winning the NCAA Singles Title in June 1957, MacKay played amateur tennis for three additional summers. In 1958, he reached the Quarterfinals of Wimbledon and the Finals of the U.S. Doubles Championships. In 1959, he lost to Alex Olmedo in five sets at the Australian Semifinals and at Wimbledon, he lost in the Semifinals to Rod Laver in 87 games over five sets. He also reached the Quarterfinals of the U.S. Championships losing to Bob Mark.

In 1960, he was ranked as the No. 1 amateur in the U.S. after reaching the Quarterfinals of Wimbledon and the U.S. Championships, and winning 11 tournaments: Atlanta, Buffalo, Dallas, River Oaks, River Forest U.S. Clay Court Championships, Rome (Italian Championship), New York Indoors Nationals, Los Angeles Pacific Southwest, San Francisco Pacific Coast Tuscaloosa, and Victoria, Australia. MacKay defeated defending champion, Luis Ayala, in the final of the Italian Championship in five sets(considered the 5th Major) and was seeded No. 1 at the 1960 French Championships, where he lost in the Quarterfinals to Sirola.

In 1961, MacKay turned professional. He played three years with the Jack Kramer Professional Tennis Tour. He recalled the Kramer Tour, "Matches were played in one city after another on a nightly basis across the country and around the world. It was a barnstorming type of tour."

== Grand Slam finals ==
=== Doubles: 1 runner-up ===
Result	Year	Championship	Surface	Partner	Opponents	Score
Loss	1958	U.S. Championships	Grass	(United States) Sam Giammalva	(United States) Alex Olmedo (United States) Ham Richardson	6–3, 3–6, 4–6, 4–6

== Directing tournaments ==
In 1964, MacKay moved to California and worked for Jack Kramer on the Professional Tennis Tour. He remained with Kramer through 1966, when he moved to Sausalito, CA. In 1970, MacKay bought the controlling interest in the ATP Pacific Coast Championships in Berkeley, California, when he was ranked #9 in the U.S. He convinced banker Byron Leydecker to sponsor the tournament and it became the Redwood Bank Pacific Coast Open. In 1973, he started a company named BMK Sports, which operated his Major Tennis Event that became known as the SAP Open when he sold in 1995. Barry played his last tournament in Palm Beach, Florida in 1973. He was the first known as Mr. Wild Card for adding Jimmy Connors, John McEnroe, and Bjorn Borg, and others to his tournament draw even though they did not qualify. He was influential in Bay Area tennis circles and contributed his time and money.

Barry's closest friends were his agent, Donald Dell, tennis historian, Bud Collins, Stanford Tennis Coach, Dick Gould, College Hall of Famer, Mike Franks, and player/broadcaster, Brad Gilbert.

== Broadcasting career ==
Starting in the 1970s, MacKay became a tennis broadcaster. In 2001, he helped launch Tennis Channel as a broadcaster. Over his 30-year broadcasting career, MacKay teamed with Arthur Ashe, Bud Collins, Donald Dell, Billie Jean King, Martina Navratilova, Jimmy Connors, Chris Evert, John McEnroe, Pam Shriver, Tracy Austin, Justin Gimelstob, and Leif Shiras. He was the on-air voice for American broadcasts of the U.S. Open, Wimbledon, French Open, Australian Open, and many ATP and WTA tournaments. He also provided color commentary, play-by-play, and lead analysis for The Tennis Channel, DirecTV, and Versus. He spent 30 years with HBO broadcasting Wimbledon, and the US Open on USA Network. He provided color commentary on Fox Sports Network, and served as the play-by-play announcer for the NBC Sports coverage of tennis at the 2008 Summer Olympics in China.

== Death ==
Mackay died in San Francisco, California on June 15, 2012, aged 76, after a long illness. He is survived by his wife, Michele, and daughter, Kelly.

== Honors ==
- Inducted into the University of Michigan Athletic Hall of Honor in 1980.
- Inducted into the Cincinnati Tennis Hall of Fame in 2003.
- Inducted into the Intercollegiate Tennis Hall of Fame in 1987.
- Presented the Bob Hope Award for "Amateur Athlete of the Year" in 1960.
- Inducted into the Los Angeles Open Hall of Fame in 2005.
- Honored by the Indian Wells Masters tournament for his life's contributions to Tennis on March 10, 2013.
