= Blue Gray Championships =

Defunct tennis tournament
- Tour: ILTF World Circuit (1954–70)
- Founded: 1949; 77 years ago
- Abolished: 1978; 48 years ago
- Location: Montgomery, Alabama, United States
- Venue: Montgomery Country Club; Huntingdon College; Lagoon Park Tennis Center; O’Connor Tennis Center
- Surface: Clay / outdoor

The Blue Gray Championships was a men's and women's open international tennis tournament was founded in 1949. Also known as the Blue Gray Invitation the tournament was first played at the Montgomery Country Club, Montgomery, Alabama, United States. It was played annually until 1978 as an individual competition when it was discontinued. In 1984 it was revived as team only competition called the Blue Gray National Tennis Classic that is still active.

== History ==
The tournament was conceived by Jack Bushman the President of the Southern Lawn Tennis Association. In 1949 he established the event was based upon the Sugar Bowl Tennis Championships. This tournament was to be played before the Blue–Gray Football Classic was being held and first occurred in 1950. The main difference between this event and the Sugar Bowl tennis event, it was to be an open international tournament for college (university) players rather than junior players. The inaugural winners of the singles events were Jack Tuero (men) and Elinor Shaw (women). The tournament also featured doubles events.

The championships were held at the Montgomery Country Club from inception until 1968. In 1969 he moved location to Huntingdon College but was not held that year. In 1973 it moved the Lagoon Park Tennis Center before moving to the O’Connor Tennis Center during the last few editions all of were in Montgomery, Alabama. In 1978 the event was discontinued as an individual competition, however exhibition events under the brand name the Blue Gray Invitation continued to held. In 1983 the format for the tournament was a changed to become team only competition to be played as a lead up event to the NCAA Championships. In 1984 the first edition of the rebranded Blue Gray National Tennis Classic was held.

== Finals ==
Notes: Where a runner up is not shown or the score sections have been blanked.

=== Men's singles ===
Year	Winners	Runners-up	Score
1949	(United States) Jack Tuero	(United States) Herbert "Buddy" Behrens	6–0, 6–2, 7–9, 9–11, 6–1.
1950	(Chile) Ricardo Balbiers	(United States) Wade Herren	6–4, 6–1, 6–2.
1951	(United States) Jack Tuero (2)	(United States) Tony Trabert	9–7, 9–7, 0–6, 5–7, 6–1.
1952	(United States) Don Kaiser	(United States) Wade Herren	6–3, 1–6, 6–3, 4–6, 7–5
1953	(United States) Ham Richardson	(United States) Don Kaiser	6–1, 6–2, 6–3.
1954	(United States) Allen Morris	(Brazil) José Agüero Umatino	9–7, 6–4, 0–6, 6–4.
1955	(United States) Eddie Moylan	(United States) Allen Morris	3–6, 6–3, 6–2, 15–13.
1956	(United States) Wade Herren	(South Africa) Johann Kupferburger	4–6, 7–5, 6–0.
1957	(United States) William Quillian	(United States) Barry MacKay (tennis)	6–4, 6–4, 6–4.
1958	(Mexico) Gustavo Palafox	(United States) Ronald Holmberg	6–4, 6–2, 2–6, 3–6, 6–4.
1959	(United States) Ronald Holmberg	(United States) Gerald Moss	6–4, 4–6, 6–4, 2–6, 6–4.
1960	(United States) Crawford Henry	(United States) Henry "Hank" Jungle	7–5 6–4.
1961	(United States) Myron Franks	(United States) Billy Lenoir	6–1, 8–6, 6–2.
1962	(Canada) Mike Belkin	(United States) Norm Perry	8–6, 4–6, 6–4.
1963	(United States) Billy Lenoir	(United States) Andrew Lloyd	6–1, 2–6, 6–2.
1964	(United States) Andrew Lloyd	(Australia) Robert Brien	1–6, 6–3, 6–1.
1965	(United States) J. W. Bitsy Harrison	(United States) Bill Tym	11–9, 6–2.
1966	(United States) Tom Edlefsen	(United States) Cliff Buchholz	6–2, 6–3.
1967	(Canada) Mike Belkin (2)	(United States) Herb Fitzgibbon	9–11, 7–5, 6–2.
1968	(Mexico) Joaquín Loyo-Mayo	(Mexico) Vicente Zarazúa	6–1, 6–1.
↓ Open era ↓
1970	(South Africa) Peter van Lingen	(United States) Paul Gerken	11–9 4–6 6–3.
1971	(Venezuela) Humphrey Hose	(Canada) Mike Belkin	7–5 6–0 7–6.
1972	(Venezuela) Humphrey Hose (2)	(United States) Fred McNair	7–6, 6–7, 6–3.
1973	(United States) Raz Reid	(India) Sashi Menon	6–3, 7–6.
1974	(United States) Victor Amaya	(United States) Tim Vann	7–6, 5–7, 7–7.
1975	(United States) Butch Walts	(Puerto Rico) Fred DeJesus	6–4, 6–4.
1976	(United States) Terry Moor	(United States) Nick Saviano	6–4, 6–4.
1977	(United States) Terry Moor (2)	(Mexico) Marcelo Lara	6–2, 6–3.
1978	(United States) Warren Eber	(South Africa) Eddie Edwards	4–6, 7–6, 6–3.
For the team event see Blue Gray National Tennis Classic

=== Women's singles ===
(incomplete roll)

Year	Winners	Runners-up	Score
1949	(United States) Elinor Shaw	(United States) Ewing McAllester	6–4, 8–6
1950	(United States) Suzanne Herr	(United States) Lucy Masterson	3–6, 6–4, 6–4
1953	(United States) Jean Clarke	(United States) Laura Lou Kunnen	6–4, 6–4
1954	(United States) Jean Clarke (2)	(United States) Pat Stewart	6–3, 6–3
1955	(Mexico) Yola Ramirez	(United States) Jean Clarke	7–9, 6–3, 6–3
1956	(United States) Karol Fageros	(Mexico) Yola Ramirez	6–3, 6–3
1957	(United States) Owen McHaney	(France) Raymonde Veber Jones	6–4, 3–6, 6–4
1958	(United States) Owen McHaney (2)	(Mexico) Marta Hernández	8–6, 6–4
1959	(United States) Carol Hanks	(Australia) Marie Martin	6–4, 7–5
1960	(Canada) Susan Butt	(United States) Linda Vail	6–2, 6–2
1961	(United States) Roberta Alison	(Brazil) Mary Habicht	6–4, 2–6, 6–1
1962	(United States) Roberta Alison (2)	(Brazil) Mary Habicht	6–0, 6–3
1963	(United States) Justina Bricka	(United States) Stephanie DeFina	3–6, 8–6, 6–2
1964	(United States) Roberta Alison (3)	(United States) Becky Vest	6–0, 6–4
1965	(United States) Roberta Alison (4)	(United States) Stephanie DeFina	3–6, 7–5, 6–0
1966	(United States) Becky Vest	(United States) Linda Tuero	6–3, 2–6, 6–2
1968	(United States) Linda Tuero	(United States) Emilie Burrer	6–0, 6–4
↓ Open era ↓
1970	(United States) Laura duPont	(United States) Kathy Kraft	6–1, 6–2
1972	(United States) Pat Bostrom	(United States) Beverly Barger	6–4, 6–2
1973	(United States) Betsy Butler	(United States) Susan Vinton	6–4, 3–6, 6–2
1974	(United States) Linda Rupert	(United States) Betsy Butler	6–1, 6–4
1975	(United States) Beth Norton	(United States) Candy Reynolds	6–2, 6–3
1977	(United States) Kate Latham	(United States) Kathy Kuykendall	7–6, 6–2
For the team event see Blue Gray National Tennis Classic
