= Tennessee Valley Open Championships =

Tournament information
- Tour: USTA Southern
- Founded: 1934
- Location: Chattanooga; United States
- Venue: Manker Patten Tennis Club
- Surface: Clay / outdoor

The Tennessee Valley Open Championships is a clay court tennis tournament founded in 1934 as Tennessee Valley Invitational. It is currently played at the Manker Patten Tennis Club in Chattanooga, Tennessee, United States.

== History ==
The tournament was founded in June 1934 at the Chattanooga Tennis Club, initially featuring only men's singles and doubles events. The following year, in 1935, women's singles and doubles draws were officially inaugurated.

During its golden era, the tournament was a prominent stop on the ILTF World Circuit. As a regular international fixture, it consistently attracted top-tier global players to Chattanooga until the early 1970s.

Following the open era transitions, the event evolved into a USTA Regional tournament. Today, it primarily serves as a competitive showcase for elite, upcoming collegiate players and regional talent.

== Past finals ==
=== Men's singles ===
(incomplete roll)

Year	Champion	Runner-Up	Score
1934	(United States) Martin Buxby	(United States) Robert Lake	9–7, 6–3
1935	(United States) Martin Buxby (2)	(United States) Arthur Hendrix	6–0, 8–6, 6–3
1936	(United States) Frank Guernsey	(United States) Archie Henderson	6–4, 2–6, 6–2, 6–3
1938	(United States) Arthur Hendrix	(United States) Bobby Riggs	4–6, 4–6, 8–6, 6–4, 6–2
1939	(United States) Bobby Riggs	(United States) Wayne Sabin	6–3, 6–4, 6–1
1940	(United States) Archie Henderson	(United States) Bill Talbert	6–3, 6–3, 6–1
1941	(United States) Bobby Riggs (2)	(United States) Bill Talbert	7–5, 3–6, 6–4, 6–4
1949	(United States) Bill Talbert	(United States) Tony Trabert	6–3, 6–3, 6–1
1953	(United States) Ed Rubinoff	(United States) Gordon E. Warden	8–6, 6–2, 3–6, 6–1
1954	(United States) Ed Rubinoff (2)	(Brazil) José Agüero	6–1, 6–1, 2–6, 6–0
1956	(United States) Frank Spears	(United States) Shaw Emmons	7–5, 4–6, 4–6, 6–4, 6–4
1957	(United States) Grant Golden	(United States) C. Maxwell (Max) Brown	6–1, 6–0,
1958	(Peru) Alex Olmedo	(United States) Grant Golden	6–0, 6–2, 6–0
1959	(United States) Tut Bartzen	(United States) John C. Skogstad	6–2, 6–2, 6–0
1960	(Ecuador) Eduardo Zuleta	(United States) Billy Lenoir	4–6, 6–3, 6–2
1961	(United States) Billy Lenoir	(Ecuador) Miguel Olvera	3–6, 6–2, 8–6
1962	(United States) Clark Graebner	(United States) Marty Riessen	6–1, 6–3
1963	(United States) Marty Riessen	(United States) Andy Lloyd	6–1, 6–3
1964	(United States) Jerry Cromwell	(United States) Walter R. Johnson	3–6, 6–1, 6–2, 6–4
1965	(United States) Billy Higgins	(United States) Bill Tym	6–4, 6–1
1966	(Mexico) Joaquin Loyo Mayo	(United States) Ronald (Ron) Goldman	6–8, 6–3, 6–4
1967	(Chile) Jaime Fillol	(Mexico) Joaquin Loyo Mayo	6–4, 4–6, 7–5
1968	(Mexico) Joaquin Loyo Mayo (2)	(Chile) Jaime Fillol	8–6, 7–5
1969	(Mexico) Joaquin Loyo Mayo (3)	(United States) Zan Guerry	7–5, 6–8, 6–1
1970	(United States) Paul Gerken	(United States) Jeff Borowiak	6–2, 11–9
1976	(United States) Pat Dupre	(United States) Bill Scanlon	6–2, 6–1

=== Women's singles ===
(incomplete roll)

Year	Champion	Runner-Up	Score
1935	(United States) Catherine Wolfe	(United States) Eunice Dean	12–10, 6–3
1940	(United States) Gracyn Wheeler	(United Kingdom) Mary Hardwick	7–5, 6–0
1941	(United States) Pauline Betz	(United States) Sarah Palfrey Cooke	9–7, 1–6, 9–7
1950	(Romania) Magda Rurac	(United States) Laura Lou Jahn	7–5, 11–9
1956	(United States) Marilyn Voges	(United States) Lynne Lawson	3–6, 6–4, 6–3
1957	(France) Raymonde Veber Jones	(Mexico) Martha Hernandez	3–6, 6–4, 6–3
1958	(Mexico) Martha Hernandez	(United States) Carol Hanks	6–2, 6–4
1959	(Australia) Marie Toomey Martin	(United States) Carol Hanks	2–6, 6–2, 6–2
1960	(United States) Carol Hanks	(United States) Justina Bricka	4–6, 6–2, 6–4
1961	(United States) Mary Habicht	(United States) Roberta Alison	6–3, 6–4
1963	(United States) Stephanie DeFina	(United States) Putsy Trice	6–3, 6–4
1964	(United States) Patsy Rippy	(United States) Owen McHaney	7–5, 6–3
1965	(United States) Roberta Alison	(United States) Stephanie DeFina	6–2, 7–5
1966	(United States) Becky Vest	(United States) Ann Moore	6–2, 6–4
1969	(United States) Linda Tuero	(Uruguay) Fiorella Bonicelli	6–2, 6–0
1970	(United States) Linda Tuero (2)	(United States) Becky Vest	6–2, 6–3
1976	(United States) Diane Desfor	(United States) Stephanie Tolleson	6–3, 6–3
