= Florida State Open Championships =

Defunct tennis tournament
- Tour: ILTF World Circuit (1949–72); ILTF Independent Tour (1970-73) men (1971-73) women
- Founded: 1910; 115 years ago
- Abolished: 1973; 52 years ago
- Location: Delray Beach; Jacksonville; Palm Beach; Orlando; Sarasota; Winter Park
- Venue: Various
- Surface: Clay

The Florida State Open Championships also known as the Florida State Championships or Florida Open was an open international men's and women's clay court tennis tournament founded in 1910 as the Winter Championships of Florida. It was first organised by the Palm Beach Tennis Club and first played on clay courts adjacent to the Royal Poinciana Hotel, Palm Beach Florida, United States. The international tournament was played at other locations throughout its run until September 1972 when it was discontinued as part of the ILTF Independent Tour.

== History ==
In 1910 the open Winter Championships of Florida organised by the Palm Beach Tennis Club was inaugurated on clay courts adjacent to the Royal Poinciana Hotel, Palm Beach Florida, United States. In 1922 the edition of the tournament was also valid as the Palm Beach Championships.

The championships were held in the following locations throughout its run in Delray Beach, Jacksonville, Palm Beach, Orlando, Sarasota and Winter Park. The ILTF Independent Tour, a series of worldwide tournaments not part of the men's Grand Prix Circuit or women's the WTA Tour. The tournament has continued until the 2020s where it is now a closed tournament (Florida players only) known as the USTA Florida Adult State Championships.

== Finals ==
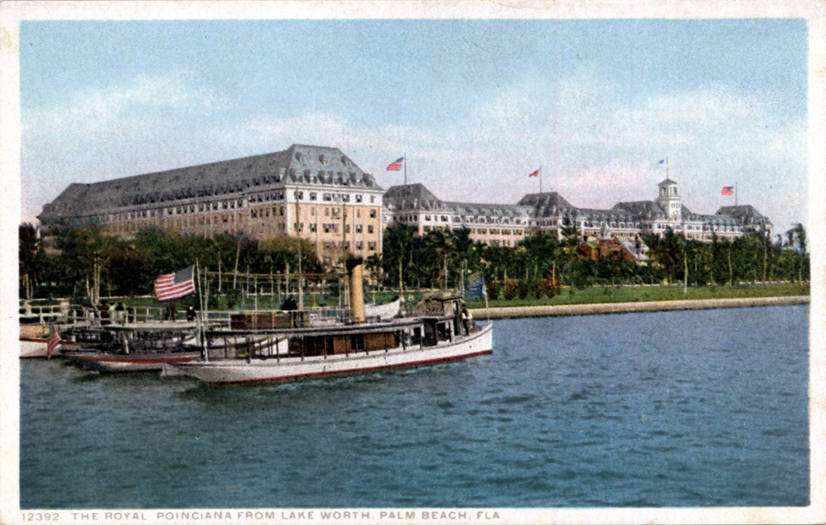
The Royal Poinciana Hotel from Lake Worth, Palm Beach c. 1909 was the venue for the championships from 1910 till 1931.

=== Men's singles ===
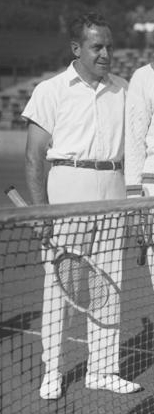
Frank Hunter in 1929 won 3 men's singles championship titles.

(incomplete roll)

Winter Championships of Florida
Year	Location	Champions	Runners-up	Score
1912	Palm Beach	(United States) Theodore Pell	(United States) Percy D. Siverd	6–3, 4–6, 6–1 6–1.
Florida State Championships
1919	Palm Beach	(United States) Fred H. Harris	(United States) Craig Biddle	6–3, 4–6, 6–1, 6–1.
1920	Palm Beach	(Japan) Ichiya Kumagae	(United States) Craig Biddle	6–1, 6–3.
1921	Palm Beach	(United States) R. Norris Williams	(Japan) Ichiya Kumagae	3–6, 6–4, 6–4, 6–1.
1922	Palm Beach	(United States) Fritz Bastian	(United States) G. Carlton Shafer	6–1, 6–2, 6–3.
1923	Palm Beach	(United States) Frank Hunter	(United States) Philip B. Hawk	6–2, 6–3, 6–2.
1924	Palm Beach	(United States) Vinnie Richards	(United States) Gustave Feuer	6–1, 6–1.
1925	Palm Beach	(United States) Bill Tilden II	(Spain) Manuel Alonso Areizaga	6–3, 7–9, 6–1, 6–4.
1926	Palm Beach	(United States) Vinnie Richards (2)	(Japan) Takeichi Harada	4–6, 6–1, 6–1, 6–3.
1927	Palm Beach	(United States) Bill Tilden II (2)	(Spain) Manuel Alonso Areizaga	7–5, 6–8, 3–6, 6–0, 6–4.
1928	Palm Beach	(United States) Frank Hunter (2)	(United States) John F. Hennessey	6–4, 15–13 6–2.
1929	Palm Beach	(United States) Frank Hunter (3)	(United States) John F. Hennessey	1–6, 6–1, 9–7 7–5.
1930	Palm Beach	(United States) J. Gilbert Hall	(United States) R. Norris Williams	6–4, 8–6, 6–4.
1931	Palm Beach	(United States) J. Gilbert Hall (2)	(United States) Phil Neer	6–2, 6–3, 2–6, 6–1.
1936	Orlando	(United States) Charles Harris	(United States) Gardnar Mulloy	7–5, 6–4, 4–6 6–0.
1937	Orlando	(United States) Wayne Sabin	(United States) Elwood Cooke	6–1, 6–3, 6–4.
1938	Orlando	(United States) Elwood Cooke	(United States) Frank Kovacs	8–6, 6–4, 6–0.
1939	Orlando	(United States) Wayne Sabin (2)	(United States) Gene Mako	8–6, 4–6, 6–3, 2–6, 6–1.
1940	Orlando	(United States) Elwood Cooke (2)	(United States) Henry Prusoff	6–4, 6–1, 6–4.
1941	Orlando	(United States) Frank Kovacs	(United States) Don McNeill	6–2, 6–4, 6–0.
1946	Orlando	(United States) Frank Guernsey	(Argentina) Alejo Russell	6–3, 11–9, 6–1.
1947	Orlando	(United States) Jack Tuero	(United States) Frank Guernsey	6–4, 5–7, 6–4.
1948	Orlando	(United States) Pancho Gonzales	(Peru) Enrique Buse	6–2, 3–6, 6–3, 6–3.
1949	Orlando	(United States) Gardner 'Gardy' Larned	(Peru) Herbert 'Buddy' Behrens	6–2, 6–2, 5–7, 6–0.
1950	Orlando	(Chile) Ricardo Balbiers	(United States) Tony Vincent	8–6, 6–4, 6–4.
1951	Orlando	(United States) Tony Vincent	(Canada) Henri Rochon	6–0, 6–3, 6–1.
1954	Orlando	(United States) Malcolm Fox	(United States) Tony Vincent	6–3, 7–5, 2–6, 6–3.
1955	Winter Park	(United States) Eddie Moylan	(France) Jean-Noël Grinda	6–0, 6–2, 6–1.
1956	Winter Park	(Brazil) Armando Vieira	(United States) Ben Sobieraj	6–0, 6–2, 6–1.
1957	Sarasota	(United States) Ben Sobieraj	(West Germany) Peter Scholl	5–7, 6–4, 7–5, 6–3.
1958	Orlando	(United States) Jack Frost	(United States) Tony Vincent	6–0, 6–4.
1959	Orlando	(Colombia) William Álvarez	(Sweden) Birger Folke	6–0, 6–4, 6–1.
1960	Winter Park	(United Kingdom) Mike Davies	(Australia) Don Candy	6–2, 6–0, 6–4.
1961	Orlando	(United States) Whitney Reed	(Ecuador) Miguel Olvera	7–5, 6–4, 8–10, 5–7, 6–3.
1963	Winter Park	(Ecuador) Miguel Olvera	(Ecuador) Eduardo Zuleta	6–3, 6–3, 4–6, 6–2.
1964	Winter Park	(Brazil) Thomaz Koch	(Ecuador) Pancho Guzmán	6–2, 6–0, 6–0.
1965	Orlando	(Greece) Nicky Kalogeropoulos	(Mexico) Manuel Gallardo	8–10, 8–6, 6–3, 8–6.
1966	Winter Park	(United States) Jamie Presslie	(Ecuador) Eduardo Zuleta	6–4, 6–2.
1967	Orlando	(Ecuador) Eduardo Zuleta	(Canada) Keith Carpenter	6–4, 6–4.
1968	Orlando	(United States) Gene Scott	(United States) Ron Holmberg	6–4, 6–3.
↓ Open era ↓
Florida State Open Championships
1969	Orlando	(Ecuador) Eduardo Zuleta (2)	(Australia) Allan McDonald	6–4, 6–2.
1970	Orlando	(Ecuador) Miguel Olvera	(Canada) Mike Belkin	6–2, 7–5.
1971	Orlando	(United States) Frank Froehling III	(Canada) Mike Belkin	6–2, 3–6, 6–4.
1972	Orlando	(Socialist Federal Republic of Yugoslavia) Nikola Špear	(Canada) Mike Belkin	6–1, 6–4.

=== Women' singles ===
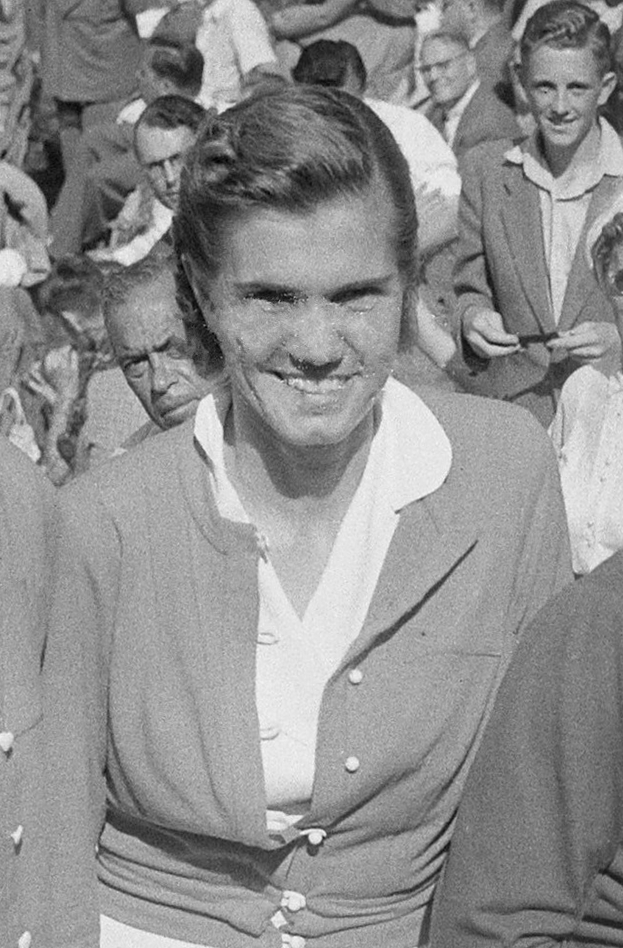
Shirley Fry in 1953 won 4 women's singles championship titles.

(incomplete roll)

Winter Championships of Florida
Year	Location	Champions	Runners-up	Score
1912	Palm Beach	(United States) Alice Cunningham	(United States) Adelaide Chatfield-Taylor	6–4, 6–3
1913	Palm Beach	(United States) Adelaide Browning	(United States) Mrs Haight	6–0, 6–1
1914	Palm Beach	(United States) Teresa Schwab Wood	(United States) Hilda Holmes	6–2, 1–6, 8–6
1915	Palm Beach	(United States) Maud Barger-Wallach	(United States) Mary Snyder	6–4, 6–3
1916	Palm Beach	(United States) Mary Bigelow Bremer	(United States) Teresa Schwab Wood	6–3, 6–4
1917	Palm Beach	(United States) Martha Guthrie	(United States) Margaret Taylor	6–0, 6–3
Florida State Championships
1919	Palm Beach	(Norway) Molla Bjurstedt	(United States) Teresa Schwab Wood	6–1, 6–2
1920	Palm Beach	(United States) Phyllis Walsh	(United States) Teresa Schwab Wood	6–1, 6–2
1921	Palm Beach	(United States) Phyllis Walsh (2)	(United States) Teresa Schwab Wood	6–1, 6–1
1922	Palm Beach	(United States) Clare Cassell	(United States) Phyllis Walsh	4–6, 7–5, 6–4
1923	Palm Beach	(United States) Clare Cassell (2)	(United States) Anna Townsend Godfrey	9–7, 6–2
1924	Palm Beach	(United States) Molla Bjurstedt Mallory (2)	(United States) Leslie Bancroft	9–7, 9–7
1925	Palm Beach	(United States) Molla Bjurstedt Mallory (3)	(United States) Julie Makin Stenz	6–4, 7–5
1926	Palm Beach	(United States) Elizabeth Ryan	(United States) Mary Browne	6–4, 6–0
1927	Palm Beach	(United States) Clare Cassell (3)	(United States) Julie Makin Stenz	6–1, 6–4
1928	Palm Beach	(United States) Eleanor Goss	(United States) Clare Cassell	6–1, 4–6, 6–1
1929	Palm Beach	(United States) Eleanor Goss (2)	(United States) Eleanor Cottman	6–3, 6–0
1930	Palm Beach	(United States) Julie Makin Stenz	(United States) Virginia Hilleary	6–0, 6–3
1931	Palm Beach	(United States) Eleanor Goss (3)	(United States) Marjorie Gladman Van Ryn	6–1, 7–5
1934	Orlando	(United States) Catherine Sample	(United States) Virginia Hilleary	6–4, 6–4
1935	Orlando	(United States) Beth Lancaster	(United States) Catherine Sample	8–6, 6–4
1937	Orlando	(United States) Catherine Sample (2)	(United States) Eunice Evers	6–2, 2–6, 8–6
1938	Orlando	(United States) Marta Barnett	(United States) Lila Porter	4–6, 6–0, 6–4
1939	Orlando	(United States) Pauline Betz	(United States) Marta Barnett	12–10, 6–1
1940	Orlando	(United States) Pauline Betz (2)	(United Kingdom) Mary Hardwick	6–2, 7–9, 6–4
1941	Orlando	(United States) Sarah Palfrey Cooke	(United States) Doris Hart	6–3, 6–3
1942	Orlando	(United States) Pauline Betz (3)	(United States) Dorothy Bundy	6–1, 6–4
1946	Orlando	(United States) Shirley Fry	(United States) Eleanor P. Cushingham	6–0, 2–6, 6–3
1947	Orlando	(United States) Shirley Fry (2)	(United States) Doris Hart	6–4, 6–3
1948	Orlando	(United States) Shirley Fry (3)	(Romania) Magda Rurac	6–3, 6–3
1949	Orlando	(United States) Shirley Fry (4)	(United States) Jean Clarke	6–1, 8–6
1950	Orlando	(United States) Doris Jensen	(United States) Laura Lou Jahn	7–5, 7–9, 7–5
1952	Orlando	(United States) Karol Fageros	(United States) Pat Stewart	6–3, 2–6, 6–4
1954	Orlando	(United States) Laura Lou Kunnen	(United States) Connie Clifton Ball	6–3, 4–6, 6–3
1955	Winter Park	(United States) Karol Fageros (2)	(United States) Connie Clifton Ball	6–3, 9–7
1956	Winter Park	(Denmark) Ann Bagge	(United States) Nancy Corse	6–2, 6–2
1958	Orlando	(Brazil) Maria Bueno	(United States) Janet Hopps	6–4, 6–3
1959	Orlando	(Australia) Marie Martin	(United States) Laura Lou Kunnen	6–2, 6–2
1960	Winter Park	(United States) Carol Ann Prosen	(United States) Owen McHaney	6–2, 6–3
1961	Orlando	(United States) Carol Ann Prosen (2)	(United States) Belmar Gunderson	6–2, 6–3
1962	Orlando	(United States) Judy Alvarez	(United States) Stephanie DeFina	5–7, 6–1, 7–5
1963	Winter Park	(United States) Stephanie DeFina	(United States) Connie Clifton Ball	6–3, 6–3
1964	Winter Park	(Mexico) Elena Subirats	(United States) Connie Clifton Ball	6–3, 6–3
1965	Orlando	(Netherlands) Trudy Groenman	(United States) Nancy Corse Reed	6–3, 6–0
1966	Orlando	(United States) Alice Tym	(United States) Nancy Corse Reed	6–8, 7–5, 6–3
1967	Orlando	(Brazil) Vera Cleto	(United States) Betty Rosenquest Pratt	4–6, 7–5, 6–4
↓ Open era ↓
Florida State Open Championships
1968	Orlando	(Japan) Kazuko Sawamatsu	(Brazil) Vera Cleto	6–1, 6–2
1970	Orlando	(United States) Stephanie DeFina (3)	(United States) Mona Schallau	6–2, 6–1

== Tournament records ==
=== Men's singles ===
Included:

- Most Titles: (United States) Frank Hunter (3)
- Most Finals: (United States) Tony Vincent (4)
- Most Consecutive Titles: (United States) Frank Hunter & (United States) J. Gilbert Hall (2)
- Most Consecutive Finals: (United States) Tony Vincent (3)

=== Women's singles ===
- Most Titles: (United States) Shirley Fry (4)
- Most Finals: (United States) Teresa Schwab Wood (5)
- Most Consecutive Titles: (United States) Shirley Fry (4)
- Most Consecutive Finals: (United States) Shirley Fry (4)
