= City of Miami Championships =

Defunct tennis tournament
- Tour: ILTF World Circuit (1937–1969) men (1937–1972) women ILTF Independent Circuit (1970–76) men ILTF Independent Circuit (1973–76) women
- Founded: 1917; 108 years ago
- Abolished: 1976; 49 years ago
- Location: Miami, United States
- Venue: Henderson Park Tennis Club
- Surface: Clay / outdoor

The City of Miami Championships was a men's and women's clay court tennis tournament founded in 1917 as the Miami City Tennis Championships. The tournament was first played at the Henderson Park Tennis Club, Miami, Florida, United States. Also known as the City of Miami Invitation Championships or simply the City of Miami Invitation the tournament ran until 1976 when it was discontinued. The tournament was part of the Caribbean Circuit, a regional sub circuit of the ILTF World Circuit.

== Finals ==
=== Men's singles ===
(incomplete roll)

Year	Winners	Runners-up	Score
↓ USNLTA Circuit ↓
1917	(United States) Craig Biddle	(United States) Fred H. Harris	6–4, 6–4, 6–1.
1918	(United States) Fred H. Harris	(United States) Ralph E. Racey	6–2, 6–2, 6–3.
↓ ILTF World Circuit ↓
1936	(United States) Julius Seligson	(Cuba) Gustavo Vollmer	3–6, 6–3, 6–3.
1937	(United States) Don Budge	(United States) Bryan Grant Sr.	6–3, 2–6, 6–4, 6–4.
1938	(United States) Bobby Riggs	(United States) Frank Kovacs	3–6, 6–3, 6–4, 6–2.
1940	(United States) Bobby Riggs (2)	(United States) Gardnar Mulloy	6–0, 7–5, 6–2.
1943	(Ecuador) Pancho Segura	(United States) William Gillespie	6–0, 7–5, 6–2.
1944	(United States) Harris Everett	(United States) Herbert Behrens	6–4, 7–5, 6–1.
1945	(United States) Robert Stubbs	(United States) Frank Kovacs	3–6, 6–3, 6–4, 6–2.
1951	(United States) Bill Tully	(United States) Charles King Jr.	6–0, 6–2.
1953	(United States) Ed Rubinoff	(United States) Michael Green	6–2, 6–4.
1954	(United States) Gardnar Mulloy	(United States) Art Larsen	6–2, 5–7, 6–4.
1957	(United States) Dave Harum	(Brazil) Carlos Fernandes	6–4, 3–6, 6–0, 6–2.
1958	(United States) Budge Patty	(United States) Gardnar Mulloy	6–4, 6–2, 6–4.
1959	(United States) Ed Rubinoff (2)	(United States) John Skogstead	7–5, 0–2, ret.
1960	(United States) Don Kierbow	(Brazil) José Edison Mandarino	7–9, 6–4 9–7, 6–2.
1961	(United States) Gardnar Mulloy (2)	(Ecuador) Miguel Olvera	3–6, 4–6, 6–3, 6–3, 6–2.
1962	(United States) Gardnar Mulloy (3)	(United States) John Joseph Karabasz	3–6, 4–6, 6–3, 6–3, 6–2.
1963	(United States) Ed Rubinoff (3)	(United States) Gardnar Mulloy	10–8, 3–6, 6–1, 6–4.
1964	(Brazil) Thomaz Koch	(Ecuador) Eduardo Zuleta	6–3, 5–7, 6–1, 7–5.
1965	(Greece) Nicholas Kalogeropoulos	(United States) Billy Higgins	6–4, 6–1, 4–6, 3–6, 6–3.
1966	(Ecuador) Eduardo Zuleta	(Canada) Harry Fauquier	6–4, 6–1, 6–1.
1967	(Greece) Nicholas Kalogeropoulos (2)	(Canada) Frank Tutvin	6–1, 9–7.
1968	(Chile) Jaime Fillol	(Ecuador) Pancho Guzmán	6–8, 4–6, 10–8, 6–1, 4–1, retd.
↓ Open era ↓
1969	(Chile) Jaime Fillol (2)	(Ecuador) Pancho Guzmán	13–11, 5–7, 9–7.
↓ ILTF Independent Circuit ↓
1970	(Chile) Jaime Fillol (3)	(South Africa) Pat Cramer	1–6, 6–3, 6–4.
1971	(United States) Eddie Dibbs	(United States) Dan Bleckinger	6–1, 6–4.
1972	(United States) Mike Estep	(United States) Raz Reid	1–6, 6–3, 6–4.
1973	(South Africa) Bernie Mitton	(Sweden) Björn Borg	6–2, 6–2.
1974	(United States) Fred McNair	(United States) Gery Groslimond	6–3, 6–1.
1976	(Canada) Greg Halder	(United States) Jim Breech	6–4, 7–6.

=== Women's singles ===
(incomplete roll)

Year	Winners	Runners-up	Score
↓ ILTF World Circuit ↓
1922	(United States) Clare Cassell	(Cuba) Gisela Comallonga	6–4, 6–2
1940	(United Kingdom) Mary Hardwick	(United States) Pauline Betz	6–2, 2–6, 6–1
1946	(United States) Betty Hulbert	(United States) Eleanor Purdy Cushingham	6–2, 6–0
1948	(United States) Shirley Fry	(United States) Dorothy Bundy	9–7, 6–1
1952	(Romania) Magda Rurac	(United States) Betty Hulbert James	6–1, 2–6, 6–1
1953	(Australia) Thelma Coyne Long	(United States) Joan Merciadis	6–1, 2–6, 6–1
1954	(United States) Doris Hart	(Mexico) Marta Hernandez	6–4, 6–4
1955	(United States) Doris Hart (2)	(United States) Joan Merciadis	6–2, 6–2
1957	(Mexico) Marta Hernandez	(United States) Marilyn Stock	6–2, 4–6, 6–4
1958	(United States) Karol Fageros	(United States) Barbara Scofield Davidson	6–2, 7–5
1959	(Australia) Marie Martin	(United States) Barbara Scofield Davidson	6–3, 6–1
1960	(United States) Marilyn Stock	(United States) Margaret Demogenes	0–6, 6–4, 6–4
1961	(Brazil) Mary Habicht	(Canada) Ann Barclay	2–6, 6–1, 6–3
1962	(Australia) Margaret Hellyer	(United States) Stephanie DeFina	6–3, 6–1
1963	(United States) Stephanie DeFina	(United States) Carol-Ann Prosen	6–3, 6–3
1964	(United States) Stephanie DeFina (2)	(United States) Margarita Bender	6–1, 6–4
1965	(Netherlands) Betty Stöve	(Netherlands) Trudy Groenman	6–3, 6–2
1966	(United States) Stephanie DeFina (3)	(United States) Nancy Corse Reed	2–6, 6–4, 6–3
1967	(United States) Alice Tym	(Mexico) Elena Subirats	6–3, 8–6
1968	(Canada) Faye Urban	(Brazil) Vera Cleto	6–2, 6–0
↓ Open era ↓
1969	(United States) Stephanie DeFina (4)	(Brazil) Suzana Petersen	6–1, 6–2
1972	(United States) Pam Austin	(Argentina) Anna Maria Cavadini	8–6, 6–2
