= South Florida Open Championships =

Defunct tennis tournament
- Tour: ILTF World Circuit (1922–72); ILTF Independent Tour (1973–77)
- Founded: 1922; 104 years ago
- Abolished: 1977; 49 years ago
- Location: Fort Lauderdale; Miami; Miami Beach; Punta Gorda; Palm Beach; West Palm Beach
- Venue: Various
- Surface: Clay

The South Florida Open Championships also known as the South Florida Championships or South Florida Open was an international men's and women's clay court tennis tournament founded in 1922. The tournament was first played in Miami, Florida, United States. From 1946 this tournament also carried the joint denomination of West Palm Beach Open. The tournament was played at other locations until 1977 when it was discontinued as part of the ILTF Independent Tour.

== History ==
The South Florida Championships was a combined men's and women's clay court tournament first established in February 1922 and played in Miami, Florida, United States. The inaugural singles winners were Fritz Bastian (men's) and Martha Floyd (women's). The tournament was part regional USLTA Southern Circuit. In 1954 a second edition of the men's event was held in Fort Lauderdale called the South Florida Fall Championships that was won by

The tournament was held in Miami, Miami Beach, Palm Beach Punta Gorda, West Palm Beach. The fall championships were played in Fort Lauderdale.

The championships ran annually until 1977 when they discontinued from the ILTF Independent Tour, a series of worldwide tournaments not part of the men's Grand Prix Circuit or women's the WTA Tour. The final winners of the singles events were the Canadian player Harry Fritz (men's), the American player Bunny Smith (women's)

== Finals ==
=== Men's singles (Winter) ===
(incomplete roll)

Year	Location	Champions	Runners-up	Score
South Florida Championships
1922	Miami	(United States) Fritz Bastian	(New Zealand) James Calder	6-2, 6–3, 6–3.
1924	Miami	(United States) G. Carlton Shafer	(United States) George Bart Pfingst	8-6, 6–4, 6–1.
1926	West Palm Beach	(United States) Jerome (Jerry) Lang	(United States) John T. Graves jr.	6-1, 8–6, 6–3.
1927	West Palm Beach	(United States) Bill Tilden II	(Spain) Manuel Alonso Areizaga	6-3, 7–9, 5–7, 6–4, 6–2.
1928	Miami Beach	(United States) Frank Hunter	(United States) John F. Hennessey	6-4, 6–4, 6–3.
1929	Miami	(United States) John F. Hennessey	(United States) Frank Hunter	2-6, 3–6, 6–4, 6–2, 6–3.
1930	Miami	(United States) George Lott	(United States) John Doeg	2-6, 6–2, 4–6, 6–2, 8–6.
1931	Punta Gorda	(United States) J. Gilbert Hall	(Cuba) Gustavo Vollmer	7-5, 4–6, 6–3, 7–5.
1932	Punta Gorda	(United States) Julius Seligson	(Cuba) Gustavo Vollmer	4-6, 6–2, 6–3, 6–1.
1939	West Palm Beach	(United States) Wayne Sabin	(United States) Gene Mako	7-9, 6–1, 4–6, 6–3, 6–2.
1940	West Palm Beach	(United States) Bobby Riggs	(United States) Henry Prusoff	6-1, 7–5, 6–2.
1941	Palm Beach	(United States) Bobby Riggs (2)	(United States) Jack Kramer	6-3, 6–2, 6–3.
1946	West Palm Beach	(United States) Gardnar Mulloy	(Ecuador) Pancho Segura	6–4, 6–3.
1948	West Palm Beach	(United States) Bruce Thomas	(United States) Sidney Schwartz	6-4, 6–4.
1950	West Palm Beach	(United States) Tony Vincent	(United States) Malcolm Fox	7-5, 6–3.
1951	West Palm Beach	(United States) Louis Straight Clark	(United States) Tony Vincent	6-4, 6–1, 5–7, 6–3.
1952	West Palm Beach	(United States) Gardnar Mulloy (2)	(United States) Tony Vincent	6-4, 4–6, 7–5, 6–3.
1953	West Palm Beach	(United States) Malcolm Fox	(United States) Charles Harris	1-6, 6–2, 10–8.
1954	West Palm Beach	(United States) Gardnar Mulloy (3)	(Canada) Lorne Main	6-1, 4–6, 6–2, 2–6, 6–2.
1955	West Palm Beach	(United States) Eddie Moylan	(France) Jean-Noël Grinda	9-7, 6–2.
1956	West Palm Beach	(United States) Vic Seixas	(United States) Eddie Moylan	2-6, 6–2, 6–4.
1957	West Palm Beach	(Australia) Don Candy	(Brazil) Armando Vieira	3-6, 6–4, 6–3, 6–1.
1958	West Palm Beach	(United States) Jack Frost	(Japan) Kosei Kamo	6-3, 6–2.
1959	West Palm Beach	(United States) Jack Frost (2)	(United States) John W. Frost	6-2, 6–2.
1960	West Palm Beach	(United Kingdom) Mike Davies	(Ecuador) Eduardo Zuleta	6-2, 6–0.
1961	West Palm Beach	(United States) John C. Skogstad	(Ecuador) Eduardo Zuleta	6-0, 6–0, 2–6, 2–6, 6–3.
1962	West Palm Beach	(United States) Ed Rubinoff	(Brazil) Thomaz Koch	8-6, 10–12, 9–7, 7–5.
1963	West Palm Beach	(Ecuador) Miguel Olvera	(Ecuador) Eduardo Zuleta	6-1, 6–3, 6–1.
1964	West Palm Beach	(Greece) Nicky Kalogeropoulos	(Ecuador) Eduardo Zuleta	7-5, 6–1, 3–6, 6–3.
1965	West Palm Beach	(United States) Billy Higgins	(United States) Lester M Sack	6-3, 6–1, 6–0.
1966	West Palm Beach	(Ecuador) Eduardo Zuleta	(Canada) Harry Fauquier	6-3, 6–1.
1967	West Palm Beach	(Ecuador) Eduardo Zuleta (2)	(Canada) Keith Carpenter	10-8, 6–2.
1968	West Palm Beach	(Ecuador) Eduardo Zuleta (3)	(Canada) Frank Tutvin	6-4, 6–3.
↓ Open era ↓
South Florida Open Championships
1969	West Palm Beach	(Ecuador) Eduardo Zuleta (4)	(United States) Jamie Pressly	8-6, 6–0.
South Florida Open
1970	West Palm Beach	(United States) Frank Froehling III	(Ecuador) Pancho Guzmán	7-5, 5–7, 6–3.
1971	West Palm Beach	(United States) Frank Froehling III (2)	(South Africa) Pat Cramer	6-3, 6–2.
1972	West Palm Beach	(United States) Eddie Dibbs	(Ecuador) Miguel Olvera	5-7, 6–4, 7–5.
1973	West Palm Beach	(United States) Eddie Dibbs (2)	(United States) Norman Holmes	6-0, 6–2.
1974	West Palm Beach	(United States) Doug Crawford	(United States) Rick Fisher	6-3, 7–5.
1976	West Palm Beach	(Canada) Greg Halder	(France) Clive Rothwell	6-2, 6–3.
1977	West Palm Beach	(Canada) Harry Fritz	(United States) Larry Loeb	6-4, 7–6.

=== Men's singles (Fall) ===
Year	Location	Champions	Runners-up	Score
South Florida Fall Championships/West Palm Beach Fall Open
1954	Fort Lauderdale	(United States) Allen Austin Quay	(United States) James (Jim) Shakespeare	6-2, 6–2.

=== Women's singles ===
(incomplete roll)

Year	Location	Champions	Runners-up	Score
South Florida Championships
1922	Miami	(United States) Martha Floyd	(United States) Clare Cassell	6-4, 6-4
1923	Miami	(United States) Anna Townsend Godfrey	(United States) Clare Cassell	6-1, 6-1
1929	Miami	(United States) Eleanor Brooks Cottman	(Cuba) Gisela Comallonga	6-,2 6-4
1939	West Palm Beach	(United States) Pauline Betz	(United States) Marta Barnett	6-3, 6-2
1940	West Palm Beach	(United Kingdom) Mary Hardwick	(United States) Sarah Palfrey Fabyan	6-1, 6-3
1941	Palm Beach	(United States) Pauline Betz (2)	(United States) Dorothy Bundy	6-4, 6-1
1946	West Palm Beach	(United States) Shirley Fry	(United States) Eleanor Cushingham	6-2, 2-6 6-1
1948	West Palm Beach	(Romania) Magda Berescu Rurac	(United States) Laura Lou Jahn	6-4, 6-1
1949	West Palm Beach	(United States) Helen Pedersen Rihbany	(United States) Virginia Lee Boyer	6-0, 6-1
1950	West Palm Beach	(United States) Jean Clarke	(United States) Rhoda Hopkins	7-5, 6–8, 6-1
1951	West Palm Beach	(United States) Beverly Baker	(United States) Shirley Fry	6-4, 6-4
1953	West Palm Beach	(Australia) Thelma Coyne Long	(United States) Jean Clarke	6-4, 6-4
1954	West Palm Beach	(United States) Laura Lou Kunnen	(Canada) Hana Sládková-Koželuhová	9-7, 6-1
1955	West Palm Beach	(United States) Mildred Thornton	(United States) Pat Stewart	9-7, 6-4
1956	West Palm Beach	(United States) Shirley Fry (2)	(United States) Nancy Morrison Montgomery	6–1, 6-1
1957	West Palm Beach	(United States) Dottie Head Knode	(United States) Karol Fageros	7–9, 7–5, 6-3
1958	West Palm Beach	(United States) Janet Hopps	(Brazil) Maria Bueno	6–3, 7-5
1959	West Palm Beach	(United States) Barbara Scofield Davidson	(Australia) Marie Martin	6–4, 2–6, 9-7
1960	West Palm Beach	(Canada) Ann Barclay	(United States) Sandy Warshaw	7–5, 6-1
1961	West Palm Beach	(Canada) Ann Barclay (2)	(United States) Nancy Morrison Montgomery	6–1, 6-3
1962	West Palm Beach	(United States) Stephanie DeFina	(United States) Nancy Morrison Montgomery	8–6, 6-2
1963	West Palm Beach	(United States) Stephanie DeFina (2)	(United States) Nancy Morrison Orthwein	6–1, 6-1
1964	West Palm Beach	(United States) Stephanie DeFina (3)	(United States) Carol Ann Prosen	1–6, 6–4, 6-2
1965	West Palm Beach	(Netherlands) Betty Stöve	(Netherlands) Trudy Groenman	6–4, 6-4
1966	West Palm Beach	(United States) Stephanie DeFina (4)	(United States) Alice Tym	6–4, 6-0
1967	West Palm Beach	(United States) Stephanie DeFina (5)	(Brazil) Vera Cleto	6–3, 6-0
1968	West Palm Beach	(Japan) Kazuko Sawamatsu	(Brazil) Vera Cleto	6–1, 6-3
↓ Open era ↓
South Florida Open Championships
1969	West Palm Beach	(United States) Stephanie DeFina (6)	(Argentina) Anna Maria Cavadini	6–1, 6-2
South Florida Open
1970	West Palm Beach	(United States) Chris Evert	(United States) Stephanie DeFina	6–3, 6-2
1971	West Palm Beach	(France) Christiane Spinoza	(United States) Bunny Smith	6–1, 6-2
1972	West Palm Beach	(United States) Pam Austin	(United States) Mary McLean	6–1, 6-1
1973	West Palm Beach	(United States) Bunny Smith	(Austria) Sabine Bernegger	6–4, 7-5

== Tournament records ==
=== Men's singles ===
Included:

- Most Titles: (Ecuador) Eduardo Zuleta (4)
- Most Finals: (Ecuador) Eduardo Zuleta (8)
- Most Consecutive Titles: (Ecuador) Eduardo Zuleta (3)
- Most Consecutive Finals: (Ecuador) Eduardo Zuleta (3)

=== Women's singles ===
- Most Titles: (United States) Stephanie DeFina (6)
- Most Finals: (United States) Stephanie DeFina (7)
- Most Consecutive Titles: (United States) Stephanie DeFina (3)
- Most Consecutive Finals: (United States) Stephanie DeFina (3)
