= 1962 U.S. National Championships – Men's singles =

Men's singles
- 1962 U.S. National Championships

Final
- Champion: (Australia) Rod Laver
- Runner-up: (Australia) Roy Emerson
- Score: 6–2, 6–4, 5–7, 6–4

Details
- Draw: 128
- Seeds: 8

Events
Singles	men	women
Doubles	men	women
- U.S. National Championships

Rod Laver defeated Roy Emerson 6–2, 6–4, 5–7, 6–4 in the final to win the men's singles tennis title at the 1962 U.S. National Championships, and in turn complete a Grand Slam by winning all four majors in the same year. Laver would not appear in a Grand Slam tournament again until the start of the Open Era in 1968, due to turning professional in 1963.

== Seeds ==
The seeded players are listed below. Rod Laver is the champion; others show the round in which they were eliminated.

1. (Australia) Rod Laver (champion)
2. (Australia) Roy Emerson (finalist)
3. (United States) Chuck McKinley (semifinals)
4. (Mexico) Rafael Osuna (semifinals)
5. (Australia) Fred Stolle (second round)
6. (Sweden) Jan-Erik Lundqvist (third round)
7. (Italy) Nicola Pietrangeli (first round)
8. (United States) Frank Froehling (quarterfinals)

== Draw ==
=== Key ===
- Q = Qualifier
- WC = Wild card
- LL = Lucky loser
- r = Retired

=== Finals ===
Quarterfinals
1	(Australia) Rod Laver	6	13	4	6
8	(United States) Frank Froehling	3	11	6	3
4	(Mexico) Rafael Osuna	6	6	7
(South Africa) Gordon Forbes	4	4	5
2	(Australia) Roy Emerson	6	6	6
(United States) Andrew Lloyd	1	1	3
3	(United States) Chuck McKinley	6	6	6	6
(United States) Ham Richardson	2	2	8	4

Semifinals
1	(Australia) Rod Laver	6	6	6
4	(Mexico) Rafael Osuna	1	3	4
2	(Australia) Roy Emerson	4	6	6	6
3	(United States) Chuck McKinley	6	4	3	2

Final
1	(Australia) Rod Laver	6	6	5	6
2	(Australia) Roy Emerson	2	4	7	4

=== Earlier rounds ===
==== Section 1 ====
First round
1	(Australia) Laver	6	6	6
(Israel) Davidman	3	2	3
(Ecuador) Zuleta	6	6	6
(United States) Cooper	2	0	2
(United States) Newman	6	6	6
(Sweden) Hallberg	0	4	4
(West Germany) Nitsche	6	6	6
(Canada) Carpenter	3	1	1
(United States) Dell	6	6	6
(United States) Parker	1	2	2
(United States) Scott	6	7	6	8
(United States) Schwartz	2	9	1	6
(Soviet Union) Leius	6	6	7
(Netherlands) Schneider	1	4	5
(Mexico) Palafox	7	4	6	6
(United States) Bond	5	6	4	2

Second round
1	(Australia) Laver	6	6	6
(Ecuador) Zuleta	3	3	1
(United States) Newman	6	3	3	1
(West Germany) Nitsche	2	6	6	6
(United States) Dell	5	7	6	6
(United States) Scott	7	5	3	2
(Soviet Union) Leius	3	3	6	3
(Mexico) Palafox	6	6	3	6

Third round
1	(Australia) Laver	9	6	6
(West Germany) Nitsche	7	1	1
(United States) Dell	4	7	7
(Mexico) Palafox	6	9	9

Fourth round
1	(Australia) Laver	6	6	6
(Mexico) Palafox	1	2	2

==== Section 2 ====
First round
8	(United States) Froehling	6	5	6	3	6
(United States) Nagler	1	7	2	6	2
(United States) Wright	6	5	2	10	11
(Mexico) Donnadieu	3	7	6	8	9
(South Africa) Drysdale	6	3	7	6
(United States) Steele III	1	6	5	3
(Canada) Fontana	3	6	6	6
(Lebanon) Fawaz	6	4	2	2
(United States) Cromwell	8	16	6
(United States) Fentress	6	14	1
(United States) Perry	2	6	6	6
(Israel) Asz	6	1	2	2
(Ecuador) Olvera	6	6	4	6
(United States) Fox	4	3	6	3
(United States) Holmberg	6	6	6
(Netherlands) Hajer	1	4	2

Second round
8	(United States) Froehling	8	6	17
(United States) Wright	6	2	15
(South Africa) Drysdale	6	6	7
(Canada) Fontana	4	2	5
(United States) Cromwell	5	1	8	6	4
(United States) Perry	7	6	6	4	6
(Ecuador) Olvera	1	6	2	0
(United States) Holmberg	6	3	6	6

Third round
8	(United States) Froehling	6	6	6
(South Africa) Drysdale	0	4	3
(United States) Perry	1	5	2
(United States) Holmberg	6	7	6

Fourth round
8	(United States) Froehling	8	7	6	6
(United States) Holmberg	10	5	4	3

==== Section 3 ====
First round
4	(Mexico) Osuna	6	6	10
(United States) Werksman	2	4	8
(Sweden) Schmidt	6	6	6
(Republic of Ireland) Hackett	2	2	0
(United States) Reed	4	6	10	2	6
(United States) Ralston	6	2	8	6	3
(United States) Buchholz	8	6	6
(United States) Cullen	6	4	2
(India) Mukerjea	6	6	1	6
(United States) Rubinoff	1	0	6	4
(United States) Hernando	2	7	6	6
(United States) Como	6	5	3	3
(Poland) Gasiorek	6	3	7	7	6
(United States) Drilling	2	6	5	9	3
(United States) Pasarell	10	6	4	6	8
(United States) Fisher	12	4	6	2	6

Second round
4	(Mexico) Osuna	8	6	4	6	6
(Sweden) Schmidt	10	3	6	3	2
(United States) Reed	6	6	7
(United States) Buchholz	3	0	5
(India) Mukerjea	6	3	6	8
(United States) Hernando	0	6	3	6
(Poland) Gasiorek	1	1	6
(United States) Pasarell	6	6	8

Third round
4	(Mexico) Osuna	11	6	3	3	10
(United States) Reed	9	4	6	6	8
(India) Mukerjea	3	7	5	6	6
(United States) Pasarell	6	5	7	3	1

Fourth round
4	(Mexico) Osuna	6	6	5	6
(India) Mukerjea	2	2	7	4

==== Section 4 ====
First round
5	(Australia) Stolle	6	6	6
(Norway) Jagge	4	2	0
(South Africa) Forbes	9	3	7	6	6
(Socialist Federal Republic of Yugoslavia) Pilić	7	6	9	3	3
(Denmark) Ulrich	4	6	6	6
(United States) Beste	6	3	3	3
(Soviet Union) Metreveli	6	6	5	7	6
(United States) Brown	3	3	7	5	0
(United Kingdom) Knight	6	6	6
(Austria) Hainka	2	4	1
(Tunisia) Belkhodjia	8	6	6
(United States) Graebner	6	1	4
(United States) Fitzgibbon	6	6	6
(Federation of Rhodesia and Nyasaland) Kileff	3	0	3
(West Germany) Ecklebe	6	6	8
(United States) Goldman	3	0	6

Second round
5	(Australia) Stolle	1	6	9
(South Africa) Forbes	6	8	11
(Denmark) Ulrich	6	6	4	7	6
(Soviet Union) Metreveli	4	2	6	9	8
(United Kingdom) Knight	6	6	6
(Tunisia) Belkhodjia	0	2	1
(United States) Fitzgibbon	6	7	7
(West Germany) Ecklebe	1	5	5

Third round
(South Africa) Forbes	3	10	6	7
(Soviet Union) Metreveli	6	8	4	5
(United Kingdom) Knight	4	6	6	10
(United States) Fitzgibbon	6	1	4	8

Fourth round
(South Africa) Forbes	4	5	6	11	6
(United Kingdom) Knight	6	7	4	9	4

==== Section 5 ====
First round
2	(Australia) Emerson	6	6	7
(Mexico) Contreras	1	3	5
(United States) Ashe	6	6	6
(United States) Newman	4	4	2
(United States) Neely	3	7	6	10	6
(United States) Clark	6	9	4	8	4
(United States) Riessen	6	8	6
(Belgium) Drossart	2	6	3
(United Kingdom) Sangster	6	7	6
(United States) Karabasz	1	5	3
(United States) Lenoir	6	4	6	6
(Socialist Federal Republic of Yugoslavia) Jovanović	1	6	3	0
(Czechoslovakia) Javorský	6	6	6
(Canada) Fauquier	3	3	1
(South Africa) Mandelstam	6	6	5	7
(United States) Hoogs	1	3	7	5

Second round
2	(Australia) Emerson	6	6	6
(United States) Ashe	2	3	0
(United States) Neely	6	4	5	2	1
(United States) Riessen	4	6	7	6	6
(United Kingdom) Sangster	6	6	6
(United States) Lenoir	4	3	4
(Czechoslovakia) Javorský	3	1	6	3
(South Africa) Mandelstam	6	6	4	6

Third round
2	(Australia) Emerson	6	11	6
(United States) Riessen	2	9	3
(United Kingdom) Sangster	6	7	8
(South Africa) Mandelstam	3	5	6

Fourth round
2	(Australia) Emerson	4	6	6	9	6
(United Kingdom) Sangster	6	3	4	11	1

==== Section 6 ====
First round
(United States) Hoffman Jr
7	(Italy) Pietrangeli	w/o
(United States) Lloyd	3	4	6	6	7
(United States) Higgins	6	6	3	2	5
(United States) Edlefsen	8	6	6
(Socialist Federal Republic of Yugoslavia) Presecki	6	2	1
(United States) Farrin	6	6	9	5	6
(Canada) Belkin	3	2	11	7	4
(France) Renavand	8	6	6
(United States) Gottlieb	6	2	0
(United States) Roberts	6	4	6	6
(United States) Reese	4	6	2	1
(United States) Earnhart	6	6	6
(United States) Sokol	4	4	2
(Finland) Nyyssönen	8	7	6
(United States) Welles	6	5	4

Second round
(United States) Hoffman Jr	6	6	3	6	3
(United States) Lloyd	4	1	6	8	6
(United States) Edlefsen	6	6	6	6
(United States) Farrin	8	2	2	2
(France) Renavand	6	6	5	6
(United States) Roberts	3	2	7	1
(United States) Earnhart	1	4	3
(Finland) Nyyssönen	6	6	6

Third round
(United States) Lloyd	6	6	6
(United States) Edlefsen	4	1	0
(France) Renavand	2	4	1
(Finland) Nyyssönen	6	6	6

Fourth round
(United States) Lloyd	9	6	6
(Finland) Nyyssönen	7	3	4

==== Section 7 ====
First round
3	(United States) McKinley	6	6	6
(United States) Bowditch	2	1	1
(France) Licis	6	6	6
(United States) Schnaars	3	2	4
(United States) Snyder	6	6	6
(United States) Botts	1	1	1
(Poland) Skonecki	6	6	5	6
(United States) Driscole	3	4	7	4
(Denmark) Leschly	2	6	9	7
(Brazil) Mandarino	6	3	7	5
(United States) Watson	6	6	3	6
(New Zealand) McDonald	2	2	6	1
(United States) Reed	6	6	6
(South Africa) Maloney	3	1	4
(United States) Henry	10	6	6
(United States) Siska	8	3	4

Second round
3	(United States) McKinley	6	6	6
(France) Licis	4	3	1
(United States) Snyder	5	6	4	2
(Poland) Skonecki	7	4	6	6
(Denmark) Leschly	6	6	6
(United States) Watson	2	1	4
(United States) Reed	5	12	9	4
(United States) Henry	7	10	11	6

Third round
3	(United States) McKinley	6	6	6
(Poland) Skonecki	4	4	1
(Denmark) Leschly	6	6	6
(United States) Henry	4	4	0

Fourth round
3	(United States) McKinley	6	6	7
(Denmark) Leschly	0	3	5

==== Section 8 ====
First round
6	(Sweden) Lundqvist	6	6	6
(Republic of Ireland) Jackson	1	3	3
(Australia) Sharpe	3	7	6	8
(United States) Senkowski	6	5	3	6
(United States) Shaffer	2	4	6	6	10
(United States) Sorlien	6	6	1	3	8
(United States) Seixas	6	2	6	6
(United States) Greer	1	6	0	4
(West Germany) Bungert	6	0	6	7
(United States) Powless	4	6	3	5
(United States) McManus	4	16	12	6	6
(Soviet Union) Likhachev	6	18	10	1	4
(United States) Richardson	6	6	4	3	6
(Canada) Godbout	3	3	6	6	3
(France) Pilet	6	6	6
(United States) Tully	4	4	3

Second round
6	(Sweden) Lundqvist	9	5	0	7	6
(Australia) Sharpe	7	7	6	5	2
(United States) Shaffer	7	4	2
(United States) Seixas	9	6	6
(West Germany) Bungert	6	6	6
(United States) McManus	4	2	2
(United States) Richardson	6	6	6
(France) Pilet	4	3	1

Third round
6	(Sweden) Lundqvist	4	3	3
(United States) Seixas	6	6	6
(West Germany) Bungert	3	7	2
(United States) Richardson	6	9	6

Fourth round
(United States) Seixas	10	5	6	1
(United States) Richardson	12	7	4	6

Preceded by 1962 Wimbledon Championships – Men's singles	Grand Slam men's singles	Succeeded by 1963 Australian Championships – Men's singles
