= Virginia Slims of Fort Lauderdale =

Defunct tennis tournament
- Event name: Austin Smith Championships (1946–68) (combined); Austin Smith Championships (1969–70) (men); WLOD Invitational (1969) (women); WLOD International (1970); Fort Lauderdale Invitation (1971); S&H Green Stamp Classic (1972–73); Virginia Slims of Fort Lauderdale (1974)
- Tour: ILTF Caribbean Circuit (1946–1970); WTA Tour (1971–74)
- Founded: 1946
- Abolished: 1974
- Editions: 28
- Location: Fort Lauderdale, Florida, U.S.
- Venue: Fort Lauderdale Tennis Club; Pompano Beach Tennis Center
- Surface: Clay (1971–74)

The Virginia Slims of Fort Lauderdale is a defunct WTA Tour affiliated women's tennis tournament founded in 1946 as a combined men's and women's event called the Austin Smith Championships that was part of the ILTF Circuit. The tournament played at the Fort Lauderdale Tennis Club from 1946 to 1974. It was held in Fort Lauderdale, Florida in the United States and played on outdoor clay courts.

== History ==
The Austin Smith Championships were a combined men's and women's clay court tournament first established in 1946. The event was always played on outdoor clay courts at Fort Lauderdale, Florida, United States. In 1969 the men's tournament continued under its original brand name, whilst the women's event was renamed as the WLOD Invitational. In 1970 the combined event was discontinued as the men's tournament was dropped from the schedule. In 1970 the women's tournament was branded as the WLOD International. In 1971 two versions of the tournament one in January the WLOD Invitational and one in February the Fort Lauderdale Invitation. In 1972 the women's tournament was renamed as the S&H Green Stamp Classic for sponsorship reasons as part of the Virginia Slims Circuit until 1973. In 1974 the last edition the tournament was just branded as the Virginia Slims of Fort Lauderdale.

== Finals ==
=== Men's singles ===
(incomplete roll)

Year	Champions	Runners-up	Score
1949	(United States) Gardnar Mulloy	(United States) Gardner Larned	2–6, 6–2, 6–3, 4–6, 9–7
1950	(United States) Gardnar Mulloy (2)	(United States) Herbert Behrens	4–6, 6–4, 5–7, 6–0, 6-3
1951	(United States) Sidney Schwartz	(United States) Donald Kaiser	6–2, 6–4, 6–1
1952	(United States) Gardnar Mulloy (3)	(United States) Sidney Schwartz	6–2, 6–1, 6–2
1953	(United States) Gardnar Mulloy (4)	(United States) Tony Vincent	6–0, 1–6, 6–1, 6–1
1954	(United States) Gardnar Mulloy (5)	(Canada) Lorne Main	6–4, 6–3, 6–0
1955	(United States) Eddie Moylan	(South Africa) Johann Kupferburger	6–2, 6–1, 6–4
1956	(United States) Jerry Moss	(United States) Allen Quay	15–13, 4–6, 3–6, 6–3, 6–4
1957	(South Africa) Reyno Summers	(United States) Pete Pressinger	4–6, 5–7, 6–2, 6–2, 6–1
1958	(United States) Gardnar Mulloy (6)	(United States) John W. Frost	1–6, 6–1, 6–1, 6–4
1959	(United States) John Powless	(Sweden) Birger Folke	8–6, 3–6, 6–3, 6–1
1960	(Australia) Don Candy	(Ecuador) Eduardo Zuleta	8–6, 9–7
1961	(United States) Gardnar Mulloy (7)	(Ecuador) Miguel Olvera	8–6, 3–6, 6–4, 6–3
1962	(United States) Gardnar Mulloy(8)	(Brazil) Carlos Fernandes	1–6, 4–6, 6–4, 6–3, 6–1
1963	(United States) Ed Rubinoff	(Brazil) Thomaz Koch	4–6, 11–3, 8–6, 7–5, 6–2
1964	(Ecuador) Eduardo Zuleta	(United States) Gardnar Mulloy	5–7, 2–6, 6–3, 6–2, 6–3
1965	(United States) Frank Froehling	(United States) Billy Higgins	6–4, 6–2, 6–1
1966	(United States) Frank Froehling (2)	(Canada) Mike Belkin	6–4, 6–1
1967	(United States) Frank Froehling (3)	(Chile) Jaime Fillol	6–3, 4–6, 6–3, 6–3
1968	(United States) Frank Froehling (4)	(Ecuador) Pancho Guzmán	1–6, 9–11, 6–2 ret.
↓ Open era ↓
1969	(South Africa) Pat Cramer	(Chile) Jaime Fillol	6–2, 11–9
1970	(United States) Cliff Richey	(United States) Clark Graebner	6–3, 7–5

=== Women's singles ===
(incomplete roll)

Year	Champions	Runners-up	Score
1946	(United States) Doris Hart	(United States) Virginia Kovacs	6–0, 6–1
1948	(Romania) Magda Rurac	(United States) Laura Lou Jahn	6–0, 6–2
1949	(United States) Helen Rihbany	(United States) Virginia Lee Boyer	6-2 6-1
1950	(United States) Laura Lou Jahn	(United States) Rhoda Hopkins Root	6–8, 6–3, 6–3
1951	(United States) Laura Lou Jahn (2)	(United States) Nancy Morrison	6–2, 4–6, 7–5
1952	(Romania) Magda Rurac (2)	(United States) Laura Lou Jahn Kunnen	6–1, 6–3
1953	(United States) Doris Hart (2)	(Ecuador) Alicia Wright	6–0, 6–2
1954	(United States) Laura Lou Jahn Kunnen (3)	(Canada) Hanna Kozeluhova Sladek	4–6, 6–3, 6–4
1955	(United States) Karol Fageros	(United States) Marilyn Stock	6–2, 6–2
1956	(United States) Marilyn Stock	(United States) Lois Miller Osten	6–0, 6–3
1957	(Brazil) Maria Bueno	(Mexico) Martha Hernández	6–2, 6–1
1958	(Brazil) Maria Bueno (2)	(United States) Janet Hopps	1–6, 6–4, 6–4
1959	(United States) Karol Fageros (2)	(Australia) Marie Martin	6–4, 6–3
1960	(Canada) Ann Barclay	(United States) Margaret Babbitt	6–1, 6–1
1961	(Brazil) Mary Habicht	(United States) Kay Hubbell	1–6, 6–4, 6–0
1962	(Australia) Margaret Hellyer	(United States) Stephanie DeFina	6–4, 6–3
1963	(United States) Stephanie DeFina	(United States) Carol Hanks	6–2, 5–7, 10–8
1964	(United States) Stephanie DeFina (2)	(United States) Frances Farrar	6–3, 6–0
1965	(Netherlands) Trudy Groenman	(Netherlands) Ellie Krocke	6–4, 6–3
1966	(United States) Stephanie DeFina (3)	(United States) Peachy Kellmeyer	5–7, 7–5, 6–2
1967	(United States) Stephanie DeFina (4)	(United States) Peachy Kellmeyer	6–2, 6–1
1968	(Canada) Faye Urban	(United States) Alice Tym	6–2, 6–1
↓ Open era ↓
1969	(United States) Julie Heldman	(United Kingdom) Virginia Wade	6–1, 6–4
1970	(United States) Nancy Richey	(United States) Peaches Bartkowicz	6–3, 6–0
1971	(France) Françoise Dürr	(United States) Billie Jean King	6–3, 3–6, 6–3
1972	(United States) Chris Evert	(United States) Billie Jean King	6–1, 6–0
1973	(United States) Chris Evert (2)	(United Kingdom) Virginia Wade	6–1, 6–2
1974	(United States) Chris Evert (3)	(Australia) Kerry Reid	Walkover

=== Women's doubles ===
Year	Champions	Runners-up	Score
1972	(Australia) Judy Tegart (France) Françoise Dürr	(United States) Nancy Richey (United Kingdom) Virginia Wade	6–3, 6–2
1973	(France) Gail Sherriff (United Kingdom) Virginia Wade	(Australia) Evonne Goolagong (Australia) Janet Young	4–6, 6–3, 6–2
1974	(France) Françoise Dürr (Netherlands) Betty Stöve	(United States) Patti Hogan (United States) Sharon Walsh	6–3, 6–2

== Event names ==
- Austin Smith Championships (1946–1968) (Combined men's & women's event)
- Austin Smith Championships (1969–1970) (men's event)
- WLOD Invitational (1969–1971) (women's event)
- Fort Lauderdale Invitation (1971 women's event 2nd meeting)
- S&H Green Stamp Classic (1972–1973)
- Virginia Slims of Fort Lauderdale (1974)

== See also ==
- 1973 Virginia Slims of Fort Lauderdale
