= Andrew Lloyd =

Andy or Andrew Lloyd may refer to:

- Andy Lloyd (cricketer) (born 1956), English cricketer for Warwickshire
- Andy Lloyd (rugby union) (born 1981), Welsh international rugby union player
- Andrew Lloyd (runner) (born 1959), English-born Australian runner and 1990 Commonwealth Champion
- Andy Lloyd (tennis), American tennis player in 1960s
- Andrew Lloyd (MP), member for Shropshire (UK Parliament constituency) in 1658-59

== See also ==
- Andrew Lloyd Webber (born 1948), British composer and impresario
