= Harry Fritz (tennis) =

Canadian-American tennis player (1951–2025)

- Country (sports): United States; Canada
- Born: February 19, 1951; Yuma, Arizona, U.S.
- Died: May 2, 2025 (aged 74); Palm Springs, California, U.S.
- Turned pro: 1971
- Retired: 1984
- Plays: Left-handed

Singles
- Career record: 91–110
- Career titles: 1

Grand Slam singles results
- US Open: 1R (1980)

Doubles
- Career record: 4–19

Grand Slam doubles results
- Australian Open: 1R (1978)
- Wimbledon: 1R (1973)
- US Open: 2R (1981)

Harry Fritz (February 19, 1951 – May 2, 2025) was an American-Canadian professional tennis player.

== Tennis career ==
Fritz played his first tournament in 1971 at the Real Madrid International in Madrid, Spain, where he lost to Lew Hoad in the second round. A left-handed player, Fritz was born in Yuma, Arizona, and played collegiate tennis for East Texas State. He was a member of the university's 1972 NAIA championship team, in a year he also won the singles and doubles individual titles. He was a semi-finalist at the Ankara International in Ankara, Turkey, in 1974 losing to Denmark's Lars Elvstrøm, and at the Alabama State Open Championships in 1977 where he lost to Mike Cahill.

Fritz's best performance on the professional tour was winning the South Florida Open Championships in West Palm Beach in 1977 against Larry Loeb on the ILTF Independent Tour a worldwide circuit of tournaments not part of the grand prix, and a runner-up finish at the Lagos Open in 1980 on the Grand Prix tennis circuit. He also featured in the main draw of the 1980 US Open and as a doubles player made further appearances at the Australian Open and Wimbledon.

While based in Toronto he qualified to represent Canada and was for a period the top ranked Canadian player. In 1982, he appeared in three Davis Cup ties for his adoptive country. This included the longest Davis Cup match of all time (by number of games), which he won against Jorge Andrew of Venezuela 16–14, 11–9, 9–11, 4–6, 11–9, after a total of 100 games. He played his final singles event in 1984 at the Montreal Alcan Indoors part of the Winter Circuit Alacan.

== Personal life and death ==
His brother Guy Fritz was also a professional tennis player and is the father of Harry's nephew Taylor Fritz.

Harry Fritz died in Palm Springs, California on May 2, 2025, at the age of 74.

== ILTF career finals ==
=== Singles: 1 (1-0) ===
Result	W/L	Date	Tournament	Surface	Opponent	Score
Win	1–0	Feb 1977	South Florida Open Championships	Clay	(United States) Larry Loeb	6-4, 7-6.

== Grand Prix career finals ==
=== Singles: 1 (0–1) ===
Result	W/L	Date	Tournament	Surface	Opponent	Score
Loss	0–1	Mar 1980	Lagos Open	Clay	(Austria) Peter Feigl	2–6, 3–6, 2–6

== See also ==
- List of Canada Davis Cup team representatives
