= 1973 Virginia Slims of Fort Lauderdale =

- Date: February 26 – March 4
- Edition: 3rd
- Category: Grand Prix (A class)
- Draw: 16S / 8D
- Prize money: $20,000
- Surface: Clay (Green) / outdoor
- Location: Fort Lauderdale, Florida, U.S.
- Venue: Tennis Club Stadium

Champions

Singles
- (United States) Chris Evert

Doubles
- (France) Gail Sherriff / (United Kingdom) Virginia Wade
← 1972 ·	Virginia Slims of Fort Lauderdale	· 1974 →

The 1973 Virginia Slims of Fort Lauderdale, also known as the S&H Green Stamp Tennis Classic, was a women's tennis tournament played on outdoor clay courts in Fort Lauderdale, Florida in the United States that was part of the 1973 Women's Grand Prix Circuit (A class). It was the third edition of the tournament and was held from February 26 through March 4, 1973. First-seeded Chris Evert won the singles title.

== Finals ==
=== Singles ===
(United States) Chris Evert defeated (United Kingdom) Virginia Wade 6–1, 6–2

=== Doubles ===
(France) Gail Sherriff / (United Kingdom) Virginia Wade defeated (Australia) Evonne Goolagong / (Australia) Janet Young 4–6, 6–3, 6–2
