= Montclair Athletic Club =

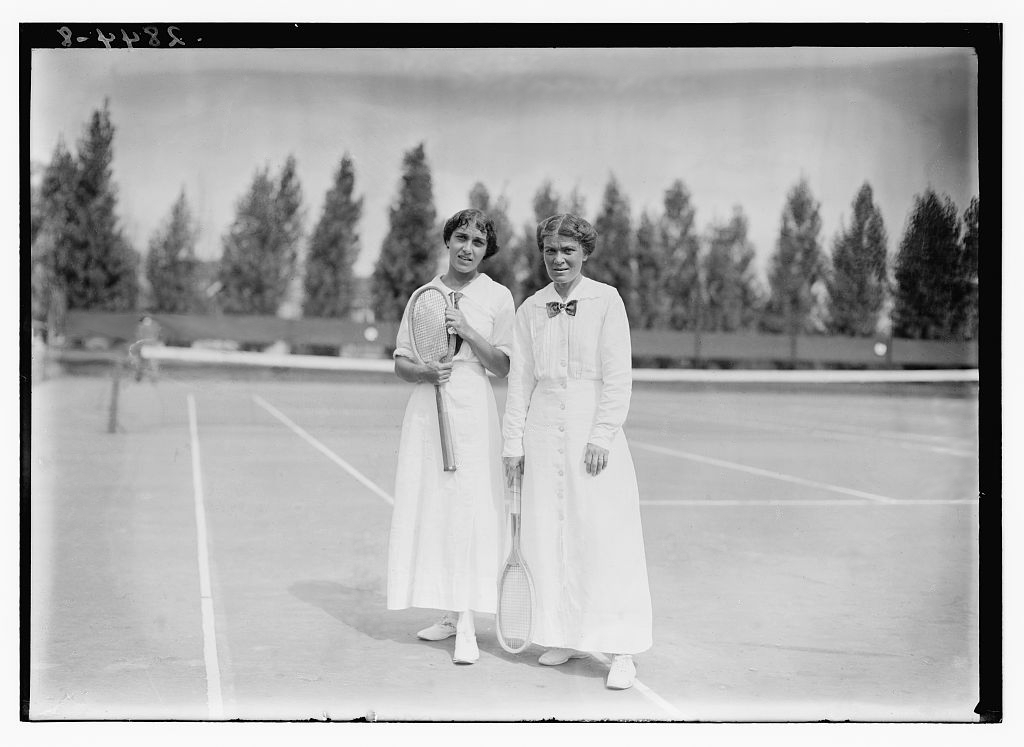
Clare Cassell and Mrs. Marshall McLean at the Montclair Athletic Club on September 19, 1913

The Montclair Athletic Club was a sports venue started in 1899 at 201 Valley Road in Montclair, New Jersey.

== History ==
The precursor to the club was the Montclair Baseball Club which existed from 1883 to 1890, and in 1899 the MAC was created. On September 19, 1913 Clare Cassell won the women's tennis championship at the club.

In 1949 Montclair Kimberley Academy purchased and renovated the building to house the MKA Middle School, grades 4-8.
