= Don Kaiser (tennis) =

American tennis player

- Full name: Donald Gavin Kaiser
- Country (sports): USA
- Born: 1 April 1930; Louisville, Kentucky United States
- Died: 9 April 2020 (age 90); Sarasota, Florida, United States
- Turned pro: 1949 (Amateur Circuit)
- Retired: 1956

Singles
- Career record: 41–36
- Career titles: 4

Grand Slam singles results
- US Open: 1R (1953)

Donald Gavin Kaiser (1 April 1930 – 9 April 2020) was an American tennis player. He was active from 1949 to 1956 and won 4 career singles titles.

== Career ==
Donald Kaiser was born in Louisville, Kentucky United States on 1 April 1930, the son of Edward F. Kaiser and Clarice Bachus Kaiser. He played in the qualifying rounds of the US Championships in 1949 and 1950. In 1953 competed in the main draw at the U.S. National Championships for the first time where he lost in the first round to Grant Golden.

His played his first tournament at the University of Miami Championships in 1950 where he reached the quarter finals. In 1951 he reached his first singles final at the Austin Smith Championships where he lost to Sidney Schwartz. The same year he won his first singles titles at the Ohio State Championships. In 1952 he won the singles titles at the Blue Gray Championships against Wade Herren, the same year he was a finalist at the Ohio State Championships and failed to defend his title against 17 yr old Jack Frost.

In 1953 he reached the finals of the Blue Gray Championships for the second successive year but lost to Ham Richardson, he competed at the Southern Championships in New Orleans where he also made it to the final before losing to Richardson again. That season he reached a third tournament final at the Alabama State Championships where he won the title against Gordon Warden. In 1956 he won his final singles event at the Daniel Boone Invitation in Frankfort, Kentucky against Elam Huddleston. He played his final event at the Kentucky State Championships where he progressed to the final, before losing to Maxwell Brown.
