= Norm Perry (tennis) =

American tennis player

- Full name: Norman Perry
- Country (sports): United States
- Born: May 10, 1938 (age 88) Los Angeles, California

Singles
- Career record: 152-139
- Career titles: 8

Grand Slam singles results
- French Open: 3R (1964)
- US Open: 3R (1962)

Norman Perry (born May 10, 1938) is an American former professional tennis player.

== Tennis career ==
A native of Los Angeles, Perry captained the UCLA Bruins in varsity tennis and was a three-time All-American.

Perry won the Pensacola Championships at Santa Monica, California in 1960 defeating Glenn Bassett in the final.

Perry, on tour in the 1960s and 1970s, made singles third rounds at the French and U.S. championships. In reaching the third round at Roland Garros in 1964 he had a win over Nicholas Kalogeropoulos, 11–9 in the fifth set. He featured in the Wimbledon main draw as a mixed doubles player.

== Personal life ==
Perry is the younger brother of tennis player Bob Perry.
