= Fritz Bastian =

American tennis player

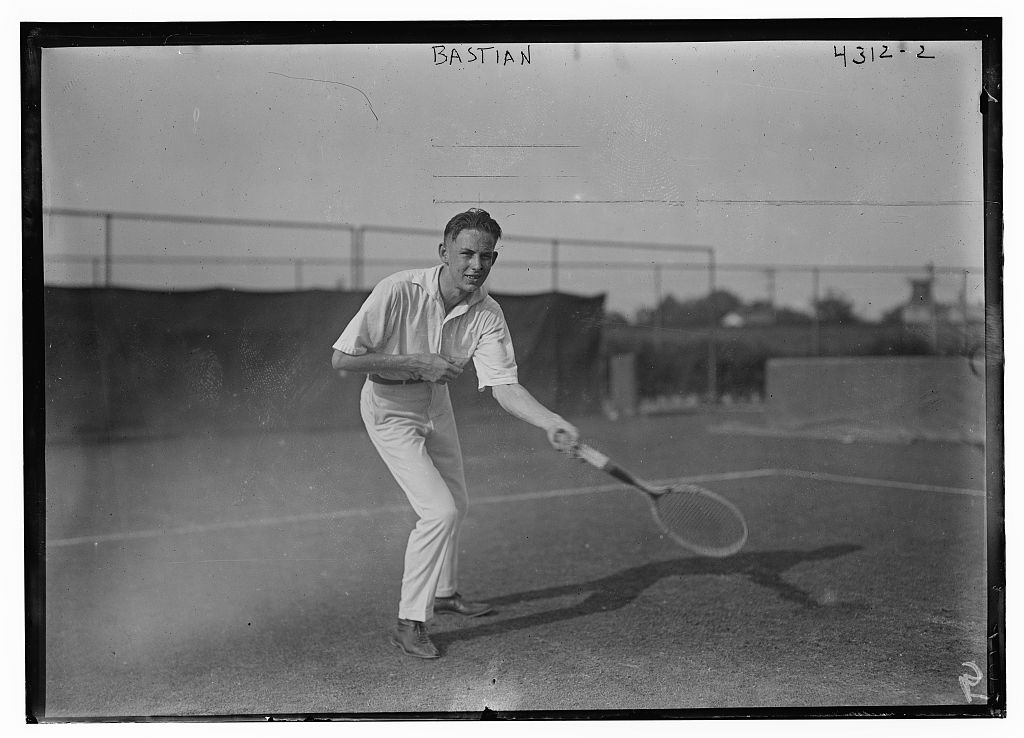
Bastian in 1917

Frederick Ellison "Fritz" Bastian (February 11, 1898 – February 28, 1944) was an American tennis player.

== Biography ==
He was born February 11, 1898, Indianapolis, Indiana.

Bastian, a one-time runner-up in the National Junior tennis championship, won singles titles in 1917 and 1919 at the Cincinnati Open. In winning the 1919 title, Bastian upset U.S. Davis Cup player John Hennessey in the final, 2–6, 6–4, 6–1, 6–4.

Bastian also won a doubles title at Cincinnati (1920, with Hennessey), and was a doubles finalist in 1917 and 1919.

Bastian attended Indiana University, where in 1921 he won the Big Ten Championship and reached the semifinals in singles at the national intercollegiate men's championship.

He died on February 28, 1944.
