= Stephanie DeFina =

American tennis player

- Full name: Stephanie Roberta DeFina
- Country (sports): United States
- Born: March 8, 1946 (age 80) Brooklyn, New York, United States
- Height: 5 ft 2 1/4 in (1.58 m)
- Turned pro: 1959 (ILTF Circuit)
- Retired: 1977
- Plays: Left-handed

Singles
- Career record: 291–143
- Career titles: 29

Grand Slam singles results
- French Open: 2R (1967)
- Wimbledon: 4R (1967)
- US Open: 3R (1962, 1966, 1967)

Doubles

Grand Slam doubles results
- French Open: 3R (1967)
- Wimbledon: 3R (1966)
- US Open: QF (1965, 1966, 1967, 1970)

Grand Slam mixed doubles results
- US Open: QF (1968)

Stephanie DeFina Johnson (born March 8, 1946) is an American former amateur tennis player who was active in the 1960s and mid-1970s.

DeFina was included in the year-end top 10 rankings issued by the United States Lawn Tennis Association from 1966 through 1968, peaking at no. 7 among U.S. players in 1967.

== Career ==
Her best singles result at a Grand Slam tournament was reaching the fourth round of the 1967 Wimbledon Championships, losing to Ann Jones.

In 1966, she reached the final of the U.S. Women's Clay Court Championships, losing to Nancy Richey. In 1969, she was a doubles runner-up at the New England Women's Invitational Indoor Tennis Championships (teaming with Kristy Pigeon), and she was the singles runner-up at the U.S. Indoor Championships.

At the Tri-State Championships in Cincinnati, DeFina won two singles titles: in 1963 (defeating Jane "Peaches" Bartkowicz in the final) and 1965 (defeating Roberta Alison in the final). She also paired with Alison to win the Cincinnati doubles title in 1965.

In 1968, DeFina was a member of the U.S. team that competed for the Wightman Cup, the annual women's competition between the United States and Great Britain. She played the doubles match with Kathy Harter, losing to Christine Truman Janes and Nell Truman.

Her other main career singles highlights include winning the South Florida Open Championships in West Palm Beach six times (1962–1964, 1966–1967, 1969). She won the Denver City Open Championship in Colorado five times (1971, 1973, 1975–1977). She won the Austin Smith Championships in Fort Lauderdale four times (1962–1963, 1966–1967), She also won the City of Miami Invitation Championships four times (1963–1964, 1966, 1969), the Tennessee Valley Invitation (1963) in Chattanooga, and the Florida State Open Championships two times (1963, 1969).

DeFina was a member of the 1974 World Team Tennis champion Denver Racquets.
