= Roberta Alison =

American tennis player

- Country (sports): United States
- Born: December 13, 1943 Alexander City, Alabama, United States
- Died: March 20, 2009 (aged 65) Alexander City, Alabama, United States

Grand Slam singles results
- US Open: 3R (1961, 1963, 1965)

Doubles
- Career titles: 0

Roberta Alison Baumgardner (born December 13, 1943, Alexander City, Alabama – died March 20, 2009, Alexander City, Alabama) was an American tennis player.

== Career ==
She helped pave the way for women's varsity athletics when she joined the men's tennis team at the University of Alabama in 1963, aged 19. Jason Morton, tennis coach at Alabama at the time, found Alison training on grass courts in Tuscaloosa in preparation for the U.S. National Championship (now known as the U.S. Open). He convinced her to attend Alabama and play on the men's tennis team. This was the first official move toward allowing women to participate in varsity athletics in the Southeastern Conference of the NCAA.

She played on the men's team for three years. She was in the No. 4 position her first year but played in either the No. 1 or No. 2 position in her second and third years. Some of the competing schools men's varsity teams would default to her rather than risk playing against a woman and losing.

Alison won the women's collegiate singles title in 1962 and 1963, and paired with Justina Bricka of Missouri for the 1963 NCAA doubles title. Alison also was a four-time Blue Gray champion, and a three-time Southern tournament champion.

She was a member of the Southern Lawn Tennis Hall of Fame, the Southern Tennis Hall of Fame, and was in the first class enshrined into the University of Alabama’s Tennis Hall of Fame. The Roberta Alison Tennis Classic is held each year at the University of Alabama.

She also played the American tennis circuit. At the event in Cincinnati, she was a singles finalist in 1962 and 1965, and won doubles titles in 1962 (with Mary Habicht), 1963 (with Linda Lou Crosby) and 1965 (with Stephanie DeFina).

Roberta won the Southern Championships numerous times both as a junior and also in the Women's Division. She was also a member of the USA's Junior Wightman Cup Team. After her tennis career, Roberta spent her life in Alexander City, AL. As a lover of animals she helped start the Lake Martin Humane Society and was active in LMHS activities for many years.

On April 28, 2012 the University of Alabama dedicated a new indoor tennis facility naming it the Roberta Alison Baumgardner tennis facility.

== Death ==
Roberta Alison Baumgardner spent her life in her native Alabama, where she died on March 20, 2009, aged 65, from injuries she sustained in a fire at her home a week earlier. She was buried in Alexander City's cemetery.
