= Vera Cleto =

Brazilian tennis player

- Full name: Vera Lúcia Cleto Giugni
- Country (sports): Brazil
- Born: 13 March 1950 (age 75)
- Plays: Right-handed

Singles

Grand Slam singles results
- French Open: 1R (1967)

Grand Slam mixed doubles results
- French Open: 2R (1974)
- Wimbledon: 2R (1972)

Vera Lúcia Cleto Giugni (born 13 March 1950) is a Brazilian former professional tennis player. She adopted the name Giugni after marriage but is best known as Vera Cleto.

Cleto, a junior Wimbledon semi-finalist and Orange Bowl runner-up, was associated with the Esporte Clube Pinheiros in São Paulo. She won her first Brazilian senior national championship at the age of 16.

In 1967 she featured in the singles main draw of the French Championships, losing in the first round to Virginia Wade.

Her career included four years playing for the Brazil Federation Cup team, from 1976 to 1978, then again in 1982. She later served as team captain for several campaigns.
