= Marta Hernández =

Mexican tennis player

- Born: c. 1940 Mexico
- Died: July 6, 2000 (aged 59–60) Punta Gorda, Florida, U.S.

Marta Hernández (usually spelled Martha Hernandez), of Mexico was an amateur tennis player, active during the 1950s and 1960s.

== Career ==
In 1956, she was Mexican Women's Singles champion and was co-winner of the Mexican Doubles title from 1954 to 1959. In 1956 she and compatriot Yola Ramírez were runner-ups in the doubles event at the U.S. Women's Clay Court Championships, losing the final in straight sets to Shirley Fry and Dorothy Knode. In 1959, Hernández reached the singles finals at the Canadian Open, before falling to Australian Marie Martin. She also reached the doubles final in Canada that year (with partner Marilyn Montgomery).

In 1958, at the Cincinnati Masters, she won the doubles title (with Montgomery) and reached the singles final, only to fall to 17-year-old American Gwyn Thomas.

She took a 15-year sabbatical to marry developer Sam Burchers and raise their two sons, then reemerged in 1975. She died in Punta Gorda, Florida on July 6, 2000. The tennis courts at Charlotte High School in Punta Gorda were named in her honor.
