= Clare Cassell =

American tennis player

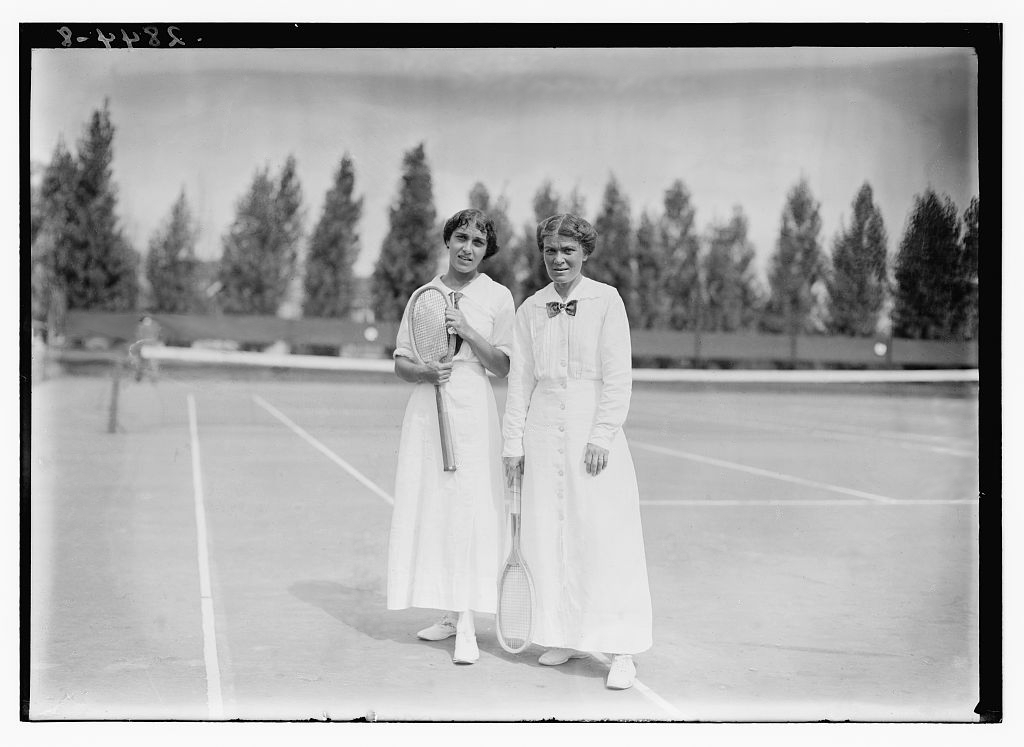
Clare Cassell and Mrs. Marshall McLean at the Montclair Athletic Club on September 19, 1913

Clare Cassell was an American lawn tennis champion from the Bronxville Athletic Association. In 1913 she won the Montclair Athletic Club women's tournament, despite spraining her ankle.
