= Andy Lloyd (tennis) =

American tennis player

- Full name: Andrew Lloyd
- Country (sports): United States
- Born: Abt. 1942
- Plays: Right-handed

Grand Slam singles results
- US Open: QF (1962)

Andrew Lloyd (b. circa 1942) is a former US tennis player. He reached the quarterfinals at the 1962 US Open.

From Shreveport, Louisiana, Lloyd began his international playing career at the 1961 US Open, where he was beaten in the third round by the then strongest player in the world (the Wimbledon winner), Australian Rod Laver.

In the 1962 US Open, Lloyd lasted until the quarterfinal, when he was defeated by the Australian champion Roy Emerson. In the 1963 US Open, he lost in the first round to the unknown Australian Anthony Ryan in four sets. Lloyd did not appear in any further Grand Slam tennis tournaments.

At the Cincinnati Open, Lloyd reached the round of 16 in both 1961 and 1964.
