= Eduardo Zuleta =

Ecuadorian tennis player (1935–2024)

- Country (sports): Ecuador
- Born: 19 November 1935 Guayaquil, Ecuador
- Died: 1 April 2024 (aged 88) Guayaquil, Ecuador
- Turned pro: 1959 (ILTF World Circuit)
- Retired: 1979
- Plays: right handed

Singles
- Career record: 364–289
- Career titles: 12

Grand Slam singles results
- French Open: 3R (1966)
- Wimbledon: 2R (1964, 1966)
- US Open: 4R (1960)

Eduardo Zuleta (19 November 1935 – 1 April 2024) was an Ecuadorian right-handed international tennis player. He was active from 1959 to 1979 and won 12 career singles titles.

== Biography ==
Eduardo Zuleta was born on 19 November 1935. He played his first tournament at 1959 Pan American Games. He won his first singles title in 1960 at the Tennessee Valley Invitation. He competed in the Davis Cup in 1961 and 1963. Eduardo competed on the U.S. as well as the European summer tennis circuit in the late 1950s-to late 1970s, with notably more success on slow clay surfaces, on which he was a very steady and indefatigable retriever, than on the faster grass, which was a much more popular surface in his day than it is today.

At the tournament now known as the Cincinnati Masters, Zuleta reached the semifinals in 1961, the quarterfinals in 1963, and the Round of 16 in both 1959 and 1960. In 1964 Zuleta won the Austin Smith Championships at Ft. Lauderdale, Fl. defeating in turn Frank Froehling, Lester Sack, Thomaz Koch and Gardnar Mulloy in a five set final. In 1964 he won the Tournoi d'août du Touquet in Le Touquet, France against Bernard Paul.

In 1969 he won his fourth straight South Florida Championships title, defeating Guillermo Vilas in a close semifinal. He also won the Florida State Championships two times in Orlando in 1967 and 1969. He won the Leverkusen International in Germany 1964. In 1970 he won the La Baule International defeating Pierre Jauffret in the final in a close five set match. He played his final singles tournament at the Roland Garros qualifiers in 1979.

When not on the tournament circuit he practiced in Miami, where he was well known for hitting against a wall for hours, which gave him callouses on his racket hand a good quarter of an inch thick that he would shave down at night with a razor blade.

Zuleta toured at times with Ecuadorians Washington Suarez and Davis Cupper Miguel Olvera. Zuleta had the nickname El Barco ("The Ship") in his home country because he invariably returned there from his tennis tours with suitcases full of tennis equipment and clothing that he received free from manufacturers as goodwill advertising.

Perhaps his most conspicuous debut on the tennis stage was his first-round encounter on the grass of the U.S. Championships at Forest Hills, New York, in 1963 with then U.S. No. 1 Chuck McKinley, who had just won Wimbledon two months earlier. The outcome was a foregone conclusion in straight sets, but Eduardo put up a creditable fight.

Zuleta died in Guayaquil on 1 April 2024, at the age of 88.

== Sources ==
- From Club Court to Center Court, The Evolution of Professional Tennis in Cincinnati by Phillip S. Smith (2008 Edition; ISBN 978-0-9712445-7-3)
