= 2023 F2000 Italian Formula Trophy =

Motor racing championship

The 2023 Zinox Laser F2000 Italian Formula Trophy was a multi-event open-wheel single seater motor racing championship. This was the tenth season of the series, featuring a mix of professional and amateur drivers competing in different classes and using multiple kinds of Formula 3- and Formula Renault-level machinery. For the 2023 season, the title sponsor of the championship changed from TopJet to Zinox Laser. The championship had a cooperation with the Drexler-Automotive Formula Cup, with the two series sharing grids and race slots on multiple race weekends.

== Teams and drivers ==
Teams and drivers competing in the F2000 Trophy were divided into four classes: Platinum, Gold, Silver and Bronze ranked the field based on the cars' age and technical characteristics as well as the drivers' experience. For competition in the F2.0 Cup, the field was divided into Pro and Light entries.

=== F2000 Trophy entries ===
Team	No.	Driver	Car	Engine	Status	Rounds
Super Formula Class entries
(Italy) Puresport	8	(Italy) Dino Rasero	Dallara 320	Mercedes HWA		1–3, 5
(Japan) Noda Racing	10	(Japan) Juju Noda	Dallara 320	Volkswagen		All
(Italy) TVS Motorsport	23	(Italy) Enzo Stentella	Dallara 320	Mercedes		All
(Italy) HT Powertrain	51	(Italy) Bernardo Pellegrini	Dallara 320	Mercedes HWA		All
(Italy) BVM Racing	84	(Italy) Francesco Simonazzi	Dallara 320	Volkswagen	G	1
(Italy) G Motorsport	131	(Italy) Francesco Galli	Dallara 320	Volkswagen		All
(Serbia) NV Racing	212	(Serbia) Paolo Brajnik	Dallara 320	Volkswagen		1
Platinum Class entries
(Austria) Franz Wöss Racing	1	(Hungary) Benjamin Berta	Dallara F317	Mercedes		All
Racing in Italy	75	(Israel) Mei Shibi	Dallara F308	Volkswagen		2–3, 5–7
(Italy) HT Powertrain	20	(Denmark) Stig Larsen	Dallara F317	Volkswagen		All
(Italy) One Sport Performance	21	(Italy) Alessandro Bracalente	Dallara F317	Volkswagen		1
(Italy) One Sport Performance	21	(Italy) Renato Papaleo	Dallara F317			4, 6–7
(Italy) Facondini Racing	36	(Italy) Francesco Solfaroli	Dallara F317	Toyota		1–2, 4–7
privateer	41	(Italy) Franco Cimarelli	Dallara F312	Volkswagen		1, 6–7
(Switzerland) Jo Zeller Racing	44	(Switzerland) Sandro Zeller	Dallara F316	Mercedes HWA		All
(Italy) Team Perego	46	(Italy) Riccardo Perego	Dallara F317	Volkswagen		1–5
(Italy) Antonino Racing	77	(Italy) Antonio Pellegrini	Dallara F308			7
(Italy) Nannini Racing	81	(Italy) Marco Falci	Dallara F317	Toyota		1–2
(Italy) Emotion Motorsport	83	(Italy) Daniele Radrizzani	Dallara F317	Toyota		1–2, 4
Gold Class entries
(Italy) Facondini Racing	6	(Italy) Enrico Milani	Dallara F308			2, 4–5, 7
(Italy) Puresport	14	(Italy) Andrea Benalli	Dallara F309	Power Engine		1–3, 5–7
(Italy) Neri Autosport	18	(Italy) Victor Neumann	Dallara F311			2
(Italy) Neri Autosport	30	(France) Sebastien Banchereau	Dallara F310			2, 6
(Germany) Rennsport Wachter	22	(Canada) Victor Smialek	Dallara F308			7
(Italy) One Sport Performance	23	(Italy) Marco Marotta	Dallara F312	Volkswagen		5
(Italy) Team Automobile Tricolore	39	(Italy) Edoardo Bonanomi	Dallara F312	Mercedes		1–3, 5, 7
(Italy) Nannini Racing	42	(Italy) Davide Pedetti	Dallara F317	Toyota		All
(Italy) Nannini Racing	81	(Italy) Giancarlo Pedetti	Dallara F317			4–7
(Czech Republic) Chabr Motorsport	54	(Czech Republic) Tomas Chabr	Dallara F308			7
(France) Sud Motorsport	90	(Italy) Antonino Marco Rinaldi	Dallara F302			2
(Austria) Franz Wöss Racing	98	(Germany) Maximilian Malinowski	Dallara F309			7
Silver Class entries
(Italy) Team Tramonti Corse	11	(Italy) Carmine Tancredi (Note: Carmine Tancredi entered rounds 1 and 2 competing in the Bronze class, and stepped up to the Silver class from round 3 onwards)	Dallara F308	Toyota		3–4
(Italy) Living KC	12	(Italy) Umberto Vaglio	Dallara F308			2, 5
(Italy) Twister Italia	13	(Italy) Sergio Terrini	Dallara F308	Fiat FTP		1–3
(Italy) Bellspeed	27	(Italy) Patrick Bellezza	Dallara F300	Fiat Novamotor		1–2, 5–7
(Italy) BMG Racing	28	(Italy) Giorgio Berto	Dallara F308	Fiat		1–2, 7
(France) Sud Motorsport	33	(Italy) Salvatore Marinaro	Dallara F310	Fiat		1–2, 4, 6–7
(Italy) 2F Motorsport	35	(Italy) Ferruccio Fontanella	Dallara F308			4
(Italy) Puresport	76	(Switzerland) Christof Ledermann	Dallara F309	Power Engine		3, 5
Bronze Class entries
(Italy) Valentino Racing Team	4	(Italy) Valentino Carofano	Lola F3	Dome		7
(France) Sud Motorsport	7	(Italy) Armando Stola	Dallara			6
(France) Sud Motorsport	85	(Italy) Daniele Siano	Dallara F308	Fiat		1
(Austria) Franz Wöss Racing	9	(Italy) Luca Iannacone	Dallara F308	Toyota		1, 3, 6
(Italy) Team Tramonti Corse	11	(Italy) Carmine Tancredi (Note: Carmine Tancredi entered rounds 1 and 2 competing in the Bronze class, and stepped up to the Silver class from round 3 onwards)	Dallara F308	Toyota		1–2
Formula Entry Class entries
privateer	34	(Italy) Sergio Conti	Tatuus F4-T014	Abarth		1–2, 5–6

=== F2.0 Cup entries ===
All drivers compete driving Tatuus FR2.0 cars with Renault engines.

Team	No.	Driver	Rounds
Light Class entries
(Italy) Alpha Team Racing	3	(Italy) Sandro de Virgilis	7
(Italy) Derva Corse ASD	24	(Italy) Marco de Toffol	2–4
(Italy) A.S.D. Ruote Scoperte M.	79	(Italy) Fabio Turchetto	1–4, 6
(Italy) A.S.D. Ruote Scoperte M.	80	(Italy) Andrea Masci	6–7
(Italy) A.S.D. Ruote Scoperte M.	222	(Italy) Stefano Pezzoni	7
(Italy) Valdelsa CLA	59	(Italy) Riccardo Rossi	6–7
(Italy) Team Hars	71	(Italy) Luca Guolo	6–7
(Italy) Padoviani Corse ASD	89	(Italy) Simone Padoviani	1–2, 4, 6–7
Open Class entries
(Italy) Viola Formula Racing	2	(Italy) Laurence Balestrini	1–3
(Italy) Speed Motor	5	(Italy) Karim Sartori	1–4, 6–7
(Italy) Derva Corse ASD	16	(Italy) Matteo Immordino	1–4, 6–7
(Italy) Derva Corse ASD	95	(Italy) Christian Caramuscia	1–4, 6–7
(Italy) PLMRACING	29	(Italy) Stefano Palummieri	1–4, 6–7

== Race calendar ==
The 2023 calendar was first announced on 21 January 2023.

Race weekend held races of the FR2.0 Cup

Round		Circuit	Date	Support bill	Map of circuit locations
1	R1	(Italy) Mugello Circuit, Scarperia e San Piero	25 March	24H Series (12 Hours of Mugello); Drexler-Automotive Formula Cup	2023 F2000 Italian Formula Trophy is located in Europe
1	R2	(Italy) Mugello Circuit, Scarperia e San Piero	25 March	24H Series (12 Hours of Mugello); Drexler-Automotive Formula Cup	2023 F2000 Italian Formula Trophy is located in Europe
2	R1	(Italy) Imola Circuit, Imola	22 April	TCR Italian Series; Formula Regional European Championship	2023 F2000 Italian Formula Trophy is located in Europe
2	R2	(Italy) Imola Circuit, Imola	23 April	TCR Italian Series; Formula Regional European Championship	2023 F2000 Italian Formula Trophy is located in Europe
3	R1	(Austria) Red Bull Ring, Spielberg	21 May	ESET Cup; TCR Eastern Europe	2023 F2000 Italian Formula Trophy is located in Europe
3	R2	(Austria) Red Bull Ring, Spielberg	21 May	ESET Cup; TCR Eastern Europe	2023 F2000 Italian Formula Trophy is located in Europe
4	R1	(Italy) Vallelunga Circuit, Campagnano di Roma	10 June	TCR World Tour; TCR Italian Festival	2023 F2000 Italian Formula Trophy is located in Europe
4	R2	(Italy) Vallelunga Circuit, Campagnano di Roma	11 June	TCR World Tour; TCR Italian Festival	2023 F2000 Italian Formula Trophy is located in Europe
5	R1	(Belgium) Circuit de Spa-Francorchamps, Stavelot	8 July	Spa Summer Classics; Spa 3 Hours	2023 F2000 Italian Formula Trophy is located in Europe
5	R2	(Belgium) Circuit de Spa-Francorchamps, Stavelot	9 July	Spa Summer Classics; Spa 3 Hours	2023 F2000 Italian Formula Trophy is located in Europe
6	R1	(Italy) Mugello Circuit, Scarperia e San Piero	8 October	BOSS GP Series; Drexler-Automotive Formula Cup	2023 F2000 Italian Formula Trophy is located in Europe
6	R2	(Italy) Mugello Circuit, Scarperia e San Piero	8 October	BOSS GP Series; Drexler-Automotive Formula Cup	2023 F2000 Italian Formula Trophy is located in Europe
7	R1	(Italy) Misano World Circuit Marco Simoncelli, Misano Adriatico	5 November	Coppa Italia Turismo; National GT Challenge	2023 F2000 Italian Formula Trophy is located in Europe
7	R2	(Italy) Misano World Circuit Marco Simoncelli, Misano Adriatico	5 November	Coppa Italia Turismo; National GT Challenge	2023 F2000 Italian Formula Trophy is located in Europe

== Race results ==
=== F2000 Trophy results ===
Round			Pole position	Super Formula winner	Platinum winner	Gold winner	Silver winner	Bronze winner	Formula Entry winner
1	R1	(Italy) Mugello Circuit	(Japan) Juju Noda (Note: Francesco Simonazzi was fastest in qualifying, but competed as a guest driver)	(Japan) Juju Noda (Note: Francesco Simonazzi crossed the line as the first of the Super Formula Class drivers, but competed as a guest driver)	(Hungary) Benjamin Berta	(Italy) Andrea Benalli	(Italy) Patrick Bellezza	(Italy) Daniele Siano	(Italy) Sergio Conti
1	R2	(Italy) Mugello Circuit		(Japan) Juju Noda (Note: Francesco Simonazzi crossed the line as the first of the Super Formula Class drivers, but competed as a guest driver)	(Italy) Marco Falci	(Italy) Andrea Benalli	(Italy) Sergio Terrini	(Italy) Daniele Siano	(Italy) Sergio Conti
2	R1	(Italy) Imola Circuit	(Hungary) Benjamin Berta	(Italy) Bernardo Pellegrini	(Hungary) Benjamin Berta	(Italy) Andrea Benalli	(Italy) Patrick Bellezza	(Italy) Carmine Tancredi	(Italy) Sergio Conti
2	R2	(Italy) Imola Circuit		(Italy) Bernardo Pellegrini	(Hungary) Benjamin Berta	(Italy) Andrea Benalli	(Italy) Patrick Bellezza	(Italy) Carmine Tancredi	(Italy) Sergio Conti
3	R1	(Austria) Red Bull Ring	(Hungary) Benjamin Berta	(Japan) Juju Noda	(Hungary) Benjamin Berta	(Italy) Davide Pedetti	no finishers	(Italy) Luca Iannacone	no entries
3	R2	(Austria) Red Bull Ring		(Italy) Francesco Galli	(Hungary) Benjamin Berta	(Italy) Andrea Benalli	(Switzerland) Christof Ledermann	(Italy) Luca Iannacone	no entries
4	R1	(Italy) Vallelunga Circuit	(Japan) Juju Noda	(Italy) Bernardo Pellegrini	(Switzerland) Sandro Zeller	(Italy) Enrico Milani	(Italy) Salvatore Marinaro	no entries	no entries
4	R2	(Italy) Vallelunga Circuit		(Japan) Juju Noda	(Switzerland) Sandro Zeller	(Italy) Enrico Milani	(Italy) Ferruccio Fontanella	no entries	no entries
5	R1	(Belgium) Spa-Francorchamps	(Japan) Juju Noda	(Japan) Juju Noda	(Hungary) Benjamin Berta	(Italy) Andrea Benalli	(Italy) Patrick Bellezza	no entries	(Italy) Sergio Conti
5	R2	(Belgium) Spa-Francorchamps		(Japan) Juju Noda	(Hungary) Benjamin Berta	(Italy) Andrea Benalli	(Italy) Patrick Bellezza	no entries	(Italy) Sergio Conti
6	R1	(Italy) Mugello Circuit	(Italy) Francesco Galli	(Italy) Francesco Galli	(Hungary) Benjamin Berta	(Italy) Andrea Benalli	(Italy) Salvatore Marinaro	(Italy) Luca Iannacone	(Italy) Sergio Conti
6	R2	(Italy) Mugello Circuit		(Japan) Juju Noda	(Hungary) Benjamin Berta	(Italy) Andrea Benalli	(Italy) Patrick Bellezza	(Italy) Luca Iannacone	(Italy) Sergio Conti
7	R1	(Italy) Misano Circuit	(Japan) Juju Noda	(Japan) Juju Noda	(Hungary) Benjamin Berta	(Canada) Victor Smialek	(Italy) Salvatore Marinaro	(Italy) Valentino Carofano	no entries
7	R2	(Italy) Misano Circuit		(Italy) Francesco Galli	(Switzerland) Sandro Zeller	(Canada) Victor Smialek	(Italy) Patrick Bellezza	(Italy) Valentino Carofano	no entries

=== F2.0 Cup results ===
Round			Pole position	Light Class winner	Open Class winner
1	R1	(Italy) Mugello Circuit	(Italy) Christian Caramuscia	(Italy) Fabio Turchetto	(Italy) Karim Sartori
1	R2	(Italy) Mugello Circuit		(Italy) Fabio Turchetto	(Italy) Christian Caramuscia
2	R1	(Italy) Imola Circuit	(Italy) Stefano Palummieri	(Italy) Fabio Turchetto	(Italy) Karim Sartori
2	R2	(Italy) Imola Circuit		(Italy) Fabio Turchetto	(Italy) Stefano Palummieri
3	R1	(Austria) Red Bull Ring	(Italy) Karim Sartori	(Italy) Marco de Toffol	(Italy) Christian Caramuscia
3	R2	(Austria) Red Bull Ring		(Italy) Fabio Turchetto	(Italy) Stefano Palummieri
4	R1	(Italy) Vallelunga Circuit	(Italy) Stefano Palummieri	(Italy) Fabio Turchetto	(Italy) Stefano Palummieri
4	R2	(Italy) Vallelunga Circuit		(Italy) Fabio Turchetto	(Italy) Stefano Palummieri
5	R1	(Italy) Mugello Circuit	(Italy) Karim Sartori	(Italy) Andrea Masci	(Italy) Karim Sartori
5	R2	(Italy) Mugello Circuit		(Italy) Fabio Turchetto	(Italy) Karim Sartori
6	R1	(Italy) Misano Circuit	(Italy) Stefano Palummieri	(Italy) Simone Padoviani	(Italy) Karim Sartori
6	R2	(Italy) Misano Circuit		(Italy) Andrea Masci	(Italy) Christian Caramuscia

== Standings ==
=== Scoring system ===
Drivers scored points in the overall standings, as well as in separate standings per class. Five points were awarded to each driver attending an event. Claiming the fastest lap per race per class awarded a point if at least three cars took part in a class. Entrants counted the best eleven race results of their campaign, as well as the attendance points for all race weekends.

Position	1st	2nd	3rd	4th	5th	6th	7th	8th	9th	10th
Points	25	18	15	12	10	8	6	4	2	1

=== Drivers' standings ===
==== Overall standings ====
Pos	Driver	MUG1 (Italy)		IMO (Italy)		RBR (Austria)		VLL (Italy)		SPA (Belgium)		MUG2 (Italy)		MIS (Italy)		Pts
Pos	Driver	R1	R2	R1	R2	R1	R2	R1	R2	R1	R2	R1	R2	R1	R2	Pts
1	(Japan) Juju Noda	(5)	2	3	(4)	2	(Ret)	3	1	1	1	3	1	1	2	275
2	(Hungary) Benjamin Berta	2	7	1	1	1	1	(Ret)	(DNS)	2	2	2	3	2	(Ret)	261
3	(Switzerland) Sandro Zeller	4	(5)	4	2	3	2	1	4	3	3	(5)	(5)	4	3	209
4	(Italy) Francesco Galli	(Ret)	6	5	(23)	(22)	3	5	2	4	5	1	2	3	1	204
5	(Italy) Bernardo Pellegrini	(11)	4	2	3	4	(Ret)	2	3	(5)	4	4	4	5	4	186
6	(Italy) Riccardo Perego	7	(10)	7	5	(Ret)	4	4	5	(7)	7	6	7	7	5	129
7	(Italy) Andrea Benalli	9	12	8	6	(Ret)	5			6	6	7	6	12	Ret	92
8	(Italy) Davide Pedetti	12	13	9	8	5	7	9	10	12	13	11	11	17	8	64
9	(Italy) Enzo Stentella	10	11	(28)	15	8	23	(Ret)	7	(Ret)	9	10	8	13	7	61
10	(Italy) Dino Rasero	8	9	6	Ret	Ret	6			14	DNS					51
11	(Italy) Marco Falci	3	3	Ret	DNS											48
12	(Denmark) Stig Larsen	19	18	13	(Ret)	7	(22)	10	11	16	16	8	14	21	(Ret)	47
13	(Italy) Francesco Solfaroli	(30)	15	16	13			8	9	8	11	14	12	16	13	41
14	(Italy) Enrico Milani			Ret	7			7	8	9	19			18	24	40
15	(Israel) Mei Shibi			12	Ret	6	Ret			15	14	9	17	14	9	37
16	(Italy) Stefano Palummieri	18	23	21	16	15	8	12	14			18	18	34	(DNS)	37
17	(Italy) Renato Papaleo							6	6			Ret	9	10	16	34
18	(Italy) Karim Sartori	13	28†	11	17	Ret	9	(DNS)	15			16	16	20	NC	34
19	(Italy) Christian Caramuscia	15	21	20	21	9	11	14	16			(25)	23	25	17	34
20	(Italy) Patrick Bellezza	16	20	18	11					17	12	17	19	32	14	33
21	(Italy) Matteo Immordino	21†	26	Ret	26	10	14	17	18			21	20	23	18	32
22	(Italy) Salvatore Marinaro	26†	31†	19	28			11	17			12	Ret	22	15	28
23	(Italy) Fabio Turchetto	24	27	23	19	14	10	16	19			27	21			27
24	(Italy) Simone Padoviani	25	30	27	27			19	21			24	25	26	Ret	25
25	(Italy) Edoardo Bonanomi	28†	17	14	10	DNS	DNS			10	20			19	11	22
26	(Italy) Alessandro Bracalente	6	8													21
27	(Italy) Giancarlo Pedetti							13	13	13	10	15	15	Ret	DNS	21
28	(Canada) Victor Smialek													9	6	20
29	(Italy) Franco Cimarelli	32	14									Ret	10	8	Ret	20
30	(Italy) Daniele Radrizzani	29†	19	15	14			Ret	22							20
31	(Italy) Sergio Conti	27	33	29	29					19	18	28	27			20
32	(Italy) Marco de Toffol			26	22	11	15	18	20							15
33	(Italy) Laurence Balestrini	22	24	Ret	18	12	13									15
34	(Italy) Carmine Tancredi	17	25	17	12	DNS	DNS	15	Ret							15
35	(Italy) Luca Iannacone	23	29			13	16					19	22			15
36	(Italy) Sergio Terrini	Ret	16	24	DNS	Ret	DNS									15
37	(Italy) Giorgio Berto	20	32†	25	25									24	Ret	15
38	(Italy) Antonio Pellegrini													6	DNS	13
39	(France) Sebastien Banchereau			10	9							13	13			13
40	(Switzerland) Christof Ledermann					Ret	12			18	15					10
41	(Italy) Umberto Vaglio			22	20					Ret	17					10
42	(Italy) Andrea Masci											22	DNS	27	19	10
43	(Italy) Luca Guolo											23	24	30	21	10
44	(Italy) Riccardo Rossi											26	26	31	EX	10
45	(Italy) Marco Marotta									11	8					9
46	(Czech Republic) Tomas Chabr													15	10	6
47	(Germany) Maximilian Malinowski													11	12	5
48	(Italy) Ferruccio Fontanella							Ret	12							5
49	(Italy) Armando Stola											20	28	35	DNS	5
50	(Italy) Daniele Siano	14	22													5
51	(Italy) Sandro de Virgilis													33	20	5
52	(Italy) Stefano Pezzoni													28	22	5
53	(Italy) Valentino Carofano													29	23	5
54	(Italy) Antonino Marco Rinaldi			31	24											5
55	(Serbia) Paolo Brajnik	DNS	DNS													5
56	(Italy) Victor Neumann			DNS	DNS											5
guest drivers ineligible to score points
—	(Italy) Francesco Simonazzi	1	1													—
Pos	Driver	MUG1 (Italy)		IMO (Italy)		RBR (Austria)		VLL (Italy)		SPA (Belgium)		MUG2 (Italy)		MIS (Italy)		Pts
Pos	Driver	R1	R2	R1	R2	R1	R2	R1	R2	R1	R2	R1	R2	R1	R2	Pts

==== F2000 standings per class ====
Pos	Driver	MUG1 (Italy)		IMO (Italy)		RBR (Austria)		VLL (Italy)		SPA (Belgium)		MUG2 (Italy)		MIS (Italy)		Pts
Pos	Driver	R1	R2	R1	R2	R1	R2	R1	R2	R1	R2	R1	R2	R1	R2	Pts
Super Formula Class
1	(Japan) Juju Noda	1	1	(2)	(2)	1	(Ret)	2	1	1	1	2	1	1	2	301
2	(Italy) Francesco Galli	(Ret)	4	3	(4)	(4)	1	3	2	2	3	1	2	2	1	243
3	(Italy) Bernardo Pellegrini	(5)	3	1	1	2	(Ret)	1	(3)	3	2	3	3	3	3	233
4	(Italy) Enzo Stentella	4	(6)	5	3	3	3	(Ret)	4	(Ret)	4	4	4	4	4	177
5	(Italy) Dino Rasero	3	5	4	Ret	Ret	2			4	DNS					97
6	(Serbia) Paolo Brajnik	DNS	DNS													5
guest drivers ineligible to score points
—	(Italy) Francesco Simonazzi	1	1													—
Platinum Class
1	(Hungary) Benjamin Berta	1	3	1	1	1	1	(Ret)	(DNS)	1	1	1	1	1	(Ret)	309
2	(Switzerland) Sandro Zeller	(3)	(2)	(2)	2	2	2	1	1	2	2	2	2	2	1	257
3	(Italy) Riccardo Perego	(5)	(5)	3	3	(Ret)	3	2	2	3	3	3	3	4	2	206
4	(Denmark) Stig Larsen	6	8	5	(Ret)	4	4	5	5	6	6	4	7	(9)	(Ret)	139
5	(Italy) Francesco Solfaroli	(8)	7	7	4			4	4	4	4	6	6	8	4	122
6	(Israel) Mei Shibi			4	Ret	3	Ret			5	5	5	8	7	3	107
7	(Italy) Renato Papaleo							3	3			Ret	4	6	5	75
8	(Italy) Marco Falci	2	1	Ret	DNS											55
9	(Italy) Daniele Radrizzani	7†	9	6	5			Ret	6							54
10	(Italy) Franco Cimarelli	9	6									Ret	5	5	Ret	43
11	(Italy) Alessandro Bracalente	4	4													29
12	(Italy) Antonio Pellegrini													3	DNS	20
Gold Class
1	(Italy) Andrea Benalli	1	1	1	1	(Ret)	1			1	1	1	1	3	Ret	278
2	(Italy) Davide Pedetti	2	2	2	3	1	2	2	2	(5)	(4)	2	2	(5)	2	234
3	(Italy) Enrico Milani			Ret	2			1	1	2	5			6	6	134
4	(Italy) Edoardo Bonanomi	3†	3	4	5	DNS	DNS			3	6			7	4	113
5	(Italy) Giancarlo Pedetti							3	3	6	3	4	4	Ret	DNS	97
6	(France) Sebastien Banchereau			3	4							3	3			67
7	(Canada) Victor Smialek													1	1	57
8	(Germany) Maximilian Malinowski													2	5	41
9	(Italy) Marco Marotta									4	2					35
10	(Czech Republic) Tomas Chabr													4	3	34
11	(Italy) Antonino Marco Rinaldi			5	6											23
12	(Italy) Victor Neumann			DNS	DNS											5
Silver Class
1	(Italy) Patrick Bellezza	1	2	1	1					1	1	2	1	3	1	260
2	(Italy) Salvatore Marinaro	3†	3†	2	4			1	2			1	Ret	1	2	201
3	(Italy) Giorgio Berto	2	4†	5	3									2	Ret	88
4	(Switzerland) Christof Ledermann					Ret	1			2	2					71
5	(Italy) Umberto Vaglio			3	2					Ret	3					58
6	(Italy) Sergio Terrini	Ret	1	4	DNS	Ret	DNS									53
7	(Italy) Ferruccio Fontanella							Ret	1							31
8	(Italy) Carmine Tancredi					DNS	DNS	2	Ret							23
Bronze Class
1	(Italy) Luca Iannacone	3	3			1	1					1	1			145
2	(Italy) Carmine Tancredi	2	2	1	1											97
3	(Italy) Armando Stola											2	2	2	DNS	64
4	(Italy) Daniele Siano	1	1													56
5	(Italy) Valentino Carofano													1	1	55
Formula Entry Class
1	(Italy) Sergio Conti	1	1	1	1					1	1	1	1			220
Pos	Driver	MUG1 (Italy)		IMO (Italy)		RBR (Austria)		VLL (Italy)		SPA (Belgium)		MUG2 (Italy)		MIS (Italy)		Pts
Pos	Driver	R1	R2	R1	R2	R1	R2	R1	R2	R1	R2	R1	R2	R1	R2	Pts

==== F2.0 Cup standings per class ====
Pos	Driver	MUG1 (Italy)		IMO (Italy)		RBR (Austria)		VLL (Italy)		MUG2 (Italy)		MIS (Italy)		Pts
Pos	Driver	R1	R2	R1	R2	R1	R2	R1	R2	R1	R2	R1	R2	Pts
Overall
1	(Italy) Stefano Palummieri	3	2	3	1	6	1	1	1	2	2	10	DNS	226
2	(Italy) Karim Sartori	1	6†	1	2	Ret	2	DNS	2	1	1	1	NC	220
3	(Italy) Christian Caramuscia	2	1	2	5	1	4	2	3	7	5	2	1	219
4	(Italy) Matteo Immordino	4†	4	Ret	7	2	6	4	4	3	3	2	2	165
5	(Italy) Fabio Turchetto	6	5	4	4	5	3	3	5	8	4			140
6	(Italy) Simone Padoviani	7	7	6	8			6	7	5	7	4	Ret	91
7	(Italy) Laurence Balestrini	5	3	Ret	3	4	5							77
8	(Italy) Marco de Toffol			5	6	3	7	5	6					73
9	(Italy) Andrea Masci									3	DNS	5	3	50
10	(Italy) Luca Guolo									4	6	7	5	46
11	(Italy) Riccardo Rossi									7	8	8	EX	24
12	(Italy) Stefano Pezzoni											6	6	21
13	(Italy) Sandro de Virgilis											9	4	19
Light Class
1	(Italy) Fabio Turchetto	1	1	1	1	2	1	1	1	5	1			258
2	(Italy) Simone Padoviani	2	2	3	3			3	3	3	3	1	Ret	177
3	(Italy) Marco de Toffol			2	2	1	2	2	2					130
4	(Italy) Andrea Masci									1	DNS	2	1	80
5	(Italy) Luca Guolo									2	2	4	3	73
6	(Italy) Riccardo Rossi									4	4	5	EX	44
7	(Italy) Stefano Pezzoni											3	4	32
8	(Italy) Sandro de Virgilis											6	2	31
Open Class
1	(Italy) Stefano Palummieri	3	2	3	1	4	1	1	1	2	2	4	DNS	230
2	(Italy) Karim Sartori	1	5†	1	2	Ret	2	DNS	2	1	1	1	NC	222
3	(Italy) Christian Caramuscia	2	1	2	4	1	3	2	3	4	4	3	1	221
4	(Italy) Matteo Immordino	4†	4	Ret	5	2	5	3	4	3	3	2	2	187
5	(Italy) Laurence Balestrini	5	3	Ret	3	3	4							85
Pos	Driver	MUG1 (Italy)		IMO (Italy)		HUN (Hungary)		RBR (Austria)		HOC (Germany)		BRN (Italy)		Pts
Pos	Driver	R1	R2	R1	R2	R1	R2	R1	R2	R1	R2	R1	R2	Pts

=== Teams' standings ===
==== F2000 Trophy ====
Pos	Team	Pts
1	(Austria) Franz Wöss Racing	210
2	(Japan) Noda Racing	209
3	(Switzerland) Jo Zeller Racing	184
4	(Italy) HT Powertrain	173
5	(Italy) Puresport	119
6	(Italy) G Motorsport	111
7	(Italy) Nannini Racing	108
8	(Italy) Team Perego	97
9	(Italy) Facondini Racing	60
10	(Italy) One Sport Performance	51
11	(Italy) Derva Corse ASD	43
12	(Italy) TVS Motorsport	38
13	(Italy) A.S.D. Ruote Scoperte M.	31
14	(Italy) PLM Racing	24
15	Racing in Italy	23
16	(Italy) Speed Motor	22
17	(France) Sud Motorsport	22
18	(Italy) Bellspeed	21
19	(Germany) Rennsport Wachter	20
20	(Italy) Emotion Motorsport	20
21	(Italy) Twister Italia	16
22	(Italy) Viola Formula Racing	15
23	(Italy) Team Tramonti Corse	15
24	(Italy) Padoviani Corse ASD	15
25	(Italy) Team Automobile Tricolore	15
26	(Italy) Antonino Racing	13
27	(Italy) Neri Autosport	13
28	(Italy) BMG Racing	10
29	(Italy) Living KC	10
30	(Italy) Valdelsa CLA	10
31	(Italy) 2F Motorsport	6
32	(Czech Republic) Chabr Motorsport	6
33	(Serbia) NV Racing	5
34	(Italy) Valentino Racing Team	5
35	(Italy) Alpha Team Racing	5

==== F2.0 Cup ====
Pos	Team	Pts
1	(Italy) Derva Corse ASD	264
2	(Italy) PLMRACING	180
3	(Italy) Speed Motor	133
4	(Italy) A.S.D. Ruote Scoperte M.	115
5	(Italy) Viola Formula Racing	77
6	(Italy) Padoviani Corse ASD	53
7	(Italy) Valdelsa CLA	24
8	(Italy) Alpha Team Racing	19
