= 2023 Drexler-Automotive Formula Cup =

Motor racing competition

The 2023 Drexler-Automotive Formula Cup was the 42nd Austria Formula 3 Cup season and the fifth season since Drexler-Automotive took over the title sponsoring of the series.

The 2023 season was held over eight race weekends across Europe. It started in March at Mugello Circuit and concluded in October at the same venue. The rounds at Mugello, Imola, Red Bull Ring and Spa had joint grids with the F2000 Italian Formula Trophy.

Benjámin Berta, driving for Franz Wöss Racing, claimed the Formula 3 Cup title. Marcel Tobler, driving for Jo Zeller Racing, won the Formula 3 Trophy title. Fabio Turchetto, driving for A.S.D. Ruote Scoperte M., won the Formula Light Cup.

== Teams and drivers ==
Teams and drivers competed in either Formula 3 or the Formula Light Cup. Formula 3 entries were divided between the Cup class and the Trophy class.

=== Formula 3 Cup entries ===
| Team | No. | Driver | Car | Engine | Rounds |
|---|---|---|---|---|---|
| (Austria) Franz Wöss Racing | 1 | (Hungary) Benjamin Berta | Dallara F316 | Mercedes | All |
| (Austria) Franz Wöss Racing | 19 | (Republic of Ireland) Cian Carey | Dallara F318 | Mercedes | 6 |
| (Italy) Puresport | 8 | (Italy) Dino Rasero | Dallara 320 | Mercedes | 1–2, 4 |
| (Italy) Puresport | 12 | (Switzerland) Christof Ledermann | Dallara F309 | Volkswagen | 4–5 |
| (Italy) Puresport | 14 | (Italy) Andrea Benalli | Dallara F309 | VW Spiess | 1–2, 4–5, 8 |
| (Japan) Noda Racing | 10 | (Japan) Juju Noda | Dallara 320 | Spiess | 1–2, 4–8 |
| (Switzerland) Jo Zeller Racing | 11 | (Switzerland) Kurt Böhlen | Dallara F316 | Mercedes | 5–6, 8 |
| (Switzerland) Jo Zeller Racing | 44 | (Switzerland) Sandro Zeller | Dallara F316 | Mercedes | All |
| (Italy) One Sport Performance | 21 | (Italy) Alessandro Bracalente | Dallara F317 | Volkswagen | 1 |
| (Italy) One Sport Performance | 23 | (Italy) Marco Marotta | Dallara F312 | Volkswagen | 5 |
| (Italy) TVS Motorsport | 23 | (Italy) Enzo Stentella | Dallara 320 | Mercedes | 1–2, 4, 8 |
| (Germany) Rennsport Wachter | 24 | (Canada) Victor Smialek | Dallara F308 | Fiat | 5–6, 8 |
| (Italy) Bellspeed | 27 | (Italy) Patrick Bellezza | Dallara F300 | Fiat | 1–2, 5, 8 |
| (Italy) Team Perego | 46 | (Italy) Riccardo Perego | Dallara F317 | Volkswagen | 1–2, 4–5, 8 |
| (Hungary) Magyar Racing Team | 46 | (Hungary) Janos Magyar | Tatuus FM | Honda | 3–4, 7 |
| (Italy) HT Powertrain | 51 | (Italy) Bernardo Pellegrini | Dallara 320 | Mercedes | 1–2, 4–5, 8 |
| Racing in Italy | 75 | (Italy) Mei Shibi | Dallara F308 | Volkswagen | 4–5, 8 |
| (Italy) G Motorsport | 131 | (Italy) Francesco Galli | Dallara 320 | Mercedes | 1–2, 4–5, 8 |

=== Formula 3 Trophy entries ===
| Team | No. | Driver | Car | Engine | Rounds |
|---|---|---|---|---|---|
| (Switzerland) Jo Zeller Racing | 2 | (Switzerland) Urs Rüttimann | Dallara F306 | Volkswagen | 4–6 |
| (Switzerland) Jo Zeller Racing | 3 | (Switzerland) Marcel Tobler | Dallara F308 | Mercedes | 2, 4–6 |
| (Austria) Franz Wöss Racing | 4 | (Switzerland) Thomas Amweg | Dallara F309 | Volkswagen | 4 |
| (Austria) Franz Wöss Racing | 5 | (Switzerland) Thomas Aregger | Dallara F309 | Volkswagen | 5 |
| (Austria) Franz Wöss Racing | 5 | (Germany) Maximilian Malinowski | Dallara F309 | Volkswagen | 6 |
| (Austria) Franz Wöss Racing | 9 | (Italy) Luca Iannacone | Dallara F308 | Mercedes | 1, 3–4, 7–8 |
| (Austria) Franz Wöss Racing | 95 | (Czech Republic) Tom Beckhäuser | Dallara F309 | Volkswagen | 3 |
| (Austria) Franz Wöss Racing | 98 | (Czech Republic) Vaclav Safar | Dallara F309 | Volkswagen | 7–8 |
| (Austria) Team Hoffmann Racing | 4 | (Australia) Robert Rowe | Dallara F312 | Toyota | 5 |
| (Austria) Team Hoffmann Racing | 4 | (Germany) Danny Luderer | Dallara F312 | Toyota | 8 |
| (Austria) Team Hoffmann Racing | 26 | (Germany) André Petropolus | Dallara F316 | Opel | 6–7 |
| (Czech Republic) SAPE Motorsport | 6 | (Czech Republic) Vaclav Lausmann | Dallara F317 | Toyota | 4, 6–7 |
| (Italy) Facondini Racing | 6 | (Italy) Enrico Milani | Dallara F308 | Fiat | 2, 5 |
| (Italy) Facondini Racing | 36 | (Italy) Francesco Solfaroli | Dallara F317 | Toyota | 1–2, 5, 8 |
| (Germany) Team Speed Center | 7 | (Germany) Christian Zeller | Dallara F312 | Opel | 5 |
| (Germany) Team Speed Center | 12 | (Germany) Philipp Todtenhaupt | Dallara F317 | Toyota | 5 |
| (Germany) Team Speed Center | 180 | (France) Patrick Harmuth | Dallara F308 | Toyota | 5 |
| (Germany) Team Speed Center | 199 | (Switzerland) Thomas Zeltner | Dallara F317 | Toyota | 5 |
| (Italy) Team Tramonti Corse | 11 | (Italy) Carmine Tancredi | Dallara F308 | Toyota | 1–2 |
| (Italy) Living KC | 12 | (Italy) Umberto Vaglio | Dallara F308 | Toyota | 2, 5 |
| (Italy) Twister Italia | 13 | (Italy) Sergio Terrini | Dallara F308 | Fiat | 1–2, 4 |
| (France) Neri Autosport | 18 | (France) Jean-Luc Neri | Dallara F311 | Fiat | 8 |
| (France) Neri Autosport | 30 | (France) Sébastien Banchereau | Dallara F308 | Fiat | 8 |
| (Italy) BMG Racing | 28 | (Italy) Giorgio Berto | Dallara F308 | Fiat | 1–2 |
| (France) Sud Motorsport | 33 | (Italy) Salvatore Marinaro | Dallara F310 | Fiat | 1–2, 8 |
| (France) Sud Motorsport | 85 | (Italy) Daniele Siano | Dallara F308 | Fiat | 1 |
| (Italy) Team Automobile Tricolore | 39 | (Italy) Edoardo Bonanomi | Dallara F312 | Mercedes | 1–2, 5 |
| (Italy) Nannini Racing | 42 | (Italy) Davide Pedetti | Dallara | Toyota | 6, 8 |
| (Italy) Nannini Racing | 81 | (Italy) Marco Falci | Dallara F317 | Toyota | 1–2 |
| (Italy) Nannini Racing | 81 | (Italy) Giancarlo Pedetti | Dallara F317 | Toyota | 6, 8 |
| (Czech Republic) Chabr Motorsport | 54 | (Czech Republic) Tomáš Chabr | Dallara F308 | Mugen-Honda | 8 |
| Racing in Italy | 75 | (Israel) Mei Shibi | Dallara F314 | Toyota | 6 |
| (Italy) Emotion Motorsport | 83 | (Italy) Daniele Radrizzani | Dallara F317 | Toyota | 1–2 |
| (Republic of Ireland) VS Racing | 99 | (Republic of Ireland) Tim Buckley | Dallara F302 | Toyota | 5 |

=== Formula Light Cup entries ===
| Team | No. | Driver | Car | Engine | Rounds |
|---|---|---|---|---|---|
| (Italy) Viola Formula Racing | 2 | (Italy) Laurence Balestrini | Tatuus FR2.0 | Renault | 4 |
| (Austria) Team Hoffmann Racing | 4 | (Australia) Robert Rowe | Tatuus FR2.0 | Renault | 6 |
| (Austria) Team Hoffmann Racing | 4 | (Germany) Walter Steding | Tatuus FR2.0 | Renault | 7 |
| (Austria) Team Hoffmann Racing | 122 | (Austria) Dr. Norbert Groer | Tatuus FR2.0 | Renault | 4–8 |
| (Germany) Team Speed Center | 8 | (Germany) Dennis Hübl | Tatuus FR2.0 | Renault | 6 |
| (Germany) Andreas Stamann | 32 | (Germany) Andreas Stamann | Tatuus FR2.0 | Renault | 5 |
| (Italy) PLMRACING | 29 | (Italy) Stefano Palummieri | Tatuus FR2.0 | Renault | 4, 8 |
| (Italy) A.S.D. Ruote Scoperte M. | 34 | (Italy) Sergio Conti | Tatuus F4-T014 | Abarth | 5, 8 |
| (Italy) A.S.D. Ruote Scoperte M. | 79 | (Italy) Fabio Turchetto | Tatuus FR2.0 | Renault | 1–2, 4, 8 |
| (Italy) Padoviani Corse ASD | 89 | (Italy) Simone Padoviani | Tatuus FR2.0 | Renault | 2, 8 |
| (Austria) Franz Wöss Racing | 125 | (United States) Robert Siska | Tatuus FR2.0 | Renault | 2–3, 7 |
| (Germany) Schwarze-Motorsport | 163 | (Germany) Falk Schwarze | Tatuus FR2.0 | Renault | 7 |
| (Switzerland) Jo Zeller Racing | 717 | (Switzerland) Stephan Glaser | Tatuus FR2.0 | Renault | 7–8 |

== Race calendar ==
The championship did not return to Vallelunga, but instead returned to Spa-Francorchamps after not visiting the circuit in 2022.

| R. | RN | Circuit | Date | Support bill | Map of circuit locations |
|---|---|---|---|---|---|
| 1 | 1 | (Italy) Mugello Circuit, Scarperia e San Piero | 25 March | F2000 Italian Formula Trophy; 24H Series (12 Hours of Mugello) | 2023 Drexler-Automotive Formula Cup is located in Europe |
| 1 | 2 | (Italy) Mugello Circuit, Scarperia e San Piero | 25 March | F2000 Italian Formula Trophy; 24H Series (12 Hours of Mugello) | 2023 Drexler-Automotive Formula Cup is located in Europe |
| 2 | 1 | (Italy) Autodromo Enzo e Dino Ferrari, Imola | 22 April | TCR Italian Series; Formula Regional European Championship | 2023 Drexler-Automotive Formula Cup is located in Europe |
| 2 | 2 | (Italy) Autodromo Enzo e Dino Ferrari, Imola | 23 April | TCR Italian Series; Formula Regional European Championship | 2023 Drexler-Automotive Formula Cup is located in Europe |
| 3 | 1 | (Hungary) Hungaroring, Mogyoród | 29 April | ESET Cup Series; TCR Eastern Europe | 2023 Drexler-Automotive Formula Cup is located in Europe |
| 3 | 2 | (Hungary) Hungaroring, Mogyoród | 30 April | ESET Cup Series; TCR Eastern Europe | 2023 Drexler-Automotive Formula Cup is located in Europe |
| 4 | 1 | (Austria) Red Bull Ring, Spielberg | 21 May | ESET Cup Series; TCR Eastern Europe | 2023 Drexler-Automotive Formula Cup is located in Europe |
| 4 | 2 | (Austria) Red Bull Ring, Spielberg | 21 May | ESET Cup Series; TCR Eastern Europe | 2023 Drexler-Automotive Formula Cup is located in Europe |
| 5 | 1 | (Belgium) Circuit de Spa-Francorchamps, Stavelot | 8 July | Spa Summer Classics; Spa 3 Hours | 2023 Drexler-Automotive Formula Cup is located in Europe |
| 5 | 2 | (Belgium) Circuit de Spa-Francorchamps, Stavelot | 9 July | Spa Summer Classics; Spa 3 Hours | 2023 Drexler-Automotive Formula Cup is located in Europe |
| 6 | 1 | (Germany) Hockenheimring, Hockenheim | 29 July | Porsche Club Historic Challenge; P9 Challenge | 2023 Drexler-Automotive Formula Cup is located in Europe |
| 6 | 2 | (Germany) Hockenheimring, Hockenheim | 29 July | Porsche Club Historic Challenge; P9 Challenge | 2023 Drexler-Automotive Formula Cup is located in Europe |
| 7 | 1 | (Czech Republic) Brno Circuit, Brno | 9 September | TCR Eastern Europe; BOSS GP Series | 2023 Drexler-Automotive Formula Cup is located in Europe |
| 7 | 2 | (Czech Republic) Brno Circuit, Brno | 10 September | TCR Eastern Europe; BOSS GP Series | 2023 Drexler-Automotive Formula Cup is located in Europe |
| 8 | 1 | (Italy) Mugello Circuit, Scarperia e San Piero | 8 October | BOSS GP Series; F2000 Italian Formula Trophy | 2023 Drexler-Automotive Formula Cup is located in Europe |
| 8 | 2 | (Italy) Mugello Circuit, Scarperia e San Piero | 8 October | BOSS GP Series; F2000 Italian Formula Trophy | 2023 Drexler-Automotive Formula Cup is located in Europe |

== Race results ==
| R. | RN | Circuit | Pole position | Fastest lap | F3 Cup winner | F3 Trophy winner | Formula Light Cup winner |
|---|---|---|---|---|---|---|---|
| 1 | 1 | (Italy) Mugello Circuit | (Japan) Juju Noda | (Italy) Francesco Galli | (Hungary) Benjamin Berta | (Italy) Marco Falci | (Italy) Fabio Turchetto |
| 1 | 2 | (Italy) Mugello Circuit | (Japan) Juju Noda | (Japan) Juju Noda | (Japan) Juju Noda | (Italy) Marco Falci | (Italy) Fabio Turchetto |
| 2 | 1 | (Italy) Autodromo Enzo e Dino Ferrari | (Hungary) Benjamin Berta | (Hungary) Benjamin Berta | (Hungary) Benjamin Berta | (Italy) Edoardo Bonanomi | (Italy) Fabio Turchetto |
| 2 | 2 | (Italy) Autodromo Enzo e Dino Ferrari | (Hungary) Benjamin Berta | (Hungary) Benjamin Berta | (Hungary) Benjamin Berta | (Italy) Enrico Milani | (Italy) Fabio Turchetto |
| 3 | 1 | (Hungary) Hungaroring | (Switzerland) Sandro Zeller | (Switzerland) Sandro Zeller | (Switzerland) Sandro Zeller | (Czech Republic) Tom Beckhäuser | (United States) Robert Siska |
| 3 | 2 | (Hungary) Hungaroring | (Hungary) Benjamin Berta | (Switzerland) Sandro Zeller | (Switzerland) Sandro Zeller | (Czech Republic) Tom Beckhäuser | (United States) Robert Siska |
| 4 | 1 | (Austria) Red Bull Ring | (Hungary) Benjamin Berta | (Hungary) Benjamin Berta | (Hungary) Benjamin Berta | (Switzerland) Marcel Tobler | (Austria) Dr. Norbert Groer |
| 4 | 2 | (Austria) Red Bull Ring | (Hungary) Benjamin Berta | (Hungary) Benjamin Berta | (Hungary) Benjamin Berta | (Switzerland) Marcel Tobler | (Italy) Stefano Palummieri |
| 5 | 1 | (Belgium) Circuit de Spa-Francorchamps | (Japan) Juju Noda | (Japan) Juju Noda | (Japan) Juju Noda | (Switzerland) Marcel Tobler | (Germany) Andreas Stamann |
| 5 | 2 | (Belgium) Circuit de Spa-Francorchamps | (Japan) Juju Noda | (Japan) Juju Noda | (Japan) Juju Noda | (Switzerland) Marcel Tobler | (Austria) Dr. Norbert Groer |
| 6 | 1 | (Germany) Hockenheimring | (Japan) Juju Noda | (Hungary) Benjamin Berta | (Switzerland) Kurt Böhlen | (Switzerland) Marcel Tobler | (Germany) Dennis Hübl |
| 6 | 2 | (Germany) Hockenheimring | (Japan) Juju Noda | (Japan) Juju Noda | (Japan) Juju Noda | (Switzerland) Marcel Tobler | (Australia) Robert Rowe |
| 7 | 1 | (Czech Republic) Brno Circuit | (Japan) Juju Noda | (Japan) Juju Noda | (Japan) Juju Noda | (Czech Republic) Vaclav Safar | (Austria) Dr. Norbert Groer |
| 7 | 2 | (Czech Republic) Brno Circuit | (Japan) Juju Noda | (Japan) Juju Noda | (Japan) Juju Noda | (Czech Republic) Vaclav Safar | (Germany) Walter Steding |
| 8 | 1 | (Italy) Mugello Circuit | (Italy) Francesco Galli | (Japan) Juju Noda | (Italy) Francesco Galli | (Czech Republic) Vaclav Safar | (Italy) Stefano Palummieri |
| 8 | 2 | (Italy) Mugello Circuit | (Italy) Francesco Galli | (Japan) Juju Noda | (Japan) Juju Noda | (Czech Republic) Vaclav Safar | (Italy) Stefano Palummieri |

== Season report ==
=== First half ===
The season began in March at Mugello Circuit with a 34-car grid together with the F2000 Italian Formula Trophy. Noda Racing's Juju Noda took pole position for both races. She had to concede the win of the first race to Franz Wöss Racing's Benjamin Berta, as she finished third behind the Hungarian and Jo Zeller Racing's Sandro Zeller. She turned her luck around later in the day, to claim the win in race two, ahead of HT Powertrain's Bernardo Pellegrini and Zeller. The F3 Trophy was dominated by Nannini Racing's Marco Falci, who took both race wins. The Formula Light Cup saw only a single car entered into the races: Fabio Turchetto, driving for A.S.D. Ruote Scoperte M., therefore won both races.

The second round at Imola was also held in conjunction with the Italian F2000 series. This time, Berta was the man to beat in qualifying as he took two pole positions. He took two largely unchallenged victories to claim the championship lead. The first race had its podium completed by Pellegrini and Noda, while the latter had to fight through from the back of the grid in race two. That race saw Zeller return to the podium, ahead of Pellegrini. Team Automobile Tricolore's Edoardo Bonanomi and Facondini Racing's Enrico Milani shared the wins in the F3 Trophy class, while standings leader Falci was unable to finish both races. Three cars entered the Formula Light Cup, but Turchetto remained unbeaten.

Only eight cars were present for the third round at the Hungaroring. Zeller and Berta shared pole positions, but Zeller was the better man in both races, winning from pole position in race one and fighting past Berta to take the win in race two. Magyar Racing Team's Janos Magyar completed both podiums as the only other F3 Cup entrant, as Zeller closed up to Berta and moved past the absent Noda in the standings. Franz Wöss Racing's Tom Beckhäuser won both F3 Trophy races, ahead of his teammate Luca Iannacone. The Formula Light Cup saw a new winner, as Turchetto was absent and Franz Wöss Racing's Robert Siska won both races as the only entrant in the class.

The first half of the season ended at Spielberg. Noda was back in action, but Berta was in his best form, dominating qualifying and taking both race wins to extend his championship advantage. Noda came second in race one, but was unable to finish race two. Zeller was also right in the mix, completing the podium in race one and finishing second ahead of G Motorsport's Francesco Galli in race two. Jo Zeller Racing's Marcel Tobler swept the weekend in the F3 Trophy class, while four cars battled for Formula Light Cup honors. Team Hoffmann Racing's Dr. Norbert Groer and PLMRACING's Stefano Palummieri shared the wins, while Turchetto solidified his points lead with two podiums.

=== Second half ===
30 cars entered the event at Spa, where Noda set out to reduce her points deficit to the leader. She did so in style, claiming both pole positions and winning both races in her class. Berta minimized the damage to his championship lead with two second places, while Zeller and Galli completed the two podiums. Tobler extended his winning run to four races in the F3 Trophy class. Groer also continued his efforts to catch up to Formula Light Cup leader Turchetto, taking a win and a second place in absence of the latter. privateer entry Andreas Stamann took the other win, but did not enter race two, so Groer had to be content with half points for his win.

The sixth round at the Hockenheimring was another one without the Italian F2000, so only 16 cars entered. The weekend began in tricky wet conditions, with Noda coping the best in qualifying to claim double pole positions, before all three championship contenders had to concede race one victory to Jo Zeller Racing's Kurt Böhlen. Race two however saw the familiar trio back on top, with Noda ahead of Zeller and Berta. The F3 Trophy class still saw no different winners, with Tobler sweeping his third weekend. Groer had to take a hit in his Formula Light Cup catch-up efforts, as he was unable to start both races which were won by Speed Center's Dennis Hübl and Team Hoffmann's Robert Rowe.

Brno Circuit hosted the penultimate round, and only four cars entered the Formula 3 Cup. Berta had a chance to clinch the championship, but Noda was unbeaten all weekend to keep the fight alive. Both races saw the same podium, Noda ahead of Berta and Zeller. Tobler was absent, so his F3 Trophy winning streak ended in favor of Franz Wöss Racing's Vaclav Safar, who took victory in both races. Groer claimed another Formula Light Cup win, but only came fifth in the second race. Team Hoffmann Racing's Walter Steding won the other race. Leader Turchetto had now been absent for four weekends running, and Groer was now in striking distance to take the title.

The championship concluded right where it began, at Mugello Circuit. Noda and Berta were in close competition for the title, but had to concede the first race to Galli, with Berta coming second ahead of Noda. This three-point advantage was enough to earn Berta the championship. Noda won the second race but had no way of overhauling the Hungarian's points tally. Tobler was crowned F3 Trophy champion in absence - Safar won two more races, but Toblers six-race win streak was too much to overcome. The Formula Lighty Trophy ended in very close fashion: Palummieri won both races, but the returning leader Turchetto earned just enough points to win the title, 2.5 points ahead of Groer.

High entry fluctuation meant that only the F3 Cup had a real continuous championship fight, with the other classes either having no fight at all or a fight being decided by drivers being absent or not. Noda was the strongest driver in the second half of the season, but missing the round at Hungaroring really hurt her campaign. Zeller, who had won the title the last seven seasons running, lacked pace to keep up with the leading pair on most occasions.

== Standings ==
=== Scoring system ===
Points were awarded per class. If less than three cars entered in a class, half points were awarded for the race.

| Position | 1st | 2nd | 3rd | 4th | 5th | 6th | 7th | 8th | 9th | 10th |
| Points | 25 | 18 | 15 | 12 | 10 | 8 | 6 | 4 | 2 | 1 |

=== Drivers' championship ===
==== Formula 3 Cup Standings ====
| Pos | Driver | MUG1 (Italy) | | IMO (Italy) | | HUN (Hungary) | | RBR (Austria) | | SPA (Belgium) | | HOC (Germany) | | BRN (Czech Republic) | | MUG2 (Italy) | | Pts |
| Pos | Driver | R1 | R2 | R1 | R2 | R1 | R2 | R1 | R2 | R1 | R2 | R1 | R2 | R1 | R2 | R1 | R2 | Pts |
|---|---|---|---|---|---|---|---|---|---|---|---|---|---|---|---|---|---|---|
| 1 | (Hungary) Benjamin Berta | 1 | 5 | 1 | 1 | 2 | 2 | 1 | 1 | 2 | 2 | 3 | 3 | 2 | 2 | 2 | 3 | 306 |
| 2 | (Japan) Juju Noda | 3 | 1 | 3 | 4 | | | 2 | Ret | 1 | 1 | 4 | 1 | 1 | 1 | 3 | 1 | 262 |
| 3 | (Switzerland) Sandro Zeller | 2 | 3 | 4 | 2 | 1 | 1 | 3 | 2 | 4 | 3 | 2 | 2 | 3 | 3 | 5 | 5 | 259 |
| 4 | (Italy) Bernardo Pellegrini | 9 | 2 | 2 | 3 | | | 4 | Ret | 6 | 4 | | | | | 4 | 4 | 109 |
| 5 | (Italy) Francesco Galli | 11 | 4 | 5 | 9 | | | 8 | 3 | 5 | 7 | | | | | 1 | 2 | 102 |
| 6 | (Hungary) Janos Magyar | | | | | 3 | 3 | 7 | 6 | | | | | 4 | 4 | | | 68 |
| 7 | (Italy) Riccardo Perego | 5 | 8 | 7 | 5 | | | Ret | 4 | 9 | 9 | | | | | 7 | 7 | 58 |
| 8 | (Switzerland) Kurt Böhlen | | | | | | | | | 8 | 6 | 1 | 4 | | | 6 | Ret | 57 |
| 9 | (Italy) Andrea Benalli | 7 | 10 | 8 | 6 | | | Ret | 5 | 8 | 4 | | | | | 8 | 6 | 51 |
| 10 | (Italy) Dino Rasero | 6 | 7 | 6 | Ret | | | Ret | 7 | | | | | | | | | 28 |
| 11 | (Italy) Enzo Stentella | 8 | 9 | 10 | 8 | | | 6 | 9 | | | | | | | 10 | 8 | 26 |
| 12 | (Republic of Ireland) Cian Carey | | | | | | | | | 3 | 5 | | | | | | | 25 |
| 13 | (Italy) Alessandro Bracalente | 4 | 6 | | | | | | | | | | | | | | | 20 |
| 14 | (Italy) Mei Shibi | | | | | | | 5 | Ret | 11 | 12 | | | | | 9 | 10 | 13 |
| 15 | (Canada) Victor Smialek | | | | | | | | | 13 | 14 | Ret | 5 | | | 11 | 9 | 12 |
| 16 | (Italy) Patrick Bellezza | 10 | 11 | 9 | 7 | | | | | 12 | 11 | | | | | 12 | 11 | 9 |
| 17 | (Switzerland) Christof Ledermann | | | | | | | Ret | 8 | 14 | 13 | | | | | | | 4 |
| 18 | (Italy) Marco Marotta | | | | | | | | | 10 | 10 | | | | | | | 2 |
| Pos | Driver | R1 | R2 | R1 | R2 | R1 | R2 | R1 | R2 | R1 | R2 | R1 | R2 | R1 | R2 | R1 | R2 | Pts |
| Pos | Driver | MUG1 (Italy) | | IMO (Italy) | | HUN (Hungary) | | RBR (Austria) | | SPA (Belgium) | | HOC (Germany) | | BRN (Czech Republic) | | MUG2 (Italy) | | Pts |

- * - half points awarded as less than three cars entered the race

==== Formula 3 Trophy standings ====
| Pos | Driver | MUG1 (Italy) | | IMO (Italy) | | HUN (Hungary) | | RBR (Austria) | | SPA (Belgium) | | HOC (Germany) | | BRN (Czech Republic) | | MUG2 (Italy) | | Pts |
| Pos | Driver | R1 | R2 | R1 | R2 | R1 | R2 | R1 | R2 | R1 | R2 | R1 | R2 | R1 | R2 | R1 | R2 | Pts |
|---|---|---|---|---|---|---|---|---|---|---|---|---|---|---|---|---|---|---|
| 1 | (Switzerland) Marcel Tobler | | | Ret | Ret | | | 1 | 1 | 1 | 1 | 1 | 1 | | | | | 150 |
| 2 | (Czech Republic) Vaclav Safar | | | | | | | | | | | | | 1 | 1 | 1 | 1 | 100 |
| 3 | (Italy) Francesco Solfaroli | 9 | 2 | 3 | 4 | | | | | 3 | 3 | | | | | 6 | 4 | 97 |
| 4 | (Italy) Luca Iannacone | 5 | 8 | | | 2* | 2* | 5 | 4 | | | | | 3 | 3 | 9 | 8 | 90 |
| 5 | (Italy) Edoardo Bonanomi | 7 | 4 | 1 | 2 | | | | | 5 | Ret | | | | | | | 69 |
| 6 | (Germany) André Petropolus | | | | | | | | | | | 3 | 5 | 2 | 2 | | | 61 |
| 7 | (Switzerland) Urs Rüttimann | | | | | | | 3 | Ret | 4 | 4 | 6 | 3 | | | | | 60 |
| 8 | (Italy) Marco Falci | 1 | 1 | Ret | DNS | | | | | | | | | | | | | 50 |
| 9 | (Italy) Carmine Tancredi | 3 | 7 | 4 | 3 | | | | | | | | | | | | | 48 |
| 10 | (Czech Republic) Vaclav Lausmann | | | | | | | 4 | 3 | | | Ret | 7 | Ret | 4 | | | 45 |
| 11 | (Italy) Daniele Radrizzani | 8 | 5 | 2 | 5 | | | | | | | | | | | | | 42 |
| 12 | (Italy) Enrico Milani | | | Ret | 1 | | | | | 4 | 10 | | | | | | | 38 |
| =13 | (Switzerland) Thomas Amweg | | | | | | | 2 | 2 | | | | | | | | | 36 |
| =13 | (Switzerland) Thomas Aregger | | | | | | | | | 2 | 2 | | | | | | | 36 |
| =13 | (Germany) Maximilian Malinowski | | | | | | | | | | | 2 | 2 | | | | | 36 |
| 16 | (Italy) Salvatore Marinaro | 6 | 9 | 5 | 8 | | | | | | | | | | | 4 | Ret | 36 |
| =17 | (Germany) Danny Luderer | | | | | | | | | | | | | | | 2 | 3 | 33 |
| =17 | (Italy) Davide Pedetti | | | | | | | | | | | Ret | Ret | | | 3 | 2 | 33 |
| 19 | (Italy) Giancarlo Pedetti | | | | | | | | | | | 4 | 6 | | | 8 | 6 | 32 |
| 20 | (Italy) Daniele Siano | 2 | 6 | | | | | | | | | | | | | | | 26 |
| 21 | (Italy) Umberto Vaglio | | | 6 | 6 | | | | | Ret | 5 | | | | | | | 26 |
| 22 | (Czech Republic) Tom Beckhäuser | | | | | 1* | 1* | | | | | | | | | | | 25 |
| 23 | (Italy) Giorgio Berto | 4 | 10 | 8 | 7 | | | | | | | | | | | | | 23 |
| 24 | (Italy) Sergio Terrini | 10 | 3 | 7 | DNS | | | Ret | DNS | | | | | | | | | 22 |
| 25 | (Israel) Mei Shibi | | | | | | | | | | | 5 | 4 | | | | | 22 |
| 26 | (France) Sébastien Banchereau | | | | | | | | | | | | | | | 5 | 5 | 20 |
| 27 | (Germany) Christian Zeller | | | | | | | | | 7 | 6 | | | | | | | 14 |
| 28 | (Czech Republic) Tomáš Chabr | | | | | | | | | | | | | | | 7 | 9 | 8 |
| =29 | (Switzerland) Thomas Zeltner | | | | | | | | | 10 | 7 | | | | | | | 7 |
| =29 | (France) Jean-Luc Neri | | | | | | | | | | | | | | | 10 | 7 | 7 |
| 31 | (France) Patrick Harmuth | | | | | | | | | 9 | 8 | | | | | | | 6 |
| 32 | (Republic of Ireland) Tim Buckley | | | | | | | | | 8 | Ret | | | | | | | 4 |
| 33 | (Germany) Philipp Todtenhaupt | | | | | | | | | 11 | 9 | | | | | | | 2 |
| 34 | (Australia) Robert Rowe | | | | | | | | | Ret | 11 | | | | | | | 0 |
| Pos | Driver | R1 | R2 | R1 | R2 | R1 | R2 | R1 | R2 | R1 | R2 | R1 | R2 | R1 | R2 | R1 | R2 | Pts |
| Pos | Driver | MUG1 (Italy) | | IMO (Italy) | | HUN (Hungary) | | RBR (Austria) | | SPA (Belgium) | | HOC (Germany) | | BRN (Czech Republic) | | MUG2 (Italy) | | Pts |

* - half points awarded as less than three cars entered the race

==== Formula Light Cup standings ====
| Pos | Driver | MUG1 (Italy) | | IMO (Italy) | | HUN (Hungary) | | RBR (Austria) | | SPA (Belgium) | | HOC (Germany) | | BRN (Czech Republic) | | MUG2 (Italy) | | Pts |
| Pos | Driver | R1 | R2 | R1 | R2 | R1 | R2 | R1 | R2 | R1 | R2 | R1 | R2 | R1 | R2 | R1 | R2 | Pts |
|---|---|---|---|---|---|---|---|---|---|---|---|---|---|---|---|---|---|---|
| 1 | (Italy) Fabio Turchetto | 1* | 1* | 1 | 1 | | | 3 | 2 | | | | | | | 4 | 2 | 138 |
| 2 | (Austria) Dr. Norbert Groer | | | | | | | 1 | 4 | 2 | 1* | Ret | DNS | 1 | 5 | 2 | 3 | 135.5 |
| 3 | (Italy) Stefano Palummieri | | | | | | | 4 | 1 | | | | | | | 1 | 1 | 87 |
| 4 | (United States) Robert Siska | | | 3 | 3 | 1* | 1* | | | | | | | 5 | 4 | | | 77 |
| 5 | (Italy) Simone Padoviani | | | 2 | 2 | | | | | | | | | | | 3 | 4 | 63 |
| 6 | (Germany) Walter Steding | | | | | | | | | | | | | 2 | 1 | | | 43 |
| 7 | (Italy) Sergio Conti | | | | | | | | | 3 | 2* | | | | | 5 | 6 | 42 |
| 8 | (Switzerland) Stephan Glaser | | | | | | | | | | | | | 4 | 2 | Ret | 5 | 40 |
| 9 | (Germany) Dennis Hübl | | | | | | | | | | | 1 | 2* | | | | | 34 |
| 10 | (Italy) Laurence Balestrini | | | | | | | 2 | 3 | | | | | | | | | 33 |
| 11 | (Australia) Robert Rowe | | | | | | | | | | | 2 | 1* | | | | | 30.5 |
| 12 | (Germany) Falk Schwarze | | | | | | | | | | | | | 3 | 3 | | | 30 |
| 13 | (Germany) Andreas Stamann | | | | | | | | | 1 | WD | | | | | | | 25 |
| Pos | Driver | R1 | R2 | R1 | R2 | R1 | R2 | R1 | R2 | R1 | R2 | R1 | R2 | R1 | R2 | R1 | R2 | Pts |
| Pos | Driver | MUG1 (Italy) | | IMO (Italy) | | HUN (Hungary) | | RBR (Austria) | | SPA (Belgium) | | HOC (Germany) | | BRN (Czech Republic) | | MUG2 (Italy) | | Pts |

* - half points awarded as less than three cars entered the race
