= 1941 in tennis =

This page covers all the important events in the sport of tennis in 1941. It provides the results of notable tournaments throughout the year on both the men's and women's ILTF tennis circuits.

== Australian Open ==
No event.

== French Open ==
No event.

== Wimbledon ==
No event.

== US Open ==
Category	Champion(s)	Finalist(s)	Score
Men's singles	(United States) Bobby Riggs	(United States) Frank Kovacs	5–7, 6–1, 6–3, 6–3
Women's singles	(United States) Sarah Palfrey Cooke	(United States) Pauline Betz	7–5, 6–2
Men's doubles	(United States) Jack Kramer (United States) Ted Schroeder	(United States) Wayne Sabin (United States) Gardnar Mulloy	9–7, 6–4, 6–2
Women's doubles	(United States) Sarah Palfrey Cooke (United States) Margaret Osborne	(United States) Dorothy Bundy (United States) Pauline Betz	3–6, 6–1, 6–4
Mixed doubles	(United States) Sarah Palfrey Cooke (United States) Jack Kramer	(United States) Pauline Betz (United States) Bobby Riggs	4–6, 6–4, 6–4
