= 1940 U.S. National Championships – Men's singles =

Men's singles
- 1940 U.S. National Championships

Final
- Champion: (United States) Donald McNeill
- Runner-up: (United States) Bobby Riggs
- Score: 4–6, 6–8, 6–3, 6–3, 7–5

Details
- Draw: 78
- Seeds: 10

Events
Singles	men	women
Doubles	men	women
← 1939 ·	U.S. National Championships	· 1941 →

Donald McNeill defeated Bobby Riggs 4–6, 6–8, 6–3, 6–3, 7–5 in the final to win the men's singles tennis title at the 1940 U.S. National Championships.

== Seeds ==
The seeded players are listed below. Donald McNeill is the champion; others show the round in which they were eliminated.

1. (United States) Bobby Riggs (finalist)
2. (United States) Donald McNeill (champion)
3. (United States) Francis Kovacs (quarterfinals)
4. (United States) Frank Parker (quarterfinals)
5. (United States) Joseph Hunt (semifinals)
6. (United States) Henry Prusoff (fourth round)
7. (United States) Bryan Grant (fourth round)
8. (United States) Elwood Cooke (quarterfinals)
9. (United States) Gardnar Mulloy (first round)
10. (United States) Welby Van Horn (second round)

== Draw ==
=== Key ===
- Q = Qualifier
- WC = Wild card
- LL = Lucky loser
- r = Retired

=== Final eight ===
Quarterfinals
5	(United States) Joseph Hunt	6	6	6
3	(United States) Francis Kovacs	4	1	4
(United States) Ted Schroeder	1	7	3	4
1	(United States) Bobby Riggs	6	5	6	6
(United States) Jack Kramer	1	6	3	6	6
4	(United States) Frank Parker	6	1	6	3	1
8	(United States) Elwood Cooke	7	8	4	3
2	(United States) Donald McNeill	9	6	6	6

Semifinals
5	(United States) Joseph Hunt	6	3	7	3	4
1	(United States) Bobby Riggs	4	6	5	6	6
(United States) Jack Kramer	1	7	4	3
2	(United States) Donald McNeill	6	5	6	6

Final
1	(United States) Bobby Riggs	6	8	3	3	5
2	(United States) Donald McNeill	4	6	6	6	7

=== Earlier rounds ===
==== Section 1 ====
First round

Second round
(United States) Carver	6	6	4	6
(Republic of Ireland) Lyttleton-Rogers	3	8	6	8
(United States) Bellis	1	4	6	6	6
(United States) Bowden	6	6	2	1	8
(Ecuador) Aguirre	0	1	2
(United States) Buxby	6	6	6
(United States) Ganzenmuller	1	1	6
5	(United States) Hunt	6	6	8

Third round
(Republic of Ireland) Lyttleton-Rogers	6	6	3	4	4
(United States) Bowden	4	4	6	6	6
(United States) Buxby	5	6	4	1
5	(United States) Hunt	7	3	6	6

Fourth round
(United States) Bowden	1	8	1	6
5	(United States) Hunt	6	6	6	8

==== Section 2 ====
First round

Second round
(United States) Mattmann	6	6	9
(Canada) McDiarmid	3	1	7
(United States) Paul	6	6	1	2	6
(United States) Crowther	3	4	6	6	8
(United States) Vogt	1	6	4	1
(United States) Seixas	6	1	6	6
(United States) Anderson	1	6	1	8
3	(United States) Kovacs	6	3	6	10

Third round
(United States) Mattmann	6	6	7	3	6
(United States) Crowther	3	4	9	6	3
(United States) Seixas	7	9	4	4	1
3	(United States) Kovacs	5	7	6	6	6

Fourth round
(United States) Mattmann	4	2	4
3	(United States) Kovacs	6	6	6

==== Section 3 ====
First round

Second round
(United States) Schroeder	6	6	7
(United States) Wall	3	0	5
(United States) Anderson	6	6	3	5	6
(United States) Underwood	2	3	6	7	0
(United States) Harman	1	6	5	3
(United States) Hartman	6	1	7	6
(United States) Anderson	3	3	9
7	(United States) Grant	6	6	11

Third round
(United States) Schroeder	2	6	6	6
(United States) Anderson	6	3	4	4
(United States) Hartman	1	6	1	3
7	(United States) Grant	6	4	6	6

Fourth round
(United States) Schroeder	6	6	5	8
7	(United States) Grant	4	3	7	6

==== Section 4 ====
First round
(United States) Podesta	6	6	9	4
(United States) Davenport	3	8	11	6
(United States) Shields	8	8	7	0
(United States) Guernsey	6	10	9	6
9	(United States) Mulloy	5	1	3
(United States) Surface	7	6	6
(United States) Hawley	6	3	1	0
(United States) Steele Jr.	3	6	6	6
(United States) Smith	2	1	2
(United States) Talbert	6	6	6
(United States) Mahoney	6	9	1	1	0
(United States) Sutter	1	7	6	6	6
(United States) Lubin	w/o
1	(United States) Riggs

Second round
(United States) Prochaska	1	1	3
(United States) Davenport	6	6	6
(United States) Guernsey	6	3	3	9
(United States) Surface	3	6	6	11
(United States) Steele Jr.	4	4	3
(United States) Talbert	6	6	6
(United States) Sutter	2	2	6
1	(United States) Riggs	6	6	8

Third round
(United States) Davenport	5	5	6	6
(United States) Surface	7	7	3	8
(United States) Talbert	3	4	3
1	(United States) Riggs	6	6	6

Fourth round
(United States) Surface	0	3	1
1	(United States) Riggs	6	6	6

==== Section 5 ====
First round
(United States) Decker	1	1	2
(United States) Wood	6	6	6
(United States) Price	7	1	0	1
(United States) Low	5	6	6	6
(United States) Hunt	6	6	4	6
(United States) Kramer	1	8	6	8
(United States) McGehee	1	8	1	3
(United States) Alloo	6	6	6	6
(Japan) Yamagishi	1	3	1
(United States) Amark	6	6	6
(United States) Johnson	2	6	1	3
(United States) Doeg	6	2	6	6
(United States) Froehling	6	6	2	3	3
(United States) Hall	1	1	6	6	6

Second round
(United States) Wood	6	1	8	6
(United States) Low	2	6	6	3
(United States) Kramer	6	6	6
(United States) Alloo	0	2	4
(United States) Amark	4	6	3	6	6
(United States) Doeg	6	1	6	3	3
(United States) Hall	6	3	6	7	4
6	(United States) Prusoff	1	6	0	9	6

Third round
(United States) Wood	3	3	3
(United States) Kramer	6	6	6
(United States) Amark	6	6	1	0	1
6	(United States) Prusoff	3	4	6	6	6

Fourth round
(United States) Kramer	6	8	5	6
6	(United States) Prusoff	3	6	7	3

==== Section 6 ====
First round

Second round
(Czechoslovakia) Hecht	2	6	1	6	8
(United States) Gillespie	6	3	6	3	10
(United States) Bickel	3	4	2
(United States) Bobbitt	6	6	6
(United States) Kelly
(United States) Arenberg	w/o
(Ecuador) Segura (Note: In his book Tennis Observed (1967) Bill Talbert lists the player's name as P. Maguire.)	3	1	5
4	(United States) Parker	6	6	7

Third round
(United States) Gillespie	4	6	3	6	6
(United States) Bobbitt	6	1	6	3	3
(United States) Kelly	3	1	3
4	(United States) Parker	6	6	6

Fourth round
(United States) Gillespie	2	3	8
4	(United States) Parker	6	6	10

==== Section 7 ====
First round

Second round
(United States) Bartlett	1	6	6	6
(United States) Evert	6	4	3	3
(United States) Greenberg	3	7	6	0
(United States) Olewine	6	9	0	6
(United States) Kantrowitz	1	6	6	6
(United States) Martin	6	1	1	3
(Republic of China (1912–1949)) Choy	1	3	3
8	(United States) Cooke	6	6	6

Third round
(United States) Bartlett	5	3	6
(United States) Olewine	7	6	8
(United States) Kantrowitz	3	1	3
8	(United States) Cooke	6	6	6

Fourth round
(United States) Olewine	3	1	4
8	(United States) Cooke	6	6	6

==== Section 8 ====
First round

Second round
(United States) O'Neill
(United States) Pryor	w/o
(United States) Everett	3	5	6	6	15
10	(United States) Van Horn	6	7	1	0	13
(United States) Thackara	6	2	5	6
(United States) Toley	1	6	7	8
(United States) Fishbach	1	1	1
2	(United States) McNeill	6	6	6

Third round
(United States) O'Neill	1	3	3
(United States) Everett	6	6	6
(United States) Toley	3	3	1
2	(United States) McNeill	6	6	6

Fourth round
(United States) Everett	3	3	1
2	(United States) McNeill	6	6	6
