= Newport Casino Invitational =

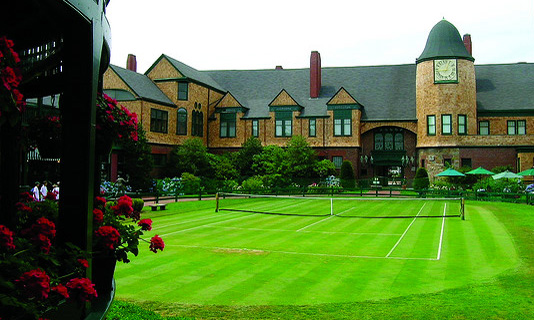

Defunct tennis tournament
- Founded: 1915
- Abolished: 1967
- Editions: 48
- Location: Newport Casino, Newport, United States
- Surface: Grass court

The Newport Casino Invitational (or Invitation) was a men's tennis tournament played on outdoor grass courts between 1915 and 1967 (Note: With the exception of the 1917–1918 and 1943–1945 editions, which were cancelled due to both World Wars.) at the Newport Casino in Newport, Rhode Island. The event was first held in 1915 when the U.S. National Championships, which had been held at the Newport Casino since 1881, moved to Forest Hills, New York. The Casino Invitational became a preparation tournament for the U.S. National Championships. Since its inception, with a field of fifty players, it consistently attracted the best of the US contingent of tennis players and many high-profile international contenders as well. With the advent of the open era in 1968 the Newport Casino Invitational ended though there were pro tournaments held at the same venue with the modified Van Alen Streamlined Scoring System (VASSS).

== Men's champions ==
| Year | Champions | Runners-up | Score |
|---|---|---|---|
| 1915 | (United States) R. Norris Williams | (United States) Maurice McLoughlin | 5–7, 6–4, 6–3, 6–3 |
| 1916 | (Japan) Ichiya Kumagae | (United States) Bill Johnston | 6–1, 9–7, 5–7, 2–6, 9–7 |
| 1917–1918 | Not Held | | |
| 1919 | (United States) Bill Tilden | (United States) Bill Johnston | 7–5, 8–6, 6–1 |
| 1920 | (United States) Clarence Griffin | (United States) Bill Johnston | 6–3, 4–6, 2–6, 6–4, 6–3 |
| 1921 | (United States) Watson Washburn | (United States) R. Norris Williams | 4–6, 6–3, 1–6, 6–2, 6–2 |
| 1922 | (United States) Bill Johnston | (United States) Hugh Kelleher | 6–1, 6–3, 6–2 |
| 1923 | (United States) Howard Kinsey | (United States) Harvey Snodgrass | 6–4, 4–6, 6–0, 9–7 |
| 1924 | (United States) Bill Johnston | (United States) Harvey Snodgrass | 6–2, 6–2, 6–2 |
| 1925 | (United States) Bill Johnston | (South Africa) Brian Norton | 6–3, 6–3, 6–3 |
| 1926 | (United States) Bill Tilden | (United States) Alfred Chapin | 3–6, 6–4, 6–0, 8–6 |
| 1927 | (United States) Bill Tilden | (Spain) Manuel Alonso | 5–7, 6–3, 9–7, 6–2 |
| 1928 | (United States) George Lott | (United States) John Van Ryn | 2–6, 6–0, 3–6, 6–2, 6–0 |
| 1929 | (United States) Bill Tilden | (United States) George Lott | 6–2, 3–6, 6–4, 5–7, 6–3 |
| 1930 | (United States) Bill Tilden | (United States) Wilmer Allison | 6–1, 0–6, 5–7, 6–2, 6–4 |
| 1931 | (United States) Ellsworth Vines | (United Kingdom) Fred Perry | 6–2, 6–4, 6–8, 6–2 |
| 1932 | (United States) Ellsworth Vines | (United States) Wilmer Allison | 6–4, 6–3, 6–3 |
| 1933 | (United States) Frank Shields | (United States) Wilmer Allison | 1–6, 11–9, 6–1, 6–3 |
| 1934 | (United States) Wilmer Allison | (United States) Frank Parker | 6–1, 6–4, 4–6, 7–5 |
| 1935 | (United States) Don Budge | (United States) Frank Shields | 6–3, 5–7, 2–6, 8–6, 6–1 |
| 1936 | (United States) Bobby Riggs | (United States) Frank Parker | 8–6, 6–4, 8–10, 3–6, 6–1 |
| 1937 | (United States) Don Budge | (United States) Bobby Riggs | 6–4, 6–8, 6–1, 6–2 |
| 1938 | (United States) Don Budge | (United States) Sidney Wood | 6–3, 6–3, 6–2 |
| 1939 | (United States) Elwood Cooke | (United States) Don McNeill | 8–10, 6–4, 7–5, 6–3 |
| 1940 | (United States) Don McNeill | (United States) Frank Kovacs | 9–7, 6–2, 6–4 |
| 1941 | (United States) Don McNeill | (United States) Ted Schroeder | 6–4 6–4 6–4 |
| 1942 | (United States) Bill Talbert | (United States) Ted Schroeder | 6–4, 6–3, 4–6, 3–6, 8–6 |
| 1943–1945 | Not Held | | |
| 1946 | (United States) Gardnar Mulloy | (United States) Ted Schroeder | 6–1, 2–6, 14–12, 6–3 |
| 1947 | (United States) Ted Schroeder | (United States) Bill Talbert | 4–6, 6–3, 7–5, 6–4 |
| 1948 | (United States) Bill Talbert | (United States) Harry Likas | 4–6, 6–3, 4–6, 6–4, 6–3 |
| 1949 | (United States) Pancho Gonzales | (United States) Gardnar Mulloy | 10–8, 9–11, 6–3, 6–4 |
| 1950 | (United States) Ted Schroeder | (United States) Arthur Larsen | 6–3, 7–5, 6–4 |
| 1951 | (Australia) Frank Sedgman | (Australia) Mervyn Rose | 6–3, 6–4, 6–0 |
| 1952 | (Australia) Frank Sedgman | (Australia) Ken McGregor | 6–3, 6–2, 12–14, 6–3 |
| 1953 | (United States) Tony Trabert | (United States) Vic Seixas | 5–7, 0–6, 6–4, 8–6, 6–3 |
| 1954 | (United States) Hamilton Richardson | (United States) Straight Clark | 6–3, 9–7, 12–14, 6–8, 10–8 |
| 1955 | (United States) Hamilton Richardson | (United States) Herbie Flam | 6–4, 6–2, 6–2 |
| 1956 | (Australia) Ken Rosewall | (United States) Hamilton Richardson | 6–0, 8–6, 6–2 |
| 1957 | (Australia) Malcolm Anderson | (United Kingdom) Mike Davies | 4–6, 6–1, 6–4, 1–6, 6–2 |
| 1958 | (Australia) Malcolm Anderson | (Australia) Ashley Cooper | 6–4, 7–5, 7–5 |
| 1959 | (United Kingdom) Tony Pickard | (United States) Ronald Holmberg | 5–7, 6–4, 6–1, 0–6, 6-3 |
| 1960 | (Australia) Rod Laver | (United States) Earl Buchholz | 6–1, 6–8, 6–1, 6–2 |
| 1961 | (Australia) Robert Mark | (United Kingdom) Mike Sangster | 9–7, 7–9, 6–3, 6–1 |
| 1962 | (United States) Chuck McKinley | (United States) Gene Scott | 6–4, 6–4, 6–4 |
| 1963 | (New Zealand) Ian Crookenden | (United Kingdom) Roger Taylor | 4–6, 9–11, 6–2, 6–3, 6–0 |
| 1964 | (United States) Chuck McKinley | (United States) Dennis Ralston | walkover |
| 1965 | (Australia) Roy Emerson | (Australia) Fred Stolle | 6–3, 6–4, 6–3 |
| 1966 | (United States) Dennis Ralston | (United States) Cliff Richey | 14–12, 11–9, 8–6 |
| 1967 | (Australia) William Bowrey | (Australia) Owen Davidson | 6–4, 6–2, 6–2 |
| 1968 | see Hall of Fame Tennis Championships | | |

== See also ==
- Hall of Fame Tennis Championships – professional tournament held since 1968.
