= 1941 U.S. National Championships – Men's singles =

Men's singles
- 1941 U.S. National Championships

Final
- Champion: (United States) Bobby Riggs
- Runner-up: (United States) Francis Kovacs
- Score: 8–6, 7–5, 3–6, 4–6, 6–2

Events
Singles	men	women
Doubles	men	women
- U.S. National Championships

Bobby Riggs defeated Francis Kovacs 8–6, 7–5, 3–6, 4–6, 6–2 in the final to win the men's singles tennis title at the 1941 U.S. National Championships.

== Seeds ==
The tournament used two lists of players for seeding the men's singles event; one for U.S. players and one for foreign players. Bobby Riggs is the champion; others show the round in which they were eliminated.

U.S.

1. (United States) Bobby Riggs (champion)
2. (United States) Francis Kovacs (finalist)
3. (United States) Donald McNeill (semifinals)
4. (United States) Ted Schroeder (semifinals)
5. (United States) Frank Parker (quarterfinals)
6. (United States) Wayne Sabin (quarterfinals)
7. (United States) Jack Kramer (quarterfinals)
8. (United States) Gardnar Mulloy (third round)

Foreign

1. (Czechoslovakia) Ladislav Hecht (third round)
2. (Ecuador) Pancho Segura (second round)
3. (Republic of Ireland) George Lyttleton-Rogers (second round)
4. (Republic of China (1912–1949)) Choy Wai-Chuen (first round)

== Draw ==
=== Key ===
- Q = Qualifier
- WC = Wild card
- LL = Lucky loser
- r = Retired

=== Final eight ===
Quarterfinals
(United States) Bryan Grant	8	1	2	3
7	(United States) Ted Schroeder	6	6	6	6
9	(United States) Frank Parker	4	3	6	2
1	(United States) Bobby Riggs	6	6	4	6
10	(United States) Wayne Sabin	3	5	6	3
5	(United States) Donald McNeill	6	7	3	6
11	(United States) Jack Kramer	4	5	5
3	(United States) Francis Kovacs	6	7	7

Semifinals
7	(United States) Ted Schroeder	4	4	6	11	5
1	(United States) Bobby Riggs	6	6	1	9	7
5	(United States) Donald McNeill	4	2	8
3	(United States) Francis Kovacs	6	6	10

Final
1	(United States) Bobby Riggs	8	7	3	4	6
3	(United States) Francis Kovacs	6	5	6	6	2

=== Earlier rounds ===
==== Section 1 ====
First round
(United States) Johnson	2	1	5
(2)	(Ecuador) Segura	6	6	7
(United States) Gladman	5	3	3
(United States) Grant	7	6	6
(United States) Cutler	2	6	8
(United States) Crowther	6	8	10
(United States) Wood	3	6	3
12	(United States) Mulloy	6	8	6
(United States) Ganzenmuller	4	4	4
(United States) Mattmann	6	6	6
(United States) Hawley	6	4	1	6
(United States) Fishbach	3	6	6	8
(United States) Vogt	3	4	6	6	4
(United States) Patty	6	6	2	4	6
(United States) Davenport	3	6	8	1	1
7	(United States) Schroeder	6	4	6	6	6

Second round
(2)	(Ecuador) Segura	4	6	6	7	2
(United States) Grant	6	8	4	5	6
(United States) Crowther	6	3	3	1
12	(United States) Mulloy	4	6	6	6
(United States) Mattmann	6	8	6
(United States) Fishbach	1	6	2
(United States) Patty	0	3	0
7	(United States) Schroeder	6	6	6

Third round
(United States) Grant	6	6	6
12	(United States) Mulloy	3	3	2
(United States) Mattmann	4	5	2
7	(United States) Schroeder	6	7	6

Quarterfinals
(United States) Grant	8	1	2	3
7	(United States) Schroeder	6	6	6	6

==== Section 2 ====
First round
8	(Republic of China (1912–1949)) Choy	8	3	6	4
(United States) Moylan	10	6	3	6
(United States) Shields	6	4	6	6	r
(United States) Gillespie	8	6	4	6
(United States) Bobbitt	0	2	3
(United States) Alloo	6	6	6
(United States) Kerdasha	1	0	3
9	(United States) Parker	6	6	6
(United States) Everett	2	6	1	4
(United States) Amark	6	3	6	6
(United States) Batjer	2	2	0
(United States) Olewine	6	6	6
(United States) Steele Jr.	w/o
(United States) Bowden
(United States) Hippenstiel	2	4	3
1	(United States) Riggs	6	6	6

Second round
(United States) Moylan	5	6	4	7
(United States) Gillespie	7	4	6	9
(United States) Alloo	2	4	1
9	(United States) Parker	6	6	6
(United States) Amark	1	6	8	5
(United States) Olewine	6	4	10	7
(United States) Bowden	1	3	2
1	(United States) Riggs	6	6	6

Third round
(United States) Gillespie	7	1	3	5
9	(United States) Parker	5	6	6	7
(United States) Olewine	3	3	2
1	(United States) Riggs	6	6	6

Quarterfinals
9	(United States) Parker	4	3	6	2
1	(United States) Riggs	6	6	4	6

==== Section 3 ====
First round
(United States) Evert	4	6	0	1
2	(Czechoslovakia) Hecht	6	1	6	6
(United States) Crosby	5	5	1
(United States) Canning	7	7	6
(United States) Edward	4	5	1
(United States) Hunt	6	7	6
(United States) Cochell	2	0	1
10	(United States) Sabin	6	6	6
(United States) Paul	3	2	5
(United States) Podesta	6	6	7
(United States) Hall	3	6	2	3
(United States) Greenberg	6	3	6	6
(United States) Umstaedter	2	2	5
(United States) Toley	6	6	7
(United States) Pryor	3	4	4
5	(United States) McNeill	6	6	6

Second round
2	(Czechoslovakia) Hecht	6	6	6
(United States) Canning	4	2	1
(United States) Hunt	3	2	4
10	(United States) Sabin	6	6	6
(United States) Podesta	1	2	3
(United States) Greenberg	6	6	6
(United States) Toley	3	5	4
5	(United States) McNeill	6	7	6

Third round
2	(Czechoslovakia) Hecht	5	1	8	2
10	(United States) Sabin	7	6	6	6
(United States) Greenberg	4	4	6	3
5	(United States) McNeill	6	6	3	6

Quarterfinals
10	(United States) Sabin	3	5	6	3
5	(United States) McNeill	6	7	3	6

==== Section 4 ====
First round
(United States) Chambers	3	2	6	1
6	(Republic of Ireland) Lyttleton-Rogers	6	6	1	6
(United States) Krieger	2	1	2
(United States) Mako	6	6	6
(United States) Lapman	0	0	1
(United States) Talbert	6	6	6
(United States) Larned	w/o
11	(United States) Kramer
(United States) Martin	8	6	1	4	5
(United States) Marx	6	3	6	6	7
(United States) Driver	2	4	2
(United States) Seixas	6	6	6
(United States) Russell	6	3	6	1	r
(United States) Hart	4	6	4	2
(United States) Welsh	3	6	1	5
3	(United States) Kovacs'	6	4	6	7

Second round
6	(Republic of Ireland) Lyttleton-Rogers	7	2	7	5
(United States) Mako	5	6	9	7
(United States) Talbert	1	4	1
11	(United States) Kramer	6	6	6
(United States) Marx	2	7	2
(United States) Seixas	6	9	6
(United States) Hart	3	2	3
3	(United States) Kovacs	6	6	6

Third round
(United States) Mako	1	4	1
11	(United States) Kramer	6	6	6
(United States) Seixas	2	4	5
3	(United States) Kovacs	6	6	7

Quarterfinals
11	(United States) Kramer	4	5	5
3	(United States) Kovacs	6	7	7
