= 1942 in tennis =

This page covers all the important events in the sport of tennis in 1942. It provides the results of notable tournaments throughout the year on both the men's and women's ILTF tennis circuits.

== Australian Open ==
No event.

== French Open ==
No event.

== Wimbledon ==
No event.

== US Open ==
Category	Champion(s)	Finalist(s)	Score
Men's singles	(United States) Ted Schroeder	(United States) Frank Parker	8–6, 7–5, 3–6, 4–6, 6–2
Women's singles	(United States) Pauline Betz	(United States) Louise Brough	4–6, 6–1, 6–4
Men's doubles	(United States) Gardnar Mulloy (United States) Bill Talbert	(United States) Ted Schroeder (United States) Sidney Wood	9–7, 7–5, 6–1
Women's doubles	(United States) Louise Brough (United States) Margaret Osborne	(United States) Pauline Betz (United States) Doris Hart	2–6, 7–5, 6–0
Mixed doubles	(United States) Louise Brough (United States) Ted Schroeder	(United States) Patricia Todd (Argentina) Alejo Russell	3–6, 6–1, 6–4
