= 1941 U.S. National Championships (tennis) =

- Date: August 30 – September 7
- Edition: 61st
- Category: Grand Slam (ITF)
- Surface: Grass
- Location: Forest Hills, Queens; New York City, New York
- Venue: West Side Tennis Club

Champions

Men's singles
- (United States) Bobby Riggs

Women's singles
- (United States) Sarah Palfrey Cooke

Men's doubles
- (United States) Jack Kramer / (United States) Ted Schroeder

Women's doubles
- (United States) Sarah Palfrey Cooke / (United States) Margaret Osborne

Mixed doubles
- (United States) Sarah Palfrey Cooke / (United States) Jack Kramer
- U.S. National Championships

The 1941 U.S. National Championships (now known as the US Open) was a tennis tournament that took place on the outdoor grass courts at the West Side Tennis Club, Forest Hills in New York City, New York. The tournament ran from August 30 until September 7. It was the 61st staging of the U.S. National Championships and due to World War II it was the only Grand Slam tennis event of the year.

== Finals ==
=== Men's singles ===
(United States) Bobby Riggs defeated (United States) Frank Kovacs 5–7, 6–1, 6–3, 6–3

=== Women's singles ===
(United States) Sarah Palfrey Cooke defeated (United States) Pauline Betz 7–5, 6–2

=== Men's doubles ===
(United States) Jack Kramer / (United States) Ted Schroeder defeated (United States) Wayne Sabin / (United States) Gardnar Mulloy 9–7, 6–4, 6–2

=== Women's doubles ===
(United States) Sarah Palfrey Cooke / (United States) Margaret Osborne defeated (United States) Dorothy Bundy / (United States) Pauline Betz 3–6, 6–1, 6–4

=== Mixed doubles ===
(United States) Sarah Palfrey Cooke / (United States) Jack Kramer defeated (United States) Pauline Betz / (United States) Bobby Riggs 4–6, 6–4, 6–4

Preceded by 1940 U.S. National Championships	Grand Slams	Succeeded by 1942 U.S. National Championships
