= 1940 U.S. National Championships (tennis) =

- Date: September 2–9
- Edition: 60th
- Category: Grand Slam (ITF)
- Surface: Grass
- Location: Forest Hills, Queens; New York City, New York
- Venue: West Side Tennis Club

Champions

Men's singles
- (United States) Donald McNeill

Women's singles
- (United States) Alice Marble

Men's doubles
- (United States) Jack Kramer / (United States) Ted Schroeder

Women's doubles
- (United States) Sarah Palfrey Cooke / (United States) Alice Marble

Mixed doubles
- (United States) Alice Marble / (United States) Bobby Riggs
- U.S. National Championships

The 1940 U.S. National Championships (now known as the US Open) was a tennis tournament that took place on the outdoor grass courts at the West Side Tennis Club, Forest Hills in New York City, New York. The tournament ran from September 2 until September 9, 1940. It was the 60th staging of the U.S. National Championships and the second Grand Slam tennis event of the year because of the cancellation of Wimbledon and the French Championships due to World War II. Don McNeill capped an outstanding season with his win over Bobby Riggs in the finals of the men's singles. Earlier in the year McNeill won the U.S. Men's Intercollegiate Singles Championships for Kenyon College, defeating Joe Hunt of Navy. A dramatic moment occurred in this 1940 National Championships during the men's singles quarter-final match between 1943 national champion, Joe Hunt and third seeded Frank Kovacs. Kovacs had the reputation as a court clown, and early in the third set, Kovacs' antics with the gallery compelled Hunt to sit down on the baseline and refuse to play until the umpire stopped the disturbance. Hunt ignored several of Kovacs' serves, allowing them to harmlessly fly by. In short order, Kovacs also sat on his baseline and Forest Hills experienced what was called "tennis' first sit-down strike." About five minutes went by with the crowd alternately cheering and jeering. When order was restored, Hunt went on to win the match in straight sets.

== Finals ==
=== Men's singles ===
(United States) Donald McNeill defeated (United States) Bobby Riggs 4–6, 6–8, 6–3, 6–3, 7–5

=== Women's singles ===
(United States) Alice Marble defeated (United States) Helen Jacobs 6–2, 6–3

=== Men's doubles ===
(United States) Jack Kramer / (United States) Ted Schroeder defeated (United States) Gardnar Mulloy / (United States) Henry Prusoff 6–4, 8–6, 9–7

=== Women's doubles ===
(United States) Sarah Palfrey Cooke / (United States) Alice Marble defeated (United States) Dorothy Bundy / (United States) Marjorie Gladman Van Ryn 6–4, 6–4

=== Mixed doubles ===
(United States) Alice Marble / (United States) Bobby Riggs defeated (United States) Dorothy Bundy / (United States) Jack Kramer 9–7, 6–1

Preceded by 1940 Australian Championships	Grand Slams	Succeeded by 1941 U.S. National Championships
