= Pensacola Invitational (tennis) =

Defunct tennis tournament
- Tour: ILTF World Circuit
- Founded: 1938
- Abolished: 1975
- Location: Pensacola, Florida; United States
- Venue: Pensacola Country Club
- Surface: Clay

The Pensacola Invitational was a combined men's and women's USLTA/ILTF affiliated clay court tennis tournament founded in 1938. It was played in Pensacola, Florida, United States until 1975.

== History ==
The tournament was founded in December 1938. It was first played at the Pensacola Country Club, and was a sanctioned event of the Southern Lawn Tennis Association.

In 1949 the Florida Sectional Association became independent of the SLTA. In 1955 and onward this event came under the administration of the Florida Tennis Association.

The event was played up to 1941 then stopped due to World War Two. It resumed in 1948 and was discontinued in 1975.

== Finals ==
=== Men's singles ===
(incomplete roll) included.

Year	Winner	Runner-up	Score
1938	(United States) Elwood Cooke	(United States) Hal Surface	8–6, 2–6, 8–6, 4–6, 6–2
1940	(United States) Bobby Riggs	(United States) Gardnar Mulloy	3–2 sets
1941	(United States) Bobby Riggs	(United States) Frank Kovacs	6–2, 6–4, 6–3
1950	(United States) Vincent di Stefano	(United States) Donald Floyd	1–6, 7–5, 1–6, 6–4, 6–3
1956	(Brazil) Armando Vieira	(Mexico) Pancho Contreras	6–4, 7–5, 4–6, 6–3
1965	(United States) Bill Tym	(South Africa) Lex Wood	6–3, 6–2
1966	(United States) Tom Edlefsen	(United States) Ronald Holmberg	6–3, 6–3
1967	(United States) Ronald Holmberg	(Australia) Bob Brien	7–5, 6–0
1968	(United States) Armistead Neely	(Chile) Jaime Fillol	5–7, 16–14, 6–2
↓ Open Era ↓
1970	(Australia) Dick Crealy	(Australia) Bob Carmichael	6–7, 7–5, retd.
1971	(Czechoslovakia) Milan Holecek	(Socialist Federal Republic of Yugoslavia) Nikola Spear	4–6, 6–3, 6–3
1972	(United States) Gordon Smith	(United States) Jim Poling	6–1, 6–4
1973	(The Bahamas) John Antonas	(United States) Greg Hilley	7–5, 2–6, 6–4
1974	(United States) Sam Vuille	(United States) Mike Green	6–2, 2–6, 6–0
1975	(Brazil) José Schmidt	(Brazil) Ricardo Bernd	6–4, 7–6

=== Women's singles ===
(incomplete roll)

Year	Winner	Runner-up	Score
1965	(United States) Roberta Baumgardner	(United States) Alice Tym	6-3, 6-2
1966	(United States) Carol Aucamp	(United States) Donna Fales	6-4, 8-6
1967	(United States) Stephanie DeFina	(South Africa) Esme Emanuel	6–0, 7–5
1968	(United States) Linda Tuero	(United States) Stephanie De Fina	9-7 6-4
