= 1942 U.S. National Championships (tennis) =

- Date: August 27 – September 7
- Edition: 62nd
- Category: Grand Slam (ITF)
- Surface: Grass
- Location: Forest Hills, Queens; New York City, New York
- Venue: West Side Tennis Club

Champions

Men's singles
- (United States) Ted Schroeder

Women's singles
- (United States) Pauline Betz

Men's doubles
- (United States) Gardnar Mulloy / (United States) Bill Talbert

Women's doubles
- (United States) Louise Brough / (United States) Margaret Osborne

Mixed doubles
- (United States) Margaret Osborne / (United States) Ted Schroeder
- U.S. National Championships

The 1942 U.S. National Championships (now known as the US Open) was a tennis tournament that took place on the outdoor grass courts at the West Side Tennis Club, Forest Hills in New York City, New York. The tournament ran from August 27 until September 7. It was the 62nd staging of the U.S. National Championships and due to World War II it was the only Grand Slam tennis event of the year.

== Finals ==
=== Men's singles ===
(United States) Ted Schroeder defeated (United States) Frank Parker 8–6, 7–5, 3–6, 4–6, 6–2

=== Women's singles ===
(United States) Pauline Betz defeated (United States) Louise Brough 4–6, 6–1, 6–4

=== Men's doubles ===
(United States) Gardnar Mulloy / (United States) Bill Talbert defeated (United States) Ted Schroeder / (United States) Sidney Wood 9–7, 7–5, 6–1

=== Women's doubles ===
(United States) Louise Brough / (United States) Margaret Osborne defeated (United States) Pauline Betz / (United States) Doris Hart 2–6, 7–5, 6–0

=== Mixed doubles ===
(United States) Louise Brough / (United States) Ted Schroeder defeated (United States) Patricia Todd / (Argentina) Alejo Russell 3–6, 6–1, 6–4

Preceded by 1941 U.S. National Championships	Grand Slams	Succeeded by 1943 U.S. National Championships
