= Los Angeles Tennis Club =

Tennis club in California, United States

Coordinates: 34.082099°N 118.330329°W

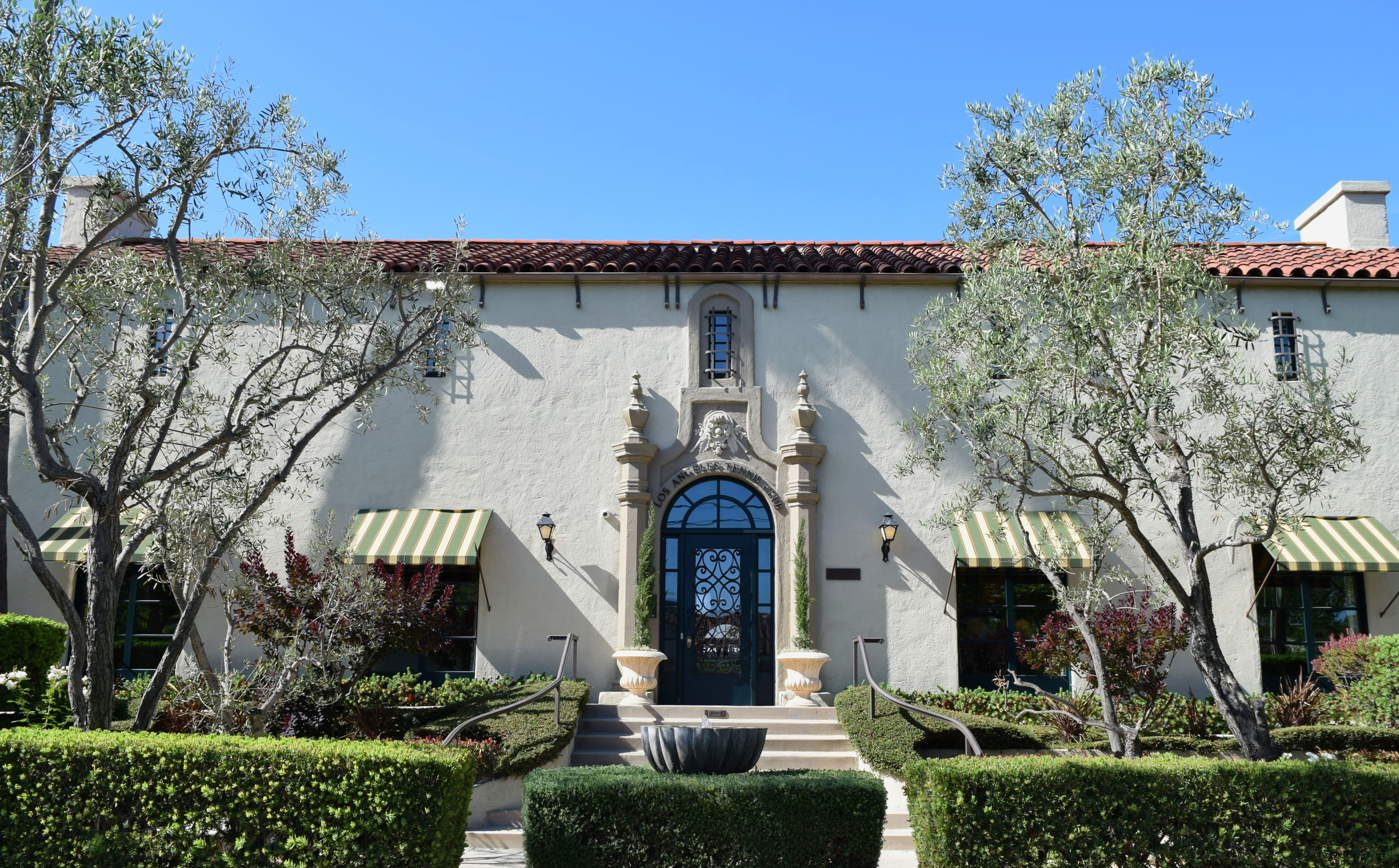
Front of the building.

The Los Angeles Tennis Club (LATC) is a private tennis club opened in 1920 that was the host of the Pacific Southwest Championships from 1927 until 1974 and 1980 until 1983. It is located at 5851 Clinton Street, between Wilcox and Rossmore, one block south of Melrose Avenue. It is currently the home of the Southern California Championships.

== History ==
The club was founded in 1920 and Thomas C. Bundy was elected as its first president.

Perry T. Jones was a major fundraiser and took control of Southern California tennis in 1930. He set up his office at the Club with his loyal Secretary, Doris Cooke, and made it famous through his junior development patrons network. It reached from Santa Barbara to San Diego and came together at the LATC to produce a steady stream of world-class tennis players. Dubbed "the cradle of tennis", Jones believed in schooling, cleanliness, proper attire, and sportsmanship when helping players develop into champions. He became Davis Cup Captain in 1958, recruited, mentored, and named Alex Olmedo to the team, that included Barry MacKay (tennis) and Ham Richardson, and won the Davis Cup from Australia that year. Jack Kramer and Pancho Gonzales acted as advisors to Jones. Jones was inducted into the International Tennis Hall of Fame in 1970. He established the Southern California Tennis Association (SCTA) Hall of Fame in 1968, and was known as "Mr. Tennis of the West Coast".

From the 1930s through the early 1970s, the LATC was the center of development for world-class players in the United States. In 1930, Perry T. Jones, became President of the Southern California Tennis Association and the Director of the Southern California Championships and Pacific Southwest Tennis Championships. Bill Tilden was the first winner of the Pacific Southwest tournament in 1927. Jones designed what he termed "The Factory System" that utilized Tennis Patrons in San Diego, Long Beach, Pasadena, Beverly Hills, and Santa Monica, such as: Harper Ink, Charles Lane, Dr. Ben Parks, Jack Lynch, Bob Martin, and Helen Roark; and Tennis Teachers: Mercer Beasley, Esther Bartosh, Ben Press, Clyde Walker, Wilbur Folsom, Dick Skeen, Pancho Segura, Carl Earn, Eleanor Tennant, Linda Crosby, Vic Braden, Myron McNamara, and Robert Lansdorp to identify and funnel top-flight junior players to his attention, so he could make them champions with funding, top competition, and tournaments, such as: Ellsworth Vines, Jack Kramer, Pancho Gonzales, Bobby Riggs, Gene Mako, Jack Tidball, Joe Hunt, Pauline Betz, Bob Falkenburg, Ted Schroeder, Budge Patty, Dodo Cheney, Herb Flam, Hugh Stewart, Pat Yeomans, Gussie Moran, Louise Brough, Maureen Connolly, Beverly Baker, Alex Olmedo, Darlene Hard, Billie Jean King, Sally Moore, Karen Hantze, Mike Franks, Bill Bond, Rafael Osuna, Dennis Ralston, Jon Douglas, Allen Fox, Stan Smith, Charlie Pasarell, Bob Lutz, and many others. Jack Kramer writes in his autobiography in 1979, that "if you wanted competition, you had to play [at the LATC] — especially since there were many fewer tournaments then and practice was the vogue." Jones was a strong-willed autocrat who excluded the young Pancho Gonzales from the Club because of his school truancy. He sometimes would not sponsor Bobby Riggs for Eastern Tournaments. He also achieved notoriety for excluding a 12-year-old Billie Jean King from a group photo at the Club, because she was wearing shorts instead of a tennis dress.

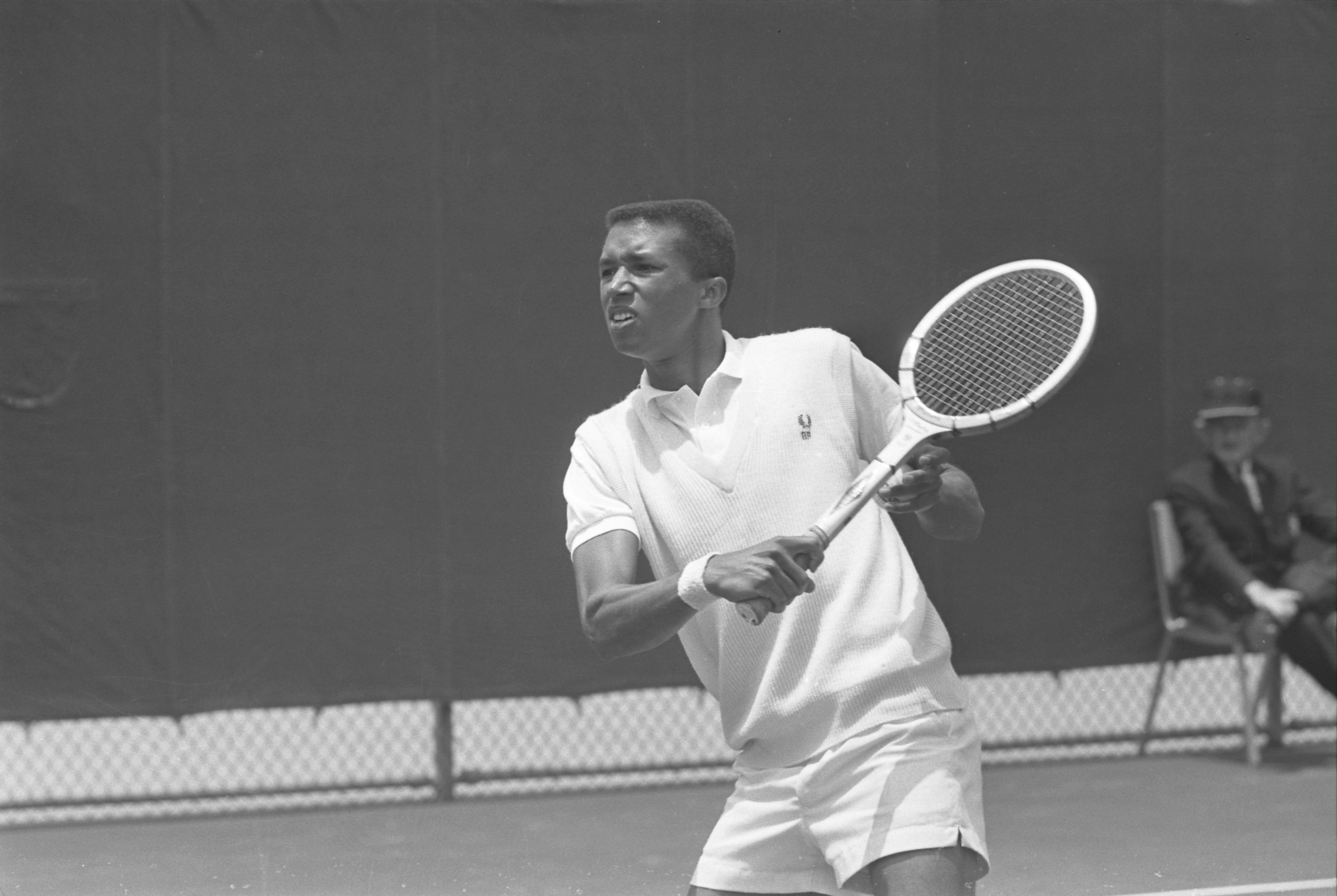
Arthur Ashe playing at the Club in 1966

In 1952, Angela Buxton, who in 1956 won competitions at Wimbledon and the French Championships, encountered anti-Semitism at the club. "They told me I couldn't play because I was Jewish," she said. She trained elsewhere, and had the opportunity to work with Bill Tilden.

When he was still a teenage player, Kramer writes, he could "get matches against" Ellsworth Vines, Bill Tilden, Bobby Riggs, "Gene Mako, Joe Hunt, Ted Schroeder, Jack Tidball, Frank Shields, and – often as not – the players on the UCLA and University of Southern California teams. George Toley won 10 NCAA Team Titles as Coach of USC, and was the Teaching Professional at the Club. Sidney Wood would come in for long periods from the East, and Frank Kovacs from Northern California." "Big Bill" Tilden, the dominant player of the 1920s and the leading gate attraction of the 1930s, was a Philadelphian, who spent much of his time in Los Angeles and at the LATC, playing matches in the morning and Bridge in the afternoon.

For five decades, the Pacific Southwest Championships, open only to amateurs until 1968, and played at the LATC, was the second most prestigious American tennis tournament after the US Championships in New York. In preparation for the 1984 Summer Olympics, Leonard Strauss, an LATC member and Chairman of Thrifty Drug Stores, spearheaded construction of a new 5,800 seat Tennis Stadium on the UCLA Campus, which then hosted Southern California's major annual professional tennis event, the Pacific Southwest.

== Today ==
The LATC remains an important tournament, recreation, and community resource for Los Angeles and its Hancock Park community. Owned by 360 equity members, the LATC provides 16 tennis courts along with pool, gym, dining, and bar facilities to its 400 members and their families and guests. The LATC continues to host several amateur, collegiate, and charity tournaments. It is a practice venue for the Loyola High and Marlborough School tennis teams.

As of 2017 the fee for new equity memberships is $25,000, not including quarterly and monthly dues, and new applicants undergo a lengthy acceptance process that can take several months and require direct approval of the Board.
