= Pennsylvania State Clay Court Open Championships =

Defunct tennis tournament
- Tour: ILTF Circuit
- Founded: 1932; 94 years ago
- Abolished: 1972; 54 years ago
- Location: Allentown, Harrisburg
- Venue: Oakmont Tennis Club (1932-43) Country Club of Harrisburg (1943-1993)
- Surface: Grass

The Pennsylvania State Clay Court Open Championships was a men's and women's grass court tennis tournament founded in 1932 as the Pennsylvania Clay Court Championships. It was staged annually Allentown then Harrisburg, Pennsylvania, United States. In 1972 it ceased to part of the official worldwide ILTF Circuit.

== History ==
On 12 September 1932 the first Pennsylvania Clay Court Championships were held at the Oakmont Tennis Club, Allentown, Pennsylvania. They remained in that location until 1943 when they were moved to the Country Club of Harrisburg. In 1972 it ceased to part of the official senior worldwide ILTF Circuit. However the tournament continued as part of the USTA Circuit until 1993 when the tournament was re branded as the Metzger Open. That tournament is still being held today as an official tournament of the Middle States Tennis Association.

== Finals ==
=== Men's singles ===
(Incomplete list)

Pennsylvania Clay Court Championships
| Year | Champions | Runners-up | Score |
| 1932 | (United States) George Lott | (United States) Berkeley Bell | 6–0, 6–0, 6–3 |
| 1933 | (United States) Gilbert Hall | (United States) Samuel Gilpin | 8–6 6–3, 6–3 |
| 1934 | (United States) Gilbert Hall | (United States) Fritz Mercur | 6–2, 6–4, 6–0 |
| 1936 | (United States) Bobby Riggs | (United States) Gilbert Hall | 6–4, 7–5, 6–3 |
| 1937 | (United States) Bernie Coghlan | (United States) Martin Buxby | 6–4, 6–4, 6–8, 6–4 |
| 1938 | (United States) Frank Guernsey | (United States) Don McNeill | 4–6, 6–3, 6–4 |
| 1946 | (Philippines) Felicisimo Ampon | (Argentina) Alejo Russell | 1–6, 3–6, 6–4, 6–2, 6–4 |
| 1958 | (United States) Howe Atwater | (United States) Jack Calkins | 6–2, 6–4, 6–2 |
| 1965 | (United States) Howe Atwater | (United States) Leif Beck | 6–4, 5–7, 6–4 |
| 1968 | (United States) John Adams | (United States) Bob Hetherington | 2–6, 6–1, 7–5 |
↓ Open era ↓
Pennsylvania State Clay Court Open Championships
| 1970 | (United States) Bell Loercher | (United States) Ed Dailey | 6–1, 6–4 |
| 1972 | (United States) Brian Marcus | (United States) Jim Maldeis | 6–2, 6–1 |

=== Women's singles ===
(Incomplete list)

Pennsylvania Clay Court Championships
| Year | Champions | Runners-up | Score |
| 1953 | (United States) Betty Moyer Smith | (United States) June Knox | 8–6, 6–1 |
| 1958 | (United States) Tory Fretz | (United States) Barbara Karlheim | 6–1, 6–2 |
| 1962 | (United States) Alice Fehrenbach | (United States) Betty Woll | 6–2, 6–0 |
| 1965 | (United States) Christine Safford Beck | (United States) Vija Vuskalns | 6–3, 6–0 |
↓ Open era ↓
Pennsylvania State Clay Court Open Championships
| 1969 | (United States) Joyce Davenport | (United States) Patti Hogan | 7–5, 7–5 |
