= Helen Bernhard =

American tennis player 1921–1998

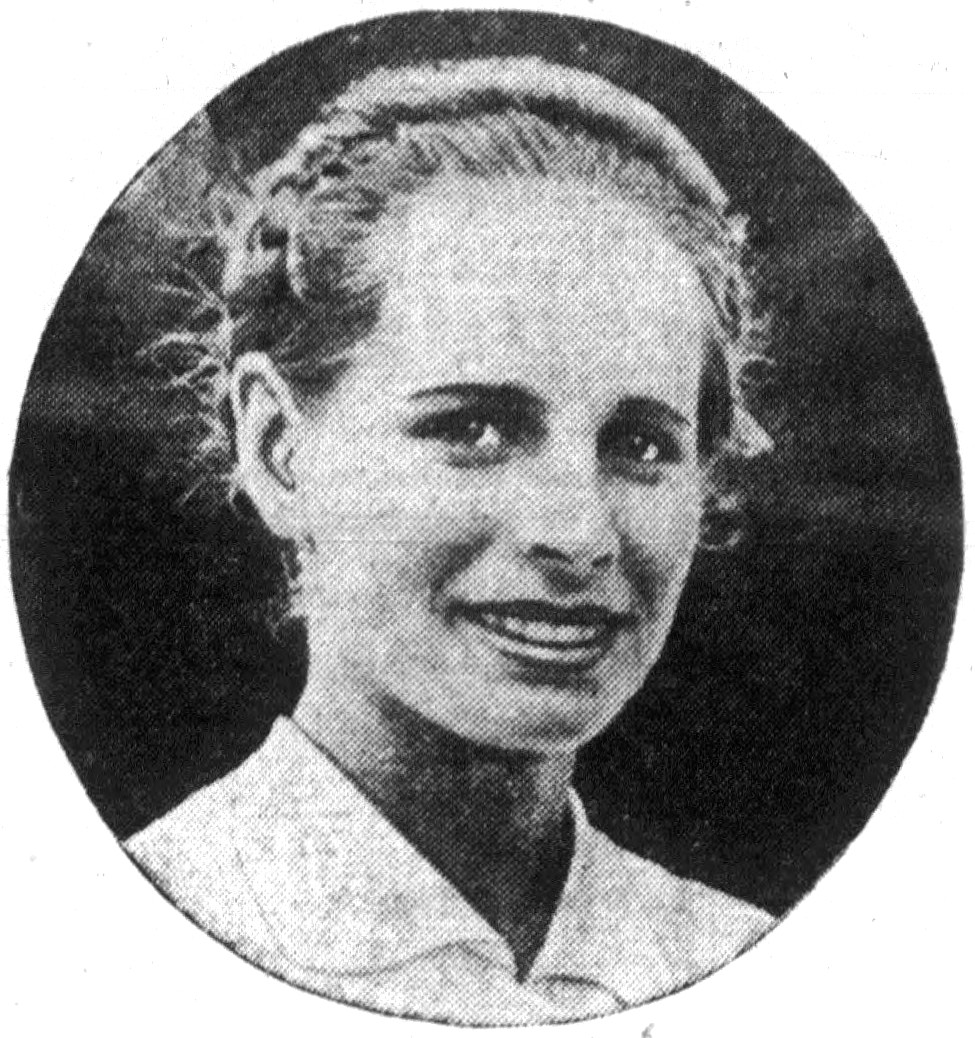
- Bernhard, circa 1941
- Full name: Helen Irene Bernhard
- Country (sports): United States
- Born: July 7, 1921; Manhattan, New York
- Died: April 19, 1998 (aged 76)
- Height: 5 ft 5 in (165 cm)

Singles

Grand Slam singles results
- US Open: SF (1942)

Doubles

Grand Slam doubles results
- US Open: QF (1941)

Helen Irene Bernhard (July 7, 1921 – April 19, 1998) was an American tennis player.

Bernhard was born in Manhattan, New York, to a Russian father and Polish mother, both war time immigrants to the United States. She attended Wadleigh High School in Harlem and was considered a significant prospect, winning back to back national junior championships in 1938 and 1939.

Only active on tour in the early 1940s, Bernhard was ranked as high as fourth in the country and made the quarter-finals or better of the U.S national championships three times. She reached the quarter-finals for the first time in 1940 after saving match points in her round three win over Margaret Osborne, before falling to Alice Marble. When she lost in the quarter-finals again in 1941 it was Osborne who beat her. Her best performance came in 1942, reaching the semi-finals with a win over Helen Rihbany. She lost her semi-final match in three sets to the top seed Louise Brough.

Bernard, a graduate of Cornell University, married Navy officer James Whiteaker in 1945. She died on April 19, 1998, aged 76.
