= Miami Invitational Tennis Championships =

Defunct tennis tournament
- Tour: ILTF World Circuit
- Founded: 1946
- Abolished: 1966
- Location: Florida; Miami; United States
- Surface: Clay / outdoor

The Miami Invitational Tennis Championships was a USLTA/ILTF affiliated clay court tennis tournament founded in 1946. Also known simply as the Miami Invitational, the event was usually played at the end January to early April depending on the scheduling by the Florida Tennis Association (FTA), in Miami, Florida, United States. The event ran annually until 1966 when it was discontinued.

== Finals ==
=== Mens singles ===
(incomplete roll)

Year	Winners	Runners-up	Score
1946	(Ecuador) Pancho Segura	(United States) Bill Talbert	6-8, 6-0, 6-1
1949	(United States) Gardner Larned	(United States) Gardnar Mulloy	7-9, 6-3, 6-4, 8-10, 7-5
1952	(United States) Vic Seixas	(United States) Dick Savitt	5-7, 6-3, 6-2
1953	(United States) Gardnar Mulloy	(United States) Hal Burrows	6-4, 6-3, 6-3
1954	(United States) Gardnar Mulloy	(United States) Art Larsen	6-2, 5-7, 6-4
1960	(United States) Donald Kierbow	(Brazil) José Edison Mandarino	7-9, 6-4, 9-7, 6-2
1962	(United States) Gardnar Mulloy	(United States) John Karabass	6-3, 6-0, 6-4
1963	(United States) Ed Rubinoff	(United States) Gardnar Mulloy	10-8, 3-6, 6-1, 6-4
1966	(United States) Bill Tym	(United States) Lowry Bell	6-2, 6-3

=== Women's singles ===
(incomplete roll)

Year	Winners	Runners-up	Score
1952	(Romania) Magda Rurac	(United States) Betty Ruth James	6-2 6-4
1954	(United States) Doris Hart	(United States) Joan Mericades	6-2, 6-2
1960	(United States) Marilyn Stock	(United States) Margaret Demogenes	0-6, 6-4, 6-4
1963	(United States) Stephanie DeFina	(United States) Carol Ann Prosen	6-3, 6-3

=== Mixed doubles ===
(incomplete roll)

Year	Winners	Runners-up	Score
1952	(United States) Tony Vincent (Romania) Magda Rurac	(United States) Bob Curtis (United States) Carla Curtis	6-4 6-1
1954	(United States) Tony Vincent (United States) Doris Hart	(Canada) Robert Bedard (Canada) Hannah Sladek	3-6, 6-2, 6-4
