= Perry T. Jones =

American tennis official (1890–1970)

Perry T. Jones (June 22, 1890 – September 16, 1970) was an amateur tennis official who was a major fundraiser for the Los Angeles Tennis Club and its tournaments. He took control of Southern California Tennis in the 1930s and ran the Pacific Southwest Championships, the second most prestigious tournament after the U.S. Championships. He became one of the most powerful officials in tennis because most of the good players were developed in Southern California. However, as the "Czar" of Southern California tennis he threw up many roadblocks in the early career of Billie Jean King.

== Life ==
Jones was born on June 22, 1890.

== Network ==
Jones set up his office at the Los Angeles Tennis Club (LATC) with his secretary, Doris Cooke, and made the Club and the Southern California Tennis Association famous through his junior development patrons network. It reached from Santa Barbara to San Diego and came together at the LATC to produce a steady stream of world-class tennis players. Dubbed "the cradle of tennis", Jones mentored men players: Ellsworth Vines, Bob Falkenburg, Jack Kramer, Pancho Gonzales, Ted Schroeder, Bobby Riggs, Mike Franks, Stan Smith, Rafael Osuna, Dennis Ralston, Arthur Ashe, Charlie Pasarell, and women players: Pauline Betz, Louise Brough, Dodo Cheney, Maureen Connolly, Billie Jean King and Karen Hantze.

== Attitude ==
Jones believed in schooling, cleanliness, proper attire, and sportsmanship when helping players develop into champions. However, many of his rules, such as requiring all white outfits, were a roadblock to poorer candidates.

== USA Davis Cup team ==
He became Davis Cup captain in 1958, recruited, mentored and named Alex Olmedo to the team, that included Barry MacKay and Ham Richardson, and won the Davis Cup from Australia that year. Jack Kramer and Pancho Gonzales acted as advisors to Jones.

== International Tennis Hall of Fame ==
Perry T. Jones was inducted into the International Tennis Hall of Fame in 1970. He established the Southern California Tennis Association (SCTA) Hall of Fame in 1968, and was known as "Mr. Tennis of the West Coast".

== Death ==
Jones died on September 16, 1970.
