= 1941 U.S. National Championships – Women's singles =

Women's singles
- 1941 U.S. National Championships

Final
- Champion: (United States) Sarah Cooke
- Runner-up: (United States) Pauline Betz
- Score: 7–5, 6–2

Details
- Draw: 62
- Seeds: 8

Events
Singles	men	women
Doubles	men	women
← 1940 ·	U.S. National Championships	· 1942 →

Second-seeded Sarah Cooke defeated first-seeded Pauline Betz 7–5, 6–2 in the final to win the women's singles tennis title at the 1941 U.S. National Championships. The tournament was played on outdoor grass courts and held from August 30, through September 7, 1941 at the West Side Tennis Club in Forest Hills, Queens, New York. The draw consisted of 62 players of which eight were seeded.

== Seeds ==
The eight seeded U.S. players are listed below. Pauline Betz is the champion; others show in brackets the round in which they were eliminated.

1. (United States) Pauline Betz (finalist)
2. (United States) Sarah Cooke (champion)
3. (United States) Dorothy Bundy (quarterfinals)
4. (United States) Helen Bernhard (quarterfinals)
5. (United States) Helen Jacobs (semifinals)
6. (United States) Margaret Osborne (semifinals)
7. (United States) Mary Arnold (third round)
8. (United States) Virginia Kovacs (first round)

== Draw ==
=== Final eight ===
Quarterfinals
2	(United States) Sarah Cooke	6	7
(United States) Hope Knowles	4	5
3	(United States) Dorothy Bundy	3	9
5	(United States) Helen Jacobs	6	11
1	(United States) Pauline Betz	6	6
(United States) Barbara Krase	1	1
4	(United States) Helen Bernhard	3	1
6	(United States) Margaret Osborne	6	6

Semifinals
2	(United States) Sarah Cooke	6	2	6
5	(United States) Helen Jacobs	3	6	1
1	(United States) Pauline Betz	6	6
6	(United States) Margaret Osborne	4	3

Finals
2	(United States) Sarah Cooke	7	6
1	(United States) Pauline Betz	5	2
