= 1942 U.S. National Championships – Women's singles =

Women's singles
- 1942 U.S. National Championships

Final
- Champion: (United States) Pauline Betz
- Runner-up: (United States) Louise Brough
- Score: 4–6, 6–1, 6–4

Events
Singles	men	women
Doubles	men	women
← 1941 ·	U.S. National Championships	· 1943 →

Second-seeded Pauline Betz defeated first-seeded Louise Brough 4–6, 6–1, 6–4 in the final to win the women's singles tennis title at the 1942 U.S. National Championships.

== Seeds ==
The eight seeded U.S. players are listed below. Sarah Palfrey Cooke is the champion; others show in brackets the round in which they were eliminated.

1. (United States) Louise Brough (finalist)
2. (United States) Pauline Betz (champion)
3. (United States) Margaret Osborne (semifinals)
4. (United States) Helen Bernhard (semifinals)
5. (United States) Mary Arnold (quarterfinals)
6. (United States) Patricia Canning Todd (second round)
7. (United States) Doris Hart (quarterfinals)
8. (United States) Helen Rihbany (quarterfinals)

== Draw ==
=== Final eight ===
Quarterfinals
1	(United States) Louise Brough	3	6	6
5	(United States) Mary Arnold	6	4	3
8	(United States) Helen Rihbany	0	4
4	(United States) Helen Bernhard	6	6
3	(United States) Margaret Osborne	7	6
7	(United States) Doris Hart	5	0
(United States) Shirley Fry	2	0
2	(United States) Pauline Betz	6	6

Semifinals
1	(United States) Louise Brough	5	6	6
4	(United States) Helen Bernhard	7	4	2
3	(United States) Margaret Osborne	4	6	5
2	(United States) Pauline Betz	6	4	7

Finals
1	(United States) Louise Brough	6	4	1
2	(United States) Pauline Betz	4	6	6
