= Wayne Sabin =

American tennis player

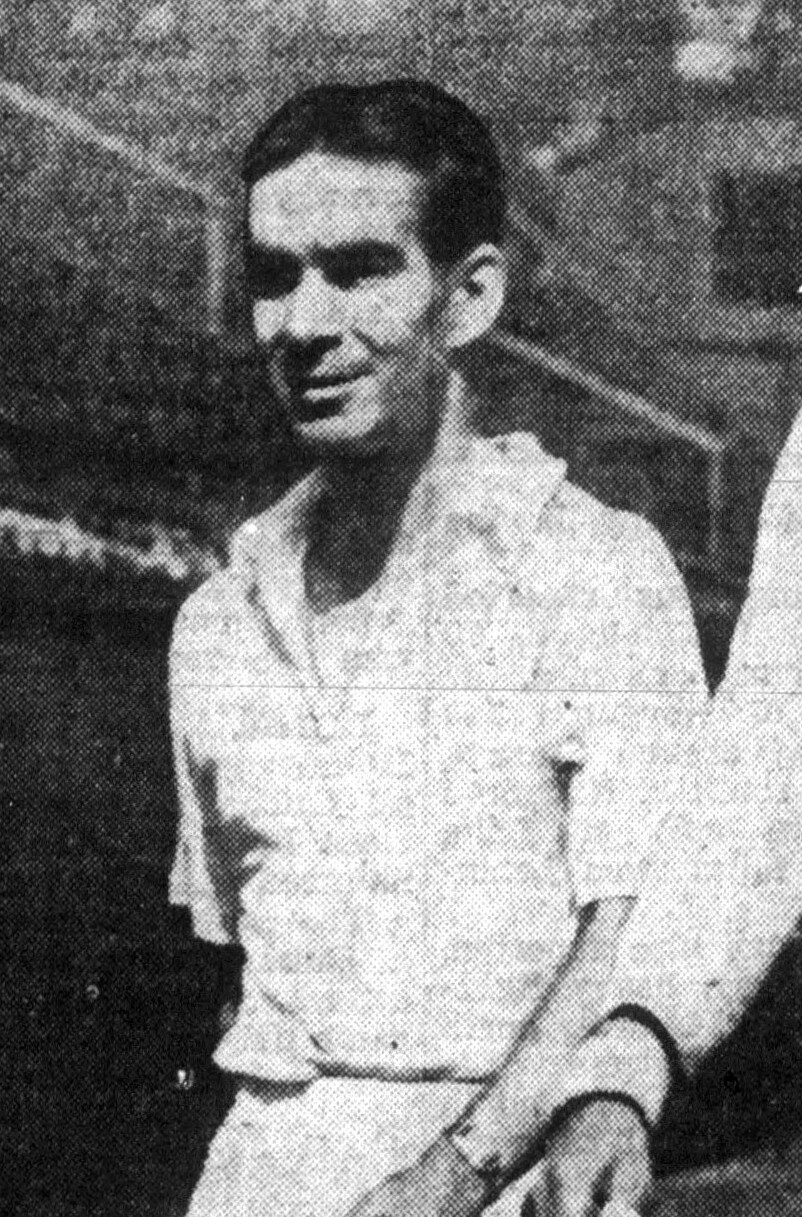
- Sabin, circa 1941
- Full name: Wayne R. Sabin
- Country (sports): United States
- Born: April 1, 1915 Des Moines, Iowa, U.S.
- Died: September 14, 1989 (aged 74) Boca Raton, Florida, U.S.
- Turned pro: 1942 (amateur from 1934)
- Retired: 1954
- Plays: Right-handed (one-handed backhand)

Singles

Grand Slam singles results
- Wimbledon: 2R (1937)
- US Open: QF (1939, 1941)

Other tournaments
- US Pro: SF (1942, 1946)

Doubles

Grand Slam doubles results
- US Open: F (1941)

Wayne Sabin (April 1, 1915 – September 14, 1989) was an American male tennis player.

He reached the final of the men's doubles competition at the U.S. National Championships (now US Open). He partnered with Gardnar Mulloy and lost the final in straight sets against Jack Kramer and Ted Schroeder. His best singles performance came in 1939 and 1941 when he reached the quarterfinals at the U.S. National Championships where he was defeated by Welby Van Horn and Don McNeill respectively.

Sabin was ranked No. 6 among the U.S. amateurs in 1937 and 1941.

In 1939 Sabin won the singles title at the National Indoors Tennis Championships, played at the Seventh Regiment Armory in New York. At the end of 1941, Sabin turned pro and in 1942 he won the Orlando Professional Championships against Keith Gledhill.

In 2009 Sabin was inducted into the USTA Pacific Northwest Hall of Fame.

== Grand Slam finals ==
=== Doubles (1 runner-up) ===
Result	Year	Championship	Surface	Partner	Opponents	Score
Loss	1941	U.S. National Championships	Grass	(United States) Gardnar Mulloy	(United States) Jack Kramer (United States) Ted Schroeder	7–9, 4–6, 2–6
