= Jimmy Evert =

American tennis player and coach

- Full name: James Andrew Evert
- Country (sports): USA
- Born: 31 July 1923 Chicago, Illinois, United States
- Died: 21 August 2015 (aged 92) Fort Lauderdale, Florida, United States
- Turned pro: 1938 (amateur tour) 1949 (pro tour)
- Retired: 1960
- Plays: Right-handed (one-handed backhand)

Singles
- Career record: 88–43
- Career titles: 3

Grand Slam singles results
- US Open: 3R (1942)
- Professional majors
- US Pro: QF (1949)

James Andrew "Jimmy" Evert (July 31, 1923 – August 21, 2015) was an American tennis coach and player. He was the father of Chris Evert, who was one of the world's top women tennis players in the 1970s and 1980s.

Evert was born in Chicago, Illinois. As a youngster, he was a two-time U.S. age-group champion. He won the 1940 Illinois state high school championship while playing for Senn High School of Chicago. After serving briefly in the United States Army, he attended the University of Notre Dame on a tennis scholarship, where he majored in economics.

In 1945, he won the Middle States Championships in Elmsford, New York against Bill Kenney. In 1947, he won the men's singles title at the Canadian International Championships in Vancouver against Emery Neale. From 1949 until the end of his career he played mainly on the pro tour, that year he reached the quarterfinals of the U.S. Pro Championships, but lost to Bobby Riggs. In 1950 he won the PLTA Spring Championships against Bill Kenney. After retiring as a player, he became a professional tennis coach.

Evert taught all five of his children at the tennis center in Fort Lauderdale, Florida, which was named in his honor in 1997. He also coached Brian Gottfried, Harold Solomon and Jennifer Capriati.

Evert died from pneumonia on August 21, 2015, in Fort Lauderdale. He was 92.
