= George Toley =

American tennis player and coach

George Andrew Toley (April 23, 1916 – March 1, 2008) was an American collegiate tennis coach at the University of Southern California from 1954 to 1980. His teams won ten NCAA team championships (1955, 1958, 1962–64, 1966–69, 1976), nine individual titles and twelve doubles titles, and included stars such as Alex Olmedo, Rafael Osuna, Dennis Ralston, Joaquín Loyo-Mayo, Raúl Ramírez, Stan Smith, Bob Lutz and Marcelo Lara.

Born in Los Angeles, Toley graduated from Los Angeles High School and attended the University of Miami before returning to his hometown and graduating from USC in 1942 with a degree in Education. He was a nationally ranked tennis player during his college years, rising as high as 7th and 10th in doubles in 1939 and 1940 with partner, Gardnar Mulloy, and 20th in singles from 1940 to 1942.

In 1941–42, Toley served for a brief time as a USC tennis coach, and also as a club pro at the Beverly Hills Tennis Club. After World War II, he became club pro at the Los Angeles Tennis Club (LATC) from 1947 to 1972. He was also an instructor at the Marlborough School from 1947 to 1970, and added the coaching position at USC in 1954 until retiring in 1980. He wrote a book on college tennis entitled "The Golden Age of College Tennis", published in 2009.

Toley was named the Intercollegiate Tennis Association National Coach of the Year for NCAA Division I men's tennis in 1978. Toley's teams at USC were highly successful, winning 82% of their dual matches (430-92-4). Toley's 1963 and 1967 teams were named the #1 and #3 greatest all-time men's teams, respectively, by Inside Tennis magazine.

In 1983, Toley was one of the 15 initial inductees to the Intercollegiate Tennis Hall of Fame (along with Olmedo, Osuna and Ralston), was elected to the Southern California Tennis Hall of Fame in 2000, and to the USC Athletic Hall of Fame in 2003. Toley died at age 91 in Pasadena, California.
