= Don McNeill (tennis) =

American tennis player

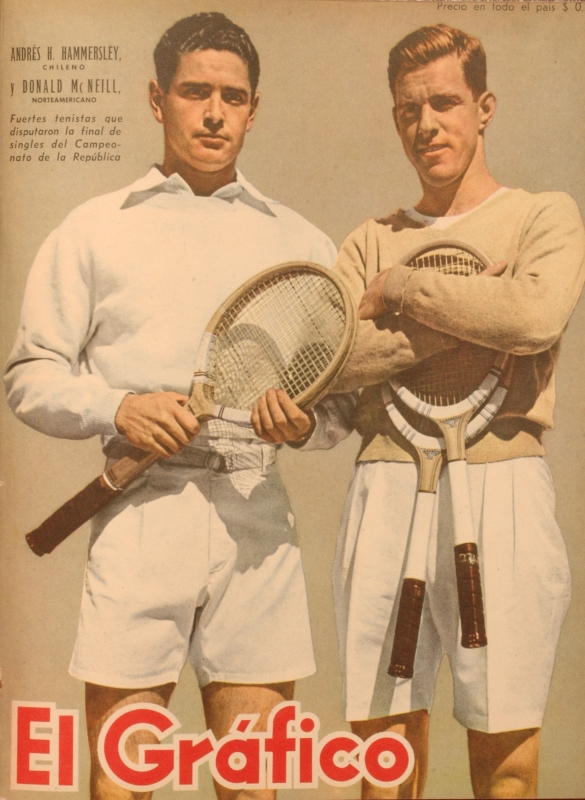
- McNeill (right) with Chilean tennis player Andrés Hammersley in 1942
- Full name: William Donald McNeill
- Country (sports): United States
- Born: April 30, 1918 Chickasha, Oklahoma, US
- Died: November 28, 1996 (aged 78) Vero Beach, Florida, US
- Height: 5 ft 10 in (1.78 m)
- Plays: Right-handed (one-handed backhand)
- College: Kenyon College
- Int. Tennis HoF: 1965 (member page)

Singles
- Career record: 315-94
- Career titles: 39
- Highest ranking: 1 (1940)(USLTA)

Grand Slam singles results
- French Open: W (1939)
- Wimbledon: 2R (1939)
- US Open: W (1940)

Doubles

Grand Slam doubles results
- French Open: W (1939)
- Wimbledon: 3R (1939)
- US Open: W (1944)

Grand Slam mixed doubles results
- US Open: F (1944)

William Donald McNeill (April 30, 1918 – November 28, 1996) was an American tennis player. He was born in Chickasha, Oklahoma, and died in Vero Beach, Florida.

== Biography ==
Don McNeill graduated from Kenyon College in 1940, where he became a member of Delta Kappa Epsilon.

McNeill won his first major title in 1938 when he defeated Frank Bowden at the U.S. National Indoor Tennis Championships, played at the Seventh Regiment Armory in Manhattan, New York.

In 1939, McNeill became the second American to win the French Championships singles title (after Don Budge) when he defeated compatriot Bobby Riggs in the final in straight sets. Afterwards he played at Wimbledon, the only time he participated, and lost to Franjo Kukuljevic in the second round of the singles, reached the third round in the doubles and the quarterfinal in the mixed doubles. He won the All England Plate, a tennis competition held at the Wimbledon Championships, which consisted of players who were defeated in the first or second rounds of the singles competition.

In June 1940, McNeill beat Bobby Riggs to win the singles title at the U.S. Men's Clay Court Championships in Chicago. In August that year he also won the Southampton Invitational tournament after a victory in the final over Frank Kovacs. His run continued two weeks later when he won the invitational tournament at the Newport Casino. In September he won his second Grand Slam title when he defeated Riggs in the final of the U.S. National Championships after being down two sets to love. It was claimed that there were several bad line calls that went against Riggs in this match. McNeill was the third player who managed to overcome a two-set deficit in the final of the U.S. Championships after Maurice McLoughlin (1912) and Bill Tilden (1922).

His title wins in 1940 earned McNeill the No. 1 ranking in the U.S. by the USLTA ahead of Riggs at No. 2 at the end of the year. There were no "official" amateur rankings during World War II - McNeill reached as high as World No. 7 in Gordon Lowe's amateur rankings list in 1939. During the war McNeill served as a lieutenant in the U.S. Navy and was attached to the embassy in Buenos Aires, Argentina. While stationed there he won the Argentinian Championships in 1942 and defended the title successfully in November 1943, defeating Pancho Segura in the final.

After the war, McNeill focused on his business career and played tournaments less frequently. In 1950, McNeill won his second U.S. Indoor title, 12 years after winning his first, defeating Fred Kovaleski in four sets. Additionally he had been a runner-up in 1940 and 1946. Both Allison Danzig, in a New York Times article in 1936, and Pancho Segura, in a telephone interview in 2014, described McNeill's game as consisting of very heavily topspun drives off both wings, and Segura was of the opinion that McNeill didn't turn pro because there was really very little money in professional tennis then.

He was elected to the International Tennis Hall of Fame in 1965.

After his tennis career, he became an advertising executive in New York. McNeill died on November 28, 1996 in Vero Beach, Florida due to complications from pneumonia.

== Grand Slam finals ==
=== Singles: (2 titles) ===
Result	Year	Championship	Surface	Opponent	Score
Win	1939	French Championships	Clay	(United States) Bobby Riggs	7–5, 6–0, 6–3
Win	1940	U.S. National Championships	Grass	(United States) Bobby Riggs	4–6, 6–8, 6–3, 6–3, 7–5

=== Doubles: 3 (2 titles, 1 runner-up) ===
Result	Year	Championship	Surface	Partner	Opponents	Score
Win	1939	French Championships	Clay	(United States) Charles Harris	(France) Jean Borotra (France) Jacques Brugnon	4–6, 6–4, 6–0, 2–6, 10–8
Win	1944	U.S. National Championships	Grass	(United States) Bob Falkenburg	(United States) Bill Talbert (United States) Pancho Segura	7–5, 6–4, 3–6, 6–1
Loss	1946	U.S. National Championships	Grass	(United States) Frank Guernsey	(United States) Gardnar Mulloy (United States) Bill Talbert	6–3, 4–6, 6–2, 3–6, 18–20

=== Mixed: (1 runner-up) ===
Result	Year	Championship	Surface	Partner	Opponents	Score
Loss	1944	U.S. National Championships	Grass	(United States) Dorothy Bundy	(United States) Margaret Osborne (United States) Bill Talbert	2–6, 3–6
