= Frank Kovacs =

American tennis player

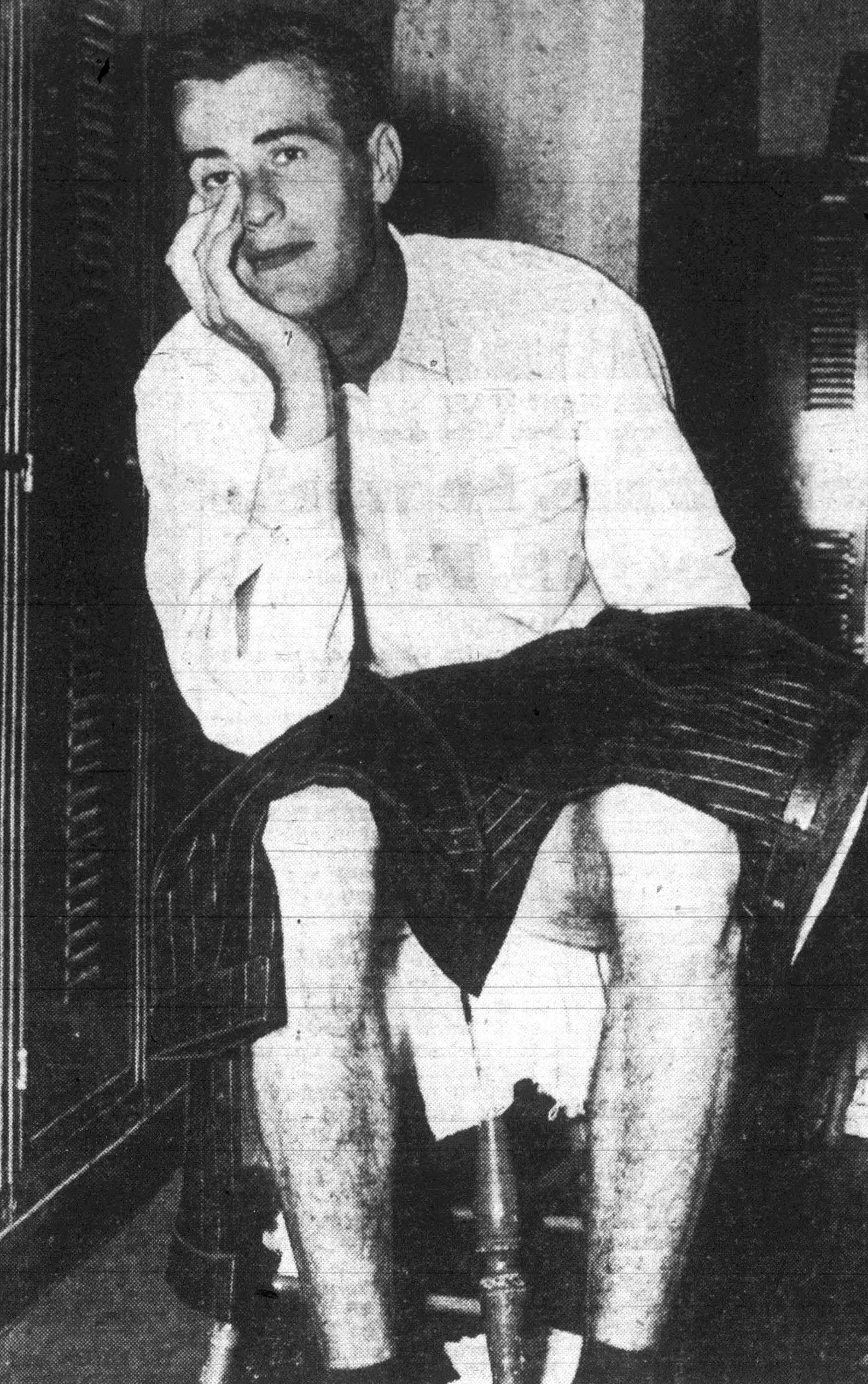
- Kovacs in 1941
- Full name: Francis Louis Kovacs II
- Country (sports): United States
- Born: December 4, 1919 Oakland, California, U.S.
- Died: February 9, 1990 (aged 70) Oakland, California, U.S.
- Height: 6 ft 4 in (1.93 m)
- Turned pro: 1941 (amateur from 1936)
- Retired: 1957
- Plays: Right-handed (one-handed backhand)

Singles
- Career titles: 42
- Highest ranking: No. 1 (1945, WPTA)

Grand Slam singles results
- US Open: F (1941)

Other tournaments
- Professional majors
- US Pro: W (1951)
- Wembley Pro: SF (1951)

Frank Kovacs (December 4, 1919 – February 9, 1990) was an American amateur and professional tennis player in the mid-20th century. He won the U.S. National Indoor Tennis Championships singles title in 1941. He won the World Professional Championships tournament in 1945 in San Francisco. Kovacs was successful on clay and won the Great Lakes Professional Clay Court Championships near Chicago in 1946, defeating Riggs in the final, and five U.S. Professional Clay Court Championships from 1948 to 1953. Kovacs won U.S. Professional Championships or International Professional Championships at Cleveland in 1951. He also won the U.S. Professional Challenge Tour in 1947 against Bobby Riggs.

Kovacs was ranked the world No. 1 professional tennis player in two different years, by the WPTA (World Professional Tennis Association) for 1945 and by the PTPA (Professional Tennis Players Association) for 1951.

== Biography ==
Kovacs' father was a Hungarian immigrant upholsterer. In his youth he had tennis lessons at the Berkeley Tennis Club. Kovacs had a reputation as an eccentric tennis player and showman on the court. Once, serving for a match point, he tossed three balls in the air - hitting the middle one for an ace. He was known to jump into the stands to applaud his opponents, and once staged a sit-down strike during a match. A newspaper article in 1940 said "Kovacs' comments as he races about the court are remindful of Bob Hope or Milton Berle before a microphone, and that these ad libs are spoken in a voice that overcomes the poor acoustics of a tennis court and are audible to everyone in the gallery." Jack Kramer writes in his autobiography that Kovacs "was a big attractive guy, with a great smile—sort of a Nastase type, only harmless, not mean." He goes on to say that during an important match against Joe Hunt "Kovacs looked up at an airplane. Hunt mimicked him, so Kovacs lay down for a clearer view, and Hunt did the same, and they were both soon lying flat out on the turf watching an airplane fly by while the fans watched them."

== Career ==
=== Amateur ===
1936

In July Kovacs reached the quarter-finals of the Oregon championships in Portland before losing to Elwood Cooke. Later in the month he lost in the quarter-finals of the Washington State championships in Seattle to Dick Bennett.

1937

In May Kovacs won the Central California championships beating Ed Amark in the final. In June Kovacs was beaten in the final of the California State Championship tournament at Berkeley. Dick Bennett of the University of California tennis team defeated him in five sets. John Murio, former California state champion, said Kovacs was better at 17 years of age than Don Budge. Murio opposed Budge, when Budge was 17, in various tournaments around California. In July Kovacs beat Walter Senior to win the Ohio championships. In July, Kovacs won the Badger State Championships beating Donald Leavens in the final. In August, Kovacs won the Port Stockton tournament beating Ed Amark in the final.

1938

In May Kovacs beat 16 year old Jack Kramer in the final to win the California State championship. In very hot conditions in the third round at the Newport Casino event in August, Kovacs faced William Murphy. Murphy won the first set and then led 3-1 lead in the second. In the fourth game, Kovacs slumped to the ground and had to be assisted to the dressing room. He lost in the third round of the 1938 U. S. National championships to Gene Mako.

1939

Kovacs beat Eddie Alloo in the final of the Northern California indoor tournament in San Francisco in February. Kovacs beat Alloo in the final to win the California State championships in May. In June, Kovacs beat Tom Brown and Nick Carter to win the Central California championships.

Kovacs was not selected by the USLTA to the U.S. Davis Cup team due to a controversy over his tennis coach and did not play in Europe. Kovacs also missed much of the season due to an arm injury or "tennis elbow". Kovacs recovered enough to play in October but lost to reigning Wimbledon and U. S. champion Bobby Riggs in the final of the Pacific Coast championships in five sets, despite leading 5-2 in the fifth set. Kovacs had missed much of the year and was not ranked for 1939.

1940

In May, Kovacs beat Welby Van Horn to win the California State Championships for the third year in a row. In June Kovacs beat Frank Parker in straight sets in the final of the Triple A tournament in St. Louis. In July, Kovacs beat Elwood Cooke in five sets in the final to win Nassau Country Club Invitation Tournament in New York. In July, Kovacs beat Seymour Greenberg to win Eastern Slopes Gold Racquet tournament in New Hampshire. In August he beat Bobby Riggs in the semifinals at Southampton before losing to Don McNeill in the final. Kovacs beat young Vic Seixas from two sets to love down in the third round of the U. S. Nationals. He lost in the quarter-finals in straight sets to Joe Hunt. In October Kovacs lost in the final of the Pacific Coast championships to Riggs. In December, Kovacs beat Bobby Riggs in the final of the Oklahoma indoor tournament. Kovacs was the No. 3 ranked American amateur by the USLTA in 1940.

1941

In January Kovacs beat Eddie Alloo in the final of the Dixie tournament in Tampa. In January, Kovacs beat Riggs in the quarter-finals of the Florida state tournament in Orlando and went on to beat Jack Kramer in the semis and Don McNeill in the final. In January, Kovacs beat Riggs in four sets to win the title at St. Petersburg, Florida. In February, Kovacs beat Riggs in the final of the University of Miami event from two sets to love down. Kovacs won the title at the U.S. National Indoor Tennis Championships in March, which was held at the Oklahoma Coliseum, after three-straight-set wins in the semifinal against Riggs and in the final against Wayne Sabin. In April, Kovacs won the River Oaks tournament in Houston beating Kramer in the semifinals and Bitsy Grant in the final. In June, Kovacs won at Orange Lawn Tennis Club, N.J. on grass, defeating Kramer in the final. In August, Kovacs won the Eastern Grasscourt Championships at the Westchester Country Club in Rye, N.Y., defeating Schroeder, McNeill, and Sabin in three-straight-set matches. Kovacs was runner-up in the U.S. National Championships at Forest Hills, beating Jack Kramer and Don McNeill before losing to top-seeded Bobby Riggs in a five-set final. Kovacs beat Riggs in the final of the Pacific Coast championships in October, allowing Riggs just five games in three sets. "I've never seen Frank play better tennis. He played brilliantly and outplayed me all the way. I have never taken a worse beating" said Riggs after the match. Kovacs won nine tournaments in 1941, defeating Riggs in five of those events. After the Pacific Coast final the Oakland Tribune reported that "it was their nineteenth encounter and Kovacs' seventh victory". Kovacs was ranked the No. 2 American amateur in 1941 by the USLTA. He was ranked the world No. 3 behind Riggs and Perry in a combined amateur-professional ranking for 1941 compiled by Ray Bowers in 2006.

Kovacs was also responsible for something of a scandal over money in tennis, which before the Open era was strictly divided into amateurs and professionals. After he was barred from amateur tennis in 1941 (leaving with a characteristic witticism - "Amateur tennis stinks - there's no money in it any more."), he talked about how money was quietly - and widely - paid to supposedly amateur players for entering tournaments.

=== Professional ===
After being evicted from the amateur ranks, Kovacs and Riggs turned professional at the same time, both signing a professional contract in November 1941 for $25,000 guarantees.

1942

From December 1941 through April 1942 the Pro tour consisted of round-robin matches between Don Budge, Bobby Riggs, Fred Perry, and Kovacs (with Gene Mako, Lester Stoefen and even Bill Tilden, for one match, as replacements for the injured Kovacs and Perry). Budge ended up with the best record, 52 wins to 18 losses, ahead of Riggs 36-36 and Kovacs, 25 wins to 26 losses. Kovacs led the early part of the tour mainly because he defeated Budge in their first five matches. Kovacs missed one month of play on this tour due to an arm injury. Kovacs was ranked world No. 3 in a combined professional-amateur ranking in February, 1942 behind Budge and Riggs.

After the tour he entered the U.S. Pro Championships at Forest Hills and reached the semifinals, losing to Riggs. As with the other great pros of the time, he then joined the U.S. Army. From 1943 to the end of WWII, Kovacs served in the army.

1943-1945

Though the tennis activity was very limited between 1943 and 1945 Kovacs defeated the players he was able to play against such as Welby Van Horn, Don McNeill, Adrian Quist, Bill Tilden, Jack Crawford, Jack Jossi, Martin Buxby, Joe Whalen, George Lott, George Lyttleton Rogers. Kovacs played matches in Australia in 1943 against Australian amateurs. At Brisbane on 28 and 29 August, Kovacs played Crawford. Kovacs won in straight sets on 28th, but lost in three sets on 29th. On 26 November at Brisbane, Kovacs beat Crawford for the loss of two games. The following day, Kovacs beat Crawford in straight sets. He beat Quist on 4 September in Sydney. In March, 1945 Kovacs won the World Professional Championships tournament in San Francisco organized by the WPTA (World Professional Tennis Association), defeating Van Horn in the final. Kovacs was ranked the world No. 1 professional tennis player for 1945 by the WPTA, ahead of 2) Van Horn 3) Budge 5) Riggs. Budge was reported to be out of condition due to military duties. Tilden ranked Kovacs as No. 2 behind Budge. YANK, The Army Weekly, stated that of the professional tennis players serving in uniform, "the best of them was Frank Kovacs".

Kovacs was recalled to military duty in July and was reported to be in hospital in August, thus missing the USPLTA U.S. Pro won by Van Horn over a depleted field.

1946

In the 1946 world professional tournament series organized by the Professional Players Association, Kovacs won the California State Pro Championship at Beverly Hills at the Beverly Wilshire Hotel on cement (defeating Perry in the final), the Southwestern Pro at Phoenix indoor (defeating Earn in the final), the Southern California Pro at Santa Barbara on cement (defeating Perry in the final), the Texas State Pro at Dallas on grass (defeating Van Horn in the final in five sets). Kovacs displayed his skill on clay, winning the Cotton State Pro in Birmingham Ala. on clay (defeating Earn in the final), the Michigan State Pro at Kalamazoo on clay (defeating Riggs in the final), and the Great Lakes Pro Championships in the Chicago area at the Knollwood Club in Lake Forest, Ill. on clay (defeating Riggs in the final in five sets). Kovacs did not play in the northeastern portion of the tournament series, and in the final point standings, Kovacs finished third behind Riggs and Budge. Of the 31 tournaments, Riggs won 14, Kovacs won 7, Perry won 4, Budge won 3, and Van Horn won 2.

1947

The World Professional Players Association was formed, led by Riggs and Budge, but disappeared before the end of the year. Kovacs lost to Riggs in the U.S. Pro Indoor semifinal at Philadelphia on wood in March. In April, Kovacs began an 11-match two-man tour with Riggs, who organized the tour, the U.S. Professional Challenge Tour. Kovacs scored six match wins against Bobby Riggs' five to win the tour, the final and deciding match of best-of-five sets being postponed until early September with the series tied at five wins each. In late April and May, Kovacs won three tournaments in New York State, at Buffalo (over Riggs in the final), at Rochester (over Earn in the final) and at Troy on canvas (over Van Horn in the final). Riggs withdrew from the quarter-finals at Rochester and Troy due to a foot problem, but it was reported that in the doubles final at Troy, Riggs "ran like a scared rabbit despite reports of an injured foot". Kovacs lost to Riggs in the U.S. Pro at Forest Hills semifinal on grass in June. On September 2, Kovacs won the decider of the U.S. Professional Challenge Tour over Riggs in three straight sets using "a devastating series of well-placed backhand shots and cannonball serves." Kovacs and Riggs both won seven matches against each other on the year. The WPPA organization disappeared before the end of the year and did not issue any official rankings.

1948

Kovacs won the North Florida Pro championships in St. Augustine in January beating Bill Lufler in the final. Kovacs won U.S. Professional Clay Court Championships at Miami in December (defeating Jimmy Evert in the final). Kovacs said in a statement after the match he renounced the title for the following reasons: "First - the tournament was not sanctioned by the Professional Lawn Tennis Association. (PLTA). Second there was not a full representative field of ranking players competing for the title. As of Jan. 1, 1949. I will participate only in PLTA sanctioned tournaments." The PLTA ranked Kovacs joint third with Budge.

1949

In January Kovacs won the U. S. Pro Clay Court Championships in St. Augustine. In the semis he beat Segura. "Kovacs had his serve working wonders and used his power". In the final he overcame Van Horn in five-sets.

1950

Kovacs won the U. S. Pro Clay Court Championships in March over Van Horn in the final, displaying an agile change of pace. In June, at the U.S. Pro Tennis Championships at the Cleveland Skating Rink on clay, Kovacs defeated Parker in the quarter-finals, losing only one game in a three-straight-set win. Parker was the reigning French champion on clay. Kovacs then defeated Riggs in four sets to reach the final. In the final, at 4-4 in the fourth set, he developed leg cramps and retired, losing to Segura, who had defeated Kramer in the other semifinal. Kovacs won the Canadian Pro Championships at Quebec City on clay in September (over Van Horn in the final). Kovacs was third in the PLTA rankings.

1951

Kovacs won the U. S. Pro Clay Court Championships in March over Earn in the final. In June Kovacs and Parker would play against each other in the semifinals of the Canadian Professional Championships at Quebec City on clay, Kovacs winning in straight sets (Kovacs lost to Segura in four sets in the final). Kovacs' greatest pro tournament result was winning the International Pro Championships or US Pro Tennis Championships (according to the PTPA) held at Lakewood on cement just outside Cleveland in June 1951. He defeated Budge in a long semifinal and Pancho Segura in the final in five sets, saving five match points against him in the fifth set before winning. Kovacs was awarded the Benrus Cup, emblematic of the U.S. Pro Championships. A week later he withdrew from the Forest Hills version of the U.S. Pro Tennis Championships (organized by Riggs and Kramer) won by Segura. Kovacs was vice-president of the PTPA, which supported the rival Cleveland event, and Riggs and Kramer did not play at Cleveland that year. In early August 1951, shortly after beginning a tour with George Lyttleton Rogers and Frank Parker, Kovacs and Lyttleton Rogers disappeared and did not play scheduled fixtures, leaving Parker on his own. Kovacs and Lyttleton Rogers were longtime friends, and Rogers was married on September 2 in California. Kovacs was ranked the world No. 1 professional tennis player for 1951 by the PTPA (Professional Tennis Players Association), ahead of Segura, Gonzales, and Kramer, in that order.

1952

In March 1952, at age 32, Kovacs defeated Pancho Gonzales in the Philadelphia Masters indoor on wood, despite losing the first eight games of the match. Kovacs lost all of his remaining matches (including his other match against Gonzales) in this round-robin event where four players played each other twice. This was Gonzales' only loss in the tournament, as he beat Kramer twice, beat Segura twice, and split the two matches with Kovacs. Kovacs was ranked the world No. 3 professional in the PTPA annual rankings for 1952 behind Segura and Gonzales. The USPLTA pro rankings for 1952 and published in Lawn Tennis & Badminton placed Kovacs at No. 3 behind Segura and Gonzales.

1953

An injured Kovacs won the U. S. Pro Clay Court Championships in January at Hollywood Beach, Fla. over Riggs in the final in three straight sets. The 1953 win over Riggs marked Kovacs' seventh U.S. national singles title.

1954

Kovacs won the 1954 Florida Pro Championships at Fort Lauderdale on clay, defeating Riggs in the final. "Kovacs' power and accurate placements to the corners, plus a number of service aces, spelled the difference in the deciding set." Kovacs was ranked fifth by the International Professional Tennis Association.

1955

In March, 1955 Kovacs defeated Nick Carter in a pro exhibition match in San Francisco in straight sets. Immediately after this match, Kovacs played in the Cleveland World Pro or U.S. Pro played that year under the VASS scoring system. Kovacs defeated Riggs to reach the semifinal where he lost a very close match to Gonzales. Two months later he played Pancho Gonzales in two matches using the VASS scoring system at the California Tennis Club in San Francisco and nearly beat him in both matches. Kovacs was ranked third in 1955 by the International Professional Tennis Association.

Later years

Kovacs continued to play in the Cleveland World Pro or U.S. Pro, the one major tournament which he had won. Ironically, the Sports Illustrated article of his 1957 appearance at Cleveland claimed that Kovacs "...has the finest collection of strokes in tennis but has never cashed in on this potential," despite the fact that Kovacs had previously won the event in 1951. Kovacs was ranked sixth for 1957 in the Jack March professional rankings, just ahead of Kramer at seventh. He spent his later years teaching tennis at the Davie Tennis Stadium in Piedmont, in Florida and at public courts near his home in Oakland.

=== Playing style and assessment ===
Kovacs won many clay events, including the Great Lakes Professional Clay Court Championships near Chicago and also five U. S. Professional Clay Court Championships. He reached two U.S. Pro finals at Cleveland, on clay in 1950 and on cement in 1951, winning the latter. Kovacs also reached the semifinals of the US Pro a further eight times. He lost five U.S. Pro semifinals at Forest Hills on grass. Kovacs did not play in the U.S. Clay Court Championships after 1938, or at Roland Garros or in Davis Cup, events where he would have been expected to achieve some success. Kovacs won a head-to-head series on an indoor surface against Riggs, with both players reportedly in excellent form throughout the matches. It was said of him that on the right days, when he was "in the zone", he could be unbeatable. Fred Hawthorne, reporter for New York Herald-Tribune who watched nearly all the early matches of the 1941-1942 pro tour thought that Kovacs at his best reached "sheer brilliancy never before excelled", but at other times Frank played "surprisingly poor tennis." Kovacs had an arm injury in that tour and missed one month of play. In his first pro match, on December 26, 1941 he defeated Don Budge, and won his first five matches against Budge on that tour.

Bowers evaluated Kovacs' playing style, "Kovacs was nearly two years younger than Riggs, of whom he was a direct opposite. Frank was rangy, about 6' 4", and served with lethal velocity. Riggs termed Frank's stroking "tremendously powerful" from both sides—often brilliant but sometimes erratic. Generally uninterested in coming to net, Frank preferred beating opponents from backcourt. Budge later said that the Kovacs backhand was the best he had ever seen. (Tilden wrote that it was second only to Budge's.)" Kovacs' net game improved during the 1940s, with a report from 1947 that "Kovacs had the losers shaking their heads by the sheer brilliance of his net game". In an assessment from July 1951, it was stated that "Kovacs, present world pro champ, gained his formidable spot through booming serves and a sound net game....", indicating that his net play had developed.

Tennis great Jack Kramer, Kovacs' near contemporary and rival, wrote: "Kovacs had picture strokes, maybe the best Backhand, but he could never win anything because he didn't have any idea how to go about winning. He never had a set plan for a match. Hell, he never had a set plan for a shot. He could sort of decide what to do with it halfway through the stroke." Kovacs' best shot, says Kramer, was "a hard, angled backhand crosscourt, but he could never figure out how to set it up so he could take advantage of it." Riggs reportedly said to Kramer one day: "...don't worry about Frankie.... He looks great, but give him long enough and he'll find some way to keep you in the match, and give him a little longer and he'll find a way to beat himself." Nevertheless, Kovacs had many notable wins over Riggs, and a very positive win–loss record against Kramer. In The Philadelphia Inquirer in March 1950, it was said Kovacs led Kramer 16-0 in their head to heads as amateurs. TennisBase states Kramer led 4-0 in their meetings as pros, all four matches played in the Philadelphia indoor tournament on wood.

== Personal life ==
Kovacs was married to San Francisco vocal coach Judy Davis in 1950 and they lived for many years in their home in the Rockridge district of Oakland, until his death on February 9, 1990. His first marriage, on July 14, 1941, was to Virginia Wolfenden, also a tennis professional; they had a son, Frank Jr.

His cousin was the entertainer Ernie Kovacs.

== Grand Slam finals ==
=== Singles (1 runner-up) ===
Result	Year	Championship	Surface	Opponent	Score
Loss	1941	U.S. Championships	Grass	(United States) Bobby Riggs	6-8, 5-7, 6-3, 6-4, 2-6

=== Pro Slam tournaments ===
==== Singles: 2 (1 title, 1 runner-up) ====
Result	Year	Championship	Surface	Opponent	Score
Loss	1950	U.S. Pro	Clay	(Ecuador) Pancho Segura	1–6, 6–1, 6–8, 4–4 ret.
Win	1951	U.S. Pro (or International Pro)	Cement	(Ecuador) Pancho Segura	6–2, 3–6, 6–3, 1–6, 9–7

== See also ==
- World number 1 ranked male tennis players
- Major professional tennis tournaments before the Open Era
