= Gardnar Mulloy =

American tennis player (1913–2016)

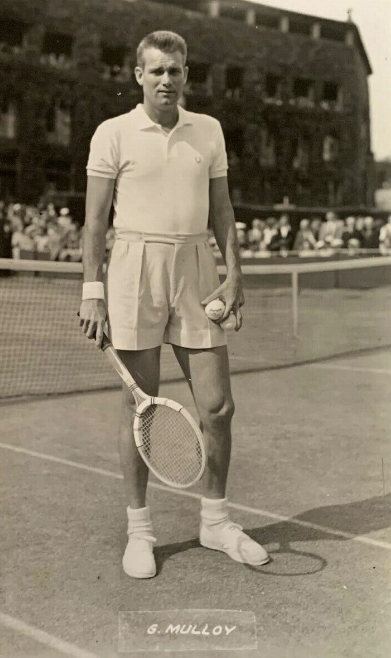
- Mulloy in 1956
- Full name: Gardnar Putnam Mulloy
- Country (sports): United States
- Born: November 22, 1913 Washington, D.C., U.S.
- Died: November 14, 2016 (aged 102) Miami, Florida, U.S.
- Height: 6 ft 1 in (1.85 m)
- Turned pro: 1934 (amateur tour)
- Retired: 1962 (as professional) c. 2006 (overall)
- Plays: Right-handed (one-handed backhand)
- College: University of Miami
- Int. Tennis HoF: 1972 (member page)

Singles
- Career record: 918–310 (74.7%)
- Career titles: 60
- Highest ranking: No. 6 (1947, Harry Hopman)

Grand Slam singles results
- Australian Open: SF (1947)
- French Open: QF (1952, 1953, 1954)
- Wimbledon: SF (1948)
- US Open: F (1952)

Doubles
- Career record: 0–8

Grand Slam doubles results
- French Open: F (1951, 1952)
- Wimbledon: W (1957)
- US Open: W (1942, 1945, 1946, 1948)

Grand Slam mixed doubles results
- Wimbledon: F (1956)
- US Open: F (1955)

Team competitions
- Davis Cup: W (1946, 1948, 1949)

Gardnar Putnam "Gar" Mulloy (November 22, 1913 – November 14, 2016) was a U.S. No. 1 tennis player primarily known for playing in doubles matches with partner Billy Talbert. He was born in Washington, D.C., and turned 100 in November 2013. During his career he won five Grand Slam doubles tournaments and was a member of the winning Davis Cup team on three occasions.

Mulloy played collegiate tennis for the Miami Hurricanes at the University of Miami in Coral Gables, Florida.

== Tennis career ==
While he was the tennis coach at the University of Miami, Mulloy recruited Pancho Segura for the tennis team. Segura won three straight NCAA singles titles in 1943, 1944, and 1945. Segura went on to enjoy a successful professional tennis career, competing against the top touring professional players from 1947 until his retirement in 1962.

Mulloy was inducted into the University of Miami Sports Hall of Fame in 1967 as part of its inaugural class of inductees.

Mulloy won the Newport Casino Championships in 1946 defeating Ted Schroeder in the final in four sets.

Mulloy reached the U.S. Championships men's singles final in 1952, losing to second-seeded Frank Sedgman in three straight sets. He reached the U.S. No. 1 ranking the same year and was ranked world No. 6 by Harry Hopman in 1947 and world No. 7 by American Lawn Tennis Magazine in 1949.

The pair of Mulloy and Talbert won the U.S. men's doubles title in 1942, 1945, 1946, and 1948. He also won the Wimbledon doubles with Budge Patty in 1957, at age 43.

Mulloy was a Davis Cup team member in 1946, 1948–1950, 1952–53 and 1957, winning the Cup on three occasions against Australia. His Davis Cup record stands at 11 wins and 3 losses. Mulloy, who served as the commanding officer of USS LST-32 during World War II in the Mediterranean Theater, was inducted into the International Tennis Hall of Fame in Newport, Rhode Island, in 1972.

In 2015 Mulloy was awarded a French Legion of Honor knighthood for his service in the US Navy in relation to operations in Italy and Provence. As such he became the oldest first time recipient of the order ever since it was created by Napoleon.

Mulloy was a 1936 graduate of the University of Miami, and tennis coach at the school. He also was a member of Lambda Chi Alpha fraternity. He recruited to Miami and played doubles with George Toley, who went on to win 10 NCAA team titles at the University of Southern California. Probably Mulloy's greatest contribution to tennis was advancing the popularity of senior tennis. He played the senior circuit around the world into his nineties, and established the Mulloy Cup for international competition between men tennis players 80 years of age and over. He won over 127 national championships and 25 international titles in 75 years of playing competitive tennis.

As of 2006, Mulloy was still participating in and winning senior matches.

Among his other career highlights he won the Miami Invitational Tennis Championships in 1954 against Art Larsen.

== Personal life ==
In 1938, Mulloy married Madeleine L. Cheney (1917–1993), with whom he had two daughters, Diane Mulloy Mazzone and Janice Mulloy Poindexter. He married his second wife, Jacqueline Mayer, in 2008, when he was 95 years old. Mulloy was a vegetarian and avoided alcohol, coffee, sugary drinks and tea.

Mulloy died in Miami on November 14, 2016, from stroke complications, aged 102, survived by his second wife, his daughters, four grandchildren, and nine great-grandchildren.

== Grand Slam finals ==
=== Singles (1 runner-up) ===
Result	Year	Championship	Surface	Opponent	Score
Loss	1952	U.S. National Championships	Grass	(Australia) Frank Sedgman	1–6, 2–6, 3–6

=== Doubles (5 titles, 9 runners-up) ===
Result	Year	Championship	Surface	Partner	Opponents	Score
Loss	1940	U.S. National Championships	Grass	(United States) Wayne Sabin	(United States) Jack Kramer (United States) Ted Schroeder	7–6, 4–6, 2–6
Loss	1941	U.S. National Championships	Grass	(United States) Henry Prusoff	(United States) Jack Kramer (United States) Ted Schroeder	4–6, 6–8, 7–9
Win	1942	U.S. National Championships	Grass	(United States) Bill Talbert	(United States) Ted Schroeder (United States) Sidney Wood	9–7, 7–5, 6–1
Win	1945	U.S. National Championships	Grass	(United States) Bill Talbert	(United States) Bob Falkenburg (United States) Jack Tuero	12–10, 8–10, 12–10, 6–2
Win	1946	U.S. National Championships	Grass	(United States) Bill Talbert	(United States) Don McNeill (United States) Frank Guernsey	3–6, 6–4, 2–6, 6–3, 20–18
Loss	1948	Wimbledon	Grass	(United States) Tom Brown	(Australia) John Bromwich (Australia) Frank Sedgman	7–5, 5–7, 5–7, 7–9
Win	1948	U.S. National Championships	Grass	(United States) Bill Talbert	(United States) Frank Parker (United States) Ted Schroeder	1–6, 9–7, 6–3, 3–6, 9–7
Loss	1949	Wimbledon	Grass	(United States) Ted Schroeder	(United States) Pancho Gonzales (United States) Frank Parker	4–6, 4–6, 2–6
Loss	1950	French Championships	Clay	(United States) Dick Savitt	(Australia) Ken McGregor (Australia) Frank Sedgman	2–6, 6–2, 7–9, 5–7
Loss	1950	U.S. National Championships	Grass	(United States) Bill Talbert	(Australia) John Bromwich (Australia) Frank Sedgman	5–7, 6–8, 6–3, 1–6
Loss	1951	French Championships	Clay	(United States) Dick Savitt	(Australia) Ken McGregor (Australia) Frank Sedgman	3–6, 4–6, 4–6
Loss	1953	U.S. National Championships	Grass	(United States) Bill Talbert	(Australia) Rex Hartwig (Australia) Mervyn Rose	4–6, 6–4, 4–6, 2–6
Win	1957	Wimbledon	Grass	(United States) Budge Patty	(Australia) Neale Fraser (Australia) Lew Hoad	8–10, 6–4, 6–4, 6–4
Loss	1957	U.S. National Championships	Grass	(United States) Budge Patty	(Australia) Ashley Cooper (Australia) Neale Fraser	6–4, 3–6, 7–9, 3–6

=== Mixed doubles (2 runner-ups) ===
Result	Year	Championship	Surface	Partner	Opponents	Score
Loss	1955	U.S. National Championships	Grass	(United States) Shirley Fry	(United States) Doris Hart (United States) Vic Seixas	5–7, 7–5, 2–6
Loss	1956	Wimbledon	Grass	(United States) Althea Gibson	(United States) Shirley Fry (United States) Vic Seixas	6–2, 2–6, 5–7

== Book ==
Mulloy wrote an autobiography, The Will To Win, that was published in 1960. In 2009, he released an update to his autobiography, titled As It Was, with an introduction by Billie Jean King. According to the book, Mulloy is enshrined in a record nine Halls of Fame.
