= Ted Schroeder =

American tennis player

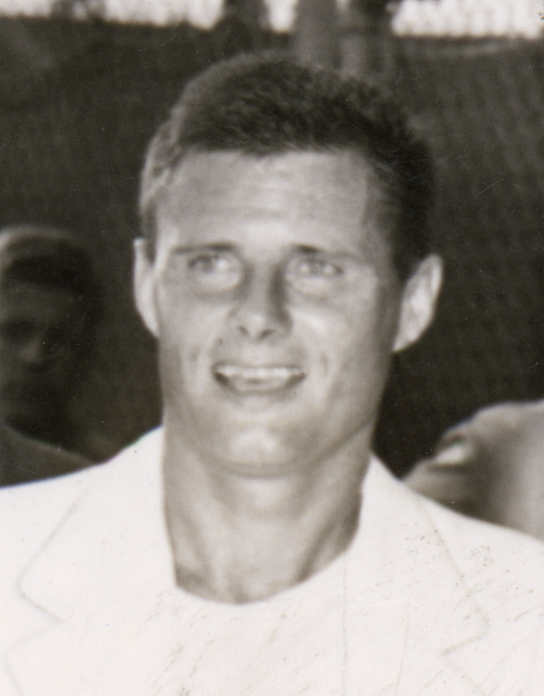
- Full name: Frederick Rudolph Schroeder
- Country (sports): United States
- Born: July 20, 1921 Newark, New Jersey, U.S.
- Died: May 26, 2006 (aged 84) La Jolla, California, U.S.
- Plays: Right-handed (1-handed backhand)
- Int. Tennis HoF: 1966 (member page)

Singles
- Career record: 27–5
- Highest ranking: No. 1 (1949, Pierre Gillou)

Grand Slam singles results
- Wimbledon: W (1949)
- US Open: W (1942)

Doubles
- Career record: 1–2

Grand Slam doubles results
- Wimbledon: F (1949)
- US Open: W (1940, 1941, 1947)

Grand Slam mixed doubles results
- Wimbledon: 1R (1971)
- US Open: W (1942)

Team competitions
- Davis Cup: W (1946, 1947, 1948, 1949)

Frederick Rudolph "Ted" Schroeder (July 20, 1921 – May 26, 2006) was an American tennis player who won the two most prestigious amateur tennis titles, Wimbledon and the U.S. National. He was the No. 1-ranked American amateur player in 1942; the No. 2 for 4 consecutive years, 1946 through 1949, and the latter year saw Schroeder ranked World No. 1 amateur by Pierre Gillou (president of the Fédération Française de Tennis). He was born in Newark, New Jersey, but developed as a tennis player in Southern California under the guidance of Perry T. Jones.

== Early life and career ==
Schroeder was born in Newark but moved to Glendale in his childhood where he learned to play tennis. He was discovered by Perry T. Jones, who was based at the Los Angeles Tennis Club and who was the mentor to several world-class players including Ellsworth Vines, Bobby Riggs and Jack Kramer. Schroeder was an almost exact contemporary of Kramer, having been born only 10 days earlier in 1921, and they began to play against each other as top boy players in the mid-1930s. Schroeder's career is similar to Kramer's in that they both became top players whose careers were then interrupted by World War II. They were also lifelong friends, and at least once, Schroeder mortgaged his house on short notice in order to be able to lend an unsolicited $25,000 to Kramer. Schroeder, however, attended college for four years, the first two at the University of Southern California (USC), and the last two at Stanford University.

== 'Lucky Ted' ==
When Riggs semi-retired, he became the promoter of the professional tour. He and Kramer decided that the only player who could oppose Kramer for a financially successful tour would be Schroeder. The youthful Pancho Gonzales was the reigning American amateur champion, but during his brief career, he had been beaten by Schroeder eight matches out of nine. Schroeder, playing during vacation time from his job, won Wimbledon in June 1949. Schroeder was two sets down against Gardnar Mulloy in round one and then had five-set wins against Frank Sedgman, Eric Sturgess, and Jaroslav Drobny in the quarterfinals, semifinals, and final. According to his obituary in the New York Times, he "captivated London as an outgoing, straightforward Yank smoking a corn-cob pipe and earned the nickname 'Lucky Ted' there for his five-set escapes".

== Professional hope ==
Following his Wimbledon victory, Riggs and Kramer offered Schroeder $25,000 to turn pro after he won the up-coming 1949 U.S. Championships. Schroeder accepted, but Gonzales upset these plans by beating the heavily favored Schroeder in a five-set final — it has been called the 11th greatest match of all time. Gonzales lost the 1-hour and 15-minute first set 16–18, but prevailed in the fifth set. Kramer wrrote that he had felt that Schroeder subconsciously "tanked" the match in order to avoid the rigors of the professional tour. Gonzales then became the two-time American champion, and Kramer and Riggs were obliged to sign him instead of Schroeder to a professional contract.

== Post-war ==
Schroeder was never much more than a part-time player after 1945, being preoccupied with his family and his career as vice president of a commercial refrigeration equipment company, and he never intended to turn professional. Schroeder said he took his tennis far too emotionally to allow him to treat it as a profession. He remained a successful amateur player for a few more years and then faded from view. He died in La Jolla, California at age 84. His son, John, is a professional golfer who has won on the PGA Tour.

== Abilities ==
In his 1979 autobiography, Jack Kramer included Schroeder in his list of the 21 greatest players of all time. Schroeder, says Kramer, "won with heart and stamina, but lacked in the simple mechanics."

Kramer wrote:

As a player, Schroed had weaknesses with his groundstrokes. Long before the rest of us, he was rushing the net because he couldn't rely on his backhand or forehand...he had the ideal attacking grass game: a terrific overhead and volley (especially the backhand) and that most valuable of all tools, a strong second serve. Also, Schroed was tough physically, at a time of long best-of-five deuce sets, and he was a great fighter.

Schroeder was inducted into the International Tennis Hall of Fame in Newport, Rhode Island in 1966.

== Grand Slam finals ==
=== Singles (2 titles, 1 runner-up) ===
Result	Year	Championship	Surface	Opponent	Score
Win	1942	U.S. Championships	Grass	(United States) Frank Parker	8–6, 7–5, 3–6, 4–6, 6–2
Win	1949	Wimbledon	Grass	(Czechoslovakia) Jaroslav Drobný	3–6, 6–0, 6–3, 4–6, 6–4
Loss	1949	U.S. Championships	Grass	(United States) Pancho Gonzales	18–16, 6–2, 1–6, 2–6, 4–6

=== Doubles (3 titles, 3 runner-ups) ===
Result	Year	Championship	Surface	Partner	Opponents	Score
Win	1940	U.S. Championships	Grass	(United States) Jack Kramer	(United States) Gardnar Mulloy (United States) Henry Prusoff	6–4, 8–6, 9–7
Win	1941	U.S. Championships	Grass	(United States) Jack Kramer	(United States) Wayne Sabin (United States) Gardnar Mulloy	9–7, 6–4, 6–2
Loss	1942	U.S. Championships	Grass	(United States) Sidney Wood	(United States) Gardnar Mulloy (United States) Bill Talbert	5–7, 7–9, 1–6
Win	1947	U.S. Championships	Grass	(United States) Jack Kramer	(United States) Bill Talbert (Australia) Bill Sidwell	6–4, 7–5, 6–3
Loss	1948	U.S. Championships	Grass	(United States) Frank Parker	(United States) Gardnar Mulloy (United States) Bill Talbert	6–1, 7–9, 3–6, 6–3, 7–9
Loss	1949	Wimbledon	Grass	(United States) Gardnar Mulloy	(United States) Pancho Gonzales (United States) Frank Parker	4–6, 4–6, 2–6

=== Mixed doubles (1 title) ===
Result	Year	Championship	Surface	Partner	Opponents	Score
Win	1942	U.S. Championships	Grass	(United States) Louise Brough	(United States) Patricia Canning Todd (Argentina) Alejo Russell	3–6, 6–1, 6–4

== Sources ==
- The Game, My 40 Years in Tennis (1979), Jack Kramer with Frank Deford (ISBN 0-399-12336-9)
- Man with a Racket, The Autobiography of Pancho Gonzales, as Told to Cy Rice (1959)
