= 1937 U.S. National Championships – Men's singles =

Men's singles
- 1937 U.S. National Championships

Final
- Champion: (United States) Don Budge
- Runner-up: (Germany) Gottfried von Cramm
- Score: 6–1, 7–9, 6–1, 3–6, 6–1

Events
Singles	men	women
Doubles	men	women
← 1936 ·	U.S. National Championships	· 1938 →

Don Budge defeated Gottfried von Cramm 6–1, 7–9, 6–1, 3–6, 6–1 in the final to win the men's singles tennis title at the 1937 U.S. National Championships.

== Seeds ==
The tournament used two lists of eight players for seeding the men's singles event; one for U.S. players and one for foreign players. Don Budge is the champion; others show the round in which they were eliminated.

U.S.

1. (United States) Don Budge (champion)
2. (United States) Bobby Riggs (semifinals)
3. (United States) Frank Parker (semifinals)
4. (United States) Bryan Grant (quarterfinals)
5. (United States) Joe Hunt (quarterfinals)
6. (United States) Hal Surface (fourth round)
7. (United States) John McDiarmid (third round)
8. (United States) John Van Ryn (quarterfinals)

Foreign

1. (Germany) Gottfried von Cramm (finalist)
2. (Germany) Henner Henkel (second round)
3. (Japan) Jiro Yamagishi (fourth round)
4. (United Kingdom) Charles Hare (quarterfinals)
5. (France) Yvon Petra (fourth round)
6. (Japan) Fumiteru Nakano (fourth round)
7. (Japan) Hideo Nishimura (second round)
8. (France) Jacques Brugnon (second round)

== Draw ==
=== Key ===
- Q = Qualifier
- WC = Wild card
- LL = Lucky loser
- r = Retired

=== Finals ===
Quarterfinals
1	(United States) Don Budge	6	6	6
9	(United States) Joseph Hunt	1	2	4
5	(United States) Frank Parker	6	12	6
15	(United States) John Van Ryn	2	10	2
3	(United States) Bobby Riggs	4	1	6	6	7
7	(United Kingdom) Charles Hare	6	6	3	0	5
7	(United States) Bryan Grant	7	6	6	3	3
1	(Germany) Gottfried von Cramm	9	2	2	6	6

Semifinals
1	(United States) Don Budge	6	6	6
5	(United States) Frank Parker	2	1	3
3	(United States) Bobby Riggs	6	8	3	3	2
1	(Germany) Gottfried von Cramm	0	6	6	6	6

Final
1	(United States) Don Budge	6	7	6	3	6
1	(Germany) Gottfried von Cramm	1	9	1	6	1

=== Earlier rounds ===
==== Section 1 ====
First round

Second round
1	(United States) Budge	6	6	6
(United States) Winslow	3	3	3
(United States) Anderson	2	6	1	0
(United States) Abrams	6	3	6	6
(United States) Mulloy
(United States) Bickel	w/o
(United States) Bowman	2	2	3
9	(France) Petra	6	6	6

Third round
1	(United States) Budge	6	6	6
(United States) Abrams	0	1	1
(United States) Mulloy	5	6	4	6	0
9	(France) Petra	7	3	6	3	6

Fourth round
1	(United States) Budge	6	6	6
9	(France) Petra	0	3	1

==== Section 2 ====
First round
(Canada) Watt	6	2	6	6
(United Kingdom) Earle	2	6	3	1
5	(Japan) Yamagishi	6	6	6
(United States) Carr	1	2	3

Second round
9	(United States) Hunt	7	6	6
(United States) Morrison	5	3	2
(United States) Low	4	4	7
(United States) Anderson	6	6	9
(United States) Alloo	1	2	0
(United States) Cameron	6	6	6
(Canada) Watt	2	1	3
5	(Japan) Yamagishi	6	6	6

Third round
9	(United States) Hunt	1	5	6	7	6
(United States) Anderson	6	7	1	5	0
(United States) Cameron	2	3	6
5	(Japan) Yamagishi	6	6	8

Fourth round
9	(United States) Hunt	3	6	6	6
5	(Japan) Yamagishi	6	1	1	1

==== Section 3 ====
First round
5	(United States) Parker	6	6	6
(United States) Gillespie	2	1	0
(United States) Bowden
(United States) Peterson	w/o
(United States) Hunt	6	6	6
(United States) Harman	2	1	4
17	(United Kingdom) Jones	6	6	3	6
(Italy) Cuccioli	3	4	6	3
(United States) Cooke	6	6	6
(United States) Lauck	4	1	3
(United States) Kantrowitz	6	12	6
(United States) Burt	3	10	3
(United States) Wood	6	6	6
(United States) Kynaston	1	2	2
13	(Japan) Nishimura	6	9	6
(United States) Kelleher	4	7	3

Second round
5	(United States) Parker	3	6	6	6
(United States) Bowden	6	2	3	1
(United States) Hunt	6	6	6
17	(United Kingdom) Jones	0	3	3
(United States) Cooke	6	6	7
(United States) Kantrowitz	1	4	5
(United States) Wood	4	6	6	6
13	(Japan) Nishimura	6	2	2	0

Third round
5	(United States) Parker	6	8	6
(United States) Hunt	1	6	1
(United States) Cooke	2	2	2
(United States) Wood	6	6	6

Fourth round
5	(United States) Parker	3	4	6	6	6
(United States) Wood	6	6	1	3	0

==== Section 4 ====
First round
15	(United States) Van Ryn	5	8	8	6
(United States) Dunn	7	6	6	4
(United States) Heldman	7	12	3	6
(United States) Hendrix	5	10	6	3
(United States) Hartman	6	6	6
(United States) Lavine	2	3	1
(United States) Coghlan
(United States) Dorson	w/o
(United States) Harris	6	6	1	2	6
(United States) Mangin	0	1	6	6	0
(United States) Lurie
(United States) Potts	w/o
(United States) Buxby	4	7	6	6
(United States) Podesta	6	5	3	1
3	(Germany) Henkel	6	7	6
(United States) Bobbitt	1	5	0

Second round
15	(United States) Van Ryn	6	9	10	6	6
(United States) Heldman	8	7	12	3	2
(United States) Hartman	6	3	8	6	4
(United States) Coghlan	3	6	6	8	6
(United States) Harris	6	2	7	5	6
(United States) Lurie	2	6	5	7	4
(United States) Buxby	5	6	6	6
3	(Germany) Henkel	7	1	4	4

Third round
15	(United States) Van Ryn	6	8	6
(United States) Coghlan	4	6	1
(United States) Harris	6	7	12	6
(United States) Buxby	8	5	10	1

Fourth round
15	(United States) Van Ryn	6	6	6
(United States) Harris	3	1	1

==== Section 5 ====
First round
3	(United States) Riggs	7	6	9
(United States) McGehee	5	1	7
(United States) Mako	6	6	6
(United States) Lucia	3	1	4
(United States) Davenport	1	6	8	6
(United States) Marcum	6	1	6	4
(United States) Robertson
(United States) Sutter	w/o
(United States) Swanson	5	4	6	6	6
(United States) Washburn	7	6	3	1	3
(United States) Lubin	8	10	6
(United States) Tilden	6	8	4
(United States) Welsh	1	9	6	6
(United States) Fishbach	6	7	0	1
11	(Japan) Nakano	7	6	6
(United States) Gilpin	5	2	1

Second round
3	(United States) Riggs	2	6	6	7
(United States) Mako	6	3	4	5
(United States) Davenport	1	6	17	5
(United States) Robertson	6	3	19	7
(United States) Swanson	7	7	4	6
(United States) Lubin	5	5	6	4
(United States) Welsh	1	6	1	4
11	(Japan) Nakano	6	4	6	6

Third round
3	(United States) Riggs	6	6	6
(United States) Robertson	4	4	4
(United States) Swanson	8	6	1	6	3
11	(Japan) Nakano	10	4	6	3	6

Fourth round
3	(United States) Riggs	3	7	6	8
11	(Japan) Nakano	6	5	3	6

==== Section 6 ====
First round
13	(United States) McDiarmid	6	3	6	6
(United States) Wetherell	1	6	1	0
(United States) Mitchell
(United States) Fischer	w/o
(United States) Coggeshall	6	6	6
(United States) Curtiss	2	1	2
(United States) Cuninggim	4	6	6	6
18	(Canada) Wilson	6	3	4	3
(United States) Culley	6	6	6
(United States) Lynch	4	3	4
(United States) Adelsberg
(United States) McCauliff	w/o
(United States) Mattmann	6	6	8
(United States) Rider	4	4	6
7	(United Kingdom) Hare	6	6	6
(United States) Mercur	3	2	4

Second round
13	(United States) McDiarmid	6	6	6
(United States) Mitchell	4	3	4
(United States) Coggeshall	3	1	5
(United States) Cuninggim	6	6	7
(United States) Culley	6	6	6
(United States) Adelsberg	0	1	4
(United States) Mattmann	3	1	2
7	(United Kingdom) Hare	6	6	6

Third round
13	(United States) McDiarmid	3	6	3	6	5r
(United States) Cuninggim	6	3	6	4	1
(United States) Culley	6	6	4	1	0
7	(United Kingdom) Hare	4	2	6	6	6

Fourth round
(United States) Cuninggim	6	6	3	4	2
7	(United Kingdom) Hare	4	4	6	6	6

==== Section 7 ====
First round
7	(United States) Grant	6	9	6
(United Kingdom) Deloford	4	7	3
(United States) Hall	2	6	6	6
(United States) Hawley	6	3	4	2

Second round
7	(United States) Grant	6	6	6
(United States) Hall	2	2	1
(United States) Steele Jr.
(United States) Burgess	w/o
(United States) Guernsey	5	2	6	5
(United States) Sabin	7	6	1	7
(United States) Toley	8	6	6
15	(France) Brugnon	6	4	1

Third round
7	(United States) Grant	6	6	6
(United States) Steele Jr.	4	2	2
(United States) Sabin	6	6	1	6
(United States) Toley	3	3	6	4

Fourth round
7	(United States) Grant	6	4	5	6	6
(United States) Sabin	2	6	7	1	1

==== Section 8 ====
First round

Second round
11	(United States) Surface
(United States) Moreno	w/o
(United States) Mahoney	4	3	3
(United States) Kamrath	6	6	6
(United States) McNeill	6	6	6
(United States) Umstaedter	0	3	2
(United States) Jarvis	1	4	2
1	(Germany) von Cramm	6	6	6

Third round
11	(United States) Surface	6	3	6
(United States) Kamrath	3	6	3
(United States) McNeill	2	3	6	4
1	(Germany) von Cramm	6	6	2	6

Fourth round
11	(United States) Surface	6	5	6	5
1	(Germany) von Cramm	8	7	3	7

Preceded by 1937 Wimbledon Championships	Grand Slams; Men's Singles	Succeeded by 1938 Australian Championships
