= 1934 U.S. National Championships – Men's singles =

Men's singles
- 1934 U.S. National Championships

Final
- Champion: (United Kingdom) Fred Perry
- Runner-up: (United States) Wilmer Allison
- Score: 6–4, 6–3, 3–6, 1–6, 8–6

Details
- Draw: 89
- Seeds: 15

Events
Singles	men	women
Doubles	men	women
← 1933 ·	U.S. National Championships	· 1935 →

Reigning champion Fred Perry defeated Wilmer Allison 6–4, 6–3, 3–6, 1–6, 8–6 in the final to win the men's singles tennis title at the 1934 U.S. National Championships.

== Seeds ==
The tournament used two lists of players for seeding the men's singles event; one for U.S. players and one for foreign players. Fred Perry is the champion; others show the round in which they were eliminated.

U.S.

1. (United States) Frank Shields (quarterfinals)
2. (United States) Wilmer Allison (finalist)
3. (United States) Sidney Wood (semifinals)
4. (United States) Berkeley Bell (fourth round)
5. (United States) Lester Stoefen (quarterfinals)
6. (United States) Frank Parker (quarterfinals)
7. (United States) Bryan Grant (third round)
8. (United States) George Lott (third round)

Foreign

1. (United Kingdom) Fred Perry (champion)
2. (Czechoslovakia) Roderich Menzel (fourth round)
3. (South Africa) Vernon Kirby (semifinals)
4. (United Kingdom) Frank Wilde (third round)

== Draw ==
=== Key ===
- Q = Qualifier
- WC = Wild card
- LL = Lucky loser
- r = Retired

=== Finals ===
Quarterfinals
1	(United States) Frank Shields	6	4	4	3
(3)	(South Africa) Vernon Kirby	4	6	6	6
(United States) Clifford Sutter	3	0	2
(1)	(United Kingdom) Fred Perry	6	6	6
2	(United States) Wilmer Allison	8	4	11	6	6
5	(United States) Lester Stoefen	6	6	9	8	3
3	(United States) Sidney Wood	6	6	7
6	(United States) Frank Parker	4	4	5

Semifinals
(3)	(South Africa) Vernon Kirby	2	6	4	2
(1)	(United Kingdom) Fred Perry	6	2	6	6
2	(United States) Wilmer Allison	6	6	6
3	(United States) Sidney Wood	3	2	3

Final
(1)	(United Kingdom) Fred Perry	6	6	3	1	8
2	(United States) Wilmer Allison	4	3	6	6	6

=== Earlier rounds ===
==== Section 1 ====
First round

Second round
1	(United States) Shields	6	6	6
(United States) Herndon	3	1	3
(United States) Tidball	6	6	9
(United States) Challiss	0	1	7
(United States) Friedman	3	1	3
(United States) Bryan	6	6	6
(United States) Washburn	6	6	1
(United States) Goeltz	8	8	6

Third round
1	(United States) Shields	6	8	6
(United States) Tidball	3	6	3
(United States) Bryan	6	2	6	6
(United States) Goeltz	2	6	1	3

Fourth round
1	(United States) Shields	9	4	2	6	6
(United States) Bryan	7	6	6	3	2

==== Section 2 ====
First round

Second round
11	(United States) Grant	6	3	4	6	6
(Spain) Alonso-Areyzaga	3	6	6	0	4
(United States) Tilden	2	1	4
(United States) Budge	6	6	6
(United States) Kelleher	6	3	0
(United States) Tilney	8	6	6
(Canada) Watt	5	3	1
5	(South Africa) Kirby	7	6	6

Third round
11	(United States) Grant	6	3	4	8	3
(United States) Budge	3	6	6	6	6
(United States) Tilney	2	3	0
5	(South Africa) Kirby	6	6	6

Fourth round
(United States) Budge	6	4	4	4
5	(South Africa) Kirby	4	6	6	6

==== Section 3 ====
First round
(United States) Kurzrok	14	6	4	4	7
(Canada) Murray	12	4	6	6	5
13	(United States) Sutter	6	6	6
(United States) Griffin	1	2	4
(United States) Jacobs	6	6	7
(United States) Potts	3	1	5
(United States) Garnett	6	6	6
(United States) Marks	0	2	4
(United States) Thompson	6	5	6	6
(United States) Verstraten	3	7	1	2

Second round
7	(United States) Bell
(United States) Frame	w/o
(United States) Lynch	6	7	2	0	2
(United States) Kurzrok	4	5	6	6	6
13	(United States) Sutter	6	6	2
(United States) Jacobs	2	1	2	r
(United States) Garnett	6	6	6
(United States) Thompson	1	4	3

Third round
7	(United States) Bell	4	9	6	6
(United States) Kurzrok	6	7	3	2
13	(United States) Sutter	8	6	6
(United States) Garnett	6	2	1

Fourth round
7	(United States) Bell	3	5	4
13	(United States) Sutter	6	7	6

==== Section 4 ====
First round
12	(United States) Lott	6	10	5	5	6
(United States) Hecht	2	8	7	7	3
(United States) Sutter	6	6	6	4	6
(United States) Hartman	8	4	2	6	2
(United States) Hendrix	6	4	6	6
(Spain) De Olivares	1	6	2	4
(United States) Fiebleman	6	7	6
(United States) Major	3	5	2
(United States) Lay	6	6	6
(United States) Clothier	3	0	2
(United States) Talbot	6	6	6
(United States) Kingman	4	4	2
(United States) Buxby	7	6	6
(United States) Dickinson	5	4	0
1	(United Kingdom) Perry	6	6	6
(United States) Schweikhardt	0	1	3

Second round
12	(United States) Lott	6	7	6
(United States) Sutter	3	5	3
(United States) Hendrix	4	2	2
(United States) Fiebleman	6	6	6
(United States) Lay	6	3	1	3
(United States) Talbot	3	6	6	6
(United States) Buxby	3	1	4
1	(United Kingdom) Perry	6	6	6

Third round
12	(United States) Lott	6	1	6	4	4
(United States) Fiebleman	2	6	3	6	6
(United States) Talbot	3	1	4
1	(United Kingdom) Perry	6	6	6

Fourth round
(United States) Fiebleman	2	1	2
1	(United Kingdom) Perry	6	6	6

==== Section 5 ====
First round
3	(United States) Allison	6	7	6
(United States) Hunt	3	5	4
(United States) McCauliff	6	6	6
(United States) O'Loughlin	3	3	3
(United States) Hall	8	6	7
(United States) Hawley	6	4	5
(United States) Mako	6	6	6
(United States) Boulware	2	1	1
(United States) McDiarmid	6	6	6
(United States) Law	3	1	1
(United States) Macpherson	2	6	8	6
(United States) Smith	6	1	6	4
(United States) Hines	8	6	6
(United States) Gilpin	6	4	4
(United States) Hebard	8	6	10
(United States) Pratt	6	3	8

Second round
3	(United States) Allison	6	3	7	4	6
(United States) McCauliff	4	6	5	6	2
(United States) Hall	6	1	1	3
(United States) Mako	3	6	6	6
(United States) McDiarmid	6	7	6
(United States) Macpherson	1	5	1
(United States) Hines	6	6	6
(United States) Hebard	2	0	2

Third round
3	(United States) Allison	6	2	6	6
(United States) Mako	3	6	1	2
(United States) McDiarmid	3	6	6	1	6
(United States) Hines	6	2	3	6	1

Fourth round
3	(United States) Allison	3	6	10	7
(United States) McDiarmid	6	2	8	5

==== Section 6 ====
First round
9	(United States) Stoefen	6	6	6
(United States) Farrin	1	1	1
(United States) Flynn	9	6	6	7
(United States) Fischer	7	8	3	5
(United States) Bowman	6	6	6
(United States) Millen	2	1	1
(United States) Martin	6	6	2	6
(United States) Anderson	4	1	6	4

Second round
9	(United States) Stoefen	6	6	6
(United States) Flynn	2	4	4
(United States) Bowman	6	6	6
(United States) Martin	2	2	1
15	(United States) Van Ryn	6	6	6
(United States) Prusoff	1	2	3
(United States) Podesta	2	2	2
7	(United Kingdom) Wilde	6	6	6

Third round
9	(United States) Stoefen	6	7	6
(United States) Bowman	4	5	4
15	(United States) Van Ryn	8	6	6
7	(United Kingdom) Wilde	6	4	2

Fourth round
9	(United States) Stoefen	6	6	6
15	(United States) Van Ryn	3	3	4

==== Section 7 ====
First round

Second round
5	(United States) Wood	6	6	6
(United States) Davenport	2	4	4
(United States) John	w/o
(United States) Bowden
(United States) Reese	8	1	2	1
(Canada) Rainville	6	6	6	6
(United States) Welsh	6	6	7	6
(United States) Geller	4	4	9	3

Third round
5	(United States) Wood	6	6	12
(United States) Bowden	4	3	10
(Canada) Rainville	3	3	6	6	6
(United States) Welsh	6	6	2	4	1

Fourth round
5	(United States) Wood	6	6	6
(Canada) Rainville	1	4	4

==== Section 8 ====
First round

Second round
10	(United States) Parker
(United States) Burns	w/o
(Brazil) De Menezes	0	0	0
(United States) Stanford	6	6	6
14	(United States) Mangin	6	6	6
(United States) De Mott	3	1	3
(United States) Longtin	6	9	3	0
3	(Czechoslovakia) Menzel	2	11	6	6

Third round
10	(United States) Parker	6	6	6
(United States) Stanford	2	1	2
14	(United States) Mangin	6	6	6	6	3
3	(Czechoslovakia) Menzel	8	4	3	8	6

Fourth round
10	(United States) Parker	3	7	6	6
3	(Czechoslovakia) Menzel	6	5	3	2

Preceded by 1934 Wimbledon Championships	Grand Slams; Men's Singles	Succeeded by 1935 Australian Championships
