= 1935 U.S. National Championships – Men's singles =

Men's singles
- 1935 U.S. National Championships

Final
- Champion: (United States) Wilmer Allison
- Runner-up: (United States) Sidney Wood
- Score: 6–2, 6–2, 6–3

Events
Singles	men	women
Doubles	men	women
← 1934 ·	U.S. National Championships	· 1936 →

Wilmer Allison defeated Sidney Wood 6–2, 6–2, 6–3 in the final to win the men's singles tennis title at the 1935 U.S. National Championships.

== Seeds ==
The tournament used two lists of players for seeding the men's singles event; one for U.S. players and one for foreign players. Wilmer Allison is the champion; others show the round in which they were eliminated.

U.S.

1. (United States) Wilmer Allison (champion)
2. (United States) Don Budge (quarterfinals)
3. (United States) Frank Shields (quarterfinals)
4. (United States) Sidney Wood (finalist)
5. (United States) Bryan Grant (semifinals)
6. (United States) Frank Parker (fourth round)
7. (United States) Berkeley Bell (first round)
8. (United States) Gregory Mangin (quarterfinals)

Foreign

1. (United Kingdom) Fred Perry (semifinals)
2. (Czechoslovakia) Roderich Menzel (fourth round)
3. (France) Christian Boussus (first round)
4. (Spain) Enrique Maier (quarterfinals)
5. (France) André Martin-Legeay (third round)
6. (France) Jacques Brugnon (first round)
7. (New Zealand) Eskell Andrews (second round)

== Draw ==
=== Key ===
- Q = Qualifier
- WC = Wild card
- LL = Lucky loser
- r = Retired

=== Finals ===
Quarterfinals
3	(United States) Don Budge	4	4	7	3
9	(United States) Bryan Grant	6	6	5	6
7	(United States) Sidney Wood	3	6	6	6
15	(United States) Gregory Mangin	6	1	1	2
1	(United States) Wilmer Allison	6	6	6
7	(Spain) Enrique Maier	2	4	4
5	(United States) Frank Shields	4	6	6	0
1	(United Kingdom) Fred Perry	6	4	8	6

Semifinals
9	(United States) Bryan Grant	2	6	10	2
7	(United States) Sidney Wood	6	4	12	6
1	(United States) Wilmer Allison	7	6	6
1	(United Kingdom) Fred Perry	5	3	3

Final
7	(United States) Sidney Wood	2	2	3
1	(United States) Wilmer Allison	6	6	6

=== Earlier rounds ===
==== Section 1 ====
First round

Second round
3	(United States) Budge	6	6	6
(United States) Hawley	1	0	1
(United States) Hines	6	6	9
(United States) Garnett	0	1	7
16	(United States) Van Ryn	6	6	6
(United States) Behr	2	0	1
(United States) Willis	2	1	2
9	(France) Martin-Legeay	6	6	6

Third round
3	(United States) Budge	9	6	7
(United States) Hines	7	1	5
16	(United States) Van Ryn	6	6	6
9	(France) Martin-Legeay	0	3	3

Fourth round
3	(United States) Budge	8	6	8
16	(United States) Van Ryn	6	4	6

==== Section 2 ====
First round
(United States) Harman	6	3	7	6
5	(France) Boussus	4	6	5	1

Second round
9	(United States) Grant	6	6	6
(United States) Clothier	3	1	4
(United States) Nelson	4	3	2
(Canada) Murray	6	6	6
(United States) Hess	6	6	6
(United States) Nogrady	1	1	2
(United States) Hecht	1	1	0
(United States) Harman	6	6	6

Third round
9	(United States) Grant	6	6	6
(Canada) Murray	1	2	2
(United States) Hess	7	6	5	2	6
(United States) Harman	5	2	7	6	4

Fourth round
9	(United States) Grant	7	5	6	6
(United States) Hess	5	7	1	4

==== Section 3 ====
First round
7	(United States) Wood	1	6	6	6
(United States) Reese	6	2	3	2
(United States) Hall	6	6	6
(United States) Fischer	0	4	3
(United States) Fiebleman	4	6	6	6
(United States) Ruckert	6	3	2	2
(United States) Mercur	6	6	10
(United States) Washburn	3	4	8
(United States) Seewagen	6	6	6
(United States) Kynaston	0	2	2
(United States) McDiarmid	6	1	7	6
(United States) Robertson	4	6	5	3
(United States) Buxby	4	2	6	6	6
(United States) Potts	6	6	1	1	3
13	(New Zealand) Andrews	6	6	6
(United States) Broida	3	4	3

Second round
7	(United States) Wood	3	3	6	6	6
(United States) Hall	6	6	4	4	4
(United States) Fiebleman	1	6	6	3	10
(United States) Mercur	6	4	3	6	8
(United States) Seewagen	2	3	2
(United States) McDiarmid	6	6	6
(United States) Buxby	5	5	6	6	6
13	(New Zealand) Andrews	7	7	3	4	4

Third round
7	(United States) Wood	6	6	6
(United States) Fiebleman	3	2	1
(United States) McDiarmid	7	1	6	6	6
(United States) Buxby	5	6	1	8	3

Fourth round
7	(United States) Wood	6	6	4	6
(United States) McDiarmid	2	3	6	1

==== Section 4 ====
First round
15	(United States) Mangin	6	6	6
(United States) Colvin	4	4	1
(United States) Burwell	6	5	6	6
(United States) Fischer	2	7	2	3
(United States) Lott	6	6	6
(United States) Stanford	4	4	2
(United States) Kurzrok	6	8	6	6
(United States) Geller	2	10	2	1
(United States) Kelleher	7	7	6	6
(United States) Hebard	9	5	3	4
(Canada) Watt	7	6	8	8	6
(United States) Watt	9	8	6	6	2
(United States) Williams	3	4	6	7	7
(United States) Welsh	6	6	1	5	5
3	(Czechoslovakia) Menzel	7	6	4	6
(United States) Tilney	5	3	6	2

Second round
15	(United States) Mangin	6	6	6
(United States) Burwell	3	4	4
(United States) Lott	5	1	4
(United States) Kurzrok	7	6	6
(United States) Kelleher	4	0	4
(Canada) Watt	6	6	6
(United States) Williams	2	2	0
3	(Czechoslovakia) Menzel	6	6	6

Third round
15	(United States) Mangin	6	6	6
(United States) Kurzrok	4	1	0
(Canada) Watt	4	2	3
3	(Czechoslovakia) Menzel	6	6	6

Fourth round
15	(United States) Mangin	6	9	6
3	(Czechoslovakia) Menzel	1	7	2

==== Section 5 ====
First round
1	(United States) Allison	6	6	6
(United States) Brunie	0	2	2
(United States) Flynn	9	6	6
(United States) Lay	7	3	1
(United States) O'Loughlin	6	8	6
(United States) Herndon	3	6	2
(United States) Culley	6	6	5	6
(United States) Lurie	3	1	7	0
17	(United States) Sutter	6	6	6
(United States) De Gray	3	3	2
(United States) Millman	6	6	6
(United States) Law	1	0	2
(United States) Lavine	6	6	2	6
(United States) Madden	3	4	6	2
(United States) Mako	0	6	7	6
11	(France) Brugnon	6	2	5	1

Second round
1	(United States) Allison	6	6	6
(United States) Flynn	2	2	1
(United States) O'Loughlin	3	3	4
(United States) Culley	6	6	6
17	(United States) Sutter	7	6	6	6
(United States) Millman	9	3	2	4
(United States) Lavine	6	3	3	4
(United States) Mako	4	6	6	6

Third round
1	(United States) Allison	3	6	6	6
(United States) Culley	6	4	2	3
17	(United States) Sutter	6	6	3	2	4
(United States) Mako	4	3	6	6	6

Fourth round
1	(United States) Allison	6	6	7
(United States) Mako	2	0	5

==== Section 6 ====
First round
(Spain) Alonso-Areyzaga	6	7	6	7	6
13	(United States) Bell	4	9	8	5	4
(United States) Little
(United States) Lee	w/o
(United States) Frame	6	6	6
(United States) Lauck	1	3	0
(United States) Hunt	7	6	4	14
(United States) Thompson	5	1	6	12
(United States) Bowman	4	8	6	6
(United States) Patterson	6	6	4	1
(Republic of China (1912–1949)) Cheng	0	6	6	4	6
(United States) Gilpin	6	2	3	6	2
(United States) Surface	6	6	6
(United States) Underwood	1	3	0
7	(Spain) Maier	6	6	6
(United States) Donovan	2	1	3

Second round
(Spain) Alonso-Areyzaga	6	6	8
(United States) Little	3	4	6
(United States) Frame	4	5	6	3
(United States) Hunt	6	7	3	6
(United States) Bowman	6	5	7	6	6
(Republic of China (1912–1949)) Cheng	8	7	5	4	4
(United States) Surface	3	8	0	4
7	(Spain) Maier	6	6	6	6

Third round
(Spain) Alonso-Areyzaga	6	6	6	6
(United States) Hunt	8	2	1	4
(United States) Bowman	2	2	4
7	(Spain) Maier	6	6	6

Fourth round
(Spain) Alonso-Areyzaga	1	2	6
7	(Spain) Maier	6	6	8

==== Section 7 ====
First round
5	(United States) Shields	6	6	6
(Canada) Emard	0	3	1

Second round
5	(United States) Shields	6	6	6
(United States) Sutter	2	0	0
(United States) Prusoff	3	4	6	6	6
(United States) Davenport	6	6	1	4	1
(United States) Harris	6	1	4
(United States) Bowden	8	6	6
(United States) Boulware	4	5	6	7	10
(United States) Goeltz	6	7	4	5	8

Third round
5	(United States) Shields	7	7	2	7
(United States) Prusoff	5	5	6	5
(United States) Bowden	6	6	6
(United States) Boulware	1	3	4

Fourth round
5	(United States) Shields	6	6	6
(United States) Bowden	1	4	2

==== Section 8 ====
First round

Second round
11	(United States) Parker	6	6	4	6
(United States) Thompson	0	0	6	2
(United States) Bryan	6	6	6
(United States) Tilney	0	2	2
(United States) Tilden	3	2	6	4
(United States) Hartman	6	6	3	6
(United States) Fowler	3	2	1
1	(United Kingdom) Perry	6	6	6

Third round
11	(United States) Parker	6	6	7
(United States) Bryan	1	1	5
(United States) Hartman	4	3	5
1	(United Kingdom) Perry	6	6	7

Fourth round
11	(United States) Parker	4	2	0
1	(United Kingdom) Perry	6	6	6

Preceded by 1935 Wimbledon Championships	Grand Slams; Men's Singles	Succeeded by 1936 Australian Championships
