= 1936 U.S. National Championships – Men's singles =

Men's singles
- 1936 U.S. National Championships

Final
- Champion: (United Kingdom) Fred Perry
- Runner-up: (United States) Don Budge
- Score: 2–6, 6–2, 8–6, 1–6, 10–8

Events
Singles	men	women
Doubles	men	women
← 1935 ·	U.S. National Championships	· 1937 →

Fred Perry defeated Don Budge 2–6, 6–2, 8–6, 1–6, 10–8 in the final to win the men's singles tennis title at the 1936 U.S. National Championships.

It would be Perry's final Grand Slam tournament victory, as well as his final appearance before turning professional. Perry's victory would be the last for a British man in a Grand Slam singles event until Andy Murray won the successor to this tournament, the US Open, in 2012.

== Seeds ==
The tournament used two lists of players for seeding the men's singles event; one for U.S. players and one for foreign players. Fred Perry is the champion; others show the round in which they were eliminated.

U.S.

1. (United States) Don Budge (finalist)
2. (United States) Bryan Grant (semifinals)
3. (United States) Sidney Wood (fourth round)
4. (United States) Frank Parker (semifinals)
5. (United States) Bobby Riggs (fourth round)
6. (United States) Gregory Mangin (quarterfinals)
7. (United States) John McDiarmid (quarterfinals)
8. (United States) Hal Surface (second round)

Foreign

1. (United Kingdom) Fred Perry (champion)
2. (France) Bernard Destremau (fourth round)
3. (France) Jacques Brugnon (third round)
4. (France) Yvon Petra (fourth round)
5. (France) Pierre Pellizza (fourth round)

== Draw ==
=== Key ===
- Q = Qualifier
- WC = Wild card
- LL = Lucky loser
- r = Retired

=== Finals ===
Quarterfinals
2	(United States) Bryan Grant	3	8	6	6
(United States) John Van Ryn	6	6	0	3
(United States) Henry Culley	3	2	1
(1)	(United Kingdom) Fred Perry	6	6	6
1	(United States) Don Budge	6	6	6
7	(United States) John McDiarmid	4	3	2
4	(United States) Frank Parker	10	6	4	6	6
6	(United States) Gregory Mangin	12	0	6	1	3

Semifinals
2	(United States) Bryan Grant	4	6	5	2
(1)	(United Kingdom) Fred Perry	6	3	7	6
1	(United States) Don Budge	6	6	6
4	(United States) Frank Parker	4	3	3

Final
(1)	(United Kingdom) Fred Perry	2	6	8	1	10
1	(United States) Don Budge	6	2	6	6	8

=== Earlier rounds ===
==== Section 1 ====
First round

Second round
2	(United States) Grant	6	6	6
(United States) Dullnig	1	2	3
(United States) Pagel	5	4	0
(United States) De Gray	7	6	6
(Canada) Murray	6	6	6
(United States) Macpherson	1	4	3
(Canada) Watt	6	2	3	3
(5)	(France) Pellizza	1	6	6	6

Third round
2	(United States) Grant	6	6	6
(United States) De Gray	0	1	3
(Canada) Murray	3	3	3
(5)	(France) Pellizza	6	6	6

Fourth round
2	(United States) Grant	6	6	9
(5)	(France) Pellizza	0	2	7

==== Section 2 ====
First round

Second round
5	(United States) Riggs	6	6	4	6
(United States) Sabin	2	2	6	4
(United States) Tilney	6	7	8	6
(United States) McCauliff	8	5	6	3
(United States) Senior	4	2	2
(United States) Van Ryn	6	6	6
(United States) Mercur	6	6	3	6	5
(3)	(France) Brugnon	4	8	6	1	7

Third round
5	(United States) Riggs	6	4	6	6
(United States) Tilney	4	6	2	3
(United States) Van Ryn	6	6	6
(3)	(France) Brugnon	3	3	2

Fourth round
5	(United States) Riggs	2	3	6	3
(United States) Van Ryn	6	6	3	6

==== Section 3 ====
First round
(United States) Hall	6	3	10	6
(United States) Welsh	4	6	8	4
(United States) Morrison	6	5	7	6
(United States) Washburn	2	7	5	4
(United States) Davenport	1	6	6	9
(United States) Daniels	6	4	1	7
(United States) Nogrady	6	6	2	3	6
(United States) Decker	4	1	6	6	4
(United States) Culley	6	6	7	6
(United States) Cuninggim	3	3	9	3

Second round
3	(United States) Wood	7	3	6	7
(United States) Halstead	5	6	4	5
(United States) Underwood	6	1	2	4
(United States) Hall	4	6	6	6
(United States) Morrison	4	3	6	3
(United States) Davenport	6	6	4	6
(United States) Nogrady	6	3	4	3
(United States) Culley	0	6	6	6

Third round
3	(United States) Wood	1	2	6	6	6
(United States) Hall	6	6	0	3	4
(United States) Davenport	9	3	4	6	0
(United States) Culley	7	6	6	1	6

Fourth round
3	(United States) Wood	4	5	6	3
(United States) Culley	6	7	3	6

==== Section 4 ====
First round
8	(United States) Surface	6	6	7
(United States) O'Loughlin	0	3	5
(United States) Mako	6	4	6	6
(United States) Bickel	1	6	1	0
(United States) Guibord	6	4	1	7	6
(United States) Thompson	1	6	6	5	3
(United States) Reese	6	6	6
(United States) Potts	2	2	3
(United States) Jones	6	6	6
(United States) Boulware	2	3	4
(United States) Hendrix	0	6	6	6
(United States) Hecht	6	4	0	4
(United States) Sutter	5	6	6	6
(United States) Leavens	7	4	0	0
(United States) Jarvis	0	0	2
(1)	(United Kingdom) Perry	6	6	6

Second round
8	(United States) Surface	6	2	4	8	5
(United States) Mako	3	6	6	6	7
(United States) Guibord	0	7	7	2
(United States) Reese	6	9	5	6
(United States) Jones	6	6	7	5	6
(United States) Hendrix	8	3	5	7	4
(United States) Sutter	6	2	1
(1)	(United Kingdom) Perry	8	6	6

Third round
(United States) Mako	6	6	6
(United States) Reese	3	1	2
(United States) Jones	3	1	6	0
(1)	(United Kingdom) Perry	6	6	4	6

Fourth round
(United States) Mako	0	3	2
(1)	(United Kingdom) Perry	6	6	6

==== Section 5 ====
First round
1	(United States) Budge	6	6	6
(United States) Seewagen	0	1	0
(United States) Mulloy	6	6	6
(Canada) Le Clerc	2	3	2
(United States) Hunt	6	6	6
(United States) Tarpley	0	2	4
(United States) Hartman	10	8	6
(United States) Carr	8	6	3
(United States) Goeltz	6	6	6
(United States) Hartford	3	1	3
(United States) Smith	6	6	6	1	6
(United States) Hawley	1	3	8	6	3
(United States) Mattmann	4	7	6	4	6
(United States) Lynch	6	5	4	6	0
(United States) Lurie	13	10	6
(United States) Burgess	11	8	1

Second round
1	(United States) Budge	4	6	6	6
(United States) Mulloy	6	2	0	1
(United States) Hunt	6	3	6	3	6
(United States) Hartman	3	6	3	6	1
(United States) Goeltz	2	1	6	3
(United States) Smith	6	6	4	6
(United States) Mattmann	6	1	7	7	6
(United States) Lurie	3	6	5	9	4

Third round
1	(United States) Budge	6	6	9
(United States) Hunt	3	4	7
(United States) Smith	10	6	6
(United States) Mattmann	8	2	2

Fourth round
1	(United States) Budge	6	6	3	6
(United States) Smith	2	3	6	3

==== Section 6 ====
First round
7	(United States) McDiarmid	6	6	6
(United States) Anderson	3	3	2
(United States) Dunn	6	9	6
(United States) Kelleher	2	7	2
(United States) Madden	7	6	6
(United States) Broida	5	2	3
(United States) Bowden	6	6	6
(United States) Bowman	4	0	2
(United States) Hunt	6	6	10
(United States) Ruehl	3	4	8

Second round
7	(United States) McDiarmid	6	6	6
(United States) Dunn	2	2	3
(United States) Madden	2	0	1
(United States) Bowden	6	6	6
(United States) Hunt	10	8	7	2	6
(United States) Buxby	8	10	5	6	4
(United States) Seward	w/o
(4)	(France) Petra

Third round
7	(United States) McDiarmid	8	8	6	7	6
(United States) Bowden	10	10	2	5	4
(United States) Hunt	6	3	6	4	4
(4)	(France) Petra	4	6	4	6	6

Fourth round
7	(United States) McDiarmid	6	6	8
(4)	(France) Petra	1	3	6

==== Section 7 ====
First round

Second round
4	(United States) Parker	6	6	6
(Spain) Alonso-Areyzaga	2	2	1
(United States) Clothier	2	2	1
(United States) Harris	6	6	6
(United States) Glidden	6	3	1	0
(United States) Robertson	3	6	6	6
(United States) Alloo	w/o
(United States) Harman

Third round
4	(United States) Parker	6	3	6	7
(United States) Harris	4	6	1	5
(United States) Robertson	0	0	0
(United States) Harman	6	6	6

Fourth round
4	(United States) Parker	8	6	6
(United States) Harman	6	2	2

==== Section 8 ====
First round

Second round
6	(United States) Mangin	6	6	6
(United States) Lapman	1	2	1
(United States) Gilpin	6	2	3	1
(United States) Adelsberg	3	6	6	6
(United States) Low	1	2	3
(United States) Law	6	6	6
(United States) Podesta	1	1	3
(2)	(France) Destremau	6	6	6

Third round
6	(United States) Mangin	6	6	6
(United States) Adelsberg	1	2	3
(United States) Law	4	3	3
(2)	(France) Destremau	6	6	6

Fourth round
6	(United States) Mangin	4	6	6	3	6
(2)	(France) Destremau	6	0	3	6	3

Preceded by 1936 Wimbledon Championships	Grand Slams; Men's Singles	Succeeded by 1937 Australian Championships
