= 1938 U.S. National Championships – Men's singles =

Men's singles
- 1938 U.S. National Championships

Final
- Champion: (United States) Don Budge
- Runner-up: (United States) Gene Mako
- Score: 6–3, 6–8, 6–2, 6–1

Events
| Singles | men | women |
| Doubles | men | women |
| ← 1937 · | U.S. National Championships | · 1939 → |

Don Budge defeated Gene Mako in the final, 6–3, 6–8, 6–2, 6–1 to win the men's singles tennis title at the 1938 U.S. National Championships. He became the first player in tennis history to complete the Grand Slam.

== Seeds ==
The tournament used two lists of eight players for seeding the men's singles event; one for U.S. players and one for foreign players. Don Budge is the champion; others show the round in which they were eliminated.

U.S.

1. (United States) Don Budge (champion)
2. (United States) Bobby Riggs (fourth round)
3. (United States) Joseph Hunt (quarterfinals)
4. (United States) Sidney Wood (semifinals)
5. (United States) Elwood Cooke (third round)
6. (United States) Frank Kovacs (third round)
7. (United States) Frank Parker (fourth round)
8. (United States) Bryan Grant (quarterfinals)

Foreign

1. (Australia) John Bromwich (semifinals)
2. (Australia) Adrian Quist (fourth round)
3. (Kingdom of Yugoslavia) Franjo Punčec (fourth round)
4. (France) Bernard Destremau (first round)
5. (France) Yvon Petra (fourth round)
6. (Kingdom of Yugoslavia) Franjo Kukuljević (fourth round)
7. (Japan) Fumiteru Nakano (second round)
8. (United Kingdom) Charles Hare (fourth round)

== Draw ==
=== Key ===
- Q = Qualifier
- WC = Wild card
- LL = Lucky loser
- r = Retired

=== Finals ===
Quarterfinals
1 | (United States) Don Budge | 6 | 6 | 6
(Australia) Harry Hopman | 3 | 1 | 3
7 | (United States) Sidney Wood | 6 | 6 | 6
15 | (United States) Bryan Grant | 2 | 3 | 2
(United States) Gilbert Hunt | 5 | 6 | 6 | 0
(United States) Gene Mako | 7 | 1 | 8 | 6
5 | (United States) Joseph Hunt | 1 | 11 | 3 | 4
1 | (Australia) John Bromwich | 6 | 9 | 6 | 6

Semifinals
1 | (United States) Don Budge | 6 | 6 | 6
7 | (United States) Sidney Wood | 3 | 3 | 3
(United States) Gene Mako | 6 | 7 | 6
1 | (Australia) John Bromwich | 3 | 5 | 4

Final
1 | (United States) Don Budge | 6 | 6 | 6 | 6
(United States) Gene Mako | 3 | 8 | 2 | 1

=== Earlier rounds ===
==== Section 1 ====
First round

Second round
1 | (United States) Budge | 6 | 6 | 6
(United States) Van Horn | 0 | 0 | 1
(United States) Kamrath | 6 | 6 | 6
(United States) Kramer | 1 | 0 | 1
(United Kingdom) Finnigan | 7 | 0 | 4 | 4
(United States) Farrell | 5 | 6 | 6 | 6
(Australia) Schwartz | 4 | 5 | 12 | 7 | 8
15 | (United Kingdom) Hare | 6 | 7 | 10 | 5 | 10

Third round
1 | (United States) Budge | 6 | 7 | 9
(United States) Kamrath | 3 | 5 | 7
(United States) Farrell | 3 | 2 | 1
15 | (United Kingdom) Hare | 6 | 6 | 6

Fourth round
1 | (United States) Budge | 6 | 6 | 6
15 | (United Kingdom) Hare | 3 | 4 | 0

==== Section 2 ====
First round
(United States) Hartman | 7 | 4 | 6 | 6
(United States) Lowman | 5 | 6 | 2 | 3
(United States) McNeill | 6 | 4 | 6 | 6
7 | (France) Destremau | 2 | 6 | 1 | 3

Second round
9 | (United States) Cooke | 6 | 7 | 6
(United Kingdom) Godsell | 2 | 5 | 0
(Australia) Hopman | 6 | 7 | 6
(United States) Buxby | 3 | 5 | 4
(United States) McCauliff | 2 | r
(United States) Toley | 4
(United States) Hartman | 5 | 3 | 1
(United States) McNeill | 7 | 6 | 6

Third round
9 | (United States) Cooke | 2 | 6 | 4 | 8
(Australia) Hopman | 6 | 4 | 6 | 10
(United States) Toley | 1 | 4 | 1
(United States) McNeill | 6 | 6 | 6

Fourth round
(Australia) Hopman | 6 | 6 | 7
(United States) McNeill | 4 | 3 | 5

==== Section 3 ====
First round
7 | (United States) Wood | 6 | 6 | 6
(United States) McGehee | 4 | 1 | 4
(United States) Hall | 6 | 8 | 6
(United States) Davenport | 1 | 6 | 4
(United States) Mulloy | 7 | 6 | 6
(United States) Lewis | 5 | 1 | 4
(United States) Low | 6 | 6 | 6
(United States) Lay | 2 | 0 | 0
(United States) Gillespie | 6 | 4 | 2 | 6 | 6
(United States) Bushman | 4 | 6 | 6 | 4 | 4
(United States) Robertson | 6 | 4 | 7 | 6
(United States) Lavine | 4 | 6 | 5 | 3
(United States) Surface | 6 | 6 | 6
(France) Brugnon | 1 | 1 | 2
11 | (Kingdom of Yugoslavia) Kukuljević | 7 | 6 | 6
(United States) Prochaska | 5 | 1 | 0

Second round
7 | (United States) Wood | 9 | 4 | 1 | 6 | 6
(United States) Hall | 7 | 6 | 6 | 4 | 4
(United States) Mulloy | 7 | 6 | 6
(United States) Low | 5 | 3 | 1
(United States) Gillespie | 6 | 2 | 6 | 2 | 6
(United States) Robertson | 3 | 6 | 0 | 6 | 3
(United States) Surface | 1 | 3 | 1
11 | (Kingdom of Yugoslavia) Kukuljević | 6 | 6 | 6

Third round
7 | (United States) Wood | 6 | 6 | 4 | 6 | 6
(United States) Mulloy | 4 | 1 | 6 | 8 | 2
(United States) Gillespie | 2 | 2 | 1
11 | (Kingdom of Yugoslavia) Kukuljević | 6 | 6 | 6

Fourth round
7 | (United States) Wood | 8 | 6 | 6
11 | (Kingdom of Yugoslavia) Kukuljević | 6 | 4 | 3

==== Section 4 ====
First round
15 | (United States) Grant | 6 | 9 | 6
(United States) Everett | 4 | 7 | 4
(United States) Mattmann
(United States) Harman | w/o
(United States) Henderson | 6 | 6 | 5 | 9
(United States) Bowden | 3 | 4 | 7 | 7
(United States) Anderson | 6 | 6 | 4 | 6
(United States) Rood | 4 | 4 | 6 | 2
(United States) Bellis | 3 | 4 | 6 | 6 | 7
(United States) Anderson | 6 | 6 | 4 | 0 | 5
(United States) Ballagh | 6 | 7 | 6
(United States) Burt | 2 | 5 | 2
(United States) Umstaedter | 6 | 6 | 5 | 6
(United States) Johnson | 4 | 4 | 7 | 2
3 | (Australia) Quist | 6 | 6 | 6
(United States) Broida | 2 | 1 | 1

Second round
15 | (United States) Grant | 6 | 6 | 6
(United States) Mattmann | 2 | 2 | 2
(United States) Henderson | 1 | 3 | 6
(United States) Anderson | 6 | 6 | 8
(United States) Bellis | 6 | 11 | 2
(United States) Ballagh | 8 | 13 | 6
(United States) Umstaedter | 3 | 1 | 0
3 | (Australia) Quist | 6 | 6 | 6

Third round
15 | (United States) Grant | 6 | 6 | 4 | 6
(United States) Anderson | 3 | 1 | 6 | 1
(United States) Ballagh | 6 | 2 | 4 | 4
3 | (Australia) Quist | 3 | 6 | 6 | 6

Fourth round
15 | (United States) Grant | 6 | 4 | 6 | 7
3 | (Australia) Quist | 1 | 6 | 1 | 5

==== Section 5 ====
First round
3 | (United States) Riggs | 5 | 6 | 6 | 6
(United States) Lauck | 7 | 3 | 4 | 4
(United States) Guernsey | 6 | 6 | 6
(United States) Lubin | 2 | 1 | 3
(United Kingdom) Shayes | 6 | 6 | 6
(Belgium) Mouvet | 4 | 1 | 2
(United States) Bobbitt | 6 | 6 | 6
(United States) De Gray | 2 | 4 | 4
(United States) Jarvis | 6 | 4 | 6 | 6
(United States) Abrams | 1 | 6 | 3 | 1
(United States) Talbert | 6 | 6 | 6
(Canada) Baldwin | 1 | 3 | 3
(United States) Hunt | 6 | 4 | 6 | 5 | 6
(United States) Murphy | 4 | 6 | 4 | 7 | 4
13 | (Japan) Nakano | 3 | 6 | 3 | 6 | 6
(United States) Wetherell | 6 | 3 | 6 | 2 | 2

Second round
3 | (United States) Riggs | 5 | 6 | 6 | 6
(United States) Guernsey | 7 | 2 | 3 | 4
(United Kingdom) Shayes | 6 | 4 | 6 | 6
(United States) Bobbitt | 3 | 6 | 4 | 4
(United States) Jarvis | 4 | 3 | 6 | 6 | 6
(United States) Talbert | 6 | 6 | 4 | 2 | 2
(United States) Hunt | 6 | 1 | 6 | 6 | 6
13 | (Japan) Nakano | 8 | 6 | 3 | 3 | 3

Third round
3 | (United States) Riggs | 6 | 6 | 4 | 1 | 6
(United Kingdom) Shayes | 3 | 3 | 6 | 6 | 4
(United States) Jarvis | 3 | 2 | 2
(United States) Hunt | 6 | 6 | 6

Fourth round
3 | (United States) Riggs | 2 | 6 | 7 | 6 | 4
(United States) Hunt | 6 | 0 | 9 | 0 | 6

==== Section 6 ====
First round
11 | (United States) Kovacs | 6 | 6 | 9
(United Kingdom) Filby | 1 | 3 | 7
(Japan) Kuramitsu | 7 | 3 | 6 | 6
(United States) Hughes | 5 | 6 | 2 | 2
(United States) Mako | 6 | 6 | 6
(United States) Podesta | 1 | 2 | 2
(United States) Foreman
(United States) Stephens | w/o
(Australia) Weston | 6 | 6 | 7 | 5 | 8
(United States) Mangin | 1 | 4 | 9 | 7 | 6
(United States) Lynch | 6 | 6 | 6
(The Bahamas) Freisenbruch | 0 | 1 | 3
(United States) Kerdasha | 6 | 6 | 6
(United States) Lanas | 0 | 2 | 1
5 | (Kingdom of Yugoslavia) Punčec | 6 | 4 | 6 | 6
(Canada) Du Rivage | 1 | 6 | 1 | 4

Second round
11 | (United States) Kovacs | 6 | 4 | 3 | 6 | 7
(Japan) Kuramitsu | 3 | 6 | 6 | 4 | 5
(United States) Mako | 6 | 6 | 18
(United States) Foreman | 2 | 1 | 16
(Australia) Weston | 6 | 6 | 4 | 7
(United States) Lynch | 4 | 3 | 6 | 5
(United States) Kerdasha | 2 | 0 | 2
5 | (Kingdom of Yugoslavia) Punčec | 6 | 6 | 6

Third round
11 | (United States) Kovacs | 0 | 2 | 6
(United States) Mako | 6 | 6 | 8
(Australia) Weston | 0 | 2 | 2
5 | (Kingdom of Yugoslavia) Punčec | 6 | 6 | 6

Fourth round
(United States) Mako | 6 | 6 | 9
5 | (Kingdom of Yugoslavia) Punčec | 2 | 4 | 7

==== Section 7 ====
First round
5 | (United States) Hunt | 6 | 4 | 6 | 6
(Japan) Abe | 1 | 6 | 1 | 3

Second round
5 | (United States) Hunt | 6 | 8 | 6
(United States) Sabin | 1 | 6 | 3
(United States) Steele Jr. | 2 | 3 | 4
(United States) Dunn | 6 | 6 | 6
(United States) Murphy | 3 | 6 | 6 | 5 | 4
(United States) Fishbach | 6 | 4 | 4 | 7 | 6
(United States) Swanson | 4 | 5 | 1
9 | (France) Petra | 6 | 7 | 6

Third round
5 | (United States) Hunt | 6 | 6 | 6
(United States) Dunn | 2 | 3 | 4
(United States) Fishbach | 2 | 4 | 3
9 | (France) Petra | 6 | 6 | 6

Fourth round
5 | (United States) Hunt | 6 | 4 | 6 | 9
9 | (France) Petra | 4 | 6 | 4 | 7

==== Section 8 ====
First round

Second round
13 | (United States) Parker | 6 | 6 | 6
(United States) Lurie | 2 | 1 | 3
(United States) Hawley | 4 | 2 | 8
(United States) Rood | 6 | 6 | 10
(United States) Shields | 6 | 6 | 8
(United States) Sutter | 3 | 3 | 6
(United States) Ganzenmuller | 1 | 0 | 1
1 | (Australia) Bromwich | 6 | 6 | 6

Third round
13 | (United States) Parker | 6 | 6 | 7
(United States) Rood | 2 | 4 | 5
(United States) Shields | 6 | 12 | 8 | 2 | 2
1 | (Australia) Bromwich | 1 | 10 | 10 | 6 | 6

Fourth round
13 | (United States) Parker | 2 | 3 | 2
1 | (Australia) Bromwich | 6 | 6 | 6

| Preceded by 1938 Wimbledon Championships | Grand Slams; Men's Singles | Succeeded by 1939 Australian Championships |
