= 1936 U.S. National Championships (tennis) =

- Date: September 3–12
- Edition: 56th
- Category: Grand Slam (ITF)
- Surface: Grass / outdoor
- Location: Forest Hills, Queens; New York City, New York
- Venue: West Side Tennis Club

Champions

Men's singles
- (United Kingdom) Fred Perry

Women's singles
- (United States) Alice Marble

Men's doubles
- (United States) Don Budge / (United States) Gene Mako

Women's doubles
- (United States) Marjorie Gladman Van Ryn / (United States) Carolin Babcock

Mixed doubles
- (United States) Alice Marble / (United States) Gene Mako
← 1935 ·	U.S. National Championships	· 1937 →

The 1936 U.S. National Championships (now known as the US Open) was a tennis tournament that took place on the outdoor grass courts at the West Side Tennis Club, Forest Hills in New York City, New York. The tournament ran from September 3 until September 12. It was the 56th staging of the U.S. National Championships and the fourth Grand Slam tennis event of the year.

Fred Perry's victory would remain as the last Grand Slam tournament won by a British man until Andy Murray won the US Open in 2012, 76 years apart.

== Finals ==
=== Men's singles ===
(United Kingdom) Fred Perry defeated (United States) Don Budge 2–6, 6–2, 8–6, 1–6, 10–8

=== Women's singles ===
(United States) Alice Marble defeated (United States) Helen Jacobs 4–6, 6–3, 6–2

=== Men's doubles ===
(United States) Don Budge / (United States) Gene Mako defeated (United States) Wilmer Allison / (United States) John Van Ryn 6–4, 6–2, 6–4

=== Women's doubles ===
(United States) Carolin Babcock / (United States) Marjorie Gladman Van Ryn defeated (United States) Helen Hull Jacobs / (United States) Sarah Palfrey Cooke 9–7, 2–6, 6–4

=== Mixed doubles ===
(United States) Alice Marble / (United States) Gene Mako defeated (United States) Sarah Palfrey Cooke / (United States) Don Budge 6–3, 6–2

Preceded by 1936 Wimbledon Championships	Grand Slams	Succeeded by 1937 Australian Championships
