= Wilbur Hess =

American tennis player

- Full name: Wilbur Eugene Hess
- Country (sports): United States
- Born: January 15, 1913 Cleburne, Texas, U.S.
- Died: January 27, 1992 (aged 79) Harris County, Texas, U.S.
- Height: 5 ft 5 in (165 cm)
- Plays: Right-handed

Grand Slam singles results
- US Open: 4R (1935)

Wilbur Eugene Hess (January 15, 1913 – January 27, 1992) was an American tennis player.

Hess was born in Cleburne, Texas and attended Central High School, Fort Worth, Texas. After winning a state high school singles championship, Hess played varsity tennis for Rice Institute in Houston and as a senior won the 1935 national intercollegiate singles title. He reached the singles fourth round of the 1935 U.S. National Championships and had a best national ranking of 16th.

An investment banker by profession, Hess was a 1988 inductee into the Texas Tennis Hall of Fame. His elder brother Jake was a tennis player for Rice, as well an All-American in basketball.
