= Owen Anderson =

American tennis player

- Country (sports): United States
- Plays: Right-handed

Singles

Grand Slam singles results
- French Open: 4R (1938)
- Wimbledon: 3R (1938)
- US Open: 3R (1937, 1938, 1940)

Owen Anderson was an American tennis player of the 1930s and 1940s.

A collegiate tennis player for the UCLA Bruins, Anderson joined the university from Hollywood High School and was the 1937 Eastern Intercollegiate Champion, beating Gardnar Mulloy in the final. In 1938, his best year on tour, he won the Irish Championships over defending title holder George Lyttleton Rogers and beat local favourite Henner Henkel to win the Wiesbaden Championships. He reached the round of 16 at the 1938 French Championships and pushed Franjo Punčec (seeded fifth) to five sets in the third round of the 1938 Wimbledon Championships.

Anderson was married to British tennis player Rita Jarvis from 1940 to 1953.
