= William Harris (tennis) =

American tennis player

William "Bill" Harris (January 14, 1947 – March 8, 2002) was an American tennis player in the mid-20th Century.

Harris began playing tennis at the age of 8, and started playing tournaments at age 11. Harris was one of the best junior tennis players of the mid 20th century.

Born in West Palm Beach, Florida, he won the singles title at the Cincinnati Masters in 1968. He knocked Premjit Lall of India out in the semifinals and Allan Stone of Australia in the final for the title. He also reached the singles final in Cincinnati in 1966.

In junior tennis, Harris was the No. 1 ranked player in the World, and won the National Boys championship in the 14, 16 and 18 age divisions.

He attended Trinity University in San Antonio, Texas.

Harris practiced with his brother Robert Harris during the summers for nine hours a day or more at Howard Park. "I won't leave this park until I hit the ball 500 times back and forth without missing," Bill would tell his brother Robert. Bill reached the world record to be No. 1 ranked player in the world with the highest number of tennis balls hit on the backboard without missing. Bill said, "I caught the ball at 966 and people were amazed and stared at me like I was crazy, but I just didn't want to take that little girl's world record away of 967."

Harris was diagnosed with schizophrenia when he was eighteen and due to his illness retired from tennis at age twenty-two.

With the incapability of living on his own, Bill lived with his mother for a long while. On March 8, 2002, Bill Harris, aged 55, died at Columbia Hospital, a mental institution, in West Palm Beach, Florida. The cause of death was an allergic reaction to a medication.

Harris' father, Charles Harris, reached the Cincinnati singles final in 1936 before falling to Bobby Riggs, 6–1, 6–3, 6–1.
