= Don Budge =

American tennis player (1915–2000)

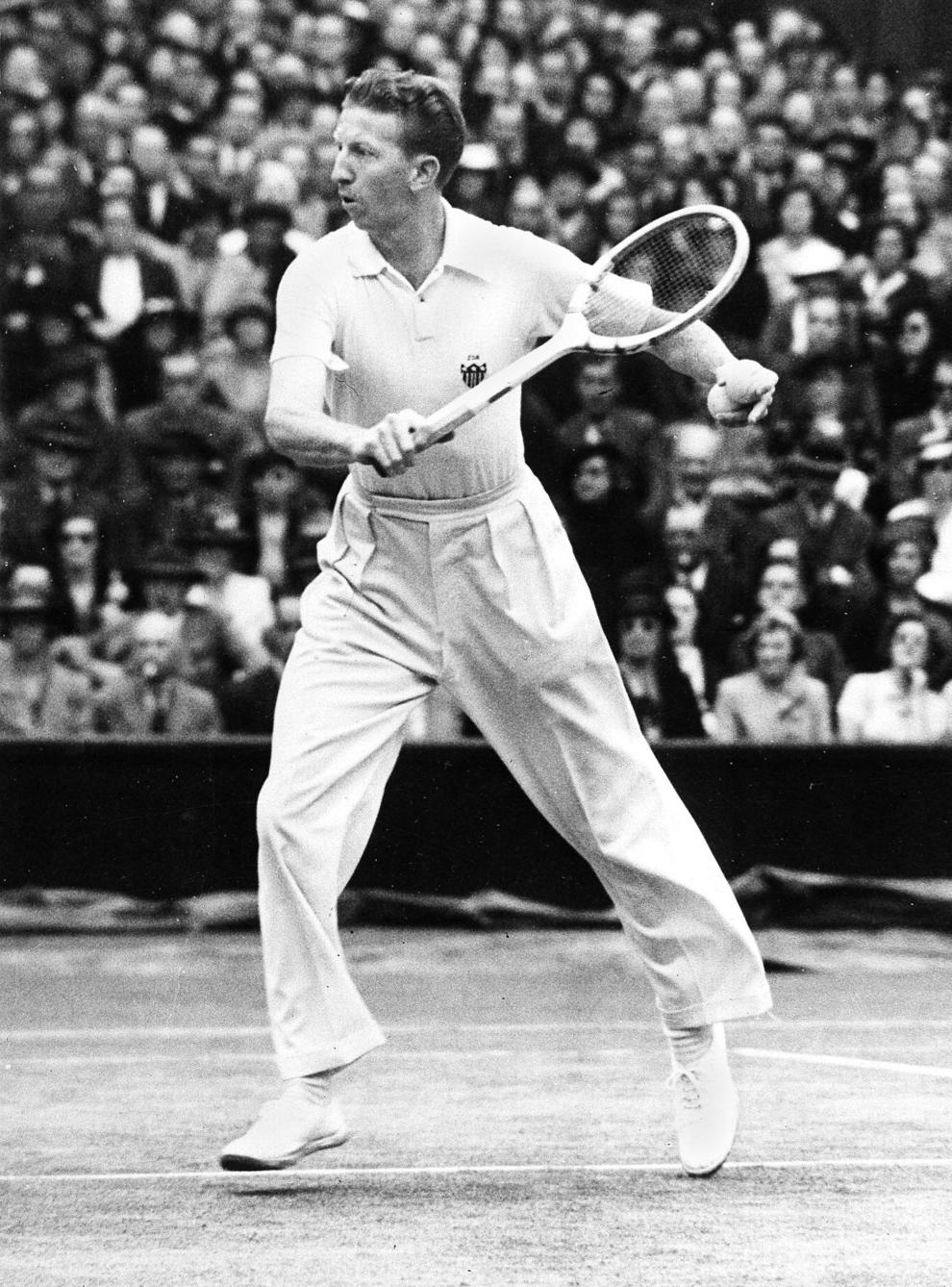
- Budge at Wimbledon, 1938
- Full name: John Donald Budge
- Country (sports): United States
- Born: June 13, 1915 Oakland, California, U.S.
- Died: January 26, 2000 (aged 84) Scranton, Pennsylvania, U.S.
- Height: 6 ft 1 in (185 cm)
- Turned pro: 1938 (amateur tour from 1932)
- Retired: 1961
- Plays: Right-handed (one-handed backhand)
- Int. Tennis HoF: 1964 (member page)

Singles
- Career record: 649-297 (68.6%)
- Career titles: 43
- Highest ranking: No. 1 (1937, A. Wallis Myers)

Grand Slam singles results
- Australian Open: W (1938)
- French Open: W (1938)
- Wimbledon: W (1937, 1938)
- US Open: W (1937, 1938)

Other tournaments
- Professional majors
- US Pro: W (1940, 1942)
- Wembley Pro: W (1939)
- French Pro: W (1939)

Doubles
- Highest ranking: No. 1 (1942, Ray Bowers)

Grand Slam doubles results
- Australian Open: SF (1938)
- Wimbledon: W (1937, 1938)
- US Open: W (1936, 1938)

Grand Slam mixed doubles results
- Wimbledon: W (1937, 1938)
- US Open: W (1937, 1938)

John Donald Budge (June 13, 1915 – January 26, 2000) was an American tennis player. He is most famous as the first tennis player—male or female—to win all four Grand Slam tournaments in one year and complete the Grand Slam. Budge was the second man to complete the career Grand Slam, after Fred Perry. He won ten majors, of which six were Grand Slam events (consecutively, a men's record) and four Pro Slams, the latter achieved on three different surfaces. Budge is considered to have had one of the best backhands in the history of tennis, with most observers rating it better than that of later player Ken Rosewall.

Budge is also the only man to have achieved the Triple Crown (winning singles, men's doubles and mixed doubles at the same tournament) on three separate occasions (Wimbledon in 1937 and 1938, and the US Championships in 1938), and the only man to have achieved it twice in one year. Budge was the world Number 1 amateur in 1937 and 1938 and world Number 1 professional in 1939, 1940 and 1942.

== Early life ==
Budge was born in Oakland, California, the son of Scottish immigrant and former footballer John "Jack" Budge, who had played several matches for the Rangers reserve team before emigrating to the United States, and Pearl Kincaid Budge. Growing up, he played a variety of sports before taking up tennis at the age of 13 at the urging of his elder brother, Lloyd, who played tennis for the University of California team. He also had an elder sister. He was red-headed, tall and slim, and his height would eventually help what is still considered one of the most powerful serves of all time. Budge studied at the University of California, Berkeley, in late 1933 but left to play tennis with the U.S. Davis Cup auxiliary team.

== Amateur career ==
Accustomed to hard-court surfaces in his native California, Budge had difficulty playing on the grass courts in the east.

1932

Budge reached the semi-finals of the West Canada championships in July, where he lost in five sets to Henry Prusoff. "The Oakland youngster carried brawny Hank Prusoff of Seattle to five sets, surprising most of the onlookers, including the tournament favorite from Puget Sound...Budge playing a calm and collected game all the way and letting the hardhitting Prusoff make the errors. The chop stroke of the Seattle man worked to perfection, particularly In the last set, and he always seemed to have something in reserve."

1933

At the Del Monte championships in May, Budge beat Wallace Bates in straight sets in the final. In July, Budge beat John Murio in the final of the California State championship. "Tennis fans will be talking for days of the men's singles event and of Budge, whom the experts candidly admit "has everything". Not only has he the strokes of a champion, but the presence and strategy of one far beyond his years. Murio's most burning drives failed to ruffle one of the flaming red hairs on his head". In the final of the Colorado championships in Denver in July, Budge beat Jack Tidball in five sets.

1934

Budge beat Bud Chandler in the final in five sets to retain his California State championship title in June. "Chandler went to the net often throughout the match, while Budge elected to play a baseline game almost exclusively, going to the webbing only when forced to by chop or cross court shots; Chandler, exhausted after his gruelling five-set match with John Murio in the semi-final on Saturday, fought largely on his nerve against the Champion, and at the end of yesterday's strenuous competition again was completely exhausted."

1935

Budge beat Gene Mako in the final of the Palm Springs tournament in April. Budge beat Frank Shields in the final of the Newport Casino tournament in August. In the final of the Pacific Southwest tournament in September, Budge was leading 2 sets to 1 against Roderich Menzel, when Menzel retired, in order to preserve his energy for a mixed doubles match. Budge beat Bobby Riggs in the final of the Pacific Coast championships in October.

1936

In January, Budge beat Walter Senior in the final of the Northern California indoor event. In April, Budge won the North and south tournament at Pinehurst beating Hal Surface in three-straight sets for the loss of just one game with a "superb exhibition of speed and control". In June, Budge beat Dave Jones in the final of the Queen's Club tournament. Budge beat Riggs in the final of the Eastern championships in August. Budge beat Perry in the final of the Pacific Southwest tournament in September. In October, Budge beat Walter Senior in the final of the Pacific Coast championships. In December, Budge beat Riggs in the final of the Southern California midwinter tournament.

1937

In February, Budge beat Bryan Grant in the final of the Miami tournament. In June, Budge beat Bunny Austin in the final at the Queen's Club tournament. "Seldom has a star of Austin's standing absorbed so crushing a defeat in full view of the public." Budge swept Wimbledon, winning the singles (beating Gottfried von Cramm in straight sets in the final), the men's doubles title with Gene Mako, and the mixed doubles crown with Alice Marble. In August, Budge beat Riggs in the final of the Newport Casino tournament. Budge beat von Cramm in the U. S. Championships final which "was a strange see-saw affair in which Budge twice lapsed from his normally brilliant genius guided game". Budge beat von Cramm again in the final of the Pacific Southwest tournament in September. Budge beat Riggs in the final of the Pacific Coast tournament in October. In December Budge won the Victorian championships beating John Bromwich in the final in a match in which "the hot, humid weather proved trying for the players". Budge gained the most fame for his match that year against von Cramm in the Davis Cup inter-zone finals against Germany. Trailing 1–4 in the final set, he came back to win 8–6. His victory allowed the US team to advance and to then win the Davis Cup for the first time in 12 years. For his efforts, he was named Associated Press Male Athlete of the Year and he became the first tennis player ever to be voted the James E. Sullivan Award as America's top amateur athlete. Budge was ranked World No. 1 amateur by A. Wallis Myers of The Daily Telegraph, Mervyn Weston, Daily Telegraph (Sydney), Pierre Gillou, Ned Potter, The Times, Harry Hopman, Alfred Chave, The Telegraph (Brisbane) and Pierre Goldschmidt, L'Auto.

1938

In 1938, Budge dominated amateur tennis defeating John Bromwich in the Australian final, Roderick Menzel in the French final, Henry "Bunny" Austin at Wimbledon, where he never lost a set (he also won the doubles and mixed doubles), and Gene Mako in the U.S. Championships final (winning doubles and mixed doubles too), to become the first person to win the Grand Slam in tennis. He was the youngest man in history to complete the "Career Grand Slam" (the four majors in one's career) and "Full Grand Slam" (four majors held at one time (in row)). He completed that on June 11, 1938, in winning the French singles, two days before his 23rd birthday. His record stood till 2026 when Carlos Alcaraz became the youngest. Budge beat Ladislav Hecht in the final of the Czech championships in Prague in July. Budge beat Sidney Wood in the final of the Newport Casino tournament in August. Budge was ranked World No. 1 amateur by Ray Bowers, A. Wallis Myers of The Daily Telegraph, Pierre Gillou, Ned Potter, Pierre Goldschmidt, L'Auto, The Times (London), F. Gordon Lowe of The Scotsman, Dr. G. H. McElhone of The Sydney Morning Herald, "International" of The Referee, Mervyn Weston, Daily Telegraph (Sydney), Jack Crawford and Alfred Chave, The Telegraph (Brisbane).

== Professional career ==
1939

Budge turned professional in October 1938 after winning the Grand Slam, and thereafter played mostly head-to-head matches. In 1939, he beat the two reigning kings of professional tennis, Ellsworth Vines, 22 matches to 17, and Fred Perry, 28 matches to 8. That year, he also won two major pro tournaments, the French Pro Championship over Vines and the Wembley Pro tournament over Hans Nüsslein. He also finished in first place on the European tour in the summer that also featured Vines, Tilden and Stoefen. Budge was ranked world No. 1 pro by Bowers, Didier Poulain of L'Auto and Alfred Chave, The Telegraph (Brisbane).

1940

There was no World series professional tour in 1940 but seven principal tournaments. Budge kept his world crown by winning four of these events: the Southeastern Pro at Miami Beach (beating Perry in the final), the North & South Pro at Pinehurst (beating Dick Skeen in the final), the National Open at White Sulphur Springs (beating Bruce Barnes in the final) and the United States Pro Championship (beating Perry in the final). Budge was ranked world No. 1 pro by Bowers.

On July 29, 1940, Budge played an exhibition match in front of 2,000 people at the Cosmopolitan Club in Harlem against the American Tennis Association's top player Jimmie McDaniel. This is believed to be the first interracial tennis match played before a large audience to take place in the United States.

1941

In 1941, Budge played another major tour beating the 48-year-old Bill Tilden, the outcome being 47–6 plus one tie. Budge (who had only recently left hospital) lost his opening match in the U. S. Pro championships to John Faunce. "You see, Don was in the hospital a couple of weeks ago fell down some stairs and banged up his nose and left ear. He didn't have his court legs today and naturally that was my cue to make him run and. believe me, I never hit better drop shots in my life than I hit today. I could put that ball on a dime!" said Faunce afterwards.

1942

In 1942, Budge won his last major tour over Bobby Riggs, Frank Kovacs, Perry and Les Stoefen. He also won the U.S. Pro at Forest Hills, crushing Riggs in three straight sets in the final. The crowd booed when Riggs was denied a request to wear spiked shoes. After that many of the top pros, including Budge, became involved in World War 2. Budge was ranked world No. 1 pro by Bowers and by the USPLTA.

== Military service ==
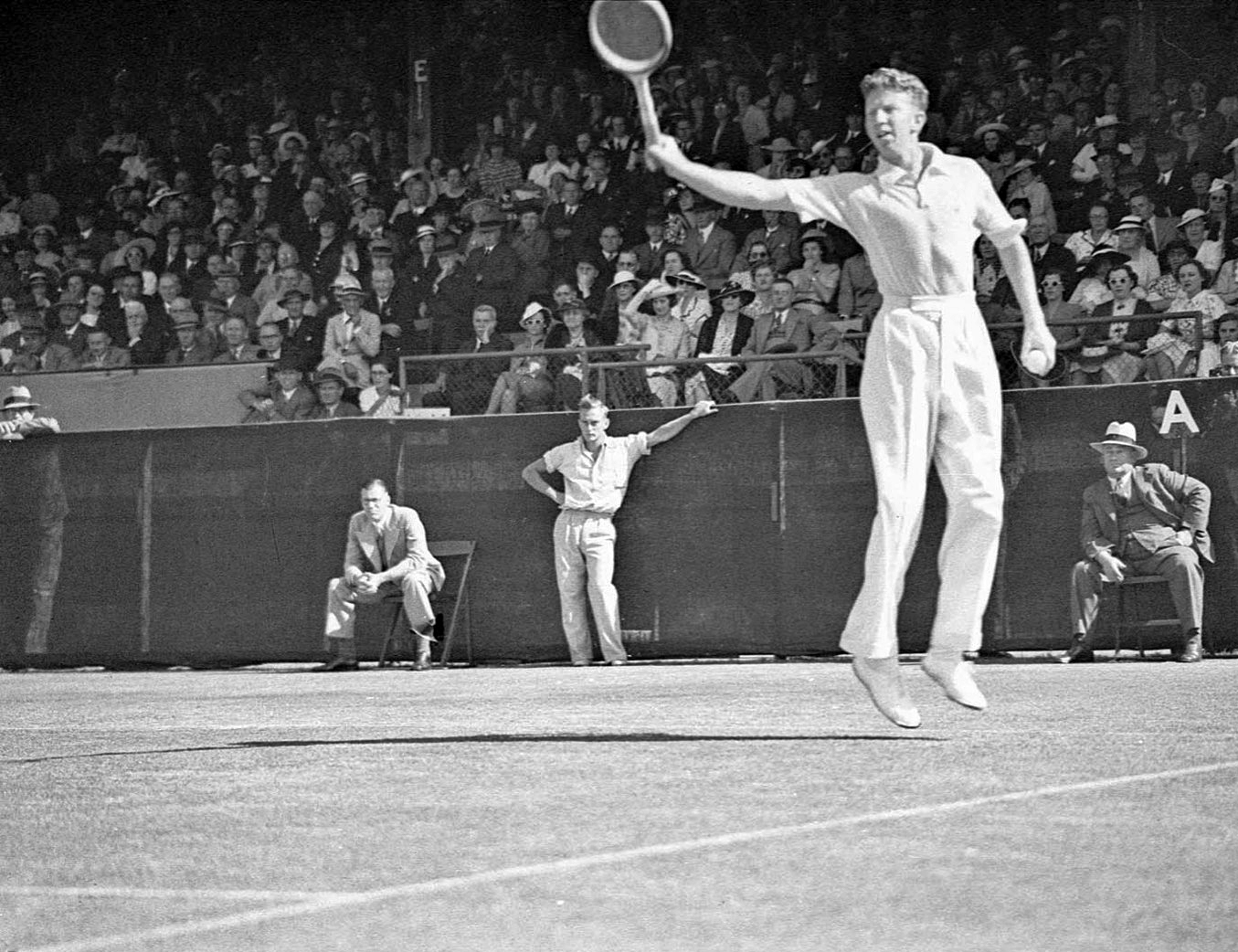
Don Budge at the White City Stadium, Sydney in December 1937

In 1942, Budge joined the United States Army Air Forces to serve in World War II. At the beginning of 1943, in an obstacle course, he tore a muscle in his shoulder. In his book 'A Tennis Memoir' page 144 he said:

The tear didn't heal, and the scar tissue that was formed complicated the injury and made it even serious. Nevertheless ... I was able to carry on with my military duties ... as long as two years afterwards, in the spring of '45, I was given a full month's medical leave so that I could go to Berkeley and have an osteopath, Dr. J. LeRoy Near, work with me.

This permanently hindered his playing abilities. During his wartime duty he played some exhibitions for the troops in particular during the summer 1945 with the war winding down, Budge played in a US Army (Budge-Frank Parker) – US Navy (Riggs – Wayne Sabin) competition under the Davis Cup format: the main confrontations were the Budge-Riggs meetings knowing that both Americans were the best players in the world in 1942 just before being enlisted in the U.S. Armed Forces and again when they came back to the professional circuit in 1945. In the first match, on the island of Guam, Budge trounced Riggs. On the island of Peleliu, Budge won again. Riggs won the next two matches against Budge, at the island of Ulithi and the island of Saipan. Budge confided in Parker his disbelief at losing two matches in a row to Riggs. In the fifth and final match on the island of Tinian, scheduled for the first week of August 1945, Riggs defeated Budge. This was the first time Budge had been beaten by Riggs in a series (Riggs also won three matches out of five against the amateur Parker, both holder and future titlist of the U.S. Amateur Nationals at Forest Hills) thereby giving Riggs an important psychological edge in their forthcoming peacetime tours.

== Post war ==
1946

In 1946, Budge lost narrowly to Riggs in their U.S. tour, 24 matches to 22. Riggs thereby established himself as the world No. 1. According to Kramer,

Bobby played to Budge's shoulder, lobbed him to death, won the first twelve matches, thirteen out of the first fourteen, and then hung on to beat Budge, twenty-four matches to twenty-two. At the age of thirty, Don Budge was very nearly a has-been. That was the way pro tennis worked then.

The hierarchy was confirmed at the U.S. Pro, held at Forest Hills where Riggs easily defeated Budge in the last round. There was a tournament circuit in 1946. Budge won events at Memphis in June (beating Riggs in the final), Richmond in June (beating Riggs in the final), Philadelphia in July (beating Van Horn in the final) and San Francisco in October (beating Riggs in the final). Budge finished second in the points table behind Riggs.

1947

In 1947 Budge beat Riggs in two European tours, one early in the year and one in the summer. According to Riggs, Budge still had a very powerful, very deadly overhead and rather than winning outright very many points with his lobbing, he actually achieved two other goals: his constant lobbing led Budge to play somewhat deeper at the net than he would have otherwise, thereby making it easier for Riggs to hit passing shots for winners; and the constant lobbing helped to wear Budge down by forcing him to run back to the backline time after time. Riggs stayed the pro king by defeating Budge in the U.S. Pro final in five sets, so Riggs would face Kramer on the big tour in 1948.

1948-1961

Budge reached two more U.S. Pro finals, losing in 1949 at Forest Hills to Riggs and in 1953 in Cleveland to Pancho Gonzales. In 1954, Budge recorded his last significant victory in a North American tour with Pancho Gonzales, Pancho Segura, and Frank Sedgman when, in Los Angeles, he defeated Gonzales, by then the best player in the world. In April 1955 Budge won the U. S. Pro Clay Court Championships at Fort Lauderdale beating Riggs in the final. Budge was playing very infrequently by now. He continued playing until 1961, when he lost in the Southern Pro final to Jack Arkinstall in straight sets. "He still hits a wonderful backhand, but he's five years older than I am and I guess I just got around too fast for him," said Arkinstall.

== Later years and honors ==
He appeared on the Ed Sullivan Show in 1948 and the Steve Allen Plymouth Show in 1951. He appeared as himself in the 1953 film Pat and Mike.

After retiring from competition, Budge turned to coaching and conducted tennis clinics for children. According to Riggs' 1949 autobiography as of that writing, Budge owned a laundry in New York with Sidney Wood as well as a bar in Oakland. A gentleman on and off the court, he was much in demand for speaking engagements and endorsed various lines of sporting goods. With the advent of the Open era in tennis, in 1968 he returned to play at Wimbledon in the Veteran's doubles. In 1973, at the age of 58, he and former champion Frank Sedgman teamed up to win the Veteran's Doubles Championship at Wimbledon before an appreciative crowd.

Budge was the resident tennis pro at the Montego Bay Racquet Club in Jamaica in 1977. In October 1978 he became the tennis pro at the Cambridge Towers Hotel in Las Vegas. After a few months he was terminated but he sued the owner for breach of his five-year contract and was awarded $455,041.

Budge was inducted into the National Lawn Tennis Hall of Fame, now the International Tennis Hall of Fame, at Newport, Rhode Island, in 1964. He was elected to the Bay Area Sports Hall of Fame in 1992. The once-gravel tennis courts at Bushrod Park in north Oakland, which he played on as a youth, are named for him.

He is referenced in the 1977 Broadway musical Annie in the song "I Think I'm Gonna Like It Here." When Annie says she's never picked up a tennis racket, Daddy Warbucks' secretary tells an underling: "Have an instructor here at noon. Oh, and get that Don Budge fellow if he's available." The reference is technically an anachronism, as the story is set in 1933, at which time Budge was an undergraduate at Berkeley and had not yet achieved prominence.

== Personal life ==
He wed Deirdre Conselman (1922–1978), the daughter of screenwriter and cartoonist William Conselman, at St. Chrysostom's Episcopal Church in Chicago on June 2, 1941. In his later years he lived in Dingman's Ferry, Pennsylvania, with his second wife, Loriel.

In December 1999, Budge was injured in an automobile accident from which he never fully recovered. He died on January 26, 2000, at a nursing home in Scranton, Pennsylvania, aged 84. He had two sons, David and Jeffrey.

== Assessment ==
Budge is a consensus pick for being one of the greatest players of all time. He had a graceful, overpowering backhand that he hit with a slight amount of topspin and that, combined with his quickness and his serve, made him the best player of his time. E. Digby Baltzell wrote in 1994 that Budge and Laver "have usually been rated at the top of any all-time World Champions list, Budge having a slight edge." Will Grimsley wrote in 1971 that Budge "is considered by many to be foremost among the all-time greats." Paul Metzler, in his analysis of ten of the all-time greats, singles out Budge as the greatest player before World War II, and gives him second place overall behind Jack Kramer. In 1978, Ellsworth Vines ranked his all-time top 10 in Tennis Myth and Method and rated Budge number one.

Jack Kramer himself has written that Budge was, in the long run, the greatest player who ever lived although Ellsworth Vines topped him when at the height of his game. Kramer said:

Budge was the best of all. He owned the most perfect set of mechanics and he was the most consistent... Don was so good that when he toured with Sedgman, Gonzales, and Segura in 1954 at the age of 38, none of those guys could get to the net consistently off his serve—and Sedgman, as quick a man who ever played the game, was in his absolute prime then. Don could keep them pinned to the baseline with his backhand too.

In his 1979 autobiography, Kramer considered the best player ever to have been either Don Budge (for consistent play) or Ellsworth Vines (at the height of his game). The next four best were, chronologically, Bill Tilden, Fred Perry, Bobby Riggs, and Pancho Gonzales. All of these sources were written, after Rod Laver completed his second, and Open, Grand Slam in 1969.

In 1983, Fred Perry ranked the greatest male players of all time and put them in to two categories, before World War 2 and after. Perry's pre-WWII nominees all below Tilden and excluding himself "Budge Cochet Ellsworth Vines 'so powerful!' Gottfried von Cramm Jack Crawford Jan Sato Jean Borotra Bunny Austin Roderick Menzel Baron Umberto de Morpurgo".

In early 1986 Inside Tennis, a magazine edited in Northern California, devoted parts of four issues to a lengthy article called "Tournament of the Century", an imaginary tournament to determine the greatest of all time. 25 players in all were named by the 37 experts in their lists of the ten best. The magazine then ranked them in descending order by total number of points assigned. The top eight players in overall points, with their number of first-place votes, were: Rod Laver (9), John McEnroe (3), Don Budge (4), Jack Kramer (5), Björn Borg (6), Pancho Gonzales (1), Bill Tilden (6), and Lew Hoad (1). McEnroe was still an active player and Laver and Borg had only recently retired. In the imaginary tournament, Laver beat McEnroe in the finals in five sets.

In 1988, a panel consisting of Bud Collins, Cliff Drysdale, and Butch Buchholz ranked their top five male tennis players of all time. Drysdale listed Budge number three behind Laver and Borg. Buchholz and Collins did not include Budge on their lists.

More recently, an Associated Press poll conducted in 1999 ranked Budge fifth, following Laver, Pete Sampras, Tilden, and Borg. Even more recently, in 2006, a panel of former players and experts was asked by TennisWeek to assemble a draw for a fantasy tournament to determine who was the greatest of all time. The top eight seeds were Roger Federer, Laver, Sampras, Borg, Tilden, Budge, Kramer, and McEnroe.

In the early years of the 21st century, Sidney Wood compiled his list of the Greatest Players of All Time (later published posthumously in a memoir "The Wimbledon final that never was and other tennis tales from a bygone era"). Wood first entered Wimbledon in 1927 and won the title in 1931. "From that time on, through to the late 1970s (doubles only towards the end), I was privileged to compete against virtually every top player in the world" said Wood. Wood ranked Budge number one in his list, saying the decision was a "no-brainer" and said Budge was "recognized by his peers as the one player to have commanded not only every shot in the book for every surface, but also to have been blessed with the single most destructive tennis weapon ever- a bludgeon backhand struck with a sixteen ounce 'Paul Bunyan' bat."

== Major finals ==
=== Grand Slam tournaments ===
==== Singles: 7 (6 titles, 1 runner-up) ====
Result	Year	Championship	Surface	Opponent	Score
Loss	1936	U.S. Championships	Grass	(United Kingdom) Fred Perry	2–6, 6–2, 8–6, 1–6, 10–8
Win	1937	Wimbledon	Grass	(Nazi Germany) Gottfried von Cramm	6–3, 6–4, 6–2
Win	1937	U.S. Championships (2)	Grass	(Nazi Germany) Gottfried von Cramm	6–1, 7–9, 6–1, 3–6, 6–1
Win	1938	Australian Championships	Grass	(Australia) John Bromwich	6–4, 6–2, 6–1
Win	1938	French Championships	Clay	(Czechoslovakia) Roderich Menzel	6–3, 6–2, 6–4
Win	1938	Wimbledon (2)	Grass	(United Kingdom) Bunny Austin	6–1, 6–0, 6–3
Win	1938	U.S. Championships (3)	Grass	(United States) Gene Mako	6–3, 6–8, 6–2, 6–1

==== Doubles: 7 (4 titles, 3 runner-ups) ====
Result	Year	Championship	Surface	Partner	Opponents	Score
Loss	1935	U.S. Championships	Grass	(United States) Gene Mako	(United States) Wilmer Allison (United States) John Van Ryn	2–6, 3–6, 6–2, 6–3, 1–6
Win	1936	U.S. Championships	Grass	(United States) Gene Mako	(United States) Wilmer Allison (United States) John Van Ryn	6–4, 6–2, 6–4
Win	1937	Wimbledon	Grass	(United States) Gene Mako	(United Kingdom) Pat Hughes (United Kingdom) Raymond Tuckey	6–0, 6–4, 6–8, 6–1
Loss	1937	U.S. Championships	Grass	(United States) Gene Mako	(Nazi Germany) Henner Henkel (Nazi Germany) Gottfried von Cramm	4–6, 5–7, 4–6
Loss	1938	French Championships	Clay	(United States) Gene Mako	(French Third Republic) Bernard Destremau (French Third Republic) Yvon Petra	6–3, 3–6, 7–9, 1–6
Win	1938	Wimbledon	Grass	(United States) Gene Mako	(Nazi Germany) Henner Henkel (Nazi Germany) George von Metaxa	6–4, 6–3, 3–6, 8–6
Win	1938	U.S. Championships	Grass	(United States) Gene Mako	(Australia) John Bromwich (Australia) Adrian Quist	6–3, 6–2, 6–1

=== Pro Slam tournaments ===
==== Singles: 8 (4 titles, 4 runner-ups) ====
Result	Year	Championship	Opponent	Score
Win	1939	Wembley Pro	(Nazi Germany) Hans Nüsslein	13–11, 2–6, 6–4
Win	1939	French Pro Championship	(United States) Ellsworth Vines	6–2, 7–5, 6–3
Win	1940	US Pro Championships	(United Kingdom) Fred Perry	6–3, 5–7, 6–4, 6–3
Win	1942	US Pro Championships	(United States) Bobby Riggs	6–2, 6–2, 6–2
Loss	1946	US Pro Championships	(United States) Bobby Riggs	3–6, 1–6, 1–6
Loss	1947	US Pro Championships	(United States) Bobby Riggs	6–3, 3–6, 8–10, 6–4, 3–6
Loss	1949	US Pro Championships	(United States) Bobby Riggs	7–9, 6–3, 3–6, 5–7
Loss	1953	US Pro Championships	(United States) Pancho Gonzales	6–4, 4–6, 5–7, 2–6

== Performance timeline ==
Don Budge joined professional tennis in 1939 and was unable to compete in the Grand Slam tournaments.

Key
W	F	SF	QF	#R	RR	Q#	DNQ	A	NH

(W) winner; (F) finalist; (SF) semifinalist; (QF) quarterfinalist; (#R) rounds 4, 3, 2, 1; (RR) round-robin stage; (Q#) qualification round; (DNQ) did not qualify; (A) absent; (NH) not held; (SR) strike rate (events won / competed); (W–L) win–loss record.

Tournament	Amateur career					Professional career																			Titles / Played	Career win–loss	Career win %
Tournament	'34	'35	'36	'37	'38	'39	'40	'41	'42	'43	'44	'45	'46	'47	'48	'49	'50	'51		'52	'53	'54		'55	Titles / Played	Career win–loss	Career win %
Grand Slam tournaments																									6 / 11	58–5	92.06
Australian Championships	A	A	A	A	W	A	A	Not Held					A	A	A	A	A	A		A	A	A		A	1 / 1	5–0	100.00
French Championships	A	A	A	A	W	A	Not Held						A	A	A	A	A	A		A	A	A		A	1 / 1	6–0	100.00
Wimbledon	A	SF	SF	W	W	A	Not Held						A	A	A	A	A	A		A	A	A		A	2 / 4	24–2	92.31
U.S. Championships	4R	QF	F	W	W	A	A	A	A	A	A	A	A	A	A	A	A	A		A	A	A		A	2 / 5	23–3	88.46
Pro Slam tournaments																									4 / 18	40–14	74.07
U.S. Pro	A	A	A	A	A	A	W	1R	W	A	NH	A	F	F	SF	F	A	SF	A	SF	F	SF	A	QF	2 / 12	27–10	72.97
French Pro	A	A	A	A	A	W	Not Held																		1 / 1	3–0	100.00
Wembley Pro	A	A	NH	A	NH	W	Not Held									SF	SF	A		SF	SF	NH			1 / 5	10–4	71.43
Total:																									10 / 29	98–19	83.76

== Single titles ==
=== Amateur era ===
Singles (1934–1938) : 26 titles

Date		Event	Surface	Runner up	Score
1934	June 18	California State Championships, Berkeley	Hard	(United States) Edward Chandler	6–4, 5–7, 7–5, 3–6, 7–5
1935	March 26	Palm Springs Invitation, California	Hard	(United States) Gene Mako	6–2, 6–2
1935	August 12	Casino Trophy, Newport	Grass	(United States) Frank Shields	6–3, 5–7, 3–6, 8–6, 6–1
1935	September 16	Pacific Southwest Championships, Los Angeles	Hard	(First Czechoslovak Republic) Roderich Menzel	1–6, 11–9, 6–3 ab.
1935	September 23	Pacific Coast Championships, Berkeley	Hard	(United States) Bobby Riggs	6–0, 6–2, 7–9, 6–4
1936	January 13	Northern California Indoor Championships, San Francisco	Hard (i)	(United States) Walter Senior	6–4, 6–1, 6–3
1936	April 13	North & South Championships, Pinehurst	Clay	(United States) Hal Surface	6–0, 6–0, 6–1
1936	June 8	London Championships, London	Grass	(United States) David Jones	6–4, 6–3
1936	August 3	Eastern Grass Court Championships, Rye	Grass	(United States) Bobby Riggs	6–8, 6–2, 6–4, 6–3
1936	September 13	Pacific Southwest Championships, Los Angeles	Hard	(United Kingdom) Fred Perry	6–2, 4–6, 6–2, 6–3
1936	September 18	Pacific Coast Championships, Berkeley	Hard	(United States) Walter Senior	6–1, 6–0, 6–3
1936	December 26	California Mid-Winter Championships, Los Angeles	Hard	(United States) Bobby Riggs	6–4, 6–4
1937	February 1	City of Miami Championships, Miami	Hard	(United States) Brian Grant	6–3, 2–6, 6–4, 6–4
1937	June 14	London Championships, London	Grass	(United Kingdom) Henry Austin	6–1, 6–2
1937	June 22	Wimbledon, London	Grass	(Germany) Gottfried von Cramm	6–3, 6–4, 6–2
1937	August 16	Casino Trophy, Newport	Grass	(United States) Bobby Riggs	6–4, 6–8, 6–1, 6–2
1937	September 2	U.S. National Championships, Forest Hills	Grass	(Germany) Gottfried von Cramm	6–1, 7–9, 6–1, 3–6, 6–1
1937	September 20	Pacific Southwest Championships, Los Angeles	Hard	(Germany) Gottfried von Cramm	2–6, 7–5, 6–4, 7–5
1937	October 4	Pacific Coast Championships, Berkeley	Hard	(United States) Bobby Riggs	4–6, 6–3, 6–2, 6–4
1937	December 6	Victorian Championships, Melbourne	Grass	(Australia) John Bromwich	8–6, 6–3, 9–7
1938	January 21	Australian Championships, Adelaide	Grass	(Australia) John Bromwich	6–4, 6–2, 6–1
1938	June 2	French Championships, Paris	Clay	(First Czechoslovak Republic) Roderich Menzel	6–3, 6–2, 6–4
1938	June 20	Wimbledon, London	Grass	(United Kingdom) Henry Austin	6–1, 6–0, 6–3
1938	July 5	Czechoslovakian International Championships, Prague	Clay	(First Czechoslovak Republic) Ladislav Hecht	6–1, 6–4, 6–4
1938	August 15	Casino Trophy, Newport	Grass	(United States) Sidney Wood	6–3, 6–3, 6–2
1938	September 8	U.S. National Championships, Forest Hills	Grass	(United States) Gene Mako	6–3, 6–8, 6–2, 6–1

== Records ==
- These records were attained in pre-Open Era of tennis.
- Records in **bold** indicate peer-less achievements.

Championship	Years	Record accomplished	Player tied	Ref
Grand Slam tournaments	1938	Calendar Year Grand Slam winning all 4 Major singles titles	Rod Laver	
Grand Slam tournaments	1937–38	6 consecutive Grand Slam singles titles	**Stands alone**	
Grand Slam tournaments	1938	Youngest men's player in tennis history to achieve the Grand Slam (23 years, 3 months)	**Stands alone**	
Grand Slam tournaments	1937–38	3 times achieved the "Triple Crown" winning singles, doubles and mixed doubles titles at one Grand Slam event Wimbledon (1937–38) US Championships (1938)	**Stands alone**	
Grand Slam tournaments	1937–38	37 match win streak in consecutive tournaments	**Stands alone**	
Grand Slam tournaments	1934–38	92.06% (58–5) Career winning percentage	**Stands alone**	
Grand Slam tournaments	1938	100% (24–0) Single Season winning percentage	Rod Laver; Jimmy Connors	
Grand Slam tournaments	1934–38	91.22% (52–5) Career Grass Court winning percentage	**Stands alone**	
All tournaments	1937–38	14 consecutive tournament wins	**Stands alone**	

== See also ==
- All-time tennis records – men's singles
- Open Era tennis records – men's singles
