= Laura Mako =

American interior designer and decorator (1916–2019)

- Born: Laura Mae Church; May 29, 1916; Leonardtown, Maryland
- Died: May 5, 2019 (aged 102)
- Occupation: Interior decorator
- Spouse: Gene Mako

Laura Mako (May 29, 1916 – May 5, 2019) was an American interior designer and decorator known for decorating the homes of many Hollywood stars.

== History ==
Her family was from Saint Mary's County, Maryland. She attended Georgetown Visitation Preparatory School and graduated from New York School of Interior Design.

She did interior design for Bob Hope, Henry Mancini and Dean Martin. She designed the interiors of Betty and Gerald Ford's post-Presidency home in Rancho Mirage, California with a style the New York Times called "Palm Springs via Palm Beach," and Town & Country called "desert modern aesthetic...and, most importantly, happy." Mako designed home interiors and also Hollywood institutions such as the Jessica Nail Clinic, the home of Princess Shams and events such as the wedding of her daughter, Princess Scheherazade (décor of the reception).

== Personal life ==
Mako was born Laura Mae Church and married Gene Mako in November 1941. She was considered a protegee of Helen Hayes and was given away by Hayes' husband Charles MacArthur at her wedding. She was a godmother to Lorenzo Lamas.
