= Ernest Sutter =

American tennis player

- Full name: Ernest Malcolm Sutter
- Country (sports): United States
- Born: December 2, 1916
- Died: January 27, 1988 (aged 71)
- Plays: Right-handed

Grand Slam singles results
- US Open: 2R (1934, 1935, 1936, 1938, 1939, 1940)

Ernest Malcolm Sutter (December 2, 1916 – January 27, 1988) was an American tennis player.

The youngest of three tennis playing brothers, Sutter was a native of New Orleans and played varsity tennis for Tulane University, winning back to back NCAA singles championships in 1936 and 1937. This repeated the accomplishment of brother Cliff who also won the NCAA title twice earlier in the decade.

Sutter was injured in World War II, while taking part in the North Africa campaign. He was caught in a German heavy artillery barrage near the city of Bizerte and suffered several wounds, the most serious of which was to his playing arm, effectively ending his competitive tennis career.
