= Henry Culley =

American tennis player

- Full name: Henry M. Culley
- Country (sports): United States
- Turned pro: 1929 (amateur tour)
- Retired: 1937
- Plays: Right-handed (one-handed backhand)

Singles

Grand Slam singles results
- French Open: 1R (1934. 1935)
- Wimbledon: 1R (1934. 1935)
- US Open: QF (1936)

Doubles

Grand Slam doubles results
- Wimbledon: 1R (1934, 1935)

Mixed doubles

Grand Slam mixed doubles results
- Wimbledon: 1R (1934, 1935)

Henry M. Culley was an American tennis player active in the 1930s.

== Tennis career ==
Culley reached the quarterfinals of the U.S. National Championships in 1936, defeating No. 5 seed and 1931 Wimbledon champion Sidney Wood before losing to Fred Perry.
