= Bob Murray (tennis) =

Canadian tennis player (1914–1989)

- Full name: Robert Dudley Murray
- Country (sports): Canada
- Born: May 16, 1914
- Died: January 15, 1989 (aged 74)
- Plays: Right-handed

Singles

Grand Slam singles results
- French Open: 3R (1936)
- Wimbledon: 2R (1935)
- US Open: 3R (1933, 1935, 1936)

Robert Dudley Murray (May 16, 1914 – January 15, 1989) was a Canadian tennis player.

A native of Montreal, Quebec, Murray won three intercollegiate team championships with McGill University. In 1935 he became the first Canadian win an international title, beating Ian Collins in the final of the Scottish Championships. He was Canada's top ranked player in 1937 and was runner-up at the Canadian Championships that year to American Walter Senior in five sets. In 1938 he played a Davis Cup tie for Canada against Japan in Montreal.

In World War II, Murray fought with the Canadian forces in Normandy and later served as a special staff observer, attached to the U.S. Marine Corps in Hawaii. He didn't return to the tour after the war.

Murray was a 1994 inductee into the Canadian Tennis Hall of Fame.

== See also ==
- List of Canada Davis Cup team representatives
