= Bryan Grant =

American tennis player (1909–1986)

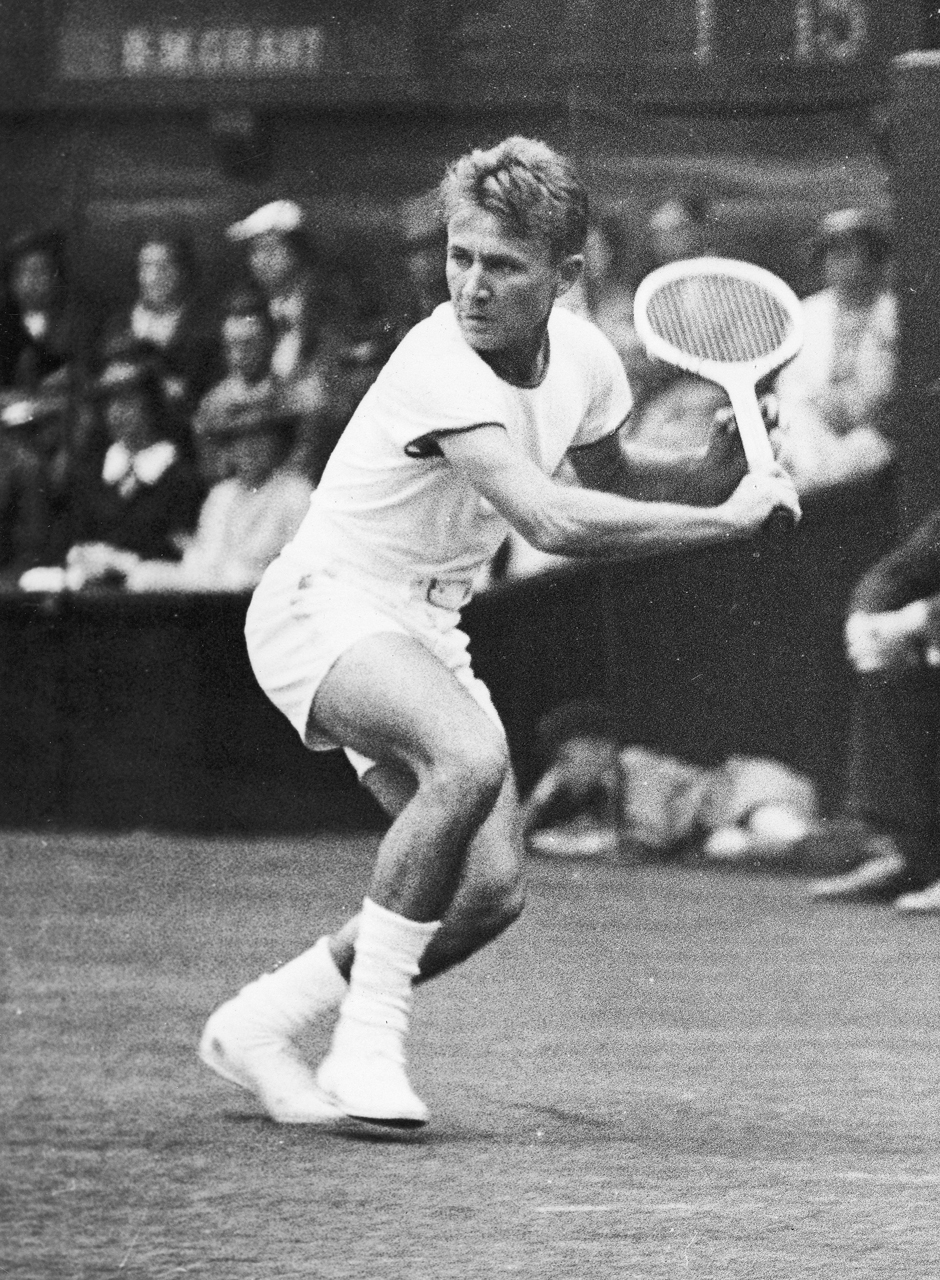
- Grant at the 1937 Wimbledon Championships
- Full name: Bryan Morel Grant Jr.
- Country (sports): United States
- Born: December 25, 1909 Atlanta, Georgia, US
- Died: June 5, 1986 (aged 76) Atlanta, Georgia, US
- Height: 5 ft 4 in (1.63 m)
- Plays: Right-handed
- Int. Tennis HoF: 1977 (member page)

Singles
- Highest ranking: No. 6 (1937, A. Wallis Myers)

Grand Slam singles results
- Wimbledon: QF (1936, 1937)
- US Open: SF (1935, 1936)

Grand Slam doubles results
- Wimbledon: 3R (1936)

Bryan Morel "Bitsy" Grant Jr. (December 25, 1909 – June 5, 1986) was an American amateur tennis champion. At 5 feet 4 inches (163 cm) and 120 pounds (54 kg), Grant was the smallest American man to win a championship on the international tennis circuit. A right-handed retriever, he was able to beat heavy-hitting greats such as Don Budge and Ellsworth Vines even when playing on grass. His nickname was "Itsy Bitsy the Giant Killer".

At a young age, Grant was already a star in football, basketball and tennis at local Atlanta schools. In 1929, he won the Georgia state (GIAA) tennis title. Grant had gained national stature in tennis long before his graduation from the University of North Carolina at Chapel Hill in 1933.

During World War II, he served in the Pacific Islands as a US Army rifleman in and around Papua New Guinea. His letters to his future wife attest that he fought out of a foxhole for several months, and saw heavy and repeated firefights.

Grant died at the age of 76 at his home in Townsend Place.

== Tennis career ==
Between 1930 and 1941, Grant was ranked nine times in the U.S. Top Ten (USLTA). He was third in 1935 and second in 1936 (USLTA). A. Wallis Myers of The Daily Telegraph ranked Grant World No. 6 in 1937 and World No. 8 in 1936. Grant won 8 of 11 tournaments entered in 1935, and did not lose one match on clay courts. He won the U.S. Clay Court Championships thrice (1930, 1934, 1935). Grant reached the U.S. National Championships semifinals in 1935 by defeating second-seeded Don Budge, before losing to Sidney Wood and in 1936, he lost in the semifinals to eventual champion Fred Perry. He was a quarterfinalist in 1937, losing to Gottfried von Cramm, and reached the same round a year later.

Grant was a standout on the Davis Cup team in 1935, 1936 and 1937, helping the U.S. regain the prize in 1937 after a 10-year slump. At this time he also defeated in major tournaments Don Budge, Frank Shields, and Wilmer Allison. He reached the quarterfinals at Wimbledon in 1936 and 1937, losing to Fred Perry and Bunny Austin. Also in 1937, Grant and Wayne Sabin were the 3rd-ranked U.S. doubles team. He also won the singles and the doubles titles at the tournament in Cincinnati in both 1939 and 1933.

Frank Shields, who had had his issues both with interactions with other players, and with alcohol, was known for making fun of Grant, saying "the little shaver" was hiding behind the net. Once a drunk Shields held Grant upside down, outside a hotel window.

Grant continued to compete as a senior, winning 19 U.S. singles titles on the four surfaces: grass court-45s (1956 and 1957), 55s (1965, 1966, 1967 and 1968); indoor 55s (1966); clay court-45s (1959, 1960, 1961 and 1963), 55s (1965, 1966, 1967, 1968 and 1969), 65s (1976 and 1977); and hard court-65s (1976).

Atlanta's largest tennis center, the Bitsy Grant Tennis Center, was named for him in 1954. Grant was inducted into the International Tennis Hall of Fame in 1972.
