= Richard Hebard =

American tennis and platform tennis player

Richard K. Hebard was a notable tennis and platform tennis player. He won the men's platform tennis title nine times (1947-48, 1951-52, 1955-57, 1963, 1965), and the Mixed Doubles three times (1953-55). He was inducted into the Platform Tennis Hall of Fame in 1965.
