= Robert J. Kelleher =

American judge

Senior Judge of the United States District Court for the Central District of California
- In office March 5, 1983 – June 20, 2012

Judge of the United States District Court for the Central District of California
- In office December 21, 1970 – March 5, 1983
- Appointed by: Richard Nixon
- Preceded by: Seat established by 84 Stat. 294
- Succeeded by: Alicemarie Huber Stotler

Personal details
- Born: Robert Joseph Kelleher; May 5, 1913 New York City, New York
- Died: June 20, 2012 (aged 99) Los Angeles, California
- Education: Williams College (AB); Harvard University (JD)
- Tennis career
- Country (sports): United States
- Plays: Right-handed (one-handed backhand)
- Int. Tennis HoF: 2000 (member page)

Singles

Grand Slam singles results
- US Open: 2R (1934, 1935)

Robert Joseph Kelleher (March 5, 1913 – June 20, 2012) was a United States district judge of the United States District Court for the Central District of California and an American tennis player and official, inducted into the International Tennis Hall of Fame in 2000.

== Education and career ==
Born on May 5, 1913, in New York City, Kelleher received an Artium Baccalaureus degree in 1935 from Williams College and a Juris Doctor in 1938 from Harvard Law School. He was a trial attorney for the United States Trucking Company in New York City from 1939 to 1940. He was an associate attorney for the United States Department of the Army in Los Angeles, California from 1941 to 1942. He served in the United States Naval Reserve from 1943 to 1945. He was in private practice in Santa Monica, California, from 1945 to 1948. He was an Assistant United States Attorney for the Southern District of California from 1948 to 1951. He was in private practice in Beverly Hills from 1951 to 1971.

== Federal judicial service ==
Kelleher was nominated by President Richard Nixon on December 15, 1970, to the United States District Court for the Central District of California, to a new seat authorized by 84 Stat. 294. He was confirmed by the United States Senate on December 17, 1970, and received his commission on December 21, 1970. He assumed senior status on March 5, 1983. Kelleher became the oldest serving federal judge in America in 2012 after Wesley E. Brown died at the age of 104. He died on June 20, 2012 at the age of 99 in Los Angeles.

== Notable cases ==
In 1977, Kelleher served as the judge in the separate trials of Christopher Boyce and Andrew Daulton Lee, the subjects of the 1985 movie The Falcon and the Snowman and the book of the same name.

== Tennis career ==
Kelleher was the New England Intercollegiate Doubles Champion in 1933 and won the Eastern Collegiate Doubles the same year. He won the Canadian mixed doubles championship in 1947 with his wife Gracyn Wheeler Kelleher. Kelleher was the U.S. Davis Cup Captain in 1962–63 (winning in 1963) and was a three-time U.S. Hard Court 45s doubles champion.

As president of the United States Lawn Tennis Association (USLTA) in 1967–68, Kelleher helped make open tennis a reality in 1968. Prior to his presidency, major tennis tournaments were closed to professional players and prize money was not offered. Kelleher was instrumental in changing this system, thus allowing anyone to play and instituting legitimate prize money in tournaments. He also participated extensively in the activities of the Southern California Tennis Association.

Legal offices
Preceded by Seat established by 84 Stat. 294	Judge of the United States District Court for the Central District of California; 1970–1983	Succeeded by Alicemarie Huber Stotler
