= Arthur Hendrix =

American tennis player

- Full name: Arthur Hodges Hendrix
- Country (sports): United States
- Born: 7 October 1912 Birmingham, Alabama, United States
- Died: 22 April 1988 (aged 75) Lakeland, Florida, United States
- Turned pro: 1940 (amateur 1932)
- Retired: 1941

Singles
- Career titles: 10

Grand Slam singles results
- US Open: 2R (1936)

Other tournaments
- Professional majors
- US Pro: QF (1940)

Arthur Hodges Hendrix (7 October 1912 – 22 April 1988) was an American amateur tennis player in the 1930s. Hendrix, who was ranked No. 10 in the United States in 1936, He later turned professional in 1940 and was a quarter finalist at the U.S. Pro Tennis Championships.

== Career ==
Hendrix played his first tournament at the Pan American Championships in 1932 where he reached the quarter-finals losing to Wilmer Allison. In 1934 was the singles finalist at the Tri-State-Tournament today's Cincinnati Open. In 1935 he won his first title at the Sugar Bowl tournament in New Orleans against Wilmer Allison. In 1935 he won the Dixie International Championships at Davis Islands, Tampa, Florida against Carroll Turner, and the Florida West Coast tournament in St. Petersburg, Florida.

In 1936, he won the singles and doubles titles at the Tennessee Valley Invitational, and was a semifinalist in both singles and doubles in the Southern championships. In 1938 he won his final amateur title at the Jamaican International Championships against Donald Leahong.

At the end of 1939 he turned professional and joined the professional tour. In early 1940 he played at the South Eastern Professional. He played his final tournament at the 1940 U.S. Pro Tennis Championship in 1940 where he reached the quarter-final stage before losing to Fred Perry.
