= John McDiarmid (tennis) =

American tennis player

- Country (sports): United States
- Born: August 12, 1911; Beckley, West Virginia, U.S.
- Died: November 4, 1982 (aged 71)

Singles
- Highest ranking: No. 7 (1936 U.S. ranking)

Grand Slam singles results
- US Open: QF (1936)

Doubles

Grand Slam doubles results
- US Open: F (1936)

John McDiarmid (August 12, 1911 – November 4, 1982) was a tennis player in the 1930s and 1940s. He was born in Beckley, West Virginia.

== Tennis career ==
In singles, McDiarmid was ranked as high as No. 7 in the United States, achieving that ranking in 1936. That year he was a semifinalist at the U.S. Clay Court Championships and at Cincinnati, and a quarterfinalist at the U.S. National Championships where he lost to Don Budge. He also was a finalist at the Kentucky State Championships in 1936 and won the Chicago City Championships that year, as he was living there at the time.

In 1937, he reached the singles final in Cincinnati before falling to Bobby Riggs.

McDiarmid was also a doubles player. He paired with Eugene McCauliff to reach the doubles final at the U.S. Nationals in 1936, and to win back-to-back doubles titles in Cincinnati in 1936 and 1937. No other doubles team would win consecutive titles in Cincinnati until 69 years later when Jonas Björkman and Max Mirnyi successfully defended their 2005 Cincinnati doubles title by winning the title in 2006.

He also was a doubles finalist in Cincinnati in 1933.

McDiarmid attended Texas Christian University, and has been inducted into that school's Letterman's Association Hall of Fame, as well as the Texas Sports Hall of Fame.
