= Charles Harris (tennis) =

American tennis player

- Full name: Charles Russell Harris
- Country (sports): United States
- Born: April 2, 1914
- Died: September 10, 1993 (aged 79)

Singles

Grand Slam singles results
- French Open: 3R (1937)
- Wimbledon: 1R (1937)
- US Open: 4R (1937)

Doubles

Grand Slam doubles results
- French Open: W (1939)
- Wimbledon: 2R (1937)

Charles Russell "Charly" Harris (April 2, 1914 – September 10, 1993) was an American tennis player in the 1930s.

Harris reached the singles final at the Tri-State Tennis Tournament, now known as the Cincinnati Masters, in 1936 before losing to future Hall of Famer Bobby Riggs in straight sets.

Harris won the doubles title at the French Championships in 1939 with his partner was Don McNeill.

Harris had five children - Charles Harris, Robert Harris, William Harris, Betty Harris, Mary Harris. His son William Harris, was also a tennis player.

== Grand Slam finals ==
=== Doubles (1 title) ===
Result	Year	Championship	Surface	Partner	Opponents	Score
Win	1939	French Championships	Clay	(United States) Don McNeill	(France) Jean Borotra (France) Jacques Brugnon	4–6, 6–4, 6–0, 2–6. 10–8
