= Hal Surface =

American tennis player

- Full name: John Halstead Surface Jr.
- Country (sports): United States
- Born: August 12, 1913
- Died: September 2, 2001 (aged 88)
- Plays: Right-handed

Singles
- Career record: 188-100
- Career titles: 17

Grand Slam singles results
- French Open: 4R (1937)
- Wimbledon: 2R (1937)
- US Open: 4R (1937, 1940)

John Halstead Surface Jr. (August 12, 1913 – September 2, 2001) was an American tennis player.

A native of Kansas City, Missouri, Surface picked up the sport of tennis aged 15. He was self taught and trained at the Rockhill Tennis Club in Kansas City. In his senior year at Central High School he won the state interscholastic singles championship. He played collegiate tennis for the University of Texas.

Surface had a top national ranking of No. 7 in 1937 and was a member of the United States Davis Cup squad that year, without featuring in a tie.

He twice reached the singles fourth round at the U.S national championships, including in 1940 when he had a win over Gardnar Mulloy en route. Internationally, Surface's title wins included the All-India Championships and he had a fourth round appearance at Roland Garros.

Surface won the Jamaican International Championships on clay in Kingston, Jamaica in 1939 defeating Charles Hare, the 1937 world No. 10, in the final. That same year, Surface won the Maryland State Championships defeating in turn Bill Talbert, Jack Kramer, Wayne Sabin, and Eddie Alloo in the last four rounds.
