= Ramsay D. Potts =

United States Army Air Forces bomber pilot and lawyer

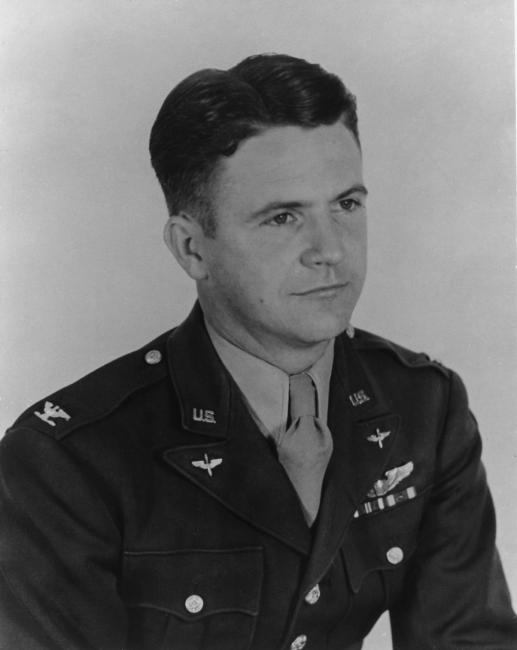
- Born: October 24, 1916; Memphis, Tennessee, U.S.
- Died: May 28, 2006 (aged 89); Boynton Beach, Florida, U.S.
- Burial place: Arlington National Cemetery
- Military career
- Branch: United States Army Air Forces; United States Air Force Reserves
- Service years: 1941–1972
- Rank: Major General
- Units: 93rd Bomb Group; 453rd Bomb Group; 389th Bomb Group
- Commands: 453rd Bomb Group; 389th Bomb Group
- Conflicts: World War II
- Awards: Distinguished Service Cross; Silver Star (2); Legion of Merit; Distinguished Flying Cross (3); Bronze Star; Air Medal (5)

Ramsay Douglas Potts (October 24, 1916 – May 28, 2006) was an American military officer and lawyer. He served as a United States Army Air Forces bomber pilot during World War II, receiving multiple military decorations. After the war, Potts had a civilian career in law, public service and corporate leadership.

== Early life ==
Potts was born on October 24, 1916, in Memphis, Tennessee. His father worked as a cotton merchant. In 1941, he graduated with a bachelor in science in commerce from the University of North Carolina at Chapel Hill, where he competed in tennis in the Southern Conference and played as a guard on the basketball team. After graduation, he continued to work in cotton business with his father and later as a professor at the Memphis Junior College.

== Military career ==
After registering for military draft in 1941, Potts enlisted in the United States Army Air Corps, and underwent flight training at Randolph and Brooks Fields. He earned his pilot wings and commission as a second lieutenant five days after the Japanese attack on Pearl Harbor on December 7, 1941.

=== World War II ===
In 1942, Potts arrived in England where he was assigned to the 330th Bomb Squadron of the 93rd Bomb Group, flying B-24 Liberators, and by August 1942 had advanced to the role of squadron Operations Officer. The squadron took part in bombing missions against targets in Northern France, but in November it was briefly engaged in convoy protection in the build-up to Operation Torch. On November 21, while patrolling over the Bay of Biscay, Potts's B-24 came under attack by five German fighters. In the encounter that followed, his crew managed to shoot down two of the fighters and damage another. Potts then broke away from the fight and safely brought the bomber down at an airfield in England. The 93rd became known as the “Traveling Circus” because it was temporarily detached from the Eighth Air Force several times.

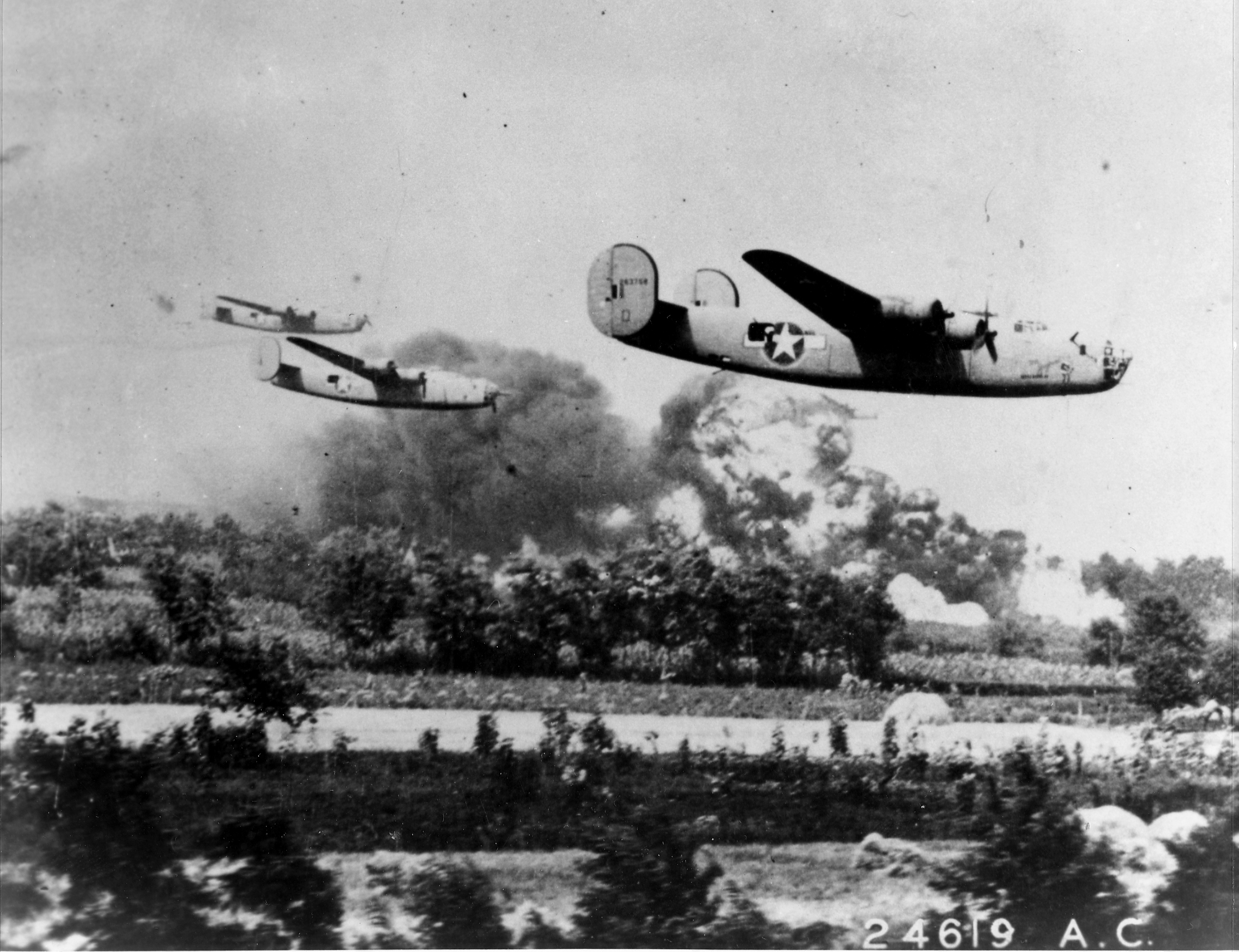
B-24s over Ploesti in the attack on the Ploesti oil fields

In 1943, the group transferred to Benghazi, Libya, to take part in the first major attack on the oil refineries in Ploesti, Romania. On August 1, 1943, the B-24s departed for the raid with Potts as squadron commander leading Force B of the B-24s. As the B-24s crossed the Albanian mountains, severe weather scattered the formation, leaving Potts and his squadron unexpectedly at the front. Near the target, the mission leader made a wrong turn, sending the force straight into the area with the heaviest defenses. Potts broke radio silence to warn him, but the mistake had already thrown the operation off balance. Because of the error, both separated formations reached the target at the same time but from different directions. Potts led his twelve aircraft through what was later described as relentless fire from nearly every type of ground weapon. His own bomber was badly hit and some crew members were injured. As they withdrew, enemy fighters pursued them all the way to the Ionian Sea, leaving the scattered bombers without the protection of tight formation flying. Despite major damage to his controls, Potts kept his aircraft airborne and was among the few who made it back to Benghazi after nearly fourteen hours in the air. When he landed, his B-24, the Duchess, was riddled with more than fifty large holes. The raid resulted in the loss of 532 men and 54 aircraft, and only 30 of the 178 bombers which landed were considered flyable. For his actions in the raid, Potts received the Distinguished Service Cross and was promoted to Group Operations Officer of the 93rd BG.

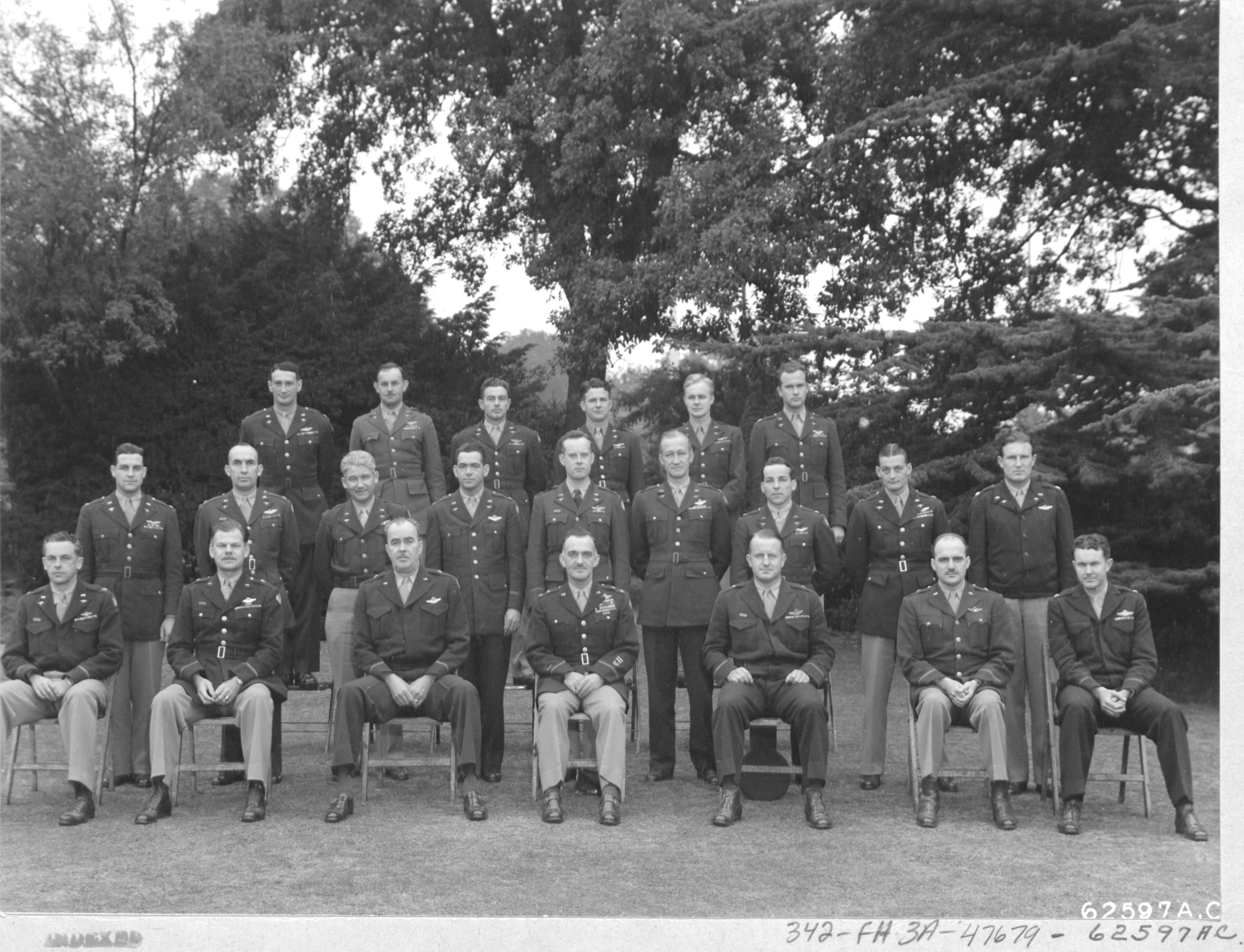
Wing and Group Commanders meeting of the 2nd Bomb Division, 8th Air Force. Potts is on the top row, fourth from the left (1944)

After the raid, Potts continued to fly daylight bombing missions over Germany. In March 1944, he was promoted to colonel and took command of the 453rd Bomb Group. During this time, actor James Stewart served in this unit as its executive officer. Five months later, Potts took over as commander of the 389th Bomb Group, and by November 1944 he had transitioned to a position on the Eighth Air Force staff. In January 1945, he became Director for Bomber Operations and as chief of staff of the 2nd Air Division, and led the division on seven separate missions. During the war, Potts flew a total of 41 missions.

=== Post-war ===
Following the surrender of Germany in May 1945, Potts became an Executive Officer of the Military Analysis Division for the United States Strategic Bombing Survey. While in this role, he interviewed top Nazi military leaders, including Hermann Goering, Albert Kesselring and Alfred Jodl, and wrote reports for presentation to American political and military leaders. Potts left active duty at the rank of colonel in February 1946 and remained in the United States Air Force Reserves. He retired from the reserves at the rank of major general in 1972.

== Later life ==
Potts married Veronica Raynor in 1945. The couple had four children, and several grand and great-grandchildren.

After the end of World War II, Potts graduated from Harvard Law School in 1948. He served as a faculty member at the Air War College and also served as Chairman of the Air Force's Air Reserve Policy Committee. He then moved to Memphis to begin his legal career. In 1958, he helped establish a law firm in Washington that later became Shaw, Pittman, Potts & Trowbridge. The firm handled corporate, securities, environmental and nuclear energy cases. Potts worked with the Investment Company Institute during the early days of the mutual fund industry and became an expert in air transportation law. He gained this experience after serving as a special assistant to United States Secretary of the Air Force W. Stuart Symington and as president of the Military Air Transport Association. Potts also helped raise funds for the Mighty Eighth Air Force Museum in Savannah, Georgia. Potts stepped down as managing partner of his firm in 1986 and continued as senior counsel. By then, the firm had grown to more than 300 lawyers with offices in several major cities. Beyond his legal career, he has authored numerous articles for Air Force Magazine and held the position of publisher for Air Power History. He also served in various national security and government roles, helped lead the Air Force Historical Foundation and was on the board of Emerson Electric. In May 2005, Potts was honored at a gala dinner in Washington hosted by Prince Edward, Duke of Kent. The event was organised by the American Air Museum in Britain to mark the 60th anniversary of the end of World War II and to recognize the strong friendship between the people of Britain and the USAAF.

He died of stroke on May 28, 2006, at the age of 89. He was cremated and his ashes interred, next to his wife who predeceased him in 1993, at Arlington National Cemetery.

== Awards and decorations ==
His decorations include:

USAF Command pilot badge
| Distinguished Service Cross |
| Silver Star with bronze oak leaf cluster |
| Legion of Merit |
| Distinguished Flying Cross with two bronze oak leaf clusters |
| Bronze Star Medal |
| Air Medal with four bronze oak leaf clusters |
| Air Force Presidential Unit Citation with bronze oak leaf cluster |
| American Defense Service Medal |
| American Campaign Medal |
| European-African-Middle Eastern Campaign Medal (unknown number of campaign stars) |
| World War II Victory Medal |
| National Defense Service Medal with service star |
| Air Force Longevity Service Award with silver and bronze oak leaf clusters |
| Armed Forces Reserve Medal with silver hourglass device |
| Distinguished Flying Cross (United Kingdom) |
| Croix de Guerre with Palm (France) |

=== Distinguished Service Cross citation ===

Potts, Ramsay Douglas
Major (Air Corps), U.S. Army Air Forces
330th Bombardment Squadron, 93d Bombardment Group (H), Ninth Air Force (Attached)
Date of Action: August 1, 1943

Citation:

"The President of the United States of America, authorized by Act of Congress July 9, 1918, takes pleasure in presenting the Distinguished Service Cross to Major (Air Corps) Ramsey Douglas Potts, Jr. (ASN: 0-431039), United States Army Air Forces, for extraordinary heroism in connection with military operations against an armed enemy while serving as Commander of a Squadron of B-24 Heavy Bombers of the 330th Bombardment Squadron, 93d Bombardment Group (H), NINTH Air Force (Attached), while participating in a bombing mission on 1 August 1943, against the Ploesti Oil Refineries in Rumania. During a long and hazardous attack against a vital enemy oil installation made at low-altitude by a formation of B-24 type aircraft, Major Potts commanded his squadron gallantly as they flew through heavy enemy fire against impossible odds. In confusion while approaching the target, and with the primary target out of range, Major Potts directed his bombers to attack targets of opportunity, inflicting heavy damage on the German oil installations. The heroic leadership, personal courage and zealous devotion to duty displayed by Major Potts on this occasion, even when confronted with practically certain destruction, exemplified the highest traditions of the military service and reflects great credit upon himself, the 9th Air Force, and the United States Army Air Forces".
