= Sandy Davenport =

American tennis player

- Full name: Sebert Ellsworth Davenport III
- Country (sports): United States

Grand Slam singles results
- US Open: 3R (1933, 1936, 1940)

Sebert Ellsworth "Sandy" Davenport III (1912–1960) was an American tennis player.

Davenport, a varsity tennis captain at Harvard University, was the fourth generation of his family to become a dentist.

Active on tour in the 1930s and 1940s, Davenport made the singles third round of the U.S. National Championships on three occasions. In 1934 he scored a significant upset over Gregory Mangin at the Brooklyn tennis championships. He won back to back New Hampshire State Championships and White Mountains Tennis Championships (a joint event) in 1938 and 1939.

During World War II, Davenport was stationed at an army hospital in Europe.

At the time of his death in 1960 he was on the executive of the New York Academy of Dentistry.

Davenport's father, Ellsworth Jr, was a long time tournament referee at Forest Hills.
