= Gene Mako =

American tennis player and art gallery owner (1916–2013)

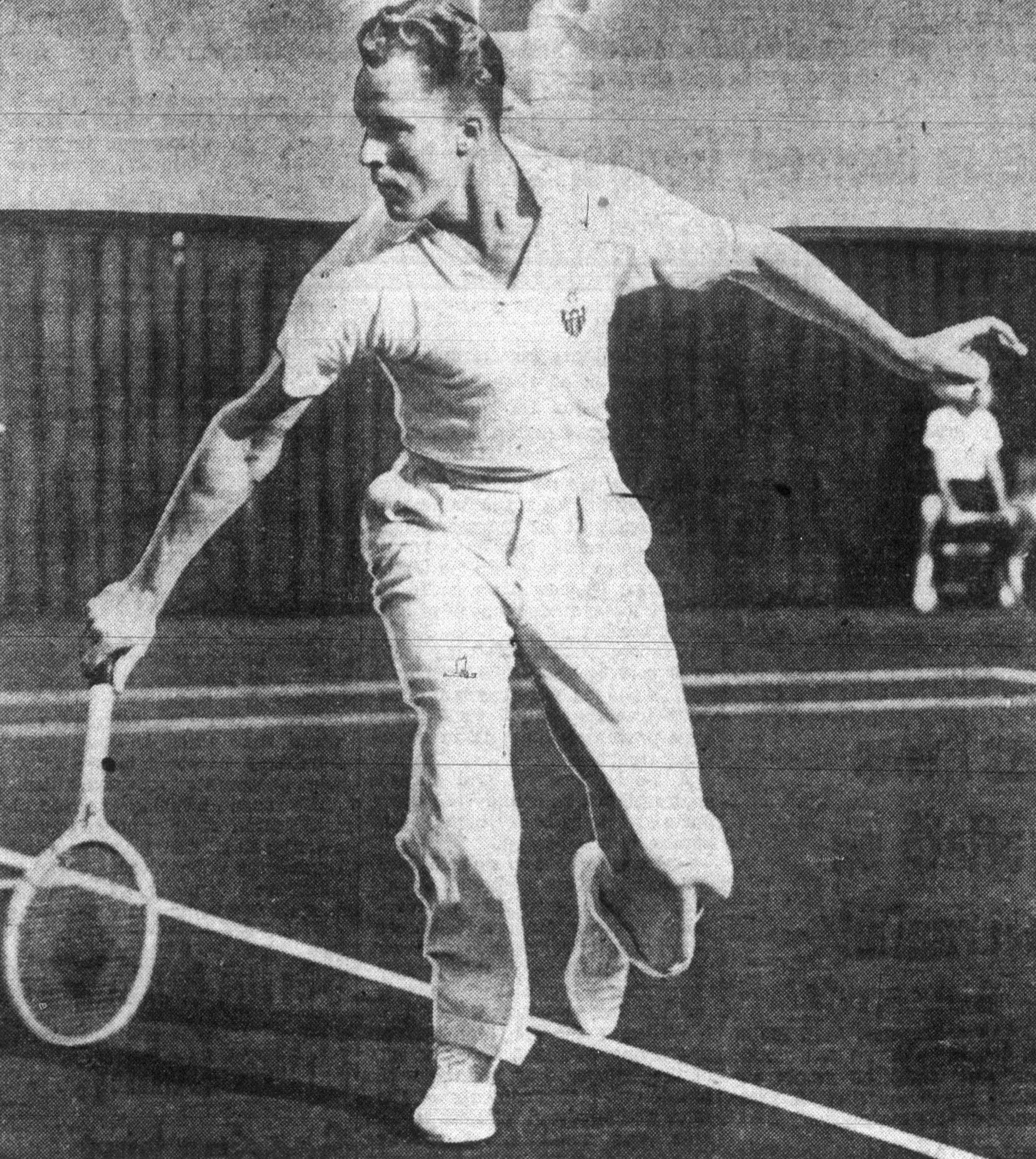
- Mako, circa 1941
- Full name: Constantine Eugene Mako
- Country (sports): United States
- Born: January 24, 1916 Budapest, Austria-Hungary
- Died: June 14, 2013 (aged 97) Los Angeles, California, U.S
- Height: 6 ft 0 in (1.83 m)
- Turned pro: 1943 (amateur tour from 1927)
- Retired: 1954
- Plays: Right-handed (one-handed backhand)
- Int. Tennis HoF: 1973 (member page)

Singles
- Highest ranking: No. 8 (1938, A. Wallis Myers)

Grand Slam singles results
- Australian Open: QF (1938)
- French Open: 3R (1938)
- Wimbledon: 4R (1935, 1937, 1938)
- US Open: F (1938)

Other tournaments
- Professional majors
- US Pro: QF (1943)

Grand Slam doubles results
- Wimbledon: W (1937, 1938)
- US Open: W (1936, 1938)

Grand Slam mixed doubles results
- US Open: W (1936)

Constantine "Gene" Mako (Hungarian: Makó Jenő [ˈmɒkoː ˈjɛnøː]; January 24, 1916 – June 14, 2013) was an American tennis player and art gallery owner. He was born in Budapest, Hungary. He won four Grand Slam doubles titles in the 1930s. Mako was inducted into the International Tennis Hall of Fame in Newport, Rhode Island, in 1973.

== Early life ==
His father Bartholomew Mako (Hungarian: Makó Bertalan) graduated from the Budapest Academy of Fine Arts in 1914. He started to work as a draftsman for his mentor Viktor Madarász. He was an avid soccer player himself. He fought in World War I. After the war, he left Hungary with his wife, Georgina Elizabeth Farkas Mako (Hungarian: Makó Farkas Erzsébet Georgina) and only son, traveling first to Italy, then stopping for three years in Buenos Aires, Argentina, then settled in Los Angeles, California. There he created works for public places like churches, libraries and post offices. Gene attended Glendale High School and the University of Southern California, and he was offered a Hungarian University Scholarship in the meantime. He quit before graduation.

== Tennis career ==
In 1934 he won the NCAA championships in singles and the doubles (with Phillip Caslin) while playing for the University of Southern California where he lettered at USC for three years (1934-36-37). He also won the boys' singles event at the U.S. National Championships in 1932 and 1934 and the boys' doubles in 1932, 1933 and 1934.

Mako was especially successful as a doubles player with his partner and friend Don Budge. They competed in seven Grand Slam finals, four of which they won. In 1936 Gene Mako and Alice Marble won the finals at the US Mixed Doubles Championships against Sarah Palfrey and Don Budge (6:3 and 6:2). They won the Newport Casino Invitational Tournament three consecutive times from 1936 to 1938.

From 1935 to 1938. Mako was a member of the United States Davis Cup team and played in eight ties. The US team won the Davis Cup in 1937, defeating the United Kingdom in the final at Wimbledon, and in 1938 in the final against Australia at the Germantown Cricket Club in Philadelphia. As a Davis Cup player he compiled a record of six wins and three losses.

Mako was in the U.S. top 10 in 1937 and 1938 (reaching as high as No. 3), and was ranked World No. 8 by A. Wallis Myers of The Daily Telegraph in 1938. That year, he reached the U.S. final at Forest Hills against his doubles partner Don Budge, who was in pursuit of the first Grand Slam.

In 1939. he was suspended and banned from playing for breaching the amateur rules. He and Don Budge allegedly accepted a sum of 20A£ for an exhibition match in Australia, which was against amateurism. Afterwards he continued to play tennis at that time during the Second World War while serving in the Navy. He also played professional basketball while stationed in Norfolk, Virginia.

In 1973 Mako was inducted into the International Tennis Hall of Fame. In 1999, he was elected to the University of Southern California Athletic Hall of Fame.

=== Playing style ===
He possessed strong serve and powerful smashes but due to several injuries in his career, he had to give up his power game. He preferred a volleying style, which he perfected with quickness, good angle selection and pacing paired with strategy.

== Personal life ==
Apart from being a sportsman, Mako composed music in his early 20s. He's the author of two songs, namely "Lovely as Spring" and "What Did You Dream Last Night?". He also starred in the 1938 musical Happy Landing and the 1941 war comedy Caught in the Draft, although he remained uncredited in both movies. Mako married actress Laura Mae Church in Manhattan in 1941. A month later, World War II broke out, and he joined the United States Navy. After this, he worked in a broadcasting studio. After his retirement, he designed tennis courts. His wife worked as an interior designer. He was involved in wrestling and was hired as a coach at the California Institute of Technology while also coaching the basketball team. He owned Gene Mako Galleries in Los Angeles, California. He also published a book about his father titled Bartholomew Mako: A Hungarian Master, 1890-1970. In the final decade of his life, he taught art. He died in 2013 at Cedars-Sinai Medical Center in Los Angeles, aged 97, of pneumonia.

== Grand Slam finals ==
=== Singles (1 runner-up) ===
Result	Year	Championship	Surface	Opponent	Score
Loss	1938	U.S. National Championships	Grass	(United States) Don Budge	3–6, 8–6, 2–6, 1–6

=== Doubles (4 titles, 3 runners-up) ===
Result	Year	Championship	Surface	Partner	Opponents	Score
Loss	1935	U.S. National Championships	Grass	(United States) Don Budge	(United States) Wilmer Allison (United States) John Van Ryn	2–6, 3–6, 6–2, 6–3, 1–6
Win	1936	U.S. National Championships	Grass	(United States) Don Budge	(United States) Wilmer Allison (United States) John Van Ryn	6–4, 6–2, 6–4
Win	1937	Wimbledon	Grass	(United States) Don Budge	(United Kingdom) Pat Hughes (United Kingdom) Raymond Tuckey	6–0, 6–4, 6–8, 6–1
Loss	1937	U.S. National Championships	Grass	(United States) Don Budge	(Germany) Henner Henkel (Germany) Gottfried von Cramm	4–6, 5–7, 4–6
Loss	1938	French Championships	Clay	(United States) Don Budge	(France) Bernard Destremau (France) Yvon Petra	6–3 3–6 7–9 1–6
Win	1938	Wimbledon	Grass	(United States) Don Budge	(Germany) Henner Henkel (Germany) Georg von Metaxa	6–4, 6–3, 3–6, 8–6
Win	1938	U.S. National Championships	Grass	(United States) Don Budge	(Australia) John Bromwich (Australia) Adrian Quist	6–3, 6–2, 6–1
