= Sidney Wood =

American tennis player

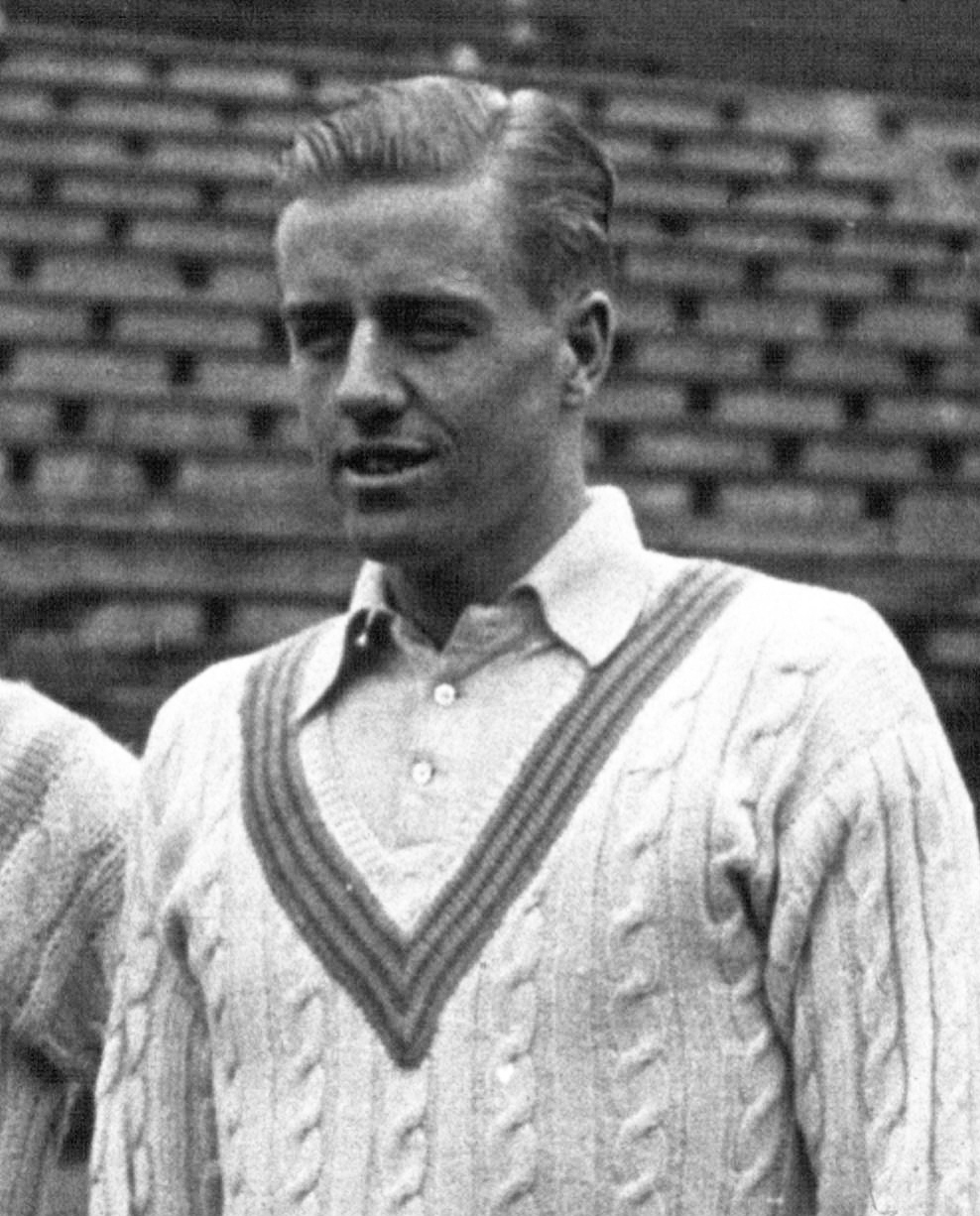
- Full name: Sidney Burr Beardslee Wood Jr.
- Country (sports): United States
- Born: November 1, 1911; Black Rock, Connecticut, U.S.
- Died: January 10, 2009 (aged 97); Palm Beach, Florida, U.S.
- Turned pro: 1927 (amateur tour)
- Retired: 1956
- Plays: Right-handed (1-handed backhand)
- Int. Tennis HoF: 1964 (member page)

Singles
- Highest ranking: No. 5 (1938, A. Wallis Myers)

Grand Slam singles results
- French Open: 3R (1928, 1932)
- Wimbledon: W (1931)
- US Open: F (1935)

Doubles

Grand Slam doubles results
- Wimbledon: SF (1931)
- US Open: F (1942)

Mixed doubles

Grand Slam mixed doubles results
- French Open: F (1932)

Team competitions
- Davis Cup: F (1934)

Sidney Burr Wood Jr. (November 1, 1911 – January 10, 2009) was an American tennis player who won the 1931 Wimbledon singles title. Wood was ranked in the world's Top 10 five times between 1931 and 1938, and was ranked World No. 6 in 1931 and 1934 and No. 5 in 1938 by A. Wallis Myers of The Daily Telegraph.

== Career ==
Wood was born in Black Rock, Connecticut. He won the Arizona State Men's Tournament on his 14th birthday, which qualified him for the French Championship and earned him a spot at Wimbledon. He attended The Hill School in Pottstown, Pennsylvania, where he created the tradition of "J-ball." At the French Championships in 1927, 15 year old Wood was the youngest competitor ever in the men's singles event. In the 1927 Wimbledon Championships, Wood became the youngest competitor in the Men's Singles at 15 years 231 days old and the Men's Doubles at 15 years 234 days old. He was the third youngest winner of the Wimbledon Championships, which he won in 1931 at the age of 19 (beating Fred Perry in the semi-finals and then Frank Shields withdrew from the final due to an ankle injury). Shields did so on request of the U.S. Davis Cup Committee, "Frank wanted to play me and it was an insult to Wimbledon and the public that he didn't," recalled Wood. Wood is the only uncontested winner of a Wimbledon final. He also reached the finals of the Mixed Doubles of the French Championships in 1932, the Davis Cup in 1934, and the U.S. National Championships Men's Singles in 1935 (losing to Wilmer Allison).

Wood is credited with inventing, designing and patenting Supreme Court, a synthetic playing surface used for indoor courts. It was used by the World Championship Tennis tour from 1973 to 1978. He was inducted into the Tennis Hall of Fame in 1964. In 2000, he led the Parade of Champions at Wimbledon as the oldest surviving title holder. At the time of his death, he was the oldest living Hall of Famer.

== Grand Slam finals ==
=== Singles: 2 (1 title, 1 runner-up) ===
Result	Year	Championship	Surface	Opponent	Score
Win	1931	Wimbledon	Grass	(United States) Frank Shields	walkover
Loss	1935	U.S. National Championships	Grass	(United States) Wilmer Allison	2–6, 2–6, 3–6

=== Doubles: 1 runner-up ===
Result	Year	Championship	Surface	Partner	Opponents	Score
Loss	1942	U.S. Championships	Grass	(United States) Ted Schroeder	(United States) Gardnar Mulloy (United States) Bill Talbert	7–9, 5–7, 1–6

=== Mixed Doubles: 1 runner-up ===
Result	Year	Championship	Surface	Partner	Opponents	Score
Loss	1932	French Championships	Clay	(United States) Helen Wills Moody	(United Kingdom) Betty Nuthall (United Kingdom) Fred Perry	4–6, 2–6

== Family ==
Wood's uncle Watson Washburn was a Davis Cup team member. He credited his uncle with introducing him to tennis.

Wood was the father of David, Colin, Sidney III, and W. Godfrey Wood. Sidney Wood III, a Yale tennis player, died at the age of 22 in an early morning car accident, in a car driven by a tennis teammate on a North Carolina highway in 1961. Colin is the young boy portrayed by Diane Arbus in the iconic 1962 photograph Child with Toy Hand Grenade in Central Park. Godfrey became a sports executive.

Wood was survived by three sons and his last wife, Patricia Wood (sister of the fashion editor Catherine Murray di Montezemolo).
