= 1946 in tennis =

This page covers all the important events in the sport of tennis in 1946. It provides the results of notable tournaments throughout the year on both the men's and women's ILTF tennis circuits.

== Australian Open ==
Category	Champion(s)	Finalist(s)	Score
Men's singles	(Australia) John Bromwich	(Australia) Dinny Pails	5–7, 6–3, 7–5, 3–6, 6–2
Women's singles	(Australia) Nancye Wynne Bolton	(Australia) Joyce Fitch	6–4, 6–4
Men's doubles	(Australia) John Bromwich (Australia) Adrian Quist	(Australia) Max Newcombe (Australia) Len Schwartz	6–3, 6–1, 9–7
Women's doubles	(Australia) Joyce Fitch (Australia) Mary Bevis	(Australia) Nancye Wynne Bolton (Australia) Thelma Coyne Long	9–7, 6–4
Mixed doubles	(Australia) Nancye Wynne Bolton (Australia) Colin Long	(Australia) Joyce Fitch (Australia) John Bromwich	6–0, 6–4

== French Open ==
Category	Champion(s)	Finalist(s)	Score
Men's singles	(France) Marcel Bernard	(Czechoslovakia) Jaroslav Drobný	3–6, 2–6, 6–1, 6–4, 6–3
Women's singles	(United States) Margaret Osborne	(United States) Pauline Betz	1–6, 8–6, 7–5
Men's doubles	(France) Marcel Bernard (France) Yvon Petra	(Argentina) Enrique Morea (Ecuador) Pancho Segura	7–5, 6–3, 0–6, 1–6, 10–8
Women's doubles	(United States) Louise Brough (United States) Margaret Osborne	(United States) Pauline Betz (United States) Doris Hart	6–4, 0–6, 6–1
Mixed doubles	(United States) Pauline Betz (United States) Budge Patty	(United States) Dorothy Bundy (United States) Tom Brown	7–5, 9–7

== Wimbledon ==
Category	Champion(s)	Finalist(s)	Score
Men's singles	(France) Yvon Petra	(Australia) Geoff Brown	6–2, 6–4, 7–9, 5–7, 6–4
Women's singles	(United States) Pauline Betz	(United States) Louise Brough	6–2, 6–4
Men's doubles	(United States) Tom Brown (United States) Jack Kramer	(Australia) Geoff Brown (Australia) Dinny Pails	6–4, 6–4, 6–2
Women's doubles	(United States) Louise Brough (United States) Margaret Osborne	(United States) Pauline Betz (United States) Doris Hart	6–3, 2–6, 6–3
Mixed doubles	(United States) Tom Brown (United States) Louise Brough	(Australia) Geoff Brown (United States) Dorothy Bundy	6–4, 6–4

== US Open ==
Category	Champion(s)	Finalist(s)	Score
Men's singles	(United States) Jack Kramer	(United States) Tom Brown Jr.	9–7, 6–3, 6–0
Women's singles	(United States) Pauline Betz	(United States) Doris Hart	11–9, 6–3
Men's doubles	(United States) Gardnar Mulloy (United States) Bill Talbert	(United States) Frank Guernsey (United States) Don McNeill	3–6, 6–4, 2–6, 6–3, 20–18
Women's doubles	(United States) Louise Brough (United States) Margaret Osborne	(United States) Patricia Todd (United States) Mary Arnold Prentiss	6–1, 6–3
Mixed doubles	(United States) Margaret Osborne (United States) Bill Talbert	(United States) Louise Brough (United States) Robert Kimbrell	6–3, 6–4
