= 1946 in sports =

1946 in sports describes the year's events in world sport. Although World War II had ended in 1945, a number of major sporting events were still precluded by planning difficulties, which the war had produced, the 1946 FIFA World Cup being perhaps the best known. However, the year is still notable as several sporting events resumed for the first time since the start of the war.

== American football ==
- NFL Championship: the Chicago Bears won 24–14 over the New York Giants at the Polo Grounds
- All-America Football Conference begins play. Cleveland Browns win the championship by beating New York Yankees 14–9.
- The San Francisco 49ers are established and the Cleveland Rams move to Los Angeles, becoming the first professional sports teams in California.
- Notre Dame Fighting Irish – college football national championship

== Association football ==
International

- FIFA World Cup – not held due to World War II

Colombia

- Millonarios F.C. was founded in Teusaquillo area, Bogotá on June 18.

Spain

- La Liga – won by Sevilla

England

- FA Cup – Derby County beat Charlton Athletic 4–1 after extra time.
- The Football League resumes playing for the 1946–47 season.

Germany

- No major football is held due to the Allied occupation of Germany.

Italy

- Serie A-B^{[a]} – won by Torino

Portugal

- Primeira Liga – won by C.F. Os Belenenses^{[b]}

France

- French Division 1 – won by Lille OSC

== Athletics ==
- The third European Athletics Championships held from August 22 to August 25 at the Bislett Stadion in Oslo. For the first time, it is a combined event for men and women; and for the first time a city in Scandinavia hosts the championships.

== Australian rules football ==
- Victorian Football League
  - Essendon wins the 50th VFL Premiership, defeating Melbourne 22.18 (150) to 13.9 (87) in the Grand Final.
  - Brownlow Medal awarded to Don Cordner (Melbourne)
- South Australian National Football League
  - 5 October: Norwood 13.14 (92) beat Port Adelaide 9.10 (64) for their twentieth premiership, and the first of ten for coach Jack Oatey.
- Western Australian National Football League
  - 5 October: East Fremantle complete the only perfect season in open-age WANFL football by beating West Perth 11.13 (79) to 10.13 (73) in the Grand Final.

== Baseball ==
- January 23 – Hall of Fame election – the writers' vote again fails to select an inductee, despite a newly revamped voting process. Voting again favors earlier candidates from the 1900s and 1910s, but none is able to gain 75% of the vote.
- Jackie Robinson plays for the Montreal Royals, the AAA affiliate of the Brooklyn Dodgers, becoming the first African-American to play in organised baseball in the 20th century. Vincent "Manny" McIntyre from Fredericton, New Brunswick, Canada becomes the first Black Canadian to sign a professional baseball contract (with the Sherbrooke Canadians).
- April 23 – the Hall of Fame Committee clears the deadlock at the top of the writers' ballot by selecting 11 new inductees, primarily from the popular candidates of the 1900s and 1910s: Jesse Burkett, Frank Chance, Jack Chesbro, Johnny Evers, Clark Griffith, Tommy McCarthy, Joe McGinnity, Eddie Plank, Joe Tinker, Rube Waddell and Ed Walsh. Selections of 19th century players are largely postponed. It is decided that the writers will henceforth select only players retired within the more recent past, rather than from the entire 20th century.
- June 15 – when some ballplayers jump to the Mexican League, MLB Commissioner Happy Chandler mentions a lifetime suspension for them, but his penalty is later reduced (1949).
- July 14 – player–manager Lou Boudreau of Cleveland Indians hits four doubles and one home run, but Ted Williams wallops three HRs and drives in eight runs, as the Boston Red Sox top the Indians 11–10. In the Sox second–game win, the famous "Boudreau Shift" is born. Boudreau shifts all his players, except the third baseman and left fielder, to the right side of the diamond in an effort to stop Williams, who grounds out and walks twice while ignoring the shift.
- World Series – St. Louis Cardinals defeat the Boston Red Sox 4 games to 3.
- Negro World Series – Newark Eagles defeat the Kansas City Monarchs, 4 games to 3.
- Venezuelan Professional Baseball League (Liga Venezolana de Béisbol Profesional) first official game held on January 12.

== Basketball ==
NBL Championship

- Rochester Royals over Sheboygan Redskins (3–0)

Events

- On June 6 the NBA is founded as the Basketball Association of America. Unlike the NBL, this second major professional league attempts to operate primarily in large arenas in major cities.
- Boston Celtics, a major National Basketball Association club was founded in Massachusetts, United States.
- Continental Basketball Association formed as the Eastern Pennsylvania Basketball League
- Fourth European basketball championship, Eurobasket 1946, is won by Czechoslovakia.

Slovenia (former part of Yugoslavia)

- KK Olimpija (Košarkarski Kulb Olimpija) was founded in Ljubljana, however this club was dissolution in 2019.

== Cricket ==
- 29 March: With the end of the war, Test cricket is played for the first time since August 1939, and Australia destroys New Zealand by an innings and 103 runs on a rain-affected pitch.

Australia

- Although first-class cricket was resumed after the lifting of bans on weekday sport in 1945–46, the Sheffield Shield was not awarded.
- Most runs – Sid Barnes 794 @ 88.22 (HS 200)
- Most wickets – George Tribe 40 @ 19.02 (BB 9–45)

England

- County Championship – won by Yorkshire
- Minor Counties Championship – won by Suffolk
- Most runs – Denis Compton 2,403 @ 61.61 (HS 235)
- Most wickets – Eric Hollies 184 @ 15.60 (BB 10–49)
- England defeat India one Test to nil with two draws

India

- Ranji Trophy – Holkar beat Baroda by 374 runs.

New Zealand

- Plunket Shield – won by Canterbury

== Cycling ==
Tour de France

- not contested due to World War II

Giro d'Italia

- won by Gino Bartali

== Figure skating ==
- The World Figure Skating Championships were not held due to World War II.

== Golf ==
Men's professional

- Masters Tournament – Herman Keiser
- U.S. Open – Lloyd Mangrum
- British Open – Sam Snead
- PGA Championship – Ben Hogan

Men's amateur

- British Amateur – Jimmy Bruen
- U.S. Amateur – Ted Bishop

Women's professional

- Women's Western Open – Louise Suggs
- U.S. Women's Open – Patty Berg
- Titleholders Championship – Louise Suggs

== Horse racing ==
Steeplechases

- Cheltenham Gold Cup – won by Prince Regent
- Grand National – won by Lovely Cottage

Hurdle races

- Champion Hurdle – won by Distel

Flat races

- Australia – Melbourne Cup won by Russia
- Canada – King's Plate won by Kingarvie
- France – Prix de l'Arc de Triomphe won by Caracalla
- Ireland – Irish Derby Stakes won by Bright News
- English Triple Crown Races:
  1. 2,000 Guineas Stakes – Happy Knight
  2. The Derby – Airborne
  3. St. Leger Stakes – Airborne
- United States Triple Crown Races:
  1. Kentucky Derby – Assault
  2. Preakness Stakes – Assault
  3. Belmont Stakes – Assault

== Ice hockey ==
- Stanley Cup – Montreal Canadiens beat Boston Bruins four games to one.
- A first game for Soviet Championship League, as predecessor of Kontinental Hockey League was held on December 22.

== Rowing ==
The Boat Race

- 30 March — Oxford wins the 92nd Oxford and Cambridge Boat Race

== Rugby league ==
- 1946 Great Britain Lions tour
- 1945–46 European Rugby League Championship / 1946–47 European Rugby League Championship
- 1946 New Zealand rugby league season
- 1946 NSWRFL season
- 1945–46 Northern Rugby Football League season / 1946–47 Northern Rugby Football League season

== Rugby union ==
- Five Nations Championship series is not contested due to World War II

== Snooker ==
- World Snooker Championship – Joe Davis beats Horace Lindrum 78–67, then announces his retirement from the event after this, his fifteenth consecutive victory.

== Speed skating ==
Speed Skating World Championships

- not contested due to World War II

== Tennis ==
Australia

- Australian Men's Singles Championship – John Bromwich (Australia) defeats Dinny Pails (Australia) 5–7, 6–3, 7–5, 3–6, 6–2
- Australian Women's Singles Championship – Nancye Wynne Bolton (Australia) defeats Joyce Fitch (Australia) 6–4, 6–4

England

- Wimbledon Men's Singles Championship – Yvon Petra (France) defeats Geoff Brown (Australia) 6–2, 6–4, 7–9, 5–7, 6–4
- Wimbledon Women's Singles Championship – Pauline Betz Addie (USA) defeats Louise Brough Clapp (USA) 6–2, 6–4

France

- French Men's Singles Championship – Marcel Bernard (France) defeats Jaroslav Drobný (Czechoslovakia) 3–6, 2–6, 6–1, 6–4, 6–3
- French Women's Singles Championship – Margaret Osborne duPont (USA) defeats Pauline Betz Addie (USA) 1–6, 8–6, 7–5

USA

- American Men's Singles Championship – Jack Kramer (USA) defeats Tom Brown (USA) 9–7, 6–3, 6–0
- American Women's Singles Championship – Pauline Betz Addie (USA) defeats Doris Hart (USA) 11–9, 6–3

Davis Cup

- 1946 Davis Cup – United States 5–0 Australia at Kooyong Stadium (grass) Melbourne, Australia

== Awards ==
- Associated Press Male Athlete of the Year – Glenn Davis, College football
- Associated Press Female Athlete of the Year – Babe Didrikson Zaharias, LPGA golf

== Notes ==
^{a} Although Torino's scudetto is considered official, because Serie B teams from southern Italy played it is not usually included in statistics.
^{b} This is the first of only two instances where a team other than the "Big Three" has won the Primeira Liga.
