= Ferdinand Vrba =

Slovak tennis player

- Full name: Ferdinand Vrba
- Country (sports): Czechoslovakia
- Born: 27 June 1922; Bratislava, Czechoslovakia
- Died: 19 November 1991 (aged 69); Vienna, Austria
- Retired: 1959

Singles

Grand Slam singles results
- French Open: QF (1946)
- Wimbledon: 3R (1946)

Ferdinand Vrba (27 June 1922 – 19 November 1991) was a Slovak tennis player. He was active in the 1940s and 1950s.

== Career ==
Vrba began his career as war broke out. He reached the final of the Budapest championships in 1944, losing to József Asbóth. In 1946, Vrba reached the quarter finals of the French championships, losing to Yvon Petra. In December 1946, Vrba reached the final of the Flandres tournament, losing to Jacques Peten. In October 1949, Vrba was suspended by his national association for eight months for misconduct at the Slovak championships. He became a coach in Slovakia and then in the late 1960s, Vrba moved to Austria and died in Vienna in 1991.

In 2007, Vrba was included in memoriam to the Hall of Fame of the Slovak Tennis Association.
