= 1946 U.S. National Championships (tennis) =

- Date: August 31 – September 8
- Edition: 66th
- Category: Grand Slam (ILTF)
- Surface: Grass / outdoor
- Location: Forest Hills, Queens; New York City, New York
- Venue: West Side Tennis Club

Champions

Men's singles
- (United States) Jack Kramer

Women's singles
- (United States) Pauline Betz Addie

Men's doubles
- (United States) Gardnar Mulloy / (United States) Bill Talbert

Women's doubles
- (United States) Louise Brough / (United States) Margaret Osborne

Mixed doubles
- (United States) Margaret Osborne / (United States) Bill Talbert
← 1945 ·	U.S. National Championships	· 1947 →

The 1946 U.S. National Championships (now known as the US Open) was a tennis tournament that took place on the outdoor grass courts at the West Side Tennis Club, Forest Hills in New York City, New York. The tournament ran from August 31 until September 8. It was the 66th staging of the U.S. National Championships, and the fourth Grand Slam tennis event of the year.

== Finals ==
=== Men's singles ===
(United States) Jack Kramer defeated (United States) Tom Brown Jr. 9–7, 6–3, 6–0

=== Women's singles ===
(United States) Pauline Betz defeated (United States) Doris Hart 11–9, 6–3

=== Men's doubles ===
(United States) Gardnar Mulloy / (United States) Bill Talbert defeated (United States) Frank Guernsey / (United States) Don McNeill 3–6, 6–4, 2–6, 6–3, 20–18

=== Women's doubles ===
(United States) Louise Brough / (United States) Margaret Osborne defeated (United States) Patricia Todd / (United States) Mary Arnold Prentiss 6–1, 6–3

=== Mixed doubles ===
(United States) Margaret Osborne / (United States) Bill Talbert defeated (United States) Louise Brough / (United States) Robert Kimbrell 6–3, 6–4

Preceded by 1946 French Championships	Grand Slams	Succeeded by 1947 Australian Championships
