= Albert Ritzenberg =

American tennis player and coach

Albert Ritzenberg (November 11, 1918 – November 22, 2018) was an American tennis player, coach, and collector of tennis antiques.

== Early years ==
Ritzenberg was born of immigrant parents on Armistice Day, November 11, 1918. He and his older brothers were self-taught public parks tennis players growing up in Washington, D.C. He became the top ranked junior player in the Mid-Atlantic States and one of the premiere U.S. college players as the number one player at the University of Maryland.

== Professional playing career ==
Beginning in 1968, with the advent of the "Open" era of tennis, when professional players were allowed to compete again, Ritzenberg entered the competitive tennis arena as a 50-year-old man. Over the course of the next 45 years, he won senior national championships in the United States, earning 15 "Gold Balls", Canada, Germany, Switzerland, Israel, Spain, Czechoslovakia, Yugoslavia, the Soviet Union, Poland, Monte Carlo, and Brazil, and won major championships in England, Argentina, Mexico, France, Estonia, Australia, and Chile. He was also the Senior Asia champion, Senior European champion, ranked as high as number 1 in the Senior International Tennis Federation and a USPTA Senior Champion. Ritzenberg was a member of five US International team competitions for men 55 (Austria Cup), 65 (Britannia Cup), 70 (Crawford Cup) and 75 (Bitsy Grant Cup), all of which were winners of the ITF World Championships.

He served as the long-time tennis professional at the St. Albans School for Boys and Director of its Tennis Club.

Ritzenberg retired in 2005, as the number 1 world tennis player among men ages 85 and up.

== Democratization/expansion of the game ==
Ritzenberg is considered to be a major contributor to the popularization and democratization of tennis in the United States. Starting in the early 1950s Ritzenberg actively sought to integrate tennis by insisting that Washington area tournaments invite top ranked black athletes, by actively recruiting black members to the clubs with which he was associated, and by assisting black athletes with academic admission to an exclusive boys school in Washington, D.C. He organized tennis exhibitions, invited many of the world's top players to Washington and played in exhibitions with Althea Gibson, Richard "Pancho" Gonzalez, Billie Jean King, Neale Fraser, Roy Emerson, Vic Seixas, and Pauline Betz Addie, conducted clinics at mental hospitals and children's homes, and was instrumental in providing tennis opportunities for disabled people, including wheelchair-using athletes.

In 1956 Ritzenberg was sent by the US Department of State on the International Educational Exchange to establish a Goodwill Tennis program in Haiti. He was praised in Congress for his work on this Specialist Grant program.

Ritzenberg opened the first Washington area public indoor tennis facility. Later he opened the Cabin John Indoor Tennis Club with Pauline Betz and Stanley Hoffberger.

== Tennis and politics ==
During the Kennedy Administration, Ritzenberg taught tennis at St. Albans to a number of politicians. Ritzenberg was called to the White House to give tennis instruction to First Lady Jacqueline Kennedy and to hit with President John F. Kennedy.

== Tennis antiques and contributions to the game ==
At the International Tennis Hall of Fame and Museum, Ritzenberg is best known for his extensive tennis collection amassed over 50 years and acknowledged to be the largest, most comprehensive such private collection in the world. "Ranging from the Renaissance through the 1930s, the Albert and Madeleine Ritzenberg Collection covers virtually the entire history of tennis. In half a century of travels around the world, the Ritzenbergs have acquired objects related to tennis, building a collection that includes items from the 15th century up to the Art Deco period of the 1930s." That collection is now safely housed in the Museum in Newport, Rhode Island.

In the mid-1950s, he worked with Jimmy Van Alen to test the VASSS scoring system with the Kramer Tour in Washington, DC. The "Tiebreaker" has become a mainstay of the modern game. His passion for art inspired him to hire respected artists like Sam Gilliam and Jacob Kainan to create graphics for tennis. Ritzenberg has written articles for the New York Times, Washington Post, and Tennis Magazine on topics like tennis ethics and team play. He produced and appeared in instructional tennis films that were used in the USTA library.

== Capital Tennis ==
In 2004 Ritzenberg published a memoir of his life at the intersection of tennis and politics, Capital Tennis. In his autobiography, Ritzenberg writes not only about the opportunities this sport has afforded him but also about the lessons and values that the game of tennis instills in all who play.

"Ritzenberg's club was at the crest of a sweeping change, sparked during the Kennedy administration, in which Washington's power elite favored tennis rather than golf, the favored sport of the Eisenhower administration. Ritzenberg personally coached such memorable figures as Jacqueline Kennedy, Robert McNamara, George McGovern and Donna Shalala. He mentions his personal efforts to found the club as a place of equality as surely as the spirit of sports - though St. Albans was a private club, it would not discriminate on the basis of race or religion, an almost unprecedented decision in 1962, two years before Congress passed the Civil Rights Act of 1964."

== Death ==
Ritzenberg lived to be 100 years old on Veterans Day 2018. He died at his home in Bethesda, Maryland 11 days later.

== Awards and recognition ==
- Washington Area Tennis Patrons Foundation John Walker Award "Distinguished Service"
- 1983 Washington Area Tennis Patrons Foundation "Hall of Fame"
- 1995 Washington DC Jewish Sports Hall of Fame
- 1996 Middle Atlantic Tennis Hall of Fame Induction
- 2004 IONA Distinguished Service Award
- 2004 WTEF Washington Tennis & Education Foundation "Distinguished Service Award"
- Court named in honor at Rock Creek Park Tennis Center
- 2014 WTEF Washington Tennis & Education Foundation "Hall of Fame"
