= 1946 Wimbledon Championships =

- Date: 24 June – 6 July
- Edition: 60th
- Category: Grand Slam
- Surface: Grass
- Location: Church Road; SW19, Wimbledon, London, United Kingdom
- Venue: All England Lawn Tennis and Croquet Club

Champions

Men's singles
- (France) Yvon Petra

Women's singles
- (United States) Pauline Betz

Men's doubles
- (United States) Tom Brown / (United States) Jack Kramer

Women's doubles
- (United States) Louise Brough / (United States) Margaret Osborne

Mixed doubles
- (United States) Tom Brown / (United States) Louise Brough
← 1939 ·	Wimbledon Championships	· 1947 →

The 1946 Wimbledon Championships took place on the outdoor grass courts at the All England Lawn Tennis and Croquet Club in Wimbledon, London, United Kingdom. The tournament was held from Monday 24 June until Saturday 6 July 1946. It was the 60th staging of the Wimbledon Championships and the first one held after a six-year break due to World War II. In 1946 and 1947 Wimbledon was held before the French Championships and was thus the second Grand Slam tennis event of the year. The Wimbledon Championships would take place every year until 2019, a span of 74 consecutive years before the event would be cancelled in 2020 due to the COVID-19 pandemic.

== Finals ==
=== Men's singles ===
(France) Yvon Petra defeated (Australia) Geoff Brown, 6–2, 6–4, 7–9, 5–7, 6–4

=== Women's singles ===
(United States) Pauline Betz defeated (United States) Louise Brough, 6–2, 6–4

=== Men's doubles ===
(United States) Tom Brown / (United States) Jack Kramer defeated (Australia) Geoff Brown / (Australia) Dinny Pails, 6–4, 6–4, 6–2

=== Women's doubles ===
(United States) Louise Brough / (United States) Margaret Osborne defeated (United States) Pauline Betz / (United States) Doris Hart, 6–3, 2–6, 6–3

=== Mixed doubles ===
(United States) Tom Brown / (United States) Louise Brough defeated (Australia) Geoff Brown / (United States) Dorothy Bundy, 6–4, 6–4

Preceded by 1946 Australian Championships	Grand Slams	Succeeded by 1946 French Championships
Preceded by 1939 Wimbledon Championships; 1940 to 1945 editions cancelled	The Championships, Wimbledon	Succeeded by 1947 Wimbledon Championships
