= 1947 U.S. National Championships (tennis) =

- Date: September 6 – 14
- Edition: 67th
- Category: Grand Slam (ILTF)
- Surface: Grass
- Location: Forest Hills, Queens; New York City, New York
- Venue: West Side Tennis Club

Champions

Men's singles
- (United States) Jack Kramer

Women's singles
- (United States) Louise Brough

Men's doubles
- (United States) Jack Kramer / (United States) Ted Schroeder

Women's doubles
- (United States) Louise Brough / (United States) Margaret Osborne

Mixed doubles
- (United States) Louise Brough / (Australia) John Bromwich
← 1946 ·	U.S. National Championships	· 1948 →

The 1947 U.S. National Championships (now known as the US Open) was a tennis tournament that took place on the outdoor grass courts at the West Side Tennis Club, Forest Hills in New York City, New York. The tournament ran from September 6 until September 14. It was the 67th staging of the U.S. National Championships, and the fourth Grand Slam tennis event of the year.

== Finals ==
=== Men's singles ===
(United States) Jack Kramer defeated (United States) Frank Parker 4–6, 2–6, 6–1, 6–0, 6–3

=== Women's singles ===
(United States) Louise Brough defeated (United States) Margaret Osborne 8–6, 4–6, 6–1

=== Men's doubles ===
(United States) Jack Kramer / (United States) Ted Schroeder defeated (United States) Bill Talbert / (Australia) Bill Sidwell 6–4, 7–5, 6–3

=== Women's doubles ===
(United States) Louise Brough / (United States) Margaret Osborne defeated (United States) Patricia Todd / (United States) Doris Hart 5–7, 6–3, 7–5

=== Mixed doubles ===
(United States) Louise Brough / (Australia) John Bromwich defeated (United States) Gussie Moran / (Ecuador) Pancho Segura 6–3, 6–1

Preceded by 1947 Wimbledon Championships	Grand Slams	Succeeded by 1948 Australian Championships
