= 1946 French Championships (tennis) =

- Date: 18 – 28 July 1946
- Edition: 45th
- Category: 16th Grand Slam (ITF)
- Surface: Clay
- Location: Paris (XVI^{e}), France
- Venue: Stade Roland Garros

Champions

Men's singles
- (France) Marcel Bernard

Women's singles
- (United States) Margaret Osborne

Men's doubles
- (France) Marcel Bernard / (France) Yvon Petra

Women's doubles
- (United States) Louise Brough / (United States) Margaret Osborne duPont

Mixed doubles
- (United States) Pauline Betz / (United States) Budge Patty
- French Championships

The 1946 French Championships (now known as the French Open) was a tennis tournament that took place on the outdoor clay courts at the Stade Roland-Garros in Paris, France. The tournament ran from 18 July until 28 July. It was the 50th staging of the French Championships and the first one held after a six-year hiatus due to World War II. In 1946 and 1947 the French Championships were held after Wimbledon and were thus the third Grand Slam tennis event of the year. Marcel Bernard and Margaret Osborne won the singles titles.

== Finals ==
=== Men's singles ===
(France) Marcel Bernard defeated (Czechoslovakia) Jaroslav Drobný 3–6, 2–6, 6–1, 6–4, 6–3

=== Women's singles ===
(United States) Margaret Osborne defeated (United States) Pauline Betz 1–6, 8–6, 7–5

=== Men's doubles ===
(France) Marcel Bernard / (France) Yvon Petra defeated (Argentina) Enrique Morea / (Ecuador) Pancho Segura 7–5, 6–3, 0–6, 1–6, 10–8

=== Women's doubles ===
(United States) Louise Brough / (United States) Margaret Osborne defeated (United States) Pauline Betz / (United States) Doris Hart 6–4, 0–6, 6–1

=== Mixed doubles ===
(United States) Pauline Betz / (United States) Budge Patty defeated (United States) Dorothy Bundy / (United States) Tom Brown 7–5, 9–7

Preceded by 1946 Wimbledon Championships	Grand Slams	Succeeded by 1946 U.S. National Championships
