= California State Pro Championships =

Defunct tennis tournament
- Tour: Pro Tennis Tour (1929, 1946, 1953, 1965)
- Founded: 1929; 96 years ago
- Abolished: 1967; 58 years ago
- Location: Los Angeles; Monterey
- Venue: Beverly-Wilshire TC (1946, 1953)
- Surface: Asphalt / outdoor

The California State Pro Championships also known as the California Professional Championships was a men's ineternational professional tennis tournament founded in 1929. It was first played in Los Angeles, United States, until 1965 when it was discontinued.

== History ==
The California Pro Championships was a men's tennis tournament established in May 1929. It was first played on outdoor asphalt courts Los Angeles, United States. In 1965 the fourth and final edition was also played Monterey, California and was won by Pancho Segura. It was discontinued thereafter.

== Finals ==
=== Men's singles ===
(Incomplete roll)

Year	Location	Champions	Runners-up	Score
1929	Los Angeles	(United States) Harvey Snodgrass	(United States) Howard Kinsey	3–1 sets.
1946	Beverly Hills	(United States) Frank Kovacs	(United Kingdom) Fred Perry	6–1, 7–9, 6–2, 6–1.
1953	Beverly Hills	(United States) Pancho Gonzales	(United States) Don Budge	5–7, 6–2, 6–2
1965	Monterey	(United States) Pancho Segura	(Peru) Leoncio Collas	6–1, 6–3.

=== Men's doubles ===
Year	Location	Champions	Runners-up	Score
1953	Beverly Hills	(Romania) Constantin Tănăsescu (United States) Pancho Gonzales	(United States) Carl Earn (United States) John Faunce	6–3, 6–1
