= Pancho Segura =

Ecuadorian-American tennis player (1921–2017)

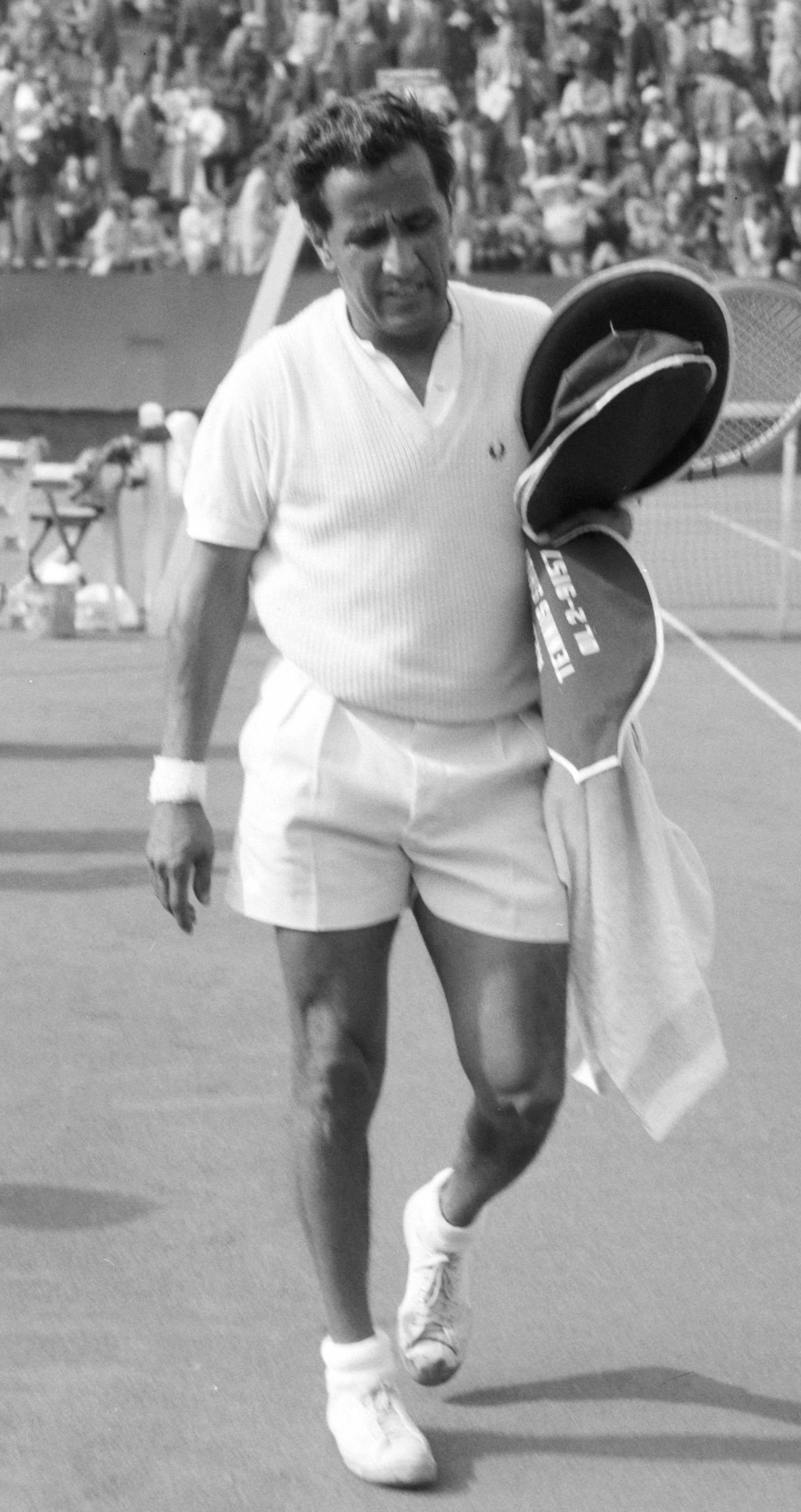
- Segura in 1961
- Full name: Francisco Olegario Segura Cano
- Country (sports): Ecuador; United States
- Born: June 20, 1921 Guayaquil, Ecuador
- Died: November 18, 2017 (aged 96) Carlsbad, California, U.S.
- Height: 5 ft 6 in (1.68 m)
- Turned pro: 1947 (amateur from 1939)
- Retired: 1970
- Plays: Right-handed (two-handed forehand, one-handed backhand)
- College: University of Miami
- Int. Tennis HoF: 1984 (member page)

Singles
- Career record: 1292-825 (61.0%)
- Career titles: 66
- Highest ranking: U.S. No. 1 professional (1950, USPLTA)

Grand Slam singles results
- French Open: 3R (1946)
- Wimbledon: 3R (1946)
- US Open: SF (1942, 1943, 1944, 1945)

Other tournaments
- Professional majors
- US Pro: W (1950, 1951, 1952)
- Wembley Pro: F (1951, 1957, 1959, 1960)
- French Pro: W (1950)
- Other pro events
- TOC: W (1957^{AU})

Grand Slam doubles results
- French Open: F (1946)
- Wimbledon: SF (1946)
- US Open: F (1944)

Grand Slam mixed doubles results
- US Open: F (1943, 1947)

Francisco Olegario Segura Cano (June 20, 1921 – November 18, 2017), better known as Pancho "Segoo" Segura, was a leading tennis player of the 1940s and 1950s, both as an amateur and as a professional. He was born in Guayaquil, Ecuador, but moved to the United States in 1940. Throughout his amateur career, he was listed by the USTA as a "foreign" player resident in the U.S. As a professional player, he was referred to as the "Ecuadorian champ who now lives in New York City". After acquiring U.S. citizenship in 1991 at age 70, Segura was a citizen of both countries.

Segura is the only player to have won the Cleveland/Forest Hills US Pro and International Pro titles on three different surfaces (which he did consecutively from 1950 to 1952). He won the inaugural professional Tournament of Champions at Sydney in 1957. He won the L.A. Masters tournament in 1958. In 1950, 1951, and 1952, as a professional, he was the U.S. No. 1 professional player in the USPLTA rankings and was ranked U.S. number one professional for 1950 and 1952 in the PTPA rankings.

Segura's most potent shot was considered to be his double-handed forehand. His less-potent backhand was single-handed. He played collegiate tennis at the University of Miami in Coral Gables, Florida.

== Early life ==
Segura was born on a bus traveling from Quevedo to Guayaquil, Ecuador, the first of seven children of Domingo Segura Paredes, Spanish in origin, and Fransisca Cano, an Indian from Quevedo. He almost died at his premature birth, then suffered from hernias and malaria. No more than 5 ft 6 in (1.68 m) tall, he had badly bowed legs from the rickets that he also had as a child. He learned playing tennis by hitting against a backboard at the Guayaquil Tennis Club where his father was the caretaker and he himself worked as a ball boy and servant. He decided to play with a double-handed forehand because it allowed him to hit with more power. Segura left school when he was age 12 to earn money for his family who lived in poverty. As he developed his game in his early teens, he began to get asked as a hitting partner by the club players.

In 1938, he represented Guayaquil in its annual tennis match against Quito and after winning his three matches was invited by Galo Plaza Lasso to participate in the Bolivarian Games. Segura won the gold medal in the singles event after a win in the final against Jorge Combariza. On return to Guayaquil, he was welcomed with a ticker-tape parade.

By the time he was 17, Segura had won a number of titles in Latin America. In 1939, he planned to go to France to develop his game, but the outbreak of World War II prevented this move. In Spring 1940, he was visited by American player Elwood Cooke, finalist at the 1939 Wimbledon Championships, on behalf of Wilson Sporting Goods. With Wilson's support, Segura travelled to the United States in June 1940 and arrived in New York on July 29.

== Amateur career ==
1940

Directly following his arrival in the United States Segura entered a grass court tournament at the Meadow Club in Southampton, Long Island. It was the first time he played on grass, and he lost in both the singles and doubles events. At the Eastern Clay Court Championships in East Orange, New Jersey, he took the first set against Jack Kramer but lost the match. In early September, he entered the U.S. National Championships for the first time and was drawn against fourth-seeded Frank Parker. Segura lost in straight sets despite leading 5–1 in the third set. In October, he won his first grass court match against the Irish Davis Cup player George Lyttleton Rogers at the Hispanic Tennis Club.

1941

Segura won the Brooklyn clay court championships in May beating Ladislav Hecht in the final. Hecht commented: "He'll be a great player in another year, just as soon as he makes circuit with older and smarter players. His baffling shots and unorthodox style will puzzle many a foe." He won the Hispano invitation event in August, beating Frank Bowden in the final. Segura lost in the second round of the U.S. Championships to Bryan Grant in five sets. "Segura had the usually sedate Forest Hills fans in the aisles with his attack, similar to that of Jack Bromwich, the double-fisted Australian. He was a strong crowd favorite but Grant drew a ringing round of applause for his comeback in the final set after Segura seemingly had him beaten down." Segura won the Dade County championships in December beating Gardnar Mulloy in the final. He "captured a four-set battle which had several hundred wild-eyed spectators almost standing on their heads." Segura then lost in the final of the Sugar Bowl to Ted Schroeder. "Segura, who amazed the crowd with his ability to retrieve seemingly impossible shots, won the first two sets before Schroeder, seeded No. 1, overcame wildness and began passing the Ecuadorean consistently".

1942

Segura won the Florida west coast title in February beating George Lyttleton Rogers in the final. Segura beat Bill Talbert to win the Cincinnati event in June. Segura successfully defended his title at Brooklyn in July, beating Hecht in the final in four sets. At the New Jersey state tournament the following week, Segura beat Vic Seixas and Budge Patty and then won the over Hecht without losing a game. The following week, Segura beat Schroeder to win the final of the Eastern Clay Court Championships. "Segura's two-handed drives down the sidelines kept Schroeder on the defensive throughout and afforded the Californian few opportunities to move in close. While Segura's emphasis was on speed, he threw in an occasional dropshot to add to Schroeder's discomfiture". Segura beat Mulloy to win the Longwood Bowl in August 1942. At the U.S. Championships, Segura beat Talbert before losing to Parker in the semi-finals. "And, regardless as to any plan Segura may have had in mind before the match started, he was at Parker's mercy at every stage of the duel". Segura beat Earl Bartlett to win the Sugar Bowl in December. Segura was offered a tennis scholarship by Gardnar Mulloy, tennis coach at the University of Miami, and he entered in the fall of 1942. He won the National Collegiate Singles Championship in 1943, 1944, and 1945.

1943

Segura won the Pan American championships in Mexico City in January, beating Talbert in the final in five sets. He won the Miami tournament over Campbell Gillespie in February. Segura won New Jersey event in July over Robert Odman. Segura beat Joe Hunt in the final of the Eastern Grass Court Championships in August. "Segura, now a student In Florida, was on the top of his game while Hunt weakened rapidly following the first set. After being trounced soundly in the second, the sailor changed to spiked shoes in hopes of turning the tide but gained little benefit". The following week, Segura beat Sidney Wood to win Southampton invitation. Despite having won several tournaments in the weeks before the U.S. Championships, Segura lost in the semi-finals of the event to Jack Kramer. Segura won the Pan American championships in Mexico City over Talbert in October.

1944

In June, Segura won US clay court event and the following week won at Cincinnati (both over Talbert). Pancho won the Western states tournament in July over Talbert in five sets in which both player had suffered leg injuries and had to take time out for treatment. Segura won Southampton invitation with a victory over McNeill in August. Segura lost to Talbert in five sets in the semi-finals of the U.S. Championships. "What made Talbert's victory so surprising was the fact that it was achieved in five strength-sapping sets. The Indianapolis lad was rated as a 'sprinter' by most experts, and figured to lack the vitality to win over the route. But Bill more than balanced in strategy what he spotted the energetic Ecuadorian in stamina." Segura won the Pan American championships at Mexico City in October (again beating Talbert in the final).

1945

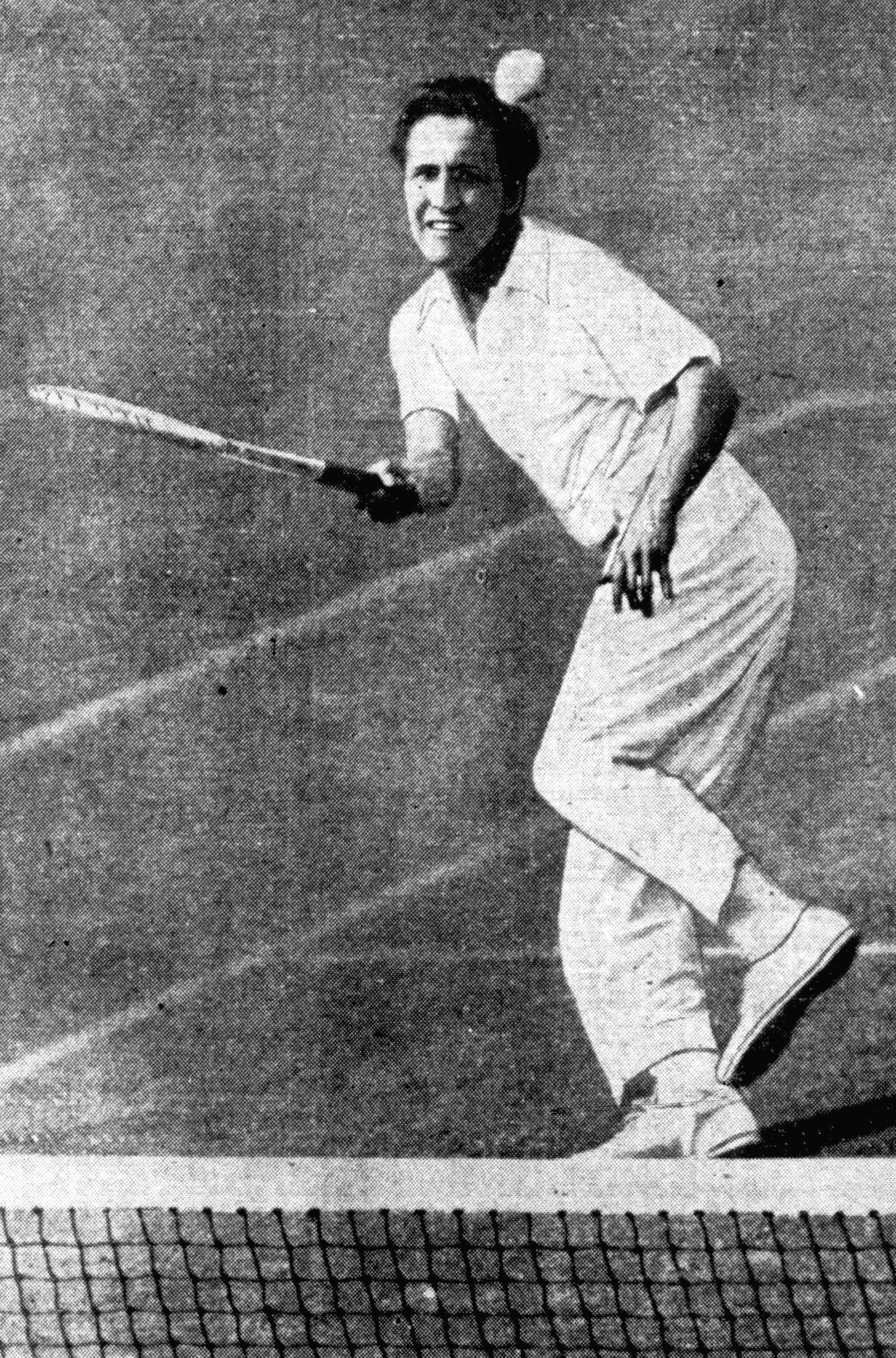
Segura, c. 1945

Segura won the Roney Plaza event at Miami in May over Charles Harris. At the U.S. Clay Court Championships in July, Talbert beat Segura in a five-set final. At the U.S. Championships, Segura beat Bob Falkenburg and then lost to Talbert in the semi-finals. "Charging the net with effectiveness as he and Talbert squared off in the famed center court, Pancho forged into a 4-to-l lead as Talbert netted shot after shot. But then Talbert rammed back through Segura's service three straight times, lost his own once and put the set away by ruining Segura's delivery with cross court drop shots in the twelfth game. From there on it was no contest. Pancho tried but he just didn't have it".

1946

Segura won the US Indoors event over defending champion McNeill in March. "The South American parlayed superb passing shot and an uncanny defensive game into the triumph that took the title out of the United States for the first time since Jean Borotra carted it to France in 1931". In April, he won the Miami tournament over Talbert. Segura won the title at Queens over Dinny Pails in June. "Segura walked off the court a very tired man. But, although near exhaustion, he summoned just sufficient reserve strength in the final set to retrieve enough shots to win". Segura lost in the last 16 of the French championships in July to eventual winner Marcel Bernard. "In the most spectacular match of the tournament to date Roland Garros stadium echoed with Segura's cry of 'Oh Pancho' with which he berated his own mistakes." Segura lost to Mulloy in the quarter-finals of the U.S. Championships in four sets.

1947

Segura won La Jolla Beach and Tennis Club tournament over Tom Falkenburg in February. Kramer wrote that Segura lost "without distinction (to Tom Brown and Jaroslav Drobný) the two times he played Wimbledon, and really, nobody took Segoo seriously. He didn't speak English well, he had a freak shot, and on the grass while scooting around in his long white pants with his bowlegs, he looked like a little butterball. A dirty butterball: his pants were always grass-stained". Segura won Southampton invitation over Seymour Greenberg in August. Segura lost to Parker in the quarter-finals of the U.S. Championships. Segura won the title at São Paulo in November beating Parker in the final and beat Parker again later that month in the final in Rio de Janeiro.

== Professional career ==
1948

Long before Open Tennis, Segura turned professional in 1947 and was an immediate crowd-pleaser with his winning smile, infectiously humorous manner, and unorthodox but deadly game. According to Bobby Riggs, Jack Harris (the promoter of the forthcoming Riggs-Kramer tour for 1948) attempted to sign Ted Schroeder to play the preliminary matches of the tour. Ultimately he failed and instead signed Segura to play the latest Australian amateur champion, Dinny Pails. Instead of a percentage of the gross receipts, as Riggs and Kramer were contracted for, Segura and Pails were each paid $300 per week. Segura lost the tour 44–26. At the US Pro championships at Forest Hills in June 1948, Segura lost in the quarter-finals against Frank Kovacs."Segura held command over Kovacs through the first two sets when the Californian was never able to break his opponent's service. But in the third game of the third set, Kovacs cracked through to assume a 2–1 lead and he grew progressively stronger from that point."

1949

Segura lost a tough match to Kramer in five sets in the semi-finals at the Wembley Pro championships in June. "When Kramer made a lot of bad shots at the beginning of the fifth set and Segura reached 3–1, it appeared as if the champion was facing a defeat. Yet it was the gallant little Segura who faltered and allowed the champion to crawl home." Kramer also beat Segura in the semi-finals of the tournament at Scarborough in July.

1950

Segura won the 1949–1950 tour against Frank Parker 63–12 (they played the preliminary match each night before Kramer and Pancho Gonzales took to the court). Segura won a four-man tournament at Paris in January. In the semi-final of the 1950 U.S. Pro Championship held in Cleveland on clay, Segura won a five-set match over Kramer and then beat Kovacs in the final. Segura was rated the U.S. number one professional for 1950 by the U.S. Professional Lawn Tennis Association as well as by the PTPA.

1951

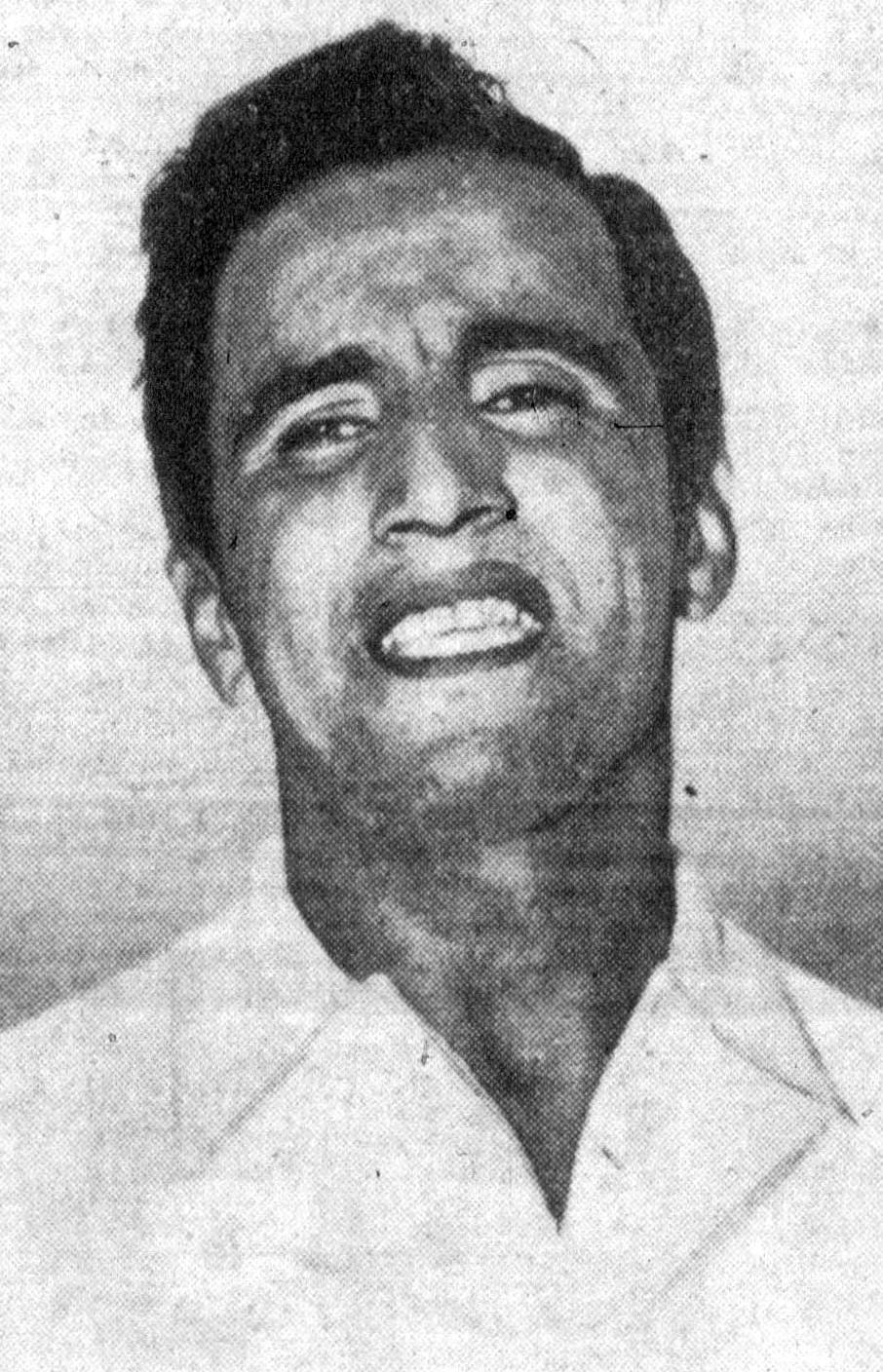
Segura, c. 1951

In the 1950–1951 world professional tour in which Segura played the headline match against Kramer, he was beaten 64 matches to 28, a noticeably better performance than Gonzales's record of 29 victories and 94 defeats against Kramer the previous year. Segura won the Canadian Professional Championships title in June beating Kovacs in the final, but he lost the Cleveland International Pro or U.S. Pro final to Kovacs in a five-set match. Segura's won the 1951 U.S. Pro Championship, played on soggy grass courts at the West Side Tennis Club in Forest Hills, over Pancho Gonzales in the concluding match. It was their first encounter on grass, and Allison Danzig of The New York Times wrote "Segura extracted the sting from Gonzales's potent service and net attack with virulence and accuracy of his calculated counter-measures until the big Californian was all but helpless under the relentless pressure on the wet turf in the final set." He was ranked the number one U.S. professional ranking by the USPLTA for 1951. He was ranked the No. 2 U.S. professional by the PTPA behind Kovacs. Segura won a tournament at Berlin in September, beating Gonzales in the concluding round robin. Segura lost to Gonzales in four sets in the final at Wembley in September. Segura won a four-man tournament at the Bygdøhus Arena in Oslo in October, beating Carl Earn in the semi-finals and Gonzales in the final.

1952

Segura won the U. S. Pro Clay Court title at St. Augustine in March beating Riggs in the final. Segura won the U. S. Pro or International Professional Championships (billed title) at Cleveland on cement in June over Budge and Gonzales. Segura won the Canadian Pro in June at Quebec City on clay beating Budge in the final. Segura won a three-day Roland Garros round-robin event in Paris in late June after victories against Budge, Gonzales, and Kramer. Segura won a four-man event in Stockholm in October, beating Riggs in the first match and Budge in the final. For the calendar year of 1952, Segura was ranked as the U.S. No. 1 professional player by the U.S. Professional Lawn Tennis Association for the third straight year. The PTPA ranked Segura as U.S. number one professional ahead of Gonzales in second place.

1953

In 1953, Segura was reduced to playing the preliminary match on the World Series tour, where he beat the Australian Ken McGregor 72 matches to 24. In July, Segura won a round robin in Caracas, beating Frank Sedgman, McGregor, and Kramer. On August 1, 1953, Segura won the Slazenger Professional Championship at Scarborough, England on grass (an event dubbed by the media "the pro Wimbledon"). He won five-set matches over McGregor in the semi-final and Sedgman in the final. Segura won a four-man tournament in Munich in September, beating Sedgman in the final. Segura beat Sedgman in the Lyon final (another 4-man event) in November to bring the year to a close. In June, the Players Committee of Jack March's Cleveland U.S. Pro or "World's Professional Championship" tournament ranked Segura second.

1954

Segura participated in a World Series tour with Gonzales, Sedgman, and Budge (who was replaced by Riggs and Earn). Gonzales won the series with Segura finishing second. Segura was runner-up to Gonzales in the 1954 U.S. Pro final at the Los Angeles Tennis Club, losing a five-set final. Segura won the Pacific Coast Pro at Beverly Hills in August over Gonzales in a three-set final. At the inaugural Australian Pro, held at the Subiaco Oval in Perth in November, Segura beat Gonzales and then in the final to Sedgman. Segura was ranked second in 1954 by International Professional Tennis Association.

1955

Segura faced Gonzales in the final at Cleveland in April 1955. This event was played under Van Alen Simplified Scoring System (VASSS) with 21-point sets and the server was only allowed one serve instead of two. In the final, Segura lost to Gonzales in five VASSS sets. Segura toured Europe with Gonzales, McGregor, and Fred Perry in Summer 1955. Segura was ranked second in 1955 by International Professional Tennis Association.

1956

In 1955–1956, Gonzales and Tony Trabert played the feature match of the World Series tour. Segura beat Rex Hartwig 56–22 (Segura and Hartwig played the preliminary match each evening, usually in a single set format). Segura beat Trabert in the final of the Hamilton Pro in Bermuda in April. Segura beat Trabert in the semi-finals at the VASSS event in April in Cleveland and then lost to Gonzales in the final. "Although Gonzales said he would not 'participate in another championship if the ping-pong scoring system is used', Segura said he was for it, claiming it made the matches more even". The event returned to traditional scoring in 1957.

1957

In February 1957, Segura won the inaugural Ampol Tournament of Champions at White City, Sydney, the richest tournament of the year. The TOC was the most prestigious series of pro tournaments in the late 1950s, and the Australian version was funded by Ampol, the Australian oil company. Segura defeated Hartwig in five sets in the first round, came from behind to beat Gonzales at 13–11 in the fifth set in the semi-final, and won in three straight sets over Sedgman in the final. Segura regarded it as his greatest tournament win. Kramer designated the Sydney tournament as one of the four major professional tournaments, together with Kooyong, Forest Hills, and L.A. Masters. Segura beat Pails in a North American tour that was the undercard tour for the World Series (the main contest featured Gonzales against Ken Rosewall). Segura beat Rosewall in the semi-finals at Cleveland in April, but lost to Gonzales in the final. Segura beat Gonzales in the semi-finals at Wembley in September, but lost in the final to Rosewall in five sets.

1958

Segura lost a North American tour to Trabert by a narrow margin (this tour was a World Series undercard tour. The main contest featured Gonzales against Lew Hoad). In May, Segura won the Alaska Pro championships, beating Trabert in the final. In July, Segura won the L.A. Masters Pro Championship in Los Angeles. Segura defeated all six opponents in a round-robin format, Gonzales, Hoad, Rosewall, Trabert, Sedgman, and Hartwig. Kramer designated the L.A. Masters as one of the four major professional tournaments, together with Forest Hills, Kooyong, and Sydney.

1959

At the Wembley Pro in September, part of the Ampol world series of tournaments, Segura beat Hoad and Trabert and then to Mal Anderson in a five-set final. "Anderson's singles final with Segura was a memorable one, and not until the last few games of the deciding set did he really get on top of an opponent sixteen years older than himself". On October 25, 1959, Segura won the Ramat Gan tournament at Tel Aviv in Israel, beating Anderson, Ashley Cooper, and Mervyn Rose. Segura defeated Hoad (the winner of the Ampol series) three times that year in the series: at Melbourne for thirrd place, at Wembley in the second round, and in the final event at Kooyong in the round robin.

1960

Segura participated in a four-man World series with Gonzales (world champion since 1954), Rosewall and Alex Olmedo (Trabert also played matches early). Gonzales won the series. At Wembley, Segura beat Hoad in the quarter-finals. "Segura twinkled and dazzled, scuttling about the court at a speed that made it impossible for anyone to believe that he was 39 years old". In the semi-finals, Segura overcame Sedgman. "Towards the end of his three-hour semifinal with Sedgman he showed signs of tiring. He missed chances that might have given him an earlier victory, yet he still was able to make the final effort that gave him a break in the ninth game of the fifth set and the match". Segura lost to Rosewall in the final.

1961

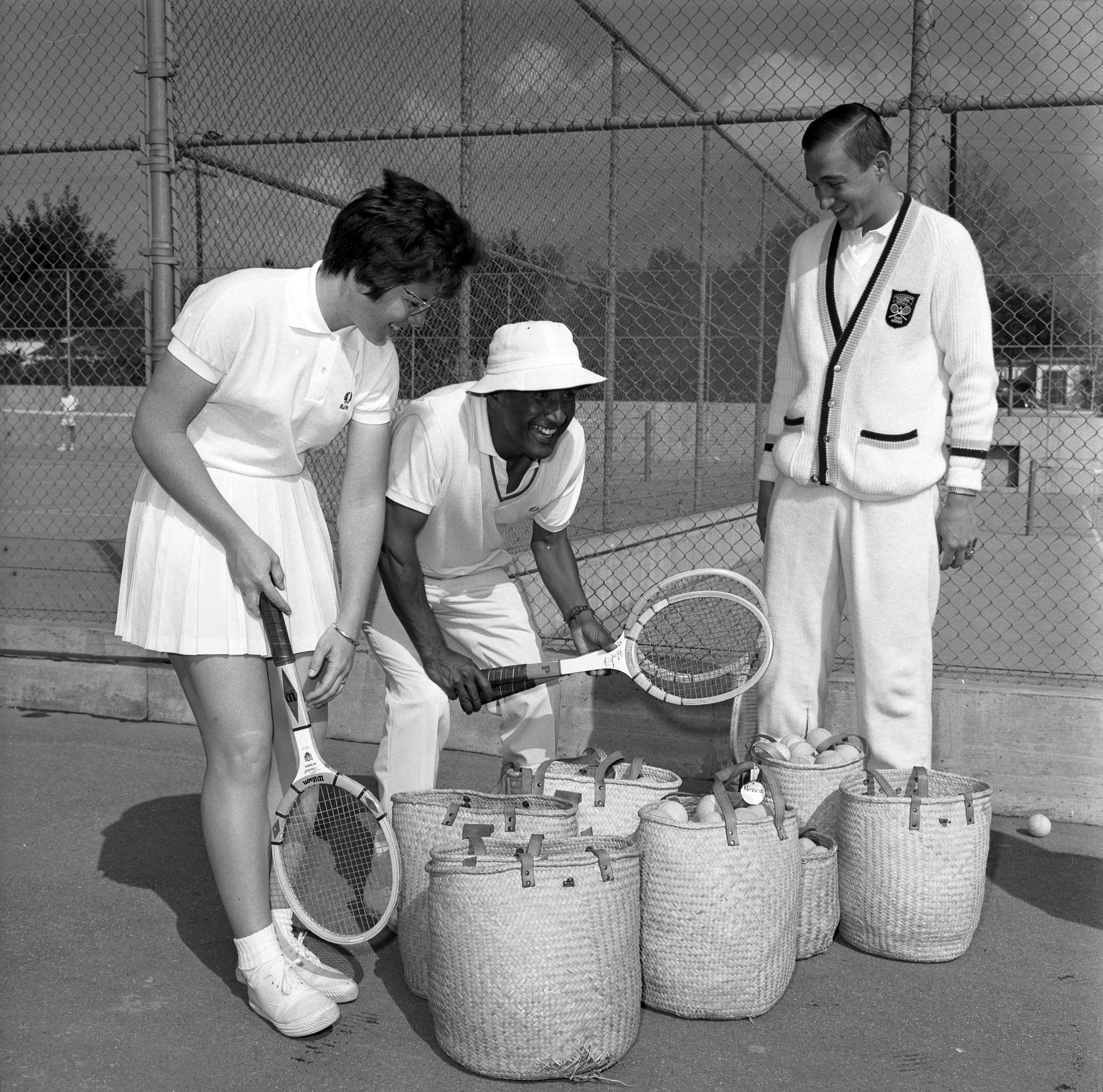
Billie Jean King, Pancho Segura, and Stan Smith at a tennis clinic in Los Angeles (1966).

Segura won four-man tournaments in São Paulo and Rio de Janeiro in May while touring South America with Cooper, Olmedo, and Butch Buchholz. Segura won the San Remo event in July over Hoad and Andrés Gimeno and then won the Viareggio event over Hoad and Trabert. At Noordwijk in early August, Segura beat Gonzales, Trabert, and Gimeno in the final to win the title.

1962

Segura lost to Buchholz in the Cleveland final in May 1962 when he was age 40. On August 5, 1962, Segura won the Dutch Pro Championships at The Hague, Holland, on red clay, beating Ayala, Hoad, and Olmedo. At Cave de Tirreni in August, Segura beat Ayala, Olmedo, and Anderson to win the title. On August 15, 1962, Segura won the pro tournament at Cannes, France, beating Ayala, Olmedo, and Hoad.

1963–1970

Segura won the California State Pro Championships at Monterrey in August 1965 (beating Leonzie Collas in the final). He won the Fresno tournament in October 1965, beating Nick Carter in the final. At Binghamton Pro in July 1966, Segura, at ahr 45, beat Rosewall in the semi-finals and then lost in the final to Rod Laver. At the Fresno tournament in October 1966, Segura retained his title (beating Barry MacKay in the final). Segura also won the USPLTA title at Milwaukee in November 1966, beating Mike Davies in the final. As the Open era arrived, Segura's career was coming to an end. He entered the 1968 US Open, and after a bye in the first round and a straight-sets win against Ian Crookenden, he lost in the third round to Laver. His final Grand Slam singles appearance was at 1970 US Open aged 49, where he beat Atet Wijono and then lost to Tito Vazquez in the second round.

== Playing style ==
He had fast footwork and a two-handed forehand that his frequent adversary and tennis promoter Jack Kramer once called the greatest single shot ever produced in tennis.

Ellsworth Vines gives an analysis of Segura's unusual playing style in his book Tennis: Myth and Method (1978):

Two-handed forehand is most outstanding stroke in game's history; unbeatable unless opponent could avoid it. Improved as a professional by taking advantage of volleying ability he rarely used as an amateur. Backhand also better later in career. Returns serve brilliantly, particularly off right side where quicksilver moves give him unusual positioning talent. Serve only average for his class of player but well placed, as is overhead. Very deft volleyer, particularly off forehand. Lob and dropshot unsurpassed. Superb passing shots, change of pace, and absolute consistency make him greatest "little man" to ever play the game.

Kramer and Hoad regarded Segura's two-handed forehand as the greatest single tennis stroke that they had ever faced. According to Kramer,

Possibly Budge's backhand was the best pure stroke in tennis. I accept that judgment. \Now put a gun to my head, and I'd have to say that the Segura's forehand was better because he could disguise it so well, and hit so many more angles.

Kramer also states that Segura:

never learned to exploit his great forehand weapon because he used it too often. He didn't know how to pace himself and pick his spots. Perhaps he was too quick for his own good; he was so fast he could run around anything and get to his forehand. He probably hit his forehand four times as much as his backhand. Segoo ran too far and wasted his energy in the process.

== Career assessment ==
In his 1979 autobiography Kramer included Segura in his list of the 21 greatest players of all time. (Note: Writing in 1979, Kramer considered the best ever to have been either Don Budge (for consistent play) or Ellsworth Vines (at the height of his game). The next four best were, chronologically, Bill Tilden, Fred Perry, Bobby Riggs, and Pancho Gonzales. After these six came the "second echelon" of Rod Laver, Lew Hoad, Ken Rosewall, Gottfried von Cramm, Ted Schroeder, Jack Crawford, Pancho Segura, Frank Sedgman, Tony Trabert, John Newcombe, Arthur Ashe, Stan Smith, Björn Borg, and Jimmy Connors. He felt unable to rank Henri Cochet and René Lacoste accurately but felt they were among the very best.)

Kramer stated "and while his amateur record is of no consequence, he beat everyone in the pros but Gonzales and me. We beat him with good second serves". A year earlier, Ellsworth Vines, the man that Kramer called the greatest player of all time at the height of his game, had published a lesser-known book called Tennis: Myth and Method, co-written with Gene Vier. Vines devotes the first part of the book to individual chapters about the 10 greatest tennis players from Don Budge through the date of the book's publication. He considered Segura to be the fifth best of these 10 great players, behind, in order, Budge, Kramer, Gonzales, and Rod Laver. Segura, however, ranked above Bobby Riggs, Ken Rosewall, Lew Hoad, Frank Sedgman, and Tony Trabert.

Segura, writes Kramer, probably played "more matches against top players than anyone in history. Besides my couple hundred, he must have played Gonzales a hundred and fifty, and Budge, Sedgman, Riggs, Hoad, and Rosewall all around fifty apiece. I beat him about 80 percent of the time, and Gonzales also held an edge over him. Pails beat him 41–31 on the Kramer-Riggs tour, but that was when Segoo was still learning how to play fast surfaces. With everybody else, he had the edge: Sedgman, Rosewall, Hoad, Trabert, McGregor".

== Retirement ==
In 1962, on the recommendation of good friend Mike Franks, Segura became the teaching professional at the Beverly Hills Tennis Club, replacing Carl Earn. Most of Segura's students were movie stars.

Segura also found time to coach Jimmy Connors, Tracy Austin, Charlie Pasarell, and Stan Smith as well as his son Spencer Segura, who played at UCLA, and is a lawyer/investor. In 1971, he left Beverly Hills to become the head teaching professional at the La Costa Resort in Carlsbad, California, where he eventually retired. He is widely credited with having mentored and structured the playing game of Jimmy Connors, starting at age 16, in 1968, when his mother, Gloria, brought him to Pancho in California for lessons. Dr. Abraham Verghese describes taking a tennis lesson from Segura during this period in his book The Tennis Partner.

Before the famous "Battle of the Sexes" tennis match between Billie Jean King and Bobby Riggs in 1973, Segura openly supported Riggs. When King won the match, Segura declared disgustedly that Riggs was only the third-best senior player, behind himself and Gardnar Mulloy. He challenged King to another match, which King refused.

In the 1966 episode of I Dream of Jeannie titled "Always on Sunday", Segura made an appearance as himself.

Segura retired from playing Singles after the 1970 US Open at Forest Hills at age 49. He was inducted into the International Tennis Hall of Fame in Newport, Rhode Island in 1984. Segura became an American citizen in 1991.

== Death ==
Segura died on November 18, 2017 at the age of 96 at his home in Carlsbad, California, from complications related to Parkinson's disease. A memorial service was held at the Beverly Hills Tennis Club on December 17, 2017, with 200 in attendance.

== Major career finals ==
=== Grand Slam ===
==== Doubles (2 runner-ups) ====
Result	Year	Championship	Surface	Partner	Opponents	Score
Loss	1944	U.S. Championships	Grass	(United States) Bill Talbert	(United States) Don McNeill (United States) Bob Falkenburg	5–7, 4–6, 6–3, 1–6
Loss	1946	French Championships	Clay	(Argentina) Enrique Morea	(France) Marcel Bernard (France) Yvon Petra	5–7, 3–6, 6–0, 6–1, 8–10

==== Mixed doubles (2 runner-ups) ====
Result	Year	Championship	Surface	Partner	Opponents	Score
Loss	1943	U.S. Championships	Grass	(United States) Pauline Betz	(United States) Margaret Osborne (United States) Bill Talbert	8–10, 4–6
Loss	1947	U.S. Championships	Grass	(United States) Gussie Moran	(United States) Louise Brough (Australia) John Bromwich	3–6, 1–6

=== Pro Slams ===
==== Singles (3 titles, 8 runner-ups) ====
Result	Year	Championship	Surface	Opponent	Score
Win	1950	US Pro	Clay (i)	(United States) Frank Kovacs	6–1, 1–6, 8–6, 4–4 ret.
Loss	1951	Wembley Pro	Indoor	(United States) Pancho Gonzales	2–6, 2–6, 6–2, 4–6
Win	1951	US Pro	Grass	(United States) Pancho Gonzales	6–3, 6–4, 6–2
Win	1952	US Pro	Indoor	(United States) Pancho Gonzales	3–6, 6–4, 3–6, 6–4, 6–0
Loss	1954	US Pro	Cement	(United States) Pancho Gonzales	4–6, 6–4, 6–2, 2–6, 4–6
Loss	1955	US Pro	Indoor	(United States) Pancho Gonzales	19–21, 21–19, 19–21, 22–20, 19–21
Loss	1956	US Pro	Indoor	(United States) Pancho Gonzales	19–21, 21–19, 19–21, 20–22
Loss	1957	Wembley Pro	Indoor	(Australia) Ken Rosewall	6–1, 3–6, 4–6, 6–3, 4–6
Loss	1957	US Pro	Indoor	(United States) Pancho Gonzales	3–6, 6–3, 5–7, 1–6
Loss	1959	Wembley Pro	Indoor	(Australia) Mal Anderson	6–4, 4–6, 6–3, 3–6, 6–8
Loss	1960	Wembley Pro	Indoor	(Australia) Ken Rosewall	7–5, 6–8, 1–6, 3–6
Loss	1962	US Pro	Indoor	(United States) Butch Buchholz	4–6, 3–6, 4–6

== Performance timeline ==
=== Singles ===
Segura joined the professional tennis circuit in 1948 and as a consequence was banned from competing in the amateur Grand Slams until the start of the Open Era at the 1968 French Open. Segura won one Tournament of Champions.

Key
W	F	SF	QF	#R	RR	Q#	DNQ	A	NH

(W) winner; (F) finalist; (SF) semifinalist; (QF) quarterfinalist; (#R) rounds 4, 3, 2, 1; (RR) round-robin stage; (Q#) qualification round; (DNQ) did not qualify; (A) absent; (NH) not held; (SR) strike rate (events won / competed); (W–L) win–loss record.

	1941	1942	1943	1944	1945	1946	1947	1948	1949	1950	1951		1952	1953	1954		1955	1956	1957	1958	1959	1960	1961	1962	1963	1964	1965	1966	1967	1968	1969	1970	SR	W–L	Win %
Grand Slam tournaments																																	0 / 12	27–12	69%
Australian	not held					A	A	not eligible																							A	A	0 / 0	0–0	–
French	not held					3R	A	not eligible																						A	A	A	0 / 1	2–1	67%
Wimbledon	not held					3R	1R	not eligible																						A	A	A	0 / 2	2–2	50%
U.S.	2R	SF	SF	SF	SF	QF	QF	not eligible																						3R	A	2R	0 / 9	23–9	72%
Pro Slam tournaments																																	3 / 37	63–34	65%
U.S. Pro	A	A	A	NH	A	A	A	QF	A	W	F	W	W	A	SF	F	F	F	F	SF	SF	SF	A	F	QF	QF	QF	1R	QF				3 / 19	32–16	67%
French Pro	not held																	A	NH	QF	QF	QF	SF	QF	A	A	QF	A	A				0 / 6	7–6	54%
Wembley Pro	not held								SF	A	F		SF	SF	NH		NH	SF	F	QF	F	F	SF	SF	A	A	QF	A	A				0 / 12	24–12	67%
Win–loss	1–1	4–1	3–1	3–1	3–1	7–3	4–2	2–1	2–1	4–0	10–2		6–1	2–1	4–2		2–1	4–2	4–2	2–3	5–3	4–3	4–2	4–3	0–1	1–1	3–3	0–1	0–1	1–1	0–0	1–1	3 / 49	90–46	66%
Other important Pro tournaments																																	1 / 6	7–14	33%
TOC (US)	not held																		6th	5th	QF	not held											0 / 3	3–9	25%
TOC (Aus.)	not held																		W	5th	QF	not held											1 / 3	4–5	44%

The results of the Pro Tours are not listed here.
