= 1946 Kentucky Derby =

Horse race

72nd Kentucky Derby
- Kentucky Derby
- Grade I stakes race
- Location: Churchill Downs
- Date: May 4, 1946
- Winning horse: Assault
- Jockey: Warren Mehrtens
- Trainer: Max Hirsch
- Owner: King Ranch
- Surface: Dirt

The 1946 Kentucky Derby was the 72nd running of the Kentucky Derby. The race took place on May 4, 1946, on a track rated slow.

== Full results ==
| Finished | Post | Horse | Jockey | Trainer | Owner | Time / behind |
|---|---|---|---|---|---|---|
| 1st | 3 | Assault | Warren Mehrtens | Max Hirsch | King Ranch | 2:06 3/5 |
| 2nd | 5 | Spy Song | Johnny Longden | Jack C. Hodgins | Dixiana Farm | |
| 3rd | 11 | Hampden | Job Dean Jessop | Richard E. Handlen | Foxcatcher Farm | |
| 4th | 1 | Lord Boswell | Eddie Arcaro | James W. Smith | Maine Chance Farm | |
| 5th | 1C | Knock Down | Robert Permane | James W. Smith | Maine Chance Farm | |
| 6th | 6 | Alamond | Arnold Kirkland | John H. Skirvin | Alwin C. Ernst | |
| 7th | 14 | Bob Murphy | Albert Bodiou | Charlie Sanborn | David Ferguson | |
| 8th | 7 | Pellicle | George F. Hettinger | E. Leigh Cotton | Hal Price Headley | |
| 9th | 1A | Perfect Bahram | Ted Atkinson | James W. Smith | Maine Chance Farm | |
| 10th | 2 | Rippey | Ferril Zufelt | Edward L. Synder | William Helis | |
| 11th | 15 | Jobar | J. Raymond Layton | Don Yates | H. W. Fielding | |
| 12th | 10 | Dark Jungle | Andy Loturco | John M. Goode | Lucas B. Combs | |
| 13th | 13 | Alworth | Ovie Scurlock | John B. Partridge | Mrs. R. D. Patterson | |
| 14th | 9 | With Pleasure | Charles Wahler | E. G. Porter | Brolite Farm | |
| 15th | 4 | Marine Victory | Donnie Alvin Padgett | Albert Dunne | Bobanet Stable | |
| 16th | 8 | Wee Admiral | William Watson | Arthur Brent | Col. R. S. McLaughlin | |
| 17th | 12 | Kendor | Willie Lee Johnson | R. S. Young | Mrs. D. Hollingsworth | |

- Winning breeder: King Ranch (TX)
