= Robert Kimbrell =

American tennis player (1923–2010)

- Full name: Robert Orr Kimbrell
- Country (sports): United States
- Born: October 17, 1923 Los Angeles, California, United States
- Died: September 19, 2010 (aged 86) Downey, California, United States

Grand Slam mixed doubles results
- US Open: F (1946)

Robert Orr Kimbrell (October 17, 1923 – September 19, 2010) was an American tennis player.

Born in Los Angeles, Kimbrell was active as a tennis player during the 1940s. He won the singles title at the 1944 Santa Monica championships, defeating the top–seed Pride Morey Lewis in the final, and finished runner–up in mixed doubles at the 1946 U.S. National Championships, partnering Louise Brough.

Kimbrell competed in collegiate tennis for the USC Trojans while studying engineering and was a member of the Skull and Dagger society. He was married to fellow USC alumnus Marjorie Meeker. After finishing college, Kimbrell settled in Downey and spent over three decades working for the Los Angeles County Flood Control District.

== Grand Slam finals ==
=== Mixed doubles (1 runner-up) ===
Result	Year	Championship	Surface	Partner	Opponents	Score
Loss	1946	U.S. Championships	Grass	(United States) Louise Brough	(United States) Margaret Osborne duPont (United States) Bill Talbert	3–6, 4–6
