= Jack Kramer =

American tennis player (1921–2009)

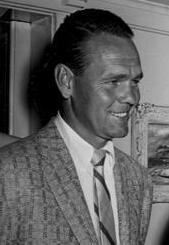
- Kramer in the late 1940s
- Full name: John Albert Kramer
- Country (sports): United States
- Born: August 1, 1921 Las Vegas, Nevada, U.S.
- Died: September 12, 2009 (aged 88) Bel Air, California, U.S.
- Height: 6 ft 2 in (1.88 m)
- Turned pro: November 1947 (first senior amateur event 1937)
- Retired: 1954
- Plays: Right-handed (one-handed backhand)
- College: Rollins College
- Int. Tennis HoF: 1968 (member page)

Singles
- Career record: 707–305 (69.8%)
- Career titles: 35
- Highest ranking: no. 1 (1946, Pierre Gillou, Harry Hopman)

Grand Slam singles results
- Wimbledon: W (1947)
- US Open: W (1946, 1947)

Other tournaments
- Professional majors
- US Pro: W (1948)
- Wembley Pro: W (1949)
- French Pro: F (1950)

Grand Slam doubles results
- Wimbledon: W (1946, 1947)
- US Open: W (1940, 1941, 1943, 1947)

Grand Slam mixed doubles results
- US Open: W (1941)

Team competitions
- Davis Cup: W (1946, 1947)

John Albert Kramer (August 1, 1921 – September 12, 2009) was an American tennis player of the 1940s and 1950s, and a pioneer promoter who helped drive the sport towards professionalism at the elite level. Kramer also ushered in the serve-and-volley era in tennis, a playing style with which he won three Grand Slam tournaments (the U.S. Championships in 1946 and 1947, Wimbledon in 1947). He also led the U.S. Davis Cup tennis team to victory in the 1946 and 1947 Davis Cup finals.

Kramer won the U.S. Pro Championship at Forest Hills in 1948 and the Wembley Pro Championships in 1949. He won world professional championship 2-man tours in 1948 (against Bobby Riggs), 1949/50 (against Pancho Gonzales), 1950/51 (against Pancho Segura), and 1953 (against Frank Sedgman).

Kramer was ranked world no. 1 amateur player for 1946 by Pierre Gillou, Harry Hopman and Ned Potter. He was ranked world no. 1 amateur player for 1947 by John Olliff, Pierre Gillou and Ned Potter. In 1948 he was ranked the U.S. no. 1 professional in the USPLTA contemporary rankings for U.S. pro tennis play. Some recent tennis writers have considered Kramer to be the world no. 1 player from 1946 to 1953, spanning his last amateur years and early pro years.

He was the leading promoter of professional tennis tours in the 1950s and 1960s, signing many of the most accomplished tennis players of the era to professional contracts. Kramer played an important role in the establishment of modern men's Open-era tennis.

== Tennis career ==
=== Amateur player ===
Kramer began his tennis career by taking lessons from renowned teaching professional, Dick Skeen. Within a year, he was playing junior tournaments. He played on the Montebello High School tennis team with George Richards. Because of his obvious ability and his family's lack of money, he came under the guidance of Perry T. Jones. at the Los Angeles Tennis Club (LATC). Jones was the President of the Southern California Tennis Association (SCTA). Kramer traveled many hours each day from his home in Montebello, California, to play tennis at the LATC and the Beverly Hills Tennis Club. He was able to play against such great players as Ellsworth Vines, Bobby Riggs, and Bill Tilden. Kramer was the National Boys' Champion in 1936, and the winner of the 1938 National Juniors Interscholastics. He competed occasionally in men's tournaments on grass courts in the East. He won matches against nationally ranked men such as Elwood Cooke. Kramer also played with high school teammate George Richards, who later was nationally ranked.

Kramer competed at the U.S. National Championships seven times from 1938 through 1947. He lost his first match in 1938 in straight sets, winning only two games. At the 1939 U.S. Championships he was beaten in the second round by 11th-seeded and fellow Californian Joe Hunt. In 1940 Kramer defeated fourth-seeded Frank Parker in a five-set quarterfinal but lost to second-seeded and eventual champion Don McNeill in the semifinal. At the 1941 Championships, he was seeded for the first time, at no. 11, and reached the quarterfinal where third-seeded Frank Kovacs proved too strong. In 1942, Kramer won the men's singles in the Ojai Tennis Tournament. Kramer received a leave from his duties in the United States Coast Guard to compete at the 1943 Championships. Seeded second, he reached the final, despite being weakened by food poisoning, but lost it to Joe Hunt in four sets. During World War II, he continued to win prizes in the United States as the war had effectively put an end to international tennis, but did not compete in the U.S. Championships in 1944 and 1945.

The first Grand Slam tournament Kramer entered after the war was the 1946 Wimbledon Championships where he was seeded second but was upset in by Jaroslav Drobný in a five-set fourth round match. At the 1946 U.S. Championships, he was seeded third but managed to win his first Major singles title after a straight-set victory in the final against Tom Brown, losing just a single set in the tournament. He was ranked world no. 1 amateur in 1946 by Pierre Gillou, Harry Hopman and Ned Potter.

At the 1947 Wimbledon Championships, Kramer was seeded first and justified it by winning the title after another straight-sets win against Brown in a final that lasted only 48 minutes. At 1947 U.S. Championships, number one seed Kramer faced Frank Parker in the final. Parker won the first two sets as Kramer struggled to find form. Then, Kramer "changed suddenly from a stumbling novice to a raging perfectionist" and went on to win in five sets to retain his title. Kramer was ranked world no. 1 amateur in 1947 by John Olliff, Pierre Gillou and Ned Potter.

Kramer made his debut for the US Davis Cup team in 1939 in the final of the World Group against Australia. He and Joe Hunt lost the doubles match against John Bromwich and Adrian Quist. In 1946 and 1947 he was part of the winning US team, defeating Australia in both finals and winning all four of his singles matches. After 1947 he became ineligible to play for the Davis Cup on account of becoming a professional player. He compiled a Davis Cup match record of seven wins and two losses.

=== Professional player ===
1947

Kramer turned professional in November 1947, signing a $50,000 per year contract with promoter Jack Harris, the largest pro contract offer ever made to that point in the history of tennis. He made his pro debut against Bobby Riggs on December 26, 1947, at Madison Square Garden. 15,114 people showed up for the match in one of the worst snow storms in New York history to watch Riggs win.

1948

Kramer trailed Riggs on January 16 by an 8 to 6 edge, however Kramer had already begun to win more often by adopting a net-rushing style of play. The two players were tied at 14 to 14, and then Kramer took control as Riggs weakened, going on to win the tour against Riggs 69 to 20. Kramer beat Riggs in the final of the US Professional Championships at Forest Hills NY in June 1948 in four sets. Riggs "blew a 5-3 lead in that all-telling opening set, and after that he was licked, showing obvious fatigue even though he did manage to rally to win the third set". Kramer was awarded $1,450 for winning the singles, and $412 for winning the doubles. Kramer also won tours of South America and Australasia in 1948.

Kramer was ranked the no. 1 pro in the U.S. for 1948 by the USPLTA. The USPLTA no. 1 professional ranking was described as encompassing official recognition as the best professional player "in the United States", rather than a world no. 1 ranking. The professional rankings of the USPLTA and later of the PTPA were based on major professional tournament play in the United States. Those rankings apparently did not include consideration of the world pro tours, which were not inclusive events but restricted to a small group of usually two players. Some recent tennis writers have considered Kramer to be world no. 1 for the 1948 period with the observation on that period in one article that "in those days ranking systems were less organized and credible than today's computer-driven listings." Kramer was referred to as "world professional tennis champion" after the tour with Riggs was concluded.

1949

In early June 1949, Kramer won the Wembley Professional Championships in London, England, edging Segura in a close five-set semifinal, and defeating Riggs in the final. "Riggs set a fast pace in the first set, but he appeared to burn himself out in the early stages of the match". Kramer did not defend his U.S. Pro Championships title at Forest Hills N.Y., where Riggs defeated Budge in the final. However, Kramer won the Slazenger Pro at Scarborough, England in July 1949 beating Segura in the semifinal and Budge in the final. In early 1950, Kramer was described as "world champion in 1949". Kramer was not ranked by the USPLTA for 1949 due to insufficient play within the United States. Kramer did not play at Forest Hills or at the Philadelphia Indoor. Some recent tennis writers have considered Kramer to be world no. 1 for the 1949 period.

1950

In 1949–50, Kramer beat Pancho Gonzales 94 matches to 29 in the World Series. Kramer lost the final of the U.S. Pro Indoor at Philadelphia to Gonzales. At the U.S. Pro in June 1950 played at Cleveland on clay, Kramer lost a close five-set semifinal to Segura. Kramer was ranked U.S. no. 2 professional behind Segura for 1950 by the USPLTA. Some recent tennis writers have considered Kramer to be world no. 1 for the 1950 period. Kramer was described as "world professional champion" throughout 1950.

1951

In the 1950–51 World Series, Kramer beat Pancho Segura 64 matches to 28. Kramer won the Philadelphia U.S. Pro Indoor round robin event in March 1951, defeating Gonzales in the final.

At the Philadelphia U.S. Pro Indoor, the service "drives" (not "forehand drives" as sometimes reported) of a number of players were electronically measured and compared to Tilden's reported service "drive" speed of 151 mph made by stopwatch and film in 1931. The service speeds were measured at the net, and not at the racquet face, as is currently the standard practice. Gonzales was recorded as hitting the fastest serve, 112.88 mph, followed by Kramer at 107.8, and Van Horn at 104. Kovacs, who possessed a big serve, played in the Philadelphia tournament but did not participate in the service speed measurements. Segura and Riggs participated in the test, but their results were not reported.

Kramer did not play in the Cleveland International Pro (Cleveland U.S. Pro according to PTPA). At the USPLTA U.S. Pro at Forest Hills N.Y., in 1951, Kramer withdrew with back trouble after a five-set win over Parker. Kramer was not ranked in the USPLTA professional ranking due to insufficient U.S. tournament play (having withdrawn from the Forest Hills U.S. Pro and having been absent from the Cleveland U.S. Pro). Kramer was ranked U.S. no. 4 professional for 1951 behind Kovacs, Segura, and Gonzales by the PTPA. Some recent tennis writers have considered Kramer to be world no. 1 for the 1951 period. Kramer was described as "world champion" or "world's professional champion" throughout 1951.

1952

At the Philadelphia Masters Indoor, Kramer lost both of his matches to Gonzales, who won the tournament. At the Roland Garros Round Robin Professional event in Paris, Kramer defeated Gonzales but lost to Segura, who won the tournament. At the 1952 Wembley Professional Championships, Kramer lost a close five-set final to Gonzales, regarded as one of the classic all-time matches. Kramer was not ranked in the 1952 U.S. professional rankings by the USPLTA or the PTPA, both of which ranked Segura professional no. 1 followed by Gonzales at no. 2. Kramer did not play at the U. S. Pro (billed title Cleveland International Pro), which was won by Segura. Some recent tennis writers have considered Kramer to be world no. 1 for the 1952 period.

1953

Kramer beat Frank Sedgman, 54–41, in the 1953 World Series and was referred to as "world champion" again. Kramer did not play in any of the larger tournaments in 1953. Kramer was ranked no. 3 professional for 1953 by the Players' Committee of the Cleveland World Pro in June behind Gonzales and Segura. Kramer was given a world no. 1 professional tennis player reference by The Sacramento Bee newspaper for 1953. He was ranked world no. 1 pro by Frank Sedgman in October 1953. Kramer was ranked behind the World no. 1 ranked Sedgman in the 1953 Tennis de France full season rankings, which included the results from Europe, published by Philippe Chatrier. Some recent tennis writers have considered Kramer to be world no. 1 for the 1953 period. Kramer retired from competitive tennis in 1954 due to arthritic back problems and went on to promote his Pro Tour.

1954 & 1956

Kramer played matches during an Asia tour in September and October 1954 with Pancho Gonzales, Frank Sedgman and Pancho Segura. In 1956, Kramer played a few undercard matches against Segura on the main tour (Gonzales and Trabert were the feature match). Kramer also played a South American tour in late June and early July 1956 with Gonzales, Sedgman and Trabert. Kramer played in the Masters at Los Angeles in July–August 1956, losing all of his matches.

1957–1959

Kramer made a comeback on a four-man world tour with Hoad, Rosewall, Segura, and Sedgman in the fall of 1957. Kramer led Hoad for most of the tour, before being slightly edged by the new recruit 16 to 14. Hoad claimed that he had great trouble learning to read Kramer's service motion, which he found very deceptive.

Kramer beat Hoad at the Wembley tournament. "Kramer, as accurate as ever, seldom hit a loose shot and Hoad, closely confined by so much admirable lawn tennis, did not seem to have patience enough to fight his way out of his difficulties." Kramer lost his next match in the semifinals to Rosewall, but beat Gonzales in the third place match.

Gonzales and Hoad were the headliners for Kramer's upcoming world championship tour in 1958, in which Kramer substituted for some of the undercard matches in the New Zealand portion of the tour. Following his tour loss to Gonzales in 1957, Rosewall had requested to Kramer to be included in the 1958 championship tour, and Rosewall rejected Kramer's offer of an undercard position against Trabert. Kramer fared poorly against Rosewall in the 1957 series, and he lost again to Rosewall in the quarterfinals of the 1958 French Professional Championships. Trabert beat Kramer in the quarter-finals of the Wembley tournament in 1958. Kramer lost in the first round at the Wembley tournament in 1959 to Rosewall.

=== Assessment ===
Tall and slim, he was the first world-class player to play "the Big Game", a consistent serve-and-volley game, in which he came to the net behind all of his serves, including the second serve. He was particularly known for his powerful serve and forehand, as well as his ability to play "percentage tennis", which he learned from Cliff Roche, a retired automotive engineer, at the Los Angeles Tennis Club (LATC). This strategy maximized his efforts on certain points and in certain games during the course of a match to increase his chances of winning. The key was to hold serve at all costs, which was one of many things that made up Kramer's mature game.

Kramer was regarded by some tennis historians as one of the greatest players ever.

In 1975, Don Budge ranked his top five players of all time and rated Kramer number two behind Vines. He also said Kramer had the best forehand.

In 1978, Ellsworth Vines ranked his all-time top 10 in Tennis Myth and Method and rated Kramer number two, behind Budge.

In the Tennis Channel series "100 Greatest of All Time" in 2012, Kramer was ranked the 21st greatest male tennis player of all time, just ahead of longtime rival Pancho Gonzales at 22nd, and close behind his former pro recruit Lew Hoad at 19th.

In the early years of the 21st century, Sidney Wood compiled his list of the Greatest Players of All Time (later published posthumously in a memoir "The Wimbledon final that never was and other tennis tales from a bygone era"). Wood first entered Wimbledon in 1927 and won the title in 1931. "From that time on, through to the late 1970s (doubles only towards the end), I was privileged to compete against virtually every top player in the world" said Wood. Wood ranked Kramer number two, behind Budge.

In 2014, Frank Sedgman ranked Kramer number one in his greatest male tennis players of all-time list in his autobiography 'Game, Sedge and Match'.

=== Promoter ===
Kramer was involved in the 1948 agreement between the touring professionals and the USPLTA, which represented the teaching professionals and tennis professionals not under contract for the pro tours. The agreement established cooperation between the contract professionals and the USPLTA over the holding of the U.S. Pro at Forest Hills, and the touring pros agreed to become members of the USPLTA and to refrain from establishing a separate contract player's organization. The issue emerged again in 1951 when a group of touring pros established the Professional Tennis Players Association, which supported the Cleveland event as the U.S. Pro. The PTPA included the important pros who were no longer involved in the major professional tours, namely Kovacs, Segura, and Gonzales, and there was discussion of the PTPA creating an alternative pro tour. The PTPA apparently did not continue beyond 1952. Kramer remained on good terms with the USPLTA into the 1960s.

Kramer incorporated his company World Tennis Inc. Tours in 1952 to manage the major professional world tours. He signed Frank Sedgman and Ken McGregor to contracts for the 1953 world tour, which cemented Kramer's position as the foremost promoter in the professional game. He subsequently signed a succession of amateur players to professional contracts: Tony Trabert and Rex Hartwig in 1955, Ken Rosewall in 1956, Lew Hoad in 1957, Ashley Cooper, Mal Anderson and Mervyn Rose in 1958, Alex Olmedo in 1959, Mike Davies, Andrés Gimeno, Robert Haillet, Kurt Nielsen, Barry MacKay and Butch Buchholz in 1960 and Luis Ayala in 1961. Some of these amateurs were pitted against Pancho Gonzales in marathon head-to-head match series for the title of World Professional Champion, which were played primarily in the U.S.. Gonzales won a four-man tour over Segura and Sedgman in 1954, a world series marathon against Trabert in 1956, another long tour against Rosewall in 1957, and against Hoad in 1958.

In 1959 and 1960 Kramer arranged four-man tours for the World Championship title. Gonzales frequently complained about the financial arrangements which guaranteed much more money to the new pro recruits than to himself. However, Hoad stated "I never had a problem with Jack Kramer". It was said that Kramer never had a signed contract with Pancho Segura, but operated entirely on a handshake basis with the Ecuadorian star. During the heyday of the Kramer pro tours in the late 1950s, with 11 Hall of Fame tennis players under contract, Kramer's troupe of players were reported to be among the best paid athletes in the world of professional sports, comparable to the best paid baseball players. Laver later stated "He was a huge figure in tennis. We all needed money and he helped a lot of players get some."

During the years of Kramer's management, the major professional tours gradually transformed from the traditional two-man head-to-head marathon series to a more inclusive arrangement of tournaments linked by points systems which included all of the contract professionals. This transition was necessitated by the growing number of prominent players under contract to Kramer. In 1959, Kramer organized a year-long series of 15 tournaments in Australia, North America, and Europe linked by a points system to create a ranking of all the 12 professionals under contract to his World Tennis Inc. Tours, with a significant bonus money award to the number one finisher. Kramer also arranged a tournament points series for 1960, although both Gonzales and Hoad withdrew and there were no announced final results. In 1964, Kramer advised and helped arrange a five-month series of 17 tournaments in the United States and Europe with a points system to determine the rankings of the touring pros. These points series of tournaments paved the way for more recent and current professional rankings and tours.

Kramer had planned an important women's professional tour for 1955 between Maureen Connolly and defending world professional champion Pauline Betz, but it failed to materialize due to Connolly's career-ending injury. It was expected that Connolly would earn about $75,000 from her contract. Kramer apparently gave testimony at Connolly's trial for damages.

Kramer terminated his own company World Tennis Inc. Tours in early 1960, but remained as promoter and manager of the new International Professional Tennis Players Association, which was owned by the players themselves and assumed responsibility for the pro player contracts.

Ramanathan Krishnan rejected a record three-year $150,000 guarantee offer from Kramer in 1959. Neale Fraser rejected a $50,000 two-year contract from Kramer in 1960. Both Rod Laver and Roy Emerson rejected contract offers from Kramer in 1961, and Kramer was not able to field a world tour in 1962, retiring as promoter and manager that year, being succeeded by Tony Trabert. Kramer continued to assist in the pro tour occasionally thereafter, and helped to arrange an $80,000 offer to Emerson in 1964, which Emerson rejected.

Kramer was a relentless advocate for the establishment of Open Tennis between amateur and professional players. An International Tennis Federation (ITF) proposal to introduce Open tennis lost by five votes in 1960, but became a reality in 1968. In 1970, he created the Men's Grand Prix points system. In 1972, he was the first executive director of the ATP. He was unpaid at his request. In this role, he was a key figure in an ATP boycott of Wimbledon in 1973, for the banning of Nikola Pilić from the tournament.

=== Author ===
In his 1979 autobiography The Game: My 40 Years in Tennis, Kramer calls Helen Wills Moody the best women's tennis player that he ever saw. "She was the champion of the world, when I was 15 and played her. – she won Seven Forest Hills and Eight Wimbledons...I beat her, but Helen played a very good game."

Kramer ranked the best possessors of tennis shots as of 1979:

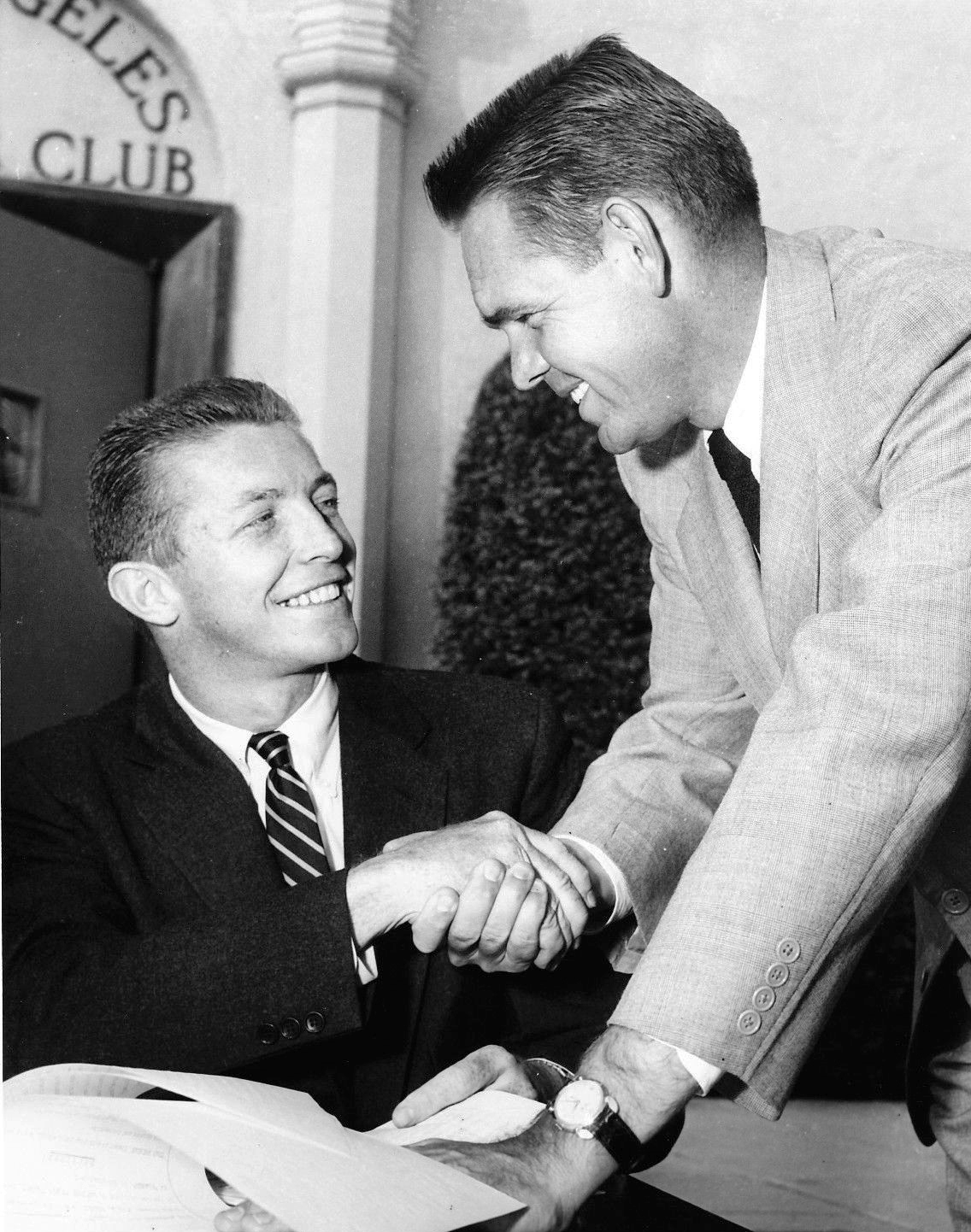
Tony Trabert and Jack Kramer in 1955

- First serve: Ellsworth Vines had the finest serve, but Pancho Gonzales was "more consistent with his in the tightest spots. Tilden, too, must be ranked, for speed and deception".
- Second serve: John Newcombe by far.
- Forehand: Pancho Segura was best, then Fred Perry, followed by Bill Tilden and Ellsworth Vines.
- Backhand: Donald Budge was the best, with Frank Kovacs, Ken Rosewall and Jimmy Connors in the next rank.
- Return of serve: Don Budge was the best, followed by Connors.
- Forehand volley: Wilmer Allison, followed by Budge Patty, then Newcombe.
- Backhand volley: Close among Frank Sedgman, Don Budge and Ken Rosewall, with Sedgman having the edge.
- Overhead: Ted Schroeder was the best, ahead of Vines, Rosewall and Newcombe.
- Lob: Bobby Riggs was the best, "but Segura, Bitsy Grant and Rosewall were almost as effective".
- Half volley: Pancho Gonzales and Ken Rosewall.

Kramer's serve and forehand were equal to the best players in the game, but he would not talk about his own strokes.

Kramer attended Rollins College in Winter Park, Florida, and he played on the tennis team in the 1941 and 1942 seasons. Pauline Betz was there at the same time.

=== Commentator ===
Kramer started working for the BBC as a commentator on the Wimbledon Championships in 1960, a role in which he was very popular because of his intimate off-court knowledge of most of the players. He was paired with Dan Maskell in the commentators booth. However, he was dropped by the BBC in 1973 because of his role in the ATP boycott of Wimbledon that year, which saw 81 players, including defending champion Stan Smith, stay away from the tournament. Kramer returned to the BBC to commentate on the 1976 Wimbledon championships and the 1996 Australian Open men's singles final. Kramer was the first host of BBC TV's Wimbledon evening highlights programme called Match of the Day from 1964 to 1970. He also commentated for NBC from 1954 to 1962, ABC from 1965 to 1973 and CBS from 1968 to 1973.

=== Thoroughbred racing ===
A fan of Thoroughbred racing, Kramer owned and raced a number of Thoroughbred horses.

== Early and personal life ==
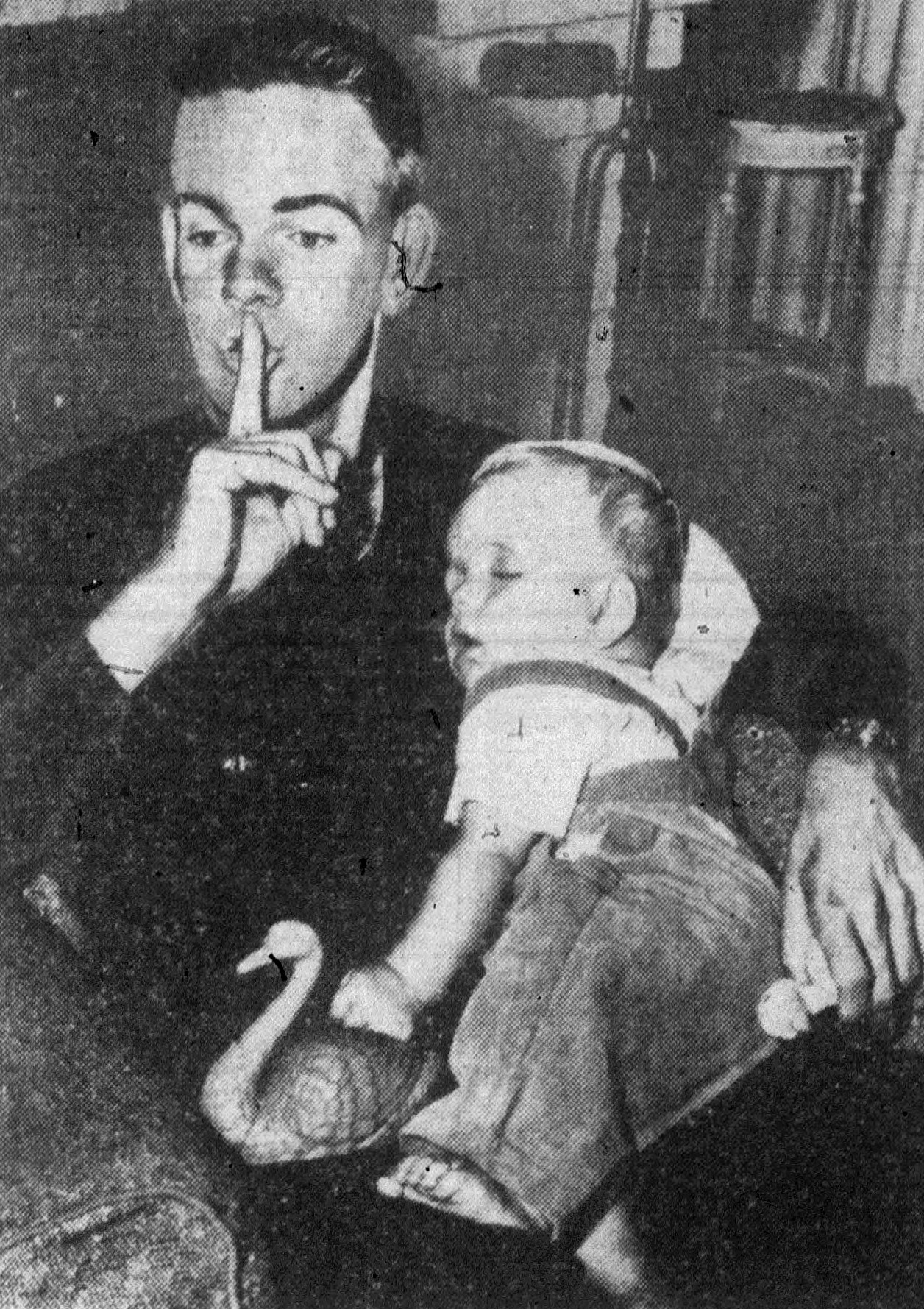
Kramer with his son David in 1947

Kramer was the son of a blue-collar railroad worker for the Union Pacific railroad. As a boy he was a fine all-round athlete, particularly in basketball and tennis. When he was 13, the family moved to San Bernardino, California, and after seeing Ellsworth Vines, then the world's best player, play a match, Kramer decided to concentrate on tennis.

In 1944, he married Gloria, and they had five sons: Bob, David, John, Michael and Ron. They lived in Bel Air, California. He invested in the Professional Tennis Tour, the Jack Kramer Tennis Club in Palos Verdes, California., two Golf courses at the Los Serranos Country Club in Chino Hills, California, and racehorses. Starting in 1948, the Jack Kramer Autograph tennis racket from Wilson Sporting Goods became the most popular selling racket of all time for over 35 years (Wilson Sporting Goods-1984).

== Death ==
Jack Kramer died from a soft tissue cancer on September 12, 2009, at his home in the Bel Air neighborhood of Los Angeles, California.

== Awards and honors ==
Kramer was inducted into the International Tennis Hall of Fame in Newport, Rhode Island in 1968. From 1979 until 1981 the Los Angeles Tennis Open, a tournament he was involved with since the 1950s, was known as the "Jack Kramer Open". He was portrayed by actor Bill Pullman in the 2017 movie Battle of the Sexes.

== Grand Slam finals ==
=== Singles (3 titles, 1 runner-up) ===
Result	Year	Championship	Surface	Opponent	Score
Loss	1943	U.S. Championships	Grass	(United States) Joe Hunt	3–6, 8–6, 8–10, 0–6
Win	1946	U.S. Championships (1)	Grass	(United States) Tom Brown	9–7, 6–3, 6–0
Win	1947	Wimbledon	Grass	(United States) Tom Brown	6–1, 6–3, 6–2
Win	1947	U.S. Championships (2)	Grass	(United States) Frank Parker	4–6, 2–6, 6–1, 6–0, 6–3

=== Doubles (6 titles) ===
Result	Year	Championship	Surface	Partner	Opponents	Score
Win	1940	U.S. Championships	Grass	(United States) Ted Schroeder	(United States) Gardnar Mulloy (United States) Henry Prusoff	6–4, 8–6, 9–7
Win	1941	U.S. Championships	Grass	(United States) Ted Schroeder	(United States) Wayne Sabin (United States) Gardnar Mulloy	9–7, 6–4, 6–2
Win	1943	U.S. Championships	Grass	(United States) Frank Parker	(United States) Bill Talbert (United States) David Freeman	6–2, 6–4, 6–4
Win	1946	Wimbledon	Grass	(United States) Tom Brown	(Australia) Geoff Brown (Australia) Dinny Pails	6–4, 6–4, 6–2
Win	1947	Wimbledon	Grass	(United States) Bob Falkenburg	(United Kingdom) Tony Mottram (Australia) Bill Sidwell	8–6, 6–3, 6–3
Win	1947	U.S. Championships	Grass	(United States) Ted Schroeder	(United States) Bill Talbert (Australia) Bill Sidwell	6–4, 7–5, 6–3

== Pro Slam finals ==
=== Singles (2 titles, 1 runner-up) ===
Result	Year	Championship	Surface	Opponent	Score
Win	1948	US Pro	Grass	(United States) Bobby Riggs	14–12, 6–2, 3–6, 6–3
Win	1949	Wembley Pro	Indoor	(United States) Bobby Riggs	2–6, 6–4, 6–3, 6–4
Loss	1952	Wembley Pro	Indoor	(United States) Pancho Gonzales	6–3, 6–3, 2–6, 4–6, 5–7

== Sources ==
- Tennis is my Racket (1949), Bobby Riggs
- Man with a Racket (1959), Pancho Gonzales
- Big Bill Tilden, The Triumph and the Tragedy (1979), Frank Deford
- Tennis Players are Made, not Born (1976), Dick Skeen
- Little Pancho (2009), Caroline Seebohm
- The Factory System (August 1950), Perry T. Jones in Life Magazine
- Mental Tennis (1994), Vic Braden
- As It Was (2009), Gardnar Mulloy
- Never Make the First Offer (2009), Donald Dell
- Underwood, Peter (2019). The Pros: The Forgotten Era of Tennis. New Chapter Press. ISBN 978-1937559915.
