= 1946 French Championships – Men's singles =

Tennis tournament

Men's singles
- 1946 French Championships

Final
- Champion: (France) Marcel Bernard
- Runner-up: (Czechoslovakia) Jaroslav Drobný
- Score: 3–6, 2–6, 6–1, 6–4, 6–3

Details
- Seeds: 16

Events
Singles	men	women
Doubles	men	women
← 1939 ·	French Championships	· 1947 →

Marcel Bernard defeated Jaroslav Drobný 3–6, 2–6, 6–1, 6–4, 6–3 to win the men's singles tennis title at the 1946 French Championships.

== Seeds ==
1. (France) Yvon Petra (semifinals)
2. (United States) Tom Brown (semifinals)
3. (Czechoslovakia) Jaroslav Drobný (final)
4. (Ecuador) Pancho Segura (third round)
5. (Czechoslovakia) Ján Smolinský (first round)
6. (France) Bernard Destremau (third round)
7. (France) Pierre Pellizza (quarterfinals)
8. (Czechoslovakia) Ferdinand Vrba (quarterfinals)
9. (United Kingdom) Eric Filby (first round)
10. (Argentina) Enrique Morea (first round)
11. (Socialist Federal Republic of Yugoslavia) Dragutin Mitić (quarterfinals)
12. (United States) Budge Patty (quarterfinals)
13. (France) Marcel Bernard (champion)
14. (United States) John Burke Wilkinson (first round)
15. (United Kingdom) Anthony John Mottram (second round)
16. (Socialist Federal Republic of Yugoslavia) Josip Palada (first round)

== Draw ==
1946 French Championships draw.

Quarterfinals
2	(United States) Tom Brown	6	6	6
7	(France) Pierre Pellizza	2	2	3
3	(Czechoslovakia) Jaroslav Drobný	6	7	6	8
11	(Socialist Federal Republic of Yugoslavia) Dragutin Mitić	2	5	8	6
12	(United States) Budge Patty	6	2	1	6	5
13	(France) Marcel Bernard	2	6	6	4	7
8	(Czechoslovakia) Ferdinand Vrba	6	0	4	2
1	(France) Yvon Petra	2	6	6	6

Semifinals
2	(United States) Tom Brown	5	6	4	7	2
3	(Czechoslovakia) Jaroslav Drobný	7	3	6	5	6
13	(France) Marcel Bernard	5	6	6	5	6
1	(France) Yvon Petra	7	2	3	7	2

Final
3	(Czechoslovakia) Jaroslav Drobný	6	6	1	4	3
13	(France) Marcel Bernard	3	2	6	6	6

=== Earlier rounds ===
==== Section 1 ====
First round
2	(United States) Brown	8	6	7
(France) Lips	6	2	5
(Czechoslovakia) Vodicka	6	3	6	7
(United States) Webster	3	6	2	5
15	(United Kingdom) Mottram	6	6	6
(France) Schaff	1	0	4
(France) Dubuc	5	5	6	7	6
(Egypt) Najar	7	7	1	5	1
7	(France) Pellizza	6	6	6
(France) Poulalion	2	2	3
(France) Journu	6	6	6	6
(France) Grandet	3	8	3	3
10	(Argentina) Morea	3	6	8	6	5
(France) Boussus	6	4	10	2	7
(France) Bolelli	6	6	6
(Monaco) Medecin	4	0	3

Second round
2	(United States) Brown	6	6	8
(Czechoslovakia) Vodicka	2	3	6
15	(United Kingdom) Mottram	2	2	6	4
(France) Dubuc	6	6	4	6
7	(France) Pellizza	6	6	7
(France) Journu	1	0	5
(France) Boussus	4	8	6	6
(France) Bolelli	6	6	3	0

Third round
2	(United States) Brown	6	8	6
(France) Dubuc	4	6	2
7	(France) Pellizza	6	6	6	6
(France) Boussus	2	8	4	2

Quarterfinals
2	(United States) Brown	6	6	6
7	(France) Pellizza	2	2	3

==== Section 2 ====
First round
3	(Czechoslovakia) Drobný	6	6	6
(France) Laval	1	0	1
(Chile) Hammersley	6	6	6
(France) Jalabert	1	3	2
14	(United States) Wilkinson	3	1	2
(France) Delhomme	6	6	6
(France) Sanglier	0	2	6	6	6
(United Kingdom) Barton	6	6	0	2	1
6	(France) Destremau	6	6	6
(United States) Anderson	1	1	1
(France) Favières	6	5	6	6
(France) Tiberghien	1	7	2	4
11	(Socialist Federal Republic of Yugoslavia) Mitić	6	6	6
(France) Gremillet	1	2	1
(France) Abdesselam	6	6	5	6
(France) Lucot	4	1	7	2

Second round
3	(Czechoslovakia) Drobný	6	6	6
(Chile) Hammersley	4	2	3
(France) Delhomme	4	6	1	7	4
(France) Sanglier	6	1	6	5	6
6	(France) Destremau	6	6	6
(France) Favières	3	4	3
11	(Socialist Federal Republic of Yugoslavia) Mitić	6	2	3	4
(France) Abdesselam	3	6	6	6

Third round
3	(Czechoslovakia) Drobný	6	6	6
(France) Sanglier	1	2	1
6	(France) Destremau	10	3	7	4
11	(Socialist Federal Republic of Yugoslavia) Mitić	12	6	5	6

Quarterfinals
3	(Czechoslovakia) Drobný	6	7	6	8
11	(Socialist Federal Republic of Yugoslavia) Mitić	2	5	8	6

==== Section 3 ====
First round
(France) Thomas
(Socialist Federal Republic of Yugoslavia) Punčec	w/	o
12	(United States) Patty	6	6	6
(France) Dessair	4	4	4
(France) Rémy	2	8	6	6
(France) Colin	6	6	3	1
5	(Czechoslovakia) Smolinsky	2	3	8	3
(France) Feret	6	6	6	6
(Czechoslovakia) Caska
(United States) Robertson	w/	o
13	(France) Bernard	6	6	5	6
(France) Buse	3	4	7	4
(Luxembourg) Wampach	4	6	6	6
(United Kingdom) Billington	6	3	3	4
4	(Ecuador) Segura	6	6	6
(United Kingdom) Paish	2	2	0

Second round
(France) Thomas	4	4	4
12	(United States) Patty	6	6	6
(France) Rémy	8	4	2	3
(France) Feret	6	6	6	6
(Czechoslovakia) Caska	4	3	7	6
13	(France) Bernard	6	6	5	8
(Luxembourg) Wampach	2	0	4
4	(Ecuador) Segura	6	6	6

Third round
12	(United States) Patty	6	2	6	3	6
(France) Feret	2	6	1	6	4
13	(France) Bernard	8	6	6
4	(Ecuador) Segura	6	3	1

Quarterfinals
12	(United States) Patty	6	2	1	6	5
13	(France) Bernard	2	6	6	4	7

==== Section 4 ====
First round
(France) Berthet	6	6	5	6
(France) Gentien	3	3	7	4
9	(United Kingdom) Filby	5	4	4
(France) Jaquemet	7	6	6
(Egypt) Shafei	6	6	6
(United States) Drobac	2	1	0
8	(Czechoslovakia) Vrba	10
(France) Lesueur	8	rtd.
(France) Jamain	6	6	6
(France) Boulle	3	1	4
16	(Socialist Federal Republic of Yugoslavia) Palada	w/	o
(France) Malosse
(France) Pellizza	6	6	6
(Monaco) Gallepe	3	2	4
1	(France) Petra	6	6	6
(France) Billaudot	2	3	2

Second round
(France) Berthet	1	3	6	6	7
(France) Jaquemet	6	6	2	4	5
(Egypt) Shafei	4	5	10
8	(Czechoslovakia) Vrba	6	7	12
(France) Jamain	11	5	1	4
(France) Malosse	9	7	6	6
(France) Pellizza	2	1	2
1	(France) Petra	6	6	6

Third round
(France) Berthet	3	3	3
8	(Czechoslovakia) Vrba	6	6	6
(France) Jamain	1	2	3
1	(France) Petra	6	6	6

Quarterfinals
8	(Czechoslovakia) Vrba	6	0	4	2
1	(France) Petra	2	6	6	6

Preceded by 1946 Wimbledon Championships – Men's singles	Grand Slam men's singles	Succeeded by 1946 U.S. National Championships – Men's singles
