= Marcel Bernard =

French tennis player (1914–1994)

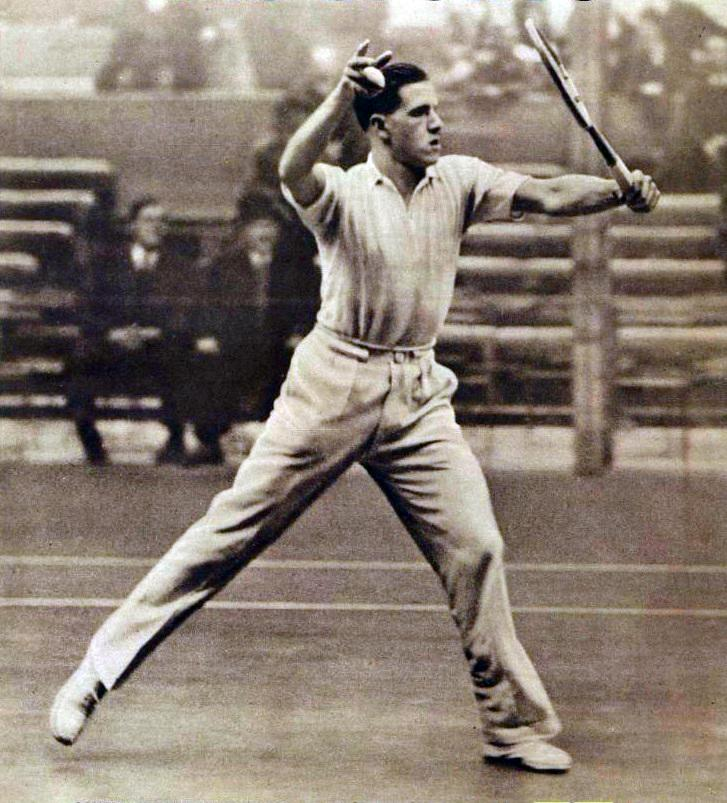
- Bernard in 1934
- Country (sports): France
- Born: 18 May 1914 La Madeleine, Nord, France
- Died: 29 April 1994 (aged 79) Paris, France
- Turned pro: 1930 (amateur tour)
- Retired: 1956
- Plays: Left-handed (one-handed backhand)

Singles
- Highest ranking: No. 5 (1946, A. Wallis Myers)

Grand Slam singles results
- French Open: W (1946)
- Wimbledon: 3R (1934, 1937)
- US Open: 3R (1932)

Doubles

Grand Slam doubles results
- French Open: W (1936, 1946)
- Wimbledon: QF (1935)

Mixed doubles

Grand Slam mixed doubles results
- French Open: W (1935, 1936)
- Wimbledon: 4R (1937)

Marcel Bernard (French pronunciation: [maʁsɛl bɛʁnaʁ]; 18 May 1914 – 29 April 1994) was a French tennis player. He is best remembered for having won the French Championships in 1946 (reaching the semifinals a further three times). Bernard initially intended to play only in the doubles event but was persuaded to enter the singles competition as well. He defeated Jaroslav Drobný in the final in five sets.

In the same 1946 French Championships Bernard also won the Men's Doubles with Yvon Petra. In the 1935 French Open, he won the Mixed Doubles with Lolette Payot. In the following French Open (1936), he also won the Mixed Doubles with Billie Yorke and the Men's Doubles with Jean Borotra. Bernard's Grand Slam singles career spanned 25 years from 1931 to 1956. He played Davis Cup for France over a period spanning 21 years, from 1935 to 1956. Bernard was ranked world No. 5 for 1946 by A. Wallis Myers and world No. 9 for 1947 by Harry Hopman.

Bernard became president of the national French tennis association, Fédération Française de Tennis (FFT), in 1968 and held the position until 1973. The trophy for the winners of the mixed doubles competition at the French Open is now known as the "Coupe Marcel Bernard". His name is also commemorated at the Roland-Garros Stadium by the walkway "Allée Marcel Bernard" which leads to the Suzanne Lenglen Court.

== Grand Slam finals ==
=== Singles : 1 title ===
Result	Year	Championship	Surface	Opponent	Score
Win	1946	French Championships	Clay	(Czechoslovakia) Jaroslav Drobný	3–6, 2–6, 6–1, 6–4, 6–3

=== Doubles : 2 titles, 1 runner-up ===
Result	Year	Championship	Surface	Partner	Opponents	Score
Loss	1932	French Championships	Clay	(France) Christian Boussus	(France) Jacques Brugnon (France) Henri Cochet	4–6, 6–3, 5–7, 3–6
Win	1936	French Championships	Clay	(France) Jean Borotra	(United Kingdom) Pat Hughes (United Kingdom) Charles Tuckey	6–2, 3–6, 9–7, 6–1
Win	1946	French Championships	Clay	(France) Yvon Petra	(Argentina) Enrique Morea (United States) Pancho Segura	7–5, 6–3, 0–6, 1–6, 10–8

=== Mixed doubles : 2 titles ===
Result	Year	Championship	Surface	Partner	Opponents	Score
Win	1935	French Championships	Clay	(France) Lolette Payot	(France) Sylvie Jung Henrotin (France) André Martin-Legeay	4–6, 6–2, 6–4
Win	1936	French Championships	Clay	(United Kingdom) Billie Yorke	(France) Sylvie Jung Henrotin (France) André Martin-Legeay	7–5, 6–8, 6–3
