= 1946 French Championships – Women's singles =

Women's singles
- 1946 French Championships

Final
- Champion: (United States) Margaret Osborne
- Runner-up: (United States) Pauline Betz
- Score: 1–6, 8–6, 7–5

Details
- Draw: 39
- Seeds: 16

Events
Singles	men	women
Doubles	men	women
← 1939 ·	French Championships	· 1947 →

Second-seeded Margaret Osborne defeated first-seeded Pauline Betz 1–6, 8–6, 7–5 in the final to win the women's singles tennis title at the 1946 French Championships.

== Seeds ==
The seeded players are listed below. Margaret Osborne is the champion; others show the round in which they were eliminated.

1. (United States) Pauline Betz (finalist)
2. (United States) Margaret Osborne (champion)
3. (United States) Louise Brough (semifinals)
4. (United States) Patricia Todd (third round)
5. (France) Monique Hamelin (third round)
6. (United Kingdom) Billie Yorke (first round)
7. (Luxembourg) Alice Weiwers (quarterfinals)
8. (France) Ginette Jucker (third round)
9. (United Kingdom) Betty Hilton (quarterfinals)
10. (France) Micheline Inglebert (third round)
11. (United States) Doris Hart (quarterfinals)
12. (United States) Dorothy Bundy (semifinals)
13. (France) Nelly Landry (quarterfinals)
14. (France) Simone Lafargue (third round)
15. (Poland) Jadwiga Jędrzejowska (third round)
16. (Czechoslovakia) Helena Straubeová (third round)

== Draw ==
=== Key ===
- Q = Qualifier
- WC = Wild card
- LL = Lucky loser
- r = Retired

=== Finals ===
Quarterfinals
1	(United States) Pauline Betz	6	6
9	(United Kingdom) Betty Hilton	1	0
13	(France) Nelly Landry	4	7	4
12	(United States) Dorothy Bundy	6	5	6
11	(United States) Doris Hart	4	6	1
3	(United States) Louise Brough	6	4	6
7	(Luxembourg) Alice Weiwers	3	2
2	(United States) Margaret Osborne	6	6

Semifinals
1	(United States) Pauline Betz	6	6
12	(United States) Dorothy Bundy	3	4
3	(United States) Louise Brough	5	3
2	(United States) Margaret Osborne	7	6

Finals
1	(United States) Pauline Betz	6	6	5
2	(United States) Margaret Osborne	1	8	7

=== Earlier rounds ===
==== Section 1 ====
First round

Second round
1	(United States) Betz	6	6
(France) Brunnarius	1	2
16	(Czechoslovakia) Straubeová	6	4	6
(France) Amouretti	2	6	4
8	(France) Jucker	8	6
(France) Pannetier	6	4
9	(United Kingdom) Hilton	6	6
(France) Saint Omer Roy	1	0

Third round
1	(United States) Betz	6	6
16	(Czechoslovakia) Straubeová	1	2
8	(France) Jucker	1	2
9	(United Kingdom) Hilton	6	6

Quarterfinals
1	(United States) Betz	6	6
9	(United Kingdom) Hilton	1	0

==== Section 2 ====
First round
(United States) Belin	0	0
(France) Boegner	6	6
(France) Levy	0	0
12	(United States) Bundy	6	6
(France) Charpenel	4	4
(United Kingdom) Quertier	6	6

Second round
4	(United States) Todd	6	6
(France) Foy	1	0
(France) Morel-Deville	0	3
13	(France) Landry	6	6
5	(France) Hamelin	6	7
(France) Boegner	2	5
12	(United States) Bundy	6	6
(United Kingdom) Quertier	3	1

Third round
4	(United States) Todd	2	3
13	(France) Landry	6	6
5	(France) Hamelin	7	1
12	(United States) Bundy	9	6

Quarterfinals
13	(France) Landry	6	5	6
12	(United States) Bundy	4	7	4

==== Section 3 ====
First round
(United Kingdom) Curry	6	6
(France) Claude	2	3
(France) Fritz	6	6
(France) Jamain	4	1
11	(United States) Hart
(France) Wyns-Speranza
(France) Patorni
6	(United Kingdom) Yorke

Second round
(United Kingdom) Curry	6	6
(France) Fritz	3	0
11	(United States) Hart	8	6
(France) Patorni	6	1
14	(France) Lafargue	6	6
(France) Kleinadel	2	1
(France) Savoye	1	0
3	(United States) Brough	6	6

Third round
(United Kingdom) Curry	4	4
11	(United States) Hart	6	6
14	(France) Lafargue	3	6	3
3	(United States) Brough	6	3	6

Quarterfinals
11	(United States) Hart	6	4	6
3	(United States) Brough	4	6	1

==== Section 4 ====
First round

Second round
(United Kingdom) Thomas	4	3
10	(France) Inglebert	6	6
(France) Marcellin	3	4
7	(Luxembourg) Weiwers	6	6
(France) Ravoux	6	3
15	(Poland) Jędrzejowska	8	6
(France) Saladin	0	2
2	(United States) Margaret Osborne	6	6

Third round
10	(France) Inglebert	5	1
7	(Luxembourg) Weiwers	7	6
15	(Poland) Jędrzejowska	4	6
2	(United States) Margaret Osborne	6	8

Quarterfinals
7	(Luxembourg) Weiwers	3	2
2	(United States) Osborne	6	6

Preceded by 1946 Australian Championships – Women's singles	Grand Slam women's singles	Succeeded by 1946 Wimbledon Championships – Women's singles
