= 1946 U.S. National Championships – Women's singles =

Women's singles
- 1946 U.S. National Championships

Final
- Champion: (United States) Pauline Betz
- Runner-up: (United States) Doris Hart
- Score: 11–9, 6–3

Events
Singles	men	women
Doubles	men	women
← 1945 ·	U.S. National Championships	· 1947 →

First-seeded Pauline Betz defeated fifth-seeded Doris Hart 11–9, 6–3 in the final to win the women's singles tennis title at the 1946 U.S. National Championships.

== Seeds ==
The tournament used two lists of players for seeding the women's singles event; one for U.S. players and one for foreign players. Pauline Betz is the champion; others show in brackets the round in which they were eliminated.

1. (United States) Pauline Betz (champion)
2. (United States) Margaret Osborne (quarterfinals)
3. (United States) Louise Brough (quarterfinals)
4. (United States) Dorothy Bundy (first round)
5. (United States) Doris Hart (finalist)
6. (United States) Patricia Todd (semifinals)
7. (United States) Shirley Fry (first round)
8. (United States) Mary Arnold (semifinals)
9. (United Kingdom) Jean Bostock (third round)
10. (United Kingdom) Kay Stammers Menzies (third round)
11. (France) Raymonde Jones (first round)
12. (Canada) Mrs. Pat Adams (first round)
13. (India) Tara Deodhar (first round)

== Draw ==
=== Final eight ===
Quarterfinals
1	(United States) Pauline Betz	6	3	6
(United States) Gussie Moran	1	6	2
6	(United States) Patricia Todd	6	6
3	(United States) Louise Brough	2	2
8	(United States) Mary Arnold	6	6
(United States) Dorothy Head	2	1
5	(United States) Doris Hart	6	5	7
2	(United States) Margaret Osborne	4	7	5

Semifinals
1	(United States) Pauline Betz	6	6
6	(United States) Patricia Todd	2	3
8	(United States) Mary Arnold	3	2
5	(United States) Doris Hart	6	6

Finals
1	(United States) Pauline Betz	11	6
5	(United States) Doris Hart	9	3

Preceded by 1946 Wimbledon Championships – Women's singles	Grand Slam women's singles	Succeeded by 1947 Australian Championships – Women's singles
