= Yvon Petra =

French tennis player

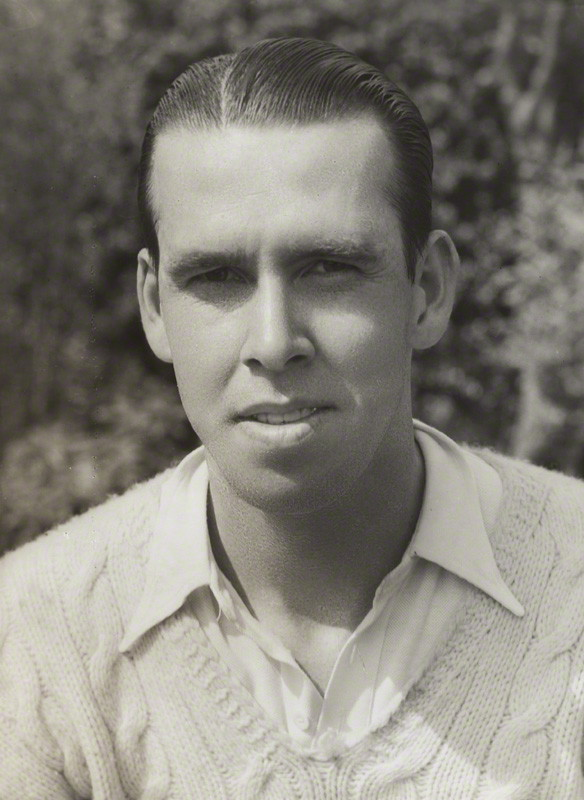
- Full name: Yvon François Marie Petra
- Country (sports): France
- Born: 8 March 1916 Cholon, French Indochina
- Died: 12 September 1984 (aged 68) Saint-Germain-en-Laye, France
- Height: 1.96 m (6 ft 5 in)
- Turned pro: 1948 (amateur from 1935)
- Retired: 1955
- Plays: Right-handed (one-handed backhand)
- Int. Tennis HoF: 2016 (member page)

Singles
- Career record: 179-65 (73.3%)
- Career titles: 18
- Highest ranking: No. 4 (1946, A. Wallis Myers)

Grand Slam singles results
- French Open: SF (1946)
- Wimbledon: W (1946)
- US Open: 4R (1936, 1937, 1938)

Other tournaments
- Professional majors
- US Pro: 1R (1950)

Doubles
- Career record: 0–1

Grand Slam doubles results
- French Open: W (1938, 1946)
- Wimbledon: QF (1947)

Grand Slam mixed doubles results
- French Open: W (1937)
- Wimbledon: F (1937)
- US Open: F (1937)

Yvon Petra (French pronunciation: [ivɔ̃ petʁa]; 8 March 1916 – 12 September 1984) was a French male tennis player. He was born in Cholon, French Indochina.

Petra is best remembered as the last Frenchman to win the Wimbledon Championships men's singles title (in 1946), beating Geoff Brown in five sets in the final. In doubles, he won the French Championships twice, in 1938 with Bernard Destremau, defeating the best pair in the world Budge-Mako, and in 1946 with Marcel Bernard. In 1938, he won the singles and doubles title at the French Covered Court Championships. He was a prisoner of war in World War II and after his release won three Tournoi de France singles titles from 1943 through 1945. He emigrated to the United States and worked as a tennis pro at the Saddle and Cycle Club in Chicago and a country club in Connecticut towards the end of his life. Petra was ranked world No. 4 for 1946 by A. Wallis Myers and world No. 8 for 1947 by Harry Hopman. He was the last man to wear long trousers in a Wimbledon final and was the last Frenchman to win the singles title.

Petra joined the tour of professional players in 1948. He was inducted into International Tennis Hall of Fame in 2016.

== Grand Slam finals ==
=== Singles: 1 (1 title) ===
Result	Year	Championship	Surface	Opponent	Score
Win	1946	Wimbledon	Grass	(Australia) Geoff Brown	6–2, 6–4, 7–9, 5–7, 6–2

=== Doubles: 2 (2 titles) ===
Result	Year	Championship	Surface	Partner	Opponents	Score
Win	1938	French Championships	Clay	(France) Bernard Destremau	(United States) Don Budge (United States) Gene Mako	3–6, 6–3, 9–7, 6–1
Win	1946	French Championships	Clay	(France) Marcel Bernard	(Argentina) Enrique Morea (United States) Pancho Segura	7–5, 6–3, 0–6, 1–6, 10–8

=== Mixed doubles: 3 (1 title, 2 runner-ups) ===
Result	Year	Championship	Surface	Partner	Opponents	Score
Win	1937	French Championships	Clay	(France) Simonne Mathieu	(Germany) Marie-Louise Horn (France) Roland Journu	7–5, 7–5
Loss	1937	Wimbledon	Grass	(France) Simonne Mathieu	(United States) Alice Marble (United States) Don Budge	4–6, 1–6
Loss	1937	U.S. Championships	Grass	(France) Sylvie Jung Henrotin	(United States) Sarah Palfrey (United States) Don Budge	2–6, 10–8, 0–6
