= Pauline Betz =

American tennis player (1919–2011)

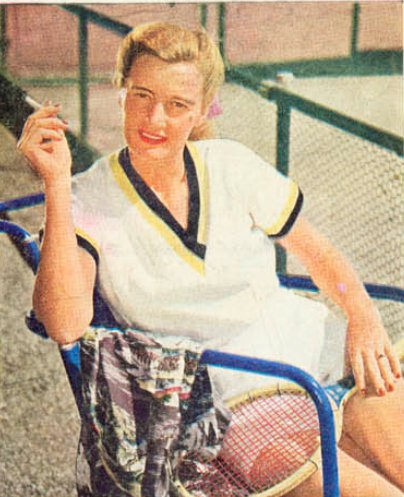
- Betz in 1949
- Full name: Pauline Betz Addie
- ITF name: Pauline Addie
- Country (sports): United States
- Born: Pauline May Betz; August 6, 1919 Dayton, Ohio, U.S.
- Died: May 31, 2011 (aged 91) Potomac, Maryland, U.S.
- Height: 5 ft 5 in (1.66 m)
- Turned pro: 1947
- Retired: 1960
- Int. Tennis HoF: 1965 (member page)

Singles
- Career record: 0–0
- Highest ranking: No. 1 (1946)

Grand Slam singles results
- French Open: F (1946)
- Wimbledon: W (1946)
- US Open: W (1942, 1943, 1944, 1946)

Doubles
- Career record: 0–0

Grand Slam doubles results
- French Open: F (1946)
- Wimbledon: F (1946)
- US Open: F (1941, 1942, 1943, 1944, 1945)

Grand Slam mixed doubles results
- French Open: W (1946)
- US Open: F (1941, 1943)

Team competitions
- Wightman Cup: W (1946)

Pauline May Betz Addie (née Betz, August 6, 1919 – May 31, 2011) was an American professional tennis player. She won five Grand Slam singles titles and was the runner-up on three other occasions. Jack Kramer called her the second best female tennis player he ever saw, behind Helen Wills Moody.

== Early life ==
Betz attended Los Angeles High School and learned her tennis from Dick Skeen. She continued her tennis and education at Rollins College (graduating in 1943), where she was a member of Kappa Alpha Theta sorority. Betz earned an MA in economics from Columbia University.

== Career ==
=== Amateur ===
Betz won the Eastern Clay Court Championships in 1941 and also won the Eastern Grass Court Championships that same year with a close win in the final against Sarah Palfrey Cooke. She won the Dixie International Championships three times (1940–1942).

Betz won the first of her four singles titles at the U.S. Championships in 1942, saving a match point in the semifinals against Margaret Osborne while trailing 3–5 in the final set. She defeated Louise Brough in a close final in both 1942 and 1943.

In 1943, she won the Tri-State tournament in Cincinnati, Ohio, defeating Catherine Wolf in the final without losing a point in the first set, a "golden set". In 1944, she won the final of the U.S. Championships against Margaret Osborne duPont.

She won the Wimbledon singles title in 1946, defeating Louise Brough in the final, the only time she entered the tournament, without losing a set. At the 1946 French Championships, held that year after Wimbledon, she lost the final in three sets to Margaret Osborne after failing to convert two match points. At the U.S. Championships in 1946, she defeated Patricia Canning Todd in the semifinal and Doris Hart in the final.

According to John Olliff, Betz was ranked world no. 1 in 1946 (no rankings issued from 1940 through 1945). She was included in the year-end top 10 rankings issued by the United States Lawn Tennis Association from 1939 through 1946. She was the top ranked U.S. player from 1942 through 1944 and in 1946.

=== Professional ===
Her amateur career ended in 1947 when the USLTA revoked her amateur status for exploring the possibilities of turning professional. Betz played two professional tours of matches against Sarah Palfrey Cooke (1947) and Gussie Moran (1951). A professional tour against Maureen Connolly was planned for 1955, but did not materialize due to Connolly's career-ending injury.

Pauline Betz won the Cleveland Women's World Professional Championships in 1953, 1955, and 1956, defeating Doris Hart, the reigning U.S. champion, in the 1956 final. In May 1956, she also played another match against Hart at Milwaukee, winning in two straight sets.

== Death ==
Betz died of complications related to Parkinson's disease on May 31, 2011. She is buried with her husband Bob Addie in a double plot in St Gabriel Cemetery in Potomac, Maryland.

== Awards and honors ==
On September 2, 1946, Betz appeared on the cover of TIME magazine. Betz was inducted into the International Tennis Hall of Fame in 1965. In 1995, she was inducted in the ITA Women's Collegiate Tennis Hall of Fame. The Pauline Betz Addie Tennis Center at Cabin John Regional Park in Potomac, Maryland, was renamed in her honor on May 1, 2008. Addie, Albert Ritzenberg, and Stanly Hoffberger founded the center in 1972.

== Grand Slam finals ==
=== Singles (5 titles, 3 runners-up) ===
Result	Year	Championship	Surface	Opponent	Score
Loss	1941	U.S. Championships	Grass	(United States) Sarah Palfrey Cooke	5–7, 2–6
Win	1942	U.S. Championships	Grass	(United States) Louise Brough	4–6, 6–1, 6–4
Win	1943	U.S. Championships (2)	Grass	(United States) Louise Brough	6–3, 5–7, 6–3
Win	1944	U.S. Championships (3)	Grass	(United States) Margaret Osborne	6–3, 8–6
Loss	1945	U.S. Championships	Grass	(United States) Sarah Palfrey Cooke	6–3, 6–8, 4–6
Win	1946	Wimbledon	Grass	(United States) Louise Brough	6–2, 6–4
Loss	1946	French Championships	Clay	(United States) Margaret Osborne	6–2, 6–8, 5–7
Win	1946	U.S. Championships (4)	Grass	(United States) Doris Hart	11–9, 6–3

=== Doubles: 7 (7 runner-ups) ===
Result	Year	Championship	Surface	Partner	Opponents	Score
Loss	1941	U.S. Championships	Grass	(United States) Dorothy Bundy	(United States) Sarah Palfrey (United States) Margaret Osborne	6–3, 1–6, 4–6
Loss	1942	U.S. Championships	Grass	(United States) Doris Hart	(United States) Louise Brough (United States) Margaret Osborne	6–2, 5–7, 0–6
Loss	1943	U.S. Championships	Grass	(United States) Doris Hart	(United States) Louise Brough (United States) Margaret Osborne	4–6, 3–6
Loss	1944	U.S. Championships	Grass	(United States) Doris Hart	(United States) Louise Brough (United States) Margaret Osborne	6–4, 4–6, 3–6
Loss	1945	U.S. Championships	Grass	(United States) Doris Hart	(United States) Louise Brough (United States) Margaret Osborne	3–6, 3–6
Loss	1946	Wimbledon	Grass	(United States) Doris Hart	(United States) Louise Brough (United States) Margaret Osborne	3–6, 6–2, 3–6
Loss	1946	French Championships	Clay	(United States) Doris Hart	(United States) Louise Brough (United States) Margaret Osborne	4–6, 6–0, 1–6

=== Mixed Doubles: 3 (1 title, 2 runner-ups) ===
Result	Year	Championship	Surface	Partner	Opponents	Score
Loss	1941	U.S. Championships	Grass	(United States) Bobby Riggs	(United States) Sarah Palfrey (United States) Jack Kramer	6–4, 4–6, 4–6
Loss	1943	U.S. Championships	Grass	(United States) Pancho Segura	(United States) Margaret Osborne (United States) Bill Talbert	8–10, 4–6
Win	1946	French Championships	Clay	(United States) Budge Patty	(United States) Dorothy Bundy (United States) Tom Brown	7–5, 9–7

== Grand Slam singles tournament timeline ==
Key
W	F	SF	QF	#R	RR	Q#	DNQ	A	NH

(W) winner; (F) finalist; (SF) semifinalist; (QF) quarterfinalist; (#R) rounds 4, 3, 2, 1; (RR) round-robin stage; (Q#) qualification round; (DNQ) did not qualify; (A) absent; (NH) not held; (SR) strike rate (events won / competed); (W–L) win–loss record.

Tournament	1939	1940	1941	1942	1943	1944	1945	1946^{1}	Career SR
Australian Championships	A	A	NH	NH	NH	NH	NH	A	0 / 0
French Championships	A	NH	R	R	R	R	A	F	0 / 1
Wimbledon	A	NH	NH	NH	NH	NH	NH	W	1 / 1
U.S. Championships	1R	QF	F	W	W	W	F	W	4 / 8
SR	0 / 1	0 / 1	0 / 1	1 / 1	1 / 1	1 / 1	0 / 1	2 / 3	5 / 10

R = tournament restricted to French nationals and held under German occupation.

^{1}In 1946, the French Championships were held after Wimbledon.

== Personal life ==
In 1949, Betz published an autobiography titled Wings on my Tennis Shoes. That same year she married Bob Addie, born Addonizio, a sportswriter for the Washington Times-Herald and Washington Post. The couple had five children, including poet and novelist Kim Addonizio, Rusty, Gary, Jon and Rick. Her granddaughter Aya Cash is an actress. Betz died in her sleep on May 31, 2011, aged 91.

== Records ==
Tournament	Year	Record accomplished	Player tied
Tri-State tournament	1943	Achieved a Golden Set	Tine Scheuer-Larsen (1995) Yaroslava Shvedova (2012)

== See also ==
- Performance timelines for all female tennis players since 1978 who reached at least one Grand Slam final
