= Eastern Grass Court Championships =

Defunct tennis tournament
- Tour: USLTA
- Founded: 1927
- Abolished: 1969
- Editions: 43
- Location: Rye, N.Y, U.S. (1927–45); South Orange, N.J., U.S. (1946–69)
- Venue: Westchester Country Club (1927–45); Orange Lawn Tennis Club (1946–74)
- Surface: Grass

The Eastern Grass Court Championships was a combined men's and women's tennis tournament held on outdoor grass courts in the New York City area from 1927 to 1969. It was founded by the Eastern Lawn Tennis Association of the USLTA, and in 1939, became the first tennis competition to be televised in the United States.

== History ==
The Eastern Grass Court Championships were founded in 1927 under the aegis of the Eastern Lawn Tennis Association (the New York City regional chapter of the USLTA). Also in 1927 the Eastern Clay Court Championships began under the direction of the Eastern Lawn Tennis Association.

The first edition was held in 1927 at the Westchester Country Club, in Rye, New York. In 1946 the tournament relocated to the Orange Lawn Tennis Club in South Orange, New Jersey. The tournament was played on outdoor grass courts and was usually held in August. In 1970 the tournament was renamed the Marlboro Open, which continued until 1983.

== Finals ==
=== Men's singles ===
Year	Champions	Runners-up	Score
1927	(United States) Julius Seligson	(United States) William Aydelotte	6–3, 6–3, 9–7
1928	(United States) John Doeg	(United States) Fritz Mercur	7–5, 8–6, 6–1
1929	(United States) Bill Tilden	(United States) Francis Hunter	6–2, 6–2, 10-8
1930	(United States) Clifford Sutter	(United States) Gregory Mangin	4–6, 8–6, 7–5, 4–6, 6–1
1931	(United Kingdom) Fred Perry	(United States) J. Gilbert Hall	4–6, 8–6, 7–5, 4–6, 6–1
1932	(United States) Clifford Sutter (2)	(United States) Gregory Mangin	6–4, 4–6, 6–3, 6–0
1933	(United States) Sidney Wood	(United States) Clifford Sutter	6–1, 6–4, 6–4
1934	(United States) Frank Parker	(United States) George Lott	3–6, 7–5, 6–2, 8–6
1935	(United States) Bitsy Grant	(United States) Frank Shields	3–6, 6–3, 6–4, 7–9, 6–4
1936	(United States) Don Budge	(United States) Bobby Riggs	6–8, 6–2, 6–4, 6–3
1937	(United States) Bobby Riggs	(United States) Frank Parker	6–3, 7–5, 7–5
1938	(United States) Bobby Riggs (2)	(United States) Joe Hunt	6–4, 6–3, 3–6, 10-8
1939	(United States) Bobby Riggs (3)	(United States) Frank Parker	1–6, 6–4, 6–4, 7–5
1940	(United States) Bobby Riggs (4)	(United States) Don McNeill	6–2, 3–6, 7–5, 6–4
1941	(United States) Frank Kovacs	(United States) Wayne Sabin	7–5, 6–4, 6–2
1942	(United States) Ted Schroeder	(United States) Seymour Greenberg	w.o.
1943	(Ecuador) Pancho Segura	(United States) Joe Hunt	6–4, 6–1, 6–3
1944	(United States) Bill Talbert	(Ecuador) Pancho Segura	9–7, 6–4, 6–4
1945	(United States) Bill Talbert (2)	(Ecuador) Pancho Segura	4–6, 6–3, 6–2, 5–7, 6–0
1946	(United States) Don McNeill	(United States) Gardnar Mulloy	3–6, 4–6, 12–10, 7–5, 6–3
1947	(United States) Ted Schroeder (2)	(United States) Gardnar Mulloy	6–1, 7–5, 6–3
1948	(United States) Frank Parker (2)	(United States) Ted Schroeder	6–2, 9–7, 6–2
1949	(United States) Gardnar Mulloy	(United States) Arthur Larsen	5–7, 1–6, 6–2, 6–3, 6–2
1950	(United States) Herbert Flam	(United States) Vic Seixas	6–3, 6–3, 6–3
1951	(United States) Bill Talbert (3)	(United States) Gardnar Mulloy	6–4, 6–4, 6–2
1952	(Australia) Ken McGregor	(Australia) Frank Sedgman	6–3, 6–4
1953	(Australia) Lew Hoad	(Australia) Rex Hartwig	7–5, 6–4, 6–1
1954	(Australia) Lew Hoad (2)	(Australia) Ken Rosewall	6–3, 6–4, 6–3
1955	(United States) Sam Giammalva	(United States) Gilbert Shea	6–2, 3–6, 11–9, 9–7
1956	(United States) Ham Richardson	(Australia) Neale Fraser	6–3, 6–2, 6–2
1957	(United States) Dick Savitt	(United States) Vic Seixas	6–4, 6–4, 1–6, 8–6
1958	(Australia) Malcolm Anderson	(United States) Ham Richardson	6–3, 6–4, 6–8, 13–15, 6–4
1959	(Peru) Alex Olmedo	(United States) Mike Green	6–4, 3–6, 6–0, 6–2
1960	(Australia) Rod Laver	(United States) Donald Dell	6–1, 10–8, 6–4
1961	(United States) Chuck McKinley	(United States) Frank Froehling	6–3, 6–3, 6–2
1962	(Australia) Fred Stolle	(United States) Donald Dell	8–6, 14–16, 6–3, 6–4
1963	(United States) Gene Scott	(United States) Marty Riessen	6–4, 6–4, 6–4
1964	(United States) Arthur Ashe	(United States) Clark Graebner	4–6, 8–6, 6–4, 6–3
1965	(Australia) Fred Stolle (2)	(Australia) Roy Emerson	6–3, 2–6, 6–4, 6–4
1966	(Australia) Tony Roche	(United States) Clark Graebner	6–4, 6–4, 6–3
1967	(United States) Marty Riessen	(United States) Clark Graebner	18–16, 6–2, 6–1
↓ Open Era ↓
1968	(United States) Charles Pasarell	(United States) Clark Graebner	3–6, 4–6, 6–2, 6–3, 6–4
1969	(United States) Stan Smith	(United States) Clark Graebner	6–1, 6–4, 6–4

=== Women's singles ===
Year	Champions	Runners-up	Score
1927	(United States) Molla Bjurstedt Mallory	(United States) Charlotte Hosmer Chapin	2–6, 6–2, 7–5
1928	(United States) May Sutton Bundy	(United States) Charlotte Hosmer Chapin	4–6, 7–5, 6–4
1929	(United States) Sarah Palfrey	(United States) Mary Greef	6–1, 6–3
1930	(United States) Marjorie Gladman	(United States) Maud Rosenbaum	7–5, 4–6, 8–6
1931	(United Kingdom) Elsie Goldsack Pittman	(United Kingdom) Joan Ridley	shared
1932	(United Kingdom) Elsie Goldsack Pittman (2)	(United Kingdom) Joan Ridley	6–8, 6–1, 6–2
1933	(United Kingdom) Dorothy Round	(United Kingdom) Mary Heeley	6–2, 6–4
1934	(United Kingdom) Kay Stammers	(United Kingdom) Freda James	6–4, 3–6, 6–4
1935	(United States) Agnes Sherwood Lamme	(United States) Mary Greef	4–6, 8–6, 6–3
1936	(France) Sylvie Jung Henrotin	(United States) Helen Pedersen	5–7, 6–2, 6–2
1937	(Poland) Jadwiga Jędrzejowska	(United States) Alice Marble	7–5, 6–4
1938	(United States) Alice Marble	(United States) Dorothy Bundy	7–5, 6–0
1939	(United States) Alice Marble (2)	(United States) Sarah Palfrey Cooke	6–4, 6–4
1940	(United States) Alice Marble (3)	(United States) Helen Jacobs	6–1, 6–0
1941	(United States) Pauline Betz	(United States) Sarah Palfrey Cooke	2–6, 8–6, 7–5
1942	(United States) Louise Brough	(United States) Pauline Betz	6–3, 7–5
1943	(United States) Margaret Osborne	(United States) Doris Hart	6–2, 6–4
1944	(United States) Louise Brough (2)	(United States) Pauline Betz	6–3, 6–1
1945	(United States) Sarah Palfrey Cooke	(United States) Pauline Betz	5–7, 6–3, 6–3
1946	(United States) Shirley Fry	(United States) Virginia Wolfenden	6–4, 9–7
1947	(United States) Margaret Osborne (2)	(United States) Louise Brough	6–3, 4–6, 9–7
1948	(United States) Louise Brough (3)	(United States) Margaret Osborne duPont	6–3, 8–6
1949	(United States) Doris Hart	(United States) Shirley Fry	6–3, 6–4
1950	(United States) Doris Hart (2)	(United States) Louise Brough	6–4, 9–7
1951	(United States) Patricia Canning Todd	(United States) Maureen Connolly	3–6, 6–4, 6–2
1952	(United States) Doris Hart (3)	(United States) Shirley Fry	6–1, 6–3
1953	(United States) Doris Hart (4)	(United States) Shirley Fry	6–3, 2–6, 6–2
1954	(United States) Louise Brough (4)	(United States) Margaret Osborne duPont	8–6, 6–2
1955	(United States) Barbara Scofield	(United States) Barbara Breit	6–4, 1–6, 6–1
1956	(United States) Althea Gibson	(United States) Louise Brough	6–1, 6–3
1957	(United States) Mary Ann Mitchell	(United States) Jeanne Arth	7–5, 6–2
1958	(United States) Althea Gibson (2)	(United States) Sally Moore	9–7, 6–2
1959	(South Africa) Renée Schuurman	(South Africa) Sandra Reynolds	6–4, 1–6, 6–1
1960	(United States) Karen Hantze	(United States) Nancy Richey	6–1, 6–3
1961	(United States) Karen Hantze (2)	(West Germany) Edda Buding	6–2, 6–4
1962	(Australia) Margaret Smith	(United States) Karen Hantze Susman	6–3, 6–4
1963	(Australia) Margaret Smith (2)	(United States) Darlene Hard	6–1, 6–1
1964	(United States) Billie Jean Moffitt	(United States) Nancy Richey	7–5, 3–6, 8–6
1965	(United States) Billie Jean Moffitt (2)	(United States) Jane Albert	7–5, 6–3
1966	(United States) Donna Floyd Fales	(United States) Rosemary Casals	5–7, 6–3, 6–0

== See also ==
- Eastern Clay Court Championships
- Eastern Indoor Championships
- South Orange Open
