= 1928 U.S. National Championships – Men's singles =

Men's singles
- 1928 U.S. National Championships

Final
- Champion: (France) Henri Cochet
- Runner-up: (United States) Frank Hunter
- Score: 4–6, 6–4, 3–6, 7–5, 6–3

Details
- Seeds: 16

Events
Singles	men	women		boys	girls
Doubles	men	women	mixed	boys	girls
- U.S. National Championships

Henri Cochet defeated Frank Hunter in the final, 4–6, 6–4, 3–6, 7–5, 6–3 to win the men's singles tennis title at the 1928 U.S. National Championships. It was Cochet's first U.S. Championships singles title and fourth major singles title overall.

René Lacoste was the two-time reigning champion, but did not participate that year.

== Seeds ==
The tournament used two lists of players for seeding the men's singles event; one list of eight U.S. players and one list of six foreign players. Henri Cochet is the champion; others show the round in which they were eliminated.

1. (United States) John F. Hennessey (first round)
2. (United States) George Lott (semifinals)
3. (United States) Wilmer Allison (second round)
4. (United States) John Van Ryn (third round)
5. (United States) John Doeg (quarterfinals)
6. (United States) Francis Hunter (finalist)
7. (United States) Frank Shields (semifinals)
8. (United States) Fritz Mercur (semifinals)
1. (France) Henri Cochet (champion)
2. (France) Jean Borotra (third round)
3. (United Kingdom) Bunny Austin (third round)
4. (United Kingdom) Colin Gregory (first round)
5. (France) Jacques Brugnon (quarterfinals)
6. (Australia) Jack Crawford (quarterfinals)
7. (Australia) Jack Cummings (second round)
8. (Australia) Edgar Moon (first round)

== Draw ==
Key

- Q = Qualifier
- WC = Wild card
- LL = Lucky loser
- Alt = Alternate
- ITF = ITF entry
- PR = Protected ranking
- SR = Special ranking
- SE = Special exempt
- JE = Junior exempt
- JR = Junior Accelerator Programme entrant
- CO = College Accelerator Programme entrant
- NG = Next Gen Accelerator Program entrant
- w/o = Walkover
- r = Retired
- d = Defaulted

=== Final eight ===
Quarterfinals
(United States) George Lott	6	6	7
(United States) John Doeg	2	2	5
(Australia) Jack Crawford	5	6	3	4
(United States) Frank Hunter	7	3	6	6
(France) Jacques Brugnon	5	1	0
(United States) Frank Shields	7	6	6
(United States) Gregory Mangin	6	3	1	2
(France) Henri Cochet	4	6	6	6

Semifinals
(United States) George Lott	8	4	3	4
(United States) Frank Hunter	6	6	6	6
(United States) Frank Shields	2	6	4
(France) Henri Cochet	6	8	6

Final
(United States) Frank Hunter	6	4	6	5	3
(France) Henri Cochet	4	6	3	7	6

=== Earlier rounds ===
==== Section 1 ====
First round
2	(United States) Lott	6	6	6
(France) Landry	2	3	1
(United States) Jacobs	11	2	5	4
(United States) Griffin	9	6	7	6
(United States) Hyde	2	7	6	6
(United States) Strachan	6	5	3	3
(France) Boussus	6	6	6
(8)	(Australia) Moon	1	4	3
5	(United States) Doeg	6	7	6	6
(Mexico) Tapia	3	5	8	3
(Japan) Onda	7	6	6	6
(United States) Aydelotte	9	4	4	1
(Canada) Wright	2	6	3	6	6
(United Kingdom) Higgs	6	1	6	3	2
(Japan) Toba	1	6	4	6	1
(3)	(United Kingdom) Austin	6	3	6	4	6

Second round
2	(United States) Lott	6	6	6
(United States) Griffin	0	2	3
(United States) Hyde	5	1	6	2
(France) Boussus	7	6	4	6
5	(United States) Doeg	6	6	1	6
(Japan) Onda	4	4	6	4
(Canada) Wright	6	3	3	8	3
(3)	(United Kingdom) Austin	3	6	6	6	6

Third round
2	(United States) Lott	6	6	6
(France) Boussus	2	2	4
5	(United States) Doeg	6	5	6	6	6
(3)	(United Kingdom) Austin	4	7	2	8	2

Quarterfinals
2	(United States) Lott	6	6	7
5	(United States) Doeg	2	2	5

==== Section 2 ====
First round
4	(United States) Van Ryn	6	6	6
(United States) Morales	0	2	1
(Mexico) Unda	0	0	2
(United States) Herndon	6	6	6
(United States) Johnson	3	3	0
(United States) Gorchakoff	6	6	6
(United States) Wood	7	9	10	4
(6)	(Australia) Crawford	9	7	12	6
6	(United States) Hunter	6	6	7
(United States) Williams	1	4	5
(United States) Seligson	6	6	7
(United States) Quick	1	4	5
(United States) Jones	4	6	6	6
(United States) Cram	6	2	3	3
(Spain) Alonso	w/	o
(2)	(France) Borotra

Second round
4	(United States) Van Ryn	6	6	6
(United States) Herndon	2	4	4
(United States) Gorchakoff	8	9	3	5	1
(6)	(Australia) Crawford	6	7	6	7	6
6	(United States) Hunter	6	6	7
(United States) Seligson	3	3	5
(United States) Jones	2	3	4
(2)	(France) Borotra	6	6	6

Third round
4	(United States) Van Ryn	6	4	6	2	3
(6)	(Australia) Crawford	4	6	1	6	6
6	(United States) Hunter	0	5	6	6	6
(2)	(France) Borotra	6	7	0	4	2

Quarterfinals
(6)	(Australia) Crawford	5	6	3	4
6	(United States) Hunter	7	3	6	6

==== Section 3 ====
First round
1	(United States) Hennessey	5	4	4
(United States) King	7	6	6
(United States) Kynaston	6	6	1	6
(United States) Partridge	3	1	6	4
(United States) Gilpin	6	3	6	6
(United States) Paré	1	6	2	3
(United States) Fischer	2	3	6	6
(5)	(France) Brugnon	6	6	4	8
7	(United States) Shields	6	6	6
(Australia) Hopman	1	1	4
(United States) Feibleman	10	6	6
(United Kingdom) Collins	8	4	3
(United States) Coggeshall	6	1	3	8	6
(United States) Hall	2	6	6	6	4
(United States) Bowman	6	1	6	2	6
(4)	(United Kingdom) Gregory	3	6	3	6	2

Second round
(United States) King	6	6	7
(United States) Kynaston	3	3	5
(United States) Gilpin	4	6	5	4
(5)	(France) Brugnon	6	1	7	6
7	(United States) Shields	7	6	6
(United States) Feibleman	5	3	1
(United States) Coggeshall	6	6	6
(United States) Bowman	1	4	4

Third round
(United States) King	2	6	0	3
(5)	(France) Brugnon	6	4	6	6
7	(United States) Shields	11	6	6
(United States) Coggeshall	9	2	2

Quarterfinals
(5)	(France) Brugnon	5	1	0
7	(United States) Shields	7	6	6

==== Section 4 ====
First round
3	(United States) Allison	6	8	10
(United States) de Ricou	3	6	8
(France) de Buzelet	7	4	6	6
(United States) Garland	5	6	3	2
(United States) Brunie	6	1	4	4
(United States) Mangin	3	6	6	6
(United States) Johnson	2	4	6
(7)	(Australia) Cummings	6	6	8
8	(United States) Mercur	6	6	6
(United States) Dawson	4	3	1
(United States) McKnight	0	6	6	6
(Cuba) Upmann	6	2	2	2
(United States) Washburn	6	9	2	3	4
(United States) Coen	4	7	6	6	6
(United States) Wilber	0	2	1
(1)	(France) Cochet	6	6	6

Second round
3	(United States) Allison	6	6	4	4	1
(France) de Buzelet	2	1	6	6	6
(United States) Mangin	6	6	2	6
(7)	(Australia) Cummings	3	2	6	4
8	(United States) Mercur	3	6	6	7
(United States) McKnight	6	4	0	5
(United States) Coen	5	3	3
(1)	(France) Cochet	7	6	6

Third round
(France) de Buzelet	6	2	6	2
(United States) Mangin	8	6	3	6
8	(United States) Mercur	6	9	4	4
(1)	(France) Cochet	4	11	6	6

Quarterfinals
(United States) Mangin	6	3	1	2
(1)	(France) Cochet	4	6	6	6

Preceded by 1928 Wimbledon Championships	Grand Slams; Men's Singles	Succeeded by 1929 Australian Championships
