= Eastern Indoor Championships =

Eastern Indoor Championships Eastern States Indoor Championships

Defunct tennis tournament
- Tour: ILTF World Circuit (1944–77)
- Founded: 1944; 82 years ago
- Abolished: 1977; 49 years ago
- Location: Bergen; Hackensack; New York City; Waldwick
- Venue: Various
- Surface: Wood (indoors); Carpet (indoors)

The Eastern Indoor Championships also known as the Eastern States Indoor Championships was a men's and women's indoor tennis tournament founded in 1944. It was organized by the Eastern Lawn Tennis Association (today known as USTA Eastern). It was originally played on wood courts, then switching later to carpet courts until 1977 when it was discontinued.

== History ==
In February 1944, the Eastern Indoor Championships were established. The first two editions were played at the Bassford-Wood Courts, Lexington Avenue, New York City. This tournament is particular notable for allowing the tennis player and black woman Althea Gibson to play in a major United States Lawn Tennis Association tournament. Se advanced to the quarter finals in the singles, but was beaten by nationally ranked Betty Rosenquest, who won the event that year. The tournament was mainly played in New York City, in particular in Manhattan and the Bronx. It was also held in Bergen, New York, Hackensack, New Jersey, and Waldwick, New Jersey. The tournament was discontinued in 1977 as part of the ILTF Independent Tour, and became a regional USTA circuit event.

== Finals ==
=== Men's singles ===
(incomplete roll) In 1967 two editions of the men's championships were held one in January denoted as (*) and the other in March as (**).

Year	Location	Champions	Runners-up	Score
1944	NYC	(United States) Theodore Schein	(United States) Edward McGrath	6–4, 4–6, 6–3, 2–6, 6–3.
1945	NYC	(United States) Bill Talbert	(United States) Herbert Bowman	6–2, 6–1, 6–0.
1950	NYC	(United States) Charles Masterson	(United States) R. Philip Hanna	12–10, 7–5, 6–2.
1964	NYC	(United States) Donald Rubell	(United States) John Mangan	7–9, 6–4, 8–6, 6–4.
1965	Bergen	(United States) Herb Fitzgibbon	(United States) Ned Weld	3–6, 8–10, 6–4, 7–5, 3–1, ret.
1966	Waldwick	(United States) Eugene Scott	(United States) Robert Barker	6–1, 6–4, 6–1.
1967*	Waldwick	(United States) Eugene Scott (2)	(United States) Frank Froehling III	6–3, 6–3, 6–3.
1967**	Waldwick	(United States) Donald Rubell (2)	(United States) Tony Vincent	6–3, 6–2, 6–4.
1968	NYC	(Australia) Mike Callaghan	(Mexico) Gabino Palafox	6–8, 5–7, 6–3, 9–7.
↓ Open era ↓
1969	Hackensack	(United States) Butch Seewagen	(Mexico) Jaime Subirats	6–2, 13–11, 6–3.
1970	Hackensack	(United States) Herb Fitzgibbon (2)	(United States) Peter Fishbach	13–11, 7–5, 6–0.
1971	NYC	(United States) Herb Fitzgibbon (3)	(United States) John Adams	6–3, 6–2, 6–0.
1972	NYC	(United States) Vitas Gerulaitis	(United States) King Van Nostrand	6–2, 6–2, 6–1.
1973	NYC	(United States) Mike Grant	(United States) King Van Nostrand	6–2, 6–2, 6–1.
1974	NYC	(United States) King Van Nostrand	(United States) Warren Lucas	6–2, 4–6, 6–2, 6–3.
1975	NYC	(United States) Jon Molin	(United States) Art Carrington	4–6, 6–1, 6–7, 7–6, 6–4.

=== Women's singles ===
(incomplete roll)

Year	Location	Champions	Runners-up	Score
1944	NYC	(United States) Norma Taubele Barber	(United States) Mary J. M. Donnalley	6–2, 6–2
1945	NYC	(United States) Norma Taubele Barber (2)	(United States) Helen Germaine	1–6, 6–3, 6–2
1946	NYC	(United States) Norma Taubele Barber (3)	(United States) Edna Steinbach	6–2, 6–2
1947	NYC	(United States) Nina Irwin	(United States) Sylvia Knowles	7–5, 4–6, 7–5
1948	NYC	(United States) Barbara Wilkins	(United States) Nina Irwin	6–4, 4–6, 64
1949	NYC	(United States) Betty Rosenquest	(United States) Helen Germaine	6–4, 6–0
1950	NYC	(United States) Althea Gibson	(United States) Millicent Hirsch Lang	6–3, 6–1
1953	NYC	(Australia) Thelma Coyne Long	(United States) Lois Felix	6–0, 6–2
1964	NYC	(United States) Pat Stewart	(United States) Mimi Kanarek	6–2, 8–6
1966	Waldwick	(United States) Marilyn Aschner	(United States) Mimi Kanarek	6–3, 8–10, 7–5
1968	NYC	(Brazil) Maria-Cristina Dias	(United States) Marilyn Aschner	6–4, 4–6, 6–3
↓ Open era ↓
1970	Hackensack	(United States) Marilyn Aschner (2)	(United States) Louise Gonnerman	6–0, 7–5
1977	NYC	(United States) Barbara Potter	(United States) Kathy Mueller	6–3, 6–2

== See also ==
- Eastern Grass Court Championships
- Eastern Clay Court Championships
