= Long Island Indoor Championships =

Defunct tennis tournament
- Tour: ILTF World Circuit
- Founded: 1966; 59 years ago
- Abolished: 1972; 53 years ago
- Editions: 7 (men); 2 (women)
- Location: Brookville; Hempstead
- Surface: Carpet/ indoors

The Long Island Indoor Championships was a combined men's and women's USLTA/ILTF affiliated indoor carpet court tennis tournament founded in 1966. Also known as the Long Island Invitation Round Robin Indoor (as it was played in private institutions) during its early editions, It was first played at the Connolly Gymnasium, C.W. Post College, Brookville, New York, United States. It was last played David S. Mack Sports and Exhibition Complex, Hofstra University in Hempstead, New York in 1972.

== History ==
The event was first organised by USLTA and played at the Connolly Gymnasium in Brookville, New York in 1967 and usually played in Midwinter annually until 1970.

In 1971 it was moved in the tour calendar to early spring and the tournament was branded as the Dannon Tennis Classic for sponsorship reasons, by the food manufacturer Danone North America for its last two editions.

The event ran until 1972 when it was last played in Hempstead, New York then was discontinued.

== Finals ==
=== Men's singles ===
Year	Champions	Runners-up	Score
1967.	(United States) Arthur Ashe	(United States) Eugene Scott	RR 3-0 matches
1968	(United States) Clark Graebner	(Spain) Manuel Santana	RR 2-0 matches
1969	(United States) Eugene Scott	(Puerto Rico) Charlie Pasarell	RR
Open era
1970.	(United States) Cliff Richey	(United States) Clark Graebner	31–17
1971.	(Canada) Mike Belkin	(United States) Cliff Richey	6–3, 7–5
1972	(United States) Clark Graebner	(United States) Roscoe Tanner	6–2, 6–0

=== Women's singles ===
Year	Champions	Runners-up	Score
1968	(United States) Billie Jean King	(United States) Rosemary Casals	RR 2–0 matches
Open era
1969	(United States) Mary Ann Eisel	(United States) Carole Graebner	RR won

== Event names ==
Official

- Long Island Indoor Championships (1967–72)

Host Venue

- Long Island Invitation Round Robin Indoor (1967–68)

Sponsored

- Long Island Invitational Indoor (1969–70)
- Dannon Tennis Classic (1971–72)

== See also ==
- Long Island Championships (outdoor event)
- Long Island Masters (indoor event usually held in December annually)
