= Meadow Club Invitation =

Meadow Club Invitation Southampton Invitation

Defunct tennis tournament
- Tour: USNLTA Circuit (1887–1923); ILTF Circuit (1924–73)
- Founded: 1887; 139 years ago
- Abolished: 1973; 53 years ago
- Editions: 85
- Location: Southampton, Long Island, New York, United States
- Venue: The Meadow Club
- Surface: Grass

The Meadow Club Invitation or formally the Meadow Club of Southampton Invitation and also known as the Southampton Invitation or Southampton Invitational was predominantly a men's grass court tennis tournament established in 1887 at the Meadow Club, Southampton, Long Island, New York, United States. The tournament was staged as part of ILTC Circuit until 1973 when it was discontinued.

== History ==
In 1887 the Meadow Club was founded It is a private members located at Southampton, Long Island, New York, United States. The club inaugurated a major international tennis tournament called the Meadow Club Invitation

The tournament originally also carried the title of the Championship of Long Island. During its first decade, the event was recognized by the U.S. National Lawn Tennis Association (USNLTA) as a premier Sectional Championship, a designation used to formalize the regional competitive circuit across the United States. In this early era of American lawn tennis, the tournament functioned as one of the most prestigious grass-court stops on the Eastern circuit, frequently serving as a key preparatory event for the U.S. National Championships. Following the 1896 edition, the "Championship of Long Island" title largely disappeared from primary book sources at the Meadow Club, as the event transitioned into the more exclusive Southampton Invitation.

In 1909 the Long Island Championships was revived at the Kings County Tennis Club in Brooklyn, New York. Over its tenure, the event moved to various venues across the Long Island region, including its final home in Roslyn, New York, where the last edition was held in 1972.

The Southampton Invitaion was staged for 85 editions between 1888 and 1973, though it was not staged continuously. A women's invitation singles tournament was introduced briefly in the late 1920s to early 1940s under the title of the Southampton Invitational Round Robin or Meadow Club Invitational Round Robin, though women did take part most years in the mixed doubles events.

With the exception of 1903 when the English player Laurie Doherty won the men's event it was completely dominated by American players until the mid-1940s with multiple winners such as; Howard Augustus Taylor, Vinnie Richards, Bill Tilden II, Frank Parker, and Bobby Riggs. After World War II up until at least 1969 more foreign players won this event including; Pancho Segura, Roy Emerson, Ian Vermaak, Fred Stolle, Tony Roche and Owen Davidson and Rod Laver. The Meadow Club Invitation ran until 1973 when it was discontinued.

== Finals ==
=== Men's singles ===
(incomplete roll)

Year	Winners	Runners-up	Score
↓ USNLTA Circuit ↓
1887	(United States) Howard Augustus Taylor	(United States) Henry Warner Slocum	6-4, 7-9, 3-6, 9-7, 6-3
1888	(United States) Howard Augustus Taylor (2)	(United States) Joseph Sill Clark	6-8, 6-1, 1-6, 6-3, 6-3
1889	(United States) Howard Augustus Taylor (3)	(United States) Joseph Sill Clark	6-1, 6-4, 6-3
1890	(United States) Howard Augustus Taylor (4)	(United States) Rodmond Vernon Beach	6-2, 6-2, 6-2
1891	(United States) Valentine Gill Hall	(United States) Howard Augustus Taylor	w.o.
1892	(United States) Edward Ludlow Hall	(United States) Valentine Gill Hall	4-6, 6-1, 6-1, 2-6, 8-6
1893	(United States) William Larned	(United States) Edward Ludlow Hall	2-6, 6-3, 6-4, 6-0
1894	(United States) William Larned (2)	(Ireland) Manliffe Goodbody	6-1, 2-6, 6-2, 6-3
1899	(United States) Mal Whitman	(United States) Leo Ware	7-5, 6-4, 8-6
1903	(United Kingdom) Laurence Doherty	(United States) William Larned	6-1, 6-2, 6-1
1918	(United States) Bill Tilden II	(United States) Theodore Pell	6-4, 6-2, 6-4
1919	(United States) Chuck Garland	(United States) Willis Davis	6-4, 6-3, 6-3
1920	(United States) Vinnie Richards	(United States) William Jackson Clothier	6-4, 6-2, 4-6, 6-0
1921	(United States) Willis E. Davis	(United States) Vinnie Richards	3-6, 8-6, 6-3, 6-4
1922	(United States) Vinnie Richards (2)	(United States) Robert Kinsey	6-3, 6-4, 7-5
1923	(United States) Vinnie Richards (3)	(United States) Carl Fischer	6-2, 6-2, 6-2
↓ ILTF Circuit ↓
1924	(United States) Howard Kinsey	(United States) Harvey Burton Snodgrass	3-6, 4-6, 6-4, 6-1, 6-3
1925	(United States) Howard Kinsey (2)	(United States) George Lott	6-2, 6-4, 6-0
1926	(United States) Bill Tilden II (2)	(South Africa) Brian Norton	6-4, 4-6, 6-4, 7-5
1927	(United States) Bill Tilden II (3)	(United States) George Lott	6-2, 7-5, 6-2
1928	(United States) Berkeley Bell	(United States) Gregory Mangin	6-0, 6-3, 7-5
1929	(United States) Fritz Mercur	(United States) John Doeg	6-4, 6-3, 6-4
1930	(United States) Sidney Wood	(United States) Wilmer Allison	3-6, 6-3, 3-6, 6-2, 6-4
1931	(United States) George Lott	(United States) Clifford Sutter	6-3, 3-6, 2-6, 6-3, 6-1
1932	(United States) Sidney Wood (2)	(United States) Gregory Mangin	4-6, 6-2, 6-3, 12-14, 7-5
1933	(United States) Frank Shields	(United States) Frank Parker	6-2, 6-2, 6-1
1934	(United States) Frank Parker	(United States) Bryan Grant	6-3, 9-7, 6-0
1935	(United States) Frank Parker (2)	(United States) J. Gilbert Hall	7-5, 6-4, 6-1
1936	(United States) Frank Parker (3)	(United States) Gregory Mangin	1-6, 6-1, 6-2, 6-0
1937	(United States) Bobby Riggs	(Japan) Jiro Yamagishi	6-4, 6-3, ret.
1938	(United States) Bobby Riggs (2)	(United States) Sidney Wood	6-0, 6-3, 7-5
1939	(United States) Bobby Riggs (3)	(United States) Sidney Wood	10-8, 6-4, 6-4
1940	(United States) Don McNeill	(United States) Frank Kovacs	6-4, 6-3, 6-3
1941	(United States) Bobby Riggs (4)	(United States) Frank Kovacs	6-2, 6-2, 6-3
1942	(United States) Ted Schroeder	(United States) Sidney Wood	3-6, 6-1, 6-4, 1-6, 6-1
1943	(Ecuador) Pancho Segura	(United States) Sidney Wood	6-3, 7-5, 9-7
1944	(Ecuador) Pancho Segura (2)	(United States) Don McNeill	7-5, 2-6, 6-4, 6-1
1945	(United States) Bill Talbert	(Argentina) Alejo Russell	6-4, 6-2, 6-4
1946	(United States) Gardnar Mulloy	(United States) Bill Talbert	8-6, 6-0, 3-6, 2-6, 10-8
1947	(Ecuador) Pancho Segura (3)	(United States) Seymour Greenberg	6-4, 6-4, 4-6, 6-1
1948	(United States) Pancho Gonzales	(United States) Budge Patty	6-3, 6-0, 6-3
1949	(United States) Bill Talbert (2)	(United States) Pancho Gonzales	6-4, 5-7, 7-5, 6-2
1950	(United States) Earl Cochell	(United States) Gardnar Mulloy	9-7, 6-3, 4-6, 6-2
1951	(United States) Tony Trabert	(United States) Herb Flam	6-2, 10-8, 5-7, 6-3
1952	(United States) Noel Brown	(United States) Sidney Schwartz	8-6, 6-1, 6-0
1953	(United States) Jack Tuero	(United States) Charles F. Masterson	6-2, 10-8, 5-7, 3-6, 7-5
1954	(United States) Eddie Moylan	(United States) Bill Talbert	6-0, 6-2, 6-4
1955	(United States) Eddie Moylan (2)	(United States) Tony Trabert	6-3, 2-6, 6-8, 8-6, 1-0, ret.
1956	(Australia) Roy Emerson	(United States) Grant Golden	6-4, 6-1, 4-6, 8-6
1957	(United States) Whitney Reed	(Australia) Roy Emerson	10-8, 1-0, ret.
1958	(United States) Ham Richardson	(United States) Sammy Giammalva Jr.	6-4, 4-6, 6-3, 6-1
1959	(South Africa) Ian Vermaak	(South Africa) Raymond Weedon	6-1, 4-6, 6-1
1960	(Australia) Rod Laver	(United States) Ronald Holmberg	12-10, 6-3, 3-6, 2-6, 6-3
1961	(United States) Allen E. Fox	(Australia) Bob Mark	5-7, 8-6, 6-1, 4-4, ret.
1962	(Australia) Fred Stolle	(United States) Whitney Reed	7-5, 6-2, 8-6
1964	(United States) Gene Scott	(Puerto Rico) Charlie Pasarell	10-8, 7-5, 3-6, 4-6, 6-4
1965	(United States) Chuck McKinley	(United States) Gene Scott	3-6, 6-3, 8-6, 10-8
1966	(Australia) Tony Roche	(United Kingdom) Graham Stilwell	6-3, 5-7, 7-5, 6-4
1967	(Australia) Owen Davidson	(Australia) Ray Ruffels	6-4, 7-5, 6-4
1968	(United States) Ronald Holmberg	(United States) Gene Scott	6-4, 1-6, 6-3, 13-11
↓ Open era ↓
1969	(United States) Clark Graebner	(United States) Bob Lutz	6-2, 6-2, 6-4

=== Women's singles ===
Year	Winners	Runners-up	Score
1943	(United States) Pauline Betz (1st)	(United States) Louise Brough (2nd)	Round Robin

== See also ==
- Long Island Championships
