= Lou Howard =

Lou Howard

Lou Howard (December 16, 1923 – January 25, 2016) was an American high school football coach and politician. He is the only high school football coach in the Long Island Sports Hall of Fame. He was also a newspaper publisher, educator and aerospace instructor.

== Early life and education ==
Howard was raised in Amityville. He went to Amityville Memorial High where he played linebacker and was all-scholastic. He served in the Army Air Corps during World War II, entering as an aviation cadet and became a pilot. After the war he went to Brooklyn Polytechnic Institute, University of Missouri and University of Nebraska before graduating from Springfield College in 1948. He later obtained a master's in educational administration from Columbia University and a PhD in aerospace technology from Western Colorado University. Before returning to Amityville High School, he was director of the McBurney YMCA in Manhattan that was the inspiration for the Village People's song.

== Football coach ==
He was a driver's ed instructor and football coach 1952–1968 at Amityville Memorial High School, where he used motivational psychology to field his winning teams. He never had a losing season, won nine straight league championships, and has been ascribed as the originator of the shotgun formation. Howard wrote an article on the "exploded short punt offense" for the Scholastic Coach Magazine in 1956. Howard notes that this was the same basic offense used by Red Hickey four years later, that became called the shotgun. His team used the shotgun formation long before NFL teams. With 82 wins and 15 defeats, he has the highest winning percentage in Long Island history. With his knowledge of sports psychology he was asked to give pre-game talks for several NFL teams, including the Dallas Cowboys. He wrote several books on football, including one on the shotgun.

== Aerospace and educator ==
In 1969 Howard left Amityville High School to become founding chair of aerospace studies at Farmingdale State College. He helped pioneer and develop the program, which grew to be a 4 year degree program. He flew a plane on his 90th birthday celebration at Farmingdale. President Nixon appointed him to serve on a federal advisory committee to help design the first space shuttle for NASA. Howard authored a book on the usage of the instrument landing system, and it became the standard in the field. He also served as a flight instructor and F.A. A. flight examiner. During his legislative epoch, he split time between the legislature and SUNY-Farmingdale. He considered himself as an educator first, and then a politician; he continued at Farmingdale after the end of his political career. He served two terms on the SUNY Board of Trustees from 1997 – 2003. He retired from the Stony Brook Council, an oversight and advisory body at Stony Brook University, in the summer of 2015.

In 2013 he was inducted into the Farmingdale State College Aviation Hall of Fame.

== Elective Office ==
His entry to politics was in 1963 when won election as an Amityville Village Trustee, breaking 40 years of one-party rule. He personally visited every household in the town. In 1966 he won his first of his two terms as mayor, using the same formula. After coaching he turned to Suffolk County politics. Described as a maverick, he was a "formidable vote-getter," winning 14 times in his 24 years. In addition to mayor, he served one term in the New York State Assembly, and 16 years in the Suffolk Legislature. He did not run for reelection after his one term in the state assembly. He reported that he did not want to be away from his family and did not enjoy being a back bencher. When he left politics at age 63, he was the last remaining member of the first Suffolk County Legislature 17 years earlier. During his time as presiding officer of the legislature, he was called "petty, partisan and political." He responded: "I guess they're all true." While presiding officer of the legislature, minority Democratic bills were routinely bottled up in committee. He was thought to be vulnerable in 1987 and did not seek reelection; "I want to go out a winner," he noted. He was only one of 18 legislators who favored opening the Shoreham Nuclear Power Plant. He sought a fourth one-year term as presiding officer, but was defeated; the unpopular Shoreham position cost him the presiding post he had just held and increased his vulnerability for reelection.

== Personal ==
Howard married Grace Webber on May 15, 1948 in the St. Martin of Tours rectory; they could not be married in the church as Howard was not Catholic. The marriage lasted 67 years until his death. They had seven children. At the time of her death she was the oldest living lifelong Amityville resident. His eldest son, Thomas, was a football coach at Bay Shore High School, winning two Rutgers Trophies, awarded to the top high school football team in Suffolk County, to make eight for the father son duo. He was a Trustee in the Village of Amityville for 10 years and athletic director for 20 years at various high schools throughout Suffolk and Nassau counties. In 2018 he was elected to the Suffolk County Sports Hall of Fame. Son Patrick was JV football coach at Amityville High School for several years. Son Lou Howard Jr, physical education director for West Babylon schools, made a bid for the Suffolk Legislature, but lost.

He was an accomplished woodturner and a founding member of the Long Island Woodturners Association. Howard was a publisher and owner of the Amityville Record and the Suffolk Sun. Other business interests included a laminating company, travel agency, driving school, real estate broker and investment consulting; he was also a licensed masseur. He was once selected by the Aircraft Owners and Pilots Association as the "most interesting member."
