= 1929 U.S. National Championships – Men's singles =

Men's singles
- 1929 U.S. National Championships

Final
- Champion: (United States) Bill Tilden
- Runner-up: (United States) Frank Hunter
- Score: 3–6, 6–3, 4–6, 6–2, 6–4

Details
- Seeds: 14

Events
Singles	men	women		boys	girls
Doubles	men	women	mixed	boys	girls
- U.S. National Championships

Bill Tilden defeated Frank Hunter in the final, 3–6, 6–3, 4–6, 6–2, 6–4 to win the men's singles tennis title at the 1929 U.S. National Championships. It was Tilden's seventh and last U.S. Championships singles title, and ninth major singles title overall.

Henri Cochet was the reigning champion, but did not compete this year.

== Seeds ==
The tournament used two lists of players for seeding the men's singles event; one list of eight U.S. players and one list of six foreign players. Bill Tilden is the champion; others show the round in which they were eliminated.

1. (United States) Bill Tilden (champion)
2. (United States) George Lott (third round)
3. (United States) Francis Hunter (finalist)
4. (United States) John Doeg (semifinals)
5. (United States) John Van Ryn (quarterfinals)
6. (United States) Berkeley Bell (third round)
7. (United States) Fritz Mercur (semifinals)
8. (United States) Gregory Mangin (second round)
1. (United Kingdom) Bunny Austin (quarterfinals)
2. (South Africa) Norman Farquharson (second round)
3. (United Kingdom) John Olliff (third round)
4. (Japan) Tamio Abe (fourth round)
5. (United Kingdom) Ted Avory (third round)
6. (Cuba) Germán Upmann (second round)

== Draw ==
Key

- Q = Qualifier
- WC = Wild card
- LL = Lucky loser
- Alt = Alternate
- ITF = ITF entry
- PR = Protected ranking
- SR = Special ranking
- SE = Special exempt
- JE = Junior exempt
- JR = Junior Accelerator Programme entrant
- CO = College Accelerator Programme entrant
- NG = Next Gen Accelerator Program entrant
- w/o = Walkover
- r = Retired
- d = Defaulted

=== Final eight ===
Quarterfinals
(United States) Bill Tilden	7	2	9	6
(United States) John Van Ryn	5	6	7	2
(United States) John Doeg	6	6	6
(United Kingdom) Bunny Austin	4	4	3
(United States) Wilmer Allison	6	8	4
(United States) Fritz Mercur	8	10	6
(United States) Frank Hunter	6	6	6
(United States) R. Norris Williams	0	3	4

Semifinals
(United States) Bill Tilden	4	6	2	6	6
(United States) John Doeg	6	2	6	4	3
(United States) Fritz Mercur	4	8	4	3
(United States) Frank Hunter	6	6	6	6

Finals
(United States) Bill Tilden	3	6	4	6	6
(United States) Frank Hunter	6	3	6	2	4

=== Earlier rounds ===
==== Section 1 ====
First round

Second round
1	(United States) Tilden	6	6	6
(United States) Strachan	2	1	0
(United States) Appel	3	3	2
(United States) Shields	6	6	6
(United States) Dailey	1	4	6	0
(United States) Culley	6	6	3	6
(United States) Mooney	6	8	6
(6)	(Cuba) Upmann	4	6	3

Third round
1	(United States) Tilden	2	6	14	6
(United States) Shields	6	1	12	4
(United States) Culley	6	7	6	6
(United States) Mooney	1	5	8	2

Fourth round
1	(United States) Tilden	6	7	8
(United States) Culley	3	5	6

==== Section 2 ====
First round

Second round
5	(United States) Van Ryn	6	6	6
(United States) McKnight	2	2	2
(United States) Marsh	1	6	6	1	2
(United States) Brunie	6	4	4	6	6
(United States) Sutter	w/	o
(United States) Murphy
(Greece) Pappadopoulo	1	3	2
(4)	(Japan) Abe	6	6	6

Third round
5	(United States) Van Ryn	7	9	6
(United States) Brunie	5	7	0
(United States) Murphy	4	3	rtd.
(4)	(Japan) Abe	6	3

Fourth round
5	(United States) Van Ryn	6	8	5	6
(4)	(Japan) Abe	3	6	7	4

==== Section 3 ====
First round
(United States) Hyde	4	1	1
(United States) Wood	6	6	6
(United States) Wiley	6	6	9
(United States) Tovrea	2	0	7
(United States) Wilber	2	0	0
(United States) Seligson	6	6	6
(United States) Olhausen	7	5	4
(United States) Kynaston	9	7	6
(United States) Washburn	3	7	4	4
(United States) Partridge	6	5	6	6

Second round
4	(United States) Doeg	5	4	6	6	6
(United States) Lang	7	6	1	4	1
(United States) Sheridan	3	3	8	2
(United States) Wood	6	6	6	6
(United States) Wiley	1	1	1
(United States) Seligson	6	6	6
(United States) Kynaston	2	2	5
(United States) Partridge	6	6	7

Third round
4	(United States) Doeg	6	4	6	11
(United States) Wood	2	6	3	9
(United States) Seligson	6	6	6
(United States) Partridge	2	0	3

Fourth round
4	(United States) Doeg	9	6	6	6
(United States) Seligson	11	2	2	3

==== Section 4 ====
First round
6	(United States) Bell
(United States) Bayon	w/	o
(United States) Watt	7	5	1	2
(United States) Barnes	5	7	6	6
(United States) Gilpin	2	4	4
(United States) Feibleman	6	6	6
(United States) King	6	6	6
(United States) Coggins	2	1	1
(United States) Murray	w/	o
(United States) Smith
(United States) MacGuffin	2	4	6	6	6
(United States) Fischer	6	6	3	4	2
(United States) Bowman	6	6	6
(United States) Bonneau	4	1	2
(1)	(United Kingdom) Austin	6	7	6
(United States) Herndon	4	5	4

Second round
6	(United States) Bell	6	6	4	6
(United States) Barnes	2	3	6	3
(United States) Feiblemam	6	6	3	10
(United States) King	3	4	6	8
(United States) Smith	7	3	8
(United States) MacGuffin	9	6	10
(United States) Bowman	2	3	0
(1)	(United Kingdom) Austin	6	6	6

Third round
6	(United States) Bell	6	1	4	6	2
(United States) Feibleman	2	6	6	4	6
(United States) MacGuffin	2	8	6	2	3
(1)	(United Kingdom) Austin	6	6	2	6	6

Fourth round
(United States) Feibleman	6	7	2	1	3
(1)	(United Kingdom) Austin	2	5	6	6	6

==== Section 5 ====
First round
2	(United States) Lott	6	6	6
(United States) Binzen	4	0	1
(United States) Richard	2	2	2
(United States) Hall	6	6	6
(United States) Aydelotte	4	3	2
(United States) Burwell	6	6	6
(United States) Allison	6	6	6
(United States) Paré	3	2	4
(United States) Stevens	6	6	3	4	2
(United States) Griffin	2	4	6	6	6
(United Kingdom) Evans	5	7	6	3	2
(United States) Tarangioli	7	5	4	6	6
(United States) Burns	6	6	6
(United States) Kurzrok	2	3	4
(United States) Jennings	7	6	5	0	3
(5)	(United Kingdom) Avory	5	3	7	6	6

Second round
2	(United States) Lott	12	6	6
(United States) Hall	10	3	2
(United States) Burwell	0	2	4
(United States) Allison	6	6	6
(United States) Griffin	6	6	6
(United States) Tarangioli	3	1	0
(United States) Burns	5	2	4
(5)	(United Kingdom) Avory	7	6	6

Third round
2	(United States) Lott	3	3	6	6	5
(United States) Allison	6	6	3	3	7
(United States) Griffin	2	8	6	6
(5)	(United Kingdom) Avory	6	6	1	4

Fourth round
(United States) Allison	4	6	6	6
(United States) Griffin	6	3	0	0

==== Section 6 ====
First round
7	(United States) Mercur	6	4	6	6
(United States) McCauliff	4	6	4	0
(United States) Coggeshall	6	6	6
(United States) Baur	3	1	3
(United States) Johnson	9	1	0	5
(United States) Jones	7	6	6	7
(United States) Dickinson	2	3	4
(United States) Neer	6	6	6
(United States) Millen	6	6	3	6
(United States) Jenkins	1	1	6	3

Second round
7	(United States) Mercur	7	7	2	5	7
(United States) Coggeshall	5	5	6	7	5
(United States) Jones	15	6	8
(United States) Neer	13	1	6
(United States) Millen	6	6	6
(United States) Baggs	2	3	3
(United States) Gross	6	6	4	0	2
(3)	(United Kingdom) Olliff	2	3	6	6	6

Third round
7	(United States) Mercur	6	5	6	6
(United States) Jones	0	7	2	1
(United States) Millen	6	9	6
(3)	(United Kingdom) Olliff	0	7	3

Fourth round
7	(United States) Mercur	6	6	6
(United States) Millen	3	4	1

==== Section 7 ====
First round

Second round
3	(United States) Hunter	10	7	6
(United States) Jacobs	8	5	1
(Germany) Feuer	w/	o
(United States) Weir
(United States) Coen	6	6	6
(United States) Wolf	4	4	3
(United States) Anderson	5	6	4	8	0
(United States) Royer	7	4	6	6	6

Third round
3	(United States) Hunter	6	6	6
(United States) Weir	3	3	1
(United States) Coen	6	6	6
(United States) Royer	1	1	3

Fourth round
3	(United States) Hunter	4	7	6	6
(United States) Coen	6	5	1	4

==== Section 8 ====
First round

Second round
8	(United States) Mangin	6	3	0
(United States) Jones	8	6	6
(United States) Fischer	6	6	6
(United States) Von Bernuth	3	1	1
(United States) Williams	6	6	7
(United States) O'Connell	1	2	5
(United States) Dawson	8	6	6	6
(2)	(South Africa) Farquharson	10	1	2	4

Third round
(United States) Jones	6	5	4	7	7
(United States) Fischer	3	7	6	5	5
(United States) Williams	6	6	6
(United States) Dawson	2	4	4

Fourth round
(United States) Jones	6	6	3	3	2
(United States) Williams	4	3	6	6	6

Preceded by 1929 Wimbledon Championships	Grand Slams; Men's Singles	Succeeded by 1930 Australian Championships
