= American colossus =

American colossus may refer to

- American Colossus: The Triumph of Capitalism, 1865–1900, a 2010 history book by H. W. Brands
- American Colossus: Big Bill Tilden and the Creation of Modern Tennis, a 2018 biography by Allen M. Hornblum
- A nickname for the Statue of Liberty
- A term for American imperialism
