= William Aydelotte (tennis) =

American tennis player

- Full name: William Aydelotte
- Country (sports): USA
- Born: April 24, 1903 Santa Cruz, California, USA
- Died: June 8, 1997 (Age 94) Naples, Florida, USA
- Retired: 1936

Singles
- Career titles: 2

Grand Slam singles results
- US Open: 1R (1928, 1929)

William Aydelotte (April 24, 1903- – June 8, 1997) was an American tennis player in the 1920s and 1930s.

== Career ==
Aydelotte was born in California, but moved to New York and attended Horace Mann School before graduating from Princeton University. Aydelotte won the 1928 US indoor championships. After overcoming Herbert Bowman, Edward Herndon and Fritz Mercur earlier in the event, Aydelotte beat Julius Seligson in the final in five sets, showing "superior strength and steadiness". At the Brooklyn tournament later in the year, Aydelotte beat the Japanese player Sadakazu Onda in the final. "Onda won the first two sets through the persistence and steadiness of his returns, while Aydelotte was as wild as a hawk. Beginning with the third set, however, the New York A. C. athlete began to find the range with his forceful, blasting smashes and from that point on there was no question of who would win". Aydelotte continued to play until the mid-1930s. After retiring as President of Ter Bush and Powell Inc. (an independent insurance agency) in 1971, he was founder and chairman of Ayco Corporation and died in 1997. He was married and had a daughter and two sons.
