= Allen Behr =

American tennis player

- Full name: Allen Hawthorne Behr
- Country (sports): United States
- Born: 17 May 1890 New York City, United States
- Died: October 1970 (age 80) Palm Beach, Florida, United States
- Turned pro: 1909 (ILTF World Circuit); 1928 (Pro Tour)
- Retired: 1933

Singles
- Career record: 84–29
- Career titles: 7

Grand Slam singles results
- US Open: 3R (1927)
- Professional majors
- US Pro: 2R (1928, 1929, 1931, 1933)

Allen Hawthorne Behr (17 May 1890 – October 1970) was an American tennis player. He was active from 1909 to 1933 and won 7 career singles titles.

== Career ==
=== Amateur circuit ===
Allen Behr was born in New York City on 17 May 1890. He originally played on amateur USNLTA Circuit starting in June 1909 at his first singles competition at the Metropolitan Championships of New York played at the West Side Tennis Club, with a draw of eighty he lost in the preliminary round. He took part in the U.S. National Championships in 1918, 1920, 1925 and 1927.

His main amateur career highlights include winning the Norfolk Invitation Tournament (1925), Yonkers City Championships (1926), Brooklyn Championships (1926), Greater New York Championships (1927), Bergen County Open (1927) and the Nipnichsen Club Invitation (1927). In addition he was finalist at the Queensboro Championships (1926), New Jersey State Championships (1927), and the Kings County Championships (1925–1927),

In the early winter of 1927 he travelled to Europe to take part in events on the French Riviera Circuit. He was a finalist at the Cannes Gallia Club Championship losing to Henri Cochet. He reached the semi-finals of the Cannes New Court Club tournament, the Cannes Metropole Hotel Championship and Beaulieu International Championships. He won the Cannes Beau Site Hotel New Year Meeting against Charles Aeschlimann. He played his final amateur tournament on the ILTF World Circuit at the Canadian Covered Court Championships where he lost in the quarter finals to George Lott.

=== Professional tour ===
Behr turned professional in 1928 when he took part in the U.S. Pro Championships where he was defeated in the second round by Vincent Richards he never advanced beyond the second round for the years 1929 to 1931. In 1932 he reached the quarter finals stage of the Eastern Professional Championships, but lost to Hans Nüsslein the World No 1 player, the same year he took part in the U.S. Pro Indoors and exited in the second round to Emmett Paré. He played his final singles event in 1933 at the U.S. Pro Tennis Championships where he lost to Frank Hunter.

== Personal life ==
He was a cousin of fellow tennis player Karl Behr.
