= Kings County Championships =

Defunct tennis tournament
- Tour: USLTA Circuit (1890–22); ILTF World Circuit (1923–72)
- Founded: 1892; 133 years ago
- Abolished: 1942; 83 years ago
- Location: Brooklyn, United States
- Venue: Various
- Surface: Clay / outdoor Grass / outdoor

The Kings County Championships was an open international tennis tournament was founded in 1890 as the Kings County Inter-Club Association Annual Tournament in 1892. The tournament was first played at the Knickerbocker Field Club, Brooklyn, United States. It was played annually until 1942 when it was discontinued due to World War II.

== History ==
In August 1891 the Kings County Inter-Club Association was formed, it later became known as the Terrace-Kings County Tennis Association. The Kings County Inter-Club Association originally consisted of the Alitora Club, Brooklyn Tennis Club, Crescent Athletic Club, Kings County Tennis Club (founded 1886) and the Knickerbocker Field Club. In 1917 the event was moved to a permanent home at the Terrace Club, Flatbush, Brooklyn. The tournament was staged annually usually in June until the early 1940s when it was discontinued due to World War II.

== Finals ==
=== Men's singles ===
(incomplete roll)

Year	Champions	Runners-up	Score
1902	(Canada) Frederick G. Anderson	(United States) Lyle Evans Mahan	10–8, 9–7, 6–3.
1923	(United States) Percy Lloyd Kynaston	(United States) Isador Biltchik	3–6, 8–6, 6–3, 6–3.
1924	(United States) Percy Lloyd Kynaston (2)	(United States) Alfred J. Cawse	6–4, 6–3, 6–4.
1925	(United States) Percy Lloyd Kynaston (3)	(United States) Allen Behr	6–4, 1–6, 6–1, 6–3.
1926	(Germany) Louis Maria Heyden	(United States) Allen Behr	11–9, 6–3, 8–6.
1927	(United States) Julius Seligson	(United States) Allen Behr	9–7, 6–3, 6–4.
1928	(Japan) Sadakazu Onda	(United States) Don Lewis	6–2, 6–2, 6–0.
1929	(United States) Percy Lloyd Kynaston (4)	(Japan) Sadakazu Onda	3–6, 6–4, 6–4, 6–3.
1940	(United States) Frank Joseph Bowden	(Czechoslovakia) Ladislav Hecht	1–6, 6–3, 6–8, 6–0, 6–3.
1942	(Ecuador) Pancho Segura	(Czechoslovakia) Ladislav Hecht	6–4, 8–10, 6–4, 7–5.
