= Against Their Will =

Against Their Will may refer to:

- Against Their Will (Polyan book), a research book, Against Their Will... The History and Geography of Forced Migrations in the USSR by Pavel Polyan
- Against Their Will (Hornblum's book), a research book, Against Their Will: The Secret History of Medical Experimentation on Children in Cold War America by Allen M. Hornblum
- Against Their Will: Women in Prison, a 1994 TV movie by Judith Light
- Against Their Will, a 2002 Winston-Salem Journal documentary about eugenics in North Carolina
- Against Their Will, the English title of the 2012 French movie Malgré-elles of two girls' struggles during the second world war
