= Pacific Southwest Indoor Professional Championships =

Defunct tennis tournament
- Tour: NTL Pro Tour
- Founded: 1935; 90 years ago
- Abolished: 1935; 90 years ago
- Location: Los Angeles, United States
- Venue: Ambassador Auditorium
- Surface: Wood / indoor

The Pacific Southwest Indoor Professional Championships was a men's professional tennis tournament held only one time in November 1935. It was played on indoor courts at the Ambassador Auditorium, Los Angeles, United States from November 25 to November 27.

== History ==
The Pacific Southwest Indoor Professional Championships was a men's tennis tournament held only one time in November 1935. It was played on indoor courts at the Ambassador Auditorium, an 8000 capacity venue that was part of the now long gone Ambassador Hotel, Los Angeles, United States. The tournament featured a singles elimination event and a doubles event. Players who participated included; Norval Craig, Ben Gorchakoff, Clay Mahoney, Harvey Snodgrass, Lester Stoefen, Bill Tilden and Walter Wesbrook, and included a silver trophy cup donated by the film star Mary Pickford. It was an early precursor event to the West Coast Pro Indoor Championships held five years later in 1940 at the same venue.

== Finals ==
=== Singles ===
Year	Champions	Runners-up	Score
1935	(United States) Lester Stoefen	(United States) Bill Tilden	9–7, 6–4, 6–3.
