= Long Island Championships =

Defunct tennis tournament
- Founded: 1887
- Abolished: 1972
- Location: Brooklyn; Great Neck; Jackson Heights; Port Washington; Roslyn; Southampton; Woodmere
- Surface: Grass

The Long Island Championships was a USLTA/ILTF affiliated tennis tournament founded in 1887 as the Championship of Long Island a grass court event it was first played at the Meadow Club, Southampton, Long Island. The event ran annually until 1972 when it was last played in Roslyn, New York, United States when it was discontinued.

== History ==
The 1887 Meadow Club Invitation tournament originally also carried the title of the Championship of Long Island. During its first decade and a half, the event was recognized by the U.S. National Lawn Tennis Association (USNLTA) as a premier Sectional Championship, a designation used to formalize the regional competitive circuit across the United States.

In this early era of American lawn tennis, the tournament functioned as one of the most prestigious grass-court stops on the Eastern circuit, frequently serving as a key preparatory event for the U.S. National Championships. Following the 1902 edition, the "Championship of Long Island" title largely disappeared from primary book sources at the Meadow Club, as the event transitioned into the more exclusive Southampton Invitation.

In 1907 the Long Island Championships was officially revived and designated at the Kings County Tennis Club in Brooklyn, New York. Over its tenure, the event moved to various venues across the Long Island region, including its final home in Roslyn, New York, where the last edition was held in June 1972.

== Finals ==
=== Men's Singles ===
(incomplete roll)

Year	Champion	Runner-up	Score
↓ USNLTA Circuit ↓
1887	(United States) Howard Taylor	(United States) Henry Slocum	6–4, 7–9, 3–6, 9–7, 6–3
1888	(United States) Howard Taylor (2)	(United States) Joseph Sill Clark Sr.	6–8, 6–1, 1–6, 6–3, 6–3
1889	(United States) Howard Taylor (3)	(United States) Joseph Sill Clark Sr.	6–1, 6–4, 6–3
1890	(United States) Howard Taylor (4)	(United States) Rodmond Beach	6–2, 6–2, 6–2
1891	(United States) Valentine Gill Hall	(United States) Howard Taylor	w.o.
1892	(United States) Edward L. Hall	(United States) Valentine Gill Hall	4–6, 6–1, 6–1, 2–6, 8–6
1893	(United States) William Larned	(United States) Edward L. Hall	2–6, 6–3, 6–4, 6–0
1894	(United States) William Larned (2)	(Ireland) Manliffe Goodbody	6–1, 2–6, 6–2, 6–3
1899	(United States) Mal Whitman	(United States) Leo Ware	7–5, 6–4, 8–6
1909	(United States) William Cragin	(United States) Fred Alexander	w.o.
1918	(United States) Frank T. Anderson	(United States) Fred C. Anderson	3–6, 6–4, 6–4, 6–3
1919	(United States) Samuel Howard Voshell	(United States) Fred C. Anderson	6–3, 6–4, 6–3
1921	(United States) Percy Kynaston	(United States) Carl N. Joliffe	9–7, 3–6, 6–3, 6–2
1922	(United States) Jerry Lang	(United States) Percy Kynaston	6–3, 4–6, 7–9, 6–3, 7–5
1923	(United States) Jerry Lang (2)	(United States) George R. Preston	6–1, 4–6, 6–4, 8–6
1924	(United States) Percy Kynaston (2)	(United States) Anton Frederick Von Bernuth	6–1, 6–1, 6–3
1925	(United States) Vinnie Richards	(United States) Jerry Lang	6–2, 6–3, 6–2
1926	(United States) Percy Kynaston (3)	(United States) Maurice A. Ferrier	1–6, 6–2, 6–1, 2–1 ret.
1929	(United States) Jerry Lang (3)	(United States) Lawrence Kurzrok	6–4, 6–3, 6–3
1930	(United States) Elmer Griffin	(United States) Percy Kynaston	2–6, 6–2, 6–3, 6–1
1963	(United States) Don Rubell	(United States) Sidney Schwartz	4–6, 7–5, 6–3
1964	(United States) Herb Fitzgibbon	(United States) Bob Barker	9–7, 6–1, 6–4
1966	(United States) Herb Fitzgibbon (2)	(United States) Bob Barker	6–4, 6–1
1967	(United States) Gene Scott	(United States) Peter Fishbach	8–6, 6–4, 7–9, 6–2
1968	(United States) Gene Scott (2)	(United States) Peter Fishbach	6–4, 6–4, 6–4
1969	(United States) Dick Stockton	(United States) Peter Fishbach	?
1970	(United States) Dick Stockton (2)	(United States) Peter Fishbach	6–4, 7–5
1971	(United States) Gene Scott (3)	(United States) Peter Fishbach	6–4, 4–6, 7–6
1972	(United States) Steve Ross	(United States) King Van Nostrand	6–3, 4–6, 6–3

=== Women's Singles ===
Year	Champion	Runner-up	Score
1919	(United States) Marie Wagner	(United States) Mrs E Lynch	8–6, 6–3
1920	(United States) Florence Ballin	(United States) Marie Wagner	4–6, 6–1, 9–7
1922	(United States) Marie Wagner (2)	(United States) Mrs Samuel Waring	6–1, 6–1

== See also ==
- Long Island Clay Court Championships
