= U.S. National Indoor Professional Championships =

Defunct tennis tournament
- Tour: Pro Tennis Tour (1931-1965)
- Founded: 1931; 94 years ago
- Abolished: 1966; 59 years ago
- Location: Chicago; New York City; Philadelphia; White Plains
- Venue: Penn Athletic Club (1931, 1933, 1947); 71st Regiment Armory (1932, 1965)
- Surface: Wood / indoor

The U.S. National Indoor Professional Championships also known as the U.S. Pro Indoor was a men's professional wood court indoor tennis tournament founded in 1931. It was first played the Penn Athletic Club, in Philadelphia, United States.

== History ==
The U.S. National Professional Indoor Championships was a men's tennis tournament sanctioned by the United States Professional Lawn Tennis Association (USPLTA), and first held in May 1931, and was first played on indoor wood courts at the Penn Athletic Club, Philadelphia, United States. In 1932 the second edition was also played at the 71st Regiment Armory in New York City. In 1933 the tournament was held again at the Penn Athletic in Philadelphia. In 1964 the tournament was held in White Plains, New York. In 1965 in what would be the final edition it was again played at the 34th St Armory then was discontinued.

== Finals ==
=== Men's singles ===
(Incomplete roll)

Year	Location	Champions	Runners-up	Score
1931	Philadelphia	(United States) Bill Tilden	(United States) Vinnie Richards	6–4, 5–7, 7–5, 6–2.
1932	New York City	(United States) Vinnie Richards	(United States) Charlie Wood jr	6–3, 6–4, 6–4.
1933	Philadelphia	(United States) Bill Tilden (2)	(United States) Vinnie Richards	6–4, 5–7, 7–5, 6–2.
1947	Philadelphia	(United States) Bobby Riggs	(United States) Don Budge	6–1, 8–6, 6–3.
1964	White Plains	(United States) Pancho Gonzales	(Australia) Ken Rosewall	5–7, 3–6, 10–8, 11–9, 8–6.
1965	New York City	(United States) Pancho Gonzales (2)	(Australia) Ken Rosewall	6–4, 5–7, 7–5, 6–2.

=== Men's doubles ===
(Incomplete roll)

Year	Location	Champions	Runners-up	Score
1932	New York City	(Republic of Ireland) Albert Burke (United States) Vinnie Richards	(United States) Charlie Wood jr (United States) Emmett Paré	20–18, 6–3, 3–6, 4–6, 6–3.
