= Amityville Memorial High School =

Location
- 250 Merrick Road; Amityville, New York 11701; United States; 40°40′13″N 73°24′44″W

Information
- Type: Public high school
- Motto: "Education is for improving the lives of others and for leaving your community and world better than you found it."
- Established: 1894
- School district: Amityville Union Free School District
- Principal: John Cardone
- Faculty: 78.81 (on an FTE basis)
- Grades: 9th – 12th
- Enrollment: 936 (2024–2025)
- Student to teacher ratio: 11.88
- Colors: Red and grey
- Team name: Tide
- Website: Amityville High School

Amityville Memorial High School is a public high school located in Amityville, New York, United States, on the south shore of Long Island. It is part of the Amityville Union Free School District, which includes the village of Amityville and portions of North Amityville and East Massapequa, as well as a section of Copiague. The school follows the New York State Regents guideline and offers Advanced Placement (AP) and Syracuse University credited courses.

The members of hip-hop group De La Soul were students of Amityville High School, and released their debut LP 3 Feet High and Rising soon after (1989). Eddie Reyes, founder of Taking Back Sunday, also hails from Amityville.

== Sports ==
The sports teams' colors are red and gray, and the mascot is a Warrior.

Amityville is the home of legendary high school football coach, Lou Howard. In the 1950s and 1960s, Howard's Amityville teams were nearly unbeatable. Bernie Wyatt (defensive back for the University of Iowa) and John Niland (offensive lineman for the famed Dallas Cowboys) were two of Coach Howard's greatest players. The school won the Long Island Football Championships in 1999 and 2007.

The school is the home of the Amityville Warriors basketball team. The Warriors won the New York State Public High School Athletic Association Boys Basketball Championships four consecutive years (2000 to 2003). They were all coached by Hall of Fame coach, Jack Agostino. The Warriors also made the trip in 2004, but lost to the would-be champions, Jamesville-Dewitt. Notable Warriors include NBA player Mike James, Shelton Jones, Jason Fraser, and current NBA point guard AJ Price.

== Notable alumni ==
- Ronald DeFeo Jr., Amityville mass murderer
- Lou Howard, football coach and aerospace educator
- Paul Huston aka Prince Paul, record producer and hip hop recording artist
- Mike James, basketball player, Duquesne University, New Orleans Hornets
- David Jude Jolicoeur, member of hip hop group De La Soul
- Shelton Jones, basketball player, St. John's University, San Antonio Spurs (retired)
- Kevin R. Kregel, NASA astronaut
- Nancy Leftenant-Colon 1920 - 2025, first black woman allowed to be in the regular United States Army Nurse Corps
- Vincent Mason, member of hip hop group De La Soul
- Bill McDermott, CEO of ServiceNow
- Kelvin Mercer, member of hip hop group De La Soul
- John Niland, football player, Dallas Cowboys All-Pro (retired)
- AJ Price, basketball player, Cleveland Cavaliers
- Darrel Young, football player, Washington Redskins
