= Long Island Sports Hall of Fame =

Hall of fame for Long Island sports celebrities

The Long Island Sports Hall of Fame was established in 1984 to honor sports figures who lived or played on Long Island, New York. The physical location was a small display on the lower level of the now "dark and dormant" Nassau Coliseum through at least 1994. Among the first inductees chosen were American footballers John Schmitt, Jim Brown and Ed Danowski, basketball's Julius Erving, polo's Tom Hitchcock, Yankee pitcher Whitey Ford, ice hockey's Mike Bossy, Dodger catcher Roy Campanella and bowler Andy Varipapa. The first induction was on November 30, 1984. Early induction ceremonies were formal events, with a 1987 report that a "black-tied crowd will be out in force."

The Long Island Sports Hall of Fame is now defunct.

Other members include:

- Vinny Testaverde (1987)
- Charlie Jarzombek
- Don Dunphy (1986)
- Woody Stephens (1988)
- Bob Sheppard
- Pete Bostwick (1987)
- Frank Sprig Gardner (1987)
- (Bandleader) Guy Lombardo (1987, a speed boat enthusiast)
- William Shea (1987)
- Ron Turcotte (1990)
- Ernie Vandeweghe (1987)
- Billy Smith
- Kingdon Van Nostrand (1987)
- Lou Howard Sr., Amityville football coach
