= Politics of Long Island =

Long Island, as a major region of New York State, has a significant impact on state and national politics.

== Government ==
Nassau County and Suffolk County each have their own governments, with a county executive leading each. Each has a county legislature as well as other countywide-elected officials, such as district attorney, county clerk and county comptroller. The towns in both counties have their own governments as well, with town supervisors and a town council.

Brooklyn and Queens, on the other hand, do not have independent county governments. As boroughs of New York City, both have borough presidents, largely ceremonial offices with little political power since the shutdown of the city's Board of Estimate due to a Supreme Court decision which declared it unconstitutional and led to a reorganization of the city government.

== Federal elections ==
Politically, Nassau and Suffolk counties were long controlled by the Republican Party. Republican presidential candidates won both counties from 1900 until 1988, with the exception of the 1912 victory of Woodrow Wilson and the Lyndon B. Johnson landslide of 1964. In 1972, Richard Nixon won Nassau, Suffolk, and Queens, and came within 14,000 votes of winning heavily Democratic Brooklyn. This remains the last time that a Republican won Queens, and no Republican has carried Brooklyn since 1924.

In 1992, Nassau voted Democratic and has done so through 2020, although sometimes by fairly close margins. Suffolk County voted Democratic in 1996 and stayed there through the 2012 elections, also by fairly close margins. For instance, in 2004, John Kerry won Suffolk County by just under 14,000 votes. The close 2004 margins followed large victories for Al Gore in Nassau and Suffolk in 2000, and many observers think the 2004 results were more of a reflection of a 9/11 bump President George W. Bush received through portions of the New York City metro area (as his numbers jumped quite a bit from 2000 in Staten Island, Rockland County, and parts of North Jersey as well) rather than a reversal of the Democratic trend. In 2016, Suffolk County voted for the Republican Donald Trump, while Nassau County voted for the Democrat Hillary Clinton, with an overall combined victory for Trump on Long Island. In 2020, Nassau and Suffolk again split, with Suffolk voting for Trump, however by a greatly reduced margin of just 232 votes, and Nassau voting for Democrat Joe Biden, by an increased margin. This, in contrast to 2016, led to an overall combined victory for Biden on Long Island. Suffolk County was the closest county by percentage in the nation in 2020. In 2024, both Nassau and Suffolk went for Trump, by sizable margins. This reflected the general shift seen across the country towards Trump.

Five of New York's 26 congressional districts are located on Long Island. The 1st, 2nd, and 4th districts are entirely located on Long Island, while the 3rd is primarily within Long Island with a small portion in Queens, and the 5th is primarily located within Queens. Of them, the Democratic Party represents three; Tom Suozzi in the 3rd district, Laura Gillen in the 4th and Gregory Meeks in the 5th district. The Republicans are represented by Nick LaLota and Andrew Garbarino in the 1st and 2nd districts, respectively.

== State politics ==
In 2000, Senator Hillary Clinton lost both Nassau and Suffolk to Republican Rick Lazio, who had previously served as a congressman from Suffolk County. While the 2004 results did show a much stronger showing for Republican President George W. Bush across Nassau and Suffolk County, it did not hurt Democrat Chuck Schumer and his re-election bid in the area. Schumer won both Nassau and Suffolk in a landslide receiving close to 70% of the vote in both counties. Republican Governor George Pataki won both Nassau and Suffolk in all three of his victories.

In 2006, Long Island continued its Democratic trend. Helped by a strong Democratic win nationwide, Democrats Eliot Spitzer and Hillary Clinton won Long Island in a landslide in the gubernatorial and U.S. Senate race respectively. Democratic Comptroller Alan Hevesi, despite being scandal-ridden, won on Long Island, and Democrat Andrew Cuomo won all of the island's counties in the attorney general race, with Republican Jeanine Pirro narrowly losing in Suffolk. Republican Peter T. King held on to his congressional seat in a race against Nassau County Legislator Dave Mejias by a 56%–44% margin, even as two other New York Republican congressmen lost their seats upstate and one open Republican seat flipped to the Democrats. His 12-point margin of victory was less than half his margins in past elections. Democratic strength has eroded in the region recently, as Republicans swept every county and congressional district in the 2022 elections, which comes after Democrat Barack Obama did the same in 2008 and 2012.

Much of the traditional edge Republicans have had in the New York State Senate is due to dominating elections for these offices on Long Island, but the election of a Democrat to replace Michael Balboni in 2007 for the 7th district on Nassau County's North Shore demonstrated a recent weakness at that level of government as well. During the 2016 elections, Democrats flipped one state senate seat and came close to flipping three others, and in the 2018 midterm elections, the Democrats flipped four State Senate seats on Long Island, and the Democrats took control of the State Senate. However, Republicans came to hold all Senate and Assembly seats on Long Island after the 2022 elections, but Democrats retained their majorities in both chambers due to their overwhelming strength in certain Upstate counties and every New York City Borough except Staten Island.

On the western side, both Brooklyn and Queens are reliably Democratic, although Queens became that way fairly recently, having still been politically volatile through the 1980s. This is mainly a consequence of the recent changes in Queens' demographics, which changed from white-middle-class suburbs to minority-majority.

== Local politics ==
In 1996, the first Nassau County Legislature was elected with a Republican majority of 13–6 with Bruce Blakeman becoming the first Presiding Officer in the county's history. In 2001, Nassau County elected Democrat Tom Suozzi as county executive and Democrats took control of the county legislature, marking the first time Democrats had full control over county governments. Republicans still held on to the District Attorney's office and Hempstead town government, which has not had a Democratic majority on the town council or held the town supervisor position in close to 100 years. In 2003, Suffolk County followed suit, electing Democrat Steve Levy as county executive.

Thomas Spota defeated three-time incumbent James M. Catterson Jr. to become Suffolk County District Attorney in 2001. He was re-elected in 2005, 2009, and 2013 without any major-party opposition. The 2005 election saw Nassau move further into Democratic hands. Denis Dillon, the Republican Party District Attorney of Nassau County for over thirty years, lost his re-election bid to the Democrat Kathleen Rice. The Republicans also lost the Town of Brookhaven, long known as a bastion of Republican corruption and patronage on the Island. The Suffolk County sheriff's race also resulted in a Democratic win by cross-endorsement of a Conservative Party member. For the first time in years, Democrats controlled the Suffolk County Legislature. In 2006, for the first time ever, Democrats controlled a majority of government offices in both counties including county executives, legislatures, and district attorneys. After the 2009 elections, Democrats lost heavily in various communities including losing the Nassau County executive, numerous legislatures, and attorneys.

In 2009, Ed Mangano, a Republican, was elected in an upset victory over County Executive Tom Suozzi in Nassau. In 2011, Steve Bellone, a Democrat, was elected the 8th Suffolk County Executive. In 2017, Laura Curran was elected County Executive in Nassau as a Democrat. The current district attorneys of both Suffolk and Nassau are Republicans, the current county clerks of both counties are Republicans, the current comptrollers of both counties are Republicans, and the current Sheriff of Suffolk is a Democrat elected with Conservative Party support; Nassau County does not have an elected Sheriff.

In 2017, some of those offices have returned to the Democratic Party. While in Suffolk County, the Republican Party had long since taken back the Town of Islip in 2011 as well as the Town of Brookhaven in 2012 and flipped control of the Town of Huntington in 2017. The Democratic Party did win the Supervisor seats in both the Town of Hempstead and the Town of Riverhead in 2017, but those gains reversed back to the Republican Party in 2019, while the Supervisor of the Town of Shelter Island reversed from a Republican gain in 2017 back to a Democratic gain in 2019. The Towns of Smithtown and Oyster Bay have consistently maintained Republican majority for several decades, and the Towns of North Hempstead and Babylon have similarly been dominated by Democratic majorities for several decades. The Town of East Hampton and Town of Southampton, as well as the City of Glen Cove and City of Long Beach, have elected both Republican and Democratic majorities in the last two decades.

In the 2021 elections, Suffolk County had a 'red wave', Republicans captured the DA and 11 of 18 legislative districts. This marks the first time in 16 years Republicans captured a majority and 21 years since holding the District Attorney. Democratic leaders were swept from office by Republicans — even though registered Democrats outnumber Republicans by 100,000 in the county. The Nassau County elections offered a similar picture, as voters readily ousted the county's Democrats, electing Republicans down the ballot. The District Attorney, County Executive, Bruce Blakeman and Comptroller offices all went into GOP hands. The Town of North Hempstead elected a Republican Supervisor for the first time since 1989.

However during the 2026 New York gubernatorial election Kathy Hochul carried both Nassau County and Suffolk County. Democrats also flipped the town of hempstead electing a Democratic supervisor and town clerk which had been considered a major upset.

== See also ==
- Politics of New York (state)
- Elections in New York

== External ==
- Suffolk County Legislature
- Nassau County Legislature
