= Mimi Kanarek =

American tennis player (1932–2026)

- Full name: Miriam Kanarek
- Country (sports): United States
- Born: August 18, 1932 Managua, Nicaragua
- Died: June 14, 2026 (aged 93)
- Plays: Right-handed

Grand Slam singles results
- US Open: 3R (1967)

Miriam Kanarek "Mimi" Donegan (August 18, 1932 – June 14, 2026) was an American professional tennis player.

== Biography ==
Originally from Nicaragua, Kanarek moved to Brooklyn, New York as 13-year old and came to the sport late, first picking up a racket when she was 16. She featured in the singles main draw of the 1968 US Open and lost a close first round match to Frances MacLennan, 9–11 in the third set. Outside of her playing career she was also involved in running local tennis facilities, including The River Tennis Club in Hastings, New York. Kanarek died on June 14, 2026, at the age of 93.
