= American Colossus: Big Bill Tilden and the Creation of Modern Tennis =

2018 biography of Bill Tilden

- First edition cover
- Author: Allen M. Hornblum
- Genre: Biography
- Published: March 2018
- Publisher: University of Nebraska Press
- Pages: 512
- ISBN: 9780803288119

American Colossus: Big Bill Tilden and the Creation of Modern Tennis is a 2018 hardcover biography of American tennis athlete Bill Tilden written by Allen M. Hornblum, a journalist who considered Tilden a great athlete and wrongly forgotten by history. The book mostly focuses on Tilden's life as a very successful athlete who won the Wimbledon Championships, Davis Cup, and U. S. Open all multiple times. American Colossus credits Tilden with tennis's popularization and attributes his consignment to obscurity to Tilden being shunned for his sexual behavior. The Telegraph called the book "excellent", and the Northeast Times praised its narration of tennis matches. The Times Literary Supplement thought Tilden "remains in shadow" in American Colossus.

== Development ==
Journalist Allen M. Hornblum believed that American tennis athlete Bill Tilden was wrongfully, in his words, "the most forgotten great athlete in American history" and "washed out from the sport's history book". Tilden slipped into obscurity after being convicted of contributing to the delinquency of a minor, a case that Hornblum reported he attempted to look into but was unable to discover little about, as the courts lost the case files and little documentation survives. Hornblum wrote a biography of Tilden, and in 2016 (while his biography was in press) he advocated for Tilden's hometown of Philadelphia to establish a public commemorative plaque memorializing Tilden. The University of Nebraska Press published Hornblum's biography, American Colossus: Big Bill Tilden and the Creation of Modern Tennis, as a 512-page hardcover book in March 2018.

== Content ==
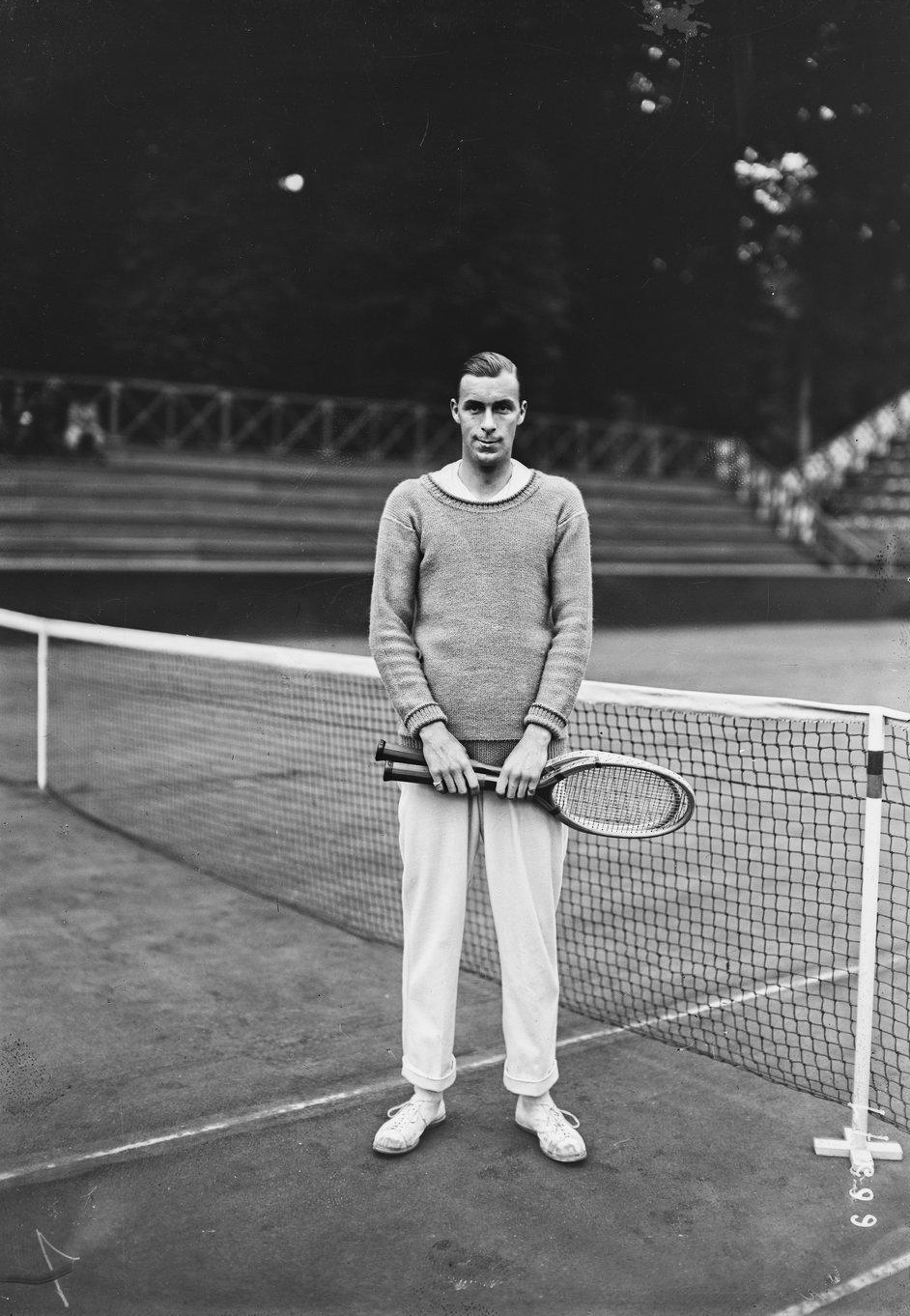
Bill Tilden in 1921

American Colossus is a biography of Bill Tilden (nicknamed "Big Bill"), an amateur tennis athlete who Hornblum argues was "the greatest athlete the upper classes ever produced", "may be the greatest gay male athlete produced in America", and one of four "great athletes" in the history of sport. (Note: Hornblum considers the other "great athletes" in sports history to have been Babe Ruth, Jack Dempsey, and Bobby Jones.) The biography principally focuses on Tilden's life as an athlete. After becoming the first American to ever win the Wimbledon Championships in 1920, he went on to win Wimbledon twice more, the Davis Cup seven times, American singles tournaments seven times, and the U. S. Open seven times (six times in a row). During the 1920s, Tilden "was the most famous sportsman in the world", in reviewer Simon Briggs's words. Hornblum credits Tilden with turning tennis from an elite lawn activity to a heavily watched popular sport. In addition to being an athlete, Tilden wrote more than 24 books, including novels and nonfiction books about tennis. Tilden's attempts to popularize tennis brought him into conflict with the United States Lawn Tennis Association, which tried to guard tennis' status as a sport for upper classes.

American Colossus also narrates the decline of Tilden's reputation and popularity, attributing it to the circulation of news about two convictions he received (in 1946 and 1949) after being twice found making intimate advances to male teenagers. Hornblum argues Tilden's public standing never recovered from this news. American Colossus reports several theories about Tilden's sexuality, including possible asexuality, (Note: Hornblum reports that Tilden's tennis protégés attested that he never made advances to them and was "the model of decorum" and that some of Tilden's friends thought he had no interest in sex at all.) hero syndrome, or being "deep in the closet", in Hornblum's words. Tilden defended himself to the public afterward but was ostracized, both generally and in the tennis community. Tilden was written out of history, and he died in obscurity when he was sixty years old.

== Reception ==
The Library Journal recommended American Colossus to "people involved in the business of sport and the role of the NCAA". The Telegraph called the book "excellent". The Northeast Times wrote that American Colossus "captures the athlete's life with bountiful zeal" and that its narrations of tennis games "move with the intensity of a ball slicing across the court". The Times Literary Supplement praised American Colossus as "diligently researched" but thought the match reports were "wearying" and that in the book Tilden "himself remains in shadow". According to the Northeast Times, "Hornblum never attempts to defend Tilden’s actions in his personal life".

By June 2018, the Northeast Times reported that Hornblum's campaign to establish a plaque commemorating Tilden in Philadelphia had turned out unsuccessfully. In April 2019, Hornblum gave a speech about American Colossus at the Cynwyd Club, a Philadelphia sports club for tennis.
