= Gene Scott (tennis) =

American tennis player, tournament director, author, and publisher

- Full name: Eugene Lytton Scott
- Country (sports): United States
- Born: December 28, 1937 New York, U.S.
- Died: March 20, 2006 (aged 68) Rochester, Minnesota, U.S.
- Height: 6 ft 1 in (1.85 m)
- Turned pro: 1968 (amateur tour from 1951)
- Retired: 1975
- Plays: Right-handed
- College: Yale University (BA); University of Virginia School of Law (JD)
- Int. Tennis HoF: 2008 (member page)

Singles
- Career record: 322-220
- Career titles: 16
- Highest ranking: No. 7 (1965, World's Top 20)

Grand Slam singles results
- Australian Open: 2R (1964)
- French Open: QF (1964)
- Wimbledon: 3R (1964, 1965)
- US Open: SF (1967)

Doubles
- Career record: 12–22

Grand Slam doubles results
- Australian Open: 2R (1964)

Eugene Lytton Scott (December 28, 1937 – March 20, 2006) was an American tennis player, tournament director, author, and publisher. His active tennis career lasted from the 1950s to mid-1970s. Scott's highest U.S. ranking as an amateur was No. 4 in 1963, and he reached as high as World No. 7 in 1967.

== Early years and education ==
Gene Scott was born in New York City to Meredith Sullivan and Lytton Scott. He was the maternal grandson of Dr. Eugene C. Sullivan, one of the inventors of Pyrex heat-resistant glass and chair and president of Corning Glass Works. Raised in St. James on Long Island, Scott attended St. Mark's School in Southborough, Massachusetts, where he was a multi-sport varsity athlete playing track, hockey, soccer, and tennis before graduating in June 1956.

He graduated with a BA in history from Yale University in 1960, where he was a member of Skull and Bones and lettered in tennis, ice hockey, soccer, and lacrosse. He subsequently earned a law degree from the University of Virginia School of Law in 1964. After passing the bar, he practiced law as an attorney at the Wall Street law firm of Burke & Burke, while simultaneously playing on the international tennis circuit.

== Tennis career ==
Scott's highest U.S. ranking as an amateur was No. 4 in 1963, and he reached as high as World No. 7 in 1967. At the time, he was a member of the United States Davis Cup team, and was both teammate and roommate of Arthur Ashe. They remained friends, and with Charlie Pasarell and Sheridan Snyder, founded the National Junior Tennis League in 1969. He founded the magazine Tennis Week in May 1974.

In 1963, he won the singles title at the Eastern Grass Court Championships in South Orange after a straight-sets victory in the final against compatriot Marty Riessen.

Scott made it to the quarterfinals of the 1964 French Championships in singles, defeating Ron McKenzie, Antonio Palafox, and then Marty Mulligan in a close five sets, but losing the quarterfinal to eventual finalist Pierre Darmon. Scott won the Southampton Invitation (Long Island) at the Meadow Club, defeating Michael Sangster, Dennis Ralston, and Charlie Pasarell in long close matches.

In 1967 Scott won the Eastern Indoor Championships at Waldwick, N.J. defeating Frank Froehling in the final in three straight sets. That same season he won the Long Island Championships at Great Neck, N.Y. defeating Dick Stockton and Peter Fishbach. At the 1967 U.S. National Championships Scott defeated Tom Gorman, Ron Holmberg in a close five sets, and Owen Davidson in the quarterfinal. In the semifinal he lost to the eventual champion John Newcombe.

Later, Scott remained among the best players in the world in his age group. He won the USTA Men's 65 Clay Court Championships held at New Orleans Lawn Tennis Club in 2002. He won the USTA Men's 65 Grass Court Championships in September 2004 and the International Tennis Federation's Men's Super-Seniors World Individual Championships in the 65 division a week later. Scott also played real tennis at New York City's Racquet and Tennis Club.

Scott grew up in St. James, New York and played varsity hockey, track, soccer, and tennis at St. Mark's School in Southborough, Massachusetts.

Scott competed in the Davis Cup in 1963 and 1965, and his 1963 singles and doubles victories helped the United States win the Cup that year.

Although Scott remained active as a court tennis player, which he played at The Racquet Club on Park Avenue, he became one of the major figures in American tennis through his publication Tennis Week, which he founded, published, and edited. His editorials—perceptive, authoritative and sometimes whimsical—were considered a must read for all the game's insiders as well as a tennis public who became educated about the game as a result of reading them.

He was a mentor on and off court to Vitas Gerulaitis. Scott ran tournaments in New York and New Jersey for many years before taking over as tournament director of the ATP Masters at Madison Square Garden. In 1990, he was asked to start up the Kremlin Cup, an ATP event in Moscow, with a remit to produce with $1 million in sponsorship in nine months. With some assistance from the Kremlin, when Boris Yeltsin became president of Russia, Scott came up with Bayer as his first title sponsor and the tournament, played inside the vast Olympic Arena, immediately drew some of the largest crowds on the ATP tour.

In 1987, Scott joined the board of directors of the USA based China Tennis Foundation in America, Inc. (CFTA Inc.). He was instrumental in helping the People's Republic of China start to consider world championship tennis tournaments. He traveled to China and met with the Davis Cup players, and government officials that loved playing tennis including then the Vice Premiere Wan Li. (Other top officials involved included Li Peng, General Lu Zheng, Hu Qili and Deputy Mayor of Beijing Zhang Bei Fa.) Scott was joined by Oto Merunka, a former Czechoslovak Davis Cup tennis player that had played tennis in China many years before, and worked for the CFTA Inc. and resided in the US. The founder of CFTA, Inc. an Asian-American, perky female who was the daughter of Hong Kong's L.K. Lau from the Golden Harvest films that produced some of the Bruce Lee martial arts films. During this time, China was just known internationally for table tennis, not tennis, and Scott helped to provide a how-to international tourney infrastructure guide to build on in order to create a more dominant international tennis scene in China.

== Death and legacy ==
Scott died of amyloidosis at the age of 68. He was elected to the International Tennis Hall of Fame (ITHF) in 2008 in the "contributor" category. Since 2006, the ITHF annually presents the Eugene L. Scott Award to an individual who "embodies Scott's commitment to communicating honestly and critically about the game, and who has had a significant impact on the tennis world."

== Tennis career statistics ==
=== Grand Slam tournament performance timeline ===
Scott competed on the international circuit from the amateur era through the first half of the Open Era. His career-best Grand Slam performance came at the 1967 U.S. National Championships, where he reached the semifinals before falling to eventual champion John Newcombe.

Tournament	1960	1961	1962	1963	1964	1965	1966	1967	1968	1969	1970	1971	1972	1973	1974	1975	SR
Australian Championships	A	A	A	A	2R	A	A	A	A	A	A	A	A	A	A	A	0 / 1
French Championships	A	A	A	A	QF	A	A	A	A	A	A	A	A	A	A	A	0 / 1
Wimbledon	A	A	A	A	3R	3R	A	A	A	A	A	A	A	A	A	A	0 / 2
U.S. National Championships	3R	3R	2R	3R	3R	3R	A	SF	1R	1R	A	1R	2R	1R	A	1R	0 / 13
Win–loss	2–1	2–1	1–1	2–1	8–4	4–2	0–0	5–1	0–1	0–1	0–0	0–1	1–1	0–1	0–0	0–1	0 / 17

=== Career tournament finals ===
In his career, Scott won 16 singles titles across amateur and professional draws. Among them were his titles on grass and indoor circuits across the Northeastern United States.

Result	Year	Tournament	Surface	Opponent	Score
Win	1963	Eastern Grass Court Championships (South Orange)	Grass	(United States) Marty Riessen	6–1, 6–3, 6–4
Win	1964	Southampton Invitation (Long Island)	Grass	(United States) Dennis Ralston	6–4, 3–6, 3–6, 11–9, 8–6
Win	1967	Eastern Indoor Championships (Waldwick)	Indoor	(United States) Frank Froehling	6–3, 6–4, 6–2
Win	1967	Long Island Championships (Great Neck)	Outdoor	(United States) Dick Stockton	6–2, 8–6
