= Julius Seligson =

American tennis player

Julius "Julie" Seligson
- Country (sports): United States
- Born: December 22, 1909 New York City, NY, US
- Died: October 13, 1987 (aged 77) Westport, Connecticut, US
- Turned pro: 1926 (amateur circuit)
- Retired: 1939
- College: Lehigh University

Singles
- Career titles: 10
- Highest ranking: No. 8 in USTA Singles (1928)

Grand Slam singles results
- US Open: 4R (1929)

Julius "Julie" Seligson (December 22, 1909, in New York City – October 13, 1987) was an American tennis player in the early part of the 20th century.

Seligson was ranked as high as # 8 in USTA Singles in 1928. In 1928 he won the NCAA Men's Tennis Championship in singles. He was inducted into the Intercollegiate Tennis Association (ITA) Men’s Collegiate Tennis Hall of Fame.

== Early and personal life ==
Seligson was born in New York City, New York, and was Jewish, and experienced anti-Semitism in tennis. He attended Columbia Grammar & Preparatory School.

In 1937 he married Gertrude "Gerry" Seligson (nee Goodman). They lived in Westport, Connecticut, from 1948 on.

== Tennis career ==
As a junior he was the national boy's 18-and-under champion in 1925 and 1926. In 1927 he won the Eastern Grass Court Championships.

He played collegiate tennis at Lehigh University in Pennsylvania, from which he graduated in 1930. Seligson never lost a regular season match. In 1928 he won the NCAA Men's Tennis Championship in singles, beating Ben Gorchakoff 6–1, 6–1, 6–1, to become Lehigh’s first individual national champion. He won 66 straight matches, before losing in the 1930 NCAA finals 6–3, 3–6, 6–2, 8–6 to Cliff Sutter of Tulane.

He won the NCAA indoor singles championship in 1928, 1929, and 1930. Seligson won the inaugural edition of the Eastern Grass Court Championships in 1927 at the Westchester Country Club in Rye, N.Y. That same season he was runner-up at the inaugural Eastern Clay Court Championships at the Jackson Heights Tennis Club in Queens, N.Y. and also won the Kings County Championships in Brooklyn.

In 1928, 1930, and 1932 he won the New York Metropolitan Clay Court Championships. Seligson also won the Metropolitan Grass Court Championships in 1928 defeating Berkeley Bell in the final in four sets. In 1928 and 1930, he was a singles finalist at the U.S. National Indoor Tennis Championships. In 1929, at the Cincinnati Masters, he reached the singles final, where he lost to Herbert Bowman in four sets: 6–2, 4–6, 4–6, 1–6. Seligson was ranked as high as # 8 in USTA Singles in 1928.

=== Halls of Fame ===
In 1992, he was inducted into the Lehigh University Athletic Hall of Fame, and in 2002 he was enshrined into the Intercollegiate Tennis Association (ITA) Men’s Collegiate Tennis Hall of Fame.

== After tennis career ==
After graduation he became an insurance broker.

Seligson died in 1987 of a melanoma at his home in Westport, Connecticut. He was 77 years old.

== See also ==
- List of select Jewish tennis players
