= Harris Coggeshall =

American tennis player (1907–1993)

Harris Coggeshall (September 23, 1907 – June 26, 1993) was an American tennis player in the 1920s and 1930s.

== Biography ==
Coggeshall was born September 23, 1907, in Des Moines, Iowa. He graduated from the Harvard law school and practiced law in Des Moines. He served as chairman of the civil service commission for both the city and the state of Iowa, and as city solicitor for Des Moines. Coggeshall died June 26, 1993.

== Tennis career ==
He played collegiate tennis at Grinnell College in Iowa. In 1929, he won the Central Intercollegiate title (at Chicago) and reached the finals of the Eastern Intercollegiate championships (at Brooklyn, New York). He also played on the basketball team at Grinnell.

Coggeshall was a runner-up in doubles at both the National Clay Court Championships in 1930 and the National Indoor Championship in 1929.

At the Cincinnati Open, he reached the singles final in 1928 before falling to top-seeded Emmett Paré, 6–2, 1–6, 4–6, 4–6.

In 1931, Coggeshall won the Western Tennis Championship by defeating future Canadian Tennis Hall of Fame enshrinee Marcel Rainville, 3–6, 7–5, 6–1, 6–3, in the final. Also that year, he won the Iowa State Championship, and was a finalist at the Michigan State Championship.

According to Coggeshall, during his career he had wins over future International Tennis Hall of Fame enshrinees Ellsworth Vines, Bryan "Bitsy" Grant, Frank Parker and John Doeg, and well as such U.S. top-tenners as Berkeley Bell, Bruce Barnes and Wilbur "Junior" Coen.

He was elected to the Iowa Sports Hall of Fame in 1959, and is commonly considered by the general public as the second best tennis player ever to emanate from that state.
