= Kingdon Van Nostrand =

American tennis player

Kingdon "King" Van Nostrand (born June 4, 1934) is an American tennis player and coach. In 2022 he became the leader in seniors tennis competition by winning a 43rd world title.

== Early life ==
King Van Nostrand was born in Bay Shore, New York, and attended Bay Shore public schools. He began playing tennis at age 3, following his older brother to tennis courts. Through age 15 he played USTA Eastern section junior tournaments. In high school he played tennis and basketball, winning several Long Island tennis championships, 1949–1951. He attended New York State Teachers College, Cortland (later called SUNY Cortland), where he also played tennis and basketball, and obtained a degree in elementary education. After four years in the Navy he returned to Bay Shore High School as a mathematics teacher from 1960 to 1989. He coached junior varsity high school tennis 1960–1979. During this time he had a stretch of 161 consecutive victories, and he was featured by Sports Illustrated for this feat. His overall record was 223 wins and four losses. While teaching and coaching, he continued to compete on a national and international level. In his brief experience in the open era of non-senior tennis, his most notable success was making the first round at the 1970 US National, the precursor to the US Open.

== Senior tennis ==
Close to his 35th birthday, a senior (age bracketed) tennis circuit started in 1968; also in 1968, the ban on professional tennis players was lifted. Van Nostrand took advantage of these changes and entered the world of senior tennis. By July 1970, he was ranked second nationally in the 35-and-over bracket in senior tennis; in 1970 he won his first USTA gold ball, signifying winning a national title. In 1979, he was noted to be one of the top players in the country, at the time not having lost since entering the 45 age level and having a 40 game winning streak. Described as a "young" senior, it was opined that the "wiry, red‐haired 6‐footer...runs like a deer, executes his shots with textbook precision and produces an all round fluency that is reminiscent of ballet dancer." By the early 1980s he was playing at the international level. In 1991 The New York Times noted that "he has remained at the top of his senior division almost every year." In 1995 he was described as being nearly invincible in American and international competitions, having won titles in 11 countries on five continents. From 2000 to 2023, he had a No.1 world ranking in six separate years. In 1998 he relocated to Vero Beach, Florida, to take advantage of year-round playing weather and soft clay courts for his knees; he has had two knee replacements bilaterally. From 2002 to 2014 he won 52 consecutive USTA singles tournaments, compiling a record of 189–0, with only one match going three sets. In 2016 he was awarded the ITF Seniors Award for Outstanding Achievement; as of 2020, there had been only four recipients of this award. He has represented the United States internationally in the Stevens Cup, Dubler Cup and Austria Cup. At the 2022 Super-Seniors World Individual Championships Van Nostrand, at age 87, achieved a long-held ambition, becoming the outright leader in seniors tennis. The late Lorne Main had won 42 world titles. Van Nostrand had been stuck on 41 titles when Covid hit and he had surgery for a ruptured tendon in his right arm; he missed two seasons. He was uncertain that he would ever play tennis again. He did three months of vigorous physical therapy and returned in time for 2022 championship events. Win 42 was in a team event won by the U.S. In the 85-and-over singles final at the 2022 Super-Seniors, he was down 1–6 in the super tiebreaker. He came back to win the tiebreaker 10-7 and win his record-breaking 43rd world title.

== Personal ==
Van Nostrand met his wife in college. He taught her tennis and she became a tennis instructor; as of 2022 they had been married 67 years. They had four children, all of whom played tennis in college; two were professional, John and Molly, both were coached by Van Nostrand Molly reached a Wimbledon quarterfinal in 1985, but her career was cut short because of a back injury. John died in a 1984 car accident in Mexico, on his way to a tournament, hoping to qualify for Wimbledon. His brother, Allan, coached the varsity team at Bay Shore. He accumulated over 400 wins during his career, including a winning streak of 175 games over nine years. Twelve members of the Van Nostrand family were inducted into the Suffolk Sports Hall of Fame in 1991; each was a player, coach or both. The family members included Kingdon, Allan, their wives and their eight children. In 2009 both he and his wife, Boots, won 75-and-over national singles championships; this was her first singles gold ball.

He is a member of the Suffolk County Sports Hall of Fame, the Cortland C-Club Hall of Fame, the Long Island Sports Hall of Fame, and the Eastern Tennis Association Hall of Fame.

Van Nostrand was featured in a 2023 documentary about super senior tennis players: Silver Servers directed by Dan Lobb.
