= Fritz Mercur =

American tennis player (1903–1961)

- Full name: Frederic Mercur
- Country (sports): United States
- Born: June 23, 1903 Williamsport, Pennsylvania, U.S.
- Died: September, 1961 (aged 58) Pennsylvania, U.S.
- Turned pro: 1921 (amateur tour)
- Retired: 1941

Singles
- Career record: 79-46
- Career titles: 16

Grand Slam singles results
- US Open: SF (1929)

Frederic 'Fritz' Mercur (June 23, 1903 – September 9, 1961) was an American tennis player, coach and insurance salesman. In a twenty-year tennis career, Mercur was an inconsistent performer, but at his best had a victory over Bill Tilden (at a tournament at Rye in 1928) to his name.

Mercur made his debut at the U. S. Championships in 1921 and lost in round one to that year's finalist Wallace F. Johnson. Mercur lost early at the U. S. championships in 1923, 1924, 1926, 1927 and 1928. In 1929, Mercur beat Wilmer Allison before losing to Frank Hunter in the semi-finals. In beating Allison (the champion in 1935), Mercur came to the net and beat Allison at his own game. Mercur lost early in 1930, 1932, 1935, 1936 and 1937.

Mercur won the New York State Championships in 1928 defeating Wilmer Allison in the final in three straight sets. The following season he won the Southampton Invitation on Long Island N.Y. for 1929 defeating John Doeg in the final in three straight sets. Also in 1929, Mercur won the Florida East Coast Championships defeating Allison in the final in a close five set match.

At the Cincinnati Open, Mercur reached the singles semifinals in 1932 (where he lost to George Lott), and the quarterfinals in 1933.

Mercur also was a tennis coach at Lehigh University. Born in Williamsport, Pennsylvania, he died in Bethlehem, Pennsylvania, after finishing a doubles match.
