= Bill Tilden =

American tennis player (1893–1953)

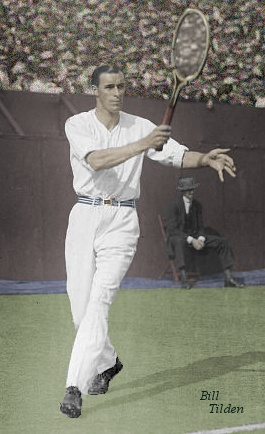
- Tilden in the 1920s
- Full name: William Tatem Tilden Jr.
- Country (sports): United States
- Born: February 10, 1893 Philadelphia, Pennsylvania, US
- Died: June 5, 1953 (aged 60) Los Angeles, California, US
- Height: 6 ft 1 1/2 in (1.87 m)
- Turned pro: 1931 (amateur from 1912)
- Retired: 1946
- Plays: Right-handed (one-handed backhand)
- Int. Tennis HoF: 1959 (member page)

Singles
- Career record: 1726–506 (77.3%)
- Career titles: 138
- Highest ranking: No. 1 (1920, A. Wallis Myers)

Grand Slam singles results
- French Open: F (1927, 1930)
- Wimbledon: W (1920, 1921, 1930)
- US Open: W (1920, 1921, 1922, 1923, 1924, 1925, 1929)

Other tournaments
- WHCC: W (1921)
- Professional majors
- US Pro: W (1931, 1935)
- Wembley Pro: F (1935, 1937)
- French Pro: W (1934)

Grand Slam doubles results
- Wimbledon: W (1927)
- US Open: W (1918, 1921, 1922, 1923, 1927)

Grand Slam mixed doubles results
- French Open: W (1930)
- US Open: W (1913, 1914, 1922, 1923)

Team competitions
- Davis Cup: W (1920, 1921, 1922, 1923, 1924, 1925, 1926)

William Tatem Tilden II (February 10, 1893 – June 5, 1953), nicknamed "Big Bill", was an American tennis player. He was the world No. 1 amateur for six consecutive years, from 1920 to 1925, and was ranked as the world No. 1 professional by Ray Bowers in 1931 and 1932 and Ellsworth Vines in 1933. Tilden won 14 Major singles titles, including 10 Grand Slam events, one World Hard Court Championships and three professional majors. He was the first American man to win Wimbledon, first claiming the title in 1920. He also won a joint-record seven U.S. Championships titles (shared with Richard Sears and Bill Larned).

Tilden dominated the world of international tennis in the first half of the 1920s, and during his 20-year amateur period from 1911 to 1930, won 138 of 192 tournaments he contested. He owns a number of all-time tennis achievements, including the career match-winning record and the career winning percentage at the U.S. Championships. At the 1929 U.S. National Championships, Tilden became the first player to reach ten finals at the same Grand Slam event. Tilden, who was frequently at odds with the rigid United States Lawn Tennis Association about his amateur status and income derived from newspaper articles, won his last Grand Slam event in 1930 at Wimbledon at the age of 37. He turned professional at the end of that year and toured with other professionals for the next 15 years.

== Personal life ==
William Tatem Tilden Jr. (Note: From birth he was known as William Tatem Tilden Jr. to distinguish him from his father, but he disliked being called "Junior", and preferred to be known as William Tilden II.) was born on February 10, 1893, in Germantown, Philadelphia into a wealthy family bereaved by the death of three older siblings. His father was William Tatem Tilden, a wool merchant and local politician; and his mother, Selina Hey, was a pianist. His semi-invalid mother, who suffered from Bright's disease, died when he was 18; and, even though his father was still alive and maintained a large house staffed with servants, Bill was sent a few houses away to live with a maiden aunt. The loss at 22 of his father and an older brother Herbert marked him deeply. After several months of deep depression and, with encouragement from his aunt, tennis, which he had taken up at age six or seven at the family summer house in the Catskill Mountains of Upstate New York, became his primary means of recovery. According to his biographer, Frank Deford, because of his early family losses, Tilden spent all of his adult life attempting to create a father-son relationship with a long succession of ball boys and youthful tennis protégés, of whom Vinnie Richards was the most noted. In spite of his worldwide travels, Tilden lived at his aunt's house until 1941, when he was 48 years old.

Tilden was initially home-schooled by his overprotective mother and a team of private tutors; but, in 1908, he went to Germantown Academy. In October 1910 he entered the University of Pennsylvania, where he joined Delta Kappa Epsilon, and enrolled at Peirce College but did not graduate.

== Early and amateur tennis career ==
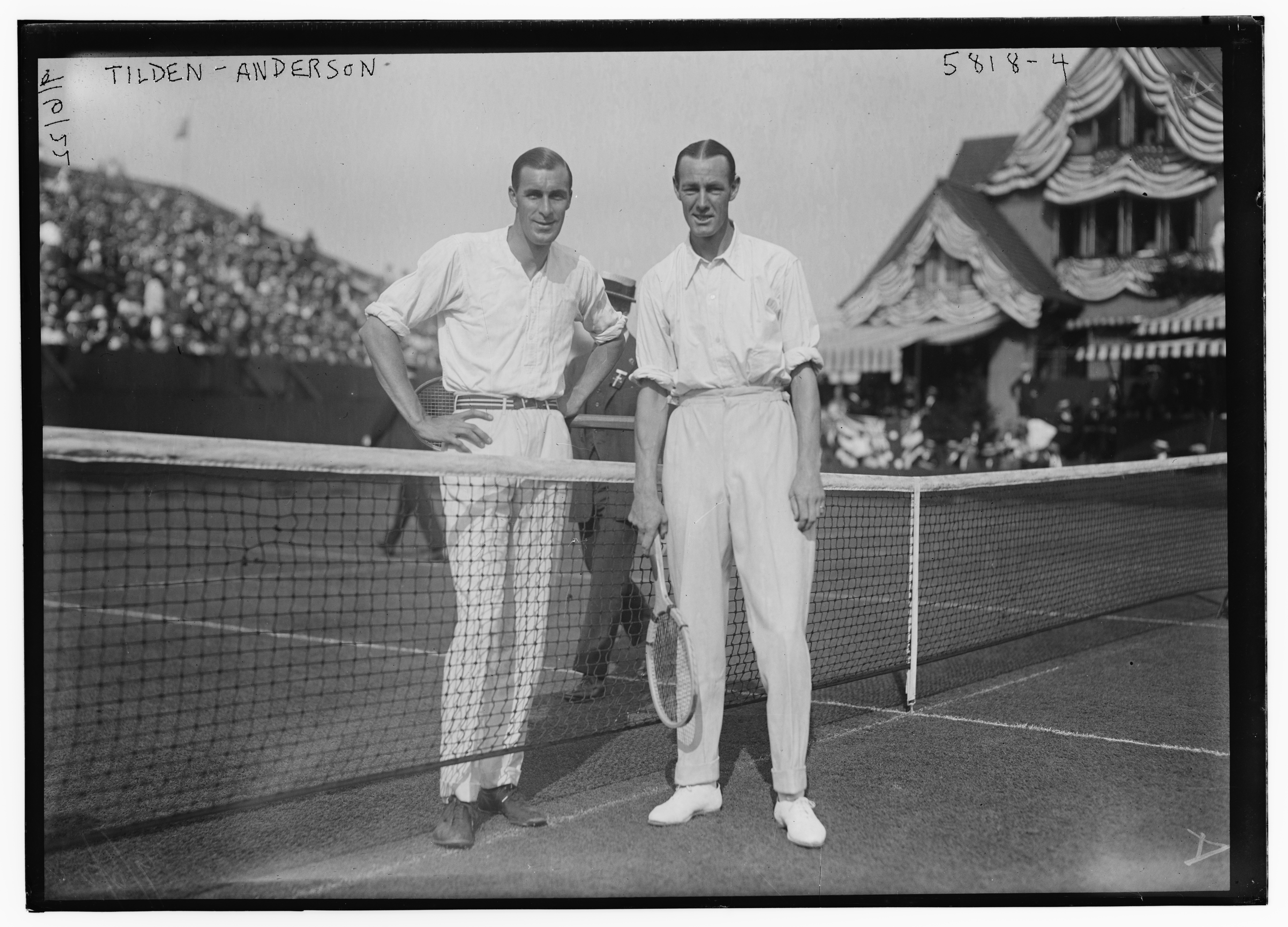
Tilden (left) with James Anderson at the 1922 International Lawn Tennis Challenge

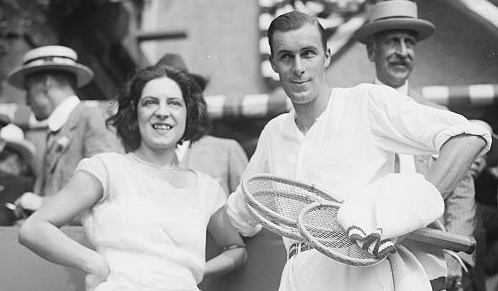
Suzanne Lenglen (1899–1938) and Bill Tilden (1893–1953)

Tilden went to the prep school Germantown Academy where he wasn't known for his tennis nor was he eventually good enough to play on his college team. The shy, self-absorbed, sometimes arrogant young man dropped out of the University of Pennsylvania and in 1910 began to practice his game against a backboard, and he also became a dedicated student of the game. The following year he won his first tournaments; the junior singles and doubles title of Germantown. In just three years, he worked his way up the ranks. His first national title was winning the mixed doubles championships with Mary Browne in 1913 and they successfully defended the title in 1914.

From 1914 to 1917, Tilden won the Philadelphia championship. Prior to 1920, he had won a number of Canadian doubles titles, but at the U.S. National Championships in 1918 and 1919 he lost the singles final to Robert Lindley Murray and "Little Bill" Johnston, respectively in straight sets. He won six consecutive U.S. singles championships from 1920 to 1925 and seven in total, making him the co-record holder with Richard Sears and Bill Larned. In the winter of 1919–1920, he moved to Rhode Island, where, on an indoor court, he devoted himself to remodeling his relatively ineffective backhand into a much more effective one. With this change, he became the world No. 1 tennis player and the first male American to win the Wimbledon singles championship. In the mid-1920s, Tilden came into conflict with the USLTA regarding alleged violations of the amateur rule, specifically relating to the monetary compensation he received for writing tennis articles.

In the late 1920s, the great French players known as the "Four Musketeers" finally wrested the Davis Cup away from Tilden and the United States, as well as his domination of the singles titles at Wimbledon and Forest Hills. In 1928, he won the men's singles in the Ojai Tennis Tournament. Tilden had long been at odds with the rigid amateur directors of the United States Lawn Tennis Association about his income derived from newspaper articles about tennis. He won his last major championship at Wimbledon in 1930 at the age of 37, but was no longer able to win titles at will.

== Professional tennis career ==
On December 31, 1930, in need of money, he turned professional and joined the fledgling pro tour, which had begun only in 1927. For the next 15 years, he and a handful of other professionals such as Hans Nüsslein and Karel Koželuh barnstormed across the United States and Europe in a series of one-night stands, with Tilden still the player that people primarily paid to see. Tilden beat Koželuh 50–17 on the 1931 tour. Even with greats such as Ellsworth Vines, Fred Perry, and Don Budge as his opponents, all of them current or recent world No. 1 players, it was often Tilden who ensured the box-office receipts—and who could still hold his own against the much younger players for a first set or even an occasional match. Tilden was ranked world No. 1 pro by Ray Bowers in 1931 and 1932 and Ellsworth Vines in 1933.

Tilden thought he reached the apogee of his whole career in 1934 at 41 years old; nevertheless, that year he was dominated in the pro ranks by Ellsworth Vines. American Lawn Tennis reported that Vines had an edge of 11–9 in the first phase of their tour from January 10 through February 16 and that Vines led Tilden by 19 matches after the second phase of their tour, played from March 21 through May 17. Tilden had won 17 times for the entire year, per an Associated Press report, so a probable win–loss record at tour's end was 36–17 in Vines' favor. Both players then met at least 6 times during the rest of the year (Ray Bowers has listed 5 tournament matches and 1 one-night program), all lost by Tilden.

In May 1931 he won the inaugural U.S. National Indoor Professional Championships, held at the Penn Athletic Club, Philadelphia against Vincent Richards. Later in July that year Tilden won his first U.S. Pro title, beating Vincent Richards in the final in straight sets at the Forest Hill Stadium in New York. Tilden also won the French Pro title in 1934. In 1935, he took his second US Pro title beating Kozeluh in the final. The same season he was beaten in the final of the Pacific Southwest Indoor Professional Championships in November by Lester Stoefen. By the late 1930s, Tilden was in his mid 40s and past his prime, but he was capable of playing excellent tennis in patches. Tilden lost easily to Don Budge in the 1941 World Series. Budge said of Tilden "Bill could invariably manage to keep things close for a while. It was seldom, however, that he could extend me to the end, and I swamped him on the whole tour".

In 1945, the 52-year-old Tilden and his long-time doubles partner Vinnie Richards won the professional doubles championship—they had won the United States amateur title 27 years earlier in 1918.

After playing the pro tournament circuit in 1946, the 53-year-old Tilden served a jail term. He returned to pro tennis briefly in 1948, playing a short series of matches against Wayne Sabin. Tilden's final farewell came in 1951. He faced George Lyttleton Rogers in a tour in April and May. Tilden lost in the quarterfinals to Frank Kovacs at the Cleveland tournament in June 1951. Tilden was 58 years old. It had been 35 years earlier, in 1916, that he had made his singles debut at the US (Amateur) championships.

=== Davis Cup coach ===
Tilden coached Germany's tennis team in the 1937 Davis Cup. In the inter-zone finals, the U.S. team won after the deciding singles clash between Gottfried von Cramm and Don Budge, a match which has been called "The Greatest Tennis Match Ever Played".

== Place in sports history ==
Tilden is considered by some to be the greatest tennis player of all time.

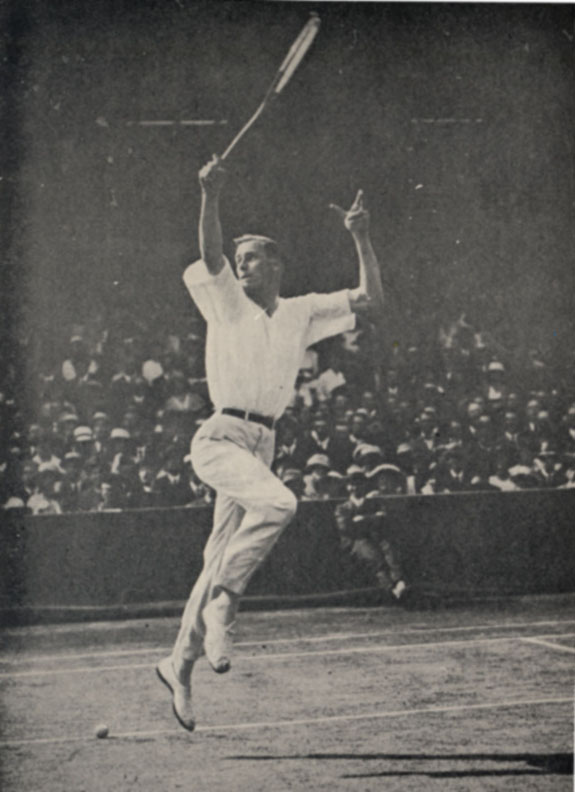
Bill Tilden in 1919

Allison Danzig, the main tennis writer for The New York Times from 1923 through 1968, and the editor of The Fireside Book of Tennis, called Tilden the greatest tennis player he had ever seen. "He could run like a deer," Danzig once told CBS Sports. An extended Danzig encomium to Tilden's tennis appears in the July 11, 1946 issue of The Times, in which he reports on a 1920s-evoking performance in the first two sets of a five-set loss by the 53-year-old Tilden to Wayne Sabin, at the 1946 Professional Championship at Forest Hills.

In 1975, Don Budge ranked his top five players of all time and rated Tilden number four behind Vines, Kramer and Perry.

In his 1979 autobiography, Jack Kramer, the long-time tennis promoter and great player, included Tilden in his list of the six greatest players of all time. (Note: Writing in 1979, Kramer considered the best ever to have been either Don Budge (for consistent play) or Ellsworth Vines (at the height of his game). The next four best were, chronologically, Tilden, Fred Perry, Bobby Riggs, and Pancho Gonzales. After these six came the "second echelon" of Rod Laver, Lew Hoad, Ken Rosewall, Gottfried von Cramm, Ted Schroeder, Jack Crawford, Pancho Segura, Frank Sedgman, Tony Trabert, John Newcombe, Arthur Ashe, Stan Smith, Björn Borg, and Jimmy Connors. He felt unable to rank Henri Cochet and René Lacoste accurately, but felt they were among the very best.) Kramer began playing tennis with Tilden at age 15 at the Los Angeles Tennis Club (LATC).

In 1983, Fred Perry ranked the greatest male players of all time and put them in to two categories, before World War 2 and after. Perry ranked Tilden number one in the pre-World War 2 list.

In the early years of the 21st century, Sidney Wood compiled his list of the Greatest Players of All Time (later published posthumously in a memoir "The Wimbledon final that never was and other tennis tales from a bygone era"). Wood first entered Wimbledon in 1927 and won the title in 1931. "From that time on, through to the late 1970s (doubles only towards the end), I was privileged to compete against virtually every top player in the world" said Wood. Wood ranked Tilden number three, behind Budge and Kramer.

Tilden was one of the most famous athletes in the world for many years. During his lifetime he was a flamboyant character who was never out of the public eye, acting in both movies and plays, as well as playing tennis. He also had two arrests for sexual misconduct with teenage boys in the late 1940s; these led to incarcerations in the Los Angeles area. After his convictions he was shunned in public. Philadelphia's Germantown Cricket Club, his home court, revoked his membership and took down his portrait. Tilden's criminal record has cast a long shadow: in March 2016, a proposal to honor him with a historical marker at the club was voted down by the state of Pennsylvania panel charged with evaluating nominations. In 1950, in spite of his legal record and public disgrace, an Associated Press poll named Tilden the greatest tennis player of the half-century by a wider margin than that given to any athlete in any other sport (310 out of 391 votes). He was inducted into the International Tennis Hall of Fame in 1959.

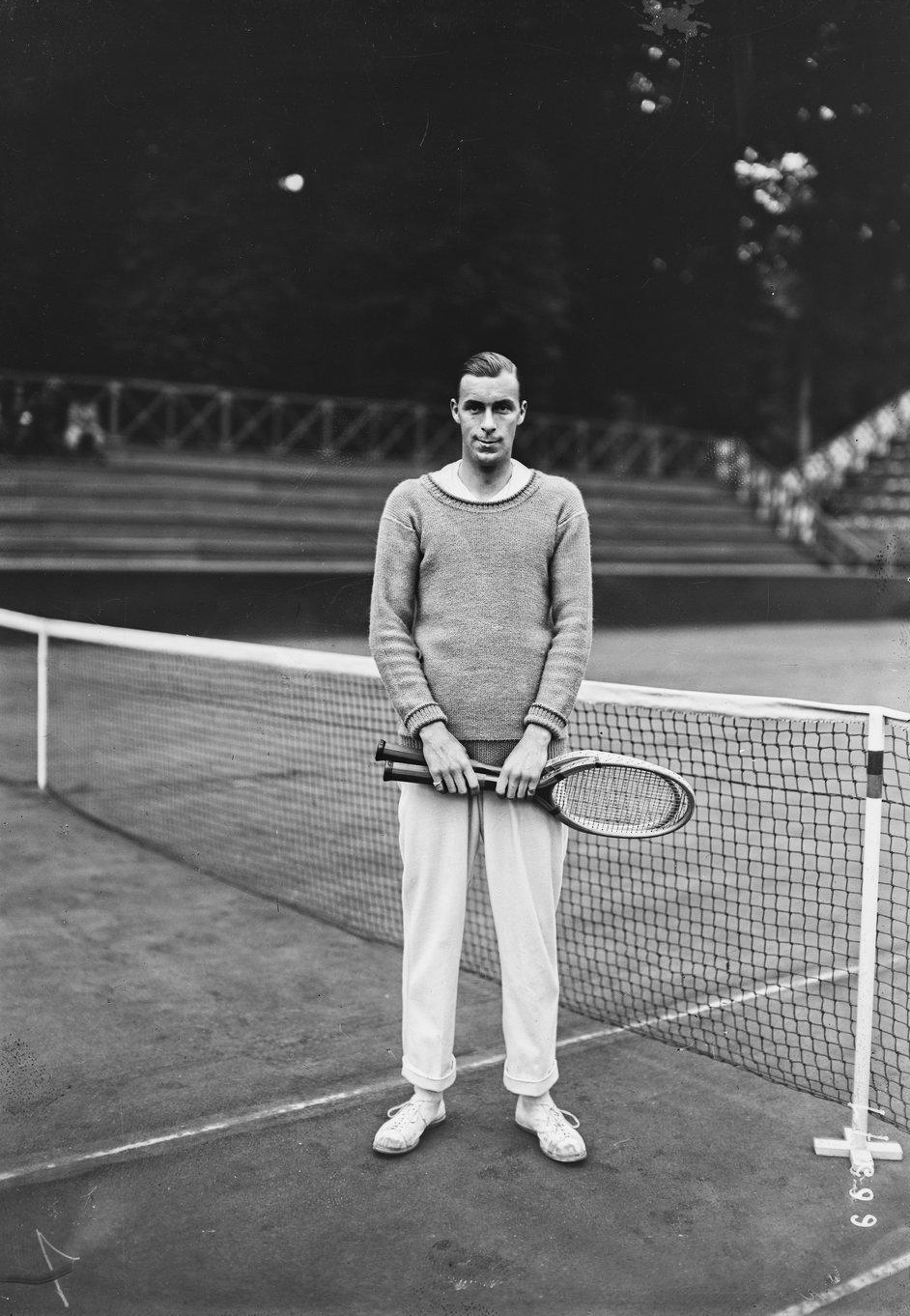
Bill Tilden at the 1921 World Hard Court Championships in Paris

In the United States' sports-mad decade of the Roaring Twenties, Tilden was one of the six dominant figures in the "Golden Age of Sport", along with Babe Ruth, Howie Morenz, Red Grange, Bobby Jones, and Jack Dempsey.

== Sexuality and morals charges ==
Tilden was arrested in November 1946 on Sunset Boulevard by the Beverly Hills police and charged with a misdemeanor ("contributing to the delinquency of a minor") for soliciting an underage boy, a 14-year-old boy with whom he was having sex in a moving vehicle. He was sentenced to a year in prison, but served 7 1/2 months. His five-year parole conditions were so strict they virtually erased all his income from private lessons. He was arrested again in January 1949 after picking up a 16-year-old hitchhiker who remained anonymous until years later when he filed a lawsuit claiming he had suffered severe mental, physical, and emotional damage from the encounter. The judge sentenced Tilden to a year on probation violation and let the punishment for the charge run concurrently. Tilden served 10 months.

In both cases, he apparently sincerely believed that his celebrity and his longtime friendship with Hollywood names such as Charlie Chaplin were enough to keep him from jail. After his incarceration, he was increasingly shunned by the tennis and Hollywood world. He was unable to give lessons at most clubs and even on public courts, he had fewer clients. At one point, he was invited to play at a prestigious professional tournament being held at the Beverly Wilshire Hotel; at the last moment, he was told that he could not participate. Chaplin allowed Tilden to use his private court for lessons to help him after the run of legal and financial problems.

According to contemporary George Lott, a player and later tennis coach at DePaul University, and authoritative biographer Frank Deford, Tilden never made advances to players, whether other adults or his pupils. Art Anderson of Burbank, who took lessons from Tilden from the age of 11 and remained a lifelong loyal friend, reported that Tilden never made advances toward him. "Bill had all the rumors floating around about his sexuality," Jack Kramer said.

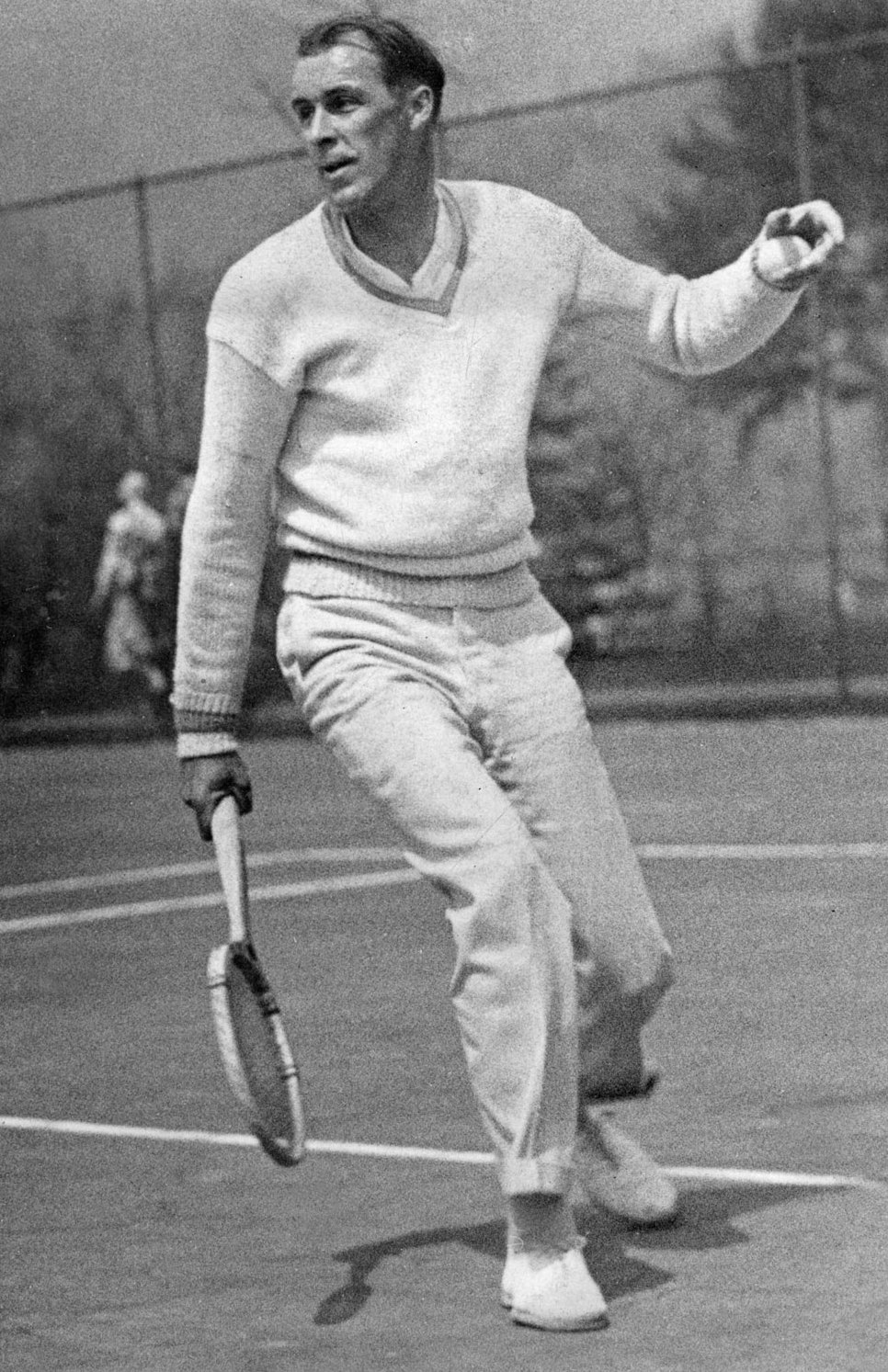
Tilden in the 1920s

== Death ==
Tilden had been born to wealth, and he earned large sums of money during his long career, particularly in his early years on the pro tour; he spent it lavishly, keeping a suite at the Algonquin Hotel in New York City. Much of his income went toward financing Broadway shows that he wrote, produced, and starred in. The latter part of his life was spent quietly and away from his family, occasionally participating in celebrity tennis matches. He was preparing to leave for the United States Professional Championship tournament in Cleveland, Ohio in 1953 when he died from heart complications at age 60. Tilden is buried in Ivy Hill Cemetery in Philadelphia.

Tilden was inducted into the International Tennis Hall of Fame in Newport, Rhode Island in 1959.

== Career statistics ==
Bud Collins states that, as an amateur (1912–1930), Tilden won 138 of 192 tournaments, lost 28 finals and had a 907–62 match record, a 93.6% winning percentage. Although he never played at the Australian Championships, Tilden was the first male tennis player to win four consecutive Grand Slam titles. In 1921, the Australian Championships were held after the U.S. National Championships. He joined professional tennis in 1931, making him then ineligible to compete in Grand Slam tournaments. He owns a number of all-time tennis achievements, including an amateur career match-winning record of 93.6%.

Tilden's career winning percentage at the US National Championships was 90.7%, which ranks him first ahead of Roger Federer, Fred Perry and Pete Sampras, and also a 42-match win streak from 1920 to 1926 is ahead of Roger Federer and Ivan Lendl. His 95-match winning streak from 1924 to 1925 is ahead of Don Budge and Roy Emerson, and his best win–loss single season coming in 1925 at 98.73%, 78–1, places him ahead of John McEnroe and Jimmy Connors. He, Roger Federer, Rafael Nadal and Novak Djokovic are the only players to reach 10 finals at a single Grand Slam event. At the Wimbledon Championships, he recorded a career 91.2% match record, ranking him 3rd all-time behind Björn Borg and Don Budge.

=== Performance timeline ===
Key
W	F	SF	QF	#R	RR	Q#	DNQ	A	NH

(W) winner; (F) finalist; (SF) semifinalist; (QF) quarterfinalist; (#R) rounds 4, 3, 2, 1; (RR) round-robin stage; (Q#) qualification round; (DNQ) did not qualify; (A) absent; (NH) not held; (SR) strike rate (events won / competed); (W–L) win–loss record.

Events with a challenge round: (W_{C}) won; (CR) lost the challenge round; (F_{A}) all comers' finalist.

																							SR	W–L	Win %
Grand Slam tournaments	Amateur career																						10 / 23	114–13	89.76
Grand Slam tournaments	1910	1911	1912	1913	1914	1915	1916	1917	1918	1919	1920	1921	1922	1923	1924	1925	1926	1927	1928	1929	1930		10 / 23	114–13	89.76
Australian	A	A	A	A	A	A	Not held			A	A	A	A	A	A	A	A	A	A	A	A		0 / 0	0–0	N/A
French	Only for French players					Not held					Only for French players					A	A	F	A	SF	F		0 / 3	14–3	82.35
Wimbledon	A	A	A	A	A	Not held				A	W_{C}	W_{C}	A	A	A	A	A	SF	SF	SF	W		3 / 6	31–3	91.18
U.S.	A	A	A	A	A	A	1R	3R	F	F	W	W	W	W	W	W	QF	F	A	W	SF		7 / 14	69–7	90.79
Pro Slam tournaments	Professional career																						3 / 19	37–18	67.27
Pro Slam tournaments	1931	1932	1933	1934	1935	1936	1937	1938	1939	1940	1941	1942	1943	1944	1945	1946	1947	1948	1949	1950	1951		3 / 19	37–18	67.27
U.S. Pro	W	SF	A	A	W	A	A	A	SF	SF	QF	A	QF	NH	SF	1R	A	A	A	A	QF	A	2 / 10	19–8	70.37
French Pro	A	A	NH	W	SF	A	SF	F	SF	Not held													1 / 5	10–4	71.43
Wembley Pro	Not held			3rd	F	NH	F	NH	3rd	Not held									A	A	A		0 / 4	8–6	57.14
Total:																							13 / 42	151–31	82.97

== Records ==
=== All-time records ===
Tournament	Since	Record accomplished	Players matched	Ref.
Grand Slam	1877	51 consecutive match wins, all Majors (1920–26)	Stands alone	
Grand Slam	1877	42 match win streak at a single Grand Slam tournament US Champs (1920–26)	Stands alone	
U.S. Championships	1881	7 titles overall	Richard Sears; William Larned	
U.S. Championships	1881	10 finals overall	Novak Djokovic	
U.S. Championships	1881	8 consecutive finals (1918–25)	Ivan Lendl	
U.S. Championships	1881	91.02% (71–7) match win percentage overall	Stands alone	
U.S. Championships	1881	42 match win streak (1920–26)	Stands alone	
U.S. Championships	1881	16 combined singles, doubles, mixed doubles titles overall (1913–29)	Stands alone	
All tournaments	1877	98 career match win streak (1924–25)	Stands alone	
All tournaments	1877	(71–1) single season match streak (1925)	Stands alone	
All tournaments	1877	19 consecutive titles won (1924–25)	Anthony Wilding	
All tournaments	1877	52 consecutive finals reached (1922–26)	Stands alone	
All tournaments	1877	Most appearances in a final of the Davis Cup: 11 with a record of 21–7 in singles (1920–30)	Stands alone	
All tournaments	1877	43 consecutive clay court finals reached (1922–29)	Stands alone	
All tournaments	1877	23 consecutive grass court finals reached (1921–26)	Stands alone	
All tournaments	1877	88.29% (445–49) grass court match winning percentage	Stands alone	
All tournaments	1877	479 career bagels scored	Stands alone	
All tournaments	1877	106 career double bagels scored	Stands alone	
All tournaments	1877	11 career triple bagels scored	Stands alone	
All tournaments	1877	10 consecutive years with a match winning percentage of 90%+ (1918–1927)	Stands alone	
All tournaments	1877	11 years overall with a match winning percentage of 90%+ (1918–1930)	Stands alone	
All tournaments	1877	16 years overall with a match winning percentage of 80%+ (1914–1933)	Stands alone	

== See also ==
- List of male tennis players
- Tennis male players statistics
- All-time tennis records – men's singles

== Sources ==
- Collins, Bud (2016). The Bud Collins History of Tennis (3rd ed.). New York: New Chapter Press. ISBN 978-1-937559-38-0.
- Deford, Frank (1976). Big Bill Tilden: The Triumphs and the Tragedy. New York: Simon & Schuster. ISBN 9780671222543.
- Digby Baltzell, E. (1995). Sporting Gentlemen – Men's Tennis from the Age of Honor to the Cult of Superstar. New York: The Free Press. ISBN 9780029013151. OCLC 31411547.
- Fisher, Marshall Jon (2010) A Terrible Splendor: Three Extraordinary Men, a World Poised for War, and the Greatest Tennis Match Ever Played. New York: Random House. ISBN 9780307393951
- Hornblum, Allen M. (2018). American Colossus: Big Bill Tilden and the Creation of Modern Tennis. Lincoln and London: University of Nebraska Press. ISBN 9780803288119.
- Gonzales, Pancho with Cy Rice (1959). Man with a Racket. New York: A.S. Barnes and Company. OCLC 1351057.
- Hofler, Robert (2006) The Man Who Invented Rock Hudson: The Pretty Boys and Dirty Deals of Henry Willson. New York: Carroll & Graf. ISBN 9780786718023
- Kashner, Sam and Macnair, Jennifer (2003) The Bad and the Beautiful: Hollywood in the Fifties. New York: W. W. Norton & Company. ISBN 9780393324365
- Kramer, Jack with Frank Deford (1981). The Game : My 40 Years in Tennis. London: Deutsch. ISBN 0233973079. OCLC 59152557. OL 17315708M.
- Milton, Joyce (1998) Tramp: The Life of Charlie Chaplin New York: Da Capo Press. ISBN 9780306808319
- Mulloy, Gardner (2009) As It Was. Flexigroup. ISBN 9780615327457
- Riggs, Bobby (1949) Tennis is my Racket. Stanley Paul & Co.
- Seebohm, Caroline (2009) Little Pancho: The Life of Tennis Legend Pancho Segura. Lincoln, Nebraska: University of Nebraska Press. ISBN 9780803220416
- Skeen, Dick (1976) Tennis Champions are Made, not Born. Cal-Pacific Color.
