= Tennis pro tours and tournament ranking series =

For many years before the Open Era of tennis in 1968, the usual format for the handful of touring tennis professionals was a series of two-man one-night stands across the United States and often in other countries as well. The most notable of these tours were the "World Series" or "World Professional Championships", in which the reigning world champion went head-to-head against a challenger, most often the leading amateur of the previous year who had just turned pro. Promoters would attempt to sign the leading amateur to a contract with a minimum guarantee against a percentage of gate receipts, making a similar type of deal with the reigning professional champion and sometimes giving smaller percentages to undercard players. The winners of the tours were described as being the "world champion".

After World War II, with an increasing number of prominent professional players, there were occasionally tournament series with point systems which created official rankings for the complete field of pros. The tournament ranking series were held in 1946, 1959 and 1960 and there were also World Championship tours in these same three years involving only a few pros. The last World Championship two-man tour was held in 1963, featuring a final set of matches of Ken Rosewall against Rod Laver. From 1964 until 1967, a tournament series with a point system determined the pro No. 1 player. Some shorter two-man or four-man tours continued to be held from 1964 onward, as there had been since the late 1920s, but without a world title at stake.

== World Championship tours ==
* Partial or incomplete result.

Date	Pro tour	Standings	Head-to-head results		Ref.
1928 Aug 25–Dec 7	World tour	Principals: 1. (Czechoslovakia) Karel Koželuh; 2. (United States) Vincent Richards; Secondaries: (United States) Howard Kinsey; (United States) Harvey Snodgrass	Koželuh–Richards	15–4	
1931 Feb 18–Aug 16	North America tour (Note: Jack Curley promoter.)	Principals: 1. (United States) Bill Tilden; 2. (Czechoslovakia) Karel Koželuh; Secondaries: (United States) Francis Hunter; (United States) Emmett Paré; (Republic of Ireland) Albert Burke; (United States) Bobby Seller; (United States) Bruce Barnes	Tilden–Koželuh	50–17	
1932 Jan 4–Jul 10	U.S. tour (Note: Tilden Tennis Tours, inc.)	Principals: 1. (United States) Bill Tilden; 2. (Germany) Hans Nüsslein; Secondaries: (United States) Francis Hunter; (United States) Vincent Richards; (Republic of Ireland) Albert Burke; (Germany) Roman Najuch; (United States) Bruce Barnes; (United States) Emmett Paré; (Czechoslovakia) Karel Koželuh	Tilden–Nüsslein	100–50	
1933 Jan–May	North America tour (Note: Tilden Tennis Tours, inc.)	Principals: 1. (United States) Bill Tilden; 2. (Germany) Hans Nüsslein; Secondaries: (United States) Francis Hunter; (United States) Bruce Barnes; (United States) Emmett Paré	Tilden–Nüsslein	56–22	
1934 Jan 10–May 13	U.S. tour	Principals: 1. (United States) Ellsworth Vines; 2. (United States) Bill Tilden; Secondaries: (United States) Bruce Barnes; (United States) Vincent Richards; (United States) Keith Gledhill; (United States) Alfred Chapin	Vines–Tilden	38–19	
1935 Jan 9–Apr 29	North America tour (Note: Bill O'Brien promoter.)	1. (United States) Ellsworth Vines; 2. (Germany) Hans Nüsslein; 3. (United States) Bill Tilden or (United States) George Lott or (United States) Les Stoefen	Vines–Stoefen	25–1	
1935 Jan 9–Apr 29	North America tour	1. (United States) Ellsworth Vines; 2. (Germany) Hans Nüsslein; 3. (United States) Bill Tilden or (United States) George Lott or (United States) Les Stoefen	Vines–Nüsslein	75%–25+%*	
1935 Jan 9–Apr 29	North America tour	1. (United States) Ellsworth Vines; 2. (Germany) Hans Nüsslein; 3. (United States) Bill Tilden or (United States) George Lott or (United States) Les Stoefen	Vines–Tilden	9–3	
1935 Jan 9–Apr 29	North America tour	1. (United States) Ellsworth Vines; 2. (Germany) Hans Nüsslein; 3. (United States) Bill Tilden or (United States) George Lott or (United States) Les Stoefen	Vines–Lott	2–0	
1935 Jan 9–Apr 29	North America tour	1. (United States) Ellsworth Vines; 2. (Germany) Hans Nüsslein; 3. (United States) Bill Tilden or (United States) George Lott or (United States) Les Stoefen	Tilden–Lott	35–6*	
1935 Jan 9–Apr 29	North America tour	1. (United States) Ellsworth Vines; 2. (Germany) Hans Nüsslein; 3. (United States) Bill Tilden or (United States) George Lott or (United States) Les Stoefen	Vines/Tilden–Lott/Stoefen	20–10	
1936 Jan 11–Jun 7	North America tour (Note: Split with Tilden group after openers in New York and Chicago.)	Principals: 1. (United States) Ellsworth Vines; 2. (United States) Les Stoefen; Secondaries: (United States) George Lott; (United States) Berkeley Bell	Vines–Stoefen	33–5*	
1937 Jan 6–May 12	North America tour	Principals: 1. (United States) Ellsworth Vines; 2. (United Kingdom) Fred Perry; Secondaries: (United States) George Lott; (United States) Bruce Barnes	Vines–Perry	32–29	
1937 Jan 6–May 12	North America tour	Principals: 1. (United States) Ellsworth Vines; 2. (United Kingdom) Fred Perry; Secondaries: (United States) George Lott; (United States) Bruce Barnes	Tilden–Perry	2–0	
1937 Jan 6–May 12	North America tour	Principals: 1. (United States) Ellsworth Vines; 2. (United Kingdom) Fred Perry; Secondaries: (United States) George Lott; (United States) Bruce Barnes	Barnes–Lott	25-19*	
1937 Jan 6–May 12	North America tour	Principals: 1. (United States) Ellsworth Vines; 2. (United Kingdom) Fred Perry; Secondaries: (United States) George Lott; (United States) Bruce Barnes	Perry/Vines–Barnes/Lott	25–16*	
1938 Jan 11–May 30	North America tour (Note: Jack Harris manager.)	Principals: 1. (United States) Ellsworth Vines; 2. (United Kingdom) Fred Perry; Secondaries: 1. (United States) Walter Senior; 2. (United States) Berkeley Bell	Vines–Perry	49–35	
1938 Jan 11–May 30	North America tour	Principals: 1. (United States) Ellsworth Vines; 2. (United Kingdom) Fred Perry; Secondaries: 1. (United States) Walter Senior; 2. (United States) Berkeley Bell	Senior–Bell	25–12*	
1938 Jan 11–May 30	North America tour	Principals: 1. (United States) Ellsworth Vines; 2. (United Kingdom) Fred Perry; Secondaries: 1. (United States) Walter Senior; 2. (United States) Berkeley Bell	Senior/Vines–Bell/Perry	33–21*	
1939 Jan 3–Mar 6	North America tour	Principals: 1. (United States) Don Budge; 2. (United States) Ellsworth Vines; Secondaries: (United States) Dick Skeen; (United States) Bruce Barnes; (United States) Alfred Chapin	Budge–Vines	22–17	
1939 Jan 3–Mar 6	North America tour	Principals: 1. (United States) Don Budge; 2. (United States) Ellsworth Vines; Secondaries: (United States) Dick Skeen; (United States) Bruce Barnes; (United States) Alfred Chapin	Skeen–Chapin	13–2*	
1939 Mar 10–May 8	North America tour	Principals: 1. (United States) Don Budge; 2. (United Kingdom) Fred Perry; Secondaries: (United States) Ben Gorchakoff; (United States) Walter Senior	Budge–Perry	28–8	
1941 Jan 6–May 10	North America tour (Note: Jack Harris manager.)	1. (United States) Don Budge; 2. (United States) Bill Tilden	Budge–Tilden	47–6	
1941 Dec 26–Apr 5	U.S. tour (Note: Alexis Thompson manager.)	1. (United States) Don Budge (52–18); 2. (United States) Bobby Riggs (36–36); 3. (United States) Frank Kovacs (25–26); 4. (United Kingdom) Fred Perry (23–30); 5. (United States) Lester Stoefen (3–31)	Budge–Riggs	15–10	
1941 Dec 26–Apr 5	U.S. tour	1. (United States) Don Budge (52–18); 2. (United States) Bobby Riggs (36–36); 3. (United States) Frank Kovacs (25–26); 4. (United Kingdom) Fred Perry (23–30); 5. (United States) Lester Stoefen (3–31)	Budge–Kovacs	12–5	
1941 Dec 26–Apr 5	U.S. tour	1. (United States) Don Budge (52–18); 2. (United States) Bobby Riggs (36–36); 3. (United States) Frank Kovacs (25–26); 4. (United Kingdom) Fred Perry (23–30); 5. (United States) Lester Stoefen (3–31)	Budge–Perry	15–3	
1941 Dec 26–Apr 5	U.S. tour	1. (United States) Don Budge (52–18); 2. (United States) Bobby Riggs (36–36); 3. (United States) Frank Kovacs (25–26); 4. (United Kingdom) Fred Perry (23–30); 5. (United States) Lester Stoefen (3–31)	Budge–Stoefen	10–0	
1946 Mar 9–Jun 2	North America tour	Principals: 1. (United States) Bobby Riggs; 2. (United States) Don Budge; Secondaries: (United States) Wayne Sabin; (United States) John Faunce	Riggs–Budge	24–22	
1947 Dec 26–1948 May 27	North America tour	Principals: 1. (United States) Jack Kramer; 2. (United States) Bobby Riggs; Secondaries: (Australia) Dinny Pails; (Ecuador) Pancho Segura	Kramer–Riggs	69–20	
1949 Oct 25–1950 May 21	World tour	Principals: 1. (United States) Jack Kramer; 2. (United States) Pancho Gonzales; Secondaries: (United States) Frank Parker; (Ecuador) Pancho Segura; (United States) Bobby Riggs	Kramer–Gonzales	94–29	
1950 Oct 28–1951 Mar	North America tour	1. (United States) Jack Kramer; 2. (Ecuador) Pancho Segura	Kramer–Segura	64–28	
1953 Jan 6–Jun 1	North America tour	Principals: 1. (United States) Jack Kramer; 2. (Australia) Frank Sedgman; Secondaries: 1. (Ecuador) Pancho Segura; 2. (Australia) Ken McGregor	Kramer–Sedgman	54–41	
1953 Jan 6–Jun 1	North America tour	Principals: 1. (United States) Jack Kramer; 2. (Australia) Frank Sedgman; Secondaries: 1. (Ecuador) Pancho Segura; 2. (Australia) Ken McGregor	Segura–McGregor	71–25	
1954 Jan 3–May 30	North America tour	1. (United States) Pancho Gonzales; 2. (Ecuador) Pancho Segura; 3. (Australia) Frank Sedgman; 4. (United States) Don Budge	Gonzales–Sedgman	30–21	
1954 Jan 3–May 30	North America tour	1. (United States) Pancho Gonzales; 2. (Ecuador) Pancho Segura; 3. (Australia) Frank Sedgman; 4. (United States) Don Budge	Gonzales–Segura	30–21	
1954 Jan 3–May 30	North America tour	1. (United States) Pancho Gonzales; 2. (Ecuador) Pancho Segura; 3. (Australia) Frank Sedgman; 4. (United States) Don Budge	Segura–Sedgman	23–22	
1955 Dec 9–1956 Jun 3	North America tour	Principals: 1. (United States) Pancho Gonzales; 2. (United States) Tony Trabert; Secondaries: (Ecuador) Pancho Segura; (Australia) Rex Hartwig; (United States) Jack Kramer	Gonzales–Trabert	74–27	
1957 Jan–May	World tour	Principals: 1. (United States) Pancho Gonzales; 2. (Australia) Ken Rosewall; Secondaries: (Australia) Dinny Pails; (Ecuador) Pancho Segura	Gonzales–Rosewall	50–26	
1958 Jan–May	World tour	Principals: 1. (United States) Pancho Gonzales; 2. (Australia) Lew Hoad; Secondaries: (United States) Tony Trabert; (Ecuador) Pancho Segura; (Australia) Ken Rosewall; (Australia) Frank Sedgman	Gonzales–Hoad	51–36	
1959 Feb 20–May 31	North America tour	1. (United States) Pancho Gonzales (47–15); 2. (Australia) Lew Hoad (42–20); 3. (Australia) Ashley Cooper (21–40); 4. (Australia) Mal Anderson (13–48)	Gonzales–Cooper	14–0	
1959 Feb 20–May 31	North America tour	1. (United States) Pancho Gonzales (47–15); 2. (Australia) Lew Hoad (42–20); 3. (Australia) Ashley Cooper (21–40); 4. (Australia) Mal Anderson (13–48)	Gonzales–Anderson	20–0	
1959 Feb 20–May 31	North America tour	1. (United States) Pancho Gonzales (47–15); 2. (Australia) Lew Hoad (42–20); 3. (Australia) Ashley Cooper (21–40); 4. (Australia) Mal Anderson (13–48)	Hoad-Gonzales	15–13	
1959 Feb 20–May 31	North America tour	1. (United States) Pancho Gonzales (47–15); 2. (Australia) Lew Hoad (42–20); 3. (Australia) Ashley Cooper (21–40); 4. (Australia) Mal Anderson (13–48)	Hoad–Cooper	18–2	
1959 Feb 20–May 31	North America tour	1. (United States) Pancho Gonzales (47–15); 2. (Australia) Lew Hoad (42–20); 3. (Australia) Ashley Cooper (21–40); 4. (Australia) Mal Anderson (13–48)	Hoad–Anderson	9–5	
1959 Feb 20–May 31	North America tour	1. (United States) Pancho Gonzales (47–15); 2. (Australia) Lew Hoad (42–20); 3. (Australia) Ashley Cooper (21–40); 4. (Australia) Mal Anderson (13–48)	Cooper–Anderson	19–8	
1960 Jan–Jun	World tour	1. (United States) Pancho Gonzales (49–8); 2. (Australia) Ken Rosewall (32–25); 3. (Ecuador) Pancho Segura (22–28); 4. (United States) Alex Olmedo (11–44)	Gonzales–Rosewall	20–4	
1960 Dec 30–1961 May 28	World tour	1. (United States) Pancho Gonzales (33–14); 2. (Spain) Andrés Gimeno (27–20); 3. = (Australia) Lew Hoad (24–23) = (United States) Tony Trabert (24–23); 5. (United States) Barry MacKay (tennis) (22–25); 6. (United States) Alex Olmedo (18–29); 7. (United States) Butch Buchholz (16–31)	—	—	
1960 Dec 30–1961 May 28	World tour	Finals: 1. (United States) Pancho Gonzales; 2. (Spain) Andrés Gimeno; 3. (Australia) Frank Sedgman; 4. (United States) Barry MacKay	Gonzales–Gimeno (final)	21–7	
1960 Dec 30–1961 May 28	World tour	Finals: 1. (United States) Pancho Gonzales; 2. (Spain) Andrés Gimeno; 3. (Australia) Frank Sedgman; 4. (United States) Barry MacKay	Sedgman–MacKay (3rd place)	15–13	
1963 Feb–May 30	North America tour	1. (Australia) Ken Rosewall (31–10); 2. (Australia) Rod Laver (26–16); 3. (Australia) Butch Buchholz (23–18); 4. (Spain) Andrés Gimeno (21–20); 5. (United States) Barry MacKay (12–29); 6. (Chile) Luis Ayala (11–30)	Rosewall–Laver	5–3	
1963 Feb–May 30	North America tour	Finals: 1. (Australia) Ken Rosewall; 2. (Australia) Rod Laver; 3. (Spain) Andrés Gimeno; 4. (United States) Butch Buchholz	Rosewall–Laver (final)	14–4	
1963 Feb–May 30	North America tour	Finals: 1. (Australia) Ken Rosewall; 2. (Australia) Rod Laver; 3. (Spain) Andrés Gimeno; 4. (United States) Butch Buchholz	Gimeno–Buchholz (3rd place)	11–7	

=== Winners ===
Tours	Player	Years
7	(United States) Pancho Gonzales	1954, 56, 57, 58, 59, 60, 61
5	(United States) Ellsworth Vines	1934, 35, 36, 37, 38
4	(United States) Don Budge	1939 (Mar), 39 (May), 41, 42
4	(United States) Jack Kramer	1948, 50, 51, 53
3	(United States) Bill Tilden	1931, 32, 33
1	(Czechoslovakia) Karel Koželuh	1928
1	(United States) Bobby Riggs	1946
1	(Australia) Ken Rosewall	1963

== Tournament ranking series ==
There were occasionally important professional tournament series which were referred to as establishing full field rankings, necessitated by the increasing number of prominent professional players in the post-World War II period. In 1946, there was a professional tournament series of 18 events in the U.S. under the organization of the P.P.A.T. (Professional Players Association of Tennis) linked by a points system won by Bobby Riggs, which he relied upon as evidence of his mastery of the entire pro field. In 1959, Jack Kramer established a series of 15 tournaments in Australia, North America, and Europe linked by a points system which provided a full field ranking of all the contract professionals, plus a substantial money prize for the top finisher, with Lew Hoad emerging as world No. 1. The 1959 tournament series was officially named the "Ampol Open Trophy", after the principal sponsor of the tournaments, the Ampol oil company, and the trophy awarded to the winner. The 1959 tournament series was referred to as "the world series" in Kramer's brochure and a newspaper report. In 1960, Kramer again established a tournament series with a points system, but both Gonzales and Hoad withdrew from the field and the final results are unknown. In 1964, under Kramer's advice, the I.P.T.P.A. (International Professional Tennis Players Association) established a series of 17 tournaments in U.S. and Europe with a points system, and a world No. 1 and world champion was named as a result, Ken Rosewall. This system continued in subsequent years, with Rod Laver attaining the No. 1 ranking position for the 1965, 1966, and 1967 pro tournament series. The final results of these later tournament series were not published. In 1968–69, the two pro tennis tours, the NTL and the WCT, each had a tournament series ranking list which contributed four players from each tour to a combined final tournament at the Madison Square Garden. Tony Roche won the 1968 event, and Rod Laver won the 1969 event. Beginning in 1970, the ILTF authorized Kramer to arrange a year-end championship in which the pros with the highest tournament series points competed for the title of Grand Prix champion. This event was held in various locations and finally remained at Madison Square Garden from 1977 to 1989. In 1990, the ATP took over running the event and started awarding ranking points for the 8 qualifiers based on their results in the tournament. Currently, the championship is known as the "ATP Finals".

Date	Tournament series	Standings	Points results	Ref.
1946 June 11 – Nov 17	P.P.A.T. 18 tournaments (Note: The P.P.A.T. tournaments, from where points were introduced on June 11 were: Southern Pro – Memphis; U.S. Pro Clay Court – Richmond; New England Pro – Longwood; Middle States Pro – Philadelphia Country Club; U.S. Pro – Forest Hills; Cape Cod Pro; New Castle Pro; White Mountain Pro; Cotton State Pro – Birmingham; North Carolina Pro – Asheville; Pittsburgh Pro; Indianapolis Pro; Michigan Pro – Kalamazoo; Great Lakes Pro – Chicago; Oklahoma City Pro; San Francisco Pro; La Jolla Pro; U.S. Pro Hard Court.)	1. (United States) Bobby Riggs; 2. (United States) Don Budge; 3. (United States) Frank Kovacs; 4. (United States) Welby Van Horn; 5. (United States) Carl Earn; 6. (United States) Wayne Sabin; 7. (United States) John Faunce; 8. (United States) Jack Jossi; 9. (United States) Fred Perry; 10. (United States) Bill Tilden	278; 164; 149; 143; 94; 74; 68; 60; 50; 36	
1959 Jan 8–1960 Jan 2	Ampol Open Trophy 15 tournaments (Note: The Ampol Open tournaments were: Melbourne – Olympic Velodrome (10 Jan); Brisbane (20 Jan); Perth (26 Jan); Sydney – Marks Athletic Field (4 Feb); Adelaide – Norwood Cricket Oval (11 Feb); L.A. Masters – L.A. Tennis Club (5 Jun); Toronto – Toronto Lawn Tennis Club (16 Jun); New York City – Forest Hills (23 Jun); Paris – Roland Garros (8 Sep); London – Wembley (19 Sep); Perth (26 Nov); Adelaide – Memorial Drive Tennis Club (1 Dec); Sydney – White City (8 Dec); Brisbane – Milton Courts (15 Dec); Melbourne – Kooyong (26 Dec).)	1. (Australia) Lew Hoad; 2. (United States) Pancho Gonzales; 3. (Australia) Ken Rosewall; 4. (Australia) Frank Sedgman; 5. (United States) Tony Trabert; 6. = (Ecuador) Pancho Segura = (Australia) Mal Anderson; 8. (Australia) Ashley Cooper; 9. (Australia) Mervyn Rose; 10. (United States) Alex Olmedo	51; 43; 41; 32; 25; 14; 14; 8; 1; 1	
1964 May 19–Oct 31	I.P.T.P.A. 17 tournaments (Note: The I.P.T.P.A. tournaments were: World Pro Indoor – College Park; U.S. Pro Indoor – White Plains; L.A. Masters RR; St. Louis Pro; Monterey Pro; Milwaukee Pro; U.S. Pro – Longwood; Cannes Pro; Noordwijk Pro; Geneva Pro; French Pro – Coubertin; Wembley Pro; Bavarian Pro – Munich; Hanover Pro; Rhodesian Pro; Johannesburg Pro; Cape Town Pro.)	1. (Australia) Ken Rosewall; 2. (Australia) Rod Laver; 3. (United States) Pancho Gonzales; 4. (Spain) Andrés Gimeno; 5. (United States) Butch Buchholz; 6. (Australia) Lew Hoad; 7. (United States) Alex Olmedo; 8. = (France) Robert Haillet = (Switzerland) Luis Ayala	—	

=== Winners ===
Series	Player	Years
4	(Australia) Rod Laver	1965, 1966, 1967, 1969
1	(United States) Bobby Riggs	1946
1	(Australia) Lew Hoad	1959
1	(Australia) Ken Rosewall	1964
1	(Australia) Tony Roche	1968

== Other professional tours ==
* Partial or incomplete result.

=== Women ===
Date	Pro Tour	Standings	Head-to-head results		Ref.
1926 Oct 9–1927 Feb	North America tour (Note: C. C. Pyle promoter.)	1. (France) Suzanne Lenglen; 2. (United States) Mary K. Browne	Lenglen–Browne	38–0	
1927 Jul 5–Jul	U.K. tour (Note: Charles B. Cochran promoter.)	(France) Suzanne Lenglen; (Germany) Dorothea Köring; (United Kingdom) Evelyn Dewhurst	—	incomplete results	
1936 Jan 11–Apr	U.S. tour	1. (United States) Ethel Burkhardt Arnold; 2. (United States) Jane Sharp	Arnold–Sharp	—	
1936 Oct 9–	Asia tour	(United States) Jane Sharp; (Japan) Sanae Okada	Marble–Hardwick	incomplete results	
1941 Jan 6–May 10	North America tour (Note: Jack Harris manager.)	1. (United States) Alice Marble; 2. (United States) Mary Hardwick	Marble–Hardwick	58–3	
1942 Jun 6–	U.S. tour (Note: To benefit British-American Ambulance Corps.)	Principals: 1. (United Kingdom) Dorothy Round; 2. (United States) Mary Hardwick; Secondaries: (United States) Bobby Riggs; (United States) Wayne Sabin	Round–Hardwick	—	
1943 Jun 9–	U.S. tour (military posts)	Principals: 1. (United States) Alice Marble; 2. (United States) Mary Hardwick; Secondaries: (United States) Charles Hare	Marble–Hardwick	—	
1943	U.S. tour (Women's Army Corps bases) (Note: Sponsored by United Service Organizations.)	1. (Ireland) Eveleen Donelley; 2. (Canada) Lezlie Harrington	Donelley-Harrington	—	
1943 Sep–	U.S. Tour (colleges) (Note: Arranged by American Lawn Tennis magazine.)	1. (United States) Alice Marble; 2. (United States) Mary Hardwick	Marble–Hardwick	—	
1944	Canal Zone and Caribbean tour	1. (United States) Alice Marble; 2. (United States) Mary Hardwick	Marble–Hardwick	—	
1947 Jun 8–	U.S. & Europe tour	1. (United States) Pauline Betz; 2. (United States) Sarah Palfrey Cooke	Betz–Palfrey Cooke	—	
1951	U.S. tour	1. (United States) Pauline Betz; 2. (United States) Gussie Moran	Betz–Moran	—	
1959 Dec 28–1960	U.S. tour	1. (United States) Althea Gibson; 2. (United States) Karol Fageros	Gibson–Fageros	114–4	

=== Men ===
Date	Pro tour	Standings	Head-to-head results		Ref.
1926 Oct 9–1927 Feb	North America tour (Note: Secondaries to Lenglen tour. C. C. Pyle promoter.)	(United States) Vincent Richards; (France) Paul Féret; (United States) Howard Kinsey; (United States) Harvey Snodgrass	—	incomplete results	
1927 Jul 5–Jul	U.K. tour (Note: Charles B. Cochran promoter.)	(Czechoslovakia) Karel Koželuh; (United States) Howard Kinsey	Koželuh–Kinsey	incomplete results	
1929 Sep–Oct 27	U.S. tour	1. (Czechoslovakia) Karel Koželuh; 2. (United States) Vincent Richards	Koželuh–Richards	5–2	
1930	U.S. tour	Principals: 1. (Czechoslovakia) Karel Koželuh; 2. (United States) Vincent Richards; Secondaries: (United Kingdom) Dan Maskell; (United States) Allen Behr; (Germany) Roman Najuch; (United States) Charles Wood	Koželuh–Richards	4–2	
1931 May 9–17	North America tour	1. (United States) Bill Tilden; 2. (United States) Vincent Richards	Tilden–Richards	4–0*	
1931 Oct 21–Nov 9	Europe tour (Note: Jeff Dickson promoter.)	(United States) Bill Tilden; (Republic of Ireland) Albert Burke; (Czechoslovakia) Karel Koželuh; (France) Martin Plaa; (United States) Francis Hunter; (Germany) Hans Nüsslein; (Germany) Roman Najuch	—	incomplete results	
1932 Sep 17–Nov 27	Europe tour (Note: Roman Najuch manager. Many local players including amateurs also participated.)	(United States) Bill Tilden; (Germany) Hans Nüsslein; (Germany) Roman Najuch; (United States) Bruce Barnes; Various local playeres	—	incomplete results	
1933	Europe tour (Note: Many local players including amateurs also participated in various one-night stands and team events.)	(United States) Bill Tilden; (United States) Bruce Barnes; (Germany) Hans Nüsslein; (Germany) Roman Najuch; Various local players	—	incomplete results	
1933	U.S. tour	(United States) Bill Tilden; (United States) Francis Hunter; (United States) Bruce Barnes; (United States) Vincent Richards; (United States) Theodore Rericha; (United States) Emmett Paré	—	incomplete results	
1933	South America tour	(Germany) Hans Nüsslein; (Czechoslovakia) Karel Koželuh; Various local players	Nüsslein–Koželuh	incomplete results	
1933–1934	South America tour	(France) Henri Cochet; (France) Martin Plaa; Various local players	—	incomplete results	
1934 Feb 19–Mar 19	North America tour	1. United States (10); Bill Tilden; Ellsworth Vines; 2. France (0); Henri Cochet; Martin Plaa	Vines–Cochet	10–0	
1934 Feb 19–Mar 19	North America tour	1. United States (10); Bill Tilden; Ellsworth Vines; 2. France (0); Henri Cochet; Martin Plaa	Vines–Plaa	8–2	
1934 Feb 19–Mar 19	North America tour	1. United States (10); Bill Tilden; Ellsworth Vines; 2. France (0); Henri Cochet; Martin Plaa	Tilden–Cochet	8–2	
1934 Feb 19–Mar 19	North America tour	1. United States (10); Bill Tilden; Ellsworth Vines; 2. France (0); Henri Cochet; Martin Plaa	Tilden–Plaa	10–0	
1934 April 2–May	U.S. tour	(United States) Vincent Richards; (United States) Bruce Barnes; (France) Henri Cochet; (France) Martin Plaa	—	incomplete results	
1934 Aug–Sep	Europe tour	(United States) Bill Tilden; (France) Martin Plaa; (United States) Keith Gledhill; (France) Alfred Estrabeau; (France) Henri Cochet; (France) Robert Ramillon	—	incomplete results	
1935	World tour	(France) Henri Cochet; (Australia) R. O. Cummings; (Australia) James Willard; (Australia) James Anderson; Various other local players	—	incomplete results	
1936 Jan–Jun	U.S. tour (Note: Split from Vines group after openers in New York and Chicago.)	Principals: 1. (United States) Bill Tilden; 2. (United States) Bruce Barnes; Secondaries: (United States) Jimmy McClure	Tilden–Barnes	—	
1936 Oct 9–Nov	Asian tour	1. (United States) Ellsworth Vines; 2. (United States) Bill Tilden	Vines–Tilden	—	
1937 Jan–Apr	North America tour	(United States) Bill Tilden; (France) Martin Plaa; (Japan) Hytaro Satoh; (United States) Alfred Chapin	—	incomplete results	
1937 Mar 24–Apr 10	U.S. tour	Principals: 1. (United Kingdom) Fred Perry; 2. (United States) Bill Tilden; Secondaries: (United States) Vincent Richards; (United States) George Lott; (United States) Bruce Barnes	Perry–Tilden	4–1*	
1937 Mar 24–Apr 10	U.S. tour	Principals: 1. (United Kingdom) Fred Perry; 2. (United States) Bill Tilden; Secondaries: (United States) Vincent Richards; (United States) George Lott; (United States) Bruce Barnes	Perry/Vines–Richards/Tilden	5–0	
1937 May–Jun 15	Europe Tour	Principals: 1. (United Kingdom) Fred Perry; 2. (United States) Ellsworth Vines; Secondaries: (Germany) Hans Nüsslein; (United States) Bill Tilden; (France) Martin Plaa; (United States) Lester Stoefen; (France) Alfred Estrabeau; (France) Henri Cochet; Various local players	Perry–Vines	6–3	
1937 Oct	Italy tour	(France) Henri Cochet; (United States) Bill Tilden; (France) Robert Ramillon; (Germany) Hans Nüsslein	—	incomplete results	
1937 Nov 20–1938 Mar 24	Egypt & Asia tour	(France) Henri Cochet; (United States) Bill Tilden; (France) Robert Ramillon; (Republic of Ireland) Albert Burke; Various local players	Cochet–Tilden	incomplete results	
1937 Nov 20–1938 Mar 24	Egypt & Asia tour	(France) Henri Cochet; (United States) Bill Tilden; (France) Robert Ramillon; (Republic of Ireland) Albert Burke; Various local players	Ramillon–Burke	incomplete results	
1938	U.S. tour	(United States) Vincent Richards; (United Kingdom) Fred Perry; (Czechoslovakia) Karel Koželuh; (United States) Berkeley Bell; (United States) Bruce Barnes	—	incomplete results	
1938 Nov 15–Nov 29	Caribbean tour	(United States) Ellsworth Vines; (United Kingdom) Fred Perry	Vines–Perry	4–4	
1939 May 25–Aug 30	Europe tour (Note: Jack Harris manager.)	1. (United States) Don Budge; 2. (United States) Ellsworth Vines; 3. (United States) Bill Tilden or (United States) Lester Stoefen	Budge–Vines	15–5	
1939 May 25–Aug 30	Europe tour	1. (United States) Don Budge; 2. (United States) Ellsworth Vines; 3. (United States) Bill Tilden or (United States) Lester Stoefen	Budge–Tilden	—	
1939 May 25–Aug 30	Europe tour	1. (United States) Don Budge; 2. (United States) Ellsworth Vines; 3. (United States) Bill Tilden or (United States) Lester Stoefen	Budge–Stoefen	—	
1939 Oct–1940 Jan	U.S. & Mexico tour	(United Kingdom) Fred Perry; (United States) Bill Tilden; (United States) Lester Stoefen; (United States) Ben Gorchakoff; (United States) Bruce Barnes	—	incomplete results	
1940	U.S. tour	(United Kingdom) Fred Perry; (United States) Bill Tilden; (United States) Vincent Richards; (United States) Ben Gorchakoff	Perry–Tilden	incomplete results	
1941 Jun–Sep 1	U.S. tour	Principals: 1. (United Kingdom) Fred Perry; 2. (United States) Bill Tilden; Secondaries: (United States) Vincent Richards; (Czechoslovakia) Karel Koželuh	Perry–Tilden	incomplete results	
1941 Jun–Sep 1	U.S. tour	Principals: 1. (United Kingdom) Fred Perry; 2. (United States) Bill Tilden; Secondaries: (United States) Vincent Richards; (Czechoslovakia) Karel Koželuh	Koželuh–Richards*	incomplete results	
1946 Feb–Aug	U.S. tour	1. (United Kingdom) Fred Perry; 2. (United States) Bill Tilden		incomplete results	
1946 Dec–1947 Jan	South African tour	(United States) Don Budge; (United States) Bobby Riggs	Budge–Riggs	incomplete results	
1947 Feb	Europe tour	(United States) Don Budge; (United States) Bobby Riggs	Budge–Riggs	incomplete results	
1947 Apr–Sep	USA Pro Challenge Tour	1. (United States) Frank Kovacs (6–5); 2. (United States) Bobby Riggs (5–6)	Kovacs–Riggs	—	(Note: See:)
1948 Jun–Jul	South America tour	1. (United States) Jack Kramer; 2. (Ecuador) Pancho Segura; 3. (Australia) Dinny Pails; 4. (United States) Bobby Riggs	—	incomplete results	
1948 Sep–Nov	Australia tour	1. (United States) Jack Kramer; 2. (Ecuador) Pancho Segura; 3. (Australia) Dinny Pails; 4. (United States) Bobby Riggs	—	incomplete results	
1950 Nov–Dec	New Zealand tour	1. (Australia) Dinny Pails; 2. (United States) Pancho Gonzales; 3. (United States) Don Budge; 4. (United States) Frank Parker	—	incomplete results	
1951 Jan–Feb	Australia tour	1. (United States) Pancho Gonzales (36–6); 2. (Australia) Dinny Pails (27–15); 3. (United States) Frank Parker (14–28); 4. (United States) Don Budge (9–33)	—	—	
1951 Oct–Nov	South America tour	1. (Ecuador) Pancho Segura; 2. (United States) Pancho Gonzales	Segura–Gonzales	incomplete results	
1953 Aug–Sep	Europe tour	(Australia) Dinny Pails; (Australia) Ken McGregor; (United States) Pancho Segura; (Australia) Frank Sedgman	—	incomplete results	
1954 Sep–Oct	Asia tour	1. (Australia) Frank Sedgman (10–7–1); 2. (United States) Pancho Gonzales (10–8); 3. (Ecuador) Pancho Segura (10–8); 4. (United States) Jack Kramer (5–12–1)	—	—	
1954 Nov–Dec	Australia tour	1. (United States) Pancho Gonzales; 2. (Australia) Frank Sedgman or (Ecuador) Pancho Segura; 4. (Australia) Ken McGregor	Gonzales–Sedgman	16–9	
1954 Nov–Dec	Australia tour	1. (United States) Pancho Gonzales; 2. (Australia) Frank Sedgman or (Ecuador) Pancho Segura; 4. (Australia) Ken McGregor	Gonzales–Segura	4–2	
1954 Nov–Dec	Australia tour	1. (United States) Pancho Gonzales; 2. (Australia) Frank Sedgman or (Ecuador) Pancho Segura; 4. (Australia) Ken McGregor	Gonzales–McGregor	15–0	
1955 Jan–Feb	Australia tour	(Australia) Frank Sedgman; (United States) Pancho Gonzales; (Australia) Ian Ayre; (Ecuador) Pancho Segura	—	incomplete results	
1955 Jul–Sep	Europe tour	(Australia) Ken McGregor; (United States) Pancho Gonzales; (Ecuador) Pancho Segura; (Australia) Frank Sedgman; (United Kingdom) Fred Perry	—	incomplete results	
1956 Jun–Jul	South America tour	(United States) Pancho Gonzales; (United States) Tony Trabert; (Australia) Frank Sedgman; (United States) Jack Kramer	—	incomplete results	
1956 Aug–Oct	Europe tour	(United States) Pancho Gonzales; (United States) Tony Trabert; (Australia) Frank Sedgman; (Australia) Rex Hartwig	—	incomplete results	
1956 Oct–Nov	South Africa tour	1. (United States) Pancho Gonzales (9–4); 2. (Australia) Frank Sedgman (7–6); 3. (United States) Tony Trabert (6–7); 4. (Australia) Rex Hartwig (4–9)	—		
1957 Jun–Jul	South America tour	(Ecuador) Pancho Segura; (Australia) Dinny Pails; (Australia) Ken Rosewall; (United States) Jack Kramer	—	incomplete results	
1957 Aug–Oct	Europe tour	(Australia) Ken Rosewall; (Ecuador) Pancho Segura; (Australia) Lew Hoad; (United States) Jack Kramer	—	incomplete results	
1957 Oct–Nov	South Africa tour	(Australia) Ken Rosewall; (Ecuador) Pancho Segura; (Australia) Lew Hoad; (United States) Jack Kramer	—	incomplete results	
1957 Nov	Asia tour	(Australia) Ken Rosewall; (Ecuador) Pancho Segura; (Australia) Lew Hoad; (United States) Jack Kramer	—	incomplete results	
1957 Nov–Dec	Australian tour	1. (Australia) Ken Rosewall; 2. (Australia) Lew Hoad; 3. (Australia) Frank Sedgman; 4. (Ecuador) Pancho Segura	—	incomplete results	
1958 Jul–Oct	Europe tour	(Australia) Ken Rosewall; (Australia) Lew Hoad; (United States) Tony Trabert; (Ecuador) Pancho Segura	—	incomplete results	
1958 2 Aug–25 Oct	Perrier Trophy tour	1. (Australia) Ken Rosewall; 2. (Australia) Lew Hoad or (United States) Tony Trabert or (Ecuador) Pancho Segura	—	incomplete results	
1958 Nov–Dec	Asia tour	(Australia) Ken Rosewall; (Australia) Frank Sedgman; (United States) Tony Trabert; (Ecuador) Pancho Segura	—	incomplete results	
1959 Jan–Feb	Australia tour	(Australia) Ken Rosewall; (Australia) Lew Hoad; (United States) Tony Trabert; (Ecuador) Pancho Segura; (Australia) Mal Anderson; (Australia) Ashley Cooper; (United States) Pancho Gonzales; (Australia) Frank Sedgman; (Australia) Ken McGregor; (Australia) Mervyn Rose	—	incomplete results	
1959 Feb–Mar	New Zealand tour	(Australia) Ken Rosewall; (United States) Tony Trabert; (Australia) Frank Sedgman; (Australia) Mervyn Rose	—	incomplete results	
1959 Jul–Oct	Grand Prix de Europe	1. (Australia) Frank Sedgman (18); 2. (Australia) Ken Rosewall (17); 3. (Australia) Lew Hoad (11); 4. (United States) Tony Trabert (8)	—	—	
1959 Nov	South African tour	1. (Australia) Ken Rosewall (12–2); 2. (Ecuador) Pancho Segura (9–5); 3. (Australia) Ashley Cooper (7–7); 4. (Australia) Mal Anderson (4–10); 5. (Australia) Mervyn Rose (3–11)	—	—	
1960 April	New Zealand tour	1. (Australia) Lew Hoad (7–3); 2. (Australia) Mal Anderson (7–3); 3. (Australia) Frank Sedgman (4–6); 4. (Australia) Ashley Cooper (2–8)	Hoad–Anderson	1–0	
1960 Jun–Aug	Grand Prix de Europe	1. (Australia) Ashley Cooper (72%); 2. (Spain) Andrés Gimeno (66%); 3. (Ecuador) Pancho Segura (43%); 4. (Australia) Mal Anderson (43%); 5. (United States) Alex Olmedo (37%)	—	—	
1960 Oct–Dec	Asia tour	(Australia) Ken Rosewall; (United States) Tony Trabert; (Australia) Ashley Cooper; (Australia) Lew Hoad; (Spain) Andrés Gimeno; (Ecuador) Pancho Segura; (Australia) Mal Anderson; (United States) Alex Olmedo	—	incomplete results	
1961 Feb	Europe tour	(United States) Tony Trabert; (United Kingdom) Mike Davies; (France) Robert Haillet; (Denmark) Kurt Nielsen	—	incomplete results	
1961 Apr	South America tour	1. (Ecuador) Pancho Segura (18–5); 2. (United States) Alex Olmedo (13–11); 3. (Australia) Ashley Cooper (12–12); 4. (United States) Butch Buchholz (5–20)	—	—	
1961 July	Soviet Union tour	1. (United States) Tony Trabert; 2. (United States) Butch Buchholz; 3. (Ecuador) Pancho Segura; 4. (Australia) Lew Hoad	—	—	
1961 Aug–Sep	British Isles tour	1. (Australia) Lew Hoad (6–4); 2. (United States) Pancho Gonzales (4–6)	Hoad–Gonzales	6–4	
1962 Mar	New Zealand tour	1. (Australia) Ken Rosewall; 2. (Spain) Andrés Gimeno; 3. (Australia) Frank Sedgman; 4. (Chile) Luis Ayala	Rosewall–Ayala	4–1	
1962 Mar	New Zealand tour	1. (Australia) Ken Rosewall; 2. (Spain) Andrés Gimeno; 3. (Australia) Frank Sedgman; 4. (Chile) Luis Ayala	Gimeno–Sedgman	3–2	
1962 Jul–Oct	Facis trophy	1. (Australia) Lew Hoad; (Ecuador) Pancho Segura; (Australia) Mal Anderson; (United States) Tony Trabert; (Australia) Ashley Cooper; (Australia) Ken Rosewall; (United States) Alex Olmedo; (United States) Butch Buchholz; (Spain) Andrés Gimeno; (United Kingdom) Mike Davies; (United States) Barry MacKay (tennis)	Winner: Hoad	—	
1962	European Cup	1. (Australia) Ashley Cooper; 2. (Spain) Andrés Gimeno	Winner: Cooper		
1962 Aug–Sep	Europe Tour	(Australia) Ashley Cooper; (Spain) Andrés Gimeno; (Australia) Lew Hoad; (United States) Tony Trabert; (Australia) Mal Anderson; (Chile) Luis Ayala; (United States) Butch Buchholz; (United Kingdom) Mike Davies; (France) Robert Haillet; (United States) Barry MacKay; (Denmark) Kurt Nielsen; (United States) Alex Olmedo; (Australia) Ken Rosewall; (Ecuador) Pancho Segura			
1963 Jan	Australasia tour	(Australia) Lew Hoad; (Australia) Rod Laver; (Australia) Ken Rosewall	Rosewall–Laver	11–2	
1963 Jan	Australasia tour	(Australia) Lew Hoad; (Australia) Rod Laver; (Australia) Ken Rosewall	Hoad–Laver	8–0	
1963 Jan–Feb	New Zealand tour	(Australia) Ken Rosewall (7–0); (Australia) Rod Laver (0–7); (Spain) Andrés Gimeno (5–2); (Chile) Luis Ayala (2–5)	—	incomplete results	
1963 Jul–Sep	Europe Tour	(Australia) Lew Hoad; (Chile) Luis Ayala; (United Kingdom) Mike Davies; (Spain) Andrés Gimeno; (France) Robert Haillet; (Australia) Rod Laver; (Denmark) Kurt Nielsen; (United States) Alex Olmedo; (Australia) Ken Rosewall; (Australia) Frank Sedgman	—	incomplete results	
1963	European Cup				
1963 Jul–Sep	Facis trophy	1. (Australia) Rod Laver; (Australia) Ken Rosewall; (Spain) Andrés Gimeno; (Australia) Frank Sedgman; (Australia) Lew Hoad; (France) Robert Haillet; (Chile) Luis Ayala; (United States) Alex Olmedo; (United Kingdom) Mike Davies; (Denmark) Kurt Nielsen	Winner: Laver	incomplete results	
1964 Jan	Australia tour	(Australia) Rod Laver; (Australia) Lew Hoad; (Australia) Mal Anderson; (Australia) Ashley Cooper	—	incomplete results	
1964 Feb–Mar	New Zealand tour	1. (Australia) Lew Hoad (7–5); 2. (Australia) Rod Laver (7–5); 3. (Australia) Ken Rosewall (6–6); 4. (Australia) Mal Anderson (4–8)	Hoad–Laver	3–1	
1964 Jul–Sep	Europe Tour	(Australia) Rod Laver; (Australia) Lew Hoad; (Australia) Ken Rosewall; (Australia) Frank Sedgman; (United States) Alex Olmedo; (United States) Pancho Gonzales; (Spain) Andrés Gimeno; (United States) Butch Buchholz; (Chile) Luis Ayala	—	incomplete results	
1964 Jul–Oct	Facis trophy	1. (Australia) Ken Rosewall; (Spain) Andrés Gimeno; (Australia) Frank Sedgman; (Australia) Lew Hoad; (United States) Butch Buchholz; (Chile) Luis Ayala; (United States) Alex Olmedo; (United States) Pancho Gonzales	Winner: Rosewall	incomplete results	
1964 Nov	France tour	(Australia) Rod Laver; (France) Robert Haillet; (Spain) Andrés Gimeno; (United States) Butch Buchholz	—	incomplete results	
1965 Jul–Oct	Europe Tour	(Australia) Rod Laver; (France) Robert Haillet; (Spain) Andrés Gimeno; (United States) Butch Buchholz; (Australia) Mal Anderson; (Chile) Luis Ayala; (United Kingdom) Mike Davies; (Australia) Ken Rosewall; (Ecuador) Pancho Segura; (Australia) Frank Sedgman	—	incomplete results	
1966 Apr	Europe tour	(Australia) Rod Laver; (France) Pierre Barthès; (Spain) Andrés Gimeno; (Australia) Lew Hoad	—	incomplete results	
1966 Aug–Sep	Europe Tour	(Australia) Rod Laver; (France) Pierre Barthès; (Australia) Mal Anderson; (United States) Butch Buchholz	—	incomplete results	
1967 Jan–Feb	Australasia tour	(Australia) Rod Laver; (United States) Dennis Ralston; (Australia) Fred Stolle; (United States) Pancho Gonzales; (Australia) Ken Rosewall	—	incomplete results	
1967 Apr	France tour	(Australia) Rod Laver; (United States) Dennis Ralston; (Australia) Fred Stolle; (France) Pierre Barthès	—	incomplete results	

== See also ==
- Major professional tennis tournaments before the Open Era
- World number 1 ranked male tennis players
- Top ten ranked male tennis players (1912–1972)

== Notes ==
Tournament series:

== Bibliography ==
- McCauley, Joe (2000). The History of Professional Tennis. Windsor: The Short Run Book Company Limited.
- Collins, Bud (2010). The Bud Collins History of Tennis (2nd ed.). New York: New Chapter Press. ISBN 978-0942257700.
- Jordan, Chris (2019). The Professional Tennis Archive. ASIN B09FZKBBZQ.
