= International Pro Championship of Britain =

International Pro Championships of Britain

Tournament information
- Founded: 1935
- Abolished: 1939
- Location: Southport; England
- Venue: Victoria Park
- Surface: Clay

The International Pro Championship of Britain (also known as the Southport Dunlop Cup for sponsorship purposes) was a professional men's tennis tournament held at Victoria Park in Southport, England between 1935 and 1939. It was open to professional players only, amateurs were not allowed to compete. The tournament was held on outdoor En-tout-cas, "all-weather" artificial clay and was played in July, except for the 1939 edition, which was held in August. Hans Nüsslein won four consecutive titles from 1936 through 1939.

== Past finals ==
=== Singles ===
Year	Date	Champions	Runners-up	Score
1935	10–13 July	(United States) Ellsworth Vines	(United States) Bill Tilden	6–1, 6–8, 4–6, 6–2, 6–2
1936	7–11 July	(Nazi Germany) Hans Nüsslein	(France) Henri Cochet	(Round Robin)
1937	13–17 July	(Nazi Germany) Hans Nüsslein	(France) Robert Ramillon	6–4, 6–3, 2–6, 6–4
1938	9–16 July	(Nazi Germany) Hans Nüsslein	(United States) Bill Tilden	(Round Robin)
1939	4–7 August	(Nazi Germany) Hans Nüsslein	(United States) Bill Tilden	6–2, 7–5, 6–4

=== Doubles ===
Year	Champions	Runners-up	Score
1935	(United States) Bill Tilden (United States) Ellsworth Vines	(France) Martin Plaa (France) Robert Ramillon	7–5, 6–8, 5–7, 6–1, 6–3
1936	(France) Henri Cochet (France) Robert Ramillon	(United States) Lester Stoefen (United States) Bill Tilden	(Round Robin)
1937	(United States) Lester Stoefen (United States) Bill Tilden	(France) Martin Plaa (France) Robert Ramillon	8–6, 17–15, 8–6
1939	(United States) Don Budge (United States) Ellsworth Vines	(United States) Lester Stoefen (United States) Bill Tilden	6–2, 7–9, 7–5, 8–6

== Draws ==
=== 1935 ===
Quarterfinals
(Germany) Hans Nüsslein	6	6	6
(Republic of Ireland) Albert Burke	3	4	2
(France) Martin Plaa	5	0	0
(United States) Bill Tilden	7	6	6

Semifinals
(United States) Ellsworth Vines	5	2	6	6	6
(France) Robert Ramillon	7	6	4	2	3
(Germany) Hans Nüsslein	4	4	1
(United States) Bill Tilden	6	6	6

Final
(United States) Ellsworth Vines	6	6	4	6	6
(United States) Bill Tilden	1	8	6	2	2

=== 1936 ===
Round robin		W–L	(Germany) Hans Nüsslein	(France) Henri Cochet	(France) Martin Plaa	(France) Robert Ramillon
1.	(Germany) Hans Nüsslein	3–0		6–3, 6–2, 6–2	6–1, 6–3, 6–2	6–3, 6–2, 6–4
2.	(France) Henri Cochet	2–1	3–6, 2–6, 3–6		6–3, 6–2, 6–3	6–3, 6–1, 6–2
3.	(France) Martin Plaa	1–2	1–6, 3–6, 2–6	3–6, 2–6, 3–6		2–6, 3–6, 6–3, 6–2, 6–3
4.	(France) Robert Ramillon	0–3	3–6, 2–6, 4–6	3–6, 1–6, 2–6	6–2, 6–3, 3–6, 2–6, 3–6	

=== 1938 ===
Round robin		W–L	(Germany) Hans Nüsslein	(United States) Bill Tilden	(France) Robert Ramillon	(France) Martin Plaa	(United Kingdom) Dan Maskell	(Republic of Ireland) Edmund Burke
1.	(Germany) Hans Nüsslein	5–0		6–1, 6–1, 5–7, 6–1	7–5, 6–3, 6–2	6–1, 6–1, 7–5	6–4, 6–2, 6–2	6–2, 6–4, 6–0
2.	(United States) Bill Tilden	4–1	1–6, 1–6, 7–5, 1–6		8–6, 6–0, 4–6, 6–2	6–2, 6–3, 6–0	6–3, 6–4, 8–6	6–4, 6–4, 6–3
3.	(France) Robert Ramillon	3–2	5–7, 3–6, 2–6	6–8, 0–6, 6–4, 2–6		6–3, 7–5, 6–0	6–1, 6–3, 7–5	6–4, 6–4, 6–3
4.	(France) Martin Plaa	2–3	1–6, 1–6, 5–7	2–6, 3–6, 0–6	3–6, 5–7, 0–6		6–4, 6–3, 6–2	6–3, 6–4, 6–3
5.	(United Kingdom) Dan Maskell	1–4	4–6, 2–6, 2–6	3–6, 4–6, 6–8	1–6, 3–6, 5–7	4–6, 3–6, 2–6		6–1, 6–1, 6–2
6.	(Republic of Ireland) Edmund Burke	0–5	4–6, 4–6, 3–6	2–6, 1–6, 1–6	4–6, 4–6, 3–6	3–6, 4–6, 3–6	1–6, 1–6, 2–6	

== See also ==
- Major professional tennis tournaments before the Open Era
