= French Pro Championship draws =

In 1930 the "Association Française des Professeurs de Tennis (AFPT)" held its first pro tournament, entitled "Championnat International de France Professionnel" (French Pro Championships) on June 18–22, 1930.

From 1930 the French Pro Championship were always played at Paris, on outdoor clay at Roland Garros except from 1963 to 1967 where it was held at Stade Pierre de Coubertin on indoor wood.

== 1930 ==
Round robin		W-L	(Czechoslovakia) Karel Koželuh	(Republic of Ireland) Albert Burke	(Germany) Roman Najuch	(France) Martin Plaa
1.	(Czechoslovakia) Karel Koželuh	3–0		6–1, 6–2, 6–1	6–2, 6–2, 6–4	6–1, 6–0, 6–3
2.	(Republic of Ireland) Albert Burke	2–1	1–6, 2–6, 1–6		6–0 rtd.	6–0, 8–6, 6–2
3.	(Germany) Roman Najuch	1–2	2–6, 2–6, 4–6	0–6 rtd.		6–4, 6–3, 6–1
4.	(France) Martin Plaa	0–3	1–6, 0–6, 3–6	0–6, 6–8, 2–6	4–6, 3–6, 1–6	

== 1931 ==
Round robin		W-L	(France) Martin Plaa	(France) Robert Ramillon	(France) Alfred Estrabeau	(France) Rene Tissot
1.	(France) Martin Plaa	3–0		6–3, 6–1, 3–6, 6–2	6–0, 5–7, 4–6, 6–1, 6–4	6–4, 7–5, 6–3
2.	(France) Robert Ramillon	2–1	3–6, 1–6, 6–3, 2–6		5–7, 6–4, 6–3, 6–4	6–0, 6–1, 6–2
3.	(France) Alfred Estrabeau	1–2	0–6, 7–5, 6–4, 1–6, 4–6	7–5, 4–6, 3–6, 4–6		6–2, 6–2, 6–2
4.	(France) Rene Tissot	0–3	4–6, 5–7, 3–6	0–6, 1–6, 2–6	2–6, 2–6, 2–6	

== 1932 ==
Round robin		W-L	(France) Robert Ramillon	(France) Martin Plaa	(France) Alfred Estrabeau	(France) Rene Tissot
1.	(France) Robert Ramillon	3–0		6–4, 3–6, 8–6, 6–4	9–7, 6–3, 6–3	6–2, 6–3, 6–4
2.	(France) Martin Plaa	2–1	4–6, 6–3, 6–8, 4–6		6–1, 6–2, 6–3	6–8, 6–3, 8–6, 6–4
3.	(France) Alfred Estrabeau	1–2	7–9, 3–6, 3–6	1–6, 2–6, 3–6		8–6, 6–1, 7–5
4.	(France) Rene Tissot	0–3	2–6, 3–6, 4–6	8–6, 3–6, 6–8, 4–6	6–8, 1–6, 5–7	

== 1934 ==
Quarterfinals
(France) Alfred Estrabeau	w/o
(France) Henri Cochet
(France) Martin Plaa	6	3	4	6	6
(United States) Keith Gledhill	2	6	6	0	1
(France) Robert Ramillon	6	10	6
(Republic of Ireland) Albert Burke	1	8	3
(United States) Bill Tilden	6	6	6
(Republic of Ireland) Edmund Burke	2	3	2

Semifinals
(France) Alfred Estrabeau	1	3	3
(France) Martin Plaa	6	6	6
(France) Robert Ramillon	7	3	6	5
(United States) Bill Tilden	9	6	2	7

Final
(France) Martin Plaa	2	4	5
(United States) Bill Tilden	6	6	7

== 1935 ==
Round of 16
(France) Martin Plaa	6	6	6
(France) Bajusz	3	2	2
(Republic of Ireland) Albert Burke	6	6	6
(France) Hemmes	1	1	1
(United States) Ellsworth Vines	6	6	6
(France) François Garnero	2	2	3
(France) Alfred Estrabeau	6	6	6
(France) Paul Henrion	1	1	1
(United States) Bill Tilden	6	6	6
(France) Henri Vissault	1	2	2
(Netherlands) Arris Waasdorp	6	6	6
Adolphe Bumy	0	0	0
(Germany) Hans Nüsslein	6	6	8
(France) Edgar Colliard	3	3	6
(France) Robert Ramillon	6	6	6
(Republic of Ireland) Edmund Burke	1	3	0

Quarterfinals
(France) Martin Plaa	9	4	1	6	6
(Republic of Ireland) Albert Burke	7	6	6	4	1
(United States) Ellsworth Vines	6	7	6
(France) Alfred Estrabeau	2	5	3
(United States) Bill Tilden	8	6	7
(Netherlands) Arris Waasdorp	6	0	5
(Germany) Hans Nüsslein	7	6	2	6
(France) Robert Ramillon	5	4	6	4

Semifinals
(France) Martin Plaa	5	3	4
(United States) Ellsworth Vines	7	6	6
(United States) Bill Tilden	7	6	3	1	3
(Germany) Hans Nüsslein	5	3	6	6	6

Final
(United States) Ellsworth Vines	10	6	3	6
(Germany) Hans Nüsslein	8	4	6	1

== 1936 ==
Round of 16
(United States) Lester Stoefen	6	6	6
(France) Dartenuc	1	1	2
(France) Henri Vissault
(France) Simon	w/o
(France) Robert Ramillon	6	6	6
(France) Canaveze	1	1	0
(France) Rene Tissot	6	6	6
(France) Adam	2	3	2
(France) Martin Plaa	6	6	6
(France) Tauter	3	1	1
(Republic of Ireland) Albert Burke	6	6	6
(France) François Garnero	1	2	1
(France) Henri Cochet	6	6	6
(France) J. Longuemare	4	2	1
(France) Robert Bacque	6	6	4	6
(France) Edgar Colliard	0	4	6	1

Quarterfinals
(United States) Lester Stoefen	3	3	6	6	6
(France) Henri Vissault	6	6	1	4	4
(France) Robert Ramillon	6	6	6
(France) René Tissot	2	2	4
(France) Martin Plaa	4	6	6	3	6
(Republic of Ireland) Albert Burke	6	3	1	6	3
(France) Henri Cochet	6	6	6
(France) Robert Bacque	3	2	4

Semifinals
(United States) Lester Stoefen	6	3	2	4
(France) Robert Ramillon	4	6	6	6
(France) Martin Plaa	0	1	1
(France) Henri Cochet	6	6	6

Final
(France) Robert Ramillon	3	1	1
(France) Henri Cochet	6	6	6

== 1937 ==
Round of 16
(Germany) Hans Nüsslein	6	6	6
(Switzerland) Andre Marigaux	2	1	1
(France) Robert Ramillon	7	6	6
(France) Hemmes	5	4	2
(United States) Bill Tilden	6	6	6
(France) François Garnero	3	4	2
(France) Henri Vissault	w/o
(Chile) Perico Facondi
(France) Henri Cochet	3	6	6	6
(France) Henri Ricco	6	3	1	1
(France) Goedraad	w/o
(Chile) Pilo Facondi
(France) Alfred Estrabeau	7	6	6
(France) Martin Plaa	5	4	3
(United States) Lester Stoefen	6	6	6
(France) Edgar Colliard	2	4	1

Quarterfinals
(Germany) Hans Nüsslein	1	7	6	6
(France) Robert Ramillon	6	5	4	4
(United States) Bill Tilden	6	6	6
(France) Henri Vissault	2	2	2
(France) Henri Cochet	6	6	6
(France) Goedraad	4	3	4
(France) Alfred Estrabeau	6	10	4	4	6
(United States) Lester Stoefen	4	8	6	6	3

Semifinals
(Germany) Hans Nüsslein	3	10	6	6
(United States) Bill Tilden	6	8	2	3
(France) Henri Cochet	3	6	6	6
(France) Alfred Estrabeau	6	4	4	1

Final
(Germany) Hans Nüsslein	6	8	6
(France) Henri Cochet	2	6	3

== 1938 ==
Quarterfinals
(United States) Bill Tilden	6	6	6
(Switzerland) Jean Brechbuhl	3	1	2
(France) Henri Vissault	6	2	9	7
(France) Robert Ramillon	3	6	7	5
(France) Martin Plaa	6	6	6
(Switzerland) André Marigaux	2	3	4
(Germany) Hans Nüsslein	6	6	6
(France) Robert Pettit	1	1	3

Semifinals
(United States) Bill Tilden	7	6	6
(France) Henri Vissault	5	2	2
(France) Martin Plaa	1	3	6	1
(Germany) Hans Nüsslein	6	6	3	6

Final
(United States) Bill Tilden	0	1	2
(Germany) Hans Nüsslein	6	6	6

== 1939 ==
Round of 16
(France) Robert Ramillon	6	6	6
(Republic of Ireland) Albert Burke	0	3	1
(Germany) Hans Nüsslein	6	6	6
(France) Pierre Goldschmidt	0	4	0
(France) Henri Cochet	6	6	6
(France) Robert Bacque	0	0	2
(France) Henri Vissault	6	6	6
(France) Martin Plaa	2	4	0

Quarterfinals
(United States) Ellsworth Vines	11	6	6
(France) Robert Ramillon	9	2	4
(United States) Lester Stoefen	6	6	6
(Germany) Hans Nüsslein	4	4	1
(United States) Bill Tilden	3	9	6	3	7
(France) Henri Cochet	6	7	3	6	5
(United States) Don Budge	6	6	6
(France) Henri Vissault	3	4	2

Semifinals
(United States) Ellsworth Vines	3	6	2	7	6
(United States) Lester Stoefen	6	1	6	5	1
(United States) Bill Tilden	6	3	5
(United States) Don Budge	8	6	7

Final
(United States) Ellsworth Vines	2	5	3
(United States) Don Budge	6	7	6

== 1956 ==
Round of 16
(Pakistan) Hamid Noor	6	6	7
(Italy) Marcello Del Bello	4	1	5
(Australia) Peter Cawthorn	6	7	7
(France) Jacqes Iemetti	2	5	5
(United Kingdom) Tony Mottram	6	7	6
(France) Robert Colin	3	5	0
(Italy) Giovanni Cucelli	6	6	6
(Austria) Gustav Specht	2	1	4

Quarterfinals
(United States) Pancho Gonzales	6	6	6
(Pakistan) Hamid Noor	4	3	2
(Australia) Rex Hartwig	6	6	6
(Australia) Peter Cawthorn	3	1	2
(United States) Tony Trabert	6	6	6
(United Kingdom) Tony Mottram	1	3	2
(Australia) Frank Sedgman	6	6	6
(Italy) Giovanni Cucelli	1	1	3

Semifinals
(United States) Pancho Gonzales	6	6	2	6
(Australia) Rex Hartwig	0	1	6	2
(United States) Tony Trabert	6	6	6
(Australia) Frank Sedgman	4	4	1

Final
(United States) Pancho Gonzales	3	6	7	6	2
(United States) Tony Trabert	6	4	5	8	6

== 1958 ==
Round of 16
(Ecuador) Pancho Segura	6	6	6
(Australia) Peter Cawthorn	2	2	2
(United States) Jack Kramer	6	6	5	6
(Australia) George Worthington	4	4	7	2
(Australia) Lew Hoad	8	7	7
(France) Jacqes Iemetti	6	5	5
(France) Paul Rémy	6	6	6
(France) Robert Colin	0	2	2

Quarterfinals
(Australia) Frank Sedgman	3	10	6	6
(Ecuador) Pancho Segura	6	8	2	4
(Australia) Ken Rosewall	6	6	6
(United States) Jack Kramer	3	4	4
(United States) Tony Trabert	6	0	3	4
(Australia) Lew Hoad	2	6	6	6
(United States) Pancho Gonzales	6	6	4	6	6
(France) Paul Rémy	2	8	6	2	1

Semifinals
(Australia) Frank Sedgman	4	3	7	2
(Australia) Ken Rosewall	6	6	5	6
(Australia) Lew Hoad	5	13	6	6
(United States) Pancho Gonzales	7	11	4	4

Final
(Australia) Ken Rosewall	3	6	6	6
(Australia) Lew Hoad	6	2	4	0

Seeding: source

== 1959 ==
Round of 16
(Australia) Ken Rosewall	6	6	6
(Hungary) József Asbóth	2	1	3
(Australia) Mal Anderson	6	6	6
(France) Robert Colin	1	0	0
(United States) Tony Trabert	6	6	6
(Australia) George Worthington	1	4	1
(Australia) Ashley Cooper	7	7	6
(Australia) Peter Cawthorn	5	5	3
(Ecuador) Pancho Segura	6	6	6
(Australia) Jack Arkinstall	1	3	4
(Australia) Frank Sedgman	6	6	6
(France) Jacqes Iemetti	1	2	2
(Australia) Lew Hoad	6	6	6
(Australia) Peter Molloy	1	1	0
(Australia) Mervyn Rose	3	6	6	6
(France) Paul Rémy	6	4	0	4

Quarterfinals
(Australia) Ken Rosewall	8	7	5	6
(Australia) Mal Anderson	6	5	7	4
(United States) Tony Trabert	1	6	1	6	6
(Australia) Ashley Cooper	6	2	6	3	3
(Ecuador) Pancho Segura	3	1	6	2
(Australia) Frank Sedgman	6	6	1	6
(Australia) Lew Hoad	8	6	6
(Australia) Mervyn Rose	6	2	4

Semifinals
(Australia) Ken Rosewall	2	0	2
(United States) Tony Trabert	6	6	6
(Australia) Frank Sedgman	3	6	6	6
(Australia) Lew Hoad	6	2	0	2

Final
(United States) Tony Trabert	6	6	6
(Australia) Frank Sedgman	4	4	4

== 1960 ==
Round of 16
(Australia) Ken Rosewall	6	6	4	6
(Denmark) Kurt Nielsen	3	3	6	1
(Australia) Malcolm Anderson	6	6	6
(France) Jacqes Iemetti	1	2	2
(Australia) Frank Sedgman	6	6	6
(France) Robert Haillet	4	2	2
(Spain) Andrés Gimeno	6	6	6
(Australia) Peter Cawthorn	2	2	2
(Australia) Lew Hoad	7	6	6
(France) Paul Rémy	5	2	2
(Ecuador) Pancho Segura	6	6	6
(Australia) Jack Arkinstall	2	2	4
(United States) Tony Trabert	6	6	6
(United Kingdom) Mike Davies	4	2	2
(Australia) Ashley Cooper	6	6	6
(Peru) Alex Olmedo	4	4	4

Quarterfinals
(Australia) Ken Rosewall	7	6	6
(Australia) Malcolm Anderson	5	4	3
(Australia) Frank Sedgman	10	6	6
(Spain) Andrés Gimeno	8	4	2
(Australia) Lew Hoad	6	6	1	6
(Ecuador) Pancho Segura	1	3	6	1
(United States) Tony Trabert	10	7	6
(Australia) Ashley Cooper	8	5	0

Semifinals
(Australia) Ken Rosewall	11	7	6	6
(Australia) Frank Sedgman	9	5	8	4
(Australia) Lew Hoad	6	6	7	7
(United States) Tony Trabert	4	4	9	5

Final
(Australia) Ken Rosewall	6	2	6	6
(Australia) Lew Hoad	2	6	2	1

== 1961 ==
Round of 16
(United States) Pancho Gonzales	6	6	4	6
(Australia) Malcolm Anderson	2	4	6	2
(United States) Barry MacKay (tennis)	6	6	1	7
(United States) Earl Buchholz	3	4	6	5
(United States) Tony Trabert	13	6	6
(Denmark) Kurt Nielsen	11	1	1
(Spain) Andrés Gimeno	6	3	6	6
(Peru) Alex Olmedo	3	6	0	2
(Chile) Luis Ayala	6	6	4	6
(Australia) Lew Hoad	3	2	6	2
(Ecuador) Pancho Segura	6	6	6
(United Kingdom) Mike Davies	1	4	3
(Australia) Ashley Cooper	6	6	6
(France) Paul Rémy	2	3	1
(Australia) Ken Rosewall	6	6	6
(France) Robert Haillet	1	4	3

Quarterfinals
(United States) Pancho Gonzales	6	6	7
(United States) Barry MacKay (tennis)	3	4	5
(United States) Tony Trabert	6	4	7	10
(Spain) Andrés Gimeno	2	6	5	8
(Chile) Luis Ayala	0	8	6	3
(Ecuador) Pancho Segura	6	10	1	6
(Australia) Ashley Cooper	2	7	6	4	2
(Australia) Ken Rosewall	6	5	4	6	6

Semifinals
(United States) Pancho Gonzales	6	6	6
(United States) Tony Trabert	3	0	4
(Ecuador) Pancho Segura	6	1	4	5
(Australia) Ken Rosewall	4	6	6	7

Final
(United States) Pancho Gonzales	6	4	3	6
(Australia) Ken Rosewall	2	6	6	8

== 1962 ==
Round of 16
(Spain) Andrés Gimeno	6	6	6
(France) Robert Haillet	4	4	1
(Peru) Alex Olmedo	4	5	6	6	6
(United States) Barry MacKay (tennis)	6	7	2	2	4
(Australia) Malcolm Anderson	6	3	9	6
(United States) Tony Trabert	3	6	7	0
(Ecuador) Pancho Segura	6	6	6
(France) Paul Rémy	1	1	2
(United Kingdom) Mike Davies	6	8	7
(Australia) Lew Hoad	3	6	5
(Australia) Ashley Cooper	4	6	7	6
(Chile) Luis Ayala	6	4	5	3
(United States) Earl Buchholz	6	6	6
(Denmark) Kurt Nielsen	4	3	3
(Australia) Ken Rosewall	6	6	6
(France) Jean-Claude Molinari	4	2	2

Quarterfinals
(Spain) Andrés Gimeno	6	6	6
(Peru) Alex Olmedo	3	2	2
(Australia) Malcolm Anderson	6	6	7
(Ecuador) Pancho Segura	1	4	5
(United Kingdom) Mike Davies	4	3	2
(Australia) Ashley Cooper	6	6	6
(United States) Earl Buchholz	0	5	6	3
(Australia) Ken Rosewall	6	7	4	6

Semifinals
(Spain) Andrés Gimeno	6	6	4	6
(Australia) Malcolm Anderson	4	2	6	2
(Australia) Ashley Cooper	4	3	6	3
(Australia) Ken Rosewall	6	6	3	6

Final
(Spain) Andrés Gimeno	6	2	5	2
(Australia) Ken Rosewall	3	6	7	6

== 1963 ==
Round of 16
(Australia) Rod Laver	6	6	6
(Denmark) Kurt Nielsen	1	1	3
(United States) Earl Buchholz	6	9	6	6
(United States) Tony Trabert	1	11	4	4
(France) Robert Haillet	w/o
(United Kingdom) Mike Davies
(Australia) Frank Sedgman	6	4	6	10
(Chile) Luis Ayala	4	6	3	8
(United States) Barry MacKay (tennis)	14	14	1	6	6
(Spain) Andrés Gimeno	16	12	6	4	4
(Australia) Lew Hoad	5	9	6	6	6
(Peru) Alex Olmedo	7	11	2	4	1

Quarterfinals
(Australia) Rod Laver	6	6	6
(United States) Earl Buchholz	3	3	4
(France) Robert Haillet	1	2	2
(Australia) Frank Sedgman	6	6	6
(United States) Barry MacKay (tennis)	2	2	4
(Australia) Lew Hoad	6	6	6
(Australia) Ken Rosewall	6	6	6
(Australia) Malcolm Anderson	0	2	2

Semifinals
(Australia) Rod Laver	6	6	6
(Australia) Frank Sedgman	4	3	2
(Australia) Lew Hoad	8	2	3
(Australia) Ken Rosewall	10	6	6

Final
(Australia) Rod Laver	8	4	7	3	4
(Australia) Ken Rosewall	6	6	5	6	6

== 1964 ==
Round of 16
(Australia) Frank Sedgman	6	6	6
(France) Jean-Claude Molinari	4	4	2
(Peru) Alex Olmedo	6	6	6
(Denmark) Kurt Nielsen	3	2	2
(Australia) Lew Hoad	6	7	3	6
(France) Robert Haillet	4	5	6	1
(United States) Earl Buchholz	4	7	6	6
(Chile) Luis Ayala	6	5	3	0

Quarterfinals
(Australia) Frank Sedgman	3	4	4
(Spain) Andrés Gimeno	6	6	6
(Peru) Alex Olmedo	4	4	6	3
(Australia) Rod Laver	6	6	3	6
(Australia) Lew Hoad	2	1	6	3
(United States) Pancho Gonzales	6	6	3	6
(United States) Earl Buchholz	3	4	0
(Australia) Ken Rosewall	6	6	6

Semifinals
(Spain) Andrés Gimeno	12	8	2	3
(Australia) Rod Laver	14	6	6	6
(United States) Pancho Gonzales	6	2	7	5	2
(Australia) Ken Rosewall	4	6	5	7	6

Final
(Australia) Rod Laver	3	5	6	3
(Australia) Ken Rosewall	6	7	3	6

== 1965 ==
Round of 16
(Australia) Frank Sedgman	6	6	6
(France) Robert Haillet	3	2	3
(Australia) Malcolm Anderson	6	7	6	6
(Denmark) Kurt Nielsen	4	9	3	3
(Ecuador) Pancho Segura	13	6	3	6
(France) Jean-Claude Molinari	11	0	6	2
(Chile) Luis Ayala	?	?	?
(United Kingdom) Mike Davies	?	?	?

Quarterfinals
(Australia) Rod Laver	11	6	6
(Australia) Frank Sedgman	9	4	3
(Spain) Andrés Gimeno	11	6	3	9	2
(Australia) Malcolm Anderson	13	1	6	7	6
(United States) Earl Buchholz	6	6	8
(Ecuador) Pancho Segura	3	3	6
(Australia) Ken Rosewall	7	6	6
(Chile) Luis Ayala	5	2	2

Semifinals
(Australia) Rod Laver	11	8	2	6
(Australia) Malcolm Anderson	9	6	6	0
(United States) Earl Buchholz	6	4	2	3
(Australia) Ken Rosewall	4	6	6	6

Final
(Australia) Rod Laver	3	2	4
(Australia) Ken Rosewall	6	6	6

== 1966 ==
Round of 16
(Australia) Malcolm Anderson	6	6	6
(France) Pierre Barthès	4	2	4

Quarterfinals
(Australia) Rod Laver	6	6	6
(France) Jean-Claude Molinari	3	2	0
(United States) Earl Buchholz	5	6	6	6
(France) Robert Haillet	7	4	3	1
(Spain) Andrés Gimeno	2	6	6	6
(Australia) Malcolm Anderson	6	2	1	4
(Australia) Ken Rosewall	7	8	6
(United Kingdom) Mike Davies	5	6	4

Semifinals
(Australia) Rod Laver	4	6	6	6
(United States) Earl Buchholz	6	4	0	3
(Spain) Andrés Gimeno	3	4	6	2
(Australia) Ken Rosewall	6	6	4	6

Final
(Australia) Rod Laver	3	2	12
(Australia) Ken Rosewall	6	6	14

== 1967 ==
Round of 16
(Spain) Andrés Gimeno	7	6	6
(France) Robert Haillet	5	1	2
(Australia) Lew Hoad	4	4	6	6	9
(France) Pierre Barthès	6	6	4	4	7
(Australia) Fred Stolle	6	6	8
(France) Jean-Claude Molinari	0	4	6
(United States) Earl Buchholz	6	6	6
(United States) Dennis Ralston	4	4	2

Quarterfinals
(Australia) Ken Rosewall	6	6	7
(United Kingdom) Mike Davies	2	1	5
(Spain) Andrés Gimeno	6	2	6	8
(Australia) Lew Hoad	1	6	3	6
(Australia) Fred Stolle	8	11	6
(United States) Earl Buchholz	6	9	1
(United States) Barry MacKay (tennis)	2	6	4	4
(Australia) Rod Laver	6	3	6	6

Semifinals
(Australia) Ken Rosewall	2	3	4
(Spain) Andrés Gimeno	6	6	6
(Australia) Fred Stolle	6	3	4	4
(Australia) Rod Laver	4	6	6	6

Final
(Spain) Andrés Gimeno	4	6	6	2
(Australia) Rod Laver	6	8	4	6

== See also ==
- U.S. Pro Tennis Championships draws, 1927–1945
- U.S. Pro Tennis Championships draws, 1946–1967
- Wembley Professional Championships draws
