= German Pro Championships =

Defunct tennis tournament
- Tour: Pro Tour
- Founded: 1911
- Abolished: 1952
- Location: Berlin, Germany
- Surface: Clay / Outdoor

The German Pro Championships was a major professional men's tennis tournament. There were similar competitions in other countries, and also the World Pro Championships. After 1945 other names were used like German International in 1951 and Berlin Pro Championships in 1952.

== Singles ==
Year	Champion	Runner-up
1911	(Austria-Hungary) Karel Koželuh	(Russian Empire) Roman Najuch
1912 (Note: Only German Professionals participated)	(German Empire) Willi Hannemann	Unknown
1928	(Weimar Republic) Roman Najuch	Hermann Bartelt
1929 (Note: Round Robin format)	(Weimar Republic) Roman Najuch	Hermann Bartelt
1930	(France) Martin Plaa	(Weimar Republic) Hans Nüsslein
1931	(Weimar Republic) Hans Nüsslein	(Weimar Republic) Roman Najuch
1932	(France) Martin Plaa	(United States) Bill Tilden
1933	(Nazi Germany) Hans Nüsslein	(United States) Bill Tilden
1934	(Nazi Germany) Hans Nüsslein	(Nazi Germany) Heinz Messerschmidt
1935	(Nazi Germany) Hans Nüsslein	(Nazi Germany) Eduard Goritschnig
1936	(Nazi Germany) Hans Nüsslein	(France) Robert Ramillon
1937	(United States) Bill Tilden	(Nazi Germany) Hans Nüsslein
1938	(Nazi Germany) Hans Nüsslein	(France) Robert Ramillon
1951	(Ecuador) Pancho Segura	(United States) Carl Earn
1952	(United States) Pancho Gonzales	(United States) Don Budge

In 1932 and 1933 it was the World Professional Championship.

== See also ==
- Major professional tennis tournaments before the Open Era
