= Queen's Club Pro =

Defunct tennis tournament
- Founded: 1927
- Abolished: 1928
- Editions: 2
- Location: London; England
- Venue: Queen's Club
- Surface: Clay

The Queen's Club Pro tennis tournament was held in 1927 and 1928. It went by the name of the Professional Championship of the World in 1927, gaining the tournament great notability. The tournament was held in October on clay courts, at the Queen's Club, with the hopes that it would become a permanent fixture like the amateur championships (Grand Slams), and be considered one of the major pro events like the US Pro and Bristol Cup. It was discontinued and wasn't held in 1929.

== Past finals ==
=== Singles ===
Year	Champion	Runner-up	Score
1927	(United Kingdom) Dan Maskell	(United Kingdom) Charles R Read	6–3, 6–3, 6–4
1928	(France) Robert Ramillon	(Republic of Ireland) Edmund Burke	6–1, 6–3, 5–7, 6–4

== See also ==
- Major professional tennis tournaments before the Open Era
