= Haillet =

Haillet is a French surname. Notable people with the surname include:

- Jean-Louis Haillet (born 1954), French tennis player
- Robert Haillet (1931–2011), French tennis player
