= Wembley Professional Championships draws =

Listed below are the draws for the singles event of Wembley Professional Championships men's tennis tournament held during the professional era from 1934 until 1967.

== 1934 ==
Round robin		W–L	(United States) Ellsworth Vines	(Germany) Hans Nüsslein	(United States) Bill Tilden	(France) Martin Plaa	(United States) Bruce Barnes	(United Kingdom) Dan Maskell
1.	(United States) Ellsworth Vines	5–0		4–6, 7–5, 6–3, 8–6	9–7, 7–5, 6–2	7–5, 6–3, 6–3	8–6, 6–4, 9–7	6–3, 6–0, 6–3
2.	(Germany) Hans Nüsslein	4–1	6–4, 5–7, 3–6, 6–8		3–6, 6–1, 5–7, 6–2, 6–4	6–4, 6–0, 6–1	6–2, 6–0, 6–4	6–2, 6–1, 6–1
3.	(United States) Bill Tilden	3–2	7–9, 5–7, 2–6	6–3, 1–6, 7–5, 2–6, 4–6		7–5, 6–3, 6–3	6–0, 6–3, 3–6, 6–1	6–3, 6–3, 6–4
4.	(France) Martin Plaa	2–3	5–7, 3–6, 3–6	4–6, 0–6, 1–6	5–7, 3–6, 3–6		3–6, 2–6, 6–4, 6–4, 6–0	6–3, 6–1, 8–6
5.	(United States) Bruce Barnes	1–4	6–8, 4–6, 7–9	2–6, 0–6, 4–6	0–6, 3–6, 6–3, 1–6	6–3, 6–2, 4–6, 4–6, 0–6		6–3, 6–0, 8–6
6.	(United Kingdom) Dan Maskell	0–5	3–6, 0–6, 3–6	2–6, 1–6, 1–6	3–6, 3–6, 4–6	3–6, 1–6, 6–8	3–6, 0–6, 6–8	

== 1935 ==
First round
(United Kingdom) Dan Maskell	6	7	6
(France) Robert Ramillon	2	5	2
(United States) Lester Stoefen	11	6	6
(France) Martin Plaa	9	4	4

Quarterfinals
(United States) Ellsworth Vines	6	6	6
(Republic of Ireland) Albert Burke	2	1	0
(United Kingdom) Dan Maskell	2	7	2
(United States) Lester Stoefen	6	5	6
(Germany) Hans Nüsslein	6	6	6
(United States) George Lott	0	3	0
(United States) Bill Tilden	6	6	6
(Republic of Ireland) Edmund Burke	3	3	3

Semifinals
(United States) Ellsworth Vines	4	6	6	6	9
(United States) Lester Stoefen	6	2	8	1	7
(Germany) Hans Nüsslein	6	3	6	3
(United States) Bill Tilden	8	6	0	6

Final
(United States) Ellsworth Vines	6	6	5	3	6
(United States) Bill Tilden	1	3	7	6	3

== 1937 ==
Quarterfinals
(Germany) Hans Nüsslein	6	6	6
(France) Martin Plaa	4	2	3
(United States) Lester Stoefen	8	1	6	8	7
(France) Robert Ramillon	6	6	1	10	5
(United States) Bill Tilden	6	6	6
(United Kingdom) T. Jeffery	0	1	2
(France) Henri Cochet	6	6	6
(United Kingdom) Dan Maskell	4	1	3

Semifinals
(Germany) Hans Nüsslein	6	6	6
(United States) Lester Stoefen	3	4	3
(United States) Bill Tilden	6	6	6
(France) Henri Cochet	3	2	3

Final
(Germany) Hans Nüsslein	6	3	6	2	6
(United States) Bill Tilden	3	6	3	6	2

== 1939 ==
Round robin		W-L	(United States) Don Budge	(Germany) Hans Nüsslein	(United States) Bill Tilden	(United States) Ellsworth Vines
1.	(United States) Don Budge	3–0		13–11, 2–6, 6–4	6–2, 6–2	6–4, 6–3
2.	(Germany) Hans Nüsslein	1–2	11–13, 6–2, 4–6		6–3, 6–2	7–5, 3–6, 4–6
3.	(United States) Bill Tilden	1–2	2–6, 2–6	3–6, 2–6		6–3, 10–8
4.	(United States) Ellsworth Vines	1–2	4–6, 3–6	5–7, 6–3, 6–4	3–6, 8–10	

== 1949 ==
First round
(United States) Jack Kramer	6	6
R. Simon	1	0
(Sweden) Kalle Schröder	6	2	6
(Italy) Francesco Romanoni	1	6	3
(Egypt) M. Ali Moubarek	6	2	6
J. Pearce	4	6	3
(Ecuador) Pancho Segura	6	6
(United Kingdom) Derek Bocquet	0	3
(United States) Don Budge	6	9
(Netherlands) Jan de Mos	2	7
(Australia) Dinny Pails	6	6
(Switzerland) Jean Brechbuhl	0	2
W. Werthmuller	6	6
(France) Henri Vissault	2	1
(United States) Bobby Riggs	6	6
(Spain) Esteban Gimeno	2	4

Quarterfinals
(United States) Jack Kramer	6	6
(Sweden) Kalle Schröder	1	1
(Egypt) M. Ali Moubarek	2	1
(Ecuador) Pancho Segura	6	6
(United States) Don Budge	6	4	6
(Australia) Dinny Pails	3	6	3
W. Werthmuller	2	3
(United States) Bobby Riggs	6	6

Semifinals
(United States) Jack Kramer	3	6	6	3	6
(Ecuador) Pancho Segura	6	3	3	6	3
(United States) Don Budge	6	2	2	5
(United States) Bobby Riggs	4	6	6	7

Final
(United States) Jack Kramer	2	6	6	6
(United States) Bobby Riggs	6	4	3	4

== 1950 ==
First round
(United Kingdom) Frank Wilde	4	6	6
F. Schuermeier	6	4	4
(West Germany) Hans Nüsslein	6	6
(United Kingdom) Dan Maskell	1	3

Quarterfinals
(United States) Bobby Riggs	6	6
(Sweden) Kalle Schröder	3	2
(United States) Welby Van Horn	6	6
(United Kingdom) Frank Wilde	2	4
(West Germany) Hans Nüsslein	4	3
(United States) Don Budge	6	6
(Netherlands) Jan de Mos	3	4
(United States) Pancho Gonzales	6	6

Semifinals
(United States) Bobby Riggs	4	6	2	3
(United States) Welby Van Horn	6	2	6	6
(United States) Don Budge	6	1	2	2
(United States) Pancho Gonzales	4	6	6	6

Final
(United States) Welby Van Horn	3	3	2
(United States) Pancho Gonzales	6	6	6

== 1951 ==
First round
(Ecuador) Pancho Segura	6	6
(Netherlands) Jan de Mos	1	4
(United Kingdom) Fred Perry	6	6
(Egypt) M. Ali Moubarek	1	3
(West Germany) Hans Nüsslein	6	6
(Italy) Francesco Romanoni	1	3
(United States) Welby Van Horn	8	6
(United Kingdom) Derek Bocquet	6	4
(United States) Pancho Gonzales	6	6
(United Kingdom) William Moss	0	2
(United States) Carl Earn	6	6
(United Kingdom) Frank Wilde	0	2
(United States) Bobby Riggs	6	6
(United States) G. Rogers	1	0
(United States) Frank Kovacs	6	6
(Sweden) Kalle Schröder	1	4

Quarterfinals
(Ecuador) Pancho Segura	6	8
(United Kingdom) Fred Perry	2	6
(West Germany) Hans Nüsslein	2	6	1
(United States) Welby Van Horn	6	3	6
(United States) Pancho Gonzales	6	8
(United States) Carl Earn	1	6
(United States) Bobby Riggs	1	6	3
(United States) Frank Kovacs	6	1	6

Semifinals
(Ecuador) Pancho Segura	6	6	6
(United States) Welby Van Horn	2	2	2
(United States) Pancho Gonzales	6	6	6
(United States) Frank Kovacs	1	3	3

Final
(Ecuador) Pancho Segura	2	2	6	4
(United States) Pancho Gonzales	6	6	2	6

== 1952 ==
First round
(United States) Jack Kramer	6	6
(United Kingdom) William Moss	1	2
(Sweden) Kalle Schröder	6	6
(Austria) M. Stachowitsch	4	1
(United States) Bobby Riggs	6	6
H. Hounder	1	3
(United States) Don Budge	6	6
(Egypt) M. Ali Moubarek	2	2
(Ecuador) Pancho Segura	6	6
(West Germany) Hans Nüsslein	1	3
(Australia) Dinny Pails	6	6
(United Kingdom) Paddy Roberts	0	1
(United Kingdom) Fred Perry	6	6
(Switzerland) Jean Brechbuhl	4	2
(United States) Pancho Gonzales	6	6
(Netherlands) Jan de Mos	1	1

Quarterfinals
(United States) Jack Kramer	6	6
(Sweden) Kalle Schröder	2	2
(United States) Bobby Riggs	2	4
(United States) Don Budge	6	6
(Ecuador) Pancho Segura	6	6
(Australia) Dinny Pails	4	0
(United Kingdom) Fred Perry	1	0
(United States) Pancho Gonzales	6	6

Semifinals
(United States) Jack Kramer	6	4	7	6
(United States) Don Budge	1	6	5	3
(Ecuador) Pancho Segura	8	5	2
(United States) Pancho Gonzales	10	7	6

Final
(United States) Jack Kramer	6	6	2	4	5
(United States) Pancho Gonzales	3	3	6	6	7

== 1953 ==
First round
(United States) Pancho Gonzales	6	6
H. Hounder	4	1
(West Germany) Hans Nüsslein	6	6
(Sweden) Kalle Schröder	2	1
(Ecuador) Pancho Segura	6	6
(West Germany) Rudolph Probst	2	2
(Netherlands) Jan de Mos	6	6
G. Bradley	0	2
(United States) Bobby Riggs	6	4	6
(Australia) Peter Cawthorn	1	6	1
(United States) Don Budge	6	6
(Socialist Federal Republic of Yugoslavia) Ljubisa Radovanović	1	0
(Australia) Don Tregonning	6	2	6
(United Kingdom) William Moss	1	6	4
(Australia) Frank Sedgman	6	6
(West Germany) Kurt Pohmann	2	1

Quarterfinals
(United States) Pancho Gonzales	6	6
(West Germany) Hans Nüsslein	4	4
(Ecuador) Pancho Segura	6	6
(Netherlands) Jan de Mos	2	2
(United States) Bobby Riggs	6	4	8
(United States) Don Budge	0	6	10
(Australia) Don Tregonning	0	3
(Australia) Frank Sedgman	6	6

Semifinals
(United States) Pancho Gonzales	6	9	7
(Ecuador) Pancho Segura	1	7	5
(United States) Don Budge	5	0	1
(Australia) Frank Sedgman	7	6	6

Final
(United States) Pancho Gonzales	1	2	2
(Australia) Frank Sedgman	6	6	6

== 1956 ==
First round
(Ecuador) Pancho Segura	6	6
(West Germany) Hans Nüsslein	2	3
(Netherlands) Jan de Mos	6	6
(Sweden) Kalle Schröder	0	1
(Australia) Peter Cawthorn	6	6
(United Kingdom) William Moss	3	0
(United States) Tony Trabert	6	6
(Australia) George Worthington	3	4

Quarterfinals
(United States) Pancho Gonzales	6	6
(Australia) Rex Hartwig	2	3
(Ecuador) Pancho Segura	6	6
(Netherlands) Jan de Mos	0	2
(Australia) Peter Cawthorn	5	4
(United States) Tony Trabert	7	6
(United Kingdom) Tony Mottram	2	2
(Australia) Frank Sedgman	6	6

Semifinals
(United States) Pancho Gonzales	6	6	6
(Ecuador) Pancho Segura	4	2	2
(United States) Tony Trabert	6	1	2
(Australia) Frank Sedgman	8	6	6

Final
(United States) Pancho Gonzales	4	11	11	9
(Australia) Frank Sedgman	6	9	9	7

== 1957 ==
First round
(Ecuador) Pancho Segura	w/o
(Spain) L. Hernandez
(Australia) George Worthington	6	6
(Netherlands) Jan de Mos	1	1
(Australia) Peter Cawthorn	0	6	6
(Italy) Rolando Del Bello	6	4	1
(Australia) Ken Rosewall	6	6
(France) Jacques Iemetti	1	1

Quarterfinals
(United States) Pancho Gonzales	6	6
(United Kingdom) William Moss	0	0
(Ecuador) Pancho Segura	6	6
(Australia) George Worthington	2	4
(Australia) Peter Cawthorn	2	1
(Australia) Ken Rosewall	6	6
(United States) Jack Kramer	6	10
(Australia) Lew Hoad	1	8

Semifinals
(United States) Pancho Gonzales	9	10	4
(Ecuador) Pancho Segura	11	12	6
(Australia) Ken Rosewall	6	6	6
(United States) Jack Kramer	1	3	2

Final
(Ecuador) Pancho Segura	6	3	4	6	4
(Australia) Ken Rosewall	1	6	6	3	6

== 1958 ==
First round
(Australia) Frank Sedgman	3	6	6
(Australia) Jack Arkinstall	6	1	4
(Ecuador) Pancho Segura	w/o
(Australia) Lew Hoad
(United States) Jack Kramer	3	6	6
(Australia) George Worthington	6	3	3
(United States) Tony Trabert	6	8
(France) Paul Rémy	2	6

Quarterfinals
(United States) Pancho Gonzales	6	6
(United Kingdom) William Moss	2	4
(Australia) Frank Sedgman	6	6
(Ecuador) Pancho Segura	2	4
(United States) Jack Kramer	5	4
(United States) Tony Trabert	7	6
(Australia) Peter Cawthorn	3	4
(Australia) Ken Rosewall	6	6

Semifinals
(United States) Pancho Gonzales	6	3	8	4
(Australia) Frank Sedgman	4	6	10	6
(United States) Tony Trabert	7	1	6	1	7
(Australia) Ken Rosewall	5	6	1	6	5

Final
(Australia) Frank Sedgman	6	6	6
(United States) Tony Trabert	4	3	4

== 1959 ==
First round
(Australia) Lew Hoad	6	6
(United States) Welby Van Horn	0	2
(Ecuador) Pancho Segura	6	7
(France) Paul Rémy	2	5
(United States) Tony Trabert	6	6
(Australia) George Worthington	2	4
(Australia) Mervyn Rose	6	6
(West Germany) Rudolf Bottke	3	1
(Australia) Ashley Cooper	6	4	6
(Australia) Jack Arkinstall	3	6	2
(Australia) Ken Rosewall	8	6
(United States) Jack Kramer	6	4
(Australia) Mal Anderson	6	6
(Australia) Peter Cawthorn	4	4
(Australia) Frank Sedgman	6	6
(Australia) Peter Molloy	2	2

Quarterfinals
(Australia) Lew Hoad	8	3	4
(Ecuador) Pancho Segura	6	6	6
(United States) Tony Trabert	6	6
(Australia) Mervyn Rose	2	3
(Australia) Ashley Cooper	2	3
(Australia) Ken Rosewall	6	6
(Australia) Mal Anderson	6	6
(Australia) Frank Sedgman	1	4

Semifinals
(Ecuador) Pancho Segura	6	9	6
(United States) Tony Trabert	2	7	2
(Australia) Ken Rosewall	5	6	6	3	4
(Australia) Mal Anderson	7	2	4	6	6

Final
(Ecuador) Pancho Segura	6	4	6	3	6
(Australia) Mal Anderson	4	6	3	6	8

== 1960 ==
First round
(Australia) Ken Rosewall	6	6
(Australia) Peter Cawthorn	3	2
(United States) Tony Trabert	6	6
(France) Robert Haillet	3	3
(Peru) Alex Olmedo	6	9
(Australia) Mal Anderson	3	7
(Australia) Ashley Cooper	6	6
(United Kingdom) Mike Davies	3	3
(Spain) Andrés Gimeno	6	6
(Australia) Jack Arkinstall	2	3
(Australia) Frank Sedgman	6	6
(France) Paul Rémy	3	4
(Ecuador) Pancho Segura	6	8
(Denmark) Kurt Nielsen	3	6

Quarterfinals
(Australia) Ken Rosewall	6	6
(United States) Tony Trabert	4	3
(Peru) Alex Olmedo	9	6
(Australia) Ashley Cooper	7	3
(Spain) Andrés Gimeno	3	12
(Australia) Frank Sedgman	6	14
(Ecuador) Pancho Segura	6	1	6
(Australia) Lew Hoad	2	6	3

Semifinals
(Australia) Ken Rosewall	6	6	6
(Peru) Alex Olmedo	0	0	3
(Australia) Frank Sedgman	6	3	3	6	4
(Ecuador) Pancho Segura	4	6	6	4	6

Final
(Australia) Ken Rosewall	5	8	6	6
(Ecuador) Pancho Segura	7	6	1	3

== 1961 ==
First round
(Australia) Ken Rosewall	6	6
(Peru) Alex Olmedo	3	4
(Australia) Ashley Cooper	2	18	6
(Denmark) Kurt Nielsen	6	16	3
(Ecuador) Pancho Segura	6	6
(France) Robert Haillet	2	2
(United States) Barry MacKay	9	7
(Chile) Luis Ayala	7	5
(Australia) Lew Hoad	6	6
(United States) Earl Buchholz	4	3
(United States) Tony Trabert	6	6
(Australia) Mal Anderson	4	4
(Spain) Andrés Gimeno	6	3	6
(Australia) George Worthington	1	6	2
(United States) Pancho Gonzales	6	6
(United Kingdom) Mike Davies	2	3

Quarterfinals
(Australia) Ken Rosewall	6	6
(Australia) Ashley Cooper	1	4
(Ecuador) Pancho Segura	6	6
(United States) Barry MacKay	3	2
(Australia) Lew Hoad	6	3	6
(United States) Tony Trabert	4	6	3
(Spain) Andrés Gimeno	3	4
(United States) Pancho Gonzales	6	6

Semifinals
(Australia) Ken Rosewall	6	6	6
(Ecuador) Pancho Segura	4	4	3
(Australia) Lew Hoad	4	13	6	6
(United States) Pancho Gonzales	6	11	3	2

Final
(Australia) Ken Rosewall	6	3	6	6
(Australia) Lew Hoad	3	6	2	3

== 1962 ==
First round
(Spain) Andrés Gimeno	6	8
(Denmark) Kurt Nielsen	3	6
(United States) Earl Buchholz	6	6
(France) Jean-Claude Molinari	2	2
(Australia) Lew Hoad	6	6
(Australia) George Worthington	2	3
(United States) Tony Trabert	6	6
(Peru) Alex Olmedo	4	4
(United States) Barry MacKay	6	6
(Chile) Luis Ayala	3	4
(Ecuador) Pancho Segura	6	6
(France) Robert Haillet	4	4
(Australia) Ashley Cooper	7	3	6
(United Kingdom) Mike Davies	5	6	1
(Australia) Ken Rosewall	6	1
(Australia) Mal Anderson	0	0	rtd.

Quarterfinals
(Spain) Andrés Gimeno	7	3	4
(United States) Earl Buchholz	5	6	6
(Australia) Lew Hoad	6	4	7
(United States) Tony Trabert	4	6	5
(United States) Barry MacKay	4	7	5
(Ecuador) Pancho Segura	6	5	7
(Australia) Ashley Cooper	1	8	6
(Australia) Ken Rosewall	6	6	8

Semifinals
(United States) Earl Buchholz	10	6	7	3	2
(Australia) Lew Hoad	12	3	5	6	6
(Ecuador) Pancho Segura	4	6	6	5	4
(Australia) Ken Rosewall	6	4	3	7	6

Final
(Australia) Lew Hoad	4	7	13	5
(Australia) Ken Rosewall	6	5	15	7

== 1963 ==
First round
(United States) Tony Trabert	6	6
(Denmark) Kurt Nielsen	4	4
(Peru) Alex Olmedo	7	6	10
(Australia) Frank Sedgman	9	3	8
(Australia) Mal Anderson	6	6
(United States) Barry MacKay	3	3
(Australia) Lew Hoad	6	6
(Chile) Luis Ayala	2	3
(Spain) Andrés Gimeno	7	6
(United Kingdom) Mike Davies	5	2
(United States) Earl Buchholz	7	6
(France) Robert Haillet	5	3

Quarterfinals
(Australia) Ken Rosewall	6	6
(United States) Tony Trabert	2	3
(Peru) Alex Olmedo	6	6
(Australia) Mal Anderson	1	2
(Australia) Lew Hoad	6	2	8
(Spain) Andrés Gimeno	3	6	6
(United States) Earl Buchholz	6	6
(Australia) Rod Laver	1	4

Semifinals
(Australia) Ken Rosewall	6	6	6
(Peru) Alex Olmedo	1	2	1
(Australia) Lew Hoad	6	6	8	7	10
(United States) Earl Buchholz	1	3	10	9	8

Final
(Australia) Ken Rosewall	6	6	4	6
(Australia) Lew Hoad	4	2	6	3

== 1964 ==
First round
(Australia) Frank Sedgman	6	6
(France) Robert Haillet	2	3
(United States) Earl Buchholz	6	6
(Chile) Luis Ayala	4	4

Quarterfinals
(Australia) Ken Rosewall	6	6
(Australia) Lew Hoad	3	2
(Spain) Andrés Gimeno	5	2
(Australia) Frank Sedgman	7	6
(United States) Earl Buchholz	3	4
(United States) Pancho Gonzales	6	6
(Peru) Alex Olmedo	4	4
(Australia) Rod Laver	6	6

Semifinals
(Australia) Ken Rosewall	7	6	6
(Australia) Frank Sedgman	5	4	4
(United States) Pancho Gonzales	2	6	6	3
(Australia) Rod Laver	6	3	8	6

Final
(Australia) Ken Rosewall	5	6	7	6	6
(Australia) Rod Laver	7	4	5	8	8

Preliminary round:
(France) Robert Haillet def. (Denmark) Kurt Nielsen 4–6, 6–4, 6–1
(Chile) Luis Ayala def. (United Kingdom) Roger Becker 6–2, 6–3

== 1965 ==
First round
(United Kingdom) Mike Davies	5	6	7
(Chile) Luis Ayala	7	2	5
(Ecuador) Pancho Segura	6	6
(France) Robert Haillet	4	2

Quarterfinals
(Australia) Rod Laver	4	9	6
(Australia) Frank Sedgman	6	7	3
(United States) Earl Buchholz	6	6
(United Kingdom) Mike Davies	2	3
(Ecuador) Pancho Segura	4	2
(Spain) Andrés Gimeno	6	6
(Australia) Mal Anderson	2	4
(Australia) Ken Rosewall	6	6

Semifinals
(Australia) Rod Laver	6	6	10
(United States) Earl Buchholz	1	3	8
(Spain) Andrés Gimeno	2	1	6	6	6
(Australia) Ken Rosewall	6	6	0	3	3

Final
(Australia) Rod Laver	6	6	6
(Spain) Andrés Gimeno	2	3	4

== 1966 ==
First round
(United Kingdom) Mike Davies	4	6	6
(France) Robert Haillet	6	1	1
(Australia) Lew Hoad	6	6
(Denmark) Kurt Nielsen	0	4

Quarterfinals
(Australia) Rod Laver	6	6
(France) Pierre Barthès	2	4
(United States) Earl Buchholz	4	6	3
(United Kingdom) Mike Davies	6	3	6
(Australia) Lew Hoad	8	6
(Spain) Andrés Gimeno	6	4
(Australia) Mal Anderson	2	2
(Australia) Ken Rosewall	6	6

Semifinals
(Australia) Rod Laver	6	6	6
(United Kingdom) Mike Davies	3	1	2
(Australia) Lew Hoad	3	6	9	1	4
(Australia) Ken Rosewall	6	3	7	6	6

Final
(Australia) Rod Laver	6	6	6
(Australia) Ken Rosewall	2	2	3

Preliminary round:
(France) Robert Haillet def. (United Kingdom) Roger Becker 6–3, 6–0
(Denmark) Kurt Nielsen def. (France) Jean-Claude Molinari 6–2, 6–2

== 1967 ==
First round
(United States) Dennis Ralston	6	1	10
(Australia) Fred Stolle	1	6	8
(Australia) Owen Davidson	6	6
(United Kingdom) Mike Davies	3	3
(United States) Earl Buchholz	4	6	6
(Australia) Lew Hoad	6	4	2
(Spain) Andrés Gimeno	3	6	10
(France) Pierre Barthès	6	4	8

Quarterfinals
(Australia) Rod Laver	6	6
(United States) Barry MacKay	3	1
(United States) Dennis Ralston
(Australia) Owen Davidson	w/o
(United States) Earl Buchholz	5	6	2
(Spain) Andrés Gimeno	7	4	6
(United Kingdom) Alan Mills	3	3
(Australia) Ken Rosewall	6	6

Semifinals
(Australia) Rod Laver	6	3	6	7
(Australia) Owen Davidson	3	6	2	5
(Spain) Andrés Gimeno	3	2	8	7	4
(Australia) Ken Rosewall	6	6	6	5	6

Final
(Australia) Rod Laver	2	6	1	8	6
(Australia) Ken Rosewall	6	1	6	6	2

== See also ==
- U.S. Pro Tennis Championships draws, 1927–1945
- U.S. Pro Tennis Championships draws, 1946–1967
- French Pro Championship draws
