= Martin Plaa =

French tennis player and coach

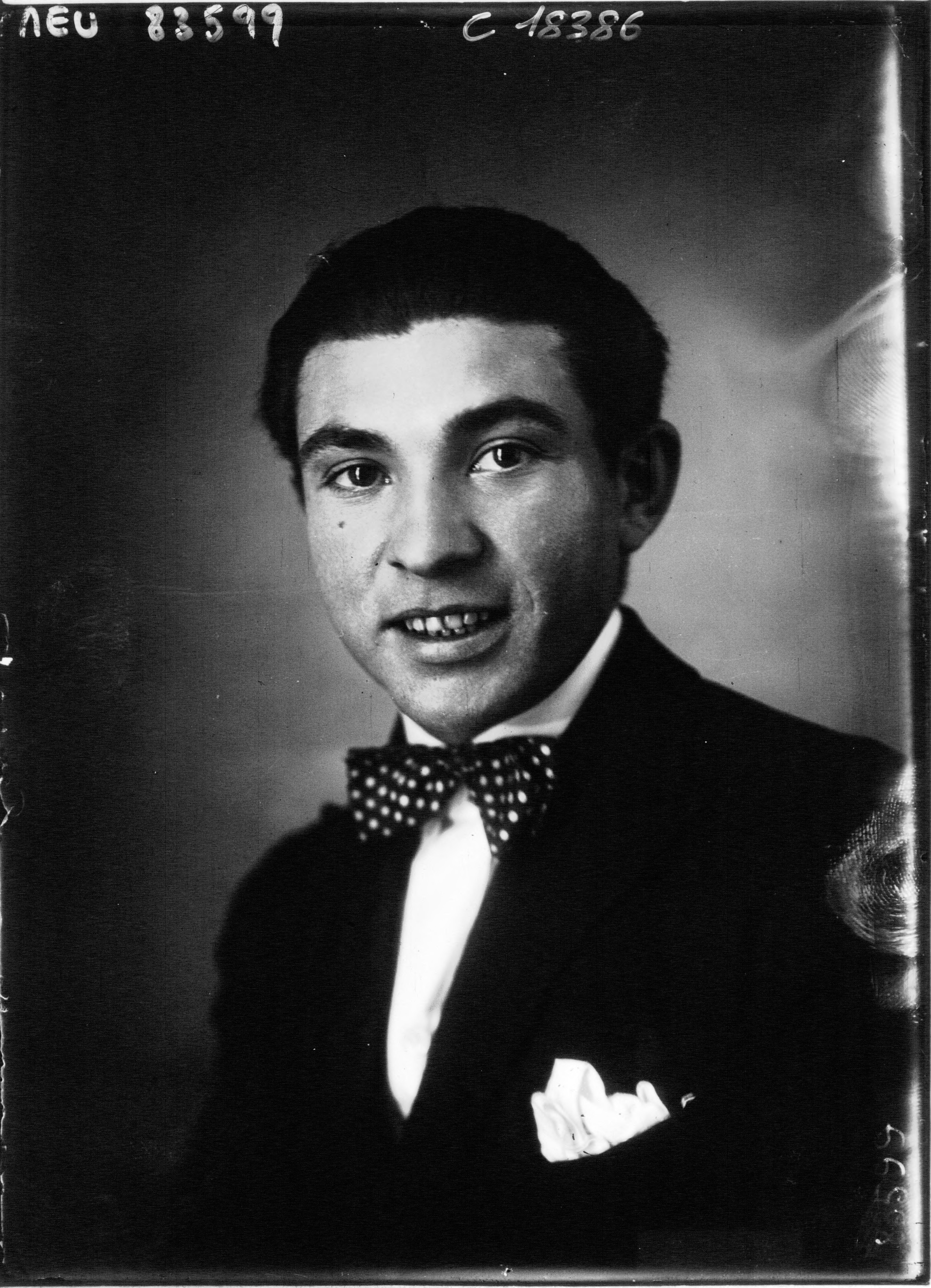
- Country (sports): France
- Born: 12 March 1901; Bidart, France
- Died: 29 March 1978 (aged 77); Paris, France

Singles
- Highest ranking: No. 1 (1932, Bill Tilden)
- Professional majors
- Wembley Pro: QF (1937)
- French Pro: W (1931); W (1932, World Pro)

Martin Plaa (12 March 1901 – 29 March 1978) was a professional tennis player from France who had success as a pro in the early 1930s.

Plaa worked for some years in the late 1920s (timing uncertain) as the then very successful French Davis Cup team coach. During the 1930s Plaa competed on the professional tour, amongst the world elite.

Among his achievements are the 1931 French Pro singles title, defeating countryman Robert Ramillon. Plaa also reached the finals in 1932 and 1934, but was defeated by Ramillon and Tilden respectively. In 1932 he won the singles title at the World professional championships in Berlin, where he defeated both Tilden and Hans Nüsslein. As a pro, Plaa was ranked as high as World No. 1 by his rival Bill Tilden in 1932 (Tilden placed himself second).
