= French Pro Championship =

French Pro Championships

Defunct tennis tournament
- Founded: 1930
- Abolished: 1968
- Location: Paris, France
- Venue: Stade Roland Garros (1930–39,1956–1962,1968); Palais des Sports (1950–1953); Stade Pierre de Coubertin (1963–67)
- Surface: Clay, Hard, Wood

The French Pro Championship was a major tennis tournament founded in 1930 by the "Association Française des Professeurs de Tennis (AFPT)" and ran annually until 1968 when it was discontinued.

== History ==
In 1930, the "Association Française des Professeurs de Tennis (AFPT)" held its first pro tournament, titled "Championnat International de France Professionnel" (French Pro Championships) June 18–22, 1930, and is considered as a part of the professional major from 1927 to 1967 till the advent of Open Era. The tournament only had a men's draw.

From 1930 the French Pro Championship were always played at Paris, on outdoor clay at Roland Garros except from 1963 to 1967 where it was held at Stade Pierre de Coubertin on indoor wood. Ken Rosewall holds the record for 8 wins overall and 7 consecutive wins.

There was a professional tournament at Roland Garros in 1952 held on a round robin basis, in which Segura finished first, winning the decider over Pancho Gonzales, Kramer third, and Budge fourth. There is no indication yet of recognition by the AFPT as the official French Pro.

There were tournaments played on indoor cement in 1950 and 1953 at the Palais des Sports. They are listed in the table below, but there is no suggestion that they were seen as official French Pro titles.

== Champions ==
=== Singles ===
Year	Champion	Runner-up	Score	Venue	Surface
Professional Era
1930	(Czechoslovakia) Karel Koželuh	(Republic of Ireland) Albert Burke	6–1, 6–2, 6–1	Roland Garros	Clay
1931	(France) Martin Plaa	(France) Robert Ramillon	6–3, 6–1, 3–6, 6–2	Roland Garros	Clay
1932	(France) Robert Ramillon	(France) Martin Plaa	6–4, 3–6, 8–6, 6–4	Roland Garros	Clay
1933 (Note: In History of the Pro Tennis Wars Ray Bowers gives a detailed account of the first twenty years of the professional tennis tours, from a modest beginning in 1926 with Suzanne Lenglen and Vincent Richards as the main attractions, on through 1945. No mention is made of a French Pro tournament in 1933. The only professional competition played that year at Roland Garros was a USA-France meeting, September 22–24, in the Davis Cup format won by the USA 4–1 where Cochet overcame Bruce Barnes, Tilden defeated Plaa and Cochet, Barnes beat Plaa, and Americans then closed out the doubles. Many sources, probably incorrectly, considered the Tilden-Cochet match as a final of a supposed French Pro.)	Not held				
1934	(United States) Bill Tilden	(France) Martin Plaa	6–2, 6–4, 7–5	Roland Garros	Clay
1935	(United States) Ellsworth Vines	(Germany) Hans Nüsslein	10–8, 6–4, 3–6, 6–1	Roland Garros	Clay
1936	(France) Henri Cochet	(France) Robert Ramillon	6–3, 6–1, 6–1	Roland Garros	Clay
1937	(Germany) Hans Nüsslein	(France) Henri Cochet	6–2, 8–6, 6–3	Roland Garros	Clay
1938	(Germany) Hans Nüsslein	(United States) Bill Tilden	6–0, 6–1, 6–2	Roland Garros	Clay
1939	(United States) Don Budge	(United States) Ellsworth Vines	6–2, 7–5, 6–3	Roland Garros	Clay
1940–1949	Not held				
1950 (Note: In 1953, from Saturday November 21 to Sunday November 22, a 4-man (Sedgman winner, Gonzales runner-up, Segura 3rd and Budge 4th) professional tournament was held in Paris on indoor red cement at the Palais des Sports but there is no mention that this tournament was a French Pro: in particular in the January 1954 edition of Tennis de France, the French magazine, run by Philippe Chatrier (future president of the ILTF) who made the report of this tournament by interviewing the winner Frank Sedgman. Joe McCauley included this tournament in his list of French Pro tournaments but in the precis to his book History of Professional Tennis mentions that it may not have been considered at the time as an official French Pro. In January 1950 at the same site Pancho Segura defeated Jack Kramer.)	(Ecuador) Pancho Segura*	(United States) Jack Kramer		Palais des Sports	Hard (i)
1951	Not held				
1952	(Ecuador) Pancho Segura*	(United States) Jack Kramer	6-3, 6-2	Roland Garros	Clay
1953	(Australia) Frank Sedgman*	(United States) Pancho Gonzales		Palais des Sports	Hard (i)
1954–1955	Not held				
1956	(United States) Tony Trabert	(United States) Pancho Gonzales	6–3, 4–6, 5–7, 8–6, 6–2	Roland Garros	Clay
1957	Not held				
1958	(Australia) Ken Rosewall	(Australia) Lew Hoad	3–6, 6–2, 6–4, 6–0	Roland Garros	Clay
1959	(United States) Tony Trabert	(Australia) Frank Sedgman	6–4, 6–4, 6–4	Roland Garros	Clay
1960	(Australia) Ken Rosewall	(Australia) Lew Hoad	6–2, 2–6, 6–2, 6–1	Roland Garros	Clay
1961	(Australia) Ken Rosewall	(United States) Pancho Gonzales	2–6, 6–4, 6–3, 8–6	Roland Garros	Clay
1962	(Australia) Ken Rosewall	(Spain) Andrés Gimeno	3–6, 6–2, 7–5, 6–2	Roland Garros	Clay
1963	(Australia) Ken Rosewall	(Australia) Rod Laver	6–8, 6–4, 5–7, 6–3, 6–4	Stade Pierre de Coubertin	Wood (i)
1964	(Australia) Ken Rosewall	(Australia) Rod Laver	6–3, 7–5, 3–6, 6–3	Stade Pierre de Coubertin	Wood (i)
1965	(Australia) Ken Rosewall	(Australia) Rod Laver	6–3, 6–2, 6–4	Stade Pierre de Coubertin	Wood (i)
1966	(Australia) Ken Rosewall	(Australia) Rod Laver	6–3, 6–2, 14–12	Stade Pierre de Coubertin	Wood (i)
1967	(Australia) Rod Laver	(Spain) Andrés Gimeno	6–4, 8–6, 4–6, 6–2	Stade Pierre de Coubertin	Wood (i)
Open Era
1968	(Australia) Rod Laver	(Australia) John Newcombe	6–2, 6–2, 6–3	Roland Garros	Clay

=== Doubles ===
Year	Champion	Runner-up	Score	Venue	Surface
Professional Era
1930	(Czechoslovakia) Karel Koželuh (Germany) Roman Najuch	(Republic of Ireland) Albert Burke (Republic of Ireland) Edmund Burke	6–4, 6–2, 3–6, 6–1	Roland Garros	Clay
1931				Roland Garros	Clay
1932				Roland Garros	Clay
1933	Not held				
1934				Roland Garros	Clay
1935	(United States) Bill Tilden (United States) Ellsworth Vines	(Republic of Ireland) Albert Burke (Germany) Hans Nüsslein	6–4, 3–6, 7–5, 6–4	Roland Garros	Clay
1936	(France) Henri Cochet (Republic of Ireland) Albert Burke	(France) Martin Plaa (France) Robert Ramillon	6–1, 4–6, 6–1, 6–3	Roland Garros	Clay
1937	(United States) Lester Stoefen (United States) Bill Tilden	(France) Henri Cochet (France) Robert Ramillon	6–4, 3–6, 6–2, 6–3	Roland Garros	Clay
1938	(France) Martin Plaa (France) Robert Ramillon	(Germany) Hans Nüsslein (United States) Bill Tilden	6–3, 4–6, 4–6, 6–3, 6–4	Roland Garros	Clay
1939	(United States) Don Budge (United States) Ellsworth Vines	(France) Henri Cochet (France) Robert Ramillon	6–4, 6–4, 2–6, 6–4	Roland Garros	Clay
1940–1949	Not held				
1950				Palais des Sports	Hard (i)
1951	Not held				
1952				Roland Garros	Clay
1953	(United States) Don Budge* (Australia) Frank Sedgman*	(United States) Pancho Gonzales (Ecuador) Pancho Segura	2–6, 9–7, 6–4	Palais des Sports	Hard (i)
1954–1955	Not held				
1956	(United States) Pancho Gonzales (United States) Tony Trabert	(Australia) Rex Hartwig (Australia) Frank Sedgman	6–3, 2–6, 6–1	Roland Garros	Clay
1957	Not held				
1958	(Australia) Lew Hoad (United States) Tony Trabert	(United States) Pancho Gonzales (Australia) Ken Rosewall	6–4, 2–6, 6–1	Roland Garros	Clay
1959	(Australia) Lew Hoad (United States) Tony Trabert	(Australia) Mervyn Rose (Australia) Frank Sedgman	14–12, 6–4, 6–2	Roland Garros	Clay
1960	(Australia) Lew Hoad (United States) Tony Trabert	(Australia) Ken Rosewall (Australia) Frank Sedgman	6–4, 6–0, 6–1	Roland Garros	Clay
1961	(Australia) Lew Hoad (Australia) Ken Rosewall	(United States) Pancho Gonzales (United States) Tony Trabert	6–1, 6–3, 8–10, 13–11	Roland Garros	Clay
1962	(Australia) Lew Hoad (Australia) Ken Rosewall	(Australia) Mal Anderson (Australia) Ashley Cooper	6–1, 6–3, 6–3	Roland Garros	Clay
1963	(Australia) Lew Hoad (Australia) Ken Rosewall	(Australia) Mal Anderson (Australia) Rod Laver	6–2, 7–5, 8–6	Stade Pierre de Coubertin	Wood (i)
1964	(Australia) Lew Hoad (Australia) Ken Rosewall	(Chile) Luis Ayala (Spain) Andrés Gimeno	6–8, 6–4, 6–4	Stade Pierre de Coubertin	Wood (i)
1965	(Australia) Mal Anderson (Australia) Ken Rosewall	(United States) Butch Buchholz (Australia) Rod Laver	10–8, 4–6, 8–6, 2–6, 10–8	Stade Pierre de Coubertin	Wood (i)
1966	(United States) Butch Buchholz (Australia) Rod Laver	(France) Pierre Barthès (Spain) Andrés Gimeno	6–3, 6–3, 6–4	Stade Pierre de Coubertin	Wood (i)
1967	(France) Pierre Barthès (Spain) Andrés Gimeno	(Australia) Rod Laver (Australia) Fred Stolle	6–3, 6–4	Stade Pierre de Coubertin	Wood (i)
Open Era
1968	(Australia) Roy Emerson (Australia) Rod Laver	(Australia) Ken Rosewall (Australia) Fred Stolle	1–6, 3–6, 11–9, 6–3, 6–2	Roland Garros	Clay

== Bristol Cup and other French professional events ==
Before 1930 some tournaments were sometimes labelled "Professional Championships of France": the Bristol Cup (held from 1920 to 1932), the most important pro tournament in the world in the 1920s, was sometimes referred as the French Pro as well as the World Pro tournament held at Deauville in 1925. Therefore, two different tournaments were both considered as French Pro Championships in 1925 (World Pro at Deauville and Bristol Cup at Cannes) and from 1930 to 1932 (Roland Garros and Bristol Cup at Beaulieu).

== Records ==
=== Men's singles ===
Source: French Pro Championships, (1930–68): The Tennisbase included

Most titles	(Australia) Ken Rosewall	8
Most finals	(Australia) Ken Rosewall	8
Most consecutive titles	(Australia) Ken Rosewall (1960 - 1966)	7
Most consecutive finals	(Australia) Ken Rosewall (1960 - 1966)	7
Most matches played	(Australia) Ken Rosewall	32
Most matches won	(Australia) Ken Rosewall	30
Most consecutive matches won	(Australia) Ken Rosewall	25
Most editions played	(Australia) Ken Rosewall	11
Best winning %	(Australia) Ken Rosewall	93.75%
Title won with the fewest games lost	(Czechoslovakia) Karel Koželuh	20 (1930)
Youngest champion	(United States) Don Budge	23y, 7m, 14d (1939)
Oldest champion	(United States) Bill Tilden	41y, 7m, 7d (1934)

Longest final
1963 (55 games)
(Australia) Ken Rosewall	6	6	5	6	6
(Australia) Rod Laver	8	4	7	3	4

Shortest final
1938 (21 games)
(Germany) Hans Nüsslein	6	6	6
(United States) Bill Tilden	0	1	2

== See also ==
- French Pro Championship draws – Professional Era (1930–1967)
- U.S. Pro Tennis Championships
- Wembley Championships
- Major professional tennis tournaments before the Open Era

== Bibliography ==
- McCauley, Joe (2000). The History of Professional Tennis. Windsor: The Short Run Book Company Limited.
