= Robert Haillet =

French tennis player

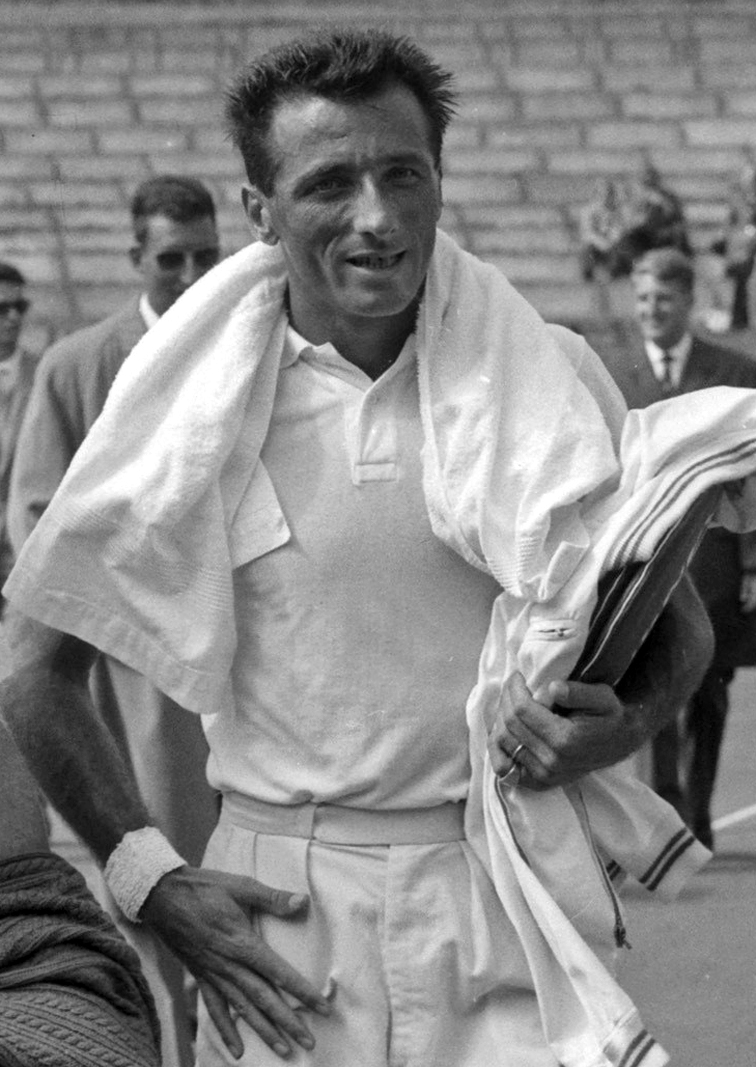
- Country (sports): France
- Born: 26 September 1931 Pau, France
- Died: 26 September 2011 (aged 80) Nice, France
- Plays: Right-handed

Singles
- Career record: 281-183
- Career titles: 31

Grand Slam singles results
- French Open: SF (1960)
- Wimbledon: 4R (1957)
- US Open: 2R (1958)
- Professional majors
- Wembley Pro: 1R (1960, 1961, 1962, 1963, 1964, 1965, 1966)
- French Pro: QF (1963, 1966)

Team competitions
- Davis Cup: F^{Eu} (1954)

Robert Haillet (26 September 1931 – 26 September 2011) was a French international tennis player. He competed in the Davis Cup a number of times, from 1952 to 1960.

The iconic tennis shoe adidas Stan Smith was initially named "adidas Robert Haillet" when introduced in 1965, but was changed in 1971 after Haillet's retirement from tennis.

Haillet won the Monte Carlo International Tennis Championships in 1958, defeating Jacques Brichant in the semifinal and Jaroslav Drobny in the final in three straight sets. Haillet defended his Monte Carlo title in 1959, defeating Brichant in the semifinal in four sets and Budge Patty in the final in four sets.

Haillet staged a remarkable comeback in his fourth round match against Budge Patty at the 1958 French Championships. Patty was leading 5–0, 40–0 in the fifth set but could not convert his match points and Haillet won seven consecutive games to win the final set 7–5. Haillet reached the semi-finals of the French championships in 1960 (beating Neale Fraser before losing to Nicola Pietrangeli).].

Haillet turned professional in mid 1960 when he joined the pro tour of Jack Kramer.

His son Jean-Louis Haillet was also a tennis player.
