= Robert Ramillon =

French tennis player

- Full name: Robert Henri Ramillon
- Country (sports): France
- Born: 24 February 1909; Cannes, France
- Died: 17 May 1964 (aged 55); Buenos Aires, Argentina

Singles
- Professional majors
- Wembley Pro: QF (1937)
- French Pro: W (1932)

Robert Ramillon was a French professional tennis player of the 1930s and was the winner of French Pro in 1932. He also played in the finals in 1931 and 1936.

== Early life and career ==
Ramillon was born on 24 February 1909 in Cannes, France. In 1928 he won the title at the Queen's Club Pro tournament. He was also runner-up at the Southport tournament in 1937 (beating Bill Tilden before losing to Hans Nüsslein). At the wartime Tournoi de France, held at Roland Garros, he was runner-up in 1941 to Bernard Destremau.

== See also ==
- Dan Maskell
