= Roman Najuch =

Polish professional tennis player (1893–1967)

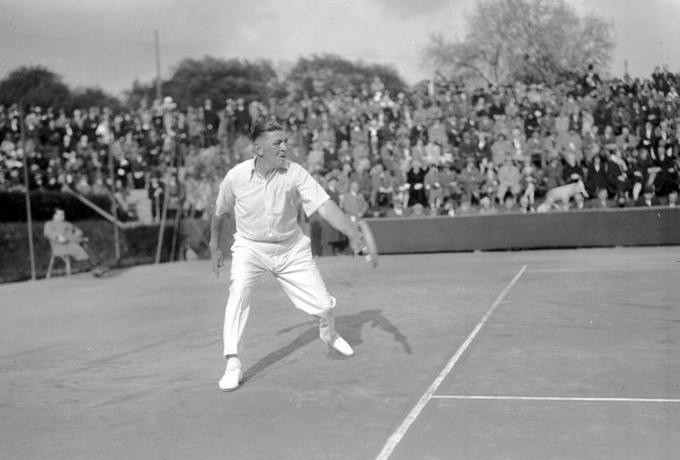
- Roman Najuch in 1928, in Grunewald
- Country (sports): German Reich (1919–1933)
- Born: 1893
- Died: 1967; Berlin
- Turned pro: 1911
- Retired: 1950
- Plays: Left-handed

Singles
- Career titles: 17
- Professional majors
- US Pro: QF (1930)
- French Pro: SF (1930) RR

Roman Najuch (15 February 1893 – 1967) was a professional tennis player and teacher based in Germany. He was a quarter finalist at the 1930 U.S. Pro Championships, and semi finalist at the French Pro Championship the same year. He was active from 1911 to 1950 and won 17 professional singles titles,

== Career ==
He was born in a location of today's Poland belonging to the Russian Empire at that time. His family moved to Germany, caused by revolutions and wars, and settled in Berlin. One of his first teachers was Georg Kerr who left Germany in 1910. Later he got German citizenship. He took part in the first German Pro Championships 1911, still with Russian citizenship, and reached the final, but the winner was Karel Koželuh. He won the German Championships in 1913 and 1914. He was teaching at the LTTC Rot-Weiss Tennis Club in Berlin. In October 1925 he became German Champion for the seventh time. In 1928 and 1929 he won German Pro Championships. He was defeated in 1931 by his student Hans Nüsslein after getting the title for eleven times. With Hans Nüsslein, who was 17 years younger, he played in the doubles event. Najuch was the coach of Poland's Davis Cup team and became president of the International Pro Tennis Federation. His life career was presented on German TV in the series Wie ich angefangen habe (1957–1958). Marshall Jon Fisher called him "one of the world's best players at the time" around the year 1925.
