= Karel Koželuh =

Czech sportsperson (1895–1950)

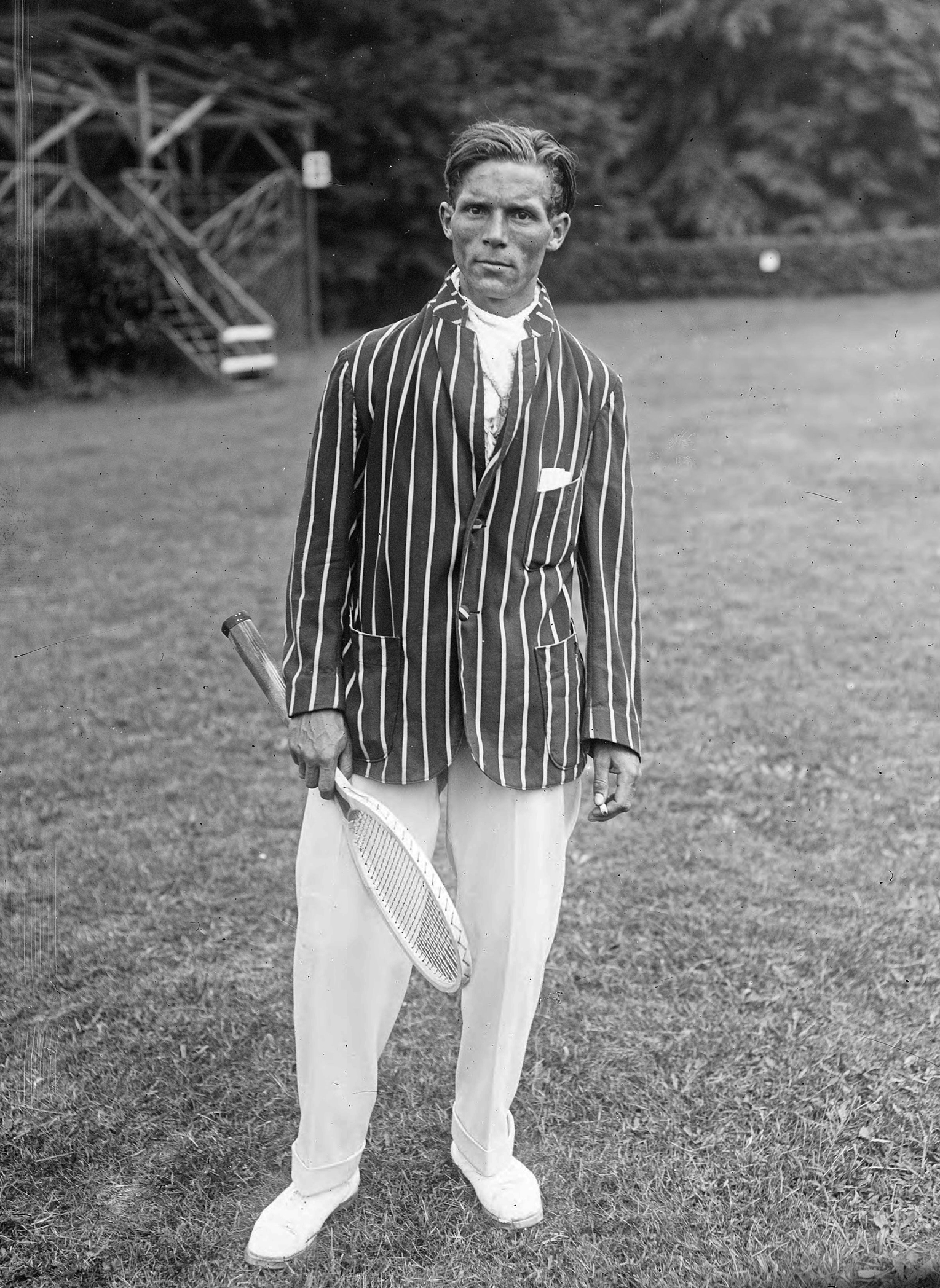
- Koželuh in 1919
- Country (sports): (Austria-Hungary) Austro-Hungarian Empire (before 1918); Czechoslovakia (after 1918)
- Born: 7 March 1895 Prague, Austria-Hungary
- Died: 27 April 1950 (aged 55) Prague, Czechoslovakia
- Height: 1.73 m (5 ft 8 in)
- Plays: Right-handed
- Int. Tennis HoF: 2006 (member page)

Singles
- Highest ranking: No. 1 (1927, Ray Bowers)
- Professional majors
- US Pro: W (1929, 1932, 1937)
- French Pro: W (1930)

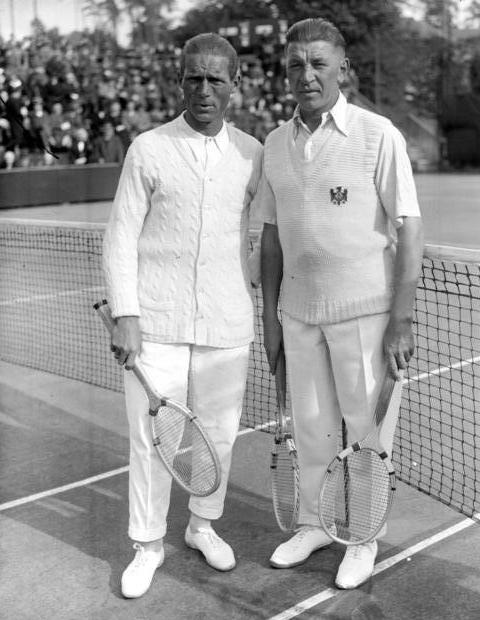
Karel Koželuh (left) with Roman Najuch

Karel Koželuh (Czech: [ˈkarɛl ˈkoʒɛlux]; Hungarian: Kozeluh Károly [ˈkozɛluh ˈkaːroj]; 7 March 1895 – 27 April 1950) was a Czech tennis, association football, and ice hockey player of the 1920s and 1930s. Koželuh became a European ice hockey champion in 1925 and was one of the top-ranked players on the professional tennis circuit in the 1930s.

== Rugby, football and ice hockey years ==
Koželuh was born in Prague, Bohemia, Austria-Hungary (today's Czech Republic), one of seven brothers and two sisters. His sports career began with rugby and it was only at the age of 16 that he learned to play tennis. In 1914 he joined the soccer team of Sparta Prague. In later years Koželuh also played for DFC Prag (Prague), Teplitzer FK (Teplice) and Wiener AC (Vienna).

He played international football for both Austria and Czechoslovakia.

In 1925, he was a member of the Czechoslovakia ice hockey team that won the European Championship, scoring the winning goal in the final game.

== Tennis ==
=== Early years ===
Koželuh became a professional tennis coach at a fairly young age and thereby made himself ineligible to play in any amateur tournaments. In 1912 he beat Roman Najuch in the Germany Pro Championships in Wiesbaden. He competed in the few professional tournaments that took place in Europe in the 1920s, contested primarily between teaching professionals. He became known in these tournaments for his speed, his endurance, and his fine groundstrokes from the baseline. Koželuh used the Continental grip, in which both the forehand and backhand are hit with the same grip, and preferred to play as much as ten feet behind the baseline, returning balls endlessly to the other court, almost never advancing to the net. Seldom hitting the ball very hard, he was content to outrun and outlast his opponents in exhausting matches of attrition. He won the most prestigious of these European tournaments, the Bristol Cup, played in Beaulieu, France, six times.

He was 5 feet 8 inches tall and weighed 145 pounds. The American tennis player Vinnie Richards said he was "seamy-faced, cadaverous-looking and, in general, resembled a cigar-store Indian."

=== Professional years ===
When a U.S. professional tour was started, Koželuh was one of the first players to join it, being signed up for it by Vinnie Richards, who made a special trip to Europe for that purpose. In 1928, his first year in the U.S. as a professional, he beat Richards 15 matches to 5. In the following years Koželuh continued to dominate Richards, in 1929 beating him 5 times to 2 and in 1930 4 times to 2. After watching one of their lengthy matches, a tennis expert of the time, J. Parmly Paret, wrote in American Lawn Tennis, that Koželuh had "the most perfect defense that I have seen... But defense alone does not make a champion." He went on to say that either Henri Cochet or Bill Tilden at their best would be able to defeat Koželuh by attacking him consistently from the net. Koželuh defended his somewhat tedious baseline style by saying, "Why should I change my style when it is so successful?"

Bill Tilden, the greatest player of the 1920s, turned professional at the end of 1930 and organized a tour with himself to play the headline match against Koželuh. Their first encounter was on 18 February 1931 before 14,000 spectators in Madison Square Garden in New York. Tilden won three straight sets in only 65 minutes, attacking from both the baseline and the net and overwhelming Koželuh with his power. Tilden won the next eight matches as well, all of them played indoors on a canvas surface that seldom had enough room for Koželuh to play his normal game far behind the baseline. Koželuh finally won their tenth match on an outdoor concrete court at the Los Angeles Tennis Club. In the course of the year, both in the United States and in Europe, the Czech eventually beat Tilden 17 times while losing 50 matches to him. Koželuh had firmly established himself as one of the half-dozen best players in the world.

Koželuh had already beaten Vinnie Richards to win the United States Pro Championship in 1929. He went on to win the title again in 1932, defeating the German Hans Nüsslein, and in 1937, beating the American Bruce Barnes at The Greenbrier in West Virginia at the age of 42. With this win, he became the oldest winner of a major professional singles tournament. In the first round at the Greenbrier tournament in 1938 (not classed as the US Pro that year), Koželuh faced Greenbrier golf professional Sam Snead, beating him in three straight sets. Koželuh was the losing finalist at the US Pro in 1928, 1930, 1934 and 1935. Koželuh was a six-time winner of the Bristol Cup in Menton, France, which was the most prestigious professional title in the world in the 1920s. He also won the World Pro tournament in Deauville, France, in 1925. Another major title for Koželuh was the French Professional Championship of 1930.

Karel Koželuh was the older brother of the tennis player Jan Koželuh. Jan was ranked as high as the world number 10 amateur in 1927. Karel was ranked joint world number 1 professional in 1927 by Ray Bowers (with Richards) and number 1 alone in 1928 by Bowers and in 1929 by Bowers, American Lawn Tennis, and Bill Tilden.

Koželuh was inducted into the International Tennis Hall of Fame in Newport, Rhode Island, in 2006.

== Death ==
Koželuh was killed in a car accident outside Prague on 27 April 1950.

== Major finals ==
=== Pro Slam tournaments ===
==== Singles: 8 (4 titles, 4 runners-up) ====
Result	Year	Championship	Surface	Opponent	Score
Loss	1928	U.S. Pro	Grass	(United States) Vincent Richards	6–8, 3–6, 6–0, 2–6
Win	1929	U.S. Pro	Grass	(United States) Vincent Richards	6–4, 6–4, 4–6, 4–6, 7–5
Win	1930	French Pro	Clay	(Republic of Ireland) Albert Burke	6–1, 6–2, 6–1
Loss	1930	U.S. Pro	Grass	(United States) Vincent Richards	2–6, 10–8, 6–3, 6–4
Win	1932	U.S. Pro	Clay	(Weimar Republic) Hans Nüsslein	6–2, 6–3, 7–5
Loss	1934	U.S. Pro	Clay	(Nazi Germany) Hans Nüsslein	4–6, 2–6, 6–1, 5–7
Loss	1935	U.S. Pro	Clay	(United States) William Tilden	6–0, 1–6, 4–6, 6–0, 4–6
Win	1937	U.S. Pro	Clay	(United States) Bruce Barnes	6–2, 6–3, 4–6, 4–6, 6–1

== Sources ==
- The History of Professional Tennis, Joe McCauley (2003)
