= Dan Maskell =

British tennis player and broadcaster

Dan Maskell CBE
- Full name: Daniel Maskell
- Country (sports): United Kingdom
- Born: 11 April 1908 Fulham, England
- Died: 10 December 1992 (aged 84)
- Turned pro: 1926
- Int. Tennis HoF: 1996 (member page)

Singles
- Career record: 126–37 (77.3%)
- Career titles: 20

Other tournaments
- Professional majors
- US Pro: QF (1930)
- Wembley Pro: QF (1935, 1937)

Daniel Maskell CBE (11 April 1908 – 10 December 1992) was an English tennis professional who later became a radio and television commentator on the sport. He was described as the BBC's "voice of tennis", and the "voice of Wimbledon".

== Early life ==
Maskell was born in Fulham, London, England. His father was an engineer, and Dan was the seventh of his eight children.

His family could not afford him to take up a place at Latymer Upper School, a grammar school in Hammersmith, so he was educated at Everington Street School instead. He captained the school football team, and was a ballboy at Queen's Club during the school holidays. Maskell soon decided to concentrate on tennis, and left school in 1923 to become a full-time ballboy at Queen's Club.

== Tennis career ==
Maskell became a junior teaching professional at Queen's in 1924, aged 16, and was given a five-year contract in 1926, teaching real tennis, rackets, and squash in addition to lawn tennis. The main tennis championships were then open only to amateurs. Maskell arranged the first World Professional Championships, played at Queen's Club in October 1927, which he won by defeating Charles Read. Maskell became British professional champion in 1928, and won the title another 15 times until 1951.

He was coach of the winning British Davis Cup team of 1933.

He served in the Royal Air Force in the Second World War. He became a rehabilitation officer in 1940, assisting wounded aircrew to recover their fitness in Torquay and then Loughborough. He was promoted to the rank of squadron leader, and appointed OBE in 1945 for his wartime service. After World War Two he continued playing tournaments he won the Slazenger Pro Championships, (1946–1947) and the Cheltenham Pro Championships in 1946.

After he was demobilised, he returned to the All England Club, and continued as a tennis professional. He coached members of the British royal family, including Princess Alexandra, Prince Charles, Princess Anne and Prince Andrew. He was chairman of the Professional Tennis Coaches Association, and became the first professional to be admitted as an honorary member of the All England Club in 1953. He retired as a tennis professional in 1955, but was then employed by the Lawn Tennis Association as its training manager until 1973. He was appointed CBE in the 1982 Birthday Honours for services to tennis.

== Commentating career ==
Maskell began commentating on the Wimbledon Championships in 1949 as an expert summariser for BBC Radio alongside Max Robertson, before switching to television in 1951 with Freddie Grisewood. He remained the BBC's main tennis commentator until his retirement in 1991. When commenting on a particularly exciting piece of play or an outstanding shot, he often said "Oh, I say!", which came to be regarded as his catchphrase.

He was also the BBC commentator when tennis resumed as an Olympic sport, first as a demonstration sport in Los Angeles in 1984, and then as a full-medal sport in Seoul in 1988.

The last Wimbledon match that he commentated on was the 1991 Men's Singles final in which Michael Stich defeated Boris Becker. The last tennis match he commentated on for BBC Television was the 1991 Grand Slam Cup final between David Wheaton and Michael Chang. At Wimbledon in 1992, Maskell was presented with a silver salver by the Duke of Kent. Maskell claimed to have attended every day of play at Wimbledon from 1929 onwards, and that he had first attended Wimbledon in 1924 when he saw the women's singles final.

== Private life ==
Maskell married his first wife, Constance Cox, in 1936. They had a daughter, Robin, and a son, Jay. Outside tennis, he enjoyed skiing and golf. His son, an accountant who qualified as a private pilot, was killed when his small aircraft crashed in The Bahamas in 1970. His wife drowned while swimming at Antigua in 1979. Maskell married his second wife, Kathleen Latto, in 1980. He published an autobiography, From Where I Sit, in 1988.

He suffered from prostate cancer in later life. On 10 December 1992, he died in his sleep, of heart failure, at East Surrey Hospital in Redhill, survived by his second wife and daughter.

He was posthumously inducted as a member of the International Tennis Hall of Fame in 1996.

The Dan Maskell Tennis Trust was founded in 1997 as a restricted fund of The Tennis Foundation, and became an independent charity in 2010. Its aims are to raise money to help disabled people to play tennis in three main areas: wheelchair tennis, deaf tennis and tennis for people with learning disabilities.
