= U.S. Pro Tennis Championships draws, 1927–1945 =

The U.S. Pro Tennis Championships were played each year from 1927 to 1999 (except 1944). Up to 1967, before the start of the "Open Era", this tournament was regarded as part of the professional grand slam. In 1963 the tournament failed financially but was revived in Boston without a break. It was originally called the National Professional Tennis Championships.

== 1927 ==
September 23–25, Notlek Tennis Club, Manhattan, New York – Clay

First round
Howard Kinsey	6	6
James P. Reid	0	3
Warren Kruger	6	6
John Cardegna	1	3
Paul Heston	6	6
William Ganley	0	1
Edwin Faulkner	6	6
Arthur Rudolph	2	4
Charles Wood	6	6
Otto Glocker	1	4
George Agutter	6	6
H. W. Hagemann	2	2
Vincent Richards	6	6
Julius Boise	0	0
John Collom	6	6
Louis Volpe	2	3

Quarterfinals
Howard Kinsey	6	6
Warren Kruger	1	1
Paul Heston	7	6
Edwin Faulkner	5	4
Charles Wood	6	6
George Agutter	2	4
Vincent Richards	6	6
John Collom	1	2

Semifinals
Howard Kinsey	6	6	6
Paul Heston	0	4	3
Charles Wood	0	1	2
Vincent Richards	6	6	6

Final
Howard Kinsey	9	4	3
Vincent Richards	11	6	6

== 1928 ==
West Side Tennis Club, New York – Grass

Second round
Howard Kinsey	6	6	6
Edwin Faulkner	4	0	3
Charles Wood	7	7	7
John Cardegna	5	5	5
J. Basil Maguire	6	6	6
James Kenney	4	4	2
Vincent Richards	6	6	6
Allen Behr	1	4	3
Karel Koželuh	6	6	6
A. Geidel	0	1	0
Warren Kruger	6	1	6	6
George Agutter	1	6	4	4
Paul Heston	6	6	6
Louis Volpe	3	4	1
Harvey Snodgrass	6	7	6
Arthur Rudolph	3	5	1

Quarterfinals
Howard Kinsey	6	8	8
Charles Wood	4	6	6
J. Basil Maguire	0	1	0
Vincent Richards	6	6	6
Karel Koželuh	6	6	6
Warren Kruger	0	1	0
Paul Heston	1	2	2
Harvey Snodgrass	6	6	6

Semifinals
Howard Kinsey	6	3	7	2	8
Vincent Richards	2	6	5	6	10
Karel Koželuh	8	6	6
Harvey Snodgrass	6	2	1

Final
Vincent Richards	8	6	0	6
Karel Koželuh	6	3	6	2

== 1929 ==
West Side Tennis Club, New York – Grass

Round of 16
Vincent Richards	6	6	6
J. Farrell	1	1	1
Wallace F. Johnson	6	6	6
George Agutter	2	2	3
Paul Heston	4	6	6	6
John Collom	6	2	1	4
John Cardegna	4	6	6	5	6
J. Basil Maguire	6	2	1	7	2
Karel Koželuh	6	6	6
Phil Bagby	1	2	2
Charles Wood	6	6	6
Henry Geidel	3	2	1
Howard Kinsey	6	6	6
Walter S. Gray	1	2	2
Edwin Faulkner	7	6	4	2	6
Warren Kruger	5	4	6	6	3

Quarterfinals
Vincent Richards	6	6	6
Wallace F. Johnson	3	1	2
Paul Heston	6	6	6
John Cardegna	3	4	2
Karel Koželuh	6	6	7
Charles Wood	0	2	5
Howard Kinsey	6	6	6
Edwin Faulkner	4	2	1

Semifinals
Vincent Richards	6	6	6
Paul Heston	1	3	4
Karel Koželuh	6	6	7
Howard Kinsey	4	4	5

Final
Vincent Richards	4	4	6	6	5
Karel Koželuh	6	6	4	4	7

== 1930 ==
West Side Tennis Club, New York – Grass

Third round
Karel Koželuh	6	6	6
Hamlin McGrath	0	0	0
Paul Heston	7	6	6
James Kenney	5	2	2
Howard Kinsey	6	6	6
Peter Peterson	0	3	2
Dan Maskell	6	6	6	10
Edwin Faulkner	2	1	8	8
Vincent Richards	6	6	6
James Burns, Sr.	0	3	4
Norval Craig	6	6	6
Wallace F. Johnson	3	3	4
Harvey Snodgrass	7	5	6	6
Hans Hummel	5	7	0	1
Roman Najuch	6	6	9
Charles Wood	4	4	7

Quarterfinals
Karel Koželuh	6	6	6
Paul Heston	3	2	4
Howard Kinsey	3	5	6	7	6
Dan Maskell	6	7	2	5	1
Vincent Richards	6	6	6
Norval Craig	1	4	3
Harvey Snodgrass	4	6	6	6
Roman Najuch	6	0	4	3

Semifinals
Karel Koželuh	6	6	6
Howard Kinsey	0	2	3
Vincent Richards	6	6	6
Harvey Snodgrass	1	3	2

Final
Karel Koželuh	6	8	3	4
Vincent Richards	2	10	6	6

== 1931 ==
West Side Tennis Club, New York – Grass

Third round
Bill Tilden	6	6	6
Jimmie Mitchell	0	1	0
Emmett Paré	6	6	6
J. Basil Maguire	1	3	4
Howard Kinsey	6	6	8
Charles Wood	0	4	6
Albert Burke	6	6	6
John Cardegna	2	1	0
Vincent Richards	6	6	6
Paul Heston	3	0	4
Robert Seller	6	6	3	6
Henry Geidel	3	3	6	0
Frank Hunter	6	6	6
James Burns, Jr.	0	0	0
Karel Koželuh	6	6	6
Rudolph Noble	0	2	0

Quarterfinals
Bill Tilden	7	7	6
Emmett Paré	5	5	4
Howard Kinsey	10	8	6	6
Albert Burke	8	10	4	4
Vincent Richards	6	6	6
Robert Seller	3	4	4
Frank Hunter	6	3	2	2
Karel Koželuh	3	6	6	6

Semifinals
Bill Tilden	6	6	6
Howard Kinsey	4	0	3
Vincent Richards	6	6	6
Karel Koželuh	2	4	3

Final
Bill Tilden	7	6	6
Vincent Richards	5	2	1

== 1932 ==
South Shore Country Club, Chicago – Clay

Round of 16
Bill Tilden	6	6	6
Phil Bagby	3	2	2
Albert Burke	6	6	6
Charles Wood	2	4	0
Emmett Paré	6	6	6
Arthur Rudolph	2	2	1
Karel Koželuh	w/o
Robert Seller
Vincent Richards	6	6	6
Warren Kruger	1	2	0
Roman Najuch	6	6	6
Edwin Faulkner	1	1	3
Bruce Barnes	6	6	6
Paul Heston	1	3	1
Hans Nüsslein	6	6	6
John Cardegna	1	4	2

Quarterfinals
Bill Tilden	6	6	9
Albert Burke	0	4	7
Emmett Paré	2	6	6	3
Karel Koželuh	6	8	3	6
Vincent Richards	5	1	6	3
Roman Najuch	7	6	2	6
Bruce Barnes	3	4	3
Hans Nüsslein	6	6	6

Semifinals
Bill Tilden	3	6	5	1
Karel Koželuh	6	3	7	6
Roman Najuch	2	10	1
Hans Nüsslein	6	12	6

Final
Karel Koželuh	6	6	7
Hans Nüsslein	2	2	5

== 1933 ==
Round of 16
Vincent Richards	6	6	6
Edwin Faulkner	1	2	0
Theodore Rericha	6	6	6
C. Kenyon	1	0	2
Robert Murray	6	6	6
Dan Martella	0	2	3
J. Basil Maguire	7	6	4	6	6
Thomas Iannicelli	9	2	6	3	2
Frank Hunter	1	6	6	1	6
Herman Peterson	6	2	3	6	2
Charles Wood	5	1	7	9	6
John Cardegna	7	6	5	7	4
Paul Heston	6	6	6
W. Tyler	1	2	4
William Triest
Julius Boise	w/o

Quarterfinals
Vincent Richards	6	6	6
Theodore Rericha	2	4	3
Robert Murray	2	10	6	6
J. Basil Maguire	6	8	4	0
Frank Hunter	6	6	2	6
Charles Wood	2	2	6	2
Paul Heston	6	6	6
William Triest	1	0	1

Semifinals
Vincent Richards	6	6	6
Robert Murray	1	1	4
Frank Hunter	1	6	6	7
Paul Heston	6	1	2	5

Final
Vincent Richards	6	6	6
Frank Hunter	3	0	2

== 1934 ==
Round of 16
Vincent Richards	6	6	6
Ellis Klingeman	2	2	0
Paul Heston	8	6	7
J. Castle	6	1	5
Bruce Barnes	6	6	6
F. Kukn	3	0	4
Karel Koželuh	6	6	6
Thomas Frydell	0	1	0
Ellsworth Vines	6	3	6	6
George O'Connell	3	6	1	3
Charles Wood	6	7	7
A. K. Wylie	2	5	5
Emmett Paré	6	6	4	6
Alfred Chapin	1	2	6	4
Hans Nüsslein	6	6	6
George Jennings	1	2	4

Quarterfinals
Vincent Richards	6	6	6
Paul Heston	3	2	2
Bruce Barnes	2	4	3
Karel Koželuh	6	6	6
Ellsworth Vines	6	6	6
Charles Wood	3	2	3
Emmett Paré	6	6	3	3	1
Hans Nüsslein	0	2	6	6	6

Semifinals
Vincent Richards	2	6	0
Karel Koželuh	6	8	6
Ellsworth Vines	9	1	3	2
Hans Nüsslein	7	6	6	6

Final
Karel Koželuh	4	2	6	5
Hans Nüsslein	6	6	1	7

== 1935 ==
Round of 16
Karel Koželuh	6	6	6
Rudolph Noble	1	0	1
Herman Peterson	6	7	6
George Jennings	2	5	2
Lester Stoefen	6	6	6
James Pressly Sr.	2	0	3
Frank Hunter	9	6	7	6	7
Peter Peterson	11	2	9	4	5
Bill Tilden	6	6	6
Harold Blauer	3	3	3
Charles Wood	3	8	6	2	6
Walter Wesbrook	6	6	2	6	2
George Lott	6	7	4	6
Thomas Iannicelli	4	5	6	0
Alfred Chapin	6	8	6
Joe Whalen	1	6	1

Quarterfinals
Karel Koželuh	6	6	6
Herman Peterson	4	1	2
Lester Stoefen	7	6	6
Frank Hunter	5	4	1
Bill Tilden	7	6	6
Charles Wood	5	2	3
George Lott	6	6	7
Alfred Chapin	2	4	5

Semifinals
Karel Koželuh	6	6	6
Lester Stoefen	4	3	0
Bill Tilden	6	5	6	6
George Lott	1	7	3	4

Final
Karel Koželuh	6	1	4	6	4
Bill Tilden	0	6	6	0	6

== 1936 ==
Round of 16
Joe Whalen	6	7
Teddy Rericha	2	5
Harold Blauer	6	6
R. McLeod	2	1
Edwin Faulkner	4	6	6
William Einsman	6	4	3
Ellis Klingeman	6	8
Thomas Iannicelli	4	6
Charles Wood	6	6
Herbert Stead	2	4
Ed Burns	7	6
Henry Geidel	5	4
Dan Watson	6
William Ellis	2	rtd.
James Mitchell	6	6
Selwyn Orcutt	2	3

Quarterfinals
Joe Whalen	6	8
Harold Blauer	4	6
Edwin Faulkner	6	6
Ellis Klingeman	2	4
Charles Wood	6	6
Ed Burns	2	1
Dan Watson	7	6
James Mitchell	5	2

Semifinals
Joe Whalen	6	6	6
Edwin Faulkner	2	4	4
Charles Wood	6	6	6
Dan Watson	2	2	3

Final
Joe Whalen	4	4	6	6	6
Charles Wood	6	6	3	2	3

== 1937 ==
Quarterfinals
Karel Koželuh	6	6	6
Herman Peterson	4	2	1
Joe Whalen	6	6	6
Alfred Chapin	1	2	3
George Lott	3	6	2	6	6
Ben Gorchakoff	6	1	6	1	2
Bruce Barnes	3	6	6	6
Vincent Richards	6	3	4	3

Semifinals
Karel Koželuh	6	6	6
Joe Whalen	1	4	0
George Lott	0	2	5
Bruce Barnes	6	6	7

Final
Karel Koželuh	6	6	4	4	6
Bruce Barnes	2	3	6	6	1

== 1938 ==
Second round
Fred Perry	6	6	6
Phil Greenstein	1	1	4
John Faunce	7	6	6
Lloyd Budge	5	2	4
Berkeley Bell	3	6	1	7	6
Herman Peterson	6	4	6	5	2
George Lott	6	6	6
Wilmer Hines	1	2	3
Bruce Barnes	6	6	6
Edward Stillman	0	2	2
Joe Whalen	4	6	6	7
Arthur Hendrix	6	4	4	5
Walter Senior	6	6	6
George Jennings	0	1	4
Dick Skeen	7	8	6	8
Vincent Richards	9	6	1	6

Quarterfinals
Fred Perry	6	6	6
John Faunce	4	0	2
Berkeley Bell	6	8	3	6
George Lott	3	6	6	4
Bruce Barnes	6	6	2	6
Joe Whalen	2	3	6	3
Walter Senior	1	4	4
Dick Skeen	6	6	6

Semifinals
Fred Perry	6	7	6
Berkeley Bell	2	5	3
Bruce Barnes	3	6	9	6
Dick Skeen	6	4	7	4

Final
Fred Perry	6	6	6
Bruce Barnes	3	2	4

== 1939 ==
Second round
Fred Perry	6	6	2	6
W. H. Doeg	1	2	6	3
Keith Gledhill	6	6	6
Vincent Richards	0	3	2
Bill Tilden	6	6	4	6
William Weissbuch	2	2	6	2
John Faunce	7	6	6
Bruce Barnes	5	4	3
Ellsworth Vines	6	6	6
Kenneth Napier	4	3	4
Ben Gorchakoff	4	6	6	10
Walter Senior	6	1	1	8
Lester Stoefen	6	6	6
Bernard Coghlan	1	4	4
Dick Skeen	6	6	6
Mort Ballagh	2	4	4

Quarterfinals
Fred Perry	7	7	5	6
Keith Gledhill	5	5	7	2
Bill Tilden	7	8	6
John Faunce	5	6	4
Ellsworth Vines	6	6	6
Ben Gorchakoff	1	3	0
Lester Stoefen	6	3	5
Dick Skeen	8	6	7

Semifinals
Fred Perry	6	6	5	6
Bill Tilden	3	1	7	2
Ellsworth Vines	w/o
Dick Skeen

Final
Fred Perry	6	8	1	18
Ellsworth Vines	8	6	6	20

== 1940 ==
Second round
Don Budge	6	6	6
George Jennings	3	3	0
Walter Senior	6	6	6
E. Bax	1	1	1
Bill Tilden	6	6	6
P. Martin	4	1	3
Joe Whalen	4	6	6	2	6
George O'Connell	6	1	2	6	2
John Nogrady	8	6	6	6
Vincent Richards	10	0	1	0
Karel Koželuh	6	6	6
J. L. Lamb	0	2	3
Arthur Hendrix	9	6	6	6
Kenneth Napier	11	4	4	4
Fred Perry	6	6	6
Edward Stillman	2	1	4

Quarterfinals
Don Budge	6	6	6
Walter Senior	1	3	1
Bill Tilden	6	6	7
Joe Whalen	4	1	5
John Nogrady	6	6
Karel Koželuh	4	0	rtd.
Arthur Hendrix	1	4	2
Fred Perry	6	6	6

Semifinals
Don Budge	6	6	6
Bill Tilden	4	2	4
John Nogrady	4	3	6	4
Fred Perry	6	6	4	6

Final
Don Budge	6	5	6	6
Fred Perry	3	7	4	3

== 1941 ==
Second round
John Faunce	6	6	6
Don Budge	4	1	3
Karel Koželuh	3	6	7	6
Vincent Richards	6	4	5	1
Dick Skeen	6	6	6
Dan Watson	4	2	2
Joe Whalen	9	2	6	7	7
Lester Stoefen	7	6	4	9	5
Fred Perry	6	7	7
Charles Wood	4	5	5
John Nogrady	6	6	6
A. K. Wylie	1	2	1
Bill Tilden	6	6	6
George O'Connell	1	3	0
Keith Gledhill	6	4	6	6
Berkeley Bell	4	6	0	4

Quarterfinals
John Faunce	1	2	7	6	6
Karel Koželuh	6	6	5	3	2
Dick Skeen	6	6	6
Joe Whalen	2	4	4
Fred Perry	6	9	6
John Nogrady	4	7	1
Bill Tilden	2	3	3
Keith Gledhill	6	6	6

Semifinals
John Faunce	3	6	6	3
Dick Skeen	6	8	2	6
Fred Perry	6	6	6	7
Keith Gledhill	1	8	4	5

Final
Dick Skeen	4	8	2	3
Fred Perry	6	6	6	6

== 1942 ==
Second round
Don Budge	6
Karel Koželuh	2	rtd.
John Nogrady	6	6	6
Charles Wood	1	1	2
Wayne Sabin	6	6	6
Herman Peterson	0	1	0
Bruce Barnes	w/o
Dan Watson
Bobby Riggs	6	6	6
Frank Hunter	2	2	2
Robert Harman	9	6	6
Alfred Chapin	7	1	1
Frank Kovacs	6	6	8
William Kenney	1	2	6
Frank Rericha	6	6	6
Frank Kenney	3	1	4

Quarterfinals
Don Budge	6	2	6	6
John Nogrady	1	6	4	1
Wayne Sabin	7	5	6	6
Bruce Barnes	5	7	1	4
Bobby Riggs	6	3	6	4	6
Robert Harman	3	6	1	6	1
Frank Kovacs	6	3	6	9
Frank Rericha	2	6	0	7

Semifinals
Don Budge	6	7	6
Wayne Sabin	2	5	3
Bobby Riggs	6	3	8	6
Frank Kovacs	4	6	6	2

Final
Don Budge	6	6	6
Bobby Riggs	2	2	2

== 1943 ==
Second round
Bruce Barnes	6	6	6
Ray White	1	0	2
Gene Mako	6	6	6
Frank Rericha	3	1	3
Berkeley Bell	6	6	6
Harold Duncan	3	0	0
Karel Koželuh	6	6	6
Edward Stillman	1	0	0
John Nogrady	6	6	6
Ed Copeland	2	0	3
Lloyd Budge	6	6	6
Vincent Richards	2	3	0
Welby Van Horn	6	6	5	6
Frank Goeltz	3	3	7	3
Bill Tilden	6	6	6
Charles Wood	2	2	3

Quarterfinals
Bruce Barnes	6	6	8
Gene Mako	0	4	6
Berkeley Bell	6	0	3	6
Karel Koželuh	3	6	6	8
John Nogrady	6	6	6
Lloyd Budge	3	1	3
Welby Van Horn	4	6	6	10
Bill Tilden	6	1	4	8

Semifinals
Bruce Barnes	6	6	6
Karel Koželuh	0	2	3
John Nogrady	6	6	13	6
Welby Van Horn	3	4	15	3

Final
Bruce Barnes	6	7	7	4	6
John Nogrady	1	9	5	6	3

== 1945 ==
Round of 16
Welby Van Horn	6	6
Sam Shore	1	1
Robert Decker	4	6	6
Frank Rericha	6	2	4
Bill Tilden	7	6
Frank Goeltz	5	1
Karel Koželuh	6	7
Herman Peterson	2	5
Dick Skeen	6	6
A. Hopper	0	2
Vincent Richards	6	6
E. Epstein	3	0
John Nogrady	6	6
Jack March	1	1
Walter Senior	6	6
George Rogers	2	2

Quarterfinals
Welby Van Horn	6	6	8
Robert Decker	2	3	6
Bill Tilden	6	6	3	3	6
Karel Koželuh	3	0	6	6	4
Dick Skeen	6	6	6
Vincent Richards	1	4	3
John Nogrady	7	4	6	4	6
Walter Senior	5	6	3	6	3

Semifinals
Welby Van Horn	6	6	6
Bill Tilden	0	2	1
Dick Skeen	3	3	1
John Nogrady	6	6	6

Final
Welby Van Horn	6	6	6
John Nogrady	4	2	2

== See also ==
- U.S. Pro Tennis Championships draws, 1946–1967
- French Pro Championship draws
- Wembley Professional Championships draws
