= Major professional tennis tournaments before the Open Era =

Before the advent of the Open Era of tennis competitions in April 1968, only amateurs were allowed to compete in established tournaments, including the four majors. There was no prize money and players were compensated for travel expenses only. However, many top tennis players turned professional to play legally for prize money in the years before the open era. They played in separate professional events, mostly on tours involving head-to-head competition, but also in professional tournaments as the biggest events on the pro tour. Professional tournaments, in particular the professional majors, usually only had a men's draw.

== Professional majors ==
In addition to the head-to-head tours, there were also major pro events, where the world's top professional male players often played. These tournaments held with a certain tradition and longevity. According to Ellsworth Vines, "the Wembley tournament in London..., the U.S. professional championship, and to some extent the tournament in Paris were the major professional tournaments prior to 1968."

The oldest of these three tournaments was the U.S. Pro Tennis Championships, played at a variety of different venues and on a variety of different surfaces, between 1927 and 1999. The Wembley Championship, played between 1934 and 1990 at the Wembley Arena in the United Kingdom, was played on a wood surface through 1967. The third professional major was the French Pro Championship, where between 1930 and 1968 it was played on both clay and wood courts. A player who won all three in a calendar year was considered in retrospect by later tennis writers to achieve a "Professional Grand Slam", or "Pro Slam".

In some years, professional tournaments other than the pro majors had stronger fields and offered more prize money. Jack Kramer designated the four major professional tournaments for the 1958/1959 seasons as follows; Forest Hills, Kooyong, L.A. Masters, Sydney.

=== U.S. Pro Tennis Championships ===
The U.S. Pro Tennis Championship, also known as the US Pro, and officially known as the Cleveland International Pro or Cleveland World Pro Tennis Championships between 1951 and 1962, was an annual tournament, later known as MFS Pro Championships. It was first organized by player Vincent Richards when promoter C. C. Pyle withdrew interest in the project. It was first played on the Notlek courts located at 119th Street and Riverside Drive, Manhattan. The tournament was held at various locations in several states until 1964, when it moved to the Longwood Cricket Club in Chestnut Hill, Massachusetts. In both 1951 and 1954 there are two U.S. Pro tournaments listed here for each year.

=== French Pro Championship ===
The French Pro Championship was first held in 1930, held by the "Association Française des Professeurs de Tennis (AFPT)", entitled "Championnat International de France Professionnel" (French Pro Championships) on June 18–22, 1930. From 1930 the French Pro Championship was always played at Paris, on outdoor clay at Roland Garros except from 1963 to 1967 where it was held at Stade Pierre de Coubertin on indoor wood.

=== Wembley Championship ===
The Wembley Championship, also known as the Wembley Pro, was held at the Wembley Arena, in London. This professional event ran from 1934 to 1967 and was originally played on a wood surface placed over the top of a drained pool. It was officially known as the "London Indoor Professional Championships" from 1951 through 1967.

=== List of professional major champions ===
==== Singles ====
Year	U.S. Pro	French Pro	Wembley Pro
1927	(United States) Vincent Richards (1/4)	no competition	no competition
1928	(United States) Vincent Richards (2/4)	no competition	no competition
1929	(Czechoslovakia) Karel Koželuh (1/4)	no competition	no competition
1930	(United States) Vincent Richards (3/4)	(Czechoslovakia) Karel Koželuh (2/4)	no competition
1931	(United States) Bill Tilden (1/3)	(France) Martin Plaa (1/1)	no competition
1932	(Czechoslovakia) Karel Koželuh (3/4)	(France) Robert Ramillon (1/1)	no competition
1933	(United States) Vincent Richards (4/4)	no competition	no competition
1934	(Germany) Hans Nüsslein (1/4)	(United States) Bill Tilden (2/3)	(United States) Ellsworth Vines (1/4)
1935	(United States) Bill Tilden (3/3)	(United States) Ellsworth Vines (2/4)	(United States) Ellsworth Vines (3/4)
1936	(United States) Joe Whalen (1/1)	(France) Henri Cochet (1/1)	no competition (Note: The Wembley Championships of 1936 and 1938 did not take place. The London Daily Mail of August 24th 1936 contained an article stating that the 1936 Wembley event would not take place due to Tilden and Vines being unavailable. Ray Bowers, in his History of professional tennis, says that 1936 and 1938 Wembley tournaments never occurred and offers substantiating evidence for his assertion.)
1937	(Czechoslovakia) Karel Koželuh (4/4) (Note: The 1937 US Pro was the first pro event open to amateur players and is considered as both the U.S. Pro Tennis Championship and first "true" U.S. Open event.)	(Germany) Hans Nüsslein (2/4)	(Germany) Hans Nüsslein (3/4)
1938	(United Kingdom) Fred Perry (1/2)	(Germany) Hans Nüsslein (4/4)	no competition
1939	(United States) Ellsworth Vines (4/4)	(United States) Don Budge (2/4)	(United States) Don Budge (1/4)
1940	(United States) Don Budge (3/4)	no competition	no competition
1941	(United Kingdom) Fred Perry (2/2)	no competition	no competition
1942	(United States) Don Budge (4/4)	no competition	no competition
1943	(United States) Bruce Barnes (1/1)	no competition	no competition
1944	no competition	no competition	no competition
1945	(United States) Welby Van Horn (1/1)	no competition	no competition
1946	(United States) Bobby Riggs (1/3)	no competition	no competition
1947	(United States) Bobby Riggs (2/3)	no competition	no competition
1948	(United States) Jack Kramer (1/2)	no competition	no competition
1949	(United States) Bobby Riggs (3/3)	no competition	(United States) Jack Kramer (2/2)
1950	(Ecuador) Pancho Segura (1/3)	no competition (Note: There were 4 man tournaments held in Paris in 1950, 1952 and 1953. The 1950 and 1953 tournaments were held indoors, whilst the 1952 tournament was held on clay at Roland Garros.)	(United States) Pancho Gonzales (1/13)
1951 (Note: The championship events from 1951–1962, were billed as the International Pro or World Pro Championship. In 1951, a U.S. Pro was held at Forest Hills authorized by the USPLTA, and an International Pro was held at Cleveland. There was no USPLTA U.S. Pro event held in 1952 or 1953, but the International Pro was held at Cleveland in those years and was regarded as the U.S. Pro. In 1954, the USPLTA authorized Kramer to hold the U.S. Pro at L.A. Tennis Club in Los Angeles (this was the successor tournament to the 1951 U.S. Pro at Forest Hills and Segura was the defending champion). The International Pro and World Pro events at Cleveland from 1951–62 were not authorized by the USPLTA to be the U.S. Pro, and were not billed as such. The USPLTA were an organisation of teaching professionals and the touring professionals did enter U.S. Pro events in this period. In some interviews in the 1950s, Gonzales and Segura referred to the Cleveland World Pro as "the National" or the "U.S. National Professional Championships". There were many newspaper and magazine articles in the 1950s that also referred to Cleveland events as U.S. Pro.)	(United States) Frank Kovacs (1/1) (Cleveland) (Ecuador) Pancho Segura (2/3) (Forest Hills)	no competition	(United States) Pancho Gonzales (2/13)
1952	(Ecuador) Pancho Segura (3/3)	no competition	(United States) Pancho Gonzales (3/13)
1953	(United States) Pancho Gonzales (4/13)	no competition	(Australia) Frank Sedgman (1/2)
1954	(United States) Pancho Gonzales (5/13) (Cleveland) (United States) Pancho Gonzales (6/13) (Los Angeles)	no competition	no competition
1955	(United States) Pancho Gonzales (7/13)	no competition	no competition
1956	(United States) Pancho Gonzales (8/13)	(United States) Tony Trabert (1/2)	(United States) Pancho Gonzales (9/13)
1957	(United States) Pancho Gonzales (10/13)	no competition	(Australia) Ken Rosewall (1/15)
1958	(United States) Pancho Gonzales (11/13)	(Australia) Ken Rosewall (2/15)	(Australia) Frank Sedgman (2/2)
1959	(United States) Pancho Gonzales (12/13)	(United States) Tony Trabert (2/2)	(Australia) Mal Anderson (1/1)
1960	(United States) Alex Olmedo (1/1)	(Australia) Ken Rosewall (3/15)	(Australia) Ken Rosewall (4/15)
1961	(United States) Pancho Gonzales (13/13)	(Australia) Ken Rosewall (5/15)	(Australia) Ken Rosewall (6/15)
1962	(United States) Butch Buchholz (1/1)	(Australia) Ken Rosewall (7/15)	(Australia) Ken Rosewall (8/15)
1963	(Australia) Ken Rosewall (9/15)	(Australia) Ken Rosewall (10/15)	(Australia) Ken Rosewall (11/15)
1964	(Australia) Rod Laver (1/8)	(Australia) Ken Rosewall (12/15)	(Australia) Rod Laver (2/8)
1965	(Australia) Ken Rosewall (13/15)	(Australia) Ken Rosewall (14/15)	(Australia) Rod Laver (3/8)
1966	(Australia) Rod Laver (4/8)	(Australia) Ken Rosewall (15/15)	(Australia) Rod Laver (5/8)
1967	(Australia) Rod Laver (6/8)	(Australia) Rod Laver (7/8)	(Australia) Rod Laver (8/8)

==== Doubles ====
Year	U.S. Pro	Wembley Pro	French Pro
1929	(Czechoslovakia) Karel Koželuh (United States) Vinny Richards	no competition	no competition
1930	(United States) Howard Kinsey (United States) Vincent Richards	no competition	(Czechoslovakia) Karel Koželuh (Germany) Roman Najuch
1931	(United States) Howard Kinsey (United States) Vincent Richards	no competition	
1932	(United States) Bruce Barnes (United States) Bill Tilden	no competition	
1933	(United States) Vincent Richards (United States) Charles Wood	no competition	no competition
1934	(United States) Bruce Barnes (France) Emmett Paré		
1935	(United States) George Lott (United States) Lester Stoefen	(United States) Bill Tilden (United States) Ellsworth Vines	(United States) Bill Tilden (United States) Ellsworth Vines
1936	(United States) Harold Blauer (United States) Charles Wood	no competition	(France) Henri Cochet (Republic of Ireland) Albert Burke
1937	(United States) George Lott (United States) Vincent Richards	(Germany) Hans Nüsslein (France) Martin Plaa	(United States) Lester Stoefen (United States) Bill Tilden
1938	(United Kingdom) Fred Perry (United States) Vincent Richards	no competition	(France) Martin Plaa (France) Robert Ramillon
1939	(United States) Bruce Barnes (United States) Keith Gledhill		(United States) Don Budge (United States) Ellsworth Vines
1940	(United States) Don Budge (United Kingdom) Fred Perry	no competition	no competition
1941	(United States) Don Budge (United Kingdom) Fred Perry	no competition	no competition
1942	(United States) Don Budge (United States) Bobby Riggs	no competition	no competition
1943	(United States) Bruce Barnes (United States) Gene Mako	no competition	no competition
1944	no competition	no competition	no competition
1945	(United States) Vincent Richards (United States) Bill Tilden	no competition	no competition
1946	(United States) Frank Kovacs (United Kingdom) Fred Perry	no competition	no competition
1947	(United States) Don Budge (United States) Bobby Riggs	no competition	no competition
1948	(United States) Jack Kramer (Ecuador) Pancho Segura	no competition	no competition
1949	(United States) Don Budge (United States) Frank Kovacs	(United States) Jack Kramer (United States) Bobby Riggs	no competition
1950	(United States) Frank Kovacs (United States) Welby Van Horn	(United States) Don Budge (United States) Pancho Gonzales	no competition
1951	(United States) Pancho Gonzales (Ecuador) Pancho Segura (Forest Hills)	(United States) Pancho Gonzales (Ecuador) Pancho Segura	no competition
1952	no competition	(United States) Pancho Gonzales (Ecuador) Pancho Segura	no competition
1953	(United States) Don Budge (United States) Pancho Gonzales	(United States) Don Budge (Australia) Frank Sedgman	no competition
1954	(United States) Pancho Gonzales (Ecuador) Pancho Segura (Cleveland) (Australia) Frank Sedgman (United States) Jack Kramer (Los Angeles)	no competition	no competition
1955	(United States) Jack Kramer (Ecuador) Pancho Segura	no competition	no competition
1956	(Australia) Rex Hartwig (United States) Tony Trabert	(United States) Pancho Gonzales (United States) Tony Trabert	(United States) Pancho Gonzales (United States) Tony Trabert
1957	(United States) Pancho Gonzales (Australia) Ken Rosewall	(Australia) Lew Hoad (Australia) Ken Rosewall	no competition
1958	(United States) Pancho Gonzales (Ecuador) Pancho Segura	(United States) Pancho Gonzales (Australia) Ken Rosewall	(Australia) Lew Hoad (United States) Tony Trabert
1959	no competition	(Australia) Lew Hoad (United States) Tony Trabert	(Australia) Lew Hoad (United States) Tony Trabert
1960	(Australia) Ashley Cooper (United States) Alex Olmedo	(Australia) Ken Rosewall (Australia) Frank Sedgman	(Australia) Lew Hoad (United States) Tony Trabert
1961	(Spain) Andrés Gimeno (Australia) Frank Sedgman	(Australia) Lew Hoad (Australia) Ken Rosewall	(Australia) Lew Hoad (Australia) Ken Rosewall
1962	(United States) Butch Buchholz (United States) Barry MacKay (tennis)	(Australia) Lew Hoad (Australia) Ken Rosewall	(Australia) Lew Hoad (Australia) Ken Rosewall
1963	(Australia) Rod Laver (Australia) Ken Rosewall	(United States) Alex Olmedo (Australia) Frank Sedgman	(Australia) Lew Hoad (Australia) Ken Rosewall
1964	no competition	(Australia) Lew Hoad (Australia) Ken Rosewall	(Australia) Lew Hoad (Australia) Ken Rosewall
1965	no competition	(United States) Butch Buchholz (Australia) Rod Laver	(Australia) Mal Anderson (Australia) Ken Rosewall
1966	(United States) Butch Buchholz (Australia) Rod Laver	(Australia) Lew Hoad (Australia) Ken Rosewall	(United States) Butch Buchholz (Australia) Rod Laver
1967	(United States) Dennis Ralston (Australia) Ken Rosewall	(Australia) Rod Laver (Australia) Fred Stolle	(France) Pierre Barthès (Spain) Andrés Gimeno

== Other important tournaments ==
The Championships at Wimbledon, the U.S. Championships, the French Championships, and the Australian Championships were typically the top events, where amateur players could compete for the title, albeit without prize money. Since the professional circuit was less organized and somewhat less popular than the amateur circuit, the professional events hierarchy changed each year. In 1934 the U.S. Pro was a high-class tournament with all top ranked pro players whereas in 1936 it was a meeting between pro teachers without any leading pro players. A tournament could even be canceled at any time due to poor attendance.

Consequently, for a given year a pro tournament was important when it attracted the best pro players and then another year this same tournament could be a second-rank tournament because few or no leading players came. Before the open era in addition to numerous small tournaments and head-to-head tours between the leading professionals, there were some major tournaments which stood out at different periods. Some survived sporadically because of financial collapses while others temporarily rose to the highest levels of competition when other tournaments weren't held. These include:

=== Bristol Cup: 1920–1932 ===
Sometimes labelled "Professional Championships of France" this tournament was held on the French Riviera at Menton, at Cannes.

=== Professional Championship of the World: 1927–1928 ===
This event was held in October on clay courts, at the Queen's Club in London. In 1928 Myers of the Daily Telegraph wrote that "this was the best pro tournament ever held in England."

List of Queen's Club Pro winners:

Year	Champion	Runner-up	Score
1927	(United Kingdom) Dan Maskell	(United Kingdom) Charles R Read	6–3, 6–3, 6–4
1928	(France) Robert Ramillon	(Republic of Ireland) Edmund Burke	6–1, 6–3, 5–7, 6–4

=== World Pro Championship: 1932–1933 ===
The World Pro Championship were held in 1932 and 1933 in Berlin at the Rot-Weiss club, on clay. It had a very large participation (over 80 players). According to Ray Bowers, the tournament at the time was regarded as the most prestigious professional tournament in the world.

List of World Pro winners:

Year	Champion	Runner-up
1932	(France) Martin Plaa	(United States) Bill Tilden
1933	(Nazi Germany) Hans Nüsslein	(United States) Bill Tilden

=== Bonnardel Cup: 1935–1937 ===
This was a team tournament created by Bill Tilden and modeled on the Davis Cup format. In 1935, early rounds in France were hoped to be played at Roland Garros, but the French Tennis Association would not allow the event to be played at the stadium.

Year	Champions
1935	France
1936	United States
1937	France

=== International Pro Championship of Britain: 1935–1939 ===
The International Pro Championship of Britain (also known as the Southport Pro, as well as the Southport Dunlop Cup for sponsorship purposes) was a professional tennis tournament held at Victoria Park in Southport between 1935 and 1939. It was open to professional players only, amateurs were not allowed to compete. The tournament was held on outdoor En-tout-cas, "all-weather" artificial clay.

List of International Pro Championship of Britain winners:

Year	Champion	Runner-up	Score
1935	(United States) Ellsworth Vines	(United States) Bill Tilden	6–1, 6–8, 4–6, 6–2, 6–2
1936	(Nazi Germany) Hans Nüsslein	(France) Henri Cochet	(Round Robin)
1937	(Nazi Germany) Hans Nüsslein	(France) Robert Ramillon	6–4, 6–3, 2–6, 6–4
1938	(Nazi Germany) Hans Nüsslein	(United States) Bill Tilden	(Round Robin)
1939	(Nazi Germany) Hans Nüsslein	(United States) Bill Tilden	6–2, 7–5, 6–4

	Doubles Champions	Runners-up	Score
1935	(United States) Bill Tilden (United States) Ellsworth Vines	(France) Martin Plaa (France) Robert Ramillon	7–5, 6–8, 5–7, 6–1, 6–3
1936	(France) Henri Cochet (France) Robert Ramillon	(United States) Lester Stoefen (United States) Bill Tilden	(Round Robin)
1937	(United States) Lester Stoefen (United States) Bill Tilden	(France) Martin Plaa (France) Robert Ramillon	8–6, 17–15, 8–6
1939	(United States) Don Budge (United States) Ellsworth Vines	(United States) Lester Stoefen (United States) Bill Tilden	6–2, 7–9, 7–5, 8–6

=== U.S. Pro Hard Courts: 1945–1946 ===
In LA; the only significant pro tournament of the last year of World War II, although missing Frank Kovacs and Welby Van Horn.

Year	Champion
1945	(United States) Bobby Riggs
1946	(United States) Bobby Riggs

=== Philadelphia U.S. Pro Indoor: 1950–1952 ===
Year	Champion
1950	(United States) Pancho Gonzales
1951	(United States) Jack Kramer
1952	(United States) Pancho Gonzales

=== Australian Pro: 1954 ===
The Australian Pro was a men's professional tournament held in 1954 and it was billed as the Australian Professional Championships.

=== Tournament of Champions: 1957–1959 ===
The Tournament of Champions was a prominent professional tennis tournament series between 1957 and 1959. The tournament was held on the grass-courts of Forest Hills, New York, between 1957 and 1959, and an Australian version of the Tournament of Champions was held on grass at White City, Sydney in 1957 and 1959, and at Kooyong Stadium in Melbourne in 1958. The 1957 and 1958 Forest Hills tournaments had a round robin format, while the 1959 Forest Hills was an elimination tournament with 10 players. The Sydney version was an elimination event, while the 1958 Kooyong event was a round robin format.

The 1957 Forest Hills Tournament of Champions was broadcast live nationally in the U.S.A. on the CBS television network in its entirety, the only known professional tennis tournament in the U.S.A. to achieve this status before the Open Era. (The CBS Dallas pro tennis tournament in 1965 was filmed and broadcast one match at a time in a weekly series.) The 1959 Forest Hills Tournament of Champions offered the largest winners' cheques of the year. The current designation by the West Side Tennis Club of the 1957–59 Forest Hills TOC is "WCT Tournament of Champions". Kramer's contemporary brochures described the Ampol series, of which the 1959 Forest Hills TOC was a part, with the term "World Championship Tennis".

The 1958 Kooyong Tournament of Champions was the richest tournament of the series, with a prize money of 10,000 Australian pounds (US$24,000).

List of Tournament of Champions winners:
Forest Hills (New York)

Year	Champion	Runner-up	Score
1957	(United States) Pancho Gonzales	(Australia) Frank Sedgman	(Round Robin)
1958	(United States) Pancho Gonzales	(Australia) Ken Rosewall	(Round Robin)
1959	(Australia) Lew Hoad	(United States) Pancho Gonzales	6–1, 5–7, 6–2, 6–1

White City (Sydney) and Kooyong (Melbourne)

Year	Champion	Runner-up	Score
1957	(Ecuador) Pancho Segura	(Australia) Frank Sedgman	7–5, 6–0, 6–4
1958	(Australia) Lew Hoad	(Australia) Frank Sedgman	(Round Robin)
1959	(United States) Pancho Gonzales	(Australia) Lew Hoad	11–9, 6–1, 6–1

=== Masters Pro: 1956–1965 ===
Round Robin in Los Angeles, held from 1956 to 1960, and again in 1964, 1965, and 1967. The Ampol Masters Pro was held at White City in Sydney in 1958.

Masters Pro winners:

Year	Champion	Runner-up	Score
1956	(United States) Pancho Gonzales	(Australia) Frank Sedgman	(Round Robin)
1957	(United States) Pancho Gonzales	(Australia) Frank Sedgman	(Round Robin)
1958	(Ecuador) Pancho Segura (L.A. Tennis Club)	(United States) Pancho Gonzales	(Round Robin)
1958	(Australia) Frank Sedgman (Sydney White City)	(United States) Tony Trabert	3–6, 4–6, 7–5, 6–3, 6–4
1959	(United States) Pancho Gonzales	(Australia) Lew Hoad	(Round Robin)
1960	(Australia) Ken Rosewall		
1964	(Australia) Ken Rosewall	(Australia) Frank Sedgman	6–2, 6–4
1965	(Australia) Rod Laver	(United States) Pancho Gonzales	3–6, 6–3, 7–5

=== Kramer Cup: 1961–1963 ===
A team format tournament.

Year	Champions
1961	Australia
1962	Australia
1963	Australia

=== Madison Square Garden Pro: 1966–1967 ===
Madison Square Garden Pro winners:

Year	Champion	Runner-up	Score
1954	(United States) Pancho Gonzales	(Ecuador) Pancho Segura	7–9, 6–4, 6–4
1966	(Australia) Ken Rosewall	(Australia) Rod Laver	6–3, 6–3
1967	(Australia) Rod Laver	(Australia) Ken Rosewall	6–4, 6–4
1968	(Australia) Tony Roche	(United States) Pancho Gonzales	6–3, 6–4
1969	(Australia) Rod Laver	(Australia) Roy Emerson	6–2, 4–6, 6–1

=== Forest Hills Pro: 1966 ===
The Forest Hills Pro was held in June 1966 on the grass courts of the West Side Tennis Club using the VASSS Scoring System.

Forest Hills Pro winner:

Year	Champion
1966	(Australia) Rod Laver

=== Wimbledon Pro: 1967 ===
The Wimbledon World Professional Championship, also known as the Wimbledon Pro, was held in August 1967. It was first time that professional tennis players played on Centre Court at Wimbledon. The tournament was sponsored and broadcast by the BBC to mark the invention of colour television.

Wimbledon Pro winner:

Year	Champion	Runner-up	Score
1967	(Australia) Rod Laver	(Australia) Ken Rosewall	6–2, 6–2, 12–10

== Bibliography ==
- McCauley, Joe (2000). The History of Professional Tennis. Windsor: The Short Run Book Company Limited.
