= George Lyttleton Rogers =

Irish tennis player (1906-1962)

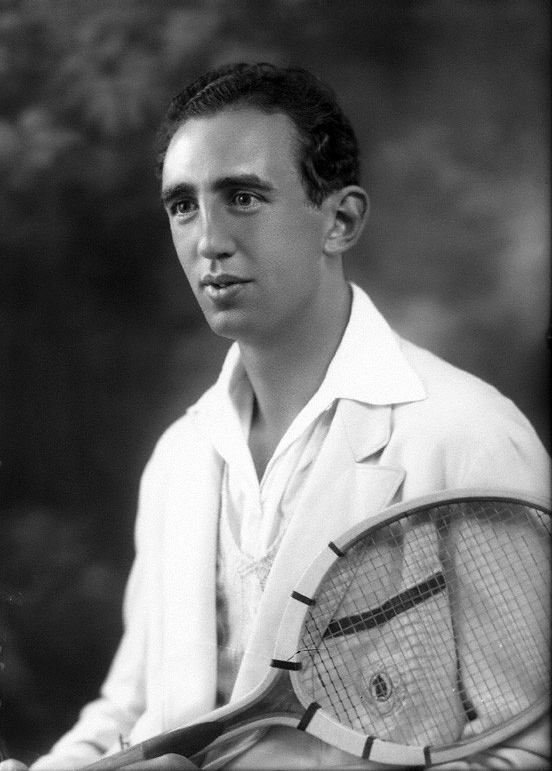
- Country (sports): Ireland
- Born: 10 July 1906 Athy, Ireland
- Died: 19 November 1962 (aged 56) Los Angeles, United States
- Height: 2.01 m (6 ft 7 in)
- Turned pro: 1926 (amateur tour); 1945 (pro tour)
- Plays: Right-handed

Singles
- Career record: 537-224 (70.5%)
- Career titles: 39

Grand Slam singles results
- French Open: QF (1930, 1932)
- Wimbledon: 4R (1933)
- US Open: 4R (1930)

Other tournaments
- Professional majors
- US Pro: 3R (1945)

Doubles
- Highest ranking: No. 1 (1947)

Grand Slam doubles results
- French Open: 2R (1930)
- Wimbledon: QF (1935)

Team competitions
- Davis Cup: SF^{Eu} (1936)

George Lyttleton Rogers (10 July 1906 – 19 November 1962) was an Irish tennis player, promoter and coach. He won the Irish Championships title three times, (1926, 1936–1937). He was the Canadian and Argentine champion as well. He was a three times runner-up for the Monte Carlo Cup. In 1931 he was the eleventh on the French rankings.

== Early life and family ==
Rogers was born on 10 July 1906 in Athy, County Kildare, Ireland to Anglo-Irish Protestants parents Francis William Lyttelton Rogers, an inspector in the Royal Irish Constabulary, and Hessie May Lloyd Sherrie Rogers. Both his elder brothers were killed in action in the First World War while serving in France with the Royal Field Artillery; Francis Lyttelton Lloyd Rogers (4 February 1895 – 7 January 1916) was killed in action in Neuve Chapelle and Richard Henry Lyster Rogers (18 September 1896 – 4 October 1917) was killed in Arras. His great-grandparents Daniel Upton and Marie Lloyd Upton were land-owners in Dublin. In the Irish War of Independence the family home, "Holyrood Castle" in Sandymount, was requisitioned as a machine gun nest by the British Army. His aunt Alice Upton Harvey was a famous Irish music composer. His cousin was George U. Harvey, borough president of Queens between 1929 and 1941. Rogers studied in the Imperial Service College in Windsor.

== Amateur tennis career ==
In April 1928, he was defeated by the Austrian champion Erik Worm for the Beaulieu title. and the next year it happened again but this time he suffered defeat from Emmanuel du Plaix.

1930

In the first days of January, Rogers was repulsed in the final of the Beausite tournament in Cannes by Paul Barrelet de Ricou in straight sets. In the follow-up tournament of Monaco he was beaten in the title match by French riviera-series debutant Bill Tilden in four sets and lost the doubles as well with partner Arne Wilhelm Grahn to Tilden and Charles Herbert Kingsley. In January–February, he entered several riviera tournaments; at New Courts de Cannes doubles contest the Tilden-Kingsley duo saw another victory in the final against Rogers and Worm. At Gallia L.T.C. Cannes, he was stopped in the semifinals of singles and doubles and in the quarterfinal of the mixed doubles. At Carlton L.T.C. Cannes, he lost the Italy's fourth ranked player Placido Gaslini.

For the Beaumont Trophy at Monte-Carlo doubles event Rogers and Tamio Abe were overcame Umberto De Morpurgo and Wilbur Coen. In Menton, he reached the semifinals in singles and doubles. In March, at the Nice Lawn Tennis Club competition the last two, Tilden and Rogers met again but Rogers was unable to overcome Tilden. In late March at the Cannes Championships, the doubles team of Rogers and René Gallepe were subdued by seasoned American duo of Tilden-Coen. At the L. T. C. Biarritz tournament, Raymond Rodel captured the title ahead of Rogers. Henri Cochet and Pierre Landry beat the Rogers Féret duo for the doubles crown. In June he clinched the third place at the Belgian International Championships. In July, he won the Canadian Lawn Tennis National Championships against home-favourite Gilbert Nunns in four sets. During the year 1930 he swept 18 international titles.

1931

In January, he started the season at the Beausite–L.T.C. de Cannes Championship where he captured the title against Swiss Charles Aeschlimann who took revenge in the doubles final on Rogers and Hillyard. In the Beausite tournament, he was finally victorious against Paul Féret who came back from professional tennis to amateur play. They teamed up for the doubles where they couldn't convert two match points against Hillyard and Vladimir Landau, which backfired on them and lost in five sets. In mixed doubles, Rogers and Elizabeth Ryan found their winning form against Phyllis Satterthwaite and Erik Worm and became mixed champions. In the Parc Imperial L.T.C. de Nice Rogers had an easy victory over Edmond Lotan and in the mixed doubles he and Mrs. Marjollet defeated Mikhail Sumarokov-Elston and Mrs. Franke. At Gallia L.T.C. de Cannes Rogers faced Jacques Brugnon for the championship, and Brugnon was triumphant in a five-set match although he gave Rogers two zero-sets. Also in Cannes at the Carlton Club, Brugnon and Henri Cochet fought a four-set battle against the losing team of Rogers-Aeschlimann.

In February at the Beaulieu Championships of Hotel Bristol, Rogers reclaimed the title from his opponent two years before, Emmanuel du Plaix in a close five-set encounter. He and John Olliff went for the doubles title as well, only losing to the Yugoslavian pair of Franjo Šefer and Franjo Kukuljević. In the Championships of Monaco Henri Cochet proved to be an impassable opposition for Rogers and bagged his third Monaco title. He reached his best Menton result by winning the tournament alongside Hungarian Béla von Kehrling in a rematch with Kukuljević-Šefer. In Bordighera he met his Hungarian partner in the singles final, where in the deciding fifth set the Irishman took a 5–1 lead when Kehrling came up to one game difference but eventually lost the game, set and match due to an umpire mistake. Rogers also clinched the doubles with Alberto Del Bono against Kehrling and Vladimir Landau.

In March, in the second meeting of L.T.C. de Cannes, Rogers repeated his feat against the same opponent Charles Aeschlimann but this time he and Hillyard was also victorious in doubles as well against the Swiss team of Aeschlimann and Hector Chiesa. In the third Cannes tournament of the year, Hyotaro Sato surpassed Rogers for the singles, but the American-Irish couple of Rogers-Ryan captured the mixed contest from Hillyard- Satterthwaite. In May in the 31st Campionato Partenopeo, Rogers finished first ahead of ambidextrous Italian Giorgio de Stefani, who equalized in the doubles final.

In July, although losing in the second round of the Wimbledon Championships to the aforementioned Sato, Rogers was a contestant for the All England Plate, a consolation tournament played by the losers of the first two rounds of the men's singles main draw, in which Vernon Kirby overcame him in three sets. In the Le Touquet Spa Championships he chose Lucilo del Castillo for the doubles but lost to eventual victors Cochet-Marcel Bernard. In December the Fédération Française de Tennis compiled the annual French tennis rankings, but that year they included players of all nationality provided that they played and represented a French sports club. Rogers was ranked the 11th French player.

1932

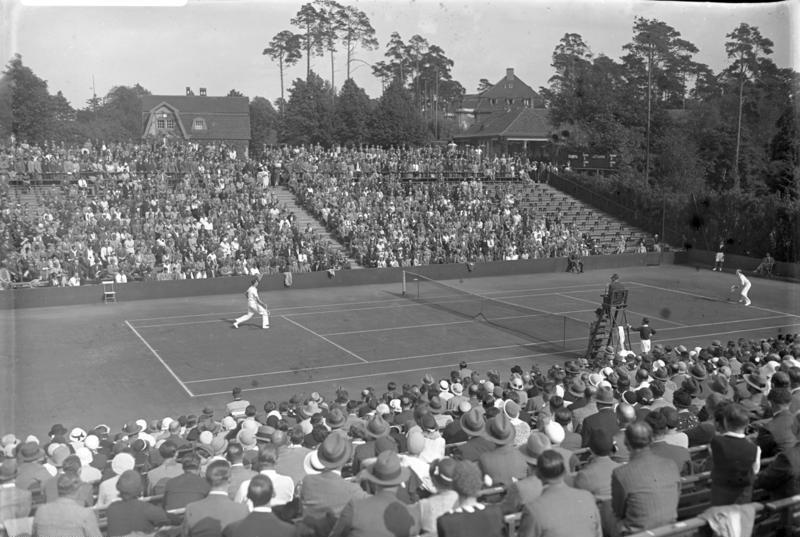
George Lyttleton-Rogers (left) playing against Germany in the 1932 Davis Cup

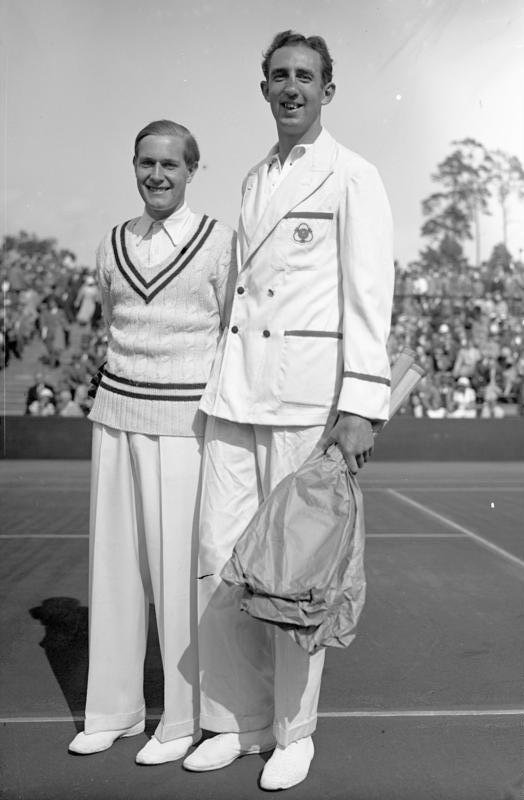
George Lyttleton-Rogers (right) and Gottfried von Cramm at the 1932 Davis Cup

In the first tournament of the season at Beausite, Rogers defended his last year's title against Erik Worm. He went on to win the doubles and was only repelled in the mixed finals. At New Courts L.T.C. de Cannes he fought Emmanuel du Plaix in a tough match for his first New Courts singles title and battled through another five-set struggle for the doubles. Although he had a clean victory in the mixed doubles with Miss Ryan. At the Gallia L T.C. de Cannes he tried to take revenge for his last year loss to Jacques Brugnon also this time he was forced to give the Frenchman a walkover victory in singles only after losing in the doubles to the French team of du Plaix-Brugnon. In the Carlton Club he finally came to win against Brugnon, but this time he did it three times in a row in singles and both doubles, claiming his first triple crown reward.

In his second Monte Carlo Cup final, he was topped by Roderich Menzel. In San Remo he finished second again behind Béla von Kehrling. In doubles the Hungarian team of Kehrling-Imre Zichy suffered defeat from Rogers and Aoki Miki. For the third time that year Kehrling and Rogers faced each other in the Alassio tournament final, where it was Kehrling who celebrated a flawless victory. Rogers paired with Emanuele Sertorio and grabbed the doubles title. In May, Fred Perry defeated Rogers for British Hard Court Championships crown. In August, he became the champion of North of England and a month later he attached the South of England title, too, after beating Madan Mohan in straight sets.

Later years

In 1933, he won the doubles trophy of the Club Carlton in Cannes, partnering Edmond Lotan in a five-set battle with William Radcliffe and Willem Karsten. In March he was unsuccessful for the third time in the Monte-Carlo final, this time falling short to Bunny Austin. In August, in the Derbyshire Championships in Buxton he was the runner-up in both men's and mixed doubles. At the end of the month, he was featured in the doubles final of the North of England Championships with Vernon Kirby. In February 1934, in the mixed doubles Nice final, Rogers and Sylvia Henrotin of France were unable to stop Miss Muriel Thomas and Wilmer Hines. Later that year, he claimed the Northern tournament championships trophy for the first time against Cam Malfroy, and together they won the doubles title. In August, he saw another doubles final partnering Aoki Miki at the North of England Championships, this time losing to Stedman-Andrews.

In 1935, in his fourth successive North of England competition, Rogers was deprived from his doubles title by Frank Wilde and Don Butler. For the singles he took on his doubles partner Alan Stedman but was easily beaten. In April at Melbury final Bunny Austin annihilated the Irishman, allowing only three games to him. In the 1937 Wimbledon Championships, his first-round match against Bunny Austin was the first ever televised tennis event in Great Britain that was broadcast to 2000 homes throughout the British Isles. He won his second Manchester title later the year. In 1938 he became the Bournemouth hard court doubles champion alongside Kho Sin-Kie with whom he scored a five-set victory over Wilde-Butler.

Between 1929 and 1939, he played 49 rubbers in 17 ties for the Irish Davis Cup team and has a record of 24 wins and 25 losses. The best performance of the Irish Davis Cup team during this period was reaching the semifinal of the Europe zone in 1936 which they lost to 0–5 to the German team composed of Gottfried von Cramm and Henner Henkel.

== During World War II ==
During the war, he resided in the United States and competed in the U.S. National Championships in 1940, 1941 and 1942, losing in the third round and second rounds respectively. In 1940, he reached the semifinals of the New York State Clay Court Tennis championship. In 1941, he was defeated in the final of the Perth Amboy Invitation championship by Bill Umstaedter. In 1942, he was a runner-up for the Florida West Coast Championships, where junior prodigy Francisco Segura of Ecuador took advantage of Rogers' recrudescent shoulder injury and grabbed the title. He organized a tour of tennis shows in order to raise money for the Red Cross in 1942.

In 1944, he played exhibitions for the Harbor Defenses of San Francisco with then-enlisted Frank Kovacs and Margaret Osborne. He played an exhibition match in May 1945 with Bill Tilden, Vincent Richards and Eli Epstein whereas the players' racquets were awarded to the spectator with the most war bond purchase to support the United States Army. He turned pro in March 1945 and played the undercard match at the W.P.T.A. World Professional Championships but failed to beat Bill Tilden. He then registered for the 1945 U.S. Pro Tennis Championships in June where he was eliminated in the third round by Walter Senior.

== Pro career ==
The same month he turned pro player, Rogers also became the president of the World Pro Tennis Association. In the meantime, he continued to compete as a pro player as well. In 1945 he released the WPTA top-ten pro rankings. In 1946 he quit the U.S. Professional Lawn Tennis Association to join the newly formed Professional Tennis Players' Association headed by Bill Tilden. In 1947 he became the World Pro doubles champion alongside Frank Kovacs, but fell in the quarterfinal stage of the World Pro Championships series in singles to Wayne Sabin. At the start of August 1951, shortly after beginning a tour with Frank Kovacs and Frank Parker, Kovacs and Lyttleton Rogers disappeared and did not play scheduled fixtures, leaving Parker on his own. Kovacs and Lyttleton Rogers were longtime friends, and Rogers was married on September 2 in California. As a senior he kept on competing, e.g. in the Eastern Senior Tournament in 1957 where he lost to Herbert A. Baron in the second round.

== Playing style ==
At the peak of his career in 1932, Rogers' play was observed by Great Britain's then active Davis Cup player Nigel Sharpe, who described Rogers as the tallest man on the field at the time who took advantage of his height. From the baseline he had great reach, but in volleying lacked sufficient quickness to cover the net at its full length and moved uncomfortably in the forecourt. So he was one of the few baseliners of his time. He hit the ball flat and with a short swing. His first serve had great speed, while the second was rather a kick-serve, which showed to be his weakness. His forehand drive was strong and his overhead smashes were fine enough. In doubles he positioned himself between the T-line and the baseline, an unorthodox gameplan.

== Personal life ==
Apart from playing tennis, Rogers was an amateur boxer. He was trained by Don McCorkindale in Slough, with whom he had a scheduled sparring bout in Bedford although it was later cancelled because it would have been a breach of amateur boxing rules. He also coached tennis to younger talents such as Alice Lavery, who reached the finals of the Cannes handicap tournament.

In 1931, he was engaged to Marjorie Schiele, a 19-year-old Cincinnati heiress, however the engagement was called off the next year. At that time, he resided at the French Riviera. His wife died in a hospital during a surgery in Montreux, Switzerland in 1937. Rogers married again in 1939 to Swiss-born Greta Konenberg, a fashion travel agent to whom he was introduced three years before. They incidentally met again in the Sporting Club of Monte Carlo after his wife's death.

Rogers divorced and married for the third time in 1951 to June Sears of California, a University of California graduate in merchandising and subsequent real estate agent with whom he settled in Los Angeles. He died at Los Angeles County General Hospital in 1962.
