= Southern Pro Championships =

Defunct tennis tournament
- Tour: Pro Tennis Tour (1928-35, 1940-1967)
- Founded: 1928; 97 years ago
- Abolished: 1967; 58 years ago
- Location: Birmingham; Coral Gables; Jacksonville; Memphis; Sewanee; Tuscaloosa; West Palm Beach
- Surface: Clay / outdoor

The Southern Pro Championships also known as the Southern Professional Championships was a men's international professional tennis tournament founded in 1928. It was first played at the Palm Beach Tennis Club, West Palm Beach, Florida, United States. It ran semi-annually until 1967 when it was discontinued.

== History ==
In March 1927 a Palm Beach Professional Tournament was first held at the Palm Beach Tennis Club, that event was won by Paul Heston, this was the first pro event held in the United States. In 1928 that tournament was replaced by first Southern Professional Championships tournament. In 1936 a Palm Beach Professional Championship men's tennis tournament was re-established, and was played on outdoor clay courts at Breakers Tennis Club, West Palm Beach, Florida, United States, this tournament replaced the Southern Pro Championships, which had been held in West Palm Beach from 1928 to 1935. In 1940 the Southern Pro tournament was revived. The event ran semi-annually in different locations until 1967 when it was discontinued.

== Finals ==
=== Singles ===
(Incomplete roll)

| Year | Location | Champions | Runners-up | Score |
|---|---|---|---|---|
| 1928 | West Palm Beach | (United States) Vincent Richards | (United States) Paul Heston | 6–2, 5–7, 6–1, 6–1. |
| 1929 | West Palm Beach | (South Africa) Brian Norton | (United States) Vincent Richards | 8–6, 7–5, 6–1. |
| 1930 | West Palm Beach | (United States) Vincent Richards | (United States) Paul Heston | 6–0, 7–5, 6–3. |
| 1931 | West Palm Beach | (United States) Paul Heston | (United States) James Kenney | 6–1, 6–2, 6–3. |
| 1932 | West Palm Beach | (United States) Paul Heston | (United States) James Kenney | 6–1, 6–1, 6–3. |
| 1933 | West Palm Beach | (United States) Robert K Murray | (United States) Paul Heston | 8–6, 5–7, 6–3, 7–5. |
| 1934 | West Palm Beach | (Czechoslovakia) Karel Koželuh | (Germany) Hans Nüsslein | 6–2, 6–8, 6–1, 4–6, 6–4. |
| 1935 | West Palm Beach | (Czechoslovakia) Karel Koželuh | (United States) Herman Peterson | 6–0, 6–1, 6–1. |
| 1942 | Coral Gables | (United States) Wayne Sabin | (United States) Dick Skeen | 6–3, 4–6, 6–1 6–4. |
| 1946 | Memphis | (United States) Don Budge | (United States) Bobby Riggs | 6–2, 1–6, 4–6, 6–3 6–4. |
| 1958 | Tuscaloosa | (Brazil) Armando Vieira | (United States) Jack Rodgers | 3–6, 6–4, 6–1. |
| 1959 | Tuscaloosa | (United States) Sam Giammalva | (United States) Bobby Riggs | 6–4, 6–2. |
| 1961 | Jacksonville | (Australia) Jack Arkinstall | (United States) Don Budge | 6–3, 6–0. |
| 1963 | Birmingham | (United States) Jason Morton | (United States) Jerry Evert | 6–4, 7–5. |
| 1966 | Sewanee | (United States) Dell Sylvia | (United States) Earl Baumgardner | 3–6, 6–3, 7–5. |
| 1967 | Sewanee | (United States) Earl Baumgardner | (United States) Dell Sylvia | 1–6, 6–4, 6–3. |
