= John Nogrady =

American tennis player and coach

- Country (sports): United States
- Born: May 7, 1914; New York, USA
- Died: May 21, 2007 (aged 93); New York, USA

Singles

Grand Slam singles results
- US Open: 2R (1933, 1935, 1936)
- Professional majors
- US Pro: F (1943, 1944)

John Nogrady (May 7, 1914 – May 21, 2007) was an American male tennis player and coach who was active in the 1940s and 1950s and twice reached the final of the U.S. Pro Tennis Championships.

== Biography ==
In February 1940 Nogrady participated in his first professional tournament at the Southeastern Pro championships, played on clay courts at Flamingo Park, Miami and defeated four-time winner of the U.S. Pro Tennis Championships Vinnie Richards before being beaten by Grand Slam winner Don Budge.

In 1940 Nogrady took part in the U.S. Pro Tennis Championships for the first time. The tournament was held in September at the Chicago Town and Tennis Club and Nogrady reached the semifinal after victories over Richards and Karel Koželuh. In the semifinal he lost in four sets to Fred Perry. He lost again to Perry, this time in straight sets, in the quarterfinal of the 1941 edition and to Budge in the quarterfinal of the 1942 tournament.

He reached the final of the U.S. Pro Tennis Championships in 1943 and 1944. In 1943 he lost the final to Bruce Barnes in five sets and in 1944 Welby Van Horn defeated him in straight sets.

After his active playing career had ended Nogrady became a tennis coach for, among others, Bill Talbert, Ron Holmberg and Dick Savitt. Additionally he often trained celebrities including Grace Kelly and Errol Flynn.

Nogrady was inducted into the Eastern Lawn Tennis Association Hall of Fame in 1993. He was married to Joyce Nogrady and had four sons. He died in New York on May 21, 2007, at the age 93.

== Pro Slam tournaments ==
=== Singles: 2 (2 runners-up) ===
Result	Year	Championship	Surface	Opponent	Score
Loss	1943	US Pro Championships	Clay	(United States) Bruce Barnes	1–6, 9–7, 5–7, 6–4, 3–6
Loss	1944	US Pro Championships	Clay	(United States) Welby Van Horn	4–6, 2–6, 2–6
