= 100 Greatest of All Time =

2012 television series about tennis players

- Genre: Sports
- Presented by: Jack Nicklaus; Jerry Rice; Wayne Gretzky; Lisa Leslie; Carl Lewis
- No. of seasons: 1
- No. of episodes: 5

Original release
- Network: Tennis Channel
- Release: March 2012 – March 23, 2012

100 Greatest of All Time was a sports television series of five one-hour episodes, produced and first aired by the Tennis Channel in March 2012. It presented a list of 100 tennis players to be considered the greatest of all time, both men and women. The series was hosted by Jack Nicklaus, Jerry Rice, Wayne Gretzky, Lisa Leslie and Carl Lewis. Many retired tennis luminaries provided commentary, including Rod Laver, Billie Jean King, Chris Evert, Björn Borg, John McEnroe, Martina Navratilova, Pete Sampras, and Andre Agassi.

== Background ==
An international panel of tennis experts determined this ranking of 62 men and 38 women. The United States was credited with the most great players (38), followed by Australia (17), France (7), Great Britain (6) and Czechoslovakia (5). Forty-three players made the list from the Americas, 39 from Europe and 18 from Oceania.

Grand Slam singles titles (Australian, French, Wimbledon and US tournaments) column figures reflect number of wins as of March 2012 when the list was published. In addition to that, the pre-Open Era Pro major tournaments (three professional events) were included: the U.S. Pro Championships (first held in 1927), French Pro Championship (first held in 1930) and Wembley Championships (started in 1934). Only male tennis players that turned from amateurs to pros were able to participate in those. (Note: except for 1956 & 1960 U.S. Pro Tennis Championships where also women could have participate. Pauline Betz and Althea Gibson won one event each respectively) The Open Era started in 1968 and all three pro majors tournaments were quickly relegated to lesser events and were all defunct by the 1990s.

Prior to 1924, the International Lawn Tennis Federation (ILTF) recognized two other events as world championships. The "World Hard Court Championships" (WHCC) and the "World Covered Court Championships" (WCCC). Between 1913 and 1923 Wimbledon was known as the World Grass Court Championships (WGCC), also sanctioned by the ILTF.

In 1924 ILTF designated the Australasian, French, British and American championship tournaments as the new four majors. 1925 was the first season held with all these four major tournaments opened to all amateurs.

== Achievements ==
‡ The Grand Slam, winning all four Grand Slam tournament singles titles (Australian, French, Wimbledon and US) in one calendar year was achieved six times by five different players: Don Budge in 1938, Maureen Connolly in 1953, Rod Laver in 1962 & 1969, Margaret Court in 1970 and Steffi Graf in 1988.

◊ The Pro Grand Slam, winning all three professional slam singles titles (U.S., French and Wembley) in one calendar year was achieved by Ken Rosewall in 1963 and by Rod Laver in 1967.

† Anthony Wilding is the only Triple World Champion. In 1913, he won all three ILTF singles titles, the World Covered Court Championships (WCCC), the World Hard Court Championships (WHCC) and Wimbledon Championships (also known as World Grass Court Championships or simply WGCC).

== Top 100 ranking per Tennis Channel in 2012 ==
Rank	Name	Gender	Nationality	Majors			
Rank	Name	Gender	Nationality	ILTF chps.	Pro Slam	Grand Slam (March 2012)	Total (Current)
1	Roger Federer	♂	SUI			16	20
2	Rod Laver ‡ ◊ ‡	♂	AUS		8	11	19
3	Steffi Graf ‡	♀	FRG/GER			22	22
4	Martina Navratilova	♀	TCH/USA			18	18
5	Pete Sampras	♂	USA			14	14
6	Rafael Nadal	♂	ESP			10	22
7	Björn Borg	♂	SWE			11	11
8	Margaret Court ‡	♀	AUS			24	24
9	Chris Evert	♀	USA			18	18
10	Billie Jean King	♀	USA			12	12
11	Don Budge ‡	♂	USA		4	6	10
12	Andre Agassi	♂	USA			8	8
13	John McEnroe	♂	USA			7	7
14	Serena Williams	♀	USA			13	23
15	Jimmy Connors	♂	USA			8	8
16	Bill Tilden	♂	USA	1	4	10	15
17	Roy Emerson	♂	AUS			12	12
18	Ivan Lendl	♂	TCH/USA			8	8
19	Monica Seles	♀	YUG/USA			9	9
20	Ken Rosewall ◊	♂	AUS		15	8	23
21	Boris Becker	♂	FRG/GER			6	6
22	**Venus Williams**	♀	USA			7	7
23	Fred Perry	♂	GBR		2	8	10
24	Suzanne Lenglen	♀	FRA	4		8	12
25	Stefan Edberg	♂	SWE			6	6
26	Justine Henin	♀	BEL			7	7
27	Maureen Connolly ‡	♀	USA			9	9
28	Arthur Ashe	♂	USA			3	3
29	Helen Wills	♀	USA			19	19
30	Martina Hingis	♀	SUI			5	5
31	John Newcombe	♂	AUS			7	7
32	Lew Hoad	♂	AUS		1	4	5
33	Mats Wilander	♂	SWE			7	7
34	Jack Kramer	♂	USA		2	3	5
35	Pancho Gonzalez	♂	USA		12	2	14
36	René Lacoste	♂	FRA			7	7
37	Evonne Goolagong Cawley	♀	AUS			7	7
38	Maria Bueno	♀	BRA			7	7
39	Althea Gibson	♀	USA		1	5	6
40	**Novak Djokovic**	♂	SCG/SRB			5	24
41	Guillermo Vilas	♂	ARG			4	4
42	Jim Courier	♂	USA			4	4
43	Lindsay Davenport	♀	USA			3	3
44	Arantxa Sánchez Vicario	♀	ESP			4	4
45	Kim Clijsters	♀	BEL			4	4
46	Henri Cochet	♂	FRA	3	1	7	11
47	Jean Borotra	♂	FRA			4	4
48	Frank Sedgman	♂	AUS		2	5	7
49	Ilie Năstase	♂	ROU			2	2
50	Tony Trabert	♂	USA		2	5	7
51	Doris Hart	♀	USA			6	6
52	Jack Crawford	♂	AUS			6	6
53	Tracy Austin	♀	USA			2	2
54	Manuel Santana	♂	ESP			4	4
55	Gustavo Kuerten	♂	BRA			3	3
56	Stan Smith	♂	USA			2	2
57	Jennifer Capriati	♀	USA			3	3
58	Alice Marble	♀	USA			5	5
59	Margaret Osborne duPont	♀	USA			6	6
60	Virginia Wade	♀	GBR			3	3
61	Neale Fraser	♂	AUS			3	3
62	Hana Mandlíková	♀	TCH			4	4
63	Lleyton Hewitt	♂	AUS			2	2
64	Ellsworth Vines	♂	USA		5	3	8
65	Pancho Segura	♂	ECU		4	0	4
66	Bobby Riggs	♂	USA		3	3	6
67	Fred Stolle	♂	AUS			2	2
68	Helen Hull Jacobs	♀	USA			5	5
69	Louise Brough	♀	USA			6	6
70	Patrick Rafter	♂	AUS			2	2
71	Maria Sharapova	♀	RUS			3	5
72	Gottfried Von Cramm	♂	(Germany) / (Germany) /FRG			2	2
73	Jaroslav Drobný	♂	TCH			3	3
74	Tony Roche	♂	AUS			1	1
75	Pauline Betz Addie	♀	USA		1	5	6
76	William Renshaw	♂	GBR			7	7
77	Molla Mallory	♀	NOR/USA			8	8
78	Ashley Cooper	♂	AUS			4	4
79	Gabriela Sabatini	♀	ARG			1	1
80	Marat Safin	♂	RUS			2	2
81	Vic Seixas	♂	USA			2	2
82	Yevgeny Kafelnikov	♂	RUS			2	2
83	Jan Kodeš	♂	TCH			3	3
84	Norman Brookes	♂	AUS			3	3
85	Yannick Noah	♂	FRA			1	1
86	Anthony Wilding †	♂	NZL	3		6	9
87	Mary Pierce	♀	FRA			2	2
88	Amélie Mauresmo	♀	FRA			2	2
89	Dorothea Lambert Chambers	♀	GBR			7	7
90	Bill Johnston	♂	USA	1		3	4
91	Shirley Fry Irvin	♀	USA			4	4
92	Svetlana Kuznetsova	♀	RUS			2	2
93	Nicola Pietrangeli	♂	ITA			2	2
94	Andy Roddick	♂	USA			1	1
95	Thomas Muster	♂	AUT			1	1
96	Manuel Orantes	♂	ESP			1	1
97	Pat Cash	♂	AUS			1	1
98	Bunny Austin	♂	GBR			0	0
99	Ann Haydon-Jones	♀	GBR			3	3
100	Michael Chang	♂	USA			1	1

Notes:

- **Bolded** players are still active today.
- Empty spots in the table mean player did not participate in any of those tournaments.

== See also ==
- The 40 Greatest Players of the Tennis Era
- The 50 Greatest Players of the Open Era
