= Dick Skeen =

American tennis player

- Full name: Richard Edgar Skeen
- Country (sports): United States
- Born: March 15, 1906 Dallas, Texas, U.S.
- Died: June 24, 1990 (aged 84) Medford, Oregon, U.S.
- Height: 5 ft 10 in (178 cm)
- Turned pro: 1935 (amateur from 1930)
- Retired: 1946
- Plays: Right-handed (one-handed backhand)
- College: None

Singles
- Highest ranking: No. 2 (1941, Ray Bowers, 2006
- Professional majors
- US Pro: F (1941)

Richard Edgar Skeen (March 15, 1906 – June 24, 1990) was an American professional tennis player and teacher. He was runner-up to Fred Perry in the Men's Singles in the 1941 U.S. Pro Tennis Championships, reaching as high as World No. 2 pro that year according to Ray Bowers (and No. 4 in his amateur-pro combined rankings). Skeen reached the semifinals of other tournaments on four occasions that year. Bill Tilden recommended Dick as an outstanding Tennis Teacher in California in his 1950 book, 'How to Play Better Tennis'.

== Biography ==
Dick Skeen was born in Dallas, Texas in 1906 and died in Medford, Oregon in 1990 at age 84. Tennis player, Dale Jensen, became a student and close friend at the Balboa Bay Club, and encouraged Dick to write a tennis book, entitled Tennis Champions are Made, not Born, published in 1976. Dale used this knowledge to teach Mike Carrico. Dale and Dick remained close friends until Dick died in 1990. Skeen taught three World Champions (Jack Kramer, Louise Brough, and Pauline Betz) and forty National Champions, including Billy Talbert, George Richards, Gussie Moran, Kathleen Harter, Carole Caldwell, Julius Heldman and Jimmy Wade. Skeen was ranked No. 2, Nationally in the United States in 1941, and #1 in the National Senior 65-and-over in 1972, after a 28-year layoff.

In 1918, Skeen arrived in Southern California with his family and learned to play tennis on three courts in Hollywood. In 1931, he turned professional and began his tennis teaching career in Pasadena. Skeen became a legendary tennis teacher, according to Bill Tilden and Jack Kramer. He was known for his classic stroke production and his emphasis on the backhand chop, not the slice. After Pasadena, Skeen taught on private courts in Beverly Hills, then at the Rivera Country Club, the Balboa Bay Club, was hired by George Holstein, developer, and Larry Johnson, part owner, to design and be General Manager at the Newport Beach Tennis Club, founded the Blossom Hill Tennis Club in Los Gatos, and ended his teaching career at the Rogue Valley Country Club in Medford, Oregon.

While playing on the Professional Tennis Tour from 1935 until 1946, Skeen played and defeated these top world-class players: Bill Tilden, Don Budge, Ellsworth Vines, Fred Perry, Bobby Riggs, Karel Kozeluh, Vinnie Richards, Frank Kovacs, Welby Van Horn, Bruce Barnes, Wayne Sabin, and Lester Stoefen.

Skeen also was a tennis teacher to many Hollywood movie stars, including Errol Flynn, Bing Crosby, Gary Cooper, Cary Grant, Fred Astaire, Kirk Douglas, Ginger Rogers, Doris Day, Joseph Cotten, Merle Oberon, Johnny Weissmuller, Norma Shearer, Hugh O'Brian, Dolores del Río, Robert Stack, Efrem Zimbalist, Jr. and Cornel Wilde.

== Sources ==
- Jack Kramer, The Game, My 40 Years in Tennis (1979)
- Bill Tilden, How to Play Better Tennis (1950)
- Dick Skeen, Tennis Players are Made, not Born (1976)
- Los Angeles Tennis Club
- Rivera Country Club
- Balboa Bay Club
- Newport Beach Tennis Club
- Blossom Hill Tennis Club
- Rogue Valley Country Club
