= Joe Whalen =

American tennis player (1916–1992)

- Full name: Joseph Patrick Whalen
- Country (sports): United States
- Born: 14 January 1916; Millinocket, Maine, United States
- Died: November 9, 1992 (aged 76); Jacksonville, Florida, United States

Singles
- US Pro: W (1936)

Joe Whalen (1916–1992) was an American tennis player in the 1930s who won a number of championships; he was originally from Millinocket, Maine, but grew up in Miami, Florida.

== Career ==
His most significant championship win was the 1936 United States Pro Championship. He beat Charles Wood in the final.

During World War II he served in the U.S. Army and was awarded the Purple Heart. Afterwards, he promoted professional tennis, and served as a teaching pro at a number of clubs. He founded and ran a tennis court construction company in Jacksonville, Florida until his retirement.

== See also ==
- Professional Tennis Championships
