= Palm Beach Professional Championship =

Defunct tennis tournament
- Tour: Pro Tennis Tour (1928, 1936-1939)
- Founded: 1927; 99 years ago
- Abolished: 1939; 87 years ago
- Location: West Palm Beach, Florida
- Venue: Palm Beach Tennis Club; Breakers Tennis Club
- Surface: Clay / outdoor

The Palm Beach Professional Championship also known as the Palm Beach Pro Championship was a men's international professional tennis tournament founded in 1927. It was first played in West Palm Beach, Florida, United States, until 1939 when it was discontinued.

== History ==
In March 1927 a Palm Beach Professional Tournament was first held at the Palm Beach Tennis Club, that event was won by Paul Heston, this was the first pro event held in the United States. In 1928 that tournament was replaced by the Southern Professional Championships tournament. In 1936 a Palm Beach Professional Championship men's tennis tournament was re-established, and was played on outdoor clay courts at Breakers Tennis Club, West Palm Beach, Florida, United States, this tournament replaced the Southern Pro Championships, which had been held in West Palm Beach from 1928 to 1935. However that tournament was revived in 1940. In 1939 this tournament was discontinued.

== Finals ==
=== Men's singles ===
(Incomplete roll)

Year	Champions	Runners-up	Score
1927	(United States) Paul Heston	(United States) George Agutter	6–2, 6–1, 6–1.
1936	(United States) James Pressly Sr.	(United States) George Agutter	6–4, 6–3, 6–2.
1937	(United States) James Pressly Sr.	(United States) George Agutter	7–5, 6–4, 6–1.
1939	(United States) Charles Wood	(United States) Lester Stoefen	6–3, 2–6, 8–6, 6–4.
