= Harold Blauer =

American tennis player (1910–1953)

- Born: 1910
- Died: January 8, 1953 (aged 42); New York City, New York
- Occupation: Tennis player

Harold Blauer (1910 – January 8, 1953) was an American professional tennis player who died as a result of injections of 450 mg 3,4-methylenedioxyamphetamine (code-named EA-1298) as part of Project Artichoke, a covert CIA mind-control and chemical interrogation research program run by the Office of Scientific Intelligence.

== Tennis career ==
Blauer reached the round of 16 in the 1935 United States Professional Tennis Tournament losing 3–6, 3–6, 3–6 to tennis legend (and eventual tournament champion) Bill Tilden.

== Death ==
Blauer checked into the New York State Psychiatric Institute (NYSPI) in late 1952, seeking help for depression following a divorce. While at the facility, he was used as a test subject in experiments conducted by the Army Chemical Corps. The Army had a classified agreement with the psychiatric institute that allowed them to study possible chemical warfare compounds by administering the substances to patients. In turn, the newly created Central Intelligence Agency had a relationship with the Army's Chemical Corps.

Between November 1952 and January 1953, Blauer was given injections of various chemical analogues of mescaline. He was first given relatively low doses of MDA (3,4-methylenedioxyamphetamine), then DMA (3,4‐dimethoxyamphetamine), MDPEA (3,4‐methylenedioxyphenethylamine) and DMA once again. Blauer requested to withdraw from these treatments because he got strong hallucinations from the injections. Despite this, on December 30, 1952, at 9:53 a.m., he was injected with a fatal dose of 450 milligrams (mg) of MDA. The injection caused sweating, tremors, flailing, and frothing at the mouth; after going into a coma, Blauer was pronounced dead at 12:15pm. NYSPI has claimed that the overdose was accidental since the safe doses for these mescaline analogues were based only on a guess.

Following Blauer's death, animal tests were performed in 1953 to find out the LD_{50} values for the mescaline analogues (MDMA and many other compounds) before some of them were tested on people. "If you look at the timing of when that research seems to be done, they were like, 'Oh crap, we just killed someone. We need to quickly do some animal toxicology studies'," observed neuroscientist Matthew Baggott. This was done, on behalf of the Army Chemical Warfare Corps, in secrecy at the University of Michigan. Dr Maurice H. Seevers, Director of the Department of Pharmacology at Michigan University in Ann Arbor, supervised these tests.

On the same day as Blauer, another NYSPI patient was injected with MDA. She was given 150 mg instead of the planned 450 mg dose of MDA, because her reaction to MDA was "so violent that the injection was stopped when it was only one-third complete."

The extent of Blauer's knowledge of the experiment is unclear, and after his death the experiment was covered up by the state of New York, the U.S. government, and the CIA for 22 years. In 1987, a United States District Court judge awarded Blauer's estate over $700,000 in a ruling that described Blauer as a "guinea pig" whose medical records had been altered to disguise the actual cause of death.

== See also ==
- James Forrestal
- Laurence Duggan
