= James Pressly Sr. =

American tennis player

- Full name: James Grier Pressly
- Country (sports): United States
- Born: 7 September 1907 Due West, South Carolina, United States
- Died: 26 March 2002 (age 95) Palm Beach, Florida, United States
- Turned pro: 1930
- Retired: 1941

Singles
- Career record: 20–5
- Career titles: 2

Other tournaments
- US Pro: 4R (1935)

James Grier Pressly Sr. (7 September 1907 – 26 March 2002) was an American professional tennis player and then coach during the pre open era of tennis. He served as the fourth president of the USPTA. He competed in the 1935 U.S. Pro Tennis Championships. He was active from 1930 to 1941 and won 2 career professional titles.

== Career ==
James Pressly Sr. was born Due West, South Carolina, United States on 7 September 1907. He became a professional tennis coach and player in 1930.

In 1935 he competed in the U.S. Pro Tennis Championships where he reached the fourth round, but lost to Lester Stoefen. In 1936 he won the Palm Beach Professional Championship against George Agutter. In 1937 he successfully defended that title against the same opponent.

In 1940 he was appointed the fourth president of the Professional Lawn Tennis Association from 1940 to 1941. He served during World War II as a Captain with the United States Army. Following the second world war he worked as a club pro for Jupiter Island Club in Florida and Bedford Golf and Tennis Club in New York for more than 30 years.

== Family ==
He married Anna Finn the daughter of James and Kathleen Mary Finn in 1946 and they had five children.
