= Walter Senior =

American tennis player

- Full name: Walter Senior
- Country (sports): USA
- Born: 1910
- Died
- Turned pro: 1938
- Retired: 1947

Singles
- Career titles: 7

Grand Slam singles results
- US Open: 2R (1936)
- Professional majors
- US Pro: QF (1938, 1940, 1945)

Walter Senior (1910 – Unknown) was an American tennis player in the 1930s and 1940s.

== Career ==
Senior won the 1936 California State championships over a young Joe Hunt, displaying "swift, steady, well-planned tennis". Senior's best year on the circuit was 1937. He won several tournaments including the Western States title, four state championships and the Canadian championships. Senior won the Wisconsin State title beating Elwood Cooke in the final. He won the Illinois state title over former US champion Wilmer Allison in three straight sets for the loss of just three games. Allison had an injured nerve in his right arm throughout the tournament, but Senior "was at the top of his game and forced Allison into numerous errors". The match lasted 45 minutes. Senior won the Michigan State title beating George Toley in the final in four sets; his forehand drives gave him control of the match. Senior won the Canadian championships in five sets against Bobby Murray. Senior "varied his long-hitting game with drop shots and clever cuts and at one stage of the last set he took 15 straight points". In the Idaho state final, he beat Fred Dixon in straight sets. "He drove his shoulder-high forehand with blazing speed, backhanded placements down the sidelines and showed nice judgment of lobs. It was his drop shot that finally did the business, however". Senior turned professional at the end of the year. Senior was a quarter finalist at the US Pro in 1938, 1940 and 1945.
