= Emmett Paré =

American tennis player (1907–1973)

- Full name: Joseph Emmett Paré
- Country (sports): United States
- Born: January 24, 1907 Chicago, Illinois USA
- Died: October 8, 1973 (aged 66) New Orleans, Louisiana USA

Grand Slam singles results
- US Open: 2R (1924, 1930)

Other tournaments
- Professional majors
- US Pro: QF (1932, 1934)

J. Emmett Paré (January 24, 1907 – October 1973), was an American tennis player in the early part of the 20th century and the tennis coach at Tulane University who played his college tennis at Georgetown University, and was one of the early stars of professional tennis.

Paré was a captain on the Georgetown University tennis team, and in 1928 he reached the doubles final in the NCAA Championships. He graduated from Georgetown in 1929.

He was 19–3 in four singles appearances at the Cincinnati Open, winning the 1928 singles title and reaching the singles final in 1930. His three singles losses were against George Lott in the 1927 final, Herbert Bowman in a 1929 semifinal, and Frank Shields in the 1930 final.

He won the Western Tennis Championships in 1928, and won the Western Indoor Championships title and the Michigan State title in 1927. In 1929, he won the U.S. National Clay Court Championship singles title after a five-set victory in the final against J. Gilbert Hall.

Pare became a touring professional (making him ineligible to play the top amateur events) and traveled with Bill Tilden in his first barnstorming tour in 1931. By 1933, Paré became the head pro at the New Orleans Tennis Club, the same year he began as tennis coach at Tulane University. In 1934 he won the doubles title at the U. S. Pro Tennis Championships with Bruce Barnes.

From 1934 to 1973, he was the head tennis coach at Tulane University. For 40 years, until his retirement in 1973, Paré's Green Wave squads were a national powerhouse and won 20 Southeastern Conference team titles. In 1959 his Green Wave team tied the University of Notre Dame for the NCAA team title. Six of his Tulane players won NCAA singles championships.

From 1938 until Tulane left the SEC in 1966, the Green Wave won 18 conference championships, including nine straight from 1951 until 1959. That year was also monumental in another respect for Tulane, as Paré's squad captured the school's only team national championship, winning the 1959 NCAA title. That championship followed NCAA runner-up appearances in 1949 and 1957.

Tulane boasts eight individual NCAA singles champions and two NCAA doubles winners. Clifford Sutter won Tulane's first national championship, claiming the NCAA singles title in both 1930 and 1932. Following Paré's arrival in 1933, the Green Wave added another six singles titles to its trophy case, including an impressive three straight in 1953,54, and 55. Ernest Sutter won back-to-back NCAA titles in 1936 and 1937, while Jack Tuero claimed the 1949 singles crown. Ham Richardson began a three-year run of Tulane singles championships in 1953, repeating as champion again in 1954. In 1955, Jose Aguero claimed the NCAA singles title, Tulane's eighth in a span of 25 years. However, the winning continued into the late 1950s, as Crawford Henry and Ron Holmberg teamed to give Tulane the NCAA doubles champions in 1957 and 1959.

Richardson and Aguero led perhaps the strongest of Tulane tennis teams from 1952 through 1955. Richardson led the squad from the No. 1 position, while Aguero was perhaps the nation's most formidable No. 2 singles player after joining the team in 1954. Richardson nearly added a third singles championship in 1955, but the NCAA ruled him ineligible due to his participation on the Tulane varsity as a freshman, pushing Aguero center stage, where the Brazilian won the singles championship in his own right that season.

The 1957 Green Wave squad may have matched the 1954-55 Richardson-Aguero squads in overall strength. The team had an incredible 1-2-3 punch with Aguero as a senior and super sophomores Holmberg and Henry at the No. 2 and 3 positions, respectively. The 1957 team earned the Greenies their second NCAA runner-up honor to the University of Michigan, although the Henry-Holmberg duo captured Tulane's first NCAA doubles title that season.

Henry and Holmberg also led a strong 1959 squad, as Tulane won the first NCAA Championship in school history. The duo again captured the NCAA doubles crown that season, giving Tulane its eighth individual national championship under Paré.

Paré's teams dominated not just the national tennis scene, but also the Southeastern Conference as well. In 1939, the Green Wave won the first of 18 SEC titles, claiming back-to-back championships again in 1941 and 1942. After Georgia Tech won the first post-war SEC championship in 1946, Tulane reasserted itself in 1947, winning three straight which would begin a run of 15 league titles in an 18-year span. Florida briefly halted the rolling Wave by capturing the 1950 SEC crown, but Tulane responded by winning nine straight titles from 1951 through 1959. Georgia Tech and Florida won the SEC in 1960 and 1961, respectively, but the Greenies closed out their stay in the SEC with titles in 1962,63, and 64.

Tulane's 1950?s squads not only won the SEC nine out of 10 seasons, but made a habit of claiming a majority of the nine championship matches each season at the league tournament. In 1953, Green Wave players won all six singles titles and all three doubles matches. A year later, Tulane claimed the No. 1, No. 2 and No. 5 singles matches and all three doubles positions. In 1955, Tulane claimed five singles titles (all but No. 6) and again swept the three doubles spots. The great 1957 squad won five singles championships and two of the three doubles matches.

He was enshrined in the Athletic Hall of Fame at both Tulane University and Georgetown University and in the Sugar Bowl Hall of Fame.

Paré died on October 8, 1973, at Hôtel Dieu Hospital in New Orleans after a lengthy illness. He was buried at Calvary Cemetery in Evanston, Illinois. He was a lifelong bachelor.
