= Fred Perry =

British tennis player (1909–1995)

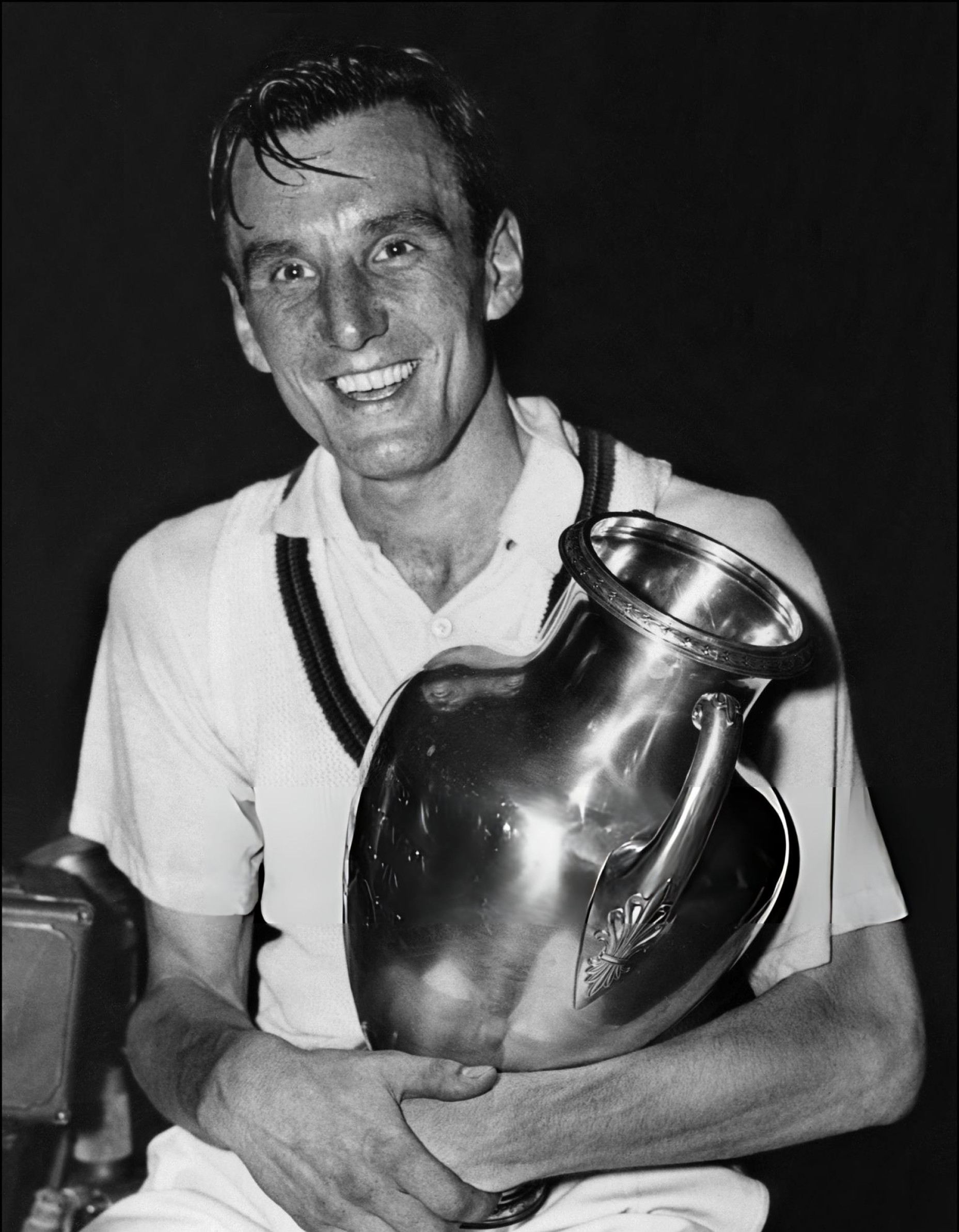
- Full name: Frederick Towersey Perry
- Country (sports): (United Kingdom) Great Britain
- Born: 18 May 1909 Portwood, Stockport, England
- Died: 2 February 1995 (aged 85) Melbourne, Victoria, Australia
- Height: 6 ft (183 cm)
- Turned pro: 1923 (amateur from 1929)
- Retired: 1959
- Plays: Right-handed (one-handed backhand)
- Int. Tennis HoF: 1975 (member page)

Singles
- Career record: 695–281
- Career titles: 62
- Highest ranking: No. 1 (1934, A. Wallis Myers)

Grand Slam singles results
- Australian Open: W (1934)
- French Open: W (1935)
- Wimbledon: W (1934, 1935, 1936)
- US Open: W (1933, 1934, 1936)

Other tournaments
- Professional majors
- US Pro: W (1938, 1941)
- Wembley Pro: QF (1951, 1952)

Grand Slam doubles results
- Australian Open: W (1934)
- French Open: W (1933)
- Wimbledon: F (1932)

Grand Slam mixed doubles results
- French Open: W (1932)
- Wimbledon: W (1935, 1936)
- US Open: W (1932)

Team competitions
- Davis Cup: W (1933, 1934, 1935, 1936)

Frederick Towersey Perry (18 May 1909 – 2 February 1995) was a British tennis and table tennis player and former world No. 1. He won 10 Majors, including eight Grand Slam tournaments and two Pro Slams single titles, as well as six Major doubles titles. Perry was the first player to win a "Career Grand Slam", lifting all four singles titles, which he completed at the age of 26 at the 1935 French Championships. He remains the only British player to achieve this feat.

He won three consecutive Wimbledon Championships from 1934 to 1936 and was world amateur No. 1 player during those three years. Prior to Andy Murray in 2013, Perry was the last British player to win the men's Wimbledon championship and the last British player to win a men's singles Grand Slam title until Andy Murray won the 2012 US Open.

Perry's first love was table tennis and he was World Champion in 1929. He began playing tennis aged 14 and his tennis career at 21, when in 1930 an LTA committee chose him to join a four-man team to tour the United States. In 1933, Perry helped lead the Great Britain team to victory over France in the Davis Cup; the team's first success since 1912, followed by wins over the United States in 1934, 1935, and a fourth consecutive title with victory over Australia in 1936. However, due to his disillusionment with the class-conscious nature of the Lawn Tennis Club of Great Britain, the working-class Perry turned professional at the end of the 1936 season and moved to the United States where he became a naturalised U.S. citizen in 1939. In 1942, he was drafted into the US Army Air Force during the Second World War. After retirement, he founded the clothing label Fred Perry in London in 1952. He also had a career in broadcasting, working as a tennis summariser and reporter for BBC Radio from 1959 to 1994.

Despite his unprecedented contribution to British tennis, Perry was not accorded full recognition by tennis authorities until later in life, because between 1927 and 1967 the International Lawn Tennis Federation ignored amateur champions who later turned professional. In 1984, a statue of Perry was unveiled at Wimbledon, and in the same year he became the only tennis player listed in a survey of 2,000 Britons to find the "Best of the Best" British sportsmen of the 20th century.

== Early life ==
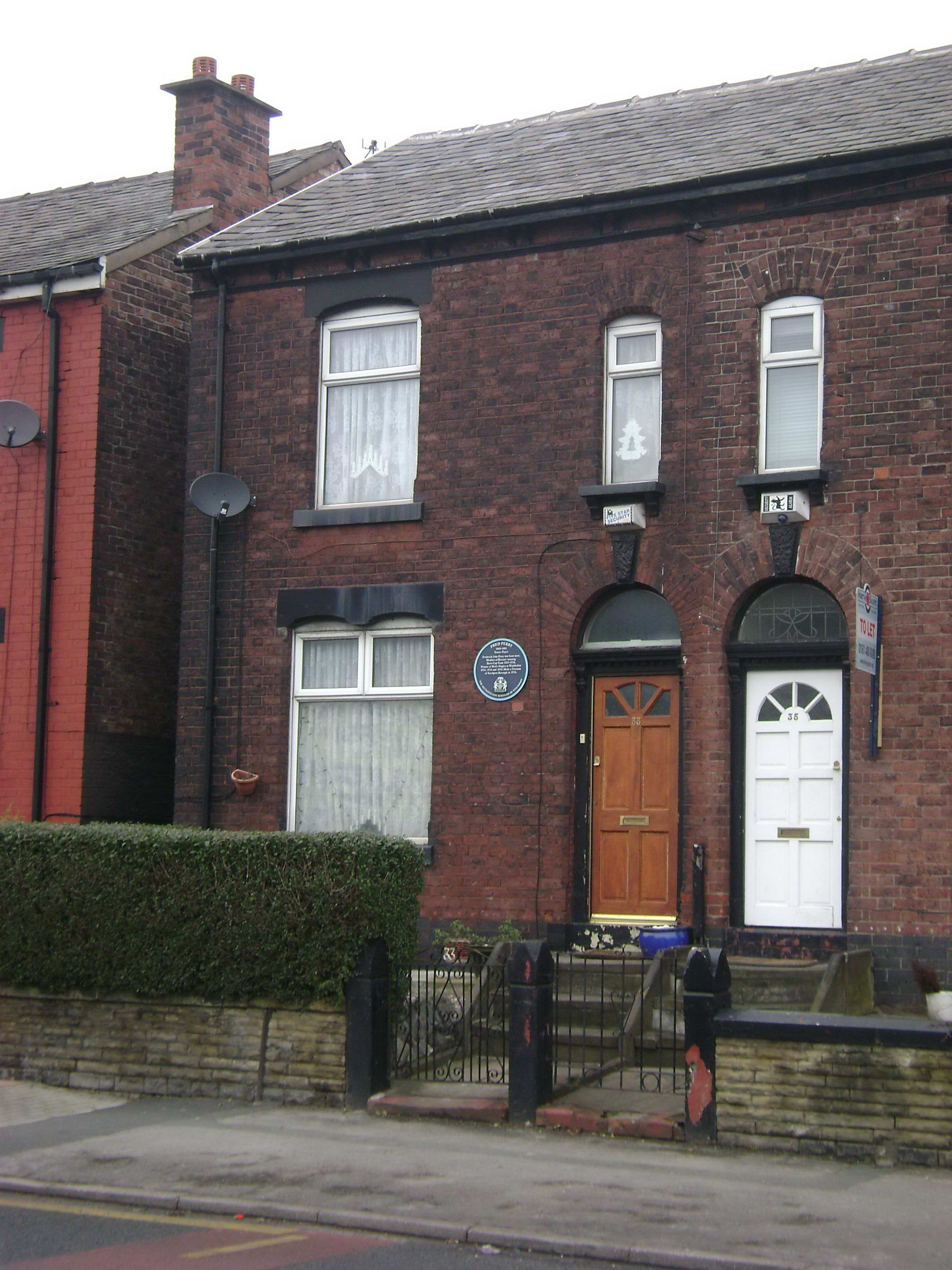
The house where Fred Perry was born, 33 Carrington Road, Stockport

Perry was born in 1909 in Stockport, where his father, Samuel Perry (1877–1954), was a cotton spinner. For the first decade of his life, he also lived in Bolton, Lancashire, and Wallasey, Cheshire, because his father was involved in local politics. When living in Wallasey he attended Liscard Primary School and, briefly, Wallasey Grammar School. Perry moved to Brentham Garden Suburb in Ealing, west London aged eleven years when his father became the national secretary of the Co-operative Party after World War I. His father became the Labour and Co-operative Party Member of Parliament (MP) for Kettering in 1929.

Perry first began to play tennis on the public courts near his family's housing estate. He was educated at Ealing Grammar School for Boys.

Fred Perry
Personal information
- Nationality: England

Sport
- Sport: Table tennis
Medal record
Men's table tennis
Representing England
World Championships
Gold medal – first place	1929 Budapest	Singles
Bronze medal – third place	1929 Budapest	Doubles
Bronze medal – third place	1929 Budapest	Team
Silver medal – second place	1928 Stockholm	Doubles
Bronze medal – third place	1928 Stockholm	Mixed Doubles
Bronze medal – third place	1928 Stockholm	Team

== Table tennis career ==
"Perry took advantage of his athletic build and extraordinary physical capacity: he was highly mobile and fast, had a sound defence and placed his balls very well. Thanks to his very strong wrist he could hit a very hard forehand drive". Perry reached the quarter-finals of the men's singles in the 1928 Stockholm World championships, where he lost to Laszlo Bellak. He was runner-up in the men's doubles with Charlie Bull. In 1929 Perry lost to Bull in the Czechoslovak Open and lost to Anton Malacek in the English Open. At the Budapest World championships men's singles event, Perry beat Miklós Szabados 3 games to 1 to win the title. He beat Szabados again in an exhibition in Paris. His final table tennis appearance was in 1932, in a team match in London against Hungary.

== Amateur tennis career ==
During his amateur playing career Perry trained with Arsenal football club to focus on his fitness.

=== 1927–30 ===
Perry was an eighteen year old table tennis prodigy when he began his tennis career. He reached several quarter finals of tennis events in the London area at Herga club in Harrow, Blackheath, Fulham and Ealing. He also reached the semi-finals at New Malden. Perry reached the semi-finals at the Herga club tournament in Harrow in July. He also reached the semi-finals of the Sidmouth tournament in September.

In 1929, a year when Perry won the World Table tennis championships, he continued his tennis career. He won the New Malden championships in August beating Wilfred Freeman in the final. He also won Queen's Evening Tournament in December in Queen's Club, London, beating Horace Lester in the final. Perry won the Middlesex championships in May beating Madan Mohan in the final and the same month won the Harrogate championships beating John Olliff in the final. In November, Perry beat Eric Peters in the final of the Argentine championships in Buenos Aires.

=== 1931 ===
In April, Perry beat Ryuki Miki in the final of the Paddington championships in London. In August, Perry won the Eastern grasscourt championships in Rye, New York beating Cliff Sutter in the semis and J. Gilbert Hall in the final. In November, Perry beat Olliff in the final of the Cromer covered court autumn championships.

=== 1932 ===
In January, Perry won the Coupe de Noel in Paris beating Marcel Bernard and Jean Borotra. The following week, Perry beat Bernard in the final of the Flanders club event in Roubaix. In February, Perry beat Pat Hughes in the final of the Kingston championships in Jamaica. Then Perry beat Harry Lee in the final of the Bermuda championships. Soon after returning to the UK in March, Perry beat Lee in the final of the Tally-Ho! Open Tennis Championships in Birmingham. In April, Perry came from two sets down to beat George Lyttleton Rogers in the final of the British Hard Court Championships in Bournemouth. In May, Perry beat William Powell in the final of Harrogate championships. In July, Perry won the Herga Club tournament beating Takeo Kuwabara in the final. In September at the Pacific Southwest championships, Perry was 5–2 down in the final set and saved three match points before winning an epic quarter final 12–10 in the final set against Keith Gledhill. He went on to beat Satoh to take the title. Perry won the Pacific coast championships in October beating Bunny Austin in the final.

=== 1933 ===
In May, Perry won the British hard court championships in Bournemouth over Adrian Quist, Lee and Austin in the final three rounds. Perry denied Crawford the calendar Grand Slam and won his first Grand Slam title at the U.S. Championships. Crawford had a bad knee and "the Australian had to play a limping game at times on any quick starts or hard gets. In spite of this the tennis Fred Perry played deserved the title. He had the heart and used his head. His forcing strokes kept Crawford worried all afternoon. At any rate, leading two sets to one, Crawford had nothing left for the last two sets" according to The Hartford Courant. In September, Perry won the Pacific Southwest championships beating Satoh in four sets in the final. In November, whilst touring Australia, Perry played in the Victorian championships in Melbourne and beat Harry Hopman and Jack Crawford to take the title.

=== 1934 ===
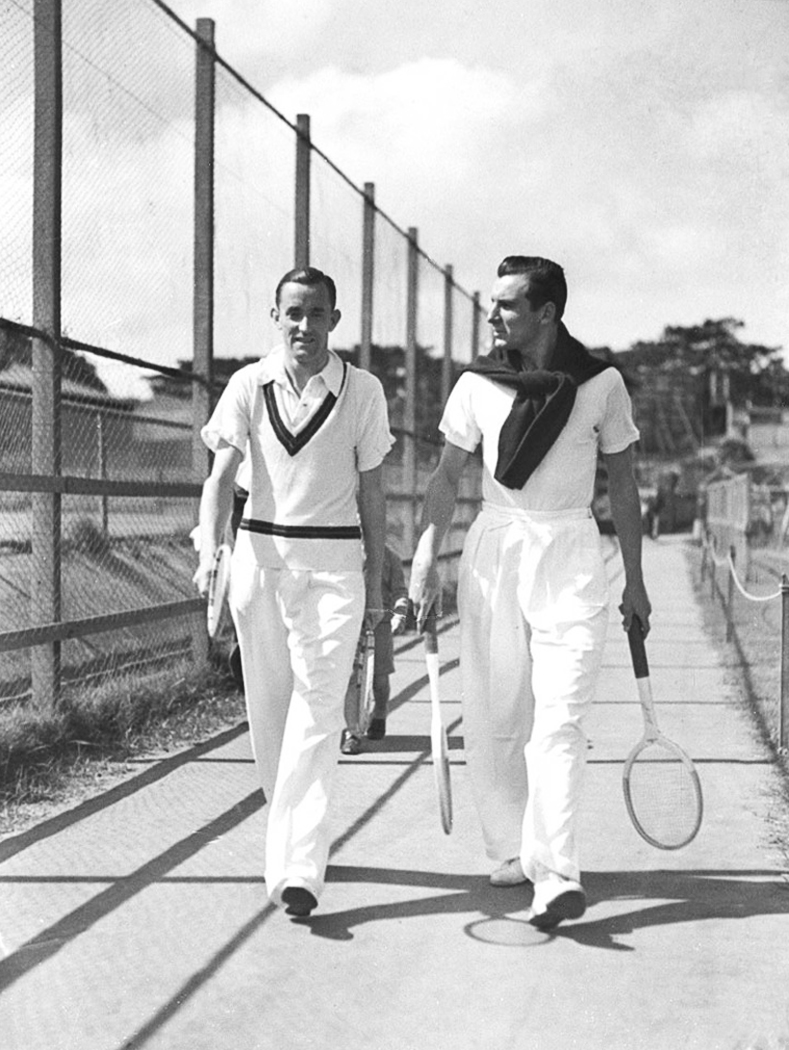
Fred Perry (right) with Pat Hughes at White City in Sydney, Australia, in 1934

Perry beat Crawford in the final of the Australian championships in January and the British Hard Court Championships in Bournemouth in May. Perry won his first Wimbledon title beating defending champion Crawford in the final. Perry's success attracted the adoration of the crowds at Wimbledon particularly as he contrasted sharply with the privileged background of most patrons and players associated with the All England Club at the time. The upper echelons of the British tennis establishment greeted his success more coolly, regarding him as an "upstart". After winning his maiden Wimbledon title, Perry recalled overhearing a Wimbledon committee member remark that "the best man didn't win." His All-England Club member's tie, awarded to all winners of the Championships, was left for him on a chair in his dressing room.

Perry faced Wilmer Allison in the final of the U.S. Championships and when Perry led 5–2 in the fifth set "the crowd sighed in unison and looked toward the exits, but the Texan still wasn't through. He ripped to the net after his service balls to win one at love, and then he broke through Perry in the ninth. Allison held his own service in the 10th game and the count was five-all". However, Perry took the set and match 8–6. Perry beat Stoefen in the final of the Pacific Southwest championships in September. Perry beat Don Budge in five sets in the final of the Pacific Coast championships in October. Perry won "without going to the net more than a half dozen times in 50 games and when it was all over Budge had scored more points than his adversary, made fewer errors and many more placements". Perry was ranked World No. 1 amateur by A. Wallis Myers, Pierre Gillou, Bernard Brown, John R. Tunis, Bill Tilden, Ned Potter, G.H. McElhone (The Sydney Morning Herald), Harry Hopman, R.O. Cummings (The Courier Mail), and J. Brookes Fenno, Jr. (The Literary Digest)

=== 1935 ===
Perry beat Abel Kay in the final of the New Zealand championships in January. Perry beat Austin in five sets in the final of the British Hard Court Championships in May. Perry won the French championships in June to become the first man to win all four Grand Slam singles titles. In the final he beat Gottfried von Cramm in four sets. "The two hours final was conducted in perfect composure. It was essentially a sporting match, exhibiting beautiful tennis but lacking drama, because, after the second set. it was obvious that von Cramm could not pierce Perry's armour" according to a newspaper article. Perry beat Hermann Artens in the final of the Belgian championships in Brussels in June. Perry retained his Wimbledon title beating von Cramm in the final. "The German didn't like Perry's speed today. Nor did he care for the Englishman's eternal hustle which forced him to hurry his shots. Perry stayed close to the baseline save in the second set, for he saw that he could triumph without going to the net, thus exposing his wings to the German's favorite shot a razor-like drive down the sidelines." Perry was ranked World No. 1 amateur by A. Wallis Myers, S. Wallis Merrihew, Pierre Gillou, Harry Hopman, Ned Potter, G. H. McElhone, The Times and "Forehand" (Ashburton Guardian).

=== 1936 ===
Perry beat Max Ellmer in the final of two Cannes championship titles (the Beau site event in March and the Cannes handicap tournament in April). Perry beat Ladislav Hecht in the final of the Czech championships in Prague in April. Perry beat Austin in straight sets in the final of the British Hard Court Championships in Bournemouth in May to win his fifth consecutive British hardcourt title. His final Wimbledon victory was a straight sets defeat of the German Baron Gottfried von Cramm which lasted less than 45 minutes and in which Perry only lost two games. It became the quickest final in the 20th century and the second shortest of all time. Perry had learned from the Wimbledon masseur that von Cramm had suffered a groin strain which limited his ability to move wide on the forehand. Perry faced Budge in the final of the U.S. Championships. At 5-4 and 8–7 in the fifth set, Budge came within two points of victory at Deuce on Perry's serve. "Verging on victory, the pressure weighed heavily on the slightly built, elongated American, while Perry, an experienced campaigner, remained cool", according to Chicago Tribune. Perry won the fifth set 10-8 and with it his eighth and last Grand Slam singles title.

In the Davis Cup, Perry led the Great Britain team to four consecutive victories from 1933 to 1936, with wins over France in 1933, the United States in 1934 and 1935, and Australia in 1936. Perry competed in a total of 20 Davis Cup matches, winning 34 of his 38 rubbers in singles, and 11 out of 14 in doubles.

Perry was ranked World No. 1 amateur by A. Wallis Myers, Pierre Gillou, Ned Potter, The Times, Harry Hopman, "Austral" (R.M. Kidston), G.H. McElhone, Mervyn Weston (The Australasian) and Bill Tilden.

== Professional tennis career ==
=== 1937 ===
After three years as the world No. 1 tennis amateur player, Perry turned professional in late 1936. This led to his being virtually ostracised by the British tennis establishment. He made his professional debut on 6 January 1937 at the Madison Square Garden against the best professional player, Ellsworth Vines, winning in four sets. For the next two years he played lengthy tours against Vines. In 1937, they played 61 matches in the United States on their big tour, with Vines winning 32 and Perry 29. They then sailed to Britain, where they played a brief tour in UK and Ireland. Perry won the King George VI Coronation Cup over Vines. Perry won six matches out of nine in UK and Ireland, so Vines and Perry finished the year tied at 35 victories each. Ray Bowers ranked Perry and Vines joint no. 1 pros for 1937.

=== 1938 ===
The following year, 1938, the big tour was even longer, and this time Vines beat Perry 49 matches to 35, while a short tour of the Caribbean and Central and South America ended at four victories a piece. Perry won the U.S. Pro at Chicago beating Bruce Barnes in the final.

=== 1939 ===
Don Budge won the Grand Slam in 1938 as an amateur and then turned professional and played a series of matches against both Vines and Perry in 1939, beating Vines 22 times to 17, and beating Perry by 28 victories to 8. In October, Perry lost in the final of U.S. Pro to Vines in four sets. Then Perry won a four-man round robin at Long Beach (he, Gorchakoff and Stoefen finished level on 2 wins each). He also won a four-man round robin in San Diego in November (where he and Stoefen finished on two wins each). In December he won four man round robins at Phoenix and Pasadena.

=== 1940 ===
Perry won the Finnish relief event in New York in March, beating Vines and Budge. Perry won West Coast Pro round robin in Los Angeles in April. This was the last time Perry and Vines played each other before Vines embarked full time on a golf career. Perry won their final match. Perry lost in the final of the U.S. Pro in Chicago to Budge.

=== 1941 ===
In April Perry won tournaments at Pinehurst (over Dick Skeen) and White Sulphur Springs (over Skeen). Perry beat Skeen again in the final of the U.S. Pro at Chicago in June and also in June, Perry won a four-man round robin at Forest Hills over Budge, Skeen and Tilden and won an event at Rye (beating Skeen in the final). In August Perry won a four-man round robin at St. Louis. Perry was ranked World No. 1 pro by Ray Bowers.

=== 1942–1945 ===
After breaking his elbow in a match against Bobby Riggs on the opening night of the Round robin World Series, Perry had to miss several matches of the tour. Perry finished fourth in the standings. Soon after the pro circuit petered out in mid-1942, Perry was involved in World War 2, where he served in the U.S. Air force, having already gained American citizenship in 1939.

=== 1946 ===
In 1946, Perry won events at Tucson in January (beating Bobby Riggs in the final), Omaha in February (beating Wayne Sabin in the final), Palm Springs in April (over Carl Earn) and El Paso in May (over Frank Kovacs). Perry also played a series of matches against Tilden.

=== 1947 ===
In June, Perry lost in the quarter-finals of the U.S. Pro to Van Horn. In August Perry won the White Mountains Pro at Jefferson beating Sabin in the final.

=== 1948 ===
Perry won the Slazenger Pro at Scarborough in July. In the final he won in four sets against Yvon Petra, who had won the Wimbledon men's singles two years earlier. "Perry, noted one observer, had lost none of his zest, sting—or shrewdness. Perry assessed Petra's game while losing the first set of the final and won the next three for the loss of seven games. 'I knew a little bit more about the game than he did', said Perry afterwards."

=== 1949 ===
Perry turned 40 in May. By now, Perry was playing on the pro circuit sporadically. Defending his title at Scarborough in July, Perry lost in the quarter-finals to Dinny Pails in five sets.

=== 1950–1959 ===
Perry won the Slazenger Pro at Scarborough in August 1950, beating Salem Khaled in the final. In August 1951, aged 42, Perry won his final title at Scarborough beating Francesco Romanoni. Perry won a tournament at Hagen in September 1953 beating fellow veteran Hans Nusslein in the final. He continued playing until he was 50 in 1959, when he lost in the first round of the U.S. Pro at Cleveland.

== Post-playing career ==
=== Broadcasting career ===
After retiring as a player, Fred Perry had a long career as a tennis broadcaster. He worked as a summariser and reporter for BBC Radio from 1959 to 1994 and for many years was a familiar voice during BBC radio's coverage of Wimbledon. He also commentated on TV on the BBC from 1951 to 1952 and ITV's coverage of Wimbledon from 1956 to 1968, after which ITV stopped broadcasting the championships. ITV "employed me as a would-be counter-attraction to my old friend Dan Maskell on BBC Television. We were simply not able to compete and I wasn't unhappy when ITV gave it up as a bad job. The BBC had two channels to ITV's one, and were not inhibited by commercial breaks every fifteen minutes and the imposition of a strict time limit on the coverage, as ITV was", explained Perry in his autobiography. In later years, Perry was sometimes interviewed by BBC Television during their Wimbledon coverage. In 1979 Perry spoke to Des Lynam at Wimbledon about his life in an episode of the TV series "Maestro". The programme was shown again as a tribute after his death.

=== Death ===
On 2 February 1995, Perry died at Epworth Hospital in Melbourne, Australia, after breaking his ribs following a fall in a hotel bathroom. He had been in Melbourne attending the Australian Open.

== Personal life ==
Perry was one of the leading bachelors of the 1930s and his off-court romances were reported in the world press. Perry had a romantic relationship with German and American actress and singer Marlene Dietrich and in 1934 he announced his engagement to English stage and film actress Mary Lawson, but the relationship fell apart after Perry moved to the US. In 1935 he married American film star Helen Vinson, but their marriage ended in divorce in 1940. In 1941 he was briefly married to model Sandra Breaux. Then, in 1945, he married Lorraine Walsh, but that marriage also ended quickly. Perry's final marriage to Barbara Riese (the sister of actress Patricia Roc) in 1952 lasted over forty years, until his death. They had two children, David and Penny. David led his father's clothing line prior to a buyout.

In July 1937, an England vs America pro-celebrity tennis doubles match was organised, featuring Perry and Charlie Chaplin playing against Groucho Marx and Ellsworth Vines, to open the new clubhouse at the Beverly Hills Tennis Club.

Perry had an older sister, Edith; they were both born in Stockport, Cheshire. Edith greatly supported her younger brother throughout his sporting achievements. Perry had a half sister, Sylvia. Outside of tennis, he was an avid follower of Bolton Wanderers F.C., owing to his childhood years living in the town.

== Clothing label ==
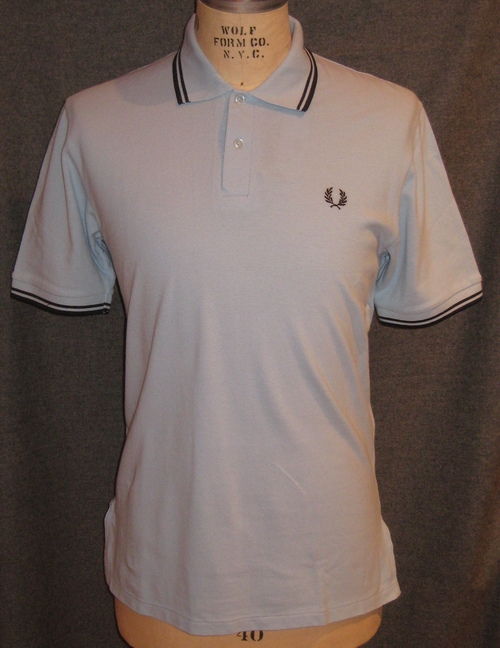
The classic Fred Perry design

In the late 1940s, Perry was approached by Tibby Wegner, an Austrian footballer who had invented an anti-perspirant device worn around the wrist. Perry made a few changes to Wegner's design to create the first sweatband. Wegner's next idea was to produce a sports shirt, which was to be made from white knitted cotton pique with short sleeves and a buttoned placket like René Lacoste's shirts. Launched at Wimbledon in 1952, the Fred Perry tennis shirt was an immediate success.

The Fred Perry logo is a laurel wreath, based on the original symbol for Wimbledon. The logo, which appears on the left breast of Fred Perry garments, is stitched into the fabric of the shirt. The brand was initially run by the Perry family, namely his son David, until it was bought by Japanese company Hit Union in 1995. However, the Perry family continued to work closely with the brand. Fred Perry was the clothing sponsor of British tennis player Andy Murray from the start of his career until 2009.

== Sporting legacy ==
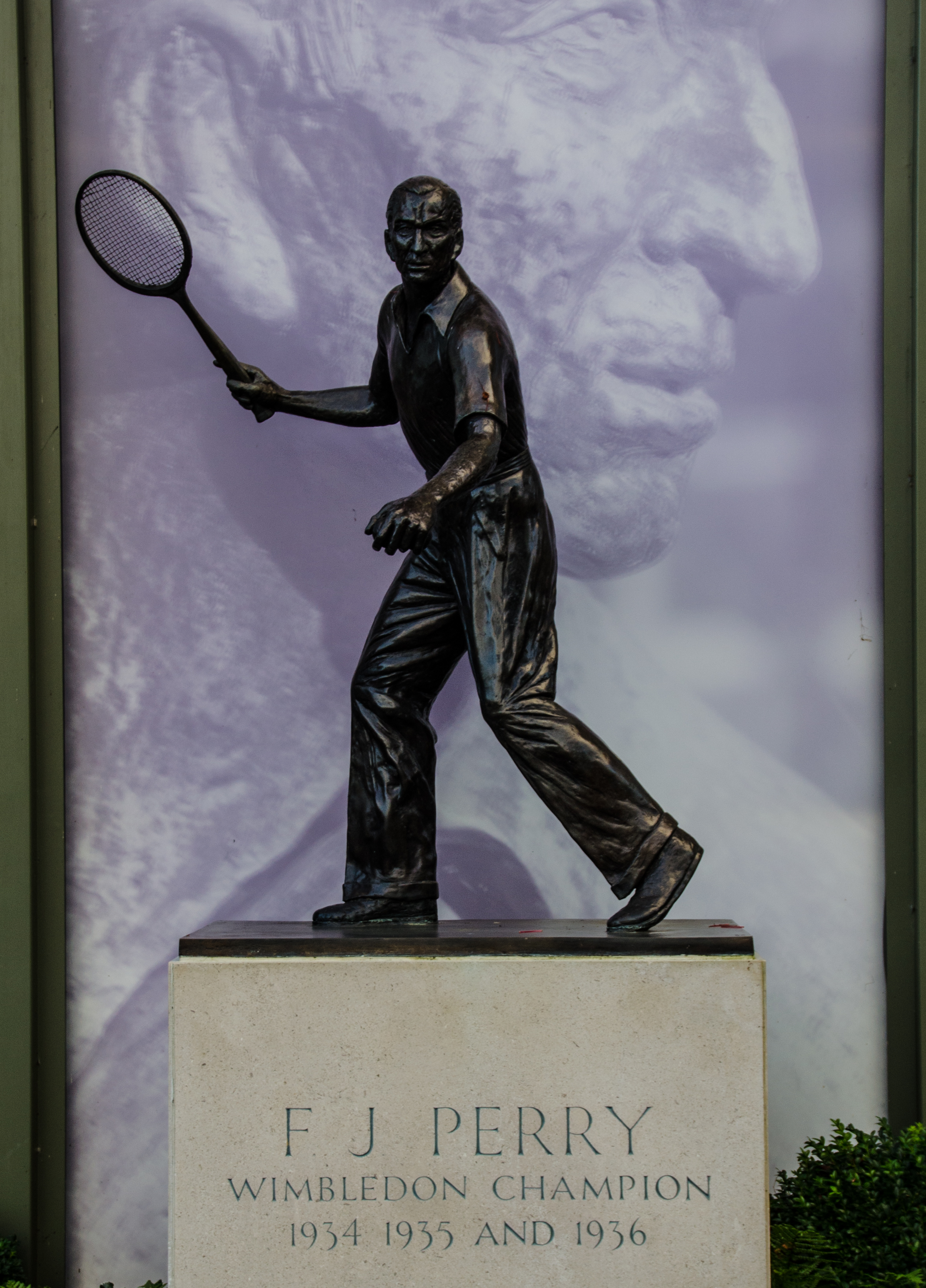
Statue of Fred Perry at the All England Lawn Tennis Club in Wimbledon

Perry is considered by some to have been one of the greatest players ever to have played the game. In his 1979 autobiography Jack Kramer, the long-time tennis promoter and great player himself, called Perry one of the six greatest players of all time. In 1975, Don Budge ranked his top five players of all time and rated Perry number three behind Vines and Kramer.

Kings of the Court, a video-tape documentary made in 1997 in conjunction with the International Tennis Hall of Fame, named Perry one of the ten greatest players of all time. But this documentary only considered those players who played before the Open era of tennis that began in 1968, with the exception of Rod Laver, who spanned both eras, so that all of the more recent great players are missing.

In 100 Greatest of All Time, a 2012 television series broadcast by the Tennis Channel, Perry was ranked the 15th-greatest male player, just behind Boris Becker at 14th, and just ahead of Stefan Edberg at 16th. Perry's great rivals Vines (37th) and Crawford (32nd) were ranked well below him.

Kramer, however, had several caveats about Perry. He said that Bill Tilden once called Perry "the world's worst good player". Kramer says that Perry was "extremely fast; he had a hard body with sharp reflexes, and he could hit a forehand with a snap, slamming it on the rise—and even on the fastest grass. That shot was nearly as good as Segura's two-handed forehand." His only real weakness, says Kramer, "was his backhand. Perry hit underslice off that wing about 90% of the time, and eventually at the very top levels—against Vines and Budge—that was what did him in. Whenever an opponent would make an especially good shot, Perry would cry out 'Very clevah.' I never played Fred competitively, but I heard enough from other guys that 'Very clevah' drove a lot of opponents crazy."

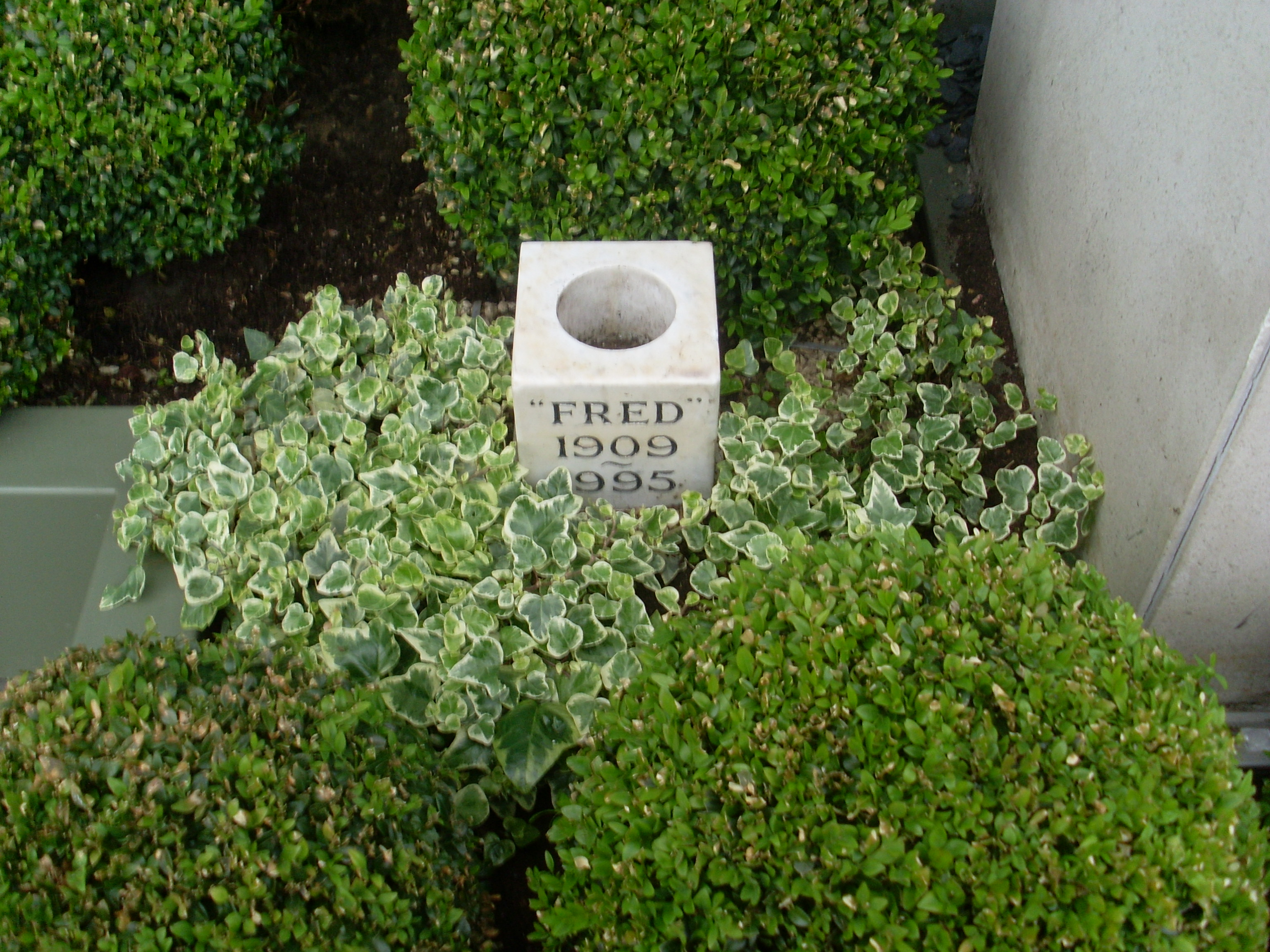
Perry's grave near his statue at the All England Lawn Tennis Club, Wimbledon

Perry, however, recalled his days on the professional tour differently. He maintained that "there was never any easing up in his tour matches with Ellsworth Vines and Bill Tilden since there was the title of World Pro Champion at stake." He said "I must have played Vines in something like 350 matches, yet there was never any fixing as most people thought. There were always people willing to believe that our pro matches weren't strictly on the level, that they were just exhibitions. But as far as we were concerned, we always gave everything we had."

Another comment from Kramer is that Perry unwittingly "screwed up men's tennis in England, although this wasn't his fault. The way he could hit a forehand—snap it off like a ping-pong shot—Perry was a physical freak. Nobody else could be taught to hit a shot that way. But the kids over there copied Perry's style, and it ruined them. Even after Perry faded out of the picture, the coaches there must have kept using him as a model."

== Honours and memorials ==
=== United Kingdom ===
Fred Perry Way sign in the Metropolitan Borough of Stockport

A bronze statue of Fred Perry was erected at the All England Lawn Tennis Club in Wimbledon, London, in 1984 to mark the 50th anniversary of his first singles championship. It is located at the Church Road gate. After Perry's accidental death in 1995, he was cremated and his ashes buried in an urn near the statue.

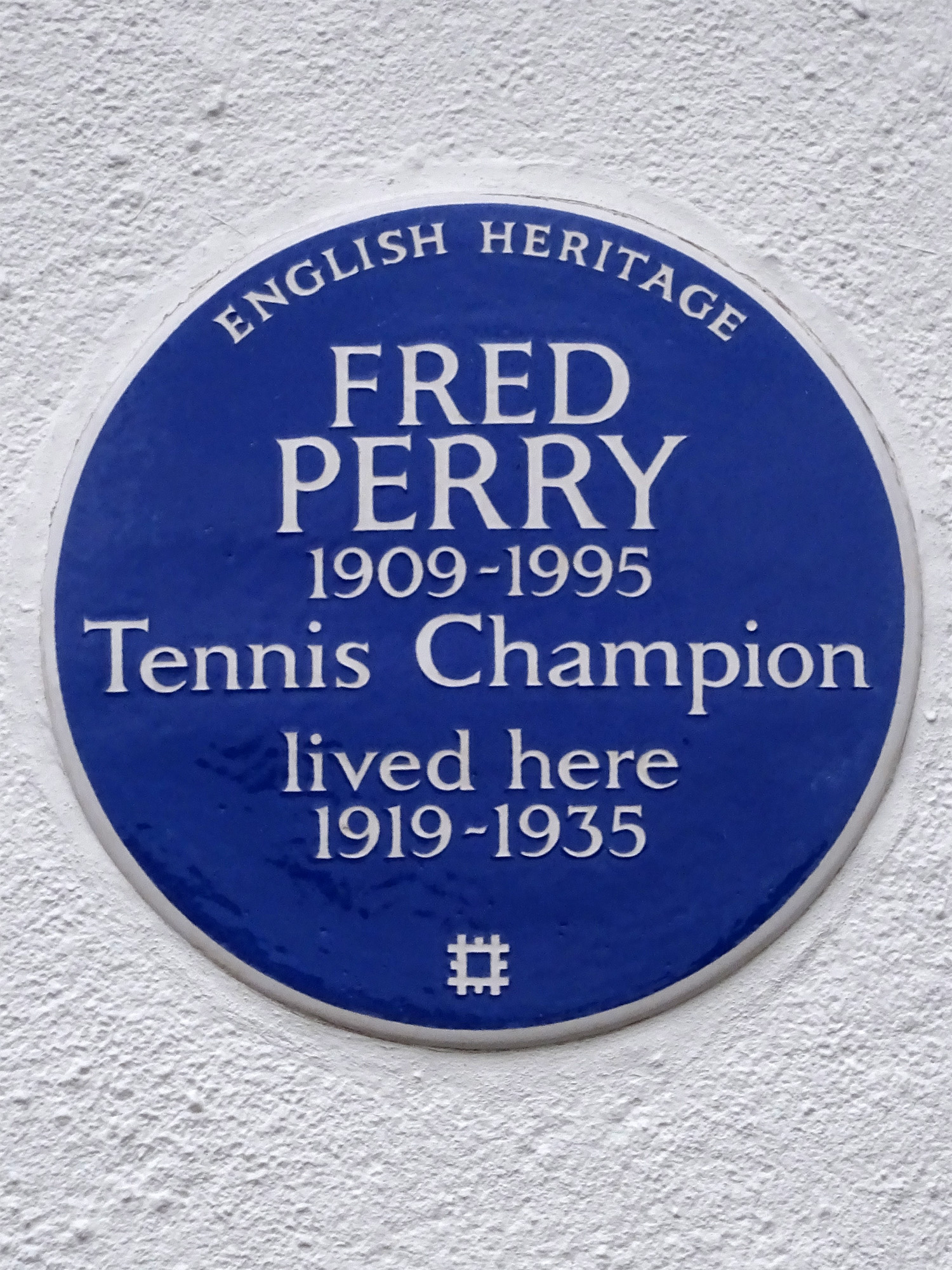
English Heritage blue plaque at 223 Pitshanger Lane, Ealing, London

Perry's home town of Stockport has numerous memorials to the former tennis champion. For instance there is a blue plaque commemorating the house where he was born. In September 2002, a designated walking route called the Fred Perry Way was opened through the Metropolitan Borough of Stockport. The 14-mile (23 km) route from Woodford in the south to Reddish in the north, combines rural footpaths, quiet lanes and river valleys with urban landscapes and parklands. Features along the route include Houldsworth Mill and Square, the start of the River Mersey at the confluence of the River Tame and River Goyt, Stockport Town Centre, Vernon and Woodbank Parks and the Happy Valley. The route also passes through Woodbank Park, where Perry played some exhibition tennis matches.

In 2009, Perry was selected by the Royal Mail for their "Eminent Britons" commemorative postage stamp issue. In November 2010, Prince Edward, Earl of Wessex and John Perry, Fred Perry's grandson, opened Fred Perry House in Stockport. The building, which is the borough's new civic headquarters, will be used by various local government agencies. In June 2012, an English Heritage blue plaque was unveiled on the house at 223 Pitshanger Lane, Ealing, London, where Perry lived between 1919 and 1935.

=== World ===
Perry was inducted into the International Tennis Hall of Fame in Newport, Rhode Island, in 1975.

Perry received a Doctor of Laws degree, honoris causa, from Washington and Lee University on 4 June 1987. He had coached the W&L tennis team in 1941 and again in 1947.

In the United States, two drives in El Paso, Texas, and Baton Rouge, Louisiana, and a street in Springfield, Tennessee, are named after Fred Perry.

== World Table Tennis Championships ==
Gold 1; Silver 1; Bronze 4

- 1928 Stockholm: Silver Doubles; Bronze Mixed Doubles; Bronze Team
- 1929 Budapest: Gold Singles; Bronze Doubles; Bronze Team

== Major finals ==
=== Major tournaments ===
==== Singles: 10 (8 titles, 2 runner-ups) ====
Result	Year	Championship	Surface	Opponent	Score
Win	1933	U.S. Championships	Grass	(Australia) Jack Crawford	6–3, 11–13, 4–6, 6–0, 6–1
Win	1934	Australian Championships	Grass	(Australia) Jack Crawford	6–3, 7–5, 6–1
Win	1934	Wimbledon	Grass	(Australia) Jack Crawford	6–3, 6–0, 7–5
Win	1934	U.S. Championships (2)	Grass	(United States) Wilmer Allison	6–4, 6–3, 3–6, 1–6, 8–6
Loss	1935	Australian Championships	Grass	(Australia) Jack Crawford	6–2, 4–6, 4–6, 4–6
Win	1935	French Championships	Clay	(Germany) Gottfried von Cramm	6–3, 3–6, 6–1, 6–3
Win	1935	Wimbledon (2)	Grass	(Germany) Gottfried von Cramm	6–2, 6–4, 6–4
Loss	1936	French Championships	Clay	(Nazi Germany) Gottfried von Cramm	0–6, 6–2, 2–6, 6–2, 0–6
Win	1936	Wimbledon (3)	Grass	(Nazi Germany) Gottfried von Cramm	6–1, 6–1, 6–0
Win	1936	U.S. Championships (3)	Grass	(United States) Don Budge	2–6, 6–2, 8–6, 1–6, 10–8

==== Doubles: 4 (2 titles, 2 runner-ups) ====
Result	Year	Championship	Surface	Partner	Opponents	Score
Loss	1932	Wimbledon	Grass	(United Kingdom) Pat Hughes	(French Third Republic) Jean Borotra (French Third Republic) Jacques Brugnon	6–0, 4–6, 3–6, 7–5, 7–5
Win	1933	French Championships	Clay	(United Kingdom) Pat Hughes	(Australia) Vivian McGrath (Australia) Adrian Quist	6–2, 6–4, 2–6, 7–5
Win	1934	Australian Championships	Grass	(United Kingdom) Pat Hughes	(Australia) Adrian Quist (Australia) Don Turnbull	6–8, 6–3, 6–4, 3–6, 6–3
Loss	1935	Australian Championships	Grass	(United Kingdom) Pat Hughes	(Australia) Jack Crawford (Australia) Vivian McGrath	6–4, 8–6, 6–2

==== Mixed doubles: 5 (4 titles, 1 runner-up) ====
Result	Year	Championship	Surface	Partner	Opponents	Score
Win	1932	French Championships	Clay	(United Kingdom) Betty Nuthall	(United States) Helen Wills Moody (United States) Sidney Wood	6–4, 6–2
Win	1932	U.S. Championships	Grass	(United States) Sarah Palfrey Cooke	(United States) Helen Jacobs (United States) Ellsworth Vines	6–3, 7–5
Loss	1933	French Championships	Clay	(United Kingdom) Betty Nuthall	(United Kingdom) Margaret Scriven-Vivian (Australia) Jack Crawford	2–6, 3–6
Win	1935	Wimbledon	Grass	(United Kingdom) Dorothy Round	(Australia) Nell Hall Hopman (Australia) Harry Hopman	7–5, 4–6, 6–2
Win	1936	Wimbledon Championships	Grass	(United Kingdom) Dorothy Round	(United States) Sarah Palfrey Cooke (United States) Don Budge	7–9, 7–5, 6–4

=== Pro Slam tournaments ===
==== 4 finals (2 titles, 2 runner-ups) ====
Result	Year	Championship	Surface	Opponent	Score
Win	1938	US Pro	Indoor	(United States) Bruce Barnes	6–3, 6–2, 6–4
Loss	1939	US Pro	Hard	(United States) Ellsworth Vines	6–8, 8–6, 1–6, 18–20
Loss	1940	US Pro	Clay	(United States) Don Budge	3–6, 7–5, 4–6, 3–6
Win	1941	US Pro	Clay	(United States) Dick Skeen	6–4, 6–8, 6–2, 6–3

== Performance timeline ==
Fred Perry joined professional tennis in 1937 and was unable to compete in the Grand Slams tournaments.

Key
W	F	SF	QF	#R	RR	Q#	DNQ	A	NH

(W) winner; (F) finalist; (SF) semifinalist; (QF) quarterfinalist; (#R) rounds 4, 3, 2, 1; (RR) round-robin stage; (Q#) qualification round; (DNQ) did not qualify; (A) absent; (NH) not held; (SR) strike rate (events won / competed); (W–L) win–loss record.

Tournament	Amateur career								Professional career																							SR	W–L	Win %
Tournament	'29	'30	'31	'32	'33	'34	'35	'36	'37	'38	'39	'40	'41	'42	'43	'44	'45	'46	'47	'48	'49	'50	'51	'52	'53	'54	'55	'56	'57	'58	'59	SR	W–L	Win %
Grand Slam tournaments:																																8 / 23	101–15	87.07
Australian	A	A	A	A	A	W	F	A	A	A	A	A	Not held					A	A	A	A	A	A	A	A	A	A	A	A	A	A	1 / 2	9–1	90.00
French	A	A	4R	QF	QF	QF	W	F	A	A	A	Not held					A	A	A	A	A	A	A	A	A	A	A	A	A	A	A	1 / 6	22–5	81.48
Wimbledon	3R	4R	SF	QF	2R	W	W	W	A	A	A	Not held						A	A	A	A	A	A	A	A	A	A	A	A	A	A	3 / 8	36–5	87.80
U.S.	A	4R	SF	4R	W	W	SF	W	A	A	A	A	A	A	A	A	A	A	A	A	A	A	A	A	A	A	A	A	A	A	A	3 / 7	34–4	89.47
Pro Slam tournaments:																																2 / 11	19–9	67.86
U.S. Pro	A	A	A	A	A	A	A	A	A	W	F	F	W	A	A	NH	A	QF	QF	A	A	A	A	A	A	A	QF	A	A	1R	1R	2 / 9	17–7	70.83
French Pro	NH	A	A	A	NH	A	A	A	A	A	A	Not held																A	NH	A	A	0 / 0	0–0	N/A
Wembley Pro	Not held					A	A	NH	A	NH	A	Not held									A	A	QF	QF	A	NH		A	A	A	A	0 / 2	2–2	50.00
Total:																																10 / 34	120–24	83.33

== See also ==
- Lists of tennis players
- World Table Tennis Championships
- List of England players at the World Team Table Tennis Championships
- All-time tennis records – Men's singles
- Open Era tennis records – Men's singles
- Sergio Tacchini
- Lacoste

== Bibliography ==
- McCauley, Joe (2003). The History of Professional Tennis.
