= Cottenham Park =

Coordinates: 51.414505°N 0.236946°W

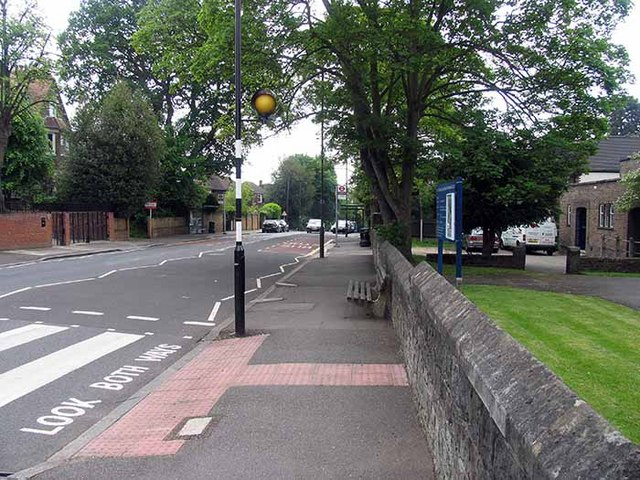
- Cottenham Park Road

- Location within Greater London
- London borough: Merton
- Ceremonial county: Greater London
- Region: London
- Country: England
- Sovereign state: United Kingdom
- Post town: LONDON
- Postcode district: SW20
- Dialling code: 020
- Police: Metropolitan
- Fire: London
- Ambulance: London
- UK Parliament: Wimbledon
- London Assembly: Merton and Wandsworth

Cottenham Park is a small district of the London Borough of Merton located to the south of Copse Hill, north of Raynes Park, in West Wimbledon, London. It was named after Charles Pepys, 1st Earl of Cottenham.

Cottenham Park is home to a recreation ground with the same name. Its facilities include a cricket ground and several tarmac tennis courts. It was opened in 1897, under the name Melbury Gardens.
