= Bruce Barnes (tennis) =

American tennis player

- Full name: Bruce Parkhouse Barnes
- Country (sports): United States
- Born: November 24, 1909; Dallas, Texas, U.S.
- Died: March 12, 1990 (aged 80)
- Turned pro: 1932 (amateur from 1928)
- Retired: 1943
- Plays: Right-handed (one-handed backhand)

Singles
- Career record: 101–56
- Career titles: 8
- Highest ranking: No. 7 (1938, Ray Bowers)

Grand Slam singles results
- US Open: 3R (1931)
- Professional majors
- US Pro: W (1943)
- Wembley Pro: RR – 5th (1934)

Bruce Parkhouse Barnes (November 24, 1909 – March 12, 1990) was a high-ranking professional American tennis player of the 1930s.

== Biography ==
Barnes was born in Dallas, Texas. As a professional, he won the 1933 world men's doubles championship with Bill Tilden, and lost the finals of the 1937 United States Professional Championship to Karel Koželuh and the 1938 finals to Fred Perry. In 1943, with the ranks of players severely depleted by World War II, he won the championship by beating John Nogrady.

He was ranked World No. 7 in Ray Bowers' pro rankings for both 1938 and 1942 (and in the amateur-pro combined rankings for the latter).

Barnes attended Austin High School. As a collegiate player at the University of Texas, Austin he won the NCAA doubles championship in 1931 partnering Karl Kamrath. He lost the singles final to Keith Gledhill of Stanford in four sets. He was a member of Delta Tau Delta International Fraternity.

Barnes was the coach of the United States Davis Cup team in 1939.

== Pro Slam tournaments ==
=== Singles: (1 title, 2 runner-ups) ===
Result	Year	Championship	Surface	Opponent	Score
Loss	1937	U.S. Pro	Clay	(Czechoslovakia) Karel Koželuh	2–6, 3–6, 6–4, 6–4, 1–6
Loss	1938	U.S. Pro	Clay	(United Kingdom) Fred Perry	3–6, 2–6, 4–6
Win	1943	U.S. Pro	Clay	(United States) John Nogrady	6–1, 7–9, 7–5, 4–6, 6–3
