= Welby Van Horn =

American tennis player and coach

- Country (sports): United States
- Born: September 8, 1920 Los Angeles, California, U.S.
- Died: September 17, 2014 (aged 94) West Palm Beach, Florida, U.S.
- Turned pro: 1942 (amateur from 1938)
- Retired: 1951
- Plays: Right-handed (one-handed backhand)

Singles
- Highest ranking: No. 5 (1946, Pro – PPA ranking)

Grand Slam singles results
- US Open: F (1939)

Other tournaments
- Professional majors
- US Pro: W (1945)
- Wembley Pro: F (1950)

Sidney Welby Van Horn (September 8, 1920 - September 17, 2014) was an American professional tennis player and tennis coach.

As a 19-year-old player, Van Horn reached the finals of the 1939 U.S. Championships beating John Bromwich only to lose to Bobby Riggs in just 56 minutes (6–4, 6–2, 6–4). One of the high points of his career was a 6–0, 6–2, 6–1 defeat of the great Bill Tilden at a match between U.S. and British Empire service teams at Wimbledon in July 1945, supposedly the worst losses of Tilden's career — Tilden, however, was 52 years old at the time while Van Horn was 25. Van Horn also won the United States Pro Championship in 1945. He was ranked as high as World No. 5 in the professional ranks (the Professional Players Association, instated by Bill Tilden) in 1946. Gordon Lowe ranked Van Horn as World No. 9 for 1939 in his amateur rankings.

He lived briefly in Atlanta, Ga., where he had been hired as Head Tennis Professional at the Piedmont Driving Club. In 1951, he moved to Puerto Rico as a coach at the Caribe Hilton Hotel's Swim and Tennis Club, where he worked with many promising juniors, the most notable being Charlie Pasarell who was ranked No.1 in the U.S. in 1967 who he continued to coach on the main tour, another notable junior was Manuel Diaz, later to become a star on the University of Georgia tennis team and UGA coach.

His career as a coach spawned institutions such as the Welby Van Horn Tennis Academy in Boca Raton, Florida, and Welby Van Horn Tennis programs in a number of locations.

== Grand Slam finals ==
=== Singles (1 runner-up) ===
Result	Year	Championship	Surface	Opponent	Score
Loss	1939	U.S. Championships	Grass	(United States) Bobby Riggs	6–4, 6–2, 6–4
