= Pancho Gonzales career statistics =

This is a list of the main career statistics of former tennis player Pancho Gonzales whose career ran from 1947 until 1974.

As an amateur player, Gonzales won at least 17 singles titles, including two Grand Slam tournaments. As a professional player, he won at least 85 singles titles, including 12 Pro Slam tournaments; at the same time he was banned from competing in the Grand Slam events from 1950 to 1967 due to being a professional player. During this professional period, he won seven times the World Pro Tour'. The Open era arrived very late for Gonzales, by which time he was in his forties. Even at this advanced age he was able to win at least 11 singles titles. Overall Gonzales won at least 113 titles in his career in a span of 25 years.

== Major titles ==
=== Performance timeline ===
Key
| W | F | SF | QF | #R | RR | Q# | DNQ | A | NH |

(W) winner; (F) finalist; (SF) semifinalist; (QF) quarterfinalist; (#R) rounds 4, 3, 2, 1; (RR) round-robin stage; (Q#) qualification round; (DNQ) did not qualify; (A) absent; (NH) not held; (SR) strike rate (events won / competed); (W–L) win–loss record.

Gonzales started playing professional tennis in 1950 and was unable to compete in 73 Grand Slam tournaments until the start of the Open Era at the 1968 French Open. (NH = not held).

| | | | | | | | | | | | | | | | | | | | Titles / Played | Career W–L | Career win % |
| Grand Slam Tournaments | Amateur | | | Professional | | | | | | | | | Open Era | | | | | | 2 / 17 | 44–15 | 74.58 |
| Grand Slam Tournaments | 1947 | 1948 | 1949 | 1950 - 1967 | | | | | | | | | 1968 | 1969 | 1970 | 1971 | 1972 | 1973 | 2 / 17 | 44–15 | 74.58 |
|---|---|---|---|---|---|---|---|---|---|---|---|---|---|---|---|---|---|---|---|---|---|
| Australian | A | A | A | Unable to compete | | | | | | | | | | 3R | A | A | A | A | 0 / 1 | 2–1 | 66.67 |
| French | A | A | SF | Unable to compete | | | | | | | | | SF | A | A | A | A | A | 0 / 2 | 9–2 | 81.82 |
| Wimbledon | A | A | 4R | Unable to compete | | | | | | | | | 3R | 4R | A | 2R | 2R | A | 0 / 5 | 10–5 | 66.67 |
| US | 2R | W | W | Unable to compete | | | | | | | | | QF | 4R | 3R | 3R | 1R | 1R | 2 / 9 | 23–7 | 76.67 |
| Pro Slam Tournaments | Professional | | | | | | | | | | | | | | | | | | 12 / 31 | 78–16 | 82.98 |
| Pro Slam Tournaments | 1950 | 1951 | 1952 | 1953 | 1954 | 1955 | 1956 | 1957 | 1958 | 1959 | 1960 | 1961 | 1962 | 1963 | 1964 | 1965 | 1966 | 1967 | 12 / 31 | 78–16 | 82.98 |
| French Pro | NH | | | | | | F | NH | SF | A | A | F | A | A | SF | A | A | A | 0 / 4 | 7–4 | 63.64 |
| Wembley Pro | W | W | W | F | NH | | W | SF | SF | A | A | SF | A | A | SF | A | A | A | 4 / 9 | 22–5 | 81.48 |
| U.S. Pro | A | F | F | W | W | W | W | W | W | W | A | W | A | QF | F | SF | A | A | 8 / 13 | 31–5 | 86.11 |
| Total: | | | | | | | | | | | | | | | | | | | 14 / 48 | 122–31 | 79.74 |

== Grand Slam and Pro Slam finals ==
=== Grand Slam finals (2–0) ===
| Result | Year | Championship | Surface | Opponent | Score |
|---|---|---|---|---|---|
| Win | 1948 | US Championships | Grass | (South Africa) Eric Sturgess | 6–2, 6–3, 14–12 |
| Win | 1949 | US Championships | Grass | (United States) Ted Schroeder | 16–18, 2–6, 6–1, 6–2, 6–4 |

=== Pro Slam finals (13–6) ===
| Result | Year | Championship | Surface | Opponent | Score |
|---|---|---|---|---|---|
| Win | 1950 | Wembley Pro | Indoor | (United States) Welby Van Horn | 6–3, 6–3, 6–2 |
| Loss | 1951 | US Pro | Grass | (Ecuador) Pancho Segura | 0–6, 6–8, 1–6 |
| Win | 1951 | Wembley Pro | Indoor | (Ecuador) Pancho Segura | 6–2, 6–2, 2–6, 6–4 |
| Loss | 1952 | US Pro | Indoor | (Ecuador) Pancho Segura | 6–3, 4–6, 6–3, 4–6, 0–6 |
| Win | 1952 | Wembley Pro | Indoor | (United States) Jack Kramer | 3–6, 3–6, 6–2, 6–4, 7–5 |
| Win | 1953 | US Pro | Indoor | (United States) Don Budge | 4–6, 6–4, 7–5, 6–2 |
| Loss | 1953 | Wembley Pro | Indoor | (Australia) Frank Sedgman | 1–6, 2–6, 2–6 |
| Win | 1954 | US Pro | Indoor | (Australia) Frank Sedgman | 6–3, 9–7, 3–6, 6–2 |
| Win | 1954 | US Pro | Cement | (Ecuador) Pancho Segura | 6–4, 4–6, 2–6, 6–2, 6–4 |
| Win | 1955 | US Pro | Indoor | (Ecuador) Pancho Segura | 21–16, 19–21, 21–8, 20–22, 21–19 |
| Win | 1956 | US Pro | Indoor | (Ecuador) Pancho Segura | 21–15, 13–21, 21–14, 22–20 |
| Loss | 1956 | French Pro | Clay | (United States) Tony Trabert | 3–6, 6–4, 7–5, 6–8, 2–6 |
| Win | 1956 | Wembley Pro | Indoor | (Australia) Frank Sedgman | 4–6, 11–9, 11–9, 9–7 |
| Win | 1957 | US Pro | Indoor | (Ecuador) Pancho Segura | 6–3, 3–6, 7–5, 6–1 |
| Win | 1958 | US Pro | Indoor | (Australia) Lew Hoad | 3–6, 4–6, 14–12, 6–1, 6–4 |
| Win | 1959 | US Pro | Indoor | (Australia) Lew Hoad | 6–4, 6–2, 6–4 |
| Win | 1961 | US Pro | Indoor | (Australia) Frank Sedgman | 6–3, 7–5 |
| Loss | 1961 | French Pro | Clay | (Australia) Ken Rosewall | 6–2, 4–6, 3–6, 6–8 |
| Loss | 1964 | US Pro | Grass | (Australia) Rod Laver | 6–4, 3–6, 5–7, 4–6 |

== Career titles ==
| Amateur | | | Professional | | | | | | | | | | | | | | | | | | Open Era | | | | | | Total |
|---|---|---|---|---|---|---|---|---|---|---|---|---|---|---|---|---|---|---|---|---|---|---|---|---|---|---|---|
| 1947 | 1948 | 1949 | 1950 | 1951 | 1952 | 1953 | 1954 | 1955 | 1956 | 1957 | 1958 | 1959 | 1960 | 1961 | 1962 | 1963 | 1964 | 1965 | 1966 | 1967 | 1968 | 1969 | 1970 | 1971 | 1972 | 1973 | Total |
| 0 | 8 | 9 | 2 | 1 | 4 | 3 | 5 | 4 | 6 | 5 | 8 | 5 | 1 | 5 | 0 | 0 | 5 | 4 | 4 | 1 | 2 | 2 | 1 | 3 | 3 | 0 | 113 |

=== Amateur era ===
Singles (1948–1949) : 17 titles

| Date | | Event | Surface | Runner up | Score |
|---|---|---|---|---|---|
| 1948 | Jan 11 | Tampa Dixie Championships (United States) | ? | (United States) Gardner Larned | 2–6, 3–6, 6–2, 7–5, 6–2 |
| 1948 | Jan 25 | Orlando Florida Championships (United States) | ? | (Peru) Enrique Buse | 6–2, 3–6, 6–3, 6–3 |
| 1948 | Jun 12 | Berkeley California Championships (United States) | ? | (United States) Earl Cochell | 1–6, 10–8, 6–3, 6–4 |
| 1948 | Jun 27 | Maplewood N.J. Championships (United States) | ? | (United States) Don McNeil | 6–3, 4–6, 2–6, 6–4, 6–0 |
| 1948 | Jul 11 | Indianapolis Western Championships (United States) | Clay | (United States) Jack Tuero | 6–3, 6–1, 6–3 |
| 1948 | July 18 | River Forest U.S. Clay Court (United States) | Clay | (United States) Clarence Carter | 7–5, 6–2, 6–3 |
| 1948 | Aug 7 | Southampton Meadow Club (United States) | Grass | (United States) Budge Patty | 6–3, 6–0, 6–3 |
| 1948 | Sep 19 | U.S. National Champ., Forest Hills (United States) | Grass | (South Africa) Eric Sturgess | 6–2, 6–3, 14–12 |
| 1949 | Feb 12 | La Jolla Beach Classic (United States) | ? | (United States) Ted Schroeder | 6–2, 6–8, 9–7 |
| 1949 | Feb 20 | Los Angeles Metropolitan (United States) | ? | (United States) Seymour Greenberg | 6–1, 8–6 |
| 1949 | Mar 26 | New York U.S. Indoor (United States) | Wood ? | (United States) Bill Talbert | 10–8, 6–0, 4–6, 9–7 |
| 1949 | Apr 30 | Ojai Valley California Championships (United States) | ? | (United States) Bob Falkenburg | 7–5, 6–3 |
| 1949 | Jul 18 | River Forest U.S. Clay Court (United States) | Clay | (United States) Frank Parker | 6–1, 3–6, 8–6, 6–3 |
| 1949 | Jul 23 | Haverford Pennsylvania Grass Court (United States) | Grass | (United States) Vic Seixas | 6–4, 6–1, 6–0 |
| 1949 | Aug 22 | Newport Casino Invitational (United States) | Grass | (United States) Gardnar Mulloy | 10–8, 9–11, 6–3, 6–4 |
| 1949 | Sep 15 | U.S. National Champ., Forest Hills (United States) | Grass | (United States) Ted Schroeder | 16–18, 2–6, 6–1, 6–2, 6–4 |
| 1949 | Sep 18 | Los Angeles Pacific Southwest (United States) | Hard ? | (United States) Ted Schroeder | 6–3, 9–11, 8–6, 6–4 |

=== Professional era ===
Singles (1950–1967) : 85 titles

| Date | | Event | Surface | Runner up | Score |
|---|---|---|---|---|---|
| 1950 | March 26 | Philadelphia Pro Championships (United States) | Wood | (United States) Jack Kramer | 7–5 6–3 6–4 |
| 1950 | September 30 | Wembley Pro, London Indoor (England) | Wood | (United States) Welby Van Horn | 6–3 6–3 6–2 |
| 1951 | September 28 | Wembley Pro, London Indoor (England) | Wood | (Ecuador) Pancho Segura | 6–2 6–2 2–6 6–4 |
| 1952 | March 29 | Philadelphia Pro Championships (United States) | Wood | (Ecuador) Pancho Segura | 6–2 6–3 |
| 1952 | August 2 | Scarborough Slazenger Pro (England) | Grass | (Ecuador) Pancho Segura | 15–13 6–3 6–3 |
| 1952 | August 31 | Berlin Rot Weiss Club Pro (Germany) | Clay | (United States) Don Budge | 8–6 7–5 |
| 1952 | September 28 | Wembley Pro, London Indoor (England) | Wood | (United States) Jack Kramer | 3–6 3–6 6–2 6–4 7–5 |
| 1953 | June 21 | U.S. Pro Championships Cleveland (United States) | Indoors | (United States) Don Budge | 4–6 6–4 7–5 6–2 |
| 1953 | August 16 | Los Angeles California State Pro (United States) | Hard | (United States) Don Budge | 5–7 6–3 6–4 |
| 1953 | September 20 | Québec Canadian Pro (Canada) | Hard | (United States) Bobby Riggs | 6–0 6–4 6–4 |
| 1954 | January 4 | New York (M.S.G.) Pro (United States) | Wood | (Ecuador) Pancho Segura | 7–9 6–4 6–4 |
| 1954 | January 12 | Norfolk Pro Championships (United States) | ? | (Ecuador) Pancho Segura | 8–5 (pro set) |
| 1954 | January 13 | Charlottesville Pro Championships (United States) | ? | (Ecuador) Pancho Segura (2nd) | 11–9 (pro set) |
| 1954 | January 15 | New Haven Pro Championships (United States) | ? | (Ecuador) Pancho Segura | 9–7 (pro set) |
| 1954 | January 17 | Buffalo Pro Championships (United States) | ? | (Australia) Frank Sedgman | 11–9 (pro set) |
| 1954 | January 19 | Toronto Canadian Pro Championships (Canada) | ? | (Ecuador) Pancho Segura | 8–5 (pro set) |
| 1954 | January 25 | Saint-Louis Pro Championships (United States) | ? | (Australia) Frank Sedgman | 10–8 (pro set) |
| 1954 | January 27 | Cincinnati Pro Championships (United States) | ? | (Ecuador) Pancho Segura | 9–7 (pro set) |
| 1954 | January 30 | White Plains Pro Championships (United States) | ? | (Ecuador) Pancho Segura | 8–2 (pro set) |
| 1954 | February 2 | Rochester Pro Championships (United States) | ? | (Ecuador) Pancho Segura | 10–8 (pro set) |
| 1954 | February 3 | Albany Pro Championships (United States) | ? | (Ecuador) Pancho Segura | 10–8 (pro set) |
| 1954 | February 4 | Boston Pro Indoor Championships (United States) | ? | (Ecuador) Pancho Segura | 9–7 (pro set) |
| 1954 | February 8 | Ottawa Pro Championships (Canada) | ? | (Ecuador) Pancho Segura | 8–6 (pro set) |
| 1954 | February 9 | Ithaca Pro Championships (United States) | ? | (Ecuador) Pancho Segura | 8–4 (pro set) |
| 1954 | February 12 | Fort Wayne Pro Championships (United States) | ? | (Australia) Frank Sedgman | 28–26 (pro set) |
| 1954 | February 14 | Kansas Pro Championships (United States) | ? | (Ecuador) Pancho Segura | 8–4 (pro set) |
| 1954 | February 23 | Sacramento Pro Championships (United States) | ? | (Ecuador) Pancho Segura | 8–4 (pro set) |
| 1954 | March 3 | San Antonio Pro Championships (United States) | ? | (Ecuador) Pancho Segura | ? |
| 1954 | March 5 | Dallas Pro Championships (United States) | ? | (Ecuador) Pancho Segura | 8–3 (pro set) |
| 1954 | March 20 | New York Pro Championships (United States) | ? | (Ecuador) Pancho Segura | 8–5 (pro set) |
| 1954 | March 29 | El Paso Pro Championships (United States) | ? | (Ecuador) Pancho Segura | 10–8 (pro set) |
| 1954 | April 4 | Mexico Pro Championships (Mexico) | ? | (Australia) Frank Sedgman | 9–7 6–4 |
| 1954 | April 7 | Oklahoma City Pro Championships (United States) | ? | (Ecuador) Pancho Segura | 8–6 (pro set) |
| 1954 | May 2 | World Pro Championships Cleveland (United States) | Indoors | (Australia) Frank Sedgman | 6–3 9–7 3–6 6–2 |
| 1954 | May 25 | Palo Alto Pro Championships (United States) | ? | (Australia) Frank Sedgman | 8–4 (pro set) |
| 1954 | June 13 | U.S. Pro Championships, L.A. Tennis Club (USA) | Hard | (Ecuador) Pancho Segura | 6–4 4–6 2–6 6–2 6–4 |
| 1955 | March 8 | U.S. Pro Championships Cleveland (United States) | Indoors | (Ecuador) Pancho Segura | 21–16 19–21 21–8 20–22 21–19 |
| 1955 | July 30 | Scarborough Slazenger Pro (England) | Grass | (Ecuador) Pancho Segura | 6–2 7–5 8–6 |
| 1955 | August 23 | Ostend Pro Championships R.R. (Belgium) | Clay | (Ecuador) Pancho Segura | 6–1 6–1 |
| 1955 | November 14 | Los Angeles U.S. Pro Hard Court (United States) | Hard | (Ecuador) Pancho Segura | 21–19 6–3 6–4 |
| 1956 | April 6 | U.S. Pro Championships Cleveland (United States) | Indoors | (Ecuador) Pancho Segura | 21–15 13–21 21–14 22–20 |
| 1956 | July 3 | Buenos Aires Argentina Pro R.R. (Argentine) | Clay | (Australia) Frank Sedgman | 7–9 6–2 6–1 7–9 10–8 |
| 1956 | July 16 | Chicago Pro Championships (United States) | ? | (Australia) Frank Sedgman | 2 sets to zero |
| 1956 | August 5 | Los Angeles Pro Masters R.R. (United States) | Hard | (Australia) Frank Sedgman | 9–7 3–6 6–1 |
| 1956 | September 20 | Milan Trophy of Champions (Italy) | Clay | (Australia) Frank Sedgman | 6–4 6–4 6–3 |
| 1956 | September 29 | Wembley Pro, London Indoor (England) | Wood | (Australia) Frank Sedgman | 4–6 11–9 11–9 9–7 |
| 1957 | April 12 | U.S. Pro Championships Cleveland (United States) | Indoors | (Ecuador) Pancho Segura | 6–3 3–6 7–5 6–1 |
| 1957 | April 21 | Hamilton Bermuda Pro (Bermuda) | Clay | (Ecuador) Pancho Segura | 7–9 6–4 6–3 |
| 1957 | May 24 | San Francisco Cow-Palace Pro (United States) | ? | (Ecuador) Pancho Segura | 6–4 6–4 |
| 1957 | July 21 | Forest Hills T.O.C. R.R. (United States)^{2} | Grass | (Australia) Frank Sedgman | 5–7 7–5 3–6 6–3 6–3 |
| 1957 | August 3 | Los Angeles Pro Masters R.R. (United States) | Hard | (Australia) Frank Sedgman | 6–1 3–6 6–1 |
| 1958 | May 5 | U.S. Pro Championships Cleveland (United States) | Indoors | (United States) Lew Hoad | 3–6 4–6 14–12 6–1 6–4 |
| 1958 | May 26 | Salt Lake City Pro Championships (United States) | ? | (Australia) Ken Rosewall | 10–8 (pro set) |
| 1958 | May 27 | Boise Pro Championships (United States) | ? | (Australia) Ken Rosewall | 8–4 (pro set) |
| 1958 | May 28 | Spokane Pro Championships (United States) | ? | (United States) Tony Trabert | 8–5 (pro set) |
| 1958 | May 30 | Vancouver Pro Championships (Canada) | ? | (United States) Tony Trabert | 8–2 (pro set) |
| 1958 | June 2 | Bakersfield Pro Championships (United States) | Hard | (Ecuador) Pancho Segura | 8–6 (pro set) |
| 1958 | June 3 | Palo Alto Pro Championships (United States) | Hard | (Australia) Frank Sedgman | 8–6 (pro set) |
| 1958 | June 24 | Forest Hills T.O.C. (United States)^{2} | Grass | (Australia) Ken Rosewall (2nd) | 19–17 5–7 6–4 |
| 1959 | February 8 | Sydney Marks Athletic Field (Australia) | Wood, sand/paint surface | (Australia) Frank Sedgman | 7–5 6–4 0–6 6–4 |
| 1959 | April 26 | U.S. Pro Championships Cleveland (United States) | Indoors | (Australia) Lew Hoad | 6–4 6–2 6–4 |
| 1959 | June 14 | Los Angeles Masters Round Robin (United States) | Cement | (Australia) Lew Hoad (2nd) | round robin |
| 1959 | June 21 | Toronto O'Keefe Pro Championships (Canada) | Red Clay | (Australia) Frank Sedgman | 6–1 6–4 6–1 |
| 1959 | December 13 | Sydney Ampol White City Tournament of Champions (Australia)^{2} | Grass | (Australia) Lew Hoad | 11-9 6–1 6–1 |
| 1960 | May 16 | Tuscaloosa Pro Championships (United States) | Clay ? | (United States) Sam Giammalva | 6–1 6–4 6–4 |
| 1961 | May 3 | U.S. Pro Championships Cleveland (United States) | Indoors | (Australia) Frank Sedgman | 6–3 7–5 |
| 1961 | August 20 | Geneva Gold Trophy (Switzerland) | Clay | (Australia) Ken Rosewall | 8–6 6–0 |
| 1961 | October 2 | Copenhagen Scandinavian Pro (Denmark) | ? | (United States) Alex Olmedo | 4–6 7–5 8–6 7–5 |
| 1961 | October 7 | Milan Pro Championships (Italy) | Clay | (Australia) Ashley Cooper | 6–3 6–2 |
| 1961 | October 20 | Vienna Austrian Pro Indoor (Austria) | Wood | (United States) Barry MacKay (tennis) | 6–2 6–4 6–4 |
| 1962 | First retirement of Pancho Gonzales in late October 1961. | | | | |
| 1963 | Pancho Gonzales returned to competition in 1963 playing just one match at the U.S. Pro and losing to Alejandro Olmedo. | | | | |
| 1964 | May 16 | Cleveland Pepsi Cola World Pro (United States) | Grass | (Spain) Andrés Gimeno | 6–2 15–13 |
| 1964 | May 31 | White Plains U.S. Pro indoor (United States) | Wood | (Australia) Ken Rosewall | 8–6 (pro set) |
| 1964 | July 21 | Wembley Pro, London Golden Racket (England)^{1} | ? | (Australia) Lew Hoad | 0–6 6–4 9–7 |
| 1964 | July 24 | Knokke-le-Zoute Pro (Belgium)^{1} | Clay | (Australia) Rod Laver | 6–3 8–6 |
| 1964 | December 13 | Hollywood Florida Pro (United States) | Clay | (United States) Bernard Bartzen | 6–4 8–6 |
| 1965 | January 23 | Sydney N.S.W. Pro Championships (Australia) | Grass | (Australia) Ken Rosewall | 8–6 3–6 6–4 |
| 1965 | April 11 | Orlando Florida Pro (United States) | Clay | (Ecuador) Pancho Segura | 6–1 6–1 |
| 1965 | May | Dallas CBS TV Pro Series (United States) | Clay | (Australia) Ken Rosewall | 8–10 7–5 12–10 |
| 1965 | June 6 | Seattle Seafirst Greater Pro (United States) | ? | (Australia) Rod Laver | 6–3 6–4 |
| 1966 | February 6 | Florida Pro Championships (United States) | Clay | (Australia) Warren Woodcock | 6–2 6–0 |
| 1966 | March 31 | Wembley, London BBC-2 Trophy (England) | ? | (Australia) Rod Laver | 6–3 5–7 12–10 |
| 1966 | September 18 | Birmingham Professional Tennis Classic, (United States) | Clay | (United States) Crawford Grassnry | 6–2 7–5 |
| 1966 | December 4 | Hollywood Pro Challenge Cup, (United States) | Clay | (Australia) Rod Laver | 6–4 6–2 |
| 1967 | May 7 | Birmingham Professional Tennis Classic, (United States) | Clay | (United Kingdom) Alan Mills | 6–4 6–2 |

Notes:

- All tournaments with a final pro set are basically 4-men tournaments.
- ^{1} : 4-men tournaments
- ^{2} : T.O.C. = Tournament of Champions.

=== Open Era ===
Singles (1968–1972) : 11

| Date | | Event | Surface | Runner up | Score |
|---|---|---|---|---|---|
| 1968 | July 20 | NTL Los Angeles Pro Championships (United States) | Carpet(i) | (Australia) Rod Laver | 1–6, 6–3, 6–4 |
| 1968 | October 1 | Midland Pro Championships (United States) | ? | (Australia) Roy Emerson | 7–5, 6–3 |
| 1969 | September 21 | Los Angeles Pacific Southwest Open (United States) | ? | (United States) Cliff Richey | 6–0, 7–5 |
| 1969 | October 12 | Las Vegas Howard Hughes Open (United States) | Hard | (United States) Arthur Ashe | 6–0, 6–2, 6–4 |
| 1970 | May 17 | Las Vegas Howard Hughes Open (United States) | Hard | (Australia) Rod Laver | 6–1, 7–5, 5–7, 6–3 |
| 1971 | May 9 | Los Angeles II Southern California Championships (United States) | Hard | (United States) Jimmy Connors | 6–4, 4–6, 6–1 |
| 1971 | September 26 | Los Angeles Pacific Southwest Open (United States) | Hard | (United States) Jimmy Connors | 2–6, 6–3, 6–3 |
| 1971 | December 16 | Kingston Rothmans International (Jamaica) | Hard | (United States) Clark Graebner | 6–4, 4–6, 6–3 |
| 1972 | February 6 | Des Moines Open (United States) | Carpet | (France) Georges Goven | 3–6, 4–6, 6–3, 6–4, 6–2 |
| 1972 | December 14 | Kingston Rothmans International (Jamaica) | Hard | (United States) Clark Graebner | 6–3, 6–4 |
| 1972 | May 14 | Los Angeles II Southern California Championships (United States) | Hard | (Peru) Alex Olmedo | 6–3, 6–2 |

== Professional tours ==
Singles (1950–1961) : 10 tours

| Date | Tour | Standings |
|---|---|---|
| 1949 October – 1950 June | World Pro Tour | 1) (United States) Jack Kramer 96–27; 2) (United States) Pancho Gonzales 27–96 |
| 1951; January – February | Australian Pro Tour | 1) (United States) Pancho Gonzales 36–6; 2) (United States) Dinny Pails 27–15; 3) (United States) Frank Parker 14–28; 4) (United States) Don Budge 9–33 |
| 1954; January 3 – May | World Pro Tour (1): Pancho Gonzales defeated to Pancho Segura 30–21 (or 20); Pancho Gonzales defeated to Frank Sedgman 30–21 (or 20); Pancho Gonzales defeated to Don Budge ?-1 | 1) (United States) Pancho Gonzales; 2) (Ecuador) Pancho Segura or (Australia) Frank Sedgman or (United States) Don Budge |
| 1954; November – December | Australian Pro Tour | 1) (United States) Pancho Gonzales; 2) (Australia) Frank Sedgman or (Ecuador) Pancho Segura; 4) (Australia) Ken McGregor |
| 1955 December 9 – 1956 June 3 | World Pro Tour (2); This was a head-to-head tour in the United States. | 1) (United States) Pancho Gonzales 74–27; 2) (United States) Tony Trabert 27–74 |
| 1956; November – December | South African Tour | 1) (United States) Pancho Gonzales 9–4; 2) (Australia) Frank Sedgman 7–6; 3) (United States) Tony Trabert 6–7; 4) (Australia) Rex Hartwig 4–9 |
| 1957; January 14 – May | World Pro Tour (3) | 1) (United States) Pancho Gonzales 50–26; 2) (Australia) Ken Rosewall 26–50 |
| 1958; January – April (or May) | World Pro Tour (4) | 1) (United States) Pancho Gonzales 51–36; 2) (Australia) Lew Hoad 36–51 |
| 1959; February – May | World Pro Tour (5) | 1) (United States) Pancho Gonzales 47–15; 2) (Australia) Lew Hoad 42–20; 3) (Australia) Ashley Cooper 21–40; 4) (Australia) Mal Anderson 13–48 |
| 1960; January – May | World Pro Tour (6) | 1) (United States) Pancho Gonzales 49–8; 2) (Australia) Ken Rosewall 32–25; 3) (Ecuador) Pancho Segura 22–28; 4) (Peru) Alex Olmedo 11–44 |
| 1960 December 30 – 1961 April | World Pro Tour (7); There were 47 World Series round robin matches for the world championship among 6 players, followed by 28 head-to-head matches between the top 1 & 2 and 3 & 4 to determine the final champion. Ken Rosewall, however, took several long vacations and played very little in the first half of the year; substitutions were permitted for injured players in the round robin: * Pancho Gonzales by Pancho Segura * Lew Hoad by Tony Trabert, Ashley Cooper and Frank Sedgman | Round Robin: 1) (United States) Pancho Gonzales 33–14; 2) (Spain) Andrés Gimeno 27–20; 3) (Australia) Lew Hoad 24–23; 4) (United States) Barry MacKay (tennis) 22–25; 5) (Peru) Alex Olmedo 18–29; 6) (United States) Butch Buchholz 16–31 Finals: 1) (United States) Pancho Gonzales 21–7; 2) (Spain) Andrés Gimeno 7–21; 3) (Australia) Frank Sedgman 15–13; 4) (United States) Barry MacKay (tennis) 13–15 |

== Sources ==
- Michel Sutter, Vainqueurs Winners 1946–2003, Paris 2003.
- World Tennis Magazines.
- Joe McCauley, The History of Professional Tennis, London 2001.
