= 1970 Pacific Southwest Open – Men's doubles =

Men's doubles
- 1970 Pacific Southwest Open

Final
- Champion: (Netherlands) Tom Okker (United States) Marty Riessen
- Runner-up: (United States) Bob Lutz (United States) Stan Smith
- Score: 7–6, 6–2

Details
- Draw: 32
- Seeds: 8

Events
Singles	men	women
Doubles	men	women
← 1969 ·	Los Angeles Open	· 1971 →

The 1970 Pacific Southwest Open – Men's doubles was an event of the 1970 Pacific Southwest Open tennis tournament and was played on outdoor hard courts at the Los Angeles Tennis Center in Los Angeles, California in the United States between September 21 and September 27, 1970. Pancho Gonzales and Ron Holmberg were the defending Pacific Southwest Open champions but did not compete together in this edition. Sixth-seeded team of Tom Okker and Marty Riessen won the doubles title by defeating fifth-seeded pairing Bob Lutz and Stan Smith in the final 7–6, 6–2.

== Seeds ==
1. (Australia) John Newcombe / (Australia) Tony Roche (quarterfinals, retired)
2. (Socialist Federal Republic of Yugoslavia) Nikola Pilić / (United States) Cliff Richey (qecond round)
3. (Australia) Roy Emerson / (Australia) Rod Laver (quarterfinals)
4. (withdrew)
5. (United States) Bob Lutz / (United States) Stan Smith (final)
6. (Netherlands) Tom Okker / (United States) Marty Riessen (champions)
7. (Australia) Owen Davidson / (Australia) Fred Stolle (first round)
8. (United States) Arthur Ashe / (United States) Dennis Ralston (second round)

== Draw ==
=== Key ===
- Q = Qualifier
- WC = Wild card
- LL = Lucky loser
- Alt = Alternate
- ITF = ITF entry
- PR = Protected ranking
- SR = Special ranking
- SE = Special exempt
- JE = Junior exempt
- JR = Junior Accelerator Programme entrant
- CO = College Accelerator Programme entrant
- NG = Next Gen Accelerator Program entrant
- w/o = Walkover
- r = Retired
- d = Defaulted

=== Finals ===
Semifinals
(United States) Tom Gorman (United States) Dick Knight	5	5
5	(United States) Bob Lutz (United States) Stan Smith	7	7
6	(Netherlands) Tom Okker (United States) Marty Riessen	6	7
(Australia) Dick Crealy (Australia) Allan Stone	2	6

Final
5	(United States) Bob Lutz (United States) Stan Smith	6	2
6	(Netherlands) Tom Okker (United States) Marty Riessen	7	6

=== Top half ===
First Round
2	(Socialist Federal Republic of Yugoslavia) Nikola Pilić (United States) Cliff Richey	6	6
(United States) Steve Fiske (United States) John Tidball	3	2
(United States) Tom Gorman (United States) Dick Knight	6	6
(Egypt) Ismail El Shafei (Denmark) Torben Ulrich	4	4
7	(Australia) Owen Davidson (Australia) Fred Stolle	6	6
(United States) Ronald Holmberg (Czechoslovakia) Jan Kodeš	7	7
(Mexico) Marcello Lara (United States) Tom Leonard	4	6
(United States) Jimmy Connors (United States) Pancho Gonzales	6	5^{r}
3	(Australia) Roy Emerson (Australia) Rod Laver	7	6
(Argentina) Lito Álvarez (Pakistan) Haroon Rahim	5	4
(United States) Clark Graebner (South Africa) Raymond Moore	7	6
(United States) Frank Froehling (Mexico) Joaquín Loyo-Mayo	6	4
5	(United States) Bob Lutz (United States) Stan Smith	6	6	7
(Australia) Terry Addison (Australia) Bob Carmichael	7	3	5
(Chile) Patricio Cornejo (Chile) Jaime Fillol	6	7
(Jamaica) Richard Russell (United States) Lenny Schloss	1	6

Second Round
2	(Socialist Federal Republic of Yugoslavia) Nikola Pilić (United States) Cliff Richey	4	4
(United States) Tom Gorman (United States) Dick Knight	6	6
(United States) Ronald Holmberg (Czechoslovakia) Jan Kodeš	7	6
(Mexico) Marcello Lara (United States) Tom Leonard	6	3
3	(Australia) Roy Emerson (Australia) Rod Laver	6	7
(United States) Clark Graebner (South Africa) Raymond Moore	3	6
5	(United States) Bob Lutz (United States) Stan Smith	7	6
(Chile) Patricio Cornejo (Chile) Jaime Fillol	6	4

Quarterfinals
(United States) Tom Gorman (United States) Dick Knight	6	6	6
(United States) Ronald Holmberg (Czechoslovakia) Jan Kodeš	2	7	3
3	(Australia) Roy Emerson (Australia) Rod Laver	5	3
5	(United States) Bob Lutz (United States) Stan Smith	7	6

Semifinals
(United States) Tom Gorman (United States) Dick Knight	5	5
5	(United States) Bob Lutz (United States) Stan Smith	7	7

=== Bottom half ===
First Round
(New Zealand) Brian Fairlie (Australia) Ray Ruffels	7	7
(United States) Jim McManus (United States) Jim Osborne	6	5
(United States) Roy Barth (United States) Steve Tidball	6	6
6	(Netherlands) Tom Okker (United States) Marty Riessen	7	7
(United States) Charlie Pasarell (United States) Erik van Dillen	7	7
(United Kingdom) Mark Cox (United Kingdom) Graham Stilwell	6	5
(United States) Mike Machette (United States) George Taylor	3	4
LL	(United States) Tom Edlefsen (South Africa) Frew McMillan	6	6
(Australia) Dick Crealy (Australia) Allan Stone	7	7
(Spain) Andrés Gimeno (United Kingdom) Roger Taylor	6	5
(Australia) Ray Keldie (United States) Ken Stuart	3	6
8	(United States) Arthur Ashe (United States) Dennis Ralston	6	7
(United States) Alex Olmedo (Ecuador) Pancho Segura	6	6
(Australia) John Cooper (Brazil) Thomaz Koch	4	2
(United States) Chico Hagey (Mexico) Raúl Ramírez	4	4
1	(Australia) John Newcombe (Australia) Tony Roche	6	6

Second Round
(New Zealand) Brian Fairlie (Australia) Ray Ruffels	3	1
6	(Netherlands) Tom Okker (United States) Marty Riessen	6	6
(United States) Charlie Pasarell (United States) Erik van Dillen	6	7
LL	(United States) Tom Edlefsen (South Africa) Frew McMillan	4	6
(Australia) Dick Crealy (Australia) Allan Stone	4	7	6
8	(United States) Arthur Ashe (United States) Dennis Ralston	6	6	4
(United States) Alex Olmedo (Ecuador) Pancho Segura	2	2
1	(Australia) John Newcombe (Australia) Tony Roche	6	6

Quarterfinals
6	(Netherlands) Tom Okker (United States) Marty Riessen	6	6
(United States) Charlie Pasarell (United States) Erik van Dillen	3	4
(Australia) Dick Crealy (Australia) Allan Stone	7	6	3
1	(Australia) John Newcombe (Australia) Tony Roche	6	7	2^{r}

Semifinals
6	(Netherlands) Tom Okker (United States) Marty Riessen	6	7
(Australia) Dick Crealy (Australia) Allan Stone	2	6
