= 1970 Pacific Southwest Open – Men's singles =

Men's singles
- 1970 Pacific Southwest Open

Final
- Champion: (Australia) Rod Laver
- Runner-up: (Australia) John Newcombe
- Score: 4–6, 6–4, 7–6^{(7–5)}

Details
- Draw: 64
- Seeds: 16

Events
Singles	men	women
Doubles	men	women
← 1969 ·	Los Angeles Open	· 1971 →

The 1970 Pacific Southwest Open – Men's singles was an event of the 1970 Pacific Southwest Open tennis tournament and was played on outdoor hard courts at the Los Angeles Tennis Center in Los Angeles, California, in the United States between September 21 and September 27, 1970. Pancho Gonzales was the defending Pacific Southwest Open champion but was defeated in the quarterfinals. First-seeded Rod Laver won the title by defeating second-seeded John Newcombe 4–6, 6–4, 7–6^{(7–5)} in the final.

== Seeds ==
1. (Australia) Rod Laver (champion)
2. (Australia) John Newcombe (final)
3. (Australia) Tony Roche (third round)
4. (Australia) Roy Emerson (first round)
5. (United States) Pancho Gonzales (quarterfinals)
6. (United States) Cliff Richey (second round)
7. (United States) Arthur Ashe (semifinals)
8. (Spain) Andrés Gimeno (third round)
9. (United States) Dennis Ralston (second round)
10. (United Kingdom) Roger Taylor (third round)
11. (Netherlands) Tom Okker (second round)
12. (United States) Stan Smith (quarterfinals)
13. (Australia) Fred Stolle (third round)
14. (United States) Clark Graebner (quarterfinals)
15. (Socialist Federal Republic of Yugoslavia) Nikola Pilić (third round)
16. (United States) Marty Riessen (quarterfinals)

Click on the seed number of a player to go to their draw section.

== Draw ==
=== Key ===
- Q = Qualifier
- WC = Wild card
- LL = Lucky loser
- Alt = Alternate
- SE = Special exempt
- PR = Protected ranking
- ITF = ITF entry
- JE = Junior exempt
- w/o = Walkover
- r = Retired
- d = Defaulted
- SR = Special ranking

=== Finals ===
Quarterfinals
2	(Australia) John Newcombe	6	6	6
5	(United States) Pancho Gonzales	7	3	2
16	(United States) Marty Riessen	2	4
(United States) Tom Gorman	6	6
7	(United States) Arthur Ashe	7	6
14	(United States) Clark Graebner	5	0
12	(United States) Stan Smith	3	6	1
1	(Australia) Rod Laver	6	4	6

Semifinals
2	(Australia) John Newcombe	7	7
(United States) Tom Gorman	6	6
7	(United States) Arthur Ashe	0	3
1	(Australia) Rod Laver	6	6

Final
2	(Australia) John Newcombe	6	4	6
1	(Australia) Rod Laver	4	6	7

=== Top half ===
==== Section 1 ====
First Round
2	(Australia) John Newcombe	6	6
(United States) Ken Stuart	3	3
(Australia) Ray Ruffels	6	6	6
(United States) Ronald Holmberg	7	3	7
13	(Australia) Fred Stolle	7	6
(Chile) Patricio Cornejo	6	2
LL	(Mexico) Raúl Ramírez	6	6
Q	(United States) David Borelli	1	0
5	(United States) Pancho Gonzales	7	6
Q	(United States) Mike Machette	5	4
(Australia) Dick Crealy	6	3	7
(United States) Jim Osborne	4	6	6
10	(United Kingdom) Roger Taylor	6	7
(United States) Roy Barth	3	6
(United Kingdom) Mark Cox	6	6	2
(United States) Erik van Dillen	2	7	6

Second Round
2	(Australia) John Newcombe	6	6
(United States) Ronald Holmberg	4	4
13	(Australia) Fred Stolle	6	6
LL	(Mexico) Raúl Ramírez	4	4
5	(United States) Pancho Gonzales	7	3	7
(Australia) Dick Crealy	6	6	6
10	(United Kingdom) Roger Taylor	6	6	6
(United States) Erik van Dillen	2	7	4

Third Round
2	(Australia) John Newcombe	5	6	6
13	(Australia) Fred Stolle	7	3	3
5	(United States) Pancho Gonzales	3	6	6
10	(United Kingdom) Roger Taylor	6	3	3

Quarterfinals
2	(Australia) John Newcombe	6	6	6
5	(United States) Pancho Gonzales	7	3	2

==== Section 2 ====
First Round
3	(Australia) Tony Roche	6	6
Q	(United States) Dave Ranney	1	3
(New Zealand) Brian Fairlie	4	6
Q	(United States) Tom Leonard	6	7
16	(United States) Marty Riessen	6	6
Q	(United States) William Brown	2	2
(Egypt) Ismail El Shafei	6	6
(Australia) John Cooper	1	1
8	(Spain) Andrés Gimeno	6	6
(Australia) Owen Davidson	3	3
(Chile) Jaime Fillol	6	6
(United Kingdom) Graham Stilwell	1	4
11	(Netherlands) Tom Okker	7	7
Q	(Socialist Federal Republic of Yugoslavia) Vladimir Petrović	6	5
(United States) Tom Gorman	6	6
(South Africa) Frew McMillan	4	4

Second Round
3	(Australia) Tony Roche	6	7	6
Q	(United States) Tom Leonard	7	6	3
16	(United States) Marty Riessen	6	6	6
(Egypt) Ismail El Shafei	3	7	3
8	(Spain) Andrés Gimeno	6	5	7
(Chile) Jaime Fillol	3	7	5
11	(Netherlands) Tom Okker	5	6	4
(United States) Tom Gorman	7	0	6

Third Round
3	(Australia) Tony Roche	6	2	3
16	(United States) Marty Riessen	2	6	6
8	(Spain) Andrés Gimeno	3	6	4
(United States) Tom Gorman	6	4	6

Quarterfinals
16	(United States) Marty Riessen	2	4
(United States) Tom Gorman	6	6

=== Bottom half ===
==== Section 3 ====
First Round
(United States) Frank Froehling	3	5
(Czechoslovakia) Jan Kodeš	6	7
(Jamaica) Richard Russell	6	2
9	(United States) Dennis Ralston	7	6
(United States) Lenny Schloss	2	1
(United States) Bob Lutz	6	6
(Ecuador) Pancho Segura	4	6
7	(United States) Arthur Ashe	6	7
(Mexico) Joaquín Loyo-Mayo	6	3	6
(South Africa) Bob Hewitt	2	6	2
(Australia) Ray Keldie	6	4	2
14	(United States) Clark Graebner	3	6	6
(Mexico) Marcello Lara	5	5
(South Africa) Ray Moore	7	7
Q	(United States) Jimmy Connors	7	6	6
4	(Australia) Roy Emerson	6	7	4

Second Round
(Czechoslovakia) Jan Kodeš	7	6
9	(United States) Dennis Ralston	6	3
(United States) Bob Lutz	2	1
7	(United States) Arthur Ashe	6	6
(Mexico) Joaquín Loyo-Mayo	1	3
14	(United States) Clark Graebner	6	6
(South Africa) Ray Moore	1	7	4
Q	(United States) Jimmy Connors	6	6	6

Third Round
(Czechoslovakia) Jan Kodeš	6	5	3
7	(United States) Arthur Ashe	2	7	6
14	(United States) Clark Graebner	6	2	6
Q	(United States) Jimmy Connors	3	6	3

Quarterfinals
7	(United States) Arthur Ashe	7	6
14	(United States) Clark Graebner	5	0

==== Section 4 ====
First Round
(Denmark) Torben Ulrich	2	4
(United States) Charlie Pasarell	6	6
(Australia) Allan Stone	1	6
12	(United States) Stan Smith	6	7
(Pakistan) Haroon Rahim	4	6	3
(Brazil) Thomaz Koch	6	3	6
(Australia) Terry Addison	3	3
6	(United States) Cliff Richey	6	6
(United States) Alex Olmedo	6	2
(Australia) Bob Carmichael	7	6
(United States) Tom Edlefsen	4	3
15	(Socialist Federal Republic of Yugoslavia) Nikola Pilić	6	6
(United States) Allen Fox	6	7
(United States) Jim McManus	3	6
Q	(United States) Dick Knight	4	3
1	(Australia) Rod Laver	6	6

Second Round
(United States) Charlie Pasarell	4	2
12	(United States) Stan Smith	6	6
(Brazil) Thomaz Koch	6	6
6	(United States) Cliff Richey	3	2
(Australia) Bob Carmichael	6	6	4
15	(Socialist Federal Republic of Yugoslavia) Nikola Pilić	4	7	6
(United States) Allen Fox	3	1
1	(Australia) Rod Laver	6	6

Third Round
12	(United States) Stan Smith	6	6
(Brazil) Thomaz Koch	3	4
15	(Socialist Federal Republic of Yugoslavia) Nikola Pilić	5	7	4
1	(Australia) Rod Laver	7	6	6

Quarterfinals
12	(United States) Stan Smith	3	6	1
1	(Australia) Rod Laver	6	4	6
