= WSO =

WSO may refer to:

== Organizations ==
- World Safety Organization, an international professional association in safety
- World Sikh Organization, a Sikh religious and nonprofit organization

== Music ==
- Waltham Symphony Orchestra, United States
- Wheeling Symphony Orchestra, United States
- Wichita Symphony Orchestra, United States
- Winnipeg Symphony Orchestra, Canada

== Sports ==
- Cincinnati Open, a tennis tournament formerly called the "Western & Southern Open"
- Washington State Open, a USTA tennis tournament held in Seattle, Washington

== Other uses ==
- WSO, a malicious web shell
- Washabo Airstrip, Suriname (IATA code: WSO)
- Weapon systems officer, an air officer in charge of armaments
- White superficial onychomycosis, a fungal infection of the nail plate

== See also ==
- WS (disambiguation)
- WSOS (disambiguation)
