= 1969 Pacific Southwest Open – Men's singles =

Men's singles
- 1969 Pacific Southwest Open

Final
- Champion: (United States) Pancho Gonzales
- Runner-up: (United States) Cliff Richey
- Score: 6–0, 7–5

Details
- Draw: 64
- Seeds: 16

Events
Singles	men	women
Doubles	men	women
← 1968 ·	Los Angeles Open	· 1970 →

The 1969 Pacific Southwest Open – Men's singles was an event of the 1969 Pacific Southwest Open tennis tournament and was played on outdoor hard courts at the Los Angeles Tennis Center in Los Angeles, California in the United States between September 22 and September 28, 1969. Rod Laver was the defending Pacific Southwest Open champion and was the top-seed but lost in the second round. Tenth-seeded Pancho Gonzales won the singles title by defeating 16th-seeded Cliff Richey in the final 6–0, 7–5.

== Seeds ==
1. (Australia) Rod Laver (second round)
2. (Australia) John Newcombe (third round)
3. (Australia) Tony Roche (second round)
4. (United States) Arthur Ashe (quarterfinals)
5. (Netherlands) Tom Okker (second round)
6. (Australia) Ken Rosewall (third round)
7. (Australia) Roy Emerson (second round)
8. (Australia) Fred Stolle (third round)
9. (Spain) Andrés Gimeno (second round)
10. (United States) Pancho Gonzales (champion)
11. (United States) Stan Smith (quarterfinals)
12. (United States) Dennis Ralston (third round)
13. (United States) Marty Riessen (third round)
14. (United States) Butch Buchholz (semifinals)
15. (United States) Bob Lutz (quarterfinals)
16. (United States) Cliff Richey (final)

Click on the seed number of a player to go to their draw section.

== Draw ==
=== Key ===
- Q = Qualifier
- WC = Wild card
- LL = Lucky loser
- Alt = Alternate
- ITF = ITF entry
- PR = Protected ranking
- SR = Special ranking
- SE = Special exempt
- JE = Junior exempt
- JR = Junior Accelerator Programme entrant
- CO = College Accelerator Programme entrant
- NG = Next Gen Accelerator Program entrant
- w/o = Walkover
- r = Retired
- d = Defaulted

=== Finals ===
Quarterfinals
15	(United States) Bob Lutz	4	5
14	(United States) Butch Buchholz	6	7
(Brazil) Thomaz Koch	6	7	4
16	(United States) Cliff Richey	8	5	6
(United States) Jim Osborne	8	5	6
4	(United States) Arthur Ashe	6	7	3
10	(United States) Pancho Gonzales	6	9
11	(United States) Stan Smith	2	7

Semifinals
14	(United States) Butch Buchholz	4	2
16	(United States) Cliff Richey	6	6
(United States) Jim Osborne	2	9	5
10	(United States) Pancho Gonzales	6	7	7

Final
16	(United States) Cliff Richey	0	5
10	(United States) Pancho Gonzales	6	7

=== Top half ===
==== Section 1 ====
First Round
1	(Australia) Rod Laver	6	6
Q	(United States) Erik van Dillen	4	4
(South Africa) Raymond Moore	8	6
(United States) Allen Fox	6	3
15	(United States) Bob Lutz	6	6
Q	(Chile) Armando Cornejo	3	4
(United States) Ronald Holmberg	6	6
Q	(United States) Robert Kreiss	2	1
8	(Australia) Fred Stolle	6	7
(United States) Tom Gorman	2	5
(Australia) Terry Addison	3	3
(Jamaica) Richard Russell	6	6
14	(United States) Butch Buchholz	6	6
(United States) Tom Edlefsen	2	4
(Socialist Federal Republic of Yugoslavia) Nikola Pilić	5	2
Q	(United States) John Yeomans	7	6

Second Round
1	(Australia) Rod Laver	5	6	2
(South Africa) Raymond Moore	7	3	6
15	(United States) Bob Lutz	7	6
(United States) Ronald Holmberg	5	3
8	(Australia) Fred Stolle	10	6
(Jamaica) Richard Russell	8	4
14	(United States) Butch Buchholz	6	6
Q	(United States) John Yeomans	3	0

Third Round
(South Africa) Raymond Moore	2	6	3
15	(United States) Bob Lutz	6	3	6
8	(Australia) Fred Stolle	4	6	7
14	(United States) Butch Buchholz	6	3	9

Quarterfinals
15	(United States) Bob Lutz	4	5
14	(United States) Butch Buchholz	6	7

==== Section 2 ====
First Round
3	(Australia) Tony Roche	6	6
Q	(United States) Mike Machette	1	4
(Brazil) Thomaz Koch	6	6
(France) Jean-Baptiste Chanfreau	3	3
12	(United States) Dennis Ralston	4	6	7
Q	(South Africa) Rauty Krog	6	3	5
(United States) Charlie Pasarell	1	2
(United States) Jim McManus	6	6
7	(Australia) Roy Emerson	7	6	6
(United States) Alex Olmedo	9	3	2
(United Kingdom) Roger Taylor	4	6	6
(South Africa) Terry Ryan	6	2	3
16	(United States) Cliff Richey	6	6
Q	(France) Wanaro N'Godrella	4	3
(France) Pierre Barthès	10	4
(Mexico) Marcello Lara	12	6

Second Round
3	(Australia) Tony Roche	6	5	3
(Brazil) Thomaz Koch	3	7	6
12	(United States) Dennis Ralston	6	3	8
(United States) Jim McManus	2	6	6
7	(Australia) Roy Emerson	6	3	3
(United Kingdom) Roger Taylor	3	6	6
16	(United States) Cliff Richey	6	6
(Mexico) Marcello Lara	2	4

Third Round
(Brazil) Thomaz Koch	6	8	6
12	(United States) Dennis Ralston	1	10	1
(United Kingdom) Roger Taylor	7	2	1
16	(United States) Cliff Richey	5	6	6

Quarterfinals
(Brazil) Thomaz Koch	6	7	4
16	(United States) Cliff Richey	8	5	6

=== Bottom half ===
==== Section 3 ====
First Round
(United States) Dick Dell	3	4
(United States) Jim Osborne	6	6
Q	(United States) Dick Leach	2	0
9	(Spain) Andrés Gimeno	6	6
(United States) William Higgins	5	2
(United States) Roy Barth	7	6
(United Kingdom) Peter Curtis	1	2
5	(Netherlands) Tom Okker	6	6
Q	(Chile) Jaime Pinto Bravo	2	5
(Ecuador) Pancho Segura	6	7
Q	(United States) Steve Cornell	4	3
13	(United States) Marty Riessen	6	6
Q	(United States) Mike Kreiss	5	3
(Mexico) Joaquín Loyo-Mayo	7	6
Q	(United States) Ken Stuart	3	3
4	(United States) Arthur Ashe	6	6

Second Round
(United States) Jim Osborne	1	7	6
9	(Spain) Andrés Gimeno	6	5	4
(United States) Roy Barth	6	6
5	(Netherlands) Tom Okker	4	1
(Ecuador) Pancho Segura	1	1
13	(United States) Marty Riessen	6	6
(Mexico) Joaquín Loyo-Mayo	0	0
4	(United States) Arthur Ashe	6	6

Third Round
(United States) Jim Osborne	6	5	11
(United States) Roy Barth	4	7	9
13	(United States) Marty Riessen	6	3	4
4	(United States) Arthur Ashe	4	6	6

Quarterfinals
(United States) Jim Osborne	8	5	6
4	(United States) Arthur Ashe	6	7	3

==== Section 4 ====
First Round
Q	(United States) Tom Karp	3	3
(Australia) Bob Carmichael	6	6
(New Zealand) Onny Parun	0	1
10	(United States) Pancho Gonzales	6	6
(Australia) Dick Crealy	1	3
(United Kingdom) Gerald Battrick	6	6
Q	(United States) Steve Tidball	2	1
6	(Australia) Ken Rosewall	6	6
(Chile) Jaime Fillol	6	6
(Australia) Owen Davidson	1	4
Q	(United States) Jerry De Witts	2	5
11	(United States) Stan Smith	6	7
(Australia) Ray Keldie	3	3
(Australia) Ray Ruffels	6	6
(Ecuador) Pancho Guzman	1	2
2	(Australia) John Newcombe	6	6

Second Round
(Australia) Bob Carmichael	3	3
10	(United States) Pancho Gonzales	6	6
(United Kingdom) Gerald Battrick	4	1
6	(Australia) Ken Rosewall	6	6
(Chile) Jaime Fillol	7	4
11	(United States) Stan Smith	9	6
(Australia) Ray Ruffels	1	1
2	(Australia) John Newcombe	6	6

Third Round
10	(United States) Pancho Gonzales	6	11	6
6	(Australia) Ken Rosewall	4	13	4
11	(United States) Stan Smith	3	8	6
2	(Australia) John Newcombe	6	6	2

Quarterfinals
10	(United States) Pancho Gonzales	6	9
11	(United States) Stan Smith	2	7
