= 1969 Pacific Southwest Open – Men's doubles =

Men's doubles
- 1969 Pacific Southwest Open

Final
- Champion: (United States) Pancho Gonzales (United States) Ron Holmberg
- Runner-up: (United States) Jim McManus (United States) Jim Osborne
- Score: 6–3, 6–4

Details
- Draw: 32
- Seeds: 8

Events
Singles	men	women
Doubles	men	women
- Los Angeles Open

The 1969 Pacific Southwest Open – Men's doubles was an event of the 1969 Pacific Southwest Open tennis tournament and was played on outdoor hard courts at the Los Angeles Tennis Center in Los Angeles, California in the United States between September 22 and September 28, 1969. Ken Rosewall and Fred Stolle were the defending Pacific Southwest Open doubles champions but did not compete together in this edition. Unseeded Pancho Gonzales and Ron Holmberg won the title by defeating unseeded Jim McManus and Jim Osborne in the final, 6–3, 6–4.

== Seeds ==
1. (Australia) John Newcombe / (Australia) Tony Roche (second round)
2. (Australia) Roy Emerson / (Australia) Rod Laver (second round)
3. (Australia) Ken Rosewall / (Australia) Fred Stolle (quarterfinals)
4. (Netherlands) Tom Okker / (United States) Marty Riessen (second round, withdrew)
5. (United States) Bob Lutz / (United States) Stan Smith (first round)
6. (United States) Charlie Pasarell / (United States) Dennis Ralston (quarterfinals)
7. (United States) Arthur Ashe / (Spain) Andrés Gimeno (semifinals)
8. (United States) Butch Buchholz / (South Africa) Raymond Moore (first round)

== Draw ==
Key

- Q = Qualifier
- WC = Wild card
- LL = Lucky loser
- Alt = Alternate
- ITF = ITF entry
- PR = Protected ranking
- SR = Special ranking
- SE = Special exempt
- JE = Junior exempt
- JR = Junior Accelerator Programme entrant
- CO = College Accelerator Programme entrant
- NG = Next Gen Accelerator Program entrant
- w/o = Walkover
- r = Retired
- d = Defaulted

=== Finals ===
Semifinals
(United States) Jim McManus (United States) Jim Osborne	6	6
7	(United States) Arthur Ashe (Spain) Andrés Gimeno	3	4
(Australia) Dick Crealy (Brazil) Thomaz Koch	2	4
(United States) Pancho Gonzales (United States) Ronald Holmberg	6	6

Final
(United States) Jim McManus (United States) Jim Osborne	3	4
(United States) Pancho Gonzales (United States) Ronald Holmberg	6	6

=== Top half ===
First Round
1	(Australia) John Newcombe (Australia) Tony Roche	6	6
(Peru) Felix Ponte (United States) Steve Stefanki	3	4
(Australia) Owen Davidson (United Kingdom) Roger Taylor
(United States) Gene Stuart Malin; Unknown
8	(United States) Butch Buchholz (South Africa) Raymond Moore	3	6	4
(Chile) Jaime Fillol (Chile) Heinz Gildemeister	6	2	6
(United States) Jim McManus (United States) Jim Osborne	6	6
(South Africa) Rauty Krog (South Africa) Terry Ryan	4	2
3	(Australia) Ken Rosewall (Australia) Fred Stolle	6	6
(Argentina) Lito Álvarez (United States) Jeff Austin	1	3
(United States) Cliff Richey (Ecuador) Pancho Segura
(United States) Steve Cornell (United States) Ronald Cornell
7	(United States) Arthur Ashe (Spain) Andrés Gimeno	6	6	6
(Mexico) Joaquín Loyo-Mayo (Jamaica) Richard Russell	3	8	4
(France) Pierre Barthès (Socialist Federal Republic of Yugoslavia) Nikola Pilić	6	6
(Ecuador) Pancho J. F. Guzman (Chile) Jaime Pinto Bravo	4	4

Second Round
1	(Australia) John Newcombe (Australia) Tony Roche	4	4
(Australia) Owen Davidson (United Kingdom) Roger Taylor	6	6
(Chile) Jaime Fillol (Chile) Heinz Gildemeister	9	8
(United States) Jim McManus (United States) Jim Osborne	7	10
3	(Australia) Ken Rosewall (Australia) Fred Stolle	w/o
(United States) Cliff Richey (Ecuador) Pancho Segura
7	(United States) Arthur Ashe (Spain) Andrés Gimeno	6	6
(France) Pierre Barthès (Socialist Federal Republic of Yugoslavia) Nikola Pilić	1	3

Quarterfinals
(Australia) Owen Davidson (United Kingdom) Roger Taylor	4	5
(United States) Jim McManus (United States) Jim Osborne	6	7
3	(Australia) Ken Rosewall (Australia) Fred Stolle	6	2
7	(United States) Arthur Ashe (Spain) Andrés Gimeno	8	6

Semifinals
(United States) Jim McManus (United States) Jim Osborne	6	6
7	(United States) Arthur Ashe (Spain) Andrés Gimeno	3	4

=== Bottom half ===
First Round
(United States) John Fort (United States) Jerry Van Linge	1	4
(United States) Roy Barth (United States) Steve Tidball	6	6
(United States) Alex Olmedo (Australia) Ray Ruffels	7	6	7
5	(United States) Bob Lutz (United States) Stan Smith	9	3	5
(United States) Dick Dell (United States) Dick Leach	14	2
(Australia) Dick Crealy (Brazil) Thomaz Koch	16	6
(United Kingdom) Gerald Battrick (United Kingdom) Peter Curtis	6	1	4
4	(Netherlands) Tom Okker (United States) Marty Riessen	3	6	6
(United States) Mike Franks (United States) Allen Fox	6	2
(Australia) Terry Addison (Australia) Ray Keldie	8	6
(United States) Tom Edlefsen (United States) Tom Gorman	9	4
6	(United States) Charlie Pasarell (United States) Dennis Ralston	11	6
Unknown; Unknown	0	1
(United States) Pancho Gonzales (United States) Ronald Holmberg	6	6
(Brazil) Fernando Gentil (United States) George Taylor
2	(Australia) Roy Emerson (Australia) Rod Laver

Second Round
(United States) Roy Barth (United States) Steve Tidball
(United States) Alex Olmedo (Australia) Ray Ruffels	w/o
(Australia) Dick Crealy (Brazil) Thomaz Koch	w/o
4	(Netherlands) Tom Okker (United States) Marty Riessen
(Australia) Terry Addison (Australia) Ray Keldie	11	4
6	(United States) Charlie Pasarell (United States) Dennis Ralston	13	6
(United States) Pancho Gonzales (United States) Ronald Holmberg	7	13
2	(Australia) Roy Emerson (Australia) Rod Laver	5	11

Quarterfinals
(United States) Alex Olmedo (Australia) Ray Ruffels	4	0
(Australia) Dick Crealy (Brazil) Thomaz Koch	6	6
6	(United States) Charlie Pasarell (United States) Dennis Ralston	6	8
(United States) Pancho Gonzales (United States) Ronald Holmberg	8	10

Semifinals
(Australia) Dick Crealy (Brazil) Thomaz Koch	2	4
(United States) Pancho Gonzales (United States) Ronald Holmberg	6	6
