= 1970 Pacific Southwest Open =

- Date: September 21–27
- Edition: 44th
- Category: Grand Prix
- Draw: 64S / 32D
- Prize money: $60,000
- Surface: Hard / outdoor
- Location: Los Angeles, California, U.S.
- Venue: Los Angeles Tennis Club

Champions

Men's singles
- (Australia) Rod Laver

Women's singles
- (United States) Sharon Walsh

Men's doubles
- (Netherlands) Tom Okker / (United States) Marty Riessen

Women's doubles
- (United States) Janet Newberry / (United States) Sharon Walsh
← 1969 ·	Pacific Southwest Open	· 1971 →

The 1970 Pacific Southwest Open was a combined men's and women's tennis tournament played on outdoor hard courts at the Los Angeles Tennis Club in Los Angeles, California in the United States. The men's tournament was part of the Grand Prix tennis circuit. It was the 44th edition of the tournament and ran from September 21 through September 27, 1970. Rod Laver and Sharon Walsh won the singles titles.

== Finals ==
=== Men's singles ===
(Australia) Rod Laver defeated (Australia) John Newcombe 4–6, 6–4, 7–6^{(7–5)}

=== Women's singles ===
(United States) Sharon Walsh defeated (Australia) Lesley Hunt 6–3, 6–2

=== Men's doubles ===
(Netherlands) Tom Okker / (United States) Marty Riessen defeated (United States) Bob Lutz / (United States) Stan Smith 7–6, 6–2

=== Women's doubles ===
(United States) Janet Newberry / (United States) Sharon Walsh defeated (South Africa) Esmé Emmanuel / (United States) Cecilia Martinez 6–3, 6–4
