= WSOS =

WSOS may refer to:

== Callsigns ==
Station SOS in region W:

- WSOS (AM), a radio station (1170 AM) licensed to St. Augustine Beach, Florida, United States
- WSOS-FM, a radio station (94.1 FM) licensed to Fruit Cove, Florida, United States

== Other uses ==
- Wildlife SOS, a conservation non-profit in India

== See also ==
- WSO (disambiguation) for the singular of WSOs
- KSOS, station SOS in region K
- SOS (disambiguation)
