= 1969 Pacific Southwest Open =

- Date: September 22–28
- Edition: 43rd
- Draw: 64S / 32D
- Prize money: $30,000
- Surface: Hard / outdoor
- Location: Los Angeles, California, U.S.
- Venue: Los Angeles Tennis Center

Champions

Men's singles
- (United States) Pancho Gonzales

Women's singles
- (United States) Billie Jean King

Men's doubles
- (United States) Pancho Gonzales / (United States) Ron Holmberg

Women's doubles
- (United States) Billie Jean King / (United States) Rosie Casals
← 1968 ·	Pacific Southwest Open	· 1970 →

The 1969 Pacific Southwest Open was a combined men's and women's tennis tournament played on outdoor hard courts at the Los Angeles Tennis Center in Los Angeles, California in the United States. The men's tournament was part of the Grand Prix tennis circuit. It was the 43rd edition of the tournament, the second in the open era, and ran from September 22 through September 28, 1969. Pancho Gonzales, aged 41, won the men's singles title, 20 years after winning it for the first time, and collected $4,000 first-prize money while Billie Jean King earned $1,500 for her singles title.

== Finals ==
=== Men's singles ===
(United States) Pancho Gonzales defeated (United States) Cliff Richey 6–0, 7–5

=== Women's singles ===
(United States) Billie Jean King defeated (United Kingdom) Ann Jones 6–2, 6–3

=== Men's doubles ===
(United States) Pancho Gonzales / (United States) Ron Holmberg defeated (United States) Jim McManus / (United States) Jim Osborne 6–3, 6–4

=== Women's doubles ===
(United States) Billie Jean King / (United States) Rosie Casals defeated (France) Françoise Dürr / (United Kingdom) Ann Jones 6–8, 8–6, 11–9
