= U.S. Pro Tennis Championships draws, 1946–1967 =

The U.S. Pro Tennis Championships were played each year from 1927 to 1999 (except 1944). Up to 1967, before the start of the "Open Era", this tournament was regarded as part of the professional grand slam. In 1963 the tournament failed financially but was revived in Boston without a break.

After World War II Bobby Riggs, Pancho Segura and Pancho Gonzales won the Championships multiple times. Into the 1960s, the most frequent winners were Rod Laver and Ken Rosewall.

== 1946 ==
Round of 16
(United States) Bobby Riggs	6	6	6
(United States) Jack March	2	3	3
(United States) John Faunce	6	9	6
(United States) Jack Jossi	4	7	1
(United States) Wayne Sabin	4	7	6	6	6
(United States) Bill Tilden	6	9	1	1	0
(United Kingdom) Fred Perry	6	6	6
(United States) Frank Goeltz	2	3	2
(United States) Welby Van Horn	6	6	4	6
(United States) John Nogrady	3	3	6	0
(United States) Frank Kovacs	10	4	11	10
(United States) Vincent Richards	8	6	9	8
(United States) Carl Earn	7	6	4	6
(United States) Gene Mako	5	4	6	3
(United States) Don Budge	6	6	6
(United States) John Howard	0	2	4

Quarterfinals
(United States) Bobby Riggs	6	9	6	6
(United States) John Faunce	1	11	3	3
(United States) Wayne Sabin	7	7	7
(United Kingdom) Fred Perry	5	5	5
(United States) Welby Van Horn	6	6	3	6	4
(United States) Frank Kovacs	1	1	6	8	6
(United States) Carl Earn	4	3	1
(United States) Don Budge	6	6	6

Semifinals
(United States) Bobby Riggs	6	6	6
(United States) Wayne Sabin	1	3	4
(United States) Frank Kovacs	8	2	2
(United States) Don Budge	10	6	6

Final
(United States) Bobby Riggs	6	6	6
(United States) Don Budge	3	1	1

== 1947 ==
Round of 16
(United States) Don Budge	6	6	6
(United States) Jimmy Adler	1	0	1
(United States) Wayne Sabin	7	6	6
(United States) Al Doyle	5	2	2
(United Kingdom) Fred Perry	6	6	6
(United States) John Nogrady	3	1	4
(United States) Welby Van Horn	6	6	6
(United States) William C. Crosby	3	4	4
(United States) Bobby Riggs	6	6	6
(United States) Martin Buxby	1	1	1
(United States) Elwood Cooke	6	6	6
(United States) Jack Jossi	2	1	2
(United States) Frank Kovacs	6	6	6
(United States) Jack March	2	3	2
(United States) John Faunce	6	6	6
(United States) Robert Stubbs	2	2	4

Quarterfinals
(United States) Don Budge	6	6	6
(United States) Wayne Sabin	2	3	4
(United Kingdom) Fred Perry	12	2	4
(United States) Welby Van Horn	14	6	6
(United States) Bobby Riggs	6	6	6
(United States) Elwood Cooke	4	1	2
(United States) Frank Kovacs	6	6	6
(United States) John Faunce	2	2	2

Semifinals
(United States) Don Budge	7	6	4	6
(United States) Welby Van Horn	5	3	6	3
(United States) Bobby Riggs	6	6	6
(United States) Frank Kovacs	3	3	4

Final
(United States) Don Budge	6	3	8	6	3
(United States) Bobby Riggs	3	6	10	4	6

== 1948 ==
Round of 16
(United States) Bobby Riggs	6	6	6
(United States) Richard Van den Bosch	0	1	3
(United States) Elwood Cooke	12	4	6	10
(France) Pierre Pellizza	10	6	1	8
(United States) Frank Kovacs	6	6	6
(United States) Robert Harman	3	2	0
(Ecuador) Pancho Segura	6	6	6
(United States) Carl Earn	4	0	3
(United States) Jack Kramer	6	6	6
(United States) Robert Stubbs	1	0	2
(United States) Welby Van Horn	6	3	6	6
(United States) John Nogrady	1	6	1	1
(United States) Don Budge	6	6	6
(United States) Jimmy Adler	0	0	1
(Australia) Dinny Pails	3	6	6	6
(United States) Wayne Sabin	6	3	3	4

Quarterfinals
(United States) Bobby Riggs	6	4	6	6
(United States) Elwood Cooke	4	6	3	0
(United States) Frank Kovacs	3	3	6	6	6
(Ecuador) Pancho Segura	6	6	4	3	3
(United States) Jack Kramer	3	16	4	8	6
(United States) Welby Van Horn	6	14	6	6	4
(United States) Don Budge	4	6	6	6
(Australia) Dinny Pails	6	2	3	3

Semifinals
(United States) Bobby Riggs	6	6	7
(United States) Frank Kovacs	3	2	5
(United States) Jack Kramer	6	8	3	6	6
(United States) Don Budge	4	10	6	4	0

Final
(United States) Bobby Riggs	12	2	6	3
(United States) Jack Kramer	14	6	3	6

== 1949 ==
Round of 16
(United States) Bobby Riggs	6	6	5	6
(Hawaii) John H. Cushingham	1	4	7	3
(United States) Jimmy Evert	6	6	6
(United States) Wayne Sabin	3	3	3
(United States) Welby Van Horn	6	7	9
(United States) William C. Crosby	3	5	7
(United States) Carl Earn	6	7	6
(United States) John Faunce	4	5	1
(United States) Don Budge	6	6	6
(United States) Joseph Fishbach	1	1	1
(United States) Elwood Cooke	9	9	9
(United States) Mitch Gornto	7	7	7
(United States) Frank Kovacs	6	6	6
(United States) Frank Goeltz	1	0	4
(United States) John Nogrady	10	3	6	6
(France) Pierre Pellizza	8	6	0	3

Quarterfinals
(United States) Bobby Riggs	12	6	6
(United States) Jimmy Evert	10	3	2
(United States) Welby Van Horn	6	3	6	6
(United States) Carl Earn	4	6	3	2
(United States) Don Budge	6	6	6
(United States) Elwood Cooke	3	2	2
(United States) Frank Kovacs	6	6	1	6
(United States) John Nogrady	2	4	6	4

Semifinals
(United States) Bobby Riggs	6	7	6	6
(United States) Welby Van Horn	8	5	3	3
(United States) Don Budge	2	7	6	6
(United States) Frank Kovacs	6	5	4	4

Final
(United States) Bobby Riggs	9	3	6	7
(United States) Don Budge	7	6	3	5

== 1950 ==
Round of 16
(United States) Jack Kramer	6	6
(United States) Jimmy Evert	4	2
(United States) Carl Earn	6	6
(United States) Al Doyle	3	2
(Ecuador) Pancho Segura	6	6
(United States) John Nogrady	2	2
(United States) Welby Van Horn	6	3	6
(United States) Joe Whalen	2	6	2
(United States) Bobby Riggs	6	8
(France) Pierre Pellizza	1	6
(United States) Jack March	6	1	6
(United States) Gene Mako	2	6	3
(United States) Frank Parker	6	6
(United States) John Faunce	2	3
(United States) Frank Kovacs	6	6
(United States) Joe Fishbach	1	0

Quarterfinals
(United States) Jack Kramer	6	6	6
(United States) Carl Earn	1	2	3
(Ecuador) Pancho Segura	6	6	6
(United States) Welby Van Horn	0	2	2
(United States) Bobby Riggs	6	6	7
(United States) Jack March	4	1	5
(United States) Frank Parker	0	0	1
(United States) Frank Kovacs	6	6	6

Semifinals
(United States) Jack Kramer	4	10	6	4	3
(Ecuador) Pancho Segura	6	8	1	6	6
(United States) Bobby Riggs	2	3	7	5
(United States) Frank Kovacs	6	6	5	7

Final
(Ecuador) Pancho Segura	6	1	8	4
(United States) Frank Kovacs	1	6	6	4	rtd.

== 1951 ==
=== Cleveland ===
Round of 16
(United States) Frank Kovacs	6	6
(United States) Martin Buxby	0	2
(United States) Bill Tilden	7	6
(United States) Wayne Sabin	5	3
(Romania) Vinny Rurac	6	7
(United States) Jack March	2	5
(United States) Don Budge	6	6
(United States) Al Doyle	4	3
(United States) Carl Earn	6	6
R. McFarland	3	1
(United States) Frank Parker	8	6
R. Rogers	6	0
(United States) Elwood Cooke	6	6
(Republic of Ireland) George Lyttleton-Rogers	1	1
(Ecuador) Pancho Segura	6	6
(United States) George Richey	3	3

Quarterfinals
(United States) Frank Kovacs	6	6	6
(United States) Bill Tilden	4	3	3
(Romania) Vinny Rurac	2	1	5
(United States) Don Budge	6	6	6
(United States) Carl Earn	6	9	6
(United States) Frank Parker	2	7	3
(United States) Elwood Cooke	1	1	4
(Ecuador) Pancho Segura	6	6	6

Semifinals
(United States) Frank Kovacs	19	6	6
(United States) Don Budge	17	2	1
(United States) Carl Earn	6	3	2	2
(Ecuador) Pancho Segura	3	6	6	6

Final
(United States) Frank Kovacs	6	3	6	1	9
(Ecuador) Pancho Segura	2	6	3	6	7

=== Forest Hills ===
Round robin		W–L	(Ecuador) Pancho Segura	(United States) Pancho Gonzales	(United States) Bobby Riggs	(United States) Welby Van Horn	(United States) Frank Parker	(United States) Jack Kramer
1.	(Ecuador) Pancho Segura	4–0		6–3, 6–4, 6–2	6–0, 8–6, 6–1	6–1, 6–2, 6–4	6–2, 6–2, 6–0	
2.	(United States) Pancho Gonzales	3–1	3–6, 4–6, 2–6		6–3, 4–6, 6–2, 6–3	6–3, 8–6, 6–0	4–6, 6–1, 7–5, 6–2	
3.	(United States) Bobby Riggs	2–2	0–6, 6–8, 1–6	3–6, 6–4, 2–6, 3–6		6–3, 8–10, 4–6, 6–4, 6–4	6–3, 17–15, 6–2	
4.	(United States) Welby Van Horn	1–3	1–6, 2–6, 4–6	3–6, 6–8, 0–6	3–6, 10–8, 6–4, 4–6, 4–6		3–6, 6–3, 3–6, 10–8, 6–2	
5.	(United States) Frank Parker	0–5	2–6, 2–6, 0–6	6–4, 1–6, 5–7, 2–6	3–6, 15–17, 2–6	6–3, 3–6, 6–3, 8–10, 2–6		6–4, 0–6, 6–4, 0–6, 3–6
6.	(United States) Jack Kramer^{1}	1–0					4–6, 6–0, 4–6, 6–0, 6–3	

^{1} withdrew due to injury.

== 1952 ==
Round of 16
(United States) Pancho Gonzales	6	6
(United States) Frank Rerlcha	0	2
(United States) John Howard	3	7	6
(United States) Jerry Evert	6	5	4
(United States) Frank Kovacs	6	6
(United States) Vic Braden	3	2
(United States) Jack March	6	8
(United States) Ed Burke	3	6
(Ecuador) Pancho Segura	6	6
(United States) Jim Hendrix	2	2
(United States) Al Doyle	6	6
(United States) Tom Burke	4	2
(United States) Don Budge	6	6
(United States) Henry Kenny	1	2
(United States) Jack Rodgers	6	2	6
(United States) George Richey	4	6	3

Quarterfinals
(United States) Pancho Gonzales	6	8	6
(United States) John Howard	0	10	0
(United States) Frank Kovacs	6	7
(United States) Jack March	2	5
(Ecuador) Pancho Segura	6	6
(United States) Al Doyle	2	0
(United States) Don Budge	6	6
(United States) Jack Rodgers	3	2

Semifinals
(United States) Pancho Gonzales	6	6	6
(United States) Frank Kovacs	3	3	3
(Ecuador) Pancho Segura	6	6	6
(United States) Don Budge	0	3	2

Final
(United States) Pancho Gonzales	6	4	6	4	0
(Ecuador) Pancho Segura	3	6	3	6	6

== 1953 ==
Round of 16
(United States) Jack Rodgers	8	6
Jerry Evert	6	2
(United States) Bobby Riggs	9	6
(United States) Vic Braden	7	2
(United States) Carl Earn	6	6
J. Morton	3	1
(United States) Al Doyle	4	6	6
(United States) George Richey	6	4	1
(United States) Robert Rodgers	3	6	6
D. Martin	6	4	4
(United States) Don Budge	w/o
(United States) Joe Whalen

Quarterfinals
(United States) Pancho Gonzales	6	6
(United States) Jack Rodgers	3	4
(United States) Bobby Riggs	6	6
(United States) Carl Earn	2	4
(United States) Frank Kovacs	6	6
(United States) Al Doyle	2	4
(United States) Robert Rodgers	4	3
(United States) Don Budge	6	6

Semifinals
(United States) Pancho Gonzales	6	6
(United States) Bobby Riggs	3	2
(United States) Frank Kovacs	9	4
(United States) Don Budge	11	6

Final
(United States) Pancho Gonzales	4	6	7	6
(United States) Don Budge	6	4	5	2

== 1954 ==
- Note – Sources vary as to which event was the U.S. Pro in 1954. At the time, Los Angeles had the semi-official title.

=== Cleveland ===
Round of 16
(United States) Carl Earn	6	6
(United States) Elwood Cooke	1	4
(United States) Don Budge	6	6
(United States) Bobby Riggs	4	4
(Australia) Frank Sedgman	6	6
(United States) Vic Braden	0	1
(United States) Frank Kovacs	6	6
(United States) Thomas Burke	3	3

Quarterfinals
(United States) Pancho Gonzales	6	6
(United States) Al Doyle	1	2
(United States) Carl Earn	6	5	2
(United States) Don Budge	3	7	6
(Australia) Frank Sedgman	6	6
(United States) Frank Kovacs	1	4
(United States) Jack Rodgers	0	2
(Ecuador) Pancho Segura	6	6

Semifinals
(United States) Pancho Gonzales	6	6	6
(United States) Don Budge	2	3	4
(Australia) Frank Sedgman	6	7	2	6
(Ecuador) Pancho Segura	2	5	6	4

Final
(United States) Pancho Gonzales	6	9	3	6
(Australia) Frank Sedgman	3	7	6	2

=== Los Angeles ===
Round of 16
(United States) Pancho Gonzales	6	8
(United States) Robert Harman	4	6
(United States) Gene Mako	6	6
(United States) Jack Jossi	1	4
(United States) Samuel Match	6	6
(United States) Wayne Sabin	1	2
(Australia) Frank Sedgman	6	6
(France) Pierre Pallizza	0	1
(United States) Carl Earn	6	6
(United States) Walter Wesbrook	2	2
(United States) Bob Rogers	6	6
(United States) George Toley	3	4
(Romania) Constantin Tanacescu	6	6
(United States) John Faunce	3	4
(United States) Ben Gorchakoff	0	2
(Ecuador) Pancho Segura	6	6

Quarterfinals
(United States) Pancho Gonzales	6	6
(United States) Gene Mako	0	3
(United States) Samuel Match	3	2
(Australia) Frank Sedgman	6	6
(United States) Carl Earn	6	6
(United States) Bob Rogers	1	3
(Romania) Constantin Tanacescu	0	1
(Ecuador) Pancho Segura	6	6

Semifinals
(United States) Pancho Gonzales	6	6	6
(Australia) Frank Sedgman	4	4	4
(United States) Carl Earn	2	3	1
(Ecuador) Pancho Segura	6	6	6

Final
(United States) Pancho Gonzales	6	4	2	6	6
(Ecuador) Pancho Segura	4	6	6	2	4

== 1955 ==
Round of 16
(United States) Frank Parker	21	21
(United States) John Faunce	13	17
(United States) Bobby Riggs	21	21
(United States) Martin Buxby	17	19
(United States) Carl Earn	21	21
Vinnie Rurac	15	12
(United Kingdom) Fred Perry	21	18	21
(United States) Al Doyle	15	21	12

Quarterfinals
(United States) Pancho Gonzales	21	21
(United States) Frank Parker	15	13
(United States) Frank Kovacs	21	21
(United States) Bobby Riggs	15	13
(United States) Don Budge	20	21	12
(United States) Carl Earn	22	13	21
(Ecuador) Pancho Segura	21	21
(United Kingdom) Fred Perry	12	10

Semifinals
(United States) Pancho Gonzales	21	13	22
(United States) Frank Kovacs	18	21	20
(United States) Carl Earn	15	17
(Ecuador) Pancho Segura	21	21

Final
(United States) Pancho Gonzales	21	19	21	20	21
(Ecuador) Pancho Segura	16	21	8	22	19

== 1956 ==
Quarterfinals
(Ecuador) Pancho Segura	21	21	21
(United States) Gene Garrett	13	8	10
(United States) Tony Trabert	21	21	21
(United States) Carl Earn	11	17	7
(United States) Pancho Gonzales	21	21	33
(United States) Frank Parker	16	17	31
(Australia) Rex Hartwig	21	21	21
(United States) Frank Kovacs	10	13	16

Semifinals
(Ecuador) Pancho Segura	21	21	21
(United States) Tony Trabert	13	10	16
(United States) Pancho Gonzales	23	21	21
(Australia) Rex Hartwig	21	18	18

Final
(Ecuador) Pancho Segura	15	21	14	20
(United States) Pancho Gonzales	21	13	21	22

== 1957 ==
Quarterfinals
(United States) Pancho Gonzales	6	6
(United States) Frank Parker	2	3
(United States) Tony Trabert	6	9
(United States) Frank Kovacs	3	7
(Australia) Ken Rosewall	6	6
(United States) Bobby Riggs	2	2
(Ecuador) Pancho Segura	8	6
(Australia) Dinny Pails	6	4

Semifinals
(United States) Pancho Gonzales	3	11	8
(United States) Tony Trabert	6	9	6
(Australia) Ken Rosewall	2	3
(Ecuador) Pancho Segura	6	6

Final
(United States) Pancho Gonzales	6	3	7	6
(Ecuador) Pancho Segura	3	6	5	1

== 1958 ==
Quarterfinals
(United States) Pancho Gonzales	6	7
(Brazil) Armando Vieira	3	5
(Ecuador) Pancho Segura	6	6
(United States) Al Doyle	1	3
(Australia) Lew Hoad	5	6	6
(United States) Frank Parker	7	2	4
(United States) Tony Trabert	6	6
(United States) Bobby Riggs	3	1

Semifinals
(United States) Pancho Gonzales	6	6
(Ecuador) Pancho Segura	4	3
(Australia) Lew Hoad	6	13
(United States) Tony Trabert	2	11

Final
(United States) Pancho Gonzales	3	4	14	6	6
(Australia) Lew Hoad	6	6	12	1	4

== 1959 ==
Quarterfinals
(United States) Pancho Gonzales	6	6
(United States) Jerry DeWitts	3	1
(Australia) Ashley Cooper	6	6
(United States) Frank Parker	4	2
(Ecuador) Pancho Segura	6	6
(Australia) Malcolm Anderson	0	3
(Australia) Lew Hoad	6	6
(United States) Bobby Riggs	2	3

Semifinals
(United States) Pancho Gonzales	6	3	6
(Australia) Ashley Cooper	3	6	3
(Ecuador) Pancho Segura	6	2
(Australia) Lew Hoad	8	6

Final
(United States) Pancho Gonzales	6	6	6
(Australia) Lew Hoad	4	2	4

== 1960 ==
Quarterfinals
(United States) Tony Trabert	6	6
(United States) Frank Parker	0	2
(Peru) Alex Olmedo	4	6	6
(United States) Sam Giammalva	6	3	1

Semifinals
(United States) Tony Trabert	4	6	6
(Ecuador) Pancho Segura	6	4	4
(Peru) Alex Olmedo	6	7
(Australia) Ashley Cooper	4	5

Final
(United States) Tony Trabert	5	4
(Peru) Alex Olmedo	7	6

== 1961 ==
First round
(Brazil) Armando Vieira	6
(United States) Al Doyle	3
(United States) Sam Giammalva	w/o
(Australia) Jack Arkinstall

Second round
(United States) Frank Parker	6
(Brazil) Armando Vieira	3
(United States) Sam Giammalva	8
(United States) Bobby Riggs	6

Third round
(Spain) Andrés Gimeno	6
(United States) Frank Parker	0
(United States) Sam Giammalva	2
(United States) Barry MacKay (tennis)	6

Semifinal
(United States) Pancho Gonzales	6	6
(Spain) Andrés Gimeno	4	3
(United States) Barry MacKay (tennis)	4	9
(Australia) Frank Sedgman	6	11

Final
(United States) Pancho Gonzales	6	7
(Australia) Frank Sedgman	3	5

== 1962 ==
Semifinals
(United States) Earl Buchholz	6	6
(Australia) Jack Arkinstall	2	4
(Ecuador) Pancho Segura	6	7	11
(United States) Barry MacKay (tennis)	4	9	9

Final
(United States) Earl Buchholz	6	6	6
(Ecuador) Pancho Segura	4	3	4

== 1963 ==
Quarterfinals
(Australia) Rod Laver	6	1	6	6
(Ecuador) Pancho Segura	2	6	2	3
(United States) Earl Buchholz	6	6	6
(Australia) Lew Hoad	4	1	2
(Peru) Alex Olmedo	10	2	6	6
(United States) Pancho Gonzales	8	6	0	1
(Australia) Ken Rosewall	6	6	6
(United States) Tony Trabert	2	2	2

Semifinals
(Australia) Rod Laver	5	6	6	6
(United States) Earl Buchholz	7	4	4	3
(Peru) Alex Olmedo	3	3	9
(Australia) Ken Rosewall	6	6	11

Final
(Australia) Rod Laver	4	2	2
(Australia) Ken Rosewall	6	6	6

== 1964 ==
Round of 16
(Australia) Lew Hoad	6	0	6
(United Kingdom) Mike Davies	4	6	4
(United States) Earl Buchholz	6	6
(Chile) Luis Ayala	4	2
(Peru) Alex Olmedo	12	7	6
(United States) Sam Giammalva	14	5	2
(Ecuador) Pancho Segura	9	6
(United States) Barry MacKay (tennis)	7	1

Quarterfinals
(Australia) Ken Rosewall	6	6	10
(Australia) Lew Hoad	8	3	8
(Australia) Rod Laver	4	9	6
(United States) Earl Buchholz	6	7	1
(Spain) Andrés Gimeno	6	6
(Peru) Alex Olmedo	3	3
(United States) Pancho Gonzales	6	6
(Ecuador) Pancho Segura	4	2

Semifinals
(Australia) Ken Rosewall	3	6	3	2
(Australia) Rod Laver	6	3	6	6
(Spain) Andrés Gimeno	3	3	6
(United States) Pancho Gonzales	6	6	8

Final
(Australia) Rod Laver	4	6	7	6
(United States) Pancho Gonzales	6	3	5	4

== 1965 ==
Round of 16
(Chile) Luis Ayala	6	3	7
(Australia) Frank Sedgman	4	6	5
(United States) Barry MacKay (tennis)	6	6
(United States) Sam Giammalva	4	4
(Australia) Malcolm Anderson	9	6
(Peru) Alex Olmedo	7	4
(Ecuador) Pancho Segura	7	6
(United Kingdom) Mike Davies	5	3

Quarterfinals
(United States) Earl Buchholz	6	6
(Chile) Luis Ayala	3	2
(Australia) Rod Laver	6	6
(United States) Barry MacKay (tennis)	3	2
(Australia) Ken Rosewall	6	10	6
(Australia) Malcolm Anderson	1	12	4
(United States) Pancho Gonzales	6	6
(Ecuador) Pancho Segura	3	3

Semifinals
(United States) Earl Buchholz	9	5	4	3
(Australia) Rod Laver	7	7	6	6
(Australia) Ken Rosewall	6	6	6
(United States) Pancho Gonzales	3	2	4

Final
(Australia) Rod Laver	4	3	3
(Australia) Ken Rosewall	6	6	6

== 1966 ==
Round of 16
(Australia) Lew Hoad	6	6
(Ecuador) Pancho Segura	2	3
(United Kingdom) Mike Davies	6	10	6
(United States) Barry MacKay (tennis)	4	12	4
(Chile) Luis Ayala	9	4	6
(France) Pierre Barthès	7	6	4
(Australia) Malcolm Anderson	6	6
(United States) Sam Giammalva	2	1

Quarterfinals
(Spain) Andrés Gimeno	6	6
(Australia) Lew Hoad	4	3
(Australia) Rod Laver	6	6
(United Kingdom) Mike Davies	3	4
(United States) Earl Buchholz	6	6
(Chile) Luis Ayala	4	4
(Australia) Ken Rosewall	8	6
(Australia) Malcolm Anderson	6	4

Semifinals
(Spain) Andrés Gimeno	3	3	5
(Australia) Rod Laver	6	6	7
(United States) Earl Buchholz	0	3	2
(Australia) Ken Rosewall	6	6	6

Final
(Australia) Rod Laver	6	4	6	8	6
(Australia) Ken Rosewall	4	6	2	10	3

== 1967 ==
Round of 16
(Australia) Ken Rosewall	7	6	6
(Australia) Malcolm Anderson	5	8	3
(United Kingdom) Mike Davies	6	9	11
(France) Pierre Barthès	1	11	9
(United States) Dennis Ralston	6	6
(United States) Earl Buchholz	2	3
(Australia) Fred Stolle	6	6
(United States) Barry MacKay (tennis)	3	4
(Chile) Luis Ayala	1	6	16
(United States) Sam Giammalva	6	1	14
(Australia) Rod Laver	6	6
(Peru) Alex Olmedo	1	2

Quarterfinals
(Australia) Ken Rosewall	6	6
(United Kingdom) Mike Davies	0	2
(Ecuador) Pancho Segura	3	3
(Spain) Andrés Gimeno	6	6
(United States) Dennis Ralston	7	3	5
(Australia) Fred Stolle	5	6	7
(Chile) Luis Ayala	1	2
(Australia) Rod Laver	6	6

Semifinals
(Australia) Ken Rosewall	5	2
(Spain) Andrés Gimeno	7	6
(Australia) Fred Stolle	6	2	3
(Australia) Rod Laver	4	6	6

Final
(Spain) Andrés Gimeno	6	4	3	5
(Australia) Rod Laver	4	6	6	7

== See also ==
- U.S. Pro Tennis Championships draws, 1927–1945
- French Pro Championship draws
- Wembley Professional Championships draws
