= Florida Pro Championships =

Defunct tennis tournament
- Tour: Pro Tennis Tour; National Tennis League
- Founded: 1932; 94 years ago
- Abolished: 1966; 60 years ago
- Location: Daytona Beach; Ft. Lauderdale; Hollywood; Miami; Miami Beach; Marco Island
- Surface: Clay / outdoor

The Florida Pro Championships was a professional tennis tournament first held in 1932. The tournament was part of Pro Tennis Tour from inception. It was played in various locations in Florida, United States until 1972.

== History ==
The Florida Professional Championships were first held in February 1932 in Miami Beach, Florida. The inaugural winner of this Round Robin Event was German player Hans Nüsslein who won 3 out 3 matches, American player Bill Tilden was placed second with a 2-1 match record. The tournament was not held on a semi permanent basis, until the early 1960s. The event was held in various locations including Daytona Beach, Ft. Lauderdale, Miami, Miami Beach. From 1961 it was mainly held in Hollywood, Florida. The 1972 the final edition was held in Marco Island, when it was branded as the Florida Professional Men's Tennis Championship.

== Finals ==
Year	Locations	Champions	Runners-up	Score
1932	Miami Beach	(Germany) Hans Nüsslein (1st)	(United States) Bill Tilden (2nd)	Round Robin.
1934	Miami	(Germany) Hans Nüsslein	(Czechoslovakia) Karel Koželuh	6–1, 6–4, 10–8.
1935	Miami	(Germany) Hans Nüsslein	(Czechoslovakia) Karel Koželuh	3–6, 6–3, 6–1, 6–1.
1942	Daytona Beach	(United States) Wayne Sabin	(United States) Dick Skeen	3–6, 6–3, 6–3, 6–0.
1953	Ft. Lauderdale	(United States) Bobby Riggs	(United States) Frank Kovacs	7–5, 6–4.
1954	Ft. Lauderdale	(United States) Frank Kovacs	(United States) Bobby Riggs	7–5, 2–6, 6–4.
1961	Hollywood	(United States) Allen Quay	(United States) Jerry Dewitt's	6–3, 7–5.
1962	Hollywood	(United States) Earl Baumgardner	(Brazil) Armando Vieira	8–10, 6–4, 6–4 ret.
1963	Hollywood	(United States) Sam Giammalva	(United States) Allen Quay	6–3, 4–6, 6–4.
1964	Hollywood	(United States) Pancho Gonzales	(United States) Bernard Bartzen	6–4, 8–6.
1966	Hollywood	(United States) Pancho Gonzales	(Australia) Warren Woodcock	6–2, 6–0.
1972	Marco Island	(United States) William Higgins	(United States) Tom Mozur	6–1 6–1.

== Event names ==
- Florida Professional Championships (1932)
- Florida Pro Championships (1934-1935, 1942, 1961–1966)
- Florida Pro Tennis Championships (1953-1954)
- Florida Professional Men's Tennis Championship (1972)
