= Dick Knight (tennis) =

American tennis player

- Born: May 15, 1948 (age 78); Los Angeles, California, United States
- Occupations: President, PRO Sports Club

Dick Knight (born May 15, 1948) attended Shoreline High School in Seattle, Washington where he was a high school tennis standout competing with and against other tennis great Tom Gorman. From 1966 to 1970 he attended the University of Washington where he was named Tennis Captain and the first U.W. NCAA Coaches All American. He was inducted into the Husky Hall of Fame in 1995 and the USTA Pacific Northwest Hall of Fame in 2015.

As a tennis player his career highlights include four years Washington State Open champion, five years ranked in the top 60 in the U.S. (1967–71), four years ranked number one in Pacific Northwest, and competitor in Wimbledon (1972) and three U.S. Open tournaments (1967, 1968, 1971) where he played such tennis greats a champion Arthur Ashe. One other notable moment in Knight’s career happened in a match against Mike Sprengelmeyer in Southampton, Long Island in 1967. The match lasted 5 ½ hours and 107 games which Dick eventually won 32–30, 3–6, 19–17. This lengthy duel was featured later that year in a Sports Illustrated article by George Plimpton titled "What the Deuce is Going On?"

In 1972 Knight signed on with Nike as the young company’s first worldwide tennis promotions manager. That same year, he signed on with the Seattle SuperSonics as tennis professional at the SuperSonics Racquet Club in Bellevue, Washington. In 1984, Knight and Dr. Mark Dedomenico founded Professional Recreation Organization, Inc. to purchase the club and changed the name to PRO Sports Club. Over the past 20(+) years as President of PRO Sports Club, the flagship Bellevue location has grown into a 500,000-square-foot (46,000 m^{2}) facility with over 40,000 members.

Currently Knight resides in Redmond, Washington with his wife Karen. He is a member of the Church of Jesus Christ of Latter-day Saints (LDS Church).
