= Jack March =

American tennis player

- Full name: John Lovell March
- Country (sports): United States
- Born: August 4, 1919; New York
- Died: May 20, 1993 (aged 73); Cleveland, Ohio

Jack March (August 4, 1919 – May 20, 1993) was an American tennis player and promoter best known for promoting the World Pro Championships from 1951 through 1964.

In the fall of 1939, March was already a teaching professional at the Hollywood Beach Hotel in Florida.

In July 1941 March and another player were arrested and charged with raping a 17-year-old girl. The charges were dismissed by a jury two months later.

March played in the U.S. Pro Tennis Championships from at least 1942 through 1950.

In 1958, March invited Robert Ryland to play in the World Pro Tennis Tournament in Cleveland, Ohio, establishing Ryland as the first black professional tennis player. Ryland was inducted into the Eastern Tennis Hall of Fame in 2002.

March married Mary Rand (Remington Rand family), and together they had five children (John March, James March, Mary March Kiewel, Christine March, Susan March Cotton).

He had 12 grandchildren and numerous great-grandchildren. He was the first cousin of amateur tennis player, Fred Krais Jr.
