= Carl Earn =

American tennis player

- Country (sports): United States
- Born: March 7, 1921 Los Angeles, California, United States
- Died: April 4, 2007 (aged 86) Los Angeles, California, United States
- Turned pro: 1946 (amateur tour from 1940)
- Retired: 1956
- Plays: Left-handed (1-handed backhand)

Singles
- Highest ranking: No. 7 (1946, PPA ranking)
- Professional majors
- US Pro: SF (1954, 1955)
- Wembley Pro: QF (1951)

Carl Earn (March 7, 1921 – April 4, 2007) was an American tennis player who competed on the amateur and professional circuits in the 1940s and 1950s. He reached as high as world No. 7 in the professional ranks in 1946.

== Biography ==
Earn grew up in Los Angeles, and was Jewish. He graduated from the Manual Arts High School in 1939. He played tennis at Compton Junior College. In 1940 he won the doubles at the Ojai Tennis Tournament with Walter Bugg. He joined the U.S. Navy at the start of World War II and served until 1945.

At the Pacific Southwest Championships in September 1945 he reached the semifinals, after a victory in the quarterfinal over U.S. Championships finalist Bill Talbert. Earn turned professional in early 1946, a year after being honorably discharged from the Navy, and joined Bill Tilden's Professional Players Association. He won his professional debut match against Bobby Riggs in Omaha. The left-hander reached as high as world No. 7 in the professional ranks (confirmed by Tilden) in 1946. He reached the quarter-finals of the 1950 U.S. Pro Championships, where he lost to Jack Kramer.

He was the head professional at the Beverly Hills' Hillcrest Country Club and the Beverly Hills Tennis Club.

Earn was inducted into the Southern California Tennis Hall of Fame in 2002, and the Southern California Jewish Sports Hall of Fame in 2004. The University of California, Los Angeles (UCLA) established a grant in his name in 2007 for student-athletes on their tennis team. He died at his home in Los Angeles.
