= Washington State Open =

Tournament information
- Tour: USTA Circuit
- Founded: 1890; 135 years ago
- Editions: 130
- Location: Seattle, Washington, United States
- Venue: Seattle TC
- Surface: Hard
- Prize money: $32,000 (combined)

The Washington State Open is a USTA affiliated hard court tennis tournament founded in 1890 as the Washington State Championships. The tournament is played at the Seattle Tennis Club, Seattle, Washington in the United States.
