= Pancho Gonzales =

American tennis player (1928–1995)

- Gonzales in 1957
- Full name: Ricardo Alonso González
- Country (sports): United States
- Born: May 9, 1928 Los Angeles, California, US
- Died: July 3, 1995 (aged 67) Las Vegas, Nevada, US
- Height: 6 ft 2 in (1.88 m)
- Turned pro: 1949 (1947 amateur)
- Retired: 1974
- Plays: Right-handed (one-handed backhand)
- Int. Tennis HoF: 1968 (member page)

Singles
- Career record: 1368–652 (67.7%)
- Career titles: 111
- Highest ranking: No. 1 (1948, Ned Potter)

Grand Slam singles results
- Australian Open: 3R (1969)
- French Open: SF (1949, 1968)
- Wimbledon: 4R (1949, 1969)
- US Open: W (1948, 1949)

Other tournaments
- Professional majors
- US Pro: W (1953, 1954, 1955, 1956, 1957, 1958, 1959, 1961)
- Wembley Pro: W (1950, 1951, 1952, 1956)
- French Pro: F (1956, 1961)
- Other pro events
- TOC: W (1957^{FH}, 1958^{FH})

Doubles
- Career record: 43–30

Grand Slam doubles results
- French Open: W (1949)
- Wimbledon: W (1949)

Grand Slam mixed doubles results
- Wimbledon: QF (1968)

Ricardo Alonso "Pancho" González (May 9, 1928 – July 3, 1995), known sometimes as Richard Gonzales, was an American tennis player. He won 15 major singles titles, including two U.S. National Championships in 1948 and 1949, and 13 Professional majors. He also won three Tournament of Champions professional events in 1957, 1958, and 1959. Gonzales was ranked as the amateur world No. 1 in 1948 by Ned Potter and in 1949 by Potter and John Olliff.

Gonzales was a prominent professional champion in the 1950s and 1960s, winning world professional championship tours between 1954 and 1961; he was the world number one ranked male tennis player professional between 1952 and 1961. Gonzales was a determined competitor with a fierce temper. He was often at odds with officials and promoters. However, he was a fan favorite who drew many spectators.

== Career ==
=== Amateur ===
Gonzales was given a 51-cent racquet by his mother when he was 12 years old. He received tennis analysis from his friend, Chuck Pate, but mostly taught himself to play by watching other players on the public courts at nearby Exposition Park in Los Angeles. Once he discovered tennis, he lost interest in school and began a troubled adolescence in which he was occasionally pursued by truant officers and police. He was befriended by Frank Poulain, the owner of the tennis shop at Exposition Park, and sometimes slept there.

Due to his lack of school attendance and occasional minor brushes with the law, he was ostracized by the tennis establishment of the 1940s. The headquarters for tennis activity was the Los Angeles Tennis Club, which actively trained other top players such as the youthful Jack Kramer. During that time, the head of the Southern California Tennis Association, and the most powerful man in California tennis was Perry T. Jones.

Jones, the head of California tennis, was described as an autocratic leader who embodied much of the exclusionary sensibilities that governed tennis for decades. Although Gonzales was a promising junior, once Jones discovered that the youth was truant from school, Jones banned him from playing tournaments.

Eventually he was arrested for burglary at age 15 and spent a year in detention. He then joined the Navy just as World War II was ending and served for two years, finally receiving a bad-conduct discharge in 1947.

1947

Despite his lack of playing time while in the Navy, and as a mostly unknown 19-year-old in 1947, Gonzales achieved a national ranking of No. 17 by playing primarily on the West Coast. He did, however, go East that year to play in the U.S. Championships at Forest Hills. He beat the British Davis Cup player Derek Barton and then lost a five-set match to third seed Gardnar Mulloy, despite leading 4–3 with a break in the fifth set. Following that, in the last major tournament of the year, the Pacific Southwest, played at the Los Angeles Tennis Club, he beat three players that would end their careers with Grand Slam singles titles, Jaroslav Drobný, Bob Falkenburg, and Frank Parker, before losing in the semifinals to Ted Schroeder.

1948

The following year, Perry T. Jones relented in his opposition to Gonzales and sponsored his trip East to play in the major tournaments. The top-ranked American player, Schroeder, decided at the last moment not to play in the U.S. Championships and Gonzales was seeded No. 8 in the tournament. To the surprise of most observers, he won it fairly easily by a straight-set victory over the South African Eric Sturgess in the finals with his powerful serve-and-volley game. As The New York Times story of that first win began, "The rankest outsider of modern times sits on the tennis throne." His persona at the time was strikingly different from what it would become in future years. American Lawn Tennis wrote that "the crowd cheered a handsome, dark-skinned Mexican-American youngster who smiled boyishly each time he captured a hard-fought point, kissed the ball prayerfully before a crucial serve, and was human enough to show nervousness as he powered his way to the most coveted crown in the world." This was Gonzales's only major tournament victory of the year, but it was enough to let him finish the year ranked as the number one American player. Gonzales was ranked world No. 1 amateur by Ned Potter.

1949

In 1949, Gonzales performed poorly at Wimbledon, where he was seeded second but lost in the fourth round to Geoff Brown, and was derided for his performance by some of the press. Gonzales was called a "cheese champion" and, because of his name, his doubles partner of the time, Frank Parker, began to call him "Gorgonzales", after gorgonzola. This was eventually shortened to "Gorgo", the nickname by which he was later known by his colleagues on the professional tour. (Jack Kramer, in his autobiography, says that it was Jim Burchard, the tennis writer for the New York World-Telegram who first called him a "cheese champ".)

When Gonzales returned to the United States Championships in 1949, he repeated his victory of the previous year. Schroeder, the top seed, had beaten Gonzales eight times in nine matches during their careers and was heavily favored. The only time he had beaten Schroeder, Gonzales was playing with a broken nose that he had suffered the previous day from his doubles partner's racquet during a point at the net. In a tremendous final that has been called the 11th greatest match of all time", Gonzales lost a 1-hour and 15-minute first set 16–18 but finally managed to prevail in the fifth set. Once again he finished the year as the number-one ranked U.S. amateur. Gonzales was ranked world No. 1 amateur by John Olliff and Ned Potter. Gonzales also won both his singles matches in the Davis Cup finals against Australia. Having beaten Schroeder at Forest Hills, Bobby Riggs, who had been counting on signing Schroeder to play Kramer on the professional tour, was then forced to reluctantly sign Gonzales instead.

=== Professional ===
1949–1950

Gonzales was beaten in his first year on the professional tour, 94 matches to 29, by the reigning king of professional tennis, Jack Kramer. During this time, Gonzales apparently changed from a friendly, happy-go-lucky youngster to the hard-bitten loner he became known as for the rest of his life. According to Kramer in his 1979 autobiography, "The worst thing that ever happened to Gonzales was winning Forest Hills in 1949... At a time when Gorgo wasn't mature as a player he was pitted against Kramer, an established pro at his peak." Moreover, says Kramer, "Pancho had no idea how to live or take care of himself. He was a hamburger-and-hot-dog guy to start with and had no concept of diet in training... On the court, Gorgo would swig Cokes through a match... Also, Gorgo was a pretty heavy cigarette smoker. He had terrible sleeping habits made even worse by the reality of a tour."

Life on the tour was not easy. Most of the matches were played indoors on the tour's portable canvas surface. "One night", Gonzales recalled later, "I sprained an ankle badly. The next night in another town I was hurting. I told Jack I couldn't play. He said to me, 'Kid, we always play.' Jack had a doctor shoot me up with novocaine, and we played. That's just the way it was. The size of the crowd didn't matter. They'd paid to see us play."

Kramer won 22 of the first 26 matches and 42 of the next 50. Gonzales improved enough to win 15 of the remaining 32 but it was too late. Bobby Riggs, the tour promoter, told Gonzales that he was now "dead meat": Kramer would need a new challenger for the next tour. As compensation, however, Gonzales had made US$75,000, well above his guarantee of $60,000, in his losing efforts. Kramer also said that "his nature had changed completely. He became difficult and arrogant. Losing had changed him. When he got his next chance, he understood that you either win or you're out of a job." He was now "a loner", said Ted Schroeder, "and always the unhappiest man in town."

One bright moment for Gonzales in his rookie year as a professional was winning the U.S. Pro Indoor Championship at Philadelphia in late March, defeating Kramer in the final in straight sets. Gonzales also won the tournament at Wembley, beating Don Budge and Welby Van Horn. He did not play in the 1950 U. S. Professional Championships in Cleveland, which were authorized by the USPLTA.

1951

From 1951 to 1953, Gonzales was in semi-retirement. He bought the tennis shop at Exposition Park and ran that while playing in short tours and occasional professional tournaments throughout the world. In spite of his infrequent play (because first Riggs, then Kramer, as promoters of the pro tour, did not offer him playing positions on the tours), he had nevertheless raised his game to a higher level than before and was winning most of his matches. Precise records of this time are difficult to locate but Gonzales asserts in his autobiography that after the decisive loss to Kramer in their 1949–50 tour he then beat his old foe 11 times in their next 16 matches.

In the southern hemisphere summer of 1950–51, Gonzales toured Australia and New Zealand with Dinny Pails, Frank Parker, and Don Budge. In December 1950, Pails won the short tour in New Zealand, but in January and February 1951 Gonzales won a second and longer tour in Australia. Gonzales lost the deciding match of the U.S. Professional Indoor Championships at Philadelphia in February 1951 to Kramer.

At the Philadelphia U.S. Pro Indoor in March, 1951, the service "drives" (not "forehand drives" as sometimes reported) of a number of players were electronically measured and compared to Tilden's reported service "drive" speed of 151 mph made by stopwatch and film in 1931. The service speeds were measured at the net, and not at the racquet face, as is currently the standard practice. Gonzales was recorded as hitting the fastest serve, 112.88 mph, followed by Kramer at 107.8, and Van Horn at 104. Kovacs, who possessed a big serve, played in the Philadelphia tournament but did not participate in the service-speed measurements. Segura and Riggs participated in the test, but their results were not reported.

Gonzales finished second to Segura in the 1951 U.S. Professional Championships at Forest Hills, organized by Riggs and Kramer, and authorized by the USPLTA. Gonzales did not play in the 1951 Cleveland International Professional title at Cleveland, won by Kovacs (and approved as the U.S. National Pro Championships by the Professional Players Association of Tennis, an organization formed that year and led by Budge). Though Gonzales won Wembley in 1951 (where Kramer was not entered), Segura was ranked the number one U.S. pro in the USPLTA rankings for 1951 and Kramer won the world series over Segura.

1952

In 1952 Gonzales reached the top level of the pros. In 1952, he won the Philadelphia Inquirer Masters tournament (where he beat both Segura and Kramer twice in a double round-robin event, and split his two matches with Kovacs); the World Professional hard court event at Los Angeles (beating Budge and Segura); at Scarborough, England (where he defeated Budge and Segura); at Wembley, England (where he beat Segura in the semis, and then, to beat Kramer in the final, came from down 2 sets to none, and from 4-1 down in the fifth set); at Berlin, (where Segura and Budge lost again to him); and in Geneva (beating Segura). Gonzales was a finalist at Cleveland, approved by the P.P.A.T. as the U.S. National Pro, where he lost again to Segura. 1952 was the first year that "Big Pancho" (Gonzales) had an edge in results over "Little Pancho" (Segura) in their head-to-head matches, and thereafter his edge in results over Segura continued throughout their long careers.

The USPLTA issued rankings at the end of 1952 in which they ranked Segura the U.S. pro No. 1, with Gonzales second (in 1951, when Kramer had beaten Segura 64 matches to 28 in their championship tour, they had ranked Segura as the U.S. No. 1 pro player due to Kramer's lack of success in the U.S.). The Tennis Hall of Fame gives Gonzales "Top ranking: World number 1 (1952)". The PPAT rankings for 1952 placed Segura as the U.S. No. 1 professional, followed by Gonzales as the U.S. No. 2.

1953

In 1953, Gonzales was omitted by Kramer (by now also a promoter) from the big pro tour, which featured Frank Sedgman (a winner of five Grand Slam singles titles) against Kramer himself and Ken McGregor (the 1952 Australian Open singles winner) against Segura. Gonzales won the Cleveland event, defeating Don Budge in the final in four sets. Gonzales was awarded the Pilsner of Cleveland Trophy for his victory. At Wembley 1953 and two days later in Paris, he was beaten by Sedgman, the eventual winner of these tournaments, and Sedgman was ranked the pro No. 1 for 1953 by Tennis de France in its full season ranking list. In June, the Players Committee of the Cleveland U.S. Pro or Cleveland World Pro (billed title) ranked Gonzales as the world No. 1 professional player for 1953 and he was also ranked No. 1 pro in October by Ken McGregor.

1954

In late 1953, Kramer, then a temporarily retired player (due to his back troubles), signed Gonzales (a seven-year contract) to play in a 1954 US tour also featuring Pancho Segura, Frank Sedgman, and Donald Budge (the latter being replaced in March 1954 by Carl Earn for the last weeks of the tour). In the subsequent matches Gonzales beat Segura 30–21 and Sedgman by the same score. After this tour, Gonzales won the Cleveland World Pro or Cleveland U.S. Pro held at the Cleveland Arena from April 27 through May 2 and where all the best, except Pails, were present. Gonzales was awarded the Pilsner of Cleveland Trophy for his victory at Cleveland.

In early June 1954, Gonzales won the U.S. Professional Championships held by Jack Kramer at the Los Angeles Tennis Club in California. Gonzales was seeded No. 1 and defeated both Sedgman and Segura, (Note: Segura was the defending champion from that version of the U.S. Pro last held in 1951 at Forest Hills (there was also the Cleveland US Pro, described as such in contemporary press reports and by Jack Kramer and Pancho Gonzales in their autobiographies. It was also approved by the Professional Players Association of Tennis (PPAT) in the early 1950s.) The 1951 U.S. Pro at Forest Hills was the previous time before the 1954 L.A. Tennis Club U.S. Pro that the winner was awarded the Benrus Cup. The Cup was under the jurisdiction of the USPLTA. The Cleveland promoter, Jack March, had applied to the USPLTA (an organisation of teaching professionals) in 1952 for their sanction of the Cleveland tournament as the U.S. Pro, but was not successful, and would use the term International Pro and, from 1953, World Pro for his Cleveland tournament. The 1954 U.S. Pro at L.A. would be the only occasion where Gonzales was awarded the USPLTA's Benrus Cup. The Cleveland World Pro Championships awarded different trophies, the Pilsner of Cleveland Trophy from 1951 to 1958, the Leisy Brewing Trophy in 1959, and the Pepsi-Cola Trophy from 1960 to 1964. Jack March reportedly warned of legal action against Kramer in 1960 to maintain the Cleveland tournament's exclusive rights to the "World Pro Tennis Championships" title name. Kramer had been using the title "World's Professional Championship of Tennis" to describe his own tours in his brochures. Kramer changed his brochures to "World Series" for the 1961 pro tour. March would continue to bill the Cleveland event as "World Pro" until its final installment in 1964.) the latter in a close five set final to win the USPLTA Benrus Trophy for the only time in his career. Gonzales thus won two U.S. Pro titles (according to some writers) in one year, a unique achievement in tennis.

Gonzales then played in the Far East tour (September–October 1954) that visited Japan, Korea, the Philippines, and Hong Kong. He finished second to Sedgman and barely won over Segura and Kramer, who was making a comeback in singles after a 14-month retirement. Later that year Gonzales enjoyed further success: he swept the Australian Tour of November–December 1954 by beating Sedgman 16–9, McGregor 15–0, and Segura, 4–2. Although he was beaten by the Australian Dinny Pails in the last competition of the year, Gonzales had clearly established himself as the top player in the world in 1954. In December, the International Professional Tennis Association ranked Gonzales as the No. 1 professional player for 1954.

1955–1956

In 1955–56, Gonzales beat Tony Trabert in the World series by 74 matches to 27. Forty years after his matches with Gonzales, Trabert told interviewer Joe McCauley "that Gonzales's serve was the telling factor on their tour — it was so good that it earned him many cheap points. Trabert felt that, while he had the better groundstrokes, he could not match Pancho's big, fluent service."

Much of Gonzales's competitive fire during these years derived from the anger he felt at being paid much less than the players he was regularly beating. In 1956, for instance, he was guaranteed US$15,000 for the pro tour, while his touring opponent, the recently turned professional Tony Trabert, had a guarantee for US$80,000. He had a poor and often adversarial relationship with most of the other players and generally travelled and lived by himself, showing up only in time to play his match, then moving on alone to the next town. Gonzales and Jack Kramer, the long-time promoter of the tour, had a bitter and inimical relationship dating to the days when Kramer had first beaten the youthful Gonzales on his initial tour. Now they fought incessantly about money, while Kramer openly rooted for the other players to beat Gonzales. As much as he disliked Gonzales, however, Kramer knew that Gonzales was the star attraction of the touring professionals and that without him there would be no tour at all.

Regarding the tour, Kramer writes that "even though Gonzales was usually the top name, he would almost never help promote the tour. The players could have tolerated his personal disagreeableness, but his refusal to help the group irritated them the most. Frankly, the majority of players disliked Gonzales intensely. Sedgman almost came to blows with Gonzales once. Trabert and Gorgo hated each other. The only player he ever tried to get along with was Lew Hoad."

Trabert also told McCauley in their interview that "I appreciated his tennis ability but I never came to respect him as a person. Too often I had witnessed him treat people badly without a cause. He was a loner, sullen most of the time, with a big chip on his shoulder and he rarely associated with us on the road. Instead he'd appear at the appointed hour for his match, then vanish back into the night without saying a word to anyone. We'd all stay around giving autographs to the fans before moving on to the next city. Not Pancho. On court, he was totally professional as well as a fantastic player." In a 2005 interview, Ted Schroeder commented on Gonzales's intense demeanor both on and off the court, "We hardly ever spoke a civil word to one another, yet we were friends. He was a very prideful man, not proud, prideful. When you understood that, you understood him."

Gonzales won at Cleveland in 1955 and 1956, both events using the VASSS (Van Alen Simplified Scoring System, i.e. table tennis scoring), beating Segura in the final in both years. Gonzales played against Trabert in a South American tour, losing six matches to Trabert on outdoor clay, but winning the three indoor matches. Gonzales won the inaugural Los Angeles Masters tournament in early August 1956, defeating Sedgman in the deciding match. Sedgman missed the first five and a half months of 1956. Gonzales and Trabert played a five-set final at Roland Garros in 1956, with Trabert winning in the fifth set. At the Wembley World Pro Indoor Championships in 1956, Gonzales won a classic final with Sedgman in four long sets: "The match lasted almost three hours and ended at 12.35am. B.B.C. Television covered it to the end." (It was customary for the Wembley final to be broadcast nationally in the UK on the BBC). Lawn Tennis and Badminton magazine and International Professional Tennis Association ranked Gonzales the world No. 1 professional for 1955. Cleveland tournament promoter Jack March ranked Gonzales the world No. 1 professional for 1956.

1957

At the end of 1956, Kramer signed Ken Rosewall to play a world series tour against Gonzales. In early 1957, Gonzales flew to Australia for the first ten matches against Rosewall in his native country. Gonzales had developed a "half-dollar"-size cyst on the palm on his right hand and there was speculation in the newspapers that his tennis career might be over. Kramer's personal physician began to treat it with injections, and it gradually began to shrink. It was still painful, however, when Gonzales beat Rosewall in their initial match and eventually won the Australian portion of the tour 7 matches to 3, with Rosewall beating Gonzales in a tournament whose results did not count towards the series total. By the time the tour opened in New York in late February, the cyst had shrunk considerably and Gonzales went on to beat Rosewall by a final score of 50 matches to 26.

Gonzales won the 1957 Forest Hills Tournament of Champions with a perfect 5–0 record, beating Sedgman in a five-set deciding match. The event was broadcast nationally on CBS television. Gonzales also won the Cleveland tournament, beating Trabert and Segura, and the Los Angeles Masters tournament.

Kramer has written that he was so worried that Rosewall would offer no competition to Gonzales and would thereby destroy the financial success of the tour that, for the only time in his career as a player or promoter, he asked Gonzales while in Australia to "carry" Rosewall in return for having his share of the gross receipts raised from 20 percent to 25 percent. Gonzales reluctantly agreed. After four matches, with Gonzales ahead 3 to 1, Gonzales came to Kramer to say that "I can't play when I'm thinking about trying to carry the kid. I can't concentrate. It just bothers me too much." By this time, however, it was apparent that Rosewall would be fully competitive with Gonzales, so Kramer told Gonzales to return to his normal game — and that he could keep his additional five percent. Gonzales built a 5 to 1 lead over Rosewall in the Australian portion of the tour. Gonzales would eventually build a lifetime head-to-head edge against Rosewall on grass of 24 to 14.

Later that year, Gonzales sued in California superior court to have his seven-year contract with Kramer declared invalid. As proof of his claim, Gonzales cited being paid 25 percent of the gate instead of the stipulated 20 percent. Judge Leon T. David found Gonzales's reasoning implausible and ruled in favor of Kramer. Gonzales remained bound to Kramer by contract until 1960." Gonzales was ranked world No. 1 pro by Jack March for the 1957 season. Gonzales was also ranked No. 1 in October 1957 in a combined pro/amateur ranking by Adrian Quist.

1958

The most difficult challenge that Gonzales faced during his dominant years came from Lew Hoad, the powerful young Australian who had won four Grand Slam titles as an amateur. In the 1958 world series tour, Gonzales and Hoad (in his rookie year), played head-to-head 87 times. Hoad won the Australian series 8 to 5, and 18 of the first 27 matches. It appeared that he was about to displace Gonzales as the professional world champion. Gonzales, however, revamped and improved his backhand. Also, Hoad suffered back trouble beginning in early March which reduced his ability to play at a high level and contributed and coincided with the turnaround in results on the tour. Gonzales won the 1958 series by a margin of 51 wins to 36 wins for Hoad.

In January, Gonzales finished third in the Kooyong Tournament of Champions, the richest tournament of the year, losing his match to Hoad. In May, he beat Hoad in the final at Cleveland as Hoad's leg injury worsened. Gonzales received his record sixth Pilsner of Cleveland Trophy award for the victory. Gonzales won the 1958 Forest Hills Tournament of Champions with a 5–1 record, defeating Rosewall in the deciding match. He lost to Hoad in the semifinal at the Roland Garros World Professional Championships. Gonzales lost to Sedgman in the semifinal of the World Professional Indoor Championships at Wembley, and had earlier lost to him in the semifinal of the Sydney Masters. Jack March ranked Gonzales the world No. 1 professional tennis player for 1958 and Jack Kramer also ranked Gonzales world No. 1 pro for 1958.

1959

Gonzales played Hoad again in the 4-man World Professional Championship Tour in 1959 and Pancho finished with 13 wins and 15 losses against Hoad, but Gonzales achieved a perfect record against rookies Cooper and Anderson to keep his world championship title. The series concluded at the end of May and Gonzales was proclaimed in 1959 and 1960 press reports as the "world champion". Gonzales was referred to in a paid advertisement for the pro tour in a 1960 Boston Globe edition as "world champion". Gonzales beat Hoad to retain his Cleveland title, played during the 4-man tour and not part of the Ampol Open Trophy tournament series.

Gonzales finished second to Hoad in the point ranking on the 1959/1960 Ampol Open Trophy world series of tournaments, winning four of the tournaments (Sydney Marks Athletic Field, L.A. Tennis Club Masters, Toronto Lawn Tennis Club O'Keefe, Ampol White City TOC), losing the Forest Hills Tournament of Champions final to Hoad, but winning the White City Tournament of Champions, where he beat Hoad in the final. Gonzales defaulted the final and deciding Ampol series tournament in December, the Qantas Kooyong, to spend the holidays in the U.S.

Jack Kramer ranked Gonzales as the world No. 1 professional tennis player for 1959 in his personal pro ranking list (different from Kramer's point ranking list) with Sedgman No. 2, Rosewall No. 3, and Hoad as No. 4. Robert Roy of L'Équipe magazine agreed with Gonzales as No. 1 and Hoad as No. 5 for 1959. Jack March ranked Gonzales number one in his pro ranking list for the 1959 season with Hoad second.

1960

Gonzales faced Rosewall, Segura and new pro signing Alex Olmedo on the 1960 World Professional Championship tour (Trabert also played a few matches early on). Gonzales was at the peak of his form, beating Rosewall 20 to 5 and easily overcoming Segura and Olmedo. During a match against Segura at White Plains on February 13, 1960, Gonzales served 33 aces. In April 1960 it was reported that "Pancho Gonzales, world's pro tennis champ since 1954, confirmed his recent announcement that he would quit Jack Kramer's touring troupe May 1. However, Gonzales said he might play in a few pro tournaments after that if they did not involve touring". Gonzales did return to touring and played in the 1961 World Series. Gonzales and Hoad did not play against each other in 1960. Kramer ranked Gonzales as world No. 1 professional tennis player for 1960 with Sedgman No. 2, Rosewall No. 3, and Hoad No. 4, the same ranking order for the third straight year.

1961

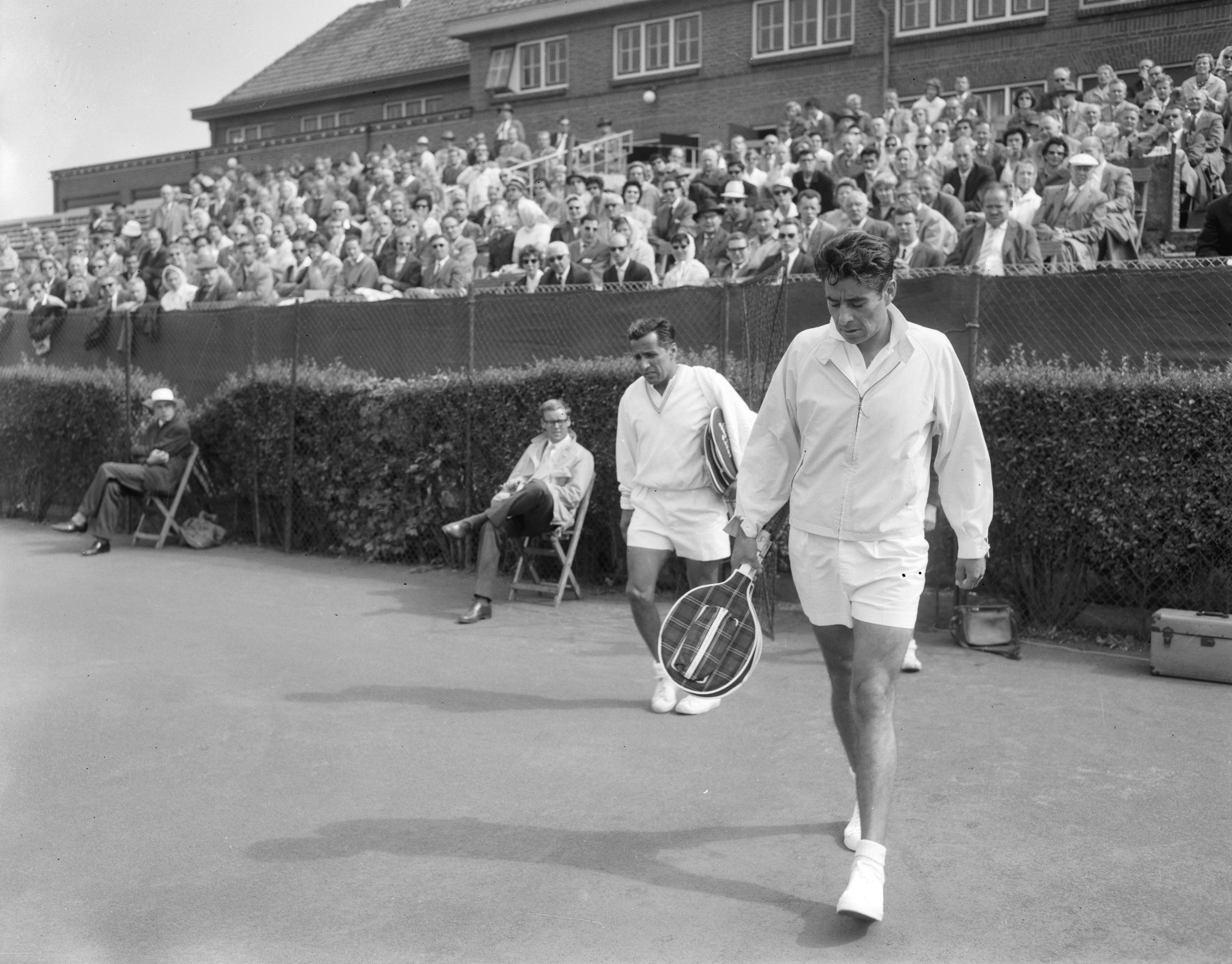
Pancho Segura (left) and Gonzales (right) at the Professional Championship in Noordwijk, Netherlands in August 1961.

The 1961 World Series would not feature Rosewall, who opted not to play. Gonzales beat Andrés Gimeno, Trabert (replacing Hoad), Sedgman (also replacing Hoad), Hoad (who withdrew with a broken foot), Barry MacKay, Olmedo, and Butch Buchholz. The top two players, Gonzales and Gimeno then played a head-to-head series to determine the champion. Gonzales beat Gimeno 21 match wins to 7, in single-set matches.

Gonzales beat Gimeno and Sedgman to win at Cleveland (Hoad and Rosewall did not enter). Later in the year there were signs Gonzales' dominance was waning. He lost to Rosewall in the final of the French Pro championships on red clay at Roland Garros, and at Wembley on indoor wood he lost in the semifinals to Hoad. Then Gonzales went into a period of retirement.

1962–1963

Gonzales did not play on the pro circuit at all in 1962. His only appearance in 1963 was at the United States Professional Championship, which were held that year at the hallowed Forest Hills courts. Gonzales both dismayed and infuriated his colleagues by being the only player who was paid for his participation. Having learned by bitter experience about the exigencies of the pro tour, Gonzales had demanded, and received, US$5,000 in advance for his appearance in the tournament. An out-of-shape, semi-retired Gonzales was beaten in the first round by Alex Olmedo. Ken Rosewall eventually beat Rod Laver in the finals but neither of them collected a penny: the promoter had failed to obtain a television contract, could not meet his costs and couldn't pay any prize money to any of the players.

1964

Gonzales returned to play on the pro circuit in 1964. By now, Rod Laver had arrived in the pro ranks.

In early May, 1964, Gonzales defeated Gimeno and Anderson to win the Cleveland World Pro, his ninth Cleveland title. Arguably Gonzales' best tournament victory of 1964 came in late May at the U.S. Pro Indoors at White Plains. After coming from a set down to beat both Laver and Hoad earlier in the event, Gonzales trailed Rosewall in the best of five set final by 2 sets to 0 and 1–4. Trailing by two service breaks in the third set, Gonzales managed to turn the match around and won in five sets in a final that lasted 3 hours and 11 minutes. Gonzales finished third behind Rosewall and Laver in the points series for the season, which did not include the Australian tournaments.

1965–1967

Despite a good comeback year in 1964, Gonzales was no longer the top pro. In January 1965, Gonzales won the New South Wales Pro in Sydney beating Laver and Rosewall. Gonzales also beat Laver and Rosewall to win the 1965 CBS TV Pro at Dallas on a clay surface. The tournament was the richest of the year, and was broadcast nationally on the CBS television network. Gonzales was the leading money winner on the pro tour through the U.S. series of tournaments with $18,945, not including the $8,000 first prize for winning the Dallas event. However, Gonzales did not play in Europe that year, and Laver, Rosewall, Gimeno and Buchholz all earned more prize money than Gonzales by the end of the year. By the late 1960s Gonzales was a declining force, though still a big drawing card. Laver was the top player in the late 1960s.

=== Open tennis ===
1968

In April 1968, he was the first professional to lose to an amateur, the British player Mark Cox. The then-24-year-old Cox beat Gonzales at the British Hard Court Championships at Bournemouth, in five sets, in two and a quarter hours.

The first major open tournament was the 1968 French Open, when Gonzales had just turned 40. In spite of the fact that he had been semi-retired for a number of years and that the tournament was held on slow clay courts that penalize serve-and-volley players, Gonzales beat the 1967 defending champion Roy Emerson in the quarterfinals. He then lost in the semifinals to Rod Laver. He lost in the third round of 1968 Wimbledon but later beat the second-seeded Tony Roche in the fourth round of the 1968 US Open, before losing an epic match to the Dutch Tom Okker.

Gonzales finished third in the NTL rankings for 1968, and was selected to enter the season combined professional final at Madison Square Garden together with the top four WCT players in an eight-man field. Gonzales won a close dramatic win over Rosewall, then defeated Gimeno in the semifinal, before losing the final to Roche.

1969

In 1969, it was Gonzales's turn to prevail in the longest match ever played till that time, one so long and arduous that it resulted in the advent of tiebreak scoring. As a 41-year-old at Wimbledon, Gonzales met Charlie Pasarell, a Puerto Rican younger than Gonzales by 16 years who revered his opponent. Pasarell won a lengthy 46-game first set, then with daylight fading, the 41-year-old Gonzales argued that the match should be suspended. The referee didn't relent, and the petulant Gonzales virtually threw the second set. At the break, the referee agreed the players should stop. Gonzales was booed as he walked off Centre Court. The next day, the serves, the volleys, and all the prowess that made Gonzales a fiery competitor surfaced. Pasarell, seeking to exploit Gonzales's advanced years, tried to aim soft service returns at Gonzales's feet and tire him with frequent lobs. Gonzales rebounded to win three straight sets. In the fifth set, Gonzales saved all seven match points that Pasarell had against him, twice coming back from 0–40 deficits, to walk off the court the eventual winner in a 5-hour, 12-minute match. The final score was 22–24, 1–6, 16–14, 6–3, 11–9. Gonzales went on to the fourth round of the championship, where he was beaten in four sets by Arthur Ashe. The match with Pasarell, however, is still remembered as one of the highlights in the history of tennis and was called one of "The Ten Greatest Matches of the Open Era", in the November/December 2003 issue of TENNIS magazine.

The match would (largely due to the introduction of the tie break) remain the longest in terms of games played until the 11 hours and 183 games long Isner–Mahut match at the 2010 Wimbledon Championships.

In late 1969, Gonzales won the Howard Hughes Open in Las Vegas and the Pacific Southwest Open in Los Angeles, beating, among others, John Newcombe, Ken Rosewall, Stan Smith (twice), Cliff Richey, and Arthur Ashe. He was the top American money-winner for 1969 with US$46,288.

1970

Roy Emerson, the Australian player who won 12 major titles during the 1960s as an amateur when most of the best players in the world were professionals, turned pro in early 1968 at the age of 31, having won the French Championships the year before. Gonzales, at the age of 40, beat Emerson in five sets in the quarterfinals of the 1968 French Open. In the following years, Gonzales beat Emerson another 11 times, apparently losing very few matches to him. In the Champions Classic of 1970 in Miami, Florida, however, Emerson did beat Gonzales in straight sets.

Gonzales continued to play in the occasional tournament in his 40s. He could also occasionally beat the clear number-one player in the world, Rod Laver. Their most famous meeting was a US$10,000 winner-take-all match before a crowd of 14,761 in Madison Square Garden in January 1970. Coming just after the Australian had completed a calendar-year sweep of the Grand Slams, the 41-year-old Gonzales beat Laver in five sets.

1971–1973

In spite of the fact that Gonzales was still known as a serve-and-volley player, in 1971, when he was 43 and Jimmy Connors was 19, he beat the young baseliner by playing him from the baseline at the Pacific Southwest Open. Around this time, Gonzales relocated to Las Vegas to be the Tennis Director at Caesars Palace, and he hired Chuck Pate, his childhood friend, to run the Pro Shop. In 1972, Gonzales became the oldest player to have ever won a professional tournament, winning the 1972 Des Moines Open, which was part of the USLTA Indoor Circuit, over 24-year-old Georges Goven when he was three months shy of his 44th birthday. In June 1972, Gonzales reached the semifinals of the Queen's Club Championships, at age 44, and was leading by a set against John Paish when he was disqualified by the tournament referee after an argument over the replacement of a linesman. At South Orange in August 1973, Gonzales beat John Lloyd, Sandy Mayer and Paul Gerken (all players more than twenty years younger than himself) before losing in the semifinals to Vijay Amritraj. Gonzales made his final Grand Slam singles appearance, losing in round one of the US Open to Tom Okker. In September, Gonzales lost in the second round of the Pacific southwest championships in Los Angeles to Jimmy Connors.

== Personal and family life ==
González's parents, Manuel Antonio González and Carmen Alire Alonso, migrated from the Mexican state of Chihuahua to the U.S. in the early 1900s. González was born in 1928, the eldest of seven children. Kramer writes that "Gorgo was not the poor Mexican-American that people assumed. He didn't come from a wealthy family, but from a stable middle-class background, probably a lot like mine. He had a great mother and there was always a warm feeling of family loyalty. If anything, he might have been spoiled as a kid. It's a shame he suffered discrimination because of his Mexican heritage." However, according to other sources, Gonzales's father worked as a house-painter and he, along with his six siblings, were raised in a working-class neighborhood. In his autobiography, González states, "We had few luxuries at our house. Food wasn't abundant but it was simple and filling, and we never went hungry. Our clothes were just clothes – inexpensive but clean."

González had a long scar across his left cheek that, according to his autobiography, some members of the mass media of the 1940s attributed to his being a Mexican-American pachuco and hence involved in knife fights. It was one more slur that embittered González towards the media in general. The scar was actually the result of a prosaic street accident in 1935 when he was seven years old. He pushed a scooter too fast, ran into a passing car, and had his cheek gashed open by its door handle. He spent two weeks in the hospital as a result.

Gonzales was referred to as either "Richard" or "Ricardo" by his friends and family. As the child of working-class Hispanic parents, young Richard was well aware of the social prejudices of his day. He reportedly disliked the nickname "Pancho", as it was a common derogatory term used against Mexican Americans at the time. In the Hispanic community, the name "Pancho" is traditionally only given to individuals whose first name is "Francisco", as was the case with Gonzales' tennis rival, Pancho Segura.

Gonzales reportedly was "haunted by race issues throughout his life...Six months before he died, he told his brother Ralph that he should have taken the offer of the Mexican government in 1948 to give up his U.S. citizenship and play for Mexico. His bitterness at how he had been treated by his American WASP colleagues on the tour stayed with him all his life."

Although his surname was properly spelled "González", during most of his playing career he was known as "Gonzales". It was only towards the end of his life that the Spanish-language spelling began to be used regularly.

Gonzales later worked as a television commentator for ABC, though he made rare appearances at tournaments and was described as an adequate but unmotivated broadcaster. Nevertheless, he frequently offered thoughtful insight into contemporary professionals, with commentary that was often magnanimous, occasionally harsh, and always candid

For decades Gonzales had made US$75,000 a year from an endorsement contract with Spalding for racquets and balls but was unable to get along with the company personnel. Finally, in 1981, after nearly 30 years, Spalding refused to renew the contract. He had also been the tennis and tournament director at Caesars Palace on the Las Vegas Strip for 16 years, another lucrative job. In 1985, he was fired after refusing to give playing lessons to the wife of his boss. As S. L. Price wrote about Gonzales in a 2002 Sports Illustrated article, "There was no more perfect match than Pancho and Vegas: both dark and disreputable, both hard and mean and impossible to ignore."

Gonzales married and divorced five times and had nine children: he wed his childhood sweetheart, Henrietta Pedrin, on March 23, 1948; they had three children. He married actress (and Miss Rheingold of 1958) Madelyn Darrow (sister of Barbara Darrow) twice; they had three children including twin girls. He married his dental hygienist, Betty, in Beverly Hills, and had one daughter. His last wife, Rita, is the elder sister of Andre Agassi, and they had one son. According to Price's article, Rita's father, Mike Agassi hated Gonzales so much that he considered having him killed. Gonzales had coached the young Rita until she had rebelled against her father's 5,000-balls-a-day-regimen and first moved in with, then married, on March 31, 1984, the much-older Gonzales. Years before, Mike Agassi, already a tennis fanatic, had once served as a linesman for one of Gonzales's professional matches in Chicago. Gonzales had upbraided Agassi so severely for perceived miscalls that Agassi walked away and sat in the stands.

Kramer says that "Gonzales never seemed to get along with his various wives, although this never stopped him from getting married... Segura once said, 'You know, the nicest thing Gorgo ever says to his wives is 'Shut up'". Following a ten-month battle with stomach cancer, Gonzales died on July 3, 1995, at the Sunrise Hospital in Las Vegas at the age of 67, in poverty and estranged from his ex-wives and children except for Rita and their son, Skylar. Andre Agassi paid for his funeral.

== Tennis legacy ==
Pancho Gonzales is considered one of the greatest tennis players of all-time.

Gonzales won two U.S. National Championships before turning professional in late 1949. As a professional he was ineligible to play at the Grand Slam events from 1950–1968. In his professional career, Gonzales won the United States Professional Championship nine times, the Wembley professional title in London four times, and the Tournament of Champions three times. He won the Los Angeles Masters and U.S. Professional Indoor tournaments three times each. He won seven World Pro Tours, two Australian Pro Tours, and a South African Pro Tour. Gonzalez was reported to be the first tennis player to earn a half-million dollars in career prize money.

Gonzales two biggest contemporary threats were Lew Hoad and Ken Rosewall, with Gonzales leading their head-to-heads 104–78 and 117–87 respectively. On grass it was Hoad over Gonzales 21–14, and Gonzales over Rosewall 24–14. On the World Championship Tour Gonzales led Hoad 64–51, and led Rosewall 70–31.

The tennis rankings of that era were composed by tennis writers, promoters, and players, however in 1946, 1959–1960, and 1964–1968 there was also a point system based on tournament series to provide a No. 1 ranking for professionals. Gonzales was ranked world No. 1 in some rankings from 1952 to 1961. The Tennis Hall of Fame says he was No. 1 from 1952 to 1960." Other sources state that Gonzales was world number one for an eight-year period. Gonzales was the No. 1 money winner on the American portion of the 1965 season. Gonzales was runner-up for the combined WCT/NTL professional tours championship final in 1968. From 1952 through 1961 Gonzales was considered the best of this time period, with some saying he had taken the crown from Bill Tilden as the best of all time.

Gonzales was known for his fiery will to win, his cannonball serve, and his outstanding net game, a combination so potent that the rules on the 1960 professional tour were briefly changed to prohibit him from advancing to the net immediately after serving. Under the new rules, the returned serve had to bounce before the server could make his own first shot, thereby keeping Gonzales from playing his usual serve-and-volley game. He won even so, and the rules were changed back. Kramer also tried moving the service line to a yard behind the baseline; once again, Gonzales won in spite of the change.

Gonzales was approximately 6 feet 3 inches (1.91 m) and weighed 183 pounds (83 kg), quite tall among his peers. Tennis player Tony Trabert said "The way he can move that 6-foot-3-inch frame of his around the court is almost unbelievable" and "Pancho's reflexes and reactions are God-given talents. Gussie Moran said he was "a god patrolling his personal heaven." Arthur Ashe called Gonzales "the only idol he ever had." Allen Fox said "Pancho Gonzales was, if not the best player of all time, certainly one of the best." In 1978, Ellsworth Vines ranked his all-time top 10 and rated Gonzales No. 3 Jack Kramer, on the other hand, who became a world-class player in 1940 and then beat Gonzales badly in the latter's first year as a professional, has stated that he believes that although Gonzales was better than either Laver or Sampras, he was not as good as either Ellsworth Vines or Don Budge. (Note: In his 1979 autobiography Kramer considered the best ever to have been either Don Budge (for consistent play) or Ellsworth Vines (at the height of his game). The next four best were, chronologically, Bill Tilden, Fred Perry, Bobby Riggs, and Pancho Gonzales. After these six came the "second echelon" of Rod Laver, Lew Hoad, Ken Rosewall, Gottfried von Cramm, Ted Schroeder, Jack Crawford, Pancho Segura, Frank Sedgman, Tony Trabert, John Newcombe, Arthur Ashe, Stan Smith, Björn Borg, and Jimmy Connors He felt unable to rank Henri Cochet and René Lacoste accurately but felt they were among the very best.) In 2007, after Gonzales and Hoad were both dead, Kramer gave a higher assessment of both players, rating them among the top five players of all time. Frank Sedgman and Sidney Wood ranked Gonzales No. 4 all-time.

Tennis commentator, journalist and author Bud Collins writes that Gonzales was "probably as good as anyone who ever played the game, if not better." In 2006, Collins also said "If I had to choose someone to play for my life, it would be Pancho Gonzales." In the Tennis Channel series "The 100 Greatest of All Time" in 2012, Gonzales was ranked the 22nd greatest male tennis player of all time. A Sports Illustrated article stated: "If earth was on the line in a tennis match, the man you want serving to save humankind would be Ricardo Alonso Gonzales."

== Honors ==
Gonzales was inducted into the International Tennis Hall of Fame at Newport in 1968.

California State University, Los Angeles named their Tennis Center the Rosie Casals/Pancho Gonzalez Tennis Center in 2013.

== Performance timeline for major tournaments ==
Key
W	F	SF	QF	#R	RR	Q#	DNQ	A	NH

(W) winner; (F) finalist; (SF) semifinalist; (QF) quarterfinalist; (#R) rounds 4, 3, 2, 1; (RR) round-robin stage; (Q#) qualification round; (DNQ) did not qualify; (A) absent; (NH) not held; (SR) strike rate (events won / competed); (W–L) win–loss record.

																					Career SR	Career W-L	Career Win %
Grand Slam tournaments	Amateur				Professional										Open Era						2 / 17	44–15	75%
Grand Slam tournaments	1947	1948		1949	1950–1967										1968	1969	1970	1971	1972	1973	2 / 17	44–15	75%
Australian	A	A		A	Unable to compete											3R	A	A	A	A	0 / 1	2–1	67%
French	A	A		SF	Unable to compete										SF	A	A	A	A	A	0 / 2	9–2	82%
Wimbledon	A	A		4R	Unable to compete										3R	4R	A	2R	2R	A	0 / 5	10–5	67%
U.S.	2R	W		W	Unable to compete										QF	4R	3R	3R	1R	1R	2 / 9	23–7	77%
Pro Slam tournaments	Professional																				13 / 27	65–14	82%
Pro Slam tournaments	1950	1951		1952	1953	1954		1955	1956	1957	1958	1959	1960	1961	1962	1963	1964	1965	1966	1967	13 / 27	65–14	82%
U.S. Pro	A	A	2nd	F	W	W	W	W	W	W	W	W	A	W	A	QF	F	SF	A	A	9 / 14	36–5	88%
French Pro	NH								F	NH	SF	A	A	F	A	A	SF	A	A	A	0 / 4	7–4	64%
Wembley Pro	W	W		W	F	NH			W	SF	SF	A	A	SF	A	A	SF	A	A	A	4 / 9	22–5	81%

== Major finals ==
=== Grand Slam tournaments ===
==== Singles: (2 titles) ====
Result	Year	Championship	Surface	Opponent	Score
Win	1948	U.S. Championships	Grass	(South Africa) Eric Sturgess	6–2, 6–3, 14–12
Win	1949	U.S. Championships	Grass	(United States) Ted Schroeder	16–18, 2–6, 6–1, 6–2, 6–4

==== Doubles: (2 titles) ====
Result	Year	Championship	Surface	Partner	Opponents	Score
Win	1949	French Championships	Grass	(United States) Frank Parker	(South Africa) Eustace Fannin (South Africa) Eric Sturgess	6–3, 8–6, 5–7, 6–3
Win	1949	Wimbledon	Grass	(United States) Frank Parker	(United States) Gardnar Mulloy (United States) Ted Schroeder	6–4, 6–4, 6–2

=== Pro Slam tournaments ===
==== Singles: 19 (13 titles, 6 runner-ups) ====
Result	Year	Championship	Surface	Opponent	Score
Win	1950	Wembley Pro	Indoor	(United States) Welby Van Horn	6–3, 6–3, 6–2
Loss	1951	U.S. Pro	Grass	(Ecuador) Pancho Segura	3–6, 4–6, 2–6
Win	1951	Wembley Pro	Indoor	(Ecuador) Pancho Segura	6–2, 6–2, 2–6, 6–4
Loss	1952	U.S. Pro	Indoor	(Ecuador) Pancho Segura	6–3, 4–6, 6–3, 4–6, 0–6
Win	1952	Wembley Pro	Indoor	(United States) Jack Kramer	3–6, 3–6, 6–2, 6–4, 7–5
Win	1953	U.S. Pro	Indoor	(United States) Don Budge	4–6, 6–4, 7–5, 6–2
Loss	1953	Wembley Pro	Indoor	(Australia) Frank Sedgman	1–6, 2–6, 2–6
Win	1954	U.S. Pro	Indoor	(Australia) Frank Sedgman	6–3, 9–7, 3–6, 6–2
Win	1954	U.S. Pro	Cement	(Ecuador) Pancho Segura	6–4, 4–6, 2–6, 6–2, 6–4
Win	1955	U.S. Pro	Indoor	(Ecuador) Pancho Segura	21–16, 19–21, 21–8, 20–22, 21–19
Win	1956	U.S. Pro	Indoor	(Ecuador) Pancho Segura	21–15, 13–21, 21–14, 22–20
Loss	1956	French Pro	Clay	(United States) Tony Trabert	3–6, 6–4, 7–5, 6–8, 2–6
Win	1956	Wembley Pro	Indoor	(Australia) Frank Sedgman	4–6, 11–9, 11–9, 9–7
Win	1957	U.S. Pro	Indoor	(Ecuador) Pancho Segura	6–3, 3–6, 7–5, 6–1
Win	1958	U.S. Pro	Indoor	(Australia) Lew Hoad	3–6, 4–6, 14–12, 6–1, 6–4
Win	1959	U.S. Pro	Indoor	(Australia) Lew Hoad	6–4, 6–2, 6–4
Win	1961	U.S. Pro	Indoor	(Australia) Frank Sedgman	6–3, 7–5
Loss	1961	French Pro	Clay	(Australia) Ken Rosewall	6–2, 4–6, 3–6, 6–8
Loss	1964	U.S. Pro	Grass	(Australia) Rod Laver	6–4, 3–6, 5–7, 4–6

== Sources ==
- Tennis Myth and Method (1978), Ellsworth Vines and Gene Vier (ISBN 9780670696659)
- Kramer, Jack (1981). The Game : My 40 Years in Tennis. London: Deutsch. ISBN 0233973079.
- McCauley, Joe (2000). The History of Professional Tennis. Windsor: The Short Run Book Company Limited.
- Man with a Racket, The Autobiography of Pancho Gonzales, as Told to Cy Rice (1959)
- The Tennis Book (1981), Edited by Michael Bartlett and Bob Gillen (ISBN 0-87795-344-9)
- The Lone Wolf, by S. L. Price, Sports Illustrated, June 26, 2002
- World of Tennis Yearbook 1971 (1971), by John Barrett, London
- Seebohm, Caroline (2009). Little Pancho. Lincoln and London: University of Nebraska Press. ISBN 978-0-8032-2041-6.
- Bercow, John (2014). Tennis Maestros. London: Biteback Publishing Ltd. ISBN 978-1-84954-512-9.
