= 1987 Benson & Hedges Championships – Doubles =

Doubles
- 1987 Benson & Hedges Championships

Final
- Champions: (Czechoslovakia) Miloslav Mečíř (Czechoslovakia) Tomáš Šmíd
- Runners-up: (United States) Ken Flach (United States) Robert Seguso
- Score: 7–5, 6–4

Details
- Draw: 16
- Seeds: 4

Events
| Singles | Doubles |
- Wembley Championships

John McEnroe and Peter Fleming were the defending champions, but McEnroe could not compete this year after facing a two-month suspension due to committing three code violations on his match against Slobodan Živojinović at the US Open. Fleming teamed up with Henri Leconte and lost in the first round to Mark Kratzmann and Laurie Warder.

Miloslav Mečíř and Tomáš Šmíd won the title by defeating Ken Flach and Robert Seguso 7–5, 6–4 in the final.

== Seeds ==
1. (United States) Ken Flach / (United States) Robert Seguso (final)
2. (Sweden) Anders Järryd / (Spain) Emilio Sánchez (quarterfinals)
3. (United States) Paul Annacone / (South Africa) Christo van Rensburg (semifinals)
4. (Czechoslovakia) Miloslav Mečíř / (Czechoslovakia) Tomáš Šmíd (champions)

== Draw ==
Key

- Q = Qualifier
- WC = Wild card
- LL = Lucky loser
- Alt = Alternate
- ITF = ITF entry
- PR = Protected ranking
- SR = Special ranking
- SE = Special exempt
- JE = Junior exempt
- JR = Junior Accelerator Programme entrant
- CO = College Accelerator Programme entrant
- NG = Next Gen Accelerator Program entrant
- w/o = Walkover
- r = Retired
- d = Defaulted

=== Draw ===
First round
1 | (United States) K Flach (United States) R Seguso | 6 | 6
(United Kingdom) J Bates (United Kingdom) A Castle | 2 | 4
(United States) A Kohlberg (United States) R Van't Hof | 6 | 3 | 6
(United States) L Bourne (United States) J Klaparda | 4 | 6 | 2
3 | (United States) P Annacone (South Africa) C van Rensburg | 6 | 7
(United States) M De Palmer (Poland) W Fibak | 1 | 6
(Switzerland) J Hlasek (Switzerland) C Mezzadri | 4 | 6 | 6
(Sweden) J Gunnarson (Sweden) J Nyström | 6 | 3 | 2
(Australia) M Kratzmann (Australia) L Warder | 5 | 6 | 6
(United States) P Fleming (France) H Leconte | 7 | 3 | 4
(United States) R Leach (United States) T Pawsat | 3 | 6
4 | (Czechoslovakia) M Mečíř (Czechoslovakia) T Šmíd | 6 | 7
(United States) K Curren (France) G Forget | 3 | 6 | 6
(Sweden) J Svensson (Sweden) M Tideman | 6 | 3 | 4
(Czechoslovakia) S Birner (Paraguay) F González | 2 | 3
2 | (Sweden) A Järryd (Spain) E Sánchez | 6 | 6

Quarterfinals
1 | (United States) K Flach (United States) R Seguso | 5 | 6 | 16
(United States) A Kohlberg (United States) R Van't Hof | 7 | 3 | 14
3 | (United States) P Annacone (South Africa) C van Rensburg | 6 | 6
(Switzerland) J Hlasek (Switzerland) C Mezzadri | 3 | 2
(Australia) M Kratzmann (Australia) L Warder | 3 | 7 | 4
4 | (Czechoslovakia) M Mečíř (Czechoslovakia) T Šmíd | 6 | 5 | 6
(United States) K Curren (France) G Forget | 4 | 7 | 7
2 | (Sweden) A Järryd (Spain) E Sánchez | 6 | 6 | 5

Semifinals
1 | (United States) K Flach (United States) R Seguso | 3 | 7 | 6
3 | (United States) P Annacone (South Africa) C van Rensburg | 6 | 6 | 2
4 | (Czechoslovakia) M Mečíř (Czechoslovakia) T Šmíd | 7 | 7
(United States) K Curren (France) G Forget | 6 | 6

Final
1 | (United States) K Flach (United States) R Seguso | 5 | 4
4 | (Czechoslovakia) M Mečíř (Czechoslovakia) T Šmíd | 7 | 6
