= 1982 Benson & Hedges Championships – Doubles =

Doubles
- 1982 Benson & Hedges Championships

Final
- Champion: (United States) Peter Fleming (United States) John McEnroe
- Runner-up: (Switzerland) Heinz Günthardt (Czechoslovakia) Tomáš Šmíd
- Score: 7–6, 6–4

Details
- Draw: 16
- Seeds: 4

Events
Singles	Doubles
- Wembley Championships

The 1981 Benson & Hedges Championships – Doubles was an event of the 1981 Benson & Hedges Championships tennis tournament and was played on indoor carpet courts at the Wembley Arena in London in the United Kingdom, between 11 November and 16 November 1981. The draw consisted of 16 teams and four of them were seeded. Ferdi Taygan and Sherwood Stewart were the defending Wembley Championships doubles champions but they did not compete together in this edition. The first-seeded team of Peter Fleming and John McEnroe won their fourth doubles title at the event after a straight-sets victory in the final against Heinz Günthardt and Tomáš Šmíd, 7–6, 6–4.

== Seeds ==
1. (United States) Peter Fleming / (United States) John McEnroe (champions)
2. (United States) Steve Denton / (United States) Ferdi Taygan (first round)
3. (United States) Tim Gullikson / (United States) Tom Gullikson (first round)
4. (Switzerland) Heinz Günthardt / (Czechoslovakia) Tomáš Šmíd

== Draw ==
Key

- Q = Qualifier
- WC = Wild card
- LL = Lucky loser
- Alt = Alternate
- ITF = ITF entry
- PR = Protected ranking
- SR = Special ranking
- SE = Special exempt
- JE = Junior exempt
- JR = Junior Accelerator Programme entrant
- CO = College Accelerator Programme entrant
- NG = Next Gen Accelerator Program entrant
- w/o = Walkover
- r = Retired
- d = Defaulted

First Round
1	(United States) Peter Fleming (United States) John McEnroe	6	6
(United Kingdom) Richard Lewis (South Africa) Frew McMillan	3	4
(United States) Victor Amaya (United States) Brian Teacher	6	6
(United Kingdom) John Feaver (South Africa) Freddie Sauer	4	2
(United States) Eric Fromm (Israel) Shlomo Glickstein	7	6
3	(United States) Tim Gullikson (United States) Tom Gullikson	6	4
(United States) Tracy Delatte (United States) Mel Purcell	7	6
(United States) Chip Hooper (New Zealand) Russell Simpson	5	3
(United States) Brian Gottfried (United States) Bruce Manson	6	6
(United Kingdom) Andrew Jarrett (United Kingdom) Jonathan Smith	4	1
4	(Switzerland) Heinz Günthardt (Czechoslovakia) Tomáš Šmíd	6	3	6
(Sweden) Anders Järryd (Sweden) Hans Simonsson	4	6	1
(Ecuador) Andrés Gómez (Italy) Claudio Panatta	6	6
(South Africa) Bernard Mitton (South Africa) Danie Visser	4	4
(United States) Mark Dickson (United States) Richard Meyer	6	6
2	(United States) Steve Denton (United States) Ferdi Taygan	3	2

Quarterfinals
1	(United States) Peter Fleming (United States) John McEnroe	w/o
(United States) Victor Amaya (United States) Brian Teacher
(United States) Eric Fromm (Israel) Shlomo Glickstein	6	7
(United States) Tracy Delatte (United States) Mel Purcell	4	6
(United States) Brian Gottfried (United States) Bruce Manson	3	3
(Switzerland) Heinz Günthardt (Czechoslovakia) Tomáš Šmíd	6	6
(Ecuador) Andrés Gómez (Italy) Claudio Panatta	3	2
(United States) Mark Dickson (United States) Richard Meyer	6	6

Semifinals
1	(United States) Peter Fleming (United States) John McEnroe	6	7
(United States) Eric Fromm (Israel) Shlomo Glickstein	3	6
(Switzerland) Heinz Günthardt (Czechoslovakia) Tomáš Šmíd	7	7
(United States) Mark Dickson (United States) Richard Meyer	5	5

Final
1	(United States) Peter Fleming (United States) John McEnroe	7	6
(Switzerland) Heinz Günthardt (Czechoslovakia) Tomáš Šmíd	6	4
