= 1970 Embassy British Indoor Championships – Men's singles =

Men's singles
- 1970 Embassy British Indoor Championships

Final
- Champion: (Australia) Rod Laver
- Runner-up: (United States) Cliff Richey
- Score: 6–3, 6–4, 6–4

Details
- Draw: 32
- Seeds: 8

Events
Singles	men	women
Doubles	men	women
← 1969 ·	Wembley Championships	· 1971 →

The 1970 Embassy British Indoor Championships – Men's singles was an event of the 1970 Embassy British Indoor Championships tennis tournament and was played on indoor carpet courts at the Wembley Arena in London in the United Kingdom, between 16 November and 21 November 1970. The draw comprised 32 players of whom eight were seeded. Rod Laver was the reigning singles champion at the British Indoor Championships. First-seeded Laver retained his title by defeating third-seeded Cliff Richey in the final, 6–3, 6–4, 6–4.

== Seeds ==
1. (Australia) Rod Laver (champion)
2. (Australia) Ken Rosewall (semifinals)
3. (United States) Cliff Richey (final)
4. (United States) Arthur Ashe (first round)
5. (Netherlands) Tom Okker (first round)
6. (Australia) Roy Emerson (second round)
7. (United States) Stan Smith (second round)
8. (Romania) Ilie Năstase (quarterfinals)

== Draw ==
=== Key ===
- Q = Qualifier
- WC = Wild card
- LL = Lucky loser
- Alt = Alternate
- SE = Special exempt
- PR = Protected ranking
- ITF = ITF entry
- JE = Junior exempt
- w/o = Walkover
- r = Retired
- d = Defaulted
- SR = Special ranking

=== Finals ===
Semifinals
1	(Australia) Rod Laver	6	6
(South Africa) Cliff Drysdale	4	4
3	(United States) Cliff Richey	7	6
2	(Australia) Ken Rosewall	5	2

Final
1	(Australia) Rod Laver	6	6	6
3	(United States) Cliff Richey	3	4	4

=== Top half ===
First Round
1	(Australia) Rod Laver	7	7
(Chile) Jaime Fillol	5	5
(Spain) Andrés Gimeno	6	6
(Australia) Ray Ruffels	3	2
8	(Romania) Ilie Năstase	6	6
(Australia) Dick Crealy	4	4
(United States) Tom Gorman	8	9	7
(United States) Marty Riessen	9	8	5
4	(United States) Arthur Ashe	1	2
(South Africa) Cliff Drysdale	6	6
(United Kingdom) Mark Cox	8	6
(United Kingdom) David Lloyd	6	3
5	(Netherlands) Tom Okker	2	8
(Australia) John Alexander	6	9
(United States) Dennis Ralston	6	6	6
(United States) Clark Graebner	8	1	4

Second Round
1	(Australia) Rod Laver	6	4	9
(Spain) Andrés Gimeno	1	6	8
8	(Romania) Ilie Năstase	6	6	6
(United States) Tom Gorman	8	2	4
(South Africa) Cliff Drysdale	9	6
(United Kingdom) Mark Cox	8	3
(Australia) John Alexander	3	6	6
(United States) Dennis Ralston	6	3	8

Quarterfinals
1	(Australia) Rod Laver	6	6
8	(Romania) Ilie Năstase	1	2
(South Africa) Cliff Drysdale	9	6	6
(United States) Dennis Ralston	8	8	3

Semifinals
1	(Australia) Rod Laver	6	6
(South Africa) Cliff Drysdale	4	4

=== Bottom half ===
First Round
(United Kingdom) Roger Taylor	9	6
(Australia) Owen Davidson	8	2
(Socialist Federal Republic of Yugoslavia) Željko Franulović	7	4
6	(Australia) Roy Emerson	9	6
(France) Pierre Barthès	6	6
(United Kingdom) Graham Stilwell	0	2
(United States) Roy Barth	2	3
3	(United States) Cliff Richey	6	6
(United States) Pancho Gonzales	4	6	6
(Romania) Ion Țiriac	6	4	2
(Egypt) Ismail El Shafei	2	8
7	(United States) Stan Smith	6	9
(Socialist Federal Republic of Yugoslavia) Nikola Pilić	5	7	6
(Czechoslovakia) Jan Kodeš	7	5	4
(Australia) Bob Carmichael	8	8	5
2	(Australia) Ken Rosewall	6	9	7

Second Round
(United Kingdom) Roger Taylor	6	6
6	(Australia) Roy Emerson	3	2
(France) Pierre Barthès	5	6
3	(United States) Cliff Richey	7	8
(United States) Pancho Gonzales	8	9	9
7	(United States) Stan Smith	9	8	8
(Socialist Federal Republic of Yugoslavia) Nikola Pilić	2	1
2	(Australia) Ken Rosewall	6	6

Quarterfinals
(United Kingdom) Roger Taylor	6	9	2
3	(United States) Cliff Richey	8	8	6
(United States) Pancho Gonzales	2	3
2	(Australia) Ken Rosewall	6	6

Semifinals
3	(United States) Cliff Richey	7	6
2	(Australia) Ken Rosewall	5	2
