= 1988 Benson & Hedges Championships – Doubles =

Doubles
- 1988 Benson & Hedges Championships

Final
- Champions: (United States) Ken Flach (United States) Robert Seguso
- Runners-up: (United States) Marty Davis (Australia) Brad Drewett
- Score: 7–5, 6–2

Details
- Draw: 16 (1WC)
- Seeds: 4

Events
| Singles | Doubles |
- Wembley Championships

Miloslav Mečíř and Tomáš Šmíd were the defending champion, but Mečíř did not compete this year. Šmíd teamed up with Jakob Hlasek and lost in the quarterfinals to Marty Davis and Brad Drewett.

Ken Flach and Robert Seguso won the title by defeating Davis and Drewett 7–5, 6–2 in the final.

== Seeds ==
1. (United States) Ken Flach / (United States) Robert Seguso (champions)
2. (United States) Rick Leach / (United States) Jim Pugh (first round)
3. (Spain) Sergio Casal / (Australia) John Fitzgerald (first round)
4. (Mexico) Jorge Lozano / (United States) Todd Witsken (semifinals)

== Draw ==
Key

- Q = Qualifier
- WC = Wild card
- LL = Lucky loser
- Alt = Alternate
- ITF = ITF entry
- PR = Protected ranking
- SR = Special ranking
- SE = Special exempt
- JE = Junior exempt
- JR = Junior Accelerator Programme entrant
- CO = College Accelerator Programme entrant
- NG = Next Gen Accelerator Program entrant
- w/o = Walkover
- r = Retired
- d = Defaulted

=== Draw ===
First round
1 | (United States) K Flach (United States) R Seguso | 7 | 7
(Australia) W Masur (Australia) M Woodforde | 6 | 6
(Italy) D Nargiso (Hungary) B Taróczy | 5 | 3
(Australia) B Dyke (Australia) L Warder | 7 | 6
3 | (Spain) S Casal (Australia) J Fitzgerald | 6 | 6 | 6
(United Kingdom) J Bates (United States) K Jones | 7 | 3 | 8
WC | (United Kingdom) D Felgate (United Kingdom) N Fulwood | 2 | 3
(United States) B Gilbert (United States) E Korita | 6 | 6
(Iran) M Bahrami (France) G Forget | 6 | 6 | 8
(New Zealand) K Evernden (United States) J Kriek | 1 | 7 | 10
(United Kingdom) A Castle (United States) T Wilkison | 6 | 3 | 6
4 | (Mexico) J Lozano (United States) T Witsken | 1 | 6 | 8
(Switzerland) J Hlasek (Czechoslovakia) T Šmíd | 6 | 6
(West Germany) R Osterthun (West Germany) C Saceanu | 4 | 4
(United States) M Davis (Australia) B Drewett | 7 | 7
2 | (United States) R Leach (United States) J Pugh | 5 | 6

Quarterfinals
1 | (United States) K Flach (United States) R Seguso | 1 | 7 | 6
(Australia) B Dyke (Australia) L Warder | 6 | 5 | 1
(United Kingdom) J Bates (United States) K Jones | 6 | 7 | 3
(United States) B Gilbert (United States) E Korita | 7 | 6 | 6
(New Zealand) K Evernden (United States) J Kriek | 3 | 6
4 | (Mexico) J Lozano (United States) T Witsken | 6 | 7
(Switzerland) J Hlasek (Czechoslovakia) T Šmíd | 6 | 3
(United States) M Davis (Australia) B Drewett | 7 | 6

Semifinals
1 | (United States) K Flach (United States) R Seguso | 6 | 6 | 6
(United States) B Gilbert (United States) E Korita | 4 | 7 | 4
4 | (Mexico) J Lozano (United States) T Witsken | 4 | 6 | 4
(United States) M Davis (Australia) B Drewett | 6 | 4 | 6

Final
1 | (United States) K Flach (United States) R Seguso | 7 | 6
(United States) M Davis (Australia) B Drewett | 5 | 2
