= 1989 Benson & Hedges Championships – Doubles =

Doubles
- 1989 Benson & Hedges Championships

Final
- Champions: (Switzerland) Jakob Hlasek (United States) John McEnroe
- Runners-up: (United Kingdom) Jeremy Bates (United States) Kevin Curren
- Score: 6–1, 7–6

Details
- Draw: 16
- Seeds: 4

Events
Singles	Doubles
- Wembley Championships

Ken Flach and Robert Seguso were the defending champions but lost in the quarterfinals to Jeremy Bates and Kevin Curren.

Jakob Hlasek and John McEnroe won in the final 6–1, 7–6 against Bates and Curren.

== Seeds ==
Champion seeds are indicated in bold text while text in italics indicates the round in which those seeds were eliminated.

1. (United States) Ken Flach / (United States) Robert Seguso (quarterfinals)
2. (Switzerland) **Jakob Hlasek** / (United States) **John McEnroe (champions)**
3. (South Africa) Pieter Aldrich / (South Africa) Danie Visser (semifinals)
4. (Australia) Darren Cahill / (Australia) John Fitzgerald (semifinals)

== Draw ==
Key

- Q = Qualifier
- WC = Wild card
- LL = Lucky loser
- Alt = Alternate
- ITF = ITF entry
- PR = Protected ranking
- SR = Special ranking
- SE = Special exempt
- JE = Junior exempt
- JR = Junior Accelerator Programme entrant
- CO = College Accelerator Programme entrant
- NG = Next Gen Accelerator Program entrant
- w/o = Walkover
- r = Retired
- d = Defaulted

First round
1	(United States) **K Flach** (United States) **R Seguso**	**6**	**6**
(United States) B Garrow (West Germany) C Saceanu	2	2
(United Kingdom) **J Bates** (United States) **K Curren**	**6**	**7**
(West Germany) E Jelen (Australia) W Masur	4	5
4	(Australia) **D Cahill** (Australia) **J Fitzgerald**	**7**	**6**
(West Germany) M Stich (Hungary) B Taróczy	6	1
(United States) J Canter (United States) L Shiras	4	3
(New Zealand) **K Evernden** (Czechoslovakia) **M Mečíř**	**6**	**6**
(United States) **P Annacone** (South Africa) **C van Rensburg**	**6**	**7**
(United Kingdom) A Castle (United States) D Goldie	3	6
(United States) M Davis (United States) S Davis	**7**	4	6
3	(South Africa) **P Aldrich** (South Africa) **D Visser**	6	**6**	**7**
(United Kingdom) N Brown (United Kingdom) N Fulwood	**7**	4	4
(France) **G Forget** (United Kingdom) **D Ison**	5	**6**	**6**
(Israel) A Mansdorf (Czechoslovakia) M Vajda	3	**6**	3
2	(Switzerland) **J Hlasek** (United States) **J McEnroe**	**6**	4	**6**

Quarterfinals
1	(United States) K Flach (United States) R Seguso
(United Kingdom) **J Bates** (United States) **K Curren**	w/o
4	(Australia) **D Cahill** (Australia) **J Fitzgerald**	**6**	5	**6**
(New Zealand) K Evernden (Czechoslovakia) M Mečíř	4	**7**	3
(United States) P Annacone (South Africa) C van Rensburg	**6**	3	4
3	(South Africa) **P Aldrich** (South Africa) **D Visser**	3	**6**	**6**
(France) G Forget (United Kingdom) D Ison	5	1
2	(Switzerland) **J Hlasek** (United States) **J McEnroe**	**7**	**6**

Semifinals
(United Kingdom) **J Bates** (United States) **K Curren**	**6**	5	**6**
4	(Australia) D Cahill (Australia) J Fitzgerald	1	**7**	3
3	(South Africa) P Aldrich (South Africa) D Visser	6	6
2	(Switzerland) **J Hlasek** (United States) **J McEnroe**	**7**	**7**

Final
(United Kingdom) Jeremy Bates (United States) Kevin Curren	1	6
2	(Switzerland) **Jakob Hlasek** (United States) **John McEnroe**	**6**	**7**
