= 1989 Benson & Hedges Championships – Singles =

Singles
- 1989 Benson & Hedges Championships

Final
- Champion: (United States) Michael Chang
- Runner-up: (France) Guy Forget
- Score: 6–2, 6–1, 6–1

Details
- Draw: 32
- Seeds: 8

Events
Singles	Doubles
- Wembley Championships

Jakob Hlasek was the defending champion but lost in the first round to Martin Střelba.

Michael Chang won the final 6–2, 6–1, 6–1 against Guy Forget.

== Seeds ==
A champion seed is indicated in bold text while text in italics indicates the round in which that seed was eliminated.

1. (United States) John McEnroe (semifinals)
2. (United States) **Michael Chang (champion)**
3. (United States) Brad Gilbert (quarterfinals)
4. (United States) Jimmy Connors (first round)
5. (Switzerland) Jakob Hlasek (first round)
6. (United States) Kevin Curren (second round)
7. (Soviet Union) Andrei Chesnokov (quarterfinals)
8. (Czechoslovakia) Miloslav Mečíř (quarterfinals)

== Draw ==
Key

- Q = Qualifier
- WC = Wild card
- LL = Lucky loser
- Alt = Alternate
- ITF = ITF entry
- PR = Protected ranking
- SR = Special ranking
- SE = Special exempt
- JE = Junior exempt
- JR = Junior Accelerator Programme entrant
- CO = College Accelerator Programme entrant
- NG = Next Gen Accelerator Program entrant
- w/o = Walkover
- r = Retired
- d = Defaulted
- NB: The Final was the best of 5 sets while all other rounds were the best of 3 sets.

=== Final ===
Final
	(France) Guy Forget	2	1	1
2	(United States) **Michael Chang**	**6**	**6**	**6**

=== Section 1 ===
First round
1	(United States) **J McEnroe**	**6**	**6**
(United States) S Davis	3	3
(West Germany) **E Jelen**	**7**	**6**
Q	(South Africa) W Green	5	1
(Israel) **A Mansdorf**	**6**	**6**
Q	(West Germany) C Saceanu	3	3
(South Africa) C van Rensburg	6	**6**	1
8	(Czechoslovakia) **M Mečíř**	**7**	1	**6**
4	(United States) J Connors	**6**	4	6
(Soviet Union) **A Volkov**	3	**6**	**7**
WC	(United Kingdom) A Castle	1	4
(United States) **R Seguso**	**6**	**6**
(France) **G Forget**	**6**	**6**
(Australia) J Fitzgerald	3	2
(Soviet Union) A Cherkasov	6	4
6	(United States) **K Curren**	**7**	**6**

Second round
1	(United States) **J McEnroe**	**6**	**6**
(West Germany) E Jelen	4	1
(Israel) A Mansdorf	4	5
8	(Czechoslovakia) **M Mečíř**	**6**	**7**
(Soviet Union) A Volkov	4	**6**	6
(United States) **R Seguso**	**6**	1	**7**
(France) **G Forget**	**7**	**6**
6	(United States) K Curren	6	4

Quarterfinals
1	(United States) **J McEnroe**	2	**6**	**6**
8	(Czechoslovakia) M Mečíř	**6**	4	3
(United States) R Seguso	5	3
(France) **G Forget**	**7**	**6**

Semifinals
1	(United States) J McEnroe	4	6
(France) **G Forget**	**6**	**7**

=== Section 2 ===
First round
5	(Switzerland) J Hlasek	0	**6**	3
(Czechoslovakia) **M Střelba**	**6**	2	**6**
(Australia) **W Masur**	**6**	**6**
(New Zealand) K Evernden	1	2
WC	(United Kingdom) C Bailey	6	5
(United States) **L Shiras**	**7**	**7**
(South Africa) P Aldrich	0	1
3	(United States) **B Gilbert**	**6**	**6**
7	(Soviet Union) **A Chesnokov**	4	**7**	**6**
Q	(United Kingdom) N Brown	**6**	5	2
(West Germany) **M Stich**	**6**	5	**6**
Q	(United States) K Flach	4	**7**	3
(United States) **P Annacone**	**7**	**6**
(France) H Leconte	6	1
(United States) D Goldie	1	1
2	(United States) **M Chang**	**6**	**6**

Second round
(Czechoslovakia) M Střelba	6	1
(Australia) **W Masur**	**7**	**6**
(United States) L Shiras	5	3
3	(United States) **B Gilbert**	**7**	**6**
7	(Soviet Union) **A Chesnokov**	**7**	**6**
(West Germany) M Stich	5	2
(United States) P Annacone	2	**6**	0
2	(United States) **M Chang**	**6**	1	**6**

Quarterfinals
(Australia) **W Masur**	**7**	3	**6**
3	(United States) B Gilbert	6	**6**	3
7	(Soviet Union) A Chesnokov	3	4
2	(United States) **M Chang**	**6**	**6**

Semifinals
(Australia) W Masur	6	1
2	(United States) **M Chang**	**7**	**6**
