= 1987 Benson & Hedges Championships – Singles =

Singles
- 1987 Benson & Hedges Championships

Final
- Champion: (Czechoslovakia) Ivan Lendl
- Runner-up: (Sweden) Anders Järryd
- Score: 6–3, 6–2, 7–5

Details
- Draw: 32 (3WC/4Q/1LL)
- Seeds: 8

Events
| Singles | Doubles |
- Wembley Championships

Yannick Noah was the defending champions, but did not compete this year.

Ivan Lendl won the title by defeating Anders Järryd 6–3, 6–2, 7–5 in the final.

== Seeds ==
1. (Czechoslovakia) Ivan Lendl (champion)
2. (Czechoslovakia) Miloslav Mečíř (quarterfinals)
3. (Australia) Pat Cash (quarterfinals)
4. (Sweden) Joakim Nyström (first round)
5. (Sweden) Anders Järryd (final)
6. (Israel) Amos Mansdorf (quarterfinals)
7. (Switzerland) Jakob Hlasek (semifinals)
8. (South Africa) Christo van Rensburg (second round)

== Draw ==
Key

- Q = Qualifier
- WC = Wild card
- LL = Lucky loser
- Alt = Alternate
- ITF = ITF entry
- PR = Protected ranking
- SR = Special ranking
- SE = Special exempt
- JE = Junior exempt
- JR = Junior Accelerator Programme entrant
- CO = College Accelerator Programme entrant
- NG = Next Gen Accelerator Program entrant
- w/o = Walkover
- r = Retired
- d = Defaulted

=== Finals ===
Semifinals
1 | (Czechoslovakia) Ivan Lendl | 6 | 7
(France) Henri Leconte | 4 | 6
5 | (Sweden) Anders Järryd | 7 | 6
7 | (Switzerland) Jakob Hlasek | 6 | 1

Final
1 | (Czechoslovakia) Ivan Lendl | 6 | 6 | 7
5 | (Sweden) Anders Järryd | 3 | 2 | 5

=== Top half ===
First round
1 | (Czechoslovakia) I Lendl | 6 | 6
(Haiti) R Agénor | 2 | 1
Q | (Soviet Union) A Volkov | 6 | 4 | 6
Q | (United States) P Fleming | 2 | 6 | 2
WC | (United Kingdom) J Bates | 6 | 5 | 4
(United States) P Annacone | 2 | 7 | 6
(Australia) P Doohan | 5 | 1
8 | (South Africa) C van Rensburg | 7 | 6
4 | (Sweden) J Nyström | 2 | 7 | 1
(Czechoslovakia) M Šrejber | 6 | 6 | 6
(France) H Leconte | 6 | 7
(United States) K Curren | 3 | 6
(Czechoslovakia) T Šmíd | 6 | 3 | 3
Q | (United States) R Leach | 3 | 6 | 6
LL | (Nigeria) T Mmoh | 2 | 6
6 | (Israel) A Mansdorf | 6 | 7

Second round
1 | (Czechoslovakia) I Lendl | 6 | 6
Q | (Soviet Union) A Volkov | 4 | 3
(United States) P Annacone | 6 | 6
8 | (South Africa) C van Rensburg | 2 | 2
(Czechoslovakia) M Šrejber | 3 | 6
(France) H Leconte | 6 | 7
Q | (United States) R Leach | 3 | 7 | 2
6 | (Israel) A Mansdorf | 6 | 5 | 6

Quarterfinals
1 | (Czechoslovakia) I Lendl | 3 | 6 | 6
(United States) P Annacone | 6 | 3 | 4
(France) H Leconte | 6 | 7 | 6
6 | (Israel) A Mansdorf | 7 | 6 | 3

Semifinals
1 | (Czechoslovakia) I Lendl | 6 | 7
(France) H Leconte | 4 | 6

=== Bottom half ===
First round
5 | (Sweden) A Järryd | 6 | 6
(France) G Forget | 4 | 3
(Switzerland) C Mezzadri | 6 | 6 | 6
WC | (United Kingdom) A Castle | 7 | 4 | 4
(Sweden) M Pernfors | 3 | 5
(Soviet Union) A Chesnokov | 6 | 7
(Sweden) J Svensson | 5 | 6
3 | (Australia) P Cash | 7 | 7
7 | (Switzerland) J Hlasek | 7 | 6
(Czechoslovakia) K Nováček | 6 | 4
WC | (United Kingdom) S Bale | 5 | 3
(Sweden) J Gunnarsson | 7 | 6
Q | (Czechoslovakia) S Birner | 2 | 6 | 4
(United States) J Kriek | 6 | 3 | 6
(New Zealand) K Evernden | 2 | 4
2 | (Czechoslovakia) M Mečíř | 6 | 6

Second round
5 | (Sweden) A Järryd | 6 | 6
(Switzerland) C Mezzadri | 4 | 3
(Soviet Union) A Chesnokov | 4 | 6 | 3
3 | (Australia) P Cash | 6 | 3 | 6
7 | (Switzerland) J Hlasek | 7 | 6
(Sweden) J Gunnarsson | 5 | 0
(United States) J Kriek | 6 | 4
2 | (Czechoslovakia) M Mečíř | 7 | 6

Quarterfinals
5 | (Sweden) A Järryd | 3 | 7 | 6
3 | (Australia) P Cash | 6 | 6 | 2
7 | (Switzerland) J Hlasek | 6 | 6
2 | (Czechoslovakia) M Mečíř | 3 | 3

Semifinals
5 | (Sweden) A Järryd | 7 | 6
7 | (Switzerland) J Hlasek | 6 | 1
