= 1988 Benson & Hedges Championships =

- Date: 8–13 November
- Edition: 13th
- Draw: 32S / 16D
- Prize money: $335,000
- Surface: Carpet / indoor
- Location: London, England
- Venue: Wembley Arena

Champions

Singles
- (Switzerland) Jakob Hlasek

Doubles
- (United States) Ken Flach / (United States) Robert Seguso
- Wembley Championships

The 1988 Benson & Hedges Championships was a men's tennis tournament played on indoor carpet courts at the Wembley Arena in London, England that was part of the 1988 Nabisco Grand Prix. It was the 13th edition of the tournament and was held from 8 November until 13 November 1988. Fourth-seeded Jakob Hlasek won the singles title.

== Finals ==
=== Singles ===
(Switzerland) Jakob Hlasek defeated (Sweden) Jonas Svensson 6–7^{(4–7)}, 3–6, 6–4, 6–0, 7–5

- It was the first singles title of Hlasek's career.

=== Doubles ===
(United States) Ken Flach / (United States) Robert Seguso defeated (United States) Martin Davis / (Australia) Brad Drewett 7–5, 6–2
