= 1970 Embassy British Indoor Championships =

- Date: 16–21 November
- Edition: 3rd
- Category: Grand Prix
- Draw: 32S / 16D
- Surface: Carpet / indoor
- Location: London, England
- Venue: Wembley Arena

Champions

Men's singles
- (Australia) Rod Laver

Women's singles
- (United States) Billie Jean King

Men's doubles
- (Australia) Ken Rosewall / (United States) Stan Smith

Women's doubles
- (United States) Rosie Casals / (United States) Billie Jean King
← 1969 ·	Wembley Championships	· 1971 →

The 1970 Embassy British Indoor Championships was a combined men's and women's Grand Prix tennis tournament played on indoor carpet courts. It was the 3rd edition of the British Indoor Championships in the Open era. The tournament took place at the Wembley Arena in London in England and ran from 16 November until 21 November 1970.

The men's singles event and the $7,200 first prize was won by first–seeded Rod Laver while Billie Jean King won the women's singles title.

== Finals ==
=== Men's singles ===
(Australia) Rod Laver defeated (United States) Cliff Richey 6–3, 6–4, 6–4

- It was Laver's 14th title of the year and the 46th of his open era career.

=== Women's singles ===
(United States) Billie Jean King defeated (United Kingdom) Ann Jones 8–6, 3–6, 6–1

=== Men's doubles ===
(Australia) Ken Rosewall / (United States) Stan Smith defeated (Romania) Ilie Năstase / (Romania) Ion Țiriac 6–4, 6–3, 6–2

=== Women's doubles ===
(United States) Rosie Casals / (United States) Billie Jean King defeated (United Kingdom) Ann Jones / (United Kingdom) Virginia Wade 6–3, 7–5
