= 1980 Benson & Hedges Championships – Doubles =

Doubles
- 1980 Benson & Hedges Championships

Final
- Champion: (United States) Peter Fleming (United States) John McEnroe
- Runner-up: (United States) Bill Scanlon (United States) Eliot Teltscher
- Score: 7–5, 6–3

Details
- Draw: 16
- Seeds: 4

Events
Singles	Doubles
- Wembley Championships

The 1980 Benson & Hedges Championships – Doubles was an event of the 1980 Benson & Hedges Championships tennis tournament and was played on iindoor carpet courts at the Wembley Arena in London in the United Kingdom, between 11 November and 16 November 1980. The draw consisted of 16 teams and four of them were seeded. The first-seeded team of Peter Fleming and John McEnroe were the defending Wembley Championships doubles champions and retained the singles title after a straight-sets win in the final against unseeded pairing Bill Scanlon and Eliot Teltscher, 7–5, 6–3.

== Seeds ==
1. (United States) Peter Fleming / (United States) John McEnroe (champions)
2. (United States) Bob Lutz / (United States) Stan Smith (quarterfinals)
3. (United States) Gene Mayer / (United States) Sandy Mayer (semifinals)
4. (United States) Brian Gottfried / (South Africa) Frew McMillan (first round)

== Draw ==
Key

- Q = Qualifier
- WC = Wild card
- LL = Lucky loser
- Alt = Alternate
- ITF = ITF entry
- PR = Protected ranking
- SR = Special ranking
- SE = Special exempt
- JE = Junior exempt
- JR = Junior Accelerator Programme entrant
- CO = College Accelerator Programme entrant
- NG = Next Gen Accelerator Program entrant
- w/o = Walkover
- r = Retired
- d = Defaulted

First Round
1	(United States) Peter Fleming (United States) John McEnroe	4	6	6
(Poland) Wojciech Fibak (Czechoslovakia) Tomáš Šmíd	6	4	1
(United States) Kevin Curren (United States) Steve Denton	6	6	6
(United Kingdom) Colin Dowdeswell (United Kingdom) Richard Lewis	1	7	3
(Switzerland) Heinz Günthardt (Australia) Paul McNamee	6	6
4	(United States) Brian Gottfried (South Africa) Frew McMillan	3	2
(Australia) Colin Dibley (Australia) Paul Kronk	6	3	6
(United States) Richard Meyer (France) Christophe Roger-Vasselin	2	6	1
(United States) Johan Kriek (South Africa) Bernard Mitton	4	6	7
(Romania) Ilie Năstase (Italy) Gianni Ocleppo	6	4	5
3	(United States) Gene Mayer (United States) Sandy Mayer	6	6
(United States) Victor Amaya (United States) Hank Pfister	2	1
(United States) Bill Scanlon (United States) Eliot Teltscher	6	6
(Zimbabwe) Andrew Pattison (United States) Butch Walts	2	4
(United States) Billy Martin (New Zealand) Russell Simpson	3	4
2	(United States) Bob Lutz (United States) Stan Smith	6	6

Quarterfinals
1	(United States) Peter Fleming (United States) John McEnroe	6	7
(United States) Kevin Curren (United States) Steve Denton	4	6
(Switzerland) Heinz Günthardt (Australia) Paul McNamee	6	1	4
(Australia) Colin Dibley (Australia) Paul Kronk	4	6	6
(United States) Johan Kriek (South Africa) Bernard Mitton
3	(United States) Gene Mayer (United States) Sandy Mayer	w/o
(United States) Bill Scanlon (United States) Eliot Teltscher	6	6
2	(United States) Bob Lutz (United States) Stan Smith	4	2

Semifinals
1	(United States) Peter Fleming (United States) John McEnroe	6	6
(Australia) Colin Dibley (Australia) Paul Kronk	1	0
3	(United States) Gene Mayer (United States) Sandy Mayer	5	7	3
(United States) Bill Scanlon (United States) Eliot Teltscher	7	5	6

Final
1	(United States) Peter Fleming (United States) John McEnroe	7	6
(United States) Bill Scanlon (United States) Eliot Teltscher	5	3
