= 1989 Benson & Hedges Championships =

- Date: 7–12 November
- Edition: 14th
- Category: Grand Prix circuit
- Draw: 32S / 16D
- Prize money: $400,000
- Surface: Carpet / indoors
- Location: London, England
- Venue: Wembley Arena

Champions

Singles
- (United States) Michael Chang

Doubles
- (Switzerland) Jakob Hlasek / (United States) John McEnroe
- Wembley Championships

The 1989 Benson & Hedges Championships was a men's tennis tournament played on indoor carpet courts at the Wembley Arena in London, England that was part of the 1989 Nabisco Grand Prix. It was the 14th edition of the tournament and was held from 7 November until 12 November 1989. Second-seeded Michael Chang won the singles title.

== Finals ==
=== Singles ===
(United States) Michael Chang defeated (France) Guy Forget 6–2, 6–1, 6–1

- It was Chang's 2nd title of the year and the 3rd of his career.

=== Doubles ===
(Switzerland) Jakob Hlasek / (United States) John McEnroe defeated (United Kingdom) Jeremy Bates / (United States) Kevin Curren 6–1, 7–6

- It was Hlasek's 5th title of the year and the 11th of his career. It was McEnroe's 6th title of the year and the 142nd of his career.
