= 1969 Wills Open British Covered Court Championships – Men's singles =

Men's singles
- 1969 Wills Open British Covered Court Championships

Final
- Champion: (Australia) Rod Laver
- Runner-up: (Australia) Tony Roche
- Score: 6–4, 6–1, 6–3

Details
- Draw: 32

Events
Singles	men	women
Doubles	men	women
← 1968 ·	Wembley Championships	· 1970 →

The 1969 Wills Open British Covered Court Championships – Men's singles was an event of the 1969 Wills Open British Covered Court Championships tennis tournament and was played on indoor carpet courts at the Wembley Arena in London in the United Kingdom between 17 November and 22 November 1969. The draw consisted of 32 players. Ken Rosewall was the reigning singles champion but did not take part in this edition. Rod Laver won the singles title by defeating Tony Roche in the final, 6–4, 6–1, 6–3.

== Draw ==
=== Key ===
- Q = Qualifier
- WC = Wild card
- LL = Lucky loser
- Alt = Alternate
- ITF = ITF entry
- PR = Protected ranking
- SR = Special ranking
- SE = Special exempt
- JE = Junior exempt
- JR = Junior Accelerator Programme entrant
- CO = College Accelerator Programme entrant
- NG = Next Gen Accelerator Program entrant
- w/o = Walkover
- r = Retired
- d = Defaulted

=== Finals ===
Semifinals
(Australia) Rod Laver	8	6
(Netherlands) Tom Okker	6	2
(United States) Butch Buchholz	3	9	13
(Australia) Tony Roche	6	7	15

Final
(Australia) Rod Laver	6	6	6
(Australia) Tony Roche	4	1	3

=== Top half ===
First Round
(Australia) Rod Laver	6	6
(United States) Marty Riessen	4	4
(United Kingdom) John Clifton	7	6	6
(Denmark) Torben Ulrich	9	3	2
(United Kingdom) Roger Taylor	7	6	19
(Australia) Fred Stolle	9	4	17
(Australia) Owen Davidson	6	6
(United States) Charlie Pasarell	4	1
(Netherlands) Tom Okker	6	19	6
(United Kingdom) Mark Cox	2	21	4
(United Kingdom) Stephen Warboys	6	6
(United Kingdom) Gerald Battrick	3	4
(United States) Pancho Gonzales	6	6
(West Germany) Hans-Joachim Plötz	3	2
(United Kingdom) David Lloyd	3	6	6
(United States) Ronald Holmberg	6	3	2

Second Round
(Australia) Rod Laver	6	6
(United Kingdom) John Clifton	0	1
(United Kingdom) Roger Taylor	3	6	6
(Australia) Owen Davidson	6	3	4
(Netherlands) Tom Okker	6	6
(United Kingdom) Stephen Warboys	1	1
(United States) Pancho Gonzales	7	5	6
(United Kingdom) David Lloyd	5	7	4

Quarterfinals
(Australia) Rod Laver	16	10
(United Kingdom) Roger Taylor	14	8
(Netherlands) Tom Okker	6	6
(United States) Pancho Gonzales	1	2

Semifinals
(Australia) Rod Laver	8	6
(Netherlands) Tom Okker	6	2

=== Bottom half ===
First Round
(United States) Butch Buchholz	7	8
(United Kingdom) Bobby Wilson	5	6
(Australia) Roy Emerson	11	6
(Romania) Ion Țiriac	9	3
(United Kingdom) Graham Stilwell	6	6
(South Africa) Raymond Moore	2	2
(Egypt) Ismail El Shafei	w/o
(Australia) John Newcombe
(Socialist Federal Republic of Yugoslavia) Nikola Pilić	11	11
(Spain) Andrés Gimeno	9	9
(United States) Stan Smith	3	6	6
(South Africa) Cliff Drysdale	6	3	4
(South Africa) Bob Hewitt	6	7
(France) Pierre Barthès	4	5
(Australia) Tony Roche	6	6
(Romania) Ilie Năstase	4	3

Second Round
(United States) Butch Buchholz	6	7
(Australia) Roy Emerson	2	5
(United Kingdom) Graham Stilwell	3	6	6
(Egypt) Ismail El Shafei	6	3	4
(Socialist Federal Republic of Yugoslavia) Nikola Pilić	6	3	4
(United States) Stan Smith	3	6	6
(South Africa) Bob Hewitt	5	2
(Australia) Tony Roche	7	6

Quarterfinals
(United States) Butch Buchholz	3	6	6
(United Kingdom) Graham Stilwell	6	1	4
(United States) Stan Smith	3	10	4
(Australia) Tony Roche	6	8	6

Semifinals
(United States) Butch Buchholz	3	9	13
(Australia) Tony Roche	6	7	15
