= 1982 Benson & Hedges Championships – Singles =

Singles
- 1982 Benson & Hedges Championships

Final
- Champion: (United States) John McEnroe
- Runner-up: (United States) Brian Gottfried
- Score: 6–3, 6–2, 6–4

Details
- Draw: 32
- Seeds: 8

Events
Singles	Doubles
- Wembley Championships

The 1982 Benson & Hedges Championships – Singles was an event of the 1982 Benson & Hedges Championships tennis tournament and was played on indoor carpet courts at the Wembley Arena in London in the United Kingdom, between 8 November and 14 November 1982. The draw comprised 32 players and eight of them were seeded. Jimmy Connors was the defending Wembley Championships singles champion but did not compete in this edition. First-seeded John McEnroe won the singles title after a straight-sets win in the final against sixth-seeded Brian Gottfried, 6–3, 6–2, 6–4.

== Seeds ==
1. (United States) John McEnroe (champion)
2. (Sweden) Mats Wilander (first round)
3. (United States) Steve Denton (semifinals)
4. (Ecuador) Andrés Gómez (quarterfinals)
5. (United States) Brian Teacher (second round, retired)
6. (United States) Brian Gottfried (final)
7. (Israel) Shlomo Glickstein (second round)
8. (Czechoslovakia) Tomáš Šmíd (quarterfinals)

== Draw ==
Key

- Q = Qualifier
- WC = Wild card
- LL = Lucky loser
- Alt = Alternate
- ITF = ITF entry
- PR = Protected ranking
- SR = Special ranking
- SE = Special exempt
- JE = Junior exempt
- JR = Junior Accelerator Programme entrant
- CO = College Accelerator Programme entrant
- NG = Next Gen Accelerator Program entrant
- w/o = Walkover
- r = Retired
- d = Defaulted

=== Finals ===
Semifinals
1	(United States) John McEnroe	6	6
3	(United States) Steve Denton	1	4
6	(United States) Brian Gottfried	7	6
(United States) Vincent Van Patten	5	1

Final
1	(United States) John McEnroe	6	6	6
6	(United States) Brian Gottfried	3	2	4

=== Top half ===
First Round
1	(United States) John McEnroe	7	6
(Italy) Claudio Panatta	5	2
(United States) Mark Dickson	6	7
(New Zealand) Russell Simpson	4	6
(France) Henri Leconte	6	6
(United States) Bruce Manson	2	4
(United States) Eric Fromm	5	0
5	(United States) Brian Teacher	7	6
3	(United States) Steve Denton	1	6	9
(Sweden) Anders Järryd	6	4	7
(United States) Victor Amaya	6	6
Q	(India) Ramesh Krishnan	3	2
Q	(France) Pascal Portes	6	3	4
(United States) Chip Hooper	1	6	6
(United States) Tim Gullikson	6	0	2
8	(Czechoslovakia) Tomáš Šmíd	4	6	6

Second Round
1	(United States) John McEnroe	6	6
(United States) Mark Dickson	3	4
(France) Henri Leconte	6	1
5	(United States) Brian Teacher	3	0^{r}
3	(United States) Steve Denton	7	7
(United States) Victor Amaya	6	6
(United States) Chip Hooper	6	1
8	(Czechoslovakia) Tomáš Šmíd	7	6

Quarterfinals
1	(United States) John McEnroe	6	7
(France) Henri Leconte	3	5
3	(United States) Steve Denton	4	7	6
8	(Czechoslovakia) Tomáš Šmíd	6	6	4

Semifinals
1	(United States) John McEnroe	6	6
3	(United States) Steve Denton	1	4

=== Bottom half ===
First Round
6	(United States) Brian Gottfried	7	6
(United States) Mel Purcell	6	3
(Nigeria) Nduka Odizor	6	6
(Switzerland) Heinz Günthardt	4	4
(United Kingdom) Andrew Jarrett	2	2
(United States) Tom Gullikson	6	6
Q	(United States) Randy Druz	4	2
4	(Ecuador) Andrés Gómez	6	6
7	(Israel) Shlomo Glickstein	7	6
(United Kingdom) Richard Lewis	5	2
(United States) Bill Scanlon	4	6	1
(United States) Vincent Van Patten	6	3	6
Q	(United Kingdom) Colin Dowdeswell	7	3	9
(United States) Roscoe Tanner	6	6	7
(Poland) Wojciech Fibak	6	3	7
2	(Sweden) Mats Wilander	2	6	5

Second Round
6	(United States) Brian Gottfried	6	6
(Nigeria) Nduka Odizor	1	1
(United States) Tom Gullikson	7	6	1
4	(Ecuador) Andrés Gómez	5	7	6
7	(Israel) Shlomo Glickstein	2	2
(United States) Vincent Van Patten	6	6
Q	(United Kingdom) Colin Dowdeswell	4	4
(Poland) Wojciech Fibak	6	6

Quarterfinals
6	(United States) Brian Gottfried	7	6
4	(Ecuador) Andrés Gómez	6	2
(United States) Vincent Van Patten	7	6
(Poland) Wojciech Fibak	6	4

Semifinals
6	(United States) Brian Gottfried	7	6
(United States) Vincent Van Patten	5	1
