= 1981 Benson & Hedges Championships – Singles =

Singles
- 1981 Benson & Hedges Championships

Final
- Champion: (United States) Jimmy Connors
- Runner-up: (United States) John McEnroe
- Score: 6–4, 6–3, 6–3

Details
- Draw: 32
- Seeds: 8

Events
Singles	Doubles
- Wembley Championships

The 1981 Benson & Hedges Championships – Singles was an event of the 1981 Benson & Hedges Championships tennis tournament and was played on iindoor carpet courts at the Wembley Arena in London in the United Kingdom, between 9 November and 14 November 1981. The draw comprised 32 players and eight of them were seeded. First-seeded John McEnroe was the defending Wembley Championships singles champion but lost in the final in straight sets to second-seeded Jimmy Connors, 6–4, 6–3, 6–3.

== Seeds ==
1. (United States) John McEnroe (final)
2. (United States) Jimmy Connors (champion)
3. (United States) Roscoe Tanner (quarterfinals)
4. (France) Yannick Noah (semifinals)
5. (United States) Brian Gottfried (quarterfinals)
6. (United States) Stan Smith (first round)
7. (Czechoslovakia) Tomáš Šmíd (first round)
8. (United States) Sandy Mayer (semifinals)

== Draw ==
Key

- Q = Qualifier
- WC = Wild card
- LL = Lucky loser
- Alt = Alternate
- ITF = ITF entry
- PR = Protected ranking
- SR = Special ranking
- SE = Special exempt
- JE = Junior exempt
- JR = Junior Accelerator Programme entrant
- CO = College Accelerator Programme entrant
- NG = Next Gen Accelerator Program entrant
- w/o = Walkover
- r = Retired
- d = Defaulted

=== Finals ===
Semifinals
1	(United States) John McEnroe	6	6
8	(United States) Sandy Mayer	3	3
4	(France) Yannick Noah	3	3
2	(United States) Jimmy Connors	6	6

Final
1	(United States) John McEnroe	6	6	3	4	2
2	(United States) Jimmy Connors	3	2	6	6	6

=== Top half ===
First Round
1	(United States) John McEnroe	6	6
(United Kingdom) John Feaver	1	1
(Czechoslovakia) Stanislav Birner	7	6
(Switzerland) Heinz Günthardt	6	2
(United States) Jeff Borowiak	6	3	2
(United States) Tim Wilkison	2	6	6
(France) Thierry Tulasne	7	2	3
5	(United States) Brian Gottfried	5	6	6
3	(United States) Roscoe Tanner	6	6
(France) Gilles Moretton	1	2
(United States) Tim Mayotte	6	6
(United States) Bob Lutz	4	1
(United States) Peter Fleming	7	6	4
(United Kingdom) Jonathan Smith	6	7	6
(Italy) Gianni Ocleppo	3	6	1
8	(United States) Sandy Mayer	6	3	6

Second Round
1	(United States) John McEnroe	6	6
(Czechoslovakia) Stanislav Birner	2	2
(United States) Tim Wilkison	4	3
5	(United States) Brian Gottfried	6	6
3	(United States) Roscoe Tanner	6	6
(United States) Tim Mayotte	1	4
(United Kingdom) Jonathan Smith	3	0
8	(United States) Sandy Mayer	6	6

Quarterfinals
1	(United States) John McEnroe	6	6
5	(United States) Brian Gottfried	1	2
3	(United States) Roscoe Tanner	4	7	1
8	(United States) Sandy Mayer	6	5	6

Semifinals
1	(United States) John McEnroe	6	6
8	(United States) Sandy Mayer	3	3

=== Bottom half ===
First Round
7	(Czechoslovakia) Tomáš Šmíd	5	1
(United States) Victor Amaya	7	6
(Romania) Ilie Năstase	4	1
(United Kingdom) Richard Lewis	6	6
(United States) Sammy Giammalva Jr.	7	2	2
(United States) Peter Rennert	6	6	6
(United States) Richard Meyer	6	3
4	(France) Yannick Noah	7	6
6	(United States) Stan Smith	3	2
(New Zealand) Russell Simpson	6	6
(Israel) Shlomo Glickstein	6	6
(United States) Hank Pfister	3	2
(United States) Nick Saviano	2	7	4
(United States) Tony Giammalva	6	6	6
(United States) Tom Gullikson	4	2
2	(United States) Jimmy Connors	6	6

Second Round
(United States) Victor Amaya	5	3
(United Kingdom) Richard Lewis	7	6
(United States) Peter Rennert	3	3
4	(France) Yannick Noah	6	6
(New Zealand) Russell Simpson	5	3
(Israel) Shlomo Glickstein	7	6
(United States) Tony Giammalva	3	0
2	(United States) Jimmy Connors	6	6

Quarterfinals
(United Kingdom) Richard Lewis	3	2
4	(France) Yannick Noah	6	6
(Israel) Shlomo Glickstein	4	0
2	(United States) Jimmy Connors	6	6

Semifinals
4	(France) Yannick Noah	3	3
2	(United States) Jimmy Connors	6	6
