= 1980 Benson & Hedges Championships – Singles =

Singles
- 1980 Benson & Hedges Championships

Final
- Champion: (United States) John McEnroe
- Runner-up: (United States) Gene Mayer
- Score: 6–4, 6–3, 6–3

Details
- Draw: 32
- Seeds: 8

Events
Singles	Doubles
- Wembley Championships

The 1980 Benson & Hedges Championships – Singles was an event of the 1980 Benson & Hedges Championships tennis tournament and was played on iindoor carpet courts at the Wembley Arena in London in the United Kingdom, between 11 November and 16 November 1980. The draw comprised 32 players and eight of them were seeded. First-seeded John McEnroe was the defending Wembley Championships singles champion and retained the singles title after a win in the final against second-seeded Gene Mayer, 6–4, 6–3, 6–3.

== Seeds ==
1. (United States) John McEnroe (champion)
2. (United States) Gene Mayer (final)
3. (United States) Harold Solomon (semifinals)
4. (United States) Brian Gottfried (second round)
5. (United States) Eliot Teltscher (first round)
6. (United States) Eddie Dibbs (second round)
7. (Poland) Wojciech Fibak (second round)
8. (United States) Victor Amaya (second round)

== Draw ==
Key

- Q = Qualifier
- WC = Wild card
- LL = Lucky loser
- Alt = Alternate
- ITF = ITF entry
- PR = Protected ranking
- SR = Special ranking
- SE = Special exempt
- JE = Junior exempt
- JR = Junior Accelerator Programme entrant
- CO = College Accelerator Programme entrant
- NG = Next Gen Accelerator Program entrant
- w/o = Walkover
- r = Retired
- d = Defaulted

=== Finals ===
Semifinals
1	(United States) John McEnroe	6	6
3	(United States) Harold Solomon	3	2
(United States) Stan Smith	0	4
2	(United States) Gene Mayer	6	6

Final
1	(United States) John McEnroe	6	6	6
2	(United States) Gene Mayer	4	3	3

=== Top half ===
First Round
1	(United States) John McEnroe	6	6
(United States) Trey Waltke	1	1
(United States) Bob Lutz	7	6
Q	(United States) Billy Martin	6	4
Q	(United States) Richard Meyer	6	6	6
(United Kingdom) Mark Cox	2	7	3
7	(Poland) Wojciech Fibak	6	6
(France) Christophe Roger-Vasselin	4	4
3	(United States) Harold Solomon	4	6	6
(Switzerland) Heinz Günthardt	6	2	4
(United States) Sandy Mayer	7	6
(Romania) Ilie Năstase	5	2
(Czechoslovakia) Tomáš Šmíd	6	6
(United Kingdom) Roger Taylor	3	2
(Australia) Colin Dibley	7	3	10
5	(United States) Eliot Teltscher	5	6	8

Second Round
1	(United States) John McEnroe	6	6
(United States) Bob Lutz	2	1
Q	(United States) Richard Meyer	2	7	6
7	(Poland) Wojciech Fibak	6	6	4
3	(United States) Harold Solomon	5	6	6
(United States) Sandy Mayer	7	4	3
(Czechoslovakia) Tomáš Šmíd	6	6
(Australia) Colin Dibley	2	4

Quarterfinals
1	(United States) John McEnroe	6	6
Q	(United States) Richard Meyer	3	3
3	(United States) Harold Solomon	7	1	6
(Czechoslovakia) Tomáš Šmíd	5	6	3

Semifinals
1	(United States) John McEnroe	6	6
3	(United States) Harold Solomon	3	2

=== Bottom half ===
First Round
6	(United States) Eddie Dibbs	6	6
(United States) Robert Van't Hof	2	2
(United States) Butch Walts	6	6
(United States) Hank Pfister	4	0
(United States) Stan Smith	4	6	6
(United States) Bill Scanlon	6	3	0
4	(United States) Brian Gottfried	6	4	7
(South Africa) Bernard Mitton	1	6	5
8	(United States) Victor Amaya	7	7
(Zimbabwe) Andrew Pattison	6	5
(Australia) Paul McNamee	6	6
(Italy) Gianni Ocleppo	4	4
(United States) Johan Kriek	6	6	6
(Israel) Shlomo Glickstein	3	7	2
2	(United States) Gene Mayer	6	6
(Australia) Paul Kronk	0	1

Second Round
6	(United States) Eddie Dibbs	3	1
(United States) Butch Walts	6	6
(United States) Stan Smith	5	7	6
4	(United States) Brian Gottfried	7	6	4
8	(United States) Victor Amaya	4	4
(Australia) Paul McNamee	6	6
(United States) Johan Kriek	3	1
2	(United States) Gene Mayer	6	6

Quarterfinals
(United States) Butch Walts	1	3
(United States) Stan Smith	6	6
(Australia) Paul McNamee	2	3
2	(United States) Gene Mayer	6	6

Semifinals
(United States) Stan Smith	0	4
2	(United States) Gene Mayer	6	6
