= 1981 Benson & Hedges Championships – Doubles =

Doubles
- 1981 Benson & Hedges Championships

Final
- Champion: (United States) Ferdi Taygan (United States) Sherwood Stewart
- Runner-up: (United States) Peter Fleming (United States) John McEnroe
- Score: 7–5, 6–7, 6–4

Details
- Draw: 16
- Seeds: 4

Events
Singles	Doubles
- Wembley Championships

The 1981 Benson & Hedges Championships – Doubles was an event of the 1981 Benson & Hedges Championships tennis tournament and was played on indoor carpet courts at the Wembley Arena in London in the United Kingdom, between 11 November and 16 November 1981. The draw consisted of 16 teams and four of them were seeded. The first-seeded team of Peter Fleming and John McEnroe were the defending Wembley Championships doubles champions but lost in the final in three sets to the third-seeded pairing Ferdi Taygan and Sherwood Stewart, 7–5, 6–7, 6–4.

== Seeds ==
1. (United States) Peter Fleming / (United States) John McEnroe (Final)
2. (Switzerland) Heinz Günthardt / (Hungary) Balázs Taróczy (Semifinals)
3. (United States) Sherwood Stewart / (United States) Ferdi Taygan (Champions)
4. (United States) Brian Gottfried / (United States) Bob Lutz (Quarterfinals)

== Draw ==
Key

- Q = Qualifier
- WC = Wild card
- LL = Lucky loser
- Alt = Alternate
- ITF = ITF entry
- PR = Protected ranking
- SR = Special ranking
- SE = Special exempt
- JE = Junior exempt
- JR = Junior Accelerator Programme entrant
- CO = College Accelerator Programme entrant
- NG = Next Gen Accelerator Program entrant
- w/o = Walkover
- r = Retired
- d = Defaulted

First Round
1	(United States) Peter Fleming (United States) John McEnroe	6	6
(United States) Sandy Mayer (South Africa) Frew McMillan	3	4
(United States) Tracy Delatte (United States) Trey Waltke	7	7
(New Zealand) Russell Simpson (United States) Nick Saviano	6	5
4	(United States) Brian Gottfried (United States) Bob Lutz	6	6	6
(United States) Jeff Borowiak (United States) Walter Redondo	7	3	3
(United States) Tim Mayotte (United States) Tim Wilkison	7	6
(United States) Richard Meyer (Italy) Gianni Ocleppo	6	4
(United Kingdom) John Feaver (Israel) Shlomo Glickstein	4	6	6
(United States) Tony Giammalva (United States) Sammy Giammalva Jr.	6	3	2
3	(United States) Sherwood Stewart (United States) Ferdi Taygan	6	6
(India) Anand Amritraj (United States) Fred McNair	3	3
(United States) Victor Amaya (United States) Hank Pfister	6	6
(Sweden) Anders Järryd (United Kingdom) David Lloyd	1	2
(Czechoslovakia) Stanislav Birner (Czechoslovakia) Tomáš Šmíd	6	3	1
2	(Switzerland) Heinz Günthardt (Hungary) Balázs Taróczy	3	6	6

Quarterfinals
1	(United States) Peter Fleming (United States) John McEnroe	6	7
(United States) Tracy Delatte (United States) Trey Waltke	3	6
4	(United States) Brian Gottfried (United States) Bob Lutz	5	6
(United States) Tim Mayotte (United States) Tim Wilkison	7	7
(United Kingdom) John Feaver (Israel) Shlomo Glickstein	4	0
3	(United States) Sherwood Stewart (United States) Ferdi Taygan	6	6
(United States) Victor Amaya (United States) Hank Pfister	4	6	6
2	(Switzerland) Heinz Günthardt (Hungary) Balázs Taróczy	6	4	8

Semifinals
1	(United States) Peter Fleming (United States) John McEnroe	6	6
(United States) Tim Mayotte (United States) Tim Wilkison	4	4
3	(United States) Sherwood Stewart (United States) Ferdi Taygan	6	6	6
2	(Switzerland) Heinz Günthardt (Hungary) Balázs Taróczy	4	7	1

Final
1	(United States) Peter Fleming (United States) John McEnroe	5	7	4
3	(United States) Sherwood Stewart (United States) Ferdi Taygan	7	6	6
