= 1988 Benson & Hedges Championships – Singles =

Singles
- 1988 Benson & Hedges Championships

Final
- Champion: (Switzerland) Jakob Hlasek
- Runner-up: (Sweden) Jonas Svensson
- Score: 6–7^{(4–7)}, 3–6, 6–4, 6–0, 7–5

Details
- Draw: 32 (3WC/4Q/1LL/1SE)
- Seeds: 8

Events
Singles	Doubles
- Wembley Championships

Ivan Lendl was the defending champion, but did not compete this year.

Jakob Hlasek won the title by defeating Jonas Svensson 6–7^{(4–7)}, 3–6, 6–4, 6–0, 7–5 in the final.

== Seeds ==
1. (France) Henri Leconte (semifinals)
2. (United States) Brad Gilbert (second round)
3. (n/a)
4. (Switzerland) Jakob Hlasek (champion)
5. (Sweden) Jonas Svensson (final)
6. (Israel) Amos Mansdorf (quarterfinals)
7. (Haiti) Ronald Agénor (second round)
8. (Australia) John Fitzgerald (semifinals)

== Draw ==
Key

- Q = Qualifier
- WC = Wild card
- LL = Lucky loser
- Alt = Alternate
- ITF = ITF entry
- PR = Protected ranking
- SR = Special ranking
- SE = Special exempt
- JE = Junior exempt
- JR = Junior Accelerator Programme entrant
- CO = College Accelerator Programme entrant
- NG = Next Gen Accelerator Program entrant
- w/o = Walkover
- r = Retired
- d = Defaulted

=== Finals ===
Semifinals
1	(France) Henri Leconte	4	5
4	(Switzerland) Jakob Hlasek	6	7
5	(Sweden) Jonas Svensson	7	6
8	(Australia) John Fitzgerald	5	4

Final
4	(Switzerland) Jakob Hlasek	6^{4}	3	6	6	7
5	(Sweden) Jonas Svensson	7^{7}	6	4	0	5

=== Top half ===
First round
1	(France) H Leconte	7	6	6
(Australia) M Woodforde	5	7	4
(United States) J Kriek	2	3
Q	(Soviet Union) A Volkov	6	6
(Czechoslovakia) M Šrejber	7	3	6
(Netherlands) M Schapers	6	6	2
(Spain) S Casal	3	4
7	(Haiti) R Agénor	6	6
4	(Switzerland) J Hlasek	6	6
(Mexico) J Lozano	0	1
(Australia) W Masur	6	4	4
(United States) D Rostagno	4	6	6
(France) G Forget	7	3	9
WC	(United Kingdom) J Bates	5	6	11
(United States) J Grabb	3	6
6	(Israel) A Mansdorf	6	7

Second round
1	(France) H Leconte	6	6
Q	(Soviet Union) A Volkov	3	4
(Czechoslovakia) M Šrejber	7	3	6
7	(Haiti) R Agénor	6	6	2
4	(Switzerland) J Hlasek	6	6
(United States) D Rostagno	2	2
WC	(United Kingdom) J Bates	5	2
6	(Israel) A Mansdorf	7	6

Quarterfinals
1	(France) H Leconte	6	6	6
(Czechoslovakia) M Šrejber	4	7	2
4	(Switzerland) J Hlasek	4	6	6
6	(Israel) A Mansdorf	6	3	2

Semifinals
1	(France) H Leconte	4	5
4	(Switzerland) J Hlasek	6	7

=== Bottom half ===
First round
5	(Sweden) J Svensson	6	6
Q	(United States) M Davis	0	0
(West Germany) P Kühnen	6	6	6
(United States) J Pugh	7	3	4
SE	(United States) J Courier	6	7
(France) T Tulasne	2	5
Q	(United States) T Wilkison	6	6
LL	(West Germany) R Osterthun	3	2
8	(Australia) J Fitzgerald	6	6
(Czechoslovakia) M Vajda	4	1
Q	(West Germany) C Saceanu	6	6
(Australia) J Frawley	1	3
(Sweden) M Gustafsson	3	7	4
WC	(United States) R Seguso	6	5	6
WC	(United Kingdom) A Castle	4	4
2	(United States) B Gilbert	6	6

Second round
5	(Sweden) J Svensson	6	6
(West Germany) P Kühnen	4	1
SE	(United States) J Courier	6	6
Q	(United States) T Wilkison	3	3
8	(Australia) J Fitzgerald	5	6	6
Q	(West Germany) C Saceanu	7	1	3
WC	(United States) R Seguso	4	7	6
2	(United States) B Gilbert	6	6	4

Quarterfinals
5	(Sweden) J Svensson	6	6
SE	(United States) J Courier	3	0
8	(Australia) J Fitzgerald	6	3	6
WC	(United States) R Seguso	3	6	0

Semifinals
5	(Sweden) J Svensson	7	6
8	(Australia) J Fitzgerald	5	4
