= 1979 Benson & Hedges Championships – Singles =

Singles
- 1979 Benson & Hedges Championships

Final
- Champion: (United States) John McEnroe
- Runner-up: (United States) Harold Solomon
- Score: 6–3, 6–4, 7–5

Details
- Draw: 32
- Seeds: 8

Events
Singles	Doubles
- Wembley Championships

The 1979 Benson & Hedges Championships – Singles was an event of the 1979 Benson & Hedges Championships tennis tournament and was played on iindoor carpet courts at the Wembley Arena in London in the United Kingdom, between 13 November and 17 November 1979. The draw comprised 32 players and eight of them were seeded. First-seeded John McEnroe was the defending Wembley Championships singles champion and retained the singles title after a win in the final against third-seeded Harold Solomon, 6–3, 6–4, 7–5.

== Seeds ==
1. (United States) John McEnroe (champion)
2. (Argentina) Guillermo Vilas (second round)
3. (United States) Harold Solomon (final)
4. (United States) Peter Fleming (first round)
5. (Withdrew)
6. (United States) Tim Gullikson (quarterfinals)
7. (Poland) Wojciech Fibak (quarterfinals)

== Draw ==
Key

- Q = Qualifier
- WC = Wild card
- LL = Lucky loser
- Alt = Alternate
- ITF = ITF entry
- PR = Protected ranking
- SR = Special ranking
- SE = Special exempt
- JE = Junior exempt
- JR = Junior Accelerator Programme entrant
- CO = College Accelerator Programme entrant
- NG = Next Gen Accelerator Program entrant
- w/o = Walkover
- r = Retired
- d = Defaulted

=== Finals ===
Semifinals
1	(United States) John McEnroe	6	6
(Italy) Gianni Ocleppo	3	0
3	(United States) Harold Solomon	6	6
(United States) Hank Pfister	4	3

Final
1	(United States) John McEnroe	6	6	7
3	(United States) Harold Solomon	3	4	5

=== Top half ===
First Round
1	(United States) John McEnroe	6	6
(United Kingdom) John Lloyd	4	1
(United States) Tom Gorman	6	4	2
(United Kingdom) Robin Drysdale	4	6	6
(United States) Marty Riessen	6	6
(South Africa) Raymond Moore	0	4
(Austria) Peter Feigl	6	3	0
7	(Poland) Wojciech Fibak	4	6	6
4	(United States) Peter Fleming	4	5
(Italy) Gianni Ocleppo	6	7
(Czechoslovakia) Tomáš Šmíd	6	6	6
Q	(United States) Richard Meyer	7	2	4
Q	(France) Christophe Roger-Vasselin	3	6	2
(France) Jean-François Caujolle	6	1	6
(United States) Ferdi Taygan	6	6
(United Kingdom) Andrew Jarrett	1	4

Second Round
1	(United States) John McEnroe	6	6
(United Kingdom) Robin Drysdale	2	2
(United States) Marty Riessen	1	4
7	(Poland) Wojciech Fibak	6	6
(Italy) Gianni Ocleppo	6	7
(Czechoslovakia) Tomáš Šmíd	4	6
(France) Jean-François Caujolle	3	4
(United States) Ferdi Taygan	6	6

Quarterfinals
1	(United States) John McEnroe	6	6
7	(Poland) Wojciech Fibak	2	1
(Italy) Gianni Ocleppo	6	6
(United States) Ferdi Taygan	1	4

Semifinals
1	(United States) John McEnroe	6	6
(Italy) Gianni Ocleppo	3	0

=== Bottom half ===
First Round
(United States) Scott Carnahan	5	2
Q	(United States) Sherwood Stewart	7	6
(United States) Stan Smith	7	7
(United States) Nick Saviano	5	5
(United States) Vincent Van Patten	6	6
(United States) Tom Gullikson	2	4
(United Kingdom) Mark Cox	5	3
3	(United States) Harold Solomon	7	6
6	(United States) Tim Gullikson	6	5	6
Q	(Venezuela) Jorge Andrew	2	7	2
(United Kingdom) Richard Lewis	3	6	7
(Netherlands) Tom Okker	6	4	5
(South Africa) David Schneider	6	2	3
(United States) Hank Pfister	4	6	6
(United States) Bruce Manson	6	4
2	(Argentina) Guillermo Vilas	7	6

Second Round
Q	(United States) Sherwood Stewart	6	4	2
(United States) Stan Smith	2	6	6
(United States) Vincent Van Patten	6	2	2
3	(United States) Harold Solomon	3	6	6
6	(United States) Tim Gullikson	6	4	6
(United Kingdom) Richard Lewis	3	6	4
(United States) Hank Pfister	3	6	6
2	(Argentina) Guillermo Vilas	6	3	2

Quarterfinals
(United States) Stan Smith	4	4
3	(United States) Harold Solomon	6	6
6	(United States) Tim Gullikson	2	3
(United States) Hank Pfister	6	6

Semifinals
3	(United States) Harold Solomon	6	6
(United States) Hank Pfister	4	3
