= 1969 Wills Open British Covered Court Championships =

- Date: 17–22 November
- Edition: 2nd
- Draw: 32S / 16D
- Prize money: £20,000
- Surface: Carpet / indoor
- Location: London, England
- Venue: Queens Club; Wembley Arena

Champions

Men's singles
- (Australia) Rod Laver

Women's singles
- (United Kingdom) Ann Jones

Men's doubles
- (Australia) Roy Emerson / (Australia) Rod Laver

Women's doubles
- (United Kingdom) Ann Jones / (United Kingdom) Virginia Wade
← 1968 ·	Wembley Championships	· 1970 →

The 1969 Wills Open British Covered Court Championships was a combined men's and women's tennis tournament played on indoor carpet courts. It was the second edition of the British Indoor Championships in the Open era. The tournament took place at the Queens Club and Wembley Arena in London, England and ran from 17 November through 22 November 1969.

The men's singles event and the £3,000 first prize was won by first seeded Rod Laver while Ann Jones, also seeded first, won the women's singles title and the accompanying £1,300 first-prize money.

== Finals ==
=== Men's singles ===
(Australia) Rod Laver defeated (Australia) Tony Roche 6–4, 6–1, 6–3

=== Women's singles ===
(United Kingdom) Ann Jones defeated (United States) Billie Jean King 9–11, 6–2, 9–7

=== Men's doubles ===
(Australia) Roy Emerson / (Australia) Rod Laver defeated (United States) Pancho Gonzales / (South Africa) Bob Hewitt 5–7, 6–3, 6–4, 6–3

=== Women's doubles ===
(United Kingdom) Ann Jones / (United Kingdom) Virginia Wade defeated (United States) Rosie Casals / (United States) Billie Jean King 6–2, 6–4
