= 1979 Benson & Hedges Championships – Doubles =

Doubles
- 1979 Benson & Hedges Championships

Final
- Champion: (United States) John McEnroe (United States) Peter Fleming
- Runner-up: (Czechoslovakia) Tomáš Šmíd (United States) Stan Smith
- Score: 6–3, 6–2

Details
- Draw: 16
- Seeds: 4

Events
| Singles | Doubles |
- Wembley Championships

The 1979 Benson & Hedges Championships – Doubles was an event of the 1979 Benson & Hedges Championships tennis tournament and was played on iindoor carpet courts at the Wembley Arena in London in the United Kingdom, between 13 November and 17 November 1979. The draw comprised 16 teams and four of them were seeded. First-seeded Peter Fleming and John McEnroe were the defending Wembley Championships doubles champions and retained the title after a win in the final against fourth-seeded pairing Tomáš Šmíd and Stan Smith, 6–3, 6–2.

== Seeds ==
1. (United States) Peter Fleming / (United States) John McEnroe (Champions)
2. (United States) Marty Riessen / (United States) Sherwood Stewart (Semifinals)
3. (Poland) Wojciech Fibak / (Netherlands) Tom Okker (Semifinals)
4. (Czechoslovakia) Tomáš Šmíd / (United States) Stan Smith (Final)

== Draw ==
Key

- Q = Qualifier
- WC = Wild card
- LL = Lucky loser
- Alt = Alternate
- ITF = ITF entry
- PR = Protected ranking
- SR = Special ranking
- SE = Special exempt
- JE = Junior exempt
- JR = Junior Accelerator Programme entrant
- CO = College Accelerator Programme entrant
- NG = Next Gen Accelerator Program entrant
- w/o = Walkover
- r = Retired
- d = Defaulted

First Round
1 | (United States) Peter Fleming (United States) John McEnroe | 6 | 6
(Italy) Gianni Ocleppo (France) Christophe Roger-Vasselin | 4 | 2
(Australia) Steve Docherty (United States) Ferdi Taygan | 2 | 6 | 6
(Venezuela) Jorge Andrew (United States) Richard Meyer | 6 | 2 | 3
3 | (Poland) Wojciech Fibak (Netherlands) Tom Okker | 7 | 6 | 6
(United States) Tim Gullikson (United States) Tom Gullikson | 6 | 7 | 3
(United Kingdom) Robin Drysdale (United Kingdom) Richard Lewis | w/o
(United States) Brian Gottfried (South Africa) Frew McMillan
(United Kingdom) Mark Cox (United Kingdom) David Lloyd | 6 | 6 | 6
(United Kingdom) Chris Bradnam (United Kingdom) Andrew Jarrett | 4 | 7 | 2
(United Kingdom) John Lloyd (South Africa) Raymond Moore | 3 | 4
4 | (Czechoslovakia) Tomáš Šmíd (United States) Stan Smith | 6 | 6
(United States) Fritz Buehning (United States) Nick Saviano | 3 | 4
(United States) Bruce Manson (United States) Hank Pfister | 6 | 6
(Romania) Ion Țiriac (Argentina) Guillermo Vilas | 3 | 6 | 1
2 | (United States) Marty Riessen (United States) Sherwood Stewart | 6 | 4 | 6

Quarterfinals
1 | (United States) Peter Fleming (United States) John McEnroe | 6 | 6
(Australia) Steve Docherty (United States) Ferdi Taygan | 4 | 4
3 | (Poland) Wojciech Fibak (Netherlands) Tom Okker | 7 | 7
(United Kingdom) Robin Drysdale (United Kingdom) Richard Lewis | 5 | 6
(United Kingdom) Mark Cox (United Kingdom) David Lloyd | 0 | 3
4 | (Czechoslovakia) Tomáš Šmíd (United States) Stan Smith | 6 | 6
(United States) Bruce Manson (United States) Hank Pfister | 3 | 5
2 | (United States) Marty Riessen (United States) Sherwood Stewart | 6 | 7

Semifinals
1 | (United States) Peter Fleming (United States) John McEnroe | 6 | 7
3 | (Poland) Wojciech Fibak (Netherlands) Tom Okker | 3 | 6
4 | (Czechoslovakia) Tomáš Šmíd (United States) Stan Smith | 7 | 2 | 6
2 | (United States) Marty Riessen (United States) Sherwood Stewart | 6 | 6 | 4

Final
1 | (United States) Peter Fleming (United States) John McEnroe | 6 | 6
4 | (Czechoslovakia) Tomáš Šmíd (United States) Stan Smith | 2 | 3
