= 1982 Benson & Hedges Championships =

- Date: 8–14 November
- Edition: 7th
- Category: Grand Prix circuit
- Draw: 32S / 16D
- Prize money: $200,000
- Surface: Carpet / indoor
- Location: London, England
- Venue: Wembley Arena

Champions

Singles
- (United States) John McEnroe

Doubles
- (United States) John McEnroe / (United States) Peter Fleming
- Wembley Championships

The 1982 Benson & Hedges Championships, also known as the Wembley Championships, was a men's tennis tournament played on indoor carpet courts at the Wembley Arena in London, England that was part of the 1982 Volvo Grand Prix. It was the seventh edition of the tournament and was held from 8 November until 14 November 1982. First-seeded John McEnroe won the singles title.

== Finals ==
=== Singles ===
(United States) John McEnroe defeated (United States) Brian Gottfried 6–3, 6–2, 6–4

- It was McEnroe's 5th singles title of the year and the 39th of his career.

=== Doubles ===
(United States) John McEnroe / (United States) Peter Fleming defeated (Switzerland) Heinz Günthardt / (Czechoslovakia) Tomáš Šmíd 7–6, 6–4
