= 1984 Benson & Hedges Championships =

- Date: 5–11 November
- Edition: 9th
- Draw: 32S / 16D
- Prize money: $300,000
- Surface: Carpet (i)
- Location: London, England
- Venue: Wembley Arena
- Attendance: 51,190

Champions

Singles
- (Czechoslovakia) Ivan Lendl

Doubles
- (Czechoslovakia) Ivan Lendl / (Ecuador) Andrés Gómez
- Wembley Championships

The 1984 Benson & Hedges Championships was a men's tennis tournament played on indoor carpet courts at the Wembley Arena in London in England that was part of the 1984 Volvo Grand Prix. The tournament was held from 5 November through 11 November 1984. Third-seeded Ivan Lendl won the singles title and the accompanying $50,000 first-prize money.

== Finals ==
=== Singles ===
(Czechoslovakia) Ivan Lendl defeated (Ecuador) Andrés Gómez 7–6, 6–2, 6–1

- It was Lendl's 3rd singles title of the year and the 42nd of his career.

=== Doubles ===
(Czechoslovakia) Ivan Lendl / (Ecuador) Andrés Gómez defeated (Czechoslovakia) Pavel Složil / (Czechoslovakia) Tomáš Šmíd 6–2, 6–2
