= 1986 Benson & Hedges Championships =

- Date: 10–16 November
- Edition: 11th
- Draw: 32S / 16D
- Prize money: $300,000
- Surface: Carpet / indoor
- Location: London, England
- Venue: Wembley Arena

Champions

Singles
- (France) Yannick Noah

Doubles
- (United States) John McEnroe / (United States) Peter Fleming
- Wembley Championships

The 1986 Benson & Hedges Championships was a tennis tournament played on indoor carpet courts at the Wembley Arena in London, England that was part of the 1986 Nabisco Grand Prix. It was the 11th edition of the tournament and was held from 10 November until 16 November 1986. Third-seeded Yannick Noah, who entered on a wildcard, won the singles title.

== Finals ==
=== Singles ===
(France) Yannick Noah defeated (Sweden) Jonas Svensson 6–4, 6–3, 6–7, 4–6, 7–5

- It was Noah's 2nd singles title of the year and the 19th of his career.

=== Doubles ===
(United States) John McEnroe / (United States) Peter Fleming defeated (United States) Sherwood Stewart / (Australia) Kim Warwick 3–6, 7–6, 6–2
