= 1979 Benson & Hedges Championships =

- Date: 13–17 November
- Edition: 4th
- Draw: 32S / 16D
- Prize money: $175,000
- Surface: Carpet / indoors
- Location: London, England
- Venue: Wembley Arena
- Attendance: 63,000

Champions

Singles
- (United States) John McEnroe

Doubles
- (United States) John McEnroe / (United States) Peter Fleming
- Wembley Championships

The 1979 Benson & Hedges Championships, also known as the Wembley Championships, was a men's tennis tournament played on indoor carpet courts at the Wembley Arena in London, England that was part of the 1979 Colgate-Palmolive Grand Prix. It was the fourth edition of the tournament and was held from 13 November until 17 November 1979. First-seeded John McEnroe won his second consecutive title at the event.

== Finals ==
=== Singles ===
(United States) John McEnroe defeated (United States) Harold Solomon 6–3, 6–4, 7–5

- It was McEnroe's 10th singles title of the year and the 15th of his career.

=== Doubles ===
(United States) John McEnroe / (United States) Peter Fleming defeated (Czechoslovakia) Tomáš Šmíd / (United States) Stan Smith 6–3, 6–2
