= 1987 Benson & Hedges Championships =

- Date: 10–15 November
- Edition: 12th
- Draw: 32S / 16D
- Prize money: $375,000
- Surface: Carpet / indoor
- Location: London, England
- Venue: Wembley Arena

Champions

Singles
- (Czechoslovakia) Ivan Lendl

Doubles
- (Czechoslovakia) Miloslav Mečíř / (Czechoslovakia) Tomáš Šmíd
- Wembley Championships

The 1987 Benson & Hedges Championships was a men's tennis tournament played on indoor carpet courts at the Wembley Arena in London in England that was part of the 1987 Nabisco Grand Prix. It was the 12th edition of the tournament and was held from 10 November until 15 November 1987. First-seeded Ivan Lendl won the singles title, his third at the event after 1984 and 1985.

== Finals ==
=== Singles ===
(Czechoslovakia) Ivan Lendl defeated (Sweden) Anders Järryd 6–3, 6–2, 7–5

- It was Lendl's 7th singles title of the year and the 69th of his career.

=== Doubles ===
(Czechoslovakia) Miloslav Mečíř / (Czechoslovakia) Tomáš Šmíd defeated (United States) Ken Flach / (United States) Robert Seguso 7–5, 6–4
