= 1980 Benson & Hedges Championships =

- Date: 11–16 November
- Edition: 5th
- Category: Grand Prix circuit
- Draw: 32S / 16D
- Prize money: $175,000
- Surface: Carpet / indoor
- Location: London, England
- Venue: Wembley Arena

Champions

Singles
- (United States) John McEnroe

Doubles
- (United States) John McEnroe / (United States) Peter Fleming
- Wembley Championships

The 1980 Benson & Hedges Championships, also known as the Wembley Championships, was a men's tennis tournament played on indoor carpet courts at the Wembley Arena in London, England that was part of the 1980 Volvo Grand Prix. The tournament was held from 11 November through 16 November 1980. First-seeded John McEnroe won the singles title and the accompanying $30,000 first-prize money. It was his third successive singles title at the tournament.

== Finals ==
=== Singles ===
(United States) John McEnroe defeated (United States) Gene Mayer 6–4, 6–3, 6–3

- It was McEnroe's 8th singles title of the year and the 23rd of his career.

=== Doubles ===
(United States) John McEnroe / (United States) Peter Fleming defeated (United States) Bill Scanlon / (United States) Eliot Teltscher 7–5, 6–3
