= 1968 Jack Kramer Tournament of Champions =

1968 British Indoor Championships
- Date: 15–21 November
- Edition: 1st
- Draw: 16S / 8D
- Prize money: £20,000
- Surface: Carpet / indoor
- Location: London, England
- Venue: Wembley Pool Arena

Champions

Men's singles
- (Australia) Ken Rosewall

Men's doubles
- (Australia) John Newcombe / (Australia) Tony Roche
- Wembley Championships

The 1968 Jack Kramer Tournament of Champions was a men's professional tennis tournament played on indoor carpet courts. It was the first edition of the British Indoor Championships in the Open era. The tournament took place at the Wembley Pool Arena in London, England and ran from 15 November through 21 November 1968.

The singles event and the accompanying £5,000 first prize was won by Ken Rosewall.

== Finals ==
=== Singles ===
(Australia) Ken Rosewall defeated (Australia) John Newcombe 6–4, 4–6, 7–5, 6–4

=== Doubles ===
(Australia) John Newcombe / (Australia) Tony Roche defeated (United States) Pancho Gonzales / (Spain) Andrés Gimeno 6–3, 9–7

== Draws ==
=== Singles ===
First round
(Australia) Rod Laver	3	7
(Australia) Roy Emerson	6	9
(Australia) Fred Stolle	10	6
(United States) Butch Buchholz	8	3
(Australia) John Newcombe	10	7
(United States) Marty Riessen	8	5
(United States) Dennis Ralston	3	6	6
(United Kingdom) Roger Taylor	6	3	4
(Spain) Andrés Gimeno	3	6	6
(France) Pierre Barthès	6	1	4
(Australia) Tony Roche	8	6
(South Africa) Ray Moore	6	0
(United States) Pancho Gonzales	8	9	3
(Socialist Federal Republic of Yugoslavia) Niki Pilić	6	11	6
(South Africa) Cliff Drysdale	4	5
(Australia) Ken Rosewall	6	7

Quarterfinals
(Australia) Roy Emerson	3	r.
(Australia) Fred Stolle	2
(Australia) John Newcombe	7	9
(United States) Dennis Ralston	5	7
(Spain) Andrés Gimeno	6	16
(Australia) Tony Roche	4	14
(Socialist Federal Republic of Yugoslavia) Niki Pilić	1	3
(Australia) Ken Rosewall	6	6

Semifinals
(Australia) Fred Stolle	6	2	4
(Australia) John Newcombe	3	6	6
(Spain) Andrés Gimeno	5	1
(Australia) Ken Rosewall	7	6

Final
(Australia) John Newcombe	4	6	5	4
(Australia) Ken Rosewall	6	4	7	6
