= 1981 Benson & Hedges Championships =

- Date: 9–14 November
- Edition: 6th
- Category: Grand Prix circuit
- Draw: 32S / 16D
- Prize money: $175,000
- Surface: Carpet / indoor
- Location: London, England
- Venue: Wembley Arena

Champions

Singles
- (United States) Jimmy Connors

Doubles
- (United States) John McEnroe / (United States) Peter Fleming
- Wembley Championships

The 1981 Benson & Hedges Championships was a men's tennis tournament played on indoor carpet courts at the Wembley Arena in London, England that was part of the 1981 Volvo Grand Prix. It was the sixth edition of the tournament and was held from 9 November until 14 November 1981. Second-seeded Jimmy Connors won the singles title.

== Finals ==
=== Singles ===
(United States) Jimmy Connors defeated (United States) John McEnroe 3–6, 2–6, 6–3, 6–4, 6–2

- It was Connors' 4th singles title of the year and the 89th of his career.

=== Doubles ===
(United States) Ferdi Taygan / (United States) Sherwood Stewart defeated (United States) John McEnroe / (United States) Peter Fleming 7–5, 6–7, 6–4

== See also ==
- Connors–McEnroe rivalry
