= 1971 Embassy British Indoor Championships =

1971 British Indoor Championships
- Date: 23–30 October
- Edition: 4th
- Category: Grand Prix (B Class)
- Draw: 32S / 16D
- Prize money: $50,000
- Surface: Carpet / indoor
- Location: London, England
- Venue: Wembley Arena

Champions

Men's singles
- (Romania) Ilie Năstase

Women's singles
- (United States) Billie Jean King

Men's doubles
- (South Africa) Bob Hewitt / (South Africa) Frew McMillan

Women's doubles
- (France) Françoise Dürr / (United Kingdom) Virginia Wade
- Wembley Championships

The 1971 Embassy British Indoor Championships was a combined men's and women's Grand Prix tennis tournament played on indoor carpet courts. The event was categorized as a B Class tournament and was the 4th edition of the British Indoor Championships in the Open era. The tournament took place at the Wembley Arena in London in England and ran from 23 October through 30 October 1971.

The men's singles event was won by unseeded Ilie Năstase who received 30 Grand Prix ranking points for his tournament victory. Billie Jean King won the women's singles title.

== Finals ==
=== Men's singles ===
(Romania) Ilie Năstase defeated (Australia) Rod Laver 3–6, 6–3, 3–6, 6–4, 6–4

- It was Năstase's 6th title of the year and the 7th of his open era career.

=== Women's singles ===
(United States) Billie Jean King defeated (France) Françoise Dürr 6–1, 5–7, 7–5

=== Men's doubles ===
(South Africa) Bob Hewitt / (South Africa) Frew McMillan defeated (Australia) Bill Bowrey / (Australia) Owen Davidson 7–5, 9–7, 6–2

=== Women's doubles ===
(France) Françoise Dürr / (United Kingdom) Virginia Wade defeated (Australia) Evonne Goolagong / (United States) Julie Heldman 3–6, 7–5, 6–3
