= Jakob Hlasek =

Swiss tennis player (born 1964)

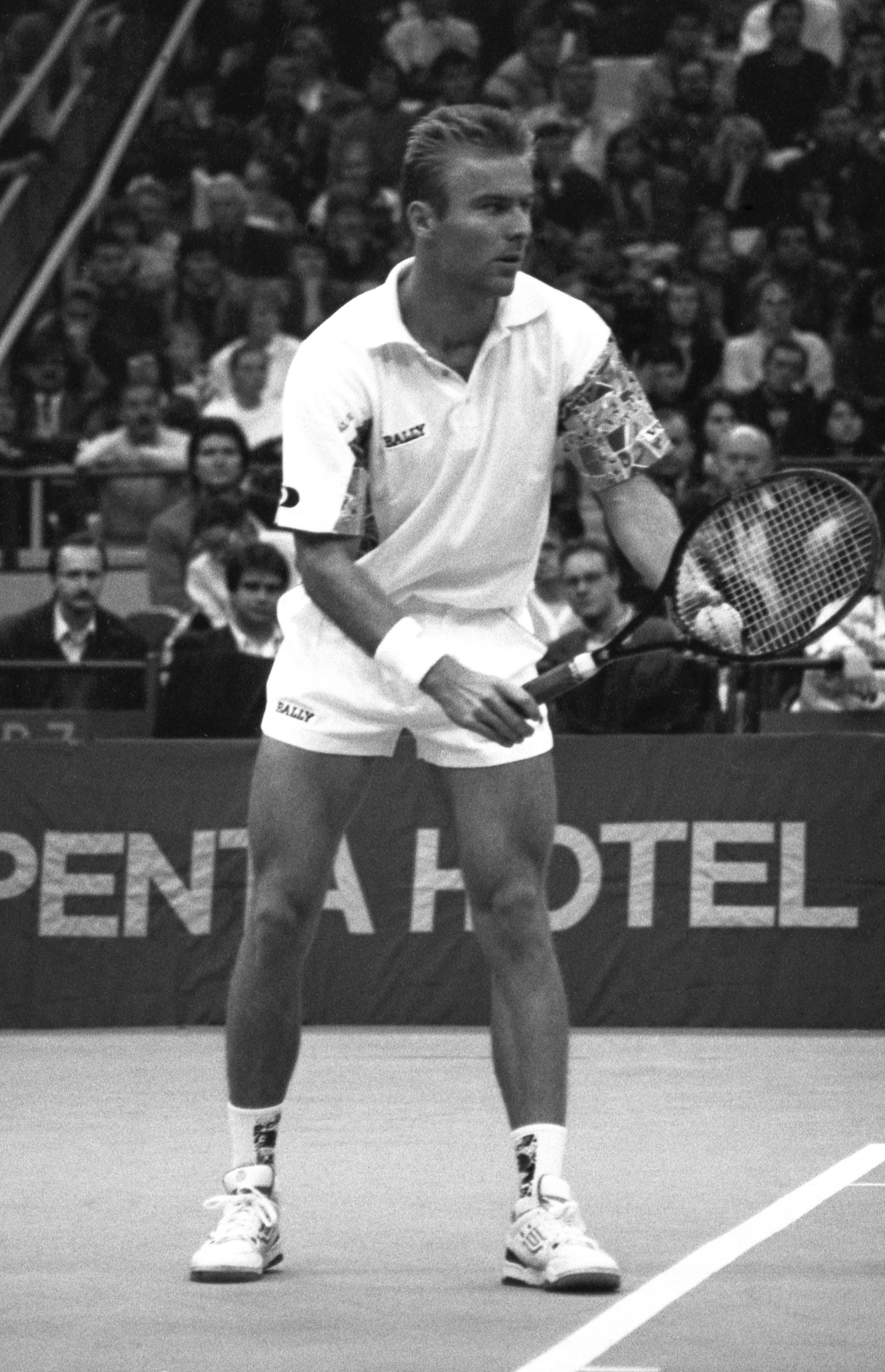
- Country (sports): Switzerland
- Residence: Montreux, Switzerland
- Born: 12 November 1964 (age 61) Prague, Czechoslovakia
- Height: 1.87 m (6 ft 1 1/2 in)
- Turned pro: 1983
- Retired: 1996
- Plays: Right-handed (one-handed backhand)
- Prize money: US$ 5,895,293

Singles
- Career record: 432–329
- Career titles: 5
- Highest ranking: No. 7 (17 April 1989)

Grand Slam singles results
- Australian Open: 3R (1984, 1985)
- French Open: QF (1991)
- Wimbledon: 4R (1987, 1996)
- US Open: 4R (1988, 1996)

Other tournaments
- Tour Finals: SF (1988)
- Grand Slam Cup: QF (1991, 1996)
- WCT Finals: QF (1989)
- Olympic Games: QF (1984, demonstration)

Doubles
- Career record: 367–272
- Career titles: 20
- Highest ranking: No. 4 (13 November 1989)

Grand Slam doubles results
- Australian Open: SF (1996)
- French Open: W (1992)
- Wimbledon: SF (1986, 1992)
- US Open: SF (1996)

Team competitions
- Davis Cup: F (1992)
- Hopman Cup: W (1992)

Jakob Hlasek (Czech: Jakub Hlásek; born 12 November 1964) is a Swiss former professional tennis player of Czech origin. He won a major doubles title at the 1992 French Open, partnering Marc Rosset.

== Career ==
The major highlights of Hlasek's career came in 1992. He won the French Open men's doubles title that year (partnering fellow Swiss player Marc Rosset). He was also a member of Switzerland Davis Cup team which reached the final of the 1992 Davis Cup (where they were defeated by the United States), and won the 1992 Hopman Cup (partnering Manuela Maleeva-Fragnière). His best Grand Slam performance was reaching the quarter-finals of the 1991 French Open, defeating David Pate, Emilio Sánchez, Tomás Carbonell and Christian Miniussi before losing to Andre Agassi.

Further success for his country came in 1996, when Hlasek was a member of the Swiss team which won the World Team Cup.

During his career, Hlasek won five top-level singles titles and 20 doubles titles. His career-high singles ranking was world no. 7, and his career-high doubles ranking was world no. 4 (both attained in 1989). His career prize-money earnings totalled $5,895,293.

== Career finals ==
=== Singles: 14 (5 wins – 9 losses) ===
Result	W/L	Date	Tournament	Surface	Opponent	Score
Loss	0–1	Mar 1985	Rotterdam, Netherlands	Carpet	(Czechoslovakia) Miloslav Mečíř	1–6, 2–6
Loss	0–2	Aug 1986	Hilversum, Netherlands	Clay	(Austria) Thomas Muster	1–6, 3–6, 3–6
Loss	0–3	Jul 1988	Gstaad, Switzerland	Clay	(Australia) Darren Cahill	3–6, 4–6, 6–7^{(2–7)}
Loss	0–4	Oct 1988	Basel, Switzerland	Hard (i)	(Sweden) Stefan Edberg	5–7, 3–6, 6–3, 2–6
Win	1–4	Nov 1988	Wembley, England	Carpet	(Sweden) Jonas Svensson	6–7^{(4–7)}, 3–6, 6–4, 6–0, 7–5
Win	2–4	Nov 1988	Johannesburg, South Africa	Hard (i)	(South Africa) Christo van Rensburg	6–7^{(1–7)}, 6–4, 6–1, 7–6^{(7–4)}
Loss	2–5	Nov 1988	Brussels, Belgium	Carpet	(France) Henri Leconte	6–7^{(3–7)}, 6–7^{(6–8)}, 4–6
Win	3–5	Feb 1989	Rotterdam, Netherlands	Carpet	(Sweden) Anders Järryd	6–1, 7–5
Loss	3–6	Feb 1989	Lyon, France	Carpet	(United States) John McEnroe	3–6, 6–7^{(3–7)}
Win	4–6	Nov 1990	Wembley, England	Carpet	(United States) Michael Chang	7–6^{(9–7)}, 6–3
Win	5–6	Sep 1991	Basel, Switzerland	Hard (i)	(United States) John McEnroe	7–6^{(7–4)}, 6–0, 6–3
Loss	5–7	Nov 1991	Moscow, Soviet Union	Carpet	(Soviet Union) Andrei Cherkasov	6–7^{(2–7)}, 6–3, 6–7^{(5–7)}
Loss	5–8	Jul 1995	Gstaad, Switzerland	Clay	(Russia) Yevgeny Kafelnikov	3–6, 4–6, 6–3, 3–6
Loss	5–9	Sep 1995	Bordeaux, France	Hard	(Senegal) Yahiya Doumbia	4–6, 4–6

=== Doubles: 35 (20 wins – 15 losses) ===
Legend Grand Slam (1) Tennis Masters Cup (1) ATP Masters Series (2) ATP Championship Series (2) ATP Tour (14)	Titles by surface Hard (7) Clay (3) Grass (1) Carpet (9)

Result	W/L	Date	Tournament	Surface	Partnering	Opponent	Score
Loss	0–1	Sep 1984	Tel Aviv, Israel	Hard	(United Kingdom) Colin Dowdeswell	(Australia) Peter Doohan (South Africa) Brian Levine	3–6, 4–6
Win	1–1	Oct 1985	Toulouse, France	Hard (i)	(Chile) Ricardo Acuña	(Czechoslovakia) Pavel Složil (Czechoslovakia) Tomáš Šmíd	3–6, 6–2, 9–7
Loss	1–2	Nov 1985	Hong Kong	Hard	(Czechoslovakia) Tomáš Šmíd	(Australia) Brad Drewett (Australia) Kim Warwick	3–6, 6–4, 2–6
Win	2–2	Apr 1986	Nice, France	Clay	(Czechoslovakia) Pavel Složil	(United States) Gary Donnelly (United Kingdom) Colin Dowdeswell	6–3, 4–6, 11–9
Loss	2–3	Oct 1986	Toulouse, France	Hard (i)	(Czechoslovakia) Pavel Složil	(Czechoslovakia) Miloslav Mečíř (Czechoslovakia) Tomáš Šmíd	2–6, 6–3, 4–6
Win	3–3	Nov 1987	Paris, France	Carpet	(Switzerland) Claudio Mezzadri	(United States) Scott Davis (United States) David Pate	7–6, 6–2
Win	4–3	Oct 1988	Basel, Switzerland	Hard (i)	(Czechoslovakia) Tomáš Šmíd	(United Kingdom) Jeremy Bates (Sweden) Peter Lundgren	6–3, 6–1
Win	5–3	Feb 1989	Milan, Italy	Carpet	(United States) John McEnroe	(Switzerland) Heinz Günthardt (Hungary) Balázs Taróczy	6–3, 6–4
Loss	5–4	Feb 1989	Lyon, France	Carpet	(United States) John McEnroe	(West Germany) Eric Jelen (Denmark) Michael Mortensen	2–6, 6–3, 3–6
Win	6–4	Mar 1989	Indian Wells, US	Hard	(West Germany) Boris Becker	(United States) Kevin Curren (United States) David Pate	7–6, 7–5
Win	7–4	Apr 1989	Miami, US	Hard	(Sweden) Anders Järryd	(United States) Jim Grabb (United States) Patrick McEnroe	6–3, ret.
Loss	7–5	Nov 1989	Paris, France	Carpet	(France) Eric Winogradsky	(Australia) John Fitzgerald (Sweden) Anders Järryd	6–7, 4–6
Win	8–5	Nov 1989	Wembley, England	Carpet	(United States) John McEnroe	(United Kingdom) Jeremy Bates (United States) Kevin Curren	6–1, 7–6
Win	9–5	Feb 1990	Stuttgart Indoor, West Germany	Carpet	(France) Guy Forget	(Denmark) Michael Mortensen (Netherlands) Tom Nijssen	6–3, 6–2
Win	10–5	Jun 1990	Rosmalen, Netherlands	Grass	(West Germany) Michael Stich	(United States) Jim Grabb (United States) Patrick McEnroe	7–6, 6–3
Win	11–5	Aug 1990	Long Island, US	Hard	(France) Guy Forget	(West Germany) Udo Riglewski (West Germany) Michael Stich	2–6, 6–3, 6–4
Win	12–5	Oct 1990	Tokyo Indoor, Japan	Carpet	(France) Guy Forget	(United States) Scott Davis (United States) David Pate	7–6, 7–5
Win	13–5	Oct 1990	Stockholm, Sweden	Carpet	(France) Guy Forget	(Australia) John Fitzgerald (Sweden) Anders Järryd	6–4, 6–2
Win	14–5	Nov 1990	Doubles Championships, Australia	Hard	(France) Guy Forget	(Spain) Emilio Sánchez (Spain) Sergio Casal	6–4, 7–6, 5–7, 6–4
Loss	14–6	Jul 1991	Gstaad, Switzerland	Clay	(France) Guy Forget	(South Africa) Gary Muller (South Africa) Danie Visser	6–7, 4–6
Win	15–6	Sep 1991	Basel, Switzerland	Hard (i)	(United States) Patrick McEnroe	(Czechoslovakia) Petr Korda (United States) John McEnroe	3–6, 7–6, 7–6
Loss	15–7	Oct 1991	Vienna, Austria	Carpet	(United States) Patrick McEnroe	(Sweden) Anders Järryd (South Africa) Gary Muller	4–6, 5–7
Loss	15–8	Feb 1992	Brussels, Belgium	Carpet	(France) Guy Forget	(Germany) Boris Becker (United States) John McEnroe	3–6, 2–6
Win	16–8	May 1992	Rome, Italy	Clay	(Switzerland) Marc Rosset	(South Africa) Wayne Ferreira (Australia) Mark Kratzmann	6–4, 3–6, 6–1
Win	17–8	Jun 1992	French Open, Paris	Clay	(Switzerland) Marc Rosset	(South Africa) David Adams (Russia) Andrei Olhovskiy	7–6, 6–7, 7–5
Win	18–8	Oct 1992	Lyon, France	Carpet	(Switzerland) Marc Rosset	(United Kingdom) Neil Broad (South Africa) Stefan Kruger	6–1, 6–3
Loss	18–9	May 1994	Madrid, Spain	Clay	(France) Jean-Philippe Fleurian	(Sweden) Rikard Bergh (Netherlands) Menno Oosting	3–6, 4–6
Loss	18–10	Jul 1994	Washington, US	Hard	(Sweden) Jonas Björkman	(Canada) Grant Connell (United States) Patrick Galbraith	4–6, 6–4, 3–6
Win	19–10	Oct 1994	Lyon, France	Carpet	(Russia) Yevgeny Kafelnikov	(Czech Republic) Martin Damm (Australia) Patrick Rafter	6–7, 7–6, 7–6
Loss	19–11	Mar 1995	St. Petersburg, Russia	Carpet	(Russia) Yevgeny Kafelnikov	(Czech Republic) Martin Damm (Sweden) Anders Järryd	4–6, 2–6
Loss	19–12	Oct 1995	Tokyo Indoor, Japan	Carpet	(United States) Patrick McEnroe	(Netherlands) Jacco Eltingh (Netherlands) Paul Haarhuis	6–7, 4–6
Win	20–12	Oct 1995	Lyon, France	Carpet	(Russia) Yevgeny Kafelnikov	(South Africa) John-Laffnie de Jager (South Africa) Wayne Ferreira	6–3, 6–3
Loss	20–13	Mar 1996	Milan, Italy	Carpet	(France) Guy Forget	(Italy) Andrea Gaudenzi (Croatia) Goran Ivanišević	4–6, 5–7
Loss	20–14	May 1996	Hamburg, Germany	Clay	(France) Guy Forget	(The Bahamas) Mark Knowles (Canada) Daniel Nestor	2–6, 4–6
Loss	20–15	Jun 1996	French Open, Paris	Clay	(France) Guy Forget	(Russia) Yevgeny Kafelnikov (Czech Republic) Daniel Vacek	2–6, 3–6

== Performance timelines ==
Key
W	F	SF	QF	#R	RR	Q#	DNQ	A	NH

(W) winner; (F) finalist; (SF) semifinalist; (QF) quarterfinalist; (#R) rounds 4, 3, 2, 1; (RR) round-robin stage; (Q#) qualification round; (DNQ) did not qualify; (A) absent; (NH) not held; (SR) strike rate (events won / competed); (W–L) win–loss record.

=== Singles ===
Tournament	1983	1984	1985	1986	1987	1988	1989	1990	1991	1992	1993	1994	1995	1996	SR	W–L
Grand Slam tournaments
Australian Open	A	3R	3R	NH	2R	1R	1R	1R	1R	1R	A	2R	1R	2R	0 / 11	5–11
French Open	A	2R	2R	2R	1R	3R	4R	2R	QF	1R	2R	1R	1R	3R	0 / 13	16–13
Wimbledon	3R	2R	1R	3R	4R	2R	1R	2R	2R	3R	3R	3R	1R	4R	0 / 14	20–14
US Open	A	1R	1R	1R	3R	4R	A	3R	3R	2R	2R	A	2R	4R	0 / 11	15–11
Win–loss	2–1	3–4	3–4	3–3	5–4	6–4	3–3	4–4	7–4	3–4	4–3	3–3	1–4	9–4	0 / 49	56–49
ATP Masters Series
Indian Wells	Tournaments Were Not Masters Series Events Before 1990							A	A	QF	2R	A	A	2R	0 / 3	5–3
Miami	Tournaments Were Not Masters Series Events Before 1990							QF	3R	SF	3R	A	A	3R	0 / 5	11–5
Monte Carlo	Tournaments Were Not Masters Series Events Before 1990							1R	A	1R	1R	A	A	A	0 / 3	0–3
Rome	Tournaments Were Not Masters Series Events Before 1990							1R	2R	2R	1R	A	A	1R	0 / 5	2–5
Hamburg	Tournaments Were Not Masters Series Events Before 1990							2R	A	A	A	A	A	1R	0 / 2	1–2
Canada	Tournaments Were Not Masters Series Events Before 1990							SF	QF	A	3R	2R	1R	1R	0 / 6	9–6
Cincinnati	Tournaments Were Not Masters Series Events Before 1990							QF	2R	1R	2R	A	A	2R	0 / 5	6–5
Stockholm	Tournaments Were Not Masters Series Events Before 1990							2R	3R	2R	2R	A	A	A	0 / 4	4–4
Paris	Tournaments Were Not Masters Series Events Before 1990							QF	2R	SF	1R	2R	QF	A	0 / 6	10–6
Win–loss	Tournaments Were Not Masters Series Events Before 1990							16–8	6–6	12–7	6–8	2–2	3–2	3–6	0 / 39	48–39
Ranking	179	91	33	32	23	8	30	17	20	36	71	70	35	74		

=== Doubles ===
Tournament	1983	1984	1985	1986	1987	1988	1989	1990	1991	1992	1993	1994	1995	1996	SR	W–L
Grand Slam tournaments
Australian Open	A	1R	A	NH	3R	1R	2R	3R	1R	2R	A	2R	QF	SF	0 / 10	12–10
French Open	A	1R	2R	2R	1R	1R	3R	1R	3R	W	1R	2R	SF	F	1 / 13	22–12
Wimbledon	2R	2R	1R	SF	2R	A	3R	3R	A	SF	1R	1R	QF	QF	0 / 12	21–12
US Open	A	A	1R	1R	1R	3R	A	QF	1R	2R	1R	A	2R	SF	0 / 10	11–10
Win–loss	1–1	1–3	1–3	5–3	2–4	2–3	5–3	6–4	2–3	12–3	0–3	2–3	11–4	16–4	1 / 45	66–44
ATP Masters Series
Indian Wells	Tournaments Were Not Masters Series Events Before 1990							A	A	1R	2R	A	A	2R	0 / 3	1–3
Miami	Tournaments Were Not Masters Series Events Before 1990							SF	2R	3R	A	A	A	2R	0 / 4	5–4
Monte Carlo	Tournaments Were Not Masters Series Events Before 1990							QF	A	QF	2R	A	A	A	0 / 3	3–3
Rome	Tournaments Were Not Masters Series Events Before 1990							1R	SF	W	1R	A	A	1R	1 / 5	8–4
Hamburg	Tournaments Were Not Masters Series Events Before 1990							QF	A	A	A	A	A	F	0 / 2	4–2
Canada	Tournaments Were Not Masters Series Events Before 1990							1R	QF	A	1R	2R	QF	1R	0 / 6	5–6
Cincinnati	Tournaments Were Not Masters Series Events Before 1990							SF	1R	SF	1R	A	A	1R	0 / 5	6–5
Stuttgart (Stockholm)	Tournaments Were Not Masters Series Events Before 1990							W	QF	A	A	A	A	2R	1 / 3	6–2
Paris	Tournaments Were Not Masters Series Events Before 1990							QF	2R	2R	2R	A	QF	2R	0 / 6	3–6
Win–loss	Tournaments Were Not Masters Series Events Before 1990							13–7	7–6	12–5	1–6	1–1	3–2	4–8	2 / 37	41–35
Ranking	180	107	47	39	35	47	5	12	39	8	180	49	24	9		
