= Wembley Championships =

Tennis tournament

Defunct tennis tournament
- Founded: 1934
- Abolished: 1990
- Editions: 40
- Location: London, England
- Venue: Empire Pool
- Surface: Wood (1934–1967); Carpet (1968–1990)

The Wembley Championships was a men's professional tennis tournament held from 1934–1990 with some periods of inactivity in between and is often considered to be one of the three major professional tennis tournaments from 1927–1967 until the advent of the open era. Ken Rosewall's and Rod Laver's six singles titles are the record for this event. The tournament only had a men's draw.

It was first held in 1934 at the Empire Pool at Wembley Park, Wembley, north-west London. In 1968, it was titled the Jack Kramer Tournament of Champions. In 1970 it was the penultimate event on the Grand Prix Tennis Tour.

== Name ==
It was officially called the Wembley Professional Championships, although it was later named the London Indoor Professional Championships. In 1968 it was titled the Jack Kramer Tournament of Champions.

== Past finals ==
Year	Champions	Runners-up	Score	Surface
Professional Era
1934	(United States) Ellsworth Vines	(Germany) Hans Nüsslein	4–6, 7–5, 6–3, 8–6^{r1}	Wood (i)
1935	(United States) Ellsworth Vines	(United States) Bill Tilden	6–1, 6–3, 5–7, 3–6, 6–3	Wood (i)
1936	Not held ^{a}			
1937	(Germany) Hans Nüsslein	(United States) Bill Tilden	6–3, 3–6, 6–3, 2–6, 6–2	Wood (i)
1938	Not held ^{b}			
1939	(United States) Don Budge	(Germany) Hans Nüsslein	13–11, 2–6, 6–4^{r2}	Wood (i)
1940–1948	Not held			
1949	(United States) Jack Kramer	(United States) Bobby Riggs	2–6, 6–4, 6–3, 6–4	Wood (i)
1950	(United States) Pancho Gonzales	(United States) Welby Van Horn	6–3, 6–3, 6–2	Wood (i)
1951	(United States) Pancho Gonzales	(Ecuador) Pancho Segura	6–2, 6–2, 2–6, 6–4	Wood (i)
1952	(United States) Pancho Gonzales	(United States) Jack Kramer	3–6, 3–6, 6–2, 6–4, 7–5	Wood (i)
1953	(Australia) Frank Sedgman	(United States) Pancho Gonzales	6–1, 6–2, 6–2	Wood (i)
1954–1955	Not held			
1956	(United States) Pancho Gonzales	(Australia) Frank Sedgman	4–6, 11–9, 11–9, 9–7	Wood (i)
1957	(Australia) Ken Rosewall	(Ecuador) Pancho Segura	1–6, 6–3, 6–4, 3–6, 6–4	Wood (i)
1958	(Australia) Frank Sedgman	(United States) Tony Trabert	6–4, 6–3, 6–4	Wood (i)
1959	(Australia) Mal Anderson	(Ecuador) Pancho Segura	4–6, 6–4, 3–6, 6–3, 8–6	Wood (i)
1960	(Australia) Ken Rosewall	(Ecuador) Pancho Segura	5–7, 8–6, 6–1, 6–3	Wood (i)
1961	(Australia) Ken Rosewall	(Australia) Lew Hoad	6–3, 3–6, 6–2, 6–3	Wood (i)
1962	(Australia) Ken Rosewall	(Australia) Lew Hoad	6–4, 5–7, 15–13, 7–5	Wood (i)
1963	(Australia) Ken Rosewall	(Australia) Lew Hoad	6–4, 6–2, 4–6, 6–3	Wood (i)
1964	(Australia) Rod Laver	(Australia) Ken Rosewall	7–5, 4–6, 5–7, 8–6, 8–6	Wood (i)
1965	(Australia) Rod Laver	(Spain) Andrés Gimeno	6–2, 6–3, 6–4	Wood (i)
1966	(Australia) Rod Laver	(Australia) Ken Rosewall	6–2, 6–2, 6–3	Wood (i)
1967	(Australia) Rod Laver	(Australia) Ken Rosewall	2–6, 6–1, 1–6, 8–6, 6–2	Wood (i)
Open Era
1968	(Australia) Ken Rosewall	(Australia) John Newcombe	6–4, 4–6, 7–5, 6–4	Carpet (i)
1969	(Australia) Rod Laver	(Australia) Tony Roche	6–4, 6–1, 6–3	Carpet (i)
1970	(Australia) Rod Laver	(United States) Cliff Richey	6–3, 6–4, 7–5	Carpet (i)
1971	(Romania) Ilie Năstase	(Australia) Rod Laver	3–6, 6–3, 3–6, 6–4, 6–4	Carpet (i)
1972–1975	Not held			
1976	(United States) Jimmy Connors	(United States) Roscoe Tanner	3–6, 7–6, 6–4	Carpet (i)
1977	(Sweden) Björn Borg	(United Kingdom) John Lloyd	6–4, 6–4, 6–3	Carpet (i)
1978	(United States) John McEnroe	(United States) Tim Gullikson	6–7, 6–4, 7–6, 6–2	Carpet (i)
1979	(United States) John McEnroe	(United States) Harold Solomon	6–3, 6–4, 7–5	Carpet (i)
1980	(United States) John McEnroe	(United States) Gene Mayer	6–4, 6–3, 6–3	Carpet (i)
1981	(United States) Jimmy Connors	(United States) John McEnroe	3–6, 2–6, 6–3, 6–4, 6–2	Carpet (i)
1982	(United States) John McEnroe	(United States) Brian Gottfried	6–3, 6–2, 6–4	Carpet (i)
1983	(United States) John McEnroe	(United States) Jimmy Connors	7–5, 6–1, 6–4	Carpet (i)
1984	(Czechoslovakia) Ivan Lendl	(Ecuador) Andrés Gómez	7–6, 6–2, 6–1	Carpet (i)
1985	(Czechoslovakia) Ivan Lendl	(West Germany) Boris Becker	6–7, 6–3, 4–6, 6–4, 6–4	Carpet (i)
1986	(France) Yannick Noah	(Sweden) Jonas Svensson	6–2, 6–3, 6–7, 4–6, 7–5	Carpet (i)
1987	(Czechoslovakia) Ivan Lendl	(Sweden) Anders Järryd	6–3, 6–2, 7–5	Carpet (i)
1988	(Switzerland) Jakob Hlasek	(Sweden) Jonas Svensson	6–7, 3–6, 6–4, 6–0, 7–5	Carpet (i)
1989	(United States) Michael Chang	(France) Guy Forget	6–2, 6–1, 6–1	Carpet (i)
1990	(Switzerland) Jakob Hlasek	(United States) Michael Chang	7–6, 6–3	Carpet (i)

Notes:

^{a}1936 tournament was cancelled due to Tilden and Vines playing in Japan. This was reported in London Daily Mail on 24 August 1936. There are sources that say Ellsworth Vines defeated Hans Nüsslein 6–4, 6–4, 6–2, but this must have been a different event.

^{b}No reports of a 1938 tournament in British newspapers (the Wembley event was always reported in major British newspapers). Ray Bowers in an article on The Tennis Server website states there was no event held. There are sources that tell us Hans Nüsslein defeated Bill Tilden 7–5, 3–6, 6–3, 3–6, 6–2, but this must have been held elsewhere.

^{r1} For 1934, the tournament was played under Round Robin format with Vines 5-0 and Nüsslein 4-1 as final standings.

^{r1} For 1939, the tournament was played under Round Robin format with Budge 3-0 and Nüsslein, Tilden and Vines as 1-2 as final standings.

=== Doubles ===
Year	Champions	Runners-up	Score	Surface
Professional Era
1934				Wood (i)
1935	(United States) Bill Tilden (United States) Ellsworth Vines	(United States) George Lott (United States) Lester Stoefen	6–4, 6–4, 7–5	Wood (i)
1936	Not held			
1937	(Germany) Hans Nüsslein (France) Martin Plaa	(United States) Lester Stoefen (United States) Bill Tilden		Wood (i)
1938	Not held			
1939				Wood (i)
1938–1948	Not held			
1949	(United States) Jack Kramer (United States) Bobby Riggs	(Australia) Dinny Pails (Ecuador) Pancho Segura	3–6, 4–6, 6–3, 6–4, 6–1	Wood (i)
1950	(United States) Don Budge (United States) Pancho Gonzales	(United States) Bobby Riggs (United States) Welby Van Horn	8–6, 9–7, 4–6, 6–4	Wood (i)
1951	(United States) Pancho Gonzales (Ecuador) Pancho Segura	(United States) Bobby Riggs (United States) Welby Van Horn	6–4, 6–4, 3–6, 6–3	Wood (i)
1952	(United States) Pancho Gonzales (Ecuador) Pancho Segura	(United States) Don Budge (United States) Jack Kramer	6–3, 6–1	Wood (i)
1953	(United States) Don Budge (Australia) Frank Sedgman	(United States) Pancho Gonzales (Ecuador) Pancho Segura	6–3, 6–3, 6–2	Wood (i)
1954–1955	Not held			
1956	(United States) Pancho Gonzales (United States) Tony Trabert	(Australia) Rex Hartwig (Australia) Frank Sedgman	6–3, 6–4, 6–4	Wood (i)
1957	(Australia) Lew Hoad (Australia) Ken Rosewall	(United States) Jack Kramer (Ecuador) Pancho Segura	3–6, 6–8, 6–2, 6–1, 6–2	Wood (i)
1958	(United States) Pancho Gonzales (Australia) Ken Rosewall	(United States) Jack Kramer (Ecuador) Pancho Segura	6–3, 6–2, 6–3	Wood (i)
1959	(Australia) Lew Hoad (United States) Tony Trabert	(Australia) Ken Rosewall (Ecuador) Pancho Segura	11–9, 9–7, 6–2	Wood (i)
1960	(Australia) Ken Rosewall (Australia) Frank Sedgman	(Australia) Lew Hoad (United States) Tony Trabert	4–6, 6–3, 7–9, 6–4, 6–2	Wood (i)
1961	(Australia) Lew Hoad (Australia) Ken Rosewall	(Peru) Alex Olmedo (Ecuador) Pancho Segura	3–6, 6–4, 6–3, 8–6	Wood (i)
1962	(Australia) Lew Hoad (Australia) Ken Rosewall	(Peru) Alex Olmedo (Ecuador) Pancho Segura	6–2, 6–3, 6–3	Wood (i)
1963	(Peru) Alex Olmedo (Australia) Frank Sedgman	(United States) Butch Buchholz (United States) Barry MacKay	3–6, 6–3, 6–2, 10–8	Wood (i)
1964	(Australia) Lew Hoad (Australia) Ken Rosewall	(United States) Butch Buchholz (Australia) Rod Laver	1–6, 7–5, 6–3, 6–1	Wood (i)
1965	(United States) Butch Buchholz (Australia) Rod Laver	(Australia) Frank Sedgman (Ecuador) Pancho Segura	6–3, 6–3, 6–2	Wood (i)
1966	(Australia) Lew Hoad (Australia) Ken Rosewall	(United States) Butch Buchholz (Australia) Rod Laver	6–4, 8–6, 3–6, 6–2	Wood (i)
1967	(Australia) Rod Laver (Australia) Fred Stolle	(United States) Butch Buchholz (Australia) Lew Hoad	7–5, 6–3, 6–4	Wood (i)
Open Era
1968	(Australia) John Newcombe (Australia) Tony Roche	(Spain) Andrés Gimeno (United States) Pancho Gonzales	6–3, 9–7	Carpet (i)

== See also ==
- Wembley Professional Championships draws - Professional Era (1934–1967)
- U.S. Pro Tennis Championships
- French Pro Championship
- Major professional tennis tournaments before the Open Era

== Bibliography ==
- McCauley, Joe (2000). The History of Professional Tennis. Windsor: The Short Run Book Company Limited.
