= 1919 U.S. National Championships – Men's singles =

Men's singles
- 1919 U.S. National Championships

Final
- Champion: (United States) Bill Johnston
- Runner-up: (United States) Bill Tilden
- Score: 6–4, 6–4, 6–3

Details
- Draw: 128
- Seeds: –

Events
Singles	men	women
Doubles	men	women
- U.S. National Championships

Bill Johnston defeated Bill Tilden in the final, 6–4, 6–4, 6–3 to win the men's singles tennis title at the 1919 U.S. National Championships. It was Johnston's second U.S. Championships singles title, after 1915.

The competition had an unseeded draw of 128 players.

== Draw ==
Key

- Q = Qualifier
- WC = Wild card
- LL = Lucky loser
- Alt = Alternate
- ITF = ITF entry
- PR = Protected ranking
- SR = Special ranking
- SE = Special exempt
- JE = Junior exempt
- JR = Junior Accelerator Programme entrant
- CO = College Accelerator Programme entrant
- NG = Next Gen Accelerator Program entrant
- w/o = Walkover
- r = Retired
- d = Defaulted

=== Final eight ===
Quarterfinals
(United States) Robert Lindley Murray	7	1	2	4
(United States) Bill Johnston	4	6	6	6
(United States) Wallace F. Johnson	6	6	6
(United States) Walter Merrill Hall	4	0	2
(United States) Bill Tilden	1	6	7	6
(Australia) Norman Brookes	6	4	5	3
(United States) R. Norris Williams	6	6	6
(United States) Maurice McLoughlin	0	3	2

Semifinals
(United States) Bill Johnston	2	6	6	6
(United States) Wallace F. Johnson	6	1	3	3
(United States) Bill Tilden	6	7	6
(United States) R. Norris Williams	1	5	3

Final
(United States) Bill Johnston	6	6	6
(United States) Bill Tilden	4	4	3

=== Earlier rounds ===
==== Section 1 ====
First round
(United States) Seabury	10	6	6
(United States) Lamb	8	2	3
(United States) Williams
(United States) Simmons	w/	o
(United States) Murray	6	6	6
(United States) Rosenbaum	0	0	0
(United States) Mathey	6	6	6
(United States) Allen	0	1	0
(United States) Doyle	4	6	6	5	6
(United States) Voshell	6	3	3	7	4
(United States) Donaldson	4	6	6	6
(United States) Fox	6	3	1	2
(United States) Anderson	6	3	6	6
(United States) Oelsner	4	6	4	4
(United States) von Bernuth
(United States) Mack	w/	o

Second round
(United States) Seabury	4	4	6	2
(United States) Williams	6	6	4	6
(United States) Murray	6	6	10
(United States) Mathey	2	4	8
(United States) Doyle	6	6	6
(United States) Donaldson	0	1	2
(United States) Anderson	6	6	6
(United States) von Bernuth	1	4	2

Third round
(United States) Williams	2	2	2
(United States) Murray	6	6	6
(United States) Doyle	8	6	6
(United States) Anderson	6	0	2

Fourth round
(United States) Murray	6	6	6
(United States) Doyle	2	2	3

==== Section 2 ====
First round
(United States) Washburn	6	7	6
(United States) Morgenthaler	3	5	3
(United States) Loughman	6	5	6	6
(United States) Chase	2	7	3	3
(United Kingdom) Lycett	8	6	4	6
(United States) Godshall	6	3	6	4
(Australia) Patterson	4	3	6	6	6
(United States) Alexander	6	6	1	2	2
(United States) Parker	6	6	7
(United States) Day	2	2	5
(United States) Ball	4	6	6	6
(United States) Bowman	6	3	3	3
(United States) Dionne	7	6	6
(United States) Adams	5	1	2
(United States) Johnston	6	6	6
(United States) Brunie	1	1	1

Second round
(United States) Washburn	6	6	6
(United States) Loughman	0	3	2
(United Kingdom) Lycett	w/	o
(Australia) Patterson
(United States) Parker	6	3	6	6
(United States) Ball	3	6	0	2
(United States) Dionne	2	5	8	4
(United States) Johnston	6	7	6	6

Third round
(United States) Washburn	5	6	1	6	1
(Australia) Patterson	7	1	6	3	6
(United States) Parker	1	4	4
(United States) Johnston	6	6	6

Fourth round
(Australia) Patterson	2	6	4	5
(United States) Johnston	6	3	6	7

==== Section 3 ====
First round
(Japan) Kashio	6	6	6
(United States) O'Boyle	1	4	2
(United States) Niles	6	6	6
(United States) Ewing	0	1	0
(United States) Adoue	6	7	2	6
(United States) Emerson	1	5	6	3
(United States) Hoerr
(United States) Johnson	w/	o
(United States) Johnson	6	6	6
(United States) Benedict	2	1	3
(United States) Kirkland	7	6	6
(United States) O'Boyle	5	2	3
(United States) Toussaint	6	7	2	4	6
(United States) Chapin Jr.	4	5	6	6	3
(United States) Taylor	6	6	6
(United States) Murdock	1	0	2

Second round
(Japan) Kashio	1	2	4
(United States) Niles	6	6	6
(United States) Adoue	8	6	6
(United States) Hoerr	6	3	1
(United States) Johnson	6	6	6
(United States) Kirkland	1	2	3
(United States) Toussaint	4	3	3
(United States) Taylor	6	6	6

Third round
(United States) Niles	6	8	6
(United States) Adoue	0	6	0
(United States) Johnson	6	6	6
(United States) Taylor	1	1	2

Fourth round
(United States) Niles	6	4	2	1
(United States) Johnson	4	6	6	6

==== Section 4 ====
First round
(United States) Pell	1	6	6	6
(United States) Taylor	6	3	1	4
(United States) Merriam	6	6	6
(United States) Hames	2	1	2
(United States) Van Vliet
(United States) Nickerson	w/	o
(United States) Charest	7	6	6
(United States) Cassils	5	2	2
(United States) Merrill Hall	6	8	6
(United States) Chapin Sr.	3	6	0
(United States) Harran	7	6	6
(United States) Richey	5	4	2
(United States) Van Deventer	6	6	8
(United States) Pike	2	4	6
(United States) Kelleher	6	6	6
(United States) Groesbeck	3	2	0

Second round
(United States) Pell	6	6	6
(United States) Merriam	0	1	2
(United States) Van Vliet	5	6	6	6
(United States) Charest	7	2	3	4
(United States) Merrill Hall	6	6	7
(United States) Harran	4	4	5
(United States) Van Deventer	3	3	2
(United States) Kelleher	6	6	6

Third round
(United States) Pell	6	6	6
(United States) Van Vliet	1	4	2
(United States) Merrill Hall	6	8	6
(United States) Kelleher	1	6	2

Fourth round
(United States) Pell	1	7	6	3
(United States) Merrill Hall	6	9	0	6

==== Section 5 ====
First round
(United States) Tilden
(United States) Nering	w/	o
(United States) Thomas
(United States) Inman	w/	o
(United States) Anderson	6	5	6	6
(United States) Hobart	1	7	0	3
(United States) Biddle	6	6	6
(United States) Fall	4	2	0
(Japan) Kumagae	6	6	6
(United States) Brubans	0	0	1
(United States) Van Deventer	6	6	6
(United States) Healy	4	4	2
(United States) LeRoy	6	6	6
(United States) Obear	4	1	0
(United States) Griffin
(United States) Fox	w/	o

Second round
(United States) Tilden	6	6	6
(United States) Thomas	2	2	2
(United States) Anderson	3	1	5
(United States) Biddle	6	6	7
(Japan) Kumagae	6	6	6
(United States) Van Deventer	2	3	3
(United States) LeRoy	4	2	6	6	6
(United States) Griffin	6	6	2	0	4

Third round
(United States) Tilden	6	4	6	6
(United States) Biddle	3	6	4	0
(Japan) Kumagae	6	6	7
(United States) LeRoy	3	4	5

Fourth round
(United States) Tilden	6	6	1	4	6
(Japan) Kumagae	4	1	6	6	2

==== Section 6 ====
First round
(Australia) Brookes	6	6	6
(United States) Pate	0	3	1
(United States) Wesbrook	6	6	7
(United States) Gatcomb	3	2	5
(United States) Donaldson	6	6	6
(United States) Burroughs	4	4	4
(United States) Benedict	6	6	8
(United States) Soper	4	3	6
(United States) Garland	6	6	6
(United States) Stockton	3	2	2
(United States) James	6	7	6
(United States) Werner	2	5	3
(United States) Hammett	3	6	6	6
(United States) Davis	6	2	2	4
(United States) Davenport	6	6	6
(United States) Symington	3	1	2

Second round
(Australia) Brookes	6	6	6
(United States) Wesbrook	0	0	4
(United States) Donaldson	7	3	8
(United States) Benedict	9	6	10
(United States) Garland	6	6	6
(United States) James	3	1	1
(United States) Hammett	6	6	6
(United States) Davenport	2	1	2

Third round
(Australia) Brookes	6	6	6
(United States) Benedict	0	2	1
(United States) Garland	6	6	6
(United States) Hammett	1	4	2

Fourth round
(Australia) Brookes	6	6	1	2	7
(United States) Garland	1	2	6	6	5

==== Section 7 ====
First round
(United States) Gallon	6	0	3	6	6
(United States) Anderson	0	6	6	3	4
(United States) Davis	3	7	6	10
(United States) Dana	6	5	3	8
(United States) Richards	6	6	7
(United States) Jester	2	2	5
(United States) Williams	6	6	6
(United States) Baggs	3	4	4
(United States) Bassford	7	1	6	4	7
(United States) King	5	6	3	6	5
(United States) Fisher	2	7	6	7
(United States) Sachs	6	5	3	5
(Australia) Thomas	6	6	6
(United States) Compton	0	1	1
(United States) Mahan
(United States) Fulton	w/	o

Second round
(United States) Gallon	2	2	3
(United States) Davis	6	6	6
(United States) Richards	5	1	2
(United States) Williams	7	6	6
(United States) Bassford	6	6	7
(United States) Fisher	2	4	5
(Australia) Thomas	8	6	6
(United States) Mahan	6	2	1

Third round
(United States) Davis	2	2	2
(United States) Williams	6	6	6
(United States) Bassford	5	2	2
(Australia) Thomas	7	6	6

Fourth round
(United States) Williams	4	6	6	7
(Australia) Thomas	6	4	0	5

==== Section 8 ====
First round
(United States) Kynaston	6	6	3	4	6
(United States) Allen	1	0	6	6	2
(United States) Seaver	6	6	4	6
(United States) Barker	2	3	6	4
(United States) Chambers	6	6	6
(United States) Magee	4	4	1
(United States) Sweeney
(United States) McClave	w/	o
(United States) Curley
(United States) Behr	w/	o
(United States) McLoughlin	6	6	6
(United States) Cragin	3	0	2
(United States) Drake	3	6	6	6
(United States) Gill	6	3	3	3
(United States) Beekman	4	6	6	6
(United States) Iler	6	3	4	4

Second round
(United States) Kynaston	4	2	6	3
(United States) Seaver	6	6	0	5	rtd.
(United States) Chambers	2	6	6	6
(United States) Sweeney	6	4	2	3
(United States) Curley	2	1	5
(United States) McLoughlin	6	6	7
(United States) Drake	2	4	1
(United States) Beekman	6	6	6

Third round
(United States) Kynaston	6	6	3	6
(United States) Chambers	1	3	6	2
(United States) McLoughlin	6	8	6
(United States) Beekman	3	6	3

Fourth round
(United States) Kynaston	2	2	6
(United States) McLoughlin	6	6	8

Preceded by 1919 Wimbledon Championships	Grand Slams; Men's Singles	Succeeded by 1920 Australasian Championships
