= 1920 U.S. National Championships – Men's singles =

Men's singles
- 1920 U.S. National Championships

Final
- Champion: (United States) Bill Tilden
- Runner-up: (United States) Bill Johnston
- Score: 6–1, 1–6, 7–5, 5–7, 6–3

Details
- Draw: 128
- Seeds: N.A.

Events
Singles	men	women
Doubles	men	women
- U.S. National Championships

Bill Tilden defeated Bill Johnston in the final, 6–1, 1–6, 7–5, 5–7, 6–3 to win the men's singles tennis title at the 1920 U.S. National Championships. It was Tilden's first U.S. Championships singles title, the first of an eventual record seven such titles, and his second major singles title overall.

== Draw ==
Key

- Q = Qualifier
- WC = Wild card
- LL = Lucky loser
- Alt = Alternate
- ITF = ITF entry
- PR = Protected ranking
- SR = Special ranking
- SE = Special exempt
- JE = Junior exempt
- JR = Junior Accelerator Programme entrant
- CO = College Accelerator Programme entrant
- NG = Next Gen Accelerator Program entrant
- w/o = Walkover
- r = Retired
- d = Defaulted

=== Final eight ===
Quarterfinals
(United States) George Caner	6	6	6
(United States) Irving Wright	3	4	2
(United States) Watson Washburn	4	4	5
(United States) Bill Johnston	6	6	7
(United States) Clarence Griffin	1	3	6	4
(United States) Wallace Johnson	6	6	2	6
(United States) Bill Tilden	6	8	6
(United States) Walter Wesbrook	3	6	1

Semifinals
(United States) George Caner	3	6	6	4
(United States) Bill Johnston	6	4	8	8
(United States) Wallace Johnson	12	4	4
(United States) Bill Tilden	14	6	6

Final
(United States) Bill Johnston	1	6	5	7	3
(United States) Bill Tilden	6	1	7	5	6

=== Earlier rounds ===
==== Section 1 ====
First round
(United States) Baggs	6	6	8
(United States) Fisher	0	3	6
(United States) McKay	6	6	6
(United States) Hathaway	2	3	2
(United States) Mahan	6	6	1
(United States) Vanneman	1	1	0	rtd.
(United States) Van Deventer	6	6	5	3	6
(United States) Burrill	4	4	7	6	4
(United States) Botsford	6	6	6
(United States) Parsons	1	1	4
(United States) Bowman	6	6	7	6
(United States) Merriam	3	2	9	3
(United States) Ewing	1	7	9	3	6
(United States) Inman	6	5	7	6	3
(United States) Caner	4	6	6	6
(United States) Hayes	6	2	2	4

Second round
(United States) Baggs	6	4	6	6
(United States) McKay	4	6	4	4
(United States) Mahan	6	2	6	6
(United States) Van Deventer	3	6	1	1
(United States) Botsford	1	6	6	5	6
(United States) Bowman	6	2	3	7	4
(United States) Ewing	3	1	1
(United States) Caner	6	6	6

Third round
(United States) Baggs	3	6	1	1
(United States) Mahan	6	2	6	6
(United States) Botsford	4	0	9	4
(United States) Caner	6	6	7	6

Fourth round
(United States) Mahan	1	3	2
(United States) Caner	6	6	6

==== Section 2 ====
First round
(United States) Dionne	6	6	6
(United States) Fisher	0	0	1
(United States) Emerson	6	6	6	9
(United States) Morgenthaler	2	4	8	7
(United States) Fischer	3	6	6	6
(United States) Brubans	6	3	3	2
(United States) Wright	6	8	4	1	6
(United States) Allen	4	6	6	6	2
(United States) Burdick	4	6	8	6
(United States) Kirkland	6	1	6	2
(United States) Donaldson	6	6	1	6
(United States) Norton	4	1	6	2
(United States) Vernon	3	6	6	6
(United States) Fall	6	3	2	1
(United States) Kynaston	6	6	6
(United States) O'Boyle	2	1	2

Second round
(United States) Dionne	6	4	4	7
(United States) Emerson	3	6	6	9
(United States) Fischer	2	6	2	2
(United States) Wright	6	2	6	6
(United States) Burdick	6	6	6
(United States) Donaldson	3	4	2
(United States) Vernon	3	3	2
(United States) Kynaston	6	6	6

Third round
(United States) Emerson	1	0	2
(United States) Wright	6	6	6
(United States) Burdick	6	6	3	6
(United States) Kynaston	3	1	6	4

Fourth round
(United States) Wright	6	6	9
(United States) Burdick	4	2	7

==== Section 3 ====
First round
(United States) Knox	6	6	4	6
(United States) Obear	2	4	6	2
(United States) Havens	6	6	1	1	6
(United States) Appleby	0	2	6	6	3
(United States) Washburn	6	6	6
(United States) Magee	3	4	3
(United States) Throckmorton	7	6	4	6
(United States) LeRoy	5	2	6	3
(United States) Anderson	9	6	3	6
(United States) Seaver	7	2	6	4
(United States) Ostendorf	2	6	9	6
(United States) Anderson	6	3	7	1
(United States) Garland	6	6	6
(United States) Stockton	0	1	1
(United States) Benedict	6	6	6
(United States) Johnson	0	1	1

Second round
(United States) Knox	3	6	6	6
(United States) Havens	6	0	2	3
(United States) Washburn	7	0	6	6
(United States) Throckmorton	5	6	4	0
(United States) Anderson	6	4	6	6
(United States) Ostendorf	1	6	2	3
(United States) Garland	6	6	6
(United States) Benedict	2	0	0

Third round
(United States) Knox	3	1	5
(United States) Washburn	6	6	7
(United States) Anderson	2	0	4
(United States) Garland	6	6	6

Fourth round
(United States) Washburn	7	7	7
(United States) Garland	5	5	5

==== Section 4 ====
First round
(United States) Voshell	6	6	6
(United States) Nehring	1	0	2
(United States) Williams	8	3	6	10
(United States) Hunter	6	6	2	8
(United States) Davis	4	6	4	6	6
(United States) Pell	6	0	6	1	1
(United States) Morgan	6	10	9	7
(United States) Sachs	3	12	7	5
(United States) Johnston	6	6	10
(United States) Fischer	2	3	8
(United States) Hammett	6	6	6
(United States) Chase	2	3	1
(United States) Dabney	6	6	6
(United States) Vories	3	3	2
(United States) Niles
(United States) Adoue	w/	o

Second round
(United States) Voshell	6	2	5	3
(United States) Williams	3	6	7	6
(United States) Davis	6	6	6
(United States) Morgan	2	4	2
(United States) Johnston	6	6	6
(United States) Hammett	2	4	4
(United States) Dabney	1	4	rtd.
(United States) Niles	6	6

Third round
(United States) Williams	4	6	6	6
(United States) Davis	6	4	4	2
(United States) Johnston	6	8	7	6
(United States) Niles	4	10	5	2

Fourth round
(United States) Williams	3	4	5
(United States) Johnston	6	6	7

==== Section 5 ====
First round
(United States) Alexander	9	6	6	6
(United States) Rosenbaum	11	2	2	3
(United States) James	2	2	7
(United States) Dana	6	6	5	rtd.
(United States) Griffin	7	6	6
(United States) Cawse	5	3	2
(United States) Harte	6	6	6
(United States) McClave	1	1	1
(United States) Bassford	6	2	6	6
(United States) Charest	4	6	4	2
(United States) Behr	6	6	7
(United States) Toland	2	1	5
(United States) Fox	8	7	6	6
(United States) Anderson	6	5	8	3
(United States) Lowrey	6	6	6
(United States) Pate	2	3	3

Second round
(United States) Alexander	6	6	6
(United States) James	3	2	2
(United States) Griffin	6	7	7
(United States) Harte	2	5	5
(United States) Bassford	6	7	6
(United States) Behr	1	5	2
(United States) Fox	4	6	3	6	0
(United States) Lowrey	6	3	6	4	6

Third round
(United States) Alexander	w/	o
(United States) Griffin
(United States) Bassford	6	6	4	2	3
(United States) Lowrey	4	3	6	6	6

Fourth round
(United States) Griffin	6	6	6
(United States) Lowrey	2	3	1

==== Section 6 ====
First round
(United States) Robinson	6	6	6
(United States) Dudley	0	4	1
(United States) Mathey	6	6	6
(United States) Duane	4	3	3
(United States) Johnson	6	6	6
(United States) Iler	1	1	4
(United States) Ingraham	6	6	6
(United States) Soper	1	2	3
(United States) Hennessey	6	7	6
(United States) Hockmeyer	2	5	3
(United States) Weber	6	6	7
(United States) Martin	4	4	5
(United States) Roberts	12	6	6
(United States) Major	10	2	1
(United States) Nickerson	6	6	6
(United States) Felstiner	1	1	1

Second round
(United States) Robinson	1	3	3
(United States) Mathey	6	6	6
(United States) Johnson	6	6	6
(United States) Ingraham	4	0	1
(United States) Hennessey	6	6	6
(United States) Weber	4	3	3
(United States) Roberts	6	6	6
(United States) Nickerson	2	0	0

Third round
(United States) Mathey	w/	o
(United States) Johnson
(United States) Hennessey	1	5	6	3
(United States) Roberts	6	7	3	6

Fourth round
(United States) Johnson	6	3	6	4	6
(United States) Roberts	2	6	3	6	4

==== Section 7 ====
First round
(United States) Curley	6	7	11
(United States) Collom	2	5	9
(United States) Hardy	6	6	6
(United States) Gallon	2	3	4
(United States) Tilden	6	6	6
(United States) Rice	4	3	2
(United States) Ackerland	6	6	3	6
(United States) Seabury	0	0	6	2
(United States) Richards	6	6	2	6
(United States) Parker	2	2	6	0
(United States) Beekman	6	6	6
(United States) Healey	2	2	1
(United States) Oelsner
(United States) Kelleher	w/	o
(United States) Josties	6	6	6
(United States) Snow	1	2	3

Second round
(United States) Curley	3	2	3
(United States) Hardy	6	6	6
(United States) Tilden	6	6	9
(United States) Ackerland	3	4	7
(United States) Richards	6	6	6
(United States) Beekman	3	2	4
(United States) Oelsner	3	7	4	4
(United States) Josties	6	5	6	6

Third round
(United States) Hardy	6	2	4	2
(United States) Tilden	3	6	6	6
(United States) Richards	6	6	6
(United States) Josties	4	1	1

Fourth round
(United States) Tilden	6	3	6	6
(United States) Richards	3	6	3	0

==== Section 8 ====
First round
(United States) Broockman	1	6	2	6	6
(United States) Anderson	6	2	6	2	0
(United States) Day
(United States) Bastian	w/	o
(United States) Bull	6	8	6
(United States) Peaslee	4	6	4
(United States) Baggs
(United States) Merrill Hall	w/	o
(United States) Bruneau	6	6	6
(United States) Drexel Biddle	2	0	2
(United States) Wesbrook	6	6	6
(United States) Richey	4	2	0
(United States) Nicholl	7	6	2	5	6
(United States) Toussaint	5	3	6	7	2
(United States) Van Deventer	6	6	6
(United States) Drake	2	0	2

Second round
(United States) Broockman	6	6	6
(United States) Day	2	3	3
(United States) Bull	8	2	6	6	9
(United States) Baggs	6	6	2	8	11
(United States) Bruneau	2	3	0
(United States) Wesbrook	6	6	6
(United States) Nicholl	4	1	3
(United States) Van Deventer	6	6	6

Third round
(United States) Broockman	8	8	6
(United States) Baggs	6	6	4
(United States) Wesbrook	6	6	6
(United States) Van Deventer	4	1	3

Fourth round
(United States) Broockman	1	4	2
(United States) Wesbrook	6	6	6

Preceded by 1920 Wimbledon Championships	Grand Slams; Men's Singles	Succeeded by 1921 Australasian Championships
