= 1916 U.S. National Championships – Men's singles =

Men's singles
- 1916 U.S. National Championships

Final
- Champion: (United States) R. Norris Williams
- Runner-up: (United States) William Johnston
- Score: 4–6, 6–4, 0–6, 6–2, 6–4

Details
- Draw: 128
- Seeds: N.A.

Events
Singles	men	women
Doubles	men	women
- U.S. National Championships

Richard Norris Williams defeated the defending champion William Johnston in the final, 4–6, 6–4, 0–6, 6–2, 6–4 to win the men's singles tennis title at the 1916 U.S. National Championships.

The event was played on outdoor grass courts and held at the West Side Tennis Club in Forest Hills, New York from Monday, August 28 through Tuesday, September 5, 1916.

== Draw ==
=== Final eight ===
Quarterfinals
(United States) Wallace F. Johnson	4	2	2
(United States) Clarence Griffin	6	6	6
(United States) Douglas Watters	6	1	1
(United States) R. Norris Williams	3	6	6
(United States) Watson Washburn	2	2	5
(United States) William Johnston	6	6	7
(United States) George Church	6	6	2	4	4
(United States) R. Lindley Murray	3	4	6	6	6

Semifinals
(United States) Clarence Griffin	3	3	3
(United States) R. Norris Williams	6	6	6
(United States) William Johnston	6	6	6
(United States) Robert Lindley Murray	2	3	1

Final
(United States) R. Norris Williams	4	6	0	6	6
(United States) William Johnston	6	4	6	2	4

=== Earlier rounds ===
==== Section 1 ====
First round
(United States) Adoue	6	1	1
(United States) Voshell	8	6	6
(United States) Van Deventer	4	2	6	6	6
(United States) Rogers	8	6	3	4	4
(United States) Johnson	w	o
(United States) Seymour
(United States) Allen	4	3	7
(United States) Rosenbaum	6	6	9
(United States) Plimpton	3	6	6	7
(Austria-Hungary) Salm	6	1	4	5
(United States) Man	4	6	4	12	6
(United States) Van Dyke Johns	6	2	6	10	2
(United States) Plimpton
(United States) Hall	w	o
(United States) Anderson	w	o
(United States) Garland

Second round
(United States) Voshell	6	6	6
(United States) Van Deventer	3	2	3
(United States) Johnson	6	6	7
(United States) Rosenbaum	1	2	5
(United States) Plimpton	2	4	2
(United States) Man	6	6	6
(United States) Merrill Hall	5	4	4
(United States) Anderson	7	6	6

Third round
(United States) Voshell	8	6	2	7	3
(United States) Johnson	6	3	6	9	6
(United States) Man	3	2	3
(United States) Merrill Hall	6	6	6

Fourth round
(United States) Johnson	6	6	6
(United States) Merrill Hall	2	1	2

==== Section 2 ====
First round
(United States) Bull	4	6	0	3
(United States) Rand	6	3	6	6
(United States) Roberts	w	o
(United States) Copeland
(United States) Burden
(United States) Cook	w	o
(United States) Baggs	6	0	2
(United States) Griffin	8	6	9
(United States) Cragin	6	6	6
(United States) Maynard	4	0	0
(United States) Baggs	6	6	6
(United States) Stair	3	2	2
(United States) French	6	6	6
(United States) Peak	4	3	4
(United States) Dawson	2	3	1
(United States) Whitney	6	6	6

Second round
(United States) Rand	6	6	6
(United States) Roberts	1	1	1
(United States) Cook	4	2	1
(United States) Griffin	6	6	6
(United States) Cragin	6	2	3	6	4
(United States) Baggs	2	6	6	4	6
(United States) French	3	4	4
(United States) Whitney	6	6	6

Third round
(United States) Rand	3	0	4
(United States) Griffin	6	6	6
(United States) Baggs	4	2	4
(United States) Whitney	6	6	6

Fourth round
(United States) Griffin	6	6	3	12
(United States) Whitney	3	2	6	10

==== Section 3 ====
First round
(United States) Harvey	w	o
(United States) McKearin
(United States) Neely
(United States) McCormick	w	o
(United States) Riker	8	6	6	2	6
(United States) Phillips	10	3	1	6	2
(United States) Parker	6	6	6
(United States) Gibbons	4	1	0
(United States) Watters	w	o
(United States) Holden
(United States) Binzen	1	7	4	6	6
(United States) King	6	5	6	4	2
(United States) Johnston	3	6	4	3
(United States) Dionne	6	4	6	6
(United States) Hartel	1	0	2
(United States) Burrows	6	6	6

Second round
(United States) Harvey	3	5	3
(United States) McCormick	6	7	6
(United States) Riker	2	3	1
(United States) Parker	6	6	6
(United States) Watters	6	6	6
(United States) Binzen	1	2	4
(United States) Dionne	6	6	2	6
(United States) Burrows	4	1	6	4

Third round
(United States) McCormick	7	2	6	6
(United States) Parker	5	6	1	4
(United States) Watters	6	2	1
(United States) Dionne	3	6	1	r

Fourth round
(United States) McCormick	2	3	4
(United States) Watters	6	6	6

==== Section 4 ====
First round
(United States) Mahan	7	6	6
(United States) Peaffman	5	4	2
(United States) Oshman	2	1	3
(United States) Mixsell	6	6	6
(Japan) Mikami	2	2	1
(United States) Clothier	6	6	6
(United States) Sweet
(United States) Frelinghuysen	w/	o
(United States) Harte	6	7	6
(United States) Thayer	2	5	3
(United States) Drake	0	3	4
(United States) Major	6	6	6
(United States) Van Deventer	8	3	2	6	1
(United States) LeRoy	6	6	6	2	6
(United States) Williams	6	6	6
(United States) Weber	1	1	1

Second round
(United States) Mahan	6	6	7
(United States) Mixsell	2	2	5
(United States) Clothier	6	6	6
(United States) Sweet	3	0	2
(United States) Harte	6	4	6	6	6
(United States) Major	4	6	8	3	8
(United States) LeRoy	2	5	1
(United States) Williams	6	7	6

Third round
(United States) Mahan	0	1	8	6	5
(United States) Clothier	6	6	6	3	7
(United States) Major	1	5	0
(United States) Williams	6	7	6

Fourth round
(United States) Clothier	7	5	4	1
(United States) Williams	5	7	6	6

==== Section 5 ====
First round
(United States) Knox	2	2	5
(United States) Little	6	6	7
(United States) Jones	2	7	0	7
(United States) Prentice	6	5	6	9
(United States) Roberts	4	9	6	6
(United States) Biddle	6	7	3	4
(United States) Armstrong	6	3	6	1
(United States) Davis	8	6	1	6
(United States) Bourne	0	0	2
(United States) Van Vliet	6	6	6
(United States) Fixman	2	2	2
(United States) Washburn	6	6	6
(United States) MacPherson	10	6	6
(United States) Inman	8	2	0
(United States) Mathey	6	6	6
(United States) Pell	3	2	0

Second round
(United States) Little	1	4	1
(United States) Prentice	6	6	6
(United States) Roberts	5	5	3
(United States) Davis	7	7	6
(United States) Van Vliet	3	1	4
(United States) Washburn	6	6	6
(United States) MacPherson	4	5	6	6
(United States) Mathey	6	7	2	8

Third round
(United States) Prentice	2	3	4
(United States) Davis	6	6	6
(United States) Washburn	4	6	6	6
(United States) Mathey	6	1	2	4

Fourth round
(United States) Davis	3	6	4	5
(United States) Washburn	6	4	6	7

==== Section 6 ====
First round
(United States) Beekman	2	6	6	6
(United States) Wright	6	2	0	3
(United States) Tilden	6	4	2	6
(United States) Throckmorton	4	6	6	8
(United States) Palmer	2	4	1
(United States) Pate	6	6	6
(United States) Nathan	4	2	1
(United States) MacMullen	6	6	6
(United States) Hunter	6	6	6
(United States) Coffey	2	2	1
(United States) Johnston	6	6	6
(United States) Notman	1	0	0
(United States) Harrison	2	0	0
(United States) Niles	6	6	6
(United States) McClure	w/	o
(United States) Kirkland

Second round
(United States) Beekman	6	6	7
(United States) Throckmorton	4	4	5
(United States) Pate	8	6	4	2	1
(United States) MacMullen	6	3	6	6	6
(United States) Hunter	1	4	4
(United States) Johnston	6	6	6
(United States) Niles	6	6	6
(United States) Kirkland	1	2	1

Third round
(United States) Beekman	6	6	6
(United States) MacMullen	2	3	0
(United States) Johnston	6	6	6
(United States) Niles	2	3	2

Fourth round
(United States) Beekman	2	3	2
(United States) Johnston	6	6	6

==== Section 7 ====
First round
(United States) Pell	6	6	6
(United States) Peaslee	1	2	2
(United States) O'Neale	2	2	4
(United States) Alexander	6	6	6
(United States) Hawkes	7	6	8	0	6
(United States) Rand	9	4	6	6	4
(United States) McLoughlin	6	6	6
(United States) McClave	0	1	2
(United States) Church	6	6	6
(United States) Chase	0	1	1
(United States) Geer	0	0	0
(Japan) Kumagae	6	6	6
(United States) Warren	6	6	6
(United States) Chambers	2	0	0
(United States) Walker	3	2	6	1
(United States) Clover	6	6	4	6

Second round
(United States) Pell	6	6	2	6
(United States) Alexander	4	3	6	3
(United States) Hawkes	1	2	4
(United States) McLoughlin	6	6	6
(United States) Church	6	6	6
(Japan) Kumagae	3	3	1
(United States) Warren	6	6	6
(United States) Clover	4	2	2

Third round
(United States) Pell	3	4	3
(United States) McLoughlin	6	6	6
(United States) Church	6	6	6
(United States) Warren	3	4	0

Fourth round
(United States) McLoughlin	7	1	2	3
(United States) Church	5	6	6	6

==== Section 8 ====
First round
(United States) Sweet	w/	o
(United States) Thomas
(United States) Murray
(United States) Dabney	w/	o
(United States) Von Maur	w/	o
(United States) Faul
(United States) Bassford	6	1	3	1
(United States) Stevens	2	6	6	6
(United States) Doyle	6	6	2	4	4
(United States) Behr	2	2	6	6	6
(United States) Weber	8	7	8	7
(United States) Randolph	6	9	6	5
(United States) Larned	6	6	6
(United States) McCord	3	0	1
(United States) Wightman	6	7	7
(United States) Cushman	2	5	5

Second round
(United States) Thomas	3	2	2
(United States) Murray	6	6	6
(United States) Fall	0	2	1
(United States) Stevens	6	6	6
(United States) Behr	6	6	6
(United States) Weber	2	3	2
(United States) Larned	3	6	6	6
(United States) Wightman	6	3	3	3

Third round
(United States) Murray	6	6	6
(United States) Stevens	1	0	0
(United States) Behr	6	6	6
(United States) Larned	4	2	1

Fourth round
(United States) Murray	6	6	3	9
(United States) Behr	4	3	6	7
