= 1915 U.S. National Championships – Men's singles =

Men's singles
- 1915 U.S. National Championships

Final
- Champion: (United States) William Johnston
- Runner-up: (United States) Maurice McLoughlin
- Score: 1–6, 6–0, 7–5, 10–8

Events
Singles	men	women
Doubles	men	women
- U.S. National Championships

William Johnston defeated Maurice McLoughlin 1–6, 6–0, 7–5, 10–8 in the final to win the men's singles tennis title at the 1915 U.S. National Championships. The event was held at the West Side Tennis Club in Forest Hills, New York in the United States.

== Draw ==
=== Finals ===
Quarterfinals
(United States) Clarence Griffin	2	1	8	7	1
(United States) William Johnston	6	6	6	5	6
(United States) R. Norris Williams	8	7	6
(United States) William Rand	6	5	1
(United States) Frank Hunter	2	4	0
(United States) Maurice McLoughlin	6	6	6
(United States) Irving Wright	3	1	1
(United States) Theodore Pell	6	6	6

Semifinals
(United States) William Johnston	5	6	5	6	6
(United States) R. Norris Williams	7	4	7	2	2
(United States) Maurice McLoughlin	6	6	7
(United States) Theodore Pell	2	0	5

Final
(United States) William Johnston	1	6	7	10
(United States) Maurice McLoughlin	6	0	5	8

=== Earlier rounds ===
==== Section 1 ====
First round
(United States) Graves	6	6	6
(United States) Johnson	3	4	4
(United States) McKay	3	6	6	2	1
(United States) Dawson	6	2	4	6	6
(United States) Cunningham	3	6	5	3
(United States) Garland	6	3	7	6
(United States) Griffin	6	6	6
(United States) Thayer	2	2	1
(United States) Wightman	3	1	7	4
(United States) MacMullen	6	6	5	6
(United States) Cady	3	4	6	6
(United States) Toland	6	6	2	8
(United States) O'Neale	9	6	6
(United States) Blair	7	2	2
(United States) Major	6	2	4	5
(United States) Law	4	6	6	7

Second round
(United States) Graves	2	6	8
(United States) Dawson	6	8	10
(United States) Garland	3	6	2	3
(United States) Griffin	6	2	6	6
(United States) Wightman	6	6	6
(United States) Toland	3	1	1
(United States) O'Neale	6	2	4	4
(United States) Law	4	6	6	6

Third round
(United States) Dawson	3	5	2
(United States) Griffin	6	7	6
(United States) Wightman	7	6	4	5	4
(United States) Law	5	2	6	7	6

Fourth round
(United States) Griffin	6	6	6
(United States) Law	2	4	2

==== Section 2 ====
First round
(United States) Man	6	6	6	6	2
(United States) Watters	4	1	8	8	6
(United States) Anderson	4	0	6
(United States) Tallant	6	6	8
(United States) Hackett	1	2	8
(United States) Johnston	6	6	10
(United States) Pell	6	9	9
(United States) Turnbull	1	7	7
(United States) Martin	1	3	6
(United States) Behr	6	6	8
(United States) Bowman	2	4	0
(United States) Phillips	6	6	6
(United States) Parker	6	4	6	6
(United States) Chambers	3	6	2	3
(United States) Rosenbaum	5	3	0
(United States) LeRoy	7	6	6

Second round
(United States) Watters	6	6	6
(United States) Tallant	1	2	4
(United States) Johnston	8	6	6
(United States) Pell	6	4	4
(United States) Behr	6	6	6
(United States) Phillips	0	3	4
(United States) Parker	2	4	8
(United States) LeRoy	6	6	10

Third round
(United States) Watters	2	1	2
(United States) Johnston	6	6	6
(United States) Behr	4	6	6	6
(United States) LeRoy	6	4	4	4

Fourth round
(United States) Johnston	3	6	6	7
(United States) Behr	6	3	2	5

==== Section 3 ====
First round
(United States) Palmer	2	3	1
(United States) Thomas	6	6	6
(United States) Eaton	4	7	0	4
(United States) Copeland	6	5	6	6
(United States) Adoue	3	6	6	6
(United States) Brinsmade	6	2	3	1
(United States) Stevens	6	3	6	6
(United States) Kidder	4	6	2	3
(United States) Inman	7	6	6
(United States) Childs	5	2	3
(United States) Riker	w/	o
(United States) Williams
(United States) Johnson	6	6	6
(United States) Hooker	0	1	1
(United States) Hall	6	0	6	6
(United States) Burrows	2	6	1	2

Second round
(United States) Thomas	3	6	6	6
(United States) Copeland	6	2	4	3
(United States) Adoue	6	1	6	2	7
(United States) Stevens	3	6	4	6	5
(United States) Inman	5	1	7
(United States) Williams	7	6	9
(United States) Johnson	16	6	2	6	2
(United States) Hall	18	4	6	4	6

Third round
(United States) Thomas	2	5	4
(United States) Adoue	6	7	6
(United States) Williams	6	9	2	6
(United States) Hall	3	7	6	1

Fourth round
(United States) Adoue	3	1	0
(United States) Williams	6	6	6

==== Section 4 ====
First round
(United States) Forster	2	3	2
(United States) Biddle	6	6	6
(United States) Rand	3	2	2
(United States) Peaslee	6	6	6
(United States) Knox	6	4	6	6
(United States) Geary	4	6	4	2
(United States) Grinnell	6	6	6
(United States) Robinson	2	2	2
(United States) Blackstone	7	4	7	6
(United States) Fall	5	6	5	1
(United States) Pate	3	6	7	6
(United States) Drake	6	3	5	2
(United States) Thomas	0	9	1	7	4
(United States) Rand	6	7	6	5	6
(United States) Plitt	6	6	6
(United States) Da Silva	1	0	2

Second round
(United States) Biddle	6	6	6
(United States) Peaslee	2	1	0
(United States) Knox	5	2	1
(United States) Grinnell	7	6	6
(United States) Blackstone	1	1	4
(United States) Pate	6	6	6
(United States) Rand	6	6	6
(United States) Plitt	0	0	2

Third round
(United States) Biddle	6	6	6
(United States) Grinnell	1	2	2
(United States) Pate	1	4	1
(United States) Rand	6	6	6

Fourth round
(United States) Biddle	6	3	3	6	3
(United States) Rand	3	6	6	2	6

==== Section 5 ====
First round
(United States) Henshaw	4	1	1
(United States) Anderson	6	6	6
(United States) Hunter	6	6	6
(United States) Sargeant	3	2	2
(United States) Dionne	7	6	11
(United States) De Camp	5	2	9
(United States) Vaile	2	6	7	6
(United States) McAllister	6	4	5	4
(United States) Cole	w/	o
(United States) Post
(United States) Brown	3	6	0	2
(United States) Pfaffman	6	3	6	6
(United States) Campbell	6	6	7
(United States) Doubleday	3	2	5
(United States) Allen	7	6	5	6	7
(United States) Gibbons	9	1	7	0	5

Second round
(United States) Anderson	5	6	6	1	1
(United States) Hunter	7	4	4	6	6
(United States) Dionne	6	6	6
(United States) Vaile	3	0	2
(United States) Post	3	0	0
(United States) Pfaffman	6	6	6
(United States) Campbell	7	6	3	6
(United States) Allen	5	3	6	2

Third round
(United States) Hunter	10	6	2	2	6
(United States) Dionne	8	3	6	6	3
(United States) Pfaffman	7	6	6
(United States) Campbell	5	4	1

Fourth round
(United States) Hunter	3	6	6	2	6
(United States) Pfaffman	6	3	3	6	3

==== Section 6 ====
First round
(United States) Stoddart	6	3	7	6
(United States) Wood	3	6	5	1
(United States) Allen	w/	o
(United States) Beekman
(United States) Roberts	1	5	0
(United States) Mathey	6	7	6
(United States) Kuhn	1	1	0
(United States) McLoughlin	6	6	6
(United States) Cragin	6	8	6
(United States) Johnston	8	10	8
(United States) Voshell	6	6	6
(United States) McClave	3	4	2
(United States) Roberts	3	6	4	6	4
(United States) Roberts	6	0	6	4	6
(United States) Niles	3	7	5	10	2
(United States) Alexander	6	5	7	8	6

Second round
(United States) Wood	1	1	2
(United States) Beekman	6	6	6
(United States) Mathey	1	2	6
(United States) McLoughlin	6	6	8
(United States) Johnston	2	6	2
(United States) Voshell	6	8	6
(United States) Roberts	4	1	1
(United States) Alexander	6	6	6

Third round
(United States) Beekman	2	6	2	2
(United States) McLoughlin	6	3	6	6
(United States) Voshell	4	4	2
(United States) Alexander	6	6	6

Fourth round
(United States) McLoughlin	6	6	1	6
(United States) Alexander	3	2	6	3

==== Section 7 ====
First round
(United States) Prentice	6	6	6
(United States) Bourne	0	3	0
(United States) Coffey	6	6	6
(United States) Swain	4	4	1
(United States) Baggs	6	6	6
(United States) Boocock	0	1	2
(United States) Andrews	3	2	3
(United States) Phillips	6	6	6
(United States) Sommer	0	0	0
(United States) Wright	6	6	6
(United States) Cushman	2	2	1
(United States) Caner	6	6	6
(United States) Frelinghuysen	6	6	8
(United States) Thomas	2	1	6
(United States) Riker	5	1	6	5
(United States) Harvey	7	6	4	7

Second round
(United States) Prentice	6	7	7	6
(United States) Coffey	8	5	5	1
(United States) Baggs	9	2	6	4	0
(United States) Phillips	7	6	4	6	6
(United States) Wright	6	0	6	6
(United States) Caner	2	6	1	3
(United States) Frelinghuysen	3	6	9	4	6
(United States) Harvey	6	1	7	6	4

Third round
(United States) Prentice	6	6	5	6
(United States) Phillips	0	3	7	0
(United States) Wright	6	6	6
(United States) Frelinghuysen	3	2	0

Fourth round
(United States) Prentice	5	4	1
(United States) Wright	7	6	6

==== Section 8 ====
First round
(United States) Whitney	6	4	6	6
(United States) Throckmorton	3	6	4	1
(United States) Pell	6	6	6
(United States) Fox	2	0	2
(United States) Newhouse	0	2	4
(United States) Washburn	6	6	6
(United States) McKenzie	1	0	2
(United States) Church	6	6	6
(United States) Nettleton	4	9	2	5
(United States) Bassford	6	7	6	7
(United States) Bull	4	12	6	6
(United States) Mahan	6	10	2	4
(United States) Van Deventer	4	3	2
(United States) Plummer	6	6	6
(United States) Harris	6	6	6
(United States) Russell	1	1	1

Second round
(United States) Whitney	3	4	6	3
(United States) Pell	6	6	0	6
(United States) Washburn	7	9	6	6
(United States) Church	5	11	4	2
(United States) Bassford	6	4	4	2
(United States) Bull	4	6	6	6
(United States) Plummer	1	1	1
(United States) Harris	6	6	6

Third round
(United States) Pell	6	6	6
(United States) Washburn	4	4	3
(United States) Bull	8	7	5	6
(United States) Harris	6	5	7	2

Fourth round
(United States) Pell	6	6	6
(United States) Bull	1	2	3
