= 1916 in tennis =

This page covers all the important events in the sport of tennis in 1916. It provides the results of notable tournaments throughout the year on both the men's and women's ILTF tennis circuits.

== Australian Open ==
No event.

== French Open ==
Not a Grand Slam event.

== Wimbledon ==
No event.

== US Open ==
Category	Champion(s)	Finalist(s)	Score
Men's singles	(United States) R. Norris Williams	(United States) William Johnston	4–6, 6–4, 0–6, 6–2, 6–4
Women's singles	(Norway) Molla Bjurstedt	(United States) Louise Hammond Raymond	6–0, 6–1
Men's doubles	(United States) Bill Johnston (United States) Clarence Griffin	(United States) Maurice McLoughlin (United States) Ward Dawson	6–4, 6–3, 5–7, 6–3
Women's doubles	(Norway) Molla Bjurstedt (United States) Eleonora Sears	(United States) Louise Hammond Raymond (United States) Edna Wildey	4–6, 6–2, 10–8
Mixed doubles	(United States) Eleonora Sears (United States) Willis E. Davis	(United States) Florence Ballin (United States) Bill Tilden	6–4, 7–5
