= 1924 U.S. National Championships – Men's singles =

Men's singles
- 1924 U.S. National Championships

Final
- Champion: (United States) Bill Tilden
- Runner-up: (United States) Bill Johnston
- Score: 6–1, 9–7, 6–2

Details
- Draw: 84
- Seeds: N.A.

Events
Singles	men	women		boys	girls
Doubles	men	women	mixed	boys	girls
- U.S. National Championships

Four-time defending champion Bill Tilden defeated Bill Johnston in the final, 6–1, 9–7, 6–2 to win the men's singles tennis title at the 1924 U.S. National Championships. It was Tilden's fifth U.S. Championships singles title and seventh major singles title overall.

== Draw ==
Key

- Q = Qualifier
- WC = Wild card
- LL = Lucky loser
- Alt = Alternate
- ITF = ITF entry
- PR = Protected ranking
- SR = Special ranking
- SE = Special exempt
- JE = Junior exempt
- JR = Junior Accelerator Programme entrant
- CO = College Accelerator Programme entrant
- NG = Next Gen Accelerator Program entrant
- w/o = Walkover
- r = Retired
- d = Defaulted

=== Final eight ===
Quarterfinals
(United States) Bill Tilden	6	6	3	6
(United States) Howard Kinsey	3	4	6	3
(United States) Vincent Richards	6	6	11
(United States) Wallace Johnson	1	4	9
(United States) Bill Johnston	6	6	6
(France) René Lacoste	3	3	3
(United States) George Lott	1	4	3
(Australia) Gerald Patterson	6	6	6

Semifinals
(United States) Bill Tilden	4	6	8	4	6
(United States) Vincent Richards	6	2	6	6	4
(United States) Bill Johnston	6	6	6
(Australia) Gerald Patterson	2	0	0

Final
(United States) Bill Tilden	6	9	6
(United States) Bill Johnston	1	7	2

=== Earlier rounds ===
==== Section 1 ====
First round

Second round
(United States) Tilden	6	3	6	6
(Spain) Alonso	2	6	3	4
(United States) Williams	6	6	6
(United States) Barr	0	2	0
(Canada) Wright	3	7	6	8
(United States) Weinstein	6	5	3	6
(United States) Kelleher	0	9	6	6
(Australia) Brookes	6	7	2	2

Third round
(United States) Tilden	6	6	6
(United States) Williams	0	2	1
(Canada) Wright	6	6	0	6
(United States) Kelleher	2	3	6	4

Fourth round
(United States) Tilden	6	8	6
(Canada) Wright	4	6	4

==== Section 2 ====
First round

Second round
(United States) Kinsey	1	6	7	8	6
(United States) King	6	4	9	6	3
(United States) von Bernuth	6	7	9
(United States) Thayer	3	5	7
(United States) Reid	6	6	6
(United States) Niles	3	4	0
(Australia) O'Hara Wood	6	6	6
(United States) Throckmorton	1	2	2

Third round
(United States) Kinsey	6	6	6
(United States) von Bernuth	3	3	4
(United States) Reid	2	6	7	4	11
(Australia) O'Hara Wood	6	0	5	6	9

Fourth round
(United States) Kinsey	6	3	6	6
(United States) Reid	2	6	3	4

==== Section 3 ====
First round
(Japan) Fukuda
(Japan) Shimizu	w/	o

Second round
(United States) Richards	6	6	6
(Mexico) Llano	1	2	2
(United States) Bowman	5	6	6	6
(United States) Binzen	7	1	4	4
(United States) Mathey	6	8	3	3	6
(Australia) Kalms	1	6	6	6	1
(United States) Pearson	4	4	1
(Japan) Fukuda	6	6	6

Third round
(United States) Richards	6	6	6
(United States) Bowman	1	1	1
(United States) Mathey	6	6	6
(Japan) Fukuda	4	0	1

Fourth round
(United States) Richards	6	6	6
(United States) Mathey	1	3	4

==== Section 4 ====
First round
(United States) Hunter	6	6	6
(United States) Major	4	4	2
(United States) Mercur	6	6	6
(United States) Jester	2	2	2
(United States) Johnson	4	6	6	6
(United States) Emerson	6	2	4	2
(United States) Dunham	6	6	8
(United States) Van Ryn	4	2	6
(United States) Hennessey	1	6	6	3	6
(Japan) Harada	6	1	2	6	2
(China) Kong	6	6	6
(United States) Dabney	2	3	1
(United States) Feibleman	7	6	8	6	7
(United States) Anderson	9	4	10	1	5
(France) Borotra	6	6	6
(United States) Fischer	2	4	3

Second round
(United States) Hunter	6	2	7	6
(United States) Mercur	2	6	5	4
(United States) Johnson	6	6	4	6
(United States) Dunham	4	1	6	1
(United States) Hennessey	6	6	6
(China) Kong	4	3	3
(United States) Feibleman	3	8	3	6	5
(France) Borotra	6	6	6	3	7

Third round
(United States) Hunter	8	3	6	4	4
(United States) Johnson	6	6	4	6	6
(United States) Hennessey	8	7	3	6
(France) Borotra	6	5	6	2

Fourth round
(United States) Johnson	6	6	6
(United States) Hennessey	4	4	1

==== Section 5 ====
First round
(United States) Johnston	6	6	6
(United States) Seeligson	3	0	3
(Australia) Schlesinger	3	8	6	9
(United States) Dailey	6	6	3	7
(United States) Brown	4	6	4	6	6
(United States) Parker	6	0	6	3	4
(United States) Voshell	6	6	6
(United States) Whitbeck	0	1	2
(United States) Howard	2	6	6	6
(Canada) Morrice	6	1	2	0
(United States) Griffin	6	6	6
(United States) Baker	2	4	4
(United States) Lang	6	1	4	6	6
(United States) Kynaston	2	6	6	4	3
(Japan) Okamoto
(United States) Rice	w/	o

Second round
(United States) Johnston	6	6	6
(Australia) Schlesinger	3	3	3
(United States) Brown	7	7	6
(United States) Voshell	5	5	2
(United States) Howard	2	4	4
(United States) Griffin	6	6	6
(United States) Lang	4	6	2	2
(Japan) Okamoto	6	2	6	6

Third round
(United States) Johnston	6	6	6
(United States) Brown	2	1	1
(United States) Griffin	6	6	6
(Japan) Okamoto	2	3	4

Fourth round
(United States) Johnston	6	6	6
(United States) Griffin	2	1	1

==== Section 6 ====
First round
(South Africa) Norton	6	4	6	6
(United States) Griffin	1	6	3	3

Second round
(United States) Norton	6	7	6
(United States) Merrill Hall	3	5	0
(United States) Wesbrook	6	6	6
(United States) Guild	0	3	3
(United States) Caldwell	6	6	6
(United States) Meyer	3	3	2
(France) Lacoste	6	6	6
(United States) Paré	4	2	2

Third round
(South Africa) Norton	6	6	6
(United States) Wesbrook	1	3	3
(United States) Caldwell	4	3	1
(France) Lacoste	6	6	6

Fourth round
(South Africa) Norton	6	3	0	1
(France) Lacoste	1	6	6	6

==== Section 7 ====
First round

Second round
(United States) Lott	6	6	1	6
(United States) Williams	1	1	6	4
(Canada) Crocker	6	6	4	6
(United States) Whitlock	3	4	6	4
(United States) Thalheimer	6	6	8
(United States) Pell	3	3	6
(United States) Chapin	6	0	6	6
(France) Brugnon	2	6	1	2

Third round
(United States) Lott	6	6	6
(Canada) Crocker	4	2	3
(United States) Thalheimer	8	3	3
(United States) Chapin	10	6	6

Fourth round
(United States) Lott	6	7	16
(United States) Chapin	4	5	14

==== Section 8 ====
First round

Second round
(United States) Snodgrass
(United States) White	w/	o
(United States) Washburn	6	2	6	6
(United States) Kinsey	1	6	4	4
(France) Gerbault	6	6	6
(United States) Newell	4	1	3
(Australia) Patterson	6	6	7	6
(United States) Martin	4	4	9	0

Third round
(United States) Snodgrass	6	4	1	2
(United States) Washburn	2	6	6	6
(France) Gerbault	4	1	1
(Australia) Patterson	6	6	6

Fourth round
(United States) Washburn	4	3	4
(Australia) Patterson	6	6	6

Preceded by 1924 Wimbledon Championships	Grand Slams; Men's Singles	Succeeded by 1925 Australasian Championships
