= 1918 U.S. National Championships – Men's singles =

Men's singles
- 1918 U.S. National Championships

Final
- Champion: (United States) Robert Lindley Murray
- Runner-up: (United States) Bill Tilden
- Score: 6–3, 6–1, 7–5

Details
- Draw: 87
- Seeds: –

Events
Singles	men	women
Doubles	men	women
- U.S. National Championships

Defending champion Robert Lindley Murray defeated Bill Tilden in the final, 6–3, 6–1, 7–5 to win the men's singles tennis title at the 1918 U.S. National Championships.

The event was held at the West Side Tennis Club in Forest Hills, Queens, from August 26 through September 3, 1918.

== Final eight ==
Quarterfinals
(United States) Craig Biddle	2	3	5
(United States) S. Howard Voshell	6	6	7
(United States) Nathaniel Niles	5	4	6	5
(United States) R. Lindley Murray	7	6	2	7
(United States) Lyle Mahan	6	6	1	2
(Japan) Ichiya Kumagae	8	3	6	6
(United States) Bill Tilden	3	6	5	7	6
(United States) Walter Merrill Hall	6	1	7	5	1

Semifinals
(United States) S. Howard Voshell	4	3	6
(United States) R. Lindley Murray	6	6	8
(Japan) Ichiya Kumagae	2	2	0
(United States) Bill Tilden	6	6	6

Final
(United States) R. Lindley Murray	6	6	7
(United States) Bill Tilden	3	1	5

=== Earlier rounds ===
==== Section 1 ====
First round

Second round
(United States) Biddle	6	6	6
(United States) Ewing	2	4	4
(United States) O'Boyle	1	3	4
(United States) Cassils	6	6	6
(United States) Stockton	1	4	2
(United States) Morgenthaler	6	6	6
(United States) Rosenbaum	w/	o
(United States) Simmons

Third round
(United States) Biddle	6	6	6
(United States) Cassils	0	2	1
(United States) Morgenthaler	6	6	6
(United States) Simmons	2	1	2

Fourth round
(United States) Biddle	6	6	6
(United States) Morgenthaler	0	3	3

==== Section 2 ====
First round

Second round
(United States) Voshell	6	6	6
(United States) Richey	0	1	3
(United States) Bretz
(United States) Fulton	w/	o
(United States) Richards
(United States) Nathan	w/	o
(United States) Keresey	3	4	6	1
(United States) Anderson	6	6	2	6

Third round
(United States) Voshell	6	6	6
(United States) Bretz	3	0	1
(United States) Richards	6	6	6
(United States) Anderson	1	3	3

Fourth round
(United States) Voshell	5	4	6	6	7
(United States) Richards	7	6	0	2	5

==== Section 3 ====
First round
(United States) Niles	6	6	6
(United States) Hane	2	0	1
(United States) Johnson	0	6	0	3
(United States) Gallon	6	3	6	6
(United States) Chapin Jr.	6	6	6
(United States) Burghard	3	4	2
(United States) Bowman	2	4	4
(United States) Burdick	6	6	6

Second round
(United States) Gatcomb	2	6	6	13	6
(United States) Emerson	6	2	0	15	2
(United States) Binzen	6	6	6
(United States) Fox	1	3	2
(United States) Niles	6	6	6
(United States) Gallon	1	4	2
(United States) Chapin Jr.	3	1	1
(United States) Burdick	6	6	6

Third round
(United States) Gatcomb	2	6	1	4
(United States) Binzen	6	2	6	6
(United States) Niles	7	6	2	7
(United States) Burdick	5	4	6	5

Fourth round
(United States) Binzen	5	0	2
(United States) Niles	7	6	6

==== Section 4 ====
First round
(United States) Wagner	0	2	2
(United States) Alexander	6	6	6
(United States) Czintz	2	1	3
(United States) Chapin Sr.	6	6	6
(United States) Larned	1	1	4
(United States) Baggs	6	6	6
(United States) Throckmorton	6	6	11	7	13
(United States) Taylor	8	2	9	9	11
(United States) Pell	6	6	6
(United States) Hughes	2	2	3
(United States) Dana	6	6	6
(United States) Iler	2	3	0
(United States) Dudley	0	0	1
(United States) Murray	6	6	6
(United States) Anderson	6	4	4	5
(United States) Kelleher	0	6	6	7

Second round
(United States) Alexander	6	6	6
(United States) Chapin Sr.	2	2	1
(United States) Baggs	4	2	6	5
(United States) Throckmorton	6	6	3	7
(United States) Pell	2	6	6	6
(United States) Dana	6	3	2	3
(United States) Murray
(United States) Kelleher	w/	o

Third round
(United States) Alexander	2	3	7	6	6
(United States) Throckmorton	6	6	5	0	3
(United States) Pell	2	0	0
(United States) Murray	6	6	6

Fourth round
(United States) Alexander	8	6	0	6	0
(United States) Murray	6	8	6	4	6

==== Section 5 ====
First round
(United States) Wabrausek	6	6	6
(United States) Groesbeck	4	2	2
(United States) Parker	6	6	6
(United States) Burroughs	4	0	0
(United States) Vail	6	5	6	13	6
(United States) Pope	2	7	1	15	2
(United States) Pike	6	6	6
(United States) Miller	1	0	3
(United States) Gravem	1	3	3
(United States) Mahan	6	6	6
(United States) O'Boyle	6	3	3	6	6
(United States) Thomas	1	6	6	1	4
(United States) Anderson	3	5	1
(Japan) Kashio	6	7	6
(United States) Dionne	6	6	6
(United States) Fall	0	2	0

Second round
(United States) Wabrausek	0	2	1
(United States) Parker	6	6	6
(United States) Vail	9	0	4
(United States) Pike	11	6	6
(United States) Mahan	6	7	7
(United States) O'Boyle	0	5	5
(Japan) Kashio	6	7	6	7
(United States) Dionne	1	9	3	5

Third round
(United States) Parker	6	6	6
(United States) Pike	3	3	0
(United States) Mahan	8	8	6	8
(Japan) Kashio	6	6	8	6

Fourth round
(United States) Parker	2	2	3
(United States) Mahan	6	6	6

==== Section 6 ====
First round
(United States) Drake	6	6	6
(United States) Kynaston	2	3	4
(United States) Wright
(United States) James	w/	o
(United States) Healy	0	1	0
(United States) Gilbert	6	6	6

Second round
(United States) Drake	0	0	2
(United States) Wright	6	6	6
(United States) Gilbert	5	2	3
(United States) Dunham	7	6	6
(Japan) Kumagae	6	6	6
(United States) Pate	0	4	0
(United States) Wightman	6	3	6	6
(United States) Whelan	2	6	3	4

Third round
(United States) Wright	6	6	6
(United States) Dunham	4	2	3
(Japan) Kumagae	6	6	6
(United States) Wightman	3	2	2

Fourth round
(United States) Wright	6	6	1	2
(Japan) Kumagae	8	3	6	6

==== Section 7 ====
First round

Second round
(United States) Bassford	6	9	5	6	3
(United States) King	4	11	7	0	6
(United States) Horrell	1	2	2
(United States) Doyle	6	6	6
(United States) Nielsen	2	3	7
(United States) Burrows	6	6	9
(United States) Gibbons	w/	o
(United States) Tilden

Third round
(United States) King	3	3	3
(United States) Doyle	6	6	6
(United States) Burrows	1	3	3
(United States) Tilden	6	6	6

Fourth round
(United States) Doyle	3	1	5
(United States) Tilden	6	6	7

==== Section 8 ====
First round

Second round
(United States) Cumming	2	2	2
(United States) Hayes	6	6	6
(United States) Hendrickson	6	6	7
(United States) Behr	2	3	5
(United States) Wright	6	6	6
(United States) Kaltenbach	1	0	2
(United States) Donaldson	0	1	3
(United States) Merrill Hall	6	6	6

Third round
(United States) Hayes	6	6	6
(United States) Hendrickson	1	2	2
(United States) Wright	6	5	1	2
(United States) Merrill Hall	4	7	6	6

Fourth round
(United States) Hayes	6	4	6	4	4
(United States) Merrill Hall	3	6	0	6	6
