= Edward Whitney =

American tennis player

- Full name: Edward H. Whitney
- Country (sports): United States
- Born: 1891; Boston, Massachusetts, United States

Singles

Grand Slam singles results
- US Open: SF (1910)

Edward H. Whitney was an American tennis player active in the early 20th century.

== Tennis career ==
Whitney was interscholastic champion. He reached the semifinals of the U.S. National Championships in 1910 and the quarterfinals in 1909. He also won the NCAA Men's Tennis Championship in 1911 while competing for Harvard University.

=== Grand Slam tournament performance timeline ===
Key
W	F	SF	QF	#R	RR	Q#	DNQ	A	NH

(W) winner; (F) finalist; (SF) semifinalist; (QF) quarterfinalist; (#R) rounds 4, 3, 2, 1; (RR) round-robin stage; (Q#) qualification round; (DNQ) did not qualify; (A) absent; (NH) not held; (SR) strike rate (events won / competed); (W–L) win–loss record.

Tournament	1908	1909	1910	1911	1912	1913	1914	1915	1916
Grand Slam tournaments
Australian Open	A	A	A	A	A	A	A	A	NH
Wimbledon	A	A	A	A	A	A	A	NH	NH
US Open	1R	QF	SF	1R	A	4R	3R	2R	4R
