= Nathaniel Niles (sportsman) =

American figure skater and tennis player

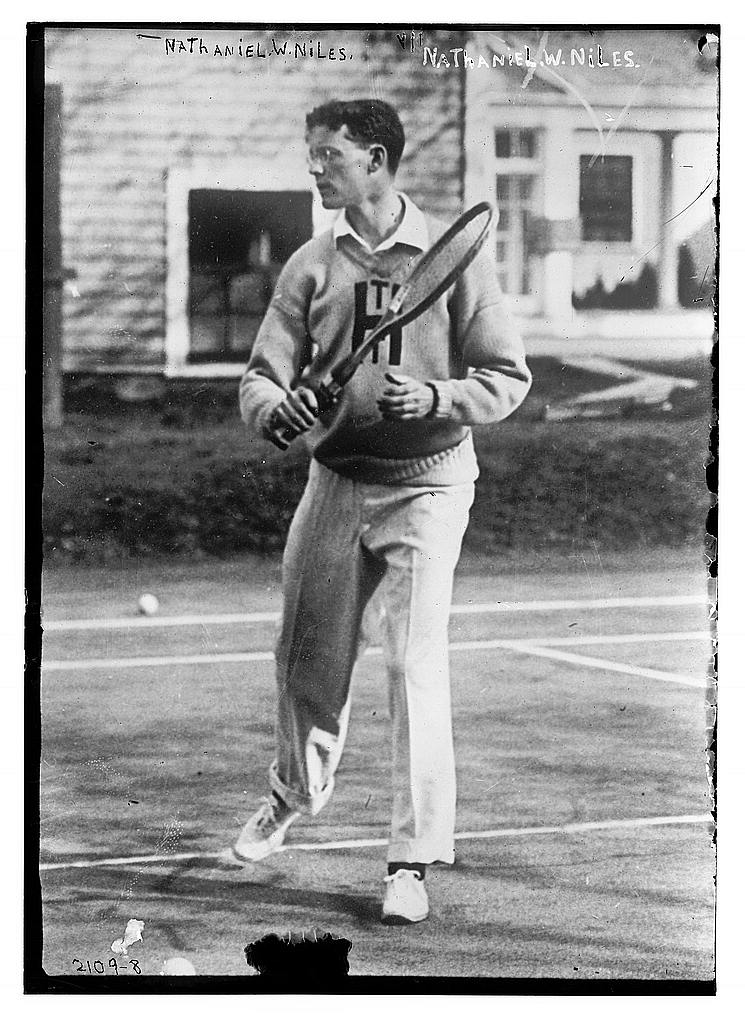
- Full name: Nathaniel William Niles
- Country (sports): United States
- Born: July 5, 1886 Boston, Massachusetts
- Died: July 11, 1932 (aged 46) Brookline, Massachusetts
- Turned pro: 1904 (amateur tour)
- Retired: 1921

Singles
- Career record: 316-130 (70.8%)
- Career titles: 19

Grand Slam singles results
- US Open: F (1917)

Other tournaments
- WHCC: 2R (1920)

Grand Slam mixed doubles results
- US Open: W (1908)

Nathaniel Niles
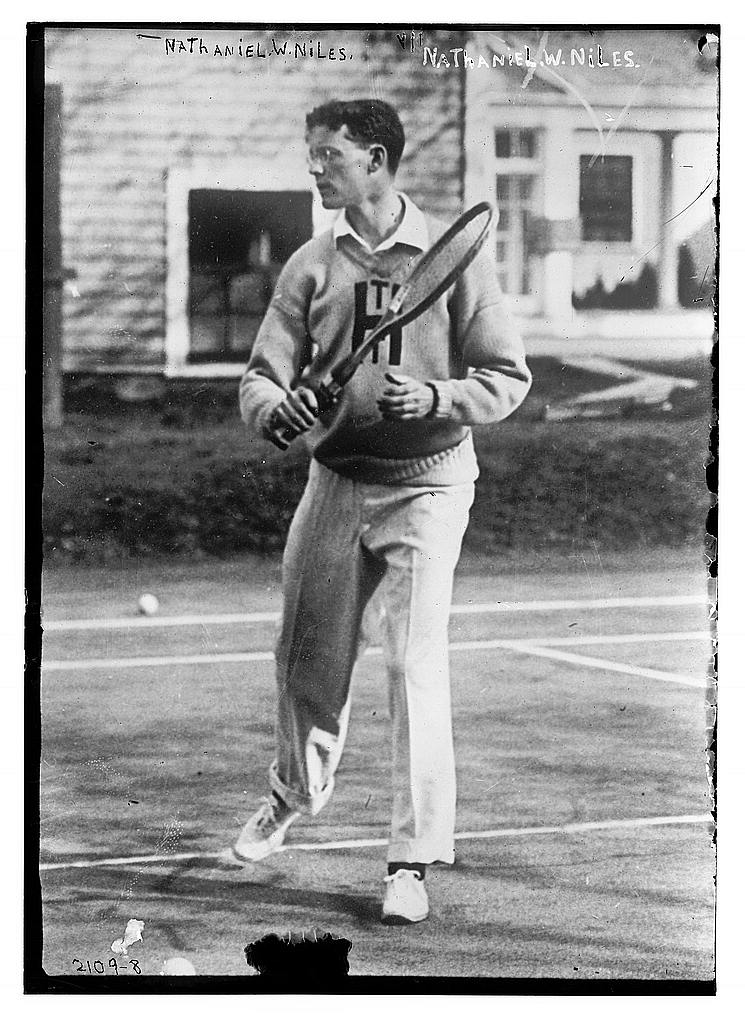

Figure skating career
- Skating club: SC of Boston
Medal record
Representing United States
Men's Figure skating
North American Championships
Silver medal – second place	1925 Boston	Men's singles
Pairs Figure skating
North American Championships
Silver medal – second place	1929 Boston	Pairs
Silver medal – second place	1927 Toronto	Pairs
Gold medal – first place	1925 Boston	Pairs
Silver medal – second place	1923 Ottawa	Pairs

Nathaniel William "Nat" Niles (July 5, 1886 – July 11, 1932) was an American tennis player and figure skater who competed in single skating, pair skating, and ice dancing between 1914 and 1932. He was born in Boston, Massachusetts and died in Brookline, Massachusetts.

Niles won the U.S. Figure Skating Championships in men's single skating three times and nine national pair skating titles with his partner Theresa Weld Blanchard. Blanchard and Niles also won a five national titles in ice dancing.

Nathaniel W. Niles also excelled at tennis, and was inducted into the New England Tennis Hall of Fame in 2000. While a student at Harvard, he was an NCAA champion for the sport. He competed in 23 successive U.S. National Championships. With Edith Rotch, he won the 1908 mixed doubles title, and in 1917, he reached the singles final, losing to Robert Lindley Murray in four sets. He also reached the semifinals in 1913 and the quarterfinals in 1904, 1911 and 1918.

Niles died in 1932 at the age of 46. His last figure skating competition, with Blanchard, had been the pairs event at the 1932 World Figure Skating Championships earlier the same year.

== Figure skating results ==
=== Singles career ===
Event	1914	1918	1920	1921	1922	1923	1924	1925	1926	1927	1928
Olympic Games			6th				6th				15th
World Championships											10th
North American Championships								2nd			
U.S. Championships	3rd	1st	2nd	2nd	2nd	WD	2nd	1st	2nd	1st	

=== Pairs career ===
(with Theresa Weld Blanchard)

Event	1914	1918	1920	1921	1922	1923	1924	1925	1926	1927	1928	1929	1930	1932
Olympic Games			4th				6th				9th			
World Championships											7th		6th	8th
North American Championships						2nd		1st		2nd		2nd		
U.S. Championships	2nd	1st	1st	1st	1st	1st	1st	1st	1st	1st	2nd	2nd		

== Tennis Grand Slam finals ==
=== Singles (1 runner-up) ===
Result	Year	Championship	Surface	Opponent	Score
Loss	1917	U.S. Championships	Grass	(United States) Robert Lindley Murray	7–5, 6–8, 3–6, 3–6

=== Mixed doubles (1 title) ===
Result	Year	Championship	Surface	Partner	Opponents	Score
Win	1908	U.S. Championships	Grass	(United States) Edith Rotch	(United States) Louise Hammond Raymond (United States) Raymond Little	6–4, 4–6, 6–4

== Tennis performance timeline ==
Key
W	F	SF	QF	#R	RR	Q#	DNQ	A	NH

(W) winner; (F) finalist; (SF) semifinalist; (QF) quarterfinalist; (#R) rounds 4, 3, 2, 1; (RR) round-robin stage; (Q#) qualification round; (DNQ) did not qualify; (A) absent; (NH) not held; (SR) strike rate (events won / competed); (W–L) win–loss record.

Events with a challenge round: (W_{C}) won; (CR) lost the challenge round; (F_{A}) all comers' finalist

	1904	1905	1906	1907	1908		1909	1910	1911	1912		1913	1914	1915	1916	1917	1918	1919	1920	1921	1922	1923	1924	1925	1926	SR	W–L	Win %
Grand Slam tournaments
French	Only for French club members													Not held					Only for French club members					A	A	0 / 0	0–0	–
Wimbledon	A	A	A	A	A		A	A	A	A		A	A	Not held				A	A	A	A	A	A	A	A	0 / 0	0–0	–
U.S.	QF	1R	1R	4R	2R		4R	3R	QF	4R		SF	5R	1R	3R	F	QF	4R	3R	2R	1R	1R	2R	2R	1R	0 / 23	39–23	62.9
Australian	NH	A	A	A	A		A	A	A	A		A	A	A	Not held			A	A	A	A	A	A	A	A	0 / 0	0–0	–
Win–loss	2–1	0–1	0–1	3–1	1–1		1–1	1–1	5–1	2–1		5–1	3–1	0–1	2–1	5–1	4–1	3–1	1–1	1–1	0–1	0–1	0–1	0–1	0–1	0 / 23	39–23	62.9
National representation
Olympics	A	Not held			A	A	Not held			A	A	Not held							A	Not held			A	Not held		0 / 0	0–0	–

Note: The U.S. National Championships from 1908 to 1914 had 5 rounds before the quarter finals.
