= Fred Inman =

American tennis player

- Full name: Frederick Clark Inman
- Country (sports): United States
- Born: June 7, 1881
- Died: December 16, 1929
- Plays: Left-handed (one-handed backhand)

Singles

Grand Slam singles results
- Wimbledon: 2R (1920)
- US Open: QF (1909)

Frederick Clark Inman (June 7, 1881 - December 16, 1929) was an American tennis player active in the early 20th century.

== Tennis career ==
Inman reached the quarterfinals of the U.S. National Championships in 1909.

=== Grand Slam tournament performance timeline ===
Key
W	F	SF	QF	#R	RR	Q#	DNQ	A	NH

(W) winner; (F) finalist; (SF) semifinalist; (QF) quarterfinalist; (#R) rounds 4, 3, 2, 1; (RR) round-robin stage; (Q#) qualification round; (DNQ) did not qualify; (A) absent; (NH) not held; (SR) strike rate (events won / competed); (W–L) win–loss record.

Tournament	1907	1908	1909	1910	1911	1912	1913	1914	1915	1916	1917	1918	1919	1920
Grand Slam tournaments
Australian Open	A	A	A	A	A	A	A	A	A	NH	NH	NH	A	A
Wimbledon	A	A	A	A	A	A	A	A	NH	NH	NH	NH	A	2R
US Open	4R	2R	QF	4R	Q1	3R	2R	4R	2R	1R	1R	A	1R	1R
