= 1919 U.S. National Championships – Women's singles =

Women's singles
- 1919 U.S. National Championships

Final
- Champion: (United States) Hazel Hotchkiss Wightman
- Runner-up: (United States) Marion Zinderstein
- Score: 6–1, 6–2

Details
- Draw: 56
- Seeds: –

Events
Singles	men	women
Doubles	men	women
- U.S. National Championships

Hazel Hotchkiss Wightman defeated Marion Zinderstein 6–1, 6–2 in the final to win the women's singles tennis title at the 1919 U.S. National Championships. The event was played on outdoor grass courts and held at the Philadelphia Cricket Club in Chestnut Hill, Philadelphia in the United States from June 16 through June 21, 1919. It was the first edition of the event without a challenge round. The final began in fine weather at 2:15 pm on Saturday, June 21, 1920, and lasted 28 1/2 minutes. It was Hazel Wightman's fourth national singles title after 1909, 1910 and 1911.

== Draw ==
=== Final eight ===
Quarterfinals
(United States) Hazel Hotchkiss Wightman	6	6
(United States) Anne Townsend	0	1
(United States) Mrs. Harvey	6	4	6
(United States) Leslie Bancroft	2	6	4
(Norway) Molla Bjurstedt	6	6	6
(United States) Marie Wagner	2	8	4
(United States) Claire Cassel	3	1
(United States) Marion Zinderstein	6	6

Semifinals
(United States) Hazel Hotchkiss Wightman	6	6
(United States) Mrs. Harvey	2	2
(Norway) Molla Bjurstedt	3	4
(United States) Marion Zinderstein	6	6

Finals
(United States) Hazel Hotchkiss Wightman	6	6
(United States) Marion Zinderstein	1	2
