= 1919 U.S. National Championships (tennis) =

Tennis tournament

- Date: August 26 – September 4 (M); June 16 – 20 (W)
- Edition: 39th
- Category: Grand Slam (ITF)
- Surface: Grass
- Location: Forest Hills, Queens; New York City, New York (M); Chestnut Hill, PA, U.S. (W)
- Venue: West Side Tennis Club (M); Philadelphia Cricket Club (W)

Champions

Men's singles
- (United States) Bill Johnston

Women's singles
- (United States) Hazel Hotchkiss Wightman

Men's doubles
- (Australia) Norman Brookes / (Australia) Gerald Patterson

Women's doubles
- (United States) Marion Zinderstein / (United States) Eleanor Goss

Mixed doubles
- (United States) Marion Zinderstein / (United States) Vincent Richards
- U.S. National Championships

The 1919 U.S. National Championships (now known as the US Open) was a tennis tournament that took place on the outdoor grass courts at the West Side Tennis Club, Forest Hills in New York City, New York. The women's tournament was held from June 16 until June 20 while the men's tournament ran from August 26 until September 4. This event marked the 39th staging of the U.S. National Championships and was the second Grand Slam tennis event of the year.

== Champions ==
=== Men's singles ===
(United States) Bill Johnston defeated (United States) Bill Tilden 6–4, 6–4, 6–3

=== Women's singles ===
(United States) Hazel Hotchkiss Wightman defeated (United States) Marion Zinderstein 6–1, 6–2

=== Men's doubles ===
(Australia) Norman Brookes / (Australia) Gerald Patterson defeated (United States) Bill Tilden / (United States) Vincent Richards 8–6, 6–3, 4–6, 4–6, 6–2

=== Women's doubles ===
(United States) Marion Zinderstein / (United States) Eleanor Goss defeated (United States) Eleonora Sears / (United States) Hazel Wightman 10–8, 9–7

=== Mixed doubles ===
(United States) Marion Zinderstein / (United States) Vincent Richards defeated (United States) Florence Ballin / (United States) Bill Tilden 2–6, 11–9, 6–2

Preceded by 1919 Wimbledon Championships	Grand Slams	Succeeded by 1919 Australasian Championships
