= Roland Roberts =

American tennis player

Roland James Roberts
- Country (sports): United States
- Born: October 22, 1897; San Francisco, California
- Died: March 31, 1965; San Francisco, California

Singles

Grand Slam singles results
- US Open: 4R (1920)

Doubles

Grand Slam doubles results
- US Open: F (1920)

Roland Roberts (October 22, 1897 — March 31, 1965) was an American male tennis player.

== Tennis career ==
In 1918 he became the Pacific Coast lawn tennis champion. In a tournament that lacked most of the top class players who were drafted into service due to World War I he defeated Victor Breeden in the final in straight sets.

In 1920 he reached the final of the men's doubles competition at the U.S. National Championships together with Willis E. Davis which they lost to Clarence Griffin and Bill Johnston in three straight sets.

In July 1920 he won the National Clay Court Tennis Championship, played at the South Side Tennis Club in Chicago, after beating Vincent Richards in three straight sets.

As an 18-year-old at the Cincinnati Masters, he reached the quarterfinals in 1916 before falling to Dean Mathey of Princeton, in five sets.

== Grand Slam finals ==
=== Doubles (1 runner-up) ===
Result	Year	Championship	Surface	Partner	Opponents	Score
Loss	1920	U.S. National Championships	Grass	(United States) Willis E. Davis	(United States) Clarence Griffin (United States) Bill Johnston	2–6, 2–6, 3–6
