= Dean Mathey =

American tennis player (1890–1972)

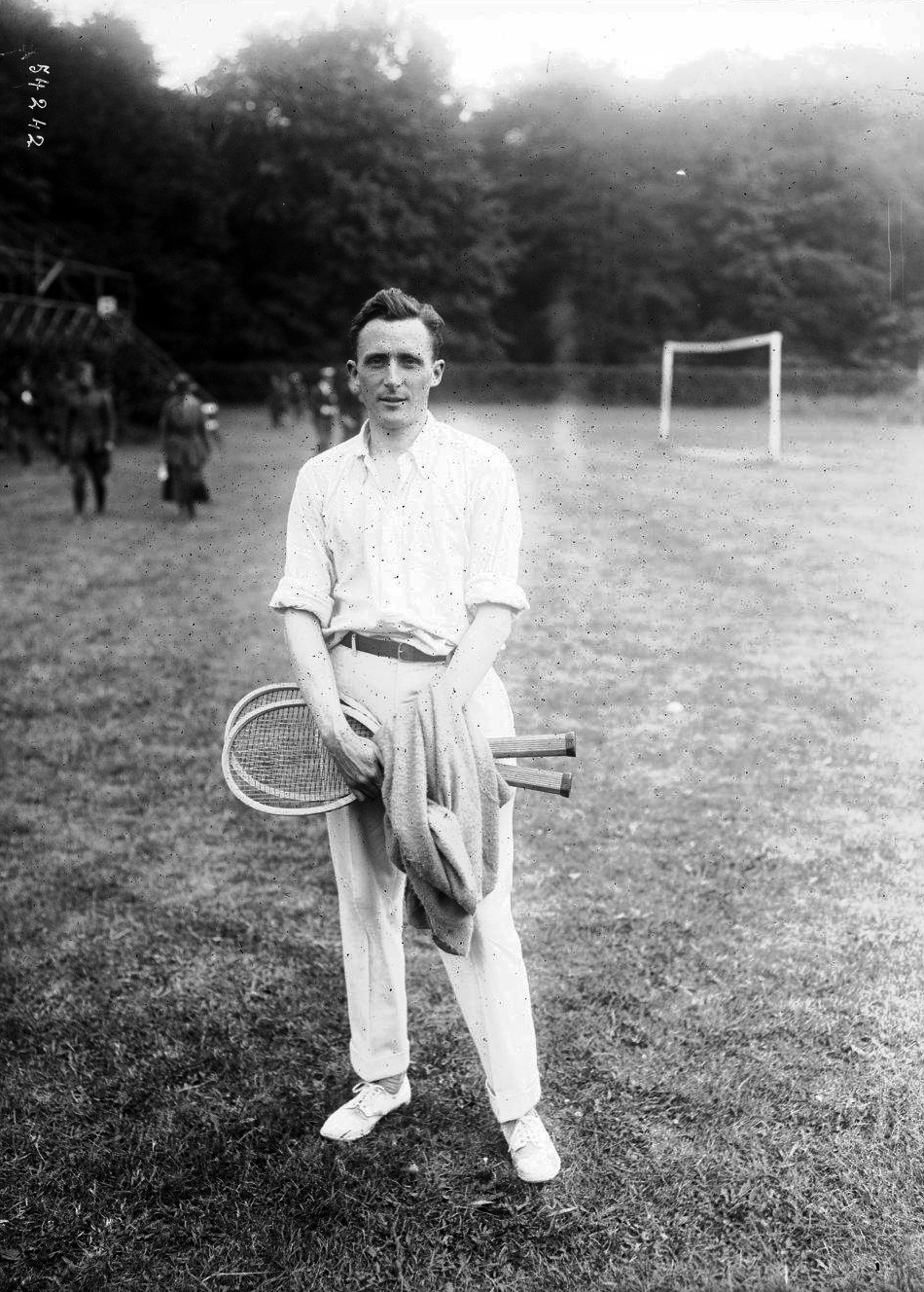
- Mathey in 1919
- Country (sports): United States
- Born: November 23, 1890 Brooklyn, New York
- Died: April 16, 1972 (aged 81) Princeton, New Jersey
- College: Princeton University

Grand Slam singles results
- Wimbledon: 4R (1919)
- US Open: QF (1910)

Other tournaments
- WHCC: 1R (1922)

Grand Slam doubles results
- Wimbledon: SF (1922)
- US Open: F (1914)

Grand Slam mixed doubles results
- Wimbledon: 3R (1922)

Dean Mathey (November 23, 1890 – April 16, 1972) was an American tennis player active in the early 20th century. Namesake of Mathey College at Princeton University, he was raised in Cranford, New Jersey and was a member of the Cranford Golf Club (now called the Echo Lake Country Club). He won the National Clay Court Tennis Doubles Championship twice.

== Tennis career ==
Mathey reached the quarterfinals of the U.S. National Championships in 1910 and the final of the doubles in 1914.

At the Cincinnati Open, he reached the semifinals in 1916 where he lost in four sets (2-6, 6-3, 3-6, 4-6) to William Johnston.

== Princeton University ==
Mathey college was named after Dean Mathey, a 1912 graduate. He was involved with the University for a total of 65 years.

After he graduated, he became a bond salesman, working up to partner of the Dillon, Read & Co. on Wall Street. He became Chairman of the Board of Empire Trust Company and an Honorary Chairman of the Bank of New York.

In 1927 Dean Mathey moved back to the Princeton area, in old farmhouse on the Drumthwacket estate (official residence of New Jersey) on Stockton Street. An Alumni trustee from 1927 till 1931 he began working for his Alma Matter. A charter trustee from 1931- 1960 and trustee Emeritus from then until his death.

Result	Year	Championship	Surface	Partner	Opponents	Score
Loss	1914	U.S. National Championships	Grass	(United States) George Church	(United States) Tom Bundy (United States) Maurice McLoughlin	4–6, 2–6, 4–6

=== Grand Slam tournament performance timeline ===
Key
W	F	SF	QF	#R	RR	Q#	DNQ	A	NH

(W) winner; (F) finalist; (SF) semifinalist; (QF) quarterfinalist; (#R) rounds 4, 3, 2, 1; (RR) round-robin stage; (Q#) qualification round; (DNQ) did not qualify; (A) absent; (NH) not held; (SR) strike rate (events won / competed); (W–L) win–loss record.

Tournament	1907	1908	1909	1910	1911	1912	1913	1914	1915	1916	1917	1918	1919	1920	1921	1922	1923	1924	1925
Grand Slam tournaments
Australian Open	A	A	A	A	A	A	A	A	A	NH	NH	NH	A	A	A	A	A	A	A
French Open	NH	NH	NH	NH	NH	NH	NH	NH	NH	NH	NH	NH	NH	NH	NH	NH	NH	NH	A
Wimbledon	A	A	A	A	A	A	A	A	NH	NH	NH	NH	4R	A	A	2R	A	A	A
US Open	1R	4R	Q1	QF	2R	1R	3R	3R	2R	3R	3R	A	2R	3R	3R	1R	1R	4R	1R
