= George Church (tennis) =

American tennis player

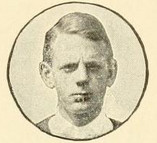
- Church, ca. 1914
- Full name: George Myers Church
- Country (sports): United States
- Born: August 21, 1891 St. Louis, Missouri
- Died: January 19, 1946 (aged 54) Tarrant County, Texas
- Turned pro: 1908 (amateur tour)
- Retired: 1917
- Plays: Right-handed (one-handed backhand)

Singles

Grand Slam singles results
- US Open: QF (1912, 1916)

Doubles

Grand Slam doubles results
- US Open: F (1914)

George Myers Church (August 21, 1891 – January 19, 1946) was an American tennis player active in the early 20th century.

== Tennis career ==
In 1914, Church was ranked No. 7 in the nation in singles and No. 2 in doubles with Dean Mathey.

Church reached the quarterfinals of the U.S. National Championships in 1912 and 1916 (after having to qualify for the event in the former).

Church paired with Mathey to win the doubles title at the 1914 Western Tennis Championship, held that year in Chicago.

A graduate of Princeton University in 1915, Church won the intercollegiate singles title in 1912 and 1914.
