= Henry Ward Dawson =

American tennis player

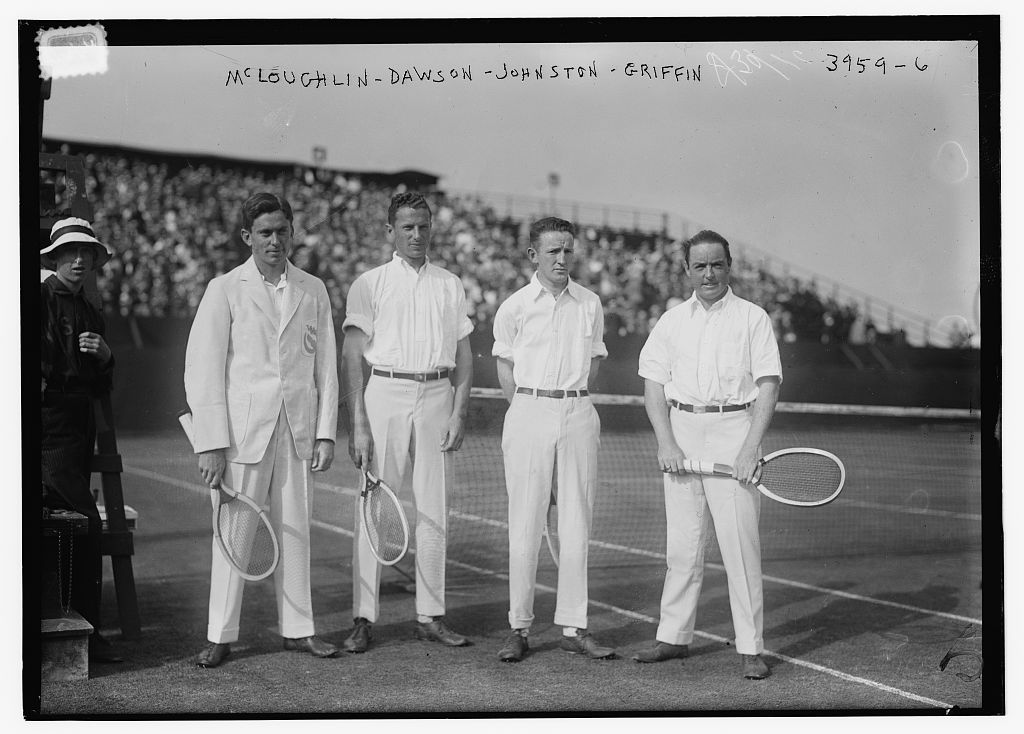
Maurice Evans McLoughlin, Henry Ward Dawson (1890–1963), William Johnston (1894–1946), Clarence Griffin (1888–1973) on August 30, 1916, at the national men's doubles championship.

Henry Ward Dawson Sr. (November 6, 1890 – 1963) was an American doubles tennis champion with Maurice E. McLoughlin. In 1916 they were the number two seeded American doubles team. That year, they won the Pacific coast double championship and the United States sectional double championship in Chicago, Illinois.

== Biography ==
He was born in Iowa on November 6, 1890, to John Dawson and Mabel Walker. He was raised in Los Angeles, attended the public school system, and then attended Stanford University. After graduation, he went to work for the Mexican Petroleum Company in Tampico, Mexico. He died in 1963.

== Grand Slam finals ==
=== Doubles (1 runner-ups) ===
Result	Year	Championship	Surface	Partner	Opponents	Score
Loss	1916	U.S. National Championships	Grass	(United States) Maurice E. McLoughlin	(United States) Clarence Griffin (United States) Bill Johnston	4–6, 3–6, 7–5, 3–6
