= Bill Johnston (tennis) =

American tennis player

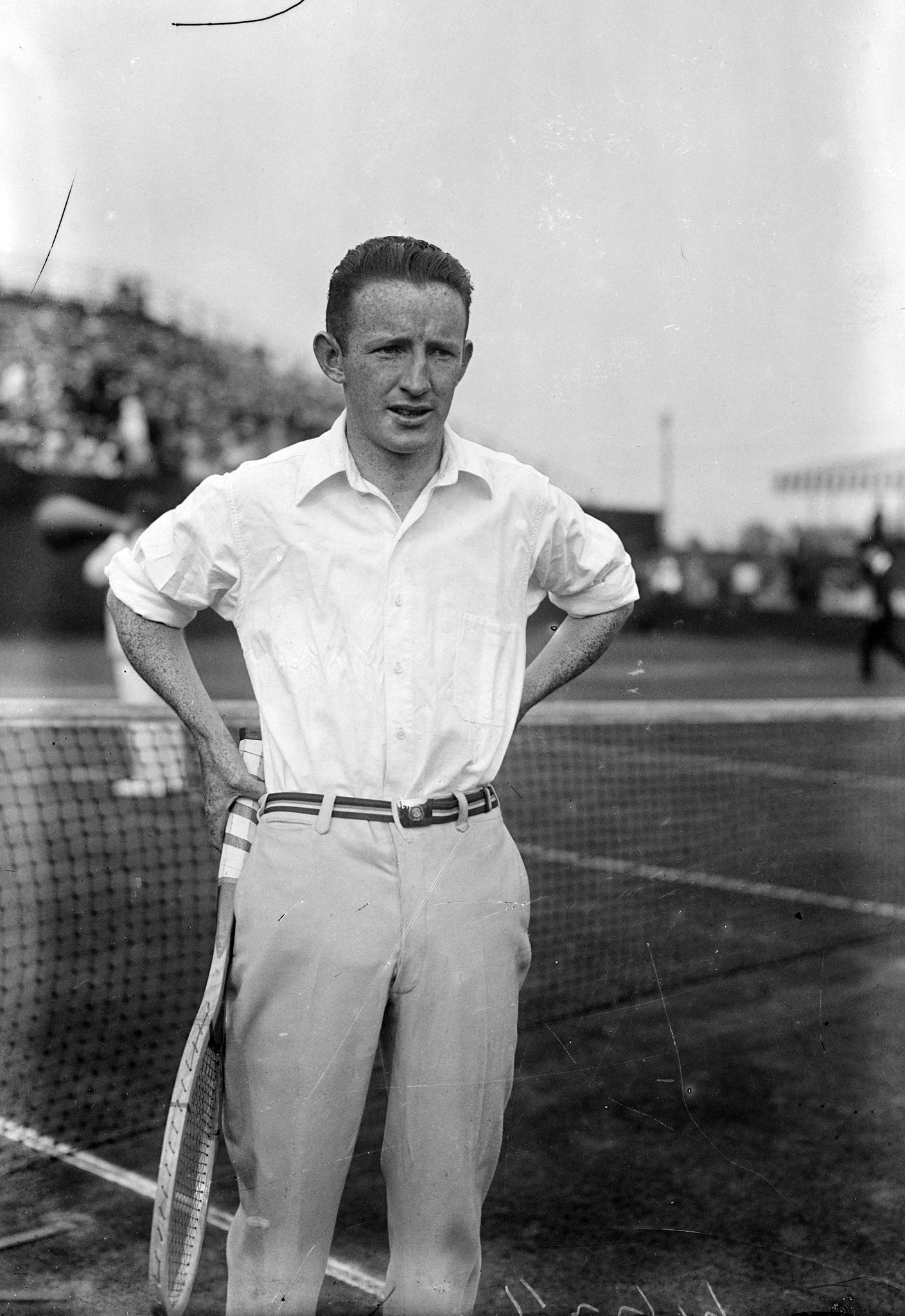
- Johnston in 1916 in his match against Richard "Dick" Norris Williams II
- Full name: William Marquitz Johnston
- Country (sports): United States
- Born: November 2, 1894 San Francisco, California, U.S.
- Died: May 1, 1946 (aged 51) San Francisco, California, U.S.
- Height: 1.73 m (5 ft 8 in)
- Turned pro: 1913 (amateur tour)
- Retired: 1928
- Plays: Right-handed (1-handed backhand)
- Int. Tennis HoF: 1958 (member page)

Singles
- Career record: 350–51 (87.3%)
- Career titles: 42
- Highest ranking: No. 1 (1919, A. Wallis Myers)

Grand Slam singles results
- Wimbledon: W (1923)
- US Open: W (1915, 1919)

Other tournaments
- WHCC: W (1923)

Grand Slam doubles results
- Wimbledon: SF (1921)
- US Open: W (1915, 1916, 1920)

Grand Slam mixed doubles results
- Wimbledon: 2R (1923)
- US Open: W (1921)

Team competitions
- Davis Cup: W (1920, 1921, 1922, 1923, 1924, 1925, 1926)

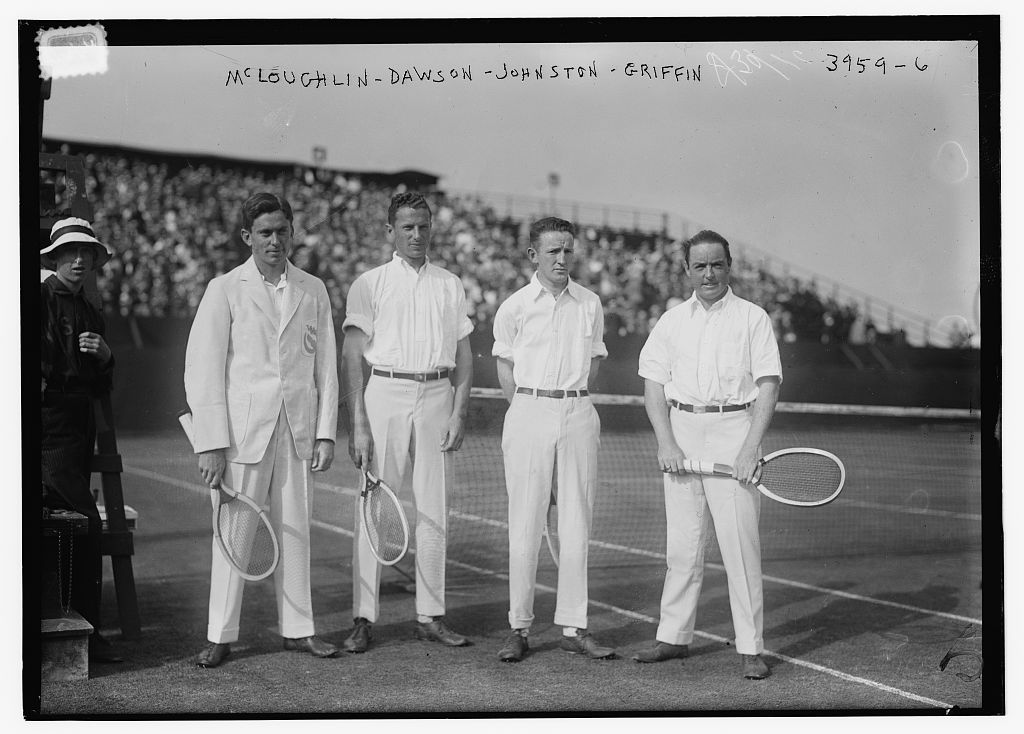
Maurice McLoughlin (1890-1957), Henry Ward Dawson (1890-1963), William Johnston (1894-1946), Clarence Griffin on (1888-1973) on August 30, 1916 at the national men's doubles championship.

William Marquitz "Little Bill" Johnston (November 2, 1894 – May 1, 1946) was an American world No. 1 tennis player.

== Biography ==
Bill Johnston was born November 2, 1894, in San Francisco, the son of Robert Johnston, an electrical plant mechanic and Margaret Burns, of Irish origin. Johnston started to play tennis in early 1906, aged 11, on the public asphalt courts in Golden Gate Park. After the 1906 San Francisco earthquake, the schools were closed, and he spent much of his spare time practicing on the tennis courts. He achieved his first tournament victory at the 1910 Bay Counties junior singles competition.

In 1916, Johnston won the Cincinnati Open (now Cincinnati Masters) after Clarence Griffin defaulted in the challenge round. Johnston won the Longwood Challenge Cup, played on the Longwood Courts at Chestnut Hill, Massachusetts in 1913, 1916, 1919, 1920 and 1921.

During World War I, Johnston served in the U.S. Navy.

Johnston was the co-World No. 1 player in 1919 and in 1922 respectively along with Gerald Patterson and Bill Tilden. He won the US Championships in 1915 and 1919 as well as the World Hard Court Championships (clay) and Wimbledon in 1923.

Until "Big Bill" Tilden began to defeat him regularly in 1920, Johnston had been the best American player for a number of years and was ranked No. 1 by the United States Lawn Tennis Association in 1915 and 1919. In July 1919, Johnston defeated Tilden in the final of the U.S. Clay Court Championships. A month later, Johnston beat Tilden in three straight sets in the final of the 1919 US Championships, then Tilden overtook him in 1920. Johnston remained competitive with Tilden for the next seven or eight years, but was never able to beat Tilden in an important match again. For instance, in 1922 Johnston defeated Tilden three times out of four occasions but Tilden beat Johnston in the final of the U.S. Championships in five sets. In 1923, despite Johnston winning both the World Hard Court Championships and Wimbledon, he failed to beat Tilden at the US Championships, losing in three one-sided sets. Johnston threatened to get closer to beating Tilden on the big stage in following years, but memorably lost the 1925 US Championships final in five sets to Tilden. Johnston was runner-up a record six times in the US Championships, and this is still a record today. Together Johnston and Tilden won seven consecutive Davis Cup trophies, from 1920 to 1926, a record that still stands. In September 1927, Johnston announced his retirement after the U.S. Davis Cup loss to the French team consisting of the 'Four Musketeers' and confirmed his decision in mid-1928. He turned down an offer to become professional.

Johnston was renowned for the power and deadliness of his forehand drive, which he hit shoulder-high with a Western grip.

After his tennis career, Johnston was active in the brokerage industry. He died of tuberculosis on May 1, 1946, at the age of 51.

== Legacy ==
Bill Johnston was inducted into the International Tennis Hall of Fame in 1958.

== Grand Slam finals ==
=== Singles: 9 (3 titles, 6 runners-up) ===
Result	Year	Championship	Surface	Opponent	Score
Win	1915	U.S. Championships	Grass	(United States) Maurice McLoughlin	1–6, 6–0, 7–5, 10–8
Loss	1916	U.S. Championships	Grass	(United States) R. Norris Williams	6–4, 4–6, 6–0, 2–6, 4–6
Win	1919	U.S. Championships	Grass	(United States) Bill Tilden	6–4, 6–4, 6–3
Loss	1920	U.S. Championships	Grass	(United States) Bill Tilden	1–6, 6–1, 5–7, 7–5, 3–6
Loss	1922	U.S. Championships	Grass	(United States) Bill Tilden	6–4, 6–3, 2–6, 3–6, 4–6
Win	1923	Wimbledon	Grass	(United States) Frank Hunter	6–0, 6–3, 6–1
Loss	1923	U.S. Championships	Grass	(United States) Bill Tilden	4–6, 1–6, 4–6
Loss	1924	U.S. Championships	Grass	(United States) Bill Tilden	1–6, 7–9, 2–6
Loss	1925	U.S. Championships	Grass	(United States) Bill Tilden	6–4, 9–11, 3–6, 6–4, 3–6

=== Doubles (3 titles) ===
Result	Year	Championship	Surface	Partner	Opponents	Score
Win	1915	U.S. Championships	Grass	(United States) Clarence Griffin	(United States) Maurice E. McLoughlin (United States) Tom Bundy	2–6, 6–3, 6–4, 3–6, 6–3
Win	1916	U.S. Championships	Grass	(United States) Clarence Griffin	(United States) Maurice E. McLoughlin (United States) Henry Ward Dawson	6–4, 6–3, 5–7, 6–3
Win	1920	U.S. Championships	Grass	(United States) Clarence Griffin	(United States) Roland Roberts (United States) Willis E. Davis	6–2, 6–2, 6–3

=== Mixed doubles (1 title) ===
Result	Year	Championship	Surface	Partner	Opponents	Score
Win	1921	U.S. Championships	Grass	(United States) Mary Browne	(United States) Molla Bjurstedt Mallory (United States) Bill Tilden	3–6, 6–4, 6–3

== World Championships finals ==
=== Singles (1 title) ===
Result	Year	Championship	Surface	Opponent	Score
Win	1923	World Hard Court Championships	Clay	(Belgium) Jean Washer	4–6, 6–2, 6–2, 4–6, 6–3

== Performance timeline ==
Key
W	F	SF	QF	#R	RR	Q#	DNQ	A	NH

(W) winner; (F) finalist; (SF) semifinalist; (QF) quarterfinalist; (#R) rounds 4, 3, 2, 1; (RR) round-robin stage; (Q#) qualification round; (DNQ) did not qualify; (A) absent; (NH) not held; (SR) strike rate (events won / competed); (W–L) win–loss record.

Events with a challenge round: (W_{C}) won; (CR) lost the challenge round; (F_{A}) all comers' finalist

(OF) only for French players

	1913	1914	1915	1916	1917	1918	1919	1920	1921	1922	1923	1924	1925	1926	1927	SR	W–L	Win %
Grand Slam tournaments																3 / 15	67–12	84.8
French	OF		not held					OF					A	A	A	0 / 0	0–0	–
Wimbledon	A	A	not held				A	2R	A	A	W	A	A	A	A	1 / 2	8–1	88.9
U.S.	3R	2R	W	F	A	A	W	F	4R	F	F	F	F	QF	SF	2 / 13	59–11	84.3
Australian	A	A	A	not held			A	A	A	A	A	A	A	A	A	0 / 0	0–0	–
Win–loss	2–1	1–1	7–0	6–1	0–0	0–0	7–0	7–2	3–1	5–1	12–1	6–1	5–1	2–1	4–1			
