= Willis E. Davis (tennis) =

American tennis player

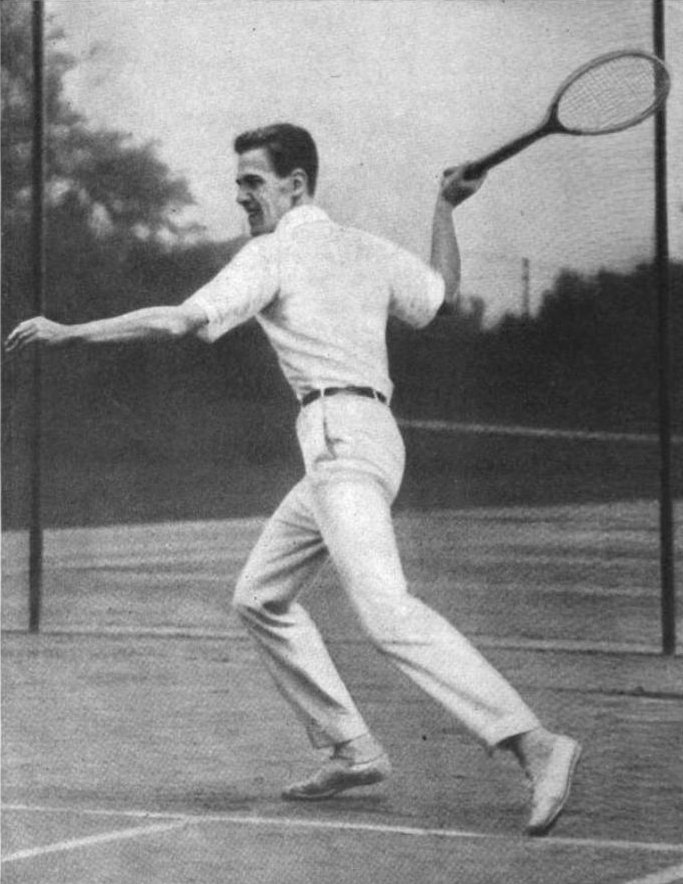
- Davis in 1916
- Full name: Willis Elphinstone Davis Jr.
- Country (sports): United States
- Born: 16 December 1893 San Francisco, California, United States
- Died: 15 December 1936 (aged 42) Fort Whipple, Arizona, United States
- Height: 5 ft 11 in (1.80 m)
- Retired: 1923
- College: University of California, Berkeley; University of Pennsylvania

Singles
- Highest ranking: No. 9 (1919, A. Wallis Myers)

Grand Slam singles results
- Wimbledon: 4R (1919)
- US Open: SF (1921)

Doubles

Grand Slam doubles results
- US Open: F (1920)

Grand Slam mixed doubles results
- US Open: W (1916)

Willis Elphinstone Davis Jr. (1893–1936) was an American tennis player who was active in the early 20th century.

== Career ==
Davis was born in San Francisco, the son of wealthy painter Willis E. Davis and his wife Elise "Elsie" Kohler Davis. Davis's first prominent tennis match was a doubles competition for the California state championship in 1913 in which he and Lin Murray were eliminated by Clarence Griffin and John Strachan. Davis was playing for the University of California, Berkeley, and won a 1914 match against Stanford University's intercollegiate champion Herbert Hahn. While at Berkeley he joined the secretive fraternity Omicron Delta which had just changed its name from Theta Nu Epsilon, a chapter of the Skull and Bones. He was also a member of Delta Kappa Epsilon.

Becoming known for his very high speed serve, Davis transferred to the University of Pennsylvania, Towne Scientific School for the 1914–15 school year. The New York Times profiled him as exemplary of the emerging California style of powerful "cannonball service" which Maurice E. McLoughlin had used to become national champion. Davis's explosive serve was observed to have an effective side-breaking spin applied with the top of the racket, a spin which put the opponent off balance. After his serve he usually rushed the net to counter sharply angled return shots. However, Davis was said to have a comparative weakness in his back court game, having put so much effort into perfecting his serve.

Davis won the mixed doubles title at the 1916 U.S. National Championships played at the Philadelphia Cricket Club. With Eleonora Sears, he defeated Florence Ballin and Bill Tilden in two sets 6–4, 7–5.

At the 1916 Cincinnati Open, he was a finalist in the All-Comers singles tournament (losing to Bill Johnston) and paired with Dean Mathey to reach the finals in men's doubles (where they lost to Johnston and Clarence Griffin).

Also in 1916, Davis won the Clay Court Championship, beating Conrad Doyle in the final in straight sets. In the 1916 Pennsylvania State Championship Davis scored a memorable victory over Bill Tilden in the semifinal, 3–6, 6–3, 13–11, and then claimed the title against Graig Biddle in the final.

In 1918, Davis joined the Aviation Section, U.S. Signal Corps as a pilot. He trained in Oakland, California, San Antonio and New York to fly and fight in World War I. As a lieutenant in the American Expeditionary Forces, he was sent to France with fellow players Griffin and Charles S. "Chuck" Garland to participate in a friendly tennis match against French and British soldier/players, but the match was rescheduled for earlier and the three missed it. After the war, Davis competed at Wimbledon in 1919.

A. Wallis Myers of The Daily Telegraph ranked Davis as World No. 9 in 1919.

In 1920, Davis reached the final of the men's doubles championship with Roland Roberts but were defeated by fellow Californians Clarence Griffin and Bill Johnston in three straight sets. He won the singles title at the Pacific Coast Championships (now SAP Open) in 1920 with a victory over Clarence Griffin in the final.

His best Grand Slam singles result came at the 1921 U.S. National Championships where he reached the semifinals and lost in straight sets to multiple champion Bill Tilden, though the first went to 10-8.

He won the 1921 invitation tennis tournament of the Meadow Club in both singles and doubles. In the singles finals, he defeated Vincent Richards in four sets, and in the doubles finals, he and Watson Washburn defeated brothers Howard and Robert Kinsey. Davis retired from professional competition in 1923.

== Grand Slam finals ==
=== Doubles (1 runner-up) ===
Result	Year	Championship	Surface	Partner	Opponents	Score
Loss	1920	U.S. National Championships	Grass	(United States) Roland Roberts	(United States) Clarence Griffin (United States) Bill Johnston	2–6, 2–6, 3–6

=== Mixed doubles (1 title) ===
Result	Year	Championship	Surface	Partner	Opponents	Score
Win	1916	US National Championships	Grass	(United States) Eleonora Sears	(United States) Florence Ballin (United States) Bill Tilden	6–4, 7–5
