= Jean Baptiste Adoue =

American politician

Jean Baptiste Adoue, Jr. (November 4, 1884 – November 17, 1956) was the mayor of Dallas, Texas from 1951 to 1953.

== Early career ==
He is born in Dallas County, Texas, as one of four children of Jean Baptiste Adoue, Sr. and Mittie Neosha "Simpson" Adoue. In 1906, he graduated in law from the University of Texas at Austin and returned to his home town to practice law for the following year before working with Adoue Sr. at the National Bank of Commerce (formerly known as Flippen, Adoue, and Lobit which changed when his father became president in 1892). He went on to marry Hester Ann Allen on October 12, 1909. They had two children. After his father's death by suicide in his home on June 24, 1924, Adoue succeeded him as president of the National Bank of Commerce.

After the death of his first wife, he married his second wife, Mary J. Wilson, on May 12, 1937. They had no children. From 1939 to 1947, Adoue was president of the Dallas Chamber of Commerce, which he financially strengthened, earning him the Linz Award for community service in 1943.

== Life as a mayor ==
In 1942, he served in the city council where he became well known and appreciated. He was re-elected in 1943 and 1945. In 1949, he ran for mayor but lost to Wallace H. Savage, though he received the most votes as an elected council member. By 1951, another mayor vote by the public brought him into office. During his term as a mayor which resulted in clashes between his office and a number of unions, he passed a public-works program with which the Love Field would be expanded. Adoue didn't run for a second term as his health was in decline.

When his term as mayor ended, he went back to his banker job where he worked until his death on November 17, 1956. He was buried at Crown Hill Memorial Mausoleum, Dallas, Texas.

== Feats ==
He was once on the list of top ten tennis players in Texas and was sitting on the board of director of the U.S. Lawn Tennis Association for thirty years. He was also a Member of American Arbitration Association, American Bar Association, Newcomen Society and Phi Delta Theta.

| Preceded by Wallace H. Savage | Mayors of Dallas; 1951–1953 | Succeeded by Robert L. Thornton |
