= Walter Wesbrook =

American tennis player and coach

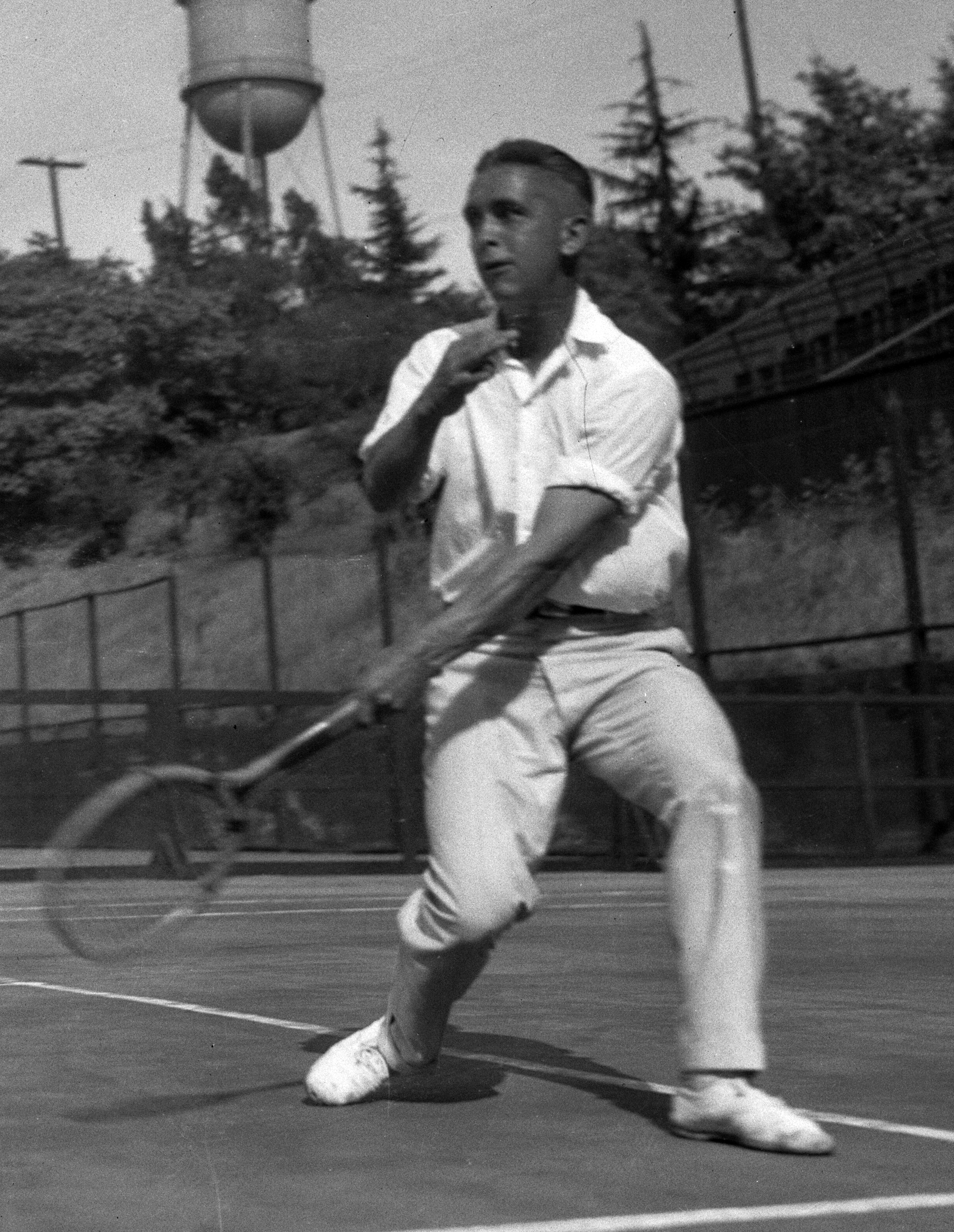
Wesbrook in 1925

Walter Kenneth Wesbrook (June 6, 1898, in Detroit, Michigan – January 22, 1991, in Los Angeles, California) was an American tennis player and coach.

In 1923, he reached the doubles final at the U.S. Clay Court championship with John Hennessey before falling to brothers Howard and Robert Kinsey of San Francisco, 6–4, 13–11, 6–3. Later that year, he won the Western Lawn Tennis Association championship over George Lott, 6–1, 9–7, 7–5.

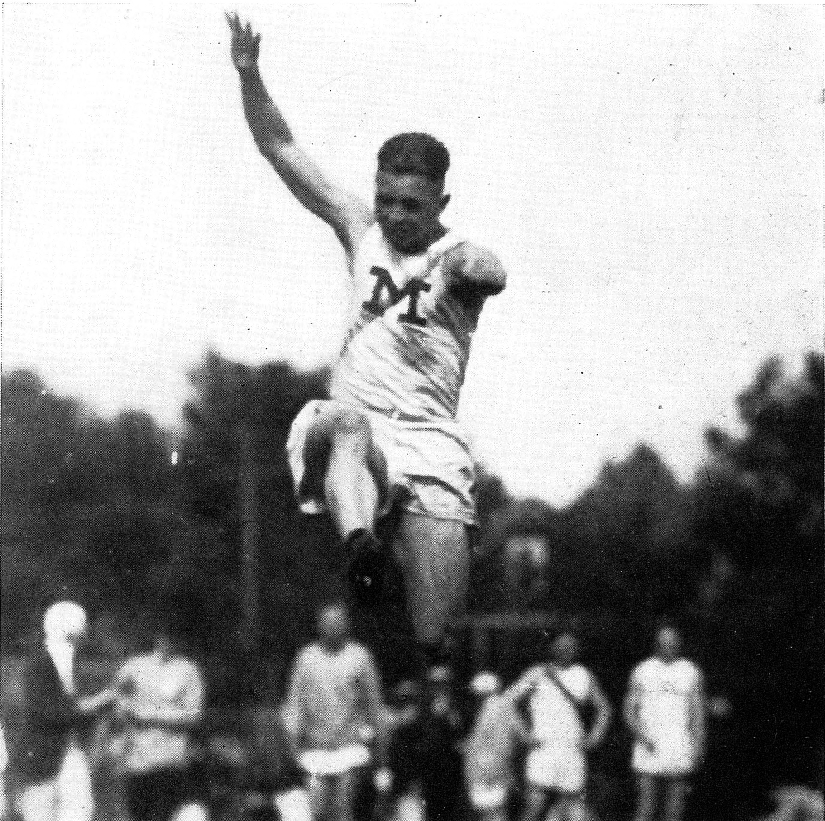
Wesbrook competing in the long jump, 1921

Wesbrook played and coached collegiate Tennis at the University of Michigan. As a player, he won the Big Ten singles titles in 1919 and 1920, and the Big Ten doubles title with Nicholas Bartz in 1919. He also competed in the pole vault and long jump for the Michigan Wolveriens track team. He could pole vault 12 feet and long jump 23 feet. By 1921, he was the tennis coach at Michigan, and went 8–3 in his one season there.

At the Cincinnati Masters tournament, Wesbrook reached the singles and doubles finals in 1920. He lost the singles title in four tough sets to Hennessey, and, with partner Kenneth Simmons, he lost the doubles final to the team of Hennessey and Fritz Bastian in five sets: 3–6, 4–6, 6–2, 7–5, 2–6.

After his playing career, Wesbrook moved to California and became a teacher and tennis coach at the Polytechnic School in Pasadena, California. He also competed in the Senior Olympics and holds numerous national track and field records for the 75–79 and 80–84 age groups. He was also the Tennis Professional at the famous Huntington Hotel in Pasadena. Walter was also known for his ability to memorize epic poetry including the Ancient Mariner.
