= Ludlow Van Deventer =

American tennis player (1892–1967)

- Country (sports): United States
- Born: November 20, 1892
- Died: August 7, 1967 (aged 74)

Grand Slam singles results
- US Open: 3R (1920)

Ludlow Van Deventer (November 20, 1892 – August 7, 1967) was an American tennis player.

The descendant of a Dutch colonist, Van Deventer grew up in Plainfield, New Jersey, and was a 1915 graduate of Princeton University. He served in France as a first lieutenant with the 308th Field Artillery in World War I.

Van Deventer was active in tennis during the 1910s and 1920s. He made the singles third round of the 1920 U.S. National Championships, was a singles finalist at the New York State Championships and with brother Philip was a two–time winner of the New Jersey Championships doubles event.

A stock broker by profession, Van Deventer served as president of an investment firm in Manhattan.
