= Lyle Mahan =

American tennis player

- Full name: Lyle Evans Mahan
- Country (sports): USA
- Born: 12 February 1881; New York, New York, United States
- Died: 15 May 1966 (Age 85); New York, New York, United States
- Retired: 1921

Singles
- Career titles: 1

Grand Slam singles results
- US Open: QF (1918)

Lyle Mahan (12 February 1881 – 15 May 1966) was an American tennis player in the early 20th century.

Mahan was born in 1881, the third child and only son of Alfred Thayer Mahan (1840–1914), a naval officer and historian, and Ellen Lyle Mahan (maiden name Evans) (1851–1927). Mahan was singles champion of Columbia University in 1902 and graduated from Columbia University that year. He reached the Challenge Round of the 1903 Pennsylvania championships, where he lost to William Clothier, in a match in which "Clothier was at no time pushed, and evidently feeling this, he never attempted to live up to his reputation." At the Nassau invitational event in Glen Cove in 1914, Mahan beat seven times US singles champion William Larned. In 1918, Mahan reached the quarter finals of the US championships, losing in four sets against Ichiya Kumagae. "If Lyle Mahan had stuck closer to the net, he would have given Kumagae a better run for his money", stated The Brooklyn Daily Times. Mahan was a successful attorney and financier.
