= Walter Merrill Hall =

American tennis player and administrator

- Born: December 4, 1887; Bridgeport, Connecticut, U.S.
- Died: July 28, 1980 (aged 92); New Rochelle, New York, U.S.
- Occupations: banking, broker, investment adviser, tennis administrator

Walter Merrill Hall (December 4, 1887 – July 28, 1980) was born in Bridgeport, Connecticut, and raised in Manhattan. Hall was a longtime player and administrator in American tennis. Career highlights: 1. Nationally ranked number four in 1918. 2. U.S. National Championship quarterfinalists in 1918 & 1919. 3. USLTA President 1934–36.

== Life ==
He was the only child of John Walter Hall (organist, vocal instructor) and Louise Hanford Merrill. He married Mary Story "Vandy" Cape in Manhattan on April 11, 1925. She was also a tennis player. During the 1924 dispute over refining amateurism, Hall declined to sign the players' protest petition and instead co-authored a separate letter. It was a volatile issue for most of the year. Hall served as president of the West Side Tennis Club, 1929–31. He was an administrator with the now-United States Tennis Association. Treasure: 1931–33. President: 1934–36. He then served the game in various capacities, including as chairman of the Davis Cup Committee. He worked in New York City as a banker, broker, and investment adviser. Hall died at the Bayberry Nursing Home in New Rochelle, New York, at age 92.

== Tennis ==
Hall was ranked in the U.S. Top Ten in 1911, 1915 and 1918. Hall was a singles quarterfinalist and finalist at the Tri-State tournament (Cincinnati Open) in 1910 and 1911. He won a doubles (with Harold Hackett) and two singles runner-ups in the Clay Court Championships between 1910 and 1913. He won three Middle States Championships (1911, 1918, and 1919). He reached the quarterfinals at the U.S. National Championships in 1918 and 1919. The first was a five-set close loss to Bill Tilden, 6–3, 1–6, 7–5, 5–7, 1–6. Hall was leading in the fourth set, 5–3. Tilden then won four straight games. Hall won the New Hampshire State Championships in singles at age 45 (1933).
