= Craig Biddle =

American tennis player

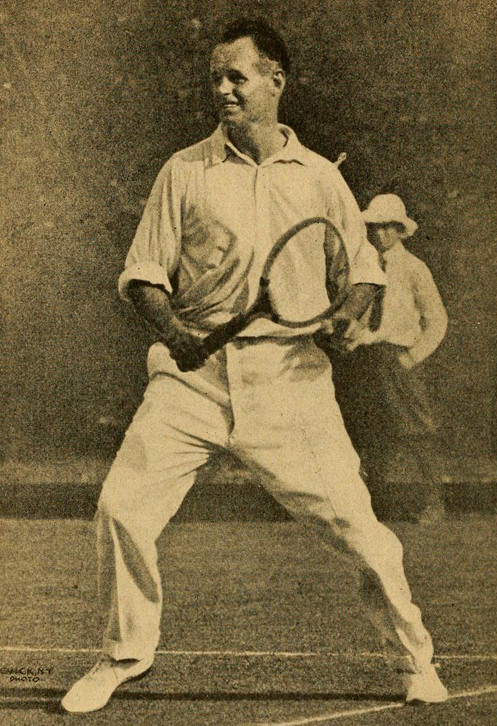
- Biddle in 1918
- Full name: Edward Craig Biddle
- Country (sports): United States
- Born: October 24, 1879 Philadelphia, Pennsylvania
- Died: December 22, 1947 (aged 68) Wakefield, Rhode Island
- Turned pro: 1902 (amateur)
- Retired: 1930

Singles

Grand Slam singles results
- French Open: 2R (1927)
- Wimbledon: 4R (1913)
- US Open: QF (1917, 1918, 1921)

Other tournaments
- WHCC: 2R (1913, 1914)

Mixed doubles

Grand Slam mixed doubles results
- US Open: F (1920)

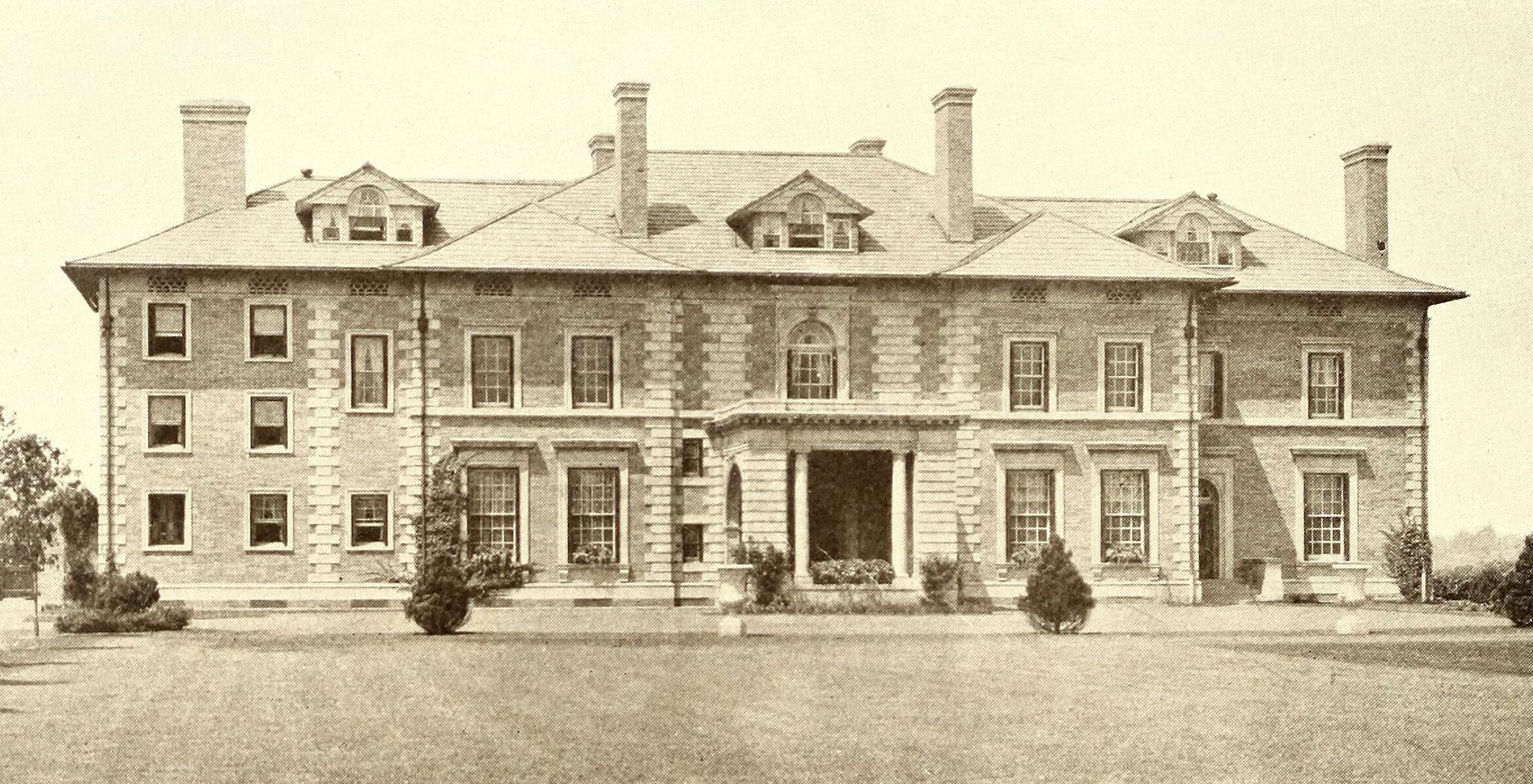
Biddle's "Laurento" estate, designed by Peabody & Stearns

Edward Craig Biddle (October 24, 1879 – December 22, 1947) was an American male tennis player who was active in the second decade of the 20th century.

== Biography ==
Craig was born into the Biddle family, a prominent Philadelphia family, the youngest son of Edward Biddle and Emma Drexel Biddle. His mother was the daughter of the wealthy Philadelphia financier Anthony Joseph Drexel (1826–1893). His elder brother was Anthony Joseph Drexel Biddle Sr. Biddle was educated in private schools and abroad. In 1901, after his 21st birthday, he inherited approximately $1 million from his maternal grandfather's estate (equivalent to $38,700,000 in 2025).

In 1901, he married Laura Whelen of Philadelphia. Until World War I, the couple traveled extensively in Europe, socializing with European nobility and royalty. It was during this time that he began playing tennis frequently.

Biddle and his wife had three children: Craig Jr., George Drexel Biddle, and Laura May Biddle (who married William Rhinelander Stewart Jr., sister of Anita of Braganza). He and his wife separated in 1917, and she died in 1925. He married a second time to Josephine Peet Wilmerding in 1926 but they divorced in 1945. His third marriage was to Alica Laura Savard, who had been his nurse, as he suffered from severe arthritis. Later in his life he lived at Rocky Brook Farm, Peace Dale, Rhode Island.

== Tennis career ==
In 1920, he reached the final of the mixed doubles competition at the U.S. National Championships (now US Open) together with Molla Bjurstedt Mallory. They lost the final to Hazel Hotchkiss Wightman and Wallace F. Johnson in straight sets. His best singles performance in a Grand Slam tournament was reaching the quarterfinal of the U.S. National Championships in 1917, 1918 and 1921.

In September 1913, Biddle reached the final of the Montreux Territet Autumn Meeting in Switzerland but was defeated by Anthony Wilding in three straight sets. In March 1920 he was runner-up at the Floria Tennis Championships, losing in the final in straight sets to Ichiya Kumagae.

== Grand Slam finals ==
=== Mixed doubles (1 runner-up) ===
Result	Year	Championship	Surface	Partner	Opponents	Score
Loss	1920	U.S. National Championships	Grass	(United States) Molla Bjurstedt Mallory	(United States) Hazel Hotchkiss Wightman (United States) Wallace F. Johnson	4–6, 3–6
