= Theodore Pell =

American tennis player

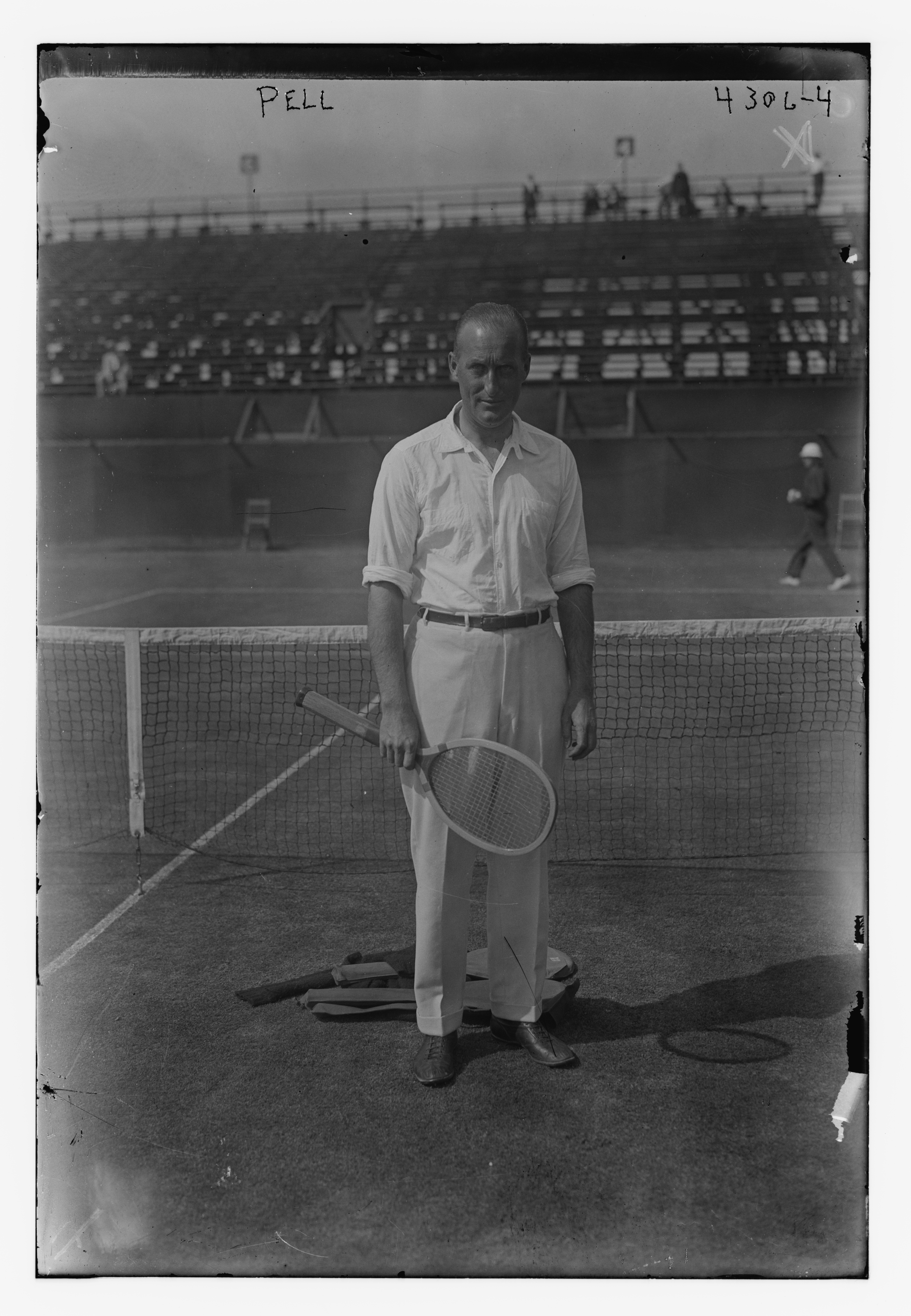
- Theodore Roosevelt Pell at the 1917 US Open
- Full name: Theodore Roosevelt Pell
- Country (sports): United States
- Born: May 12, 1878; New York, NY
- Died: August 18, 1967 (aged 88); Sands Point, New York
- Height: 1.83 m (6 ft 0 in)
- Plays: Right-handed (one-handed backhand)
- Int. Tennis HoF: 1966 (member page)

Singles
- Highest ranking: No. 5 (1913 U.S. ranking)

Grand Slam singles results
- US Open: SF (1915)

Other tournaments
- Olympic Games: 3R (1912)

Theodore Roosevelt Pell (May 12, 1878 – August 18, 1967) was an American tennis player who played in the 1912 Summer Olympics.

== Tennis career ==
Pell was the only U.S. participant in tennis events at the 1912 Summer Olympics. He played in the outdoor tournament and reached the third round, in which he was defeated by the German Ludwig Heyden.

His best performance at a Grand Slam tournament came in 1915 when he defeated Watson Washburn and Beals Wright to reach the semifinal of the U.S National Championships at Newport. In the semifinal he was beaten in straight sets by Maurice McLoughlin.

He won the singles title at the New England Championships from 1907 until 1910. Pell won the singles title at the U.S. National Indoor Tennis Championships in 1907, 1909, and 1911 and the doubles title in 1905, 1909, 1911 and 1912.

He was inducted into the International Tennis Hall of Fame in 1966.

== Personal ==
His godmother was Martha Roosevelt, mother of United States President Theodore Roosevelt, after whom he was named. Theodore Pell was also the second cousin to United States Senator Claiborne Pell of Rhode Island.
