= Clarence Griffin =

American tennis player

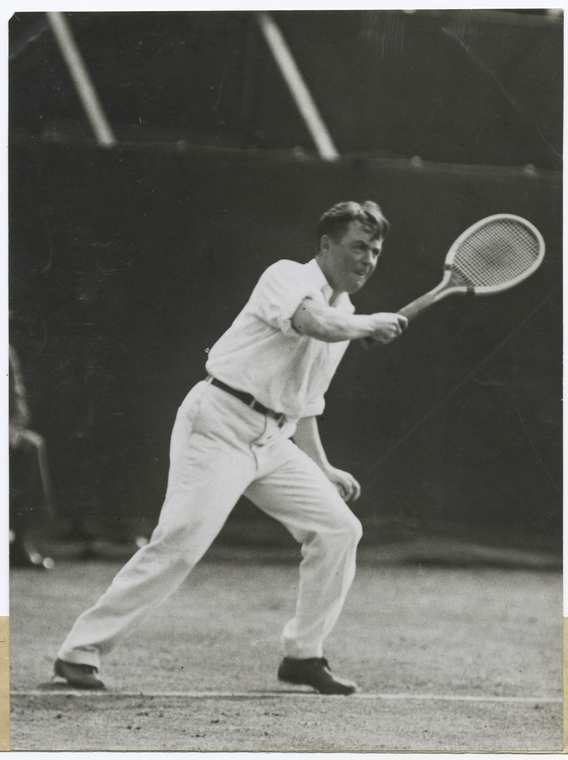
- Full name: Clarence James Griffin
- Country (sports): United States
- Born: January 19, 1888 San Francisco, California, United States
- Died: March 28, 1973 (aged 85)
- Height: 1.70 m (5 ft 7 in)
- Turned pro: 1906 (amateur tour)
- Retired: 1931
- Plays: Right-handed (1-handed backhand)
- Int. Tennis HoF: 1970 (member page)

Singles
- Highest ranking: No. 6 (1916 U.S. ranking)

Grand Slam singles results
- Wimbledon: 2R (1919)
- US Open: SF (1916)

Doubles

Grand Slam doubles results
- US Open: W (1915, 1916, 1920)
- Last updated on: December 12, 2012.

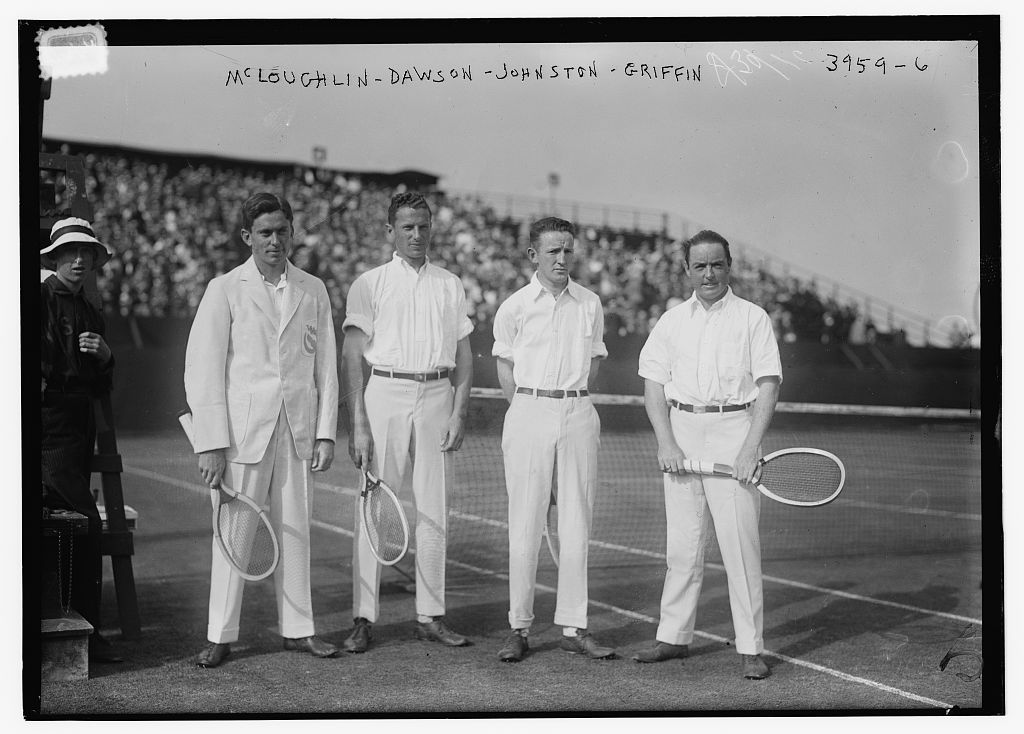
Maurice Evans McLoughlin (1890-1957), Henry Ward Dawson (1890-1963), William Marquitz Johnston (1894-1946), Clarence James Griffinon (1888-1973) on August 30, 1916 at the national men's doubles championship.

Clarence James "Peck" Griffin (January 19, 1888 – March 28, 1973) was an American tennis player. His best major performance in singles was reaching the semi-finals of the 1916 U.S. National Championships (where he beat Wallace F. Johnson before losing to R. Norris Williams). He also reached the quarter-finals in 1914, 1915, 1917 and 1920.

== Biography ==
He was born on January 19, 1888, in San Francisco, California.

Griffin ranked in singles in the U.S. Top Ten three times: he was No. 7 in 1915 and No. 6 in both 1916 and 1920. In addition to his singles success, Griffin also made a mark in doubles with fellow Californian Bill Johnston.

In 1913 he won the singles title at the Niagara International Tennis Tournament defeating Edward H. Whitney in four sets. He successfully defended his title in the challenge round in the following year, 1914, against George Church, also in four sets. He won the singles and doubles titles at the Cincinnati tournament in 1915 and was a doubles champion and singles finalist in Cincinnati in 1916. In 1915 he was victorious in the Tri-State Championship, disposing W.S. McElroy in the challenge round in three straight sets.

Griffin, and doubles partner Johnston, won the U.S. doubles title three times (1915, 1916, and 1920), and Griffin also reached the 1913 doubles final with John Strachan. He and Strachan won the U.S. Clay Court title that year, and in 1914 Griffin reached his singles final in a comeback beating of Elia Fottrell, 3–6, 6–8, 8–6, 6–0, 6–2, for the Clay Court singles crown (held that year in Cincinnati).

In 1929, he married Mildred Talbot De Camp, daughter of T. James Talbot of Los Angeles.

He died on March 28, 1973.

== Legacy ==
He was a 5-foot-7 right-handed player and entered the International Tennis Hall of Fame in 1970. His nephew was entertainer Merv Griffin.

== Grand Slam finals ==
=== Doubles (3 titles, 1 runner-up) ===
Result	Year	Championship	Surface	Partner	Opponents	Score
Loss	1913	U.S. Championships	Grass	(United States) John Strachan	(United States) Maurice E. McLoughlin (United States) Tom Bundy	4–6, 5–7, 1–6
Win	1915	U.S. Championships	Grass	(United States) Bill Johnston	(United States) Maurice E. McLoughlin (United States) Tom Bundy	2–6, 6–3, 6–4, 3–6, 6–3
Win	1916	U.S. Championships	Grass	(United States) Bill Johnston	(United States) Maurice E. McLoughlin (United States) Ward Dawson	6–4, 6–3, 5–7, 6–3
Win	1920	U.S. Championships	Grass	(United States) Bill Johnston	(United States) Roland Roberts (United States) Willis E. Davis	6–2, 6–2, 6–3
