= Watson Washburn =

American tennis player

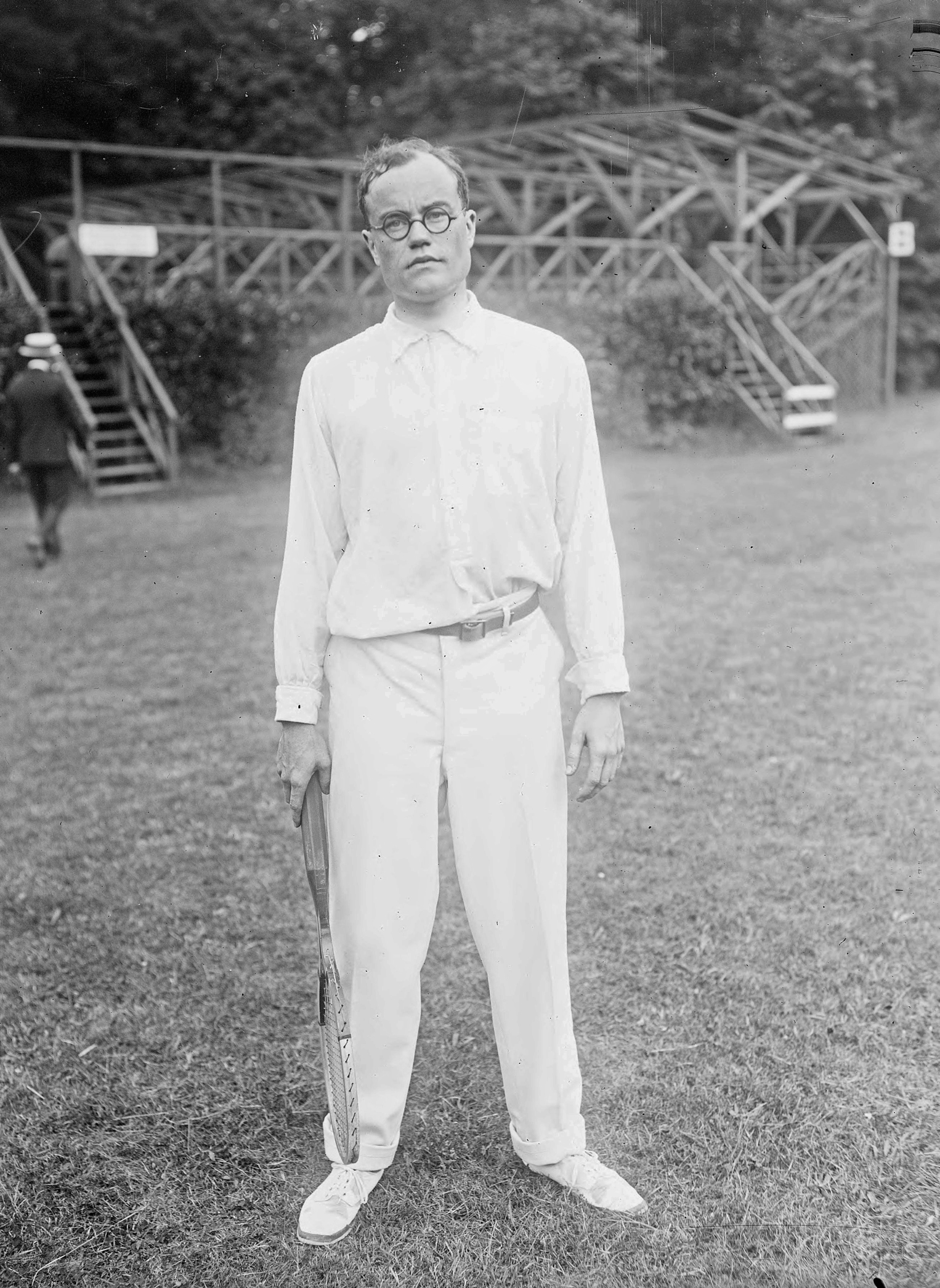
- Full name: Watson McLean Washburn
- Country (sports): United States
- Born: June 13, 1894 New York City, New York, United States
- Died: December 2, 1973 (aged 79) New York City, New York, United States
- Turned pro: 1910 (amateur tour
- Retired: 1937
- Plays: Right-handed (one-handed backhand)
- College: Harvard College; Columbia Law School
- Int. Tennis HoF: 1965 (member page)

Singles
- Highest ranking: No. 5 (U.S. ranking)

Grand Slam singles results
- Wimbledon: QF (1924)
- US Open: QF (1911, 1912, 1913, 1916, 1920)

Doubles

Grand Slam doubles results
- Wimbledon: F (1924)
- US Open: F (1921, 1923)

Other doubles tournaments

Team competitions
- Davis Cup: W (1921)

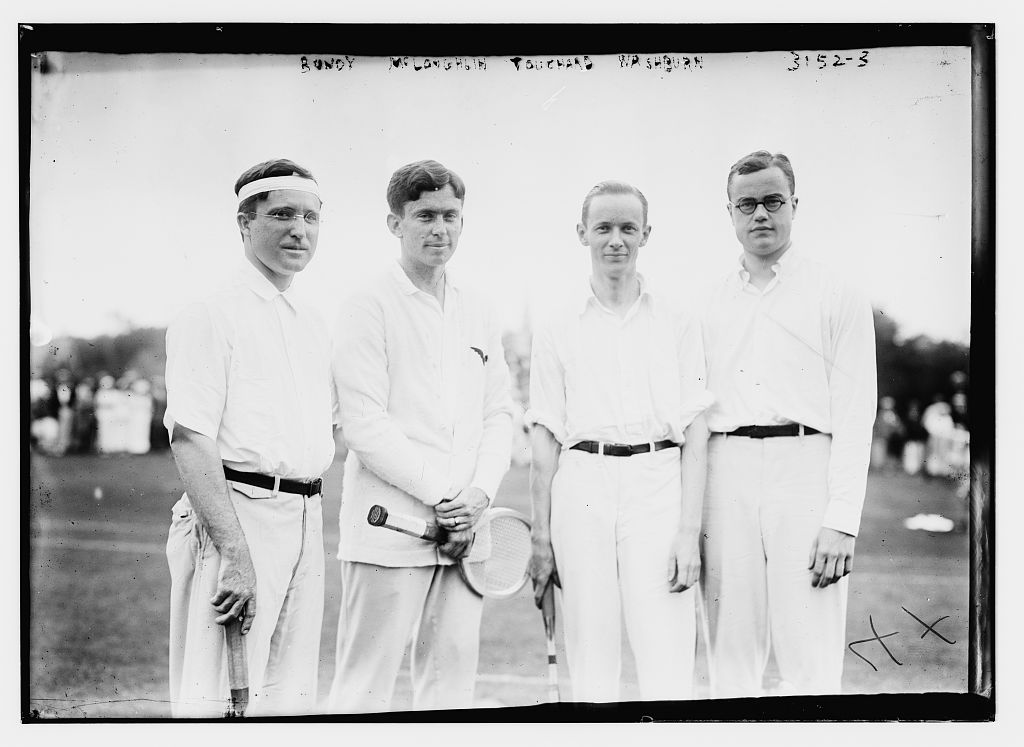
Thomas Bundy, Maurice Evans McLoughlin, Gustave F. Touchard and Watson Washburn circa 1914-1915

Watson McLean Washburn (June 13, 1894 – December 2, 1973) was an American tennis player who was in the top 10 in the US seven times between 1914 and 1922. He was also one of the founders of the International Tennis Hall of Fame, to which he was inducted in 1965. He also competed at the 1924 Summer Olympics.

== Biography ==
He was born in Manhattan on June 13, 1894.

He was primarily a doubles player and teamed with Richard Norris Williams to take the Davis Cup in 1921. Also with Williams, he reached two US Championship finals and one at Wimbledon. He won the US Intercollegiate Doubles Championship in 1913 and the Indoor Doubles Championship in 1915. In July 1915, Washburn and Williams won the doubles title at the Eastern Tennis Championship in Brookline defeating Irving C. Wright and Wallace F. Johnson in four sets.

In 1917, Washburn joined the American Expeditionary Forces and served during World War I in France as a captain in the artillery.

In 1921, Washburn defeated Richard Norris Williams in the final of the Newport Casino Invitational in five sets.

After his tennis career, he became an assistant state prosecutor.

== Grand Slam finals ==
=== Doubles (3 runners-up) ===
| Result | Year | Championship | Surface | Partner | Opponents | Score |
|---|---|---|---|---|---|---|
| Loss | 1921 | U.S. National Championships | Grass | (United States) Richard Norris Williams | (United States) Vincent Richards (United States) Bill Tilden | 11–13, 10–12, 1–6 |
| Loss | 1923 | U.S. National Championships | Grass | (United States) Richard Norris Williams | (South Africa) Brian Norton (United States) Bill Tilden | 6–3, 2–6, 3–6, 7–5, 2–6 |
| Loss | 1924 | Wimbledon | Grass | (United States) Richard Norris Williams | (United States) Frank Hunter (United States) Vincent Richards | 3–6, 6–3, 10–8, 6–8, 3–6 |
