= 1921 U.S. National Championships – Men's singles =

Men's singles
- 1921 U.S. National Championships

Final
- Champion: (United States) Bill Tilden
- Runner-up: (United States) Wallace Johnson
- Score: 6–1, 6–3, 6–1

Details
- Draw: 108
- Seeds: N.A.

Events
Singles	men	women
Doubles	men	women
- U.S. National Championships

Defending champion Bill Tilden defeated Wallace Johnson in the final, 6–1, 6–3, 6–1, to win the men's singles tennis title at the 1921 U.S. National Championships. It was Tilden's second U.S. Championships singles title and fourth major singles title overall. Tilden became the first male tennis player to win four consecutive major singles events.

The tournament began on September 9, weeks after the conclusion of the corresponding Women's singles event, and ended on September 19. For the first time, the men's tournament was held at the Germantown Cricket Club in Philadelphia instead of at Forest Hills.

== Draw ==
Key

- Q = Qualifier
- WC = Wild card
- LL = Lucky loser
- Alt = Alternate
- ITF = ITF entry
- PR = Protected ranking
- SR = Special ranking
- SE = Special exempt
- JE = Junior exempt
- JR = Junior Accelerator Programme entrant
- CO = College Accelerator Programme entrant
- NG = Next Gen Accelerator Program entrant
- w/o = Walkover
- r = Retired
- d = Defaulted

=== Final eight ===
Quarterfinals
(United States) Craig Biddle	0	3	4
(United States) Wallace Johnson	6	6	6
(United States) Frank Hunter	1	3	4
(Australia) James Anderson	6	6	6
(United Kingdom) Gordon Lowe	4	3	4
(United States) Bill Tilden	6	6	6
(United States) Willis Davis	6	4	6	1	6
(United States) Robert Kinsey	3	6	4	6	4

Semifinals
(United States) Wallace Johnson	6	3	8	6
(Australia) James Anderson	4	6	6	3
(United States) Bill Tilden	10	6	6
(United States) Willis Davis	8	2	1

Finals
(United States) Wallace Johnson	1	3	1
(United States) Bill Tilden	6	6	6

=== Earlier rounds ===
==== Section 1 ====
First round

Second round
(United States) Parker	6	6	6
(United States) Robinson	4	4	2
(United States) Biddle	6	6	6
(United States) Gilmore	2	1	1
(United States) Crawford	10	6	6
(United States) Pannock	8	3	4
(United States) Hammett	6	6	6
(United States) Golden	4	2	2

Third round
(United States) Parker	6	4	1	3
(United States) Biddle	4	6	6	6
(United States) Crawford	3	6	2	4
(United States) Hammett	6	3	6	6

Fourth round
(United States) Biddle	6	3	6	6
(United States) Hammett	1	6	4	1

==== Section 2 ====
First round
(United States) Kinsey	6	6	6
(United States) Putnam	1	3	4
(United States) Oelsner	4	6	9	6
(United States) Stockton	6	4	7	0
(United States) Edwards	6	7	5	6	6
(United States) Vanneman	3	9	7	3	1
(United Kingdom) Myers	2	6	6	3	8
(United States) Gibbons	6	0	1	6	7^{r}
(United States) Washburn	6	6	6
(United States) Thayer	0	2	2
(United States) Johnson	6	6	6
(United States) Mercur	1	3	4

Second round
(United States) Knight	6	6	6
(United States) Hathaway	4	2	1
(United States) Kinsey	6	6	6
(United States) Oelsner	2	4	4
(United States) Edwards	4	6	6	4	6
(United Kingdom) Myers	6	4	4	6	4
(United States) Washburn	3	7	6	3	3
(United States) Johnson	6	5	2	6	6

Third round
(United States) Knight	2	3	8
(United States) Kinsey	6	6	10
(United States) Edwards	0	1	2
(United States) Johnson	6	6	6

Fourth round
(United States) Kinsey	6	6	2	1
(United States) Johnson	4	8	6	6

==== Section 3 ====
First round
(United States) Dionne	7	7	10
(United States) Evans	5	5	8
(United States) Fischer
(Japan) Kashio	w/	o
(United States) Hunter	6	5	6	3	6
(United States) Anderson	3	7	3	6	3
(United States) Bernstein
(United States) Larned	w/	o
(United States) Baggs
(United States) Garland	w/	o
(United States) King	6	6	6
(United States) Ewing	3	1	4
(United States) Jones	6	6	6
(United States) Sweet	0	1	1
(United States) Anderson	6	6	6
(United States) Baggs	2	2	1

Second round
(United States) Dionne	3	1	1
(United States) Fischer	6	6	6
(United States) Hunter	6	6	6
(United States) Bernstein	2	3	3
(United States) Baggs	1	2	0
(United States) King	6	6	6
(United States) Jones	2	2	1
(United States) Anderson	6	6	6

Third round
(United States) Fischer	6	6	4	3	0
(United States) Hunter	4	1	6	6	6
(United States) King	2	3	10
(United States) Anderson	6	6	12

Fourth round
(United States) Hunter	6	6	6
(United States) Anderson	3	3	1

==== Section 4 ====
First round
(United States) Adoue	6	6	8
(United States) Wood	1	3	6
(United States) Voshell
(Japan) Kumagae	w/	o
(United States) Ingraham	6	6	6
(Australia) Peach	3	1	4
(United States) Williams	6	6	6
(United States) Thayer	0	2	1
(United States) LeRoy	6	6	6
(Mexico) De La Borbolla	4	2	3
(Australia) Hawkes	6	6	6
(United States) Rosenbaum	2	3	3
(United States) Symington
(United States) Caner	w/	o
(Australia) Anderson	1	6	6	6
(United States) Rice	6	2	3	3

Second round
(United States) Adoue	6	2	6	6
(United States) Voshell	2	6	4	4
(United States) Ingraham	1	5	2
(United States) Williams	6	7	6
(United States) LeRoy	1	2	3
(Australia) Hawkes	6	6	6
(United States) Symington	1	0	5
(Australia) Anderson	6	6	7

Third round
(United States) Adoue	5	3	3
(United States) Williams	7	6	6
(Australia) Hawkes	8	0	3
(Australia) Anderson	10	6	6

Fourth round
(United States) Williams	3	3	6	6	4
(Australia) Anderson	6	6	2	4	6

==== Section 5 ====
First round
(United States) Tallant
(United States) Murray	w/	o
(United States) Mathey
(United States) Chapin	w/	o
(United States) Morgan	6	6	4	6
(United States) Kamber	4	2	6	2
(United Kingdom) Lowe
(United States) Werner	w/	o
(United States) Banks
(United States) Edralin	w/	o
(United States) Dudley
(United States) Garcia	w/	o
(United States) Pearson	6	6	6
(United States) Davis	3	2	4
(United States) Niles	6	6	6
(United States) Miller	1	0	2

Second round
(United States) Tallant	w/	o
(United States) Mathey
(United States) Morgan	2	2	2
(United Kingdom) Lowe	6	6	6
(United States) Banks	6	6	9	6
(United States) Dudley	3	3	11	2
(United States) Pearson	5	3	6	6	6
(United States) Niles	7	6	3	4	3

Third round
(United States) Mathey	w/	o
(United Kingdom) Lowe
(United States) Banks	3	3	4
(United States) Pearson	6	6	6

Fourth round
(United Kingdom) Lowe	6	6	6
(United States) Pearson	2	3	3

==== Section 6 ====
First round
(United States) Johnston	6	6	6
(United States) Kelleher	4	4	4
(United States) Hall	2	3	7	8	7
(United States) Ackerland	6	6	5	6	5
(United States) Hayes	6	6	6
(United States) Richards	1	1	0
(United States) Richards	6	6	3	6
(United States) Herndon	1	1	6	4
(United States) Allen	6	7	6
(United States) Hennessey	2	5	1
(Japan) Shimizu	6	6	6
(United States) Nielsen	1	1	1
(United States) Tilden	6	6	6
(United States) Wright	0	0	1
(United States) Goldsborough	6	7	6
(United States) Goldman	2	5	2

Second round
(United States) Johnston	6	6	6
(United States) Hall	4	1	4
(United States) Hayes	3	4	4
(United States) Richards	6	6	6
(United States) Allen	3	0	10
(Japan) Shimizu	6	6	12
(United States) Tilden	6	6	6
(United States) Goldsborough	2	1	4

Third round
(United States) Johnston	2	3	6	9	6
(United States) Richards	6	6	3	7	2
(Japan) Shimizu	4	4	1
(United States) Tilden	6	6	6

Fourth round
(United States) Johnston	6	5	4	3
(United States) Tilden	4	7	6	6

==== Section 7 ====
First round
(United States) Magee	4	6	2	7	8
(United States) Gore	6	0	6	5	6
(United States) Neer	6	6	9
(United States) Tremaine	2	1	7
(Australia) Todd	6	6	6
(United States) Groesbeck	1	1	0
(United States) Davis
(United States) Ingersoll	w/	o
(United States) Emerson	6	6	5	6
(United States) Osborne	3	4	7	1
(United States) de Turenne	6	6	10
(United States) Bruneau	0	4	8

Second round
(United States) Magee	2	8	2
(United States) Neer	6	10	6
(Australia) Todd	6	6	4	3	3
(United States) Davis	4	3	6	6	6
(United States) Emerson	6	6	6	6
(United States) de Turenne	3	8	4	4
(United States) Clothier	6	6	6
(United States) Taylor	1	0	2

Third round
(United States) Neer	3	4	6	4
(United States) Davis	6	6	2	6
(United States) Emerson	1	4	1
(United States) Clothier	6	6	6

Fourth round
(United States) Davis	9	5	14	6
(United States) Clothier	7	7	12	3

==== Section 8 ====
First round

Second round
(United States) Rogers	6	6	6
(United States) Martin	1	4	2
(United States) Gallon	6	6	6
(United States) Neely	3	1	2
(United States) Kinsey	6	6	6
(United States) Watson	3	2	2
(United States) Fall	7	6	6
(United States) Wilson	5	1	2

Third round
(United States) Rogers	4	6	2	12	2
(United States) Gallon	6	2	6	10	6
(United States) Kinsey	6	6	6
(United States) Fall	0	0	3

Fourth round
(United States) Gallon	0	1	4
(United States) Kinsey	6	6	6

Preceded by 1921 Wimbledon Championships	Grand Slams; Men's Singles	Succeeded by 1922 Australasian Championships
