= 1922 U.S. National Championships – Men's singles =

Men's singles
- 1922 U.S. National Championships

Final
- Champion: (United States) Bill Tilden
- Runner-up: (United States) Bill Johnston
- Score: 4–6, 3–6, 6–2, 6–3, 6–4

Details
- Draw: 124
- Seeds: N.A.

Events
Singles	men	women
Doubles	men	women
- U.S. National Championships

Two-time defending champion Bill Tilden defeated Bill Johnston in the final, 4–6, 3–6, 6–2, 6–3, 6–4 to win the men's singles tennis title at the 1922 U.S. National Championships. It was Tilden's third U.S. Championships singles title and fifth major singles title overall.

== Draw ==
Key

- Q = Qualifier
- WC = Wild card
- LL = Lucky loser
- Alt = Alternate
- ITF = ITF entry
- PR = Protected ranking
- SR = Special ranking
- SE = Special exempt
- JE = Junior exempt
- JR = Junior Accelerator Programme entrant
- CO = College Accelerator Programme entrant
- NG = Next Gen Accelerator Program entrant
- w/o = Walkover
- r = Retired
- d = Defaulted

=== Final eight ===
Quarterfinals
(United States) Bill Johnston	6	6	7
(Spain) Manuel Alonso	0	2	5
(United States) Vincent Richards	6	6	7
(Australia) James Anderson	4	2	5
(United States) Bill Tilden	6	6	6
(Japan) Zenzo Shimizu	2	3	1
(United States) R. Norris Williams	3	3	4
(Australia) Gerald Patterson	6	6	6

Semifinals
(United States) Bill Johnston	8	6	6
(United States) Vincent Richards	6	2	1
(United States) Bill Tilden	4	6	6	6
(Australia) Gerald Patterson	6	4	3	1

Final
(United States) Bill Johnston	6	6	2	3	4
(United States) Bill Tilden	4	3	6	6	6

=== Earlier rounds ===
==== Section 1 ====
First round
(United States) Beekman	6	6	6
(United States) Rogers	0	0	1
(United States) Pearson	6	6	6
(United States) Cravis	2	1	1
(United States) Kinsey	6	6	6
(United States) Reed	2	4	1
(United States) Bagby	6	0	4	6	6
(United States) Iler	1	6	6	4	0
(United States) Clothier	6	6	6
(United States) Lane	0	0	0
(Spain) Alonso	3	3	6	7	7
(United States) Anderson	6	6	1	5	5

Second round
(United States) Johnston	6	6	6
(United States) Biddle	3	1	4
(United States) Beekman	5	4	1
(United States) Pearson	7	6	6
(United States) Kinsey	6	6	10
(United States) Bagby	1	2	8
(United States) Clothier	6	6	4	3	6
(Spain) Alonso	1	0	6	6	4

Third round
(United States) Johnston	9	6	6
(United States) Pearson	7	1	2
(United States) Kinsey	2	8	6	6	6
(United States) Clothier	6	10	4	4	1

Fourth round
(United States) Johnston	4	6	6
(United States) Kinsey	6	2	2	rtd.

==== Section 2 ====
First round
(United States) Washburn	6	6	6
(United States) Baggs	1	1	2
(United States) Chapin	6	6	6
(United States) Bache	3	1	4
(United States) Charest	6	6	6
(United States) Colburn	3	2	2
(United States) Campbell	6	6	6
(United States) Lewin	3	4	3
(United States) Voshell	6	6	6
(United States) Casey	1	3	4
(United States) Knight	6	6	6
(United States) de Lone	1	1	2
(United States) LeRoy	6	6	6
(United States) Marion	1	2	1
(Spain) Alonso	6	6	6
(United States) Gilmore	1	1	1

Second round
(United States) Washburn	6	6	6
(United States) Chapin	1	4	2
(United States) Charest	8	6	6
(United States) Campbell	6	2	1
(United States) Voshell	6	6	6
(United States) Knight	0	3	1
(United States) LeRoy	3	3	0
(Spain) Alonso	6	6	6

Third round
(United States) Washburn	4	9	6	6
(United States) Charest	6	7	0	4
(United States) Voshell	2	1	3
(Spain) Alonso	6	6	6

Fourth round
(United States) Washburn	4	6	9	6	4
(Spain) Alonso	6	3	7	8	6

==== Section 3 ====
First round
(United States) Richards	6	6	6
(United States) Mangan	3	3	2
(United States) Garland	6	6	6
(United States) Magee	3	1	4
(United States) Gallon
(United States) Lockhorn	w/	o
(United States) Fischer
(United States) Hennessey	w/	o
(United States) Anderson	8	7	8
(United States) Bassford	6	5	6
(United States) Herndon	7	6	7
(United States) Fall	5	2	5
(United States) Bowman	6	9	6
(United States) Hall	1	7	3
(United States) Leonards
(Australia) Wertheim	w/	o

Second round
(United States) Richards	6	6	7
(United States) Garland	1	2	5
(United States) Gallon	1	4	6	2
(United States) Fischer	6	6	2	6
(United States) Anderson	4	6	3	9	6
(United States) Herndon	6	1	6	7	1
(United States) Bowman	6	6	10
(United States) Leonards	2	2	8

Third round
(United States) Richards	6	6	6
(United States) Fischer	2	4	1
(United States) Anderson	6	3	5	6	6
(United States) Bowman	3	6	7	2	8

Fourth round
(United States) Richards	6	6	6
(United States) Bowman	2	3	3

==== Section 4 ====
First round
(United States) .Kinsey	6	6	6
(United States) Biltchik	0	2	2
(United States) Edwards	8	7	7	9
(United States) Graves	6	5	9	7
(United States) Osborne	6	6	6
(United States) Dudley	3	4	2
(United States) Bramall	6	6	8	6
(United States) Oelsner	4	2	10	3
(United States) Williams	6	6	6
(United States) Norton	0	1	1
(United States) Nielsen	2	9	4	6	8
(United States) Stockton	6	7	6	3	6
(United States) Reid	3	7	3	6	6
(United States) Bruneau	6	5	6	4	1
(Australia) Anderson	6	3	6	6
(United States) Thayer	3	6	2	4

Second round
(United States) Kinsey	6	6	6
(United States) Edwards	2	2	1
(United States) Osborne	6	6	3	8
(United States) Bramall	1	3	6	6
(United States) Williams	6	6	6
(United States) Nielsen	2	1	1
(United States) Reid	4	7	7
(Australia) Anderson	6	9	9

Third round
(United States) Kinsey	6	6	6
(United States) Osborne	2	1	2
(United States) Williams	4	2	4
(Australia) Anderson	6	6	6

Fourth round
(United States) Kinsey	3	3	6	1
(Australia) Anderson	6	6	2	6

==== Section 5 ====
First round
(United States) Tilden	6	6	6
(United States) Thayer	0	2	2
(United States) King	6	6	6
(United States) Stoddart	0	1	3
(United States) Tremaine	6	7	6
(United States) Hodge	1	5	0
(United States) Richards	6	11	2	8
(United States) Hayday	0	9	6	6
(United States) Davis	2	6	2	6	6
(United States) Niles	6	3	6	3	4
(United States) Tremaine	6	6	6
(United States) Dionne	2	4	4
(United States) Vernon	7	6	6
(United States) Vanneman	5	3	4
(Australia) O'Hara Wood	6	6	6
(United States) Mathis	3	4	1

Second round
(United States) Tilden	6	6	6
(United States) King	3	3	4
(United States) Tremaine	10	6	6
(United States) Richards	8	1	0
(United States) Davis	8	6	6
(United States) Tremaine	6	2	3
(United States) Vernon	3	2	1
(Australia) O'Hara Wood	6	6	6

Third round
(United States) Tilden	6	6	6
(United States) Tremaine	2	0	1
(United States) Davis	2	4	4
(Australia) O'Hara Wood	6	6	6

Fourth round
(United States) Tilden	6	6	6
(Australia) O'Hara Wood	2	3	2

==== Section 6 ====
First round
(United States) Johnson	6	6	6
(United States) Hathaway	1	0	2
(United States) Watson	7	6	6	9
(United States) Wilson	5	4	8	7
(United States) Morgan	6	7	6
(United States) Merritt	2	5	1
(United States) de Turenne	5	6	6	7
(United States) Evans	7	3	4	5
(United States) Wear
(United States) Mathey	w/	o
(United States) Newell	6	6	12
(United States) Elliott	3	4	10
(United States) Dornheim	6	6	6
(United States) Rosenbaum	1	3	2
(Japan) Shimizu	6	7	6
(United States) Wesbrook	4	5	3

Second round
(United States) Johnson	6	6	6
(United States) Watson	0	4	1
(United States) Morgan	2	2	4
(United States) de Turenne	6	6	6
(United States) Wear	6	6	6
(United States) Newell	0	4	3
(United States) Dornheim	1	1	2
(Japan) Shimizu	6	6	6

Third round
(United States) Johnson	6	6	6
(United States) de Turenne	3	2	1
(United States) Wear	2	0	1
(Japan) Shimizu	6	6	6

Fourth round
(United States) Johnson	6	6	4	6	4
(Japan) Shimizu	8	4	6	4	6

==== Section 7 ====
First round
(United States) Williams	6	6	4	6
(United States) Wright	0	2	6	2
(United States) Whitbeck	6	6	6
(United States) Thompson	0	1	1
(United States) Hall	6	6	6
(United States) Wieder	2	4	2
(United States) Coffin	6	6	6
(United States) Graham	1	2	3
(United States) Goldsborough
(United States) Neer	w/	o
(United States) Johnson	6	6	7
(United States) Sheridan	3	3	5
(United States) Kelleher	6	6	6
(United States) Goldman	1	1	3
(United States) Binzen	6	6	6
(United States) Wightman	2	1	3

Second round
(United States) Williams	6	7	6
(United States) Whitbeck	4	5	3
(United States) Hall	6	6	6
(United States) Coffin	2	0	4
(United States) Goldsborough	6	8	6	6	0
(United States) Johnson	3	10	1	8	6
(United States) Kelleher	6	4	3	6	5
(United States) Binzen	2	6	6	3	7

Third round
(United States) Williams	6	6	6
(United States) Hall	3	3	3
(United States) Johnson	2	6	4	2
(United States) Binzen	6	2	6	6

Fourth round
(United States) Williams	6	6	6
(United States) Binzen	0	2	1

==== Section 8 ====
First round
(United States) Hunter	6	6	6
(United States) Golden	1	2	4
(United States) Gilpin	4	4	10	6	6
(United States) Pate	6	6	8	3	2
(United States) Rice	6	6	6
(United States) Kiefer	0	3	3
(United States) Baggs	4	6	7	6
(United States) Emerson	6	4	5	2
(United States) Ingraham
(United States) Jones	w/	o

Second round
(United States) Hunter	6	6	7
(United States) Gilpin	3	0	5
(United States) Rice	6	6	4	6
(United States) Baggs	3	4	6	2
(United States) Ingraham	4	6	6	5	6
(United States) Major	6	0	3	7	2
(Australia) Patterson	6	6	6
(United States) Hubbell	0	0	2

Third round
(United States) Hunter	7	6	3	6	6
(United States) Rice	9	3	6	3	3
(United States) Ingraham	3	3	5
(Australia) Patterson	6	6	7

Fourth round
(United States) Hunter	6	1	5
(Australia) Patterson	8	6	7

Preceded by 1922 Wimbledon Championships	Grand Slams; Men's Singles	Succeeded by 1923 Australasian Championships
