= 1923 U.S. National Championships – Men's singles =

Men's singles
- 1923 U.S. National Championships

Final
- Champion: (United States) Bill Tilden
- Runner-up: (United States) Bill Johnston
- Score: 6–4, 6–1, 6–4

Details
- Draw: 64
- Seeds: N.A.

Events
Singles	men	women		boys	girls
Doubles	men	women	mixed	boys	girls
- U.S. National Championships

Three-time defending champion Bill Tilden defeated Bill Johnston in the final, 6–4, 6–1, 6–4 to win the men's singles tennis title at the 1923 U.S. National Championships. It was Tilden's fourth U.S. Championships singles title and sixth major singles title overall.

== Draw ==
Key

- Q = Qualifier
- WC = Wild card
- LL = Lucky loser
- Alt = Alternate
- ITF = ITF entry
- PR = Protected ranking
- SR = Special ranking
- SE = Special exempt
- JE = Junior exempt
- JR = Junior Accelerator Programme entrant
- CO = College Accelerator Programme entrant
- NG = Next Gen Accelerator Program entrant
- w/o = Walkover
- r = Retired
- d = Defaulted

=== Final eight ===
Quarterfinals
(United States) Bill Tilden	6	6	6
(Spain) Manuel Alonso	0	0	2
(United States) R. Norris Williams	6	3	4	6	4
(South Africa) Brian Norton	1	6	6	3	6
(United States) Bill Johnston	8	6	7
(United States) Frank Anderson	6	1	5
(United States) Frank Hunter	6	6	8
(United States) Robert Kinsey	2	4	6

Semifinals
(United States) Bill Tilden	6	7	6
(South Africa) Brian Norton	3	5	2
(United States) Bill Johnston	6	6	7
(United States) Frank Hunter	4	2	5

Final
(United States) Bill Tilden	6	6	6
(United States) Bill Johnston	4	1	4

=== Earlier rounds ===
==== Section 1 ====
First round
(United States) Tilden	6	3	6	6
(United States) Washburn	3	6	3	4
(United States) Voshell	6	7	6
(United States) Major	4	5	4
(United States) Fischer	6	7	6
(United States) Curley	1	5	3
(United States) Binzen	6	4	9	6
(United States) Von Bernuth	2	6	7	4
(France) Brugnon
(Japan) Fukuda	w/	o
(United States) Brown	6	6	6
(United States) LeRoy	1	3	2
(Australia) McInnes	6	6	6
(United States) Davis	4	1	3
(Spain) Alonso	6	6	6
(United States) Wood	2	3	1

Second round
(United States) Tilden	6	6	6
(United States) Voshell	2	0	0
(United States) Fischer	6	6	6
(United States) Binzen	1	2	4
(France) Brugnon	6	6	7
(United States) Brown	3	2	5
(Australia) McInnes	1	0	1
(Spain) Alonso	6	6	6

Third round
(United States) Tilden	6	6	6
(United States) Fischer	1	2	2
(France) Brugnon	3	2	6	7	4
(Spain) Alonso	6	6	3	5	6

Quarterfinals
(United States) Tilden	6	6	6
(Spain) Alonso	0	0	2

==== Section 2 ====
First round
(United States) Williams	6	6	6
(United States) Bates	3	1	2
(Japan) Shimizu
(Mexico) Butlin	w/	o
(United Kingdom) Crawford	6	6	7
(United States) Emerson	4	3	5
(United States) Wesbrook
(United States) Mathey	w/	o
(United States) Beekman
(United States) Garland	w/	o
(United States) Thayer	2	6	6	3	6
(United States) Potter Wear	6	3	3	6	1
(United States) Neer	6	4	6	6
(United States) Davies	3	6	0	4
(South Africa) Norton	12	6	4	6
(United States) de Turenne	10	2	6	4

Second round
(United States) Williams
(Japan) Shimizu	w/	o
(United Kingdom) Crawford	3	6	5	6	6
(United States) Wesbrook	6	4	7	0	1
(United States) Beekman	6	6	6
(United States) Thayer	0	4	2
(United States) Neer	0	2	3
(United States) Norton	6	6	6

Third round
(United States) Williams	6	6	6
(United Kingdom) Crawford	3	4	0
(United States) Beekman	2	1	2
(South Africa) Norton	6	6	6

Quarterfinals
(United States) Williams	6	3	4	6	4
(South Africa) Norton	1	6	6	3	6

==== Section 3 ====
First round
(United States) Johnston	6	7	6
(United States) Pfaffman	2	5	3
(Spain) Alonso	6	6	6
(United States) Evans	2	3	3
(United States) Kinsey	7	6	6	6
(Australia) Schlesinger	9	1	1	2
(United States) Mercur	6	6	6
(United States) Charest	2	3	4
(United States) Bowman
(United States) Chapin	w/	o
(United States) King	6	6	6
(Canada) Crocker	3	4	2
(United States) Anderson	7	3	4	12	6
(United States) Niles	5	6	6	10	4
(United States) Bassford
(Australia) Hawkes	w/	o

Second round
(United States) Johnston	6	6	6
(Spain) Alonso	4	3	1
(United States) Kinsey	6	6	9
(United States) Mercur	2	4	7
(United States) Bowman	3	4	3
(United States) King	6	6	6
(United States) Anderson	6	7	6
(United States) Bassford	0	5	2

Third round
(United States) Johnston	6	10	6
(United States) Kinsey	1	8	3
(United States) King	6	1	4
(United States) Anderson	8	6	6

Quarterfinals
(United States) Johnston	8	6	7
(United States) Anderson	6	1	5

==== Section 4 ====
First round
(United States) Richards	8	6	7
(United States) Kelleher	6	3	5
(United States) Snodgrass	6	6	7
(United States) Graves	0	2	5
(United States) Hunter	6	6	6
(United States) Lang	2	4	4
(France) Lacoste	6	6	6
(United States) Griffin	2	0	2
(France) Hirsch
(United States) Jones	w/	o
(United States) Kinsey	6	6	6
(United States) Johnson	2	2	2
(United States) Ingraham	0	6	6	6
(United States) Kynaston	6	4	3	1
(United States) Pearson
(Australia) Anderson	w/	o

Second round
(United States) Richards	6	6	6
(United States) Snodgrass	1	4	3
(United States) Hunter	1	6	6	1	6
(France) Lacoste	6	0	2	6	3
(France) Hirsch	1	1	2
(United States) Kinsey	6	6	6
(United States) Ingraham	6	1	6
(United States) Pearson	8	6	8

Third round
(United States) Richards	6	6	6	4	4
(United States) Hunter	8	4	2	6	6
(United States) Kinsey	9	6	6
(United States) Pearson	7	2	2

Quarterfinals
(United States) Hunter	6	6	8
(United States) Kinsey	2	4	6

Preceded by 1923 Wimbledon Championships	Grand Slams; Men's Singles	Succeeded by 1924 Australasian Championships
