= 1925 U.S. National Championships – Men's singles =

Men's singles
- 1925 U.S. National Championships

Final
- Champion: (United States) Bill Tilden
- Runner-up: (United States) Bill Johnston
- Score: 4–6, 11–9, 6–3, 4–6, 6–3

Details
- Draw: 64
- Seeds: N.A.

Events
Singles	men	women		boys	girls
Doubles	men	women	mixed	boys	girls
- U.S. National Championships

Five-time defending champion Bill Tilden defeated Bill Johnston in the final, 4–6, 11–9, 6–3, 4–6, 6–3 to win the men's singles tennis title at the 1925 U.S. National Championships. It was Tilden's sixth U.S. Championships title and his eight major title overall.

== Draw ==
Key

- Q = Qualifier
- WC = Wild card
- LL = Lucky loser
- Alt = Alternate
- ITF = ITF entry
- PR = Protected ranking
- SR = Special ranking
- SE = Special exempt
- JE = Junior exempt
- JR = Junior Accelerator Programme entrant
- CO = College Accelerator Programme entrant
- NG = Next Gen Accelerator Program entrant
- w/o = Walkover
- r = Retired
- d = Defaulted

=== Final eight ===
Quarterfinals
(United States) Bill Johnston	6	6	6	6
(Spain) Manuel Alonso	3	8	1	2
(United States) Howard Kinsey	5	4	3
(United States) R. Norris Williams	7	6	6
(United States) Bill Tilden	6	6	6
(United States) Wallace Johnson	4	0	4
(United States) Vincent Richards	6	6	6
(France) René Lacoste	4	4	3

Semifinals
(United States) Bill Johnston	7	6	6
(United States) R. Norris Williams	5	3	2
(United States) Bill Tilden	6	6	6	6
(United States) Vincent Richards	8	4	4	1

Final
(United States) Bill Johnston	6	9	3	6	3
(United States) Bill Tilden	4	11	6	4	6

=== Earlier rounds ===
==== Section 1 ====
First round
(United States) Johnston	6	6	6
(United States) Orser	2	3	3
(United States) de Turenne
(United States) Washburn	w/	o
(United States) Lott	6	6	6
(United States) Talmadge	4	4	1
(France) Brugnon	6	3	6	4	7
(United States) Van Ryn	2	6	2	6	5
(United States) King	6	6	'6
(United States) Dailey	2	3	4
(United States) Chapin
(France) Decugis	w/	o
(India) Hadi	6	6	7	6
(United States) Pfeiffer	4	4	9	0
(Spain) Alonso	6	6	6
(United States) Shaw	1	0	2

Second round
(United States) Johnston	6	6	10
(United States) de Turenne	0	4	8
(United States) Lott	1	6	6	6
(France) Brugnon	6	2	3	2
(United States) King	5	1	6	3
(United States) Chapin	7	6	3	6
(India) Hadi	6	5	2
(Spain) Alonso	8	7	6

Third round
(United States) Johnston	6	6	6
(United States) Lott	0	3	3
(United States) Chapin	0	6	3
(Spain) Alonso	6	8	6

Quarterfinals
(United States) Johnston	6	6	6	6
(Spain) Alonso	3	8	1	2

==== Section 2 ====
First round
(United States) Kinsey	4	6	6	6
(Japan) Fukuda	6	2	0	4
(United States) Binzen	6	6	6
(United States) Behr	4	0	2
(United States) Lang	6	7	6
(United States) Major	2	5	1
(United States) Kynaston	6	6	6
(United States) Bowman	3	2	2
(United States) Williams	6	6	6
(United States) Sullivan	1	1	1
(United States) Niles
(United States) Mathey	w/	o
(United States) Herndon
(United States) Ingraham	w/	o
(France) Borotra	8	6	6
(United States) Marsh	6	4	2

Second round
(United States) Kinsey	6	6	6
(United States) Binzen	1	2	4
(United States) Lang	7	6	6
(United States) Kynaston	5	4	2
(United States) Williams	6	6	6
(United States) Niles	2	2	2
(United States) Herndon	4	3	9	4
(France) Borotra	6	6	7	6

Third round
(United States) Kinsey	6	4	6	6
(United States) Lang	4	6	0	0
(United States) Williams	6	6	6
(France) Borotra	2	2	2

Quarterfinals
(United States) Kinsey	5	4	3
(United States) Williams	7	6	6

==== Section 3 ====
First round
(United States) Tilden	9	6	7
(United States) Fischer	7	0	5
(United States) Williams	6	6	2	6
(United States) von Bernuth	4	2	6	3
(United States) Baggs	4	6	6	6
(United States) Baker	6	1	4	3
(Japan) Onda	7	6	2	6
(United States) O'Loughlin	5	4	6	4
(United States) Johnson	6	6	6
(United States) Seeligson	1	0	3
(United States) Voshell	6	6	6
(United States) Kuhn	2	2	1
(United States) Kelleher	6	6	4	9
(United States) Fisher	3	2	6	7
(Australia) Anderson	6	6	6
(United States) Jones	1	1	3

Second round
(United States) Tilden	6	7	3	6
(United States) Williams	2	5	6	1
(United States) Baggs	4	4	6	6	2
(Japan) Onda	6	6	4	4	6
(United States) Johnson	8	4	6	2	6
(United States) Voshell	6	6	4	6	2
(United States) Kelleher	1	3	2
(Australia) Anderson	6	6	6

Third round
(United States) Tilden	6	6	6
(Japan) Onda	3	3	2
(United States) Johnson	6	3	6	7
(Australia) Anderson	4	6	4	5

Quarterfinals
(United States) Tilden	6	6	6
(United States) Johnson	4	0	4

==== Section 4 ====
First round
(United States) Richards	6	6	6
(Japan) Iwasaki	0	1	2
(United States) Donaldson	7	6	2	4	9
(United States) Dornheim	5	3	6	6	7
(United States) Caldwell	6	6	6
(United States) Weinstein	2	2	3
(Japan) Harada	6	6	1	6
(United States) Mangan	0	1	6	3
(South Africa) Norton
(United States) Hutchinson	w/	o
(United States) Brown	6	10	6
(United States) Anderson	3	8	2
(United States) Hunter	6	6	6
(Spain) Alonso	2	4	2
(France) Lacoste	6	6	6
(United States) Scott	0	1	3

Second round
(United States) Richards	6	6	6
(United States) Donaldson	2	3	1
(United States) Caldwell	4	3	5
(Japan) Harada	6	6	7
(South Africa) Norton	6	6	6
(United States) Brown	1	4	1
(United States) Hunter	2	4	5
(France) Lacoste	6	6	7

Third round
(United States) Richards	6	6	8
(Japan) Harada	3	0	6
(South Africa) Norton	4	6	6	6	6
(France) Lacoste	6	2	8	3	8

Quarterfinals
(United States) Richards	6	6	6
(France) Lacoste	4	4	3

Preceded by 1925 Wimbledon Championships	Grand Slams; Men's Singles	Succeeded by 1926 Australasian Championships
