= 1926 U.S. National Championships – Men's singles =

Men's singles
- 1926 U.S. National Championships

Final
- Champion: (France) René Lacoste
- Runner-up: (France) Jean Borotra
- Score: 6–4, 6–0, 6–4

Details
- Draw: 64
- Seeds: N.A.

Events
Singles	men	women		boys	girls
Doubles	men	women	mixed	boys	girls
- U.S. National Championships

René Lacoste defeated Jean Borotra in the final, 6–4, 6–0, 6–4 to win the men's singles tennis title at the 1926 U.S. National Championships. It was Lacoste's first U.S. Championships title and his third major title overall.

Bill Tilden was the six-time defending champion, but was defeated in the quarterfinals by reigning French Championships champion Henri Cochet.

== Draw ==
Key

- Q = Qualifier
- WC = Wild card
- LL = Lucky loser
- Alt = Alternate
- ITF = ITF entry
- PR = Protected ranking
- SR = Special ranking
- SE = Special exempt
- JE = Junior exempt
- JR = Junior Accelerator Programme entrant
- CO = College Accelerator Programme entrant
- NG = Next Gen Accelerator Program entrant
- w/o = Walkover
- r = Retired
- d = Defaulted

=== Final eight ===
Quarterfinals
(United States) Bill Tilden	8	1	3	6	6
(France) Henri Cochet	6	6	6	1	8
(United States) R. Norris Williams	0	3	6
(France) René Lacoste	6	6	8
(United States) Vincent Richards	6	6	6
(France) Jacques Brugnon	2	1	2
(United States) Bill Johnston	6	6	3	4	4
(France) Jean Borotra	3	4	6	6	6

Semifinals
(France) Henri Cochet	6	6	4	4	3
(France) René Lacoste	2	4	6	6	6
(United States) Vincent Richards	6	4	6	6	2
(France) Jean Borotra	3	6	4	8	6

Final
(France) René Lacoste	6	6	6
(France) Jean Borotra	4	0	4

=== Earlier rounds ===
==== Section 1 ====
First round
(United States) Tilden	6	3	7	6
(United States) Van Ryn	4	6	5	2
(United States) Sullivan	6	6	7
(United States) Thalheimer	3	3	5
(United States) Jones	6	6	1	7	6
(United States) Mercur	4	4	6	9	0
(Japan) Tawara	6	6	7
(United States) Shields	4	2	5
(United States) Chapin	7	10	4	6	6
(United States) Major	5	12	6	4	2
(United States) Hunter	6	6	6
(United States) Heyden	2	4	3
(United States) Griffin	6	6	6
(United States) Hennessey	2	4	2
(France) Cochet	6	9	6
(United States) Ingraham	3	7	2

Second round
(United States) Tilden	4	6	6	6
(United States) Sullivan	6	4	2	1
(United States) Jones	2	6	2	6	6
(Japan) Tawara	6	4	6	3	1
(United States) Chapin	2	7	6	3
(United States) Hunter	6	5	8	6
(United States) Griffin	0	4	4
(United States) Cochet	6	6	6

Third round
(United States) Tilden	7	7	4	6	6
(United States) Jones	9	5	6	1	2
(United States) Hunter	5	3	6	3
(France) Cochet	7	6	0	6

Quarterfinals
(United States) Tilden	8	1	3	6	6
(France) Cochet	6	6	6	1	8

==== Section 2 ====
First round
(United States) Williams	6	6	7
(United States) Neer	3	3	5
(United States) Fischer	6	3	9	7
(United States) Anderson	2	6	7	5
(United States) Feibleman	9	6	6	7
(United States) Dailey	11	2	4	5
(United States) Bowman	7	6	8
(Canada) Wright	5	1	6
(Spain) Alonso	6	7	6	6
(United States) Johnson	1	9	1	1
(United States) Kelleher	4	6	6	6
(United States) Baggs	6	2	4	3
(United States) Hill	5	8	6	1	8
(United States) Niles	7	6	4	6	6
(France) Lacoste	6	6	6
(United States) Garland	2	1	0

Second round
(United States) Williams	6	9	6
(United States) Fischer	3	7	1
(United States) Feibleman	7	6	1	6	2
(United States) Bowman	5	1	6	8	6
(Spain) Alonso	6	6	8
(United States) Kelleher	2	2	6
(United States) Hill	0	3	4
(France) Lacoste	6	6	6

Third round
(United States) Williams	4	6	6	6
(United States) Bowman	6	2	3	4
(Spain) Alonso	1	2	6	2
(France) Lacoste	6	6	4	6

Quarterfinals
(United States) Williams	0	3	6
(France) Lacoste	6	6	8

==== Section 3 ====
First round
(United States) Richards	6	6	6
(United States) Orser	1	2	1
(United States) Lott	6	6	6
(United States) Binzen	1	0	1
(United States) Appel	4	6	6	7
(United States) Reid	6	4	2	5
(Japan) Toba	5	6	7	6
(United States) Seligson	7	2	5	3
(Japan) Harada	6	6	6
(United States) Kynaston	3	1	3
(United States) King	6	6	6
(United States) Lewis	4	3	3
(United States) Lang	6	6	6
(United States) Owens	4	0	3
(France) Brugnon	6	6	6
(United States) Barr	2	2	3

Second round
(United States) Richards	6	6	4	6
(United States) Lott	0	2	6	4
(United States) Appel	1	5	3
(Japan) Toba	6	7	6
(Japan) Harada	4	6	6
(United States) King	6	8	8
(United States) Lang	6	9	6	4	0
(France) Brugnon	4	11	3	6	6

Third round
(United States) Richards	6	6	6
(Japan) Toba	0	2	4
(United States) King	3	2	9	7	1
(France) Brugnon	6	6	7	5	6

Quarterfinals
(United States) Richards	6	6	6
(France) Brugnon	2	1	2

==== Section 4 ====
First round
(United States) Johnston	6	6	6
(United States) Baker	2	4	1
(United States) Holman
(United States) Ogden	w/	o
(United States) Johnson	6	3	4	6	6
(United States) Hubbell	4	6	6	4	3
(United States) Jacobs	3	6	6	4
(Mexico) Llano	6	2	3	2	rtd.
(United States) Chandler	10	3	7	6
(United States) Norton	8	6	5	1
(United States) White	6	6	6
(United States) Marsh	3	2	2
(United States) Washburn	9	1	4	6	6
(United States) Voshell	7	6	6	4	4
(France) Borotra	6	6	9
(United States) Watters	3	3	7

Second round
(United States) Johnston
(United States) Holman	w/	o
(United States) Johnson	9	3	6	6	4
(United States) Jacobs	11	6	1	1	6
(United States) Chandler	6	6	6
(United States) White	4	3	2
(United States) Washburn	9	4	3	3
(France) Borotra	7	6	6	6

Third round
(United States) Johnston	6	6	8
(United States) Jacobs	2	3	6
(United States) Chandler	2	3	2
(France) Borotra	6	6	6

Quarterfinals
(United States) Johnston	6	6	3	4	4
(France) Borotra	3	4	6	6	6

Preceded by 1926 Wimbledon Championships	Grand Slams; Men's Singles	Succeeded by 1927 Australian Championships
