= Leslie Bancroft =

American tennis player

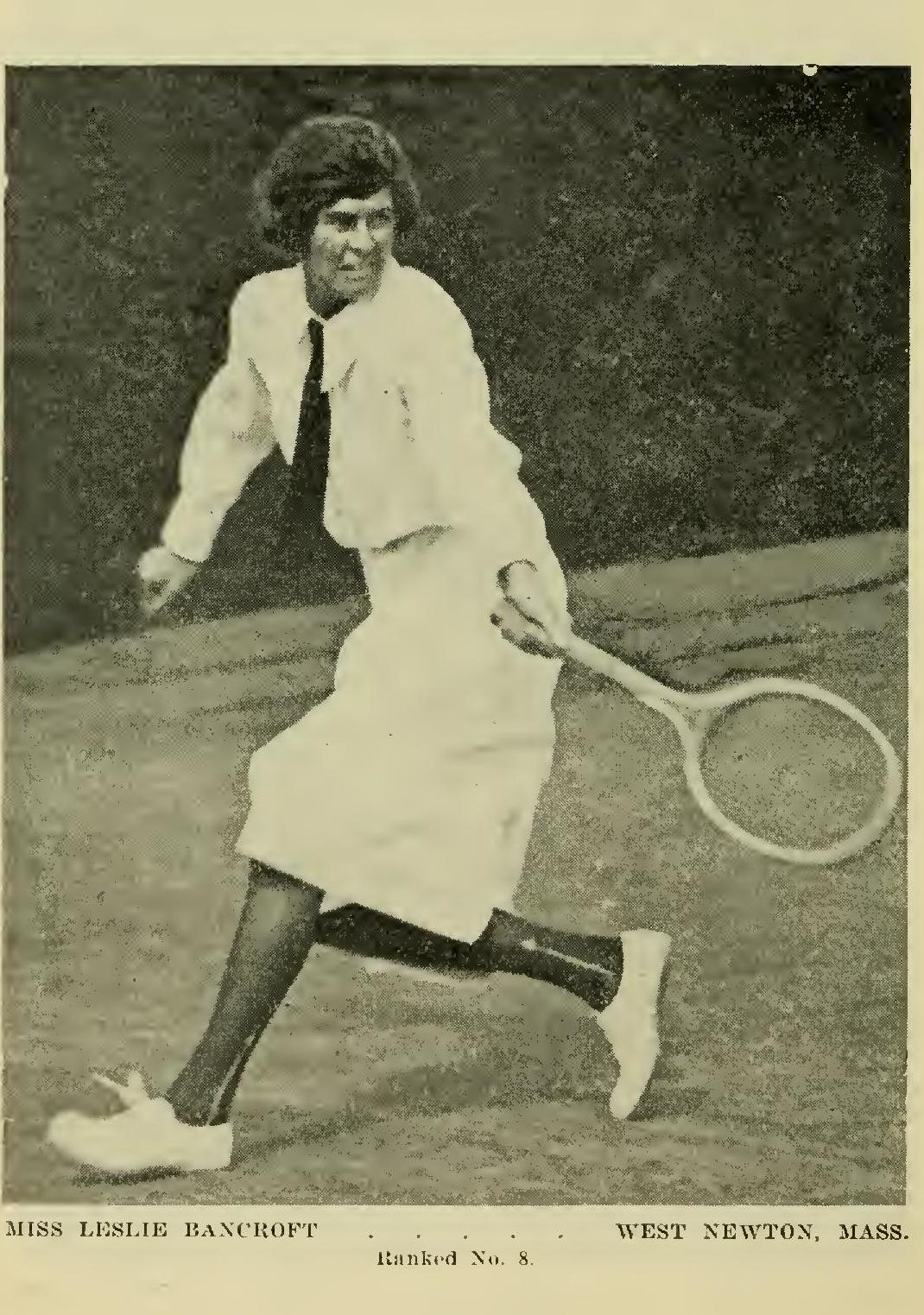
- Full name: Leslie Bancroft Aeschlimann
- Country (sports): United States
- Born: United States
- Plays: Left-handed

Singles

Grand Slam singles results
- US Open: SF (1922)

Doubles

Grand Slam doubles results
- US Open: SF (1922)

Leslie Bancroft Aeschlimann (née Bancroft) was a female tennis player from the United States who was active in the 1920s.

Bancroft reached the semi-finals of the singles event at the 1922 U.S. Championships, which she lost in straight sets to eventual champion Molla Mallory. That same year she was runner-up to Mallory at the U.S. Women's Indoor Championships which was played on wooden courts at the Longwood Cricket Club in Chestnut Hill, Massachusetts.

In 1922, she lost to Canadian player Lois Moyes Bickle in the finals of the singles event at the U.S. Women's Clay Court Championships in Buffalo, New York.

The next year, 1923, she again reached the final of the U.S. Women's Indoor Championships but this time lost in two sets to Ann Sheafe Cole.

She married Swiss tennis player Charles Aeschlimann on December 16, 1924. They had met at the 1924 Summer Olympics.
