= Alfred Chapin =

Alfred Chapin may refer to:

- Alfred C. Chapin (1848–1936), American lawyer and politician
- Alfred Chapin (tennis) (1901–1961), American tennis player
