= 1926 U.S. National Championships – Women's singles =

Women's singles
- 1926 U.S. National Championships

Final
- Champion: (United States) Molla Mallory
- Runner-up: (United States) Elizabeth Ryan
- Score: 4–6, 6–4, 9–7

Details
- Draw: 64

Events
Singles	men	women
Doubles	men	women
- U.S. National Championships

Forty-two-year-old Molla Mallory defeated Elizabeth Ryan 4–6, 6–4, 9–7 in the final to win the women's singles tennis title at the 1926 U.S. National Championships. The event was held at the West Side Tennis Club, Forest Hills, New York City. Mallory became the oldest U.S. Open champion in history. It was Mallory's eighth and final U.S. National singles title.

== Draw ==
=== Final eight ===
Quarterfinals
(United States) Elizabeth Ryan	3	6	6
(United States) Eleanor Goss	6	4	0
(United States) Mary Browne	7	6
(United States) Penelope Anderson	5	1
(United States) Margaret Blake	4	2
(United States) Martha Bayard	6	6
(United States) Molla Mallory	7	6
(United States) Charlotte Chapin	5	0

Semifinals
(United States) Elizabeth Ryan	6	6
(United States) Mary Browne	1	3
(United States) Martha Bayard	3	3
(United States) Molla Mallory	6	6

Finals
(United States) Elizabeth Ryan	6	4	7
(United States) Molla Mallory	4	6	9

Preceded by 1926 Wimbledon Championships – Women's singles	Grand Slam women's singles	Succeeded by 1927 Australian Championships – Women's singles
