= Cranston Holman =

American tennis player (1907–1993)

- Full name: Cranston William Holman
- Country (sports): USA
- Born: January 5, 1907 Pasadena, California, United States
- Died: December 10, 1993 (aged 86) New York City, NY, United States
- Turned pro: 1924 (amateur tour)
- Retired: 1930

Singles
- Career titles: 3

Grand Slam singles results
- US Open: 2R (1926)

Cranston William Holman (January 5, 1907 – 10 December 1993) was a leading American tennis player in the 1920s and was the eighth ranked player in the United States for 1925. He played at the 1926 U.S. National Championships, and won three career singles titles including the Pacific Coast Championships. After his tennis career he became a thoracic surgeon and was one of the pioneers of heart-lung transplants.

== Tennis career ==
Holman was born on January 5, 1907, in Pasadena, California, United States.

In 1925, while at Stanford University, Holman reached the final at the Intercollegiate Championships before falling to Ed "Bud" Chandler of the University of California. Also that year, he reached the finals of the Essex County Invitational (losing to Manuel Alonso Areizaga), and the Delaware State Championships (losing Fritz Mercur). Holman was ranked the U.S. No. 8 singles player for 1925 by the USLTA.

In 1926, he reached the second round of the U.S. National Championships before losing to Bill Johnston. Also that year, he was a quarterfinalist at the U.S. Clay Court Championships (where he lost George Lott).

In 1927 he reached the finals of the Longwood Bowl before losing to John Doeg.

In 1928 he won his first singles title at the Pacific Coast Championships defeating Bobby Seller in the final.

In 1929 he won a second title at the California State Championship against Bobby Seller.

In 1930 he won his final title at the Mid-Pacific Championships in Hawaii against Jiro Sato of Japan. Holman played his final singles tournament at the California State Championships where he exited the event in the semi-finals.

In 1932, while he was working at the University of Cincinnati medical school, he paired with Reuben A. Holden III (a former intercollegiate single champion from Yale University) to reach the men's doubles finals at the Cincinnati Open. Holman and Holden were unseeded and lost to the top-seeded team of J. Gilbert Hall and Fritz Mercur.

Following his retirement from tennis he later became a notable surgeon who pioneered the first heart lung transplant, and died in New York City on December 10, 1993, at the age of 86, survived by his second wife, physician Constance Friess Holman.

== Education ==
Holman attended Stanford University in 1925 and balanced his tennis with his studies. He earned an AB and received his MD degree in 1931.

== Academic career ==
In 1935, he joined the faculty of Cornell University Medical College and in 1937 he became a research fellow. Between 1937 and 1938 he was an associate (in surgery), and in 1938 he was promoted to assistant professor of surgery until 1946 when he became an associate professor of clinical surgery. In 1958. he was promoted again to professor of clinical surgery and remained in that capacity until 1975.
