= Edith E. Nicholls =

American physician (1892–1978)

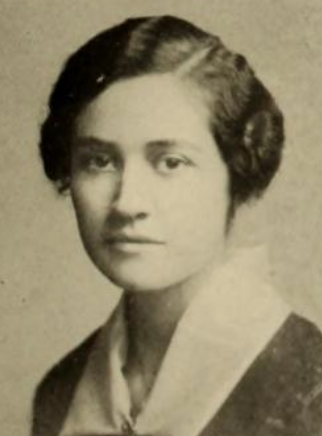
- Edith E. Nicholls, from the 1919 yearbook of Smith College
- Born: September 29, 1892; Cleveland, Ohio
- Died: March 12, 1978 (aged 85); Alachua, Florida
- Other name: Edith Stainsby
- Occupations: Physician, medical researcher

Edith Evelyn Nicholls Stainsby (September 29, 1892 – March 12, 1978) was an American physician and medical researcher.

== Early life and education ==
Nicholls was born in Cleveland, Ohio, the daughter of Mark Mitchell Nicholls and Elizabeth Jane Frees Nicholls. Her father was born in England and owned the Nicholls Tubing Factory. She graduated from Smith College in 1919, and earned degrees in public health and child psychology at Johns Hopkins University. She earned her medical degree at the Yale School of Medicine in 1926.

== Career ==
Nicholls was a pediatric specialist, with particular expertise in rheumatoid arthritis and polio. She was on the staff of the Children's Bureau in Washington, D.C. She lived in China as a young woman, and spoke about her experiences there to women's groups afterward. She taught at Cornell University Medical College from 1927 to 1937.

Nicholls was chief of the arthritis clinic at Geisinger Memorial Hospital in Pennsylvania from 1940 to 1943, and head of pediatrics at Geisinger from 1943 to 1950. She was appointed director of the Montour County Well-Baby Clinic in 1952. In 1964 she became president of the Soroptimist Club of Montour County.

== Publications ==
Nicholls published her research in academic journals in the 1920s and 1930s, including Journal of Comparative Psychology, American Journal of Epidemiology, Journal of Clinical Investigation, Archives of Internal Medicine, Journal of Experimental Medicine, Journal of Laboratory and Clinical Medicine, Journal of Bacteriology, Journal of the American Medical Association, Annals of Internal Medicine, and The Journal of Infectious Diseases.

- "A Study of the Spontaneous Activity of the Guinea Pig" (1922)
- "The relation between fatigue and the susceptibility of guinea pigs to infections of type I pneumococcus" (1922, with Reynold A. Spaeth)
- "Performances in Certain Mental Tests of Children Classified as Underweight and Normal" (1923)
- "Studies in Scarlet Fever III: Infections with Streptococcus Scarlatinae in Persons with Scarlatinal Antitoxic Immunity" (1926)
- "The Persistence of Streptococcus scarlatinae in the Throat of Convalescent Scarlet Fever Patients." (1927)
- "The Bacteriology of the Blood and Joints in Chronic Infectious Arthritis" (1929, with Russell L. Cecil, and Wendell J. Stainsby)
- "Bacteriology of the Blood and Joins in Rheumatic Fever" (1929, with Russell L. Cecil and Wendell J. Stainsby)
- "Streptococcal Agglutinins in Chronic Infectious Arthritis" (1931, with Wendell J. Stainsby)
- "Technic for the Isolation of Streptococci" (1932, with Wendell J. Stainsby)
- "Further Studies on the Agglutination Reaction in Chronic Arthritis" (1933, with Wendell J. Stainsby)
- "The Clinical Significance of the Erythrocytic Sedimentation Test in Rheumatoid Arthritis" (1933 with Wendell J. Stainsby)
- "The Incidence and Biological Characteristics of the Hemolytic Bacillus Coli in the Stools of Healthy Individuals" (1934)
- "Treatment of Rheumatoid Arthritis with Hyperthermia Produced by a High-Frequency Current" (1934, with K. G. Hansson and Wendell J. Stainsby)
- "The Classification of a Group of Escherichia Isolated from the Intestinal Tract of Patients with Ulcerative Colitis" (1935, with H. P. Saltz)
- "Malarial Therapy in Rheumatoid Arthritis" (1935, with Russell L. Cecil and Constance Friess)
- "The Treatment of Rheumatoid Arthritis with an Injectable Form of Bee Venom" (1938, with Jacques Kroner, Robert M. Lintz, Marion Tyndall, and Leonora Andersen)
- "A Study of the Organisms Recovered from Filtrates of Cultures of Hemolytic Streptococci" (1938)
- "The incidence of a normal spinal fluid in acute poliomyelitis" (1950)

== Personal life ==
Nicholls married fellow physician Wendell J. Stainsby in 1928, in Toronto. They had a son, Wendell, and a daughter, Gail. Her husband died in 1969. She moved to Florida in 1973, and died in Gainesville, Florida in 1978, in her eighties.
