= Constance Friess Holman =

American physician

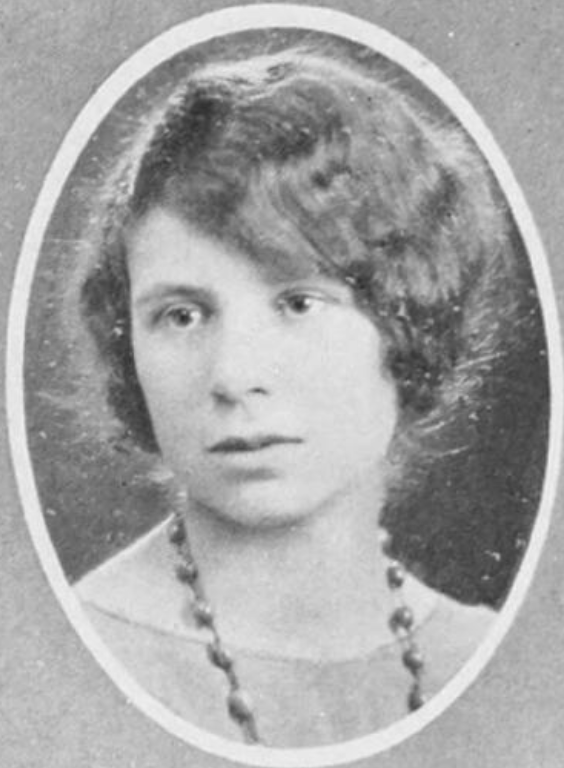
- Constance Friess Holman, from the 1928 yearbook of Barnard College
- Born: Constance Friess; February 11, 1908; New York City, U.S.
- Died: July 23, 1999 (aged 91); Brattleboro, Vermont, U.S.
- Occupation: Physician
- Spouse: Cranston Holman
- Relatives: Horace L. Friess (brother)

Constance Friess Holman (February 11, 1908 – July 23, 1999) was an American physician and civil rights activist. She practiced internal medicine in New York City, where she was "the first woman to become chief resident in medicine at New York Hospital".

== Early life and education ==
Friess was born in New York City, the daughter of Louis G. Friess and Louise S. Jagle Friess. Her father was a lawyer. Her older brother was ethicist Horace L. Friess. She graduated from Barnard College in 1928, and earned her medical degree from Cornell University Medical School, where she was first in her class in 1932. Publisher Adolph Ochs loaned her the money to attend medical school, because she had tutored his grandchildren during college; he forgave the debt when he died.

== Career ==
Holman practiced internal medicine in New York City for 55 years. She taught clinical medicine at Weill Cornell, and she ran a drug treatment program. As a member of the Medical Committee for Human Rights, she traveled to Mississippi in 1964 to support in civil rights actions there. In the 1970s, she made house calls to elderly patients from her office on East 66th Street, and testified before the Senate Special Committee on Aging about the problems her patients encountered, saying "there are times when we physicians, who care for the elderly in their homes, feel as isolated from the mainstream of medical care as our patients feel isolated from the mainstream of community life".

Holman was also a close friend and physician to artist Georgia O'Keeffe. She gave an oral history interview to the Georgia O'Keeffe Museum Archives about their friendship. A painting O'Keeffe once gave to Holman, "White Rose with Larkspur No. I" (1927), sold for over $26 million at a 2022 auction.

== Publications ==
- "Malarial Therapy in Rheumatoid Arthritis" (1935, with Russell L. Cecil and Edith E. Nicholls)

== Personal life ==
Friess married twice. Her first husband was surgeon William Alexander Cooper; they married in 1936, had two children, Jane and Peter, and divorced in 1969. Her second husband was surgeon Cranston W. Holman. Her second husband died in 1993, and she died in 1999, at the age of 91, from pneumonia.
