= Pacific Coast Pro Championships =

Defunct tennis tournament
- Tour: Pro Tennis Tour (1946-1967); ILTF World Open Circuit (1968)
- Location: Berkeley; Beverley Hills; Fresno; San Francisco; United States
- Venue: California Tennis Club (1946); Beverly Hills Tennis Club (1954); Cow Palace (1957); Fresno Tennis Club (1965); Berkeley Tennis Club (1967); Fresno Tennis Club (1968)
- Surface: Hard / outdoor Wood / indoor

The Pacific Coast Pro Championships was a men's tennis tournament founded in 1946 as the Pacific Coast Professionals. It was first played in San Francisco, California, United States and was last played in Fresno, California in 1968 when it was discontinued.

A Pacific Coast Professionals tournament was proposed by Howard Kinsey as early as 1930 to be played in Aqua Caliente, Mexico, and again in Berkeley, California 1934. (Note: A proposed Pacific Coast Professionals Assiciation Championships promoted by Howard Kinsey in 1930 and 1934 however no newspaper sources results could be found)

== Past finals ==
=== Singles ===
| Year | Location | Champion | Runner-up | Score |
|---|---|---|---|---|
| 1946 | San Francisco | (United States) Don Budge | (United States) Bobby Riggs | 6–3, 7–5, 6–4 |
| 1954 | Beverly Hills | (Ecuador) Pancho Segura | (United States) Pancho Gonzales | 4–6, 6–4, 9–7 |
| 1957 | Daly City | (United States) Pancho Gonzales | (United States) Tony Trabert | 4–6, 6–4, 9–7 |
| 1960 | Santa Barbara | (Australia) Lew Hoad | (Australia) Ken Rosewall | 6–1, 4–6, 6–3 |
| 1965 | Fresno | (Ecuador) Pancho Segura (2) | (United States) Nick Carter | 6–1, 6–3 |
| 1967 | Berkeley | (Australia) Ken Rosewall | (Australia) Rod Laver | 4–6, 6–3, 8–6 |
| 1968 (Note: The 1968 final was not played due to persitent bad weather both players having won their semi shared the title) | Fresno | (Australia) Fred Stolle | (United States) Barry MacKay | Title shared |

== See also ==
- Pacific Coast Championships (amateur era)
