= Bud Chandler =

American tennis player

- Full name: Edward Grover Chandler
- Country (sports): United States
- Born: September 26, 1905 Santa Cruz, California
- Died: July 2, 1996 (aged 90) Orinda, California

Grand Slam singles results
- Wimbledon: 1R (1929)
- US Open: 3R (1926)

Edward Grover "Bud" Chandler (September 26, 1905 — July 2, 1996) was an American tennis player.

Chandler, raised in Berkeley, California, was a two-time state singles champion and played collegiate tennis for UC Berkeley. He won back to back national intercollegiate singles titles in 1925 and 1926.

Graduating from college in 1926, Chandler competed briefly on tour and was ranked as high as fifth in the country.

In July 1926 he won the Rhode Island State Championships defeating Takeichi Harada, ranked the world No. 7 that year, in the final in four sets.

In 1929 he featured at Wimbledon for the only time and despite a first round exit was still able to win a trophy by claiming the All England Plate.

In March 1932, Chandler won the Huntington Invitational on clay at Pasadena, California defeating Ellsworth Vines in the final in a close three set match.

He is a member of the Northern California Tennis Hall of Fame.

Chandler was a graduate of Harvard Law School and practiced as an attorney after leaving tennis.
