= NielsenIQ =

American marketing research firm

Nielsen Consumer LLC
- Trade name: NIQ
- Formerly: ACNielsen; AC Nielsen
- Type: Public
- Industry: Marketing research
- Founded: 1923; 103 years ago in Chicago, Illinois, U.S.
- Founder: Arthur C. Nielsen Sr.
- Headquarters: Chicago, Illinois, U.S.
- Key people: Jim Peck (Executive chairman and CEO); Tracey Massey (COO)
- Owner: Advent International
- Number of employees: c. 30,000
- Subsidiaries: GfK
- Website: nielseniq.com

NIQ (also known as NielsenIQ, formerly known as ACNielsen or AC Nielsen) is an American marketing research firm, with worldwide headquarters in Chicago, Illinois, United States. The company has approximately 30,000 employees and operates in more than 100 countries. NIQ acquired German market research firm GfK in 2023.

Until March 2021, it was a part of Nielsen Holdings. Nielsen Holdings divested its consumer intelligence (by then known as NielsenIQ) business to private equity firm Advent International. The business later rebranded to NIQ.

== History ==
A.C. Nielsen Company was founded in 1923 in Chicago by Arthur C. Nielsen Sr. in order to give marketers reliable and objective information on the impact of marketing and sales programs. The company began expanding internationally in 1939. Their first location outside of the United States was in the United Kingdom in the city of Oxford, which remains NIQ's UK HQ.

In 1984, A.C. Nielsen was acquired by the Dun & Bradstreet Company (D&B). In 1996, D&B divided AC Nielsen into two separate companies: Nielsen Media Research, which was responsible for TV ratings, and ACNielsen Corporation, which was responsible for consumer shopping trends and box-office data.

In 2001, ACNielsen Corporation itself was acquired by Dutch company Verenigde Nederlandse Uitgeverijen (VNU), as part of VNU's Marketing Information group, and came under the same corporate umbrella as NMR, the company it spawned (VNU acquired NMR in 1999).

In 2005, ACNielsen initiated their Media Voice Panel (MVP) program. With an approximately one week notice to members, the MVP program ended on March 17, 2008.

In 2007, the owner VNU changed its name to Nielsen Company.

On October 8, 2014, Nielsen acquired Affinnova, an international media and marketing research firm. The Affinnova team joins Nielsen's legacy BASES team to form Nielsen's Innovation Practice area. On January 22, 2015, Nielsen acquired Brandbank, specialized in the process of digitally collecting, managing and distributing FMCG product and brand image content for retail syndication across in-store, print promotional and e-commerce platforms.

Nielsen Holdings spun off its consumer data and intelligence business (the former ACNielsen part) as NielsenIQ in January 2021 and then sold the business to private equity firm Advent International in March 2021.

In 2021, NielsenIQ acquired Rakuten Intelligence in the U.S. and Foxintelligence in Europe, gaining access to e-receipt panels that extended its coverage of online retailers outside its traditional datasets.

NIQ gained approval from the European Union to acquire GfK after an antitrust investigation that began in June 2023. This approval was given under the condition of selling GfK consumer panel business, which went to the British market research company YouGov in July 2023.

== Operations ==
A market research tool is the Homescan program where sample members track and report all grocery and retail purchases, allowing purchasing patterns to be related to household demographics. Homescan covers several countries including Australia, Canada, the United Kingdom, and the United States. In 2004, ACNielsen chose the CipherLab CPT-8001 as its data collection terminal for the Homescan program throughout Asia. The Homescan program became known as National Consumer Panel (after formation of a joint venture with Circana) in the United States.

NIQ manages the Nielsen BookScan services outside the United States. The company acts as ISBN agency for the United Kingdom and Republic of Ireland.

NIQ has several marketing and retail research products for companies such as BASES and Brandbank.

In Germany, NIQ (via its subsidiary GfK) manages the GfK Entertainment charts for music, home video, and video game sales.

A former service was the Nielsen ratings, an audience measurement system that measures television, radio and newspaper audiences in their respective media markets. In 1950, A.C. Nielsen acquired the C. E. Hooper company and began attaching recording devices to a statistical sample of about 1200 consumer television sets in the United States. These devices used photographic film in weekly mail-in cartridges to record the channels viewed by the consumer and thus determine audience size. Later, A.C. Nielsen developed electronic methods of data collection and transmission. In 1996, AC Nielsen split off this part of its operations into a separate company called Nielsen Media Research (NMR), which operated as an independent company until it was acquired by Dutch conglomerate VNU in 1999. The company was headquartered in Stamford, Connecticut, before the acquisition by VNU. The Nielsen Media Research later evolved into Global Media division of Nielsen Holdings and separated from Global Connect division (known as NielsenIQ) in 2021.

== See also ==
- Nielsen Media Research
