= Old Dominion Championship =

Defunct tennis tournament
- Tour: USNLTA Circuit (1905-1923); ILTF Circuit (1923-36)
- Founded: 1905; 120 years ago
- Abolished: 1936; 89 years ago
- Location: Richmond, Virginia, United States
- Venue: Hermitage Golf Club (1905-11); Country Club of Virginia (1912-36)
- Surface: Clay

The Old Dominion Championship also known as the Old Dominion Open Championship was a men's and women's clay court tennis tournament founded in 1905. It was first played at the Hermitage Golf Club, Richmond, Virginia, United States in 1905. In 1936 the final edition was played Country Club of Virginia, after which when it was downgraded from the main worldwide ILTF Circuit and discontinued.

== History ==
In 1905 the first edition of the Old Dominion Championships staged at the Hermitage Golf Club, in Richmond, Virginia. The tournament was played annually there until 1911. In 1912 the event was then relocated to the Country Club of Virginia, also in Richmond. The tournament was played on outdoor clay courts usually in late spring or early summer. During World War I in 1917 that edition was given status of a special patriotic tournament held for the benefit of the Red Cross. In 1918 the men's event was staged, but there was no women's tournament that year. It was a sanctioned event on the USNLTA Circuit from 1905 to 1923, then part of the ILTF Circuit from 1924 to 1936 when it was discontinued.

== Finals ==
=== Men's singles ===
(incomplete roll)

Year	Winners	Runners-up	Score
1905	(United States) Frederick Gresham Pollard	(United States) Charles F. McIntosh	6–2, 8–6, 6–1.
1906	(United States) Richard Hooker	(United States) Frederick Gresham Pollard	w.o.
1907	(United States) Frederick Gresham Pollard	(United States) Richard Hooker	w.o.
1908	(United States) Robert L. James	(United States) Frederick Gresham Pollard	w.o.
1909	(United States) Richard H. Palmer	(United States) Robert L. James	7–5, 6–3, 6–3.
1910	(United States) Richard H. Palmer (2)	(United States) Frank J. Hall	6–3, 1–6, 6–3.
1911	(United States) Theodore Pell	(United States) Richard H. Palmer	6–2, 4–6, 6–2, 4–6, 6–3.
1912	(United States) Nat Thornton	(United States) Theodore Pell	w.o.
1914	(United States) Theodore Pell (2)	(United States) Nat Thornton	6–4, 6–2, 6–4.
1915	(United States) Theodore Pell (3)	(United States) Carlton Y. Smith	6–2, 6–1, 6–3.
1916	(United States) Edward H. Whitney	(United States) Theodore Pell	w.o.
1917	(United States) William Erskine Buford	(United States) Edward H. Whitney	w.o.
1919	(Japan) Ichiya Kumagae	(United States) Hugh Grigsby Whitehead	6–0, 6–1, 6–1.
1920	(United States) Percy Lloyd Kynaston	(Japan) Ichiya Kumagae	w.o.
1923	(United States) John Temple Graves Jr.	(United States) Thomas J. Mangan	4–6, 6–2, 6–4, 5–7, 6–1.
1925	(United States) Edward Jacobs	(United States) John Temple Graves Jr.	6–1, 6–2, 2–6, 8–6.
1931	(United States) Julius Seligson	(United States) Herbert Bowman	6–4, 6–1, 2–6, 6–3.
1932	(United States) Herbert Bowman	(United States) Alex Keles	6–0, 6–2, 6–2.
1933	(United States) Herbert Bowman (2)	(Cuba) Lorenzo Nodarse	3–6, 6–1, 6–3, 7–5.
1934	(United States) Harold Turner MacGuffin	(United States) Alphonso Smith	4–6, 6–1, 6–3, 7–5.
1936	(United States) Herbert Bowman (3)	(United States) Harold Turner MacGuffin	6–2, 3–6, 4–6, 6–4, 4–5, ret.

=== Women's singles ===
(incomplete roll)

Year	Winners	Runners-up	Score
1905	(United States) Connie Evans	(United States) Miss Tannor	2–0 sets
1906	(United States) Connie Evans (2)	(United States) Sadie Smith	6–1, 6–3
1907	(United States) Connie Evans (3)	(United States) Bessie Upshur	6–1, 6–1
1908	(United States) Connie Evans (4)	(United States) Sophie Meredith	6–5, 6–2
1909	(United States) Hildegarde Turle	(United States) Connie Evans	4–6, 6–0, 6–4
1910	(United States) Connie Evans Sullivan (5)	(United States) Hildegarde Turle	8–6, 6–2
1911	(United States) Connie Evans Sullivan (6)	(United States) Sophie Meredith	6–3, 6–0
1912	(United States) Hildegarde Turle Taylor	(United States) Carrie Symington Hardy	6–4, 6–2
1913	(United States) Connie Evans Sullivan (7)	(United States) Hildegarde Turle Taylor	6–4, 13–11
1914	(United States) Marie Wagner	(United States) Connie Evans Sullivan	6–2, 6–3
1915	(United States) Florence Ballin	(United States) Elisabeth Moore	2–6, 6–4, 6–1
1916	(Norway) Molla Bjurstedt	(United States) Florence Ballin	6–2, 6–2
1917	(United States) Elizabeth Warren	(United States) Penelope Anderson	6–2, 1–6, 6–4
1918	No women's event held		
1919	(United States) Marie Wagner (2)	(United States) Elisabeth Moore	6–3, 6–1
1920	(United States) Marie Wagner (3)	(United States) Penelope Anderson	6–1, 6–1
1921	(United States) Marie Wagner (4)	(United States) Florence Ballin	6–3, 6–1
1922	(United States) Mrs Winifred Ellis	(United States) Elizabeth Warren	6–2, 6–4
1923	(United States) Penelope Anderson	(United States) Mrs Winifred Ellis	6–2, 6–4
1925	(United States) Miss Wakeford	(United States) Miss Heyel	6–3, 6–4
1927	(United States) Marion Zinderstein Jessup	(United States) Penelope Anderson	6–3, 6–3
1930	(United States) Penelope Anderson (3)	(United States) Mrs W. Parrish	6–4, 6–2
1931	(United States) Penelope Anderson (4)	(United States) Alice Deford	6–0, 6–2
1934	(United States) Reba Kirson	(United States) Louise Rogerson	6–4, 6–2
1935	(United States) Mary Cootes	(United States) Reba Kirson	6–3, 6–4
1936	(United States) Edith Clarke	(United States) Mary Cootes	6–4, 6–4
