= 1922 U.S. National Championships – Women's singles =

Women's singles
- 1922 U.S. National Championships

Final
- Champion: (United States) Molla Mallory
- Runner-up: (United States) Helen Wills
- Score: 6–3, 6–1

Details
- Draw: 64

Events
| Singles | men | women |
| Doubles | men | women |
| ← 1921 · | U.S. National Championships | · 1923 → |

First-seeded Molla Mallory defeated Helen Wills 6–3, 6–1 in the final to win the women's singles tennis title at the 1922 U.S. National Championships. The event was held at the West Side Tennis Club, Forest Hills, New York City. It was Mallory's seventh U.S. National singles title. Mallory won the tournament without losing a set.

== Draw ==
=== Final eight ===
Quarterfinals
(United States) May Sutton Bundy | 12 | 4 | 6
(United States) Martha Bayard | 10 | 6 | 0
(United States) Marion Jessup | 6 | 4 | 2
(United States) Helen Wills | 2 | 6 | 6
(United States) Molla Mallory | 6 | 6
(United States) Edith Sigourney | 0 | 1
(United States) Leslie Bancroft | 8 | 6
(United States) Clare Cassel | 6 | 2

Semifinals
(United States) May Sutton Bundy | 4 | 3
(United States) Helen Wills | 6 | 6
(United States) Molla Mallory | 6 | 6
(United States) Leslie Bancroft | 0 | 4

Finals
(United States) Helen Wills | 3 | 1
(United States) Molla Mallory | 6 | 6

| Preceded by 1922 Wimbledon Championships – Women's singles | Grand Slam women's singles | Succeeded by 1923 Australasian Championships – Women's singles |
