= Cecil Textbook of Medicine =

Medical textbook

Cecil Textbook of Medicine Goldman-Cecil Medicine
- Language: English
- Subject: Medicine
- Genre: Reference
- Publisher: Elsevier (Saunders)
- Publication date: 1927 (1st edition); 2015 (25th edition); 2023 (27th edition)
- Pages: 3,024 (25th edition); 3,040 (27th edition)
- ISBN: 978-1455750177

The Cecil Textbook of Medicine (sometimes called Cecil Medicine or Goldman-Cecil Medicine) is a medical textbook published by Elsevier under the Saunders imprint.

It was first published in 1927 as the Textbook of Medicine, by Russell LaFayette Cecil. In the United States, it is a prominent and widely consulted medical textbook. Cecil Medicine is often compared with Harrison's Principles of Internal Medicine, which it predates by three decades. Approximately one third of its authors are changed with each new edition.

== History ==
It was first edited by Russell LaFayette Cecil. It is now in its 27th edition.

== See also ==
- Lee Goldman
