= 1922 U.S. National Championships (tennis) =

- Date: August - September 16 (M); August 14–19 (W)
- Edition: 42nd
- Category: Grand Slam (ITF)
- Surface: Grass
- Location: Philadelphia, Pennsylvania (MS); Forest Hills, New York (WS, WD); Chestnut Hill, Massachusetts (MD, XD)
- Venue: Germantown Cricket Club (MS); West Side Tennis Club (WS, WD); Longwood Cricket Club (MD, XD)

Champions

Men's singles
- (United States) Bill Tilden

Women's singles
- (United States) Molla Mallory

Men's doubles
- (United States) Bill Tilden / (United States) Vincent Richards

Women's doubles
- (United States) Marion Zinderstein Jessup / (United States) Helen Wills

Mixed doubles
- (United States) Molla Mallory / (United States) Bill Tilden
- U.S. National Championships

The 1922 U.S. National Championships (now known as the US Open) was a tennis tournament that took place on the outdoor grass courts at the Germantown Cricket Club in Philadelphia, Pennsylvania. The women's tournament was held from August 14 until August 19 while the men's tournament ran from August until September 16. It was the 42nd staging of the U.S. National Championships and the second Grand Slam tennis event of the year.

== Finals ==
=== Men's singles ===
(United States) Bill Tilden defeated (United States) Bill Johnston 4–6, 3–6, 6–2, 6–3, 6–4

=== Women's singles ===
(United States) Molla Mallory defeated (United States) Helen Wills 6–3, 6–1

=== Men's doubles ===
(United States) Bill Tilden / (United States) Vincent Richards defeated (Australia) Gerald Patterson / (Australia) Pat O'Hara Wood 4–6, 6–1, 6–3, 6–4

=== Women's doubles ===
(United States) Marion Zinderstein / (United States) Helen Wills defeated (United States) Edith Sigourney / (United States) Molla Mallory 6–4, 7–9, 6–3

=== Mixed doubles ===
(United States) Molla Mallory / (United States) Bill Tilden defeated (United States) Helen Wills / (United States) Howard Kinsey 6–4, 6–3

Preceded by 1922 Wimbledon Championships	Grand Slams	Succeeded by 1922 Australasian Championships
