= 1926 U.S. National Championships (tennis) =

- Date: September 13–18 (M); August 16–23 (W)
- Edition: 46th
- Category: Grand Slam (ITF)
- Surface: Grass
- Location: Forest Hills, Queens; New York City, New York
- Venue: West Side Tennis Club

Champions

Men's singles
- (France) René Lacoste

Women's singles
- (United States) Molla Bjurstedt Mallory

Men's doubles
- (United States) Richard Norris Williams / (United States) Vincent Richards

Women's doubles
- (United States) Elizabeth Ryan / (United States) Eleanor Goss

Mixed doubles
- (United States) Elizabeth Ryan / (France) Jean Borotra
← 1925 ·	U.S. National Championships	· 1927 →

The 1926 U.S. National Championships (now known as the US Open) was a tennis tournament that took place on the outdoor grass courts at the West Side Tennis Club, Forest Hills in New York City, New York. The women's tournament was held from August 16 until August 23 while the men's tournament ran from September 13 until September 18. It was the 46th staging of the U.S. National Championships and the fourth Grand Slam tennis event of the year.

== Champions ==
=== Men's singles ===
(France) René Lacoste defeated (France) Jean Borotra 6–4, 6–0, 6–4

=== Women's singles ===
(United States) Molla Bjurstedt Mallory defeated (United States) Elizabeth Ryan 4–6, 6–4, 9–7

=== Men's doubles ===
(United States) Richard Norris Williams / (United States) Vincent Richards defeated (United States) Bill Tilden / (United States) Alfred Chapin 6–4, 6–8, 11–9, 6–3

=== Women's doubles ===
(United States) Elizabeth Ryan / (United States) Eleanor Goss defeated (United States) Mary K. Browne / (United States) Charlotte Chapin 3–6, 6–4, 12–10

=== Mixed doubles ===
(United States) Elizabeth Ryan / (France) Jean Borotra defeated (United States) Hazel Hotchkiss Wightman / (France) René Lacoste 6–4, 7–5

Preceded by 1926 Wimbledon Championships	Grand Slams	Succeeded by 1927 Australian Championships
