= National Consumer Panel =

American market research panel

National Consumer Panel (NCP) is a service provided by a joint venture between NielsenIQ and Circana (formerly IRI / SymphonyIRI Group) where members in the contiguous United States scan the barcodes on all their purchases with either a mobile app or a special barcode reader and provide additional details about their shopping purchase experience(s). The NCP program was formerly known as the Homescan Consumer Panel before the formation of the joint venture with IRI and the merger of the two companies' existing panels.

The store, price, quantity, and special deals have to be entered manually for the scanned products, and the information is transmitted weekly to the company. The company used this information to calculate measures such as market penetration, average weight of purchase and loyalty for its manufacturing clients. In return for scanning services, participants earn "rewards points".
