= Horace L. Friess =

American ethicist

- Born: March 4, 1900; New York City, U.S.
- Died: October 12, 1975 (aged 75); New York City, U.S.
- Education: Columbia University
- Occupation: Ethicist
- Employer: Columbia University
- Spouse: Ruth Adler
- Relatives: Felix Adler (father-in-law); Constance Friess Holman (sister)

Horace L. Friess (March 4, 1900 – October 12, 1975) was an American ethicist. He was the Joseph L. Buttenwieser Professor of Human Relations at Columbia University, and a Guggenheim Fellow.

== Early life ==
Friess was born on March 4, 1900, in New York City. He attended Columbia University, where he earned a bachelor's degree in 1918 and a PhD in 1926. At Columbia, Friess was a member of the Philolexian Society.

== Career ==
Friess joined the Department of Philosophy and Religion at his alma mater, Columbia University, as a faculty member in 1919. He was a Guggenheim Fellow in 1942. He was the department chair from 1962 to 1964, and the Joseph L. Buttenwieser Professor of Human Relations from 1964 to 1966, when he retired.

Friess was the head of the New York Society for Ethical Culture, founded by his father-in-law. He translated from German into English a book by Friedrich Schleiermacher, and he co-authored another book with Herbert Schneider. He edited The Review of Religion for 15 years.

== Personal life and death ==
Friess married Ruth Adler, the daughter of ethicist Felix Adler. They resided in Manhattan.

Friess died on October 12, 1975, in New York City.

== Selected works ==
- Friess, Horace L., ed. (1926). Schleiermacher's Soliloquies. Chicago: Open Court Publishing Company. ISBN 9781579108557. OCLC 50447269.
- Friess, Horace L.; Schneider, Herbert (1932). Religion in Various Cultures. New York: H. Holt and Company. OCLC 2027788.
