= CipherLab =

CipherLab is a company that designs, manufactures and markets automatic identification and data capture (AIDC) products and systems. The company's mobile computers and barcode scanners are integrated into the networks of government and logistics installations worldwide, as well as grocery, manufacturing, retail, distribution, agricultural and healthcare companies. Headquartered in Taipei, Taiwan with North American headquarters in Plano, Texas, and operations in Europe, the Middle East and Africa (EMEA), the Americas, Asia-Pacific and China, CipherLab is publicly traded on the Taiwan Stock Exchange (Taiwan OTC:6160).

== History ==
CipherLab was founded in 1988 when it built the first real-time feedback system for the Taiwan Stock Exchange.

== Products and services ==
The company offers a broad range of mobile computers, scanners, fixed terminals and software for all facets of AIDC. CipherLab products incorporate Wi-Fi, RFID, GSM/GPRS, EDGE, and linear imaging or laser scanning.

CipherLab's products are used by customers worldwide, including AC Nielsen, the national postal services in Brazil and Poland, PayPoint, Wal-mart, IKEA, Chrome Hearts, Associated Grocers of the South and Circus Circus Las Vegas hotel and casino.

=== Partial list of products ===
- CipherLab makes mobile handheld computers for business use in logistics, transportation, warehousing, route accounting, direct store delivery, field service, and sales.
- CipherLab manufactures bluetooth and tethered scanners that provide a means to automate inventory management and point of sale.
- CipherLab’s fixed data terminals are used for data capture for integrated business security, employee activity logging and business operation tracking.

== See also ==
- List of companies of Taiwan
