= Reuben A. Holden III =

American tennis player

- Born: March 14, 1890; Cincinnati, Ohio, U.S.
- Died: February 27, 1967 (aged 76)
- Spouse: Grace Morgan
- Children: 2
- Tennis career
- College: Yale University

Reuben Andrus Holden III (March 14, 1890, in Cincinnati, Ohio - February 27, 1967), was a tennis player during the early part of the 20th century.

== Career ==
Holden played on the Yale University tennis team, a tennis powerhouse in those years along with Harvard, Princeton and the University of Pennsylvania. In 1910, at the age of 20, Holden won the National Intercollegiate title for Yale, defeating R. Thayer of Pennsylvania in the first round, Cullen Thomas of Princeton in the second, S. F. Raleigh of Princeton in semis and Arthur Sweetser of Harvard in the final. All matches were best of five, and Holden lost one set during the entire tournament. Holden was a member of the Yale class of 1911 and the Wolf's Head senior society.

The week before the NCAA singles final, Sweetser reached the doubles final at the international tournament in Holden's hometown: the Cincinnati Open. Holden reached six doubles finals in Cincinnati, winning two titles—in 1912 and then again 10 years later in 1922. His last doubles final came in 1932, when Holden was age 42.

He also had success when he found himself alone on the court. He was a singles finalist in Cincinnati in the all-comers round in 1912, and reached four singles semifinals: 1908, 1910, 1912, and 1913. He lost the 1913 semifinal to William McEllroy, the eventual champion.

== Personal life ==
Holden married Grace Bushnell Morgan (born January 22, 1891, in Cincinnati) and had two sons, John Morgan Holden (1922–1995) and Reuben Andrus Holden IV (1918–1995).

In 1934, just two years after he reached his last doubles final in Cincinnati, tragedy struck the Holden home. The holiday liner SS Morro Castle, bound for home after a trip to Havana with 549 passengers and crew aboard, was engulfed in flames while off the coast of New Jersey. The passenger list that night included Mr. Holden, his two sons Reuben IV and John, and his wife, Grace. Grace was among the 137 who died in the fire. Reuben IV graduated from Yale in 1940 and John, also from Yale, in 1944. Both sons were members of the Skull and Bones senior society.
