= Charlotte Hosmer Chapin =

American tennis player

- Full name: Charlotte Mary Hosmer Chapin
- Country (sports): United States
- Born: 12 December 1902 San Francisco, California
- Died: July 1970
- Plays: Right-handed

Singles

Grand Slam singles results
- US Open: SF (1927)

Doubles

Grand Slam doubles results
- US Open: F (1926)

Charlotte Mary Chapin (née Hosmer; 12 December 1902 – July 1970) was an American female tennis player who was ranked No. 3 in the United States in 1927.

She reached the final of the women's doubles competition at the 1926 U.S. National Championships (now US Open). With partner Mary K. Browne she lost the final in three sets against Eleanor Goss and Elizabeth Ryan. Her best singles performance at a Grand Slam tournament came in 1927 when she reached the semifinals at the U.S. National Championships which she lost in three sets to Betty Nuthall after having defeated eight-time singles champion Molla Bjurstedt Mallory in the quarterfinal. Hosmer Chapin participated in the 1927 Wightman Cup, the team tennis competition between the United States and Great Britain. Partnering Eleanor Goss she lost her doubles match against Gwendolyn Sterry and Betty Hill in three sets.

She won the singles title at the Pacific Coast Championships in June 1923, defeating Avery Follett in a three-sets final. In 1923 and 1925 she was the singles runner-up to Helen Wills. She was also runner-up to Wills in the 1923 California State Championships. Hosmer Chapin won the singles title at the Illinois State Championships in July 1925 after a win in three sets in the final against 16-year old Helen Jacobs. At the Eastern Grass Court Championships she was the finalist at the first two editions, in 1927 and 1928, losing the final to Molla Bjurstedt Mallory and May Sutton Bundy respectively.

On January 18, 1926, she married tennis player Alfred H. Chapin Jr. in San Francisco.

== Grand Slam finals ==
=== Doubles (1 runner-up) ===
Result	Year	Championship	Surface	Partners	Opponents	Score
Loss	1926	U.S. Championships	Grass	(United States) Mary K. Browne	(United States) Eleanor Goss (United States) Elizabeth Ryan	6–3, 4–6, 10–12
