= Ichiya Kumagae =

Japanese tennis player (1890–1968)

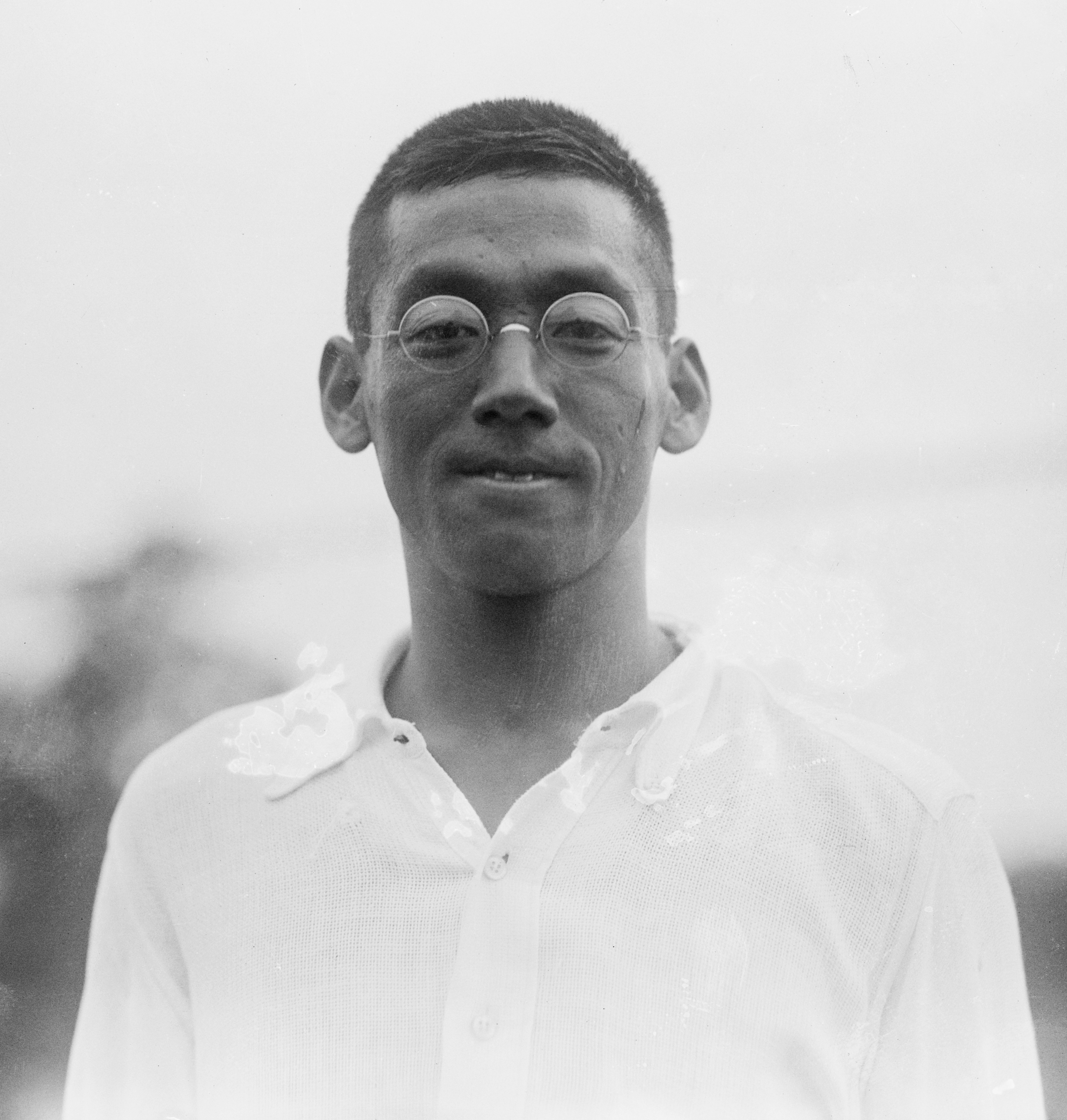
- Kumagae in 1916
- Country (sports): Japan
- Born: 10 September 1890 Ōmuta, Fukuoka, Japan
- Died: 16 August 1968 (aged 77) Ōmuta, Fukuoka, Japan
- Height: 1.66 m (5 ft 5 1/2 in)
- Turned pro: 1913 (amateur tour)
- Retired: 1921
- Plays: Left-handed (1-handed backhand)
- College: Keio University

Singles
- Career record: 165–21 (88.7%)
- Career titles: 21
- Highest ranking: 5 (1920)

Grand Slam singles results
- US Open: SF (1918)

Team competitions
- Davis Cup: F (1921^{Ch})
Medal record
Olympic Games – Tennis
Silver medal – second place	1920 Antwerp	Singles
Silver medal – second place	1920 Antwerp	Doubles

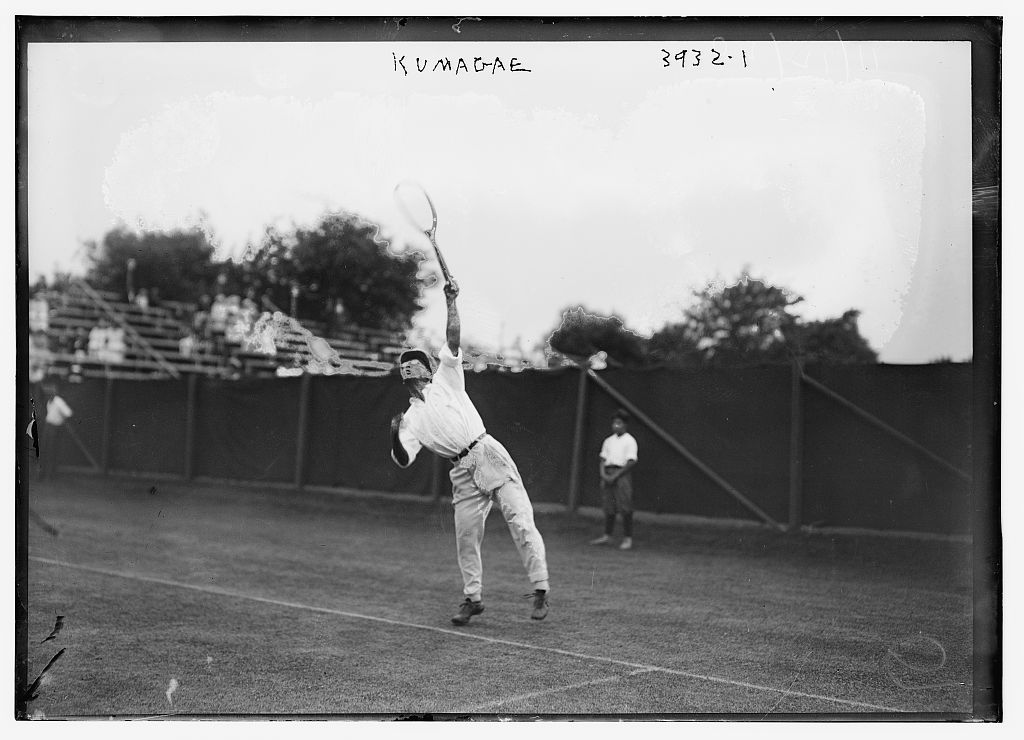
Ichiya Kumagae serving

Ichiya "Ichy" Kumagae (熊谷 一弥, Kumagai Ichiya; 10 September 1890 – 16 August 1968) was a Japanese tennis player and the first Japanese Olympic medalist.

== Career ==
Kumagae was born on 10 September 1890 in Ōmuta, Fukuoka Prefecture. He attended Keio University. In 1913, he, along with other members of the Keio University Tennis Club, pushed for the abandonment of soft tennis (which had been introduced into Japan in 1878) in favor of lawn tennis, which was popular internationally. Kumagae was sent to play in the 1913 Far Eastern Games held in Manila, marking the first overseas competition for a Japanese tennis player. He reached the singles semi-finals and the doubles finals, and his form was subsequently influenced by United States champion Bill Johnson, whose short stature had earned him the moniker "Little Bill".

Kumagae went on to win both singles and doubles at the 1915 Far Eastern Games in Shanghai. In 1916, he travelled to the United States with Hachishiro Mikami to compete in the U.S. National Championships, marking the first participation of a Japanese in one of the Grand Slam tournaments. Kumagae spent a total of three months in the United States, during which he competed in 60 matches. He won the singles title at the Newport Casino Invitational, defeating Bill Johnston, the 1915 U.S. National champion, in the final in five sets. He did not lose a single match on a clay court, and lost only four matches on grass courts, rising to the U.S. rank of No. 5. Kumagae would go on to reach as high as No. 3 in the U.S. rankings in 1919.

After his return to Japan, Kumagae graduated from Keio University and went to work for Mitsubishi Bank, who sent him to work at the bank's New York branch. He continued to play tennis, and advanced to the semi-finals at the 1918 U.S. National Championships, but lost to local favorite and seven-time winner Bill Tilden in three straight sets. In 1919 Kumagae won the New York State Championships and the Great Lakes championship, played in Buffalo, defeating Bill Tilden in the final of the latter.

Kumagae is best known for his two Olympic silver medals at the 1920 Antwerp Olympics, marking the first Olympic medals won by any Japanese athlete. In the men's singles event at the Antwerp Olympics, Kumagae lost to South African Louis Raymond in the final, 7–5, 4–6, 5–7, 4–6. With his partner Seiichiro Kashio in the doubles event, he lost to Oswald Turnbull and Maxwell Woosnam of Great Britain for the gold medal match, 2–6, 7–5, 5–7, 5–7.

Kumagae was Japan's first Davis Cup captain, including the runner-up finish in 1921. Kumagae returned to Japan in 1922.

He withdrew from the Davis Cup qualification matches in 1922, citing his age, and in 1924 published a book on tennis. He also served as a tennis instructor to Princess Nagako, the future Empress Kojun.

Following World War II, Kumagae was asked to coach the Japan National Team, which travelled to Louisville, Kentucky for a tournament in 1951. He wrote a technical manual on tennis in 1953. Kumagae died at his hometown of Ōmuta, Fukuoka on 16 August 1968.

== Career Finals (25) ==
=== Titles (21) ===
(Incomplete list)

- 1915 - Far East Championships
- 1916 - Newport Casino Invitational
- 1916 - Orient Championship
- 1918 - New York Metropolitan Grass Court Championships
- 1918 - New York State Championships
- 1918 - Ontario Championships
- 1919 - Amackassin Club Invitation
- 1919 - Brooklyn Invitation
- 1919 - Great Lakes Championships
- 1919 - New York State Championships
- 1919 - Niagara International Tournament
- 1919 - Old Dominion Championship
- 1920 - Chevy Chase Club Invitation
- 1920 - Eastern New York Clay Court Championships
- 1920 - Florida State Championships
- 1920 - New York Metropolitan Grass Court Championships
- 1921 - Greenbrier Spring Tournament
- 1921 - United North & South Championship

=== Runner-Up (4) ===
- 1919 - Harlem T.C. Invitation
- 1920 - Old Dominion Championship
- 1920 - New England Championships
- 1921 - Orange Invitation
