= Frank T. Anderson =

American tennis player

- Full name: Frank T. Anderson
- Country (sports): USA
- Born: 1902 Brooklyn, New York, USA
- Died: January 20, 1979 (Age 77)
- Retired: 1925

Singles
- Career titles: 11

Grand Slam singles results
- US Open: QF (1923)

Frank T. Anderson (1902 – January 20, 1979) was an American tennis player in the years after World War 1. He was the holder of 11 men's singles titles over the course of his sporting career.

== Biography ==
Anderson began making waves as a young tennis star in 1919.

Frank T. Anderson was the son of tennis player Fred Anderson. Frank's brother Fred was also a tennis player.

Anderson attended Commercial High School in Brooklyn, New York, where he gained recognition as one of the top tennis players to hail from the city. After graduation he played out of the Kings County Tennis Club of Brooklyn.

Anderson was the back-to-back New York city Junior Metropolitan Tennis champion in 1918 and 1919.

At age 17, Frank served for the match and had match point against Bill Tilden in the semi finals of the US indoors in 1919 in "the most terrific match ever seen on the courts of the Seventh Regiment Armory", but after missing a shot that would have given him victory, lost the long match to Tilden.

Anderson attended Columbia University in New York City, where he was a member of the school's tennis team.

Anderson won the Brooklyn championships in 1920 beating Frank Hunter in the final after coming from 5-2 down in the fifth set to win five straight games. Frank beat his brother Fred in straight sets of the final of the US indoors in 1921. Both brothers were "forcing the attack at the net at every opportunity and engaging in one close-range volleying duel after another". Partnering his father Fred, Anderson won the Canadian championship doubles title in 1922.

He also won the singles title beating Robert Baird of Toronto, in a match in which "the superior speed of the younger man" proved decisive. At the 1923 US Championships, Anderson overcame veteran former finalist Nat Niles in the opening round in a long five set match. "Anderson was putting all he had into his service and volleying, yet it seemed at times that the skill born of long experience that was the Londwood veteran's would triumph. Frank only drove the harder when he was threatened, and came through". Anderson lost to Bill Johnston in the quarter finals.

After his retirement in 1925, Anderson worked as a tennis promoter, working for S. Howard Voshell and Frank Hunter on the world championship tour of English professional Fred Perry and Californian Ellsworth Vines in 1937.

Anderson moved to St. Cloud, Florida in 1957, where he entered the newspaper business. He worked as a correspondent for the Osceola Sentinel and the Orlando Sentinel Star before being named the editor of the St. Cloud News.

Anderson died January 20, 1979, at the age of 77.
