= Robert Kinsey =

American tennis player

- Country (sports): United States; Mexico
- Born: 9 May 1897
- Died: 18 September 1964 (aged 67)
- Plays: Right-handed (one-handed backhand)

Singles

Grand Slam singles results
- US Open: QF (1921, 1923)

Mixed doubles

Grand Slam mixed doubles results
- US Open: W (1924)

Team competitions

Robert Gladstone Kinsey (May 9, 1897 – September 18, 1964) was an American male tennis player.

In 1921, Kinsey reached the quarter finals of the US championships. He reached the quarters again in 1923 (beating twice former finalist Wallace Johnson in round one before losing to Frank Hunter). In 1924, he won the U.S. National Championship men's doubles championship with his brother Howard Kinsey by defeating the Australian team of Gerald Patterson and Pat O'Hara in four sets.

Kinsey represented Mexico in the Davis Cup, competing in three ties between 1927 and 1929.

== Grand Slam finals ==
=== Doubles: (1 title) ===
Result	Year	Championship	Surface	Partner	Opponents	Score
Win	1924	U.S. National Championships	Grass	(United States) Howard Kinsey	(Australia) Pat O'Hara Wood (Australia) Gerald Patterson	7–5, 5–7, 7–9, 6–3, 6–4
