= Arthur Nielsen =

American market researcher (1897–1980)

- Born: Arthur Charles Nielsen; September 5, 1897; Chicago, Illinois, U.S.
- Died: June 1, 1980 (aged 82); Chicago, Illinois, U.S.
- Education: University of Wisconsin–Madison
- Occupation: Electrical engineer
- Known for: Founding A.C. Nielsen Company and starting Nielsen ratings
- Spouse: Gertrude Nielsen
- Children: Arthur Nielsen Jr.

Arthur Charles Nielsen Sr. (September 5, 1897 – June 1, 1980) was an American businessman, electrical engineer and market research analyst who created and tracked the Nielsen ratings for television as founder of the A.C. Nielsen Company.

== Background ==
Nielsen was born in Chicago, Illinois. Nielsen was educated at the University of Wisconsin–Madison, where he received a B.S., summa cum laude in electrical engineering in 1918. He was a member of Tau Beta Pi (engineering honor society), the Sigma Phi Society and a captain of the varsity tennis team from 1916 to 1918. He subsequently served in the U.S. Naval Reserve.

== Career ==
Nielsen worked as an electrical engineer for the Isko Company from 1919 to 1920 and for the H. P. Gould Company, both in Chicago, from 1920 to 1923. He founded the ACNielsen company in 1923, and in doing so advanced the new field of market research. This involved: (1.) test marketing new products to determine their viability prior to costly mass marketing and production; and (2.) measuring product sales at a random sample of stores to determine market share. Careful statistical sampling was crucial to this process. The techniques developed by Nielsen were especially important for the efficient operation of a market prior to the introduction of computerized digital networks that in the 1990s enabled continuous and comprehensive monitoring of sales by product retailers. Nielsen was also a pioneer in developing methods of measuring the audience of radio and television broadcasting programs, in particular, the Nielsen ratings.

Nielsen inaugurated a National Radio Index for broadcasters and advertisers in 1942, followed by a television ratings service in 1950. By the time of his death, the company's revenue was US$398 million annually.

== Personal life ==
With his son Arthur Nielsen Jr. he won the U.S. Father and Son doubles tennis titles in 1946 and 1948. He was elected to the International Tennis Hall of Fame in 1971 for his contributions to the sport. The University of Wisconsin awarded him an honorary Doctor of Science (ScD) in 1974. Nielsen was appointed a Knight of the Order of the Dannebrog, Ridder af Dannebrog (1961) by the king of Denmark.

Nielsen and his wife Gertrude (also a Wisconsin grad; d.1998) donated the Nielsen Tennis Stadium to the University of Wisconsin–Madison. In 1990, the A.C. Nielsen family made a donation to UW–Madison to establish the A.C. Nielsen Center for Marketing Analytics and Insights, which provides MBA, MS, and certificate programs in marketing research, consumer insights, and analytics. It is the only full-time market research program in the United States. A small tennis center in Winnetka, Illinois, is named after him.

=== Arthur C. Nielsen Jr. ===
Nielsen's oldest son had four siblings. He graduated from the University of Wisconsin and married Patricia McKnew; the couple had two sons, Arthur II and Chris, and a daughter. Arthur Jr. died in 2011, and his wife in 2005. They had seven grandchildren. Arthur Charles Nielsen Jr. was described by The New York Times as having institutionalized his father's innovations, including "urging" the company to purchase a $150,000 Univac computer in 1948.

== Professional recognition ==
- Annual Advertisement Awards Committee, 1936
- Chicago Federated Advertisements Club, 1941
- American Marketing Association, 1951 and 1970
- Hall of Fame in Distribution in 1953
- International Advertisement Association, 1966
