= Vincent Richards =

American tennis player (1903–1959)

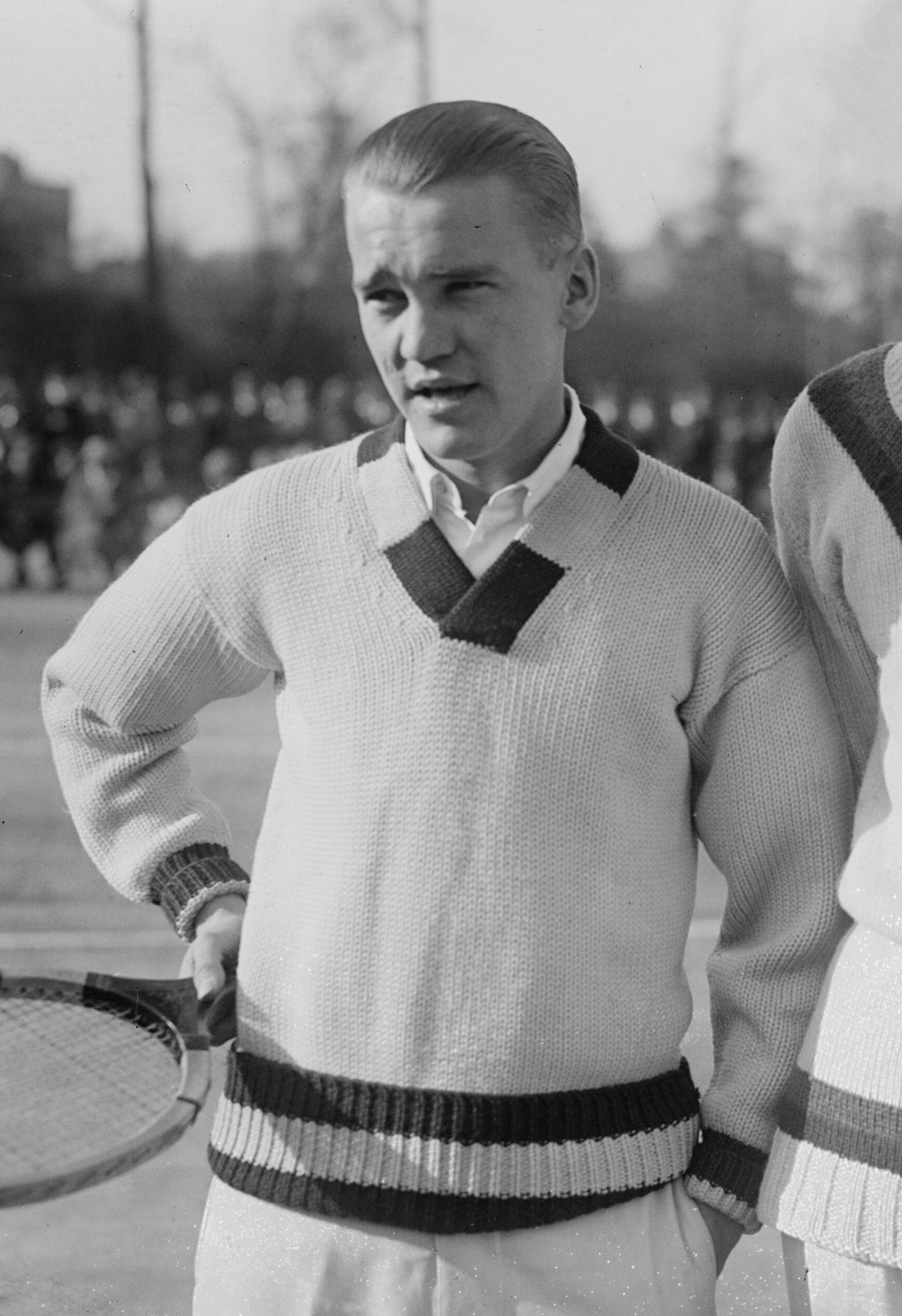
- Richards at the 1922 Davis Cup
- Country (sports): United States
- Born: March 20, 1903 Yonkers, New York, U.S.
- Died: September 28, 1959 (aged 56) New York City, U.S.
- Height: 5 ft 10 in (178 cm)
- Turned pro: 1926
- Retired: 1951
- Plays: Right-handed (one-handed backhand)
- Int. Tennis HoF: 1961 (member page)

Singles
- Career record: 472-154 (75.4%)
- Career titles: 46
- Highest ranking: No. 1 (1927, Ray Bowers)

Grand Slam singles results
- French Open: SF (1926)
- Wimbledon: QF (1924)
- US Open: SF (1922, 1924, 1925, 1926)

Other tournaments
- Professional majors
- US Pro: W (1927, 1928, 1930, 1933)

Doubles
- Career record: no value

Grand Slam doubles results
- French Open: W (1926)
- Wimbledon: W (1924); F (1926)
- US Open: W (1918, 1921, 1922, 1925, 1926); F (1919)

Grand Slam mixed doubles results
- US Open: W (1919, 1924); F (1925)
Medal record
Olympic Games – Tennis
Gold medal – first place	1924 Paris	Singles
Gold medal – first place	1924 Paris	Doubles
Silver medal – second place	1924 Paris	Mixed doubles

Vincent Richards (March 20, 1903 – September 28, 1959) was an American tennis player. He was active in the early decades of the 20th century, particularly known as being a superlative volleyer. He was ranked World No. 2 as an amateur in 1924 by A. Wallis Myers, and was ranked joint World No. 1 pro by Ray Bowers in 1927 and World No. 1 pro by Bowers in 1930.

== Biography ==
Born in Yonkers, New York, he attended the Jesuit Fordham Preparatory School, attended Fordham University and studied at the Columbia University School of Journalism in 1922.

Richards won the National Boys Outdoor Singles Tournament in 1917. He became a protégé of Bill Tilden after being defeated by the latter in a match, and he then teamed up with him to win the United States doubles championship in 1918 at the age of 15. He remains the youngest male to have ever won a major championship. Twenty-seven years later, in 1945, he and Tilden won the United States Pro doubles title. While Bill Tilden teamed with Richards to win titles together, he was beaten by Richards in both singles and doubles, including for several major titles. During their long rivalry, they faced each other 102 times, with Richards holding a career record of 52–50 against Tilden.

Richards retained his amateur status for 10 years because his ambition was to compete in the 1924 Olympics held in Paris, France. He realized this ambition by winning the gold medal for the United States in both singles and doubles, additionally collecting the silver medal in mixed doubles. Richards is one of two American male tennis players to win the gold medal in both singles and doubles (Beals Wright was the other), and he ranks second all-time with his three medals won in 1924 (second to Reginald Doherty of Great Britain, who won four Olympic tennis medals). Between both men and women, Richards is third behind Venus Williams in first, and Serena Williams in second, with three overall medals, with Williams collecting four gold medals over multiple Olympics. Richards was a semifinalist at the French championships in 1926, where he beat Colin Gregory and Bela Von Kehrling, then lost to Henri Cochet. He was also a semifinalist at the U.S. championships in 1922 (losing to Bill Johnston), 1924 (losing to Tilden), 1925 (where he beat René Lacoste, then lost to Tilden) and 1926 (losing to Jean Borotra). While there was no official ATP Tour in the 1920s, Richards was one of the pioneers in creating a version of a "world tennis tour", playing in the equivalent of all four grand slams during his career, additional major tournaments, and exhibition matches in front of emperors, presidents, and other heads of states. While Tilden may have overshadowed Richards, even in the Davis Cup, Richards held a perfect 5–0 record when he played for his country.

In April 1926, Richards and Tilden contested the final of the Mason & Dixon Tournament at The Greenbrier resort, with Richards winning in five sets.

Richards was one of the best singles players of the 1920s and played on several United States Davis Cup teams. In 1927 he was the first prominent male player to turn professional. In 1928, he was still generally considered to be one of the top 5 or 6 players in the world and played a brief tour at the end of the year against Czech player Karel Koželuh, another new professional. Richards only beat Koželuh five times in 20 matches. Richards won the United States Pro Championship in 1927, 1928, and 1930, beating Koželuh in the finals in both 1928 and 1930, and losing to him in the 1929 final. He lost the 1931 final to Tilden and won the U.S. Pro Championships for the last time in 1933, this time beating Frank Hunter in the final. He continued to play in the U.S. Pro championships in most years until 1946. Richards and Tilden won the doubles at the 1945 U.S. Pro championships.

Richards was inducted into the International Tennis Hall of Fame in Newport, Rhode Island in 1961.

=== Business career ===
After retiring from tennis, Richards joined the Dunlop Tire and Rubber Company as general manager of the sporting goods division and became vice president.

== Personal life ==
In February 1924, he married Claremont Gushee in Greenwich, Connecticut, and they had three children. She died in 1950. On September 28, 1959, Richards died of a heart attack at Doctors Hospital in New York.

== Major finals ==
=== Grand Slam tournaments ===
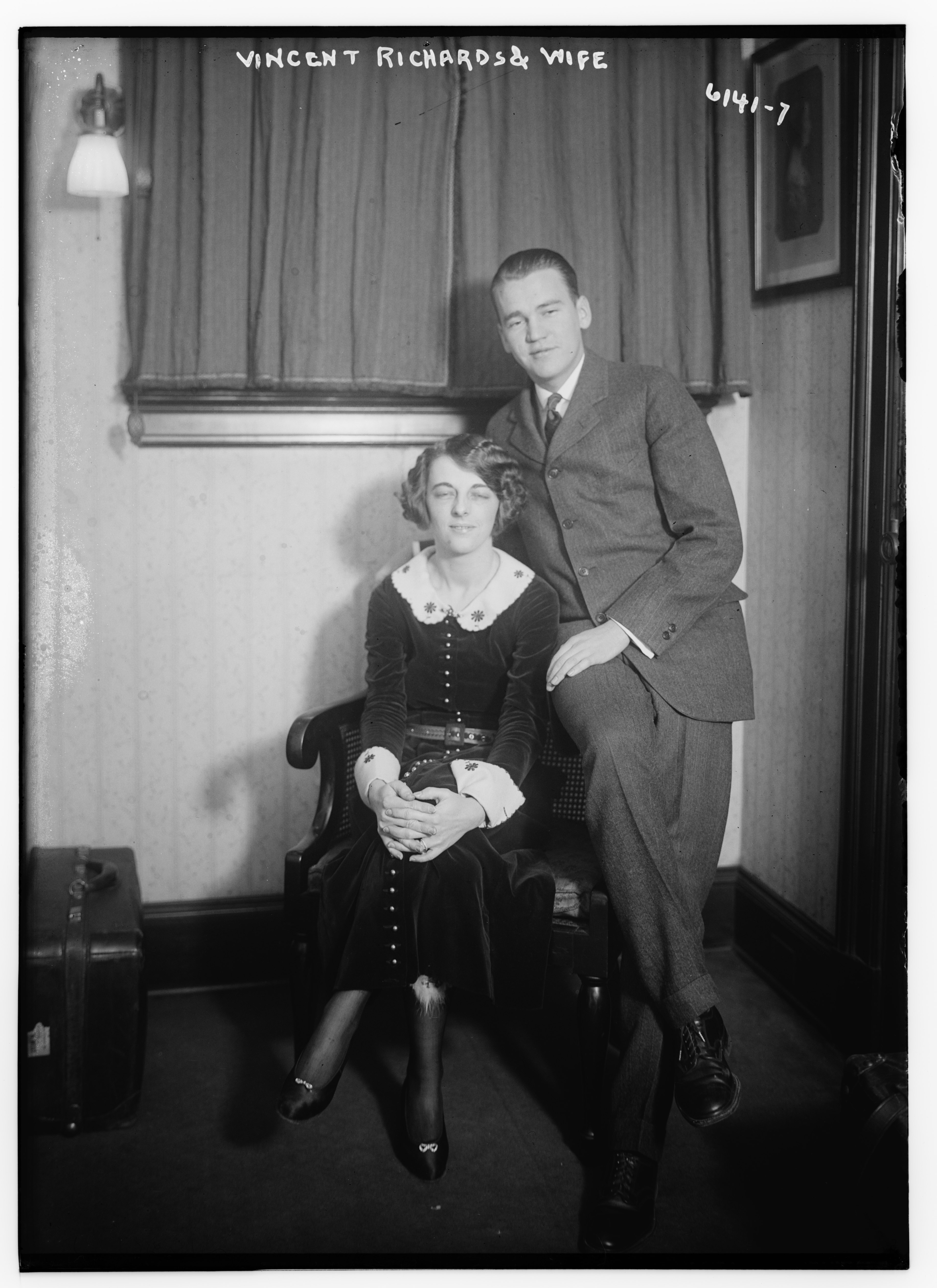
The Richards, circa 1930s

==== Doubles: 9 (7 titles, 2 runners-up) ====
Result	Year	Championship	Surface	Partner	Opponents	Score
Win	1918	U.S. National Championships	Grass	(United States) Bill Tilden	(United States) Fred Alexander (United States) Beals Wright	6–3, 6–4, 3–6, 2–6, 6–2
Loss	1919	U.S. National Championships	Grass	(United States) Bill Tilden	(Australia) Norman Brookes (Australia) Gerald Patterson	6–8, 3–6, 6–4, 6–4, 2–6
Win	1921	U.S. National Championships	Grass	(United States) Bill Tilden	(United States) Watson Washburn (United States) R. Norris Williams	13–11, 12–10, 6–1
Win	1922	U.S. National Championships	Grass	(United States) Bill Tilden	(Australia) Pat O'Hara Wood (Australia) Gerald Patterson	4–6, 6–1, 6–3, 6–4
Win	1924	Wimbledon	Grass	(United States) Frank Hunter	(United States) Watson Washburn (United States) R. Norris Williams	6–3, 3–6, 8–10, 8–6, 6–3
Win	1925	U.S. National Championships	Grass	(United States) R. Norris Williams	(Australia) John Hawkes (Australia) Gerald Patterson	6–2, 8–10, 6–4, 11–9
Win	1926	French Championships	Clay	(United States) Howard Kinsey	(France) Jacques Brugnon (France) Henri Cochet	6–4, 6–1, 4–6, 6–4
Loss	1926	Wimbledon	Grass	(United States) Howard Kinsey	(France) Jacques Brugnon (France) Henri Cochet	5–7, 6–4, 3–6, 2–6
Win	1926	U.S. National Championships	Grass	(United States) R. Norris Williams	(United States) Alfred Chapin (United States) Bill Tilden	6–4, 6–8, 11–9, 6–3

==== Mixed doubles: 3 (2 titles, 1 runner-up) ====
Result	Year	Championship	Surface	Partner	Opponents	Score
Win	1919	U.S. National Championships	Grass	(United States) Marion Zinderstein	(United States) Florence Ballin (United States) Bill Tilden	2–6, 11–9, 6–2
Win	1924	U.S. National Championships	Grass	(United States) Helen Wills	(United States) Molla Bjurstedt Mallory (United States) Bill Tilden	6–8, 7–5, 6–0
Loss	1925	U.S. National Championships	Grass	(United Kingdom) Ermyntrude Harvey	(United Kingdom) Kitty McKane (Australia) John Hawkes	2–6, 4–6

=== Pro Slam tournaments ===
==== Singles: 6 (4/2) ====
Result	Year	Championship	Surface	Opponent	Score
Win	1927	U.S. Pro	Grass	(United States) Howard Kinsey	11–9, 6–4, 6–3
Win	1928	U.S. Pro	Grass	(Czechoslovakia) Karel Koželuh	8–6, 6–3, 0–6, 6–2
Loss	1929	U.S. Pro	Grass	(Czechoslovakia) Karel Koželuh	4–6, 4–6, 6–4, 6–4, 5–7
Win	1930	U.S. Pro	Grass	(Czechoslovakia) Karel Koželuh	2–6, 10–8, 6–3, 6–4
Loss	1931	U.S. Pro	Grass	(United States) Bill Tilden	5–7, 2–6, 1–6
Win	1933	U.S. Pro	Grass	(United States) Frank Hunter	6–3, 6–0, 6–2

== Singles performance timeline ==
Richards was banned from competing in the amateur Grand Slams when he joined the professional tennis circuit in 1927.

Key
W	F	SF	QF	#R	RR	Q#	DNQ	A	NH

(W) winner; (F) finalist; (SF) semifinalist; (QF) quarterfinalist; (#R) rounds 4, 3, 2, 1; (RR) round-robin stage; (Q#) qualification round; (DNQ) did not qualify; (A) absent; (NH) not held; (SR) strike rate (events won / competed); (W–L) win–loss record.

	1918	1919	1920	1921	1922	1923	1924	1925	1926	1927	1928	1929	1930	1931	1932	1933	1934	1935	1936	1937	1938	1939	1940	1941	1942	1943	1944	1945	1946	1947	1948	1949	1950	1951	SR	W–L	Win %
Grand Slam tournaments																																			0 / 13	38–13	74.5
Australian Open	NH	A	A	A	A	A	A	A	A	A	A	A	A	A	A	A	A	A	A	A	A	A	A	Not held					A	A	A	A	A	A	0 / 0	–	–
French Open	NH	NH	Only for French players					A	SF	A	A	A	A	A	A	A	A	A	A	A	A	A	Not held						A	A	A	A	A	A	0 / 1	4–1	80.0
Wimbledon	NH	A	A	A	A	4R	QF	A	2R	A	A	A	A	A	A	A	A	A	A	A	A	A	Not held						A	A	A	A	A	A	0 / 3	48–3	72.7
US Open	3R	3R	3R	3R	SF	3R	SF	SF	SF	A	A	A	A	A	A	A	A	A	A	A	A	A	A	A	A	A	A	A	A	A	A	A	A	A	0 / 9	26–9	74.3
Pro Slam tournaments																																			4 / 19	35–15	70.0
U.S. Pro	Not held									W	W	F	W	F	QF	W	SF	A	A	QF	2R	2R	2R	2R	A	2R	NH	QF	3R	2R	A	A	1R	2R	4 / 19	35–15	70.0
French Pro	Not held												A	A	A	NH	A	A	A	A	A	A	Not held												0 / 0	–	–
Wembley Pro	Not held																A	A	NH	A	NH	A	Not held									A	A	A	0 / 0	–	–
Win–loss	1–1	1–1	3–1	2–1	5–1	5–2	8–2	4–1	9–3	3–0	4–0	3–1	6–0	5–1	1–1	4–0	2–1			0–1	1–1	0–1	1–1	1–1		0–1		2–1	1–1	0–1			0–1	1-1	4 / 32	73–28	72.2
National representation
Olympics	NH		A	NH			G	Not held																											1 / 1	6–0	100
