= Russell LaFayette Cecil =

American physician

- Russell LaFayette Cecil
- Born: 1881
- Died: June 1, 1965 (aged 83–84)
- Occupation: physician

Russell LaFayette Cecil (1881-1 June 1965), was an American physician who edited the first Cecil Textbook of Medicine in 1927.
