= Carl Fischer (tennis) =

American tennis player (1901–1985)

- Full name: Carl Henry Fischer
- Country (sports): United States
- Born: April 8, 1901 Montgomery County, Pennsylvania, United States
- Died: 1985 (aged 84) Philadelphia, Pennsylvania, United States

Grand Slam singles results
- Wimbledon: 2R (1924)
- US Open: 3R (1921, 1922, 1923, 1929)

Carl Henry Fischer (8 April 1901 – October 1985) was an American amateur tennis player.

A native of Pennsylvania, Fischer attended Lower Merion High School while growing up in Montgomery County, before further studies at the University of Pennsylvania and Philadelphia College of Osteopathic Medicine.

Fischer was active in tennis through the 1920s and 1930s. He won the 1923 U.S. intercollegiate singles championship. In 1924, Fischer competed at the Wimbledon Championships for the only time and was a quarter-finalist in the men's doubles. He was also named in the U.S. squads for the 1924 Summer Olympics and 1924 Davis Cup, but ended up withdrawing from both, over a dispute with the USLTA over whether his sports writing for a local newspaper invalided his status as an amateur. He won several titles during his career including the Middle States Championships.
