= Herbert Bowman =

American tennis player (1897–1980)

- Full name: Herbert L. Bowman
- Country (sports): USA
- Born: 21 April 1897 New York, New York, United States
- Died: 3 April 1980 (aged 82)
- Turned pro: 1915 (amateur tour)
- Retired: 1946

Singles
- Career record: 143–82
- Career titles: 40

Grand Slam singles results
- US Open: 4R (1922)

Herbert Lee Bowman (21 April 1897 – 3 April 1980) was an American tennis player in the early 20th century. In grand slam tournaments his best result came at the 1922 U.S. National Championships where he reached the fourth round before losing to Vinnie Richards. He played in over 100 tournaments, and 225 matches in singles between 1915 and 1946, and won 40 career titles.

== Career ==
Bowman was born in New York, New York, Bowman took his bachelor's degree at Cornell University in 1919. While at Cornell, he joined the Phi Kappa Psi fraternity in 1915, and through that affiliation, was a member of the Irving Literary Society.

Bowman played in his first U.S. National Championships in 1915. In 1921 he won his first title at the Quaker Ridge Invitation held at New Rochelle, New York City. He continued to play at the U.S. National Championships (today's U.S. Open) multiple times, with his best result coming at the 1922 U.S. National Championships, where he reached the fourth round, but was beaten by Vinnie Richards.

Bowman was ranked as high as No. 13 in the United States. He won the singles and doubles titles at the Tri-State Tennis Championships (now Cincinnati Masters) in 1929. He was the second oldest to win the singles title at age 32. Bill Tilden had won the title at age 33 in 1926. In 1943, Bowman won his final title at the Seventh Regiment Tennis Club tournament. In 1946, he played his final tournament at the U.S. International Indoor Championships.

His career highlights included winning the New Jersey State Championships five times (1922, 1925–1927, 1930). He won the Bermuda Championships at Hamilton, Bermuda on hard courts a record five times (1924, 1926, 1928–1930), the Quaker Ridge Invitation three times (1921, 1924, 1927), the New York State Championships two times (1922–1923), the Eastern Clay Court Championships three times (1927,1929,1930), the Seventh Regiment Indoor Championship on wood courts three times (1928, 1930, 1943), the Brooklyn Indoor (1923), the Long Island Indoor (1924), the Maryland State Championships (1922), the Atlantic Coast Championships (1927), Hudson Valley Championship (1929) and the Old Dominion Championship three times, (1932–1933, 1936) in Richmond, Virginia.

Bowman died in New York City in 1980 at the age of 83.
