= Leon De Turenne =

American tennis player

- Full name: Leon Auzias De Turenne
- Country (sports): USA
- Born: 15 December 1899 Montreal, Canada
- Died: 17 January 1957 (aged 57) Seattle, Washington, United States
- Retired: 1928

Singles
- Career titles: 4

Grand Slam singles results
- US Open: 3R (1922)

Leon De Turenne (15 December 1899 – 17 January 1957) was an American tennis player in the 1920s.

== Career ==
De Turenne was born in Montreal, Canada, in December 1899 and came to Seattle, United States, in 1908 with his family. His father Raymond de Turenne was a former Belgian consul. De Turenne was a graduate at Harvard University. In 1922 De Turenne won the Washington State championships beating Henry Van Dyke Johns in the final and the following week, he served and volleyed well in the final to beat A. S. Milne to win the B. C. Mainland Championships in Vancouver. In 1925 he won the Washington State title beating Wallace Scott in the final. In 1926 the Canadian Championships were held at Vancouver. In the semi finals, De Turenne beat former champion Leroy Rennie in four sets "through taking the net and smashing for points...Time after time he (Rennie) caught Turenne at the net and drove past him. Turenne's tremendous energy and his great ground covering, however, were not to be denied. He recovered balls that seemed good for points and in this manner negatived a lot of Rennie's efforts". The final, in which De Turenne beat Wallace Scott in three straight sets, took just fifty minutes. De Turenne didn't play for many years after that. During World War 2, De Turenne was a lieutenant in the Navy. He was president of the Yukon Investment Co. He was survived by his wife and his son.
