= Phil Neer =

American tennis player

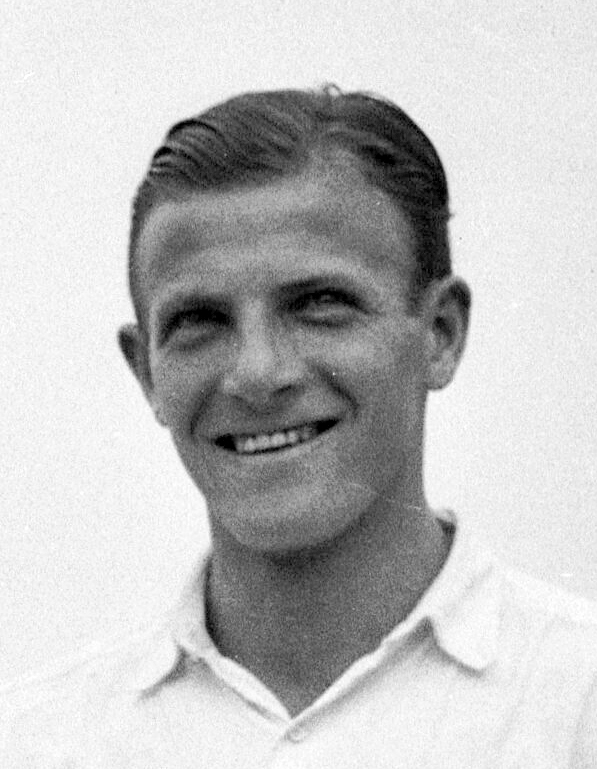
Neer in 1926

Philip F. Neer (December 24, 1901 in Portland, Oregon – December 1989) was NCAA champion and a top-ranking amateur tennis player in the 1920s.

== Early career ==
Neer, a native of Portland, was one of the first male tennis players from the west coast to achieve national tennis success. He and partner Don Gilman won the Oregon state doubles championship in 1918, and in 1919, was the national junior doubles runner-up and the Pacific Northwest singles champion. A year later, he won the British Columbia men’s singles championship and the Oregon state singles championship.

== College and senior career ==
Neer attended Stanford University and in 1921, became the first player from a western U.S. university to win the NCAA Men's Tennis Championship. A year later, Neer and partner Jim Davies won the NCAA doubles championship, the first team from a non-Ivy League school to do so.

Neer won back-to-back doubles championships at the Pacific Coast Championships in 1932 and 1933 and was runner-up in 1934. At the tournament now known as the Cincinnati Masters, Neer reached the semifinals in 1919 as a 17 year old.

On January 28, 1933, Neer, who was ranked #8 in the United States at the time, played his friend and occasional mixed doubles partner Helen Wills Moody in an exhibition match in San Francisco. Moody, who was the reigning ladies' Wimbledon champion, defeated Neer 6–3, 6–4. This match predated the Bobby Riggs-Billie Jean King "Battle of the Sexes" by 40 years.

== Honors ==
Neer was inducted into the United States Tennis Association Pacific Northwest Hall of Fame in 2003, and is a member of the Stanford Athletic Hall of Fame.

== Personal ==
Neer's brothers, Jacie and Henry, were also prominent in Portland tennis, as well as his nephew (Jacie's son) Jack Neer.
