= Howard Kinsey =

American tennis player

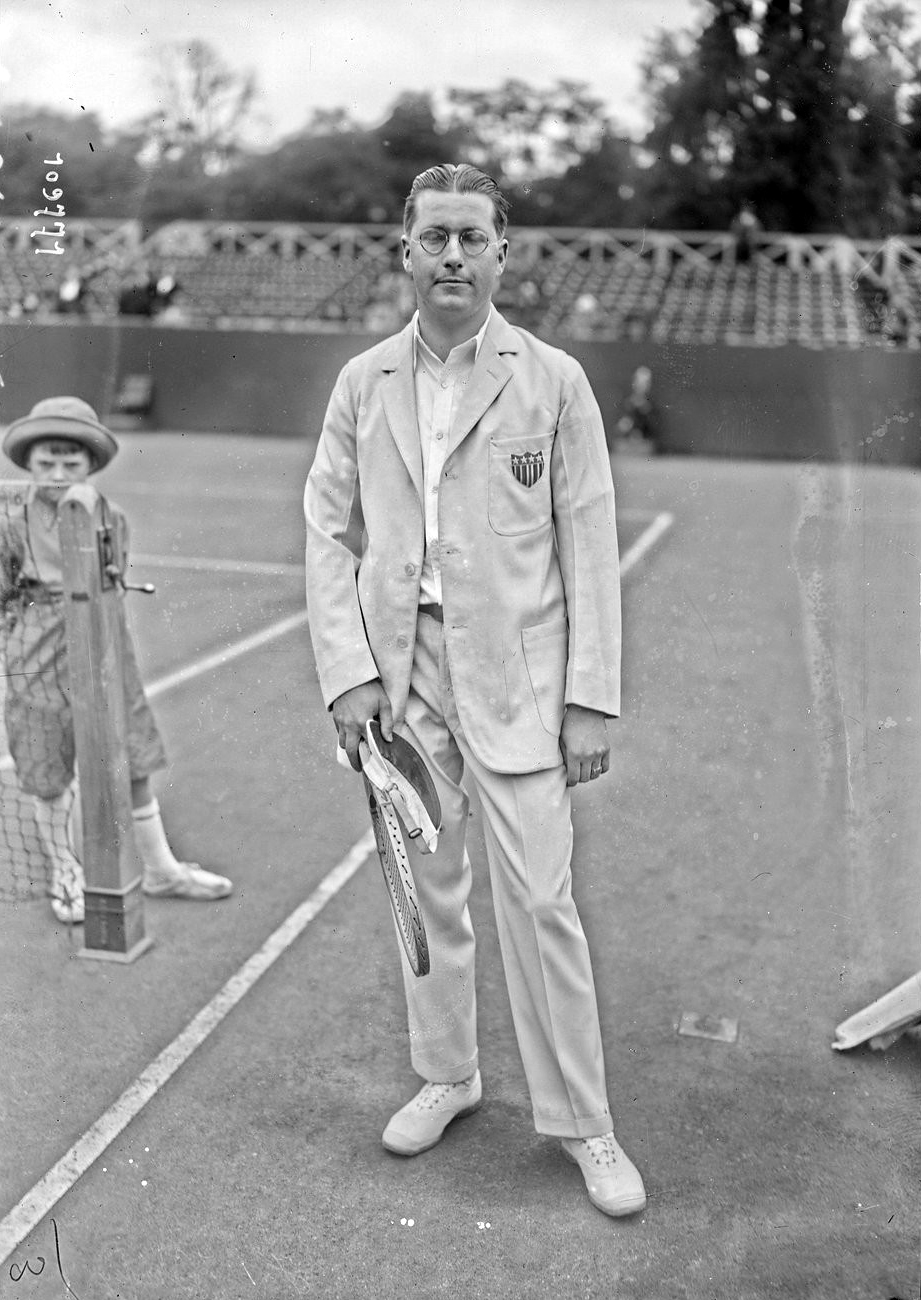
- Kinsey in Paris (1926)
- Full name: Howard Orson Kinsey
- Country (sports): United States
- Born: December 3, 1899 St. Louis, Missouri, United States
- Died: July 26, 1966 (aged 66) San Francisco, California, United States
- Turned pro: 1927 (amateur from 1920)
- Retired: 1931
- Plays: Right-handed (one-handed backhand)

Singles
- Highest ranking: No. 7 (1924, A. Wallis Myers)

Grand Slam singles results
- French Open: QF (1926)
- Wimbledon: F (1926)
- US Open: QF (1924, 1925)
- Professional majors
- US Pro: F (1927)

Doubles

Grand Slam doubles results
- French Open: W (1926)
- Wimbledon: F (1926)
- US Open: W (1924)

Grand Slam mixed doubles results
- Wimbledon: F (1926)

Howard Oreon Kinsey (December 3, 1899 – July 26, 1966) was an American tennis player in the 1920s. He was originally from St Louis.

== Playing record ==
His significant championships were the 1926 French National men's doubles championship, where he and Vincent Richards beat Henri Cochet and Jacques Brugnon (a pairing who went on to win three other French National doubles titles) in the final, and the 1924 U.S. National men's doubles championship with his brother Robert Kinsey.

Bill Tilden wrote of the pair that he had "seldom seen a team work together more smoothly than the Kinseys." In 1926, he reached the Wimbledon final, losing to Jean Borotra.

Kinsey was ranked world No. 7 in 1924 by A. Wallis Myers in his amateur rankings for The Daily Telegraph. As a pro, American Lawn Tennis Magazine ranked Kinsey as world No. 6 in 1930.

Later in 1926, he was one of the early players signed by the promoter Charles C. Pyle to play in his professional tennis league. After a split with Pyle, he joined Richards in forming an association of professional tennis players.

In 1936, he and Helen Wills Moody volleyed a tennis ball back and forth 2,001 times without missing. The feat took them 1 hour and 18 minutes. They only stopped the exchange so that Kinsey could go teach a lesson that he had scheduled.

Kinsey is a member of the USTA Northern California Hall of Fame.

== Grand Slam finals ==
=== Singles: (1 runner-up) ===
Result	Year	Championship	Surface	Opponent	Score
Loss	1926	Wimbledon	Grass	(France) Jean Borotra	6–8, 1–6, 3–6

=== Doubles: (2 titles, 1 runner-up) ===
Result	Year	Championship	Surface	Partner	Opponents	Score
Win	1924	U.S. National Championships	Grass	(United States) Robert Kinsey	(Australia) Pat O'Hara Wood (Australia) Gerald Patterson	7–5, 5–7, 7–9, 6–3, 6–4
Win	1926	French Championships	Clay	(United States) Vincent Richards	(France) Jacques Brugnon (France) Henri Cochet	6–4, 6–1, 4–6, 6–4
Loss	1926	Wimbledon	Grass	(United States) Vincent Richards	(France) Jacques Brugnon (France) Henri Cochet	5–7, 6–4, 3–6, 2–6

=== Mixed doubles (1 runner-up) ===
Result	Year	Championship	Surface	Partner	Opponents	Score
Loss	1926	Wimbledon	Grass	(United States) Mary Browne	(United Kingdom) Kitty McKane (United Kingdom) Leslie Godfree	3–6, 4–6

== See also ==
- Professional Tennis Championships
