= S. Howard Voshell =

American tennis player and promoter

- Full name: Samuel Howard Voshell
- Country (sports): United States
- Born: September 18, 1888 Boston, Massachusetts, United States
- Died: November 10, 1937 (aged 49) Queens, New York, United States
- Turned pro: 1910 (amateur tour)
- Retired: 1930

Singles

Grand Slam singles results
- US Open: SF (1918)

S. Howard Voshell (1888–1937) was an American tennis player and later a promoter. He was an insurance broker. In World War I, Voshell attained the rank of second Lieutenant in the air service. Voshell was a left-hander with a "cannon ball" serve. Voshell made his debut in the U. S. Championships in 1910 and lost his first match. He had early round losses in 1912, 1913, 1914, 1915, 1916 and 1917. In 1917 and 1918 he won the National Indoor championships. At the 1918 U. S. championships, Voshell beat 15 year old prodigy Vincent Richards and Craig Biddle before losing to Robert Lindley Murray in the semi finals. Every year from 1919 to 1926, Voshell lost early at the U. S. Championships. He retired in 1930. Voshell persuaded Fred Perry to turn pro and was co-promoter (with Frank Hunter) of the early pro matches between Perry and Vines in 1937. His health deteriorated as the year wore on and he died in November 1937 aged 49 at his home in Kew Gardens, Queens.
