= Alfred Chapin (tennis) =

American tennis player

- Full name: Alfred H. Chapin Jr.
- Country (sports): United States
- Born: July 13, 1901
- Died: January 1961 (aged 59)

Singles

Grand Slam singles results
- US Open: 4R (1924)

Doubles

Grand Slam doubles results
- US Open: F (1926)

Alfred H. Chapin Jr. (July 13, 1901 – January 1961) was an American tennis player.

Chapin grew up in Springfield, Massachusetts and was a graduate of Williams College. He reached the singles fourth round of the 1924 U.S. National Championships and made his best national ranking of 7th in 1926. His tournament finals included a straight sets win over Bill Tilden at the 1926 Connecticut Championships. He teamed up with Tilden to make the doubles final of the 1926 U.S. National Championships.

Outside of tennis, Chapin was a banker and served as director of the Western Massachusetts Bank, before relocating to California and working in floor coverings. He was married to tennis player Charlotte Hosmer.

Chapin is a member of the New England Tennis Hall of Fame.

== Grand Slam finals ==
=== Doubles (1 runner-up) ===
Result	Year	Championship	Surface	Partner	Opponents	Score
Loss	1926	U.S. Championships	Grass	(United States) Bill Tilden	(United States) Vincent Richards (United States) R. Norris Williams	4–6, 8–6, 9–11, 3–6
