= Paul Martin (illustrator) =

American commercial artist and illustrator (1883–1932)

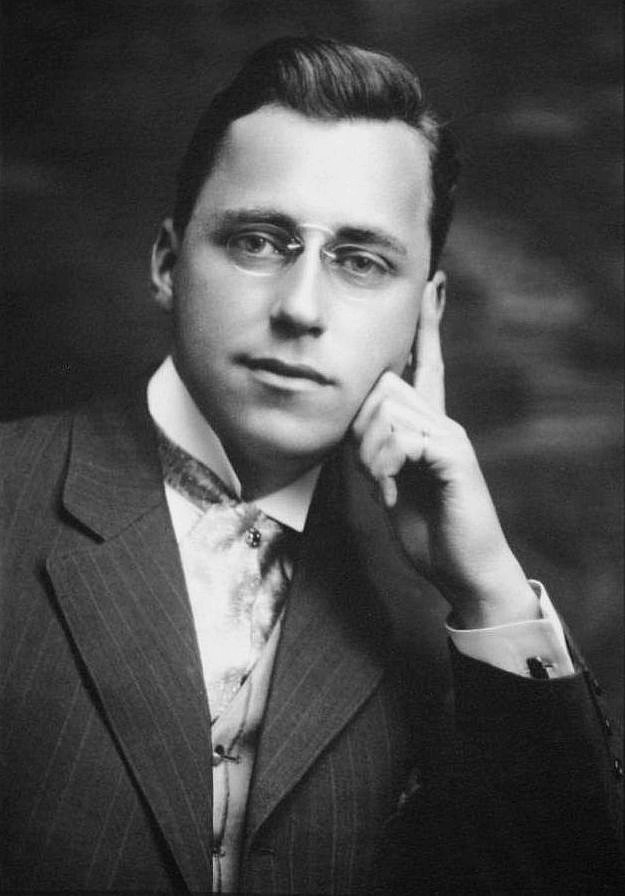
- Photo taken between 1911 and 1913
- Born: June 6, 1883; New York City, U.S.
- Died: March 19, 1932 (aged 48); Ossining, New York, U.S.
- Education: National Academy of Design
- Occupations: Art Manager; Illustrator
- Spouse: Lauretta Willey (1880–1972)

Paul Martin (June 6, 1883 – March 19, 1932) was an American commercial artist and illustrator. He designed the world's largest sign, which spanned a city block in Times Square from 1917 to 1924. The massive electrical display was a panoramic, multicolored light show with animated characters. He created a lithograph poster supporting the war effort in 1918. His artwork appeared on twenty covers of Collier's between 1923 and 1927. Martin won Parents' Magazine's "Cover of the Year" award from 1928 to 1930. He reshaped the long-running Fisk tire mascot in early 1930. This new character appeared in thirteen issues of The Saturday Evening Post. Martin created the official poster for the Girl Scouts in 1931. It was displayed at their troop meetings from 1931 to 1937.

He played in sanctioned tennis tournaments around the New York metropolitan area from 1909 to 1931. These included the U.S. National Championships (now US Open) of 1920, 1921, and 1924. (Note: Talbert, William F.; Axthelm, Pete. Tennis Observed, 1967, pp. 98–99, 102. Martin played men's singles at Forest Hills in 1920 and 1924, and at the Germantown Cricket Club in 1921. His U.S. National debut came at age 37.) The Paul Martin singles tournament was held for eighty-four years between 1932 and 2019. (Note: The Westchester County Tennis League organized singles competition every year from 1932 to 2019 (except 1942–45). It was the longest-running tennis event named after an individual, excluding Roland-Garros and the Davis Cup. The Paul Martin doubles counterpart ran from 1932 to 1981 (except 1942–45). Further details are available on Fultonhistory.com by entering "Paul Martin Memorial.") (Note: The singles and doubles were both called tournaments. Today, they would be considered individual events within the same tournament. The competition was hosted by various member clubs on a rotating basis.) He played doubles with Franklin P. Adams, collaborated on a book with Howard R. Garis, and was an interclub teammate of Vincent Richards. The war effort poster has been displayed at the Tennis Hall of Fame since 1965. (Note: New York Tribune, Sep 9, 1919, p. 15; Jun 2, 1920, p. 13; Jun 16, 1920, p. 13; Jul 26, 1921, p. 12; May 23, 1922, p. 13. The New York Times, Jun 23, 1923, p. 7. Brooklyn Daily Eagle, Sep 24, 1930, p. 25. Both Bessie Holden and Mrs. Martin played in these events.)

== Background ==
The Golden Age of Illustration began in the 1880s. It coincided with major advancements in printing techniques. These included breakthroughs in the halftone process, which made commercial image printing more economical, feasible, and realistic. Consequently, the strenuous, time-consuming process of wood engraving was gradually replaced by photoengraving, which produced highly accurate reproductions. Howard Pyle is often regarded as the "Father of American Illustration." Other notable figures included Charles Dana Gibson, J. C. Leyendecker, Maxfield Parrish, Norman Rockwell, and N. C. Wyeth. However, most illustrators received little recognition. Critics perceived their artwork as commercially driven rather than creatively inspired. Their views of fine art was the polar opposite. Nevertheless, these illustrators communicated and documented people's aspirations, concerns, customs, humor, ideals, labor, morals, and social interests.

Major advancements in photographic equipment and technology occurred during the 1930s. This led to a decades-long shift from illustrated to photographic covers, yet those expressive artistic styles persisted. Eventually, graphic design became the near-universal standard. Meanwhile, the magazine industry relied heavily on advertising revenue. It suffered from the popularity of radio and, particularly, television. These large-scale broadcast networks were much more appealing to advertisers. Specialized magazines fared better by targeting specific audiences, thereby suffering fewer losses in readership and revenue. Ultimately, the internet revolution forced numerous periodicals to either shut down or transition to digital formats. These shifts effectively ended the era of hand-drawn covers.

== Life ==
He was born to Hannah A. (née Morrow) and Robert C. Martin, a brick merchant, in New York City on June 6, 1883. He was the second youngest of nine children, three of whom did not reach adulthood. The Martins resided on 31st St. in Manhattan, between 8th and 9th Avenues, throughout the 1880s. They moved northward to Central Harlem on Edgecombe Ave. in 1890. Two of Paul's sisters died, aged one and sixteen, between 1891 and 1893. The family relocated to another section of Central Harlem at 129th St. and 5th Ave. in 1898. They belonged to the Twenty-fourth Street M. E. Church (until 1890) and Calvary M. E. Church (until 1908). (Note: New-York Tribune, May 1, 1899, p. 7. President William McKinley attended Sunday service at Calvary amid great fanfare.) His father was the superintendent of their Sunday schools. (Note: Meyer, Henry H., ed. Sunday School Journal, Jan 1918, pp. 8–9. "The New Testament and the Old." This lesson highlights their differences. HathiTrust. It is cataloged under the title Church School Journal.)

Martin enjoyed drawing as a boy. His first regular job was as a brokerage clerk at age 16. Between 1902 and 1906, he studied commercial art at the National Academy of Design. (Note: The school was located at 109th St. and Amsterdam Ave. in NYC. He continued to live on West 129th St.) His instructors included Charles Louis Hinton, Francis Coates Jones, George W. Maynard, and Edgar Melville Ward. His first professional job was with the New-York Tribune in 1905. He succeeded the Tribune's Stephen H. Horgan as art manager and held the position from 1906 to 1912. (Note: Allen, Frederick J. Advertising as a Vocation, 1919, pp. 98–99. Subheaded "The Art Manager.") Martin continued to live at home during those years, typically as a boarder. The family moved from Upper Manhattan to rural Maplewood, New Jersey, in 1908. A nearby train station provided convenient access to Manhattan. (Note: Paul, Robert C., & Robert F. Martin all worked in Manhattan. Trow's, 1909, p. 937.) Their new church was two blocks away. (Note: They lived on Ridgewood Ter., while Morrow Memorial (United) Methodist was on Ridgewood Rd. Madison Eagle (N.J.), Aug 20, 1915, p. 1. Wallace B. Fleming served as pastor from 1904 to 1911. The church ledger confirmed the Martins' membership.) He joined the local tennis club on centrally located Baker St. in 1909. His first two sanctioned tournaments took place at Nyack and Morristown. His opening matches were played on August 31 and September 13, 1909, respectively. His older brother Ralph also debuted at Nyack, though one day earlier on August 30. Ralph was related to muralist Charles Yardley Turner through marriage. Paul's doubles partner in Maplewood was Harry Balch from 1909 to 1912. They lived only a few houses apart. (Note: "Many Players". New-York Tribune, May 17, 1910, p. 9; May 20, 1910, p. 8; May 29, 1910, p. 8; Jun 2, 1910, p. 9; Jun 21, 1910, p. 9; Jul 2, 1910, p. 9; The Sun, May 29, 1911, p. 4; May 31, 1911, p. 9; Aug 12, 1911, p. 7; Aug 14, 1911, p. 9; Jul 4, 1912, p. 9. He was particularly active from 1910 to 1911.)

Martin married Lauretta Willey (pronounced "WILL-ee") at the First M. E. Church on Washington St. in Hoboken, New Jersey, in 1912. (Note: Building. Our Second Methodist Postcard Album, 1991, p. 29. Internet Archive.) The Rev. Henry J. Johnston officiated. The couple had first met years earlier at Calvary Methodist. (Note: Lauretta's parents were Mary Immler (1854–1937) and Jacob Willey (1849–1939). The Daily Argus (Mt. Vernon, N.Y.), Aug 2, 1937, p. 2. Mary's obituary: "[She] lived in Mt. Vernon 25 years. She was a member of the Chester Hill M. E. Church." The New York Times, Jul 27, 1939, p. 19. Jacob's obituary: "[A] real estate operator and produce dealer.") Lauretta's siblings were schoolteacher Emma and accountant Walter, who later owned the Willey Book Co. They first lived together in an apartment in the Bronx's University Heights neighborhood from 1912 to 1915. They relocated one block east to another rental in 1915. The Martins actively participated in tennis tournaments, both with their local club and on the USLTA circuit. (Note: They belonged to the University Heights (Bronx) and later County (Hartsdale, N.Y.) tennis clubs. Their career highlights are covered within the "Tennis" section.) He worked for the innovative O. J. Gude Company from 1912 to 1919. It was the industry leader in outdoor advertising. His O. J. Gude office was first located at 935 Broadway (1912–13). It then moved to the Candler Building in Times Square, at 220 West 42nd St. (1913–19). He worked for the advertising firm Gotham Studios from 1919 to 1920. Its operations moved from 1133 Broadway (St. James Building) to East 24th St., near 4th (now Park) Ave., on January 1, 1920. Martin went freelance in August and rented a small studio in September 1920. (Note: Clock Repair. This is Martin's first freelancing credit.) It was located on East 27th St., between Lexington and 3rd Avenues. Freelancing offered him independence, flexible hours, and creative control, though with income uncertainty. He joined the Artists' Guild in December 1920.

Paul and Lauretta moved from the Bronx to a secluded, wooded section of Millwood, New York, in August 1925. The upstairs of their first owned home served as a studio from 1925 to 1932. The workplace included a darkroom and dedicated areas for easels and props. Natural northern light came in through the large side window. (Note: The props included caps, jackets, jerseys, neckties, pajamas, shirts, sports equipment, and sweaters. His published works incorporated them. They sometimes appeared in multiple illustrations. Leather Cap; Leather Cap 2. The same helmet is shown in these two files at Wikimedia Commons.) He occasionally used family members as models. His niece, Edna, is shown writing down the license plate number of a boy's wagon on the cover of Liberty, September 12, 1925. She also appears on an American Junior Red Cross poster. His mother-in-law is basting a turkey for Thanksgiving on the cover of People's Home Journal, November 1928. The Martins attended Highland (later Ossining United) Methodist Church in downtown Ossining.

Martin underwent an operation for a stomach ulcer at Ossining Hospital on March 12, 1932. He died from an infection one week later at age 48. The service was held at Highland Methodist Church. He was survived by three brothers and one sister. He was known in tennis circles for his athletic ability, active participation, friendliness, and sportsmanship. (Note: Bronxville Press, Aug 16, 1932, p. 4. He was a dedicated tennis enthusiast. Consequently, his freelance commercial output declined.) The Bronxville Press published a retrospective in August 1932: "His presence was always felt by topnotchers [and regulars]. Paul Martin was a synonym for all that was clean and wholesome in the game." His wife Lauretta later lived in Mount Vernon, New York, from 1935 to 1972.

== Collier's ==
General-interest magazines flourished before the advent of television. (Note: This category covered a variety of entertainment, pictures, politics, serials, short stories, and sports.) One of them was the historically significant Collier's, which experienced a resurgence under editor William L. Chenery in 1925. Martin drew twenty covers for the magazine between 1923 and 1927. These included the Christmas issues of 1924 and 1926. Some artists created a distinctive niche by focusing on drawing comical situations, domestic follies, political satire, pretty women, or simple pleasures. Martin's speciality was portraying a boy engaged in various lighthearted moments. This youth appeared on eighteen covers of Collier's: bobbing for apples, loading up on desserts, shooting marbles, playing the flute, sporting a straw hat, shoveling snow, winding up a spinning top, carrying schoolbooks, eating holiday turkey, catching a baseball, playing football, going down a water slide, sleigh riding, gleefully swimming, saying grace, getting a buzz cut, working as a messenger, and daydreaming about fishing. Martin rarely deviated from that path. The most notable departure was a self-portrait. He depicted himself as a well-dressed, vocal spectator at the horse races.

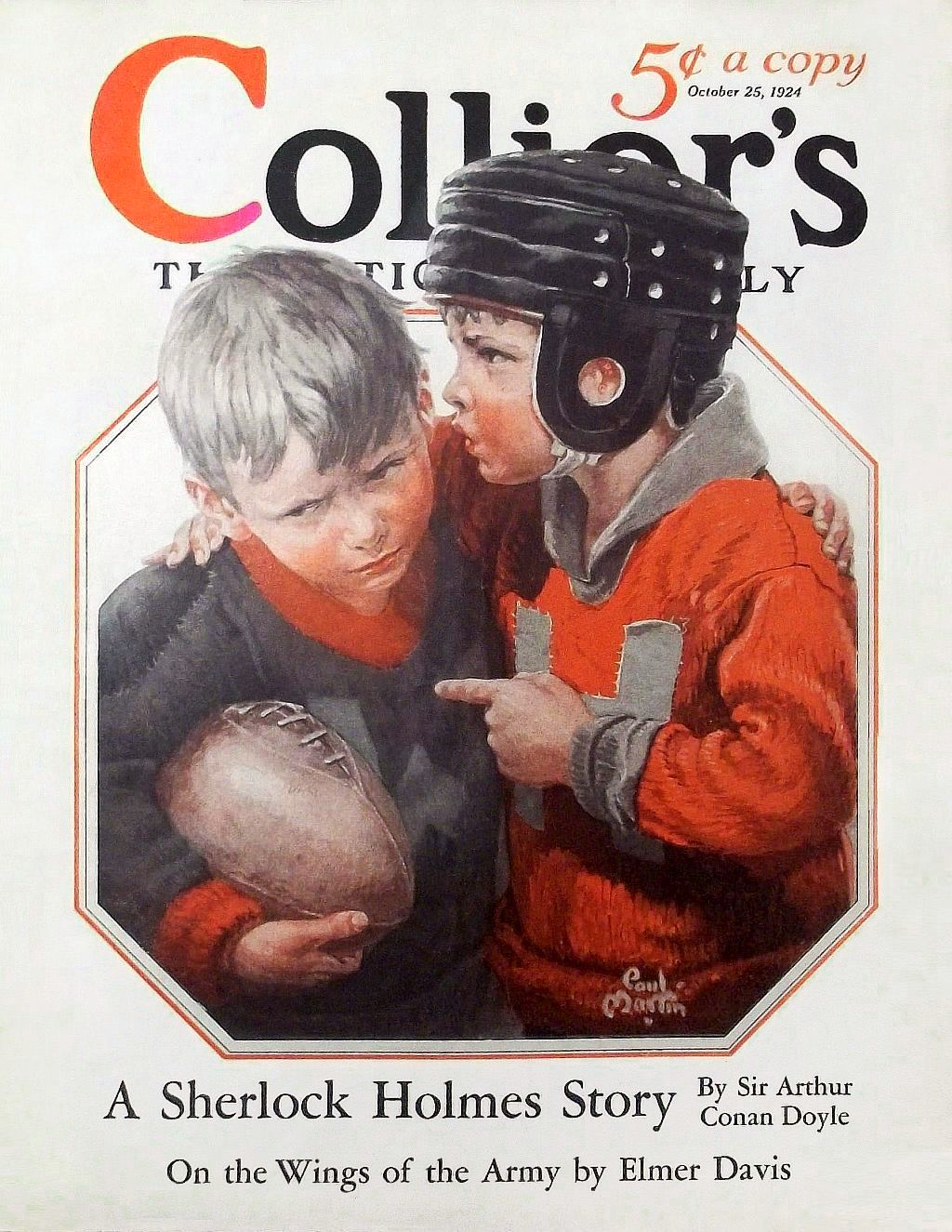
Calling the play, Collier's, 1924

His drawing style was simple yet bold, nostalgically capturing the carefree innocence of youth. It resonated with people who had just lived through a catastrophic world war and an influenza pandemic. Martin excluded nonessential details such as extra figures, scenery, structures, and trees, which allowed viewers to make an instant connection. His paintings are readily recognizable by their consistent themes and styles. They sometimes gave the illusion of three-dimensional depth. This effect was achieved by using techniques such as color intensity variation, linear perspective, and overlapping. His cover art almost always had a holiday or seasonal theme, or otherwise reflected the magazine's image. (Note: This was common practice at the time. Collier's tended to prefer uncluttered cover art that conveyed clear and direct messages. The Post adopted a contrasting approach.) It corresponded directly to an inside article on only one occasion.

Creative Process: Martin first visualized ideas and developed them into conceptual sketches. These were refined into rough drafts and sent to art editors for possible publication. Submissions were either rejected or accepted, sometimes with a modification request. Rejected submissions were sometimes resubmitted elsewhere. Martin then hired mostly local boys for photo sessions. Afterward, prints were made from the developed film in a darkroom. He drew the preliminary and final versions, using these prints as guides. This process gave him more options and flexibility than working from live models. It was also more practical, given children's tendency to be active and impatient. He interacted with them from behind the camera to capture the desired facial expressions. His wife helped by preparing the models for their scenes. (Note: American Art Annual, 1922, p. 498. His studios were in Manhattan (1920–25) and at home in Millwood (1925–32). HathiTrust.)

Collier's advertising and circulation revenues steadily declined after World War II, primarily driven by the rapid rise of television. Collier's was forced to cease publication in December 1956. Its top competitors (Life, Look, and the Post) held out longer.

== Commercial artist ==
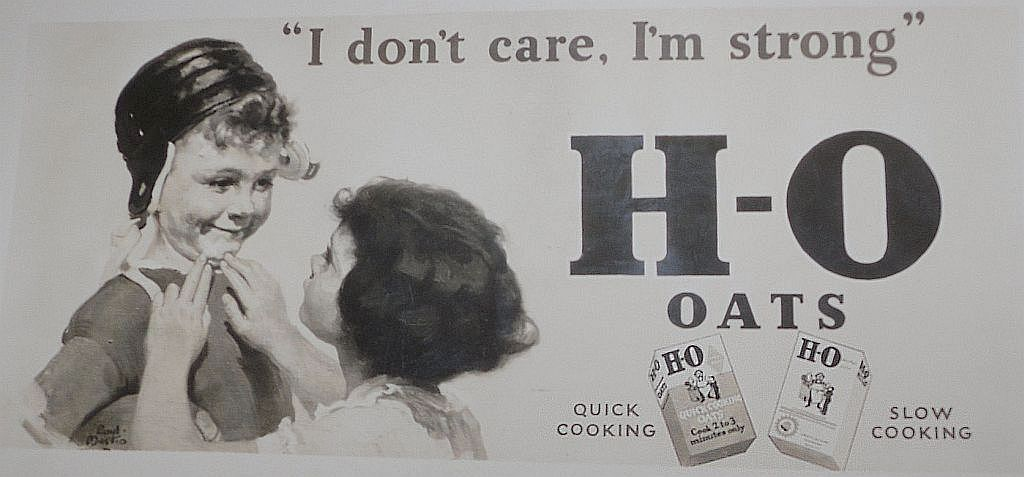
H-O Oats, printer's proof card for outdoor advertising sign, 1931

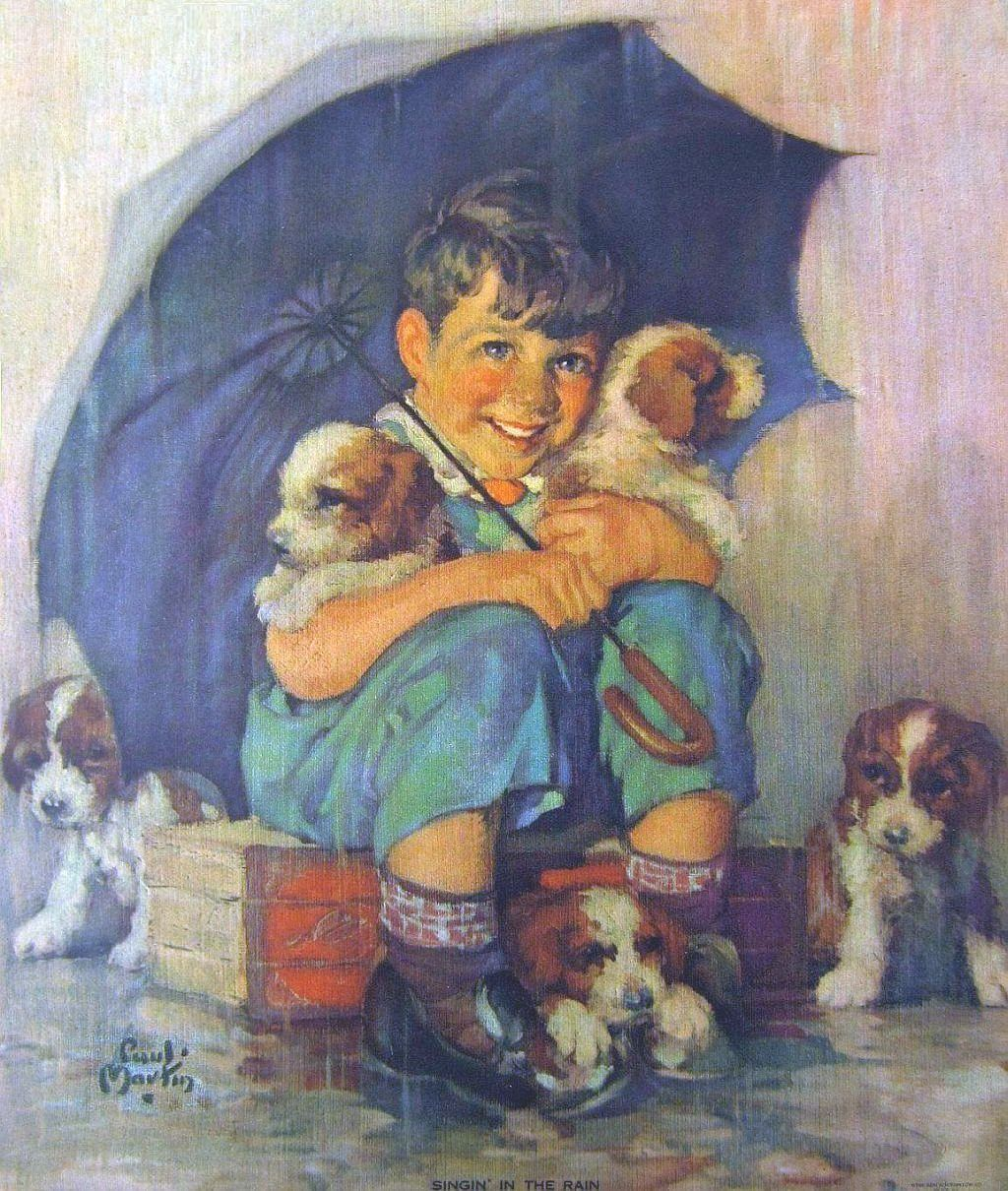
Singin' in the Rain. Gerlach Barklow art print

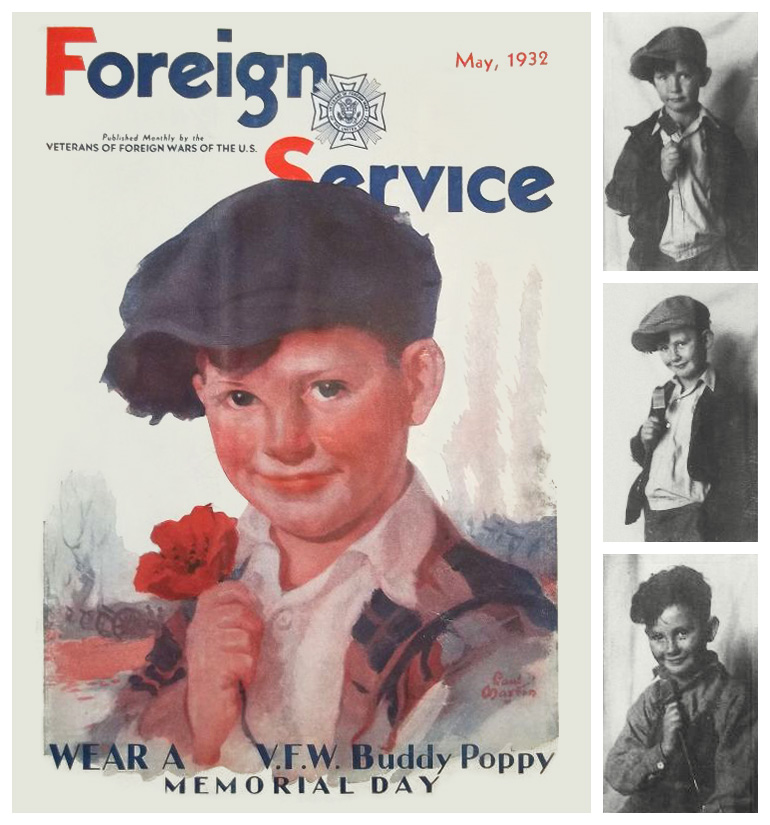
Three photo shoot poses and the resulting Memorial Day cover

Martin designed the Wrigley Company's original light bulb extravaganza, which showcased six acrobatic "spearmen" on a Broadway billboard in 1917. It was the world's largest display panel, at 200 by 50 feet. The rooftop structure covered a full city block in Times Square between 43rd and 44th Streets. This panoramic light show was a major tourist attraction for seven years. The Wrigley name became synonymous with large-scale advertising because of such massive displays. Martin created a poster with a double meaning for the War Camp Activities in 1918. It was titled Serve Your Country and depicted a fashionable young woman serving a tennis ball. Women participated nationwide in fundraising tournaments to support recreation for on-base service members. However, the title carried a broader meaning aligned with the War Camp Community Service's mission. (Note: The federally run War Camp Activities addressed soldiers' needs within the barracks, while the War Camp Community Service provided entertainment for troops on leave. They had a supportive and complementary relationship.) It encouraged women to entertain off-duty Marines, sailors, and soldiers by joining them in activities such as dancing, dining, sightseeing, socializing, and attending theater shows. A silkscreen version of the poster has been displayed at the Tennis Hall of Fame since 1965.

He drew five different scenes of snow activities for the New York, Ontario and Western Railway (a passenger and freight carrier) in 1921–22. They depicted the Catskills of Sullivan County as a lively and refreshing vacation spot. He designed greeting cards for William Edwin Rudge, Inc., of Mount Vernon, New York. Martin drew a cheerful boy eating Heinz Baked Beans while confidently declaring, "I Know Beans," in 1927. (Note: Official Gazette, May 1927, vol. 358, p. 632 (slogan). HathiTrust.) For the American Junior Red Cross, he created two posters in 1929–30. The first was titled The Flag of Service the World Around. It featured children in festive costumes behind the globe, with one holding up a large Red Cross flag. The second was titled Juniors Helping Everywhere. It showed twenty miniature scenes of children worldwide in various supportive roles.

Martin painted three advertisements for General Electric's distinctive, all-steel "Monitor Top" refrigerator in 1930. The first and most elaborate featured two boys running a lemonade stand. Their mother looked on with approval through the open kitchen window. This full-page ad appeared simultaneously in more than twelve magazines. Printers' Ink published the following complimentary review in 1930: "'Electric Lemonaide, 5 cents per glass,' reads the sign of the youthful shopkeepers. And the lads are soliciting trade in a strenuous manner, as a friendly dog enters into the spirit of the event with challenging barks. ... [I]t is a picture filled with action and story-telling strength. But because the advertised product has been worked in so adroitly, the illustration seems doubly effective and relevant." —W. Livingston Larned. (Note: Larned, W. Livingston. Illustration in Advertising, 1925, pp. 64–71.) His other "Monitor Top" ads featured a girl playing with building blocks, and two dressed-up girls listening to an enthusiastic sales boy. This appliance was considered the first reliable and relatively affordable model for residential use, even with a starting price of $205.

He designed three billboards for the Hecker H-O (Hornby's Oatmeal) Company of Buffalo, New York, in 1931. One showed a young, banged-up football player, full of confidence after eating oats for breakfast. (Note: He is wearing a leather helmet while playing football. She is applying a bandage while telling him to be more careful. The girl was actually the boy's visiting aunt Helen, an older preteen. They posed for two H-O Oats paintings during the same photo shoot. The other was titled You can't call me Skinny now! Her modeling career lasted only one day. U.S. Censuses of 1920–1950, listed under Joseph Banyai (b. 1884). Helen Banyai was born in 1918. Joseph's sister, Rose, was the mother of the boy (Donald Reynolds). More details about him are in other notes.) The other two emphasized the cereal's healthiness (Note: Advertising Outdoors, Dec 1931, pp. 39–40. "Reproducing the Poster." An enlarged projection of the original artwork served as a guide for hand-copying the image onto 44" × 60" sheets. However, this tedious process could also be done photographically to eliminate manual copying. The images were then chemically transferred to zinc plates for further processing, including inking. These steps allowed a near-exact replica to enter production.) and deliciousness. These large 25-by-12-foot ads appeared on poster panels and attracted the attention of passing motorists and pedestrians. They also had short runs in food markets—on walls, windows, or suspended from wires. (Note: Printers' Ink, Feb 12, 1920, pp. 89–90. The display periods were brief because company salesmen continually pushed to highlight their own products. This direct approach predated the emergence of food brokers. Many store owners would not allow ads to hang from overhead wires. They felt that such displays created a cluttered appearance.) His drawings were also used to promote businesses on Gerlach Barklow calendars, ink blotter cards, and prints, starting in 1931. One depicted a seated boy holding an umbrella among five puppies. Another showed a boy struggling to comprehend scientific theories.

Martin painted a contest-winning poster for the Girl Scouts in 1931. It was titled Usefulness • Beauty • Health • Truth • Knowledge. The contest was conducted by the Art Alliance of America. This organization brought together craftspeople and advertisers. There were between two and three hundred submissions. The judging panel consisted of W. T. Benda (who replaced Charles Dana Gibson), Ray Greenleaf, Rockwell Kent, John La Gatta, Neysa McMein, and Edward A. Wilson. Martin's model for the poster was 14-year-old Barbara Smith of Darien, Connecticut, who had previously lived in Yonkers, New York. Her parents and Martin were lifelong friends. He served as best man at their wedding back in 1904. The Girl Scouts' national director, Josephine Schain, presented the top three winners with checks for $100, $200, and $300. These ceremonial exchanges took place at the Scouts' national headquarters at 670 Lexington Avenue in Manhattan. The three award recipients then posed together behind their entries. National president Birdsall Otis Edey was one of three consultants, along with executives Anne Hyde Choate and Genevieve Garvan Brady. Martin's poster captured the movement's spirit "in striking fashion." It was displayed on troop members' bedroom walls and on bulletin boards and stands at their meeting places from 1931 to 1937. The poster was placed in window displays for promotional purposes. It also appeared on the covers of Girl Scout Equipment for Fall 1932 and Spring 1933. All printed images showed a modified version with three raised fingers instead of a salute. Martin remarked at the award ceremony, "Barbara seems the personification of all that Girl Scouting means. She is the very spirit of radiant, happy, and wholesome young girlhood, and my mind naturally turned to her immediately when I learned of the competition."

He created the official Buddy Poppy poster in 1932. It was named after a term used by former soldiers to remember their companions killed in World War I. Foreign Service published a complimentary review in its May 1932 issue: "The original was painted in oil by the late Paul Martin, noted New York poster artist, who died suddenly on March 19th following a serious operation." The poster was described as "one of the most striking and appropriate designs ever used" to symbolize the Buddy Poppy. This was a red artificial flower worn in honor of the fallen Allied soldiers. "It was completed shortly before the artist's death and is believed to have been his last important assignment. (Note: Sales (#16) – via Wayback Machine. These details are for greater clarity and accuracy. Martin sold the painting to Parents' Magazine in March 1930. Lauretta's notes—later copied by her niece, Adele—indicate the piece went unused. Parents sold the painting to American Lithographic, which negotiated with Martin to adapt it as a Memorial Day poster for Veterans of Foreign Wars. The adapted artwork appeared shortly thereafter on the cover of Foreign Service, dated May 1932.) Those familiar with Paul Martin's career as an artist declare the 1932 Buddy Poppy poster to be one of his best creations." It was featured nationally in newspapers from 1932 to 1933.

Martin's work appeared in a variety of formats, ranging from billboards to greeting cards to calendars. (Note: There are also unsigned credits that cannot be verified. A neighbor, William Everett Orser (1919–2016), posed for him as the Dutch Boy. This is according to nonagenarian Don Reynolds and records kept by Lauretta Martin. His paintings were occasionally turned into unsalvageable, large outdoor displays. Scaled-down counterparts of these billboards in grocery markets were typically discarded. Consequently, surviving pictures are generally limited to those published in trade magazines. Panel (Date column). Further details are available via the links in that column. Commons.) His paintings usually revolved around children, and sometimes included a friendly pup.

== Fisk tire boy ==
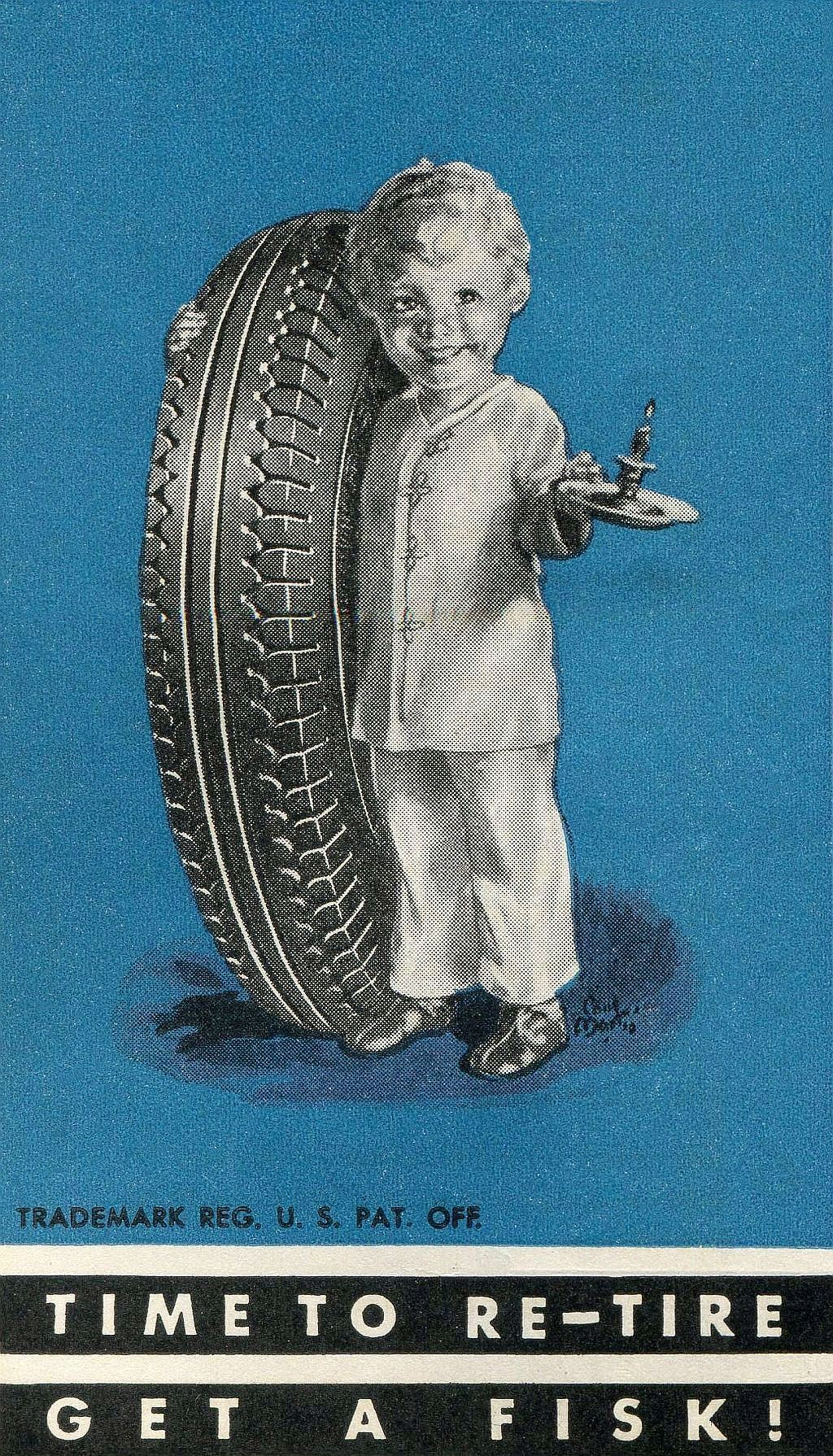
The Post, print-signed, 1930

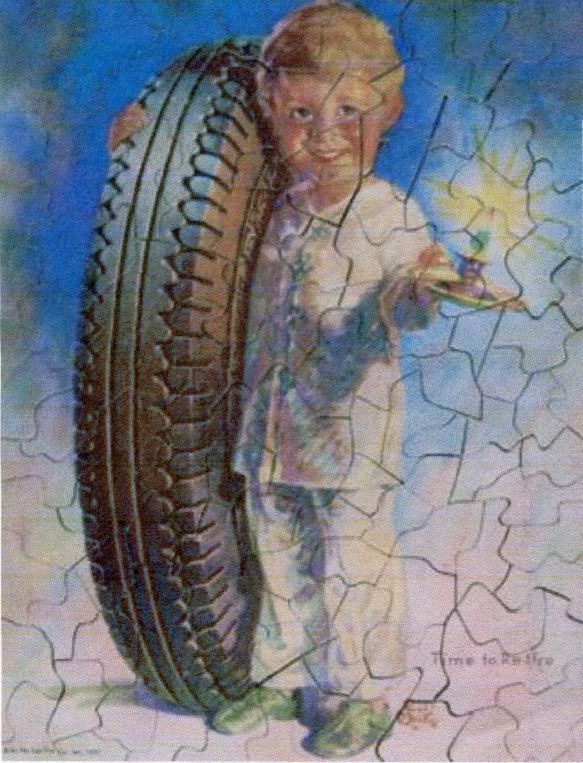
Jigsaw Puzzle, Design No. 1, print-signed, 1933

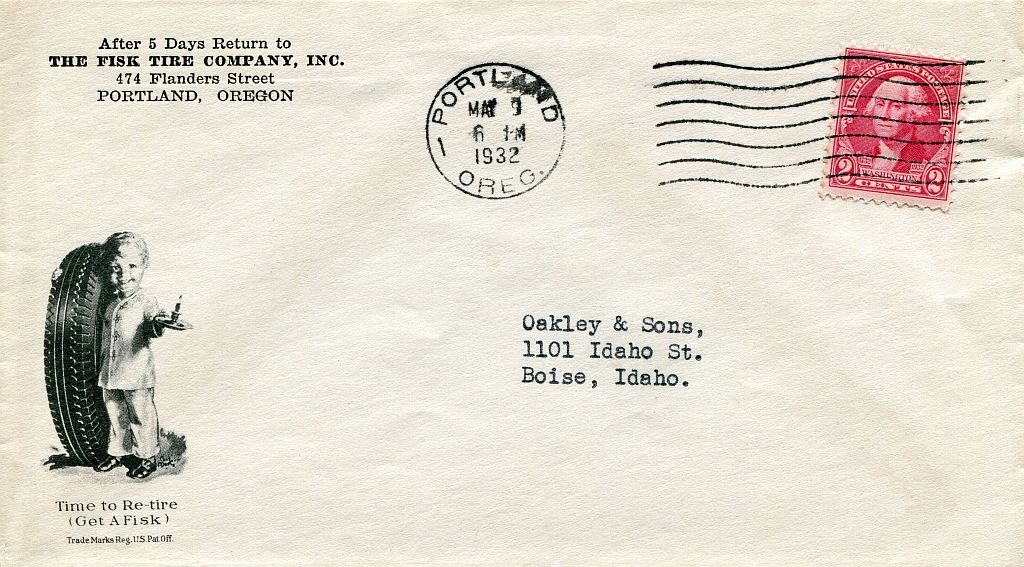
Postmarked envelope, print-signed, 1932

The Fisk Rubber Company was manufacturing tires for automobiles, bicycles, and carriages by 1901. Its factory was located along the riverfront in Chicopee Falls, Massachusetts. The plant produced about 230,000 tires in August 1921. Fisk struggled financially before and during the Great Depression. It was acquired by U.S. Rubber (maker of the U.S. Royal brand) in 1940. Its worldwide subsidiaries—then operating under various names—adopted the unifying name of Uniroyal in 1966. A major merger created Uniroyal Goodrich (1986). The tire division was sold to Michelin (1990). Affiliated dealers of Fisk tires included Kmart (1962–78) and Discount Tire (1996–2015). There was an inactive period from 1981 to 1995.

Martin completely reshaped a once-famous and whimsical character in American advertising. It was the Fisk Rubber Company's "sleepy boy," who shouldered an oversized tire while tilting a lighted candle. It was introduced with the motoring message "Time to Re-tire," which debuted in 1910. This catchphrase relied on a simple double meaning. The lad's original prodigious yawn became a smile in early 1929. Late that year, Martin was commissioned to create a slightly older, modern-day figure. The goal was to update the heavily publicized trademark while maintaining its charm and familiarity. The boy's one-piece sleeper became a two-piece pajama set, enhanced with stylish zip-up slippers. Martin's four-year-old nephew was the model from the neck down. The two essential props remained, but now featured a modern tire tread pattern and a more fashionable, less-tilted candleholder.

The publicity manager at Fisk provided an early review in March 1930: "a happy, smiling, 100 percent American boy in his little two-piece pajama, radiating good cheer, ruddy-cheeked and tousle-headed, snappy and wide awake, standing in the old-time pose." Many newspapers ran a story that complimented the new look from May to June 1930. The youngster was described as more energetic, robust, and modern ("in keeping with the times").

This updated character appeared in thirteen issues of The Saturday Evening Post between February 8 and August 23, 1930. These ads promoted the newly introduced "Air-Flight" tires. A full-length, colorful print of the boy was publicly offered. The cheerful mascot showed up on various items, both with and without facial touch-ups. Three signed variants are pictured. (Note: His credits include all images of the boy wearing a two-piece pajama set, which served as the company's logo from 1930 to 1934.) It was featured on the front covers and endpapers of eight children's fairy tale or folktale books in 1931. The titles are Candy Land, Jack and the Bean Stalk, Little Black Sambo, Peter Rabbit, Pied Piper, Three Bears, Three Little Kittens, and Three Little Pigs. They were generically subtitled Time to Re-tire: A Bedtime Story. The mascot also appeared on ashtrays, bridge score pads, cigarette cases, (Note: They came with internal elastic straps (also called bands).) electric clocks, (Note: Hogan Handbook; Fisk-Federal-Badger Tires, Thomas E. Hogan, Inc., 1935, p. 35. Wholesale cost to retailers was $2.25 for the clock and 25¢ for the ash tray.) jigsaw puzzles, matchbooks, posters, and rubber heel replacements for shoes. These were complimentary items for existing or potential customers. Martin's lively figure was depicted on retailers' data books, letterheads, mailing envelopes, and storefront windows. (Note: These were glue decals that stuck to the windows.) A miniature version showed up in The American Boy, Boys' Life, automotive magazines, and hundreds of newspapers from 1930 to 1934.

However, Fisk was in financial trouble. Roughly two-thirds of the Fisk dealers lost their franchises in November 1930. They failed to meet a new monetary requirement. This drastic corporate downsizing aimed to reduce operating costs. It followed three consecutive years of declining sales and mounting debts. Furthermore, the Great Depression had devastated the entire rubber industry through fierce price wars. This downward spiral was already underway due to stiff competition from mail-order houses. Martin's mascot was never firmly established by a sustained promotional campaign. It would have involved significant—yet necessary—expenditures. Fisk ultimately defaulted on interest payments to bondholders and entered receivership on January 3, 1931. A new management team was appointed in May 1933. The receivership period officially ended on August 21, 1934. Based on public sentiment, management decided to bring back the original character in late 1934. This reversal was unusual, as other companies had successfully modernized their mascots despite the inherent risks.

Timeline: The pajama-clad boy went through three distinct stages, as seen in print. They are as follows: 1. 1910–1928, 1935–present (used sporadically). (Note: "Master Pajamas" faded in popularity over time. Nonetheless, the image showed up on automotive boxes and parts until 1978. This assortment included air filters, brake fluid, car mats, car wax, coolant, headlamps, oil filters, shock absorbers, spark plugs, and tune-up kits. It later appeared on Franklin Mint collectibles, Dover postcards, and Lionel boxcars.) The original, yawning figure created by Burr Giffen. 2. 1929 – January 1930. An uncredited version in which the yawn became a smile. 3. February 1930 – 1934. Updated version by Paul Martin, whose credits include all images of the two-piece pajamas. Transitional Overlaps: The previous character sometimes remained after a changeover, especially in 1935. Minor touch-ups were made in various years. Norman Rockwell had also painted the trade character in 1917–20 and 1923–25.

Martin's reputation for drawing boys secured him the important commission. A common practice for artists during that period was to carve their own niche. Boys, dogs, and pretty women were very popular themes with the public.

== Magazine cover illustrator ==
His signature (or printed name) appears on all the covers. It remained fairly consistent—with a slanted t-crossbar, curved "P" and "M," an underline mark, and the first name stacked above the last name.

His cover artwork for Foreign Service was initially sold to Parents in 1930. However, the piece went unused and was consequently sold to American Lithographic and then to Foreign Service. The 25th anniversary issue of Parents was dated October 1951. This silver jubilee cover featured miniatures of twenty-five previous covers (one for each year from 1926 to 1950). Martin illustrated three of the miniatures in the composite: October 1928, August 1929, and October 1930. He thus unofficially won Parents' Magazine's "Cover of the Year" honors for 1928–30. (Note: Most of those twenty-five selections were also shown on its Oct 1956 cover. Text overlays obscured the rest.) Additionally, the publication's long-standing, two-word title debuted with that August 1929 issue.

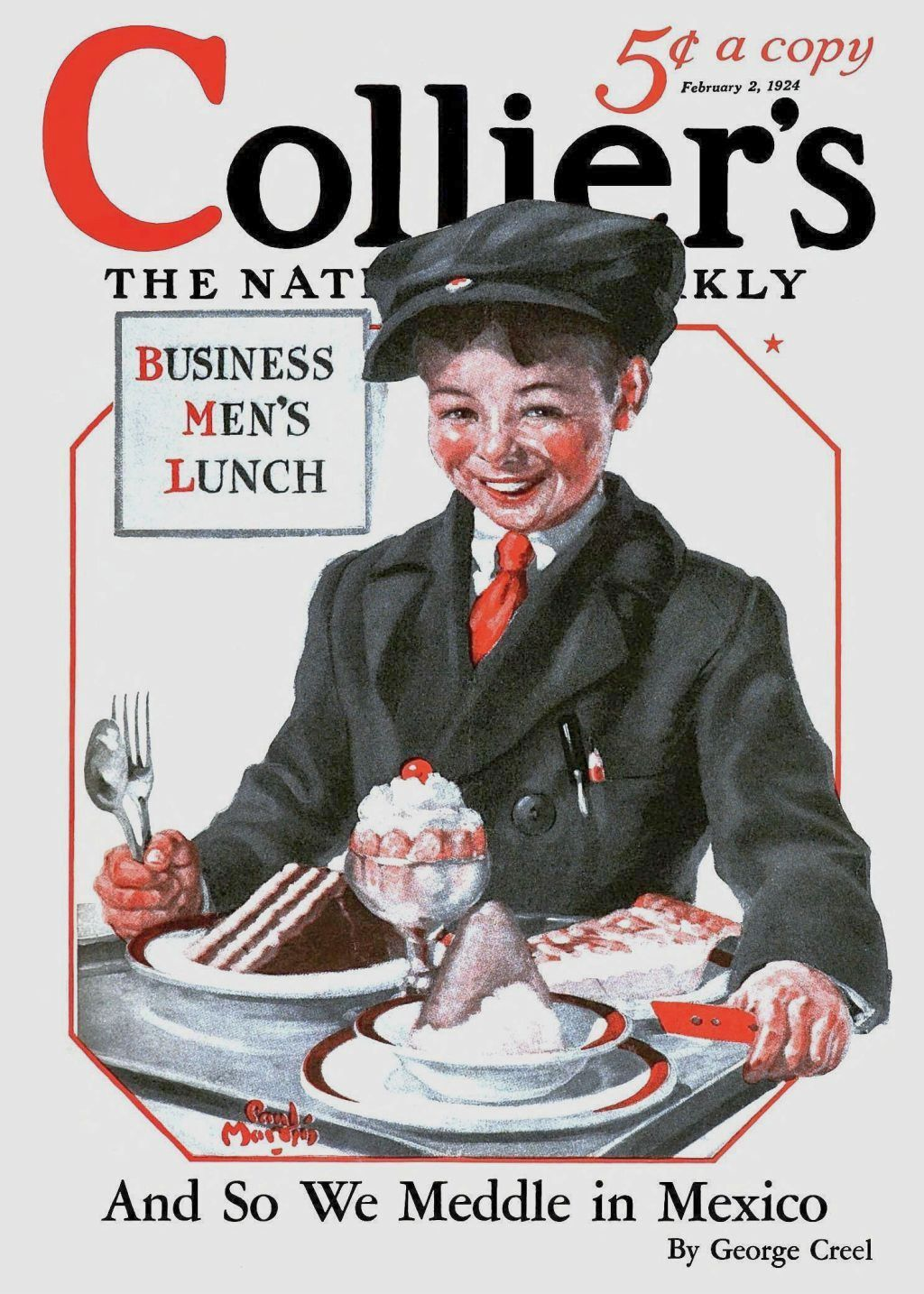
Business Men's Lunch: cream pie, chocolate cake, rice pudding, and an ice cream sundae. Collier's, 1924

The following list contains thirty-seven consumer magazine credits, including three from September 1925.

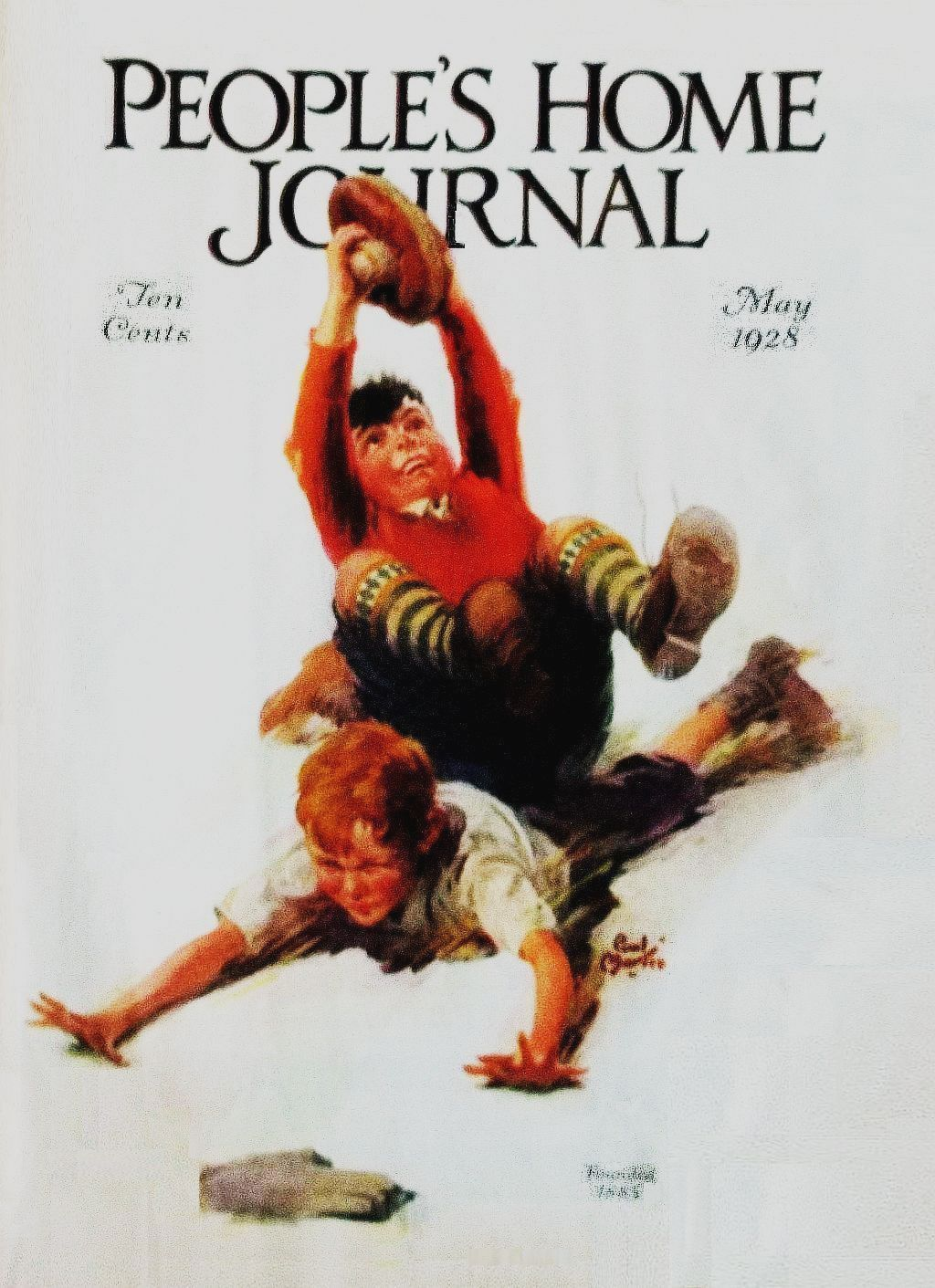
Runner slides home, PHJ, 1928

- The American Girl (1917–1979): Oct 1931
- Collier's (1888–1957): May 26, 1923; Feb 2, 1924; Jun 28, 1924; Oct 25, 1924; Nov 11, 1924; Dec 27, 1924; May 2, 1925; May 30, 1925; Jun 27, 1925; Jul 4, 1925; Jul 25, 1925; Sep 19, 1925; Oct 31, 1925; Jan 1, 1926; Feb 13, 1926; May 22, 1926; Dec 25, 1926; Feb 26, 1927; Aug 13, 1927; Aug 27, 1927
- Everybody's (1899–1929): Sep 1925
- Farm & Fireside / Country Home (1877–1939): Nov 1923; Aug 1930 (Note: Farm & Fireside became Country Home with the Feb 1930 issue.)
- The Farmer's Wife (1897–1939): Jan 1931 (Note: It was sold to Farm Journal and published as Farm Journal and Farmer's Wife (May 1939–Jul 1945). The title was later shortened to Farm Journal with a "Farmer's Wife" back section (Aug 1945–1970).)
- Foreign Service (1914–present): May 1932
- Die Hausfrau (1904–present): Apr 1936
- Liberty (1924–1950): Sep 12, 1925
- Parents (Oct 1926–2022): Oct 1928; Feb 1929; May 1929; Aug 1929; Oct 1929; Feb 1930; Oct 1930
- People's Home Journal (1885–1929): May 1928; Nov 1928

Other credits: He created covers for four trade and customer magazines between 1920 and 1931. They were Advertising & Selling, Good Hardware, Progressive Grocer, and Silent Hostess. Coincidentally, Martin's last model for Parents later became an associate editor of Progressive Grocer from 1956 to 1961. (Note: Martin's model was Donald Bruce Reynolds (1924–2020). Their known collaborations are as follows: 1. Parents cover, Oct 1930 (reader). Internet Archive. This image later appeared on a Gerlach Barklow calendar with altered lettering (relativity). 2. GE refrigerator ad. Three children are dressed as adults (role-playing). 3. H-O Oats outdoor posters (a, b, and c). Commons. Their miniature versions were displayed in grocery stores. 4. Foreign Service cover, May 1932. — U.S. Census 1930 (under "Carlyle Reynolds," b. 1899). The artist and model lived on opposite ends of a long road. Oral history. "Americans in Wartime Experience." "Don's Life" (para. 2). "Fondest memories." Wayback Machine.)

== Book illustrator ==
His drawings for short stories include the following: • "Short Turns and Encores" by Dorothy Parker and others, Saturday Evening Post, Jul 29, 1922, p. 16. • "The Blanket" by Floyd Dell, Collier's, Oct 16, 1926, p. 18. • "The Unfairway" by Burford Lorimer (son of George Horace Lorimer), Collier's, Dec 25, 1926, pp. 22–23. • "Tragedy" by Eve Bernstein, Scribner's Magazine, Apr 1928, p. 479. • "On the Dark Trail" by Franklin Holt (pseudonym of Russell M. Coryell), Scribner's Magazine, Jul 1928, p. 71.

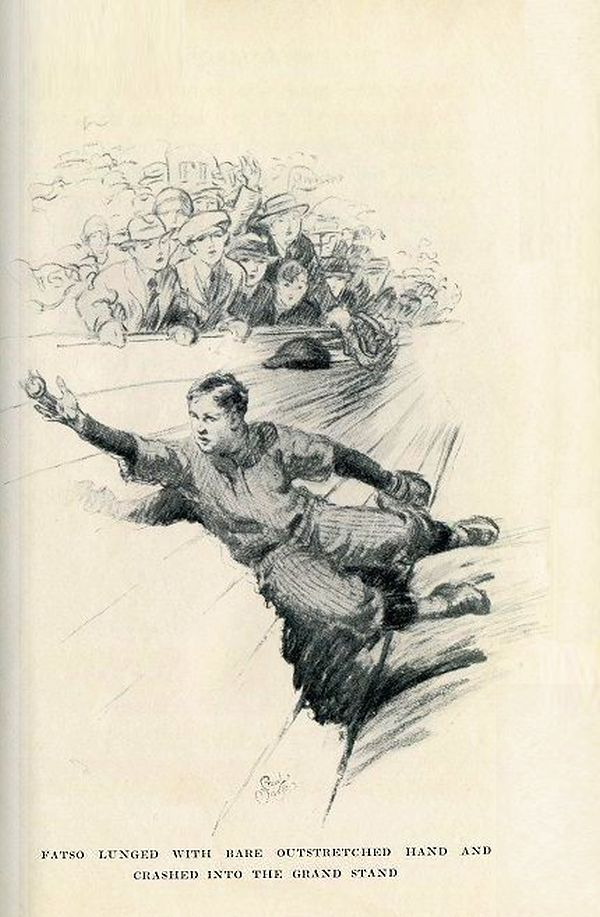
The Baseball Detective, 1928

The first six entries below are fictional or semi-fictional children's books. The sixth is a collaboration with Howard R. Garis. This genre often called for a more animated, imaginative, and whimsical drawing style (yet still in sync with the story). Martin's artwork credits are given in parentheses.

- Philus, the Stable Boy of Bethlehem, Edmund J. Cleveland, with a foreword by The Rt. Rev. Charles L. Slattery, Sep 1927 (dust jacket, frontispiece, facing pp. 52, 66, 124). It contains eleven moralistic, pseudo-narrative short stories spanning the church year. In the opener, a stable boy is present at the Nativity.
- Puck Chasers, Incorporated, Charles G. Muller, Sep 1927 (dust jacket [DJ], frontispiece [FP], facing pp. 36, 89, 164, 176). Students popularize a sport by overcoming obstacles. The setting is the Fisk School for Boys in East Grand Rapids, Michigan. This book is one of the earliest about ice hockey. Its predecessors largely focused on a variety of winter sports.
- Araminta, Helen Cady Forbes, Nov 1927 (DJ, FP, facing pp. 134, 212). Araminta turns eleven years old and finds an abandoned baby, who turns out to have been kidnapped.
- The Prince and the Pig's Gate, Robert Hugh Morris, May 1928 (DJ, FP, facing pp. 48, 134, 166). It comprises twenty-seven allegorical tales designed to teach moral lessons.
- The Baseball Detective, Charles G. Muller, Aug 1928 (DJ, FP, facing pp. 22, 132, 250). The story revolves around athletic competition, interesting characters, and mystery at an all-boys school.
- Chad of Knob Hill, Howard R. Garis, Sep 1929 (DJ, FP, pp. 14, 60, 85, 97, 163, 187, 213, 281). A Boy Scout troop marches past Chad, an overworked farmhand. He promptly decides to take their oath to become a Lone Scout. Garis also created stories about Uncle Wiggily, a gentlemanly rabbit with rheumatism.
- Stories of To-Day and Yesterday, Frederick Houk Law, editor, Feb 1930 (frontispiece). This instructional guide helps older students read, write, and appreciate short fiction.
- The Bookshelf for Boys and Girls, Clara Whitehill Hunt, chief ed., fall 1930; fall 1931 (dust jackets, both sides). This authoritative catalog selects the best books for children. (Note: Shreveport Journal, Dec 8, 1931, p. 8. Hunt was a recognized authority.)

== Tennis ==
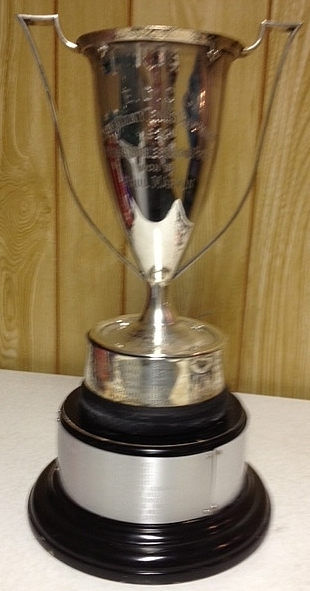
Paul Martin Memorial Trophy

Martin debuted on the USLTA circuit in 1909. He entered the national rankings at number 91 in 1918. Martin was ranked among the top thirty tennis players in the New York metropolitan area seven times: 1920–1925 and 1928. Formal classification of metro players did not begin until 1920. He broke into the top twenty in 1923 and 1924. His strength was hitting accurate shots from the backcourt. Martin collected numerous awards in singles, doubles, and mixed doubles (with Lauretta) between 1919 and 1931. He won singles at the Sunningdale Country Club in 1920. It was the first time that event was held at Scarsdale. (Note: New York Tribune, Sep 15, 1918, pt. 2, p. 1. The club moved from Mt. Vernon to Scarsdale in 1918. Only women's singles and mixed doubles were held in 1919.) Martin won the singles and doubles championships at both Lake George and Lake Mohonk in 1924. His opponents included future Hall of Famers Fred Alexander, Jean Borotra, Francis Hunter, Gerald Patterson, Vincent Richards, (Note: New York Tribune, Oct 1, 1917, p. 13; May 8, 1919, p. 22 (top-center box). The schoolboy prodigy and seasoned veteran were clubmates at University Heights. The New York Times, Apr 4, 1919, p. 12 (opening sentence). Richards simultaneously belonged to two tennis clubs. The Sun, Oct 6, 1919, p. 20; The New York Times, Oct 19, 1919, sec. 10, p. 6 (2nd column); New York Herald, Oct 4, 1920, p. 11. They were now on opposing teams.) Bill Tilden, John Van Ryn, and Marie Wagner. (Note: New York Tribune, Oct 20, 1919, p. 13. He competed against Watson Washburn in a non-sanctioned interclub tournament.) Martin was a doubles partner and longtime clubmate of newspaper columnist Franklin P. Adams, who wrote "Baseball's Sad Lexicon." (Note: "Diary". New York Tribune, Jul 2, 1919, p. 10. Adams wrote that Mrs. Martin, an event volunteer, served him cake, sandwiches, and tea for refreshments.) (Note: Bridgeport Telegram, Jul 5, 1924, p. 8. The Martins topped Adams and Mayme McDonald in New Canaan, Connecticut. Newspapers.com.) (Note: New York Tribune, Jul 4, 1915, pt. 2, p. 4; Jul 1, 1917, pt. 2, p. 3 & Jul 2, 1917, p. 11; Jun 30, 1919, p. 12; Jul 6, 1920, p. 12; May 22, 1922, p. 9; The New York Times, Jun 23, 1923, p. 7; May 4, 1924, sec. 10, p. 6. Both played in these tournaments at University Heights.) He was also a teammate of 14-year-old Vincent Richards, the reigning national boys' champion.

Martin and Bill Tilden competed in the same tournament at least fifteen times, including the U.S. National Championships of 1920–21 and 1924. The latter was played at Forest Hills Tennis Stadium and on its outside courts from August 25 to September 2, 1924. Martin's second-round opponent was former co-world No. 1 Gerald Patterson of Australia. A two-day rain delay followed the third set. Forty-one-year-old Martin won a set but lost the match, 4–6, 4–6, 9–7, 0–6. He later competed in four consecutive Veterans' Singles Championships (ages 45 and over) at Forest Hills from 1928 to 1931.

He was a leading singles and doubles player at both the University Heights (Bronx, N.Y.) (Note: New York Tribune, Mar 22, 1919, p. 19; Oct 24, 1919, p. 15. Its courts were along the banks of the Harlem River, on Harlem River Terrace (now I-87).) and County (Hartsdale, N.Y.) clubs. Martin was caught up in the fallout of a USLTA ruling in 1924. It prohibited players from writing for profit after a specified date. The distinction between amateurism and professionalism was hotly contested from February to December 1924. Martin declined to sign a protest petition, but came out "in favor of a reconsideration of the matter" amid widespread discord. (Note: Compact summary: The USLTA delegates strengthened an existing rule on Feb 2, 1924. It stated that active players who were paid to write about tennis would lose their amateur status, effective Jan 1, 1925. The delegates voted in blocs and easily approved the motion (47,196 to 6,250). It would have most deeply affected Bill Tilden, followed distantly by Vincent Richards. Strong opposition came from the influential S. Wallis Merrihew, fans, and writers. Twelve of the top twenty-five ranked players in the NY metro area, among others, signed a petition. It rebuked the new rule, which redefined amateurism. Walter Merrill Hall (#11) and Martin (#18) did not sign the petition. They instead co-wrote a letter urging reconsideration of the rule.—President George W. Wightman appointed a special committee to resolve the matter. It consisted of Arthur Hellen, Merrihew, Mersereau, and Tilden. However, this led to a 2–2 stalemate. Consequently, this deadlocked group broadened the negotiating body by adding three uncommitted individuals: Devereux Milburn, George W. Pepper, and Grantland Rice. The USLTA's Executive Committee accepted their report on Dec 13. This greatly revised version was unanimously approved by the delegates on Jan 7, 1925. The alternative was to resume hostilities. Link: Internet Archive.) He often acted as the referee for women's matches. (Note: New York Evening Post, Jun 19, 1925, p. 14; The New York Times, Jun 19, 1925, p. 15 (2nd column). Helene Pollak Falk nearly collapsed during the semi-finals. Referee Martin assisted her off the court.) He organized youth tournaments while serving on the Briarcliff Lodge Sports Club committee. (Note: "Exhibition". The New York Times, Apr 13, 1925, p. 16 (bottom center). Herbert Bowman and Martin came back from near defeat to win at Briarcliff.)

Ranked tennis players were surveyed for a USLTA magazine article in December 1929. They were asked, "Do you favor playing over all net cord shots, which occur during rallies?" Martin replied, "The outcome of many a match has been decided (more or less) by a net cord shot—for instance, Tilden and Johnston—No good sport enjoys winning in this way—and I don't believe the gallery enjoys it, either. We would not think of stopping a match in the middle of an important point and tossing a coin to see who wins the point. That is about what a net cord shot amounts to." This alluded to a critical play in the Tilden–Johnston final at Newport in 1919.

The Westchester County Tennis League was formed with six clubs in 1926. It staged the annual Paul Martin singles on eighty-four occasions between 1932 and 2019. (Note: The perpetual trophy is engraved with the names of winners from every year in that span, except 1942–45. The event was canceled due to low registration amid the COVID-19 pandemic in 2020. Players with at least three singles titles are Bailey Brown, John Mangan, Melvin Partridge, Dick Squires, and Bill Tully.) This event was initiated by player and executive Fenimore Cady in June 1932. The winners had their names engraved on the base of a trophy cup (Note: The News (Bronxville), Aug 23, 1912, p. 9; The Scarsdale Inquirer, Aug 17, 1912, p. 1; Sep 9, 1932, p. 1; Oct 7, 1932, p. 14; Sep 22, 1933, p. 11. This indirectly related context serves to avoid confusion. The County Tennis Club's men's singles champs had their names engraved on an entirely different memorial cup starting in 1932. This cup was last mentioned in print on Sep 22, 1933. It was repurposed from a runner-up trophy Martin won at Harlem (1923). Incidentally, the County club's first tournament (restricted to members) took place in 1912. News.hrvh.org.) donated by Lauretta in 1934. She and Paul both played in the "Nationals" (US Open). (Note: Both Martins played singles at the 1921 "Nationals." It is an unusual occurrence for a married couple. This distinction was shared by Hobart/Schultz (1905), Niles/Pitkin (1920–21), Chapin/Hosmer (1926), Van Ryn/Gladman (1931–37), Hopman/Hall (1938), Kovacs/Wolfenden (1941), Cooke/Palfrey (1945), Hoad/Staley (1956), Susman/Hantze (1964), Graebner/Caldwell (1964–65), Bowrey/Turner (1969), Curtis/Eisel (1969–70), Reid/Melville (1975–76), Lloyd/Evert (1979, 81, 83–85), Borg/Simionescu (1980), Monfils/Svitolina (2021, 23–26), & Shevchenko/Potapova (2024).) They regularly teamed up in mixed doubles. His WWI poster was originally displayed in the main gallery of the Tennis Hall of Fame. (Note: This serigraph (silkscreen print) has been exhibited periodically at various locations since 1965. The museum's archives include a letter from Sec.-Treas. Henry Heffernan, dated Dec 3, 1965. It mentions the artwork's original display location. The Day, Aug 28, 1983, p. C4. "Tennis Hall Does More than List Stars.") Its gift shop offered reproductions on coffee mugs (Note: Dimensions: height 3.75", width 3.25" (without handle). The Hall of Fame logo is on the back.) and postcards.

Martin was a constant presence on the competitive circuit for over twenty years, despite never reaching an elite level. His death was duly noted in the table of contents of American Lawn Tennis. The following list reflects that status. It includes only open or invitational tournaments sanctioned by the United States Lawn Tennis Association, with one exception. These results largely determined player rankings and who qualified for the "Nationals." Martin reached 30 of these finals, which are categorized below by the hosting club.

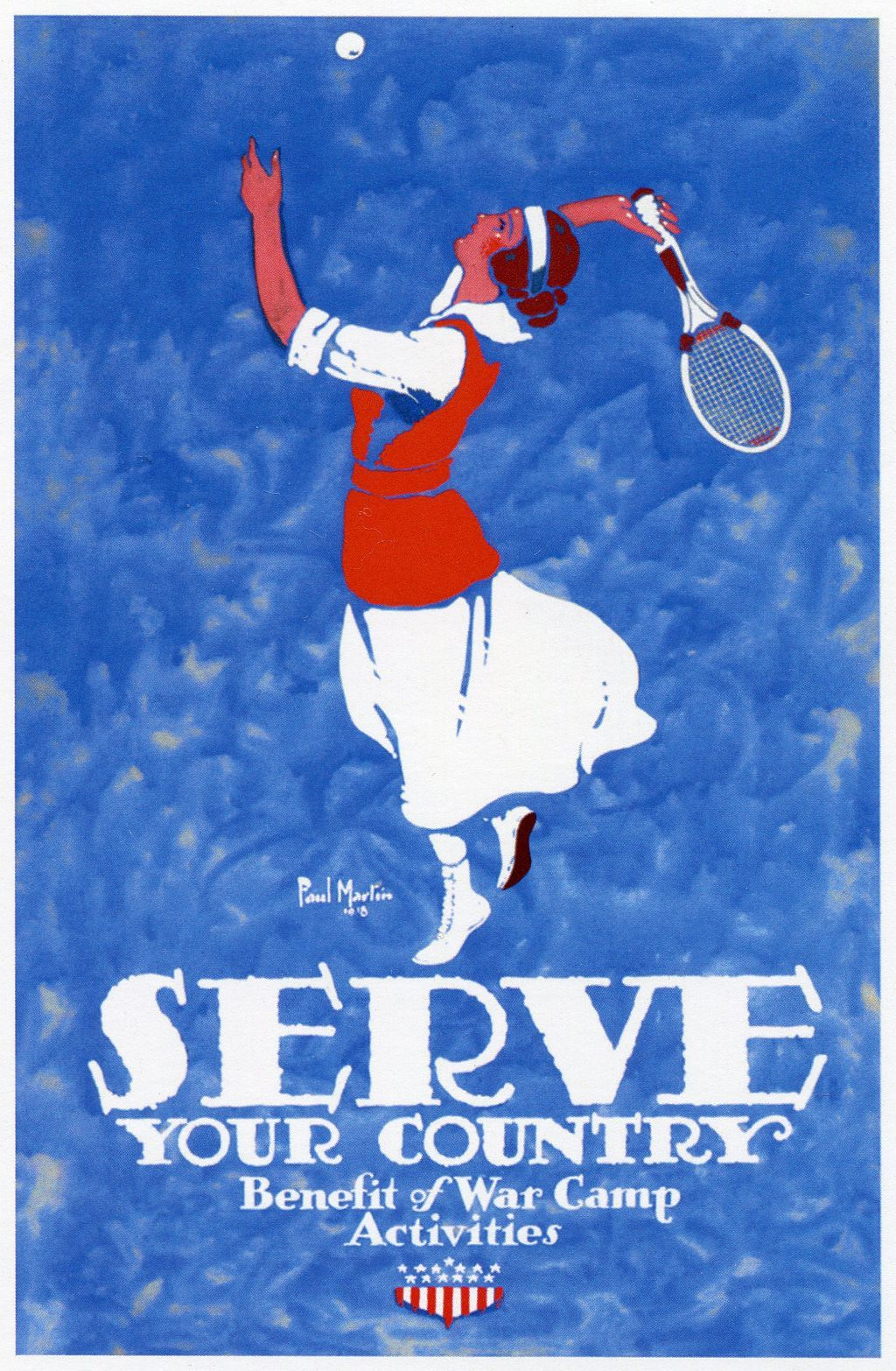
Serving in style: Postcard version of the silkscreen print

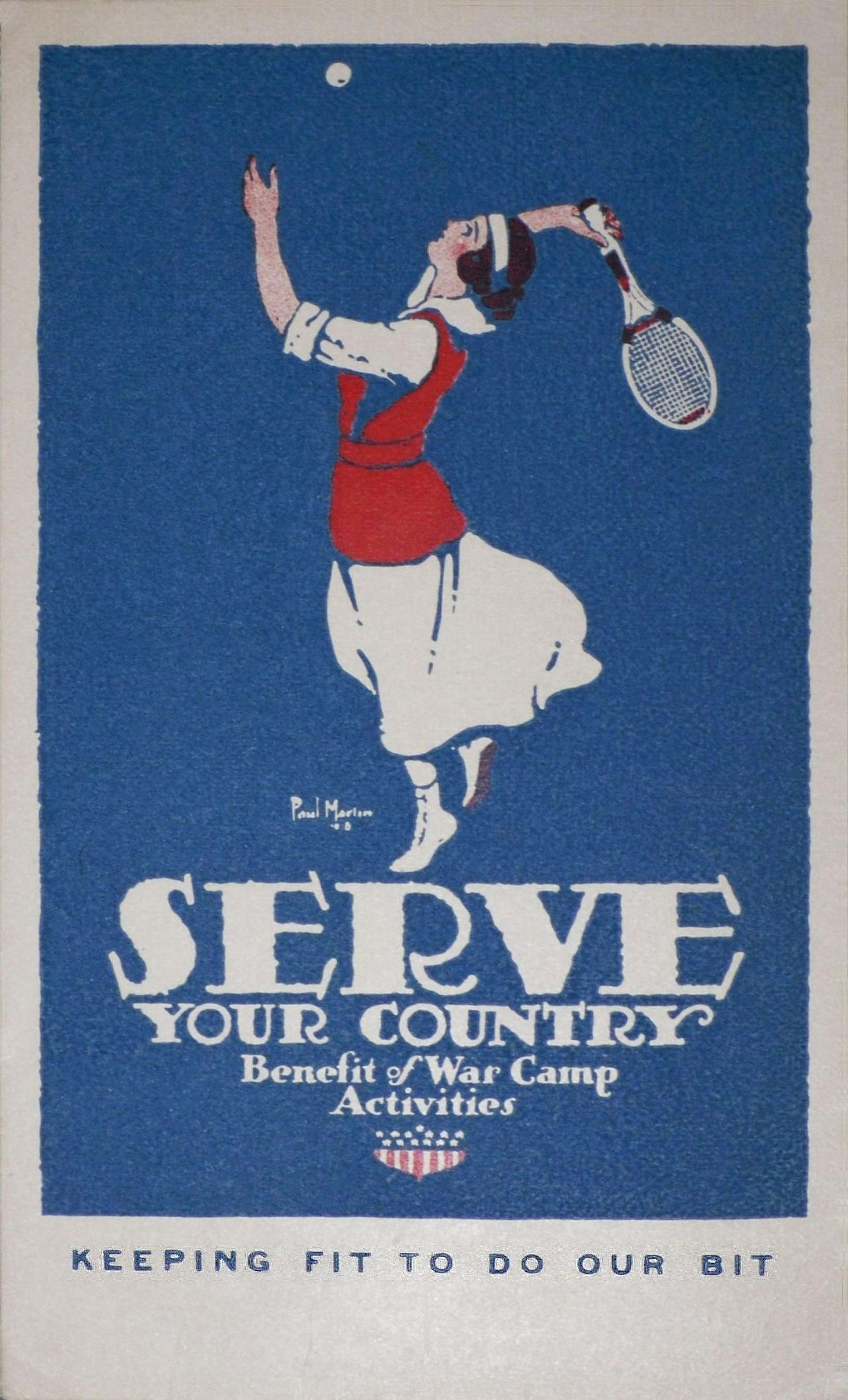
Keeping fit to do our bit. Artist's proof card. Signed and dated in print, 1918.

US Open singles
1920 (1R)
1921 (2R)
1924 (2R)

=== Wins (12) ===
==== Singles ====
- 1920: Sunningdale CC (Scarsdale, N.Y.)
- 1924: Lake George Tennis Club (Warren County)
- 1924: Lake Mohonk TC (Ulster County)

==== Consolation Singles ====
- 1915: Merriewold TC (Sullivan County) (Note: Cachet. This cover explains why the Times and Tribune, confusingly, referred to him as being from Mamakating on Aug 16, 1915. Commons. The Sun, Aug 13, 1916, sec. 2, p. 2. Bklyn. Daily Eagle, Sep 3, 1916, sec. 3 (resorts), p. 6. Excerpt: "Martin of the University Heights Tennis Club, who had been picked to win the tournament [at Merriewold Park in 1916]." His name and club are correctly tied together. Newspapers.com.) (Note: It was a non-championship final, unlike the other twenty-nine. Nonetheless, the winner still received an award.)

==== Doubles ====
- 1922: New York Athletic Club
- 1924: Lake George
- 1924: Lake Mohonk
- 1925: Lake George (Note: American Lawn Tennis, Aug 5, 1930, p. 364. No tournaments were held from 1926 to 1929. HathiTrust.)
- 1925: West Side TC (for veterans over age 39)
- 1930: Lake George
- 1931: Lake George

==== Mixed Doubles ====
- 1920: New York TC (with Lauretta; for married couples) (Note: American Lawn Tennis, May 15, 1920, p. 99. There were three events.)

=== Runners-up (18) ===
==== Singles ====
- 1919: Woodmere Club (L.I., N.Y.)
- 1922: Essex County CC (N.J.); Powelton Club (Newburgh, N.Y.)
- 1923: Amackassin Club (Yonkers); Harlem TC (Manhattan) (Note: The Evening Telegram, May 20, 1923, p. 10. Martin is referred to as "the University Heights veteran." This tie-in corrects an error made by two other dailies on that date.)
- 1924: Oritani Field Club (Hackensack, N.J.)
- 1924: Stamford Yacht Club (Conn.)
- 1925: Lake George; Lake Mohonk
- 1930: Lake George

==== Doubles ====
- 1921: Greenwich CC (Conn.); Milford Field Club (Pa.)
- 1925: Lake Mohonk
- 1926: South Yonkers TC
- 1931: Lake Mohonk

==== Mixed Doubles ====
- 1921: Milford (Pa.) (Note: His usual mixed doubles partner, Lauretta, could not play due to a rare scheduling conflict. She had a first-round singles match at the "Nationals" on Aug 15. The New York Times, Jun 27, 1924, p. 22 (5th column). His partner was Helen Simpson, a friend. The New York Times, Jun 12, 1923, p. 17; Lake George Mirror, Aug 16, 1924, p. 9; Jul 18, 1925, p. 3; Brooklyn Daily Eagle, Aug 2, 1925, p. F2 ("Brooklyn Guests"); American Lawn Tennis, Jun 20, 1930, p. 166. He and Simpson worked together on several tournament committees.)
- 1925: Lake George (with Lauretta)
- 1930: Lake George (with Lauretta)

Notes: These are the known finals. Results for mixed doubles were often not recorded. Martin also won many other tournaments, which were open only to members of the County Tennis Club in Hartsdale. The Martins sometimes played on the circuit during road trips.

=== U.S. National Championships ===
His tournament appearances are listed, along with the final rounds reached. Men's singles (3): 1920-1R, 1921-2R, 1924-2R. Lauretta played in the women's draw: 1921-1R. Veterans' singles—ages 45 and over—(4): 1928-4R, 1929-4R, 1930-3R, 1931-3R. Interest in the event later declined. It became a seniors' division of the US Open in 1968.

=== University Heights Tennis Club ===
Martin was a longtime committee and playing member who lived in the immediate area. He competed in the club's annual North Side Championships from 1913 to 1929 (except 1914 and 1926). These open events attracted a large number of entries. Martin reached the semifinals in 1913, 1924, and 1928. Singles (13): 1915-5R, 1916-3R, 1917-2R, 1918-4R, 1919-5R, 1920-3R, 1922-3R, 1923-4R, 1924-SF/6R, 1925-3R, 1927-3R, 1928-SF/6R, 1929-2R. Doubles (6): 1913-SF/4R, 1915-3R, 1916-3R, 1919-1R, 1920-3R, 1921-1R. 1922-disc. Mixed doubles: 1923-1R, 1924-2R.

=== Memberships ===
These spans were compiled from periodical and newspaper accounts: Maplewood FC (N.J.), 1909–12. University Heights TC (Bronx), 1913–26. (Note: He might have joined the club between Oct and Dec 1912. However, newspaper documentation is unlikely to exist because the tennis season was winding down.) County TC of Westchester (Hartsdale), 1926–32. Martin played on the circuit for 23 consecutive years, 1909–31. (Note: New York Tribune, May 17, 1914, pt. 2, p. 6. "Bronx Court Title." Martin's leanest year on the circuit was 1914. Cachet ("Other information"). This postmarked, handwritten envelope explains the reasoning. Commons.) His wife was an active player between 1914 and 1931. His older brother Ralph participated in tournaments in 1909, 1911, and 1921–22. The brothers were doubles partners at Woodmere in 1911.

=== Featured Match ===
Name/Date: Eastern New York State Tennis Championships, June 27, 1925. It was hosted by four different clubs from 1913 to 1926. Excerpts from a firsthand account by sportswriter Allison Danzig:

[Bill] Tilden and Strachan advanced from the semi-finals of the doubles by putting out Alfred D. Hammett and Paul Martin at 6–4, 5–7, 6–1, 6–3. ... It required some of the best tennis that Tilden has played here all week before the Philadelphians were able to overcome the New York pair. Hammett and Martin were always contenders, except in the third set when they slumped badly, and in order to hold them off, Tilden constantly found it necessary to invade his partner's territory and play the opposing pair single-handed. ... There was nothing to choose between the two teams in the first and second sets. In the third set, Hammett and Martin went to pieces as Tilden became rampant and raked their court with placement drives and volleys. After the Philadelphians had gained a commanding lead, the New York pair allowed the set to go without making much effort, preferring to save their strength for the next chapter. But after the rest period, Tilden returned to the courts to play perhaps his best tennis of the match. Both Martin and Hammett fought with everything they had, and their teamwork was splendidly coordinated, but all counted for nought against the individual brilliance of [world No. 1] Tilden. (Note: The New York Times, Sep 30, 1921, p. 12. Hammett and Martin were clubmates at University Heights. They sometimes partnered in doubles. Deford, Frank. Big Bill Tilden, 1976, p. 221. Donald Strachan of Philadelphia was one of Tilden's protégés. Internet Archive.)

== Photo gallery ==
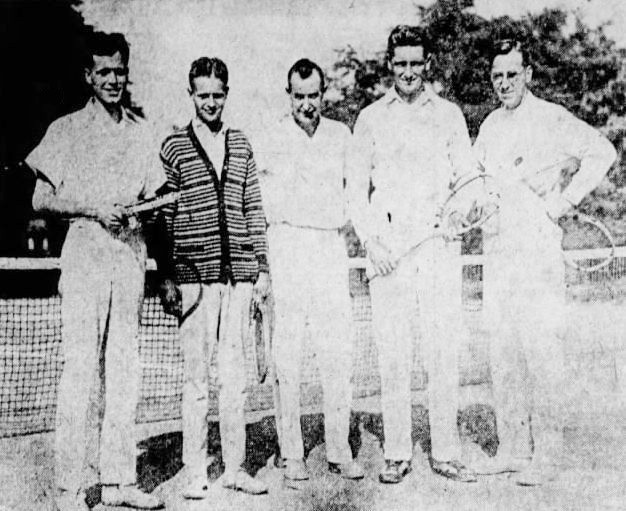
Martin is second from right. The two doubles finalists and chairman are on a court in Yonkers, 1926.

Martin received the winner's check from Schain in 1931. A poster of the inset was in use until 1937.

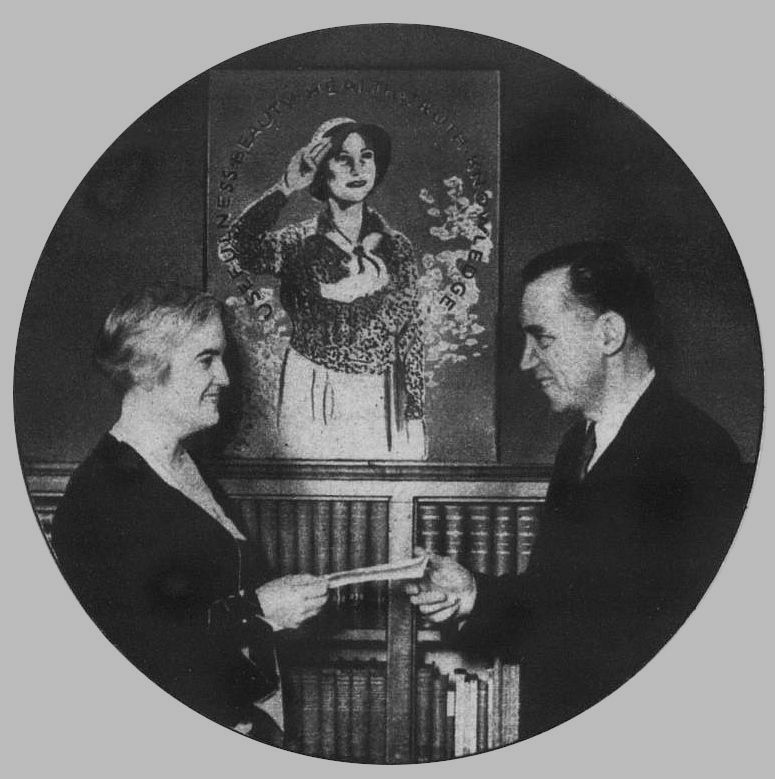
Girl Scouts' headquarters, 1931. The painting was later superimposed onto the bookshelf.

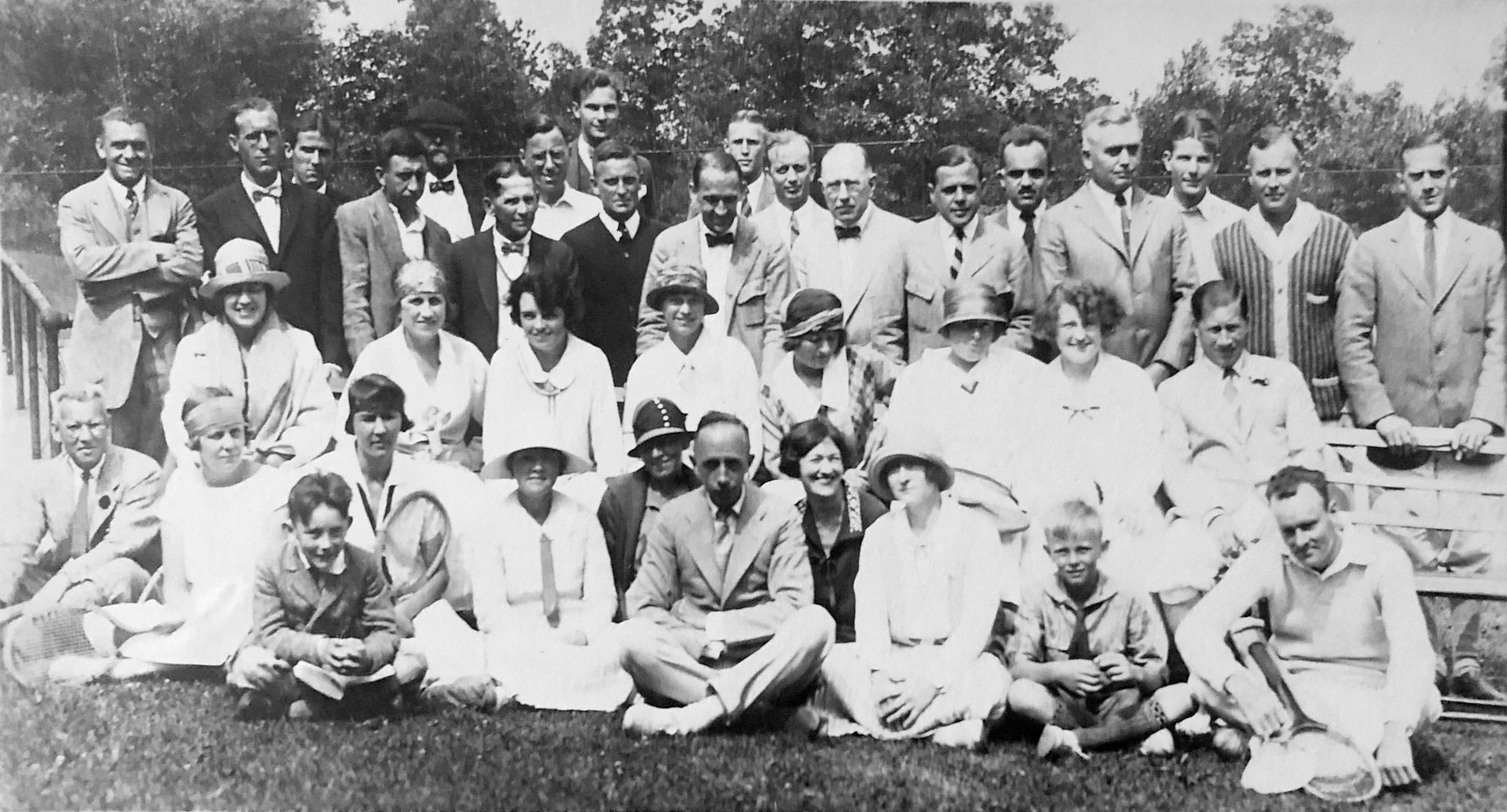
A tournament in progress at Lake Mohonk, 1924. Paul (7th from top left) won the singles and doubles titles. Lauretta (2nd from bottom left) was a mixed doubles semi-finalist.

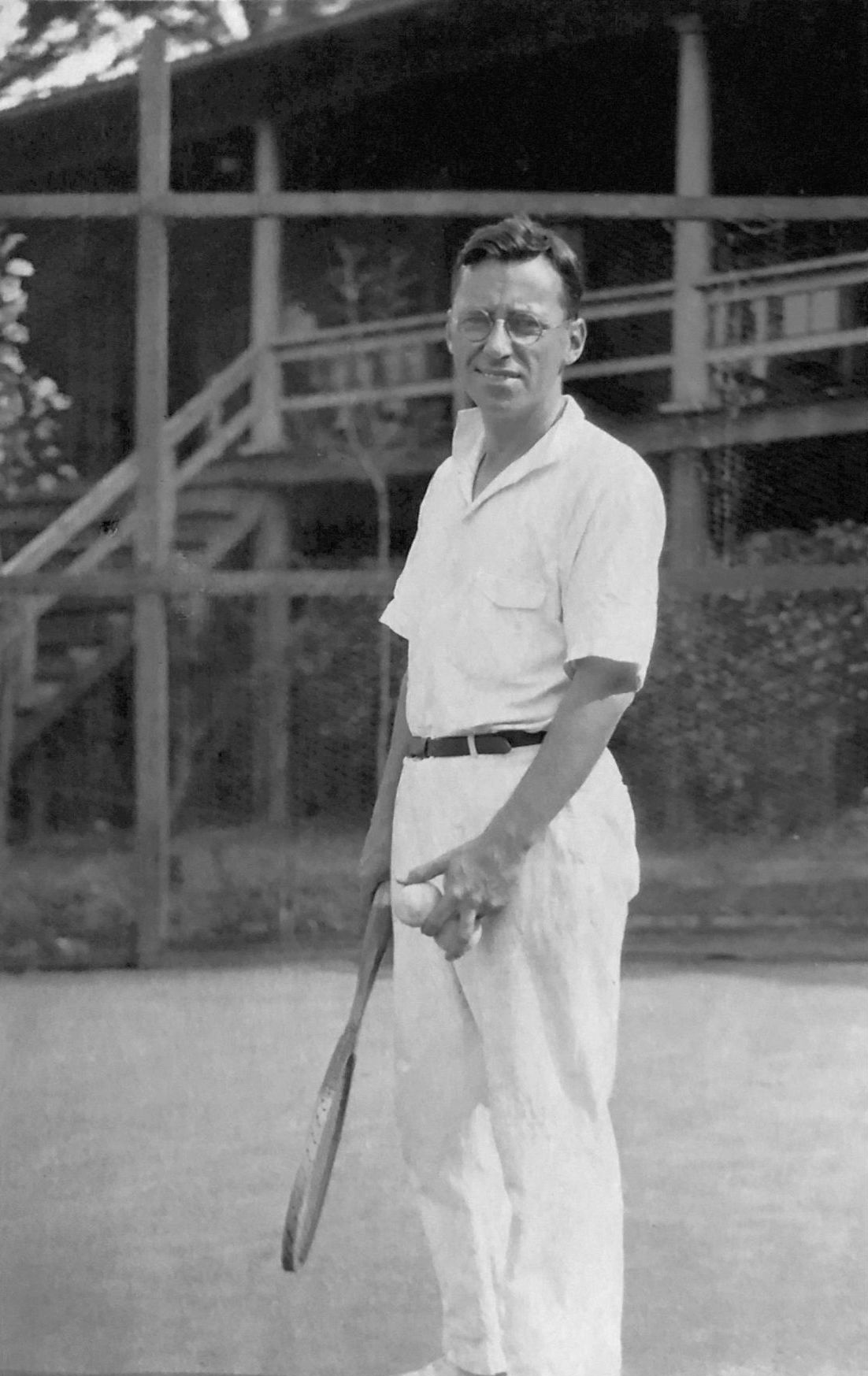
He is posing on a tennis court while vacationing.
