= Amackassin Club Invitation =

Defunct tennis tournament
- Founded: 1890; 136 years ago
- Abolished: 1937; 89 years ago
- Location: Yonkers, New York, United States
- Venue: Amackassin Club
- Surface: Clay

The Amackassin Club Invitation was a men's and women's clay court tennis tournament founded in 1890. It was played at the Amackassin Club, Yonkers, New York, from 1890 to 1936. Its hosted events were all sanctioned by the United States Lawn Tennis Association.

== History ==
The historic Amackassin Club is a privately owned pool and tennis club in Northwest Yonkers. It was founded as the Yonkers Lawn Tennis Club in 1888. The club later changed its name to the Amackassin Club in February 1897. In September 1888, the club staged its first tennis tournament for members.

In 1890, the club started an Invitation tennis tournament which was open to its members as well as members from the Park Hill Tennis Club, also in Yonkers. The men's singles was won by Victor Elting. The women's singles was won by Edith Elting.

In 1891, the tournament competition increased as it was open to “all players in Yonkers and vicinity”. The tournament was held at the Yonkers Lawn Tennis Club's new location at the corner of Palisade and Glenwood where there were now three courts. The events were Gentleman’s Singles, Ladies Singles, Gentlemen’s Doubles and Mixed Doubles. The entrance fee for each person, in each event, was 50 cents.

In 1892, the competition at the Amackassin Invitational became even greater as The Hudson River Tennis Tournament was held at the Yonkers Lawn Tennis Club so the two tournamaments were superimposed. The tournament was now open to all “Tennis experts from the entire Hudson Valley”. In 1894, the annual Hudson River Tennis Tournament would also be held for a second time at the Yonkers Lawn Tennis Club which would include a number of well-known players from Clubs up the river. In 1900, the annual Hudson River Tennis Tournament would be held at the Amackassin Club (formerly the YLTC) for a third time. All members of Clubs belonging to the Hudson River Association were invited to play. The entrance fee was $1 for each player in each event. In 1901, and going forward, the tournament included players from the Queens, Brooklyn and NJ. As time went on, the tournament grew larger drawing the top players in the north east.

The tournaments were superimposed with the Eastern New York State championships in 1917, 1920–24.

International Tennis Hall of Famers that played in the Amackassin Invitational

- Francis Hunter appeared in three finals winning the Singles one time and the Doubles twice.
- Vincent Richards, a Yonkers resident lost in the 1920 Men’s Singles finals but came back to win the 1921 finals.
- Elisabeth Moore appeared in eight finals with a record of 7-1. She won three Women’s Singles, three Women’s Doubles as well as one Mixed Doubles. She lost once in the Women’s Doubles
- Marie Wagner appeared in twelve finals. She was 3-2 in Women’s Singles, 4-0 in Women’s Doubles and 1-2 in Mixed Doubles

Marie Wagner later moved to Yonkers and became a member of the Amackassin club where she won four Club Singles Titles.

Additional Events

An exhibition match was played at the Amackassin Club between current world champion Bill Tilden and Yonkers native Vincent Richards in 1921. The revenue raised went to the American Committee for Devastated France. The following account was given in The New York Times. Excerpts: "Held before a gallery that taxed the club's seating accommodations, and filled every vantage point about the courts ... The crowd filled the street overlooking the courts and fringed roofs of adjoining houses."

== Finals ==
=== Men's singles ===
- The denoted editions were known as the Eastern New York State Tennis Championships.

(incomplete roll)

Year	Winners	Runners-up	Score
1890	(United States) Victor Elting	(United States) Arthur Runyon	4-6, 6-2, 6-2
1891	(United States) Arthur Runyon	(United States) Schuyler Bogart	6-1, 6-0, 6-2
1892	(United States) Carman S. Runyon	(United States) Valentine G. Hall	
1893	(United States) Edwin P. Fischer	(United States) Mr. C Harmstaad	6-4, 1-6, 6-2
1894	(United States) Charles E. Sands	(United States) Arthur Runyon	6-4, 6-4, 7-5
1895-99	No Tournament		
1900	(United States) Hobart D. Betts	(United States) Henry D. Batt	6-4, 6-2, 6-0
1901	(United States) Calhoun Craigin	(United States) Stephen F. Thayer	7-2, 6-2, 6-1
1902	(United States) Calhoun Craigin (2)	(United States) J.L. Robertson Jr.	6-2, 6-3, 6-2
1903	(United States) Harry W. Mollenhauer	(United States) Frederick C. Anderson	6-0, 11-9, 6-4
1904	(United States) Hugh Tallant	(United States) Louis Northrop	6-1, 6-2, 6-3
1905	No Tournament		
1906	No Tournament		
1907	(United States) Gustave F. Touchard		
1908	(United States) Gustave F. Touchard (2)	(United States) Walter Merrill Hall	6-4, 7-5, 2-1
1909	(United States) Gustave F. Touchard (3)	(United States) Fred Inman	7–5, 6–1, 1–6, 6–1
1910	(United States) Nathaniel H. Bundy	(United States) William Rosenbaum	6-4, 6-4, 1-6, 6-4
1911	(United States) Fred Baggs	(United States) S. Howard Voshell	6-4, 4-6, 4-6, 6-1, 6-3
1912	(United States) Fred Baggs (2)	(United States) Joseph Condon	4-6, 6-1, 4-6, 6-4, 6-4
1913	(United States) Fred Baggs (3)	(United States) Ingo Hartman	6-3, 5-7, 6-4, 6-2
1914	(United States) Francis Hunter	(United States) W.S. Andrews	6-3, 6-2, 5-7, 6-2
1915	(United States) Vanderbilt Ward	(United States) L. H. Crowley	6-2, 6-3 (2-out-of-3)
1916	(United States) King Smith	(United States) Allen Behr	7-5, 3-6, 6-2, 6-2
1917 •	(United States) Charles Chambers	(United States) Ingo Hartman	
1918	No Tournament		
1919	(Japan) Ichiya Kumagae	(United States) S. Howard Voshell	6-2. 6-2, 6-1
1920 •	(Japan) Ichiya Kumagae (2)	(United States) Vincent Richards	6–1, 8–6, 6–8, 6–4
1921 •	(United States) Vincent Richards	(United States) Alfred Hammett	6–0, 6–1, 8–6
1922 •	(United States) George King	(United States) Elliott H. Binzen	5-7, 6-2, 6-4, 6-2
1923 •	(United States) Percy Kynaston	(United States) Paul Martin	7–5, 3–6, 7–5, 6–3
1924 •	(United States) Elliott H. Binzen	(United States) Edward Fiebleman	6-3, 2-4, 6-4, 7-5
1925-30	No Tournament		
1931	(United States) Melvin Partridge	(United States) Eugene McCauliff	5–7, 6–2, 6–1, 6–4
1932	(United States) Melvin Partridge (2)	(United States) Percy Kynaston	6–2, 6–1
1933	(United States) John Pitman	(United States) Edward Jenkins	2–6, 13–11, 6–4
1934	(United States) Melvin Partridge (3)	(United States) Edward Fiebleman	6-3, 6-4, 7-5
1935	(United States) Melvin Partridge (4)	(United States) Frank Bowden	6–3, 4–6, 6–4, 4–6, 6–3
1936	(United States) Frank Bowden	(United States) Leonard Hartman	
1937	Amackassin Invitational Discontinued		

=== Men's doubles ===
(incomplete roll)

Year	Winners	Runners-up	Score
1890	(United States) Schuyler Bogart (United States) Arthur Runyon	(United States) Victor M. Elting (United States) Henry M. Baird Jr.	8-6, 7-5
1891	(United States) Schuyler Bogart (United States) Arthur S. Runyon	(United States) H. Thayer (United States) S.M. Warnock	6-1, 6-3, 6-2
1892	(United States) Carman S. Runyon (United States) Arthur S. Runyon	(United States) S.A. Bogart (United States) Henry M. Baird Jr.	6-4, 6-1, 6-3
1893	(United States) Edwin P. Fischer (United States) G. I. Burr	(United States) S.A. Bogart (United States) Walter E. Hodgman	7-9, 6-3, 6-3, 1-6, 6-1
1894	(United States) J.C.W Brooks (United States) R.P. Davis	(United States) H.D. Betts (United States) H.A. Waldron	6-1, 6-3, 4-6, 6-2
1900	(United States) C.S. Batt (United States) C.D. Millard	(United States) J. L. Robertson Jr (United States) David Todd	6-2, 6-1,6-8, 6-4
1901	(United States) Calhoun Craigin (United States) Bostwick	(United States) Hugh Tallant (United States) C.C. Kelley	6-3, 3-6, 6-8, 6-3, 6-2
1902	(United States) Calhoun Craigin (United States) C.C. Kelley	(United States) Harry Mollenhauer (United States) Louis Ledoux	By Default
1903	(United States) Frederick C. Anderson (United States) Samuel C. Westfall	(United States) J.L. Robertson Jr (United States) David Todd	6-1, 6-3, 6-2
1904	(United States) Smith (United States) L. Northrop	(United States) Hugh Tallant (United States) E.A. Jova	6-4, 9-7, 4-6, 8-6
1905	No Tournament		
1906	No Tournament		
1907	(United States) Hugh Tallant (United States) W.D. Lyon	(United States) J.C. Tomilson (United States) Rolfe Floyd	6-2, 6-1, 6-1
1908	(United States) Walter Merrill Hall (United States) L. Millens Burt	(United States) James L. Robinson (United States) David Todd	11-9, 7-5, 6-3
1909	(United States) O.M.Bostwick (United States) Calhoun Craigin	(United States) Edgar F. Leo (United States) Benjamin M. Phillips	7–5, 4–6, 6–2, 6–4
1910	(United States) Nathaniel H. Bundy (United States) L.H. Fitch	(United States) S. Howard Voshell (United States) Julio Steinaeher	0-6, 11-13, 6-2, 6-3, 6-2
1911	(United States) S. Howard Voshell (United States) Fred Baggs	(United States) Ralph Baggs (United States) George S. Groesbeck	6-3, 7-9, 6-4, 6-1
1912	(United States) S. Howard Voshell (United States) Fred Baggs	(United States) R.L. James (United States) Albert Ostendorf	6-4, 3-6, 6-3, 6-3
1913	(United States) J.H. Steinkempf (United States) Ingo Hartmann	(United States) S. Howard Voshell (United States) Fred Baggs	
1914	(United States) S. Howard Voshell (United States) Fred Baggs	(United States) Albert Ostendorf (United States) Ralph Baggs	6-1, 4-6, 7-5, 6-4
1915	(United States) E.H. Henderson (United States) E.H. James	(United States) W.J. Toussaint (United States) P.F. Fuller	6-3, 6-3, 6-3
1916	(United States) Elliott Binzen (United States) Ingo Hartmann	(United States) L.H. Croley (United States) Harry Bassford	8-6, 6-3, 6-4
1917	Finals Allen Behr & Leon Croley vs. Ingo Hartmann & H. Bassford		
1918	No Tournament		
1919	(Japan) Ichiya Kumagae (United States) Francis Hunter	(United States) Elliott Binzen (United States) Embree Henderson	6-3, 6-3, 6-3
1920	(Japan) Ichiya Kumagae (United States) Francis Hunter	(United States) Frederick C. Anderson (United States) Ben Letson	7-5, 5-7, 3-6, 6-3, 6-2
1921	(United States) Vanderbilt B. Ward (United States) Ben Letson	(United States) Leonard Beekman (United States) Albert Ostendorf	Walkover

=== Women's singles ===
(incomplete roll)

Year	Winners	Runners-up	Score
1890	(United States) Edith Elting	(United States) Miss Hale	4-6, 6-2, 6-2
1891	(United States) Miss Temple	(United States) Miss Moore	7-5, 6-3, 3-6, 7-5
1892	(United States) Miss Scofield	(United States) Miss Cahill	By Default
1893	(United States) Miss Belle Silver	(United States) Bessie Humason	6-0, 6-0
1894	(United States) Miss Augustus Bradley	(United States) Miss Mabel Ferris	3-6, 8-10, 6-4, 7-5, 6-1
1900	(United States) Mrs. W.H. Pouch	(United States) Miss Ewings	6-1, 6-3
1901	(United States) Marie Matthiessen	(United States) Miss Atkins	4-6, 6-2, 6-4
1904	(United States) Mrs. Clark	(United States) Mabel Benedict	6–4, 6–3
1905	No Tournament		
1906	No Tournament		
1907	(United States) Elisabeth Moore	(United States) Marie Wagner	6–0, 6–4
1908	No Record		
1909	(United States) Elisabeth Moore (2)	(United States) Natalie Browning	6–0, 7–5
1910	(United States) Elisabeth Moore (3)	(United States) Natalie Browning	By Default
1911	(United States) Nora Meyer Schmitz	(United States) Gertrude Hill	6–1, 6–2
1912	(United States) Adelaide Browning	(United States) Nora Meyer Schmitz	6–2, 6–4
1913	(United States) Marie Wagner	(United States) Mrs. A. Lehman	6-1, 6-3
1914	(United States) Clare Cassell	(United States) Marie Wagner	6–4, 6–3
1915	(United States) Marie Wagner (2)	(United States) Natalie Browning	6–1, 6–3
1916	(United States) Marie Wagner (3)	(United States) Helene Pollak	6–1, 6–0
1917	(United States) Miss E. Means	(United States) Mrs. M. B. Fuff	6-8, 6-3, 6-3
1918	No Tournament		
1920	(United States) Mrs. Edward Lynch	(United States) Mrs. Benjamin F. Briggs	8-6, 6-4

=== Women's doubles ===
(incomplete roll)

Year	Winners	Runners-up	Score
1892	(United States) Miss Scofield (United States) Miss Morgan	(United States) Miss Hale (United States) Miss Kate Atkins	7-5, 6-4
1893	(United States) (United States)	(United States) (United States)	
1894	(United States) Miss Ferris (United States) Miss Mabel Ferris	(United States) Miss Bertha Strang (United States) Miss Kate Atkins	6-2, 2-6, 6-4
1900	(United States) Mrs. W.H Pouch (United States) Miss Marie Matthiessen	(United States) Miss Pauline Lowerre (United States) Miss Miriam Birdseys	6-1, 6-1
1904	(United States) Miss Elizabeth Elting (United States) Miss Mabel Benedict	(United States) Miss Maclay (United States) Miss Langdon Bellows	8-6, 6-2
1905	No Tournament		
1906	No Tournament		
1907	(United States) Elisabeth Moore (United States) Mrs. W.H. Pouch	(United States) Mrs. George L. Chapman (United States) Miss Clover Boldt	6-0, 6-8, 64
1908	No Record		
1909	(United States) Elisabeth Moore (United States) Miss Bunce	(United States) Miss H.H. Bundick (United States) Miss Martin	
1910	(United States) Elisabeth Moore (United States) Mrs. S.F Weaver	(United States) Edna Widley (United States) Natalie Browning	By Default
1911	(United States) Nora Meyer Schmitz (United States) Mrs. Humphries	(United States) Miss Fish (United States) Edith A. Bagg	6-2, 12-10
1912	(United States) Miss Clara Kuproff (United States) Marie Wagner	(United States) Elisabeth Moore (United States) Mrs. S.F Weaver	6-2, 6-3
1913	(United States) Mrs. Weaver (United States) Marie Wagner	(United States) Clare Cassell (United States) Mrs. Beard	6-0, 6-3
1914	(United States) Clare Cassell (United States) Marie Wagner	(United States) Mrs J.O. Blanchard (United States) Isabel de Gersdorff	6–1, 6–2
1915	(United States) Mrs. Percy Wilbourn (United States) Marie Wagner	(United States) Miss Holder (United States) Mrs Humphries	4-6, 6-2, 6-4
1916	(United States) Mrs. Percy Wilbourn (United States) Marie Wagner	(United States) Mrs. Waring (United States) Mrs. Henderson	6-1, 6-4
1918	No Tournament		

=== Mixed doubles ===
(incomplete roll)

Year	Winners	Runners-up	Score
1890	(United States) Arthur Runyon (United States) Miss Edith Elting	(United States) Victor Elting (United States) Miss Atkins	6-3, 6-3
1891	(United States) Mr. A. Runyon (United States) Miss Elting	(United States) Mr. Bogart (United States) Miss Atkins	7-5, 8-6, 5-7, ?,? . and
1892	(United States) Miss Hale (United States) Denny Brereton	(United States) Miss Temple (United States) E. H. Thayer	7-9, 7-5, 6-3
1893	(United States) Edwin P. Fischer (United States) Miss Fitch	(United States) S.A. Bogart (United States) Miss Sliver	6-2, 6-3
1894	(United States) Miss Mabel Ferris (United States) R.M. Ferris Jr	(United States) Miss Hale (United States) John Kingman	
1900	(United States) Mrs. W.H. Pouch (United States) Mr. W. H. Pouch	(United States) J. L. Robertson Jr. (United States) Miss Pauline Lowerre	6-4, 3-6, 6-3
1901	(United States) Hugh Tallant (United States) Miss Woodward	(United States) Miss Marie Matthiessen (United States) Louis V. Ledouz	6-2, 6-3
1903	(United States) Miss Strang (United States) H.D. Betts	(United States) Miss Homans (United States) Mr. Ledoux	6-1, 6-3, 7-5
1904	(United States) Miss Kate Atkins (United States) Hugh Tallant	(United States) F. H. Blake (United States) Miss Elizabeth Elting	6-0, 6-0
1905	No Tournament		
1906	No Tournament		
1907	(United States) Artemus Holmes (United States) Mrs. Chapman	(United States) J.M. Steinacher (United States) Marie Wagner	6-8, 8-6, 6-1
1908	No Record		
1909	(United States) Elisabeth Moore (United States) Julio M. Steinacher	(United States) Miss Morris (United States) Albert Ostendorf	
1910	(United States) Mrs. S.F Weaver (United States) N.H. Bundy	(United States) Dr. William Rosenbaum (United States) Marie Wagner	6-4, 8-6
1912	(United States) Mrs. W.H. Manvel (United States) Joseph C. Condon	(United States) Adelaide Browning (United States) Allen Behr	3-6, 6-3, 6-3
1913	(United States) Mr. Albert Ostendorf (United States) Marie Wagner	(United States) Mr. Phillips (United States) Mrs. Lehman	6-3, 9-7
1914	(United States) Ralph Baggs (United States) Clare Cassell	(United States) F.T. Hunter (United States) Teresa Wood	8–6, 6–2
1915	(United States) Natalie Browning (United States) A.W. Waite	(United States) Mrs. A. Humphries (United States) Ingo Hartmann	6-1, 7-5
1918	No Tournament		
