= W. Livingston Larned =

Americal writer and poet (1880–1960)

William Livingston Larned
- Born: 1880; Buffalo, Erie, New York
- Died: 21 November 1960 (aged 79–80); White Plains, Westchester, New York
- Occupations: Author, poet
- Writing career
- Notable works: Father Forgets; Illustration in Advertising; Florida's State Flower (poem)

William Livingston Larned was an American author and poet. He is known for his works "Father Forgets" and "Advertisement Illustration". In 1909, he penned a poem titled "Florida's State Flower" to commemorate the designation of the orange blossom as the official state flower of Florida.

== Works ==
- Father Forgets (essay) (1927)

The shorter version by Reader's Digest of this poem was also included in Dale Carnegie's book, "How to Win Friends and Influence People". Carnegie described it as; One of the popular writings in American journalism. Initially, it was published as an editorial in 1927 in the People's Home Journal. Since then, it has been printed in numerous magazines, newsletters, and newspapers across the country, and it has also been translated into various foreign languages. Additionally, it has been featured on many radio shows and programs. Surprisingly, even college and high school publications have shared this poem.

- Florida's State Flower (poem) (1909)

=== Books ===
- Larned, W. Livingston (1929). Illustration in Advertising. Alpha Editions. p. 332. ISBN 9789354043178.
- A Sales Manager's Field Letters to His Men (1926)
- The Trailer for Pleasure and Business (1937)
- What Should Type and Typography Cost? (1920)
