= Fisk Rubber Company =

American tire company

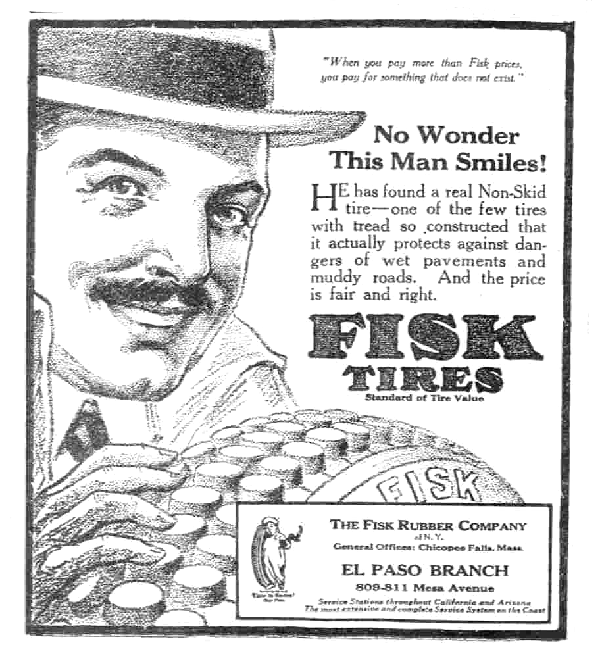
1917 newspaper ad for Fisk tires, showing an example of the product.

The Fisk Rubber Company was an American tire company from Chicopee Falls, Massachusetts. It was a major force in the US tire industry from the late 1900s to late 1920s.

== History ==
In 1898, the Spaulding and Pepper Co was sold to Noyes W. Fisk and renamed the Fisk Rubber Co. It employed more than 600 people in 1910 and more than 3,000 during World War I (with a weekly payroll averaging $48,000). By 1917, the company employed 4,500 people with a $70,000 payroll. The company was headquartered in Chicopee Falls, Massachusetts.

In the 1920s, Fisk also had plants in New Bedford, Massachusetts, Jewett City, Connecticut, Pawtucket, Rhode Island. In the 1920s, there were Fisk Retail Stores in 40 states; and the Chicopee plant turned out 5,000 tires a day.

The company experienced a gradual decline in market share, forced down into the category of a medium-sized firm. It was an industry leader but was in receivership from 1931 to 1933; the receivers overseeing the company cut the prices of tires in January 1933 as part of an overall market discounting trend. The company rejected a quota system in the market proposed by the Retail Rubber Tire (RRT) authority under the National Recovery Administration (NRA) and also was against a system of price differentials by the RRT, as they feared it would let the larger tire companies control the retail price of every tire manufactured in the US.

Fisk was forced out of the market by "competition and systematic price discrimination", and the company's demise was accelerated by the du Pont family's taking an interest in the United States Rubber Company (they already controlled General Motors), in the OEM tire market. The domination of the replacement tire market (among, for example, bus and taxi companies) by the four leading tire manufacturers was at the expense of Fisk and other medium-sized firms while reducing profit margins for all.

The company had 121 retail tire stores in 1930, but only three by 1934. The firm was unable to sustain its stores; during the Great Depression, the company discontinued two-thirds of its dealerships by excluding those with less than $200 in annual sales.

Fisk had two subsidiary companies that supplied lower-cost tires, the Badger Rubber Works and the Federal Rubber Company. The Fisk enterprise, as a whole, was acquired by United States Rubber (later Uniroyal) in 1940. After having been dormant for many years, the Fisk brand was revived by Discount Tire in 1996 under an agreement with Michelin, which had purchased Uniroyal in 1990.

== Advertising ==
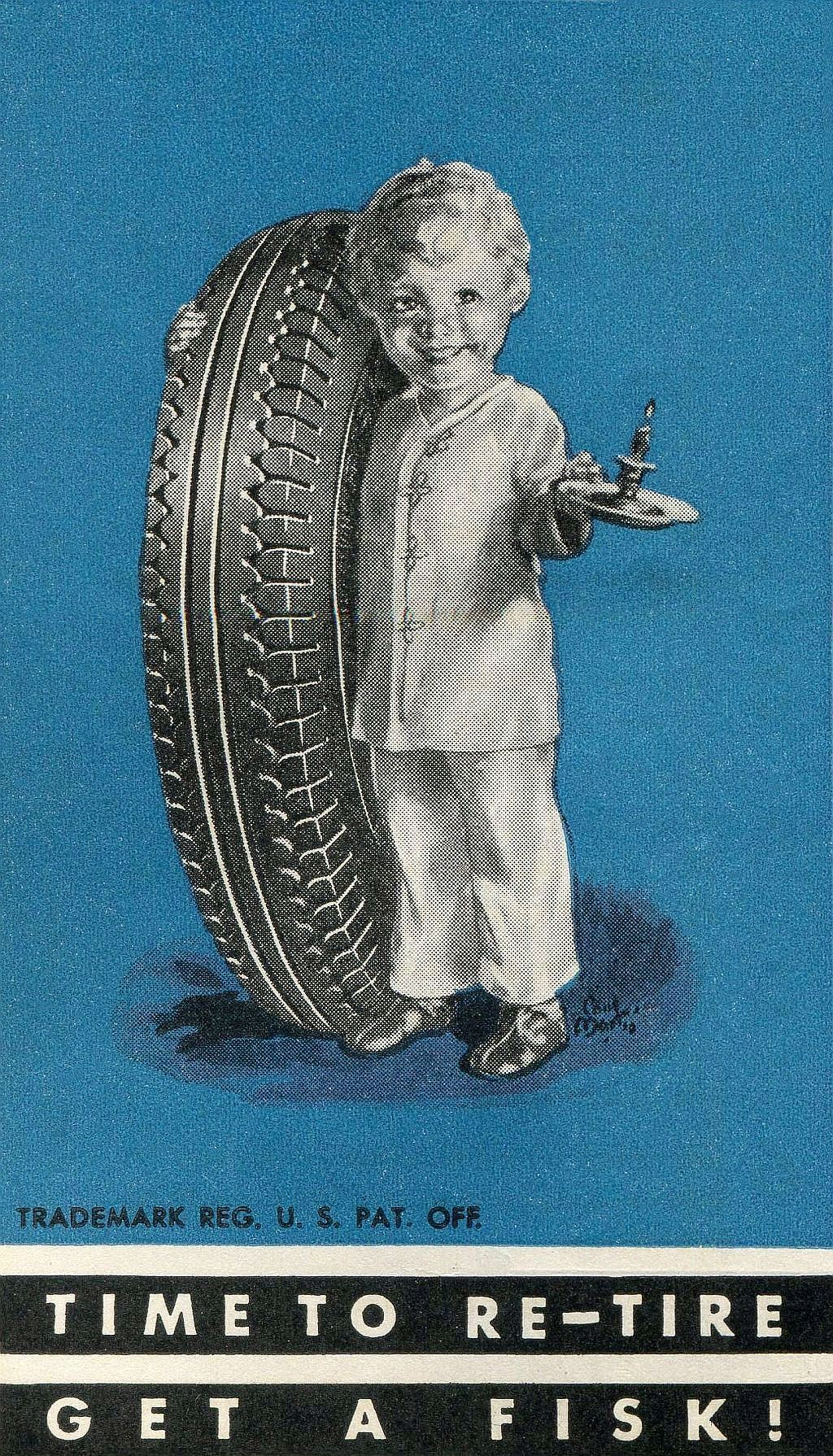
The young boy with a tire and a candle in 1930. Illustrated by Paul Martin.

The company was known for its "Time to Re-Tire" tagline, featuring a young, pajama-clad boy with his right arm encircling a tire and his left hand holding a candle. The boy was designed in 1910 by Burr Giffen (1886–1965), an agency art director who was still awake at an early hour. The next day, he presented his sketch to his manager, who liked it so much that it was made into a poster for the Fisk Company. The character was redesigned in 1930 by Paul Martin. The original painting was sent to the Metropolitan Museum of Art for restoration after the US Rubber Company acquired Fisk.
