= American Junior Red Cross =

- Formation: September 18, 1917
- Type: Charitable organization
- Headquarters: Washington, D.C.

The American Junior Red Cross was founded in 1917. President Woodrow Wilson announced the opening in a formal proclamation. Henry Noble MacCracken formulated the plan in consultation with other educators. The idea was to allow and encourage juniors to assist their country through the American Red Cross. Its initial purpose was to help civilians suffering during World War I. Afterward, the purpose shifted to being a good neighbor and helping those in need locally, nationally, and worldwide.

== Program ==
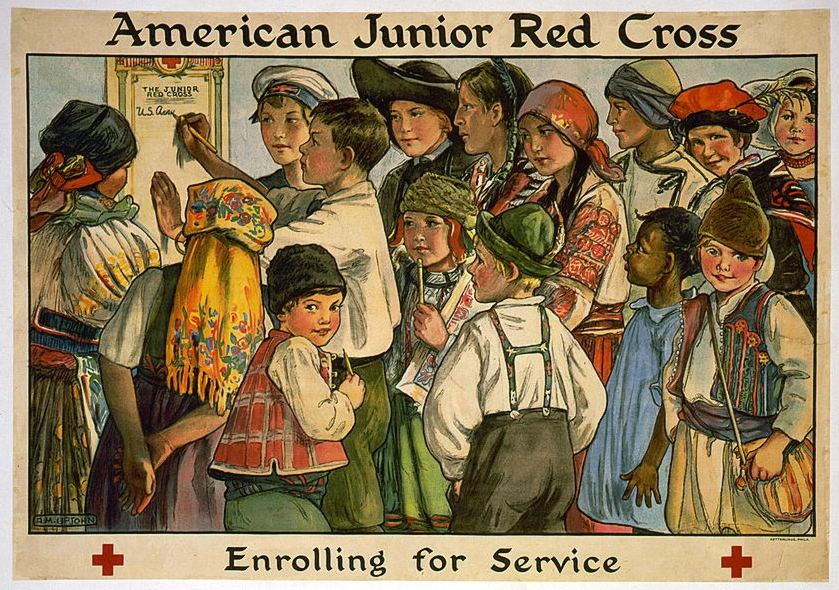
"Enrolling for Service" by Anna Milo Upjohn, 1919

The character-building organization was open to boys and girls from elementary to high school. They cheered up disadvantaged children by supplying them with books, candy, clothes, handmade crafts and scrapbooks, pencils, toothbrushes, toys, and other accessories. These were class projects under the guidance of a teacher. Some of these items were included in gift boxes. A notable local activity was visiting patients at children's, veterans', and convalescent hospitals. The students would raise funds on their own or in groups, such as by performing in plays. This helped send first-aid kits and gift boxes overseas. The implementation of the American Junior Red Cross in schools served to educate the students about health, such as hygiene, eating well, and avoiding unhealthy habits like drugs and alcohol.

Their publication was titled Junior Red Cross News from September 1919 to January 1924. The word American was added beginning with the February 1924 issue. AJRC membership was over twenty-two million in 1957. Many artists created posters that showed the youngsters in action, especially Anna Milo Upjohn. The posters were displayed on classroom walls. They often showed children working on humanitarian projects. Upjohn started drawing pictures and writing articles for their publication from the onset. They portrayed the similarities and differences of child life in faraway lands without dwelling on the distressing aspects.

Motto: "I serve," often worn as a lapel pin. This motto also appeared on most of their magazine covers from January 1920 to May 1940. Pledge. Also called Statement of Principles: "We believe in service for others, for our country, our community, and our school, in health of mind and body to fit us for greater service, and in working for better human relations throughout the world. We have joined the American Junior Red Cross to help achieve its aims by working together with members everywhere, in our own and other lands."

Post-WWI, the Junior Red Cross played a role during the Great Depression by supplying additional food and clothing.

At the beginning of World War II, many members of the Junior Red Cross joined the efforts of the Red Cross to assist where they could. Members would visit military camps and hospitals to entertain people while also collecting items that would be helpful to the military. The organization also assisted with the recruitment of blood donors for the sick and injured.

== Closing ==
The American Junior Red Cross served multiple purposes. Students learned about friendship, compassion, geography, responsibility, understanding, and the cultures of other nations. They also learned critical life skills, including health care and first aid. They developed writing skills by exchanging letters internationally. The organization eventually faded from prominence and transitioned into local clubs, which taught roughly the same positive values. Volunteerism was increasingly considered a non-school activity starting in the 1960s. Their publication was renamed Youth News with the October 1973 issue and ceased publication with the October 1975 issue.
