= People's Home Journal =

General interest magazine (1885–1929)

- Categories: Women's magazine
- Frequency: Monthly
- Publisher: F. M. Lupton (1885-1929)
- Founded: 1885
- Final issue: 1929
- Country: USA
- Based in: New York City
- Language: English

People's Home Journal was a general-interest magazine that ran from 1885 to 1929. It was directed toward women, housewives and families. A typical issue would feature recipes, household tips, humorous and informative tidbits, poems, and short stories of lighthearted adventure, mystery and suspense. The earliest issues also contained articles on agricultural subjects. PHJ also sold its own line of sewing patterns and embroidery transfers. These were featured in a catalog called The Home Dressmaker and Needlework Instructor (debut 1924).

This magazine championed "bird sanctuaries." The purpose was to protect them and their natural habitat from prey and other dangers. They also championed "little gardens." The central belief was that the cultivation of just small plots would help combat hunger, in the post-World War I era.

== History ==
It was published in New York by F. M. (Frank Moore) Lupton. The presidency was turned over to Moody B. (Bliss) Gates in 1912. Its monthly circulation hovered around one million for many years. That ranked among the highest in the industry. A big-name short story contributor to the magazine was author Ellis Parker Butler.
