= Marie Wagner =

American tennis player (1883–1975)

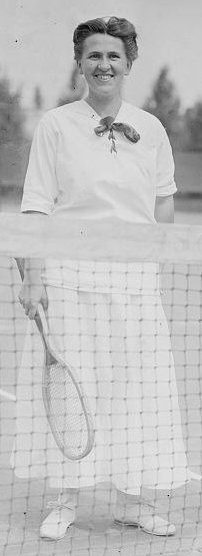
- Wagner in 1913
- Country (sports): USA
- Born: 2 February 1883 Freeport, New York, US
- Died: 1 April 1975 (aged 92) or 28 March 1975 (aged 92)
- Plays: Right-handed
- Int. Tennis HoF: 1969 (member page)

Singles

Grand Slam singles results
- US Open: F (1914)

Doubles

Grand Slam doubles results
- US Open: QF (1914)

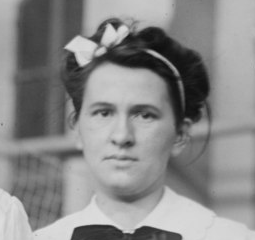
Marie Wagner

Marie Wagner (February 2, 1883 – April 1, 1975 or March 28, 1975) was an American tennis champion.

== Biography ==
Wagner was born on February 2, 1883, in Freeport, New York. An outstanding tennis player, she won the United States Indoor Championships a record number of times. In the singles event, she won the title six times (1908, 1909, 1911, 1913, 1914, and 1917) while in doubles, she was successful in 1910, 1913 (with Clara Kutross), 1916 (with Molla Mallory) and in 1917 (with Margaret Taylor).

At the U.S. National Championships, her best showing was reaching the final in 1914 which she lost in three sets to reigning champion Mary Browne.

Wagner was ranked in the Top 10 in the U.S. between 1913 (the first year women were ranked) and 1920. She achieved her highest national ranking of No.3 in 1914.

Wagner is mentioned in Chapter 3 of Harpo Speaks!, the 1961 autobiography of Harpo Marx. When Harpo was a child, the Marx family lived in a tenement building at 179 93rd Street, New York, New York, across the street from Wagner's brownstone.

She was inducted into the International Tennis Hall of Fame in 1969. Wagner died in 1975.

== United States Indoor Championships ==
=== Singles ===
Year	Champion	Runner-up	Score
1907	Elisabeth Moore	Marie Wagner	6–2, 4–6, 6–2
1908	Marie Wagner 1/6	Nora Meyer Schmitz	6–3, 6–2
1909	Marie Wagner 2/6	Elisabeth Moore	6–0, 12–14, 6–0
1911	Marie Wagner 3/6	Nora Meyer Schmitz	6–4, 7–9, 6–4
1913	Marie Wagner 4/6	Alice Day Beard	6–1, 6–1
1914	Marie Wagner 5/6	Alice Day Beard	6–1, 2–6, 6–2
1915	Molla Bjurstedt 1/5	Marie Wagner	6–4, 6–4
1917	Marie Wagner 1/6	Eleanor Goss	6–3, 6–1

Doubles

Year	Winners	Runner-Ups	Score
1909	Ema Marcus Elisabeth Moore	Marie Wagner Louise Hammond Raymond	3–6, 6–4, 12–10
1910	Marie Wagner 1/4 Clara Kutroff Cassebeer 1/2	Erna Marcus Elisabeth Moore	6–2, 5–7, 6–3
1913	Marie Wagner 2/4 Clara Kutroff Cassebeer 2/2	May Fish Alice Fish	10–8, 6–2
1916	Marie Wagner 3/4 Molla Bjurstedt	Nora Meyer Schmitz Emily Stokes Weaver	6–2, 6–3
1917	Marie Wagner 4/4 Margaret Taylor	Mrs. John Anderson Edith Howe	6–4, 6–4

== Grand Slam finals ==
=== Singles (1 runner-up) ===
Result	Year	Championship	Surface	Opponent	Score
Loss	1914	U.S. National Championships	Grass	(United States) Mary Browne	2–6, 6–1, 1–6
