= Bill Tilden career statistics =

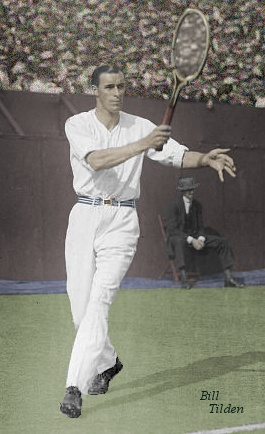
Bill Tilden playing a forehand shot

This is a list of the main career statistics of American former tennis player Bill Tilden (1893–1953) whose amateur and professional career spanned three decades from the early 1910s to the mid 1940s.

== Major titles ==
=== Performance timeline ===
Bill Tilden joined professional tennis in 1931 and was unable to compete in the amateur Grand Slam tournaments from that year onward.

																	Titles / played	Career win–loss	Career win %
Grand Slam	Amateur career																10 / 23	114–13	89.76
Grand Slam	1915	1916	1917	1918	1919	1920	1921	1922	1923	1924	1925	1926	1927	1928	1929	1930	10 / 23	114–13	89.76
Australian	A	not held			A	A	A	A	A	A	A	A	A	A	A	A	0 / 0	0–0	N/A
French	not held					Only for players of French clubs					A	A	F	A	SF	F	0 / 3	14–3	82.35
Wimbledon	not held				A	W	W	A	A	A	A	A	SF	SF	SF	W	3 / 6	31–3	91.18
U.S.	A	1R	3R	F	F	W	W	W	W	W	W	QF	F	A	W	SF	7 / 14	69–7	90.79
Pro Slam	Professional career																3 / 18	36–17	67.92
Pro Slam	1931	1932	1933	1934	1935	1936	1937	1938	1939	1940	1941	1942	1943	1944	1945	1946	3 / 18	36–17	67.92
U.S. Pro	W	SF	A	A	W	A	A	A	SF	SF	QF	A	QF	N.H.	SF	1R	2 / 9	18–7	72.00
French Pro	A	A	N.H.	W	SF	A	SF	F	SF	not held							1 / 5	10–4	71.43
Wembley Pro	not held			3rd	F	N.H.	F	N.H.	3rd	not held							0 / 4	8–6	57.14
Total:																	13 / 41	150–30	83.33

=== Grand Slam tournaments ===
Singles : 10 titles, 5 runner-ups
Result	Year	Championship	Surface	Opponent	Score
Loss	1918	U.S. Championships	Grass	(United States) R. Lindley Murray	3–6, 1–6, 5–7
Loss	1919	U.S. Championships	Grass	(United States) Bill Johnston	4–6, 4–6, 3–6
Win	1920	Wimbledon	Grass	(Australia) Gerald Patterson	2–6, 6–2, 6–3, 6–4
Win	1920	U.S. Championships	Grass	(United States) Bill Johnston	6–1, 1–6, 7–5, 5–7, 6–3
Win	1921	Wimbledon (2)	Grass	(South Africa) Brian Norton	4–6, 2–6, 6–1, 6–0, 7–5
Win	1921	U.S. Championships (2)	Grass	(United States) Wallace F. Johnson	16–18, 2–6, 6–1, 6–2, 6–4
Win	1922	U.S. Championships (3)	Grass	(United States) Bill Johnston	4–6, 3–6, 6–2, 6–3, 6–4
Win	1923	U.S. Championships (4)	Grass	(United States) Bill Johnston	6–4, 6–1, 6–4
Win	1924	U.S. Championships (5)	Grass	(United States) Bill Johnston	6–1, 9–7, 6–2
Win	1925	U.S. Championships (6)	Grass	(United States) Bill Johnston	4–6, 11–9, 6–3, 4–6, 6–3
Loss	1927	French Championships	Clay	(France) René Lacoste	4–6, 6–4, 7–5, 3–6, 9–11
Loss	1927	U.S. Championships	Grass	(France) René Lacoste	9–11, 3–6, 9–11
Win	1929	U.S. Championships (7)	Grass	(United States) Francis Hunter	3–6, 6–3, 4–6, 6–2, 6–4
Loss	1930	French Championships	Clay	(France) Henri Cochet	6–3, 6–8, 3–6, 1–6
Win	1930	Wimbledon (3)	Grass	(United States) Wilmer Allison	6–3, 9–7, 6–4

Doubles: 6 titles, 2 runner-ups
Result	Year	Championship	Surface	Partner	Opponents	Score
Win	1918	U.S. Championships	Grass	(United States) Vincent Richards	(United States) Fred Alexander (United States) Beals Wright	6–3, 6–4, 3–6, 2–6, 6–2
Loss	1919	U.S. Championships	Grass	(United States) Vincent Richards	(Australia) Norman Brookes (Australia) Gerald Patterson	6–8, 3–6, 6–4, 6–4, 2–6
Win	1921	U.S. Championships	Grass	(United States) Vincent Richards	(United States) Watson Washburn (United States) Richard Norris Williams	13–11, 12–10, 6–1
Win	1922	U.S. Championships	Grass	(United States) Vincent Richards	(Australia) Pat O'Hara Wood (Australia) Gerald Patterson	4–6, 6–1, 6–3, 6–4
Win	1923	U.S. Championships	Grass	(South Africa) Brian Norton	(United States) Richard Williams (United States) Watson Washburn	3–6, 6–2, 6–3, 5–7, 6–2
Loss	1926	U.S.Championships	Grass	(United States) Alfred Chapin	(United States) Vincent Richards (United States) R. Norris Williams	4–6, 8–6, 9–11, 3–6
Win	1927	Wimbledon	Grass	(United States) Francis Hunter	(France) Jacques Brugnon (France) Henri Cochet	1–6, 4–6, 8–6, 6–3, 6–4
Win	1927	U.S. Championships	Grass	(United States) Francis Hunter	(United States) Richard Norris Williams (United States) Bill Johnston	10–8, 6–3, 6–3

Mixed doubles: 5 titles, 6 runner-ups
Result	Year	Championship	Surface	Partner	Opponents	Score
Win	1913	U.S. Championships	Grass	(United States) Mary K. Browne	(United States) Dorothy Green (United Kingdom) C.S. Rogers	7–5, 7–5
Win	1914	U.S. Championships (2)	Grass	(United States) Mary K. Browne	(United States) Margaretta Myers (United States) J. R. Rowland	6–1, 6–4
Loss	1916	U.S. Championships	Grass	(United States) Florence Ballin	(United States) Eleonora Sears (United States) Willis E. Davis	4–6, 5–7
Loss	1917	U.S. Championships	Grass	(United States) Florence Ballin	(Norway) Molla Bjurstedt (United States) Irving Wright	12–10, 1–6, 3–6
Loss	1919	U.S. Championships	Grass	(United States) Florence Ballin	(United States) Marion Zinderstein (United States) Vincent Richards	6–2, 9–11, 2–6
Loss	1921	U.S. Championships	Grass	(United States) Molla Mallory	(United States) Bill Johnston (United States) Mary Browne	6–3, 4–6, 3–6
Win	1922	U.S. Championships (3)	Grass	(United States) Molla Mallory	(United States) Howard Kinsey (United States) Helen Wills	6–4, 6–3
Win	1923	U.S. Championships (4)	Grass	(United States) Molla Mallory	(Australia) John Hawkes (United Kingdom) Kitty McKane	6–3, 2–6, 10–8
Loss	1924	U.S. Championships	Grass	(United States) Molla Mallory	(United States) Vincent Richards (United States) Helen Wills	8–6, 5–7, 0–6
Loss	1927	French Championships	Clay	(Spain) Lilí Álvarez	(France) Marguerite Broquedis (France) Jean Borotra	4–6, 6–2, 2–6
Win	1930	French Championships	Clay	(Germany) Cilly Aussem	(United Kingdom) Eileen Bennett (France) Henri Cochet	6–4, 6–4

=== Pro Slam ===
Singles : 3 titles, 4 runners-up
Result	Year	Championship	Surface	Opponent	Score
Win	1931	U.S. Championship	Grass	(United States) Vinnie Richards	7–5, 6–2, 6–1
Win	1934	French Championship	Clay	(France) Martin Plaa	6–2, 6–4, 7–5
Loss	1935	Wembley Championship	Indoors	(United States) Ellsworth Vines	1–6, 3–6, 7–5, 6–3, 3–6
Win	1935	U.S. Championship	Clay	(Czechoslovakia) Karel Kozeluh	0–6, 6–1, 6–4, 0–6, 6–4
Loss	1937	Wembley Championship	Indoors	(Germany) Hans Nüsslein	3–6, 6–3, 3–6, 6–2, 2–6
Loss	1938	French Championship	Clay	(Germany) Hans Nüsslein	0–6, 1–6, 2–6

=== World Championship finals ===
Singles : 1 title
Result	Year	Championship	Surface	Opponent	Score
Win	1921	World Hard Court Championships	Clay	(Belgium) Jean Washer	6–3, 6–3, 6–3

== Career titles ==
Amateur													Professional							
1918	1919	1920	1921	1922	1923	1924	1925	1926	1927	1928	1929	1930	1931	1932	1933	1934	1935	1936	1937	1938
5	9	6	4	8	8	11	15	11	13	2	5	18	3	0	2	4	3	0	2	1

=== Amateur era ===
According to Bud Collins, as an amateur (1912–1930) Tilden won 138 of 192 tournaments, lost 28 finals and had a 907–62 match record, a 93.60% winning percentage. Only known titles are detailed here.

Titles by surface
Clay (70)
Grass (43)
Wood (9)
Hard (4)
? (12)

No.	Date	Tournament	Country	Surface	Opponent	Score
1	1915–5–?	Philadelphia District, Germantown, PA	United States	Grass	(United States) Stanley W. Pearson	4–6, 6–0, 5–7, 9–7, 6–0
2	1915–6–12	Pennsylvania Invitational, St Martins, PA	United States	Grass	(United States) Craig Biddle	0–6, 6–3, 6–4, 7–5
3	1915–7–17	Schuylkill Valley, PA	United States	Clay	(United States) Norman Swayne	6–1, 6–4, 3–6, 6–1
4	1915–9–11	Western New Jersey Championship, Moorestown, NJ	United States	Grass	(United States) E.C. Hall	11–9, 6–4, 0–6, 4–6, 6–4
5	1916	Schuylkill Valley, PA	United States	Clay	(United States) Philip B. Hawk	
6	1916–7–22	Beach Haven, NJ	United States		(United States) Norman Swayne	6–2, 6–3, 3–6, 3–6, 6–4
7	1916	Point Pleasant, PA (Memorial Day)	United States		(United States) Paul W. Gibbons	
8	1916	Point Pleasant, PA (Labor Day)	United States		(United States) Hammett Norton	
9	1916	Western New Jersey Championship, NJ	United States	Grass	(United States) Norman Swayne	
10	1916	Camden County, NJ	United States		(United States) Philip B. Hawk	6–4, 1–6, 6–2, 6–8, 6–1
11	June 1917	Delaware State Patriotic Tournament	United States		(United States) P.S. Osborne	6–1, 6–2, 6–0
12	1917–7–21	Beach Haven, NJ	United States		(United States) Norman Swayne	6–3, 1–6, 7–5, 4–6, 6–0
13	1918–05–18	New York Harlem Tennis Club	United States	Clay	(United States) Henry Bassford	6–2, 7–5, 6–0
14	1918–06–9	Bronxville Championships, New York	United States	?	(United States) S.Howard Voshell	6–4, 4–6, 6–2, 3–6, 6–2
15	1918–06–15	Pennsylvania Grass Court Championships, Philadelphia	United States	Grass	(United States) Philip B. Hawk	6–2, 6–0, 6–0
16	1918–06–22	Western Pennsylvania Championships, Pittsburgh	United States	Grass	(United States) Charles Garland	2–6, 6–3, 7–5, 6–3
17	1918–07–06	U.S. Clay Court Championships, Chicago	United States	Clay	(United States) Charles Garland	6–4, 6–4, 3–6, 6–2
18	1918–08–24	Meadow Club Invitational, Southampton	United States	Grass	(United States) Theodore Pell	6–4, 6–2, 6–4
19	1919–03-01	Middle States Indoor, Philadelphia	United States	Wood	(United States) Vincent Richards	4–6, 6–3, 5–7, 6–2, 7–5
20	1919–04-19	North & South Tournament, Pinehurst	United States	?	(Japan) Ichiya Kumagae	1–6, 6–2, 6–3, 6–4
21	1919–05-19	Harlem Tennis Club, New York	United States	Clay	(Japan) Ichiya Kumagae	6–4, 6–4, 6–4
22	1919–06–01	Plymouth Cup, Plymouth	United States	Grass	(United States) Wallace Johnson	6–1, 4–6, 6–4, 6–4
23	1919–06–18	Pennsylvania Grass Court Championships, Philadelphia	United States	Grass	(United States) Wallace Johnson	6–4, 4–6, 6–3, 6–8, 6–2
24	1919–06–28	Delaware Championships, Wilmington	United States	Grass	(United States) Richard Norris Williams	6–1, 6–3, 6–1
25	1919–07–10	Western Pennsylvania, Philadelphia	United States	Clay	(United States) Vincent Richards	6-4, 6-3, 3-6, 6-1
26	1919–08–01	Seabright Invitational, New Jersey	United States	Grass	(United States) Leonard Beekman	6–3, 3–6, 6–2, 6–1
27	1919–08–09	Newport Casino Trophy, Newport	United States	Grass	(United States) William Johnston	7–5, 8–6, 6–1
28	1920-03-28	U.S. Indoor Championships, New York	United States	Wood ?	(United States) Vincent Richards	10–8, 6–3, 6–1
29	1920-04-14	North & South Tournament, Pinehurst	United States	Clay	(United States) S.Howard Voshell	6–4, 11–13, 6–3, 6–4
30	1920-06–23	Wimbledon	United Kingdom	Grass	(Australia) Gerald Patterson	2–6, 6–2, 6–3, 6–4
31	1920-07–26	Midland Counties Championships, Edgbaston	England	?	(South Africa) Charles Winslow	6–4, 6–2, 2–6, 6–4
32	1920-09–18	U.S. Championships	United States	Grass	(United States) William Johnston	6–1, 1–6, 7–5, 5–7, 6–3
33	1920–12	New Zealand Championships, Auckland	New Zealand	Grass	(Australia) Gerald Patterson	6–3, 6–3, 6–1
34	1921-04-07	Pennsylvania Invitational, Philadelphia	United States	Wood	(United States) Vincent Richards	6–4, 6–3, 6–3
35	1921-05-05	World Hard Court Championships, Paris	France	Clay	(Belgium) Jean Washer	6–3, 6–3, 6–3
36	1921-07–02	Wimbledon	England	Grass	(South Africa) Brian Norton	4–6, 2–6, 6–1, 6–0, 7–5
37	1921-09–19	U.S. Championships	United States	Grass	(United States) Wallace Johnson	6–1, 6–3, 6–1
38	1922-5-30	Philadelphia & District Championships, Philadelphia	United States	Clay	(United States) Wallace Johnson	2–6, 2–6, 6–4, 6–2, 6–3
39	1922-06–05	Eastern Pennsylvania, Philadelphia	United States	Clay	(United States) Phil Bettens	6–4, 5–7, 6–0, 6–0
40	1922-06–19	Rhode Island Clay Court, Providence	United States	Clay	(United States) Arnold Jones	7–5, 6–4, 6–0
41	1922-06–26	Illinois State Championships, Skokie	United States	Grass	(United States) Walter T. Hayes	6–3, 6–3, 6–3
42	1922-07–10	U.S. Clay Court Championships, Indianapolis	United States	Clay	(Japan) Zenzo Shimizu	7–5, 6–3, 6–1
43	1922-07–15	Providence Rhode Island State	United States	Clay	(United States) Vincent Richards	6–3, 6–1, 6–0
44	1922-07–23	Longwood Bowl, Brookline	United States	Grass	(United States) Richard Norris Williams	6–1, 6–3, 7–5
45	1922-09–16	U.S. Championships	United States	Grass	(United States) William Johnston	4–6, 3–6, 6–2, 6–3, 6–4
46	1923-02-12	Buffalo Indoor Championships, Buffalo	United States	Wood ?	(United States) Vincent Richards	6–4, 4–6, 3–6, 6–3, 6–1
47	1923-05-31	Philadelphia City Championships	United States	Clay	(United States) Wallace Johnson	3–6, 6–3, 11–9, 7–5
48	1923-06–02	Eastern Pennsylvania, Philadelphia	United States	Clay	(Spain) Manuel Alonso	1–6, 4–6, 6–4, 6–2, 6–3
49	1923-06–17	New England Championships, Hartford	United States	Grass ?	(Spain) Manuel Alonso	7–5, 7–5, 6–8, 6–3
50	1923-06–24	Great Lakes Championships, Buffalo	United States	Clay	(Spain) Manuel Alonso	7–5, 6–3, 6–3
51	1923-07-16	U.S. Clay Court Championships, Chicago	United States	Clay	(Spain) Manuel Alonso	6–2, 6–8, 6–1, 7–5
52	1923-07–29	Southern California Championships, Los Angeles	United States	Hard ?	(Spain) Manuel Alonso	9–7, 6–4, 6–2
53	1923-07–16	U.S. Championships	United States	Grass	(United States) William Johnston	6–4, 6–1, 6–4
54	1924-04-06	South Atlantic Championships, Augusta	United States	Clay	(United States) Lawrence Rice	6–1, 6–3, 6–4
55	1924-05-03	Middle States Clay Court Championships, Philadelphia	United States	Clay	(Spain) Manuel Alonso	3–6, 6–2, 5–7, 6–4, 6–4
56	1924-06–02	Orange Invitation, Mountain Station	United States	Grass	(United States) Dean Mathey	4–6, 7–5, 3–6, 6–0, 6–2
57	1924-06–06	Rhode Island State Championships, Providence	United States	Clay	(United States) Nathaniel Niles	6–0, 6–4, 6–1
58	1924-06–14	New England Championships, Hartford	United States	Clay	(United States) Nathaniel Niles	6–3, 6–1, 6–2
59	1924-06–20	Great Lakes Championships, Buffalo	United States	Clay	(United States) Alfred Chapin	3–6, 7–5, 6–1, 4–6, 8–6
60	1924-07–06	Western Championships, Indianapolis	United States	Clay	(United States) John Hennessey	6–2, 6–1, 6–2
61	1924-07–14	U.S. Clay Court Championships, Saint-Louis	United States	Clay	(United States) Harvey Snodgrass	6–2, 6–1, 6–1
62	1924-07–21	Illinois State Championships, Glencoe	United States	Grass	(United States) Robert Kinsey	6–1, 0–6, 6–4, 6–3
63	1924-08–08	Southern California, Los Angeles	United States	Hard	(United States) Alfred Chapin	?
64	1924-09–03	U.S. Championships	United States	Grass	(United States) William Johnston	6–1, 9–7, 6–2
65	1925-02-14	Heights Casino Indoor Invitation, Brooklyn	United States	Wood ?	(United States) Dean Mathey	6–2, 6–1, 6–8, 7–5
66	1925-02-23	Buffalo Indoor Championships, Buffalo	United States	Wood ?	(United States) Lawrence Rice	6–0, 6–4, 6–2
67	1925-03-16	Florida Championships, Palm Beach	United States	Clay	(Spain) Manuel Alonso	6–3, 7–9, 6–1, 6–4
68	1925-03-21	Southeastern Championships, Jacksonville	United States	Clay	(United States) Vincent Richards	7–5, 6–1, 6–4
69	1925-04-25	White Sulphur Springs Invitational	United States	Hard	(United States) Francis Hunter	6–1, 6–2, 6–3
70	1925-05-22	Pennsylvania & Middle States, Philadelphia	United States	Grass	(United States) Richard Norris Williams	0–6, 6–2, 6–4, 1–6, 6–4
71	1925-06–13	New England Championships, Hartford	United States	Clay	(Spain) Manuel Alonso	6–4, 6–4, 6–1
72	1925-06–21	Metropolitan Clay Court, New York City	United States	Clay	(United States) Vincent Richards	6–3, 6–3, 6–4
73	1925-06–27	Eastern New York State, New Rochelle	United States	Clay	(United States) Vincent Richards	8–6, 6–4, 6–1
74	1925-07–04	Nassau Bowl Invitation, Glen Cove	United States	Grass	(United States) Alfred Chapin	6–4, 6–0, 6–0
75	1925-07–09	Maryland Championships, Chevy Chase	United States	?	(United States) Alfred Chapin	5–7, 6–1, 7–5, 6–0
76	1925-07–11	Rhode Island State Championships, Providence	United States	Clay	(United States) Arnold Jones	6–2, 6–3, 6–3
77	1925-07–19	U.S. Clay Court Championships, Saint-Louis	United States	Clay	(United States) George Lott	3–6, 6–3, 2–6, 6–2, 8–6
78	1925-07–26	Illinois State Championships, Skokie	United States	Grass	(United States) William Johnston	6–4, 6–3, 9–7
79	1925-09–20	U.S. Championships	United States	Grass	(United States) William Johnston	4–6, 11–9, 6–3, 4–6, 6–3
80	1926–02-06	Heights Casino Indoor Invitation, Brooklyn	United States	Wood	(United States) Vincent Richards	6–3, 6–4, 11–9
81	1926–04-03	South Atlantic Championships, Augusta	United States	Clay	(United States) Alfred Chapin	6–3, 6–8, 6–4, 2–6, 6–3
82	1926–04-10	Blue Ridge Championships, Asheville	United States	Clay	(United States) Alfred Chapin	6–4, 4–6, 12–10, 4–6, 9–7
83	1926–06–13	New England Championships, Hartford	United States	Clay	(United States) Alfred Chapin	6–3, 10–8, 9–7
84	1926–06–20	Middle States Championships, Philadelphia	United States	Grass ?	(Spain) Manuel Alonso	6–3, 6–4, 3–6, 6–4
85	1926–07–12	U.S. Clay Court Championships, Detroit	United States	Clay	(South Africa) Brian Norton	walkover
86	1926–07–24	Longwood Bowl, Brookline	United States	Grass	(United States) Lewis White	6–3, 6–4, 6–3
87	1926–08–15	Southern New York, Rye	United States	Clay	(United States) Vincent Richards	4–6, 6–4, 7–5, 6–2
88	1926–08–21	Southampton Invitation, Southampton	United States	Grass	(South Africa) Brian Norton	6–4, 4–6, 6–4, 7–5
89	1926–08–28	Newport Casino Trophy	United States	Grass	(United States) Alfred Chapin	3–6, 6–4, 6–0, 8–6
90	1926–12–19	Pennsylvania AC Tournament, Philadelphia	United States	Wood	(Spain) Manuel Alonso	6–1, 6–3, 6–4
91	1927–03-06	South Florida, Miami Beach	United States	Clay	(Spain) Manuel Alonso	6–3, 7–9, 5–7, 6–4, 6–2
92	1927–03-12	Florida State Championships, Palm Beach	United States	?	(Spain) Manuel Alonso	7–5, 6–8, 3–6, 6–0, 6–4
93	1927–03-18	Southeastern Championships, Ortega	United States	Clay	(United States) George Lott	6–4, 6–1, 6–3
94	1927–04-01	South Atlantic Championships, Augusta	United States	Clay	(United States) George Lott	11–9, 0–6, 6–2, 6–1
95	1927–04-07	Blue Ridge Championships, Asheville	United States	Clay	(United States) George Lott	4–6, 6–4, 4–6, 6–1, 6–2
96	1927–04-15	North & South Tournament, Pinehurst	United States	Clay	(United States) George Lott	6–2, 7–5, 6–2
97	1927–07–24	U.S. Clay Court Championships, Detroit	United States	Clay	(United States) John Hennessey	6–4, 6–1, 6–2
98	1927–08–01	Illinois State Championships, Chicago	United States	Grass	(United States) John Hennessey	5–7, 6–3, 6–2, 3–6, 8–6
99	1927–08–06	Seabright Invitational	Rumson, United States	Grass	(United States) Francis Hunter	6–4, 6–1, 8–6
100	1927–08–13	New York Meadow Club, Southampton	United States	Grass	(United States) George Lott	6–2, 7–5, 6–2
101	1927–08–27	Newport Casino Trophy	United States	Grass	(Spain) Manuel Alonso	5–7, 6–3, 9–7, 6–2
102	1927–10–09	Pacific Southwest Championships, Los Angeles	United States	Hard ?	(United States) Francis Hunter	6–2, 6–4, 6–2
103	1927–10–28	Pennsylvania AC Tournament, Philadelphia	United States	Wood	(United States) Francis Hunter	8–6, 5–7, 2–1, ret.
104	1928–04-29	Ojai Valley California Championships	United States	?	(United States) John Hennessey	6–2, 6–1, 6–0
105	1928–06–23	London Championships	West Kensington, England	Grass	(United States) Francis Hunter	6–3, 6–2, 6–1
106	1929–06–09	Swiss Championships, Zurich	Switzerland	Clay	(United States) Francis Hunter	5–7, 6–4, 7–5, 3–6, 6–1
107	1929–06–16	Dutch Championships, Noordwijk	Netherlands	Clay	(United States) Francis Hunter	7–5, 6–3, 6–4
108	1929–08–17	Eastern Grass Court Championships, Rye	United States	Grass	(United States) Francis Hunter	6–2, 6–2, 10–8
109	1929–08–23	Newport Casino Trophy	United States	Grass	(United States) George Lott	6–2, 3–6, 6–4, 5–7, 6–3
110	1929–09–15	U.S. Championships	United States	Grass	(United States) Francis Hunter	3–6, 6–3, 4–6, 6–2, 6–4
111	1930-01-13	Monte-Carlo Country Club Tournament	Monaco	Clay	(Republic of Ireland) George Lyttleton-Rogers	7–5, 6–1, 6–8, 6–0
112	1930-01-25	New Courts de Cannes Championships	Cannes, France	Clay	(Italy) Giorgio De Stefani	6–1, 6–4, 6–1
113	1930-02-02	Galia Club de Cannes Championships, Cannes	France	Clay	(Austria) Hermann Von Artens	6–0, 6–2, 6–0
114	1930-02-18	South of France Championships, Nice	France	?Clay	(Republic of Ireland) George Lyttleton-Rogers	4–6, 8–6, 6–1, 5–7, 6–0
115	1930-03-02	Butler Trophy Cup, Monte-Carlo	Monaco	Clay	(United Kingdom) Bunny Austin	6–4, 6–1, 6–1
116	1930-03-09	French Riviera Championships, Menton	France	?Clay	(France) Jacques Brugnon	10–8, 7–5, 3–6, 4–6, 6–1
117	1930-03-16	Nice First Meeting	France	Clay	(Italy) Giorgio De Stefani	6–0, 6–4, 6–2
118	1930-03-24	Côte d'Azur Championships, Cannes	France	Clay	(Italy) Giorgio De Stefani	6–4, 6–3, 6–4
119	1930-04-06	Saint-Raphaël Championships	France	Clay	(United States) Wilbur Coen	Not played
120	1930-04-13	Juan-les-Pins Championships	Juan-les-Pins, France	Clay ?	(United States) Wilbur Coen	4–6, 6–1, 6–2, 6–3
121	1930-04-21	Beaulieu Second Meeting	France	Clay ?	(United States) Wilbur Coen	Walkover
122	1930-04-27	Monte-Carlo Third Meeting	Monaco	Clay	(France) Daniel Lesueur	6–1, 6–2, 6–3
123	1930-05-04	Italian Championships, Milan	Italy	Clay	(Italy) Umberto de Morpurgo	6–1, 6–1, 6–2
124	1930-05-11	Austrian International Championships, Vienna	Austria	Clay	(Austria) Franz Matejka	6–3, 6–1, 8–6
125	1930-06–09	German Championships, Berlin	Germany	Clay	(Germany) Daniel Prenn	7–5, 8–6, 1–6, 7–5
126	1930-07–04	Wimbledon	England	Grass	(United States) Wilmer Allison	6–3, 9–7, 6–4
127	1930-07–13	Dutch Championships, Noordwijk	Netherlands	Clay	(Germany) Roderich Menzel	8–6, 6–8, 6–3, 6–4
128	1930-08–23	Newport Casino Trophy, Newport	United States	Grass	(United States) Wilmer Allison	6–1, 0–6, 5–7, 6–2, 6–4

=== Professional era ===
Titles by surface
Clay (5)
Grass (4)
Wood (4)
? (3)

Singles (1931–1940) : 16+ titles
No.	Date	Tournament	Location	Surface	Runner-up	Score
1	1931-05-17	U.S. Pro Indoor	Philadelphia	Wood ?	(United States) Vincent Richards	6–4, 5–7, 7–5, 6–2
2	1931-05-31	Longwood Bowl Pro Championships	Boston	Wood	(Czechoslovakia) Karel Kozeluh	8–6, 6–3, 6–2
3	1931-07-12	U.S. Pro Championships	Forest Hills	Grass	(United States) Vincent Richards	7–5, 6–2, 6–1
4	1932-04	Washington Pro Championships	Washington DC	Wood (i)	(Republic of Ireland) Albert Burke	N/A Round Robin
5	1933-09-24	Paris First Meeting	Paris	Clay	(France) Henri Cochet	6–2, 6–4, 6–2
6	1933-12-31	U.S. Pro Indoor	Philadelphia	Wood (i)	(United States) Vincent Richards	6–4, 6–1, 6–2
7	1934-06-24	Great Lakes Pro	Detroit	?	(Czechoslovakia) Karel Koželuh	?
8	1934-09-16	Lyon Pro Championships	Lyon	Clay	(France) Henri Cochet	?
9	1934-09-23	French Pro Championship	Paris	Clay	(France) Martin Plaa	6–2, 6–4, 7–5
10	1934-09-30	Pro Championship of Britain	Southport	Grass	(France) Martin Plaa	N.A. (Round robin)
11	1935-06-02	American Pro	South Orange	Grass	(United States) George Lott	8–6, 6–1, 6–2
12	1935–08	Pro Championships	Le Touquet	Clay	(France) Robert Ramillon	6–3, 6–3, 6–4
13	1935-09-16	U.S. Pro Championships	Brooklyn	Grass	(Czechoslovakia) Karel Koželuh	0–6, 6–1, 6–4, 0–6, 6–4
14	1937-07-30	Pro Championships	La Baule	Clay	(France) Robert Ramillon	6–1, 6–2, 6–3
15	1937-09-19	German Pro Championships	Berlin	Clay	(Nazi Germany) Hans Nüsslein	round-robin
16	1938-07-10	Scottish Pro Championships	Glasgow	Grass	(Nazi Germany) Hans Nüsslein	6–3, 6–2

== Davis Cup ==
Tilden won 34 out of 41 Davis Cup matches; 25 of his 30 singles matches and 9 out of 11 doubles. He was a member of the victorious United States Davis Cup teams in 1920, 1921, 1922, 1923, 1924, 1925 and 1926.

Davis Cup: 7 titles
Edition	Zone	Round	Date	Opponents	Tie score	Location	Surface	Match	Opponent	W–L	Rubber score
1920	WG	QF	8–10 Jul 1920	France	3–0	Eastbourne	Grass	Singles 2	William Laurentz	W	4–6, 6–2, 6–1, 6–3
1920	WG	QF	8–10 Jul 1920	France	3–0	Eastbourne	Grass	Doubles (Johnston)	André Gobert; William Laurentz	W	6–2, 6–3, 6–2
1920	WG	SF	16–19 Jul 1920	Great Britain	5–0	London	Grass	Singles 2	Algernon Kingscote	W	4–6, 6–1, 6–3, 6–1
1920	WG	SF	16–19 Jul 1920	Great Britain	5–0	London	Grass	Doubles (Johnston)	Algernon Kingscote; James Cecil Parke	W	8–6, 4–6, 4–6, 6–3, 6–2
1920	WG	SF	16–19 Jul 1920	Great Britain	5–0	London	Grass	Singles 5	James Cecil Parke	W	6–2, 6–3, 7–5
1920	WG	F	30 Dec 1920 – 1 Jan 1921	Australia	5–0	Auckland	Grass	Singles 1	Norman Brookes	W	10–8, 6–4, 1–6, 6–4
1920	WG	F	30 Dec 1920 – 1 Jan 1921	Australia	5–0	Auckland	Grass	Doubles (Johnston)	Norman Brookes; Gerald Patterson	W	8–6, 4–6, 4–6, 6–3, 6–2
1920	WG	F	30 Dec 1920 – 1 Jan 1921	Australia	5–0	Auckland	Grass	Singles 4	Gerald Patterson	W	5–7, 6–2, 6–3, 6–3
1921	CR	F	2–5 Sep 1921	Japan	5–0	New York City	Grass	Singles 2	Zenzo Shimizu	W	5–7, 4–6, 7–5, 6–2, 6–1
1921	CR	F	2–5 Sep 1921	Japan	5–0	New York City	Grass	Singles 4	Ichiya Kumagae	W	9–7, 6–4, 6–1
1922	CR	F	1–5 Sep 1922	Australia	4–1	New York City	Grass	Singles 1	Gerald Patterson	W	7–5, 10–8, 6–0
1922	CR	F	1–5 Sep 1922	Australia	4–1	New York City	Grass	Doubles (Richards)	Pat O'Hara-Wood; Gerald Patterson	L	4–6, 0–6, 3–6
1922	CR	F	1–5 Sep 1922	Australia	4–1	New York City	Grass	Singles 4	James Anderson	W	6–4, 5–7, 3–6, 6–4, 6–2
1923	CR	F	31 Aug – 1 Sep 1923	Australia	4–1	New York City	Grass	Singles 2	John Hawkes	W	6–4, 6–2, 6–1
1923	CR	F	31 Aug – 1 Sep 1923	Australia	4–1	New York City	Grass	Doubles (Williams)	James Anderson; John Hawkes	W	17–15, 11–13, 2–6, 6–3, 6–2
1923	CR	F	31 Aug – 1 Sep 1923	Australia	4–1	New York City	Grass	Singles 5	James Anderson	W	6–2, 6–3, 1–6, 7–5
1924	CR	F	11–13 Sep 1924	Australia	5–0	Philadelphia	Grass	Singles 1	Gerald Patterson	W	6–4, 6–2, 6–2
1924	CR	F	11–13 Sep 1924	Australia	5–0	Philadelphia	Grass	Doubles (Johnston)	Pat O'Hara-Wood; Gerald Patterson	W	17–15, 11–13, 2–6, 6–3, 6–2
1924	CR	F	11–13 Sep 1924	Australia	5–0	Philadelphia	Grass	Singles 4	Pat O'Hara-Wood	W	6–2, 6–1, 6–1
1925	CR	F	11–13 Sep 1925	France	5–0	Philadelphia	Grass	Singles 1	Jean Borotra	W	4–6, 6–0, 2–6, 9–7, 6–4
1925	CR	F	11–13 Sep 1925	France	5–0	Philadelphia	Grass	Singles 4	René Lacoste	W	3–6, 10–12, 8–6, 7–5, 6–2
1926	CR	F	9–11 Sep 1926	France	4–1	Philadelphia	Grass	Singles 2	Jean Borotra	W	6–2, 6–3, 6–3
1926	CR	F	9–11 Sep 1926	France	4–1	Philadelphia	Grass	Singles 5	René Lacoste	L	6–4, 4–6, 6–8, 6–8
1927	CR	F	8–10 Sep 1927	France	2–3	Philadelphia	Grass	Singles 2	Henri Cochet	W	6–4, 2–6, 6–2, 8–6
1927	CR	F	8–10 Sep 1927	France	2–3	Philadelphia	Grass	Doubles (Hunter)	Jean Borotra; Jacques Brugnon	W	3–6, 6–3, 6–3, 4–6, 6–0
1927	CR	F	8–10 Sep 1927	France	2–3	Philadelphia	Grass	Singles 4	René Lacoste	L	3–6, 6–4, 3–6, 2–6
1928	A	QF	9–11 Apr 1928	Mexico	5–0	Mexico City	Clay	Singles 2	Robert Kinsey	W	6–1, 6–2, 6–4
1928	A	QF	9–11 Apr 1928	Mexico	5–0	Mexico City	Clay	Doubles (Jones)	Robert Kinsey; Alfonso Unda	W	6–2, 4–6, 6–3, 6–3
1928	A	SF	25–27 May 1928	(Taiwan) China	5–0	Kansas City	Clay	Doubles (Coen)	Paul Kong; Pao-Hua Lum	W	6–2, 6–1, 6–3
1928	A	F	1–3 Jun 1928	Japan	5–0	Chicago	Clay	Singles 1	Tamio Abe	W	6–2, 6–3, 6–0
1928	A	F	1–3 Jun 1928	Japan	5–0	Chicago	Clay	Doubles (Lott)	Tamio Abe; Teizo Toba	W	6–1, 10–8, 6–2
1928	A	F	1–3 Jun 1928	Japan	5–0	Chicago	Clay	Singles 5	Yoshiro Ota	W	6–8, 6–3, 6–1, 6–0
1928	CR	F	27–29 Jul 1928	France	1–4	Paris	Clay	Singles 1	René Lacoste	W	1–6, 6–4, 6–4, 2–6, 6–3
1928	CR	F	27–29 Jul 1928	France	1–4	Paris	Clay	Doubles (Hunter)	Jean Borotra; Henri Cochet	L	4–6, 8–6, 5–7, 6–4, 2–6
1928	CR	F	27–29 Jul 1928	France	1–4	Paris	Clay	Singles 4	Henri Cochet	L	7–9, 6–8, 4–6
1929	IZ	F	19–21 Jul 1929	Germany	5–0	Berlin	Clay	Singles 1	Hans Moldenhauer	W	6–2, 6–4, 6–4
1929	IZ	F	19–21 Jul 1929	Germany	5–0	Berlin	Clay	Singles 4	Daniel Prenn	W	6–1, 6–4, 6–1
1929	CR	F	26–28 Jul 1929	France	2–3	Paris	Clay	Singles 1	Henri Cochet	L	3–6, 2–6, 2–6
1929	CR	F	26–28 Jul 1929	France	2–3	Paris	Clay	Singles 4	Jean Borotra	W	4–6, 6–1, 6–4, 7–5
1930	CR	F	25–27 Jul 1930	France	1–4	Paris	Clay	Singles 1	Jean Borotra	W	2–6, 7–5, 6–4, 7–5
1930	CR	F	25–27 Jul 1930	France	1–4	Paris	Clay	Singles 5	Henri Cochet	L	6–4, 3–6, 1–6, 5–7

== Professional tours ==
Singles (1931–1941) : 14 tours
No.	Date	Tour	Standings
1	1931; February 18 – August 16	World Pro Tour (1)	1) (United States) Bill Tilden 50–17; 2) (Czechoslovakia) Karel Koželuh 17–50
2	1932; January 4 – July	World Pro Tour (2) Incomplete tour results. As of early April 1932, Tilden led Nüsslein 32 matches to 12.	1) (United States) Bill Tilden; 2) (Germany) Hans Nüsslein
3	1933; January 24 – May	World Pro Tour (3) Incomplete tour results. As of early May 1933, data from more than half their matches indicated that Tilden won two-thirds of the matches.	1) (United States) Bill Tilden; 2) (Germany) Hans Nüsslein
4	1934; January 10 – May 13	World Pro Tour (4) The results are not known definitively. However, American Lawn Tennis reported that Vines had an edge of 11–9 in the first phase of their tour from January 10 through February 16 and that Vines led Tilden by a 19-match margin after the second phase of their tour, played from March 21 through May 13. Tilden had won 17 times for the entire year, per an Associated Press report, so a probable win-loss record at tour's end on May 13 was 36–17 in Vines' favor (slightly over 50 matches would have been played, per Ray Bowers).	1) (United States) Ellsworth Vines; 2) (United States) Bill Tilden
5	1934; February 19 – March 19	Professional Tour – France vs. United States Tilden defeated Cochet 8–2. Tilden defeated Plaa 10–0. Vines defeated Cochet 10–0. Vines defeated Plaa 8–2.	(United States) Ellsworth Vines (United States) Bill Tilden (France) Henri Cochet (France) Martin Plaa
6	1935; January 9 – April 29	Professional Tour Vines edged Tilden 9–3. Final results are unknown for the Tilden/Lott series, but through April 4 Tilden held an edge of 35–6.	1) (United States) Ellsworth Vines ?) (United States) Lester Stoefen ?) (United States) Bill Tilden ?) (United States) George Lott
7	1936; January – June	Professional Tour Near the end of February Tilden held a 19–4 edge over Barnes.	1) (United States) Bill Tilden; 2) (United States) Bruce Barnes
8	1936; October – November	Professional Tour The final standings of this tour of Japan, China and the Philippines are unknown, but at the end of the Japanese part of the tour, Vines led Tilden 8–1.	1) (United States) Ellsworth Vines; 2) (United States) Bill Tilden
9	1937; January – March (?)	Professional Tour Final standings of this North American tour are unknown, but Ray Bowers reports that Tilden was the overall winner.	(United States) Bill Tilden (France) Martin Plaa (Japan) Hytaro Satoh (United States) Alfred Chapin
10	1937; March 24 – April 5	Professional Tour Perry edged Tilden 4–1 in their own H2H series. They also met on two other occasions (April 9 and 10) when Tilden substituted for an injured Ellsworth Vines on the main World Pro Tour; Tilden won both times.	1) (United Kingdom) Fred Perry; 2) (United States) Bill Tilden
11	1937-38; December 19 – January 31	Professional Tour Final results for this tour of India are not known. Per Ray Bowers, on January 19 Tilden and Cochet had split their meetings with each other 7–7 while Ramillon had an edge over Burke. The tour continued into March in Ceylon, Kuala Lumpur, Singapore and Java, with unknown results.	(United States) Bill Tilden (France) Henri Cochet (France) Robert Ramillon (Republic of Ireland) Albert Burke
12	1939; May 16 – August 26	Professional Tour Final standings in this tour of Europe are unknown but Budge finished with an 8–2 edge over Tilden, who finished with a margin of 4 or 5 wins over Stoefen.	(United States) Don Budge (United States) Ellsworth Vines (United States) Bill Tilden (United States) Lester Stoefen (Germany) Hans Nüsslein (France) Henri Cochet
13	1939-40; October 1939 – January 1940	Professional Tour Final standings in this tour of the United States and Mexico are unknown.	(United Kingdom) Fred Perry (United States) Bill Tilden (United States) Lester Stoefen (United States) Ben Gorchakoff (United States) Bruce Barnes
14	1941; January 6 – May 10	World Pro Tour (5) Complete results of this North American tour are not known with certainty, but 49 of the matches are fully documented by Ray Bowers. In those matches, Budge prevailed 43–5 with one tie. The final outcome of the tour was probably 46–7 plus one tie.	1) (United States) Don Budge; 2) (United States) Bill Tilden

== Records ==
- Winning streak of Grand Slam events: 8 titles (1920–1926). Including 6 U.S. titles and 2 Wimbledon titles.
- Winning streak in single matches at Grand Slam events: 51 (1920–1926)
- Second best match winning % in Grand Slam events: 89.76%, with a record of 114–13 (1916–1930). Notice that Björn Borg has a winning percentage of 89.81% with a record of 141–16 (1974–1981) in a span time of about the half of Tilden. This highlights the longevity of Tilden's career.
- Winning streak in single matches at U.S. Championships: 42 (1920–1926)
- Most single titles at U.S. Championships: 7 (1920–1925, 1929)
- Most single finals at U.S. Championships: 10 (1918–1925, 1927, 1929)
- Won single + doubles + mixed doubles titles at same U.S. Championships event (1922, 1923)
- Winning streak in single matches: 98 (1924–1925)
- Best match winning % in one season: 98.73%, with a record of 78–1 (1925)
- Most appearances in final of Davis Cup: 11 with a record of 21–7 in singles (1920–1930)

== Career match performance year on year ==
1912–1951
Year	Won	Lost	%	Ref
1912	2	1	66.67%	
1913	3	2	60.00%	
1914	9	2	81.82%	
1915	10	3	76.92%	
1916	9	4	69.23%	
1917	10	3	76.92%	
1918	42	2	95.45%	
1919	65	4	94.20%	
1920	57	2	96.61%	
1921	31	3	91.18%	
1922	59	5	92.19%	
1923	59	1	98.33%	
1924	66	1	98.51%	
1925	89	1	98.89%	
1926	89	8	91.75%	
1927	100	5	95.24%	
1928	26	5	83.87%	
1929	58	9	86.57%	
1930	120	6	95.24%	
1931	63	16	79.75%	
1932	92	23	80.00%	
1933	38	8	82.61%	
1934	70	41	63.06%	
1935	59	19	75.64%	
1936	47	31	60.26%	
1937	39	17	69.64%	
1938	8	3	72.73%	
1939	27	32	45.76%	
1940	7	5	58.33%	
1941	9	33	21.43%	
1943	1	1	50.00%	
1945	5	2	71.43%	
1946	22	27	44.90%	
1951	2	4	33.33%	
Total	1393	329	80.89%	
