= 1917 in tennis =

This page covers all the important events in the sport of tennis in 1917. It provides the results of notable tournaments throughout the year on both the men's and women's ILTF tennis circuits.

== Australian Open ==
No event.

== French Open ==
Not a Grand Slam event.

== Wimbledon ==
No event.

== US Open ==
| Category | Champion(s) | Finalist(s) | Score |
|---|---|---|---|
| Men's singles | (United States) Robert Lindley Murray | (United States) Nathaniel W. Niles | 5–7, 8–6, 6–3, 6–3 |
| Women's singles | (Norway) Molla Bjurstedt | (United States) Marion Vanderhoef | 4–6, 6–0, 6–2 |
| Men's doubles | (United States) Fred Alexander (United States) Harold Throckmorton | (United States) Harry Johnson (United States) Irving Wright | 11–9, 6–4, 6–4 |
| Women's doubles | (Norway) Molla Bjurstedt (United States) Eleonora Sears | (United States) Phyllis Walsh (United States) Grace Moore LeRoy | 6–2, 6–4 |
| Mixed doubles | (Norway) Molla Bjurstedt (United States) Irving Wright | (United States) Florence Ballin (United States) Bill Tilden | 10–12, 6–1, 6–3 |
