= Pennsylvania Lawn Tennis Championships =

Coordinates: 40°0′56″N 75°17′53″W

Defunct tennis tournament
- Tour: Grand Prix circuit (1970–1974)
- Founded: 1894
- Abolished: 1974
- Location: Haverford, Pennsylvania, U.S.
- Venue: Merion Cricket Club
- Surface: Grass (1894–1969); Hard (1970–1972); Grass (1973–1974)

The Pennsylvania Lawn Tennis Championships, also known as the Pennsylvania State Lawn Tennis Championships and the Pennsylvania Grass Court Open Championships, was a tennis tournament played at the Merion Cricket Club in Haverford, Pennsylvania from 1894 to 1974.

== History ==
The first edition was held in 1894. The women's championships event began in 1901 the women's tournament was known as the Pennsylvania and Eastern States Championships. It was part of the Eastern Grass Court Circuit, a series of grass court tournaments on the American Eastern Seaboard in the lead up to the U. S. National Championships which also included Rye/South Orange, Meadow Club, Newport Casino, and others.

The men's events were part of the Grand Prix tennis circuit from 1970–1974 They were held on outdoor hard courts from 1970–72 and grass courts from 1973–1974.

== Finals ==
=== Men's singles ===
Pennsylvania Championships
Year	Champions	Runners-up	Score
1894	(United States) Marmaduke Smith	(United States) Charles Tete	6–3, 6–3, 6–4.
1895	(United States) Robert N. Wilson	(United States) S.W.B. Moorhead III	7–9, 6–1, 6–4, 6–0.
1896	(United States) Marmaduke Smith (2)	(United States) Robert N. Wilson	w.o.
1897	(United States) Marmaduke Smith (3)	(United States) Charles Tete	6–4, 2–6, 8–6, 7–5.
1898	(United States) James A. Hill	(United States) Marmaduke Smith	w.o.
1899	(United States) Robert N. Wilson (2)	(United States) James A. Hill	4–6, 4–6, 6–4, 6–4, 6–4.
1900	(United States) William Clothier	(United States) James A. Hill	w.o.
1901	(United States) William Clothier (2)	(United States) Robert N. Wilson	6–1, 6–2, 6–4.
1902	(United States) William Clothier (3)	(United States) Harry F. Allen	6–1, 6–4, 6–4.
1903	(United States) William Clothier (4)	(United States) Lyle Evans Mahan	6–4, 8–6, 6–2.
1904	(Australia) Edward Dewhurst	(United States) William Clothier	w.o.
1905	(Australia) Edward Dewhurst (2)	(United States) Joseph Roberts Carpenter	6–4, 1–6, 6–2, 6–2.
1906	(United States) William Clothier (5)	(Australia) Edward Dewhurst	6–3, 6–2, 6–4.
1907	(United States) Joseph Roberts Carpenter	(United States) William Clothier	w.o.
1908	(Australia) Edward Dewhurst (3)	(United States) Joseph Roberts Carpenter	6–0, 6–0, 9–7.
1909	(United States) Wallace F. Johnson	(Australia) Edward Dewhurst	w.o.
1910	(United States) Wallace F. Johnson (2)	(United States) Percy Dwight Siverd	6–2, 6–2, 6–3.
1911	(United States) Percy Dwight Siverd	(United States) Wallace F. Johnson	8–6, 9–7, 6–1.
1912	(United States) R. Norris Williams	(United States) Percy Dwight Siverd	6–1, 6–1, 6–1.
1913	(United States) Wallace F. Johnson (3)	(United States) Bill Tilden II	7–5, 6–1, 6–0.
1914	(United States) R. Norris Williams (2)	(United States) Bill Tilden II	6–4, 6–0, 3–6, 6–2.
1915	(United States) Joseph J. Armstrong	(United States) R. Norris Williams	w.o.
1916	(United States) Willis E. Davis	(United States) Craig Biddle	5–7, 6–3, 6–1, 6–3.
1917	(United States) E.B. Mosier	(United States) C. Rogers	8–6, 6–3, 6–2.
1918	(United States) Bill Tilden II	(United States) Philip B. Hawk	6–2, 6–0, 6–0.
1919	(United States) Bill Tilden II (2)	(United States) Wallace F. Johnson	6–4, 4–6, 6–3, 6–8, 6–2.
1920	(United States) Wallace F. Johnson (4)	(United States) Carl Fischer	6-0 6-3 6-2.
1921	(United States) Wallace F. Johnson (5)	(United States) Stanley W. Pearson	9–7, 6–1, 6–2.
1922	(United States) Wallace F. Johnson (6)	(United States) Stanley W. Pearson	6–1, 6–3, 6–3.
1923	(United States) Wallace F. Johnson (7)	(United States) Carl Fischer	6–3, 6–3, 6–4.
1924	(United States) Wallace F. Johnson (8)	(United States) Fritz Mercur	7–5, 6–8, 6–4, 7–5.
1925	(United States) Bill Tilden II (3)	(United States) R. Norris Williams	0–6, 6–2, 6–4, 1–6, 6–4.
1926	(Spain) Manuel Alonso Areizaga	(United States) Stanley W. Pearson	6–3, 2–6, 6–2, 9–7.
1927	(United States) R. Norris Williams (3)	(Spain) Manuel Alonso Areizaga	6–3, 6–3, 8–10, 6–2.
1928	(United States) John Van Ryn	(United States) Frank Shields	10–8, 7–5, 6–1.
1929	(United States) Fritz Mercur	(United States) J. Gilbert (Gil) Hall	6–3, 11–9, 8–6.
1930	(United States) Fritz Mercur (2)	(United States) Dolf Edward Muehleisen	6–3, 6–4, 6–4.
1931	(United States) Samuel Bellows Gilpin III	(United States) Gabriel Lavine	6–3, 6–4, 6–4.
1932	(United States) Eugene McCauliff	(United States) Carl Fischer	6–0, 6–2, 6–2.
1933	(United States) Martin Buxby	(United States) Samuel Bellows Gilpin III	6–4, 6–3, 6–8, 1–6, 6–2.
1934	(United States) Wilmer Allison	(United States) John Van Ryn	6–0, 6–2, 6–0.
1935	(United States) Barnie Welsh	(United States) William Tilden III	6–3, 6–2, 6–2.
1936	(United States) Gabriel Lavine	(United States) Gilbert Hunt	3–6, 12–10, 6–2 6–2.
1937	(United States) Robert Leland Harman	(United States) Gilbert Hunt	6–2, 4–6, 6–2, 6–3.
1940	(United States) Gilbert Hunt	(United States) Isadore Bellis	3–6, 7–5, 6–1, 6–4.
1941	(United States) Isadore Bellis	(United States) Gilbert Hunt	9–7, 6–2, 6–4.
1942–45	No competition (due to WWII)		
1946	(United States) Vic Seixas	(United States) Norman Brooks	4–6, 6–4, 9–7, 6–8, 6–2.
1947	(United States) Vic Seixas (2)	(United States) Sidney Wood	6–1, 6–2, 3–6, 6–4.
1948	(United States) Samuel Match	(United States) Harry Likas	6–1, 6–2, 6–2.
1949	(United States) Pancho Gonzales	(United States) Vic Seixas	6–4, 6–1, 6–0.
1950	(United States) Richard Savitt	(United States) Edward Moylan	3–6, 9–11, 6–2, 6–1, 6–2.
1951	(United States) Vic Seixas (3)	(United States) Straight Clark	8–6, 8–6, 6–3.
1952	(United States) Vic Seixas (4)	(United States) Straight Clark	8–6, 6–4, 6–1.
1953	(United States) Vic Seixas (5)	(United States) Tony Trabert	6–4, 6–2, 6–4.
1954	(United States) Vic Seixas (6)	(United States) Art Larsen	6–3, 6–1, 4–6, 6-4.
1955	(United States) Tony Trabert	(United States) Vic Seixas	6–1, 6–2, 6–3.
1956	(United States) Vic Seixas (7)	(United States) Arthur Larsen	7–5, 6–1, 6–4.
1957	(Australia) Ashley Cooper	(United States) Vic Seixas	6–3, 7–9, 6–4, 7–5.
1958	(United States) Barry MacKay (tennis)	(Peru) Alex Olmedo	6–8, 6–4, 4–6, 6–3, 14–12.
1959	(United States) Barry MacKay (tennis) (2)	(South Africa) Ian Vermaak	9–7, 10–8, 6–0.
1960	(Australia) Rod Laver	(United States) Ronald Holmberg	9–7, 8–6, 6–3.
1961	(United States) Jon Douglas	(United States) Frank Froehling	6–2, 6–3, 6–1.
1962	(United States) Bill Bond	(United States) Ronald Holmberg	6–4, 6–4, 2–6, 2–6, 6–3.
1963	(United States) Chuck McKinley	(United States) Dennis Ralston	6–2, 6–2, 6–4.
1964	(United States) Dennis Ralston	(United States) Chuck McKinley	6–1, 7–5, 6–3
1965	(Puerto Rico) Charles Pasarell	(Australia) Roy Emerson	6–4, 1–6, 6–3, 6–4
1966	(United States) Clark Graebner	(United States) Stan Smith	6–3, 6–4, 6–3.
1967	(South Africa) Cliff Drysdale	(United States) Clark Graebner	3–6, 3–6, 11–9, 6–2, 7–5.
1968	(United States) Arthur Ashe	(United States) Marty Riessen	6–2, 6–3, 6–3.
↓ Open era ↓
1969	(United States) Cliff Richey	(Australia) Robert Carmichael	6–4, 7–9, 6–2, 6–4.
1970^{1}	(Australia) Ray Ruffels	(Chile) Jaime Fillol	6–2, 7–6, 6–3.
1971	(United States) Clark Graebner (2)	(United States) Dick Stockton	6–2, 6–4, 6–7, 7–5.
1972	(United Kingdom) Roger Taylor	(Australia) Malcolm Anderson	6–4, 6–0, 6–4.
1973	(United States) Mike Estep	(United States) Gene Scott	7–5, 3–6, 7–6, 3–6, 7–5.
1974	(United Kingdom) John Lloyd	(United States) John Whitlinger	6–0, 4–6, 6–3, 7–5.

^{1}results included on ITF website, but not ATP website

=== Men's doubles ===
Year	Champions	Runners-up	Score
1962	(United States) Arthur Ashe (United States) Larry Nagler	(United States) Bill Bond (United States) Ramsey Earnhart	6–4, 15–13, 6–4
1963	(United States) Clark Graebner (United States) Marty Riessen	(United States) Chuck McKinley (United States) Dennis Ralston	6–4, 0–6, 6–4, 5–7, 6–3
1964	(United States) Frank Froehling (United States) Charlie Pasarell	(United States) Clark Graebner (United States) Marty Riessen	6–3, 15–13, 6–3
1966	(United States) Stan Smith (United States) Robert Lutz	(Australia) Tony Roche (Australia) Ray Ruffels	7–9, 6–4, 9–11, 7–5, 6–4
1967	(United States) Clark Graebner (United States) Marty Riessen	(Australia) Owen Davidson (Australia) Bill Bowrey	6–2, 9–11, 7–5
1968		(United States) Arthur Ashe (United States) Marty Riessen vs. (United States) Charlie Pasarell (United States) Clark Graebner	9–7, 10–8, 2–6, 28–30, SUS
1969	(Australia) Bill Bowrey (United States) Jim Osborne	(Australia) Dick Crealy (Australia) Allan Stone	6–4, 6–3
1970	(Australia) Bill Bowrey (Australia) Ray Ruffels	(United States) Jim McManus (United States) Jim Osborne	3–6, 6–2, 7–5
1971	(United States) Clark Graebner (United States) Jim Osborne	(United States) Robert McKinley (United States) Dick Stockton	7–6, 6–3
1972	(Australia) Ross Case (Australia) Geoff Masters	(United States) Jeff Austin (United States) Mike Estep	6–7, 6–4, 6–4
1973	(Australia) Colin Dibley (Australia) Allan Stone	(United States) John Austin (United States) Fred McNair	7–6, 6–3
1974	(United States) Roy Barth (Venezuela) Humphrey Hose	(United States) Mike Machette (United States) Fred McNair	7–6, 6–2

=== Women's singles ===
(incomplete roll)

Pennsylvania and Eastern States Championships
Year	Champions	Runners-up	Score
1901	(United States) Jean B. Clark	(United States) Elizabeth Larned	6–1, 4–6, 6–8, 6–4, 6–3
1902	(United States) Helen Chapman	(United States) Dorothea Morris Baird	3–6, 6–3, 6–3,
1903	(United States) Marion Jones	?	?
1904	(United States) Dorothy Rastall Hibbs	(United States) Mira Rastall	6–0, 6–2,
1905	(United States) Elizabeth Moore	(United States) Dorothy Rastall Hibbs	6-1, 6-1
1906	(United States) Evelyn Sears	(United States) Phyllis Green	6–3, 6–3,
1907	(United States) Edith Rotch	(United States) Eleonora Sears	6–1, 6–4 ,
1908	(United States) Eleonora Sears	?	?
1909	(United States) Eleonora Sears (2)	(United States) Edith Rotch	6–3, 2–6, 6–3
1910	(United States) Louise Hammond	(United States) Eleonora Sears	1–6, 7–5, 7–5
1911	(United States) Louise Hammond (2)	(United States) Florence Sutton	3–6, 6–3, 6–3
1912	(United States) Maud Barger-Wallach	(United States) Edna Wildey	7–5, 6–4
1913	(United States) Mary Browne	(United States) Edna Wildey	6–2, 6–4
1914	(United States) Louise Hammond (3)	(United States) Marion Fenno	3–6, 9–7, 6–2
1915	(United States) Helen Homans McLean	(United States) Alice Day Beard	6–0, 6–2
1916	(Norway) Molla Bjurstedt	(United States) Eleonora Sears	6–2, 6–3
1917	(United States) Flora Brown Harvey	(United States) Suzanne White	w.o.
1918	(United States) Eleonora Sears (3)	(United States) Emma Gillig Betz	6–0, 6–1
1919	(United States) Clare Cassell	(United States) Anne Townsend	6–0, 6–3
1920	(United States) Molly Thayer	(United States) Anne Townsend	6–4, 6–4
1921	(United States) Anne Townsend	(United States) Phyllis Walsh	6–3, 3–6, 6–4
1922	(United States) Florence Ballin	(United States) Anne Townsend	6–4, 6–3
1923	(United States) Anne Townsend (2)	(United States) Molly Thayer	6–3, 4–6, 6–3
1924	(United States) Molly Thayer (2)	(United States) Barbara Huff	9–7, 5–7, 6–4
1925	(United States) Marion Zinderstein Jessup	(United States) Molly Thayer	6–4, 6–0
1926	(United States) Martha Bayard	(United States) Anne Townsend	6–2, 6–0
1927	(United States) Molly Thayer (3)	(United States) Ida Wilson Huff	6–1, 6–3
1928	(United States) Molly Thayer (4)	(United States) Anne Townsend	7–5, 7–5
1929	(United States) Marjorie Gladman	(United States) Anne Townsend	6–0, 6–2
1930	(United States) Virginia Hilleary	(United States) Dorothy Andrus	6–3, 6–2
1931	(United States) Marion Zinderstein Jessup (2)	(United States) Virginia Hilleary	6–1, 6–1
1932	(United States) Virginia Hilleary (2)	(United States) Marion Zinderstein Jessup	7–9, 6–4, 6–3
1933	(United States) Marion Zinderstein Jessup (3)	(United States) Anne Townsend	6–1, 6–1
1934	(United States) Marion Zinderstein Jessup (4)	(United States) Marjorie Gladman Van Ryn	6–4, 6–3
1935	(United States) Helen Pedersen	(United States) Anna Fuller Brunie	6–2, 6–1
1936	(United States) Dorothy Workman	(United States) Marion Zinderstein Jessup	4–6, 6–2, 6–4
1937	(United States) Eunice Dean	(United States) Cecilia Riegel	6–3, 9–11, 6–4
1938	(United States) Eunice Dean (2)	(United States) Theodosia Smith	6–4, 6–1
1939	(United States) Anne Page	(United States) Barbara Strobhar	6–2, 11–9
1940	(United States) Helen Jacobs	(United States) Eunice Dean	6–1, 6–2
1941	(United States) Helen Jacobs (2)	(United States) Hope Knowles	6–0, 6–1
1942	(United States) Hope Knowles	(United States) Helen Pedersen Rihbany	3–6, 8–6, 6–0
1943	(United States) Barbara Strobhar Clement	(United States) Peggy Welsh	6–2, 10–8
1944	(United States) Pauline Betz	(United States) Virginia Wolfenden Kovacs	6–2, 6–3
1945	(United States) Dottie Head	(United States) Barbara Scofield	6–4, 6–4
1946	(United States) Virginia Wolfenden Kovacs	(United States) Dottie Head	6–1, 11–9
1947	(United States) Shirley Fry	(United States) Dottie Head	7–5 6–3
1948	(United States) Virginia Wolfenden Kovacs (2)	(United States) Madge Harshaw Vosters	6–2, 6–4
1949	(United States) Beverly Baker	(United States) Baba Madden Lewis	6–1, 6–2
1950	(United States) Maureen Connolly	(United States) Helen Pastall Perez	6–2, 4–6, 6–3
1951	(United States) Maureen Connolly (2)	(United States) Betty Rosenquest	7–5, 4–6, 7–5
1952	(United States) Maureen Connolly (3)	(United States) Madge Harshaw Vosters	6–2, 6–0
1953	(United States) Louise Brough	(United States) Margaret Osborne duPont	8–6, 6–2
1954	(United States) Beverly Baker Fleitz (2)	(United States) Louise Brough	6–4, 2–6, 8–6
1955	(United States) Louise Brough (2)	(United States) Althea Gibson	1–6, 6–2, 6–1
1956	(United States) Althea Gibson	(United States) Margaret Osborne duPont	6–1, 6–4
1957	(United States) Dottie Head Knode (2)	(United States) Darlene Hard	6–4, 6–3
1958	(United States) Althea Gibson (2)	(United States) Sally Moore	7–5, 2–6, 6–4
1959	(South Africa) Sandra Reynolds	(South Africa) Renee Schuurman	1–6, 6–1, 6–4
1960	(United States) Mimi Arnold	(United States) Margaret Osborne duPont	6–1, 6–2
1961	(United States) Billie Jean Moffitt	(United States) Justina Bricka	6–3, 6–4
1962	(Australia) Margaret Smith	(United States) Karen Hantze Susman	6–4, 10–8
1963	(United States) Darlene Hard	(Australia) Margaret Smith	6–2, 7–9, 6–3
1964	(United States) Justina Bricka	(United States) Carole Caldwell Graebner	6–4, 18–16
1965	(United States) Billie Jean Moffitt (2)	(United States) Carole Caldwell Graebner	6–1, 6–2
1966	(Australia) Karen Krantzcke	(United States) Peaches Bartkowicz	6–1, 6–2
1967	(United States) Mary-Ann Eisel	(United States) Carole Caldwell Graebner	6–1, 6–3
1968	(United States) Kristy Pigeon	(United States) Vicky Rogers	9–7, 6–0
↓ Open era ↓
1969	(Australia) Margaret Smith Court (2)	(United Kingdom) Virginia Wade	6–4, 6–4
1970	(Australia) Margaret Smith Court (3)	(South Africa) Pat Walkden	6–1, 6–0
1971	(United States) Eliza Pande	(Australia) Lesley Turner Bowrey	0–6, 6–2, 6-3
1972	(United Kingdom) Virginia Wade	(United States) Laurie Fleming	6–4, 6–1
1974	(United States) Kathy May	(United States) Barbara Jordan	6–3, 7–5
1975	(United States) Sandy Stap	(United States) Sally Moore	6–3, 7–5
