= 1918 in tennis =

This page covers all the important events in the sport of tennis in 1918. It provides the results of notable tournaments throughout the year on both the men's and women's ILTF tennis circuits.

== Australian Open ==
No event.

== French Open ==
Not a Grand Slam event.

== Wimbledon ==
No event.

== US Open ==
Category	Champion(s)	Finalist(s)	Score
Men's singles	(United States) Robert Lindley Murray	(United States) Bill Tilden	6–3, 6–1, 7–5
Women's singles	(Norway) Molla Bjurstedt	(United States) Eleanor Goss	6–4, 6–3
Men's doubles	(United States) Bill Tilden (United States) Vincent Richards	(United States) Fred Alexander (United States) Beals Wright	6–3, 6–4, 3–6, 2–6, 6–4
Women's doubles	(United States) Marion Zinderstein (United States) Eleonora Sears	(Norway) Molla Bjurstedt (United States) Mrs. Rogge	7–5, 8–6
Mixed doubles	(United States) Hazel Wightman (United States) Irving Wright	(Norway) Molla Bjurstedt (United States) Fred Alexander	6–2, 6–4
