= 1917 U.S. National Championships – Men's singles =

Men's singles
- 1917 U.S. National Championships

Final
- Champion: (United States) Robert Lindley Murray
- Runner-up: (United States) Nathaniel W. Niles
- Score: 5–7, 8–6, 6–3, 6–3

Events
| Singles | men | women |
| Doubles | men | women |
- U.S. National Championships

Robert Lindley Murray defeated Nathaniel W. Niles 5–7, 8–6, 6–3, 6–3 in the final to win the men's singles tennis title at the 1917 U.S. National Championships. The event was held at the West Side Tennis Club in Forest Hills, New York. The tournament was renamed National Patriotic Tournament in support of the war effort. No trophies were handed out to the winners and the entrance fees were dedicated to the American Red Cross.

== Final eight ==
Quarterfinals
(United States) R. Lindley Murray | 4 | 6 | 6 | 4 | 6
(United States) Craig Biddle | 6 | 1 | 4 | 6 | 2
(United States) John Strachan | 6 | 2 | 6 | 6
(United States) Chuck Garland | 1 | 6 | 2 | 3
(United States) Nathaniel W. Niles | 6 | 6 | 6
(United States) Clarence Griffin | 1 | 3 | 0
(United States) Harold Throckmorton | 1 | 6 | 4 | 6 | 3
(United States) R. Norris Williams | 6 | 4 | 6 | 0 | 6

Semifinals
(United States) R. Lindley Murray | 4 | 6 | 6 | 6
(United States) John Strachan | 6 | 3 | 3 | 1
(United States) Nathaniel W. Niles | 6 | 4 | 6 | 6
(United States) R. Norris Williams | 2 | 6 | 4 | 3

Final
(United States) R. Lindley Murray | 5 | 8 | 6 | 6
(United States) Nathaniel W. Niles | 7 | 6 | 3 | 3

=== Earlier rounds ===
==== Section 1 ====
First round
(United States) Fixman | w/ | o
(United States) Murray
(United States) Emerson | 2 | 1
(United States) Westfall | 6 | 6
(United States) Pell | 6 | 6
(United States) Rosenbaum | 3 | 3
(Austria) Salm | 0 | 1
(United States) Tilden | 6 | 6
(United States) Mathey
(United States) Burrows | w/ | o
(United States) Walker | 6 | 6
(United States) Seymour | 2 | 0
(United States) Alexander | 6 | 6
(United States) Bassford | 1 | 0
(United States) Biddle
(United States) Major | w/ | o

Second round
(United States) Murray | 6 | 6
(United States) Westfall | 2 | 2
(United States) Pell | 3 | 3
(United States) Tilden | 6 | 6
(United States) Mathey | 6 | 6
(United States) Walker | 3 | 1
(United States) Alexander | 1 | 6 | 0
(United States) Biddle | 6 | 4 | 6

Third round
(United States) Murray | 3 | 6 | 6 | 6
(United States) Tilden | 6 | 4 | 3 | 3
(United States) Mathey | 4 | 14 | 3 | 3
(United States) Biddle | 6 | 12 | 6 | 6

Quarterfinals
(United States) Murray | 4 | 6 | 6 | 4 | 6
(United States) Biddle | 6 | 1 | 4 | 6 | 2

==== Section 2 ====
First round
(United States) Strachan
(United States) Letson | w/ | o
(United States) Bowman | w/ | o
(United States) Binzen
(United States) MacPherson
(United States) Harris | w/ | o
(United States) Wagner | 6 | 6
(United States) Berk | 3 | 0
(United States) Watters | 7 | 6
(United States) Allen | 5 | 4
(Japan) Kashio | 7 | 7 | 10
(United States) Brown Ransom | 9 | 5 | 8
(United States) Garland | 6 | 7
(United States) Mahan | 1 | 5
(United States) Dionne | 4 | 6 | 0
(United States) Behr | 6 | 2 | 6

Second round
(United States) Strachan | 6 | 6
(United States) Binzen | 1 | 1
(United States) MacPherson | 6 | 6
(United States) Wagner | 1 | 4
(United States) Watters | 6 | 6
(Japan) Kashio | 3 | 4
(United States) Garland | 6 | 6
(United States) Behr | 2 | 4

Third round
(United States) Strachan | 6 | 2 | 6 | 6
(United States) MacPherson | 1 | 6 | 0 | 3
(United States) Watters | 4 | 1 | 3
(United States) Garland | 6 | 6 | 6

Quarterfinals
(United States) Strachan | 6 | 2 | 6 | 6
(United States) Garland | 1 | 6 | 2 | 3

==== Section 3 ====
First round
(United States) Voshell | 4 | 6' | 3
(United States) Ward | 6 | 1 | 6
(United States) Inman | 1 | 3
(United States) Parker | 6 | 6
(United States) Niles | 6 | 6
(United States) Allen | 4 | 2
(United States) Chambers
(United States) Adoue | w/ | o
(United States) Armstrong | w/ | o
(United States) Beck
(United States) Vail | 6 | 9
(United States) Vilsack | 3 | 7
(United States) Griffin | 6 | 6
(United States) MacMullen | 2 | 3
(United States) Van Deventer
(United States) Mack | w/ | o

Second round
(United States) Ward | 6 | 6
(United States) Parker | 2 | 2
(United States) Niles | 6 | 6
(United States) Chambers | 4 | 1
(United States) Beck | 6 | 6
(United States) Vail | 1 | 3
(United States) Griffin | 6 | 6
(United States) Van Deventer | 2 | 2

Third round
(United States) Ward | 6 | 3 | 1 | 2
(United States) Niles | 3 | 6 | 6 | 6
(United States) Beck | 2 | 6 | 2
(United States) Griffin | 6 | 8 | 6

Quarterfinals
(United States) Niles | 6 | 6 | 6
(United States) Griffin | 1 | 3 | 0

==== Section 4 ====
First round
(United States) Throckmorton | 6 | 6
(United States) Johnson | 4 | 4
(United States) Baggs
(United States) O Neale | w/ | o
(United States) Washburn | 6 | 6
(United States) Dickinson | 3 | 3
(United States) Tilden | w/ | o
(United States) McClave
(United States) Whitman | w/ | o
(United States) Wright
(United States) Van Deventer | 2 | 4
(United States) Beekman | 6 | 6
(United States) Williams | 6 | 6
(United States) Pate | 2 | 2
(United States) French | 3 | 6 | 6
(United States) James | 6 | 3 | 1

Second round
(United States) Throckmorton | 7 | 6
(United States) Baggs | 5 | 3
(United States) Washburn | 6 | 6
(United States) McClave | 0 | 2
(United States) Wright | 7 | 10 | 2
(United States) Beekman | 5 | 12 | 6
(United States) Williams | 6 | 6
(United States) French | 3 | 2

Third round
(United States) Throckmorton | 4 | 6 | 6 | 6
(United States) Washburn | 6 | 2 | 4 | 4
(United States) Beekman | 8 | 4 | 7 | 3
(United States) Williams | 6 | 6 | 9 | 6

Quarterfinals
(United States) Throckmorton | 1 | 6 | 4 | 6 | 3
(United States) Williams | 6 | 4 | 6 | 0 | 6
