= 1917 U.S. National Championships (tennis) =

- Date: August 20 – 25 (M); June 18 – 23 (W)
- Edition: 37th
- Category: Grand Slam (ITF)
- Surface: Grass
- Location: Forest Hills, Queens; New York City, New York (M); Chestnut Hill, PA, U.S. (W)
- Venue: West Side Tennis Club (M); Philadelphia Cricket Club (W)

Champions

Men's singles
- (United States) Robert Lindley Murray

Women's singles
- (Norway) Molla Bjurstedt

Men's doubles
- (United States) Fred Alexander / (United States) Harold Throckmorton

Women's doubles
- (Norway) Molla Bjurstedt / (United States) Eleonora Sears

Mixed doubles
- (Norway) Molla Bjurstedt / (United States) Irving Wright
- U.S. National Championships

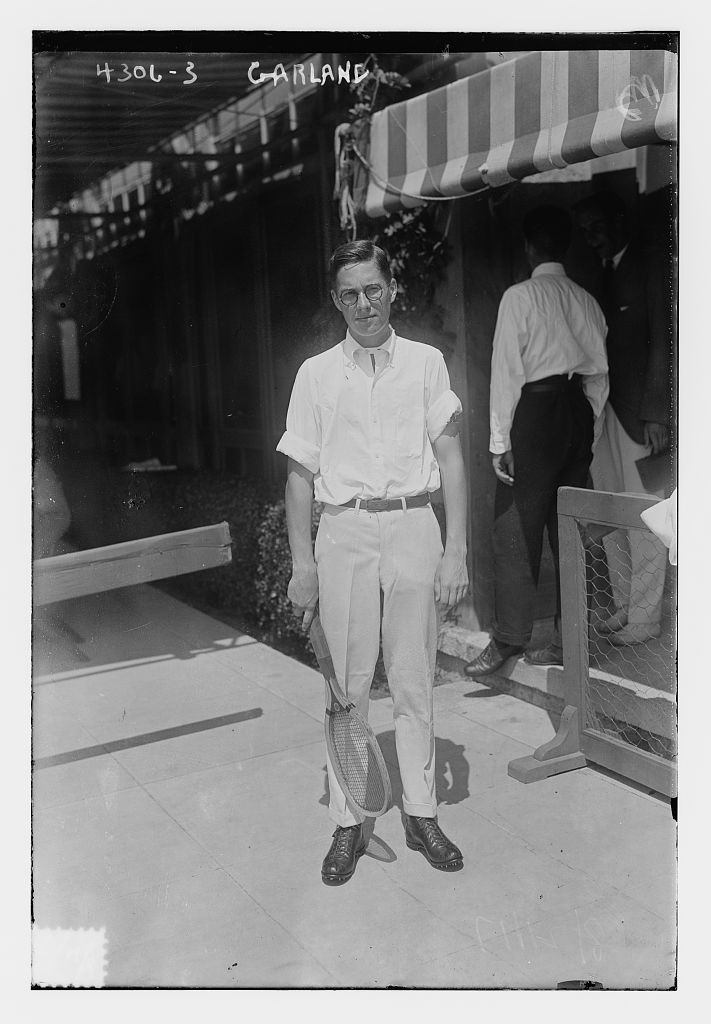
Chuck Garland at the 1917 U.S. National Championships

The 1917 U.S. National Championships (now known as the US Open), officially renamed that year to National Patriotic Tournament, was a tennis tournament that took place on the outdoor grass courts at the West Side Tennis Club, Forest Hills in New York City, New York. The tournament ran from August 20 until August 25. It was the 37th staging of the U.S. National Championships and due to World War I the only Grand Slam tennis event of the year.

== National Patriotic Tournament ==
The tournament was renamed National Patriotic Tournament in support of the war effort. No trophies were handed out to the winners and the entrance fees were dedicated to the American Red Cross. Robert Lindley Murray defeated Bostonian Nathaniel W. Niles in four sets in the men's final.

In the commemorative book 'Fifty Years of Lawn Tennis in the United States', published by the USLTA in 1931, Lindley Murray commented on the final: "I succeeded in beating Nat Niles 5–7, 8–6, 6–3, 6–3, plenty of indication that the match was close and hard fought. I remember well that, try as I would, I could not get into the full swing of my game those first two sets. This was because my opponent was driving beautifully, particularly low, fast ones to my backhand. In addition he was lobbing so accurately and deeply that, try as I would, I could not bring off my kills. Nat led me one set to love and 6–5 in the second set. which was mighty close to being two sets down. But about that time my game began to get going. Up until that time I had just been missing and while desperately dashing all over the court my shots would end in just hitting the net or just going out. From the twelfth game of the second set, on for the rest of the match, things began to go right, and at the end I felt as if I was playing as well as I know how."

== Finals ==
=== Men's singles ===
(United States) Robert Lindley Murray defeated (United States) Nathaniel W. Niles 5–7, 8–6, 6–3, 6–3

=== Women's singles ===
(Norway) Molla Bjurstedt defeated (United States) Marion Vanderhoef 4–6, 6–0, 6–2

=== Men's doubles ===
(United States) Fred Alexander / (United States) Harold Throckmorton defeated (United States) Harry Johnson / (United States) Irving Wright 11–9, 6–4, 6–4

=== Women's doubles ===
(Norway) Molla Bjurstedt / (United States) Eleonora Sears defeated (United States) Phyllis Walsh / (United States) Grace Moore LeRoy 6–2, 6–4

=== Mixed doubles ===
(Norway) Molla Bjurstedt / (United States) Irving Wright defeated (United States) Florence Ballin / (United States) Bill Tilden 10–12, 6–1, 6–3

Preceded by 1916 U.S. National Championships	Grand Slams	Succeeded by 1918 U.S. National Championships
