= Percy Dwight Siverd =

American tennis player

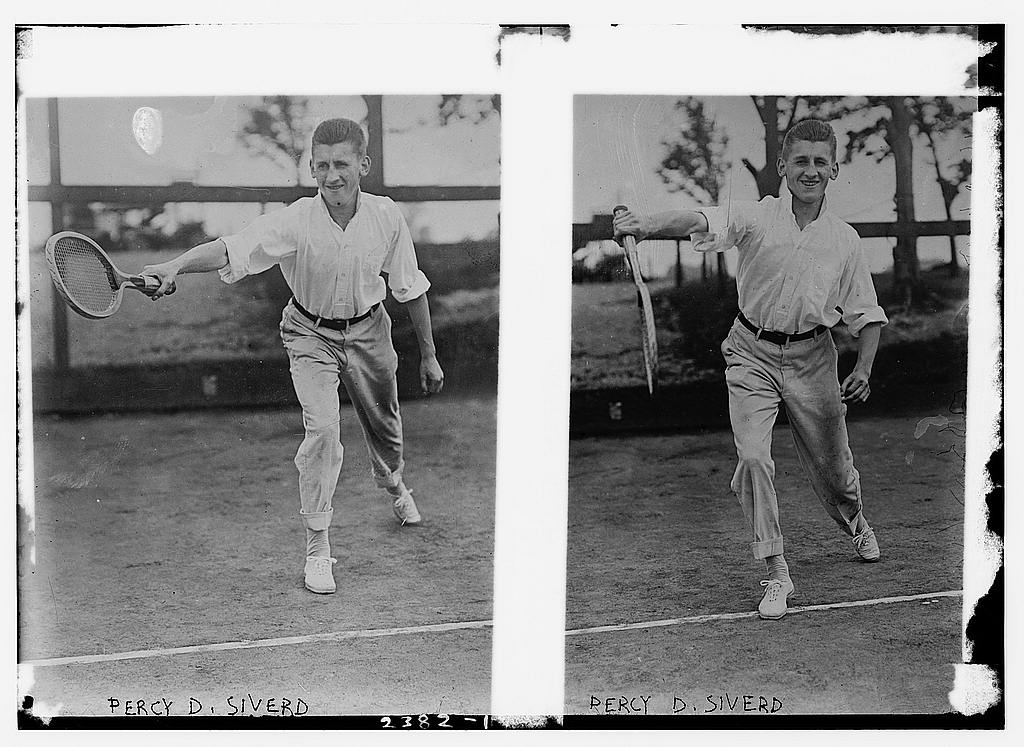
Siverd in 1911-1912

Percy Dwight Siverd (March 6, 1889 – February 14, 1974) was an American tennis player. He was the 1911 U.S. Men's Clay Court finalist and Pennsylvania champion in 1912.

== Biography ==
He was born on March 6, 1889, in Pittsburgh, Pennsylvania. He died on February 14, 1974, in Cleveland, Ohio.
