= 1918 U.S. National Championships (tennis) =

- Date: August 26 – September 3 (M); June 17 – 22 (W)
- Edition: 38th
- Category: Grand Slam (ITF)
- Surface: Grass
- Location: Forest Hills, Queens; New York City, New York (M); Chestnut Hill, PA, U.S. (W)
- Venue: West Side Tennis Club (M); Philadelphia Cricket Club (W)

Champions

Men's singles
- (United States) Robert Lindley Murray

Women's singles
- (Norway) Molla Bjurstedt

Men's doubles
- (United States) Bill Tilden / (United States) Vincent Richards

Women's doubles
- (United States) Marion Zinderstein / (United States) Eleonora Sears

Mixed doubles
- (United States) Hazel Wightman / (United States) Irving Wright
← 1917 ·	U.S. National Championships	· 1919 →

The 1918 U.S. National Championships (now known as the US Open) was a tennis tournament that took place on the outdoor grass courts at the West Side Tennis Club, Forest Hills in New York City, New York. The women's tournament was held from June 17 until June 22 while the men's tournament ran from August 26 until September 3. It was the 38th staging of the U.S. National Championships and due to World War I the only Grand Slam tennis event of the year.

== Finals ==
=== Men's singles ===
(United States) Robert Lindley Murray defeated (United States) Bill Tilden 6–3, 6–1, 7–5

=== Women's singles ===
(Norway) Molla Bjurstedt defeated (United States) Eleanor Goss 6–4, 6–3

=== Men's doubles ===
(United States) Bill Tilden / (United States) Vincent Richards defeated (United States) Fred Alexander / (United States) Beals Wright 6–3, 6–4, 3–6, 2–6, 6–4

=== Women's doubles ===
(United States) Marion Zinderstein / (United States) Eleonora Sears defeated (Norway) Molla Bjurstedt / (United States) Mrs. Rogge 7–5, 8–6

=== Mixed doubles ===
(United States) Hazel Wightman / (United States) Irving Wright defeated (Norway) Molla Bjurstedt / (United States) Fred Alexander 6–2, 6–4

Preceded by 1917 U.S. National Championships	Grand Slams	Succeeded by 1919 Wimbledon Championships
