= Bob Lutz =

Bob Lutz or Robert Lutz may refer to:

- Bob Lutz (American football) (active 1969-2012), American high school football coach
- Bobby Lutz (basketball) (born 1958), American college basketball coach
- Bob Lutz (businessman) (born 1932), retired auto industry executive
- Bob Lutz (tennis) (born 1947), American tennis player of the 1970s

== See also ==
- Lutz
