= Heights Casino Indoor Invitation =

Defunct tennis tournament
- Tour: ILTF World Circuit
- Founded: 1916; 110 years ago
- Abolished: 1939; 87 years ago
- Location: Brooklyn, New York City, United States
- Venue: Heifhts Casino
- Surface: Wood / indoor

The Heights Casino Indoor Invitation was a combined indoor wood court tennis tournament founded in 1916. Also known as the Brooklyn Heights Casino Indoor, the event was played at the Heights Casino, Brooklyn Heights, Brooklyn, New York City, United States until 1939 when it was discontinued due to World War II.

Notable winners of the men's singles event included; Bill Tilden, Vinnie Richards. Winners of the women's event included Molla Mallory.
