= Walter Pate =

American politician

Walter Thurston Pate

Member of the Mississippi House of Representatives from the Hinds County district
- In office January 1920 - 1925

Personal details
- Born: August 25, 1874 Yalobusha County, Mississippi
- Died: September 17, 1950 (aged 76) Pascagoula, Mississippi, U.S.
- Party: Democrat

Walter Thurston Pate Sr. (August 25, 1874 - September 17, 1950) was a politician in the Democratic Party who served in the Mississippi House of Representatives from 1920 to 1925.

== Biography ==
Pate was born on August 25, 1874, in Airmount, Yalobusha County, Mississippi. His parents were Larkin and Susan (Tankersley) Pate. He attended the University of Mississippi from 1894 to 1897. He married Irene McLaurin, the daughter of Anselm J. McLaurin, in 1907, and after her death in 1911, he married Sarah Calhoon Hall in 1920. They had one son. He served in the U. S. Army in World War I as a captain. He was elected to the Mississippi House of Representatives, representing Hinds County, from 1920 to 1924. After winning reelection, he resigned his office in 1925. He died on September 17, 1950, in an accident during a fishing trip in Pascagoula.
