= Rhode Island State Championships =

Defunct tennis tournament
- Founded: 1888; 137 years ago
- Abolished: 1969; 56 years ago
- Location: Providence, Rhode Island, United States
- Venue: Agawam Hunt Club
- Surface: Grass

The Rhode Island State Championships or simply the Rhode Island Championships was an early men's and women's grass court tennis tournament founded in 1888 as the Rhode Island Lawn Tennis Tournament and Championship. and mainly played at Agawam Hunt Club, Providence, Rhode Island, United States until 1969.

== History ==
In 1888 the first Rhode Island Lawn Tennis Tournament and Championship was established. The tournament was initially a men's only event until 1914 when a women's tournament was added to the schedule. It was part of the Eastern Lawn Tennis Association circuit. In 1924 when the USNLTA joined the International Lawn Tennis Federation it became part of ILTF Circuit was played annually through till 1969 when it was discontinued. Former winners of the men's title included; Clarence R. Budlong, Bill Tilden, Vinnie Richards, Bud Chandler, John Doeg, Gardnar Mulloy, and Tony Vincent. Previous winners of the women's event included Marion Zinderstein, Edith Sigourney, Molla Bjurstedt Mallory, Maud Rosenbaum and Shirley Fry.
