= Harold Throckmorton =

American tennis player

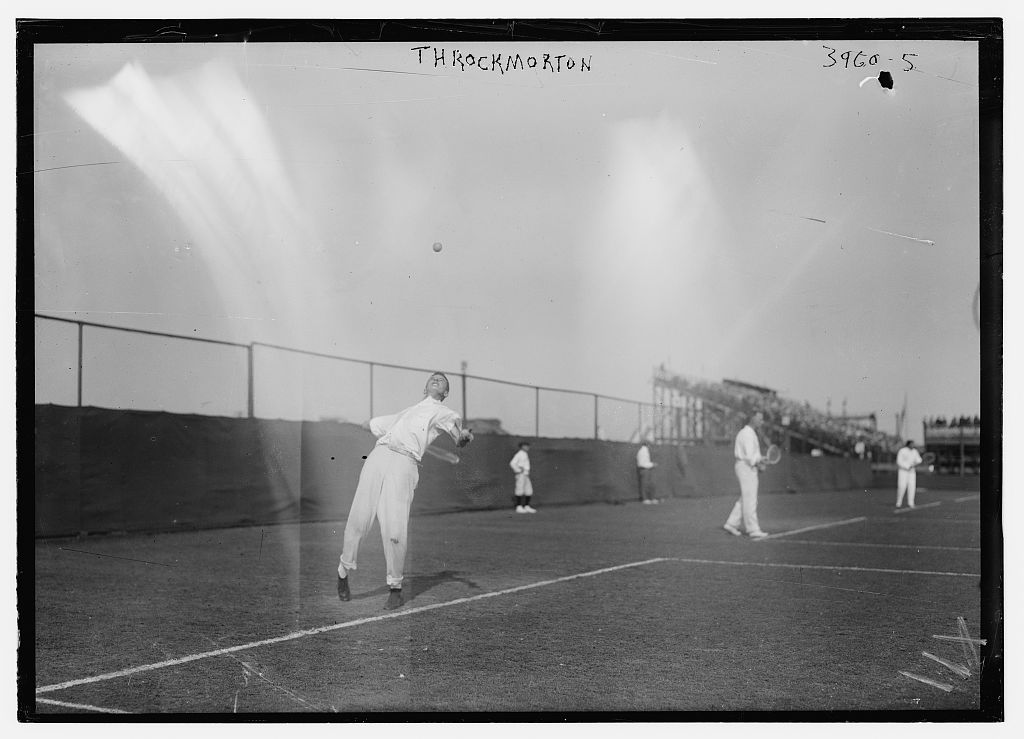
- Full name: Harold Avington Throckmorton
- Country (sports): United States
- Born: April 12, 1897; Hackensack, New Jersey
- Died: November 5, 1973 (aged 76); Great Barrington, Massachusetts
- Plays: Right–handed (one-handed backhand)

Singles

Grand Slam singles results
- US Open: QF (1917)

Doubles

Grand Slam doubles results
- US Open: W (1917)

Harold Avington Throckmorton (April 12, 1897 – November 5, 1973) was an American tennis player in the early 20th century.

== Biography ==
He was born on April 12, 1897, in Hackensack, New Jersey.

He played intercollegiate tennis for Princeton University. He was champion of the state of New Jersey. In 1917 he won the men's doubles titles at the U.S. National Championships with Fred Alexander.

In 1918, he served in the artillery in the United States Army. After the war, he became a businessman. He died in 1973. He left $2,500 (equivalent to $18,000 in 2024) for the care of his Irish terrier.

== Grand Slam finals ==
=== Doubles (1 title) ===
Result	Year	Championship	Surface	Partner	Opponents	Score
Win	1917	US Championships	Grass	(United States) Fred Alexander	(United States) Harry Johnson (United States) Irving Wright	11–9, 6–4, 6–4
