= Chuck Garland =

American tennis player

Charles "Chuck" Garland
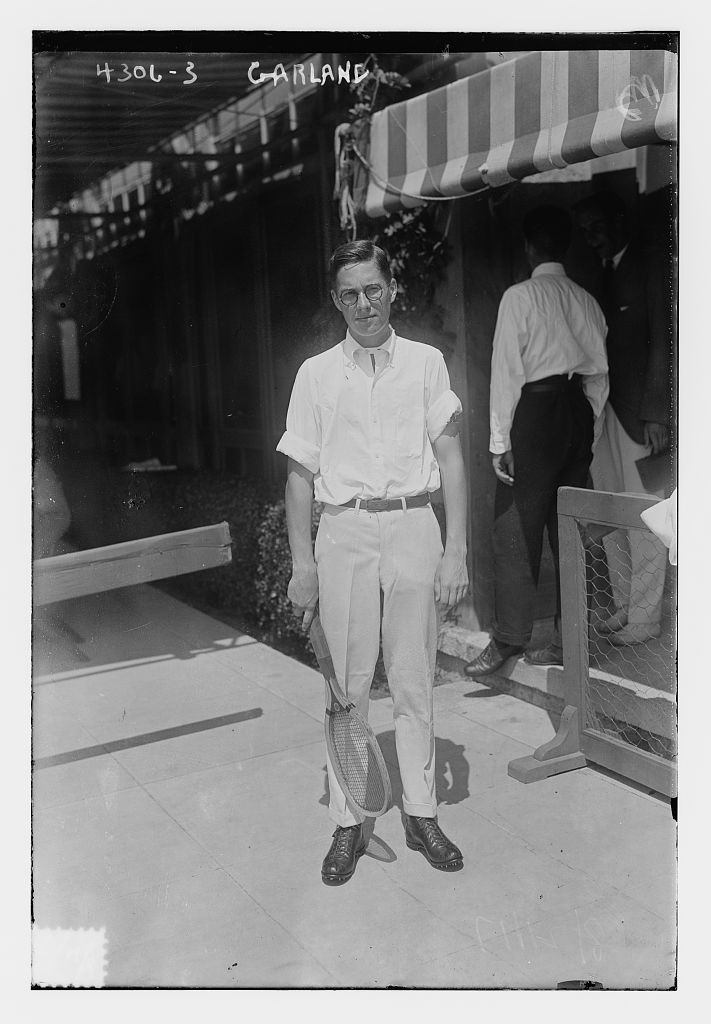
- Garland at the 1917 U.S. National Championships
- Full name: Charles Stedman Garland
- Country (sports): United States
- Born: October 29, 1898 Pittsburgh, USA
- Died: January 28, 1971 (aged 72) Baltimore, USA
- Plays: Right-handed (one-handed backhand)
- Int. Tennis HoF: 1969 (member page)

Singles
- Highest ranking: No. 8 (U.S. ranking)

Grand Slam singles results
- Wimbledon: SF (1919, 1920)
- US Open: QF (1917)

Doubles

Grand Slam doubles results
- Wimbledon: W (1920)

Mixed doubles

Grand Slam mixed doubles results
- Wimbledon: 2R (1920)

Charles Stedman Garland (October 29, 1898 – January 28, 1971) was an American tennis player who won the 1920 Wimbledon men's doubles title with Richard Norris Williams. He reached the singles semi finals at Wimbledon in 1919 (losing to Algernon Kingscote) and 1920 (losing to Bill Tilden). His highest U.S. singles ranking was No. 8. He was inducted into the International Tennis Hall of Fame in 1969.

Garland won the US Intercollegiate Championships for Yale in 1919 and served as Vice President of the USLTA. He was born in Pittsburgh.

== Grand Slam finals ==
=== Doubles (1 title) ===
Result	Year	Championship	Surface	Partner	Opponents	Score
Win	1920	Wimbledon	Grass	(United States) Richard Norris Williams	(United Kingdom of Great Britain and Ireland) Algernon Kingscote (United Kingdom of Great Britain and Ireland) James Parke	4–6, 6–4, 7–5, 6–2
