= Philip B. Hawk =

American biochemist, nutritionist and writer (1874-1966)

Philip Bovier Hawk
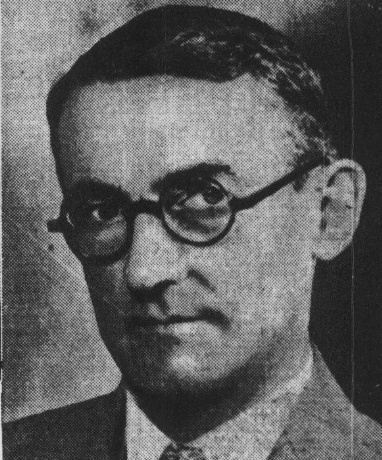
- Born: July 18, 1874; East Branch, New York
- Died: September 13, 1966 (aged 92)
- Occupation(s): Biochemist, nutritionist

Philip Bovier Hawk (July 18, 1874 - September 13, 1966) was an American biochemist, nutritionist, and amateur tennis player.

== Biography ==
Hawk was born in East Branch, New York. He studied at Wesleyan University, where he obtained his B.S. degree in 1898. He worked as an assistant to Wilbur Olin Atwater in nutrition research at Wesleyan University (1898–1900).

Hawk studied physiological chemistry at Sheffield Scientific School and obtained his M.S. in 1902 and Ph.D. from Columbia University College of Physicians and Surgeons in 1903. He taught at physiological chemistry the University of Illinois and toxicology at Philadelphia's Jefferson Medical College. Hawk was assistant professor of physiological chemistry at University of Pennsylvania (1903-1907).

He was the author of the influential book Practical Physiological Chemistry published in 1907 that went through many editions. It contained biochemical methods and preparations that were used as laboratory exercises by medical students for more than half a century. Its thirteenth, "Golden Anniversary Edition" was published in 1954.

An expert in nutrition, he founded the Food and Drug Research Laboratories in 1922. His research was successful and the laboratory moved to New York City and was incorporated in 1926 as the Food Research Laboratories. His book Streamline for Health is a debunking of fad diets of his day, such as the Hay diet. Hawk was a member of the American Association for the Advancement of Science, American Medical Association, American Chemical Society, the American Philosophical Society, and the American Physiological Society.

== Tennis ==
Hawk was an experienced tennis player. He was a singles semifinalist at the Cincinnati Open in 1908 and won singles titles at the state championships of Delaware (1905), and Connecticut (1907, 1908 and 1909). He was the National Veterans' champion from 1921 to 1923. He was president of the West Side Tennis Club. Hawk married his second wife Gladys Taylor Lynch in 1923.

== Selected publications ==
- Practical Physiological Chemistry (1907)
- The Activity of the Pancreatic Function Under the Influence of Copious and Moderate Water-Drinking with Meals (1911)
- What We Eat and What Happens to It (1919)
- The Lottery of Love (1925)
- Streamline for Health (1935)
- Off the Racket: Tennis Highlights and Lowdowns (1937, with an introduction by Stephen Wallis Merrihew)
