= Robert Lindley Murray =

American tennis player and chemist

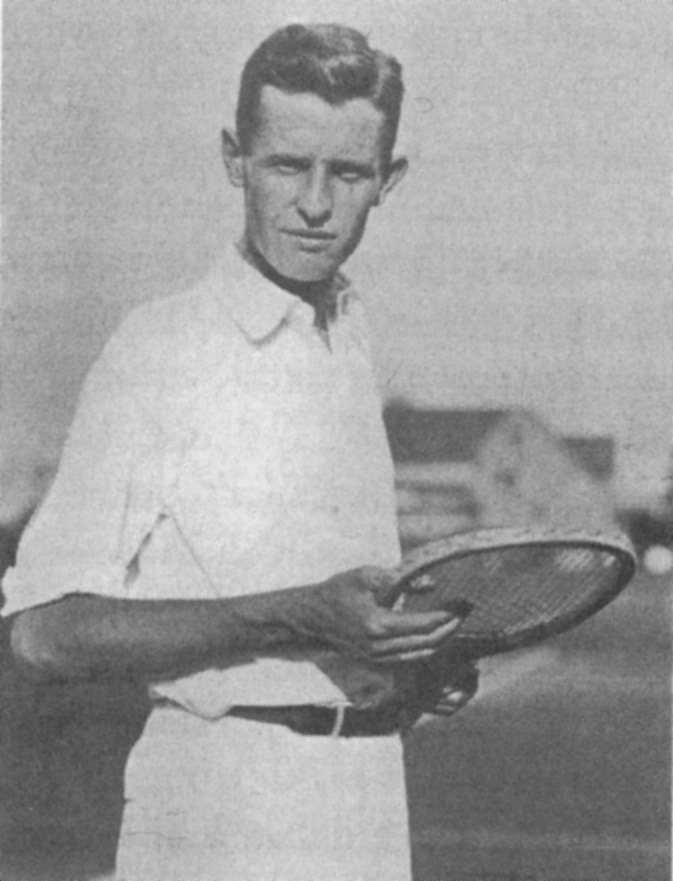
- Country (sports): United States
- Born: November 2, 1892 San Francisco, California
- Died: January 17, 1970 (aged 77) Lewiston, New York
- Height: 1.88 m (6 ft 2 in)
- Turned pro: 1913 (amateur tour)
- Retired: 1926 (played part-time afterwards)
- Plays: Left-handed (1-handed backhand)
- Int. Tennis HoF: 1958 (member page)

Singles
- Career record: 131-24 (84.5%)
- Career titles: 16

Grand Slam singles results
- US Open: W (1917, 1918)

Other tournaments
- Professional majors
- US Pro: SF (1933)

Robert Lindley Murray (November 2, 1892 – January 17, 1970) was an American chemist and tennis player.

== Early life ==
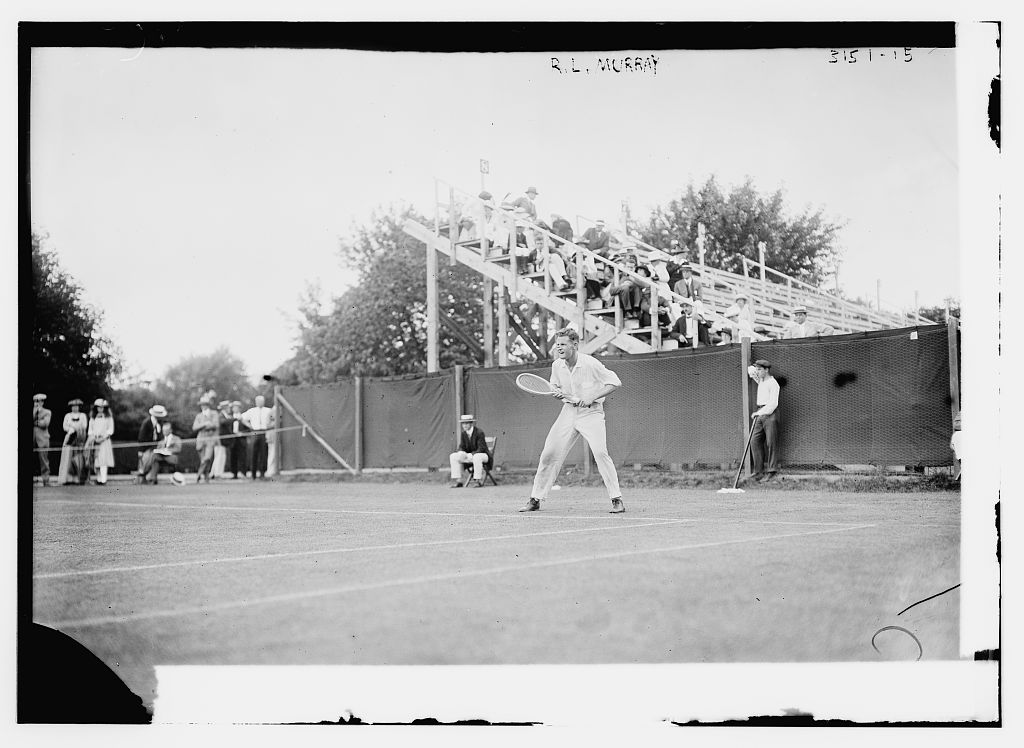
Robert Lindley Murray

Robert Lindley Murray was born in San Francisco, California to Augustus Taber Murray and Nellie Howland Gifford. He graduated from Stanford University in 1913 with a degree in chemistry and received a chemical engineering master's degree the following year. Murray played for the varsity team and became the 1913 Pacific Coast intercollegiate champion.

== Career ==
In 1961, Murray retired as the chairman of the Hooker Chemical Company.

== Tennis ==
In June 1914, Murray won the New York Metropolitan title defeating Fred Alexander in the final in five sets, and in August, he won the Meadow Club Cup at Southampton, New York, beating Watson Washburn in the final in three straight sets.

Murray won his first national tennis title in February 1916 when he became the singles champion at the U.S. National Indoor Tennis Championships, played at the Seventh Regiment Armory in New York. In the final, he defeated Alrick Man in three sets 6–2, 6–2, 9–7.

He won the U.S. National Championship men's singles title in 1917 and 1918. The tournaments were renamed National Patriotic Tournaments in support of the war effort. No trophies were handed out to the winners, and the entrance fees were dedicated to the Red Cross. In 1917, Murray defeated Bostonian Nathaniel W. Niles in four sets. Murray did not intend to play the 1918 National Patriotic Tournament as his skills as chemical engineer were considered too important for him to play during wartime. Only after a lengthy effort to persuade him by Elon Hooker, the president of his company, did Murray consent to play. Despite little preparation, he managed to reach the final in which he faced Bill Tilden, the future seven-time champion. In an impressive performance, Murray easily defeated Tilden in three sets 6–3, 6–1, 7–5.

In the USLTA national rankings, he was the U.S. No. 1 in 1918, and was ranked fourth in 1914, 1916 and 1919.

== Grand Slam finals ==
=== Singles (2 titles) ===
Result	Year	Championship	Surface	Opponent	Score
Win	1917	U.S. Championships	Grass	(United States) Nathaniel W. Niles	5–7, 8–6, 6–3, 6–3
Win	1918	U.S. Championships	Grass	(United States) Bill Tilden	6–3, 6–1, 7–5

== Personal life ==
Murray died on January 17, 1970, in Lewiston Heights, New York.
