= Florence Ballin =

American tennis player

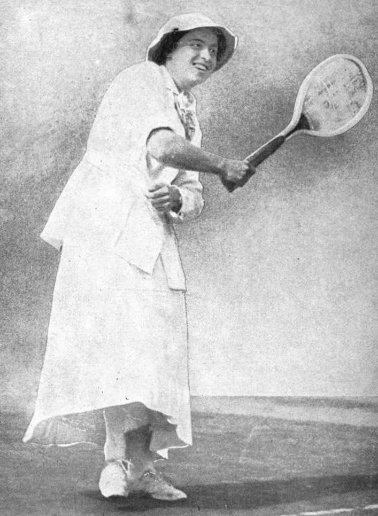
- Full name: Florence Antoinette Ballin
- Country (sports): United States
- Born: April 27, 1887 New York City, United States
- Died: April 1, 1975 (aged 87)

Grand Slam mixed doubles results
- US Open: F (1916, 1917, 1919)

Florence A. Ballin (1887-1975) was a tennis player from the U.S. She played in the mixed doubles in the early 1900s. She made it to three US Open finals with Bill Tilden.

== Career ==
In 1915 Ballin reached the doubles final at the US Indoor Championships, playing with Molla Bjursted.

Ballin reached the final of the mixed doubles competition at the U.S. National Championships on three occasions (1916, 1917, 1919). Each time she partnered with multiple champion Bill Tilden but they lost all three finals.

In 1919, she wrote a tennis book titled Tennis for Girls.

In 1920, she won the women's New Jersey Championships and Long Island Championships. She won the women's lawn tennis championship of Pennsylvania and Eastern States in 1922 defeating Anne Townsend in straight sets.

== Grand Slam finals ==
=== Mixed doubles (3 runners-up) ===
Result	Year	Championship	Surface	Partner	Opponents	Score
Loss	1916	U.S. Championships	Grass	(United States) Bill Tilden	(United States) Eleonora Sears (United States) Willis E. Davis	4–6, 5–7
Loss	1917	U.S. Championships	Grass	(United States) Bill Tilden	(Norway) Molla Bjurstedt (United States) Irving Wright	12–10, 1–6, 3–6
Loss	1919	U.S. Championships	Grass	(United States) Bill Tilden	(United States) Marion Zinderstein (United States) Vincent Richards	6–2, 9–11, 2–6
