= Irving Wright =

American tennis player

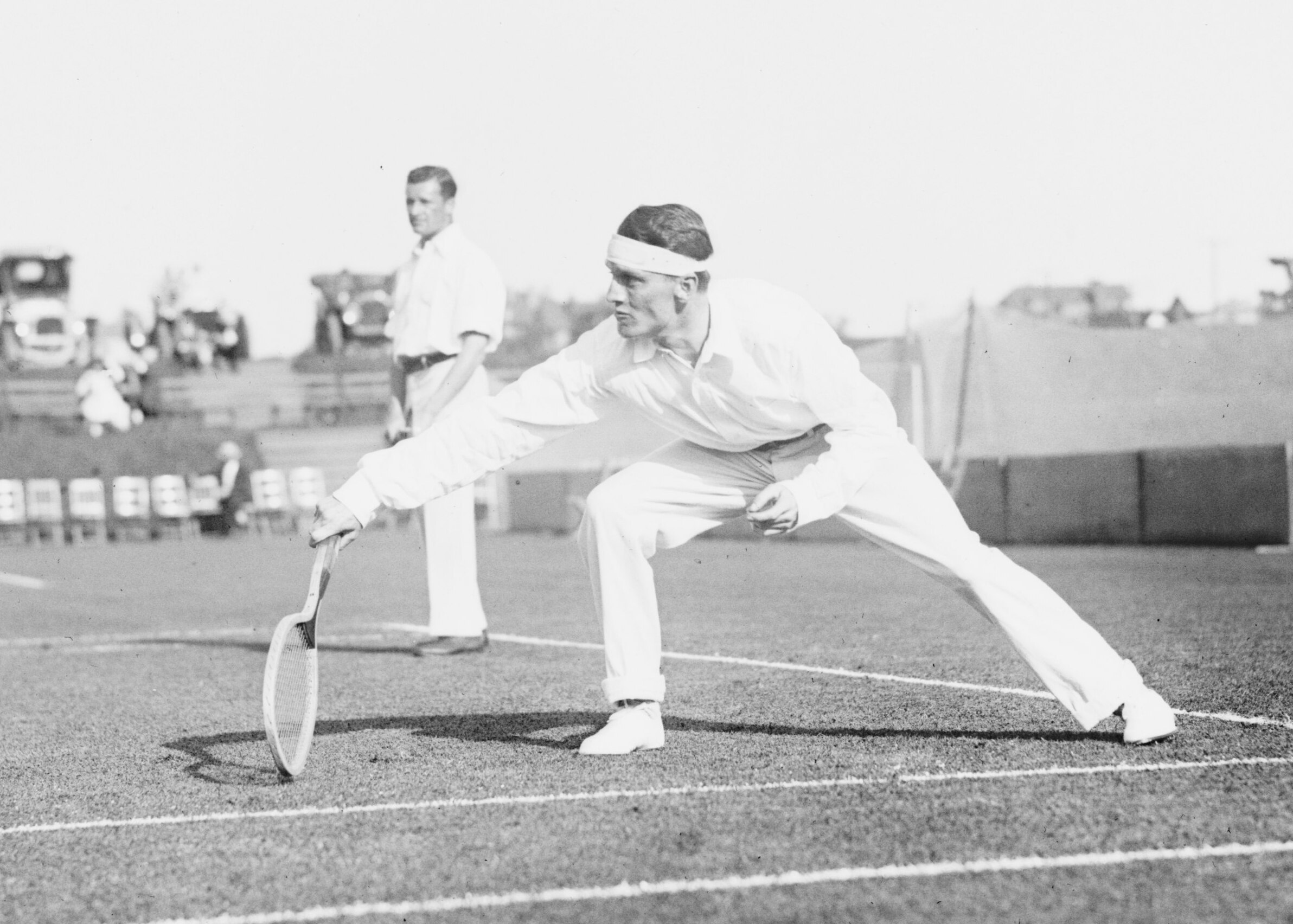
- Full name: Irving Christian Wright
- Country (sports): USA
- Born: May 13, 1882 Boston, Massachusetts, United States
- Died: 23 June 1953 (aged 71) Boston, Massachusetts, United States
- Plays: Right-handed (one-handed backhand)

Singles

Grand Slam singles results
- US Open: QF (1915, 1920)

Doubles

Grand Slam doubles results
- US Open: F (1917)

Mixed doubles

Grand Slam mixed doubles results
- US Open: W (1917, 1918)

Irving Christian Wright (1882–1953) was an American male tennis player who was active in the early 20th century.

== Career ==
In 1907 Irving won the Long Island Lawn Tennis Championship. In 1917 he won the U.S. National Championship mixed doubles championship with Norwegian Molla Bjurstedt by defeating Bill Tilden and Florence Ballin in three sets. The next year he successfully defended the title, this time partnering Hazel Hotchkiss Wightman, winning against Molla Bjurstedt and Fred Alexander in straight sets.

In 1917 he also reached the final of the U.S. National Championship men's doubles competition with Harry Johnson but lost in straight sets to Fred Alexander and Harold Throckmorton.

Irving was the son of George Wright, an American baseball pioneer and one of the founders of the Wright & Ditson sporting goods firm and the brother of U.S. Championship winner and Olympic gold medalist Beals Wright. Together they won the men's doubles title at the Canadian Tennis Championship four times (1902, 1903, 1904, 1905). Irving Wright was president of Longwood Cricket Club and vice president of A. G. Spalding.

== Grand Slam finals ==
=== Doubles (1 runner-up) ===
Result	Year	Championship	Surface	Partner	Opponents	Score
Loss	1917	U.S. Championships	Grass	(United States) Harry Johnson	(United States) Fred Alexander (United States) Harold Throckmorton	9–11, 4–6, 4–6

=== Mixed doubles (2 titles) ===
Result	Year	Championship	Surface	Partner	Opponents	Score
Win	1917	U.S. Championships	Grass	(Norway) Molla Bjurstedt	(United States) Florence Ballin (United States) Bill Tilden	10–12, 6–1, 6–3
Win	1918	U.S. Championships	Grass	(United States) Hazel Hotchkiss Wightman	(Norway) Molla Bjurstedt (United States) Fred Alexander	6–2, 6–4
